= British Academy Games Award for Multiplayer =

Video game award

British Academy Video Games Award for Multiplayer
- Awarded for: The best multiplayer game experience, including social, online or offline
- Country: United Kingdom
- Presented by: BAFTA
- First award: 2004
- Currently held by: ARC Raiders
- Website: www.bafta.org/games

The British Academy Video Games Award for Multiplayer is an award presented annually by the British Academy of Film and Television Arts (BAFTA). It is given in honor of "the best multiplayer game experience, including social, online or offline". The award was formerly known as the British Academy Video Games Award for Online Multiplayer at the 2005, 2012 and 2013 ceremonies.

The award was first presented at the 1st British Academy Video Games Awards ceremony in 2004, with the EA Digital Illusions CE and Electronic Arts game Battlefield 1942 winning. Since its inception, the award has been given to eighteen games. Among developers, Valve has received the most awards, with three wins from four nominations, while Electronic Arts leads the publishers, with five wins from their sixteen nominations. Bungie holds the record for the developer with the most nominations without a win, with five Activision is the publisher with the most nominations without a win, with thirteen.

The current holder of the award is ARC Raiders by Embark Studios, which won at the 22nd British Academy Games Awards in 2026.

== Winners and nominees ==
In the following table, the years are listed as per BAFTA convention, and generally correspond to the year of game release in the United Kingdom.

Table key
Indicates the winner

Year	Game	Developer(s)	Publisher(s)	Ref.
2002/03 (1st)	Battlefield 1942	EA Digital Illusions CE	Electronic Arts	
2002/03 (1st)	EyeToy: Play	London Studio	Sony Computer Entertainment	
2002/03 (1st)	MotoGP 2	Climax Brighton	THQ	
2002/03 (1st)	Neverwinter Nights: Hordes of the Underdark	BioWare	Atari	
2002/03 (1st)	Project Gotham Racing 2	Bizarre Creations	Microsoft Game Studios	
2002/03 (1st)	Wolfenstein: Enemy Territory	Splash Damage	Activision	
2003/04 (2nd)	Half-Life 2	Valve	Valve, Sierra Entertainment	
2003/04 (2nd)	Burnout 3: Takedown	Criterion Games	Electronic Arts	
2003/04 (2nd)	Far Cry	Crytek	Ubisoft	
2003/04 (2nd)	Halo 2	Bungie	Microsoft Game Studios	
2003/04 (2nd)	Ratchet & Clank: Up Your Arsenal	Insomniac Games	Sony Computer Entertainment	
2003/04 (2nd)	Tom Clancy's Splinter Cell: Pandora Tomorrow	Ubisoft Shanghai, Ubisoft Annecy	Ubisoft	
2005/06 (3rd)	Dungeons & Dragons Online: Stormreach	Turbine, Inc.	Atari, Warner Bros. Interactive Entertainment	
2005/06 (3rd)	2006 FIFA World Cup	EA Canada, Exient Entertainment	Electronic Arts	
2005/06 (3rd)	Animal Crossing: Wild World	Nintendo EAD	Nintendo	
2005/06 (3rd)	Battlefield 2: Modern Combat	EA Digital Illusions CE	Electronic Arts	
2005/06 (3rd)	Guild Wars Factions	ArenaNet	NCSOFT	
2005/06 (3rd)	Tom Clancy's Ghost Recon Advanced Warfighter	Ubisoft Shanghai, Red Storm Entertainment, Ubisoft Barcelona, Ubisoft Paris, Tiwak, Grin	Ubisoft	
2006/07 (4th)	Wii Sports	Nintendo EAD	Nintendo	
2006/07 (4th)	Battlefield 2142	EA Digital Illusions CE	Electronic Arts	
2006/07 (4th)	Crackdown	Realtime Worlds	Microsoft Game Studios	
2006/07 (4th)	Guitar Hero II	Harmonix	Activision	
2006/07 (4th)	World in Conflict	Massive Entertainment	Sierra Entertainment	
2006/07 (4th)	World of Warcraft: The Burning Crusade	Blizzard Entertainment		
2007/08 (5th)	Left 4 Dead	Valve	Valve	
2007/08 (5th)	Buzz!: Quiz TV	Relentless Software	Sony Computer Entertainment	
2007/08 (5th)	Call of Duty 4: Modern Warfare	Infinity Ward	Activision	
2007/08 (5th)	Gears of War 2	Epic Games	Microsoft Game Studios	
2007/08 (5th)	Mario Kart Wii	Nintendo EAD	Nintendo	
2007/08 (5th)	Rock Band	Harmonix	MTV Games	
2009 (6th)	Left 4 Dead 2	Valve	Valve	
2009 (6th)	Battlefield 1943	EA Digital Illusions CE	Electronic Arts	
2009 (6th)	The Beatles: Rock Band	Harmonix	MTV Games	
2009 (6th)	Call of Duty: Modern Warfare 2	Infinity Ward	Activision	
2009 (6th)	Halo 3: ODST	Bungie	Microsoft Game Studios	
2009 (6th)	Uncharted 2: Among Thieves	Naughty Dog	Sony Computer Entertainment	
2010 (7th)	Need for Speed: Hot Pursuit	Criterion Games	Electronic Arts	
2010 (7th)	Assassin's Creed: Brotherhood	Ubisoft Montreal	Ubisoft	
2010 (7th)	Battlefield: Bad Company 2	EA Digital Illusions CE	Electronic Arts	
2010 (7th)	Call of Duty: Black Ops	Treyarch	Activision	
2010 (7th)	Halo: Reach	Bungie	Microsoft Studios	
2010 (7th)	StarCraft II: Wings of Liberty	Blizzard Entertainment		
2011 (8th)	Battlefield 3	EA Digital Illusions CE	Electronic Arts	
2011 (8th)	Assassin's Creed: Revelations	Ubisoft Montreal	Ubisoft	
2011 (8th)	Call of Duty: Modern Warfare 3	Infinity Ward, Sledgehammer Games	Activision	
2011 (8th)	Dark Souls	FromSoftware	Namco Bandai Games	
2011 (8th)	Gears of War 3	Epic Games	Microsoft Studios	
2011 (8th)	LittleBigPlanet 2	Media Molecule	Sony Computer Entertainment	
2012 (9th)	Journey	Thatgamecompany	Sony Computer Entertainment	
2012 (9th)	Assassin's Creed III	Ubisoft Montreal	Ubisoft	
2012 (9th)	Borderlands 2	Gearbox Software	2K Games	
2012 (9th)	Call of Duty: Black Ops II	Treyarch	Activision	
2012 (9th)	Halo 4	343 Industries	Microsoft Studios	
2012 (9th)	Need for Speed: Most Wanted	Criterion Games	Electronic Arts	
2013 (10th)	Grand Theft Auto V	Rockstar North	Rockstar Games	
2013 (10th)	Battlefield 4	EA Digital Illusions CE	Electronic Arts	
2013 (10th)	Dota 2	Valve	Valve	
2013 (10th)	The Last of Us	Naughty Dog	Sony Computer Entertainment	
2013 (10th)	Super Mario 3D World	Nintendo EAD Tokyo, 1-Up Studio	Nintendo	
2013 (10th)	World of Tanks	Wargaming		
2014 (11th)	Hearthstone: Heroes of Warcraft	Blizzard Entertainment		
2014 (11th)	Call of Duty: Advanced Warfare	Sledgehammer Games	Activision	
2014 (11th)	Destiny	Bungie	Activision	
2014 (11th)	Mario Kart 8	Nintendo EAD	Nintendo	
2014 (11th)	Minecraft: Console Editions	Mojang	Mojang, Microsoft Studios	
2014 (11th)	Titanfall	Respawn Entertainment	Electronic Arts	
2015 (12th)	Rocket League	Psyonix	Psyonix	
2015 (12th)	Destiny: The Taken King	Bungie	Activision	
2015 (12th)	Lovers in a Dangerous Spacetime	Asteroid Base		
2015 (12th)	Splatoon	Nintendo EAD	Nintendo	
2015 (12th)	Tom Clancy's Rainbow Six Siege	Ubisoft Montreal	Ubisoft	
2015 (12th)	World of Warships	Lesta Studio, Wargaming	Wargaming	
2016 (13th)	Overwatch	Blizzard Entertainment	Blizzard Entertainment	
2016 (13th)	Battlefield 1	EA DICE	Electronic Arts	
2016 (13th)	Forza Horizon 3	Playground Games	Microsoft Studios	
2016 (13th)	Overcooked	Ghost Town Games	Team17	
2016 (13th)	Titanfall 2	Respawn Entertainment	Electronic Arts	
2016 (13th)	Tom Clancy's The Division	Massive Entertainment	Ubisoft	
2017 (14th)	Divinity: Original Sin II	Larian Studios	Larian Studios	
2017 (14th)	Fortnite	Epic Games		
2017 (14th)	Gang Beasts	Boneloaf	Double Fine Productions	
2017 (14th)	PlayerUnknown's Battlegrounds	PUBG Corporation	Bluehole Inc.	
2017 (14th)	Splatoon 2	Nintendo EPD	Nintendo	
2017 (14th)	Star Trek: Bridge Crew	Red Storm Entertainment	Ubisoft	
2018 (15th)	A Way Out	Hazelight	EA Originals	
2018 (15th)	Battlefield V	EA DICE	Electronic Arts	
2018 (15th)	Overcooked 2	Ghost Town Games & Team17	Team17	
2018 (15th)	Sea of Thieves	Rare	Microsoft Studios	
2018 (15th)	Super Mario Party	NDcube	Nintendo	
2018 (15th)	Super Smash Bros. Ultimate	Nintendo, Bandai Namco & Sora Ltd.	Nintendo	
2019 (16th)	Apex Legends	Respawn Entertainment	Electronic Arts	
2019 (16th)	Borderlands 3	Gearbox Software	2K Games	
2019 (16th)	Call of Duty: Modern Warfare	Infinity Ward	Activision	
2019 (16th)	Luigi's Mansion 3	Next Level Games	Nintendo	
2019 (16th)	Tick Tock: A Tale for Two	Other Tales Interactive		
2019 (16th)	Tom Clancy's The Division 2	Massive Entertainment	Ubisoft	
2020 (17th)	Animal Crossing: New Horizons	Nintendo EPD	Nintendo	
2020 (17th)	Deep Rock Galactic	Ghost Ship Games	Coffee Stain Publishing	
2020 (17th)	Fall Guys	Mediatonic	Devolver Digital	
2020 (17th)	Ghost of Tsushima	Sucker Punch Productions	Sony Interactive Entertainment	
2020 (17th)	Sackboy: A Big Adventure	Sumo Digital	Sony Interactive Entertainment	
2020 (17th)	Valorant	Riot Games		
2021 (18th)	It Takes Two	Hazelight Studios	Electronic Arts	
2021 (18th)	Back 4 Blood	Turtle Rock Studios	Warner Bros. Interactive Entertainment	
2021 (18th)	Call of Duty: Vanguard	Sledgehammer Games	Activision	
2021 (18th)	Forza Horizon 5	Playground Games	Xbox Game Studios	
2021 (18th)	Halo Infinite	343 Industries	Xbox Game Studios	
2021 (18th)	Hell Let Loose	Black Matter	Team17	
2022 (19th)	Elden Ring	FromSoftware	Bandai Namco	
2022 (19th)	Call of Duty: Modern Warfare II	Infinity Ward	Activision	
2022 (19th)	FIFA 23	EA Sports		
2022 (19th)	Overwatch 2	Blizzard Entertainment		
2022 (19th)	Splatoon 3	Nintendo		
2022 (19th)	Teenage Mutant Ninja Turtles: Shredder's Revenge	Tribute Games	Dotemu	
2023 (20th)	Super Mario Bros. Wonder	Nintendo EPD	Nintendo	
2023 (20th)	Baldur's Gate 3	Larian Studios		
2023 (20th)	Call of Duty: Modern Warfare III	Sledgehammer Games	Activision	
2023 (20th)	Diablo IV	Blizzard Entertainment		
2023 (20th)	Forza Motorsport	Turn 10 Studios	Xbox Game Studios	
2023 (20th)	Party Animals	Recreate Games	Source Technology	
2024 (21st)	Helldivers 2	Arrowhead	Sony Interactive Entertainment	
2024 (21st)	Call of Duty: Black Ops 6	Treyarch/Raven	Activision	
2024 (21st)	Lego Horizon Adventures	Guerrilla	Studio Gobo	
2024 (21st)	Super Mario Party Jamboree	Nintendo Cube		
2024 (21st)	Tekken 8	Bandai Namco	Arika	
2024 (21st)	Warhammer 40,000: Space Marine 2	Saber Interactive	Focus Entertainment	
2025 (22nd)	ARC Raiders	Embark Studios		
2025 (22nd)	Dune: Awakening	Funcom		
2025 (22nd)	Elden Ring Nightreign	FromSoftware	Bandai Namco Entertainment	
2025 (22nd)	Lego Party	SMG Studio	Fictions	
2025 (22nd)	Peak	Aggro Crab	Landfall Games	
2025 (22nd)	Split Fiction	Hazelight Studios	Electronic Arts	

== Multiple wins and nominations ==
=== Developers ===
The following developers received two or more Multiplayer awards:

Wins	Developer
3	Valve
2	Blizzard Entertainment
2	EA Digital Illusions CE
2	Hazelight Studios

The following developers received three or more Multiplayer nominations:

Nominations	Developer
10	Nintendo EAD/Nintendo
9	EA Digital Illusions CE
6	Blizzard Entertainment
5	Bungie
5	Infinity Ward
4	Ubisoft Montreal
4	Valve
3	Criterion Games
3	Harmonix
3	Massive Entertainment
3	Respawn Entertainment

=== Publishers ===
The following publishers received two or more Multiplayer awards:

Wins	Publisher
5	Electronic Arts
3	Nintendo
3	Valve
2	Blizzard Entertainment

The following publishers received three or more Multiplayer nominations:

Nominations	Publisher
16	Electronic Arts
15	Activision
15	Nintendo
11	Microsoft Studios
10	Ubisoft
10	Sony Computer Entertainment/Sony Interactive Entertainment
6	Blizzard Entertainment
4	Valve
