= Split Fiction =

- Developer: Hazelight Studios
- Publisher: Electronic Arts
- Director: Josef Fares
- Producers: Aimar Bergan; Daniel Issa
- Designer: Per Stenbeck
- Programmer: Jonas Mauritzsson
- Writers: Sebastian Antonios Johansson; Josef Fares
- Composers: Gustaf Grefberg; Jonatan Järpehag
- Engine: Unreal Engine 5
- Platforms: PlayStation 5; Windows; Xbox Series X/S; Nintendo Switch 2
- Release: PS5, Windows, Xbox Series X/S; March 6, 2025; Nintendo Switch 2; June 5, 2025
- Genres: Action-adventure, platform
- Mode: Multiplayer

Split Fiction is a 2025 action-adventure game developed by Hazelight Studios and published by Electronic Arts. As a cooperative multiplayer-only game, it follows authors Mio Hudson and Zoe Foster after they become imprisoned in the world of their stories when they are connected to a machine designed to steal creative ideas.

Split Fiction was released for PlayStation 5, Windows, and Xbox Series X/S on March 6, 2025, and was released on Nintendo Switch 2 on June 5. The game received critical acclaim and sold over seven million copies as of April 2026.

== Gameplay ==
In the game, two players must take on different roles and work together to succeed.

As with Hazelight's previous game, It Takes Two, Split Fiction was specifically designed for split screen cooperative multiplayer, which means that it must be played with another player through either local or online play. In the game, players assume control of either Zoe or Mio, two authors who both become trapped inside their own stories after being linked to a machine. The two strangers must work together to escape and overcome numerous challenges along the way, as Mio's science fiction story interweaves with Zoe's fantasy story, putting both characters in grave danger.

The game is an action-adventure video game played from a third-person perspective, requiring players to complete platforming challenges and occasionally combating against hostile enemies. Stages are often accompanied with a unique one-off gameplay mechanic. The ability for both characters within each stage is also different, meaning that the two must collaborate with each other and utilize the respective abilities of their playable characters in order to progress. There are also side stories in each area, which can be accessed by entering a portal. Side Stories are based on unfinished ideas and stories written by both Zoe and Mio when they were younger. As with the main level, each side story also features an accompanying gameplay mechanic.

== Plot ==
Mio Hudson (Kaja Chan) and Zoe Foster (Elsie Bennett) are writers invited by a company called Rader Publishing to test out an experimental simulation device along with four other writers. While the eccentric Zoe sees this as an opportunity to be published as a real author, the reserved Mio is only interested in the payout. CEO J.D. Rader (Ben Turner) introduces "The Machine", which allows occupants to experience the stories they submitted as reality. As the Machine starts up, each occupant is encased in a bubble and placed into suspended animation while they experience their story. Suspicious of the experiment and Rader's motives, Mio panics and tries to back out; however, Rader forces her to stay, and a scuffle leads her to inadvertently fall into Zoe's bubble.

Mio appears in Zoe's fantasy story, followed by a glitch which tears apart the environment. When they approach the glitch, they are both transported to Mio's science fiction story. The duo make their way through both of their intellectual creations and find the glitch to be expanding, since the Machine was never designed to handle two occupants in one bubble. The system is also unable to shut down due to the glitches. After some debating with his superiors (Joseph Capp, Christy Meyer, Rich Keeble), Rader decides not to shut down the experiment, as the ideas are too valuable to lose.

Overhearing Rader and his scientists (Nneka Okoye, Dario Coates), Mio realizes Rader is stealing all their ideas, not just the ones submitted, but also dormant and unfinished ideas from each of their memories as they are played out in the simulation. Zoe suggests finding more glitches may destabilize the system and set them free. After managing to establish communication between both groups, Rader then tries to bribe Mio, but she sees through his bluff. The duo travel through more fantasy and science fiction inspired worlds from each of their imaginations. At one point, Rader's scientists attempt to hinder the duo's efforts and repair the system, but are thwarted at the last second. This causes a frustrated Rader to rebel against his superiors.

As they travel through the stories, the duo begin to learn more about each other. Zoe is unable to accept and move past her sister Ella's death when she was young, which she blames herself for. Mio is unable to open up to others and shuts out all emotion to deal with her trauma while taking care of her ailing father. Their stories and thoughts reflect these themes. With the glitches threatening to destroy his Machine, Rader sets it to full power against the wishes of his superiors, which pushes Zoe and Mio into their subconscious. The scientists are against this, leading Rader to fire them.

In Mio's subconscious, the duo fight through a harsh wasteland before encountering "Dark Mio", a personification of Mio's repressed negative emotions. Zoe manages to defeat her after Mio forces herself to let go of her trauma. In Zoe's subconscious, the duo travel through dark childhood memories before encountering Ella. Mio encourages Zoe to embrace her sister, and she is finally able to move past her death.

Escaping their subconscious, the duo threaten to destroy the Machine. A desperate Rader forces himself into their bubble, appearing as an enormous, godlike figure. Zoe and Mio work together to defeat him and destroy the Machine, which sets them free. As the police come to arrest Rader for endangerment, the duo leave as friends. A year later, Mio and Zoe publish their first novel Split Fiction, based on their experience in the simulation.

== Development ==
Split Fiction was first announced by Hazelight Studios and its game director Josef Fares at The Game Awards 2024. Its development started following the release of It Takes Two in 2021. A team of 80 people built the game using Unreal Engine 5. The two characters are named after Fares' two daughters, and Fares compared the game's narrative to that of a "buddy movie" as the two characters start as complete strangers who must slowly bond with each other in order to survive. Fares wrote that one of the biggest challenges developing a game with diverse gameplay mechanics was to ensure that each mechanic was fully polished. While a gameplay sequence utilizing a certain gameplay mechanic may only last for several minutes, the team had to work on them for months to ensure its controls were sufficiently intuitive.

== Release ==
Split Fiction was released for PlayStation 5, Windows, and Xbox Series X/S on March 6, 2025 and was released on Nintendo Switch 2 on June 5, 2025. As with Hazelight's previous games, it utilizes a "Friend's Pass" system, in which owner of the game can invite a friend to play together for free. It also supports cross-platform play. As with Hazelight's previous games, Split Fiction is published under Electronic Arts' EA Originals label.

== Reception ==
Reception

Aggregate scores
Aggregator	Score
Metacritic	(PS5) 91/100 (Note: Based on 116 reviews) (PC) 90/100 (Note: Based on 34 reviews) (NS2) 89/100 (Note: Based on 18 reviews) (XSXS) 93/100 (Note: Based on 16 reviews)
OpenCritic	98% recommend

Review scores
Publication	Score
Destructoid	9.5/10
Digital Trends	3.5/5
Eurogamer	5/5
Famitsu	34/40
GameSpot	10/10
GamesRadar+	4.5/5
Hardcore Gamer	3.5/5
IGN	9/10
NME	5/5
PC Gamer (US)	87/100
PCGamesN	9/10
Push Square	10/10
Shacknews	9/10
Video Games Chronicle	4/5
VG247	5/5

Split Fiction received "universal acclaim" from critics, according to review aggregator website Metacritic. OpenCritic reported that 98% of critics recommended the game. In Japan, four critics from Famitsu gave the game a total score of 34 out of 40.

=== Sales ===
Split Fiction sold over 1 million units within 2 days after release, and surpassed 2 million units sold in a week since release. By May 6, 2025, Split Fiction had sold over 4 million copies worldwide. It was the 19th best-selling game of 2025 in the US. As of April 2026, Split Fiction has sold 7 million copies worldwide.

=== Accolades ===
Year	Award	Category	Result	Ref.
2025	Develop:Star Awards	Best Game	Nominated	
2025	Develop:Star Awards	Best Studio (Hazelight Studios)	Nominated	
2025	Golden Joystick Award	Ultimate Game of the Year	3rd place	
2025	Golden Joystick Award	Best Multiplayer Game	Nominated	
2025	The Game Awards 2025	Best Game Direction	Nominated	
2025	The Game Awards 2025	Best Action/Adventure Game	Nominated	
2025	The Game Awards 2025	Best Family Game	Nominated	
2025	The Game Awards 2025	Best Multiplayer Game	Nominated	
2026	The Steam Awards 2025	Better With Friends	Nominated	
2026	Ultra Game Awards 2025	Best Multiplayer to Enjoy Together	Won	
2026	15th New York Game Awards	Big Apple Award for Best Game of the Year	Nominated	
2026	15th New York Game Awards	Statue of Liberty Award for Best World	Nominated	
2026	29th Annual D.I.C.E. Awards	Online Game of the Year	Nominated	
2026	29th Annual D.I.C.E. Awards	Outstanding Achievement in Audio Design	Nominated	
2026	24th Game Audio Network Guild Awards	Best Game Foley	Nominated	
2026	24th Game Audio Network Guild Awards	Best New Original IP Audio	Nominated	
2026	24th Game Audio Network Guild Awards	Creative and Technical Achievement in Music	Nominated	
2026	24th Game Audio Network Guild Awards	Creative and Technical Achievement in Sound Design	Nominated	
2026	24th Game Audio Network Guild Awards	Dialogue of the Year	Nominated	
2026	24th Game Audio Network Guild Awards	Sound Design of the Year	Nominated	
2026	26th Game Developers Choice Awards	Best Design	Nominated	
2026	26th Game Developers Choice Awards	Best Narrative	Nominated	
2026	26th Game Developers Choice Awards	Best Technology	Nominated	
2026	26th Game Developers Choice Awards	Game of the Year	Nominated	
2026	22nd British Academy Games Awards	Best Game	Longlisted	
2026	22nd British Academy Games Awards	Audio Achievement	Longlisted	
2026	22nd British Academy Games Awards	Game Design	Nominated	
2026	22nd British Academy Games Awards	Multiplayer	Nominated	
2026	22nd British Academy Games Awards	Narrative	Longlisted	
2026	22nd British Academy Games Awards	New Intellectual Property	Nominated	
2026	22nd British Academy Games Awards	Performer in a Leading Role (Kaja Chan as Mio)	Longlisted	
2026	22nd British Academy Games Awards	Technical Achievement	Nominated	

== Film adaptation ==
Just two weeks after its release, it was announced that a film adaptation was in development, with Story Kitchen putting together the film's cast, writers and director. A bidding war took place for rights to the adaptation, with Amazon MGM Studios emerging as the winner.

Jon M. Chu was announced as the director, with a screenplay by Rhett Reese and Paul Wernick. Sydney Sweeney will star in the film in an undisclosed role and executive produce. The production is being handled by Dmitri M. Johnson and Michael Lawrence Goldberg of Story Kitchen in collaboration with Michael Bostick and Jon M. Chu of Electric Somewhere.
