= The Game Awards 2017 =

Video games award show

- Date: December 7, 2017
- Venue: Microsoft Theater, Los Angeles, United States
- Country: United States
- Hosted by: Geoff Keighley

Highlights
- Most awards: Cuphead; Hellblade: Senua's Sacrifice; The Legend of Zelda: Breath of the Wild (3)
- Most nominations: Destiny 2; Horizon Zero Dawn; The Legend of Zelda: Breath of the Wild; Super Mario Odyssey (6)
- Game of the Year: The Legend of Zelda: Breath of the Wild
- Industry Icon Award: Carol Shaw
- Website: thegameawards.com
- Viewership: 11.5 million

The Game Awards 2017 was an award show that honored the best video games of 2017, and took place at the Microsoft Theater in Los Angeles on December 7, 2017. The event was hosted by Geoff Keighley, and was live streamed around the world across various platforms, with 11.5 million viewers in total watching the event. The Legend of Zelda: Breath of the Wild won three awards, including Game of the Year. Two indie games, Cuphead and Hellblade: Senua's Sacrifice, also won three awards each.

== Presentation ==
The presentation was held at the Microsoft Theater in Los Angeles on December 7, 2017, hosted by Geoff Keighley, and live streamed across sixteen different content platforms worldwide. An integrated public voting system was included on Google Search and Twitter; and on Twitch, the show had an interactive overlay that allowed viewers to predict award winners before they are announced, the first such use of one on the platform. Certain streaming platforms also incentivized viewers to watch the Awards presentation through their specific service by entering those viewers into raffles for free games.

A month before the show, Facebook began presenting a five-part making-of documentary series on it via its Watch video service, known as "The Road to The Game Awards". During the event, sales on some of the nominated games were held across numerous game distribution platforms, such as the PlayStation Network and Steam. Alongside a mini-documentary shown at the show, a special Industry Icon award was given to Carol Shaw, who was one of the first female video game designers in the industry.

== Broadcast and viewership ==
The show included musical performances from French indie pop band Phoenix and The Game Awards Orchestra, a mixed group consisting of an orchestra and other guest musicians, such as Avenged Sevenfold guitarist Synyster Gates and cellist Tina Guo, who performed music from a number of the nominated games. The show also had numerous guests as award presenters or commentators, such as Metal Gear series creator Hideo Kojima, Mortal Kombat series creator Ed Boon, Nintendo of America president Reggie Fils-Aimé, film director Guillermo del Toro, television producers Justin Roiland and Conan O'Brien, and actors Norman Reedus, Andy Serkis, Felicia Day, Aisha Tyler, and Zachary Levi.

One highlight of the ceremony, noted by several outlets, was a rant given by game director Josef Fares while being interviewed on stage by Keighley to discuss his game, A Way Out. Fares, who had a prior history in the film industry before starting video game development, started his rant by saying "Fuck the Oscars", before speaking about how the Game Awards ceremony helped to highlight the developers and personalities that were passionate about their work. He also spoke a bit to the then-recent situation around loot boxes and microtransactions related to Electronic Arts' game Star Wars Battlefront II; as Electronic Arts is also the publisher for A Way Out, Fares stated that while "It's nice to hate EA", that "All publishers fuck up sometimes, you know?", while expressing his appreciate for their support for his game. Fares said in a later interview that he was "caught up in the moment", but still believed in the general points he had been trying to make; specifically, Fares indicated that video games as a medium was still seen in its infancy by most other media sources and that the Game Awards was treating the industry with the proper respect.

=== Viewership ===
Keighley reported that around 11.5 million viewers watched the show, tripling the 3.8 million viewers from The Game Awards 2016. Keighley believed part of this was their approach to gamify the show with the interactive winner predictions on their Twitch and Steam broadcasts, which also helped to increase the average length of time viewers watched, from about 25 minutes the previous year to 70 minutes in 2017. Keighley also attributes the higher viewership due to the quality of games that were released in 2017 and nominated, and the anticipation for yet-seen game trailers and new game announcements, though he wants to avoid future shows from being more like E3.

=== Game announcements ===
In addition to trailers and presentations for upcoming games and content for current ones, a short teaser for a game by FromSoftware was also shown, later revealed to be Sekiro: Shadows Die Twice. The show also included trailers from two films, Jumanji: Welcome to the Jungle and The Shape of Water. The list of games that were featured included:

- Accounting+
- Bayonetta and Bayonetta 2 Nintendo Switch ports
- Bayonetta 3
- Death Stranding
- Dreams
- Fade to Silence
- Fortnite
- GTFO
- In the Valley of Gods
- The Legend of Zelda: Breath of the Wild downloadable content (DLC)
- Metro Exodus
- PlayerUnknown's Battlegrounds
- Sea of Thieves
- Soulcalibur VI
- Vacation Simulator
- A Way Out
- Witchfire
- World War Z

== Awards ==
The nominees were announced on November 14, 2017. In order to be eligible, candidate games must have had either a commercial or early access release date on or before November 27, 2017. The list of nominees were selected by a panel of 51 people in the video game industry, with the top five games (or six in the case of ties) selected in each category presented as nominees. Public voting for awards ran from November 14 until December 6. Public voting only counted towards 10% of the winners' selection in the jury-voted awards, while it was the sole consideration for the fan's choice awards. At the end of polling, Keighley said that most of the categories had over five million votes each, and there was over eight million voters overall.

Two major award changes were made in the Awards structure for the 2017 show. First, the previous "Best Mobile/Handheld Game" was split into separate "Best Mobile Game" and "Best Handheld Game" awards, reflecting the differences in how handheld and mobile games are developed and marketed. Second, a new award for "Best Ongoing Game" was offered for games that continue to provide new content as a service model. Another new award, the Student Game Award, was established to highlight games developed by students in higher education programs, and was selected from a panel of five industry leaders: Todd Howard, Hideo Kojima, Ilkka Paananen, Kim Swift, and Vince Zampella.

All awards, except for Best Multiplayer, were announced during the December 7 presentation. Keighley reported this was an oversight related to a last-minute change in the trailer material for PlayerUnknown's Battlegrounds (which had won the award), and confirmed the winner the day after. Winners are listed first and shown in bold, and indicated with a double-dagger (‡).

=== Jury-voted awards ===
Game of the Year	Best Game Direction
**The Legend of Zelda: Breath of the Wild – Nintendo**‡; Horizon Zero Dawn – Guerrilla Games/Sony Interactive Entertainment; Persona 5 – Atlus; PlayerUnknown's Battlegrounds – PUBG Corporation; Super Mario Odyssey – Nintendo	**The Legend of Zelda: Breath of the Wild – Nintendo**‡; Horizon Zero Dawn – Guerrilla Games/Sony Interactive Entertainment; Resident Evil 7: Biohazard – Capcom; Super Mario Odyssey – Nintendo; Wolfenstein II: The New Colossus – MachineGames/Bethesda Softworks
Best Narrative	Best Art Direction
**What Remains of Edith Finch – Giant Sparrow/Annapurna Interactive**‡; Hellblade: Senua's Sacrifice – Ninja Theory; Horizon Zero Dawn – Guerrilla Games/Sony Interactive Entertainment; Nier: Automata – PlatinumGames/Square Enix; Wolfenstein II: The New Colossus – MachineGames/Bethesda Softworks	**Cuphead – Studio MDHR**‡; Destiny 2 – Bungie/Activision; Horizon Zero Dawn – Guerrilla Games/Sony Interactive Entertainment; Persona 5 – Atlus; The Legend of Zelda: Breath of the Wild – Nintendo
Best Score/Music	Best Audio Design
**Nier: Automata – PlatinumGames/Square Enix**‡; Cuphead – Studio MDHR; Destiny 2 – Bungie/Activision; Persona 5 – Atlus; Super Mario Odyssey – Nintendo; The Legend of Zelda: Breath of the Wild – Nintendo	**Hellblade: Senua's Sacrifice – Ninja Theory**‡; Destiny 2 – Bungie/Activision; Resident Evil 7: Biohazard – Capcom; Super Mario Odyssey – Nintendo; The Legend of Zelda: Breath of the Wild – Nintendo
Best Performance	Games for Impact
**Melina Juergens as Senua – Hellblade: Senua's Sacrifice**‡; Ashly Burch as Aloy – Horizon Zero Dawn; Brian Bloom as B.J. Blazkowicz – Wolfenstein II: The New Colossus; Claudia Black as Chloe Frazer – Uncharted: The Lost Legacy; Laura Bailey as Nadine Ross – Uncharted: The Lost Legacy	**Hellblade: Senua's Sacrifice – Ninja Theory**‡; Bury Me, My Love – The Pixel Hunt; Life Is Strange: Before the Storm – Deck Nine; Night in the Woods – Infinite Fall; Please Knock on My Door – Levall Games AB; What Remains of Edith Finch – Giant Sparrow
Best Ongoing Game	Best Independent Game
**Overwatch – Blizzard Entertainment**‡; Destiny 2 – Bungie; Grand Theft Auto Online – Rockstar Games; PlayerUnknown's Battlegrounds – PUBG Corporation; Tom Clancy's Rainbow Six Siege – Ubisoft; Warframe – Digital Extremes	**Cuphead – Studio MDHR**‡; Hellblade: Senua's Sacrifice – Ninja Theory; Night in the Woods – Infinite Fall; Pyre – Supergiant Games; What Remains of Edith Finch – Giant Sparrow
Best Mobile Game	Best Handheld Game
**Monument Valley 2 – ustwo games**‡; Fire Emblem Heroes – Intelligent Systems; Hidden Folks – Adriaan de Jongh and Sylvain Tegroeg; Old Man's Journey – Broken Rules; Super Mario Run – Nintendo	**Metroid: Samus Returns – MercurySteam/Nintendo**‡; Ever Oasis – Grezzo; Fire Emblem Echoes: Shadows of Valentia – Intelligent Systems; Monster Hunter Stories – Marvelous Entertainment; Poochy and Yoshi's Woolly World – Good-Feel
Best VR/AR Game	Best Action Game
**Resident Evil 7: Biohazard – Capcom**‡; Farpoint – Impulse Gear; Lone Echo – Ready at Dawn; Star Trek: Bridge Crew – Red Storm Entertainment; Superhot VR – Superhot Team	**Wolfenstein II: The New Colossus – MachineGames/Bethesda Softworks**‡; Cuphead – Studio MDHR; Destiny 2 – Bungie/Activision; Nioh – Team Ninja; Prey – Arkane Studios/Bethesda Softworks
Best Action/Adventure	Best Role Playing Game
**The Legend of Zelda: Breath of the Wild – Nintendo**‡; Assassin's Creed: Origins – Ubisoft; Horizon Zero Dawn – Guerrilla Games/Sony Interactive Entertainment; Super Mario Odyssey – Nintendo; Uncharted: The Lost Legacy – Naughty Dog/Sony Interactive Entertainment	**Persona 5 – Atlus**‡; Divinity: Original Sin II – Larian Studios; Final Fantasy XV – Square Enix; Nier: Automata – PlatinumGames/Square Enix; South Park: The Fractured but Whole – Ubisoft
Best Fighting Game	Best Family Game
**Injustice 2 – NetherRealm Studios**‡; ARMS – Nintendo; Marvel vs. Capcom: Infinite – Capcom; Nidhogg 2 – Messhof Games; Tekken 7 – Bandai Namco	**Super Mario Odyssey – Nintendo**‡; Mario Kart 8 Deluxe – Nintendo, Bandai Namco; Mario + Rabbids Kingdom Battle – Ubisoft; Sonic Mania – Christian Whitehead, PagodaWest Games, Headcannon; Splatoon 2 – Nintendo
Best Strategy Game	Best Sports/Racing Game
**Mario + Rabbids Kingdom Battle – Ubisoft**‡; Halo Wars 2 – Creative Assembly and 343 Industries; Total War: Warhammer II – Creative Assembly; Tooth and Tail – Pocketwatch Games; XCOM 2: War of the Chosen – Firaxis Games	**Forza Motorsport 7 – Turn 10 Studios**‡; FIFA 18 – EA Vancouver; Gran Turismo Sport – Polyphony Digital; NBA 2K18 – Visual Concepts; Pro Evolution Soccer 2018 – Konami; Project Cars 2 – Slightly Mad Studios
Best Multiplayer	Student Game Award
**PlayerUnknown's Battlegrounds – PUBG Corporation**‡; Call of Duty: WWII – Sledgehammer Games/Activision; Destiny 2 – Bungie/Activision; Fortnite – Epic Games; Mario Kart 8 Deluxe – Nintendo; Splatoon 2 – Nintendo	**Level Squared – Kip Brennan, Stephen Scoglio, and Dane Perry Svendsen, Swinburne University**‡; Falling Sky – Jonathan Nielssen, Nikolay Savov, and Mohsen Shah, National Film and Television School; From Light – Alejandro Grossman, Steven Li, and Sherveen Uduwana, University of Southern California; Hollowed – Erin Marek, Jerrick Flores, and Charley Choucard, University of Central Florida; Impulsion – Hugo Verger, Remi Bertrand, and Maxime Lupinski, Institut de l'Internet et du Multimédia; Meaning – Hariz Yet, DigiPen Institute of Technology Singapore
Best Debut Indie Game
**Cuphead** **– Studio MDHR‡**; Golf Story – Sidebar Games; Hollow Knight – Team Cherry; Mr. Shifty – Team Shifty; Slime Rancher – Monomi Park

=== Fan's choice awards ===
Most Anticipated Game	Trending Gamer
**The Last of Us Part II** – Naughty Dog; God of War – Santa Monica Studio; Marvel's Spider-Man – Insomniac Games; Monster Hunter: World – Capcom; Red Dead Redemption 2 – Rockstar Games	**Guy "Dr DisRespect" Beahm**; Andrea Rene; Clint "Halfcoordinated" Lexa; Michael "Shroud" Grzesiek; Steven Spohn
Best Esports Game	Best Esports Player
**Overwatch** – Blizzard Entertainment; Counter-Strike: Global Offensive – Valve; Dota 2 – Valve; League of Legends – Riot Games; Rocket League – Psyonix	**Lee "Faker" Sang-hyeok (SK Telecom T1, League of Legends)**; Marcelo "coldzera" David (SK Gaming, Counter-Strike: GO); Nikola "NiKo" Kovač (FaZe Clan, Counter-Strike: GO); Ryu "ryujehong" Je-hong (Seoul Dynasty, Overwatch); Kurosh "KuroKy" Salehi Takhasomi (Team Liquid, Dota 2)
Best Esports Team	Chinese Fan Game Award
**Cloud9**; FaZe Clan; Lunatic-Hai; SK Telecom T1; Team Liquid	**jx3 HD** – Kingsoft Corporation; Honor of Kings – TiMi Studios; Icey – FantaBlade Network; Gumballs & Dungeons – QcPlay Limited; Monument Valley 2 – ustwo games

=== Honorary awards ===
Industry Icon Award
- **Carol Shaw**

== Games with multiple nominations and awards ==
Multiple nominations
Nominations	Game
6	Destiny 2
6	Horizon Zero Dawn
6	The Legend of Zelda: Breath of the Wild
6	Super Mario Odyssey
5	Cuphead
5	Hellblade: Senua's Sacrifice
4	Persona 5
4	Wolfenstein II: The New Colossus
3	Nier: Automata
3	PlayerUnknown's Battlegrounds
3	Resident Evil 7: Biohazard
3	Uncharted: The Lost Legacy
3	What Remains of Edith Finch
2	Mario + Rabbids Kingdom Battle
2	Mario Kart 8 Deluxe
2	Night in the Woods
2	Overwatch
2	Splatoon 2

Multiple awards
Awards	Game
3	Cuphead
3	Hellblade: Senua's Sacrifice
3	The Legend of Zelda: Breath of the Wild
2	Overwatch
