= Josef Fares =

Swedish film director and video game designer (born 1977)

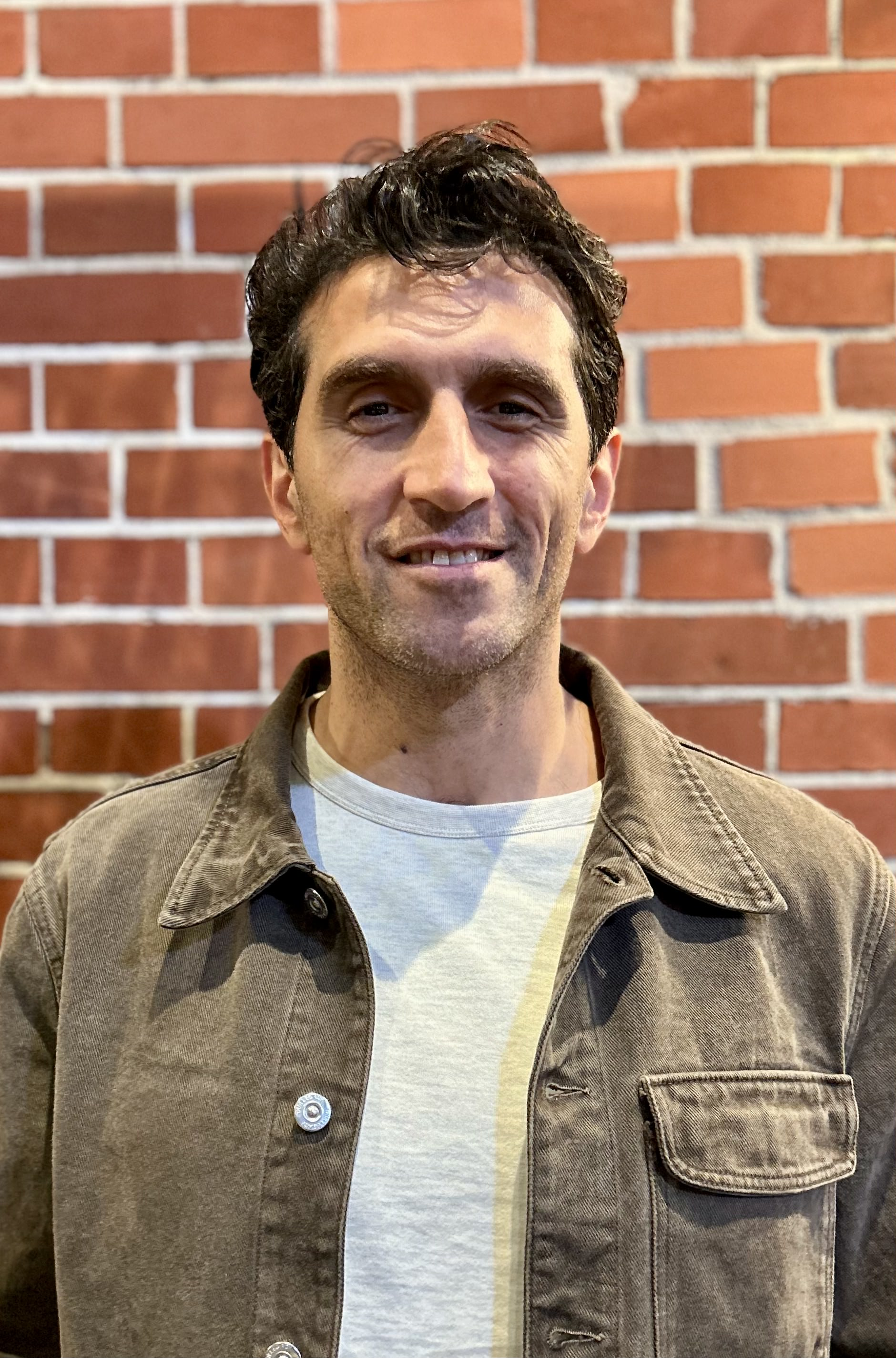
- Fares in May 2025
- Born: 19 September 1977 (age 48); Beirut, Lebanon
- Occupations: Film director, screenwriter, actor, video game designer
- Years active: 1996–present
- Relatives: Fares Fares (brother); Roy Fares (cousin)

Josef Fares (born 19 September 1977) is a Swedish film director and video game designer. His brother is the actor Fares Fares, who has appeared in several of his films and games. He is the founder of Hazelight Studios. He was presented The Game Award for Game of the Year for his game It Takes Two at The Game Awards in 2021. He also directed the game Split Fiction (2025).

== Biography ==
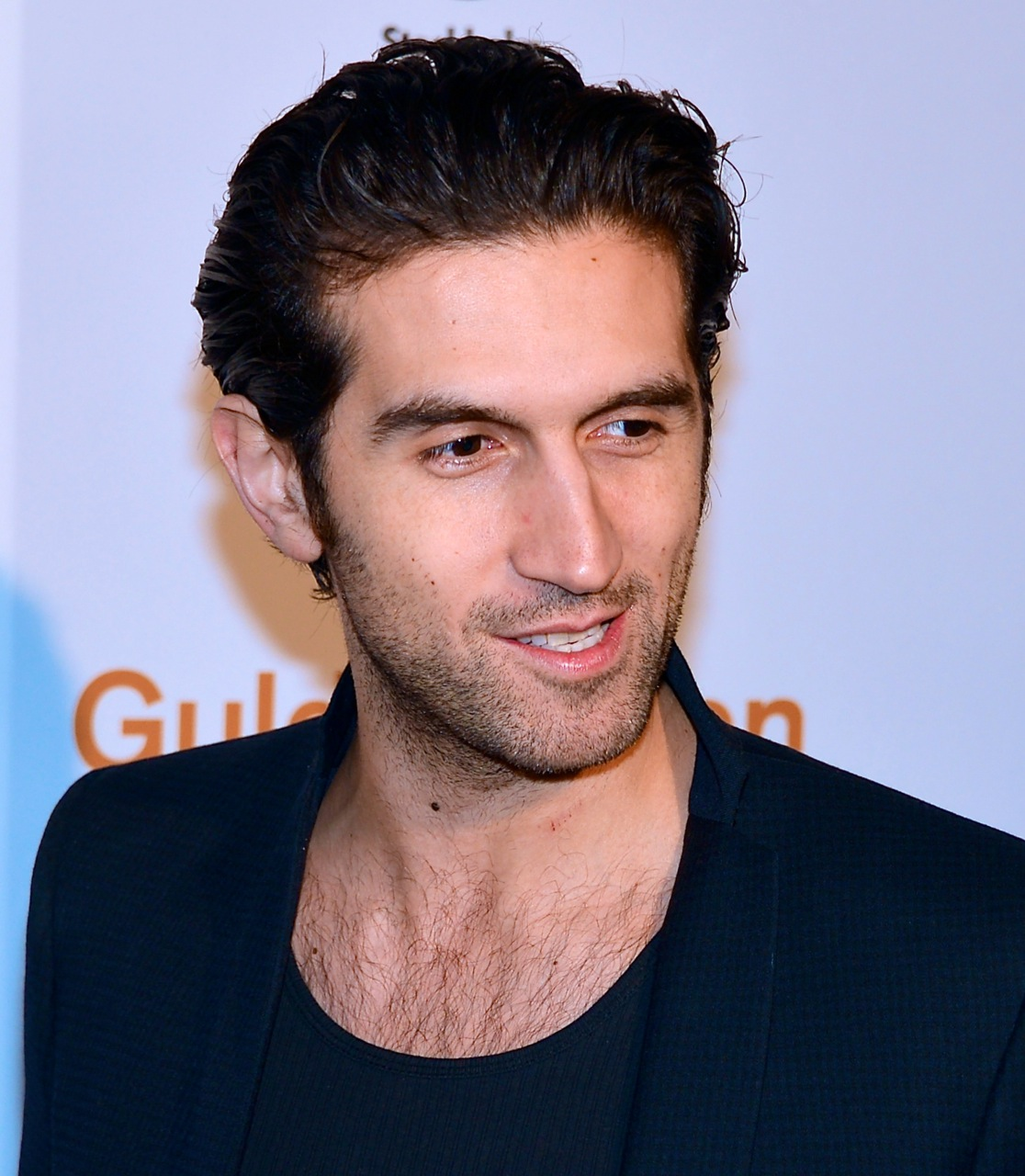
Fares in 2013

Josef Fares moved to Sweden when he was 10 years old, fleeing the Lebanese Civil War with his family. Variety declared him one of ten upcoming directors to watch in 2006. The same year he won the Nordic Council Film Prize for his film Zozo. In 2013, he directed his first video game, Brothers: A Tale of Two Sons. The game was well received by critics. Its focus is on the interaction between two brothers and their journey to save their father. He next formed his own development company, named Hazelight Studios, and partnered with publisher Electronic Arts for his next video game, A Way Out, which was released 23 March 2018.

On 7 December 2017 Fares appeared on The Game Awards 2017 and gave a speech while on stage with host Geoff Keighley, where he strongly criticized the Oscars due to their ranking films above video games.

Fares includes the speech as an Easter egg in his 2021 game It Takes Two. His comments were censored, and he referenced the speech, while saying that the "Oscars got fucked", as he accepted the Game of the Year Award at The Game Awards 2021.

== Industry perspective ==
In an interview to The Washington Post following It Takes Two's win at The Game Awards 2021, Fares expressed his perspective on several topics in the game industry. He said he would "rather get shot in the knee" than include NFTs in future games, he also put forward that adjusting game design to make the player pay is wrong, and stated "For me, gaming is art". Fares has also commented on the topic of sexual harassment within the gaming industry which was brought up at The Game Awards 2021 with respect to Activision Blizzard and its CEO Bobby Kotick, saying "I think sometimes you need to go through some shit to get to the other side. That’s what’s happening", as well as that unions help "but that’s just one of the things. I don’t think it solves everything. Education and knowledge, I think that’s most important."

== Personal life ==
Fares has two daughters, Mio and Zoe. The protagonists of Split Fiction are named after his daughters.

== Filmography ==
Year	Film
2000	Jalla! Jalla!
2003	Kopps
2005	Zozo
2007	Leo
2010	Balls

== Ludography ==
Year	Game	Role	Studio
2013	Brothers: A Tale of Two Sons	Director	Starbreeze Studios
2018	A Way Out	Director	Hazelight Studios
2021	It Takes Two	Director	Hazelight Studios
2025	Split Fiction	Director	Hazelight Studios
TBA	Untitled Josef Fares project	Director	Hazelight Studios
