= Farpoint (video game) =

2017 virtual reality first-person shooter video game

- Developer: Impulse Gear
- Publisher: Sony Interactive Entertainment
- Designer: Seth Luisi
- Programmer: Greg Koreman
- Artist: Randy Nolta
- Writer: Rob Yescombe
- Composer: Stephen Cox
- Engine: Unreal Engine 4
- Platform: PlayStation 4
- Release: May 16, 2017
- Genre: First-person shooter
- Modes: Single-player, multiplayer

Farpoint is a 2017 virtual reality first-person shooter video game developed by Impulse Gear and published by Sony Interactive Entertainment for the PlayStation 4. It was released for PlayStation VR to mostly positive reviews.

== Gameplay ==
Farpoint is a virtual reality space adventure set on a hostile alien planet. It can be played with the PS VR Aim Controller. It also features online cooperative play, and includes a single-player campaign.

== Development ==
Farpoint was announced at E3 2016. It was developed by San Francisco-based developer Impulse Gear. A downloadable expansion called Cryo Pack was released on June 27, which featured new maps and levels. A second downloadable content pack called Versus Expansion Pack was released on December 5, which featured two new PvP modes, three new player skins and 15 new weapons, in addition to a progressive XP system.

== Reception ==
Reception

Aggregate scores
Aggregator	Score
Metacritic	71/100
OpenCritic	25% recommend

Review scores
Publication	Score
Destructoid	7/10
Edge	7/10
Electronic Gaming Monthly	2/5
Game Informer	7/10
GameSpot	7/10
IGN	7.5/10
PlayStation Official Magazine – UK	8/10
Polygon	7.5/10
USgamer	3/5
Road to VR	8.2/10
Wired	8/10
UploadVR	7.5/10

Farpoint received generally positive reviews and has a score of 71% on Metacritic. Fellow review aggregator OpenCritic assessed that the game received fair approval, being recommended by 25% of critics.

IGN awarded it a score of 7.5 out of 10, saying "Fantastic gunplay and freedom of movement sets PSVR's Farpoint apart from most VR shooting galleries." GameSpot awarded it 7 out of 10, saying "Despite shifting gears in surprising ways and extending the life of its gunplay by remixing levels, Farpoint is more like a proof of concept than a game designed to push the envelope on its own terms." Game Informer also awarded it 7 out of 10, saying "Farpoint may not move the needle as a shooter, but it's a sound VR experience." Destructoid similarly awarded it 7 out of 10, and said "the biggest problem is that all of these technical advancements aren't backed up by a setting that does it justice."

Farpoint sold 17,100 copies within its first week on sale in Japan. It debuted at number two on the UK sales charts, and was the highest-charting VR-required game in the UK.

=== Accolades ===
The game won both the PlayStation VR Award at the PlayStation Awards 2017, and the PlayStation VR Game of the Year award at the Road to VR's 2017 Game of the Year Awards. It was also nominated for "Best PS VR Experience" at PlayStation Blog's Game of the Year Awards.

Year	Award	Category	Result	Ref.
2017	The Independent Game Developers' Association (TIGA)	Action and Adventure Game	Nominated	
2017	Golden Joystick Awards	Best VR Game	Nominated	
2017	Hollywood Music in Media Awards	Original Score - Video Game	Won	
2017	The Game Awards 2017	Best VR/AR Game	Nominated	
2018	National Academy of Video Game Trade Reviewers Awards	Control Design, VR	Nominated	
2018	National Academy of Video Game Trade Reviewers Awards	Direction in Virtual Reality	Nominated	
2018	National Academy of Video Game Trade Reviewers Awards	Game, Original Action	Nominated	
2018	National Academy of Video Game Trade Reviewers Awards	Innovation in Game Technology	Nominated	
2018	Game Developers Choice Awards	Best VR/AR Game	Nominated	
2018	2018 Webby Awards	Best Music/Sound Design	Won	
