= The Game Award for Game of the Year =

Video game award

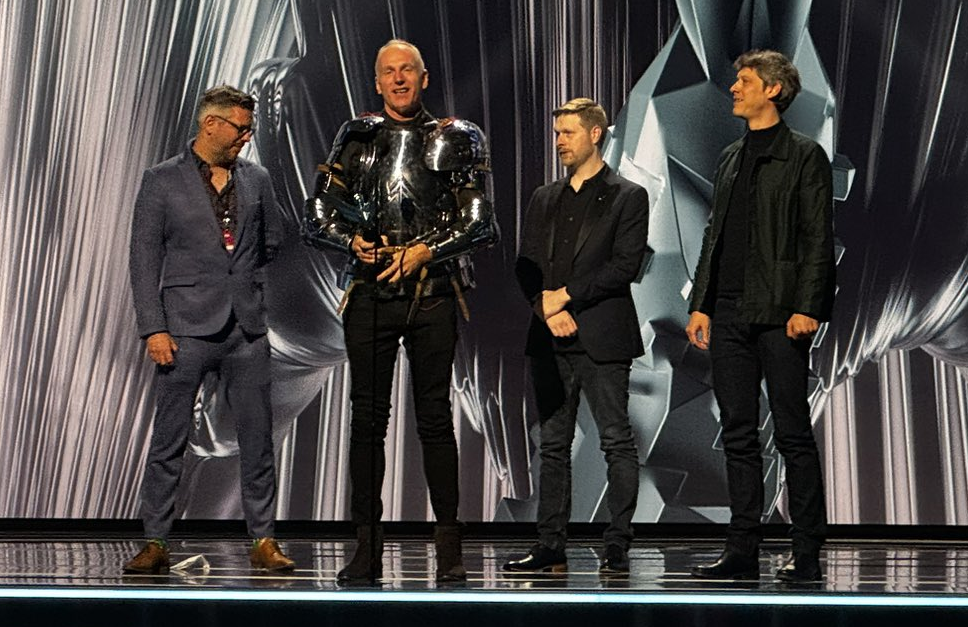
- Larian Studios won Game of the Year for Baldur's Gate 3 in 2023.
- Awarded for: Best video game of the year
- Country: United States
- Presented by: The Game Awards
- First award: December 5, 2014; 11 years ago
- Most recent winner: Clair Obscur: Expedition 33 (2025)

Highlights
- Most awards: Sony Interactive Entertainment (3)
- Most nominations: Sony Interactive Entertainment (14)
- Website: thegameawards.com

The Game Award for Game of the Year is an award presented annually by The Game Awards. It is given to a video game judged to deliver the best experience across creative and technical fields. The award is traditionally accepted by the game's directors or studio executives. The process begins with over 100 video game publications and websites, which collectively name six games as nominees. After the nominees are selected, the winner is chosen by a combined vote between the jury (90%) and public voting (10%).

Since its inception, the award has been given to eleven video games. Publisher Sony Interactive Entertainment has won the award three times and been nominated a record fourteen times, while FromSoftware is the only developer with more than one win. Bethesda Softworks and Capcom are the most nominated companies without a win at four. The most recent winner is Clair Obscur: Expedition 33 by Sandfall Interactive.

== Process and history ==
The Game Awards has a voting jury consisting of over 100 video game media and influencer outlets, which have been specifically selected for their work in critically evaluating video games. Each outlet completes an unranked ballot listing its top five choices; games with the most appearances across the ballots are selected as the nominees. The winners are determined between the jury (90%) and public voting (10%). The public vote is held via the official website and social media platforms such as Discord, Facebook, and Twitter; in China, fan voting is held via Bilibili.

Any game released before a certain date in November prior to the ceremony is eligible for award consideration. As a result, any game released after the cutoff date is eligible in the following year's ceremony, such as 2018's Super Smash Bros. Ultimate nominations at the Game Awards 2019; similarly, games released between the ballot due date in early November and the cutoff date in mid-to-late November are often overlooked, such as Star Wars Jedi: Fallen Order in both 2019 and 2020 (Note: Star Wars Jedi: Fallen Order was released prior to the cutoff date of The Game Awards 2019 but was considered ineligible and did not receive any formal nominations (it placed third in the fan-voted Player's Voice Award); it received one nomination in 2020.) and Demon's Souls and Marvel's Spider-Man: Miles Morales in 2020. Early access games available before the cutoff date are eligible, as are live service games regardless of their release year: 2018's Among Us received several nominations in 2020.

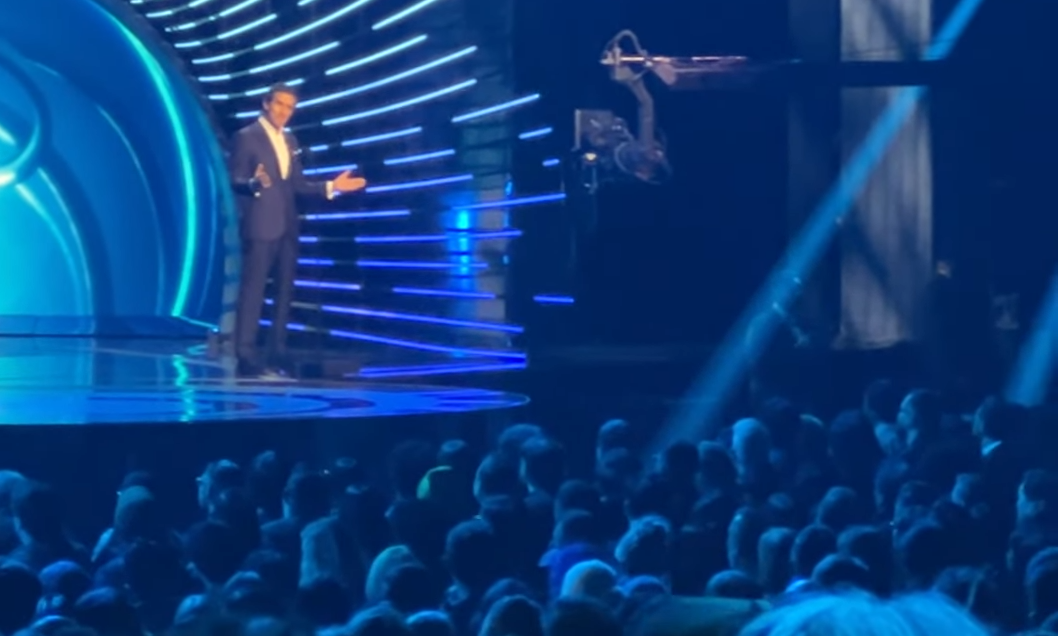
Josef Fares presenting Game of the Year at The Game Awards 2022

The Game Award for Game of the Year is given to a video game judged to deliver the best experience across creative and technical fields. It is presented as the final award of the ceremony and is widely considered its most prestigious honor. Since 2017, the announcement of the winner has been preceded by a medley performance of the scores of each nominee by the Game Awards Orchestra, conducted by Lorne Balfe. The category was expanded from five to six nominees in 2018.

The award is traditionally accepted by the director of the winning game or an executive from the studio; the first award in 2014 was accepted by Dragon Age: Inquisition executive producer Mark Darrah and BioWare general manager Aaryn Flynn. The Game Awards host and producer Geoff Keighley presented the award for the first four ceremonies. Other presenters include directors of past winners—such as 2016 winner Overwatch's lead director Jeff Kaplan in 2018, 2020 winner The Last of Us Part II's creative director Neil Druckmann in 2021, 2021 winner It Takes Two's director Josef Fares in 2022, 2023 winner Baldur's Gate 3's director Swen Vincke in 2024, and 2024 winner Astro Bot's director Nicolas Doucet in 2025—and celebrity guests like Vin Diesel and Michelle Rodriguez in 2019, Christopher Nolan in 2020, and Timothée Chalamet in 2023.

== Winners and nominees ==
Acceptees of the award

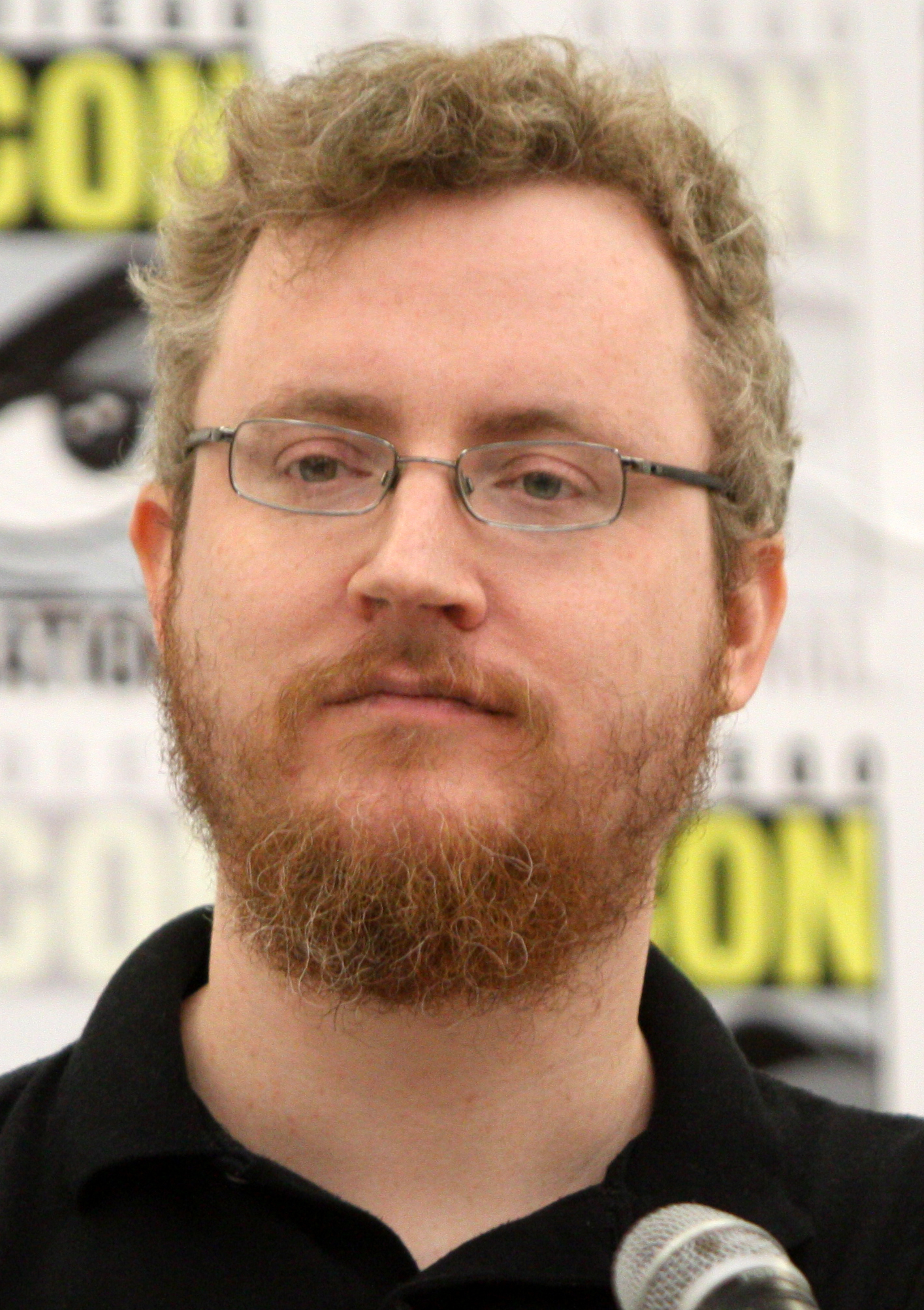
Mark Darrah for Dragon Age: Inquisition (2014)

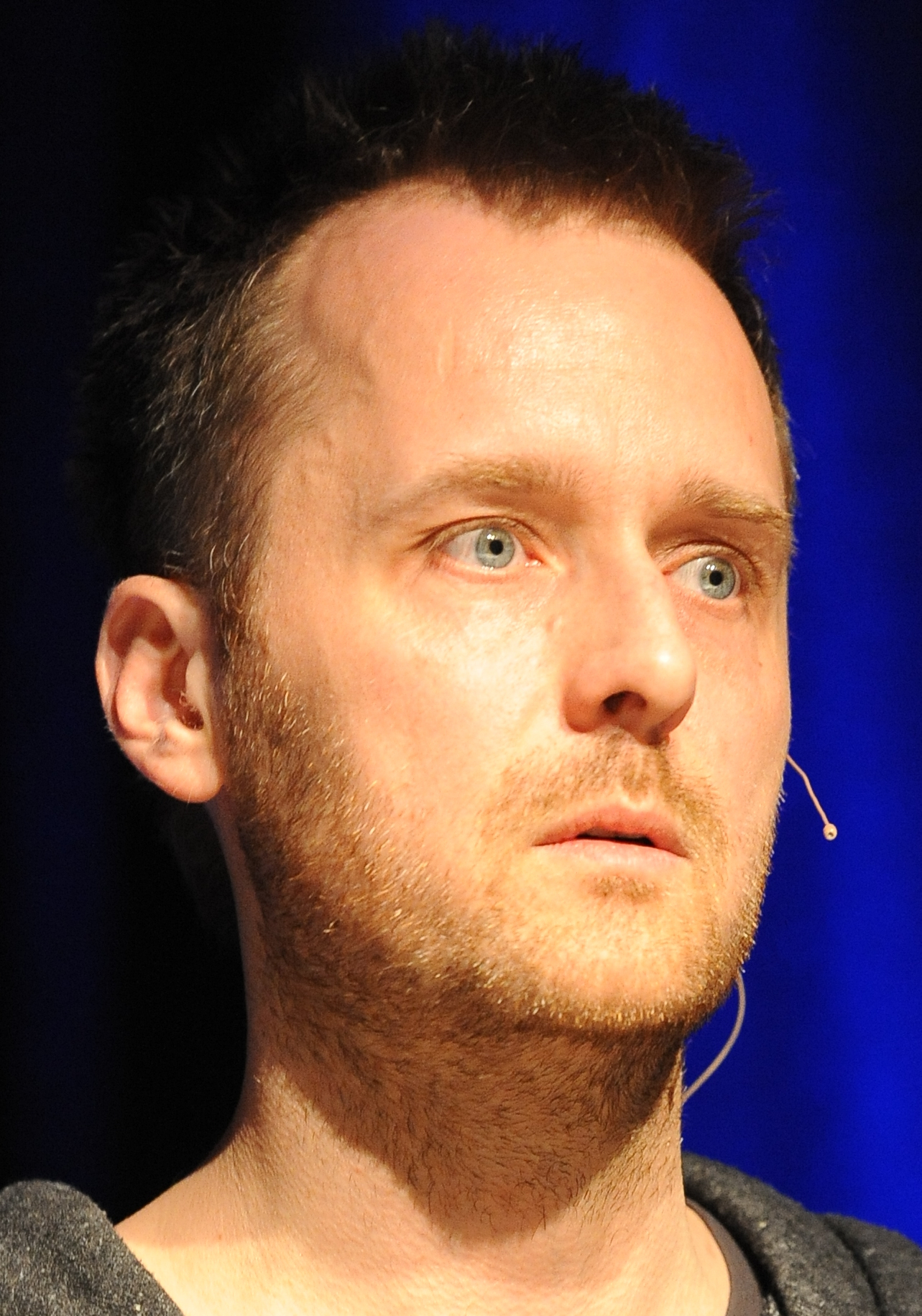
Marcin Iwiński for The Witcher 3: Wild Hunt (2015)

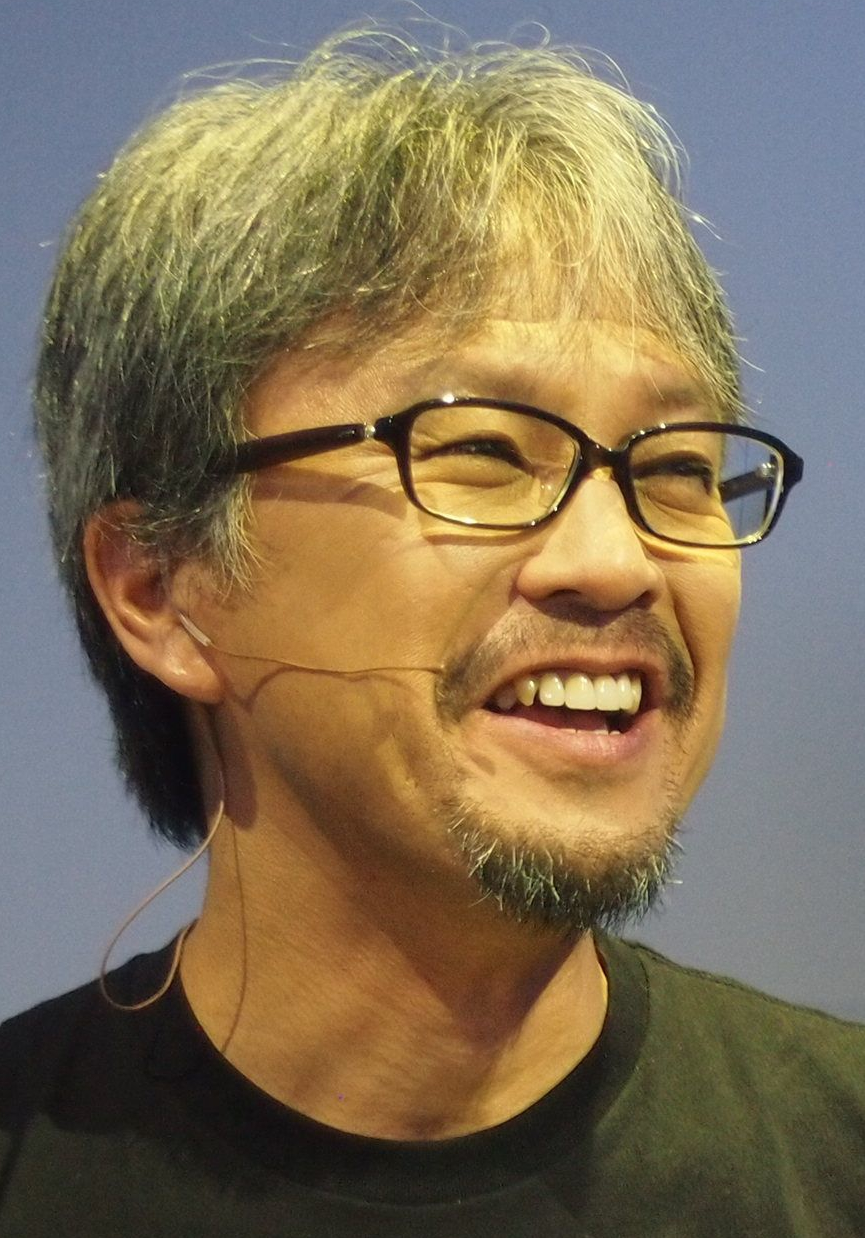

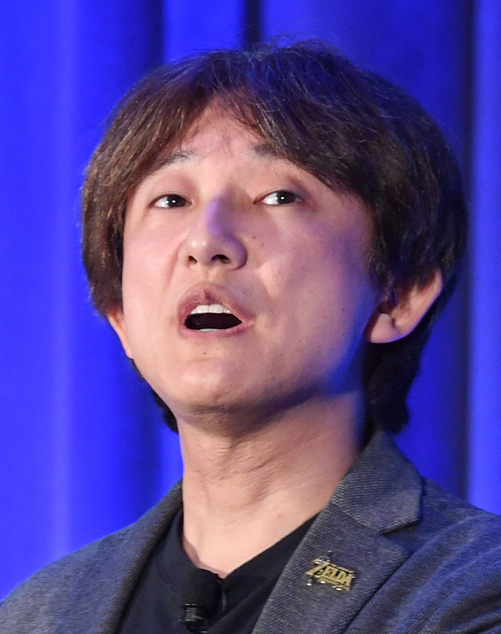
Eiji Aonuma and Hidemaro Fujibayashi for The Legend of Zelda: Breath of the Wild (2017)

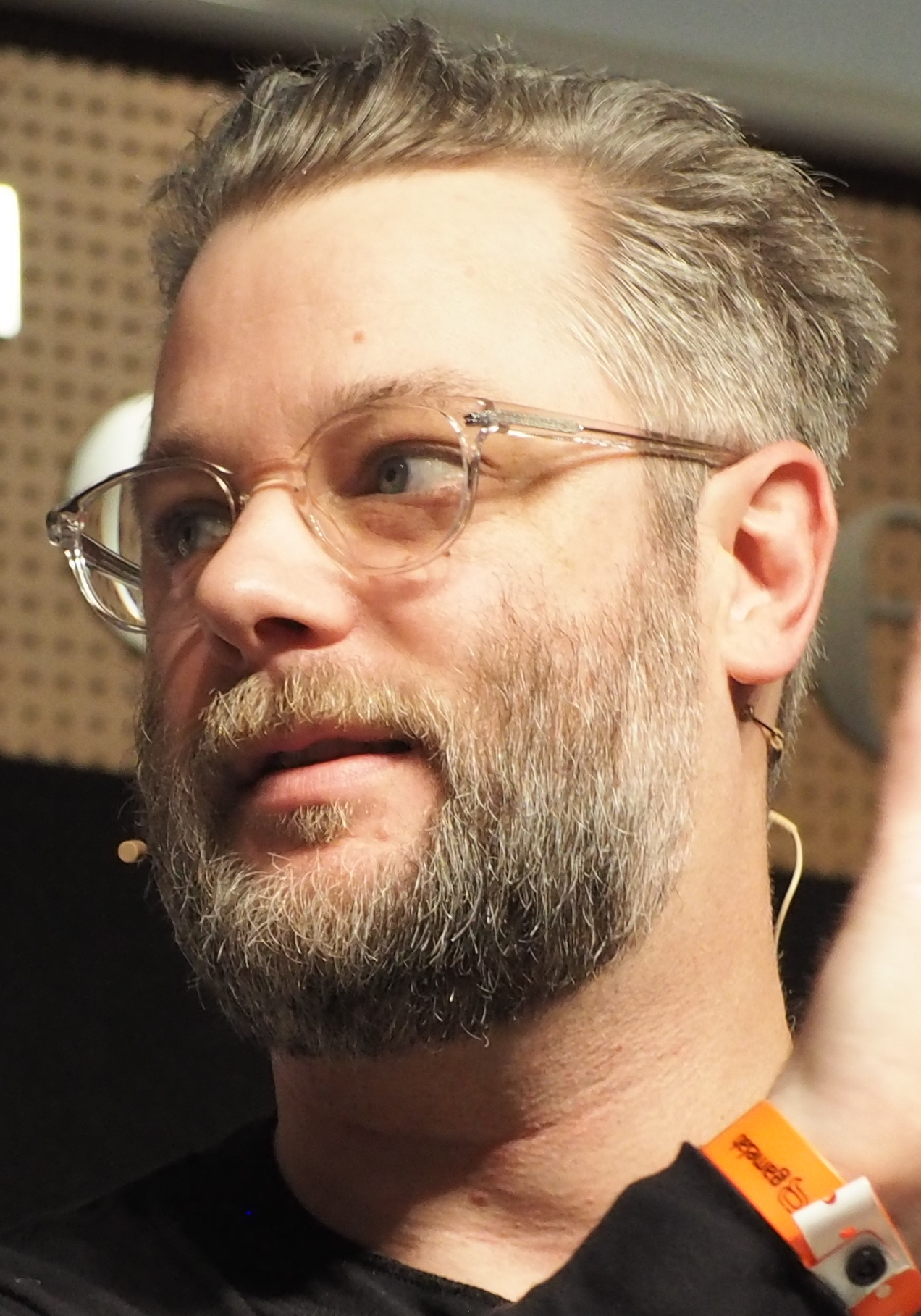
Cory Barlog for God of War (2018)

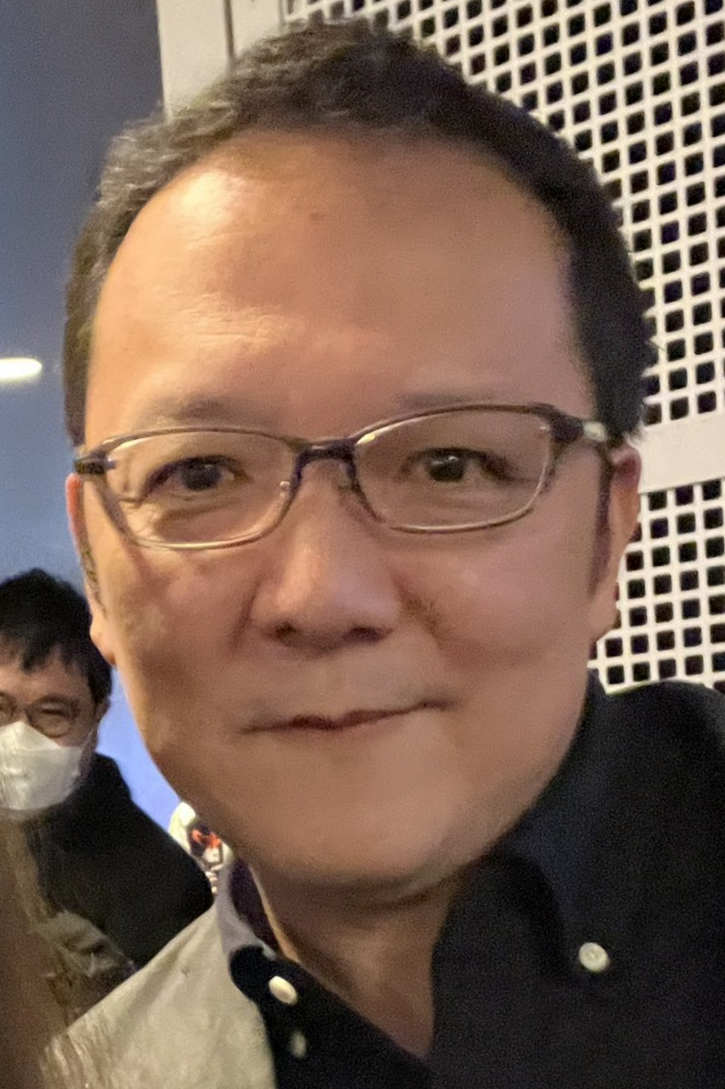
Hidetaka Miyazaki for Sekiro: Shadows Die Twice (2019) and Elden Ring (2022)

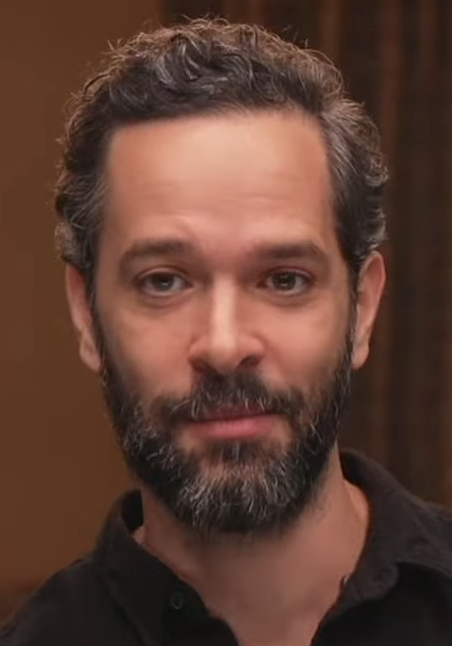
Neil Druckmann for The Last of Us Part II (2020)

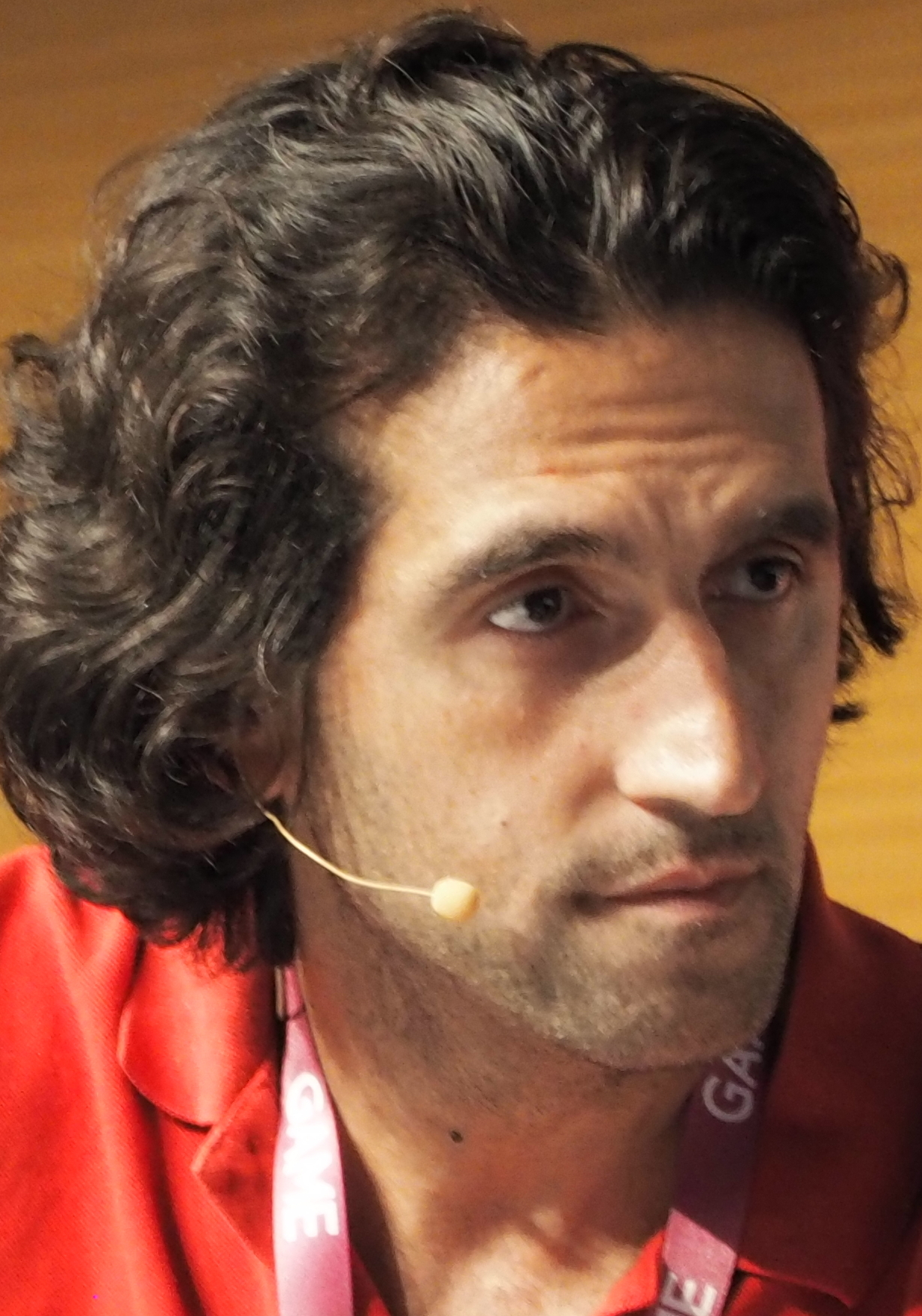
Josef Fares for It Takes Two (2021)

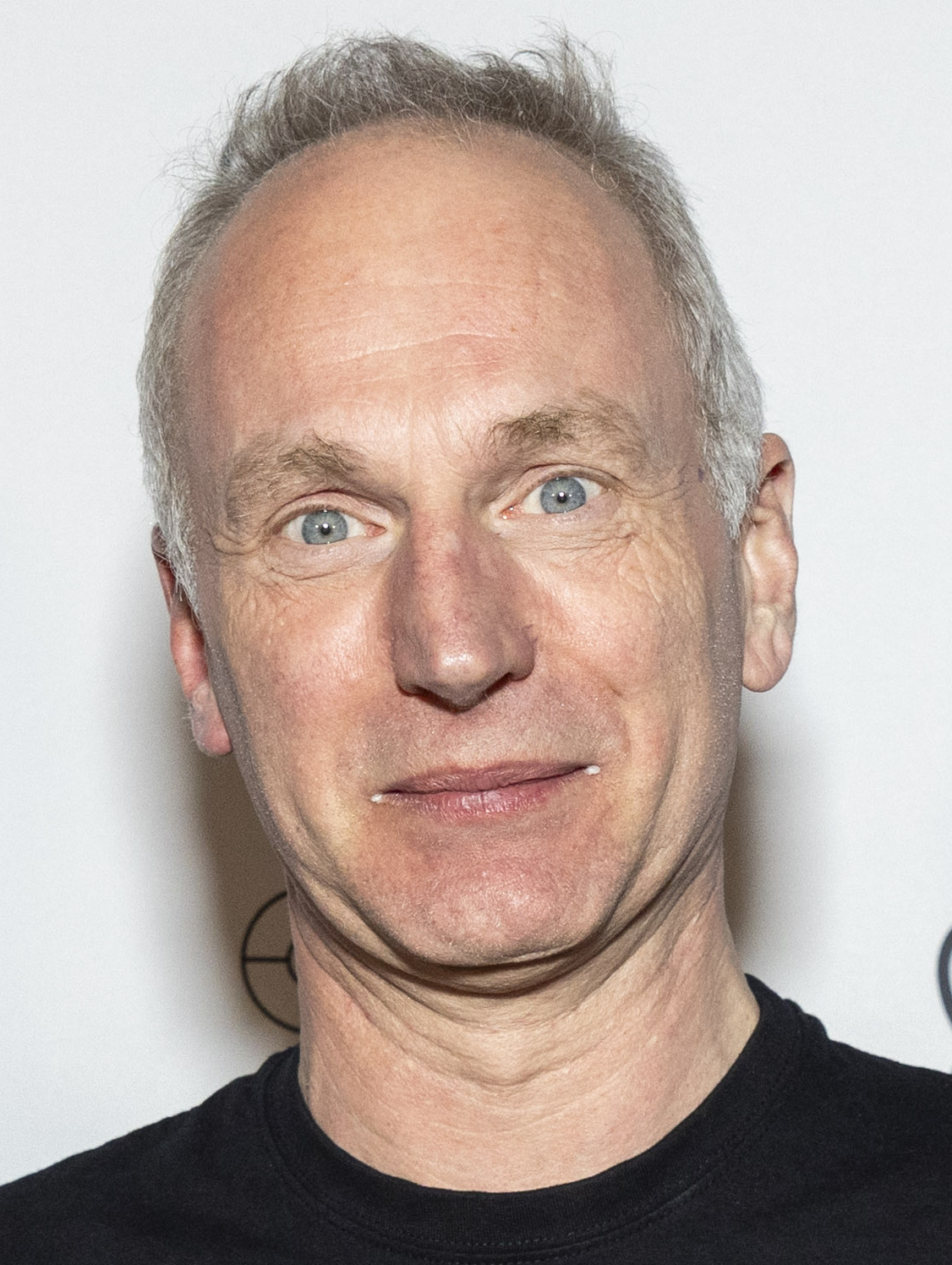
Swen Vincke for Baldur's Gate 3 (2023)

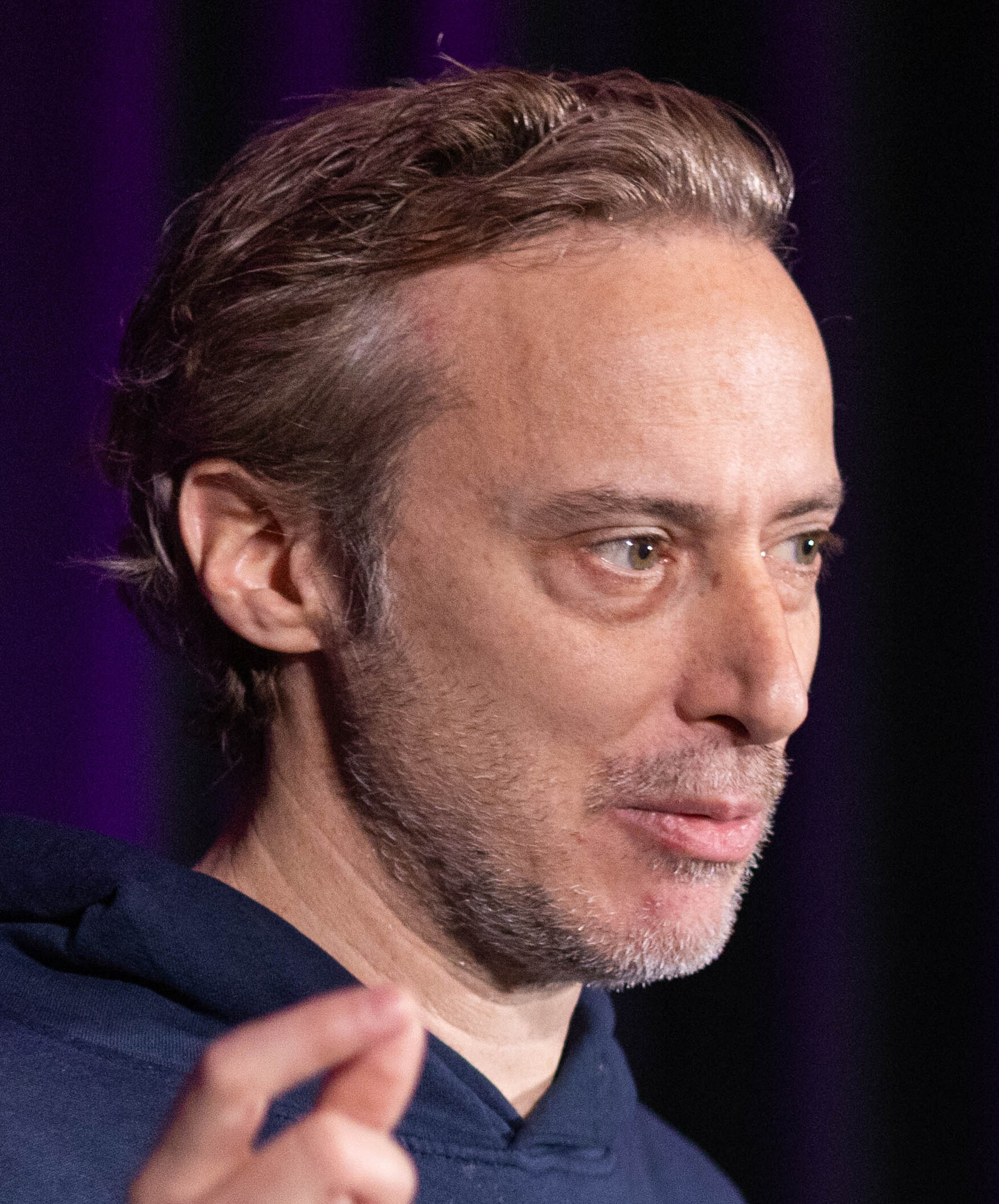

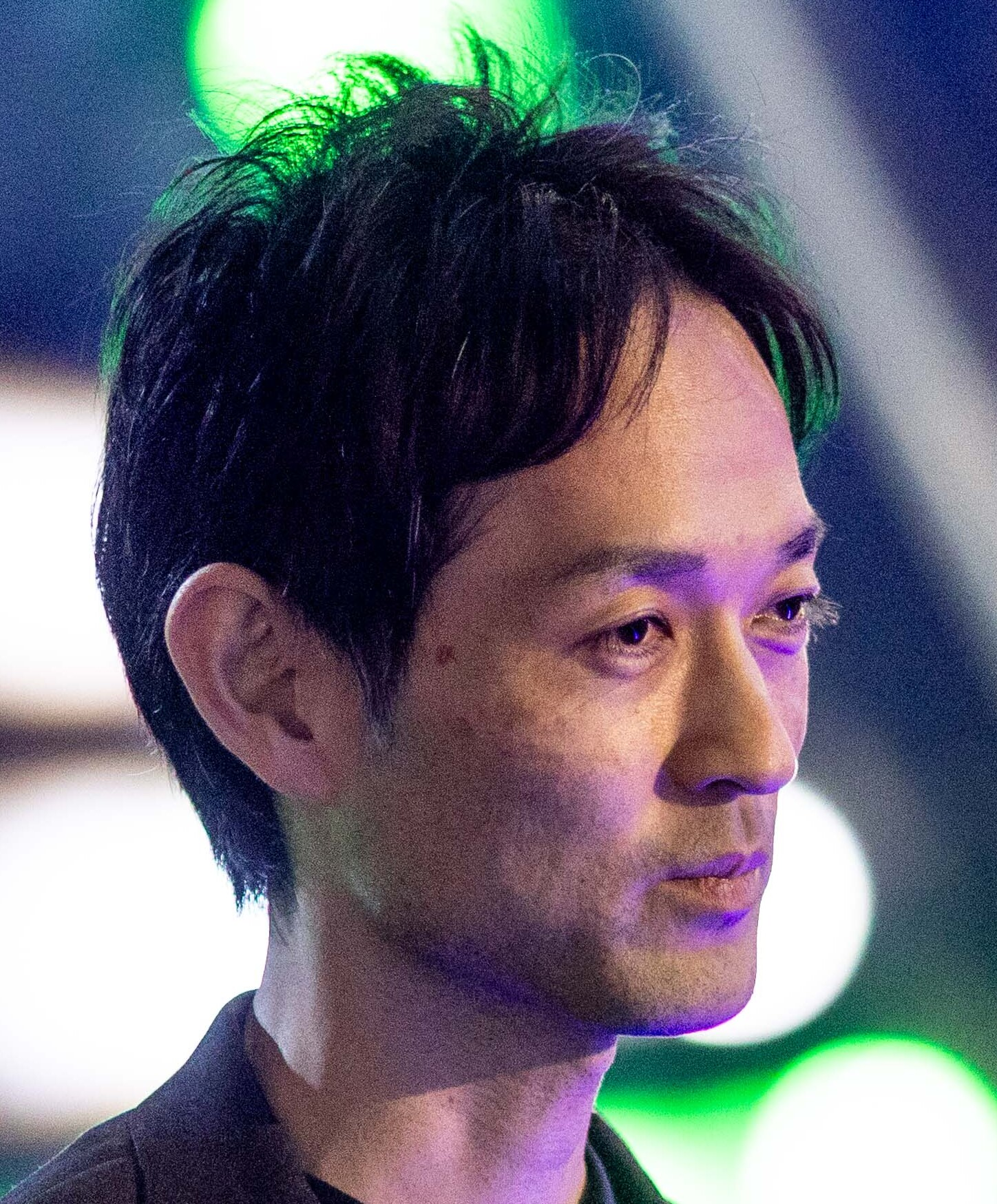
Nicolas Doucet and Masayuki Yamada for Astro Bot (2024)

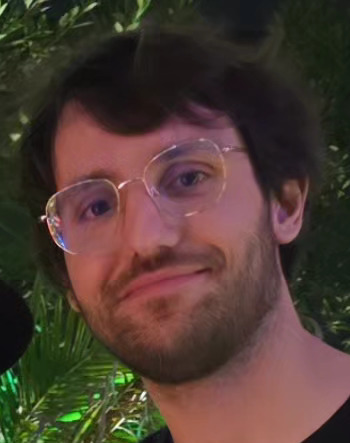
Guillaume Broche for Clair Obscur: Expedition 33 (2025)

Winners are listed first, highlighted in yellow and boldface, and indicated with a double dagger (‡).

Winners and nominees
Event	Game	Developer	Publisher	Ref.
2014	**Dragon Age: Inquisition** ‡	**BioWare**	**Electronic Arts**	
2014	Bayonetta 2	PlatinumGames	Nintendo	
2014	Dark Souls II	FromSoftware	Bandai Namco Games	
2014	Hearthstone	Blizzard Entertainment		
2014	Middle-earth: Shadow of Mordor	Monolith Productions	Warner Bros. Interactive Entertainment	
2015	**The Witcher 3: Wild Hunt** ‡	**CD Projekt Red**	**CD Projekt**	
2015	Bloodborne	FromSoftware	Sony Computer Entertainment	
2015	Fallout 4	Bethesda Game Studios	Bethesda Softworks	
2015	Metal Gear Solid V: The Phantom Pain	Kojima Productions	Konami	
2015	Super Mario Maker	Nintendo EAD	Nintendo	
2016	**Overwatch** ‡	**Blizzard Entertainment**		
2016	Doom	id Software	Bethesda Softworks	
2016	Inside	Playdead		
2016	Titanfall 2	Respawn Entertainment	Electronic Arts	
2016	Uncharted 4: A Thief's End	Naughty Dog	Sony Computer Entertainment	
2017	**The Legend of Zelda: Breath of the Wild** ‡	**Nintendo EPD**	**Nintendo**	
2017	Horizon Zero Dawn	Guerrilla Games	Sony Interactive Entertainment	
2017	Persona 5	P-Studio	Atlus	
2017	PlayerUnknown's Battlegrounds	PUBG Corporation		
2017	Super Mario Odyssey	Nintendo EPD	Nintendo	
2018	**God of War** ‡	**Santa Monica Studio**	**Sony Interactive Entertainment**	
2018	Assassin's Creed Odyssey	Ubisoft Quebec	Ubisoft	
2018	Celeste	Maddy Makes Games		
2018	Marvel's Spider-Man	Insomniac Games	Sony Interactive Entertainment	
2018	Monster Hunter: World	Capcom		
2018	Red Dead Redemption 2	Rockstar Games		
2019	**Sekiro: Shadows Die Twice** ‡	**FromSoftware**	**Activision**	
2019	Control	Remedy Entertainment	505 Games	
2019	Death Stranding	Kojima Productions	Sony Interactive Entertainment	
2019	Resident Evil 2	Capcom		
2019	Super Smash Bros. Ultimate	Bandai Namco Studios	Nintendo	
2019	Super Smash Bros. Ultimate	Sora Ltd.	Nintendo	
2019	The Outer Worlds	Obsidian Entertainment	Private Division	
2020	**The Last of Us Part II** ‡	**Naughty Dog**	**Sony Interactive Entertainment**	
2020	Animal Crossing: New Horizons	Nintendo EPD	Nintendo	
2020	Doom Eternal	id Software	Bethesda Softworks	
2020	Final Fantasy VII Remake	Square Enix		
2020	Ghost of Tsushima	Sucker Punch Productions	Sony Interactive Entertainment	
2020	Hades	Supergiant Games		
2021	**It Takes Two** ‡	**Hazelight Studios**	**Electronic Arts**	
2021	Deathloop	Arkane Studios	Bethesda Softworks	
2021	Metroid Dread	MercurySteam	Nintendo	
2021	Psychonauts 2	Double Fine	Xbox Game Studios	
2021	Ratchet & Clank: Rift Apart	Insomniac Games	Sony Interactive Entertainment	
2021	Resident Evil Village	Capcom		
2022	**Elden Ring** ‡	**FromSoftware**	**Bandai Namco Entertainment**	
2022	A Plague Tale: Requiem	Asobo Studio	Focus Entertainment	
2022	God of War Ragnarök	Santa Monica Studio	Sony Interactive Entertainment	
2022	Horizon Forbidden West	Guerrilla Games	Sony Interactive Entertainment	
2022	Stray	BlueTwelve Studio	Annapurna Interactive	
2022	Xenoblade Chronicles 3	Monolith Soft	Nintendo	
2023	**Baldur's Gate 3** ‡	**Larian Studios**		
2023	Alan Wake 2	Remedy Entertainment	Epic Games Publishing	
2023	The Legend of Zelda: Tears of the Kingdom	Nintendo EPD	Nintendo	
2023	Marvel's Spider-Man 2	Insomniac Games	Sony Interactive Entertainment	
2023	Resident Evil 4	Capcom		
2023	Super Mario Bros. Wonder	Nintendo EPD	Nintendo	
2024	**Astro Bot** ‡	**Team Asobi**	**Sony Interactive Entertainment**	
2024	Balatro	LocalThunk	Playstack	
2024	Black Myth: Wukong	Game Science		
2024	Elden Ring Shadow of the Erdtree	FromSoftware	Bandai Namco Entertainment	
2024	Final Fantasy VII Rebirth	Square Enix		
2024	Metaphor: ReFantazio	Studio Zero	Sega (Note: Published in Japan by subsidiary company Atlus)	
2025	**Clair Obscur: Expedition 33** ‡	**Sandfall Interactive**	**Kepler Interactive**	
2025	Death Stranding 2: On the Beach	Kojima Productions	Sony Interactive Entertainment	
2025	Donkey Kong Bananza	Nintendo EPD	Nintendo	
2025	Hades II	Supergiant Games		
2025	Hollow Knight: Silksong	Team Cherry		
2025	Kingdom Come: Deliverance II	Warhorse Studios	Deep Silver	
2026	007 First Light	IO Interactive		
2026	Control Resonant	Remedy Entertainment		
2026	Grand Theft Auto VI	Rockstar Games		
2026	The Legend of Zelda: Ocarina of Time	Nintendo EPD	Nintendo	
2026	Phantom Blade Zero	S-Game		
2026	Resident Evil Requiem	Capcom		

== Multiple nominations and awards ==
=== Developers ===
Developer	Nominations	Wins
Nintendo EPD (Note: Formerly two divisions—Nintendo EAD and Nintendo SPD—before merging in September 2015)	8	1
FromSoftware	5	2
Capcom	5	0
Insomniac Games	3	0
Kojima Productions	3	0
Remedy Entertainment	3	0
Blizzard Entertainment	2	1
Naughty Dog	2	1
Santa Monica Studio	2	1
Guerrilla Games	2	0
id Software	2	0
Rockstar Games	2	0
Square Enix	2	0
Supergiant Games	2	0

=== Publishers ===
Publisher	Nominations	Wins
Sony Interactive Entertainment (Note: Known as Sony Computer Entertainment until April 2016)	14	3
Nintendo	12	1
Capcom	5	0
Bethesda Softworks	4	0
Electronic Arts	3	2
Bandai Namco Entertainment (Note: Known as Bandai Namco Games from January 2014 to April 2015)	3	1
Blizzard Entertainment	2	1
Rockstar Games	2	0
Square Enix	2	0
Supergiant Games	2	0

=== Franchises ===
Franchise	Nominations	Wins
Resident Evil	4	0
The Legend of Zelda	3	1
Super Mario	3	0
Elden Ring	2	1
God of War	2	1
Control	2	0
Death Stranding	2	0
Doom	2	0
Final Fantasy	2	0
Hades	2	0
Horizon	2	0
Marvel's Spider-Man	2	0
