= It Takes Two (video game) =

2021 video game

- Developer: Hazelight Studios (Note: Ported to Nintendo Switch by Turn Me Up Games)
- Publisher: Electronic Arts (Note: Published under the EA Originals label)
- Director: Josef Fares
- Producer: Aimar Bergan
- Programmer: Lucas de Vries
- Artist: Claes Engdal
- Writers: Soni Jorgensen; Josef Fares
- Composers: Gustaf Grefberg; Kristofer Eng
- Engine: Unreal Engine 4
- Platforms: PlayStation 4; PlayStation 5; Windows; Xbox One; Xbox Series X/S; Nintendo Switch; Nintendo Switch 2
- Release: PS4, PS5, Windows, Xbox One, Xbox Series X/S: WW: March 26, 2021; Nintendo Switch: WW: November 4, 2022; Nintendo Switch 2: WW: October 15, 2026
- Genre: Action-adventure
- Mode: Multiplayer

It Takes Two is a 2021 cooperative action-adventure game developed by Hazelight Studios and published by Electronic Arts. It was released for PlayStation 4, PlayStation 5, Windows, Xbox One, and Xbox Series X/S in March 2021, for Nintendo Switch in November 2022, and for Nintendo Switch 2 in October 2026. The game follows Cody and May, a husband and wife on the brink of divorce whose daughter unknowingly transports their consciousnesses into handmade dolls, forcing to work together as they try to repair their relationship and return to their human bodies.

The game is designed around two-player cooperative multiplayer, playable either online or locally in split-screen. Gameplay combines platforming, puzzle-solving, and action elements, with both players receiving different abilities that must be used together to progress. Each level introduces new mechanics tied to the story and setting, while optional minigames provide competitive diversions between the two players. Josef Fares directed the game, which Hazelight developed around collaboration as its central design theme.

It Takes Two received critical acclaim, with reviewers praising its cooperative design, mechanical variety, creativity, and connection between gameplay and story. It won multiple year-end awards, including Game of the Year awards at The Game Awards 2021 and the 25th Annual D.I.C.E. Awards. By April 2026, the game had sold over 30 million units, making it one of the best-selling video games. Film and television adaptations were announced in 2022, with the film planned as an Amazon Prime Video release.

== Gameplay ==
It Takes Two is specifically designed for split-screen multiplayer. To progress in the game, the two players must fulfill different roles and achieve their objectives cooperatively.

It Takes Two is a cooperative action-adventure game with elements from platform games. It is designed exclusively for two players, either through local split-screen or online cooperative multiplayer, with each player controlling one of the two player characters, Cody or May. There is no single-player option, and both players are required to work together to progress through the story. The game uses a split-screen presentation for both local and online play, allowing each player to see their own character and their partner's actions at the same time.

Gameplay is built around cooperation, platforming, puzzle-solving, and action sequences. Players travel through a series of fantastical environments based on Cody and May's home and relationship, with each area introducing new objectives, tools, and mechanics. Progress often requires the two players to perform complementary tasks, such as activating mechanisms, creating paths, solving environmental puzzles, or coordinating during combat and boss encounters. If a character dies, they respawn quickly, and during more difficult sections such as boss fights the defeated player can speed up their return by repeatedly pressing a button.

The game frequently gives Cody and May different abilities that are tied to the theme of the current level. For instance, in one level, Cody gains the ability to rewind time, whereas May can replicate herself. In other sections, the characters receive different tools or powers that must be combined to move forward. Hazelight designed the game so that major mechanics change regularly rather than repeating from level to level, with the gameplay ideas connected to the story and setting of each chapter.

In addition to the main cooperative challenges, It Takes Two includes combat encounters, traversal sequences, boss fights, and optional competitive minigames. These minigames are found on short side paths throughout the levels and allow the two players to compete against each other outside the main cooperative objectives, with the game tracking wins and losses between them. The game also draws on several genres, with sections involving platforming, shooting, racing, flight, and arcade-style challenges.

== Plot ==
Cody (Joseph Balderrama) and May (Annabelle Dowler), a married couple, are planning to divorce. After they tell their daughter Rose (Clare Corbett) the news, she takes her hand-made dolls modeled after her parents into the family shed and tries to repair their relationship by play-acting. Rose's tears fall onto the dolls, causing Cody and May's consciousnesses to become trapped inside them. They are then confronted by Dr. Hakim (also Balderrama), an anthropomorphic relationship therapy book, who says he has been tasked with fixing their relationship as they try to reach Rose.

At first, Cody and May focus on reaching Rose, hoping she knows how to return them to their human bodies. Hakim repeatedly interferes with their progress, placing obstacles and tests in their way to force them to collaborate. They also encounter anthropomorphic versions of their old possessions, who criticize Cody and May for neglecting both their belongings and Rose. As they travel around their property, Cody and May are reminded of positive memories from their relationship and begin to work together more effectively. They come close to communicating with Rose several times but learn she cannot see or hear their doll forms, though she can see objects appear to move by themselves as her parents move them.

In a final series of obstacles, Hakim encourages Cody and May to rediscover their passions and support each other. This first takes them through Cody's overgrown, abandoned garden and greenhouse, which May helps him restore. They then work together to help May rediscover her passion for music and singing.

Meanwhile, Rose continues trying to mend her parents' relationship, but Cody and May's real bodies have fallen unconscious and do not respond to her. Believing her parents are ignoring her and that she is the reason their marriage is failing, Rose decides to run away in the hope that it will make them stay together.

After a long journey, Cody and May complete Hakim's final test by gathering an orchestra and audience for May to perform in front of. As May sings, their relationship is repaired, and they kiss, reversing the spell. They awaken in their real bodies and realize that Rose has run away. They find her at a nearby bus stop and assure her that she is not responsible for their arguments and that they will always love her. The family then returns home with a new perspective on their relationship.

== Development and release ==
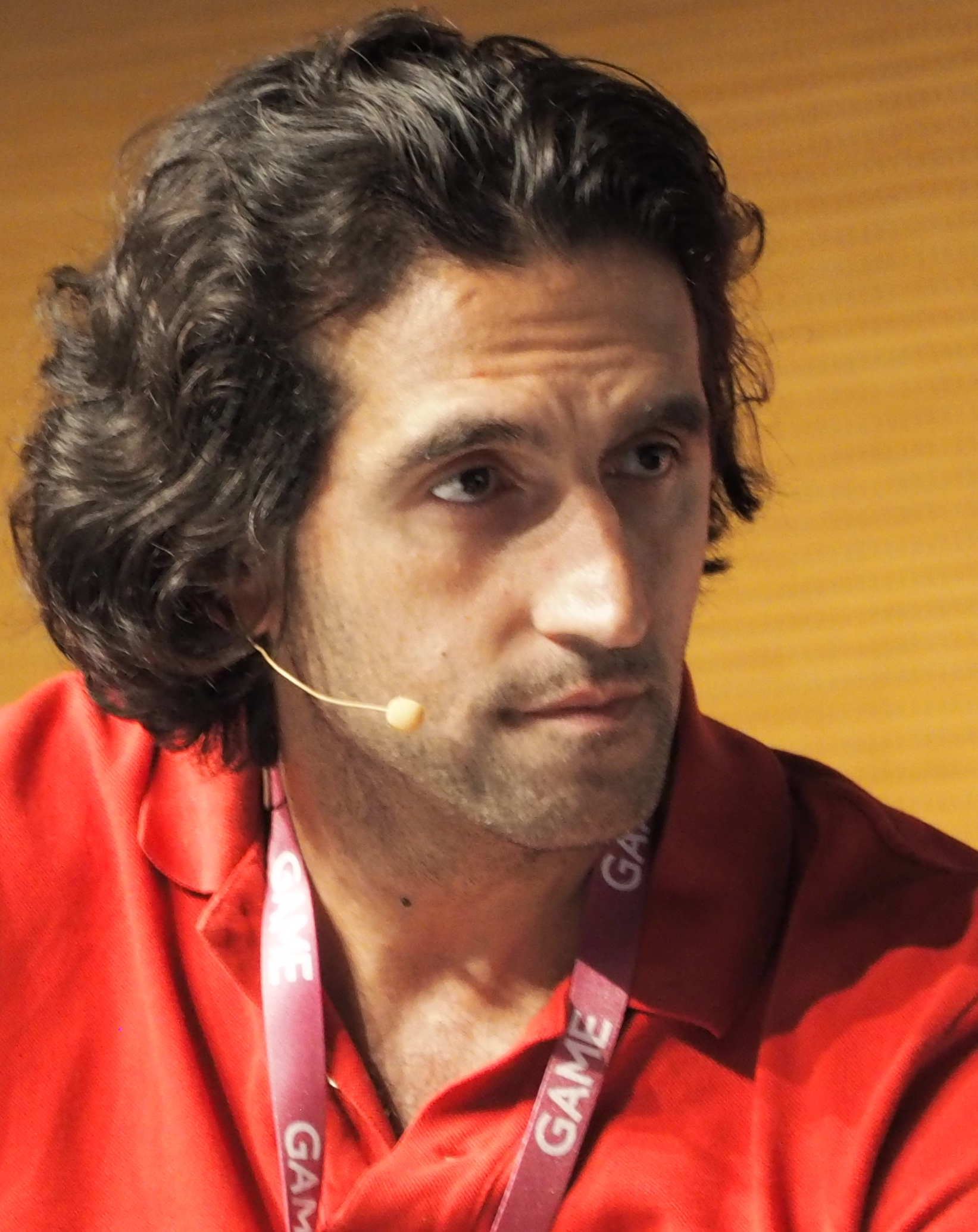
Josef Fares (pictured in 2018) served as the creative director.

Josef Fares, the director of Hazelight's previous game A Way Out (2018) and Starbreeze's Brothers: A Tale of Two Sons (2013), returned to direct It Takes Two with a development staff of 60 people. After releasing A Way Out, Hazelight decided to create another co-op-only video game, as the studio felt it had become more experienced and could further expand the design concepts introduced in that game. Fares said Hazelight designs its cooperative games from the beginning around two players rather than adding co-op to a single-player structure, and that communication between players was intended to be essential to progression.

The central design theme of It Takes Two was collaboration. Fares said that Hazelight used a guiding word for each of its games: Brothers was about "loss", A Way Out was about "trust", and It Takes Two was about "collaboration". Hazelight worked to connect gameplay with the narrative, with mechanics changing as the story progresses and with Cody and May receiving abilities that reflected their personalities and the themes of each level. Fares pushed the developers to include many different mechanics and set pieces because he believed repeated gameplay mechanics would become "less special". He also said the game was designed to make players continually encounter new situations rather than repeat the same ideas.

Fares described the game as a romantic comedy, saying that the genre was unusual for video games and suited the cooperative premise. The developers drew inspiration from Pixar films, particularly in the game's visual tone and character presentation. Fares provided motion capture for Dr. Hakim. Fares said that the team storyboarded the game's scenes before building much of the gameplay, but that the story and gameplay were adjusted together during production. The actors for Cody and May performed motion capture at Hazelight, and Fares said the actors were allowed to improvise so that the characters could be brought closer to the performers. The game was written mostly in AngelScript, using Hazelight's UnrealEngine-Angelscript integration.

It Takes Two was published under the EA Originals label, allowing Hazelight to retain full creative control while receiving most of the game's profit after development costs were recouped. EA signed a publishing deal with Hazelight in June 2019. The game was officially revealed during EA Play in June 2020. Before the game's release, Take-Two Interactive filed a trademark claim against It Takes Two. Hazelight Studios later abandoned its trademark application for the game's name, while saying it could not comment on ongoing disputes but was "hopeful it will be resolved". EA and Hazelight introduced Friend's Pass, which allows the player who purchased the game to invite a friend to play for free. The game was released for PlayStation 4, PlayStation 5, Windows, Xbox One and Xbox Series X/S on March 26, 2021.

A Nintendo Switch port was developed by Turn Me Up Games and released on November 4, 2022. Turn Me Up producer Louis Polak said that local wireless play required a custom solution because the original game had not been built around the Switch's local wireless system. Executive producer Scott Cromie said the port targeted 720p resolution in handheld mode, 1080p in docked mode, and 30 frames per second. Fares said Hazelight did not focus on Switch during the original production because the studio prioritized the main version of the game, but he praised Turn Me Up's port and said the game reflected his admiration for Nintendo's approach to accessible design.

== Reception ==
It Takes Two sold over 1 million units within one month of release. Sales reached 7 million by mid-2022, and surpassed 20 million by late 2024. By April 2026, it had sold over 30 million copies worldwide.

Reception

Aggregate score
Aggregator	Score
Metacritic	PC: 89/100; PS4: 89/100; PS5: 88/100; XSXS: 89/100; NS: 83/100

Review scores
Publication	Score
Game Informer	9.25/10
GameSpot	9/10
GamesRadar+	5/5
IGN	9/10
Jeuxvideo.com	18/20
PC Gamer (US)	80/100
Shacknews	9/10
Gamer.no	9/10

It Takes Two received "generally favorable" reviews from critics, according to review aggregator Metacritic. Reviewers praised the game's cooperative design, variety of mechanics, and connection between gameplay and story. GameSpot praised its creativity and pacing, saying that the frequent introduction of new ideas kept the experience from feeling stagnant, while IGN described it as an inventive cooperative game whose mechanics evolved throughout the adventure. GamesRadar+ similarly praised its commitment to split-screen play and shared problem-solving, calling it one of the most inventive cooperative platform games in recent years.

Several reviewers highlighted how the game gave Cody and May distinct abilities that required cooperation. Game Informer praised the way the game connected its emotional story to cooperative challenges, while Shacknews commended the variety of gameplay ideas and the way the game encouraged players to work together. Jeuxvideo.com and Gamer.no also praised the game's cooperative structure and variety, with both reviews giving the game high scores.

Other critics also emphasized the game's variety and cooperative structure. The Guardian described it as an engrossing puzzle adventure that used teamwork effectively, while Video Games Chronicle called it an inventive two-player experience with a steady stream of ideas. NME described the game as a Pixar-like cooperative platformer and praised its charm, and Nintendo Life wrote that the later Switch version retained the game's cooperative appeal despite technical compromises.

The game's story and tone received a more mixed response. Reviewers praised the emotional focus on Cody and May's strained marriage, but some criticism was directed at uneven writing and the character of Dr. Hakim. PC Gamer criticized parts of the script and found Dr. Hakim irritating, while still praising the game's imagination and cooperative design.

=== Accolades ===
It Takes Two received several major industry awards and nominations following its release. It won Game of the Year at The Game Awards 2021, Game of the Year at the 25th Annual D.I.C.E. Awards, and Best Multiplayer Game at the Golden Joystick Awards. It also won Better With Friends at The Steam Awards and Excellence in Multiplayer at the SXSW Gaming Awards, and received multiple nominations and two wins at the British Academy Games Awards.

Year	Award	Category	Result	Ref.
2021	Golden Joystick Awards	Ultimate Game of the Year	Nominated	
2021	Golden Joystick Awards	Best Multiplayer Game	Won	
2021	The Steam Awards	Better With Friends	Won	
2021	The Game Awards 2021	Game of the Year	Won	
2021	The Game Awards 2021	Best Family Game	Won	
2021	The Game Awards 2021	Best Game Direction	Nominated	
2021	The Game Awards 2021	Best Multiplayer Game	Won	
2021	The Game Awards 2021	Best Narrative	Nominated	
2021	The Game Awards 2021	Players' Voice	Nominated	
2022	25th Annual D.I.C.E. Awards	Game of the Year	Won	
2022	25th Annual D.I.C.E. Awards	Adventure Game of the Year	Nominated	
2022	25th Annual D.I.C.E. Awards	Outstanding Achievement in Game Direction	Nominated	
2022	25th Annual D.I.C.E. Awards	Outstanding Achievement in Game Design	Won	
2022	25th Annual D.I.C.E. Awards	Outstanding Achievement in Audio Design	Nominated	
2022	25th Annual D.I.C.E. Awards	Outstanding Achievement in Original Music Composition	Nominated	
2022	SXSW Gaming Awards	Game of the Year	Nominated	
2022	SXSW Gaming Awards	Excellence in Multiplayer	Won	
2022	22nd Game Developers Choice Awards	Game of the Year	Nominated	
2022	22nd Game Developers Choice Awards	Best Design	Nominated	
2022	22nd Game Developers Choice Awards	Innovation Award	Nominated	
2022	22nd Game Developers Choice Awards	Best Narrative	Nominated	
2022	22nd Game Developers Choice Awards	Social Impact Award	Nominated	
2022	18th British Academy Games Awards	Best Game	Nominated	
2022	18th British Academy Games Awards	Animation	Nominated	
2022	18th British Academy Games Awards	Artistic Achievement	Nominated	
2022	18th British Academy Games Awards	Game Beyond Entertainment	Nominated	
2022	18th British Academy Games Awards	Game Design	Nominated	
2022	18th British Academy Games Awards	Multiplayer Game	Won	
2022	18th British Academy Games Awards	Narrative	Nominated	
2022	18th British Academy Games Awards	Original Property	Won	
2022	18th British Academy Games Awards	EE Game of the Year	Nominated	

== Adaptations ==
A feature film and television adaptation were announced in January 2022, with both projects in development from Dmitri M. Johnson's dj2 Entertainment. In April 2022, Amazon acquired distribution rights for the film as part of a first-look deal involving Story Kitchen and screenwriters Pat Casey and Josh Miller. The film was planned to follow the premise of the game, with May and Cody transported into dolls of themselves after contemplating divorce. Dwayne Johnson, Dany Garcia, and Hiram Garcia joined the production in producing roles, alongside Dmitri M. Johnson, Michael Lawrence Goldberg, and Timothy I. Stevenson. The project is planned as a joint-venture production between Hazelight Studios, Story Kitchen, Seven Bucks Productions, and Amazon, with an intended release as a Prime Video original film; Johnson was also being courted to star in the film. As of 2025, Fares had expressed frustration with the lack of progress in the film's development.
