= Hazelight Studios =

Video game development company

- Type: Private
- Industry: Video games
- Founded: 2014; 12 years ago
- Founder: Josef Fares
- Headquarters: Stockholm, Sweden
- Key people: Oskar Wolontis (studio manager)
- Products: A Way Out; It Takes Two; Split Fiction
- Number of employees: 81 (2025)
- Website: hazelight.se

Hazelight Studios is a Swedish video game developer based in Stockholm. It was founded by Josef Fares in 2014 who serves as creative director. The company is best known for developing cooperative multiplayer games published by Electronic Arts under the EA Originals label. Their titles include: A Way Out (2018), It Takes Two (2021), and Split Fiction (2025).

== History ==
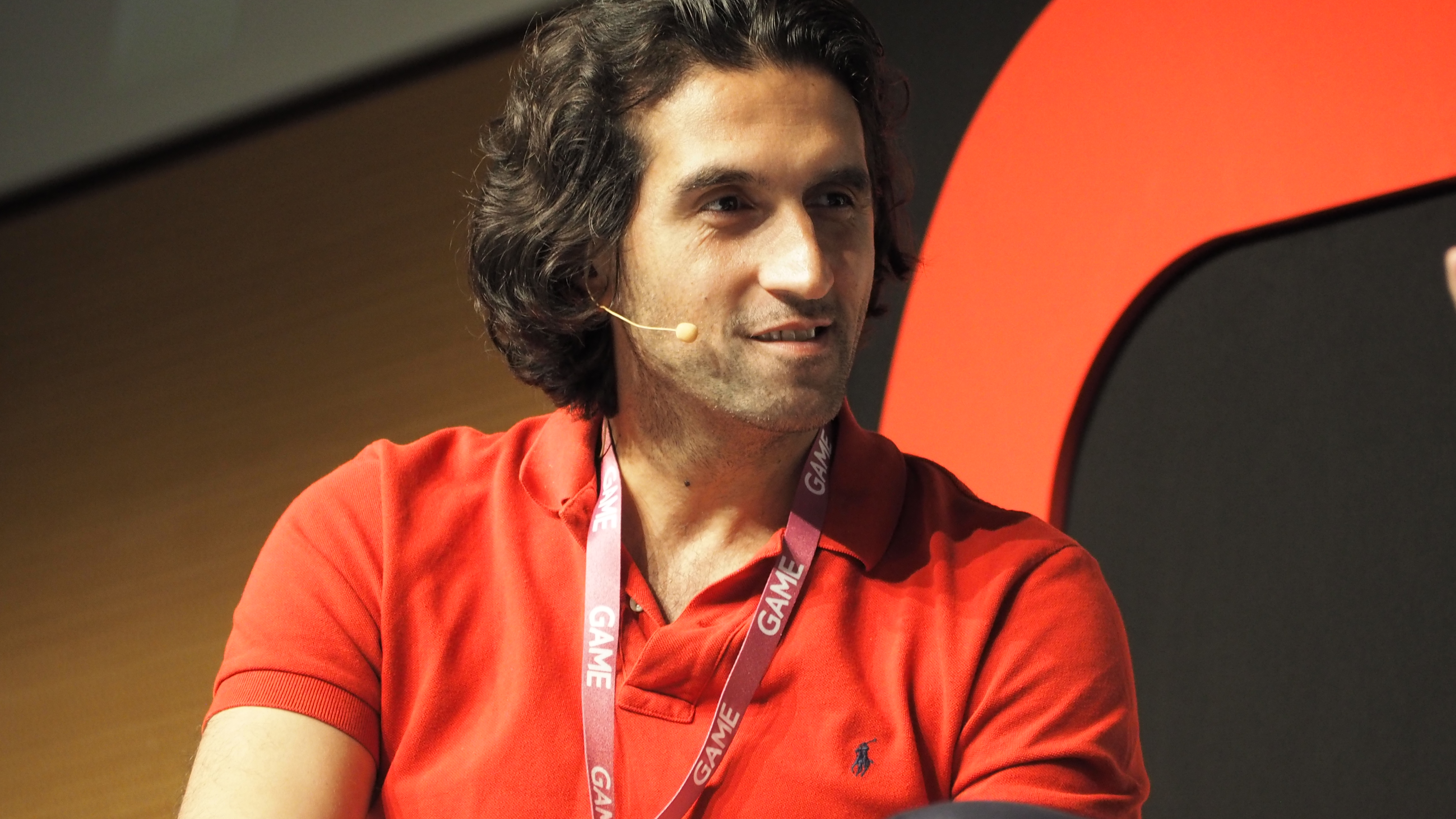
Josef Fares, founder and creative director of the studio

Prior to founding Hazelight, Josef Fares was a film director. His first video game project was Starbreeze Studios' Brothers: A Tale of Two Sons, which received critical acclaim when it was released in 2013. Following the success of Brothers, Fares decided to found a new video game production company based in Stockholm, with the focus of creating a mature, story-focused game. He was joined by the core Brothers development team from Starbreeze, which included Claes Engdal, Emil Claeson, Anders Olsson and Filip Coulianos. The studio was announced at The Game Awards 2014 by publisher Electronic Arts, which also revealed that it would publish the studio's first title. EA allowed Hazelight to share space at DICE so that they could fully focus on creating their game.

The company's first game, A Way Out, was announced by EA at E3 2017. It was part of EA Originals, EA's initiative to support independent games. The program allowed Hazelight to retain full creative control while receiving most of the game's profit after the development cost was recouped. EA gave the team a budget of $3.7 million. The game was released in March 2018 and it received generally positive reviews and sold 1 million copies within 2 weeks. The studio partnered with EA again for its next title, It Takes Two, a co-op platform game released in March 2021. The game won three awards during The Game Awards for Best Family Game, Best Multiplayer Game, and Game of the Year, as well as two awards during the D.I.C.E. Awards for Outstanding Achievement in Game Design and Game of the Year. Following this, it was announced that Hazelight's next game Split Fiction would be released in March 2025, inspired by Fares' daughters and similar to its last game as a co-op platformer with a sci-fi twist.

=== Film adaptations ===
In January 2022, Hazelight announced that it partnered with Dmitri M. Johnson and his company dj2 Entertainment to adapt It Takes Two for television and film. It was then announced in April 2022 that Amazon Studios picked up the project to develop into a film adaptation to be written by Pat Casey and Josh Miller with Dwayne Johnson, Dany Garcia, and Hiram Garcia attached as producers under Seven Bucks Productions.

However, in March 2025, it was announced that a film adaptation of its recent game Split Fiction was in development two week after the game's release, with Story Kitchen (formerly dj2 Entertainment) putting together the film's cast, writers and director. A bidding war took place for rights to the adaptation, with Amazon MGM Studios emerging as the winner in June 2025. By April, Jon M. Chu is attached to direct the adaptation, with a screenplay by Rhett Reese and Paul Wernick, and Sydney Sweeney will star in the film in an undisclosed role and executive produce with Josef Fares in collaboration with Chu's company Electric Somewhere.

== Games ==
| Year | Title | Platform(s) | Publisher |
|---|---|---|---|
| 2018 | A Way Out | PlayStation 4, Windows, Xbox One | Electronic Arts |
| 2021 | It Takes Two | Nintendo Switch, Nintendo Switch 2, PlayStation 4, PlayStation 5, Windows, Xbox One, Xbox Series X/S | Electronic Arts |
| 2025 | Split Fiction | Nintendo Switch 2, PlayStation 5, Windows, Xbox Series X/S | Electronic Arts |
| TBA | Untitled Hazelight Studios game | | Electronic Arts |

== Filmography ==
| Year | Title | Co-producer(s) | Distributor(s) |
|---|---|---|---|
| TBA | It Takes Two | Story Kitchen and Seven Bucks Productions | Amazon MGM Studios |
| TBA | Split Fiction | Story Kitchen and Electric Somewhere | Amazon MGM Studios |
