= Roy Fares =

Swedish pastry chef (born 1984)

Roy Fares Pastry Chef
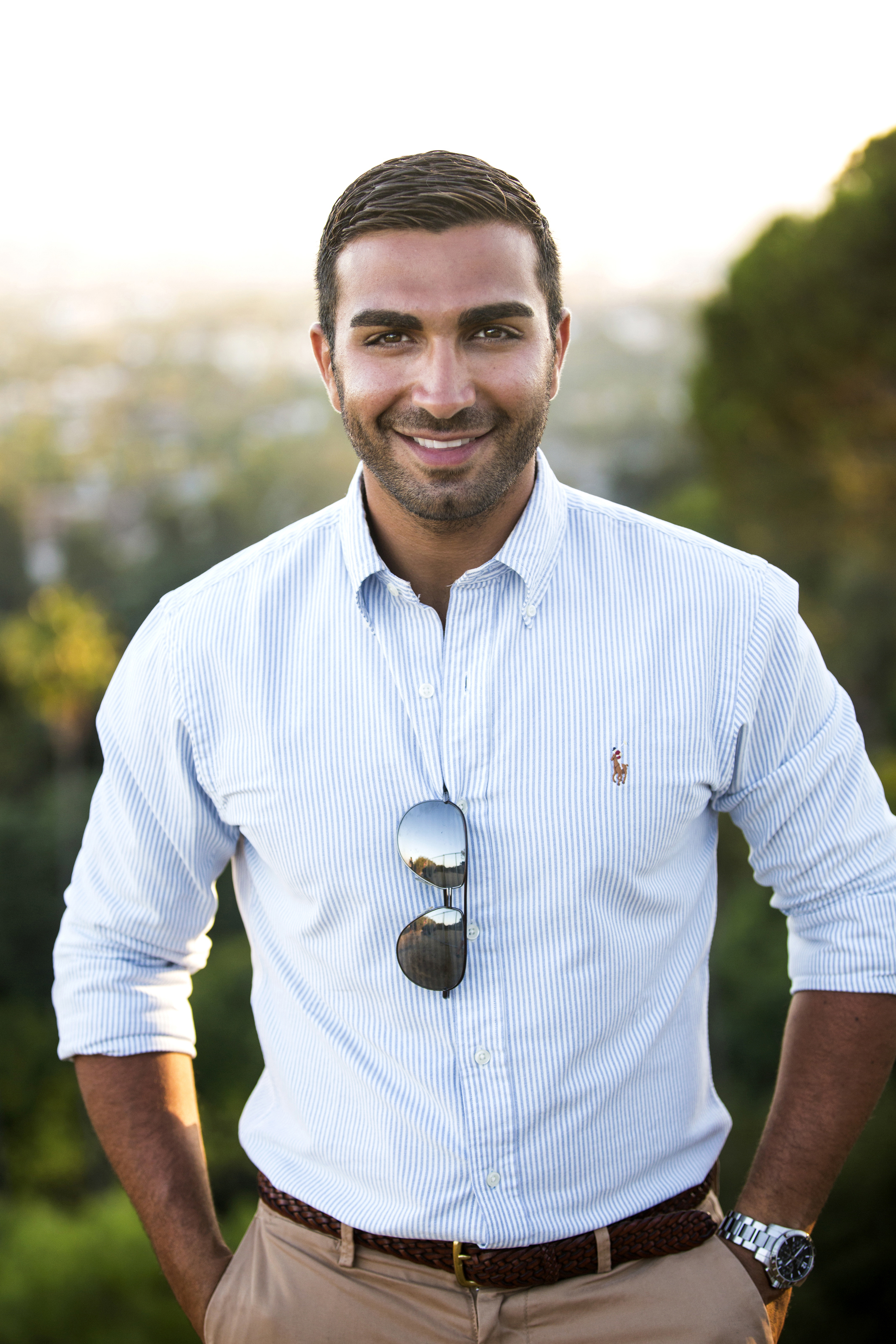
- Fares in 2014
- Born: Roy Fares; 16 September 1984 (age 41); Lebanon
- Notable work: Sweet!; United States of Cakes; Delicious
- Culinary career
- Cooking style: Pastry chef
- Television show: United States of Cakes
- Website: www.byroyfares.se

Roy Fares (born 16 September 1984) is a Lebanese-born Swedish pastry chef, author, and television personality.

== Biography ==
Roy Fares was born in Lebanon. In 1990, he came to Sweden with his family. He grew up in Örebro and now lives in Stockholm. Roy's cousins are Josef Fares and Fares Fares.

Fares attended a three-year high school culinary program in Örebro, with focus on bakery/pastry chef. Roy received his pastry chef apprentice diploma in 2005. In the same year, he won the Swedish Championship for Young Bakers and came third in the European Championship for Young Bakers. After his competition successes, Roy Fares started working at the baker Tössebageriet in Stockholm.

In 2010, Fares won the competition "Årets Konditor" (Pastry Chef of the Year), which is Sweden's largest competition for professional pastry chefs.

In the autumn of 2012, he released his first book, Sweet!, inspired by Swedish, French and American desserts. In 2013, he participated as one of three judges in the TV program Dessertmästarna (The Masters of Desserts) on Kanal 5 and released his second baking book, United States of Cakes. The book was named the World's Best Cookbook 2014 in the category of US cuisine by the Gourmand World Cookbook Awards.

In 2011, Fares also participated as pastry chef in the TV program Go'kväll (Good Evening) on SVT. Since 2013 Fares has been part of TV4's cooking program Mitt Kök (My Kitchen).

In 2014, Fares released his third book, Delicious, an interpretation of the classic baking book Sju Sorters Kakor (Seven Types of Cookies). In April 2015, Fares made his debut as host of Kanal 5's TV series United States of Cakes, based on his book.

In 2014, Fares was named Chicest Man of the Year by the Swedish magazine CHIC.

In 2016, he received the award for the Best Dressed Man of the Year from ELLE Sweden.

== Books ==
- Sweet!, Bonnier Fakta, 2012
- United States of Cakes, Bonnier Fakta, 2013
- Delicious, Bonnier Fakta, 2014

== TV appearances ==
- Go'kväll, Sveriges Television
- Dessertmästarna, Kanal 5
- Mitt Kök, TV4
- United States of Cakes, Kanal 5
