= The Game Awards 2014 =

Video game award ceremony held in Las Vegas

- Date: December 5, 2014
- Venue: The AXIS, Las Vegas, United States
- Country: United States
- Hosted by: Geoff Keighley

Highlights
- Most awards: Destiny; Dragon Age: Inquisition; Mario Kart 8; Valiant Hearts: The Great War; (2)
- Most nominations: Call of Duty: Advanced Warfare; Dark Souls II; Destiny; Hearthstone; Middle-earth: Shadow of Mordor; South Park: The Stick of Truth; (3)
- Game of the Year: Dragon Age: Inquisition
- Industry Icon Award: Ken and Roberta Williams (Sierra Entertainment)
- Website: thegameawards.com
- Viewership: 1.9 million

The Game Awards 2014 ceremony, which honored the best video games of 2014, took place at The AXIS in Las Vegas on December 5, 2014. The show was produced and hosted by Geoff Keighley. The ceremony was the first for The Game Awards, which succeeded the Keighley-hosted Spike Video Game Awards (VGX in 2013) that were discontinued after the 2013 show. Dragon Age: Inquisition won the shows's Game of the Year award.

== Premieres ==
This year's ceremony featured premieres of Nintendo's Super Mario Maker, Code Name: S.T.E.A.M. and The Legend of Zelda: Breath of the Wild, Kojima Productions's Metal Gear Solid V: The Phantom Pain, Visceral Games's Battlefield Hardline, FromSoftware's Bloodborne, Supermassive Games's Until Dawn, Ready at Dawn's The Order: 1886, Crystal Dynamics's Lara Croft and the Temple of Osiris, CD Projekt's The Witcher 3: Wild Hunt; The Odd Gentlemen's King's Quest, Three One Zero's Adrift and Natsume Atari's Godzilla. There were other premieres including Facepunch Studios's Before, Stoic's The Banner Saga 2, Fullbright's Tacoma, Robotoki's Human Element and Hello Games's No Man's Sky.

The broadcast saw a total viewership of about 1.9 million.

== Winners and nominees ==
The nominees for The Game Awards 2014 were announced on November 20, 2014. Candidate games must have a release date of November 25, 2014 or earlier in order to be eligible.

The winners were announced during the awards ceremony on December 5, 2014. Winners are shown first in bold, and indicated with a double-dagger (‡).

=== Jury-voted awards ===
Game of the Year	Developer of the Year
**Dragon Age: Inquisition** – **BioWare**‡; Bayonetta 2 – PlatinumGames; Dark Souls II – FromSoftware; Hearthstone – Blizzard Entertainment; Middle-earth: Shadow of Mordor – Monolith Productions	**Nintendo**‡; Blizzard Entertainment; Monolith Productions; Telltale Games; Ubisoft Montreal
Best Independent Game	Best Mobile/Handheld Game
**Shovel Knight** – **Yacht Club Games**‡; Broken Age Act I – Double Fine Productions; Monument Valley – Ustwo; Transistor – Supergiant Games; The Vanishing of Ethan Carter – The Astronauts	**Hearthstone** – **Blizzard Entertainment**‡; Bravely Default – Silicon Studio and Square Enix; Monument Valley – Ustwo; Super Smash Bros. for Nintendo 3DS – Sora Ltd and Bandai Namco Games; Threes – Sirvo
Best Narrative	Best Score/Soundtrack
**Valiant Hearts: The Great War** – **Ubisoft Montpellier**‡; South Park: The Stick of Truth – Obsidian Entertainment and South Park Digital Studios; The Walking Dead: Season Two – Telltale Games; The Wolf Among Us – Telltale Games; Wolfenstein: The New Order – MachineGames	**Destiny** – **Michael Salvatori, C. Paul Johnson, Martin O'Donnell and Paul McCartney**‡; Alien: Isolation – Byron Bullock, Sam Cooper, Jeff van Dyck, Christian Henson, Joe Henson, Haydn Payne and Alexis Smith; Child of Light – Béatrice Martin; Sunset Overdrive – Boris Salchow; Transistor – Darren Korb
Best Performance	Games for Change
**Trey Parker** **as Various Voices** – **South Park: The Stick of Truth**‡; Adam Harrington as Bigby Wolf – The Wolf Among Us; Kevin Spacey as Jonathan Irons – Call of Duty: Advanced Warfare; Melissa Hutchison as Clementine – The Walking Dead: Season Two; Troy Baker as Talion – Middle-earth: Shadow of Mordor	**Valiant Hearts: The Great War** – **Ubisoft Montpellier**‡; Mountain – David OReilly; Never Alone – Upper One Games and E-Line Media; The Last of Us: Left Behind – Naughty Dog; This War of Mine – 11 bit studios
Best Shooter	Best Action/Adventure
**Far Cry 4** – **Ubisoft Montreal**‡; Call of Duty: Advanced Warfare – Sledgehammer Games; Destiny – Bungie; Titanfall – Respawn Entertainment; Wolfenstein: The New Order – MachineGames	**Middle-earth: Shadow of Mordor** – **Monolith Productions**‡; Assassin's Creed Unity – Ubisoft Montreal; Alien: Isolation – The Creative Assembly; Bayonetta 2 – PlatinumGames; Sunset Overdrive – Insomniac Games
Best Role Playing Game	Best Fighting Game
**Dragon Age: Inquisition** – **BioWare**‡; Bravely Default – Silicon Studio and Square Enix; Dark Souls II – FromSoftware; Divinity: Original Sin – Larian Studios; South Park: The Stick of Truth – Obsidian Entertainment and South Park Digital Studios	**Super Smash Bros. for Wii U** – **Sora Ltd. and Bandai Namco Games**‡; Killer Instinct: Season Two – Double Helix Games, Iron Galaxy Studios, Rare and Microsoft Studios; Persona 4 Arena Ultimax – Arc System Works; Super Smash Bros. for Nintendo 3DS – Sora Ltd. and Bandai Namco Games; Ultra Street Fighter IV – Capcom
Best Family Game	Best Sports/Racing Game
**Mario Kart 8** – **Nintendo EAD**‡; Disney Infinity: Marvel Super Heroes – Avalanche Software; Fantasia: Music Evolved – Harmonix; Skylanders: Trap Team – Toys for Bob and Beenox; Tomodachi Life – Nintendo SPD	**Mario Kart 8** – **Nintendo EAD**‡; FIFA 15 – EA Canada; Forza Horizon 2 – Playground Games, Sumo Digital and Turn 10 Studios; NBA 2K15 – Visual Concepts; Trials Fusion – RedLynx, Ubisoft Shanghai and Ubisoft Kiev
Best Online Experience	Best Remaster
**Destiny** – **Bungie**‡; Call of Duty: Advanced Warfare – Sledgehammer Games, High Moon Studios and Raven Software; Dark Souls II – FromSoftware; Hearthstone – Blizzard Entertainment; Titanfall – Respawn Entertainment	**Grand Theft Auto V** – **by Rockstar North**‡; Halo: The Master Chief Collection – by Bungie and 343 Industries; redeveloped by 343 Industries; Pokémon Omega Ruby and Alpha Sapphire – by Game Freak; The Last of Us Remastered – by Naughty Dog; Tomb Raider: Definitive Edition – originally developed by Crystal Dynamics; redeveloped by Nixxes Software and United Front Games

=== Fan-voted awards ===
Most Anticipated Game	Esports Player of the Year
**The Witcher 3: Wild Hunt** – CD Projekt Red; Batman: Arkham Knight – Rocksteady Studios; Uncharted 4: A Thief's End – Naughty Dog; Evolve – Turtle Rock Studios; Bloodborne – FromSoftware	**Matt "NaDeSHoT" Haag**; Christopher "GeT RiGhT" Alesund; Martin "Rekkles" Larsson; James "Firebat" Kostesich; Xu "Fy" Linsen
Esports Team of the Year	Trending Gamer
**Ninjas in Pyjamas**; Evil Geniuses; Samsung White; Newbee; Edward Gaming	**TotalBiscuit**; VanossGaming; Jeff Gerstmann; PewDiePie; StampyLongHead
Best Fan Creation
**Twitch Plays Pokémon**; Luigi Death Stare – by CZBwoi and Rizupicorr; "It's Dangerous to Go Alone" – by Starbomb; Minecraft - Titan City – by Colonial Puppet; "Mine the Diamond (Minecraft Song)" – by Tobuscus

=== Honorary awards ===
Industry Icon Award
- **Ken and Roberta Williams (Sierra Entertainment)**

== Games with multiple nominations and awards ==
Multiple nominations
Nominations	Game
3	Call of Duty: Advanced Warfare
3	Dark Souls II
3	Destiny
3	Hearthstone
3	Middle-earth: Shadow of Mordor
3	South Park: Stick of Truth
2	Alien: Isolation
2	Bayonetta 2
2	Bravely Default
2	Dragon Age: Inquisition
2	Mario Kart 8
2	Monument Valley
2	Sunset Overdrive
2	Super Smash Bros. for Nintendo 3DS
2	Titanfall
2	Valiant Hearts: The Great War
2	Transistor
2	The Walking Dead: Season 2
2	The Wolf Among Us
2	Wolfenstein: The New Order

Multiple awards
Awards	Game
2	Destiny
2	Dragon Age: Inquisition
2	Mario Kart 8
2	Valiant Hearts: The Great War
