= Rectifier (disambiguation) =

The word rectifier refers to the general act of straightening. It may refer to:

- Rectifier, a device for converting alternating current to direct current
- Rectifier (neural networks), an activation function for artificial neural networks
- Rectifier, a guitar amplifier manufactured by Mesa/Boogie.
- Rectifier, a weapon in the gacha game Wuthering Waves, made by Kuro Games.

== See also ==
- Rectification (disambiguation)
- Rectified spirit
