= The Game Awards 2025 =

Video game awards show

- Date: December 11, 2025
- Venue: Peacock Theater, Los Angeles
- Country: United States
- Hosted by: Geoff Keighley
- Preshow host: Sydnee Goodman

Highlights
- Most awards: Clair Obscur: Expedition 33 (9)
- Most nominations: Clair Obscur: Expedition 33 (13)
- Game of the Year: Clair Obscur: Expedition 33
- Website: thegameawards.com

Online coverage
- Runtime: 3 hours, 7 minutes
- Viewership: 171 million
- Produced by: Geoff Keighley; Kimmie Kim
- Directed by: Richard Preuss

The Game Awards 2025 was an award show to honor the best video games of 2025. It was the twelfth show hosted by Geoff Keighley, creator and producer of the Game Awards, and held with a live audience at the Peacock Theater in Los Angeles on December 11, 2025, and live streamed across online platforms globally. It featured presentations from celebrity guests including David Harbour, Dan Houser, Rahul Kohli, and Lenny Kravitz, and a musical performance from Evanescence.

Clair Obscur: Expedition 33 led the ceremony with thirteen nominations and nine wins, the most in the show's history, including Game of the Year, the first debut game to win this accolade. The Game Changer award honored Girls Make Games, an organization supporting young girls to pursue careers in the video game industry. Several new games were announced, including Control Resonant, Divinity, Mega Man: Dual Override, Tomb Raider: Catalyst, and Star Wars: Fate of the Old Republic. The show was viewed by over 171 million streams, the most in its history, though responses were mixed.

== Background ==
As with previous iterations of the Game Awards, the 2025 show was hosted and produced by Canadian games journalist Geoff Keighley. He returned as an executive producer alongside Kimmie Kim, while Richard Preuss returned as director, LeRoy Bennett as creative director, and Michael E. Peter as co-executive producer. Sydnee Goodman returned as host of the 30-minute preshow, titled Opening Act. The presentation took place at the Peacock Theater in Los Angeles on December 11, 2025. Public tickets became available for purchase on November 1. Keighley dedicated the show to his father, who died in August; an empty seat was reserved in his honor, beside Keighley's mother.

The event was live streamed across online platforms including TikTok, Twitch, Twitter, and YouTube, as well as Amazon Prime Video for the first time. It was broadcast on a record number of platforms in China, including Bilibili, Huya Live, and Weibo. The Game Awards partnered with Amazon for the show, creating a dedicated store for merchandise, deals, and new reveals. The Twitch broadcast was streamed in 1440p for the first time. Like the 2024 show, the Future Class initiative—an annual list of 50 individuals from the industry who best represent its future, introduced in 2020—did not return in 2025, and the list of previous inductees was removed from the show's website.

=== Announcements ===
Keighley sought to balance time dedicated to announcements and awards, wanting to satisfy both sides of the audience; he felt the reveals attracted new viewers and boosted attention to the winners. His team worked directly with developers to prepare trailers and schedule them at specific points in the show to create an emotional arc for viewers. Most of the three-hour show was focused on announcements, with approximately 17 minutes dedicated to awards. According to Kotaku, publishers paid up to US$450,000 for a 60-second trailer and over $1 million for a three-minute slot. Forbes's Paul Tassi reported that Highguard's developer did not pay for its reveal; the show's producers scheduled it as the final trailer.

Preceding the Game Awards, several announcements were made during broadcasts by Wholesome Games on December 9, and Day of the Devs, the Latin American Games Showcase, and the Women-Led Games Showcase on December 10. A statue was placed in the Mojave Desert in late November to tease a reveal at the show, prompting wide speculation; based on trademark registrations, journalists solved that it was a new entry in the Divinity series. The statue was relocated to the Peacock Theater before the ceremony. The Control Resonant and Divinity reveals featured live theatrical elements, including performers on wires; preparation for the former began in March 2025. In addition to new footage from the upcoming films Street Fighter and The Super Mario Galaxy Movie, announcements on released and upcoming games were made for:

- 2XKO
- Arknights: Endfield
- Audiomech: Your Future Transformed
- Battlefield 6
- Diablo IV
- Duet Night Abyss
- Exodus
- Guild Wars 2
- Hitman 3
- Invincible VS
- John Carpenter's Toxic Commando
- Lego Batman: Legacy of the Dark Knight
- Lords of the Fallen
- Lords of the Fallen II
- Marvel Rivals
- Nioh 3
- Phantom Blade Zero
- Phasmophobia
- Pragmata
- Resident Evil Requiem
- Rust Mobile
- Saros
- Screamer
- The Seven Deadly Sins: Origin
- Solasta II
- Solo Leveling: Arise Overdrive
- Soulframe
- Warframe
- Where Winds Meet
- Wuthering Waves
- Zenless Zone Zero

New games announced included:

- 4:Loop
- Ace Combat 8: Wings of Theve
- Bradley the Badger
- Control Resonant
- Coven of the Chicken Foot
- Decrepit
- Divinity
- Forest 3
- The Free Shepherd
- Gang of Dragon
- Highguard
- Mega Man: Dual Override
- No Law
- Ontos
- Orbitals
- Order of the Sinking Star
- Out of Words
- Star Wars: Fate of the Old Republic
- Star Wars: Galactic Racer
- Stupid Never Dies
- Tankrat
- Tomb Raider: Catalyst
- Tomb Raider: Legacy of Atlantis
- Total War: Warhammer 40,000
- Warlock: Dungeons and Dragons

Of the new game announcements, Total War: Warhammer 40,000 received the most followers on Steam with 54,000, roughly the same as the combined total of the next three highest: Tomb Raider: Legacy of Atlantis (20,000), Ace Combat 8: Wings of Theve (18,000), and Control Resonant (16,000). Within a week, the Resident Evil Requiem trailer generated the most media coverage (approximately 1,740 articles, followed by Star Wars: Fate of the Old Republic with 1,605 and Divinity with 1,357) and most social interaction on Facebook and Twitter (followed by Legacy of Atlantis and Ace Combat 8, respectively), while the 2XKO trailer received the most views on YouTube (8 million), followed by Resident Evil Requiem (almost 6.5 million) and Marvel Rivals (5.2 million).

== Winners and nominees ==
Nominees were announced on November 17, 2025; the Game of the Year nominees leaked a few hours before the official announcement. Any game released for public consumption on or before November 21 was eligible for consideration, including downloadable content (DLC), expansions, remakes, remasters, and seasonal content. The nominees were compiled by a jury panel composed of members from 154 media outlets globally—a 14% increase from 2024's 134, particularly from Europe and Latin America. Specialized juries decided nominees for categories like accessibility, adaptation, and esports. Winners were determined between the jury (90 percent) and public voting (10 percent); the latter was held via the official website and Discord server (Note: In China, fan voting was held via platforms such as Bilibili.) until December 10. The exception was the publicly voted Players' Voice, for which voting opened on December 1. Millions of votes were cast within hours, causing website delays, which Keighley called "unprecedented"; 123 million votes were cast overall, a 10% increase from 2024. As with preceding years, a hub world was developed in Fortnite by Nighttimes and Evil Eye Pictures, allowing players and jury members to vote from November 21 for their favorite user-created islands among ten nominees; the winner was announced during the ceremony.

2025 marked the first year in which multiple Game of the Year nominees were independent games, representing a 50/50 split. The six nominees sold a combined 22.3 million copies (Note: The Game of the Year nominees had sold a combined 22.29 million copies by the time of nomination: 5.5 million for Hollow Knight: Silksong; 5.3 million for Clair Obscur: Expedition 33; 3.8 million for Kingdom Come: Deliverance II; 3.49 million for Donkey Kong Bananza; 2.9 million for Hades II; 1.3 million for Death Stranding 2: On the Beach) and each saw sales increases (Note: Each Game of the Year nominee saw sales increases in the month after nominations were announced: 393,000 for Clair Obscur: Expedition 33; 131,000 for Kingdom Come: Deliverance II; 114,000 for Hollow Knight: Silksong; 101,000 for Hades II; 50,000 for Death Stranding 2: On the Beach) after their nominations. Three games—Clair Obscur: Expedition 33, Death Stranding 2: On the Beach, and Ghost of Yōtei—were nominated for all five major craft awards (Best Game Direction, Narrative, Art Direction, Score and Music, and Audio Design), and Expedition 33 was the second game to receive three nominations in a single category (Best Performance) after 2016's Uncharted 4: A Thief's End. Megabonk's Best Debut Indie Game nomination was removed on November 18 at the request of its developer, who felt he did not qualify as it was not his debut game; it was the first time a developer had willingly withdrawn a nomination, and the second rescission overall following the removal of two fangame nominations in 2016. It was subsequently nominated in the 30-game first round of Players' Voice.

The winners were announced during the awards ceremony on December 11, 2025. Clair Obscur: Expedition 33 won all but one of its jury-nominated awards, including Game of the Year and four of the major craft awards; it lost Best Audio Design to Battlefield 6 and the fan-voted Players' Voice to Wuthering Waves. It was the first debut and first French-developed Game of the Year winner, and the first to also be nominated in (and win) the indie game categories. Most of the 30-person development team, Sandfall Interactive, flew from France and bought tickets to attend the show, each dressed in traditional French marinière with red berets. The game's engagement tripled after the show, with its most successful sales day since May and most cumulative Steam players (57,000) since June; more than 300,000 copies were sold in the following five days. The game saw a 160% weekly increase in players on December 13, of whom 17% were new. Of the other winners, South of Midnight and No Man's Sky saw a 32% and 14% increase in daily active users on the following weekend.

Baldur's Gate 3's Best Community Support win was its eighth award overall (briefly breaking the show's overall record before Expedition 33's ninth win) and its third consecutive year at the show (following its six wins in 2023 and one in 2024). Nintendo won two awards, totaling 24 at the Game Awards overall, while Final Fantasy Tactics: The Ivalice Chronicles's win marked Square Enix's twelfth and Final Fantasy's tenth overall. id Software and Supergiant Games received their third awards with Doom: The Dark Ages and Hades II, having won two each with Doom and Hades in 2016 and 2020, respectively. Several studios received their first award, including Compulsion Games for South of Midnight (its first nomination), Team Cherry for Hollow Knight: Silksong, KOF Studio and SNK for Fatal Fury: City of the Wolves, and Kuro Games for Wuthering Waves. No Man's Sky won Best Ongoing Game for the second time, having done so in 2020. Grand Theft Auto VI is the second game to win Most Anticipated Game twice consecutively, after Elden Ring in 2020 and 2021, and The Last of Us is the first two-time Best Adaptation winner, having won for its first season in 2023.

=== Awards ===
Winners are listed first, highlighted in boldface, and indicated with a double dagger (‡).

==== Media ====
Clair Obscur: Expedition 33 award acceptees

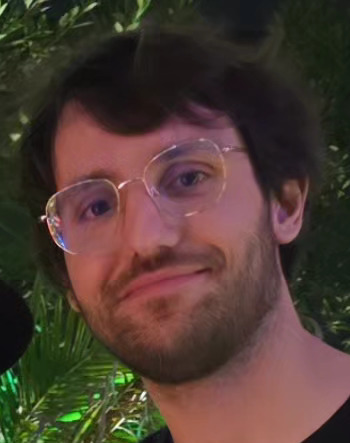
Guillaume Broche (Game of the Year, Best Game Direction, Best Narrative)

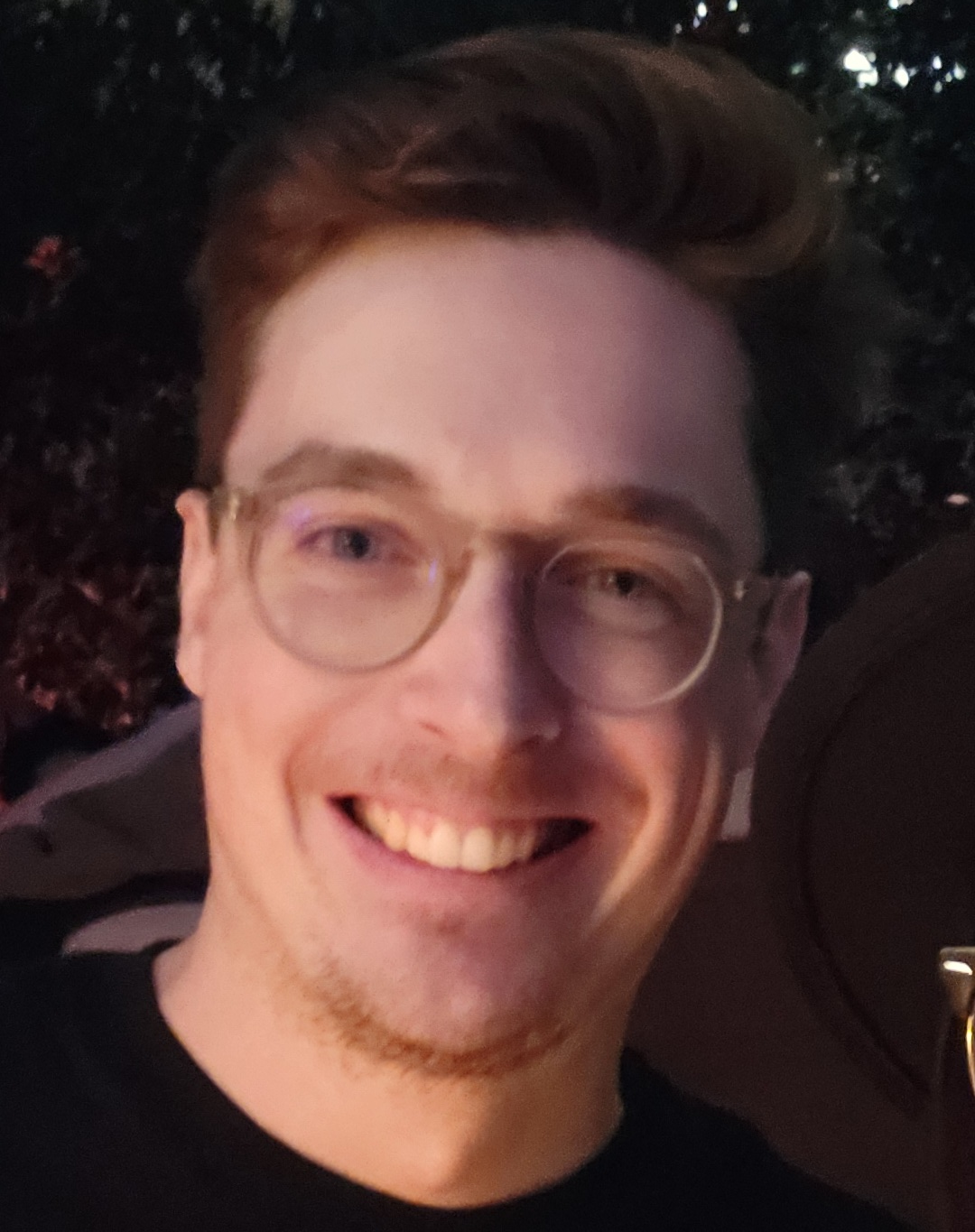
Nicholas Maxson-Francombe (Game of the Year, Best Game Direction)

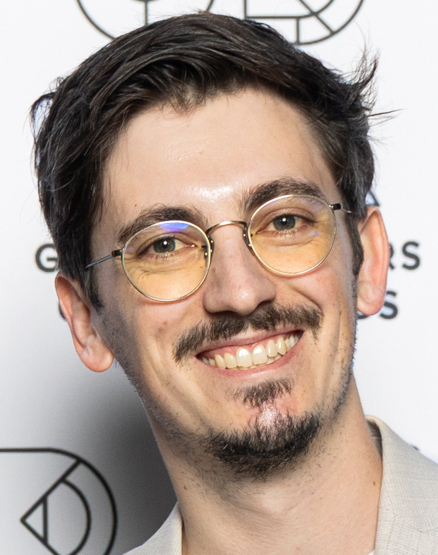
Tom Guillermin (Game of the Year, Best Independent Game)

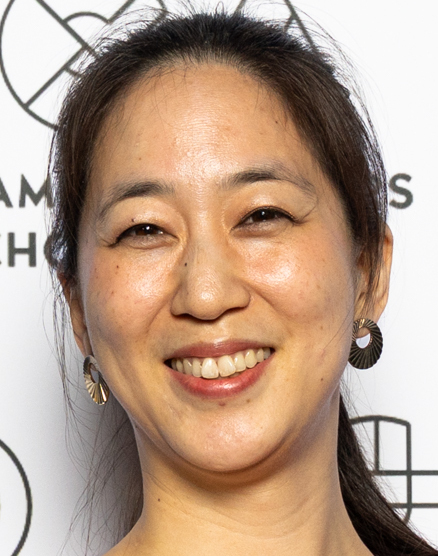
Jennifer Svedberg-Yen (Best Narrative)

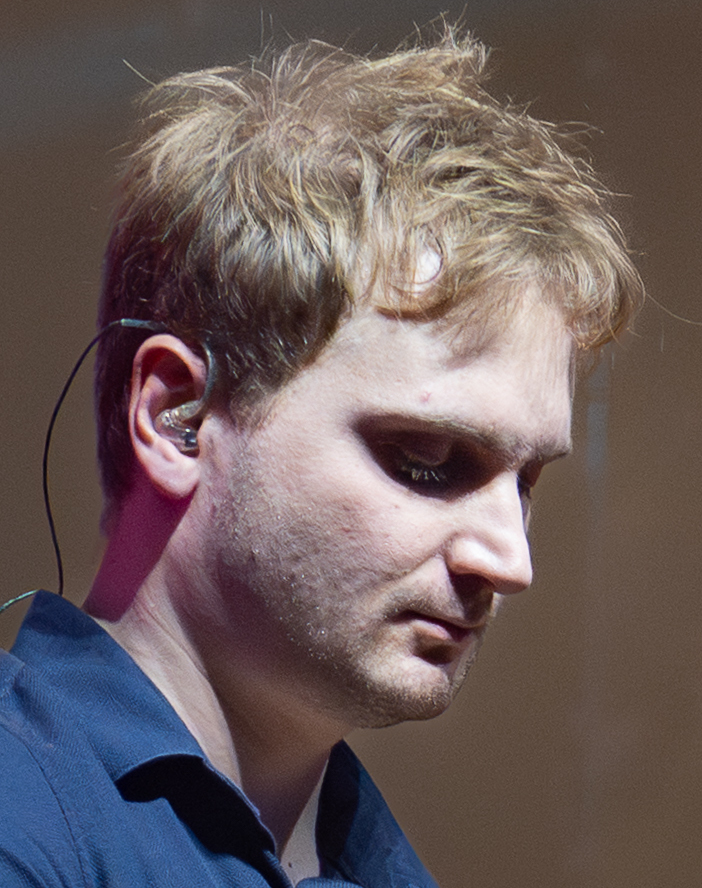
Lorien Testard (Best Score and Music)

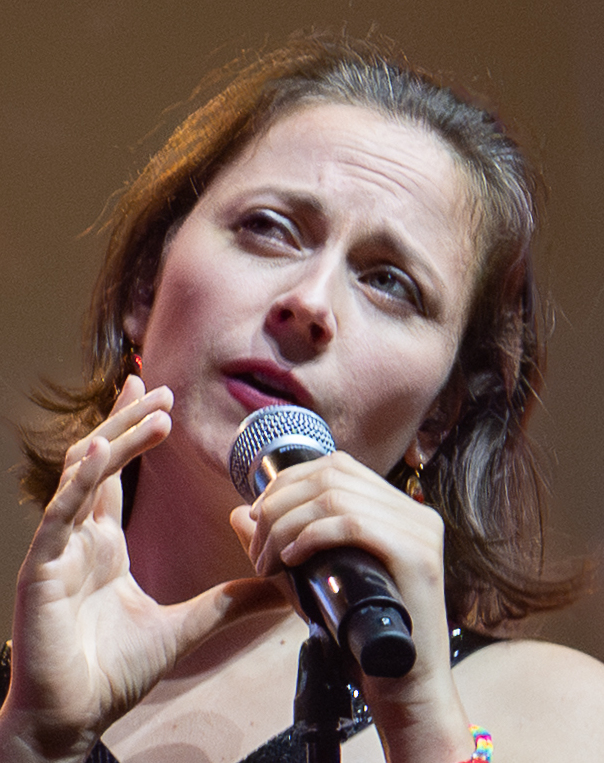
Alice Duport-Percier (Best Score and Music)

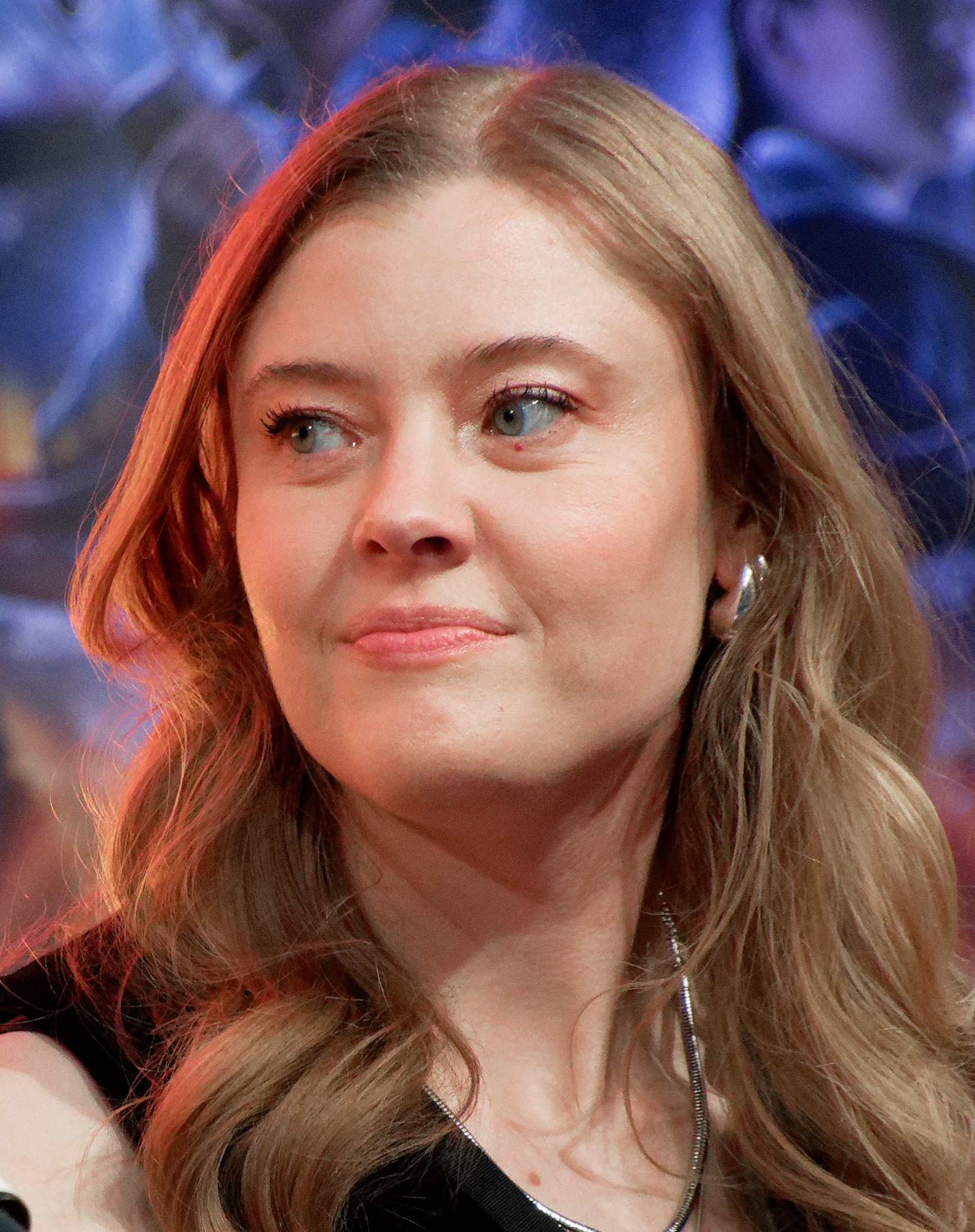
Jennifer English (Best Performance as Maelle)

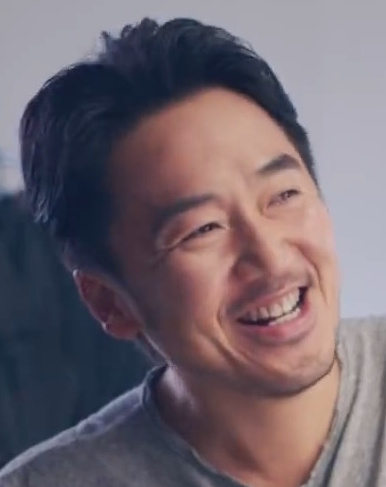
Motohiro Okubo accepted Best Mobile Game for Umamusume: Pretty Derby.

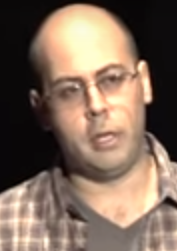
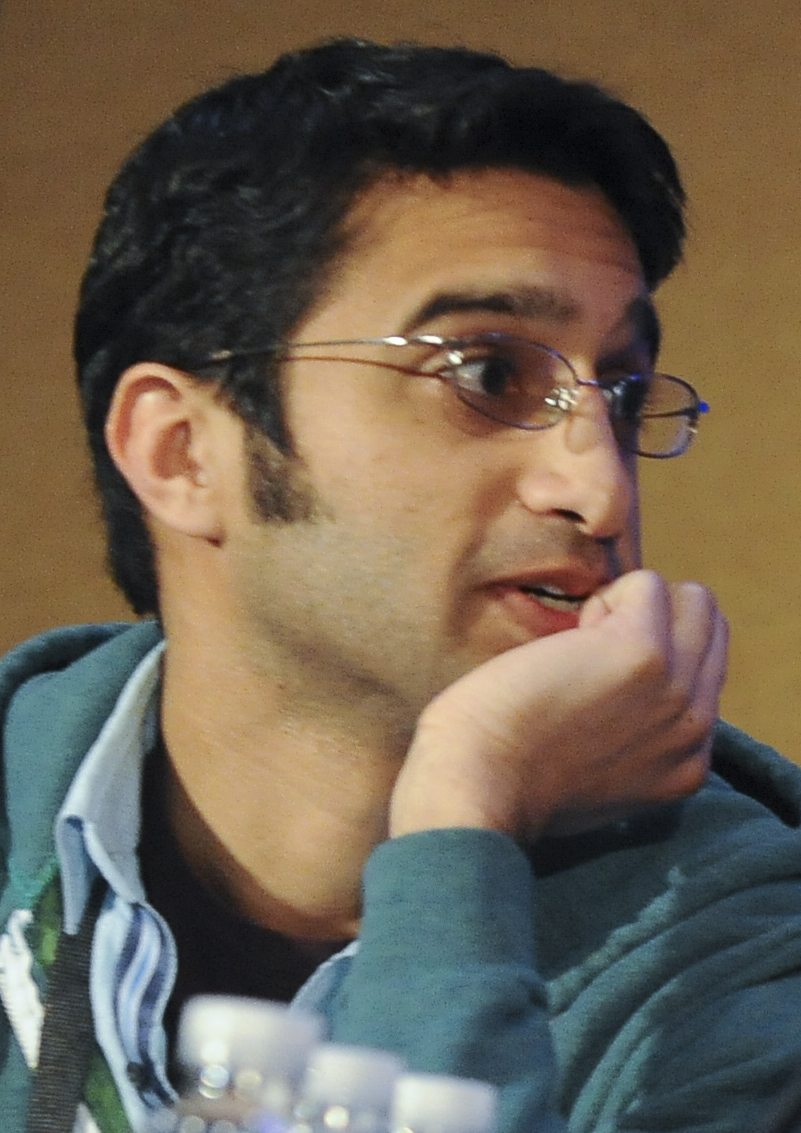
Greg Kasavin (top) and Amir Rao (bottom) accepted Best Action Game for Hades II.

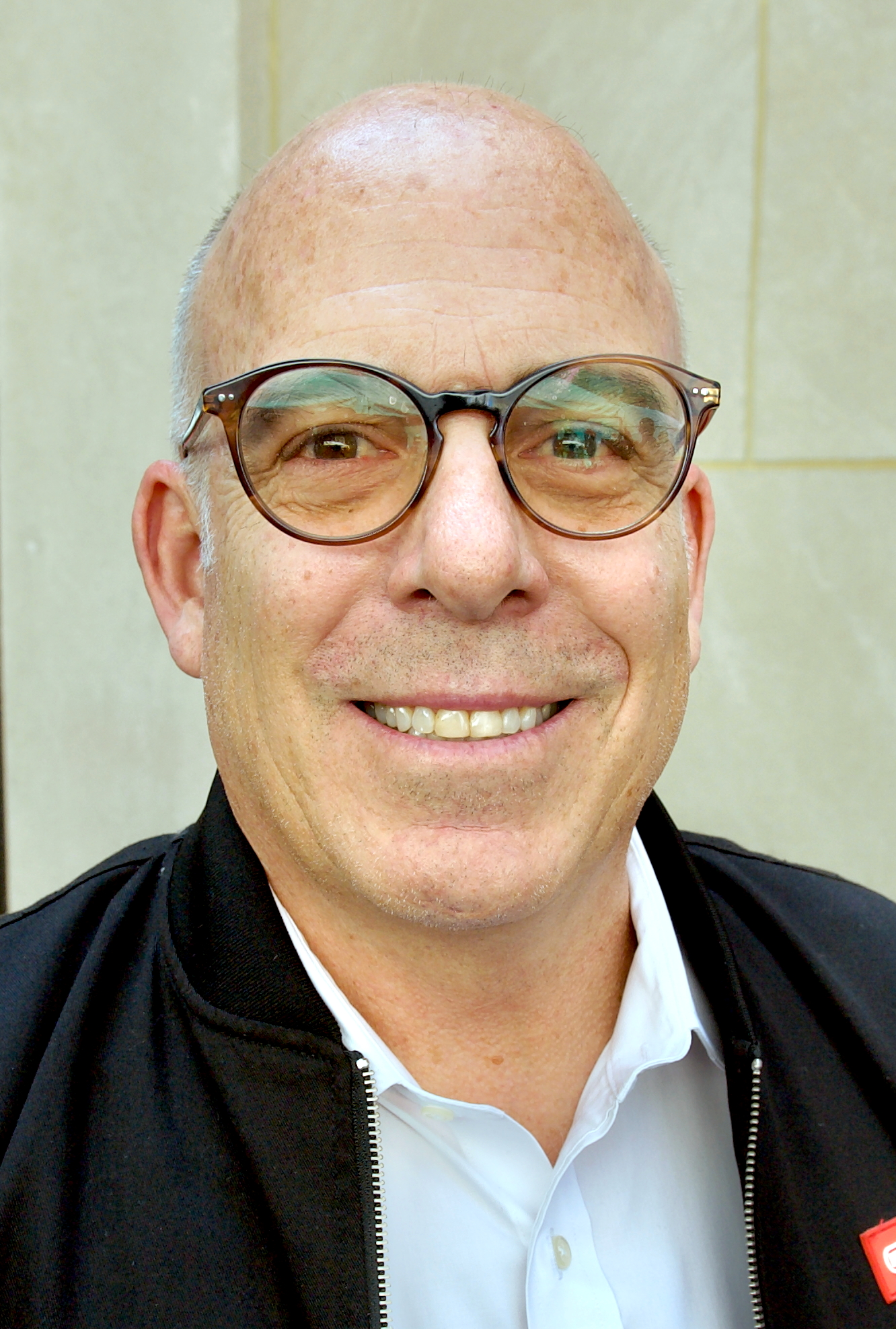
Doug Bowser accepted Best Family Game for Donkey Kong Bananza.

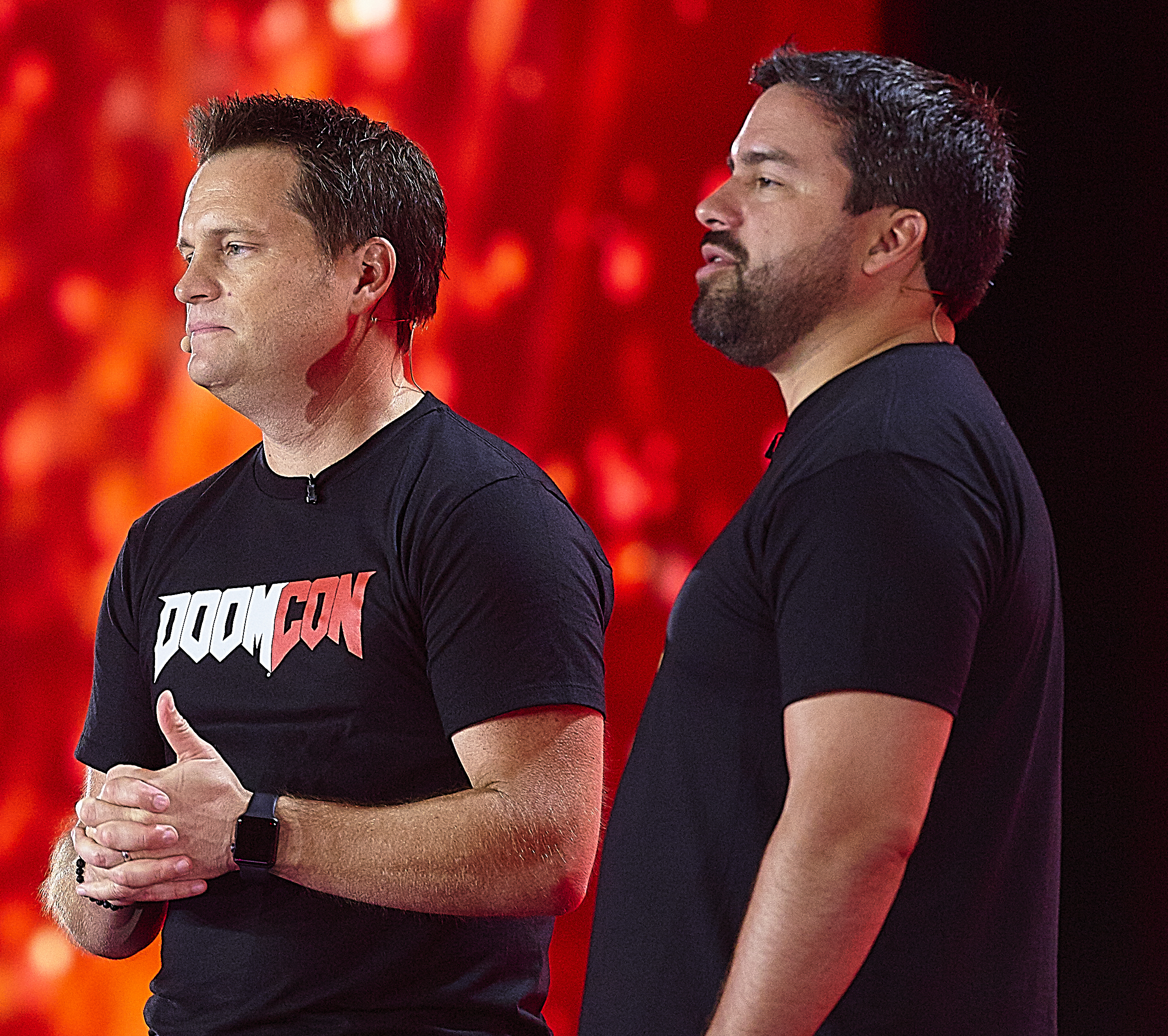
Marty Stratton (left) and Hugo Martin (right) accepted Innovation in Accessibility for Doom: The Dark Ages.

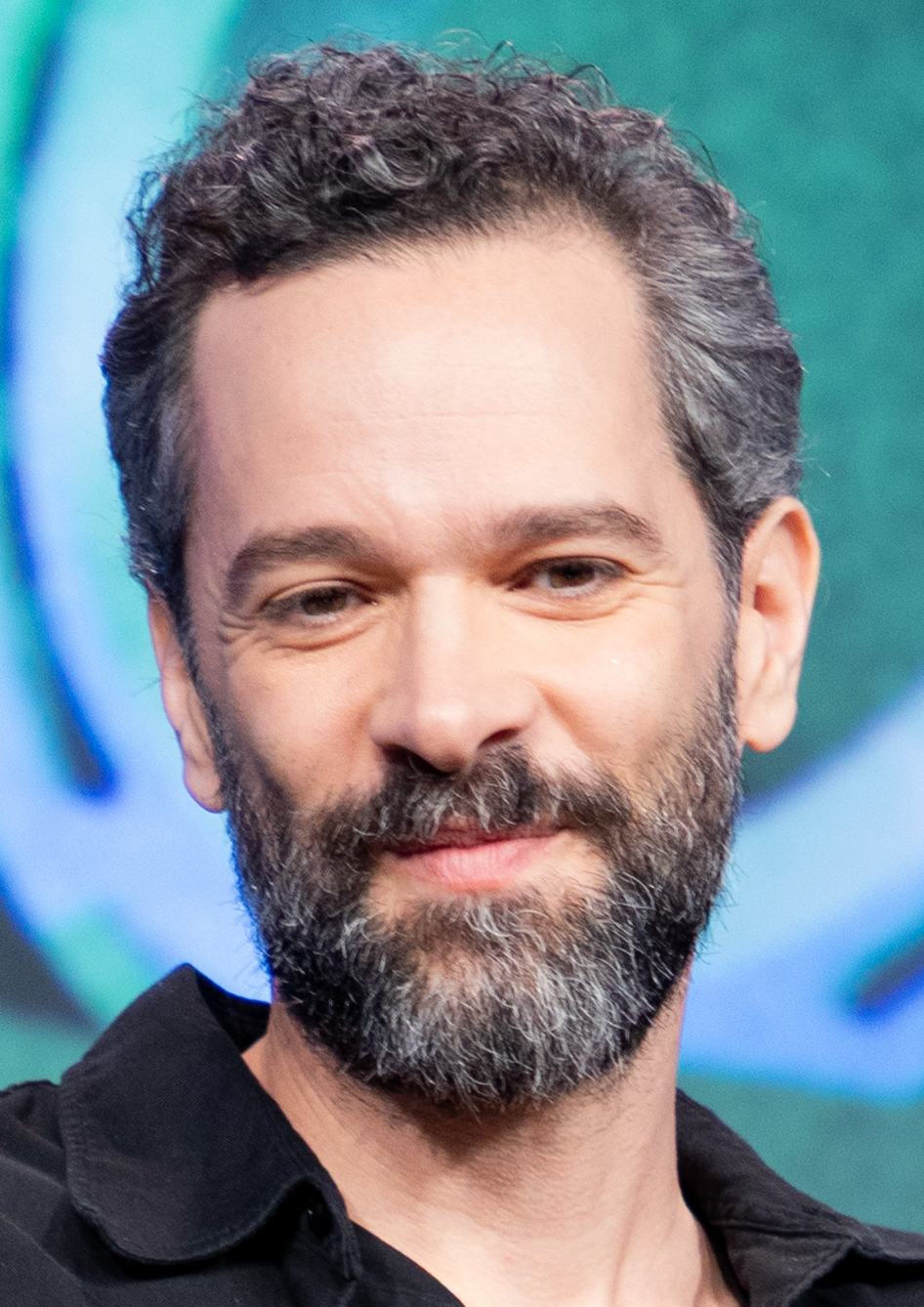
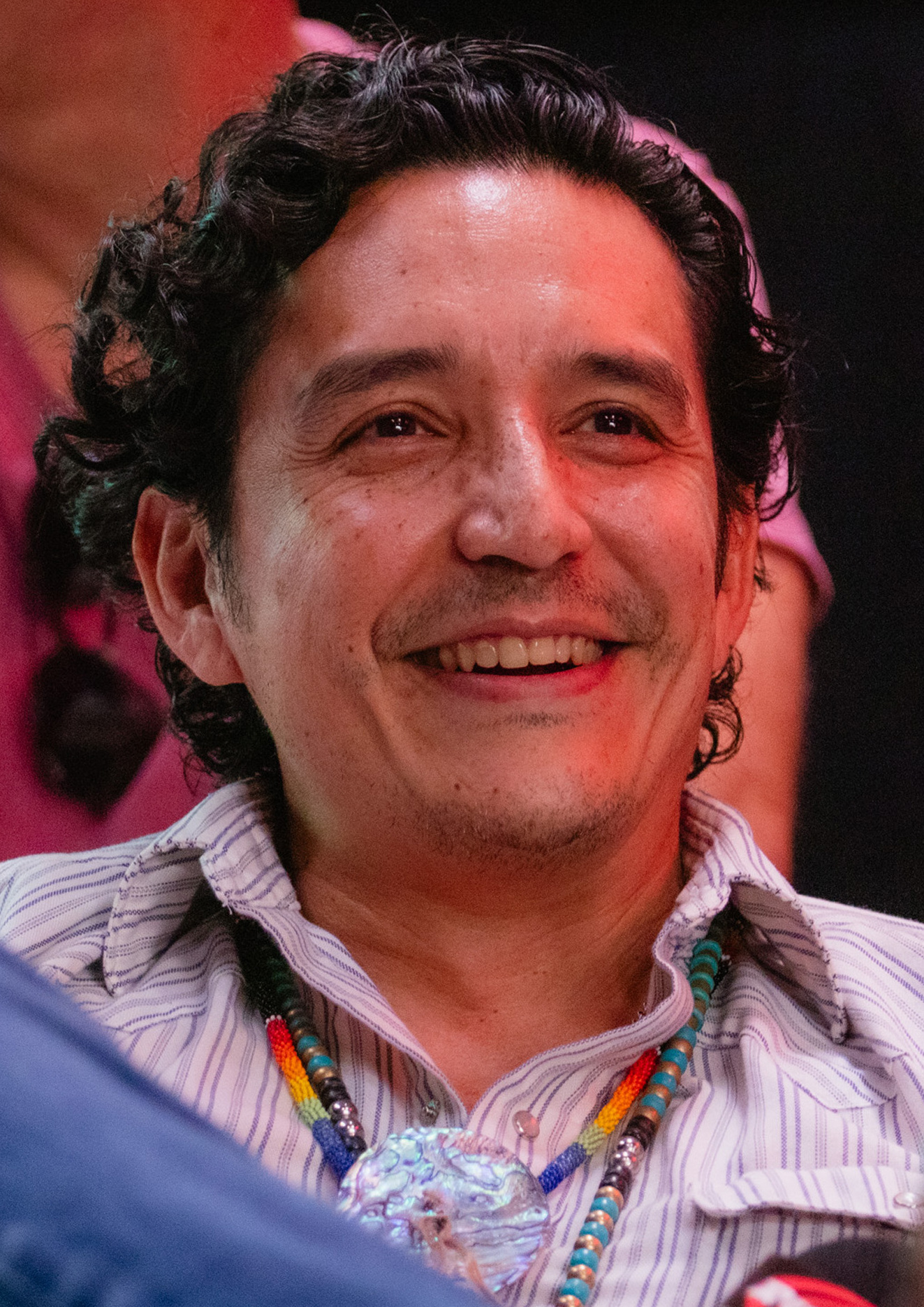
Neil Druckmann (left) and Gabriel Luna (right) accepted Best Adaptation for The Last of Us's second season.

Game of the Year	Best Game Direction
**Clair Obscur: Expedition 33 – Sandfall Interactive / Kepler Interactive**‡; Death Stranding 2: On the Beach – Kojima Productions / Sony Interactive Entertainment; Donkey Kong Bananza – Nintendo EPD / Nintendo; Hades II – Supergiant Games; Hollow Knight: Silksong – Team Cherry; Kingdom Come: Deliverance II – Warhorse Studios / Deep Silver	**Clair Obscur: Expedition 33 – Sandfall Interactive / Kepler Interactive**‡; Death Stranding 2: On the Beach – Kojima Productions / Sony Interactive Entertainment; Ghost of Yōtei – Sucker Punch Productions / Sony Interactive Entertainment; Hades II – Supergiant Games; Split Fiction – Hazelight Studios / Electronic Arts
Best Narrative	Best Art Direction
**Clair Obscur: Expedition 33 – Sandfall Interactive / Kepler Interactive**‡; Death Stranding 2: On the Beach – Kojima Productions / Sony Interactive Entertainment; Ghost of Yōtei – Sucker Punch Productions / Sony Interactive Entertainment; Kingdom Come: Deliverance II – Warhorse Studios / Deep Silver; Silent Hill f – NeoBards Entertainment / Konami Digital Entertainment	**Clair Obscur: Expedition 33 – Sandfall Interactive / Kepler Interactive**‡; Death Stranding 2: On the Beach – Kojima Productions / Sony Interactive Entertainment; Ghost of Yōtei – Sucker Punch Productions / Sony Interactive Entertainment; Hades II – Supergiant Games; Hollow Knight: Silksong – Team Cherry
Best Score and Music (Note: Presented in conjunction with Spotify)	Best Audio Design
**Clair Obscur: Expedition 33 – Lorien Testard**‡; Death Stranding 2: On the Beach – Woodkid and Ludvig Forssell; Ghost of Yōtei – Toma Otowa; Hades II – Darren Korb; Hollow Knight: Silksong – Christopher Larkin	**Battlefield 6 – Battlefield Studios / Electronic Arts**‡; Clair Obscur: Expedition 33 – Sandfall Interactive / Kepler Interactive; Death Stranding 2: On the Beach – Kojima Productions / Sony Interactive Entertainment; Ghost of Yōtei – Sucker Punch Productions / Sony Interactive Entertainment; Silent Hill f – NeoBards Entertainment / Konami Digital Entertainment
Best Performance	Games for Impact
**Jennifer English as Maelle – Clair Obscur: Expedition 33**‡; Troy Baker as Indiana Jones – Indiana Jones and the Great Circle; Charlie Cox as Gustave – Clair Obscur: Expedition 33; Erika Ishii as Atsu – Ghost of Yōtei; Konatsu Kato as Hinako Shimizu – Silent Hill f; Ben Starr as Verso – Clair Obscur: Expedition 33	**South of Midnight – Compulsion Games / Xbox Game Studios**‡; Consume Me – Jenny Jiao Hsia, AP Thomson / Hexacutable; Despelote – Julián Cordero, Sebastián Valbuena / Panic; Lost Records: Bloom & Rage – Don't Nod; Wanderstop – Ivy Road / Annapurna Interactive
Best Independent Game	Best Debut Indie Game
**Clair Obscur: Expedition 33 – Sandfall Interactive / Kepler Interactive**‡; Absolum – Guard Crush Games, Supamonks / Dotemu; Ball x Pit – Kenny Sun / Devolver Digital; Blue Prince – Dogubomb / Raw Fury; Hades II – Supergiant Games; Hollow Knight: Silksong – Team Cherry	**Clair Obscur: Expedition 33 – Sandfall Interactive / Kepler Interactive**‡; Blue Prince – Dogubomb / Raw Fury; Despelote – Julián Cordero, Sebastián Valbuena / Panic; Dispatch – AdHoc Studio; ~~Megabonk – Vedinad~~ (Note: Nomination rescinded at the developer's request)
Best Ongoing Game	Best Community Support
**No Man's Sky – Hello Games**‡; Final Fantasy XIV – Square Enix; Fortnite – Epic Games; Helldivers II – Arrowhead Game Studios / Sony Interactive Entertainment; Marvel Rivals – NetEase Games	**Baldur's Gate 3 – Larian Studios**‡; Final Fantasy XIV: Dawntrail – Square Enix; Fortnite – Epic Games; Helldivers II – Arrowhead Game Studios / Sony Interactive Entertainment; No Man's Sky – Hello Games
Best Mobile Game	Best VR / AR Game
**Umamusume: Pretty Derby – Cygames**‡; Destiny: Rising – NetEase Games; Persona 5: The Phantom X – Black Wings Game Studio / Sega; Sonic Rumble – Rovio Entertainment, Sonic Team / Sega; Wuthering Waves – Kuro Games	**The Midnight Walk – MoonHood / Fast Travel Games**‡; Alien: Rogue Incursion – Survios; Arken Age – VitruviusVR; Ghost Town – Fireproof Games; Marvel's Deadpool VR – Twisted Pixel Games / Oculus Studios
Best Action Game	Best Action / Adventure Game
**Hades II – Supergiant Games**‡; Battlefield 6 – Battlefield Studios / Electronic Arts; Doom: The Dark Ages – id Software / Bethesda Softworks; Ninja Gaiden 4 – Team Ninja, PlatinumGames / Xbox Game Studios; Shinobi: Art of Vengeance – Lizardcube / Sega	**Hollow Knight: Silksong – Team Cherry**‡; Death Stranding 2: On the Beach – Kojima Productions / Sony Interactive Entertainment; Ghost of Yōtei – Sucker Punch Productions / Sony Interactive Entertainment; Indiana Jones and the Great Circle – MachineGames / Bethesda Softworks; Split Fiction – Hazelight Studios / Electronic Arts
Best Role Playing Game	Best Fighting Game
**Clair Obscur: Expedition 33 – Sandfall Interactive / Kepler Interactive**‡; Avowed – Obsidian Entertainment / Xbox Game Studios; Kingdom Come: Deliverance II – Warhorse Studios / Deep Silver; Monster Hunter Wilds – Capcom; The Outer Worlds 2 – Obsidian Entertainment / Xbox Game Studios	**Fatal Fury: City of the Wolves – KOF Studio / SNK**‡; 2XKO – Riot Games; Capcom Fighting Collection 2 – Capcom; Mortal Kombat: Legacy Kollection – Digital Eclipse / Atari; Virtua Fighter 5 R.E.V.O. World Stage – Ryu Ga Gotoku Studio / Sega
Best Family Game	Best Sim / Strategy Game
**Donkey Kong Bananza – Nintendo EPD / Nintendo**‡; Lego Party – SMG Studio / Fictions; Lego Voyagers – Light Brick Studio / Annapurna Interactive; Mario Kart World – Nintendo EPD / Nintendo; Sonic Racing: CrossWorlds – Sonic Team / Sega; Split Fiction – Hazelight Studios / Electronic Arts	**Final Fantasy Tactics: The Ivalice Chronicles – Square Enix**‡; The Alters – 11 Bit Studios; Civilization VII – Firaxis Games / 2K; Jurassic World Evolution 3 – Frontier Developments; Tempest Rising – Slipgate Ironworks / 3D Realms; Two Point Museum – Two Point Studios / Sega
Best Sports / Racing Game	Best Multiplayer Game
**Mario Kart World – Nintendo EPD / Nintendo**‡; EA Sports FC 26 – EA Vancouver, EA Romania / Electronic Arts; F1 25 – Codemasters / EA Sports; Rematch – Sloclap / Kepler Interactive; Sonic Racing: CrossWorlds – Sonic Team / Sega	**ARC Raiders – Embark Studios**‡; Battlefield 6 – Battlefield Studios / Electronic Arts; Elden Ring Nightreign – FromSoftware / Bandai Namco Entertainment; Peak – Aggro Crab / Landfall Games; Split Fiction – Hazelight Studios / Electronic Arts
Innovation in Accessibility	Best Adaptation (Note: Awarded to media based on video games)
**Doom: The Dark Ages – id Software / Bethesda Softworks**‡; Assassin's Creed Shadows – Ubisoft Quebec / Ubisoft; Atomfall – Rebellion Developments; EA Sports FC 26 – EA Vancouver, EA Romania / Electronic Arts; South of Midnight – Compulsion Games / Xbox Game Studios	**The Last of Us season 2 (television series) – PlayStation Productions / HBO; based on The Last of Us by Sony Interactive Entertainment**‡; A Minecraft Movie (feature film) – Legendary Pictures, Mojang / Warner Bros. Pictures; based on Minecraft by Mojang Studios; Devil May Cry (animated series) – Studio Mir, Capcom / Netflix; based on Devil May Cry by Capcom; Splinter Cell: Deathwatch (animated series) – FOST Studio, Ubisoft / Netflix; based on Tom Clancy's Splinter Cell by Ubisoft; Until Dawn (feature film) – PlayStation Productions / Screen Gems; based on Until Dawn by PlayStation Studios
Most Anticipated Game	Players' Voice (Note: 100 percent public-voted award with a three-round nomination process that began with 30 games)
**Grand Theft Auto VI – Rockstar Games**‡; 007 First Light – IO Interactive; Marvel's Wolverine – Insomniac Games / Sony Interactive Entertainment; Resident Evil Requiem – Capcom; The Witcher IV – CD Projekt Red / CD Projekt	**Wuthering Waves – Kuro Games**‡; Clair Obscur: Expedition 33 – Sandfall Interactive / Kepler Interactive; Dispatch – AdHoc Studio; Genshin Impact – miHoYo / HoYoverse; Hollow Knight: Silksong – Team Cherry

==== Esports and creators ====
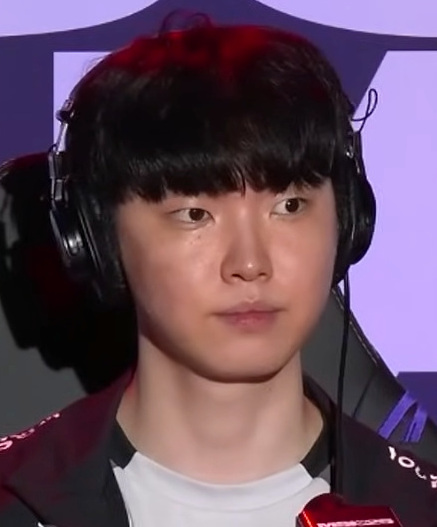
Jung "Chovy" Ji-hoon won Best Esports Athlete.

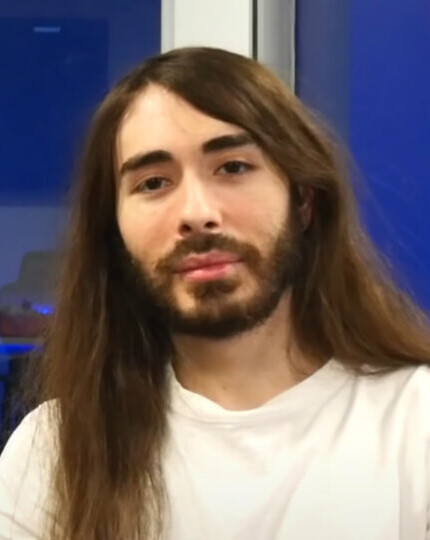
MoistCr1TiKaL won Content Creator of the Year.

Best Esports Game (Note: Presented in conjunction with Gain)	Best Esports Athlete
**Counter-Strike 2 – Valve**‡; Dota 2 – Valve; League of Legends – Riot Games; Mobile Legends: Bang Bang – Moonton; Valorant – Riot Games	**Jung "Chovy" Ji-hoon (League of Legends)**‡; Brock "brawk" Somerhalder (Valorant); Jason "f0rsakeN" Susanto (Valorant); Kakeru "Kakeru" Watanabe (Street Fighter); Saul "MenaRD" Leonardo (Street Fighter); Mathieu "ZywOo" Herbaut (Counter-Strike 2)
Best Esports Team	Content Creator of the Year
**Team Vitality (Counter-Strike 2)**‡; Gen.G (League of Legends); NRG (Valorant); Team Liquid PH (Mobile Legends: Bang Bang); Team Falcons (Dota 2)	**MoistCr1TiKaL**‡; Caedrel; Kai Cenat; Sakura Miko; TheBurntPeanut

==== Honorary award ====
The Game Changer award was given to the organization Girls Make Games, which supports girls to pursue careers in the video game industry. The award was accepted by Ellie Freeman and Monica Paredes.

=== Multiple nominations and awards ===
==== Multiple nominations ====
Clair Obscur: Expedition 33 received 13 nominations, the most in the show's history. Other games with multiple nominations included Death Stranding 2: On the Beach and Ghost of Yōtei with seven, and Hades II and Hollow Knight: Silksong with six. Sony Interactive Entertainment had 19 nominations, more than any other publisher, followed by Kepler Interactive with 14 and Electronic Arts with 10. Microsoft Gaming's subsidiary companies—Bethesda Game Studios and Xbox Game Studios—received a combined nine nominations. Netflix and PlayStation Productions both received two nominations for their television series in Best Adaptation.

Games that received multiple nominations
Nominations	Game
13	Clair Obscur: Expedition 33
7	Death Stranding 2: On the Beach
7	Ghost of Yōtei
6	Hades II
6	Hollow Knight: Silksong
4	Split Fiction
3	Battlefield 6
3	Kingdom Come: Deliverance II
3	Silent Hill f
2	Blue Prince
2	Despelote
2	Dispatch
2	Donkey Kong Bananza
2	Doom: The Dark Ages
2	EA Sports FC 26
2	Final Fantasy XIV
2	Fortnite
2	Helldivers II
2	Indiana Jones and the Great Circle
2	Mario Kart World
2	No Man's Sky
2	Sonic Racing: CrossWorlds
2	South of Midnight
2	Wuthering Waves

Nominations by publisher
Nominations	Publisher
19	Sony Interactive Entertainment
14	Kepler Interactive
10	Electronic Arts
7	Sega
6	Supergiant Games
6	Team Cherry
5	Xbox Game Studios
4	Bethesda Softworks
4	Nintendo
3	Capcom (Note: Capcom received an additional nomination as co-producer of Devil May Cry for Best Adaptation.)
3	Deep Silver
3	Konami Digital Entertainment
3	Riot Games
3	Square Enix
2	AdHoc Studio
2	Annapurna Interactive
2	Epic Games
2	Hello Games
2	Kuro Games
2	NetEase Games
2	Panic
2	Raw Fury
2	Valve
1	Ubisoft (Note: Ubisoft received an additional nomination as co-producer of Splinter Cell: Deathwatch for Best Adaptation.)

==== Multiple awards ====
Clair Obscur: Expedition 33 and its publisher Kepler Interactive led the show with nine wins, the most in the show's history. It was the only game to win multiple awards at the ceremony. Nintendo was the only other publisher to win multiple awards, receiving two (one each for Donkey Kong Bananza and Mario Kart World), while Microsoft Gaming's subsidiary companies received two awards (one each for Bethesda's Doom: The Dark Ages and Xbox Game Studios's South of Midnight). While Sony Interactive Entertainment led the nominees with 19 nods, it ultimately won no awards.

Games that received multiple wins
Awards	Game
9	Clair Obscur: Expedition 33

Wins by publisher
Awards	Publisher
9	Kepler Interactive
2	Nintendo

== Presenters and performers ==
=== Presenters ===
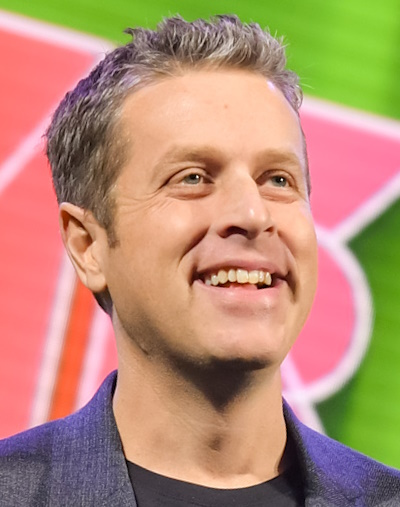
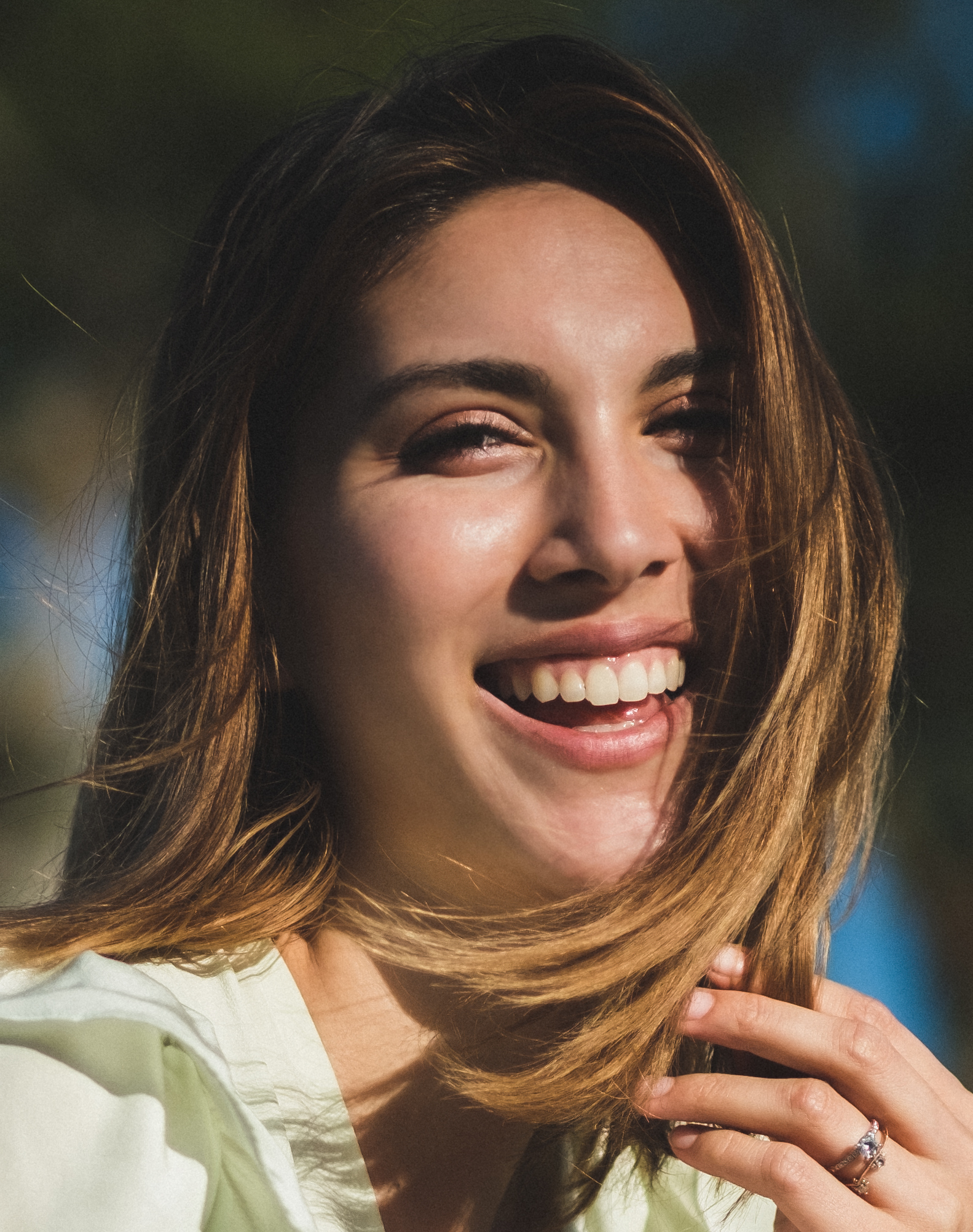
Geoff Keighley (top) hosted the main show while Sydnee Goodman (bottom) hosted the preshow.

Cast members from the second season of Fallout were set to present at the ceremony as part of the Game Awards's new partnership with distributor Amazon. The following individuals, listed in order of appearance, presented awards or introduced trailers. All other awards were presented by Keighley or Goodman.

Name	Role
Elijah Wright	Presented the award for Best Action Game
Jeffrey Wright	Presented the award for Best Action Game
Neil Newbon	Presented the award for Best Performance
Maggie Robertson	Presented the award for Best Performance
J. J. Abrams	Introduced the reveal trailer for 4:Loop
Mike Booth	Introduced the reveal trailer for 4:Loop
Jenova Chen	Presented the award for Games for Impact
Tricia Helfer	Introduced the reveal trailer for Warlock: Dungeons and Dragons
Joe "Roman Reigns" Anoa'i	Followed the teaser for Street Fighter and presented Best Ongoing Game
Noah Centineo	Followed the teaser for Street Fighter and presented Best Ongoing Game
David Dastmalchian	Followed the teaser for Street Fighter and presented Best Ongoing Game
Vidyut Jammwal	Followed the teaser for Street Fighter and presented Best Ongoing Game
Mel Jarnson	Followed the teaser for Street Fighter and presented Best Ongoing Game
Andrew Koji	Followed the teaser for Street Fighter and presented Best Ongoing Game
Callina Liang	Followed the teaser for Street Fighter and presented Best Ongoing Game
Jason Momoa	Followed the teaser for Street Fighter and presented Best Ongoing Game
Orville Peck	Followed the teaser for Street Fighter and presented Best Ongoing Game
Olivier Richters	Followed the teaser for Street Fighter and presented Best Ongoing Game
Cody Rhodes	Followed the teaser for Street Fighter and presented Best Ongoing Game
Andrew Schulz	Followed the teaser for Street Fighter and presented Best Ongoing Game
Rayna Vallandingham	Followed the teaser for Street Fighter and presented Best Ongoing Game
Felicia Day	Presented the Game Changer award
Gemma Chan	Introduced the Bawma reveal trailer for 007 First Light
Lenny Kravitz	Followed the Bawma reveal trailer and presented Best Score and Music
Megan Everett	Introduced the "Wake Up, Tenno" trailer for Warframe
Rebecca Ford	Introduced the "Wake Up, Tenno" trailer for Warframe
Rahul Kohli	Introduced the story trailer for Saros
Dan Houser	Presented the award for Best Narrative
Milla Jovovich	Followed the Hitman 3 trailer and presented Best Multiplayer Game
David Harbour	Introduced the reveal trailer for Total War: Warhammer 40,000
Todd Howard	Presented the award for Best Game Direction
Nicolas Doucet	Presented the award for Game of the Year

=== Performers ===
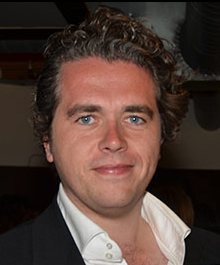
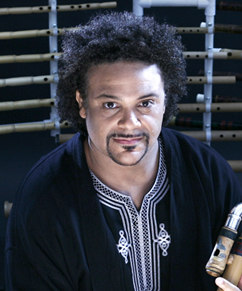
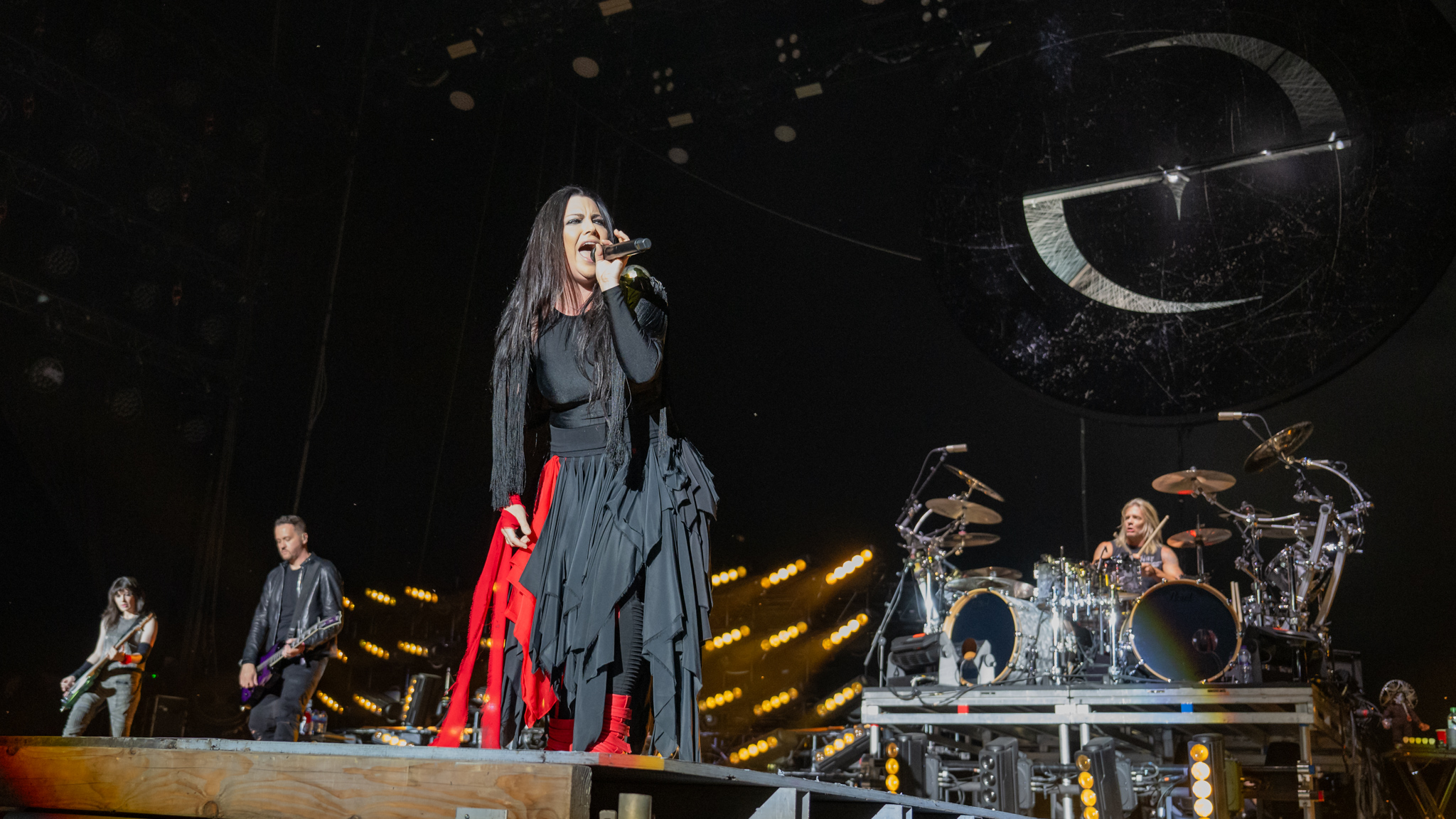
Lorne Balfe (top left) conducted the Game Awards Orchestra, featuring the "Flute Guy", Pedro Eustache (top right). Evanescence (bottom) performed "Afterlife" from Devil May Cry.

Lorne Balfe, the conductor of the Game Awards Orchestra, started considering music for the show before the nominations were announced; he researched the year's releases with his son to predict possible nominees. He sought to choose music that was popular among players, rather than simply selecting each game's theme music. The show opened with music from Clair Obscur: Expedition 33, which some journalists considered a hint at its awards success.

The following individuals or groups performed musical numbers.

Name	Song	Game(s) / show(s)
The Game Awards Orchestra (Note: Conducted by Lorne Balfe)	"Une vie à t'aimer"	Clair Obscur: Expedition 33
Alice Duport-Percier	"Une vie à t'aimer"	Clair Obscur: Expedition 33
Miki Martz	"Une vie à t'aimer"	Clair Obscur: Expedition 33
Lorien Testard	"Une vie à t'aimer"	Clair Obscur: Expedition 33
Evanescence	"Afterlife"	Devil May Cry
Miss Piggy (Note: Puppet performed by Eric Jacobson)	"The Game Awards Will Never Let You Down"	—N/a
Rowlf the Dog (Note: Puppet performed by Bill Barretta)	"The Game Awards Will Never Let You Down"	—N/a
The Game Awards Orchestra	"Dr. Wily Stage 1", from Mega Man 2	Mega Man: Dual Override
The Game Awards Orchestra	Game of the Year medley (Note: The Game of the Year medley's songs included: "Saint Barbara Theme" from Kingdom Come: Deliverance II; "To the Wilder" from Death Stranding 2: On the Beach; "Lumière" from Clair Obscur: Expedition 33; "Lace" from Hollow Knight: Silksong; "Death to Chronos" from Hades II; "Breaking Through (Heart of Gold)" from Donkey Kong Bananza)	Clair Obscur: Expedition 33
The Game Awards Orchestra	Game of the Year medley	Death Stranding 2: On the Beach
The Game Awards Orchestra	Game of the Year medley	Donkey Kong Bananza (Note: Performed with Jenny Kidd, who voiced Pauline in Donkey Kong Bananza)
The Game Awards Orchestra	Game of the Year medley	Hades II
The Game Awards Orchestra	Game of the Year medley	Hollow Knight: Silksong
The Game Awards Orchestra	Game of the Year medley	Kingdom Come: Deliverance II

== Reception ==
=== Nominees ===
Some viewers and journalists criticized the decision to discontinue the Future Class initiative. Several alumni felt they had been abandoned after not receiving responses from Keighley or Future Class organizer Emily Weir. Some suspected the initiative's discontinuation was in response to an open letter they wrote to Keighley in 2023. Polygon writers criticized the show's categories: Austin Manchester felt the term "indie" was misapplied, considering Clair Obscur: Expedition 33 and Dispatch to be double-A and triple-I, respectively; Paulo Kawanishi considered the Best Role Playing Game category too broad due to the diversity of its nominees; and Giovanni Colantonio suggested the show implement smaller, more knowledgeable juries (like the Academy Awards) for categories like Best Mobile Game to better represent genres and mediums. Some Clair Obscur: Expedition 33 cast members called for a new category for motion capture actors, and Charlie Cox credited his nomination to his character's motion-capture performer, Maxence Cazorla.

Several journalists highlighted the lack of Game of the Year nominations for Blue Prince, Ghost of Yōtei, Indiana Jones and the Great Circle, Silent Hill f, and Split Fiction, which they attributed to the quality of the competition, and felt ARC Raiders, Dispatch, Donkey Kong Bananza, and South of Midnight deserved additional nominations. Some thought The Hundred Line: Last Defense Academy deserved recognition for its narrative and Alex Jordan for his performance in The Alters. The Best Adaptation category was criticized for its nominees' mixed reception; some felt Sonic the Hedgehog 3 was snubbed, theorizing its December 2024 release date weakened its chances. Streamer Shroud, who won Content Creator of the Year in 2019 and was nominated for Trending Gamer in 2017, called the awards "rigged" after ARC Raiders was not nominated for Game of the Year, though journalists called these claims unfounded and noted the game had tough competition.

=== Ceremony ===
Avatar of Geoff Keighley

Geoff Keighley
(@geoffkeighley)
tweeted:

Thanks for watching The Game Awards. How would you grade this year's show?

A	15.1%
B	24.6%
C	21.4%
D or Below	38.9%
404,693 votes; Final results

December 11, 2025

Keighley's post-show Twitter poll received mixed responses, with almost 39% of over 404,000 votes grading the show "D or below". Kotaku's Alyssa Mercante criticized the ticket prices, noting that nominees received only two tickets and were required to buy more—priced between $58 for the upper mezzanine and $1,000 for the rear orchestra—for additional attendees, who were often seated apart. She highlighted the complications in mixing developer and public seating, referencing the 2022 stage interruption. Dozens of members of the union United Videogame Workers protested outside the Peacock Theater to raise awareness of recent industry layoffs, with some directing their message at Phil Spencer and Strauss Zelnick, the chief executive officers of Microsoft Gaming and Take-Two Interactive, respectively.

Several critics considered the show a celebration of smaller, independent games, citing Clair Obscur: Expedition 33's awards; Polygon's Oli Welsh compared its success to films like Everything Everywhere All at Once and Oppenheimer leading the Academy Awards in 2023 and 2024, respectively. GamesIndustry.biz's Rob Fahey suspected its success would lead to attempted emulations, though Kotaku's Ethan Gach considered its record-breaking status "overblown" and thought it should have been ineligible for the indie categories and Bloomberg News's Jason Schreier felt its sweeping wins removed tension from the awards. The French president, Emmanuel Macron, congratulated the developers, calling it "a great pride" for Montpellier and France. Gamepressure's Matt Buckley found the in-person excitement "contagious", lauding the show's atmosphere.

The Washington Post's Gene Park considered the ceremony more entertaining than previous years and praised the live staging but recommended different categories to celebrate fields like character and level design. Polygon's Claire Lewis criticized important awards being relegated to the preshow or announced in quick succession but applauded the lack of time restrictions for speeches and the quality of the announcements, writing, "Yes, it was a three-and-a-half-hour commercial. But it was a good three-and-a-half-hour commercial". Some critics named independent game announcements, like Bradley the Badger and Coven of the Chicken Foot, among the show's highlights, as well as the Resident Evil Requiem and two Tomb Raider trailers. Kotaku's Gach found most announcements unmemorable. Several journalists considered the show's final reveal—Highguard, a free-to-play first-person shooter from a new studio—questionable or lackluster, with some viewers expecting an announcement from an established series or different genre, though others found the trailer intriguing regardless.

=== Viewership ===
An estimated 171 million viewers watched the ceremony, the most in the show's history and an 11% increase from the previous year; the figure does not include Prime Video viewers. According to Streams Charts, the ceremony peaked at 4.4 million concurrent viewers—the most in its history and a 9% increase from 2024—including 1.4 million viewers on the official YouTube broadcast (an 8% increase) and 1.8 million on Twitch. On YouTube, the ceremony peaked at 2.4 million total concurrent viewers (a 9% increase), including a record 8,600 co-streams. More than 16,500 creators co-streamed on Twitch—a record for the show, representing a 50% yearly increase—with total unique viewers and hours watched each increasing 5% from 2024. On Twitter, posts about the show increased by 12%, with more than 1.79 million posts from December 10–12, while the broadcast and related videos received over 60 million views. Eurogamer's Connor Makar noted the figures "overshadowed" the 97th Academy Awards, which received 19.7 million viewers in the United States.
