= Megabonk =

2025 video game

- Developer: vedinad
- Publisher: vedinad
- Engine: Unity
- Platforms: Linux; Windows
- Release: September 18, 2025
- Genres: Roguelike; Survival game Vampire Survivors–like
- Mode: Single-player

Megabonk is a 2025 roguelike survival game developed and published by solo developer Vedinad. (Note: The pseudonymous developer also goes by "John Megabonk".) Described as a 3D Vampire Survivors–like, it features procedurally-generated maps, automatic combat against hordes of enemies, and character progression through randomized upgrades. The game was released for Windows and Linux on September 18, 2025.

== Gameplay ==
Gameplay screenshot showcasing the character CL4NK in the Desert map in combat with enemies

Megabonk is a third-person roguelike survival game in which the player navigates procedurally-generated 3D maps with verticality, fighting waves of enemies and bosses while automatically attacking. Experience gems collected from defeated enemies allows the player to level up and select from random upgrade offers, enabling synergistic builds. Movement mechanics include sliding, jumping, and speed boosts for enhanced mobility and combat depth. The game offers 20 unlockable characters with unique abilities, over 70 items, and more than 200 quests. Meta-progression is achieved through "Silver" currency, which lets the player permanently unlock content; it is not very common, being earned via challenges, "silvery-blue pots", and upgrading the Silver Tome.

== Development ==
Megabonk was developed by the independent designer known as Vedinad using the Unity engine, and began development in August 2024. Initially planned to release on September 4, 2025, it was delayed to September 18 due to the announcement that the anticipated Hollow Knight: Silksong would release on the same day. Vedinad was urged to delay the game further, due to announcements of "other massive games" releasing near Megabonk's planned launch, but they did not, stating in a video, "I don't care - boom! Megabonk is out right now".

=== Developer identity ===
The anonymity of Megabonk's creator has spawned speculation from the game's fan base regarding their identity. Their alias, Vedinad, is an anadrome of DaniDev, the username of game developer and YouTuber Daniel William Sooman, who has created the games Crab Game and Muck. Similarities have been drawn between Megabonk and Sooman's games, as well as Vedinad and Sooman's voices as featured on each of their YouTube channels. Sooman has not published a video to his channel since January 2022, but was known to have been working on a new project. When asked by Eurogamer if they were DaniDev, Vedinad declined to respond.

== Reception ==
=== Critical reception ===
Critics praised the game, and often favorably compared it to Vampire Survivors. TheGamer writer Harry Alston called it one of his favorite games of the year, praising it for its "added 3D terrain and verticality", being "properly challenging", and having "satisfying" build-crafting. Writing for Rogueliker, Mike Holmes called its gameplay loop "addictive", stating that the game is "excellent ... and a true trend setter." GamesHub writer Joel Loynds awarded it 4/5, lauding the refreshing 3D take and overpowered builds while criticizing repetitive challenges, difficulty spikes, and "memey" humor. Lords of Gaming's Randy Rhodes scored it 8.5/10, highlighting its tension, soundtrack, and character variety. IGN's Leana Hafer praised the "variety and ... bombastic attitude" of the weapons, called the power-ups "fun", but criticized its shoddy humor, and its "lack of changing scenery" due to there only being two maps. Despite initial skepticism, Ali Jones of GamesRadar+ enjoyed the game, stating "[t]here's something about being a skateboard-riding skeleton flinging bones at hordes of incoming goblins while careening down a ramp that's just compelling no matter what". The game was recommended by Palworld developer John 'Bucky' Buckley; he later said Vedinad is "one of the game developers I respect the most".

=== Commercial reception ===
Commercially, Megabonk was a success, selling over one million copies in two weeks and peaking at 117,336 concurrent players according to SteamDB. Megabonk also received "very positive" user reviews on Steam.

== Awards and nominations ==
Year	Award	Category	Result	Ref.
2025	The Game Awards 2025	Best Debut Indie Game	Nominated	
2025	The Steam Awards 2025	Sit Back and Relax Award	Nominated	

Megabonk was nominated for "Best Debut Indie Game" at The Game Awards 2025, but Vedinad withdrew (leading to the game not being listed as a nominee during the show), believing that it did not qualify for the award, as he has "made games in the past under different studio names"; Vedinad has not given further information. Megabonk was subsequently nominated in the 30-game first round for Players' Voice award.

== See also ==
- Vampire Survivors
- Vampire Survivors–like
