= Vampire Survivors–like =

Video game genre

Vampire Survivors–like, also known as Survivors-like, horde survivor, bullet heaven or reverse bullet hell, is a subgenre of shoot 'em up video games in which the player's character attacks automatically while the player maneuvers to survive successive waves of enemies. Typically, the player unlocks periodic upgrades to their attacks and passive abilities, with each successive run proceeding in the fashion of a roguelike.

The genre was popularized by Vampire Survivors in 2022, with a number of developers creating similar games to capitalize on its success.

== History ==
The genesis of the genre can be found in the 2019 mobile game Magic Survival (released 2018 in South Korea), which Vampire Survivors developer Luca Galante of Poncle drew from when designing its gameplay. Following the success of Vampire Survivors in 2022, various developers produced games with similar gameplay. These titles included HoloCure – Save the Fans!, Brotato, and 20 Minutes Till Dawn, among others. Some spin-offs of existing games were created in the Vampire Survivors–like genre, including Temtem: Swarm, based on the monster-taming game Temtem, which included a catching mechanic, and Deep Rock Galactic: Survivor. The genre's name was initially unclear, with "bullet heaven" and "reverse bullet hell" arising as early descriptors. Robin Valentine of PC Gamer faulted this terminology, favoring the name "survivor games" or "auto-shooters". Ex-Polygon journalist Jenna Stoeber in an investigation video came across a review calling the genre horde survivor which she described as "more accurate" than other proposed genre names.

In late 2025, a 3D Vampire Survivors–like, Megabonk, with retro-styled graphics, achieved sales of one million copies in two weeks. Its own developer, Vedinad, acknowledged the inspiration, calling it "Vampire Survivors but 3D".

The genre received its own Steam-featured event starting in 2023. In 2025, a coordinated effort united over 450 developers to finally canonize the tag on the platform. The initiative included a public poll that gathered over 8,000 responses to determine a preferred genre name. Event hosts provided their reasoning behind the event name in a dedicated report. Organizers argued that a standardized Steam tag would improve discoverability for both players and developers, as the genre had previously been fragmented across multiple loosely related tags. According to the poll results "bullet heaven" is the most popular name and supporting data were intended to be presented to Valve for consideration, following earlier precedents where community pressure influenced the introduction of new Steam tags. In a May 2026 update, Valve named the genre Bullet Heaven on their Steam tagging system.

Ahead of new releases based on Vampire Survivors, Poncle introduced the term "Survivaton", a play on the phrase "survive a ton", to describe these games. Poncle also added the subtitle "First Survivaton" to Vampire Survivors to distinguish it as the flagship game in this genre.

== Reception ==
Ed Thorn of Rock Paper Shotgun wrote that most Vampire Survivors clones did a poor job of distinguishing the player from the visual clutter in comparison to the original. William Hughes of The A.V. Club praised the large amount of clones, stating that "gaming is an inherently iterative medium, with the entire history of the art form made up of creators building on other people’s good ideas for play".
