= Laila Shabir =

Businesswoman and game developer

- Education: Massachusetts Institute of Technology

Laila Shabir is game developer known for founding the Girls Make Games summer camp that introduces girls and nonbinary children to computer game development.

== Early life and education ==
Shabir's family is from Pakistan and she grew up in the United Arab Emirates in the town of Al Ain. While her parents wanted Shabir and her sister to think independently, the environment around them expected more traditional actions from women. When she was not accepted to any universities in the United Arab Emirates, Shabir moved to the United States for college, and she graduated from the Massachusetts Institute of Technology where she studied economics.

== Career ==
After graduation, she was an intern at Merrill Lynch, and then worked at the National Bureau of Economic Research, the Federal Reserve Bank of Boston, and the investment company BlackRock. In 2013 Shabir and her husband, Ish Syed, co-founded LearnDistrict a company to make educational video games. Their first video game, Penguemic, was released in 2013.

Shabir started a camp, Girls Make Games, that focuses on introducing girls and nonbinary children to game development during three-week periods in the summer. The camp was started in 2014 when Shabir noticed the gender gap in applicants for jobs in the video game industry. In 2023, Girls Make Games announced a scholarship fund that aimed to makes college more affordable for alumni of the camp.

== Awards and honors ==
In 2014, GamesIndustry.biz included Shabir in their people of the year list in recognition for her work with Girls Make Games. In 2018 the Entertainment Software Association recognized Shabir with their visionary award for her work in broadening participation in game development; this was the first time a woman received this award.
