= Rectification movement =

Rectification movement may refer to:

- Yan'an Rectification Movement, first ideological mass movement initiated by the Chinese Communist Party
- First Great Rectification Movement, 1965 ideological movement by the Communist Party of the Philippines
- Second Great Rectification Movement, 1992 ideological movement by the Communist Party of the Philippines

== See also ==
- Rectification (disambiguation)
