= Rectification =

Rectification has the following technical meanings:

== Mathematics ==
- Rectification (geometry), truncating a polytope by marking the midpoints of all its edges, and cutting off its vertices at those points
- Rectifiable curve, in mathematics
- Rectifiable set, in mathematics

== Science ==
- GHK flux equation#Rectification, in biology, a process in cell membranes

== Technology ==
- Image rectification, adjustment of images to simplify stereo vision or to map images to a map coordinate system (GIS)
- The function of a rectifier, a device that converts alternating electrical current to direct current
- Rectified airspeed, a means of displaying the airspeed of high-speed aircraft
- Rectification (chemical/process engineering), countercurrent distillation, a unit operation also used for the production of rectified spirit (see Distillation#Fractional distillation)

== Other uses ==
- Rectification (law), an equitable legal remedy whereby a court orders a change in a written document to reflect what it should have said in the first place
- Rectification movement (disambiguation)
- Rectification of names (zhèngmíng), a practice in Confucian philosophy
- Rectification, a process that creates a rectified spirit (alcohol)

== See also ==
- Rectification movement (disambiguation)
- Rectifier (disambiguation)
- Rectify, American television series
