= Total War: Warhammer 40,000 =

Strategy video game

- Developer: Creative Assembly
- Publisher: Sega
- Series: Total War; Warhammer 40,000
- Platforms: Windows; PlayStation 5; Xbox Series X/S
- Release: 2027
- Genres: Turn-based strategy, real-time tactics
- Modes: Single-player, multiplayer

Total War: Warhammer 40,000 is an upcoming turn-based strategy and real-time tactics video game developed by Creative Assembly and published by Sega. It is part of the Total War series and is the first title to be set in Games Workshop's Warhammer 40,000 fictional universe. The game expands the series beyond the fantasy setting of the Total War: Warhammer trilogy, bringing the franchise into the far-future setting of the 41st Millennium. It is also the first installment of the Total War series to receive console versions.

== Development ==
The game was officially announced on 11 December 2025 during The Game Awards 2025, with a reveal trailer featuring David Harbour, a Warhammer 40,000 fan, who was announced to portray a character in the game. The game is scheduled for release on Microsoft Windows, PlayStation 5, and Xbox Series X/S, featuring four initial playable factions: Space Marines, Astra Militarum, Orks, and Aeldari.

Total War: Warhammer 40,000 was developed as a new chapter for the Total War franchise, introducing the series to the science-fantasy setting of Warhammer 40,000. Creative Assembly described the project as an expansion of the traditional Total War formula, combining strategic campaigns, cinematic battles, and player-driven choices with the scale of galactic warfare.

The game is being developed as a long-term project, with plans to expand it over multiple years through additional factions, heroes, war machines, and worlds from the Warhammer 40,000 universe. Creative Assembly aims to create "the ultimate game set in the Warhammer 40,000 universe", with future content expanding the game's galactic sandbox and bringing more of the setting's iconic forces into the game.

== Setting ==
Total War: Warhammer 40,000 is set during the Era Indomitus period of the Warhammer 40,000 universe, following the Fall of Cadia and the creation of the Great Rift. The game takes place during a period of renewed conflict across the galaxy, with the Imperium of Man divided between Imperium Sanctus and Imperium Nihilus. The game features the planet Armageddon, one of the most significant war zones in the setting, with the conflict involving forces of the Imperium of Man and the Orks.

== Gameplay ==
Total War: Warhammer 40,000 combines the traditional Total War campaign structure with futuristic warfare. Players command armies across a galactic sandbox, managing planets, resources, fleets, diplomacy, and military expansion while engaging in large-scale real-time battles. The game introduces ranged combat, armored vehicles, orbital bombardments, psychic abilities, destructive war machines, and army customization. Battles take place across war-torn worlds with faction-specific units, vehicles, and strategic abilities. Planetary campaigns are divided into regions across different biomes, including arid, temperate, ice, and waste worlds, with terrain and civilization density affecting battlefield layouts and combat.

The game features large-scale battle maps designed to reflect the vast scale of the Warhammer 40,000 universe. Environments can be heavily altered through destruction, allowing players to remove buildings, create new lines of sight, destroy cover, and reshape battlefields to suit their strategies. Orbital fleets can also provide support through devastating bombardments during ground engagements.

== Release ==
Creative Assembly planned to use Total War: Warhammer 40,000 as a long-term sandbox, with major releases and downloadable content built on the initial game rather than developing it as a trilogy. The game is scheduled for release in 2027.

== Reception ==
Following its announcement, journalists described Total War: Warhammer 40,000 as a natural successor to the Total War: Warhammer trilogy and highlighted the challenges of adapting the large-scale, galaxy-spanning setting of Warhammer 40,000 to the Total War formula. PC Gamer expressed optimism about the game's potential while noting that features such as large-scale planetary campaigns, faction customization, cover mechanics, and space warfare would be important to successfully capture the setting.
