= Wuthering Waves =

2024 action role-playing video game

- Developer: Kuro Games
- Publisher: Kuro Games (Note: Published in Hong Kong, Macau, and Taiwan by Nijigen Games (Operated by Kuro Games))
- Director: Solon Lee
- Producer: Solon Lee
- Programmer: Farmer
- Composers: jixwang; Minase; jkinss; YUE.STEVEN
- Engine: Unreal Engine 4
- Platforms: Windows; Android; iOS; PlayStation 5; macOS; Xbox Series X/S; HarmonyOS NEXT
- Release: Windows, Android, iOS; May 23, 2024; PlayStation 5; January 2, 2025; macOS; March 27, 2025; Xbox Series X/S; July 10, 2026
- Genres: Action role-playing, gacha, hack and slash
- Modes: Single-player, multiplayer

Chinese name
- Simplified Chinese: 鸣潮
- Traditional Chinese: 鳴潮
- Literal meaning: Sound Tide
Transcriptions
Standard Mandarin
- Hanyu Pinyin: Míng Cháo
Yue: Cantonese
- Yale Romanization: Mìhng Chìuh
- Jyutping: ming4 ciu4

Wuthering Waves (Chinese: 鸣潮; pinyin: Míng Cháo; lit. 'Sound Tide') is a 2024 free-to-play open world gacha action role-playing game developed and published by Kuro Games.

Revealed on March 23, 2022, it was initially inspired by Death Stranding, with the aim to create a post-apocalyptic world where players can experience the fusion of new and old civilizations. The game developers drew inspiration from various sources, including Punishing: Gray Raven for its combat mechanics, as well as the Pokémon games for its Echo system. Wuthering Waves has been compared to other titles of the genre such as Genshin Impact, but aims to place greater emphasis on its combat system compared to its predecessors. The game was released for Android, iOS and Windows devices on May 23 (May 22 in the United States), 2024, followed by PlayStation 5 in January 2025, macOS in March 2025, and Xbox Series X/S in July 2026.

== Gameplay ==
Gameplay screenshot showing character Yangyang engaging in a fight

Wuthering Waves is set in an open world. The player controls the protagonist Rover, as well as recruited allies called Resonators, which are split into 4-star and 5-star rarities. The endgame content features modes where characters can be used in a series of combat challenges.

The game's gacha system features banners known as Convenes, where Resonators and Weapons can be obtained. There are three types of Convenes: novice, event, and standard. Event Convenes are limited-time banners distinct from the permanent standard pool. They typically feature rate-up exclusive Resonators or weapons and rotate periodically as part of version updates. A pity system guarantees that 5-star items are obtained within a set amount of pulls.

The game features a large open world on the planet Solaris-3, with traversal mechanics designed to support various forms of exploration. Players can sprint across open fields without consuming stamina, though it drains during combat, wall-running or climbing. Additional movement options include scaling sheer walls and cliffs with the grappling hook, performing mid-air dodges and parries, and gliding from heights.

In addition, the game features region-specific traversal mechanics introduced in major updates. Version 2.0 introduced a flight module in the Rinascita region, featuring a dedicated stamina system that enables aerial movement such as ascent, descent, high-speed dives, and Ultra Flight Boost. The feature was later expanded to areas of Huanglong, including Jinzhou and the Black Shores.

In version 3.0, the Expedition Motorbike was introduced in the Lahai-Roi region as a primary ground vehicle, enabling high-speed travel, obstacle-jumping boosts powered by an energy system, adaptive grappling, and limited autopilot functionality on designated routes.

The game's combat system features Intro and Outro skills; Intro skills are triggered when the characters enter combat and Outro skills are triggered when the characters leave combat. Both skills are triggered when the characters are switched. In December 2025, a new combat feature got introduced adding more depth into the gameplay. After attacking enemies for a certain amount of times, they enter a special state. In this state characters can perform Tune Break dealing damage and canceling the attack of the enemy.

Resonators may acquire and equip Echoes from defeating enemies in the open world or in areas called Tacet Fields, completing quests, or participating in events, granting them abilities which summon or transform characters into monsters briefly and providing resonators with stats that increase their HP and/or damage.

== Plot ==
The game is set in a futuristic, post-apocalyptic world of Solaris-3. A catastrophe called the Lament wiped out most of humanity in Solaris-3 and caused unknown beings and monsters, called Tacet Discords, to appear. Over millennia, Solaris-3 underwent multiple Laments including regional Laments, and over time, humanity adapted to the threat and rebuilt civilization. Solaris-3 is divided into regions, with at least three nations introduced in the game: Huanglong, composed of seven cities each guarded by supernatural beings called Sentinels, Rinascita, a confederation of city-states governed by competing governing bodies, and Lahai-Roi, an underground tribal nation that houses a technologically advanced mechanoid called Exostrider.

The story follows the Rover, an amnesiac wanderer who has awakened from a deep slumber and sets out to explore this new world. The player takes the role of the Rover, either the male or the female iteration depending on the player's choice, as the protagonist of the game. They would be shortly thereafter joined by a companion named Abby, a small, levitating cat-like being who regularly communicates with others as they journey throughout the world in search of their past and origins. Shortly after, the Rover realizes that their previous iteration led an organization known as the Black Shores, whose goal is to combat against Threnodians and Tacet Discords that plague Solaris-3.

The game's main antagonists are the Fractsidus, a secret organization whose goal is to intensify the next and last Lament, which they call the True Lament. They view the Lament not as an apocalyptic event but as a step necessary for the evolution and improvement of humanity all over Solaris-3. Owing to their own perspective regarding the state and the fate of humanity, the organization is responsible for multiple attacks of varying scale all over Solaris-3.

== Development ==
Wuthering Waves is developed by the Guangzhou-based studio Kuro Games. It is directed by Solon Lee. It was first revealed in May 2022 with cinematic and teaser trailers. It was announced for iOS on March 25, 2024.

The game underwent two closed beta tests, with the second concluding in March 2024. After the first closed beta test, the story content was largely reworked in response to player feedback that it felt "uncomfortable".

On March 29, 2024, it was announced that Wuthering Waves was to be released on iOS, Android, and PC via the Epic Games Store in late May. In May 2024, it was announced that Wuthering Waves will be available via the Mac App Store in the future. Also from May of 2024, they upgraded to Unreal Engine 5 to upgrade out of Unreal Engine 4 in order to safely transition out of the older game engine. On March 21, 2025, it was announced that the game will be released via Steam on April 29, 2025.

The PlayStation 5 version was released on January 2, 2025, with version 2.0, and the Mac version was released on March 27, 2025. An Xbox Series X/S version was released in July 2026.

== Reception ==
=== Critical response ===
Reception

Aggregate scores
Aggregator	Score
Metacritic	iOS: 73/100; PC: 71/100; PS5: 76/100
OpenCritic	82% recommend

Review scores
Publication	Score
Famitsu	34/40
IGN	7/10
Jeuxvideo.com	15/20
PCMag	4/5
Pocket Gamer	4.5/5
RPGFan	90/100
GamingBolt	8/10

According to review aggregator Metacritic, Wuthering Waves received "mixed or average" reviews for the iOS and Windows version, and "generally favorable" reviews for the PlayStation 5 version. 80% of critics recommended the game according to OpenCritic.

Wuthering Waves had over 30 million pre-registered users from over 100 regions and initially launched to a mixed reception with some positive feedback. While some players pointed out some issues at the game's launch, others praised the game, saying it had the "best gameplay" among gacha games. Within its first week, it became the most downloaded in 100 regions. Some players were able to access unreleased content by changing the system clock. Other bugs included animation errors, such as issues with character movement. Some players who attempted to launch the game from the Epic Games store were met with a screen that read "Fatal Error", with a guide later being published on how to fix the issue.

At the same time, critics said that the generous rewards in Lustrous Tides currency made up for these bugs. On May 23, 2024, Kuro Games issued an apology to players and promised that players would receive in-game rewards as compensation for the game's issues. When patch 1.0.19 was released on May 29, a bug was found that caused the game's audio to become delayed or be removed altogether. Guides were later released on how to fix both bugs.

Despite the rocky launch, critics and the overall playerbase praised Wuthering Waves for its "refreshing" combat system, open world, and movement mechanics alongside its "forgiving" gacha system.

=== Commercial performance ===
In a September 2025 interview at Gamescom, Tencent senior vice president Steven Ma highlighted the game's sustained success, stating that Wuthering Waves was one of only six new titles from the preceding year to surpass Tencent's internal "Evergreen Game Revenue Line" benchmark (常青游戏收入线). Ma identified the six games as Zenless Zone Zero, Wuthering Waves, Love and Deepspace, Helldivers 2, Black Myth: Wukong, and Delta Force.

Ma explained that Tencent monitors approximately 70 global evergreen games meeting strict criteria for long-term viability (defined by Tencent as surpassing an average quarterly DAU of 5 million for mobile or 2 million for PC, while generating over RMB 4 billion or ~$550–600 million in annual gross receipts). Around 5 to 6 titles drop from this list annually. This recognition from Tencent indicates Wuthering Waves's achievement of sustained commercial performance in a competitive live-service and gacha-dominated market.

== Collaborations ==
In April 2026, during the announcement of Version 2.3, Kuro Games announced a collaboration event between Wuthering Waves and Cyberpunk: Edgerunners, which ran from June 8 to July 9, 2026, with Lucy and Rebecca being added to the game as playable characters. Although the storyline in the event takes place after the animated series itself, a majority of the events that were featured were not officially canon to the Cyberpunk universe.

== Accolades ==
Year	Award	Category	Result	Ref.
2024	Pocket Gamer Mobile Games Awards	Best Audio / Visual Accomplishment	Won	
2024	Pocket Gamer Mobile Games Awards	Game of the Year	Nominated	
2024	Galaxy Award	Best Science-Fiction Game	Won	
2024	The Game Awards 2024	Best Mobile Game	Nominated	
2024	The Game Awards 2024	Players' Voice	Nominated	
2024	TapTap Game Awards	Player's Choice	Won	
2024	Sensor Tower APAC Awards	Best Open World Adventure Game	Won	
2025	28th Annual D.I.C.E. Awards	Mobile Game of the Year	Nominated	
2025	The Game Awards 2025	Best Mobile Game	Nominated	
2025	The Game Awards 2025	Players' Voice	Won	
2025	Google Play's best apps, books and games of 2025	Best Ongoing	Won	
2025	16th Hollywood Music in Media Awards	Hollywood Music in Media Award for Best Original Song in a Video Game	Won	
2025	PlayStation Partner Awards	Partner Award	Won	
2025	PlayStation Partner Awards	Users’ Choice Award	Won	
2026	Taipei Game Show Game Star Award	Gold Award (Console Game)	Won	
2026	Taipei Game Show Game Star Award	Gold Award (Mobile Game)	Won	
2026	Taipei Game Show Game Star Award	Gold Award (PC Game)	Won	
2026	Golden Joystick Awards	Still Playing Award (Mobile)	Nominated	
2026	Thailand Game Awards	Best Ongoing Game	Won	
2026	Thailand Game Awards	Popular Vote	Won	
2026	17th Hollywood Music in Media Awards	Hollywood Music in Media Award for Best Original Song in a Video Game	Nominated	
2026	17th Hollywood Music in Media Awards	Live Concert for Visual Media	Nominated	

== Other media ==
A Chinese animated series, titled Wuthering Waves: Elysium, was announced on July 18, 2026.Production is currently being led by Kuro Games' new animation label Kuro Onroad.
