= Mega Man: Dual Override =

Upcoming video game

- Cover art featuring Mega Man (left) and Proto Man (right)
- Developer: Capcom
- Publisher: Capcom
- Director: Shinya Ikuta
- Producers: Shingo Izumi; Hiroyuki Minamitani
- Artists: Yuji Ishihara; Shinsuke Komaki
- Series: Mega Man
- Platforms: Nintendo Switch; Nintendo Switch 2; PlayStation 4; PlayStation 5; Windows; Xbox One; Xbox Series X/S
- Release: Q1–2 2027
- Genre: Platform
- Mode: Single-player

Mega Man: Dual Override (Note: Known in Japan as Rockman: Dual Override (ロックマン: デュアル オーバーライド)) is an upcoming platform game developed and published by Capcom. The game will be the 12th main installment in the Mega Man series, following Mega Man 11 (2018). It is set to be released in 2027 for Nintendo Switch, Nintendo Switch 2, PlayStation 4, PlayStation 5, Windows, Xbox One, and Xbox Series X/S.

== Gameplay ==
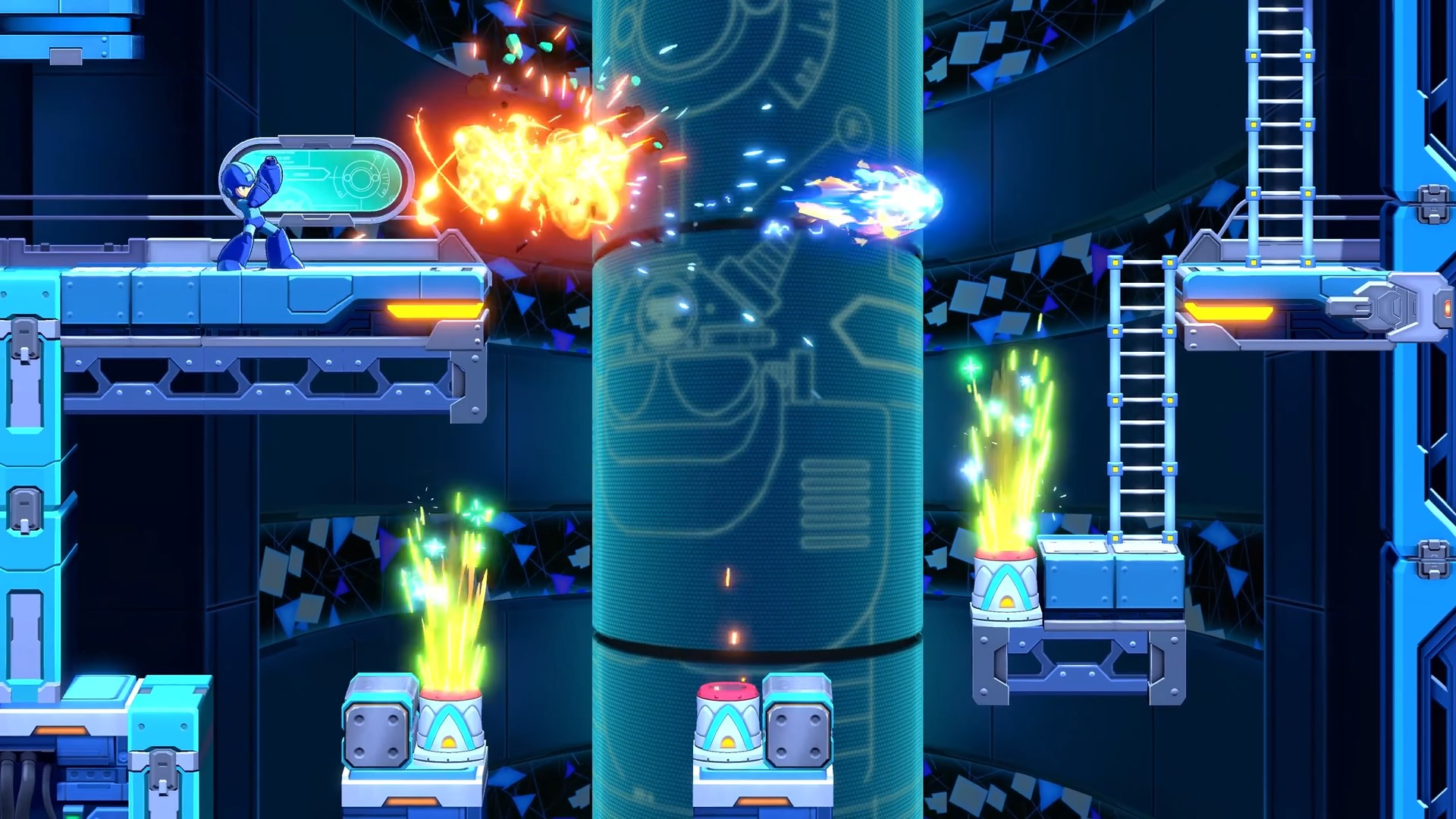
Screenshot from the reveal trailer, showcasing Mega Man using the charge shot

Like prior games in the series, Mega Man: Dual Override is a 2D platformer where the player must defeat Dr. Wily and his Robot Masters. Players control Mega Man and Proto Man in side-scrolling levels, each of whom has unique abilities and can attack using a standard weapon or special weapons acquired from other Robot Masters. New to the game are chips, which the player can equip before starting a stage to modify their character's abilities, and the "Override" ability, which allows the characters to use a more powerful attack after building up a meter.

== Development and promotion ==
In December 2025, Capcom stated that they wanted to regrow Mega Man back into being one of their "core IPs". Later that week, Mega Man: Dual Override was announced at The Game Awards 2025, where a gameplay trailer was shown, which ended by revealing that the game is slated for 2027, coinciding with the franchise's 40th anniversary. IGN writer Michael Cripe described the trailer as showcasing "promising vibrant visuals". Some press outlets noted the presence of Proto Man's whistle in the trailer, implying the character would appear in the game, which was later confirmed.

Benjamin Diskin, who provided the English voice for Mega Man in Mega Man 11, confirmed he was asked to return for Dual Override, but refused when Capcom would not allow him to work under a union contract. Diskin cited concerns over generative AI protection as his decision for leaving the role. Due to Capcom failing to initiate the signatory process, SAG-AFTRA issued a "Do Not Work" order to all members in regards to the game.

At the 2026 Gamescom event, Capcom revealed several new details, including Proto Man's inclusion and the first confirmed Robot Master, Twinkle Girl.

=== Robot Master contest ===
Alongside the announcement, Capcom started a Robot Master design contest, where fans were able to submit their ideas for a boss; six winners were chosen by fan vote from twenty finalists, one of which being the "grand-prize winner" that would be implemented into the game. This type of event was formerly done for early classic Mega Man games, and some Mega Man Battle Network entries. The winner, Cleanser Man, was announced in November 2026.
