= Highguard =

Defunct 2026 video game

- Developer: Wildlight Entertainment
- Publisher: Wildlight Entertainment
- Directors: Chad Grenier; Jason McCord
- Designer: David Bocek
- Artist: Robert Taube
- Writer: Jason Torfin
- Composer: Cris Velasco
- Engine: Unreal Engine 5
- Platforms: PlayStation 5; Windows; Xbox Series X/S
- Release: January 26, 2026
- Genre: Hero shooter
- Mode: Multiplayer

Highguard was a hero shooter video game developed and published by Wildlight Entertainment. It was released for PlayStation 5, Windows, and Xbox Series X/S on January 26, 2026. A player versus player (PvP) raid shooter, the game cast players as "Wardens" competing in team-based matches combining first-person shooter mechanics with mounted combat and destructible environments.

Highguard received a mixed critical reception upon launch, with player counts dropping 90% from its launch peak within a week. The game was shut down on March 12, 45 days after its release, following a failure to establish a sustainable player-base and the withdrawal of its primary financial backer.

== Gameplay ==
Highguard was a player versus player raid shooter where players took on the roles of "Wardens", characters described as arcane gunslingers who fight for control over a mythical continent. Matches involved competing with rival crews to secure pivotal objectives such as the "Shieldbreaker", which enables teams to launch assaults on enemy bases. The game combined traditional first-person shooter mechanics with elements such as mounted combat, destructible environments, and fantasy-inspired abilities. It supported cross-platform play and cross-progression across all its launch platforms.

== Development ==
The game was developed by Wildlight Entertainment, a studio founded by Dusty Welch, Chad Grenier, and 60 other industry veterans, many of whom previously worked on notable shooter franchises including Apex Legends, Call of Duty, and Titanfall. Highguard was Wildlight Entertainment's debut title.

The game was initially created as a survival-focused shooter similar to Rust. The game's development began in 2022 and lasted four years before the game was released. It was intended to be a "shadow drop", releasing shortly after its reveal with minimal marketing in order to "let the game speak for itself". In February 2023, the studio announced that it was working on a new AAA video game title that had been in development “for some time.”

However, after two years of the development, Wildlight refocused the project in January 2024 to concentrate on highly competitive gameplay and the raid-based aspects of the existing game, abandoning the survival mechanics. The team experimented with four teams of three before arriving at the game's 3v3 format. Testing found that the game proved to be overly complicated in its mechanics and difficult to play without voice chat, but an open beta test was attempted.

It was reported in February 2026 that, according to unnamed sources who spoke to the outlet Game File, TiMi Studio Group, a subsidiary of Chinese conglomerate Tencent, had been the undisclosed primary financial backer of the game. The claim has not been substantiated by either TiMi or Wildlight.

== Marketing and release ==
Highguard was revealed at the Game Awards on December 11, 2025. Geoff Keighley presented the game as the show's final world-premiere reveal. Keighley highlighted the game as a project from a team of veteran developers known for their work on Apex Legends and Titanfall. According to Forbes, his decision to feature Highguard in the finale slot was based on his support for the game rather than any paid promotion.

Wildlight Entertainment remained silent on social media regarding the game's status until January. In January 2026, the studio announced a showcase to debut gameplay on January 26, 2026, ahead of the game's launch. The presentation featured a full gameplay deep dive and outlined year-one plans, with content creators invited to the studio to play the game. Highguard was released on January 26, 2026, and peaked at nearly 100,000 players. However, it lost 90% of its player base in the first week.

The studio revealed a "2026 Game Plan" outlining future content releases by episode, each spanning one or two months, over the course of the first year. Responding to player criticism, Wildlight released an update that expanded the game to a 5v5 format.

=== Shutdown ===
In February 2026, it was reported that, according to unnamed sources, the studio's management revealed in an all-hands meeting that Tencent had withdrawn its funding. The studio announced layoffs, with only a "core group" remaining to support Highguard's development. Wildlight stated: "We're proud of the team, talent, and the product we've created together. We're also grateful for players who gave the game a shot, and those who continue to be a part of our community." Speculation about the game's impending closure began on February 17 after the game's website went down for unexplained reasons, though at the time the game's servers remained online. On the game's official Discord server, a developer from Wildlight stated that the game was still being worked on and that the website was in the process of being fixed but that it was a low priority as the "reputational damage" had already occurred.

On March 3, Wildlight announced that Highguard would be taken offline. Reporters noted that its shutdown has come on the heel of several other recent live service game failures, namely Concord. The game was delisted from digital storefronts, and its servers went offline just after 18:00 (UTC) on March 12. On March 18, it was reported that Sony began issuing automatic refunds to those who purchased content on the PlayStation 5 version.

== Reception ==
=== Critical response ===
Reception

Aggregate scores
Aggregator	Score
Metacritic	(PC) 63/100 (Note: Based on 29 reviews) (PS5) 62/100 (Note: Based on 10 reviews)
OpenCritic	39% recommend

Review scores
Publication	Score
GameSpot	6/10
GamesRadar+	3/5
PC Gamer (UK)	65/100
Push Square	6/10

The PC version of Highguard received "mixed or average" reviews according to review aggregator website Metacritic. OpenCritic assessed that 39% of critics recommended the game.

Concluding his review for Push Square, Aaron Bayne described Highguard as "a fun yet bloated shooter that lacks the spark you'll find in other games in the genre", as well as "a jack of all trades and master of none". Bayne praised the gameplay while criticizing the "uninspired" artstyle, "bloated" match mechanics, and "lacking" progression systems.

In a review for PC Gamer, Morgan Park noted that, while the game in their view leaned too heavily towards being for a competitive esports scene, the addition of a 5v5 mode in its first week suggests a willingness on the part of the developers to experiment with a more casual game style which they believed gave it hope for improvement despite currently surmising the game as "simply fine". Writing for GameSpot, Stella Chung echoed with similar sentiments stating that they felt the game "isn't ready for prime time", with them highlighting that while the movement mechanics and close-range gunplay were enjoyable, longer-range combat was less so and that playing solo was a "miserable" experience. Ford James of Polygon made further similar remarks regarding a lack of polish, stating the game felt like an "early access release", and also critiquing the solo experience but praising elements of the combat, while also believing it failed to offer a unique experience. For GamesRadar+, Will Sawyer surmised the game's experience as being "less than the sum of its parts" and lacking a strong identity, but did praise the developers for being willing to listen to player feedback and conclude that despite its flaws it remained a fun shooter.

=== Impact of the Game Awards trailer ===
Following the game's release and mixed reception, there was comment from some involved in development of the game regarding the impact of the initial release trailer at the Game Awards 2025. Wildlight's chief executive officer Dusty Welch, speaking to PC Gamer, would state that they did not pay for the trailer's placement at the show, and commented that in retrospect they would have made a trailer that better demonstrated the game's "unique loop". Following layoffs in February, former lead technical artist Josh Sobel stated they believed that the trailer's negative reception had an undeniable impact on the game's "failure" at launch, likening it to slander.

=== Metrics ===
Highguard reached an all-time peak of over 97,000 concurrent players within the first hour after the game's launch despite receiving mostly negative user reviews on Steam. By the following day, its player count dropped to under 20,000 on Steam. Over the course of the week, the day-to-day peak player count remained below this number and the users reviews improved to mixed on Steam. A week after the game's launch, the player count had dropped by 90%, which was concerning to Highguard staff. By mid-February, the day-to-day peak player counts had fallen to 1,600 on Steam, and had fallen below 600 by the month's end.

In March 2026, Wildlight stated that the game reached more than two million players, but had not built a sustainable player base to support the game long term.
