= Girls Make Games =

American organization

- Girls Make Games logo
- Formation: 2014
- Founder: Laila Shabir
- Website: www.girlsmakegames.com

Girls Make Games is an American organization established in 2014 which aims to support and encourage girls to pursue careers in the video game industry. The organization runs annual summer camps open to young girls where they learn how to design and build a video game.

== History ==
Girls Make Games was established in 2014 by Laila Shabir and her husband. Shabir had moved from the United Arab Emirates to the United States to study at MIT, where she rediscovered the positive influence video games could have. After starting a game development studio focusing on education games called LearnDistrict and discovering that the vast majority of applicants were male, the pair decided to pursue initiatives to address the lack of women in the industry. Shabir sent a Tweet proposing the idea of a summer camp for girls, which received a large volume of support, including by developers such as Tim Schafer. The first camp was held at the Computer History Museum, and Shabir found that there was quickly demand for more camps across the United States. Within a few months 14 other camps were being planned. The first camp in Canada ran in 2018.

During the organization’s first year it received support from companies like Google and Intel, and in 2015 launched an Indiegogo campaign to fund scholarship programs for girls who couldn't afford the attendance fee. Game development companies including Riot Games, BioWare, and Double Fine have hosted field trips for camp attendees. In 2018 Google Play partnered with the organisation to run a game design competition with a college scholarship prize.

Initially, Girls Make Games was a program run by LearnDistrict, delaying the development of their own video game projects, only later becoming a distinct organisation.

Shabir says her ultimate aim with the organization is to make itself obsolete, with the games industry containing a significant proportion of women. In 2018 Shabir won the Entertainment Software Association's 'visionary' award.

In 2017, after Naughty Dog artist Alexandria Neonakis posted a series of tweets about the harassment her and other female video game developers were receiving, particularly from intolerant communities on the Internet, she and other developers donated thousands of dollars to Girls Make Games in response.

In 2025, Girls Make Games won the "Game Changer Award" at The Game Awards 2025.

== Initiatives ==
Girls Make Games organizes and supports worldwide summer camps, workshops, and game jams. The organization also publishes resources and information for parents and teachers about careers in the games industry, and runs a fellowship for young women entering the industry.

=== Summer camps ===
The organization runs summer camps around the United States, Canada, and Australia and is looking to expand globally, having run individual events in other locations including London. The summer camps run for three weeks and support groups of girls between 8 and 17 to create a video game. On the first day of the camp, attendees play a range of indie video games enabling the organizers to place them in groups based on their interests. At the end of the three week period attendees play and test each other's games, and each group presents their finished game to a panel of experts. During the camp, high achievers can win prizes such as plushies.

In 2014 the first winning group – The Negatives – successfully funded their summer camp game The Hole Story via Kickstarter, raising over US$31,000. With support from LearnDistrict, the game was released in 2015. The second year's winner was Interfectorem, which also received funding via Kickstarter.

Camps are often hosted by video game development companies, with events having been hosted at Nintendo, Xbox, PlayStation, and Zynga. Participating organizations help fund the event, including offering scholarships for attendance. Girls Make Games also provide a free itinerary and workbook for hosting unofficial workshops.

By 2019, more than 6,000 girls had attended a Girls Make Games summer camp or workshop.
