= Punishing: Gray Raven =

2019 action role-playing game

- App icon depicting Lucia
- Developer: Kuro Games
- Publisher: Kuro Games
- Composers: GhostFinal; Haloweak; CoyDe; Polyblue; Rabbit J
- Engine: Unity
- Platforms: Android; iOS; Windows
- Release: Android, iOS: CHN: December 5, 2019; JP: December 4, 2020; WW: July 16, 2021; Windows: WW: May 14, 2023
- Genres: Action role-playing, hack and slash
- Mode: Single-player

Punishing: Gray Raven (Chinese: 战双帕弥什, lit. 'Punishing: Double Fight') is a free-to-play action role-playing game developed and published by Kuro Games. It was first released in China on December 5, 2019, in Japan on December 4, 2020, and globally on July 16, 2021. The game was released on Microsoft Windows in May 2023 and later distributed through Steam in February 2026.

== Gameplay ==
Titular logo

Punishing: Gray Raven have players control a squad of up to three characters, known as "Constructs", against various enemies. Storytelling is presented in a visual novel format, while combat is hack and slash action-based, with the player fighting enemies in real-time in various stages. During combat, different colored "Pings" can be obtained, which will fire off different skills. Chaining 3 Pings with the same color will execute a powerful version of that skill. Players may also evade enemy attacks, which will trigger a bullet time effect called Matrix upon successful evasion, slowing down time and allowing the player to land additional hits to the enemy or take better position along with giving the next used orb a temporary ability to activate 3-ping version. Evading attacks will consume stamina, which prevents players from freely dodging all the time (visually stamina bar is dodge button's outline).

Constructs can be strengthened by leveling up and promoting them, as well as leveling up weapons and equipping "memories" (which add pure stats to character, also majority of them have special effects upon equip 2, 4 and 6 pieces). Players can unlock additional Constructs by advancing the story, and more Constructs can be obtained via a gacha mechanic and in-game events. In-game currencies can be obtained through in-app purchases and playing the game, which are used to obtain Constructs and equipment through the gacha system. A pity system ensures that the player will receive rare items after a set number of pulls (60 or ~80–100, depends on banner type).

The game also features a housing system in the form of Dormitories. Players may decorate and move in Constructs to their dorms to improve their mood. Constructs can also be assigned chores to obtain in-game materials.

== Plot ==
The story of the game takes place in a post-apocalyptic world that has been overrun by Corrupted cybernetic enemies because of the Punishing Virus. The surviving humans have left Earth and escaped to the space station Babylonia. The player takes on the role as the Commandant of Gray Raven, an elite squad of Constructs who fight against the Corrupted and other opposing forces to retake the planet.

== Reception ==
Reception

Aggregate score
Aggregator	Score
Metacritic	83/100

Review scores
Publication	Score
Pocket Gamer	4.5/5
Screen Rant	3.5/5
GamerBraves	9/10
Multiplayer.it	8.6/10

Punishing: Gray Raven received "generally favorable reviews" according to review aggregator Metacritic. Pocket Gamer praised Punishing: Gray Raven as "a highly engaging game with one of the best storylines I've ever encountered so far". Screen Rant criticized the game's localization, but praised the combat system, comparing it with Honkai Impact 3rd for their similarities in gameplay. GamerBraves commended the game's optimization and "punishing but addictive combat". Multiplayer.it highlighted the long campaign and characters, but finds faults in the short missions and gacha elements.

As of July 2020, the game has surpassed 20 million downloads.

== Related media ==
=== Animation ===
Panini: Gray Raven animation PV art

Panini: Gray Raven (Chinese: 战双帕尼尼; pinyin: Zhàn shuāng pà ní ní) is a short web animation based on the world view of Punishing: Gray Raven. It was produced by Big Firebird Cultural Media Co., ltd.(Chinese: 大火鸟文化; pinyin: Dàhuǒ niǎo wénhuà). It officially began broadcasting on the Bilibili platform on October 27, 2020.

=== Theme songs ===
- Two Flowers (Chinese: 二輪之花; pinyin: Èrlún zhī huā) (Japanese: 二輪の花、にりんのはな)
  Singer: Yui Ishikawa
  Composer: T-nymph
  Lyrics: Mira.Z, Ichisaki Miki
  Produced by: Vanguard sound
- Moon (Chinese: 月; pinyin: Yuè)

Singer: Natsu Doko (Japanese: Kugimiya Rie )
Arranger: Haloweak
Composer& Lyrics: Mira.Z
Produced by: Vanguard sound

- Narwhal

Composer: Haloweak

Produced by: Vanguard sound

- LAMIA

Music: GhostFinal

Video: MDR

Produced by: Vanguard sound

- NANAMI IKIMASU

Music：@Super.Yy酱 &@墨蓝酱油Polyblue

Composer: CoyDe & Polyblue

Producer：Vanguard Sound & Kuro Games

- Revelation

Singer: Kinoko_蘑菇

Composer& Lyrics: GhostFinal
Produced by: Vanguard Sound & Kuro Games

- Gaze of Wind (Chinese: 风的视线; pinyin: Fēng de shìxiàn) (Japanese: 風の視線)
  Music: GhostFinal
  Adapted by: M€I & GhostFinal
  Lyrics: Mira.Z
  Singer: Asagiri Sakako (Japanese: Ito Miku )
  Produced by: Vanguard sound, Michitaku Iwano
- Me (Chinese: 我; pinyin: Wǒ) (Japanese: 私)
  Singer: Liu Feifei (Japanese: Inoue Marina)
  Arranger: Tureleon
  Lyrics: baker (TOKYOLOGIC)
  Production: baker (TOKYOLOGIC)
- Echoing
  Vocals: Liu Zhixiao
  Arranger: Zhou Cun
  Lyricist: Roland L.
  Production: Kuro Studio
- DIM LIGHT
  Vocal: Electric Bird Lightbulb (Japanese: Matsuoka Masaki )
  Arranger: MeLo
  Lyricist: Hideo Noguchi
  Produced by: Vanguard sound
- Long Way Home (Chinese: 長路歸航; pinyin: Zhǎng lù guī háng)

Singer: Shanghai Rainbow Chamber Choir (Japanese: Wada Yuki, Remi, SAK., KOCHO Takimoto Shinko, Hongo Shiori, Aikawa Mika, Matsuoka Daimi, Sho Yuya)
Arranger: Xu Xiao (Japanese: KOCHO)
Lyrics: Kocho
Produced by: Kuro Studio
