= Sandfall Interactive =

French video game developer

- Type: Private
- Industry: Video games
- Founded: 9 October 2020; 6 years ago
- Founder: Guillaume Broche (CEO); François Meurisse (COO); Tom Guillermin (CTO)
- Headquarters: Montpellier, France
- Products: Clair Obscur: Expedition 33
- Number of employees: 32 (2025)
- Website: sandfall.co

Sandfall Interactive is a French independent video game developer founded in 2020 by Guillaume Broche, Tom Guillermin and François Meurisse. Located in Montpellier, the studio was originally established to bring to fruition a personal role-playing video game project Broche had been working on since 2019. In addition to its main office in southern France, Sandfall has a small office in Paris, where its cinematic artists and animators are based.

Initially titled We Lost, Broche's project would ultimately be revamped into Clair Obscur: Expedition 33, Sandfall's debut game. Released in April 2025, Expedition 33 was met with universal acclaim from critics, won a myriad of accolades and sold over 8 million copies in its first year.

== Origins ==
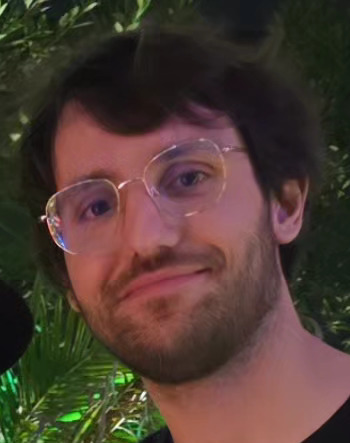
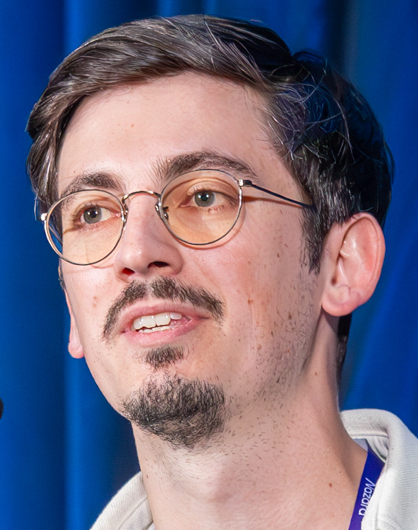
Sandfall Interactive was founded by creative director Guillaume Broche (left), technical director Tom Guillermin (right), and producer François Meurisse.

Sandfall originates in 2019 with Guillaume Broche, an employee of Ubisoft, during his stint at Massive Entertainment in Malmö, Sweden. Not being employed in a technical role at the company, he began exploring the capabilities of Unreal Engine in his spare time. A huge aficionado of Japanese role-playing games, this curiosity soon evolved into a personal passion project inspired by his favorite childhood games—most notably the Final Fantasy series—with the goal of creating a prototype for a real-time RPG. Early in the prototype development phase, to craft the reactive turn-based combat system, Broche had sought the help of Tom Guillermin, a gameplay programmer and fellow young French employee at the same Malmö-based Ubisoft subsidiary, whom he had befriended.

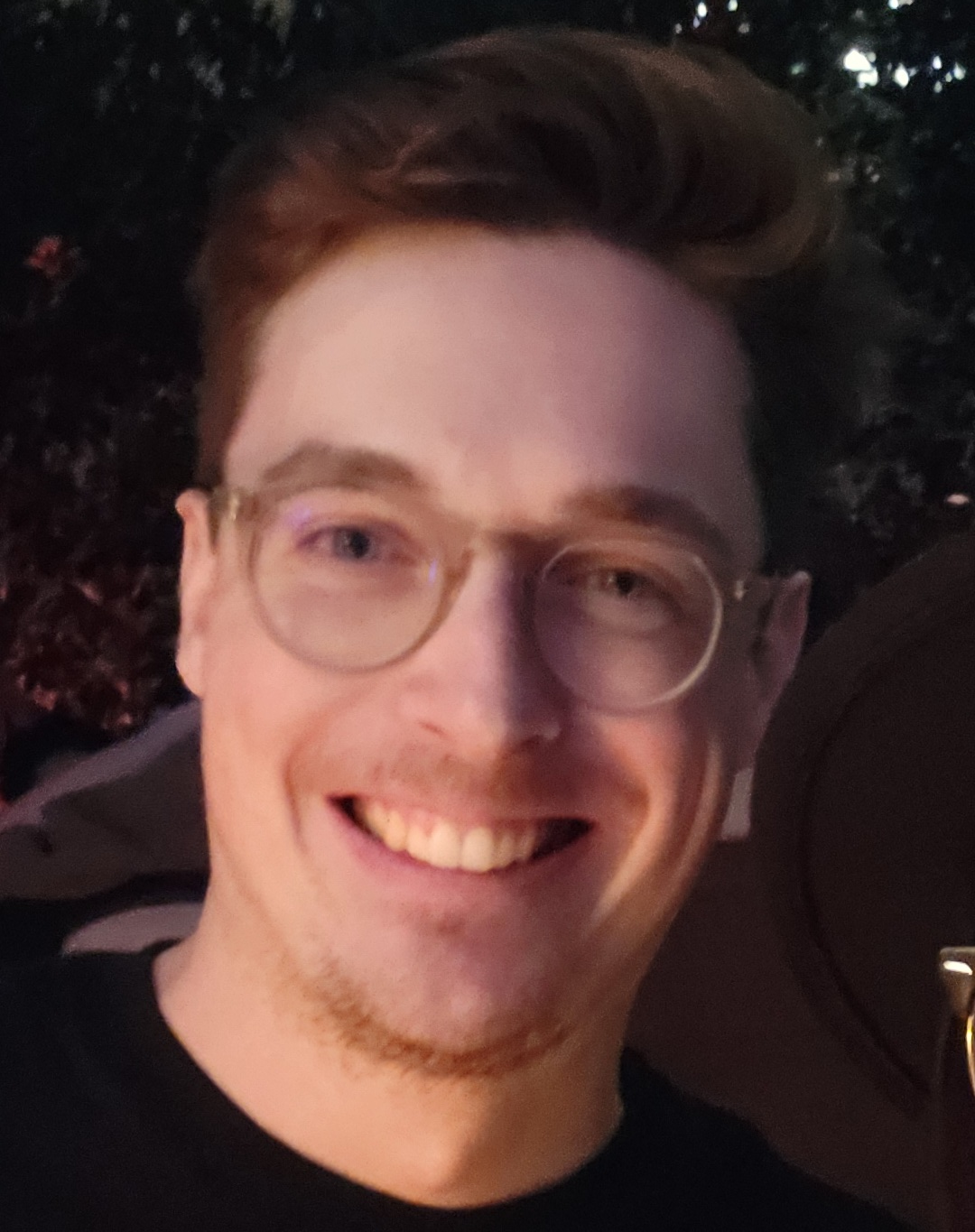
Art director Nicholas Maxson-Francombe (left) and lead writer Jennifer Svedberg-Yen (right)

He would later reach out to find collaborators for a demo, including on Reddit (Note: on the subreddit r/RecordThisForFree) where he looked for voice actors in April 2020. In order to focus on the project full-time, Broche, who had been transferred from Massive Entertainment to Ubisoft Shanghai in September 2019, would leave the company a year later during the COVID-19 pandemic to establish Sandfall Interactive, alongside Guillermin and François Meurisse, a friend he had met during his university days. The three co-founders, respectively CEO, CTO and COO of the company, were joined by Lorien Testard, Nicholas Maxson-Francombe and Jennifer Svedberg-Yen; the six forming the kick-off team. Lorien Testard, the studio's composer, was discovered by Broche through a post on a French indie video game forum where he linked a track from his SoundCloud page. Maxson-Francombe, the art director, was discovered and recruited off ArtStation by Broche. Svedberg-Yen, one of the voice actors cast for the original demo as a result of the Reddit post and whom Broche had befriended, soon gained a more prominent role in the project, assisting him in writing the script; as development progresses, she would ultimately become the sudio's lead writer. Initially based in a western suburb of Paris where it was founded in October 2020, Sandfall officially relocated to Montpellier in April 2021 and the original project envisioned by Broche, titled We Lost, was ultimately revamped into Clair Obscur: Expedition 33.

== Growth ==
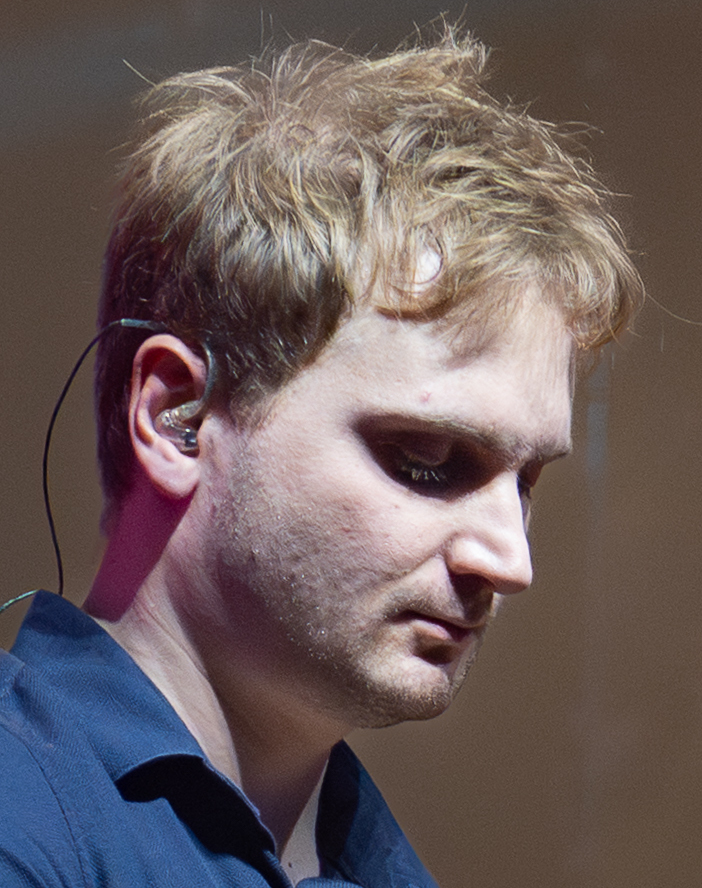
Environment and props artist Mathieu Costat (left), alongside lead character artist Alan Reynaud (center) who was one of the first recruits to join the kick-off team music composer Lorien Testard (right) belonged to.

After the studio was founded, over 200 interviews were conducted in the following months in order to gather its first conventionally recruited employees. Between April and October 2021, game designer Thomas Frappart, technical UI artist Brieuc Inisan, (Note: a Sandfall employee from April 2021 to June 2024) lead character artist and character co-designer Alan Reynaud, lead environment artist Carla Devèze, technical artist Alexandre Breton, VFX artist Léo Paris and principal sound designer Maxance Playez, all joined Sandfall. The team of around a dozen people then moved on to more advanced prototypes with the ultimate goal of creating a vertical slice to pitch to publishers, as efforts to find one willing to finance the project had been largely unsuccessful.

Thanks to a few angel investors, as well as relatives, friends and multimedia arts-dedicated public grants Sandfall applied for, the co-founders were able to properly structure the nascent studio. The team successfully built the vertical slice, which they pitched to publishers at the Game Developers Conference in March 2022. This vertical slice validated the game’s concept and helped secure production funding from publisher Kepler Interactive. Previously renting a small workspace within the office of Montpellier-based post-production company Audio Workshop, Sandfall was able to move to a place of its own near downtown to prepare for the studio's growth, after having inked its partnership with Kepler in the first semester of 2022. Taking the unusual form of an early 20th-century Art Deco-style town mansion instead of a traditional corporate office, the founders wanted it to feel like a cozy home for the team. The office is facetiously nicknamed "Le Manoir" (The Manor) due to it coincidentally resembling a mini-version of the eponymous estate Sandfall had already fully conceived for Expedition 33.

Music designer Raphaël Joffres (left), sound designer Olivier Penchenier (center) and principal sound designer Maxance Playez (right) are members of Sandfall's sound design team

With the vertical slice having marked the completion of the pre-production phase, the secured budget enabled the team to move onto developing an alpha version of the game and continue recruiting the necessary talent; notably additional programmers, game designers, character and level artists, and the studio's cinematic artists, cinematic animators as well as its video and capture artists. Sandfall soon grew into a company of about 30 to 40 employees, a few of whom—including Broche and Guillermin—had formerly worked at Ubisoft. These new recruits included Michel Nohra (a specialist in combat systems, progression, economy and balance) who would spearhead the studio's game design unit as the lead game designer; music designer Raphaël Joffres who would lead the sound design unit; and senior gameplay programmer Forian Torres, UI and gameplay programmer Victor Boulez and engine programmer Jérôme Vaglienti, who would join the programming and UI unit.

Within the studio, technical director and lead programmer Guillermin heads the programming and UI unit, while production director Meurisse is in charge of the operations and production unit. Broche, meanwhile, as the creative director, drives the overarching artistic vision, and steers the game design and cinematic units, while also co-authoring the narratives and scripts of Sandfall's games.

== Consecration ==
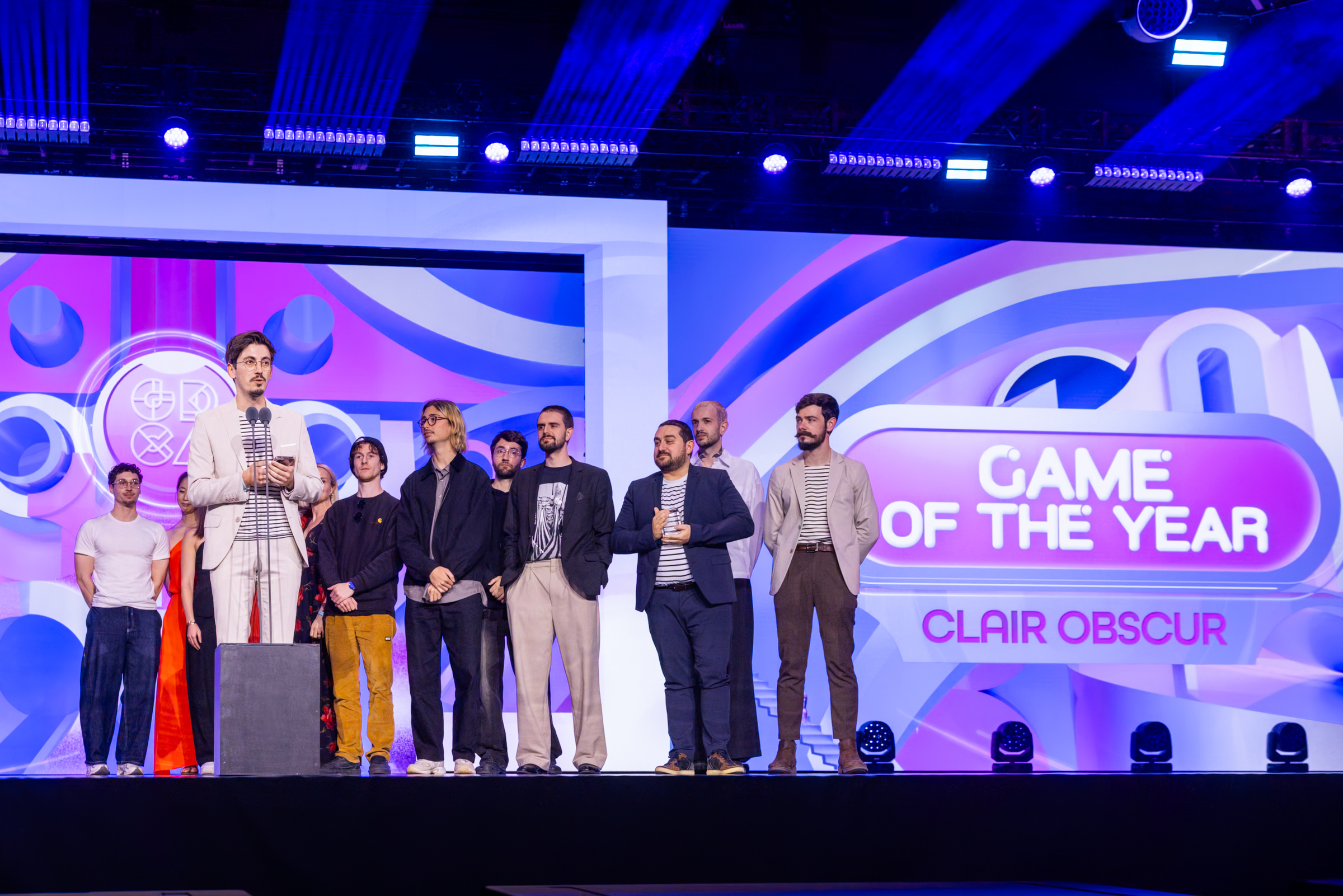
Members of Sandfall Interactive on stage after winning the Game of the Year award at the Game Developers Choice Awards 2026

Sandfall's debut title, Clair Obscur: Expedition 33, was released on 24 April 2025. Set in a dark fantasy Belle Époque-inspired universe, it follows the members of Expedition 33 as they set out to destroy the Paintress, a mysterious entity causing the yearly Gommage, which results in those at or above an ever-decreasing age being erased from existence. The game was met with universal acclaim from critics, high praise from western and Japanese developers alike, as well as remarkable commercial success.

By the date of its anniversary, Expedition 33 had become one of the most decorated titles in the medium's history; having won countless accolades, including the "Game of the Year" recognition from each of the industry's five major award ceremonies: the Golden Joystick Awards, the Game Awards, the D.I.C.E. Awards, the GDC Awards and the BAFTA Games Awards.

The members of the Sandfall team were knighted under the Ordre des Arts et des Lettres (Order of Arts and Letters) in February 2026 by the French Ministry of Culture in recognition of their achievements and their game's contribution to the promotion of French culture.

== Games developed ==
Year	Title	Platform(s)	Notes
2025	Clair Obscur: Expedition 33	Windows, PlayStation 5, Xbox Series X/S	
