= Kuro Games =

Chinese video game developer and publisher

- Native name: 库洛游戏
- Type: Private
- Founded: 2014 in Zhuhai, China
- Founders: Solon Lee (CEO)
- Headquarters: Guangzhou, China
- Brands: Punishing: Gray Raven; Wuthering Waves
- Number of employees: 1500 (2024)
- Subsidiaries: Kuro Technology (Hong Kong) Co., Ltd. Kuro Onroad
- Website: kurogames.net

Kuro Games (Chinese: 库洛游戏; pinyin: Kùluò Yóuxì) is a Chinese video game development and publishing company.

The company is best known as the creator of Punishing: Gray Raven, and Wuthering Waves.

== History ==
Kuro Games was formerly known as Zhuhai Kuro Technology Co. Ltd. and was founded in 2014, when it was located in Zhuhai. In 2015, Kuro Games relocated the company to Guangzhou and changed its name to Guangzhou Kuro Technology Co. The relocation and name change marked a new stage in the development of Kuro Games.

Kuro Games' first title, Twin Tail Battleground, was officially released in September 2016, but ceased service in 2018. In 2017, Kuro Games began development of Punishing: Gray Raven, a sci-fi action RPG praised by players. At that time, the company consisted of a small team of about 30 employees.

On October 23, 2019, Kuro Games received a capital injection of $30 million from Hero HootSuite (now Hero Hub), giving Hero a 32.5% stake in the company. This funding marked a turning point for Kuro Games, enabling the expansion of its team and production capabilities.

In 2021, Kuro Games launched a crossover event between Punishing: Gray Raven and Nier: Automata. That same year, the company also established a subsidiary in Hong Kong to support its growing operations.

In 2022, Kuro Games announced its new open-world action game, Wuthering Waves, and began limited technical testing in China. Producer Songlun Li (Solon Lee) was interviewed at the TapTap Developer Salon to discuss the game's development process.

On March 17, 2023, Tencent acquired a 14.33% stake in Kuro Games. Following the acquisition, ownership was updated to 37.07% held by Hero Hub, 14.33% by Tencent, and 48.59% by the founding team.

Wuthering Waves launched globally on May 22, 2024. The game garnered over 30 million pre-registrations before release and generated approximately $10 million in mobile revenue within its first five days. It ranked first on the iOS sales chart in South Korea and performed strongly in Japan and North America. By the end of 2024, its lifetime mobile revenue had surpassed $126 million. Meanwhile, Punishing: Gray Raven had also surpassed $159 million in mobile in-app purchases since its debut.

In November 2024, Tencent acquired an additional 37% stake from Hero Hub, increasing its total ownership of Kuro Games to 51.4%. This made Tencent the sole external shareholder. Kuro Games stated in an internal memo that the studio would continue to operate independently, similar to Tencent's hands-off approach with subsidiaries like Riot Games and Supercell. The company said this investment would provide long-term stability while supporting Kuro's creative autonomy.

In 2024, Kuro was ranked #16 on Pocket Gamer's "The Top 50 Mobile Game Makers of 2024".

In early 2025, Wuthering Waves expanded to new platforms. It launched on the PlayStation 5 on January 2, 2025, followed by a version 2.3 update and release on Steam in April. On March 25, 2025, Apple CEO Tim Cook made an appearance at a Kuro Games event to preview the game's macOS version, further demonstrating the title's global prominence.

In 2026, Kuro Games established its own animation studio, Kuro Onroad, marking the company's expansion into animation. The studio's first announced project was an animated series based on Wuthering Waves, titled Wuthering Waves: Elysium.

== Accolades ==
Year	Award	Category	Result	Ref.
2026	Thailand Game Awards	Best Game Publisher	Won	

== Games ==
- Twin Tail Battleground (released September 2016, discontinued)
- Punishing: Gray Raven (released December 2019)
- Wuthering Waves (released May 2024)
