= List of video games developed in Belgium =

This is a list of released and upcoming video games that are developed in Belgium. The list is sorted by game title, platform, year of release and their developer. This list does not include serious games.

Title	Platform	Year	Developer
Ziriax	Amiga	1989	The Whiz Kidz (Peter Verswyvelen, Erlend Robaye, Tomas Dahlgren, Kim Goossens)
Zarathrusta	Amiga	1991	The Whiz Kidz (Peter Verswyvelen, Erlend Robaye, Tomas Dahlgren)
Agony	Amiga	1992	Art&Magic
Deliverance	Amiga	1992	Devinart (Peter Verswyvelen, Kim Goossens, Bent Nielsen)
Atari Karts	Atari Jaguar	1995	Miracle Designs
LED Wars		1998	Larian Studios
Outcast	Windows	1999	Appeal
Divine Divinity	Windows	2002	Larian Studios
Beyond Divinity	Windows	2004	Larian Studios
Ketnet Kick		2004	Larian Studios
The Endless Forest	Windows	2006	Tales of Tales
Adventure Rock	Windows	2007	Larian Studios
The Graveyard	Windows, Android, IOS	2008	Tale of Tales
OFF	Microsoft Windows, Mac OS X, Nintendo Switch	2008	Unproductive Fun Time
Ketnet Kick 2		2008	Larian Studios
Divinity II	Windows	2009	Larian Studios
GulliLand		2009	Larian Studios
The Path	Windows	2009	Tale of Tales
Divinity: Dragon Commander	Windows	2013	Larian Studios
Empire: The Deck Building Strategy Game	IOS	2013	Crazy Monkey Studios
Divinity: Original Sin	Windows	2014	Larian Studios
Battle for Donetsk	Android	2015	LuGus Studios
Guns, Gore and Cannoli	Windows	2015	Crazy Monkey Studios
Woolfe - The Red Hood Diaries	Windows	2015	GriN Gamestudio
Divinity: Original Sin II	Windows	2017	Larian Studios
Ary and the Secret of Seasons	Windows	2020	Exiin
Sizeable	Windows	2021	Business Goose Studios
Baldur's Gate 3	Windows, PlayStation 5, macOS, Xbox Series X/S	2023	Larian Studios
