= Video games in Belgium =

This article is about the video game market and culture in Belgium.

== Consumer availability ==
=== Distribution ===
Distribution in Belgium is usually done by publishers that cover the entire Benelux, although some of the publishers' offices are located in Belgium. Since not every publisher has a separate office for the Benelux, certain publishers take care of multiple labels, including those of other publishers.

=== Rating ===
Belgium supports the PEGI rating system but there is no legislative basis. PEGI was developed and is owned by the Interactive Software Federation of Europe which is based in Brussels.

=== Sales ===
In 2011, the Belgian consumer bought 6.54 million games. More than 84% of those games were console games. The sales generated a revenue of 220 million euro, which means they stayed stable compared to 2010.

== Belgium's appearance in video games ==
=== Belgium as a setting ===
Belgium is not often used as an originally created setting for video games, although it does appear in some types of simulation games.

World War II games

The famous Battle of the Bulge is featured in the following video games:

- Battle of the Bulge, various wargames simulating the battle.
- Call of Duty: United Offensive, the American campaign is set during the Battle of the Bulge.
- Medal of Honor: European Assault, the final campaign is set at the start of the Battle.
- Bulge '44 (HPS Simulations) An operational level strategy wargame, covering many scenarios, both historic and alternative.
- Call of Duty: WWII, Battle of the Bulge, Ardennes map in multiplayer

Racing games

- Circuit de Spa-Francorchamps is a popular racing circuit. It's the host of the Belgian Grand Prix and has been featured in many Formula One games and other racing games like Need for Speed: Shift, Race Driver: Grid, Forza Motorsport 5 and Gran Turismo.

=== Belgian video game characters ===
- Anna from the game Valiant Hearts: The Great War is a nurse who was born in Ypres
- In most of the international sports games, such as the FIFA football games and olympic video games, teams or players from Belgium are featured.
- Phillipe Loren, one of Saints Row The Third's villains is of Belgian origin.
- Sens from the game Rainbow 6 Siege

=== Video games based on Belgian works ===
Many video games are based on Belgian comic books:

- XIII
- Video games based on The Adventures of Tintin
- Video games based on The Smurfs
- Largo Winch: Empire Under Threat
- Spirou
- Video games based on Lucky Luke

== Video game development ==
=== Representation ===
The Belgian Entertainment Association (BEA) is the organization that represents the interests of the music, video and video game industries in Belgium.

The Flemish Games Association (FLEGA) represents the Flemish video game industry, The Brussels-Capital Region Games Association (games.brussels) represents the Brussels video game industry, the Walloon Games Association (WALGA) represents the Walloon video game industry.

=== Game developers from Belgium ===
Also see external links.

There are 64 game developers registered with the Flemish Games Association. Some of the game development studios in Belgium include:

| Company | Location | Founded | Type |
|---|---|---|---|
| AIM Productions | Hove | 1994 | online games, custom games |
| Visual Impact | Brussels | 1994 | handheld games and localization |
| Larian Studios | Ghent | 1996 | core games and educational games |
| Cyborn B.V. | Antwerp | 1998 | multimedia, AV, VR, mobile and core games. Also co-devs. |
| Hyperion Entertainment | Brussels | 1999 | porting Windows games to Linux, Mac OS & Amiga OS |
| Nuclide | Antwerp | 2001 | casual and mobile games |
| Newfort | Ghent | 2002 (as Endrone) | online and mobile games |
| TerraNovita Software | Rumst | 2005 | indie games |
| Gabitasoft Interactive | Kapellen | 2006 | indie games |
| Neopica | Ghent | 2007 | casual games |
| Unproductive Fun Time | Brussels | 2007 | indie games |
| Playlane | Drongen | 2007 | custom games and serious games |
| Fishing Cactus | Mons | 2008 | mobile and downloadable games |
| Sakari Games | Antwerp | 2008 | game content |
| Balio Studio | Mons | 2009 | casual and core games (licensed properties) |
| CatLab Interactive | Ghent | 2009 | web and mobile games |
| PreviewLabs | Kontich | 2009 | rapid prototyping |
| The Artistocrats BV | Hasselt | 2009 | core games (strategy, wargames) |
| Vetasoft Studio | Mons | 2009 | social and mobile games |
| DAE Studios | Kortrijk | 2010 | 3D visualizations & serious games |
| Monkube | Brussels | 2010 | indie games and mobile games |
| Triangle Factory | Ghent | 2010 | virtual reality, augmented reality and mobile games |
| LuGus Studios | Genk | 2011 | serious games & experimental games |
| Rusty Bolt | Bruges | 2011 | indie games |
| Drag ON Slide | Mons | 2012 | serious games and mobile app |
| Firewolf Engineering | Hasselt | 2012 | game development & visualizations |
| Sileni Studios | Antwerp | 2012 | browser games |
| Pandora Technology | Belgium | 2012 | indie games |
| Abrakam Entertainment | Liège | 2013 | Indie games specialist in CCG games |
| Daoka | Gosselies | 2013 | motion games and core games |
| Quantum Game Studio | Ostend | 2013 | indie games |
| Bunnycopter | Leuven | 2014 | indie games |
| Glowfish Interactive | Kortrijk | 2014 | dev & co-dev: core games, VR & visualisations |
| Studio Raef | Turnhout | 2014 | indie games |
| eXiin | Brussels | 2015 | indie games |
| FrostyFroggs | Brussels | 2015 | indie games |
| Happy Volcano | Leuven | 2015 | indie games |
| Invisible Ink Studios | Wavre | 2015 | indie games |
| Pajama Llama Games | Ghent | 2015 | indie games |
| God As A Cucumber | Kortrijk | 2016 | game development & visualization |
| Cybernetic Walrus | Antwerp | 2017 | Indie games. Co-dev: graphics, AR/VR/XR. Training provider. |
| Warcave Games | Geel | 2017 | core games (strategy) |
| Get Up Games BVBA | Sint-Denijs-Westrem | 2018 | online games |
| Mantis Games | Ghent | 2018 | Core games. Co-dev, porting, VR. |
| Salty Lemon Entertainment | Antwerp | 2018 | exergames |
| CaptureAge | Mechelen | 2019 | Spectating tools, co-dev |
| like Charlie | Bruges | 2019 | indie games (adventures) |
| MoonMonster Studios | Kortrijk | 2019 | game development |
| Elivard SRL | Liège | 2021 | core games (city-builder/strategy) |
| Slappy Inc. | Kortrijk | 2021 | VR, AR projects and indie games |
Based outside Belgium
| Fresh3D S.A.R.L. | Pornichet (French studio) | 2004 | indie games and game services |

=== Defunct game developers ===
| Company | Founded | Ended | Notes |
|---|---|---|---|
| 10Tacle Studios Belgium | 2001 | 2008 | Founded as elseWhere Entertainment, acquired by German publisher, 10Tacle Studios AG, in 2005. Filed for bankruptcy in August 2008. |
| AMA Studios | 2009 | 2013 | fused with key people from Appeal to form Daoka |
| Appeal | 1995 | 2002 | core games |
| Bazookas | 2012 | 2022 | serious, educational, AR/VR and entertainment games. Inactive in 2020. Website down after 2022. |
| Belle Productions | 1996 | 2011 | serious games and advergames |
| Edisys SCRL | 1993 | 1995 | core, shareware games. Parent of game firm, Copysoft. Games & Magic Touch label likely sold to MA, US IT service firm, American Computer Technologies. |
| Hellion Cat | 2016 | 2020 | indie games |
| Hippo Point Interactive | 2008 | 2010 | filed for bankruptcy |
| Tale of Tales | 2002 | 2016 | liquidated |

=== Game publishers from Belgium ===
| Company | Location | Founded | Type |
|---|---|---|---|
| Big Ben Interactive Belgium | Tubize | 1992 (as Atoll Soft) | publishing and accessory distribution |
| Clever Trickster Studio SRL | Namur | 2022 | publisher, dev & co-dev |
| I-Illusions SPRL | Brussels | 2011 | publisher & dev: indie games |
| Oro Interactive | Aalst | 2020 | marketing & publishing support |
| Rogueside NV | Geel | 2010 | publisher & dev: indie games. Ex-Crazy Monkey Studios (2010-2020). |
| Transposia | Ghent | 1994 | localization & edutainment |

== Games developed in Belgium ==
- Adventure Rock
- Ary and the Secret of Seasons
- Baldur's Gate III
- Beyond Divinity
- Divine Divinity
- Divinity II: Ego Draconis
- Divinity II: Flames of Vengeance
- Divinity II: The Dragon Knight Saga
- Divinity: Dragon Commander
- Divinity: Original Sin
- Divinity: Original Sin II
- EXR (app)
- Hyperball Racing
- Outcast
- Sunset
- The Endless Forest
- The Graveyard
- The Path
- Woolfe: The Red Hood Diaries

== Education ==
=== University college ===
| Program | School | City | Degree |
|---|---|---|---|
| Digital Arts & Entertainment | Howest | Kortrijk | Bachelor |
| Bachelor en Techniques Infographiques (Video Games) | Haute Ecole Albert Jacquard | Namur | Bachelor |
| Communication and mediadesign, profile game art & design | LUCA | Genk | Master |

=== Other ===
Syntra LIMBURG offers multiple video game courses.

== Media ==
=== Print media ===
| Magazine | Publisher | Since |
|---|---|---|
| Gameplay (formerly known as PC Gameplay) | Tarsonis | 1994 |
| Officieel PlayStation Magazine | Think Media | 1996 |
| 9lives (formerly known as Gunk) | T.Vgas | 2004 |
| Chief | Think Media | 2007 |

=== Television ===
==== Programs ====
| Title | Channel | Since |
|---|---|---|
| Gamepower | JIM | 1996 |
| Gametown | TMF | 2010 |

==== Defunct Programs ====
| Title | Channel | From | Until |
|---|---|---|---|
| Shrimp tv | TMF | 2001 | 2003 |
| GUNK TV | TMF and VT4(from 2008) | 2004 | 2009 |
| Luna Park | RTBF | 1993 | 1996 |

==== Defunct Channels ====
- GUNKtv

=== Online media ===
- eurogamer.be
- RTBF iXPé
- 9lives.be
- Sensei Gaming
- Les Players Du Dimanche
- N-Gamz
- 4WeAreGamers
- GameBrain
- Belgian Games Industry (Companies list)
- Belgian Game Industry Directory
