= Divinity (disambiguation) =

Divinity refers to the property or state of being a deity or godlike.

Divinity may also refer to:

- Divinity (academic discipline), the academic study of theology and religious ministry at a divinity school, university and seminary
- Divinity (confectionery), type of confectionery
- Divinity school, academic school attached to a university for the study of divinity

== Film and television ==
- Divinity (film), 2023 film directed by Eddie Alcazar
- Divinity (TV channel), a Spanish television channel owned by Mediaset España

== Music ==
- Divinities: Twelve Dances with God, a 1995 album by Ian Anderson
- Divinity (band), a Canadian heavy metal band
- Divinity, a 2004 album by Altaria
- "Divinity", a 1996 song by Single Cell Orchestra from their eponymous album
- "Divinity", a 2002 song by The Future Sound of London from The Isness
- "Divinity", a 2014 song by Porter Robinson from Worlds

== People ==
- Divinity (drag queen), Italian drag queen
- Michael Divinity (born 1997), American football player

== Video games ==
- Divinity, a video game series of role-playing games from Larian Studios
  - Divine Divinity (2002)
  - Beyond Divinity (2004)
  - Divinity II (2009)
  - Divinity: Dragon Commander (2013)
  - Divinity: Original Sin (2014)
  - Divinity: Original Sin 2 (2017)
  - Divinity (TBA)

== Other ==
- Divinity (comics), a graphic novel and superhero created by Matt Kindt

== See also ==
- Divine (disambiguation)
