= Divide =

Divide or Divider may refer to:

== Mathematics and technology ==
- Division (mathematics)
- Divides, usually known as divisor
- Divider caliper or compass, a caliper
- Frequency divider, a circuit that divides the frequency of a clock signal

== Geography ==
- Drainage divide, a line separating two drainage basins
  - Great Divide Basin, in Wyoming

== Places ==
- Divide, Saskatchewan, Canada
- Divide, Colorado, community
- Divide, Illinois, an unincorporated community
- Divide, Montana, a rural community
- Divide, Oregon, an unincorporated community
- Divide, West Virginia, an unincorporated community
- Divide County, North Dakota
- Divider, a central reservation in Bangladesh

== Music ==
- ÷ (album), a 2017 album by Ed Sheeran
- "Divide", a song by All That Remains from The Order of Things
- "Divide", a song by Bastille from Doom Days
- "Divide", a song by Disturbed from Indestructible
- "Divide", a song by Vision of Disorder from Vision of Disorder
- Divides, album by The Virginmarys 2016
- The Divide, album by Tom Waits and Scott Vestal 2011
- "Divider", a song by Scott Weiland from the album 12 Bar Blues (album), 1998
- Divider, as in Schenkerian music analysis, a consonant subdivision of a consonant interval

== See also ==
- Continental divide (disambiguation)
- Div (disambiguation)
- Divided (disambiguation)
- Division (disambiguation)
- Division sign (÷)
- The Divide (disambiguation)
- Vertical line (dividing line)
