= Worth Dying For =

Worth Dying For may refer to:

- The former name of Fearless BND, American Christian band
- Worth Dying For (album), 2008 album by the above
- Worth Dying For (novel), 2010 novel by Lee Child
- Worth Dying For (Marshall book), 2016 book on flags by Tim Marshall
