= Div =

Div or DIV may refer to:

== Science and technology ==
- Division (mathematics), the mathematical operation that is the inverse of multiplication
- Div(X), the group of Weil divisors on an integral locally Noetherian scheme X
- <span> and <div>, HTML tags that implement generic elements
- div, a C mathematical function
- Divergence, a mathematical operation in vector calculus
- Days in vitro, for example see Cultured neuronal network
- Desquamative inflammatory vaginitis, an uncommon acute inflammation of the vagina; see Vulva disease
- &div;, the HTML code for the division sign

== Other uses ==
- Diversity Immigrant Visa, a United States congressionally mandated lottery program for receiving a United States Permanent Resident Card
- 504 (number) (DIV), in Roman numerals
- Div (demon), a demon in Middle Eastern mythology
- Divisi or div., a music term used in orchestral scores
- Div, a character in the Penny Arcade
- Divorce, a process in which a married couple breaks up and their marriage license is nullified

== See also ==
- Master of Divinity (M.Div.), a professional and academic degree
- Division (disambiguation)
- Divide (disambiguation)
- Divine (disambiguation)
- Divinity (disambiguation)
- D4 (disambiguation), or D.IV
- Dievas (Latgalian: Dīvs), the primordial supreme god in Baltic mythology
- Palace of Sporting Games "Uralochka" (DIVS; Russian: Дворец игровых видов спорта «Уралочка»; ДИВС), Yekaterinburg, Russia
