= Superia (video game) =

2009 video game

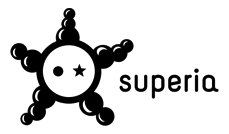
- Developer(s): Larian Studios, BBC
- Publisher(s): NRK
- Platform(s): Microsoft Windows
- Genre(s): Adventure game

Superia is an adventure game based on Adventure Rock and Ketnetkick launched January 2009 by NRK. In the game players could meet KIM, a multifunctional droide-friend, who guided them through the game. The game was discontinued in November 2010 and shut down on 15 April 2011.

Superia has since the autumn 2009 also been seen on NRK's TV channel for children, NRK Super as a weekend game tips and entertainment for children in the age of 6–12 years. The presenter is Stian Presthus.
