= Project Shadowglass =

Upcoming retro-styled adventure game

- Developer: Starhelm Studios
- Publisher: Starhelm Studios
- Engine: Godot
- Platform: Windows
- Genres: RPG, Simulator
- Mode: Single-player

Project Shadowglass is an upcoming role-play adventure simulator video game in retro style, developed and published by Starhelm Studios, a studio based in North Carolina. The project attracted attention through its unique pixelated graphic style and has been described as "a love letter" to classic immersive sims like Thief, Deus Ex and System Shock. Project Shadowglass alpha demo is planned releasing in 2026 on Steam.

== Gameplay ==
The player controls a struggling thief in a dark fantasy world, mysteriously tasked by an anonymous source to "acquire" ancient artifacts hidden across the realm. To succeed, the player needs to study patrols and magical defences, relying on their weapons and tools to pull off heists. If the player will be caught, they will face "lasting consequences".

== Reception ==
Some users didn't believe in the existence of the game, thinking that it is only a GIF concept made to collect views or an AI-generated hoax, but Starhelm Studios stated that the project is fully real and doesn't use any AI. Reviewers widely noted the feeling of nostalgia and well-known aesthetics used in the game and "revolutionary" 3D pixel art graphics. The creator of Baldur's Gate 3, Swen Vincke, showed enthusiastic support towards Project Shadowglass on Twitter.
