= Live Riot =

Live album by Worth Dying For (now Fearless BND)
- Released: February 7, 2012
- Venue: Ammunition Conference in Modesto, California
- Genre: Contemporary worship
- Length: 168:49
- Label: Ammunition
- Producer: Henry Seeley

Worth Dying For (now Fearless BND) chronology
Love Riot (2011)	Live Riot (2012)	We Are Fearless (2017)

Singles from Live Riot
- 1. "Savior" Released: January 3, 2012

Professional ratings
Review scores
Source	Rating
Jesus Freak Hideout	3.5/5 stars
Christian Music Zine	(4.25/5)
New Release Tuesday	4.5/5 stars

Live Riot is the first live album from the Modesto, CA based contemporary worship band Worthy Dying For (now Fearless BND), released by Ammunition Records in February 2012.

== Track listing ==
=== Standard edition ===
1. "Rebuild" (featuring Jeremy Johnson) – 2:47
2. "Arise" (featuring Rochelle Leguern) – 3:28
3. "Never Look Back" (featuring Sean Loche) – 4:12
4. "Freedom Is Rising" (featuring Dalisha Turner) – 3:09
5. "One Love" (featuring Christy Johnson) – 3:58
6. "Love Riot" (featuring Sean Loche & Christy Johnson) – 3:30
7. "The World Can't Take It Away" (featuring Christy Johnson) – 3:43
8. "Risen from the Grave" (featuring Sean Loche) – 9:10
9. "Closer" (featuring Deanna Joven & Nick Morris) – 5:58
10. "All I Want (Closer Reprise)" [featuring Deanna Joven] – 5:44
11. "Higher" (featuring Christy Johnson) – 5:25
12. "Send Your Glory Down" (featuring Sean Loche & Sarah Agbayani) – 5:36
13. "Power of Your Love" (featuring Christy Johnson) – 7:00
14. "Spirit of God" (featuring Nick Morris & Christy Johnson) – 6:36
15. "Light a Fire" (featuring Christy Johnson) – 5:23
16. "Taking Back" (featuring Sean Loche) – 4:02
17. "Savior" (featuring Christy Johnson) – 3:52
18. "Rebuild (Radio Edit)" [featuring Jeremy Johnson] – 2:49

=== Bonus tracks ===
1. Album Story (Video) – 5:39
2. "The World Can't Take It Away (Video)" – 3:45
3. "Light a Fire (Video)" – 4:44
4. "Love Riot (Video)" – 3:30
5. "One Love (Video)" – 4:00
6. "Rebuild (Video)" – 3:13
7. "Risen from the Grave (Video)" – 8:23
8. Have the Keys (Video) – 48:48

== Chart performance ==
Live Riot reached #38 on the Billboard Christian Albums chart.
