= Prisoners of Geography =

Book by Tim Marshall

Prisoners of Geography: Ten Maps That Tell You Everything You Need to Know About Global Politics
- First edition
- Author: Tim Marshall
- Original title: Prisoners of Geography: Ten Maps That Tell You Everything You Need to Know About Global Politics
- Language: English
- Subject: Geopolitics
- Genre: Non-fiction
- Publisher: Elliott & Thompson (UK); Scribner (US)
- Publication date: 2015
- ISBN: 978-1-78396-243-3
- Followed by: The Power of Geography

Prisoners of Geography: Ten Maps That Tell You Everything You Need to Know About Global Politics is a 2015 non-fiction book about geopolitics by the British author and journalist Tim Marshall.

The author has also released a children's illustrated version of this book in 2019, Prisoners of Geography - Our World Explained in 12 Simple Maps, nominated for Waterstones Book of the Year. The Power of Geography, a sequel, was released in 2021. In 2025, a revised 10-year anniversary edition was released, updating the book's coverage to include geopolitical developments up to and through that year.

== Summary ==
Prisoners of Geography is a set of observations about past and present geopolitics seen through the lens of geography. Through various global examples, Tim Marshall challenges the widely held belief that technology is allowing humans to overcome the constraints and vulnerabilities imposed by geography and to render it irrelevant to geopolitics and conflicts. Marshall makes the case for putting the ‘geo’ back in ‘geopolitics’, arguing that geography often gets written out of discussions and analyses of historic and contemporary conflicts and stories of state development.

Prisoners of Geography covers the geopolitical situations in several vital regions of the world, including Russia, China, the United States, Europe, the Arab World, South Asia (mainly focusing on the geopolitical anomalies of India and Pakistan), Africa, Japan and Korea, Latin America, and the Arctic Ocean (the latter mainly to focus on the geopolitics of the Arctic resources race).

Prisoners of Geography describes the impact geography can have on international affairs, offering an explanation for such geopolitical events as Russia's annexation of Crimea (based on Russia's need to retain access to warm-water ports) and China's actions in Tibet (based on its interest in enforcing its border with India).

Informed by his first-hand experiences of conflict in areas from the Balkans to Syria, Tim Marshall explores how a better understanding of geography is crucial if we are to fully understand the past, present, and future behaviours of nation states. Prisoners of Geography, through examples such as Russia and the Arctic, explores how geography is a deciding factor in processes of peace as well as war, analysing the ways in which an abundance or lack of resources can simultaneously stimulate and constrain states’ economic development.

The author uses the example of the Middle East, specifically Syria, to demonstrate just how harmful and disastrous Western misunderstandings of topography can be. The author describes how these instances of geographical ignorance as well as an over-reliance on technology can play a decisive role in the outcome of conflicts.

In his conclusion, the author reiterates the importance of geography and the central role that an understanding of physical landscape must play if we are to understand future conflict, particularly since he believes technology will see conflicts advancing into space as claims are made over yet-unclaimed areas.

== Reception ==
The book was a New York Times Best Seller and #1 Sunday Times bestseller.

Writing in the American Association of Geographers' Review of Books, Douglas Webster concluded, "The book has obvious appeal, though, corroborated by its success to date, as an easy-to-read, informative primer on contemporary geographic dynamics from a geopolitical perspective," while noting that it would be criticised by exponents of global studies, who see more influence from sociological than geographical factors.

The Berlin geographer Hans-Dietrich Schultz argues that Prisoners of Geography is based on old-geographical spatial arguments of 19th-century regional geography, which completely contradict the current state of geographical research. He criticises Marshall's expositions on the geopolitical relationship of Russia to Ukraine: "The fact that current Russian politics also has something to do with Russia's social conditions, its savage capitalism and its kleptocratic elite, remains hidden behind the penetratingly invoked spatial determinism, which must be recognised as a 'decisive factor in the course of human history'. In contrast, it should be noted: Physical objects, like Marshall's eternal mountains, plains and rivers, do not will anything of themselves. They do not act, dictate anything, force anything, seduce anything and take no sides of their own accord".
