= Swen Vincke =

Belgian video game designer, programmer and director

- Vincke at the Game Developers Conference in 2024
- Born: Swen Johan Vincke; 30 May 1972 (age 54); Bruges, Belgium
- Education: Ghent University
- Occupations: Video game designer, programmer, director
- Years active: 1996–present
- Known for: Divinity, Baldur's Gate 3
- Title: Founder and CEO of Larian Studios
- Children: 4

Swen Johan Vincke (/ˈsvɛn ˈvɪŋkə/; Dutch pronunciation: [ˈsʋɛn ˈjo:ɦɑn ˈvɪŋkə]; born 30 May 1972) is a Belgian video game designer, programmer and director. He is the founder and CEO of the video game company Larian Studios, where he has led the development of the Divinity series and Baldur's Gate 3.

== Early life ==
Vincke was born on 30 May 1972 in Bruges, Belgium, to Robert Vincke and Josiane Goderis. He grew up in De Panne, where his parents ran a restaurant. He also has an older sister. Vincke developed an interest in programming, arcade and computer games, as well as basketball at a young age. He was particularly fascinated by Dungeons & Dragons and role-playing video games such as the Ultima series, which became inspirations for his own games in the future. Vincke made his first game, which was a hunting simulator, for his father, while still at school. He attended Ghent University, graduating with a degree in Computer Science. He was originally interested in doing speech recognition, but decided to devote himself to making video games when he saw how much fun people were having with his projects.

== Career ==
Vincke founded Larian Studios in 1996. As CEO and creative director, he plays a central role in the company and the development of the games. He was the project leader and lead programmer of Larian's first published game The L.E.D. Wars (1997), followed by the first two installments in the Divinity series, award-winning Divine Divinity (2002) and its sequel Beyond Divinity (2004).

Vincke was also responsible for the design of KetnetKick (2004), an educational video game developed for Flemish children's channel Ketnet. This game has later seen licensed implementations by several other children's channels, such as the British channel CBBC (titled Adventure Rock), French channel Jeunesse TV (titled GulliLand), and Norwegian channel NRK (titled Superia). Later he led the creation of a series of new educational games called Monkey Labs (2009) and Monkey Tales (2011).

Vincke served as the director, game designer and script contributor on Divinity II, first released in 2009, with the final version released in 2012. Around that time he came to the decision to make Larian a self-publishing company. He then oversaw the production of the spin-off Divinity: Dragon Commander, released in 2013.

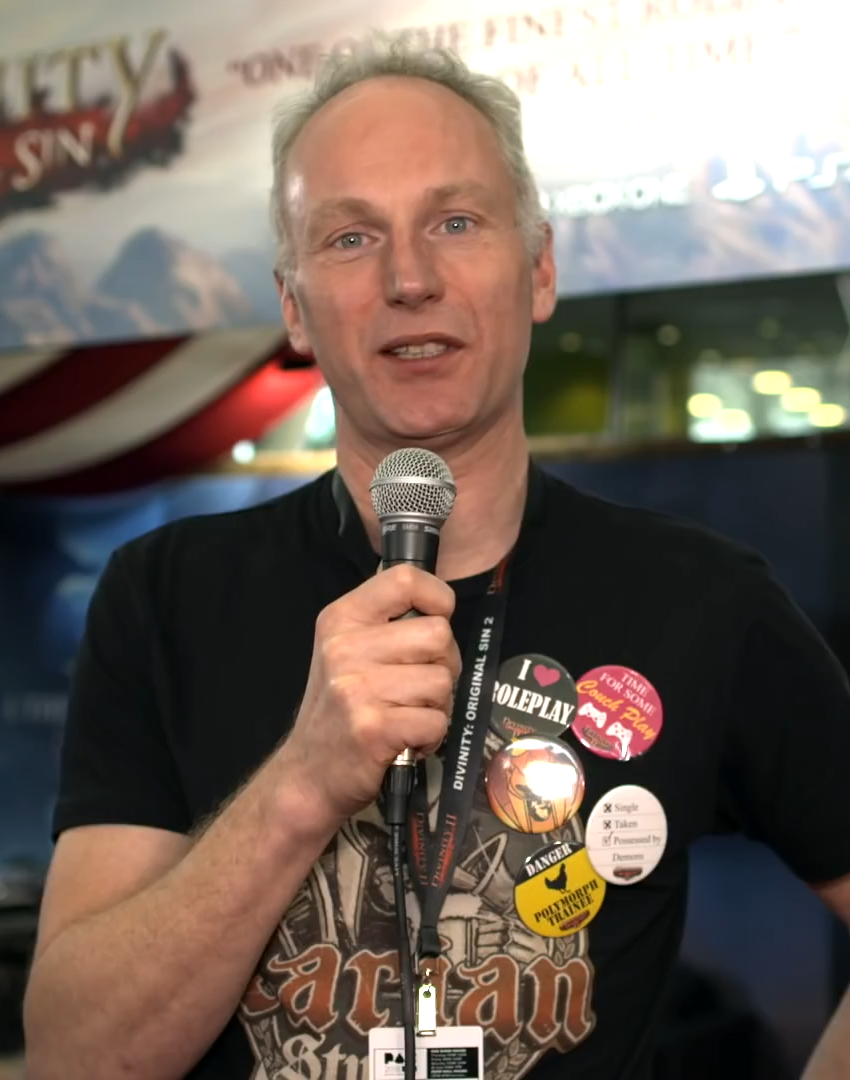
Swen Vincke in 2018

At the same time, Vincke worked on the fourth installment in the Divinity main series, titled Divinity: Original Sin, which was released in 2014. The game became a critical and commercial success. He subsequently directed its sequel Divinity: Original Sin II, released in 2017, which was hailed as one of the best role-playing games of all time.

After this, Vincke has led the development of Baldur's Gate 3 as its creative director. The game was released in August 2023 to universal acclaim, winning over 200 Game of the Year awards.

In 2020, Vincke became the first recipient of the Belgian Lifetime Achievement Award for his career and influence on the Belgian games industry. In 2023, Variety included him in the index of the 500 most influential business leaders shaping the global media industry.

== Personal life ==
Vincke lives in Ghent with his wife and four children. In addition to his native Flemish, he speaks fluent French and English.

== Public image ==
In December 2025, Jason Schreier of Bloomberg published an interview in which Vincke described how Larian Studios was using generative AI for placeholder text, and concept art references, among other things. The comments led to immediate and widespread backlash from the gaming community and gaming media. Many fans were disappointed and outraged, and Luke Plunkett of Aftermath noted that the comments suggested Vincke didn't actually understand how art was made at Larian. Vincke responded to the backlash, publishing a statement on IGN noting that he was not planning on releasing a game with any AI components, or firing workers only to replace them with AI. Vincke later promised that Larian would do an AMA ("Ask Me Anything") in the new year to clarify aspects of the development process at the studio.

== Ludography ==
| Year | Title | Role(s) |
|---|---|---|
| 1997 | The L.E.D. Wars | Project leader, programming, video production, voices, level editing |
| 2002 | Divine Divinity | Project leader, lead programmer, engine programming |
| 2004 | Beyond Divinity | Project leader, lead programmer |
| 2004 | KetnetKick | Game lead |
| 2009 | Divinity II: Ego Draconis | Director, game design, additional programming, script contributions |
| 2010 | Divinity II: Flames of Vengeance | Director, game design, additional programming, script contributions |
| 2013 | Divinity: Dragon Commander | Director, game design, script contributions |
| 2014 | Divinity: Original Sin | Director, game design, story |
| 2017 | Divinity: Original Sin II | Director |
| 2023 | Baldur's Gate 3 | Director |
| TBA | Divinity | Director |
