= The Divide =

The Divide may refer to:

== Books ==
- The Divide (novel), a 1980 alternate history novel by William Overgard
- The Divide, novel by Nicholas Evans 2005
- The Divide trilogy, a series of novels by Elizabeth Kay, or the first book in the trilogy
- The Divide: American Injustice in the Age of the Wealth Gap, a 2014 book by Matt Taibbi
- The Divide: A Brief Guide to Global Inequality and its Solutions, a 2018 book by Jason Hickel

== Film and TV ==
- The Divide (2011 film), a nuclear-apocalyptic fiction film by Xavier Gens
- The Divide (2015 film), a documentary film by Katharine Round
- The Divide (2021 film), a/k/a La Fracture, a drama film by Catherine Corsini
- The Divide (TV series), a 2014 WeTV series

== Music ==
- The Divide, album by Tom Waits and Scott Vestal 2011
- "The Divide", a song by Miss Kittin from On the Road
- "The Divide", a song by Tenacious D from The Pick of Destiny

== Video games ==
- The Divide: Enemies Within, a 1996 video game
- The Divide, the location of the Lonesome Road expansion for the 2010 video game Fallout: New Vegas

== See also ==
- Divide (disambiguation)
- The Divided, an English metalcore band
