= Divine Divinity =

2002 video game

- Developer: Larian Studios
- Publisher: cdv Software Entertainment
- Director: Swen Vincke
- Programmer: Swen Vincke
- Writers: Darren Evans; Patrick Grieser; Gillian Pearce; Damon Wilson
- Composer: Kirill Pokrovsky
- Series: Divinity
- Platforms: Windows, OS X
- Release: Windows: GER: 2 August 2002; EU: 13 September 2002; NA: 19 September 2002; OS X: WW: 15 November 2013
- Genre: Action role-playing
- Mode: Single-player

Divine Divinity is an action role-playing game developed by Larian Studios and published by cdv Software Entertainment for Microsoft Windows, which was released in August 2002. It has three sequels, Beyond Divinity, Divinity II, and Divinity: Original Sin II. It also has a prequel, Divinity: Original Sin, and a spin-off, Divinity: Dragon Commander. The game was released for Mac OS X on 15 November 2013.

== Gameplay ==
While exploring a dimly-lit sewer system, the male warrior character runs into a massed attack of lizardmen warriors and assassins. The character statistics and equipment windows are open. In the upper left is the auto-map window.

Divine Divinity is an action role-playing game with a top-down camera angle and controlled primarily through the mouse. Its gameplay is focused on hack and slash combat and has significant similarities to Diablo, with features such as random equipment generation and a wide set of skills organized into archetypes.

Unlike Diablo, Divine Divinity also features a significant amount of traditional computer role-playing game elements such as branching conversation trees, non-combat skills like lockpicking, pickpocketing, and bartering, and a reputation and disposition system to track how NPCs will react to the player.

The game also incorporates point-and-click elements which allows the player to move and manipulate certain items in the world. For example, a barrel can be clicked and dragged to move it, revealing that a key is underneath it, or a hay bale can be clicked to spread it out and provide a bed for the player to rest.

The skill system, which would become a staple in later Divinity games, allows a character of any starting class to learn any skill. The system of attributes is also open-ended, allowing the player to develop their character in any direction regardless of their initial class.

== Plot ==
Two thousand years before the game begins, those who sat on the Council of Seven in the land of Rivellon sacrificed themselves in the fight against a group of treacherous magicians, who had passed over to the dark side of magic. To remember the Council of Seven, the "Divine Order" was founded to pass on the knowledge of the wise men to the next generations.

At the beginning of the game, the player wakes up in a house in Aleroth, a town of healers. It is revealed that Mardaneus, leader of the town, has gone crazy, and the player is asked to help by traveling into the catacombs beneath the town to stop the undead mage Thelyron, who is driving Mardaneus mad. Once Thelyron is put to rest, Mardaneus appears to bring the player back to the surface.

With the crisis in Aleroth resolved, the player leaves to explore, and is ambushed by a dragon rider, but is saved by the appearance of the wizard Zandalor, who explains that the player is one of three Marked Ones, and asks the player to meet him at an inn. Shortly thereafter, the other two Marked Ones are discovered dead, leaving only the player. The player is invited to come to Castle Stormfist, home of Duke Janus, a young noble who claims to be the Divine, a messiah prophesied to protect Rivellon against the summoning of the demon Chaos. The player is forced to do menial tasks for Janus, and no matter what they do, they end up in a dungeon, and have to fight their way out.

Once free, Zandalor takes the player to where the Council of Seven met, and explains that to find the real Divine, the heirs to the Council of Seven have to be brought together. In doing so, the player learns more about the way events have been manipulated by the Black Ring, the evil organization dedicated to bringing the demon Chaos back to Rivellon; the orcs have been goaded into attacking humans, and the elves and dwarves are poised at the brink of war, until the player reveals the manipulation going on.

As the new council members assemble to complete the ritual that will turn the player into the Divine, Duke Janus appears, revealing himself to be the Demon of Lies, in league with the Black Ring and seeking to summon Chaos. The council is attacked and a number of the members slain, along with the player. The player returns to life, however, with new abilities as the Divine, and is able to reach the fortress where the Black Ring is summoning Chaos. The Divine defeats Janus, but finds a baby who was picked to be the vessel of Chaos, lying on the summoning altar, and carries the baby out in their arms.

== Development ==
An early version of the isometric game engine was used by Larian Studios for its very first project, Unless: The Treachery of Death, in 1996. Larian Studios was about to sign a publishing deal with Atari, but it didn't come to be as Atari announced its departure from the PC platform. Soon after Attic Entertainment Software joined Larian and Unless was turned into The Lady, the Mage and the Knight, a game set in the universe of The Dark Eye. Due to financial problems between the two development studios and its publisher, Infogrames, The Lady, the Mage and the Knight was canceled in July 1999.

Divine Divinity development started in early 1999 codenamed Project C and later Divinity: The Sword of Lies. The publisher forced Larian to change the name to Divine Divinity from Divinity: The Sword of Lies.

The game was re-released in 2004 along with Beyond Divinity as a part of Beyond Divinity: Deluxe Edition. In 2009 a remastered version of Divine Divinity was released as a download on GOG.com, the main change being support for higher resolutions.

In 2012 it was noticed that the source code of the "remastered" version 1.4 was lost because of a backup failure. Later released Digital Distribution versions are therefore based an earlier version of the source code, containing some fixes from the 1.32 hotfix (such as Finnigan's magic lockpicks), but not all bugfixes in the last retail version 1.34a.

== Reception ==
Reception

Aggregate score
Aggregator	Score
Metacritic	79/100

Review scores
Publication	Score
Computer Gaming World	3.5/5
Game Informer	7.75/10
GameSpot	8.6/10
GameSpy	4/5
GameZone	7.8/10
IGN	8.5/10
PC Format	68%
PC Gamer (US)	84%
PC Zone	85%
X-Play	4/5

The game received "generally favorable reviews" according to the review aggregation website Metacritic. GameSpot opined that there is "much more to Divine Divinity than its impressive graphics and music and its combination of hack-and-slash action and pure role-playing, and that says a lot for the game."

IGN declared, in summary, that "Divine Divinity is a very easy game to get into and enjoy. It lacks anything memorable, like the party NPCs with minds and dialog of their own in Baldur's Gate II: Shadows of Amn, but it has atmosphere, tons of quests, and a great deal of variety to offer. Above all, it's plain fun to play, to develop your character and find ever-better weapons and armor, to face the foe around the next corner. And who knows...? With BioWare's assets tied up in light sabers and Black Isle Studios working on a game that has no strategic pause mode, perhaps Larian will step forward to carry the CRPG banner in the near future. We could do a lot worse."

Divine Divinity was a nominee for PC Gamer US's "2002 Best Roleplaying Game", GameSpy's "PC RPG Game of the Year", RPG Vault's "RPG of the Year" and GameSpot's "Best Role-Playing Game on PC" awards, but lost these prizes to Neverwinter Nights and The Elder Scrolls III: Morrowind. It was also a runner-up in GameSpot's "Best Music on PC" and "Best Game No One Played on PC" categories. However, Divine Divinity won RPG Vault's awards for "Surprise of the Year" and "Outstanding Achievement in Music"; the publication's editors wrote that its score "very proficiently supports the changing moods and locations in the game, never becoming either overwhelming or repetitive."
