= Tim Marshall (journalist) =

British journalist, author, and broadcaster

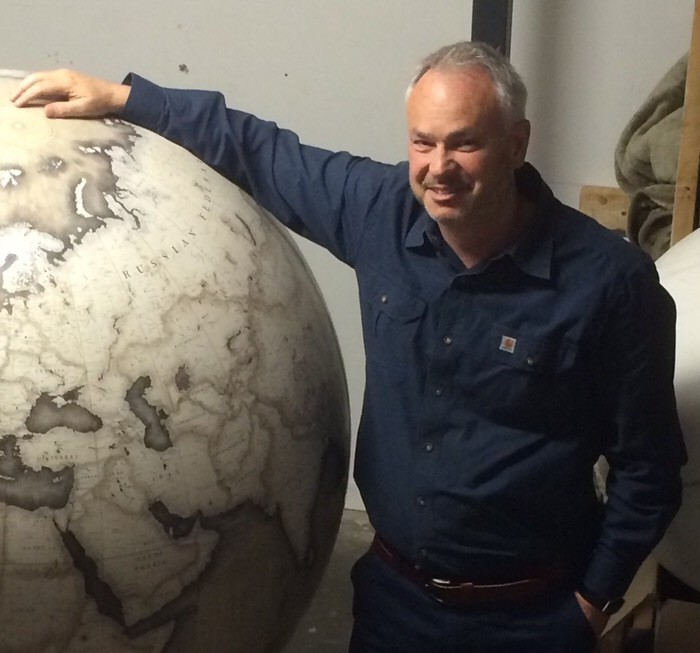
- Marshall in 2015
- Born: Timothy John Marshall; 1 May 1959 (age 67); England, United Kingdom
- Education: Prince Henry's Grammar School, Otley
- Occupations: Journalist, author, broadcaster
- Notable credit(s): Sky News; BBC; LBC; IRN
- Website: thewhatandthewhy.com

Timothy John Marshall (born 1 May 1959) is a British journalist, author, and broadcaster, specialising in foreign affairs and international diplomacy. Marshall is a guest commentator on world events for the BBC, Sky News and a guest presenter on LBC, and was formerly the diplomatic and also foreign affairs editor for Sky News.

He has written seven books including Prisoners of Geography – a New York Times Best Seller and #1 Sunday Times bestseller. He also released a children's illustrated version of this book in 2019, Prisoners of Geography: Our World Explained in 12 Simple Maps, nominated for Waterstones Book of the Year. Other titles include The Power of Geography a #2 Sunday Times bestseller; Shadowplay: The Inside Story Of Europe's Last War, and 2018 Sunday Times bestseller Divided: Why We’re Living In An Age Of Walls.

Marshall is founder and editor of news web platform thewhatandthewhy.com, a site for journalists, politicians, foreign affairs analysts, and enthusiasts to share their views on world news events.

== Education ==
Marshall was educated at Prince Henry's Grammar School, a state-funded comprehensive school in the market town of Otley, near Leeds, West Yorkshire.

== Career ==
Marshall began his journalistic career reporting for LBC and was their Paris Bureau Correspondent for three years. He has also reported for the BBC and has written for a number of national newspapers. He was also the longstanding Foreign Affairs Editor and then Diplomatic Editor for Sky News.

Over twenty-four years at Sky News, Marshall reported from thirty countries and covered the events of twelve wars. He has reported from Europe, the United States, (covering three US Presidential Elections), and Asia, as well as from the field in Bosnia, Croatia and Serbia during the Balkan wars of the 1990s. He spent the majority of the 1999 Kosovo crisis in Belgrade, where he was one of the few western journalists who stayed on to report from one of the main targets of NATO bombing raids. He was in Kosovo on the day NATO troops advanced into Pristina.

Marshall reported from the front line during the invasion of Afghanistan and spent time in Iraq, reporting on the country's transition to democracy. He has reported from Libya, Egypt, Syria and Tunisia during the uprisings across the Arab World. As Sky News Middle East Correspondent, based in Jerusalem, he covered Israel's Gaza disengagement in August 2005. He was also Sky News Europe Correspondent, heading up their Brussels news bureau and also regularly contributed to the channel's former World News Tonight international news bulletin (including as stand-in host).

Marshall's blog, 'Foreign Matters', was short-listed for the Orwell Prize 2010. In 2004 he was a finalist in the Royal Television Society's News Event category for his Iraq War coverage. He won finalist certificates in 2007, for a report on the Mujahideen, and in 2004 for his documentary 'The Desert Kingdom' which featured exclusive access to Crown Prince Abdullah and his palaces.

One of his most notable moments on Sky News involved a six-hour unbroken broadcast during the first Gulf War. He was the last journalist to interview Pakistan's Benazhir Bhutto ahead of her return from exile and subsequent assassination.

Marshall's book, Prisoners of Geography, was released in the UK in July 2015 and in the U.S. in October 2015. He continues to broadcast and comment on foreign affairs and is a regular guest on BBC, Sky News and on Monocle 24 Radio's 'Midori House'.

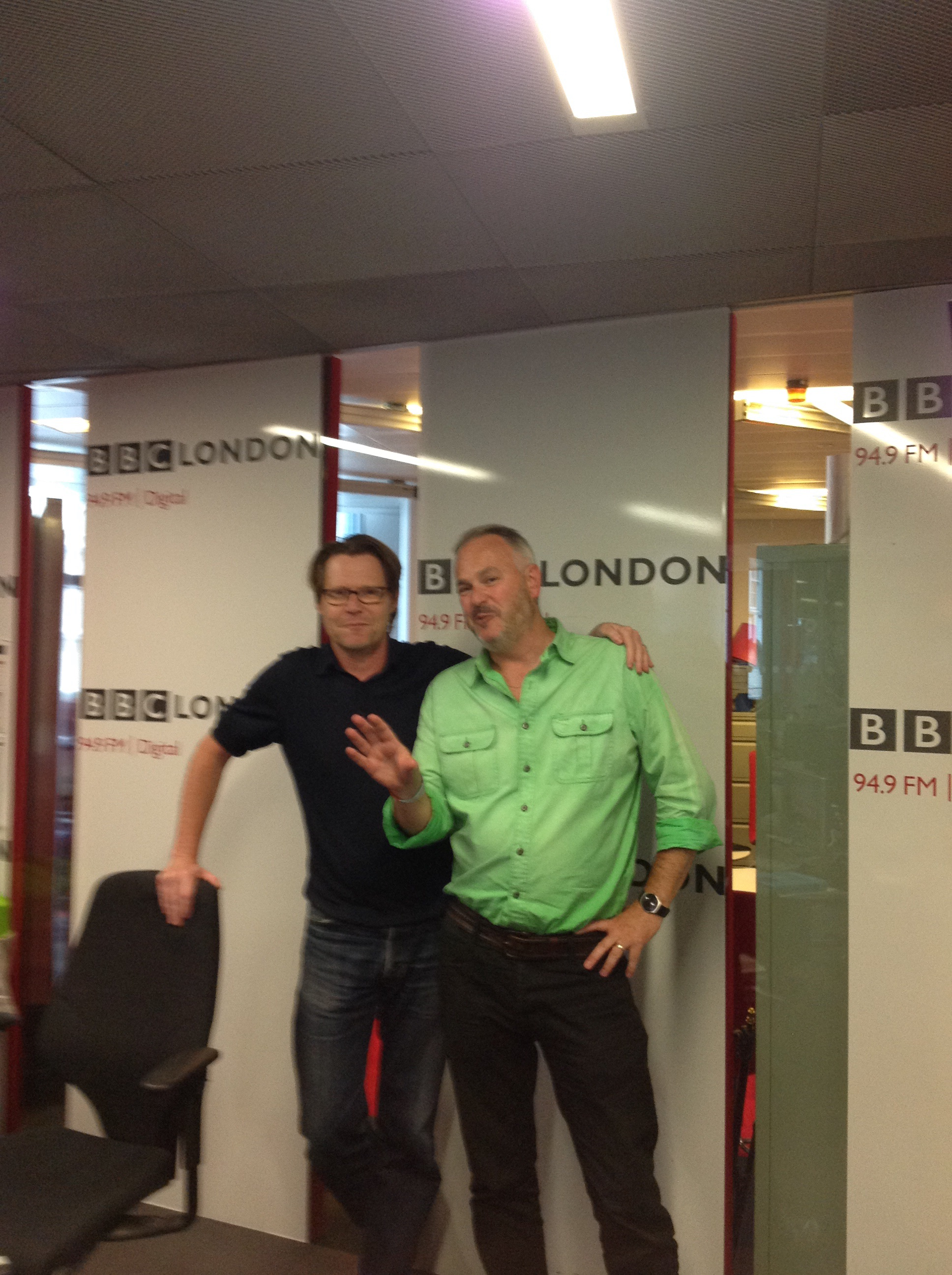
Marshall with Robert Elms, BBC London 94.9, August 2014. Interview about Marshall's book Dirty Northern B*st*rds

He is the founder and editor of thewhatandthewhy.com. Launched in February 2015, the site analyses world events and has contributions from writers from the world of politics and journalism.

== Personal life ==
Marshall is a supporter of Leeds United. In his book Shadowplay: The Inside Story of Europe's Last War, Marshall says that he was supporting Bayern Munich in the 1999 UEFA Champions League final against Manchester United because he was a Leeds United supporter.

== Publications ==
Marshall has written a number of books including:

- Dirty Northern B*st*rds – about the history of Britain's football chants (August 2014, Elliott & Thompson). The book was favourably reviewed in The Times, The Telegraph, The Sun and was "Book of the Week" in The Independent's sports section. It was dedicated to the memory of Sky News cameraman Mickey Deane, a longtime colleague and friend of Marshall's, who was shot dead in Cairo in August 2013.
- Shadowplay - Behind The Lines & Under Fire (The Inside Story Of Europe's Last War). A book which documents the downfall of Slobodan Milošević and contains Marshall's account of his experiences during the Yugoslav Wars. (Release: June 2019)

=== Politics of place series ===
- Prisoners of Geography is an international bestseller explaining how a country's geography affects their internal fortunes and international strategy. This book became the No. 1 Sunday Times best seller, a New York Times best seller and during August 2016 was Waterstones 'Non-fiction Book of the Month' & no. 1 best selling paperback. It made the MPs Summer 2015 Reading List and received favourable reviews both internationally and in the UK (including in The Evening Standard and Newsweek). (2015)
- Worth Dying For - The Power & Politics Of Flags - is a book which covers the symbolism, culture and history behind the world's flags. Published by Elliott & Thompson (2016)
- Divided - Why We're living in an Age of Walls (2018)
- The Power of Geography - Ten Maps That Reveal The Future Of Our World (2021)
- The Future of Geography - How Power and Politics in Space will Change our World. (Elliott and Thompson. Released April 2023)
