= Love Riot =

Studio album by Worth Dying For (now Fearless BND)
- Released: February 22, 2011
- Recorded: Modesto, California
- Genre: Alternative, contemporary worship, contemporary Christian, Christian rock, hardcore, electronic, dance
- Length: 62 minutes
- Label: Ammunition
- Producer: Henry Seeley

Worth Dying For (now Fearless BND) chronology
Worth Dying For (2008)	Love Riot (2011)	Live Riot (2012)

Professional ratings
Review scores
Source	Rating
Christianity Today	4/5 stars
Cross Rhythms	9/10 stars
Jesus Freak Hideout	3.5/5 stars
New Release Tuesday Staff Review	4/5 stars

Love Riot is the second album from the Modesto, CA based contemporary worship band Worth Dying for (now Fearless BND) released by Ammunition Records in February 2011.

== Track listing ==
1. Destroy (3:44)
2. Savior (2:51)
3. Love Riot (3:27)
4. Through Your Eyes (ft. Trevor McNevan of TFK) (3:13)
5. You're Alive (3:02)
6. Stir it Up (3:35)
7. Higher (4:46)
8. Glorify (6:50)
9. Power of Your Love (5:05)
10. (Reprise) (3:38)
11. Never Look Back (3:24)
12. No Love Greater (2:57)
13. Closer (ft. Henry Seeley) (5:33)
14. Take Me Away (5:18)
15. My Glorious (4:54)

== Chart performance ==
Love Riot debuted at #3 on the iTunes Christian and Gospel Charts and reached #48 on the Billboard magazine Christian Albums chart.

== Reception ==
The album was generally well received by Christian media publications. Christianity Today said, "even with vertical lyrics, the album could fit in easily with modern rock radio." Jesus Freak Hideout gave the album an overall positive review and said while the techno and industrial blends are more of an "acquired taste", the album is "right up your alley" if a person likes their worship "edgy." Cross Rhythms was very favorable of the album, giving it nine squares out of ten and stating that "apart from some slightly questionable theology in places, 'Love Riot' is an exceptional worship album."

=== Style ===
Love Riot was labeled under a variety of musical genres, including alternative worship, contemporary, hard rock, industrial, techno, synthpop, screamo, ballad/power ballad, and dance.
