= Divided (disambiguation) =

Divided refers to division (mathematics).

Divided may also refer to:

== Television ==
- Divided (British game show), a 2009–2010 game show
- Divided (American game show), a 2017–2018 U.S. version of the British show
- Divided (Indian game show), a 2018 Tamil-language game show
- "Divided" (Stargate Universe), an episode of Stargate Universe
- "Divided" (Arrow), an episode of Arrow

== Music ==
- The Divided, a British metal band
- Divided (EP), a 2010 EP by Benevolent
- "Divided" (song), a 1999 song by Tara MacLean
- "Divided", an instrumental by Linkin Park

== Books ==
- Divided (book), a 2018 non-fiction book by Tim Marshall

== See also ==
- Divided By (album), a 2011 album by Structures
