= Fear Not =

Studio album by Fearless BND
- Released: June 26, 2020
- Recorded: 2019
- Venue: Fearless Church
- Genre: Worship
- Length: 51:00
- Label: Fearless International, BEC
- Producer: Joshua O'Haire, Jeremy Johnson

Fearless BND chronology
We Are Fearless (2017)	Fear Not (2020)

Fear Not is a studio album by contemporary worship band Fearless BND. It was released on June 26, 2020 by Fearless International and BEC Recordings. They worked with Joshua O’Haire and Jeremy Johnson in the production of this album.

== Critical reception ==
Professional ratings
Review scores
Source	Rating
One Man in the Middle	6.7/10 stars

Rating the album 6.7 stars for One Man in the Middle, Rob Allwright said, "The album Fear Not, is thankfully it is bolstered by a few good tracks at the beginning and end which show that they can write more complex and moving lyrics. One thing that is consistently good on this album is the vocals, they fit these songs really well with the different male and female leaders. This along with the fast-flowing nature of some of the songs means you can overlook the sometimes poorer writing and still very much enjoy the experience." Kevin Davis from New Release Today described Fear Not as "a truly anointed set of songs for the Church expressing a deep longing for Jesus".

== Track listing ==
No.	Title	Length
1.	"Fear Not (Spoken Word)"	3:04
2.	"Can't Get Enough"	3:05
3.	"Más Amor"	3:35
4.	"Won It All"	2:45
5.	"My Only Love"	2:37
6.	"Nobody Like You"	4:57
7.	"More of You"	4:01
8.	"Not a Chance"	5:33
9.	"Let Go"	2:55
10.	"At Your Name"	5:11
11.	"Shaking Off My Failures"	3:12
12.	"Victorius"	4:07
13.	"Fear Not"	5:39
Total length:		51:00
