= We Are Fearless =

Studio album by Fearless BND
- Released: February 24, 2017
- Genre: Worship
- Length: 74:37
- Label: Fearless International
- Producer: Joshua Ohaire & Jeremy Johnson

Fearless BND chronology
Live Riot (2012)	We Are Fearless (2017)	Fear Not (2020)

We Are Fearless is a studio album by contemporary worship band Fearless BND. It was released on February 24, 2017 by Fearless International.

== Critical reception ==
Professional ratings
Review scores
Source	Rating
Jesus Freak Hideout	4.5/5 stars

Rating the album four and half stars for Jesus Freak Hideout, Nicole Marie Vacca says, If there is one word to describe We Are Fearless, it is certainly "fun." The album kicks off with the bouncy, summery opener "Brighter," a track that is sure to get listeners' heads nodding, toes tapping, and fists pumping. The next five tracks maintain the momentum, featuring heavy bass beats, finger-snap samples, experimental electronic interludes, and lyrics encouraging listeners to "dance," "jump," "rise," and "lift," making these first six tracks ideal for a cardio workout playlist.

== Track listing ==
No.	Title	Length
1.	"Brighter"	3:06
2.	"Jump Around"	2:52
3.	"We Lift You Higher"	3:43
4.	"The Anticipation"	3:30
5.	"Love Like Fire"	3:16
6.	"Never Let Me Go"	4:23
7.	"Anchored"	5:12
8.	"White Flag"	8:46
9.	"We Are Fearless"	3:16
10.	"Only For You"	4:00
11.	"Letting Go"	3:55
12.	"Revival"	5:31
13.	"Shake the Skies"	5:54
14.	"Anchored II (Bonus)"	5:24
15.	"Never Let Me Go (feat. Adrian Moriconi) [Bonus] [Remix]"	3:43
16.	"Never Let Me Go (feat. Jared Bala) [Bonus] [Remix]"	3:33
17.	"Never Let Me Go (feat. Preston Parsons) [Bonus] [Remix]"	4:27
Total length:		74:37
