= The Power of Geography =

2021 non-fiction book by Tim Marshall

The Power of Geography: Ten Maps that Reveal the Future of Our World
- Author: Tim Marshall
- Language: English
- Subject: Geopolitics
- Genre: non-fiction
- Published: 2021
- Publisher: Elliott & Thompson
- Publication place: United Kingdom
- Pages: 272
- ISBN: 978-1-78396-602-8
- Preceded by: Prisoners of Geography
- Website: Elliott & Thompson

The Power of Geography: Ten Maps that Reveal the Future of Our World is a book on geopolitics by the British author and journalist Tim Marshall. It was published by Elliott & Thompson in 2021 and is the sequel to his 2015 book Prisoners of Geography.

== Synopsis ==
Marshall is a journalist for the BBC and Sky News. In the book, he focuses on ten areas that he considers to be potential hotspots in the future due to their geography, for reasons including climate change, ethnic strife and competition for resources. The areas in focus are Australia, Iran, Saudi Arabia, the United Kingdom, Greece and Turkey, the Sahel (the transition zone on the edge of the Sahara desert), Ethiopia, Spain and outer space.

Marshall considers that immigration from the Sahel to Europe will continue, that wars may break out in Ethiopia's neighbours due to their reliance on the country's water, that oil is running out in Saudi Arabia and that Britain is seeking new alliances post-Brexit. He analyses Australia's role as a U.S. ally and its relations with its Pacific neighbours, including China. In his view, Iran faces the choice between social liberalisation, or revolt from its young population. He predicts an arms race between the US, Russia and China to be the dominant power in outer space, similar to the Cold War nuclear arms race.

== Reception ==
Katie Burton of Geographical, the official magazine of the Royal Geographical Society, called the book "A sharp and concise evaluation of today’s geopolitics", considering it accessible yet not oversimplified.

Writing for The Hindu, Prasanna Aditya judged the book to be a good introduction to its topics that opens the way for the reader to further research.

Charlotte Heathcote of the Daily Mirror noted the recurring scenario throughout the book that China is aiming to surpass the United States as the world's superpower, and concluded "I can’t imagine reading a better book this year".

In The Canberra Times, reviewer Mark Thomas rejected Marshall's central thesis that geography determines the fate of nations, but reserved praise for the chapters on Ethiopia, Spain and Iran.
