= Divinity Engine =

Game engine developed by Larian Studios

Divinity Engine is a game engine developed by Larian Studios. It has undergone several iterations, with the latest version being Divinity Engine 4.0 developed for Baldur's Gate 3.

Divinity Engine 2 toolkit used in Divinity: Original Sin

== History ==
Larian began development of Divinity Engine 1 for its game Divinity: Original Sin on a budget of only a few million dollars. Larian included a copy of the Divinity 1.0 Engine with Divinity: Original Sin for some Kickstarter backers, allowing them to make custom mods. To showcase the abilities of the engine, Larian included a "cow simulator" game made with the Divinity Engine Toolkit in its early access release.

Divinity Engine 2 was developed for Divinity: Original Sin II. Divinity Engine 2, along with all the in-house tools Larian developed such as for making levels, was included in the game files as "DivinityEngine2.exe". It had a focus of improving existing tools from Divinity Engine 1 as well as creating new tools and improving documentation. The engine has also been referred to as "Divinity Engine 3.0."

Divinity Engine 4.0 was developed for Baldur's Gate 3. A major focus for the new iteration was better support for cinematics. It included a Vulkan backend which was used as an option in Baldur's Gate 3 alongside the DirectX 11 backend. The modding tools initially included with Baldur's Gate 3 were not as extensive as those included in previous Larian games. In September 2024, an update for Baldur's Gate 3 was shipped that included essentially a modified version of Divinity Engine 4.0 but with many of the features disabled by default, including the level editor, although there are mods that can enable it. Larian developers attributed part of the game's success with their continued use of Divinity Engine as opposed to using a commercial engine such as Unreal Engine, having used and worked on the engine since 2010 while with commercial engines "the engine's roadmap is not necessarily your roadmap".
