= The L.E.D. Wars =

1997 video game

- Developer: Larian Studios
- Publisher: Ionos
- Platform: Windows
- Release: 1997
- Genres: Science fiction Real-time strategy

The L.E.D. Wars is a 1997 video game from Larian Studios.

== Gameplay ==
In The L.E.D. Wars, players become involved in a futuristic conflict where multinational corporations battle for control over the scarce and vital Life Evolution Drug (L.E.D.), a substance essential for human survival following a genetic disaster. The gameplay centers around real-time strategy mechanics, allowing players to build unlimited combat units and structures, manage corporate assets, and expand across vast maps. Players must plant, grow, harvest, and refine the led plant to produce L.E.D. pills, all while defending their operations with amphibious, land, air, and sea units. The game offers extensive single-player and multiplayer modes, including up to 20 multiplayer levels and support for up to 8 players via network or internet play. A built-in Windows 95 editor lets players create custom maps and scenarios.

== Development ==
The game was developed by 4 people at Belgian company Larian Studios in around 6 months.

== Reception ==
Reception

Review scores
Publication	Score
Freak	40%
Power Unlimited	84%

Power Unlimited gave the game a score of 84%, praising the graphics and sounds.
