= Divinity (series) =

- Logo for the upcoming game
- Genre: Role-playing
- Developer: Larian Studios
- Platforms: Microsoft Windows; OS X; macOS; Linux; Xbox 360; Nintendo Switch; PlayStation 4; Xbox One
- First release: Divine Divinity; 13 September 2002
- Latest release: Divinity: Original Sin II; 14 September 2017

Divinity is a role-playing video game series developed by Larian Studios. The franchise was introduced in 2002 with Divine Divinity. The franchise received more mainstream attention following the critically and commercially successful release of Divinity: Original Sin (2014).

== Main games ==
Release timeline
2002	Divine Divinity
2003
2004	Beyond Divinity
2005
2006
2007
2008
2009	Divinity II: Ego Draconis
2010	Divinity II: The Dragon Knight Saga
2011
2012
2013	Divinity: Dragon Commander
2014	Divinity: Original Sin
2015	Divinity: Original Sin - Enhanced Edition
2016
2017	Divinity: Original Sin II
2018
2019
2020
2021
2022
2023
2024
2025
TBA	Divinity

=== Divine Divinity (2002) ===
Development of Divine Divinity started as Divinity: The Sword of Lies. The game was based on developer Larian Studios's cancelled project, The Lady, the Mage and the Knight, and it was inspired by Diablo. According to studio founder Swen Vincke, the publisher rushed Divine Divinity's development and released the game while Vincke was still on press tours promoting it and did not know that the game, which required more work, was released. The game received generally positive reviews upon release and it sold very well. However, the contract agreement with the publisher meant that Larian did not earn any money from the game as the game was not commercially successful enough. Larian nearly closed its doors following the release of the game.

=== Beyond Divinity (2004) ===
Vincke reassembled the development team to make a sequel to Divine Divinity, and the main goal for this release was financial profit. The development for the game was also rushed, with quests being rewritten and features being removed so that the game could release on time. The game received generally mixed reviews upon release, and it is considered to be one of the weaker games in the series.

=== Divinity II (2009) ===
While the first two installments in the series were 3D perspective role-playing games, the team wanted to step up and make a 3D action role-playing game. The team was impressed by the production value behind Xbox 360 games and decided to make a game for that platform. Bethesda Game Studios agreed to license their Gamebryo engine for Larian to make the game. Divinity II: Ego Draconis was released in 2009, and the publishers rushed the game's development again as they were under the pressure of bankruptcy during the 2009 financial crisis. The game received mixed reviews upon release. An updated version for the game, titled The Dragon Knight Saga, was released in 2010 and published by Focus Home Interactive. The Dragon Knight Saga received generally positive reviews, a significant improvement over Ego Draconis.

=== Divinity: Original Sin (2014) ===
Using the funds from venture capitalists, the team wanted to create a turn-based strategy game for Xbox Live Arcade. The team saw the opportunity of making a 3D third-person view role-playing game since there were not a lot of these games on the market. However, despite the team wanting to expand the game's scope, many of its staff were reassigned to finish Dragon Commander, which was not very profitable for the company. As the studio was working on the game, they wanted to expand its scope, but the studio was slowly running out of money. According to a studio member, Original Sin was the do-or-die project for Larian. A crowdfunding campaign was launched on Kickstarter on 27 March 2013 so that the team would have additional budget to publish the game. The Kickstarter was successfully funded by 26 April, raising almost $950,000, with donations from other sources bringing the total to over $1,000,000 of the game's final budget of €4 million. The game was made by about 35-40 people. The game received very positive reviews when it was released in 2014, and an Enhanced Edition for the game was published by Focus Home in the following year for consoles.

=== Divinity: Original Sin II (2017) ===
Following the success of Original Sin, the studio decided to expand their team to about 130 in order to make a sequel. Larian returned to Kickstarter to secure additional funds for the game's development. Despite being financially stable, Larian returned to crowdfunding again so that they could gather community opinion and further expand the scope of the game. Ultimately, the Kickstarter campaign was a big success, with over 2 million dollars collected in total. The game was released as an early access title in 2016, and the full release came in the following year. The game received critical acclaim upon release, and it was regarded as one of the best role-playing games of all time.

=== Divinity (TBA) ===
Larian Studios announced a new entry, Divinity, during The Game Awards 2025. CEO Swen Vincke described it as "our biggest, most ambitious RPG yet".

== Spin-offs ==
=== Divinity: Dragon Commander (2013) ===
Following multiple unpleasant experiences with publishers, the team decided to approach venture capitalists directly to fund the game's development. Dragon Commander is a spin-off title, which expanded the dragon combat featured in Divinity II. It is a real-time strategy game and it received generally mixed reviews from critics. Dragon Commander was not a very profitable game, according to Vincke.

=== Divinity: Fallen Heroes (cancelled) ===
A spin-off sequel to Original Sin II titled, Divinity: Fallen Heroes was announced in March 2019 via a trailer, and would have been co-developed by Larian Studios and Logic Artists. The game would have used the same engine as Original Sin II and also let the player influence the story. It would have been considered a spin-off due to moving focus away from exploration, RPG elements and interactions with NPCs, instead toward a shorter experience with battle turns alternating between all player units and all enemy units turn (rather than the individual initiative mechanic featured in Origin Sin II). Other new gameplay additions would have included parties of six characters (up from Divinity II's limit of four), guns and gunpowder as weapons, and a new element called Sulfurium; two-player cooperative play would have been featured, with both players controlling three characters.

Fallen Heroes was to be set two years after the end of the previous game and follow the Original Sin II ending in which the Godwoken purges all Source from Rivellon. It would have featured eight main playable protagonists, including the six pre-made playable characters of Original Sin II, Beast, Fane, Ifan, Lohse, the Red Prince (now named the Red Emperor) and Sebille, as well as Malady, a key non-playable character from the first game. The story would have followed the characters in a world now devoid of Source, except for the player's party whose ship the Lady Vengeance was preserved from the Source purge by Malady. The characters would have led the fight against the Bloodless (an undead-like force decimating Rivellon) while travelling across the map in the Lady Vengeance.

Originally scheduled to be released in November 2019 on multiple platforms, it was put on hold indefinitely on October 15, only a month before its announced release, with Larian Studios claiming that the game required "far greater development time and resources than are available now to bring it to fruition". After years without follow-up, Larian Studios founder Swen Vincke confirmed in a July 14, 2023 interview with GamesRadar+ that Fallen Heroes had been cancelled, stating "That didn't work out [...] It's gone for good." In the same interview, he claimed that another, unannounced Original Sin II spin-off, which he called "DOS2 with new mechanics", had been cancelled "quite far" into development.

== Other media ==
Larian partnered with Lynnvander Studios to make Divinity: Original Sin the Board Game.

== See also ==
- Baldur's Gate III
