= Worth Dying For (album) =

Studio album by Worth Dying For
- Released: April 15, 2008
- Recorded: Modesto, California, Mobile, Alabama
- Genre: contemporary worship, contemporary Christian, Christian rock, pop rock
- Label: Integrity Music
- Producer: Henry Seely; Joth Hunt; Dave Wyatt

Worth Dying For chronology
Worth Dying For (2008)	Love Riot (2011)

Professional ratings
Review scores
Source	Rating
Jesus Freak Hideout	3/5 stars
Cross Rhythms	8/10 stars

Worth Dying For is the self-titled debut album of the Modesto, California-based contemporary worship band Worth Dying For (now Fearless BND). It was released by Integrity Music in April 2008.

== Trivia ==
Joth Hunt, of the Australian worship conference movement Planetshakers, was flown into the United States to help produce this album. Henry Seely also from Planetshakers also worked on this album. The original title of this album when it was an independent release was "Ammunition". Two songs on the original release, "Great" and "To Love You" were replaced by "Let it Out" and "At Your Cross".

== Track listing ==
1. Revolution (Micah Berteau)
2. Let It Out (Sean Loche, Berteau)
3. Unite (Loche)
4. Crazy (Berteau, Christy Johnson)
5. Die To Live (Berteau)
6. Holy (Berteau)
7. Consume Me Now (Loche)
8. All We (Loche)
9. At Your Cross (Berteau, Josh O'Haire)
10. My Only One (Berteau, Loche)
11. Take Me (Berteau)
12. Lose Myself (Johnson)
13. The Change (Loche and Jennifer Avelino)
14. Unafraid (Johnson)
15. Infiltrate (Loche)

== Chart performance ==
WDF charted at #166 on Billboard Magazine's Billboard 200 chart and #11 on their Christian Albums chart.
