= Fearless BND =

American Christian worship band

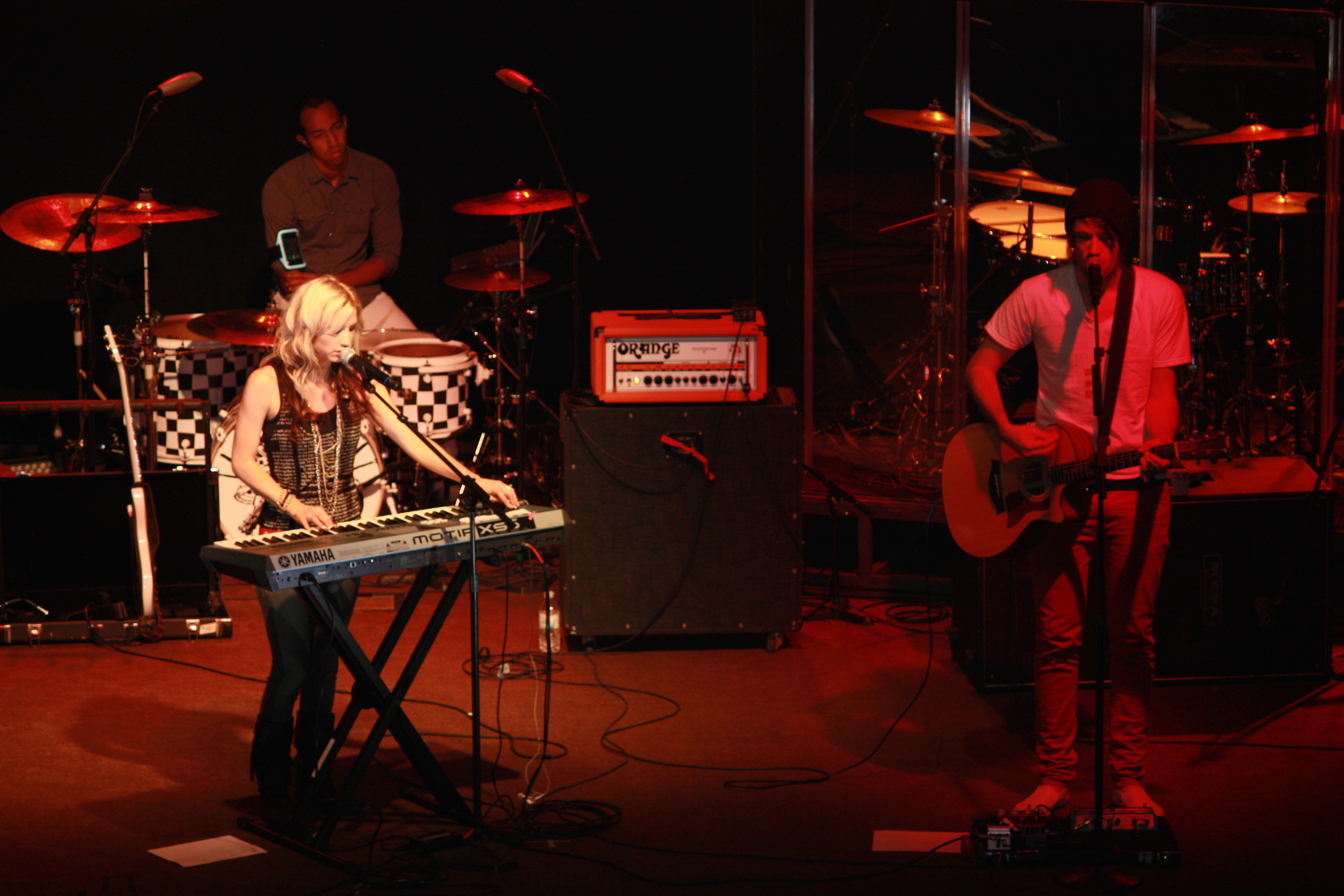
- Fearless BND at a concert

Background information
- Origin: Modesto, California
- Genres: Worship music, contemporary Christian music, Christian rock
- Years active: 2005–present
- Labels: Ammunition; Integrity; Fearless International; BEC
- Website: s2318.churchbase.io

Fearless BND (formerly Worth Dying For) is an American Christian worship band encompassing various artists from the Southern California based Ammunition Movement. Originating from the Modesto, California, ministry Ammunition, they set out with their lead pastor, Jeremy Johnson to plant a church in the Southern California area in early 2012. Their self-titled debut album was released on April 15, 2008, by Integrity Music. Their second album, Love Riot, was released in February 2011. An EP was released at the NEXT youth Convention in Hershey, Pennsylvania. In 2012, they released Live Riot.

== Discography ==
=== Albums ===
Year	Title	Label	Chart peaks		
Year	Title	Label	Billboard 200	US Heat.	US Christ.
2007	Ammunition	Self Released	—	—	—
2008	Worth Dying For	Integrity Music	166	4	11
2011	Love Riot	Ammunition Records	—	48	48
2012	Live Riot	Ammunition Records	—	18	38
2017	We Are Fearless	Fearless International	—	—	—
2020	Fear Not	Fearless International, BEC	—	—	—

=== EPs ===
Year	Title	Label	Chart peaks	
Year	Title	Label	Billboard 200	US Christ.
2010	Love Riot EP	Ammunition Records	—	—
2020	My Only Love EP	Fearless International	—	—

=== Singles ===
- Anchored (Radio Version) (March 2017)
- Victorius (September 2018)
- "Más Amor" (April 2020)
- "Can't Get Enough" (May 2020)
