= Continental divide (disambiguation) =

A continental divide is a drainage divide on a continent such that the drainage basin on one side of the divide feeds into one ocean or sea, and the basin on the other side either feeds into a different ocean or sea, or is unconnected. Continental divide may also refer to:

== Geography or topology ==
- Continental Divide of the Americas, which separates Pacific-feeding basins from Atlantic- and Arctic- feeding basins in the Americas
- Continental Divide Trail (also known as the Continental Divide National Scenic Trail), a scenic trail in the United States
- Eastern Continental Divide in the United States that separates the Atlantic Seaboard watershed from the Gulf of Mexico watershed
- For named continental divides by continent, see Continental divide

== Places ==
- Continental Divide, New Mexico, an unincorporated community in New Mexico
- Continental Divide Raceways, a racetrack in Castle Rock, Colorado

== Arts, entertainment, and media ==
- Continental Divide (film), 1981 romantic comedy
- Continental Divide: Heidegger, Cassirer, Davos, 2010 philosophy book
- The Continental Divide (album), 2009 album by American rock band War Tapes

== See also ==
- Boundaries between continents (geophysical or geopolitical rather than hydrological boundaries)
- Triple divide, an intersection of two continental divides (or other drainage divides)
