= Vulvar disease =

Disease in the female external reproductive organs

A vulvar disease is a particular abnormal, pathological condition that affects part or all of the vulva. Several pathologies are defined. Some can be prevented by vulvovaginal health maintenance.

== Vulvar cancer ==
Vulvar cancer accounts for about 5% of all gynecological cancers and typically affects women in later life. Five-year survival rates in the United States are around 70%.

Symptoms of vulvar cancer include itching, a lump or sore on the vulva which does not heal and/or grows larger, and sometimes discomfort/pain/swelling in the vulval area. Treatments include vulvectomy – removal of all or part of the vulva.

== Vulvo-perineal localization of dermatologic disorders ==
Systemic disorders may be localized in the vulvo-perineal region.

- In Langerhans cell histiocytosis, lesions initially are erythematous, purpuric papules and they then become scaly, crusted and sometimes confluent.
- In Kawasaki disease, an erythematous, desquamating perineal rash may occur in the second week of symptom onset, almost at the same time as palmoplantar desquamation.
- Acrodermatitis enteropathica is a biochemical disorder of zinc metabolism.
- Diaper dermatitis in infancy

== Blemishes and cysts ==
- Epidermal cysts
- Angiomas
- Moles
- Freckles
- Lentigos
- Scars
- Scarification
- Vitiligo
- Tattoos
- Hypertrophy
- Sinus pudoris
- Bartholin's cyst
- Skene's duct cyst, a paraurethral cyst

== Infections ==
- Candidiasis (thrush)
- Bacterial vaginosis (BV)
- Genital warts, due to human papilloma virus (HPV)
- Molluscum contagiosum
- Herpes simplex (genital herpes)
- Herpes zoster (shingles)
- Tinea cruris (fungus)
- Hidradenitis suppurativa
- Infestations with pinworms (rare), scabies and lice.

== Inflammatory diseases ==
- Eczema/dermatitis
- Lichen simplex (chronic eczema)
- Psoriasis
- Lichen sclerosus
- Lichen planus
- Zoon's vulvitis (Zoon's balanitis in men)
- Pemphigus vulgaris
- Pemphigoid (mucous membrane pemphigoid, cicatricial pemphigoid, bullous pemphigoid)

== Pain syndromes ==
- Vulvodynia and vulvar vestibulitis
- Vaginismus

== Ulcers ==
- Aphthous ulcer
- Behcet's Disease

== Developmental disorders ==
- Septate vagina
- Vaginal opening extremely close to the urethra or anus
- An imperforate hymen
- Various stages of genital masculinization including fused labia, an absent or partially formed vagina, urethra located on the clitoris.
- Intersex

=== Tumoral and hamartomatous diseases ===
- Hemangiomas and vascular dysplasia may involve the perineal region
- Infantile perianal pyramidal protrusion

== Other ==
- Vulvar lymphangioma
- Paget's disease of the vulva
- Vulvar intraepithelial neoplasia (VIN)
- Bowen's disease
- Bowenoid papulosis
- Vulvar varicose veins
- Labial adhesions
- Perineodynia (perineal pain)
- Desquamative inflammatory vaginitis (DIV)
- Childbirth tears and episiotomy related changes
- Vestibulodynia

== See also ==
- Vaginal disease
- list of ICD-10 codes
