= Worth Dying For (Marshall book) =

2016 book on the study of flags by Tim Marshall

- First edition (UK) cover
- Author: Tim Marshall
- Language: English
- Subject: Vexillology
- Genre: Non-fiction
- Published: 2016 (UK), 2017 (US)
- Publisher: Elliott & Thompson (UK), Simon & Schuster (US)
- Publication place: United Kingdom
- Pages: 297
- ISBN: 978-1-78396-303-4
- Website: UK, US

Worth Dying For: The Power and Politics of Flags is a 2016 book on vexillology (the study of flags) by British journalist and author Tim Marshall, published by Elliott & Thompson. It was published in the United States by Simon & Schuster in 2017 as A Flag Worth Dying For: The Power and Politics of National Symbols.

== Synopsis ==
Marshall, a journalist who has worked in 25 countries over 40 years for the BBC and Sky News among others, writes in the book about flags and their role in history and identity. He details their history, including how the discovery and export of silk by China resulted in their popularisation around the world. Topics include the Confederate battle flag and its modern controversy, the use of the Union Jack by far-right groups and reclamation by British citizens of all ethnic groups, and the adoption of the current flag of South Africa after the end of apartheid. A final chapter includes non-state flags, such as the Jolly Roger, the flags of the Red Cross and Red Crescent Movement and racing's Chequered flag.

== Reception ==
A review by Lawrence Joffe in The Jewish Chronicle praised Marshall for using his experience as an international journalist to animate a subject that "at first glance, [...] might seem dry".

Aaron Retica of The New York Times gave a mixed review, finding the book to be overreaching in some of its interpretations of flags, such as the Flag of Europe or that of the Islamic State. He criticised the inclusion of the flags of Israel, Iran and Turkey in the "Colours of Arabia" chapter, but found the book to offer a "surprising fact or six along the way", such as Gilbert Baker finding inspiration for the LGBT Rainbow flag from the United States Bicentennial.

Writing for The Washington Post, Moisés Naím found the book timely for what he considered to be an age of heightened nationalism. He criticised Marshall's approach as one of a hobbyist and not an analyst, in that he compiled facts about flags instead of interpreting their roles. In USA Today, Ray Locker concluded that the book was "fresh explanation of symbols we often take for granted, and a keen meditation on what flags mean to those who embrace or recoil from them". A review in The New Yorker called the book "Bristling with historical trivia and commentary on current events".
