= Divided (book) =

2018 book on borders

- First edition
- Author: Tim Marshall
- Language: English
- Subject: Border barriers
- Genre: non-fiction
- Published: 2018
- Publisher: Elliott & Thompson
- Publication place: United Kingdom
- Pages: 320
- ISBN: 9781783963973
- Website: Elliott & Thompson

Divided: Why We're Living in an Age of Walls is a book on border barriers by the British author and journalist Tim Marshall. It was published by Elliott & Thompson in 2018.

== Synopsis ==
Marshall notes that the majority of border barriers built since the end of the Second World War were not Cold War structures like the Berlin Wall, but constructed in the 21st century. Chapters of the book are on barriers such as the Great Wall of China, the Moroccan Western Sahara Wall, the wall on the Bangladesh–India border, the Israeli West Bank barrier and the Mexico–United States barrier. Marshall writes that the 2015 European migrant crisis resulted in a rise in far-right parties, and believes that nation states should be protected while a "21st-century Marshall Plan" redistributes wealth to the Global South.

== Reception ==
Samanth Subramanian of the Financial Times was disappointed that the book appeared to be sourced from journals and newspapers rather than Marshall's experiences as an international journalist. He also disliked how Marshall deemed wall-building to be "human nature" and did not deal with the paradox of humanity's most interconnected era also being the one with the most border barriers.

Writing in Geographical, the official magazine of the Royal Geographical Society, Laura Cole also found Marshall to be "on the fence" about why there was an increase in wall-building in the 21st century. She praised sections on internal dividers, such as gated communities in the United States and South Africa, and China's online Great Firewall. In The Times Literary Supplement, Marcello Di Cintio praised Marshall's level of research on topics such as black disadvantage in the United States.

Huston Gilmore of the Daily Express gave the book four stars out of five. He criticised the lack of development of Marshall's ideas and found the conclusion to be rushed. A review by Michael McCosh in The Press and Journal called the book "a very knowledgeable, timely book and a good primer on current problems in a longer-term context", but deemed it to need "more of a flourish" due to the serious topics.
