= Divinity (upcoming video game) =

Upcoming video game

- Developer: Larian Studios
- Publisher: Larian Studios
- Director: Swen Vincke
- Series: Divinity
- Platform: Windows
- Genre: Role-playing
- Modes: Single-player, multiplayer

Divinity is an upcoming role-playing video game developed and published by Larian Studios. It is the seventh game in the Divinity series.

== Development ==
The title was unveiled during The Game Awards 2025 with a cinematic teaser trailer with dark fantasy themes. The game has been described as more ambitious in scope and scale than Larian Studios' previous works. The game's reveal was teased prior to the Game Awards with a statue in the Mojave Desert, which was named the 'Hellstone' by Larian after the game's reveal.

Vincke stated that the development team will build upon their previous work, and confirmed both that Divinity will be a turn-based role-playing game and will be created in a new version of their proprietary game engine. The game will offer both single-player and cooperative multiplayer options. As with Larian's past games, it will likely be first released through early access. As of January 2026, around 500 employees at Larian were working on the project.
