= Crazy Monkey Studios =

Video game developer

- Type: Private
- Industry: Video games
- Headquarters: Kontich, Belgium
- Website: Crazy Monkey Studios - Official Site

Crazy Monkey Studios is an independent video game development studio. Founded in 2010, it rebranded into Rogueside in 2020. Crazy Monkey Studios originally had its office in Kontich, Belgium until 2018, after which it relocated to Geel, Belgium.

== History ==
Crazy Monkey Studios was founded in 2010 by Steven Verbeek and Martijn Holtkamp, after they met at a game conference. They teamed up to develop the game 'Empire: The Deck Building Strategy Game'. With limited resources, they created Empire and launched it on iOS and Android. In 2014 the studio teamed up with Claeysbrothers to publish their game Guns, Gore and Cannoli and launched the game on Steam, Xbox One, PS4 and Nintendo Switch in 2015. After a success release they again worked with Claeysbrothers to program and publish a sequel for them and launched Guns, Gore and Cannoli 2 in 2018 on the same platforms. Since then, according to a Claeysbrothers developer, Crazy Monkey Studios has stopped working with Claeysbrothers and has refused requests from them to make a third game. The Crazy Monkey team split up in 2018 and the majority relocated to a new office location in Geel, Belgium for a new start.

They teamed up with Warcave in 2018 to develop the real time strategy game War Party that got released on Steam, Xbox One, PS4, Nintendo Switch in 2019.

In 2020 the company launched the hidden object game named 'Hidden Through Time'.

== Games ==
- Empire: The Deck Building Strategy Game (2013, iOS)
- Guns, Gore and Cannoli: launch: April 30, 2015 on Steam
- Guns, Gore and Cannoli 2 (2018)
- Warparty (2019) (PC title: War Party)
- Hidden Through Time (2020)
- Warhammer 40,000: Shootas, Blood and Teef (2022)
- Hidden Through Time 2: Myths and Magic (2023)
- Hidden Through Time 2: Discovery (2024)
- Best Served Cold (2025)
