= Woolfe: The Red Hood Diaries =

2015 video game

- Developer: GriN Gamestudio
- Publisher: GriN Gamestudio
- Director: Wim Wouters
- Producer: Wim Wouters
- Designers: Steven Melis; Bruno Lebrun; Filip Van Mieghem
- Programmers: Jelle Voet; Baptiste Deboutte; Yana Roggeman; Bas Bergfeld
- Artists: Davy Penasse; Steven Melis; Bruno Lebrun; Filip Van Mieghem
- Writer: Yasmin Van de Werf
- Composer: Tom Bleys
- Engine: Unreal Engine 3
- Platform: Microsoft Windows
- Release: 17 March 2015
- Genres: Platform, hack and slash
- Mode: Single-player

Woolfe: The Red Hood Diaries is a side-scrolling platform hack and slash video game developed and published by Belgian independent development studio GriN Gamestudio. The game was released on 17 March 2015 for Microsoft Windows.

On 10 August 2015, Wim Wouters, producer at GriN Gamestudio, published an announcement on the studio's website, in which he stated that the studio has closed down and requested bankruptcy, cancelling the development on the game's sequel Woolfe Volume 2. He claims that poor sales and bad reviews put GriN Gamestudio into a massive debt that they could not pay back, as well as leaving them with the inability to provide the backer rewards promised to people who helped fund the game on Kickstarter.

Following the shut-down, on October 21st, 2015, the Woolfe IP was acquired by Rebellion Developments, who was willing to deliver the Kickstarter backer rewards.

== Development and release ==
The game was partially financed by the Vlaams Audiovisueel Fonds (Flanders Audiovisual Funds), which supplied 60,000 €, and the Participatiemaatschappij Vlaanderen Cultuurinvest (PMV Culture Investment). Additionally, it was funded through a Kickstarter campaign, with which the developer raised $72,139. The game initially launched on 17 March 2015 for Microsoft Windows through Steam, with the PlayStation 4 and Xbox One version still in development. The console version were later canceled, leading up to the complete close-down of GriN Gamestudio, and the cancellation of planned sequel Woolfe Volume 2, on 10 August 2015.

On 21 October 2015, it was announced that Rebellion Developments had obtained the IP to Woolfe, gaining its publishing and development rights. Following the acquisition, they announced that they were going to deliver the backer rewards that were advertised on the game's Kickstarter campaign for those who helped fund the game. The rewards later started being shipped on 4 November 2015.

== Reception ==
Reception

Aggregate scores
Aggregator	Score
GameRankings	51.69%
Metacritic	55/100

Review scores
Publication	Score
GameSpot	4/10
IGN	7/10

Woolfe: The Red Hood Diaries was largely met with average to negative reviews from critics, currently holding a score of 55 out of 100 on Metacritic, and a score of 51.69% on GameRankings.

IGN Spain was more favourable towards the game, rating it a 7/10.

Arcade Sushi gave 5/10.

GameSpot saw Woolfe less favourably, calling its concept derivative and comparing it unfavourably to Akaneiro: Demon Hunters and The Path, which both also explored Little Red Riding Hood, as well as Alice and Alice Returns, which expound on Alice in Wonderland. The review goes on to find fault in the game's dialogue, story, combat, enemies, and length, giving it a final rating of 4/10. Hooked Gamers (4.2/10), CGM (4/10), shared similar feelings and thoughts about the game.
