= Divinity: Dragon Commander =

2013 video game

- Developer(s): Larian Studios
- Publisher(s): Larian Studios
- Director(s): Swen Vincke
- Producer(s): David Walgrave
- Designer(s): Farhang Namdar
- Writer(s): Jan Van Dosselaer
- Composer(s): Kirill Pokrovsky
- Series: Divinity
- Platform(s): Microsoft Windows
- Release: 6 August 2013
- Genre(s): Real-time strategy
- Mode(s): Single-player, multiplayer

Divinity: Dragon Commander is a real-time strategy video game developed by Larian Studios as part of the Divinity series of fantasy role-playing games. The game features a hybrid of gameplay styles and has single-player, competitive multiplayer and cooperative multiplayer modes.

== Gameplay ==
The gameplay of Divinity: Dragon Commander is broken up into three phases which affect each other. The first phase has elements of a political simulation, where the player has conversations with multiple non-player characters and makes political decisions which affect the gameplay in the other two phases. For example, the player can decide whether or not to create a don't ask, don't tell policy in their army, and their decision will affect the relations between the player character and the various races. In this phase, the player can research abilities, influence factions, and receive cards which can be traded in for special effects in the other two phases.

The second phase of the game is in the style of a turn-based strategy game, based on board games like Risk, and designed first as a board game while the game was still in development. In this mode, the player can use cards earned in the RPG phase to affect their own territories and units or those of their enemies. The player can also construct one building per territory, and recruit and move units. Once the units of two opposing sides meet, the player can play cards which take effect only for that battle, and can choose whether to automatically resolve the battle, or choose to fight themselves. The player can only fight in one battle per 'round' (a full set of the three phases).

The third phase of the game takes place once a battle is joined and is in the style of a real-time strategy game. The player constructs buildings and recruits units from the population pool of the region where the battle takes place. All construction and recruitment is done through units of recruits, which increase at a slow rate until the area's population is depleted. A player can increase the rate of recruitment by capturing and building more recruitment stations. Aside from the traditional point-and-click based style of control, the player can also take the form of a dragon in battle and aid their units in both offense and defense, at the cost of sacrificing some control over their units while in dragon form.

== Plot ==
Dragon Commander takes place thousands of years before all other Divinity games. The player character is the titular Dragon Commander, the bastard son of Aurora, a dragon who took on human form, and Emperor Sigurd, who united Rivellon into a single empire for the first time in history using steampunk-styled technology provided by a demon named Corvus. When Aurora is fatally poisoned, Sigurd withdraws from his duties, his empire becomes unstable, and his three legitimate yet insane children amass their own armies in secret before launching a coup and then embroiling Rivellon in civil war. Maxos, a powerful wizard and ally of the late Sigurd, comes to the Dragon Commander as the only sane heir remaining, and asks him to enter the fight and win the war so that the demonic technology can be destroyed. With no army of his own, the Dragon Commander is obliged to draw much of his support from the non-human races: the traditionalist Undead, the libertarian Elves, the capitalist Dwarves, and the republican Lizardmen. This requires him to enter a political marriage with one of four princesses and carefully balance the advice and requests of ambassadors and generals to retain each race's backing.

At first, the Dragon Commander is ignored by his siblings and viewed with apprehension by the public due to his limited forces, but a series of victories in an island province demonstrate his strategic talent and position him to invade Rivellon's heartlands. As the Dragon Commander grapples with his siblings' armies, Maxos reveals that Corvus is being used to power his airship, and offers him the chance to gain advantageous new technologies from the demon by sacrificing people to it. When the three other heirs are defeated, Corvus breaks free of his bindings and assumes control of the remnants of the enemy armies, revealing that he had planned for all four heirs to destroy each other so he could wreak havoc on Rivellon unopposed. Corvus's armies vary in strength depending on how many sacrifices were given to him, but each one that is defeated partially weakens the demon. When at last Corvus is vanquished and Rivellon is reunified under the Dragon Commander, the demon's machines are destroyed and the world enters an era known as the "Pax Draconis". Depending on the Dragon Commander's political decisions, the restored empire ranges from oppressive and tyrannical to just and enlightened, or may even be converted from a monarchy into a republic.

== Development ==
Dragon Commander was announced on 11 August 2011. Until that point, Larian had referred to Dragon Commander as "Project D", similar to the way in which Divinity: Original Sin was referred to as "Project E". Dragon Commander was presented at Gamescom in 2011 to journalists and gained attention through its novel premise often described as 'dragons with jetpacks'.

Dragon Commander was conceived at the same time as Divinity: Original Sin, in the aftermath of the release of Divinity II in 2009, the rushed development of which left Larian Studios in debt. At the time, Larian had only about 30 full-time employees. According to Larian CEO Swen Vincke, Dragon Commander was initially intended to be the larger of the two simultaneous projects, while Original Sin would be a smaller, more traditional RPG that released first. As time went on, however, Larian decided to focus its efforts on Original Sin and expanded it, resulting in funds being reallocated from Dragon Commander and it releasing in a state that Vincke felt was unsatisfactory.

== Reception ==
Reception

Aggregate score
| Aggregator | Score |
|---|---|
| Metacritic | 76/100 |

Review scores
| Publication | Score |
|---|---|
| GameSpot | 8.0/10 |
| IGN | 7.8/10 |

Critical response to Dragon Commander has been generally positive. The GameSpot review called the game a "gem", praising its many gameplay mechanics individually along with the visuals and audio. The Escapist awarded the game 3 stars out of 5 and criticized the strategy portion of the game as subpar, but the reviewer found the role playing gameplay and the story enjoyable and interesting.
