= Divinity: Original Sin II =

2017 video game

- Developer: Larian Studios
- Publishers: Larian Studios (PC); Bandai Namco Entertainment (consoles)
- Director: Swen Vincke
- Producer: Octaaf Fieremans
- Programmer: Bert Van Semmertier
- Artist: Joachim Vleminckx
- Writers: Jan Van Dosselaer; Sarah Baylus; Julien Brun
- Composer: Borislav Slavov
- Series: Divinity
- Engine: Divinity Engine
- Platforms: Windows; PlayStation 4; Xbox One; macOS; Nintendo Switch; iPadOS; Nintendo Switch 2; PlayStation 5; Xbox Series X/S
- Release: Windows; 14 September 2017; PlayStation 4, Xbox One; 31 August 2018; macOS; 31 January 2019; Nintendo Switch; 4 September 2019; iPadOS; 18 May 2021; Nintendo Switch 2, PlayStation 5, Xbox Series X/S; December 15, 2025
- Genre: Role-playing
- Modes: Single-player, multiplayer

Divinity: Original Sin II is a 2017 role-playing video game by Larian Studios. The sequel to Divinity: Original Sin (2014) and the fifth main entry in the Divinity series, the game was originally released for Windows in September 2017. The player controls a "Godwoken", a persecuted user of a powerful magic known as Source, and becomes a pivotal figure in the fight against the Voidwoken, which are monstrous creatures who wreak havoc in the medieval fantasy world of Rivellon.

Divinity: Original Sin II features turn-based tactical RPG combat played from an isometric perspective. The game focuses on character development, exploration and interactions with non-player characters (NPCs), allowing players to make decisions that impact the story and the world. A flexible quest system enables various approaches to resolving quests. Original Sin II was conceived to work as both a single-player or cooperative multiplayer game, and players can play alone controlling a party of one to four Godwoken, or in a group of two to four players dividing the playable characters between them.

Financed via a successful crowdfunding campaign on Kickstarter which raised $2 million, Original Sin II was a commercial and critical success, selling over a million copies in two months. It is frequently cited as one of the greatest video games of all time, with significant praise given to its writing, story interactivity, combat system, cooperative multiplayer, and music. Divinity: Original Sin II - Definitive Edition, an enhanced version featuring an expanded storyline and improved gameplay, was released on Windows, PlayStation 4, and Xbox One in 2018, and on macOS, Nintendo Switch, and iPadOS during the following years, with Bandai Namco Entertainment acting as publisher for all versions except on Windows. A sequel titled Divinity was announced in December 2025.

== Gameplay ==
In the game, players command a squad of four characters in turn-based combat against enemies.

Divinity: Original Sin II is a role-playing video game played from an isometric perspective. As with Divinity: Original Sin, players can play alone or in cooperative multiplayer, although Original Sin II allows a party of up to four players, while the first game only allowed two. Six pre-made characters with backstories are available to players, who can also choose to create a custom character and choose their stats, race, gender, and background at the start of the game. Although the origin story of a custom character will give them specific dialogue options, the six pre-made characters have dialogue options unavailable to any other character, as well as one sidequest for each involving unique events and interactions over the course of the game. While only Humans were playable in the previous game, Original Sin II also allows players to play as elves, dwarves, and lizards, all either living or undead; each variation gives occasional unique dialogue options, and influence the behavior of certain NPCs towards them.

Although players can play the entire story solely with the character they picked at the beginning of the game, they can recruit up to three NPCs to assist them as companions, becoming fully playable. On the first island of the game, only the six pre-made characters are available as companions, but the player can hire silent companions afterwards; conversely, the pre-made characters when acting as companions will react to the player character's actions and choices and grow to like or dislike them, which also influences the story.

While Original Sin II offers a wide variety of preset class builds, it has an otherwise open-ended class system that allows a high degree of flexibility. Combat of the game is turn based and uses an action-point system. During each turn, the player may perform multiple actions until they run out of action points. Players can choose skills from as many as ten different families, many of which can also be used out of combat. Different skills, when used in combination, can cause significant damage or unique effects. Both the player and enemies can utilize high ground and environmental elements such as water, ice, oil and fire to their advantage. In addition to health, characters may also be protected by physical and/or magic armor, which will negate incoming physical or magical damage and block negative status effects. Once the armor is fully destroyed, a character becomes vulnerable to direct damage on their health as well as status effects. A skill crafting system allows players to mix and change their skills.

The player can interact with both party members and non-playable characters. A dialogue tree offers several dialogue options for the player to select. Many situations in the game offer multiple solutions, which may result in consequences that affect the game world and progression. Typically, only the character who triggered a conversation with a NPC is involved in said conversation; pre-made characters, when acting as secondary members of a player's party, can sometimes interject in conversations, usually if the NPC relates to their own quest. All NPCs can die, though killing certain individuals may render some quests incompletable or force the player to find other ways to proceed. The game features both online and local multiplayer modes; multiplayer story mode is cooperative, with each player controlling one or several of the four members of the party both during exploration and battle. The game also features a competitive multiplayer mode where players are divided into two different teams and fight against each other in an arena.

== Story ==
=== Setting ===
Like other games in the series, Divinity: Original Sin II is set in the medieval fantasy world of Rivellon, and takes place centuries after Divinity: Original Sin. The story starts some years after the passing of Lucian, a Human who possessed unrivaled power and was revered by the people of Rivellon as the "Divine", the chosen one of the "Seven", the deities of Rivellon's main religion. Rivellon is currently plagued by the Voidwoken, monstrous creatures of mysterious origins who attack all other living things, and whose threat has greatly increased following Lucian's passing.

Among the people of Rivellon, Sourcerers are individuals born with the talent of manipulating a form of energy known as Source, which they can use to cast powerful spells; however, the use of Source attracts the Voidwoken, leading Sourcerers to become feared and reviled. The Divine Order, founded by Lucian, therefore dedicated one of its factions, the Magisters, to capture or kill all Sourcerers; the captured are sent to Fort Joy, a prison-town on Reaper's Eye, an island previously inhabited by Braccus Rex, (Note: A character mentioned in previous Divinity games, and who appears directly in the first Original Sin) the late "Source King" and former tyrannical ruler of Rivellon. The Magisters are led by Bishop Alexandar, Lucian's son who claims to be the new Divine, along with his advisor Dallis.

The player character is a Sourcerer, who can either be created from scratch by the player, or be one of six pre-made characters, all of whom can also be recruited as part of the player character's party: Beast, a male Dwarf hellbent on ending the reign of his cousin Justinia, the Dwarf Queen; Fane, a male and the undead-looking last member of a long-forgotten immortal species, who spent aeons imprisoned and now seeks to discover what happened to the rest of his kind; Ifan ben-Mezd, a male Human who is a former friend of Lucian and former member of the Divine Order, now part of a group of mercenaries known as the Lone Wolves; Lohse, a female Human seeking freedom from a mysterious and powerful demon inside her gaining more control every day; the Red Prince, a male Lizard originally destined to become a leader among his people, but who was banished due to dealings with a demon and now aims to regain his royal position; and Sebille, a female Elf and former slave looking for revenge against her former Lizard masters.

=== Plot ===
The player character, a Sourcerer, is captured by the Divine Order and transported to the island prison Fort Joy on the ship Merryweather. The ship is attacked and sunk by a gigantic Kraken Voidwoken; however, the player character is saved from drowning by a mysterious force, whose voice calls them "Godwoken". On Fort Joy, the Godwoken witnesses the brutal regime of the Magisters led by Alexandar and Dallis, who frequently "purge" prisoners of their Source, turning them into mindless husks they use as a fighting force. After escaping Fort Joy, the Godwoken meets the Seekers, a group looking for Sourcerers with the potential of becoming the new Divine. The Godwoken also visits the Hall of Echoes, where they encounter one of the Seven. The God, revealing themselves as the one who rescued the Godwoken earlier, explains that the Veil, a magical barrier separating Rivellon and the Void, is weakening and allowing the Voidwoken to enter Rivellon, draining the Seven's Source. The God urges the Godwoken to fulfill their potential, ascend to Divinity and hold back the Void before it kills the Seven. With the help of the Seekers and the half-demon Malady, the Godwoken escapes from Reaper's Eye after defeating Alexandar and stealing his sentient ship, the Lady Vengeance.

The Lady Vengeance is attacked by Dallis and her right-hand man Vredeman; most of the Seekers are killed but the ship manages a narrow escape thanks to Malady. The Godwoken sails to the island of Reaper's Coast, where they unlock their Source powers. Their God later directs the Godwoken to the Well of Ascension, where they can absorb enough Source to become Divine. They also learn that Dallis has excavated the Aeteran, an artifact able to purge all Source from Rivellon. The Godwoken meets Aeterna, a being who claims to be member of an immortal race called Eternals, the original inhabitants of Rivellon. The Godwoken learns that the Seven are in fact Eternals who craved power, and betrayed the rest of their species by banishing them to the Void. The Seven then created the mortal races of Rivellon, and posed as deities to maintain their own power by draining Source from them.

The Godwoken reaches the Nameless Isle, where the Well of Ascension is located. There, they learn that the Voidwoken are what became of the Eternals cast into the Void, and that God King, also the leader of the Voidwoken, is the Eternals' former king. The God King and the Voidwoken intend to return to Rivellon, and reclaim it as theirs. After a final encounter with Alexandar, the Godwoken reaches the Well, but before they can become Divine, Dallis appears and destroys the Well with the Aeteran. The Godwoken's failure enrages their God, who becomes blind with fury and attacks them; the Godwoken defeats them in battle, killing one of the Seven in the process.

The Godwoken travels to the city of Arx, which has come under siege by Voidwoken. Tracking Dallis and Vredeman to the tomb of Lucian, they find Lucian alive within, who reveals that he faked his death and that he, not the Void, had been draining Source from the Seven. Lucian intends to purge all Source from Rivellon and use it to permanently seal the Veil, forever keeping the Voidwoken away at the cost of all Source in the world. Dallis, secretly an Eternal, has been aiding Lucian behind Alexandar's back with the help of Vredeman, in truth a resurrected Braccus Rex whom Dallis turned into a reluctant slave.

Braccus Rex breaks free of Dallis's control and summons the Kraken to attack the Godwoken, Lucian, and Dallis. After defeating them, the player is presented with four final choices: become the new Divine and the most powerful being of Rivellon; fulfil Lucian's wish and purge all Source from Rivellon to forever seal the Voidwoken away; release the Source and the powers of Divinity to the world so all the beings in Rivellon become Divine; or allows the God King to return to Rivellon, restoring Eternal rule.

== Development ==
The game was first announced on 12 August 2015. It was announced that the game would launch on Kickstarter on 26 August. The game reached its $500,000 goal on Kickstarter in less than 12 hours. Some of the stretch goals were reached before they were even announced. In the end, all of the available stretch goals were met, with over 2 million dollars collected in total. Larian announced that the company decided to head to Kickstarter again because they wanted the opinions from the community when developing the game, as well as allowing them to further expand the vision they originally had for this game. The game's music was composed by Borislav Slavov, who replaced former series composer, Kirill Pokrovsky, who died in 2015.

The game was released for early access for Windows on 15 September 2016, and was fully released on 14 September 2017. Despite a power outage in Ghent on the day of launch, the location of Larian's development studio, the game was successfully released and had a concurrent player count of 75,000 within a week, becoming one of the most played games on Steam at the time. In addition to a free "enhanced edition" update for owners of the original game, it was also released on PlayStation 4 and Xbox One by Bandai Namco Entertainment on 31 August 2018. It was also released for macOS on 31 January 2019, and for the Nintendo Switch on 4 September 2019. A version for iPadOS was released on 18 May 2021.

== Reception ==
Reception

Aggregate score
Aggregator	Score
Metacritic	PC (original): 93/100; PC (Definitive Edition): 95/100; PS4: 92/100; XONE: 92/100; NS: 93/100

Review scores
Publication	Score
Destructoid	9/10
Game Informer	9.75/10
GameSpot	10/10
Hardcore Gamer	5/5
IGN	9.6/10
PC Gamer (UK)	92/100
Polygon	7/10
USgamer	5/5

Divinity: Original Sin II received "universal acclaim", according to review aggregator website Metacritic. Multiple critics and publications considered the game to be one of the best role-playing games (RPGs) of all time. Rick Lane of Eurogamer considered it a "masterpiece," thinking it would be many years before he could play another RPG that was even close to being "that rich with choice and charisma". Adam Smith of Rock, Paper, Shotgun thought that few games allowed players to take part in better tales than Original Sin II. Leif Johnson of IGN highly praised the stories, quests, tactical combat, and replayability, calling it one of the all-time greats of the RPG genre. GameSpot gave it a perfect 10/10 score, becoming only the 14th game in the publication's history to achieve that feat. Mike Williams of US Gamer called it the "pinnacle" of the computer role-playing game (CRPG) genre, praising its characters, role-playing options, environments, and combat. Janine Hawkins of Polygon was less positive than most, calling it "stunningly ambitious," but that it failed to "pull all its pieces together".

The staff of GameSpot voted Original Sin II as the fifth best game of the year, while Eurogamer ranked it 11th on their list of the "Top 50 Games of 2017".

A month after release, the game sold over 700,000 copies, with over a million sold by November 2017.

=== Accolades ===
Original version

Award	Category	Result	Ref.
British Academy Games Awards	Multiplayer	Won	
Destructoid	Best PC Game of the Year	Nominated	
Develop Awards	Music Design	Nominated	
Develop Awards	Writing or Narrative Design	Nominated	
D.I.C.E. Awards	Role-Playing Game of the Year	Nominated	
Game Audio Network Guild Awards	Best Music for an Indie Game	Nominated	
Game Audio Network Guild Awards	Best Sound Design for an Indie Game	Nominated	
The Game Awards	Best Role-Playing Game	Nominated	
Game Critics Awards	Best RPG	Nominated	
Game Critics Awards	Writing or Narrative Design	Nominated	
Game Informer	Best PC Exclusive	Won	
Game Informer	Best Co-op Multiplayer	Nominated	
Game Informer	Best Side Quests	Won	
Game Informer	Best Turn-Based Combat	Won	
Game Informer	Reader's Choice Award: Best PC Exclusive	Won	
Global Game Awards	Game of the Year	Nominated	
Global Game Awards	Best PC Exclusive	Won	
Global Game Awards	Best Co-op	Won	
Global Game Awards	Best RPG	Nominated	
IGN Awards	Game of the Year	Nominated	
IGN Awards	Best PC Game	Nominated	
IGN Awards	Best RPG	Nominated	
IGN Awards	Best Story	Nominated	
NAVGTR Awards	Best Game, Franchise Role Playing	Nominated	
NAVGTR Awards	Best Game Engineering	Nominated	
PC Gamer	Game of the Year	Won	
PC Gamer	Best Co-Op Game	Nominated	
Titanium Awards	Best Adventure/Role-Playing Game	Nominated	
Titanium Awards	Best Narrative Design	Nominated	

Definitive Edition

Award	Category	Result	Ref.
Game Critics Awards	Best RPG (PS4 and Xbox One versions only)	Nominated	
Gamescom	Best Role-Playing Game	Won	
Gamescom	Best Strategy Game	Nominated	
