= Divinity II =

2009 video game

- Ego Draconis cover art
- Developer: Larian Studios
- Publishers: Original; EU: dtp entertainment; CIS: 1C Company; US: cdv Software Entertainment; Re-release; WW: Focus Home Interactive; NA: Atlus USA; WW: Larian Studios (digital)
- Director: Swen Vincke
- Designer: Farhang Namdar
- Writer: Jan Van Dosselaer
- Composer: Kirill Pokrovsky
- Series: Divinity
- Engine: Gamebryo
- Platforms: Microsoft Windows; Xbox 360
- Release: EU: 20 November 2009; NA: 5 January 2010
- Genre: Action role-playing
- Mode: Single-player

Divinity II is an action role-playing game developed by Larian Studios. Its first release in 2009 was subtitled Ego Draconis and was published by dtp entertainment and in the United States by cdv Software Entertainment. The updated 2010 re-release The Dragon Knight Saga which included the expansion Flames of Vengeance, as well as the final 2012 release as Divinity II: Developer's Cut, were published by Focus Home Interactive.

The defining feature of Divinity II is the ability to switch between aerial combat as a dragon and more traditional third-person action-role playing gameplay as a human. It is the third game in the Divinity franchise and the first Divinity game to be released on consoles as well as for Microsoft Windows.

== Gameplay ==
The main focus of the game is on traditional action-role playing gameplay, which includes completing quests, exploring the game world and interacting with a variety of non-player characters. Divinity II utilizes some elements of games like Diablo, such as a focus on upgrading equipment, randomized magical effects on equipment, unique item sets that offer greater benefits when used together, and some quest mechanics such as markers to show that an NPC will offer a quest to the player.

It also has elements from more traditional role-playing games, such as branching conversation trees, choices that affect other events in the game, and non-combat segments, such as platforming or puzzle elements. When interacting with non-player characters, the player will often have the option to read their minds, which can provide information, extra choices in a quest, or equipment, at a certain cost to their experience points.

Players are given a choice of starting packages for their character during the tutorial, but the progression is freeform, and the player is free to develop their character in a different direction if they want to. Skills are grouped into 'schools' which correspond to traditional roles, but all skills are available to all characters, allowing mixing between these roles. Multiple forms of crafting exist: alchemy, which allows the player to create potions; necromancy, which allows a player to customize a summonable undead pet; and enchanting, which upgrades the character's equipment.

After a certain point in the game, the character gains a base of operations known as the Battle Tower, as well as the ability to become a dragon in large spaces. Dragon combat works similarly to ground-based combat, but in three dimensions; as a dragon, the character still has a regular attack as well as skills they can use, and equipment to improve their abilities.

== Plot ==
The game takes place in the world of Rivellon from Divine Divinity, although much time has passed since the end of Divine Divinity. The player character starts as a Dragon Slayer at the end of their training, when they are given draconic powers as a way to help fight the last remaining dragons. These powers also erase their memories of their training, but they are reassured that their memories will return quickly. The regular proceedings are interrupted by news of a dragon sighted nearby, so before the initiation is finished, the player character is rushed off with them to where the dragon was last seen.

Throughout the game, the hero has several encounters with Damian, the Damned One. Damian is amassing his armies of monsters to destroy Rivellon. He was driven to such actions by the death of his love, Ygerna, at the hands of his adoptive father Lucian (The Divine One, the hero from the first game). The player learns of a reversed soul forge Damian placed on him and Ygerna, meaning that resurrecting Ygerna would kill Damian. After fighting his way through Damian's evil minions and acquiring dragon knight powers, the hero discovers he was tricked into reviving Ygerna and that the reversed soul forge was never real. After reviving Ygerna, the player is stuck in a crystal prison inside the hall of echoes.

In the expansion, Flames of Vengeance, the Dragon Knight wakes in a crystal prison on the plane of Hypnoteromachia, where Lucian, the Divine, the messiah figure to Rivellon, is also imprisoned. A ghost called Behrilin comes and offers to free the Divine if the Dragon Knight will help to free him from his earthly prison. The ghost transports him to the last city in Rivellon after Damian's campaign of destruction, only still standing due to the magic shield created by the powerful wizard Zandalor. He begs the player's help to destroy the invading force and shore up the city's defenses before the shield is broken.

== Development ==
Development on Divinity II began around 2006, after Larian Studios had acquired enough money to begin development on a Divinity sequel in earnest. From the beginning, the game was planned with the feature of transforming into a dragon in mind, and even included a third form, halfway between the dragon and human forms, which would have served as a powerful form for fighting on the ground. However, it was not implemented in the final game, though the model was reused for enemies in the game. The original concepts included more areas, based on the original map of Rivellon in Divine Divinity, as well as features like a multiplayer, co-op, and greater importance given to the Battle Tower.

The game uses the Gamebryo engine, known for its use in Oblivion and Fallout 3.

After the initial release of Ego Draconis, Larian was interested in releasing an updated version that would fix many of the bugs and issues with the first game and improve the performance of the engine. At the same time, they developed an expansion that would come after the end of the game, as many people had complained that the original ending of the game had been unsatisfying. The updates to the main game and the expansion were sold together as the Flames of Vengeance add on, or bundled with the core game as The Dragon Knight Saga. Flames of Vengeance and The Dragon Knight Saga were released in Germany in August 2010 and in all other language versions in November 2010. There was no retail United States release of The Dragon Knight Saga until it was released on the Xbox 360 on 12 April 2011, along with a soundtrack CD and an art book.

For the tenth anniversary of the Divinity series and the release of the Divinity Anthology, Larian made another update to the game, calling the final version Divinity II: Developer's Cut, which included design documents, concept art, and the ability to access the developer's console in-game through a second executable file.

== Marketing ==
The Ego Draconis Windows Collector's Edition included an 18-cm resin figurine holding a metal letter opener, a cloth-map of Rivellon, a soundtrack EP with seven tracks composed by Kirill Pokrovsky and a temporary tattoo showcasing the Divinity II: Ego Draconis logo.

For the release of Divinity II: Developer's Cut on GOG.com, the website ran a promotion on a pay-what-you-want model, where people who purchased the Developer's Cut through the bundle were given early access to the bonus materials and the game itself upon release. Larian released behind-the-scenes videos when the sales numbers reached certain milestones, as well as a tech demo of their first, unfinished game, The Lady, the Mage and the Knight.

== Reception ==
Reception

Aggregate score
Aggregator	Score
Metacritic	PC: 72/100; X360: 62/100; PC (The Dragon Knight Saga): 82/100; X360 (The Dragon Knight Saga): 72/100

On Metacritic, the PC and 360 versions of Ego Draconis have an average score of 72/100 and 62/100 respectively. The Dragon Knight Saga has average scores about ten points higher, with the PC version getting an average of 82/100 and the Xbox 360 version getting an average of 72/100.

GameZone's Dan Liebman gave both the PC and Xbox 360 versions an 8.4, saying "Strong narrative and open-ended design are the highlights of this fantasy experience. Divinity II: Ego Draconis will likely be overlooked by many due to the timing of its release, but it offers a genuinely engrossing world for RPG buffs to wallow in." GameZone also gave the Dragon Knight Saga a 7 out of 10, stating "Although the graphical improvements are appreciated, newcomers expecting a visual powerhouse shouldn't get their hopes up. A good number of glitches can still be found, visual inconsistencies being one of the most striking. Your overall perception of Rivellon's scope isn't quite the same as a Bethesda RPG—it's a limited field of view, despite the actual grandeur of the world."

IGN scored it a 4.8 out of 10, stating "I can't recommend the Xbox 360 version of this product to anyone." However, in the review of The Dragon Knight Saga, another IGN reviewer stated "If you haven't touched Divinity II at all and you enjoy action-RPGs, you won't be disappointed with the Xbox 360 version."

== Sequel ==
Following the success of Divinity II: The Dragon Knight Saga, Larian expressed an interest in creating more Divinity games, while also developing the dragon gameplay that was featured in Divinity II. The action-real time strategy game was released on the 6th of August in 2013 and was titled Divinity: Dragon Commander.
