= Beyond Divinity =

2004 video game

- Developer: Larian Studios
- Publishers: EU: Ubisoft; NA: HIP Interactive; UK: Digital Jesters
- Director: Swen Vincke
- Programmer: Swen Vincke
- Composer: Kirill Pokrovsky
- Series: Divinity
- Platforms: Microsoft Windows, Mac OS X
- Release: Windows: GER: 1 April 2004; NA: 27 April 2004; EU: 30 April 2004; OS X: WW: 15 November 2013
- Genre: Action role-playing
- Mode: Single-player

Beyond Divinity is an action role-playing game by Larian Studios released in 2004. It is a sequel to Divine Divinity.

A Deluxe Edition was also released that same year, containing copies of both Beyond Divinity and Divine Divinity. In 2009 a digital download version was released, equivalent to the updated disc version. The game was released for Mac OS X on 15 November 2013.

== Gameplay ==
The gameplay is heavily based on Divine Divinity, but adds the ability for the player to control two characters, each with their own stats and equipment.

Beyond Divinity is divided into four acts; the first was designed to be relatively linear, but it opens up towards the end, and later acts have much more freedom of movement. The player can acquire a new summoning doll in each act, allowing the player to summon a specific creature, including a skeleton doll in Act 1 capable of wielding a crossbow to provide ranged support. The player can control these summons directly (and depending on the doll, even give them some of your spare equipment to use) to help in combat, or simply use to carry loot.

There is a Battlefield (an area that contains merchants and some optional, randomly generated dungeons) in each act, that, once unlocked, the player can teleport in and out of whenever they wish.

== Synopsis ==
The storyline of Beyond Divinity takes place 20 years after the original game. The player takes on the role of a servant of the divine one, a paladin who hates and hunts necromancers. During the battle with one particularly vile necromancer, the paladin is grabbed by a demon, Samuel, and dragged into another universe where he is soul-forged to a death-knight, a creature of evil. Together the paladin and death-knight must venture forth to find a way to break that forging. To succeed is to resume the path you have set for yourself. To fail is to spend eternity linked to that which you have despised.

== Reception ==
Reception

Aggregate score
Aggregator	Score
Metacritic	73/100

Review scores
Publication	Score
Computer Gaming World	3/5
GamesMaster	60%
GameSpot	7.9/10
GameSpy	4.5/5
GameZone	8/10
IGN	8/10
PC Format	59%
PC Gamer (UK)	62%
PC Gamer (US)	78%
PC Zone	71%
The Times	3/5

The game received "average" reviews according to the review aggregation website Metacritic.
