= Larian Studios =

Belgian video game developer and publisher

- Type: Private
- Industry: Video games
- Founded: 1996; 30 years ago
- Founder: Swen Vincke
- Headquarters: Ghent, Belgium
- Number of locations: 7 (2024)
- Products: Divinity series Baldur's Gate 3
- Number of employees: 530 (2025)
- Website: larian.com

Larian Studios is a Belgian independent video game developer and publisher founded in 1996 by Swen Vincke. Headquartered in Ghent, Belgium, Larian focuses on developing role-playing video games but has previously worked on educational games and casino games. It is best known for developing the Divinity series and Baldur's Gate 3.

Larian has studios in 6 other countries around the world: Quebec City (Canada), Dublin (Ireland), Kuala Lumpur (Malaysia), Guildford (United Kingdom), Barcelona (Spain), and Warsaw (Poland).

== History ==
Swen Vincke founded Larian Studios in 1996. As a lead designer in the company, he contributed to all of Larian's early game projects, including the award-winning role-playing game Divine Divinity (2002) and its sequel Beyond Divinity (2004).

Larian's first project was called The Lady, the Mage and the Knight, a game set in the world of The Dark Eye. During that time it also developed The L.E.D. Wars, a strategy game that was developed within 5 months and published by Ionos in 1997. As a result, The Lady, the Mage and the Knight soon evolved into a collaborative project between Larian Studios and Attic Entertainment Software, who released the previous The Dark Eye computer games (under the name Realms of Arkania). Due to various problems between the two development studios and its publisher, the project was abandoned in 1999.

In 2002, Larian completed work on Divinity: Sword of Lies which was published under the name Divine Divinity by CDV. In 2004, Beyond Divinity, the sequel to Divine Divinity, was published in two editions: the standard version by Ubisoft Entertainment GmbH and the deluxe version by MediaMix Benelux which contained Divine Divinity, Beyond Divinity and a novella by Rhianna Pratchett called "Son of Chaos".

Also in 2004, KetnetKick, an educational game, was developed for Ketnet and released by Transposia. In 2006, Beyond Divinity was re-released under Gold Games 9 by Ubisoft Entertainment which was a set of 10 games on 6 DVDs.

In March 2008, Adventure Rock, an online virtual world, was completed and released. This was followed by the release of KetnetKick 2 in October 2008 by VRT, the public broadcaster in Flanders. In March 2009, GulliLand was published by Jeunesse TV, a French national broadcasting channel. In January 2010, Larian released Divinity II: Ego Draconis - the sequel to Divine Divinity - to the U.S. market on Xbox 360 and Windows simultaneously, after releases in Germany, France, Spain, Italy, Poland, Russia and Benelux. Larian has also produced Divinity II: Flames of Vengeance, and built a Gold Deluxe version that holds all Divinity II episodes, called Divinity II: The Dragon Knight Saga.

In August 2013 Larian released Divinity: Dragon Commander, a game mixing strategy and role-playing elements in the Divinity universe, before the events of Divine Divinity. The game has received an overall positive reception and gained attention thanks to its novel approach to strategy.

Larian released Divinity: Original Sin, a turn-based role-playing game set between Dragon Commander and Divine Divinity, in June 2014 after several delays. The game was funded partly thanks to a Kickstarter campaign which pulled in $944,282, more than double its goal of $400,000. Original Sin was originally budgeted at €3 million, twice the amount of cash Larian had on hand, but by the time the game released Larian spent a total of €4.5 million on it; according to Swen Vincke, Larian delayed tax payments and pulled resources from Dragon Commander's development in order to fully fund and complete Original Sin, and the company would have gone bankrupt if the game had not been a success. Upon its release, Original Sin became the fastest-selling game in Larian's history. An enhanced edition was launched on 27 October 2015, including all formerly published downloadable content and several improvements. Larian began development of its Divinity Engine along with Divinity: Original Sin.

Divinity: Original Sin II, a sequel to Divinity: Original Sin, was funded through Kickstarter as well, raising the necessary amount to create the game within hours, and reaching all of its stretch goals. The game was released into Steam Early Access on 15 September 2016, with its full Version 1.0 release taking place just under one year later on 14 September 2017. An enhanced version featuring various improvements was released on 31 August 2018. At some point Tencent acquired a minority stake in the company.

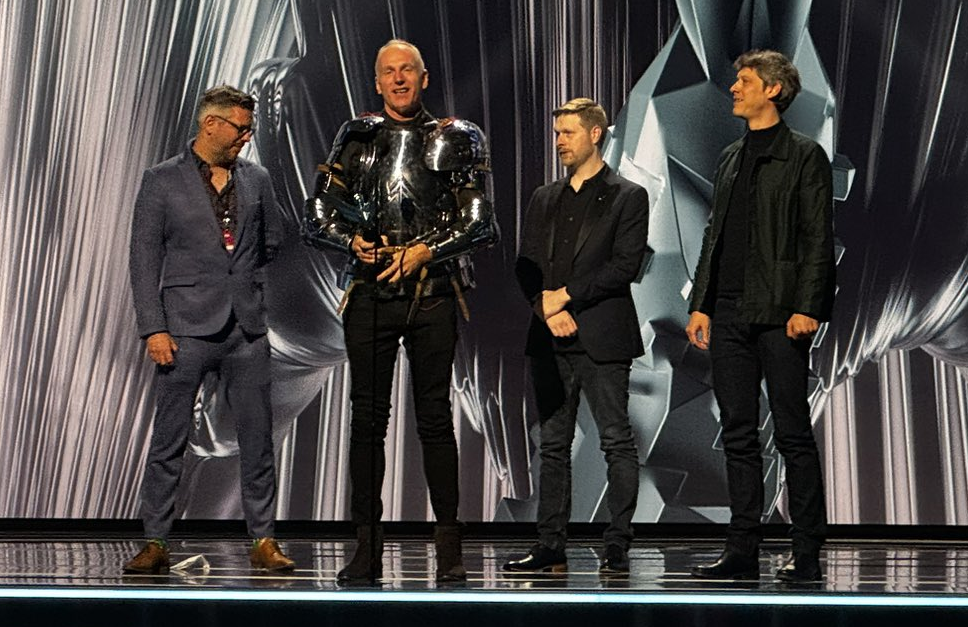
Larian staff, including Vincke, accept the Game of the Year award at the Game Awards 2023 for Baldur's Gate 3.

Larian Studios developed Baldur's Gate 3, a role-playing video game for Microsoft Windows, GNU/Linux, macOS, Xbox Series X/S, and PlayStation 5. It is the third main game in the Baldur's Gate series, itself based on the Dungeons & Dragons tabletop role-playing system. It released in early access format on PC and Mac through Steam and GOG on 6 October 2020, with a full release on 3 August 2023. The game received universal acclaim and won many awards, including several Game of the Year awards such as from The Game Awards and the D.I.C.E. Awards.

Following the release of Baldur's Gate 3, Larian began work on downloadable content for the title but canceled it. The studio considered making Baldur's Gate 4, but decided to instead work on a new project. When asked if the new project would be Divinity: Original Sin 3, Vincke could neither confirm nor deny. He did, however, say it will be "different than what you think it is" but that it's "still familiar". As of December 2025 it has been confirmed that this game is Divinity.

== Games developed ==
Year	Title	Platform(s)	Notes
1997	The L.E.D. Wars	Windows	
2002	Divine Divinity	Windows, macOS	
2004	Beyond Divinity	Windows, macOS	
2009	Divinity II: Ego Draconis	Windows, Xbox 360	The Dragon Knight Saga released in 2010, Developer's Cut released in 2012
2010	Divinity II: Flames of Vengeance	Windows, Xbox 360	Expansion pack to Divinity II
2013	Divinity: Dragon Commander	Windows	
2014	Divinity: Original Sin	Windows, PlayStation 4, Xbox One, Linux, macOS	Enhanced Edition released in 2015
2017	Divinity: Original Sin II	Windows, PlayStation 4, PlayStation 5, Xbox One, Xbox Series X/S, Nintendo Switch, Nintendo Switch 2, macOS, iPadOS	Definitive Edition released in 2018
2023	Baldur's Gate 3	Windows, PlayStation 5, macOS, Xbox Series X/S, Linux	Won Game of the Year at all 5 major video game awards.
TBA	Divinity		

Cancelled games

Year	Title	Platform(s)	Notes
1999	The Lady, the Mage and the Knight	Windows	Developed in collaboration with Attic Entertainment Software
2019	Divinity: Fallen Heroes	Windows, PlayStation 4, Xbox One	

=== Educational games ===
- Ketnet Kick (2004)
- Adventure Rock (2008)
- Ketnet Kick 2 (2008)
- GulliLand (2009)
- Superia (2009)
- Monkey Labs (2009)
- Monkey Tales (2011)
