= Adventure Rock =

- Adventure Rock Logo
- Developer(s): BBC; Larian Studios, through Vlaamse Radio- en Televisieomroep
- Publisher(s): BBC and Vlaamse Radio- en Televisieomroep
- Engine: Meqon Game Dynamics
- Platform(s): Windows
- Release: April 2008
- Genre(s): Adventure, educational
- Mode(s): Single-player

Adventure Rock (previously known as CBBC World) was a virtual online world for children based on Ketnetkick, and created by the BBC in association with Ketnet, owned and operated by the Vlaamse Radio- en Televisieomroep (VRT), Flanders' public broadcaster. The game was originally aimed at the Belgian market, but was redeveloped for a UK audience of children aged between 6–12 years old. The emphasis on the system was on safety and responsibility, with no chatrooms or the financial aspects available in other online worlds such as Linden Lab's Second Life.

Controller of CBBC Richard Deverell said:

[Adventure Rock] is a good example of the way we need to go. The thing that interests me is that children are at the vanguard. And that is where we are taking Children's BBC.

Adventure Rock was shut down in 2009 due to lack of popularity, updates and repairs.

== Gameplay ==
Screenshot from open Beta Testing of Adventure Rock

Adventure Rock consists of a large virtual world which players explore using customised avatars. They are accompanied by Cody, a floating robot who guides and helps the player.

The game starts with a tutorial in which Cody teaches the player how to control the avatar. Following that, the player is 'dropped' onto Adventure Rock, and is free to explore. There are a number of continuous tasks to do, such as collecting the hundreds of cog-shaped tokens, or pages torn from a book, the purpose of which was still unknown at the time of the game's closure. In doing these, the player gains points. There are also a number of different 'studios', including an art studio, a music studio and an animation studio, in which the player can create their own animations etc. which can then be submitted to CBBC.

There are a number of areas which were closed off, such as a roller coaster. Some of these were released over time but the game was taken down with many areas still locked.

=== Story ===
The game was based around a story narrated on the Adventure Rock website. The story section of the website states that:

A short while ago a strange rift appeared on the CBBC website leading to an unknown world. A decision was made to send in two of our hosts to study the strange world. This is the report they sent back from a world that holds more questions than answers...

The website then continues in the style of a blog written by the hosts sent to explore the world, detailing various discoveries made by the hosts. The blog goes on to detail how the hosts are returning to the studio to examine the pages found, and that they need more help, and will hence be sending in CBBC users to investigate further.

== Research ==
Adventure Rock was the subject of a year-long joint research project between CBBC and the University of Westminster, funded by BBC Future Media and Technology, and the Arts and Humanities Research Council which began in July 2007, and aims to look at how children engage with virtual worlds. It is the first time the BBC has run a structured commissioning round calling for research in partnership with academia. Adventure Rock will be studied from both an audience and producer's point of view, with the hope of finding out how children create imaginary places and spaces in the real world, how children wish Adventure Rock to develop, how producers should adapt the way they engage with children around the Adventure Rock 'brand' (which includes the service, website, message boards etc.) and what parents think of Adventure Rock (specifically whether the service changes their perception of Adventure Rock and/or virtual worlds in general).

The project will also study why the BBC chose to make Adventure Rock a closed world where users' avatars cannot meet or communicate, and what children think of this.

Research workshops have already taken place in December 2007 and January 2008, with 75 participants aged 7–11 years, in five mixed socio-economic and ethnic groups located in Scotland, Wales, N Ireland, and England. At this workshop the children were asked to talk about imaginary spaces and places, and suggest what they would like to see in a virtual world. Six weeks later, during which the children were asked to explore Adventure Rock, a second workshop was held in which the children made creative suggestions about what they would add or remove from this virtual place. Parents were asked to complete a questionnaire regarding their feelings about their children participating in this virtual world. In addition, a researcher spent time observing the producers and hosts of CBBC, completing a detailed research diary, which was then used to note congruencies and disparities between producers' expectations and children's own responses.

The findings have been presented at the Conference on Virtual Worlds for Children, on 23 May 2008.

== Reception ==
Adventure Rock received many complaints from its users. For example, on the CBBC Games Messageboards, many stated that they had problems downloading, opening or playing the game. Lack of support for these issues led to many players abandoning the game and to its eventual shutdown.
