= Kirill Pokrovsky =

Russian musician and composer (1965-2015)

Kirill Pokrovsky Покровский Кирилл Владимирович
- Born: 25 March 1962; Moscow, Russia
- Died: 1 June 2015 (aged 53) Ghent, Belgium
- Genres: Classical, world, new-age
- Occupations: Musician, composer, performer
- Website: kirillpokrovsky.de

Kirill Vladimirovich Pokrovsky (Kирилл Владимирович Покровский; 25 March 1962 – 1 June 2015) was a Russian composer and musician.

Kirill Pokrovsky learned to play and compose music from a young age, before receiving classical training at Moscow Conservatory. Between 1985 and 1989, Pokrovsky played as a keyboardist for Soviet heavy metal music bands Aria and Master. Later he moved to Belgium and wrote his first solo album called BRUGGE.

Pokrovsky had a successful career as a video game score composer. He wrote the soundtrack for the Divinity series of video games produced by Larian Studios, up until Divinity: Original Sin, which he had finished work on prior to his death.
