= Divinity: Original Sin =

2014 video game

- Developer: Larian Studios
- Publishers: Larian Studios (PC); Focus Home Interactive (PS4, XONE); JP: Spike Chunsoft (PS4)
- Director: Swen Vincke
- Producer: David Walgrave
- Designer: Farhang Namdar
- Programmer: Bert Van Semmertier
- Artist: Koen Van Mierlo
- Writers: Jan Van Dosselaer; Sarah Baylus; Swen Vincke
- Composer: Kirill Pokrovsky
- Series: Divinity
- Engine: Divinity Engine
- Platforms: Windows, OS X, Linux, PlayStation 4, Xbox One
- Release: Windows; 30 June 2014; PlayStation 4, Xbox One; 27 October 2015; Linux, OS X; 23 December 2015
- Genre: Role-playing
- Modes: Single-player, multiplayer

Divinity: Original Sin is a role-playing video game developed and published by Larian Studios. The fourth main entry in the Divinity game series, it is a prequel to the original game Divine Divinity, and to the other main games in the series. It was first released on Microsoft Windows on 30 June 2014.

Partially funded through Kickstarter, the game ships with the editor that created it, allowing players to create their own single-player and multiplayer adventures and publish them online. A re-release titled Divinity: Original Sin - Enhanced Edition, featuring an expanded storyline and new gameplay options, was released on Microsoft Windows, PlayStation 4, Xbox One, Linux, and OS X in 2015. The game received acclaim from critics, with many praising its ability to modernize the RPG genre. A sequel, Divinity: Original Sin II, was released in 2017.

== Gameplay ==
Original Sin is an RPG in the Divinity universe. Divinity: Original Sin concerns two heroes. The game touts turn-based action and adventure, cooperative multiplayer, an interactive world, and includes a modding tool used for creating new content.

== Plot ==
The customizable protagonists of the game are a pair of "Source Hunters": members of an organization dedicated to eradicating a dangerous type of magic known as "Source" and its adepts. In the single player mode, the player controls them both, while in the two-player co-op, each players takes control over one of them. At the start of the game, the Source Hunters receive orders to investigate the murder of a town councilor by a suspected Sourcerer in Cyseal, a port town in southern Rivellon. Upon arrival, they find Cyseal under siege by orcs and undead and soon discover that it was orchestrated by a Sourcerer conspiracy linked to the Immaculates, a cult based in the Luculla Forest further inland. They also find evidence implicating the White Witch, guardian of the Luculla Forest, in the murder. Their search for her takes them to the fairy realm of Hiberheim, where they find her trapped in a block of ice by the Immaculates' leader, the Conduit. Upon being freed, she introduces herself as Icara and pleads guilty of accidentally killing the councilor, but the Source Hunters, having uncovered evidence of Sourcery, mass murder, and human sacrifice carried out by the Immaculates, choose to ally themselves with her against the common foe. Icara reveals to them that the Conduit is actually her own estranged sister Leandra and directs them to infiltrate the Immaculates to learn of her plans. The Source Hunters discover that the cult has been mining a highly toxic metal named "tenebrium" in the Luculla Mines, where they also encounter "Death Knights", indestructible undead warriors created by Leandra using tenebrium and the Source to conquer Rivellon. Leandra destroys the mines in an attempt to kill the Source Hunters, but they manage to escape with her fail-safe that renders Death Knights vulnerable.

Throughout the game, the Source Hunters occasionally encounter magical crystals known as "Star Stones" (some of them transformed into "blood stones" by the Immaculates' sacrifices). Upon finding the first one, they are transported to the "Homestead", a mysterious fortress outside of regular spacetime that is immediately familiar to both of them. As they recover more Star Stones, they learn from them that the Source had originally been a benevolent magic associated with Astarte, the goddess of life, before it was corrupted by the Void, an evil force from outside of the material world. The Source Hunters themselves are revealed to be reincarnations of two ancient generals, a man and a woman, who imprisoned the Source corruption inside an artifact known as "the God Box" and were granted godlike powers to guard it. However, when a demonic being named "the Trife" persuaded Astarte to open the Box, the corruption was released again and took on the form of a giant dragon, which Astarte went on to battle for eternity in the Void. As penance for their failure, the Guardians chose to be stripped of their powers and memories and were reborn in Rivellon as ordinary humans; the Stones are, in fact, crystallized fragments of their lost memories. Deducing that the Trife is now manipulating Leandra to weaken Astarte and to unleash the Void Dragon on the world, Icara urges the Source Hunters to stop her, either by restoring the "soulforge" between the sisters (a psychic link that Leandra had severed), or by killing her if necessary.

The Source Hunters follow the Conduit's trail to the town of Hunter's Edge near the Phantom Forest, now overrun by the Immaculates, orcs, and barbarian mercenaries. They find directions left behind by the wizard Zandalor, Icara's lover and Leandra's nemesis, that point them towards an ancient Source Temple hidden deeper in the woods. Inside the Temple, they find Zandalor and learn from him that Leandra's objective is the God Box in the First Garden, which they can enter from the Homestead. In the Garden, they confront Leandra and can restore her soulforge with Icara if they have unearthed the means to do so in the Phantom Forest earlier: in this case, she recognizes how evil she has become and leaves with Icara and Zandalor to repent; otherwise, they must fight and kill her. Reaching the God Box, the Source Hunters join forces with Astarte to destroy the Trife, but not before it summons the Void Dragon itself. In a titanic battle, they manage to banish the Dragon back into the Box, and Astarte stays to guard it again for all eternity, thanking the Source Hunters and revealing to them that other gods knowingly let the Source be corrupted. The Source Hunters then leave the First Garden to embark on a new adventure.

== Development ==
A crowdfunding campaigning was launched on Kickstarter on 27 March 2013. By using the platform, Larian aimed to secure additional funds to expand the content of the game and the reactivity of the game world. The Kickstarter was successfully funded by 26 April, raising almost $950,000, with donations from other sources bringing the total to over $1,000,000 of the game's final budget of €4 million.

The game was expected to be released in late 2013, but was delayed to 28 February 2014. The release date was subsequently delayed again until 30 June 2014. Originally Larian intended to release Windows and OS X versions of the game simultaneously, and stated that once the OS X version was completed a Linux port would not be difficult. However, they decided to delay the OS X and Linux versions to focus on gameplay. Support for Linux and Mac was delivered on 23 December 2015 in the form of the Enhanced Edition of the game.

An enhanced edition version of the game, which includes new content, such as an expanded storyline and new gameplay options, was announced for the PlayStation 4 and Xbox One consoles in May 2015. The re-issue was then released for Windows on 27 October 2015, followed by Linux and OS X versions on 23 December 2015. The console version of the game was published by Focus Home Interactive. The version was also free to all the players who have already purchased the PC version of the game.

== Reception ==
Reception

Aggregate score
Aggregator	Score
Metacritic	PC: 87/100; PC (Enhanced Edition): 94/100; PS4: 88/100; XONE: 88/100

Review scores
Publication	Score
Eurogamer	9/10
GameSpot	9/10
Hardcore Gamer	4.5/5
IGN	9/10
PC Gamer (US)	87/100

Divinity: Original Sin received generally favorable reception, according to review aggregator website Metacritic, where it was Larian's highest-rated game until Original Sin II released in 2017. The game received highly positive reviews. Eurogamer described the game as "hands down the best classic-style RPG in years", and recommended the game to RPG fans, with the caveat that they should be up for a challenge. GameSpot praised the game for its complex systems, beautiful world, exciting turn-based combat, and its story. IGN wrote that the game was "one of the most rewarding RPGs to come along in years" and lauded its depth, personality, and combat challenges. PC Gamer appreciated the freedom, simulation, depth, and respect for player's choices evident in the traditional RPG. Hardcore Gamer stated that the lack of "hand holding" could discourage genre novices, and that the difficulty should be more consistent, but otherwise appreciated the game.

GameSpot named it the PC Game of the Year, while Rock, Paper, Shotgun declared it "The Best Kickstarter of 2014". During the 18th Annual D.I.C.E. Awards, the Academy of Interactive Arts & Sciences nominated Divinity: Original Sin for "Role-Playing/Massively Multiplayer Game of the Year".

Russian video game observer Tony Vilgotsky rated the game very high, saying in his review for Mir Fantastiki that Divinity: Original Sin isn't just another RPG about orcs and magic, but a really interesting world to live in.

Within a week of the game's release, the game had sold over 160,000 copies, and became Larian Studios' fastest-selling game. By September 2014, the game had sold over 500,000 copies.

== Sequel ==
A sequel to the game, titled Divinity: Original Sin II, was released on 14 September 2017.

A board game version of the game was launched on Kickstarter in November 2019.
