= List of accolades received by Baldur's Gate 3 =

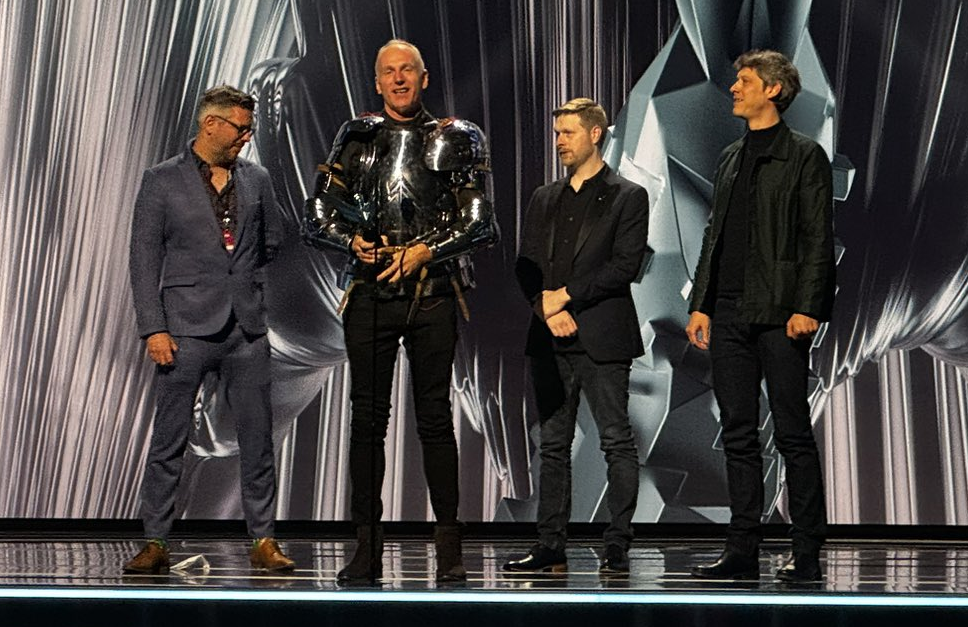
Larian Studios acceptance speech after receiving the Game of the Year award at The Game Awards 2023

Baldur's Gate 3 had record-breaking award success continuing over a year beyond its release. According to Larian CEO Swen Vincke, the company sent rotating groups of staff to award ceremonies because it started to impact the studio's development activities. In April 2024, the game became the first to win Game of the Year, or the equivalent category, at all five major ceremonies: the Golden Joystick Awards, the Game Developers Choice Awards, the D.I.C.E. Awards, the BAFTAs, and The Game Awards. Several publications also selected Baldur's Gate 3 as the best title of the year, including Ars Technica, GameSpot, GamesRadar+, and PC Gamer.

At the Golden Joystick Awards, the game broke the previous record with seven wins, including Best Storytelling, Best Visual Design, and Studio of the Year for Larian. At The Game Awards, the game won in six of the nine nominated categories, including Best Role Playing Game, Best Community Support, and Best Multiplayer Game. Baldur's Gate 3 was one of two titles to win multiple awards at the 27th Annual D.I.C.E. Awards, (Note: The other title was Marvel's Spider-Man 2; with 6 wins, it was the most-awarded title of the 2024 ceremony.) receiving Role-Playing Game of the Year alongside Outstanding Achievements in Story, Game Design, and Game Direction. At the BAFTA Game Awards, the title won five awards; lead writer Sarah Baylus and composer Borislav Slavov accepted the awards for Best Narrative and Best Music, respectively. At the 24th Game Developers Choice Awards in San Francisco, it received four awards, including Best Narrative and Best Design.

The game's performances received awards recognition. Neil Newbon (Astarion) won Best Supporting Performer at the Golden Joysticks and Best Performance at The Game Awards. Newbon shared nominated with the game's narrator, Amelia Tyler, at several ceremonies, including the New York Game Awards and the Golden Joysticks. Newbon's performance was also nominated at the DICE Awards alongside Samantha Béart (Karlach). At the BAFTAs, Newbon, Béart and Tyler were nominated for Performer in a Leading Role. There were three nominations for the Performer in a Supporting Role award: Tracy Wiles (Jaheira), Dave Jones (Halsin) and Andrew Wincott (Raphael), with Wincott's performance winning. Several awards were for BG3's LGBTQ representation. It won the GLAAD Media Award for Outstanding Video Game. At the 2024 Gayming Awards, it received four nominations, including two for Best LGBTQ Character, winning with Shadowheart, and the Game of the Year.

The game's score, and composer Borislav Slavov, received several nominations. In 2020 and 2021, he received Hollywood Music in Media Awards nominations for Original Song – Video Games ("Weeping Dawn" and "I Want to Live", respectively), and for the full score in 2023. Slavov was nominated for Best Score and Music at the Game Awards. Slavov won in the Music category at the BAFTAs.

== List ==
Awards and nominations
Date	Award	Category	Recipient(s)	Result	Ref.
2020	11th Hollywood Music in Media Awards	Original Song — Video Game	Borislav Slavov (for "Weeping Dawn")	Nominated	
2021	12th Hollywood Music in Media Awards	Original Song — Video Game	Borislav Slavov (for "I Want to Live")	Nominated	
2023	Golden Joystick Awards	Best Storytelling	Baldur's Gate 3	Won	
2023	Golden Joystick Awards	Best Game Community	Baldur's Gate 3	Won	
2023	Golden Joystick Awards	Best Visual Design	Baldur's Gate 3	Won	
2023	Golden Joystick Awards	PC Game of the Year	Baldur's Gate 3	Won	
2023	Golden Joystick Awards	Studio of the Year	Larian Studios	Won	
2023	Golden Joystick Awards	Best Supporting Performer	Amelia Tyler (Narrator)	Nominated	
2023	Golden Joystick Awards	Best Supporting Performer	Neil Newbon (Astarion)	Won	
2023	Golden Joystick Awards	Ultimate Game of the Year	Baldur's Gate 3	Won	
2023	14th Hollywood Music in Media Awards	Original Score — Video Game	Borislav Slavov	Nominated	
2023	The Game Awards 2023	Game of the Year	Baldur's Gate 3	Won	
2023	The Game Awards 2023	Best Game Direction	Baldur's Gate 3	Nominated	
2023	The Game Awards 2023	Best Narrative	Baldur's Gate 3	Nominated	
2023	The Game Awards 2023	Best Community Support	Baldur's Gate 3	Won	
2023	The Game Awards 2023	Best Role Playing Game	Baldur's Gate 3	Won	
2023	The Game Awards 2023	Best Multiplayer Game	Baldur's Gate 3	Won	
2023	The Game Awards 2023	Player's Voice	Baldur's Gate 3	Won	
2023	The Game Awards 2023	Best Score and Music	Borislav Slavov	Nominated	
2023	The Game Awards 2023	Best Performance	Neil Newbon	Won	
2023	The Vtuber Awards	Stream Game of The Year	Baldur's Gate 3	Nominated	
2023	The Steam Awards	Game of the Year	Baldur's Gate 3	Won	
2023	The Steam Awards	Outstanding Story-Rich Game	Baldur's Gate 3	Won	
2023	The Streamer Awards	Stream Game of the Year	Baldur's Gate 3	Nominated	
2024	New York Game Awards	Big Apple Award for Game of the Year	Baldur's Gate 3	Won	
2024	New York Game Awards	Herman Melville Award for Best Writing in a Game	Baldur's Gate 3	Won	
2024	New York Game Awards	Statue of Liberty Award for Best World	Baldur's Gate 3	Nominated	
2024	New York Game Awards	Tin Pan Alley Award for Best Music in a Game	Baldur's Gate 3	Nominated	
2024	New York Game Awards	Great White Way Award for Best Acting in a Game	Amelia Tyler (Narrator)	Nominated	
2024	New York Game Awards	Great White Way Award for Best Acting in a Game	Neil Newbon (Astarion)	Nominated	
2024	27th Annual D.I.C.E. Awards	Game of the Year	Swen Vincke, David Walgrave	Won	
2024	27th Annual D.I.C.E. Awards	Role-Playing Game of the Year	Swen Vincke, David Walgrave	Won	
2024	27th Annual D.I.C.E. Awards	Outstanding Achievement in Game Direction	Swen Vincke	Won	
2024	27th Annual D.I.C.E. Awards	Outstanding Achievement in Game Design	Nick Pechenin, Edouard Imbert, Farhang Namdar	Won	
2024	27th Annual D.I.C.E. Awards	Outstanding Achievement in Character	Astarion (Neil Newbon, Adam Smith, Chrystal Ding, Stephen Rooney)	Nominated	
2024	27th Annual D.I.C.E. Awards	Outstanding Achievement in Character	Karlach (Samantha Béart, Adam Smith, Chrystal Ding, Sarah Baylus)	Nominated	
2024	27th Annual D.I.C.E. Awards	Outstanding Achievement in Story	Adam Smith, Chrystal Ding	Won	
2024	35th GLAAD Media Awards	Outstanding Video Game	Baldur's Gate 3	Won	
2024	24th Game Developers Choice Awards	Game of the Year	Baldur's Gate 3	Won	
2024	24th Game Developers Choice Awards	Best Audio	Baldur's Gate 3	Nominated	
2024	24th Game Developers Choice Awards	Best Design	Baldur's Gate 3	Won	
2024	24th Game Developers Choice Awards	Innovation Award	Baldur's Gate 3	Nominated	
2024	24th Game Developers Choice Awards	Best Narrative	Baldur's Gate 3	Won	
2024	24th Game Developers Choice Awards	Social Impact Award	Baldur's Gate 3	Nominated	
2024	24th Game Developers Choice Awards	Best Technology	Baldur's Gate 3	Nominated	
2024	24th Game Developers Choice Awards	Audience Award	Baldur's Gate 3	Won	
2024	20th British Academy Games Awards	Best Game	Baldur's Gate 3	Won	
2024	20th British Academy Games Awards	Animation	Baldur's Gate 3	Longlisted	
2024	20th British Academy Games Awards	Artistic Achievement	Baldur's Gate 3	Nominated	
2024	20th British Academy Games Awards	Audio Achievement	Baldur's Gate 3	Longlisted	
2024	20th British Academy Games Awards	Game Design	Baldur's Gate 3	Longlisted	
2024	20th British Academy Games Awards	Multiplayer	Baldur's Gate 3	Nominated	
2024	20th British Academy Games Awards	Music	Borislav Slavov	Won	
2024	20th British Academy Games Awards	Narrative	Baldur's Gate 3	Won	
2024	20th British Academy Games Awards	Performer in a Leading Role	Amelia Tyler (Narrator)	Nominated	
2024	20th British Academy Games Awards	Performer in a Leading Role	Neil Newbon (Astarion)	Nominated	
2024	20th British Academy Games Awards	Performer in a Leading Role	Samantha Béart (Karlach)	Nominated	
2024	20th British Academy Games Awards	Performer in a Supporting Role	Andrew Wincott (Raphael)	Won	
2024	20th British Academy Games Awards	Performer in a Supporting Role	Tracy Wiles (Jaheira)	Nominated	
2024	20th British Academy Games Awards	Performer in a Supporting Role	Dave Jones (Halsin)	Longlisted	
2024	20th British Academy Games Awards	Technical Achievement	Baldur's Gate 3	Longlisted	
2024	20th British Academy Games Awards	EE Game of the Year	Baldur's Gate 3	Won	
2024	Webby Awards	Best Game Design	Baldur's Gate 3	Won	
2024	Webby Awards	Best Game Design (People's Voice)	Baldur's Gate 3	Won	
2024	Webby Awards	Independent Creator	Baldur's Gate 3	Won	
2024	Webby Awards	Independent Creator (People's Voice)	Baldur's Gate 3	Won	
2024	Gayming Awards	Game of the Year	Baldur's Gate 3	Won	
2024	Gayming Awards	Readers Award	Baldur's Gate 3	Won	
2024	Gayming Awards	Authentic Representation Award	Baldur's Gate 3	Nominated	
2024	Gayming Awards	Best LGBTQ Character	Dame Aylin	Nominated	
2024	Gayming Awards	Best LGBTQ Character	Shadowheart	Won	
2024	Gayming Awards	Industry Diversity Award	Larian Studios	Nominated	
2024	Nebula Awards	Best Game Writing	Adam Smith, Adrienne Law, Baudelaire Welch, Chrystal Ding, Ella McConnell, Ine Van Hamme, Jan Van Dosselaer, John Corcoran, Kevin VanOrd, Lawrence Schick, Martin Docherty, Rachel Quirke, Ruairí Moore, Sarah Baylus, Stephen Rooney, Swen Vincke	Won	
2024	Hugo Awards	Best Game or Interactive Work	Baldur's Gate 3	Won	
2024	The Game Awards 2024	Best Community Support	Baldur's Gate 3	Won	
2024	The Steam Awards	Labor of Love	Baldur's Gate 3	Nominated	
2025	The Game Awards 2025	Best Community Support	Baldur's Gate 3	Won	
2025	The Steam Awards	Labor of Love	Baldur's Gate 3	Won	

== Bibliography ==
- Bankhurst, Adam (16 February 2024). "DICE Awards 2024 Winners: The Full List". IGN. Archived from the original on 16 February 2024.
- Dunn, Jack; Malkin, Marc (2024-03-15). "'Yellowjackets,' 'Ted Lasso,' 'Bottoms' and Reneé Rapp Win Top Prizes at GLAAD Media Awards". Variety.
- Jones, Ali (2024-07-14). "Baldur's Gate 3 won so many awards that it started to "affect development"". GamesRadar+.
- Gerken, Tom; Cieslak, Marc (2024-04-11). "Bafta Games Awards 2024: Baldur's Gate 3 wins game of the year". BBC News.
- "2021 Music in Visual Media Nominations". Hollywood Music In Media Awards. 2021.
- "2023 HMMA Winners and Nominees". Hollywood Music In Media Awards. 2021.
- "2024 Hugo Awards". World Science Fiction Society. 2024-08-11. Archived from the original on 30 March 2024.
- Loveridge, Sam (2023-11-10). "Here are all the Golden Joystick Awards 2023 winners". GamesRadar+.
- Makuch, Eddie (7 December 2023). "All The Game Awards 2023 Winners Revealed". GameSpot. Archived from the original on 8 December 2023.
- MacDonald, Keza (2024-03-07). "Bafta games awards 2024: Baldur's Gate, Spider-Man and Alan Wake lead nominations". The Guardian.
- Orland, Kyle (2023-12-27). "Ars Technica's best video games of 2023". Ars Technica.
- Ramée, Jordan (2023-12-06). "Baldur's Gate 3 Is GameSpot's Game Of The Year 2023". GameSpot.
- Savage, Phil (2023-12-30). "Game of the Year 2023: Baldur's Gate 3". PC Gamer.
- Serin, Kaan (2024-04-12). "Baldur's Gate 3 passes Elden Ring and Breath of the Wild to become first game to win all five major GOTY awards". GamesRadar+.
- West, Josh (2023-02-01). "The 25 best games of 2023". GamesRadar+.
