= Neil Roberts (actor) =

English actor

- Born: Singapore
- Education: Bristol Old Vic Theatre School
- Occupation: Actor
- Years active: 1986–present
- Spouse: Dianne Pilkington (2020–present)
- Website: www.neilroberts.co.uk

Neil Roberts is an English actor, known for portraying Rex Buckland in Charmed, Gavin Arnold in Family Affairs, Richard in Disney's Life Bites, DS Jason Wise in Emmerdale, Glenn Donovan in Hollyoaks and the default voice of The Dark Urge in Baldur's Gate 3.

== Life and career ==
Roberts trained at the Bristol Old Vic Theatre School; following his graduation, he played the titular role in various productions of Hamlet. Roberts' is best known for the recurring role of Rex Buckland in Charmed and as the default voice for The Dark Urge character in the game Baldur's Gate 3. In 2024 Roberts was cast as the barrister Warren Finn in EastEnders.

From 2016 to 2023, he appeared in the ITV soap opera Emmerdale as DS Jason Wise. In 2016, he appeared in an episode of the BBC soap opera Doctors as Ricky Delaine. He returned to the role in 2021. In 2017, Roberts appeared in the Channel 4 soap opera Hollyoaks as Glenn Donovan. Other credits include secret agent Max Meltus in the television advertisements for cough medicine Meltus, and a 1998 commercial for Nescafé Gold Blend, opposite Simone Bendix in the last Gold Blend couple ads. Roberts married actress Dianne Pilkington in September 2020.

== Filmography ==
=== Television ===
Year	Title	Role	Notes
1993	Crime Story: The White House Farm Murders	Jeremy Bamber	Television film
1994	A Breed of Heroes	Lieutenant Philip Lamb	Television film
1995	Just William	PC Jones	Recurring role
1996	Party of Five	Gary Prescott	Episode: "Not So Fast"
1996	Sliders	Ted Bernsen	Episode: "Season's Greetings"
1996	Public Morals	Guy	Episode: "The Goldenrod Cover"
1997	Baywatch Nights	John	Episode: "Mobius"
1997	The Second Civil War	Tony Phillips	Television film
1997	Diagnosis Murder	Dr Shurmur	Episode: "Looks Can Kill"
1997	Babylon 5	Brother Michael	Episode: "The Deconstruction of Falling Stars"
1998	Beverly Hills, 90210	Jacob Wallenfels	2 episodes
1998	Nick Fury: Agent of S.H.I.E.L.D.	Alexander Goodwin Pierce	Television film
1998	Charmed	Rex Buckland	Recurring role
1998	Privates	Jim	Main role
2000	The Bill	James Spiller	2 episodes
2001	Family Affairs	Gavin Arnold	Series regular
2003	Keen Eddie	Nicholas Ritter	Episode: "Achtung Baby"
2003	Doctors	Harry Mawer	Episode: "An Early Frost"
2003	Holby City	Duncan Lewis	Episode: "Just Getting By"
2005	Love Soup	Clive	2 episodes
2005	The Impressionists	Durranty	Main role
2006	Holby City	Dr Philip Lawlor	Recurring role
2006	Mayo	Dr Sebastian Oliver	1 episode
2007	Doctors	Laurent Cohen	Episode: "Ménage à Trois"
2008	Life Bites	Richard	Main role
2010	Doctors	James Forth	Episode: "Legacy"
2010	I Shouldn't Be Alive	Eddie	Episode: "Boys Adrift"
2010	New Tricks	Anthony Vernon	Episode: "Left Field"
2011–2012	Coronation Street	Mike Leydon	Recurring role
2016, 2021	Doctors	Ricky Delaine	Recurring role
2016–2017, 2019–2020, 2023	Emmerdale	DS Jason Wise	Recurring role
2017	Hollyoaks	Glenn Donovan	Series regular
2019	Whiskey Cavalier	Rodney Seagel	Episode: "Two of a Kind"
2020	Endeavour	Oberon Prince	Episode: "Raga"
2024	EastEnders	Warren Finn	Recurring role

=== Film ===
Year	Title	Role	Notes
2002	Killing Me Softly	Philip	Uncredited
2007	IntraVenus	James	Short film
2012	History of Chance	Tom Candle	Short film
2016	Mum's List	Professor Mike Stevens	Feature
2016	Vernon Walks	Herbert	Paramount short film
2018	Eighteen Weeks	Mike	Short film
2018	Sorceress	Husband	Short film

== Theatre credits ==
Year	Show	Role(s)	Venue(s)
	'Tis Pity She's a Whore	Giovanni	New Prospect Theatre
	The Jungle Book	Mowgli	Other Place RSC
	Salad Days	Timothy	UK Tour
	Forty Years On	Tupper	Salisbury Playhouse
	Robin Hood	Much the Miller	Nottingham Playhouse
	Hamlet	Hamlet	Edinburgh Festival
	Winnie the Pooh	Christopher Robin	UK tour
	Winnie the Pooh	Christopher Robin	Royalty Theatre, WEST END
	A Single Man	Kenny	Greenwich Theatre
	Here Come the Clowns	Lew	King's Head Theatre
	As You Like It	Silvius	Greenwich Theatre
	Post Mortem	Babe	King's Head Theatre
	The Prisoner's of War	Lt. Grayle	Hampstead Theatre
	On Approval	Duke of Bristol	Watermill Theatre, Newbury
	Ellergies for Angels Punks & Raging Queens	Dwight	Criterion Theatre, WEST END
	Love for Love	Valentine Legend	Hampstead Theatre
	My Cousin Rachel	Philip	Windsor Theatre
	Murder in Green Meadows	Thomas	Vienna Theatre
2009	Beauty & the Beast	Eugene	Imagine Theatre Company
2010	Night Fright	Frank Gilman	Nottingham Playhouse
2010–2011	Who Killed "Agatha" Christie	Arthur Christie	UK tour
2011	Wind in the Willows	Ratty	Basingstoke Theatre
2011	The Sound of Music	Captain Von Trapp	Asia tour
2012–2014	Mamma Mia!	Harry	Prince of Wales Theatre & Novello Theatre, WEST END
2015	The End of the Affair	Maurice Bendrix	UK tour
2015	Sherlock Holmes	Anderson	UK tour
2016	Dealer's Choice	Stephen	Brighton Theatre
2016	Jekyll & Hyde	Anderson	UK tour
2016–2017	Mary Poppins	Mr. Banks	UK & International tour
2018	Rain Man	Dr Vern Bruener	UK tour

== Video games ==
Year	Title	Role	Studio
2021	Hood: Outlaws & Legends	Guard	Sumo Newcastle
2022	The Lord of the Rings: Gollum	Gwendil & Ork	Daedalic Entertainment
2023	Baldur's Gate 3	The Dark Urge (default) & TAV 5	Larian Studios
2024	Eiyuden Chronicle: Hundred Heroes	Squash & Sallas Baelrant	Rabbit & Bear Studios and 505 Games
