= 1348 Ex Voto =

2026 video game

- Developer: Sedleo
- Publisher: Dear Villagers
- Composers: Cassie White; Todd Brand
- Engine: Unreal Engine 5
- Platforms: PlayStation 5; Windows
- Release: March 12, 2026
- Genre: Action-adventure game
- Mode: Single-player

1348 Ex Voto is a third-person action-adventure game developed by the 15 person indie team Sedleo, set in 14th-century Italy. It released for PlayStation 5 and Windows on March 12, 2026.

== Gameplay ==
Players take control of Aeta (voiced by Alby Baldwin), a young knight errant who sets off on a brutal quest to find and save her closest one, Bianca (voiced by Jennifer English). Gameplay is based around sword combat and exploration of medieval Italy.

== Reception ==
Reception

Aggregate scores
Aggregator	Score
Metacritic	(PS5) 45/100 (PC) 50/100
OpenCritic	7% recommend

Review scores
Publication	Score
The A.V. Club	D−
GamesRadar+	3/5
IGN	4/10
TechRadar	3/5
The Games Machine (UK)	8/10
GameMAG	6/10
Metro	5/10

The game received "mixed or average reviews" from critics according to review aggregator Metacritic, with an average critics' score of 50 based on 18 reviews. Review aggregator OpenCritic also reported a top critic average of 50 based on 28 reviews, with only 7% of critics recommending the game.

The game received praise for its visuals and acting, while also being criticised for its combat system, technical performance and overall polish at launch.

Jarret Green of IGN said that the game's opening gave "a strong first impression" with its "gorgeous landscapes, gripping acting, and historically inspired combat animations" but that the rest of the game failed to live up to its opening promise, criticising its "shoddy combat" and lack of interactivity and variety, while acknowledging its visual quality and direction.

Before launch, the game was heavily attacked by far-right influencers over a perceived lesbian romance that was not present in the final game. On release, this led to a coordinated "anti-woke" review bombing campaign, resulting in overwhelmingly negative Matacritic user score; as well as further attacks directed at the developers, from false claims of government funding to death threats.
