= Tides of Annihilation =

- Developer: Eclipse Glow Games
- Publisher: Eclipse Glow Games
- Director: Ary Chen
- Producer: Kun Fu
- Artist: Yuhang Zou
- Composer: Caisheng Bo
- Engine: Unreal Engine 5
- Platforms: PlayStation 5; Windows; Xbox Series X/S
- Genre: Action-adventure
- Mode: Single-player

Tides of Annihilation (Note: Simplified Chinese: 湮灭之潮; traditional Chinese: 湮滅之潮; pinyin: Yānmiè Zhī Cháo.) is an upcoming fantasy action-adventure game developed and published by the Chinese studio Eclipse Glow Games. The player assumes the role of Gwendolyn, the lone survivor of an otherworldly invasion that fractured London. Set in the modern city of London and the mythical realm of Avalon, the story follows her quest to find the Holy Grail in a bid to save her sister, restore the world, and exact vengeance on the demi-gods of Avalon. The game is inspired by Arthurian legend.

Tides of Annihilation is scheduled to be released for PlayStation 5, Windows, and Xbox Series X/S. Its release date has not been announced yet.

== Gameplay ==
Tides of Annihilation is an action-adventure game. It is played in single-player mode from a third-person perspective.

The player controls Gwendolyn, the lone survivor of an otherworldly invasion that fractured London. She has the ability to summon and command the Knights of the Round Table. One such knight is Lamorak, who wields a spear. Two sets, each comprising two knights, can be set up at a time. Each set consists of a main knight and a sub knight. Each knight's configuration and abilities are customisable. It is possible to quickly switch between the sets.

In addition, Gwendolyn can perform light attacks, heavy attacks, jumps, dodges, deflects, and executions.

Folded realms, which are otherworldly spaces, will be encountered along the quest. A trailer showed an example of a knights combat mechanic in which Gwendolyn and Lamorak could be controlled simultaneously to fight Tyronoe outside and inside a mirror space folded realm, respectively, with Gwendolyn unable to access the realm until its barrier is shattered.

The game features a relatively linear story. It is structured by levels that serve to advance the story and contain spaces for exploration. The knights possess skills that support the exploration. For example, Bors can shoot arrows used to attach ziplines for traversing distances and cleave through ropes suspending objects, while Palamedes can break through walls and move heavy objects.

The game has multiple difficulty options.

== Synopsis ==
=== Setting ===
Tides of Annihilation is a fantasy game that blends elements of medieval fantasy with a contemporary setting. It is inspired by Arthurian legend. For example, Gwendolyn is able to summon and command the Knights of the Round Table.

The game takes place in the modern city of London and the mythical realm of Avalon. The city lies fractured following an otherworldly invasion. Its environment is roamed by Colossal Knights, which are towering entities that serve as vertical challenges that can be explored, interacted with, and ultimately battled. Kun Fu said that "Our game world reimagines London as a sprawling battleground where modern ruins coexist with echoes of a medieval past. Imagine the city as a giant tree, its branches representing iconic districts and landmarks—each twisted and transformed by the otherworldly invaders."

Ary Chen said that "At its heart, this is Gwendolyn's heroic saga. We envisioned a protagonist who combines strength with grace and can fight shoulder to shoulder with her Knights. That idea is a core pillar of both the narrative and our combat design. We wanted Gwen to have a commanding presence—not simply through her appearance, but through her actions, personality, and role within the world." Angela Sant'Albano said that "I am beyond thrilled—and deeply honored—to officially announce that I'm stepping into the role of Gwendolyn in Tides of Annihilation. Gwen is the kind of heroine I love. She carries self-doubt, constantly questioning whether she's enough, but she refuses to let fear make her stand still. Everything she does is driven by love for her sister and her homeland, and I think that's what makes her strength feel so human. Getting to step into her boots, facing otherworldly demigods, and commanding Knights of the Round Table has been an absolute privilege."

=== Plot ===
Gwendolyn is the lone survivor of an otherworldly invasion that fractured London. She discovers and controls the mysterious power of the Fog, a power that once only King Arthur could control, which enables her to summon and command the Knights of the Round Table. The Fog has devoured London and is tearing Avalon apart. Amid the ruins of the city, Gwendolyn is distraught over the loss of her sister and the calamity that befell the city, but Guinevere guides her to harness the power of the Fog to save London and Avalon from annihilation. Gwendolyn sets out on a quest to find the Holy Grail in a bid to save her sister, restore the world, and exact vengeance on the demi-gods of Avalon.

== Development ==
Tides of Annihilation is a game developed and published by Eclipse Glow Games. The studio is based in Chengdu, China. The game is the studio's debut title. It is made with investment from Tencent. It is built using Unreal Engine 5.

Eclipse Glow Games began developing Tides of Annihilation in early 2023. The project's starting point was the action-adventure genre, with action as the foremost element and combat as the core. The core gameplay concept, which became the knights combat system, preceded the choice of the Arthurian theme. The developers initially envisioned a combat system in which the protagonist leads a group of companions into battle. As the idea evolved, they felt that the role resembled a commander of knights akin to King Arthur and therefore adopted the theme.

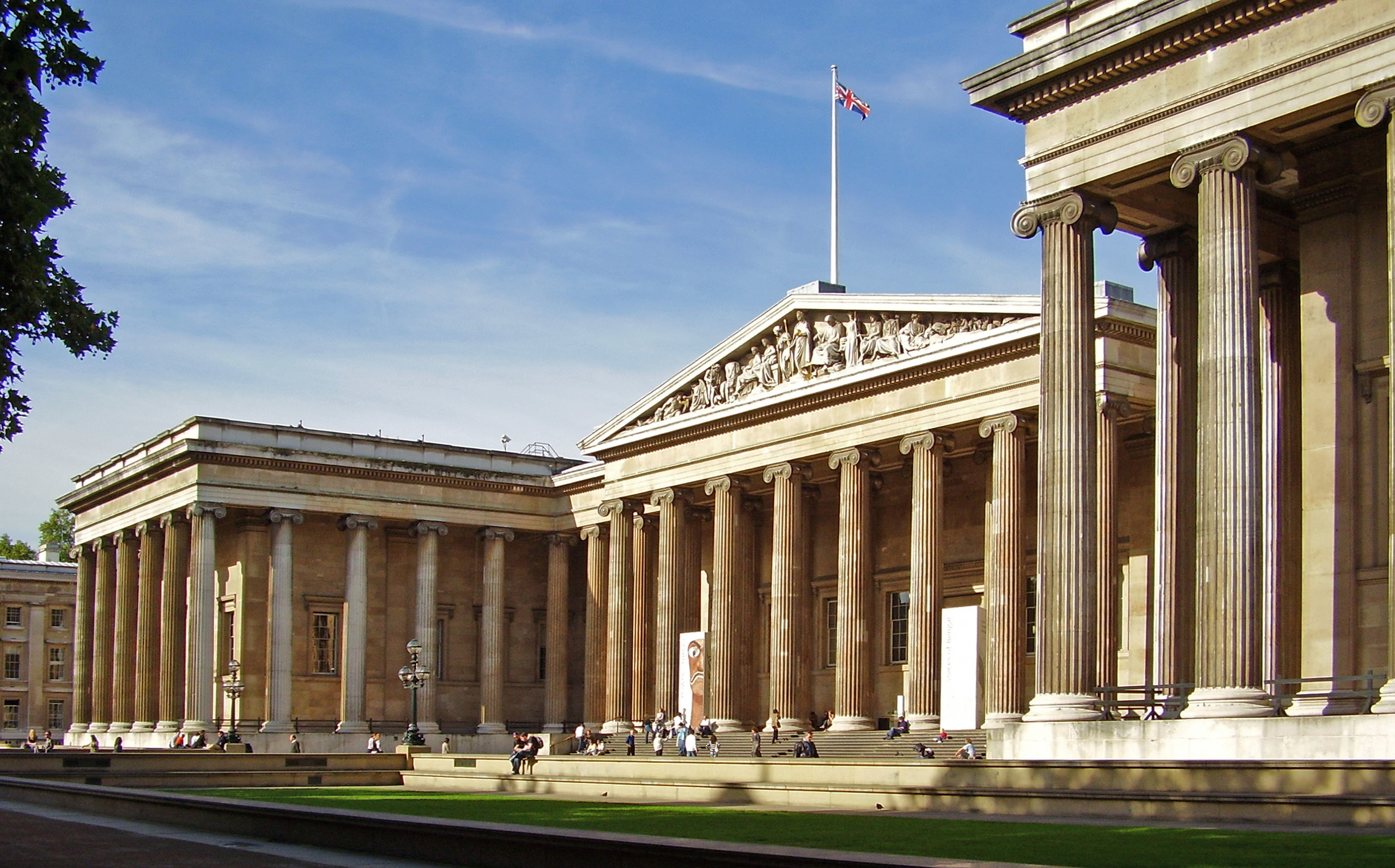
The Great Russell Museum is a location inspired by the real-life British Museum in London.

The development team was supported by Tsinghua University's Academy of Arts & Design in conducting in-depth research into British culture. For instance, accompanied by local writers, scholars, and museum directors, both the development and academic teams carried out on-site studies in London. The British Museum, Buckingham Palace, and Westminster Abbey were a few of the visited places. During an interview at the Game Developers Conference 2025, Ary Chen remarked that "Because the legend of King Arthur is a Western story, as a Chinese studio, we need to think about how to reinterpret the culture and how to tell a good story with it. That is something we are constantly working on. We want to truly respect the British culture and the legends of King Arthur, so in order to tell a good story, we've been referencing a lot of books and materials and consulting with experts in these fields. Last year, the team actually went to London to do a small-scale playtest and they also did sightseeing to actually see these historic locations."

In terms of art and design, the developers employed an East Asian ink wash style and aimed to convey a sense of withering in the overall atmosphere. In terms of music, they sought to create an immersive auditory experience that conveys a fractured European setting.

In February 2025, it was shared that Jennifer English would voice the protagonist Gwendolyn and Aliona Baranova would voice the antagonist Mordred. This was shortly after their performances were heard in the reveal trailer. During an interview at the Golden Joystick Awards 2025, English said that "We haven't really started recording yet. I'm so excited to see what they have in store." During an interview in late 2025, Kun Fu said that voice production is typically a process that should be carried out at the final stages of development, since the recording and implementation require an in-depth understanding of the characters. During the interview, he added that it is still in an adjustment phase and would continue to improve with the performances featured in promotional material. In July 2026, it was disclosed that English had stepped away from the role of Gwendolyn due to personal health reasons, but remained with the project in an advisory role. In June, she informed the studio of her circumstances. She and the remaining voice cast members helped the studio identify and connect with potential performers for the role. By the time that the news was disclosed, the studio had already found an actress whose then-recent work "left a strong impression on both Jennifer and our team—not only for the performance itself, but for the remarkable care and dedication she showed in understanding the character." During Gamescom Opening Night Live 2026, it was revealed that Angela Sant'Albano would voice Gwendolyn.

During an interview in August 2026, Kun Fu addressed perceived issues regarding Gwendolyn's facial appearance in the 2026 offline hands-on game demo. He said that her face shape is consistent between the then-latest promotional video, which used real-time rendering, and the game demo. He explained that the team aimed for smoother lighting optimisation, which led to some differences and imperfections. He added that the version used in the demo may have been a bit rushed and that the facial rendering under lighting would be further optimised. Around the same time, the studio confirmed that Gwendolyn's character model had not been altered following the project's initial reveal and would not undergo major changes, but that details such as lighting and textures are continually refined.

== Release ==
Tides of Annihilation is scheduled to be released for PC, PlayStation 5, and Xbox Series X/S. Its release date has not been announced yet.

Eclipse Glow Games unveiled Tides of Annihilation with a trailer during Sony's State of Play on 12 February 2025.

== Reception ==
=== Accolades ===
Ceremony	Category	Result	Ref.
Gamecom Award 2026	Most Epic	Won	
Gamecom Award 2026	Best Sony PlayStation Game	Nominated	
