= Jennifer English =

British actress

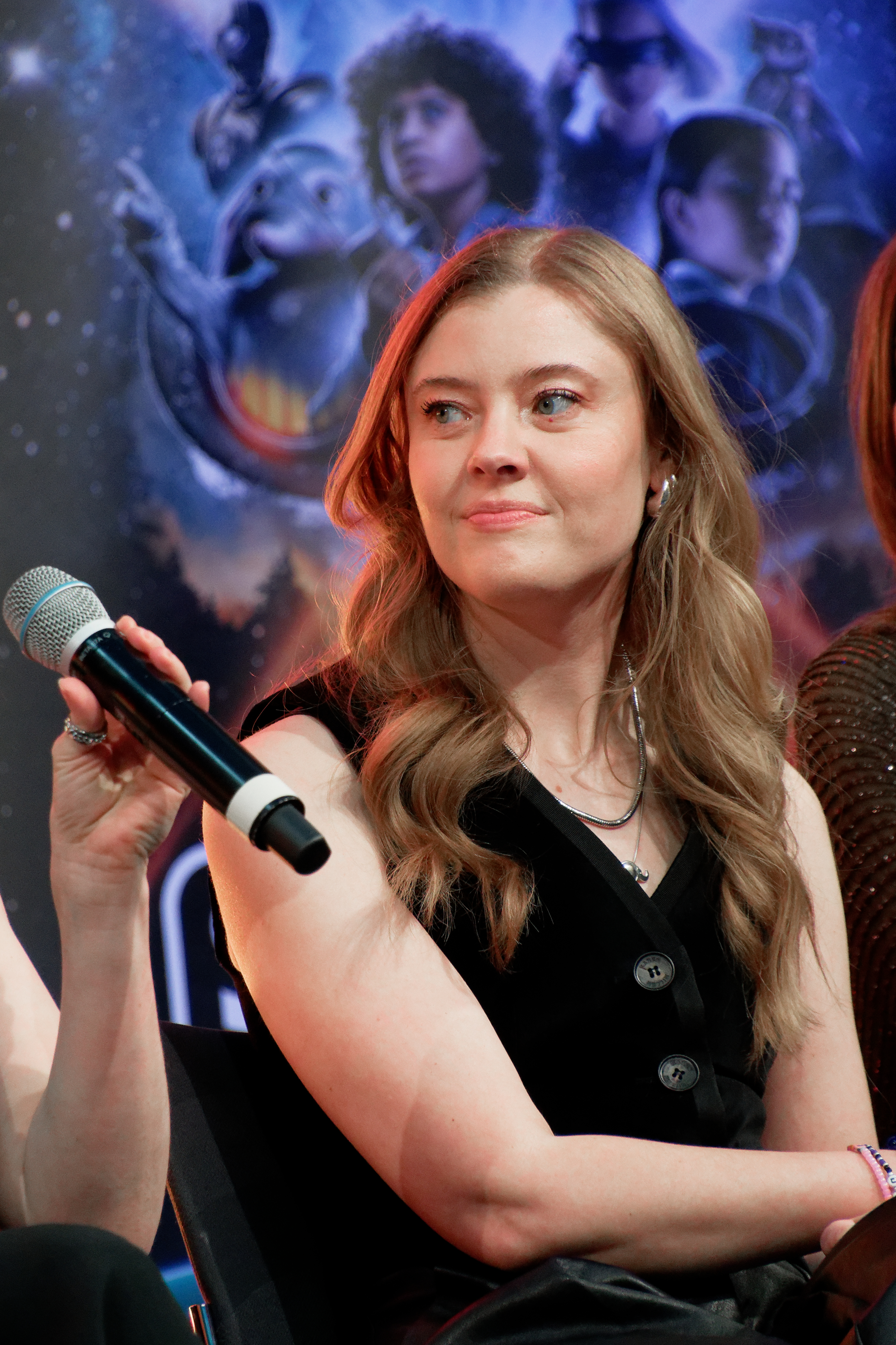
- English at ComicCon in Stuttgart in 2024
- Education: Royal Birmingham Conservatoire
- Occupations: Actress; Voice actress Motion-capture actress
- Years active: 2015–present

Jennifer English is an English actress best known for her voice acting work in video games. Her roles include Latenna the Albinauric in Elden Ring (2022), Shadowheart in Baldur's Gate 3 (2023), Carlotta in Wuthering Waves (2024) and Maelle in Clair Obscur: Expedition 33 (2025).

Her voice performance as Maelle in Clair Obscur: Expedition 33 earned her the awards for "Best Performance" at The Game Awards 2025, Performer in a Leading Role at the 22nd British Academy Games Awards, and "Best Lead Performer" at the Golden Joystick Awards 2025. She, additionally, received a nomination for Outstanding Achievement in Character for the same performance at the 29th Annual D.I.C.E. Awards. English had also been, in the previous year, listed among the twenty BAFTA "2024 UK Breakthrough" talents in recognition of her portrayal of Shadowheart in Baldur's Gate 3.

== Early life and education ==
English is from rural Shropshire. She enjoyed playing videogames as a child, including The Sims, Spyro, Wacky Races, and Soul Blade. She graduated from the Royal Birmingham Conservatoire in 2012.

== Career ==
English began her career in theatre in 2015, with roles in productions of Abyss at Arcola Theatre and Future Conditional at The Old Vic. English's first video game voice acting role was in Divinity: Original Sin II (2017), a role-playing game developed by Larian Studios, where she played about seventy different characters. She voiced Latenna the Albinauric in Elden Ring (2022).

English reunited with Larian Studios when she joined the cast of Baldur's Gate 3 (2023). She portrayed the half-elf cleric Shadowheart, providing both voice acting and motion capture performances for the character. The character is considered a fan favorite among the game's audience and by English herself, who enjoyed the authenticity and complexity of the relationship players can have when becoming friends with or romancing Shadowheart. English also enjoyed that Larian listened to feedback from fans and English herself in developing the character. In 2024, she was selected as one of the twenty BAFTA Breakthrough UK participants for her role in the game. When asked about reprising the role in a future instalment of the series, she said that she would consider it "only if it honors her in a way I think we would all be proud of."

She voiced Maelle in the 2025 video game Clair Obscur: Expedition 33. She participated in blind auditions for the role before being cast. The game's development team added a "story mode" difficulty setting with less challenging combat after English told them that she wanted to play the game, but could not complete it unless there was an easy mode. Her performance received acclaim from critics, and Tessa Kaur of TheGamer called her character "the emotional core" of the game. She won the "Best Performance" award at The Game Awards 2025 for her role in Expedition 33.

English hosted the Future Games Show Spring showcase in 2025. In February 2025, she was announced to be playing the lead role, Gwendolyn, in the upcoming video game Tides of Annihilation. However in June 2026, she stepped down from the role for personal health reasons, while remaining attached to the project in an advisory role and personally recommending actress Angela Sant'Albano to the developers as a replacement.

In November 2025, English announced that she will play the role of Empress Alora in the upcoming video game Soulframe, and her voice can already be heard in the game's playable pre-alpha version.

== Personal life ==
English is a lesbian. She feels the gaming industry has made great progress in LGBTQ+ representation, and specifically loves the representation Larian Studios has included in Baldur's Gate 3, but states that the gaming industry could always use more. English further explained that she used the game to explore her own identity. She was in a relationship with Aliona Baranova, one of the motion capture performance directors for Baldur's Gate 3. The relationship ended in March 2026. The pair had a joint Twitch account called JenandAliona.

In 2021, English was diagnosed with ADHD.

== Works ==
Key
†	Productions that have not yet been released

=== Video games ===
Year	Title	Role	Notes	Ref.
2017	Divinity: Original Sin II	Leya, additional voices		
2017	Augmented Empire	Willa		
2022	Elden Ring	Latenna		
2023	Harmony: The Fall of Reverie	Bliss		
2023	Baldur's Gate 3	Shadowheart	Also motion capture	
2024	Wuthering Waves	Carlotta		
2025	Clair Obscur: Expedition 33	Maelle		
2026	Marathon	Joy		
2026	1348 Ex Voto	Bianca		
2026	Valor Mortis	The Shrike		
TBA	Soulframe †	Empress Alora	Although the game has yet to be formally released, English first appeared in its playable pre-alpha in 2025.	
TBA	Emberville †	TBA	Early access release set for October 2026	

=== Web series ===
Year	Title	Role	Notes	Ref.
2026	Age of Umbra: Sallowlands	Dillwyn	Actual play (Daggerheart system)	

== Awards and nominations ==
Year	Award	Category	Nominated work	Result	Ref.
2025	Golden Joystick Awards	Best Lead Performer	Clair Obscur: Expedition 33	Won	
2025	The Game Awards 2025	Best Performance	Clair Obscur: Expedition 33	Won	
2026	New York Game Awards	Great White Way Award for Best Acting in a Game	Clair Obscur: Expedition 33	Won	
2026	29th Annual D.I.C.E. Awards	Outstanding Achievement in Character	Clair Obscur: Expedition 33	Nominated	
2026	24th Game Audio Network Guild Awards	Best Ensemble Cast Performance	Clair Obscur: Expedition 33	Won	
2026	22nd British Academy Games Awards	Performer in a Leading Role	Clair Obscur: Expedition 33	Won	
