= Dark Urge =

The Dark Urge
- The default appearance of the Dark Urge in Baldur's Gate 3
- First appearance: Blood in Baldur's Gate (2023)
- First game: Baldur's Gate 3 (2023)
- Created by: Swen Vincke
- Designed by: Baudelaire Welch
- Voiced by: Neil Roberts (Note: These are the default options for the character.); Amelia Tyler (narration)

In-universe information
- Race: White Dragonborn
- Class: Sorcerer

The Dark Urge is a character from the 2023 role-playing video game Baldur's Gate 3 by Larian Studios, a title set in the Forgotten Realms universe of Dungeons & Dragons. First introduced at the conclusion of tie-in community-based browser game Blood in Baldur's Gate, the character was designated as an "Origin" character that the player can select to play through the game from their perspective. Unlike other "Origin" characters, the Dark Urge's appearance, voice, gender, and class can be customized if the player chooses. By default, the Dark Urge is a male White Dragonborn Sorcerer, voiced by Neil Roberts.

The Dark Urge is an amnesiac compelled by violent urges to harm and kill others due to being a Bhaalspawn, a being born from the blood of the setting's God of Murder, Bhaal. Through the course of the game, it is revealed that they were in fact the mastermind behind the game's plot before being betrayed by another Bhaalspawn, Orin. Upon confronting Orin, the player is given a choice to reject Bhaal or accept the god's blessing, and can choose to either save the world or kill everyone in it.

Praised for how playing as them changed the core concept of the game and added depth to the game's story, the Dark Urge was considered by some to be the game's "true" protagonist due to how much additional content they added to the game. Others praised how the character's mental state juxtaposed against the companions in the title made for an interesting roleplaying experience, while others felt the horror of a character struggling with their inner demons made for a playthrough of Baldur's Gate 3 suitable for the Halloween season.

== Conception and design ==
The Dark Urge was a character concept lead developer Swen Vincke had wanted to put in a game for some time, and was planned at the start of Baldur's Gate 3's development. Early on, the development team had wanted to include a character that would be a "Bhaalspawn", a child of the setting's God of Murder Bhaal, in reference to the protagonist of the previous Baldur's Gate games. Principal writer Jan van Dosselaer went through multiple iterations of the character, with the initial idea being an available companion character for the party that would be struggling against an urge that drove them to "fucking up and doing things". However, lead writer Adam Smith felt that not being able to witness the struggle in the character's mind diminished the impact and chose it as an option for players to instead experience firsthand, making it one of the game's "Origin" options for them to choose and customize.

Added to give players a choice, the developers felt the Dark Urge allowed players to be completely evil if they so chose, though initially with the caveat that by the end of the game they would be alone. Several elements were in part inspired by interactions with another character in the game, Minthara, who players would need to commit heinous acts to gain the trust of and could question why they committed said acts. Vinke acknowledged while very few players played evil characters, he felt the addition was worth it for those that chose to. Originally, the character was intended to be a Paladin, however they found this made things difficult from a narrative standpoint. As a result, they allowed players to customize the character and choose a class themselves, and not make it the default option as it made roleplaying as the character difficult.

Throughout the game's early access period, the character's addition was kept secret, with Vincke only hinting there was a big secret he had in regards to the game during the initial announcement. Smith noted when the character was first revealed, he worked hard to encourage that the character was not intended as "the evil run" for the game. He further argued that the character had the potential to be the most heroic character in the game, through resisting their urges and instead being shrewd, adding "those very urges may be what allows you to seal the deal on a good ending."

=== Writing ===
Early drafts would have had Bhaal attempting to influence the player directly, killing the "dream companion" character the player would encounter in their mental space throughout the title and making demands of them. However Smith felt this gave players too much to contend with atop the game's existing core struggles, stating while it may have worked "as a TV show", it did not in their roleplaying game. After the game's early access release in 2020, Baudelaire "Beau" Welch, who had just been hired, suggested to instead modify the concept and make the character "a deranged leftover". Welch felt that the player was already thrown "a million different names and words and proper nouns" to remember, and the better approach would have been to instead have them feel "There's a fucking voice in my head making me do things I don't want to do." Vincke, upon learning that Welch's mother was a script writer on the film The Silence of the Lambs, asked them to write dialogue for the character.

Welch wrote the character as a "dark counterpoint" to the main storyline, and pose a question as to why players were compelled to do evil acts in a video game. They avoided writing gory scenes directly, instead writing the scenes of the Urge's atrocities in abstract terms to avoid a cool, "heavy metal" tone to them. To help desensitize the player to these actions further another character was added as well, Sceleritas Fel, inspired by the unreliable narrator in the novel A Clockwork Orange. A goblin-like butler to the Urge, Fel would visit the player at night, acting as an element of their past the character couldn't recall but would encourage them to engage in atrocities in a playful manner, with Welch feeling "players aren't going to ever play an evil character unless they're actually having fun with it - unless they feel a real reason to be encouraged to do it".

While Welch initially wanted to write the character as always eventually giving into Bhaal and succumbing to their urges, during development they found players were actively resisting the evil options and instead wanting to redeem the Dark Urge. This surprised Welch, and a scene was added near the game's conclusion where the player could reject Bhaal entirely. While they felt it was "corny", Adam Smith loved the concept, as he felt it shone a different light on the story's struggles of man vs deity, and helped portray the character overcoming "something that is not your fault, that was put into you". Welch themselves came to appreciate the concept, and wanted players to enjoy playing as "the bad guy", but also have room to play as a hero if they chose.

=== Voice ===
While the player can choose which voice set to use for the Dark Urge, Welch chose Neil Roberts to provide the character's default voice. Roberts, whose voice lines were intended to fit Rogue class characters, also provided the opening narration for the Dark Urge. He enjoyed the positive reaction it had received, and acknowledged fan's comparison of the monologue to Shakespeare, stating that he wanted to maintain that character dilemma, and portray the Dark Urge as someone not knowing where they were from but with an overwhelming feel of something they had to fight. He added "it's confusion, and almost like a child not quite knowing what to do. And so we veered into that.”

The game's narrator, voiced by Amelia Tyler, was used to give a voice to the character's bloodlust as well. Tyler considered what the character represented, and portrayed it as "feral, visceral, animalistic, want to tear the world apart with your teeth". She utilized her background in animal studies to characterize its behavior, wanting to portray the character's internal urge to kill akin to an animal pacing in its cage yearning to be let out, a primal need "to kill and not even really knowing why". She didn't want it to feel like someone else's voice, however, but instead a part of the player's character they may not like. She additionally stated that "You so rarely get a character that you can just sink your teeth into like that", and that one of her favorite lines she provided to the game, a dark chuckle after committing a brutal murder, was her favorite line for the character.

== Appearances ==
The character was first introduced by Larian in their official 2023 community-based browser game, Blood in Baldur's Gate. In it, players were tasked with solving murders within the city of Baldur's Gate. The culprit is revealed to be the Dark Urge, who alongside Sceleritas kills the player's character at the end of the game. After its completion, the developers revealed the full character of the Dark Urge, and his role in Baldur's Gate 3.

The Dark Urge was included as one of the "Origin" characters in Baldur's Gate 3 upon its August 3, 2023 release for players to be able to select at the start of the game. Introduced as an amnesiac afflicted with violent compulsions to harm others, during the course of the game the Dark Urge is revealed to be a Bhaalspawn crafted directly from Bhaal himself. With the help of the characters Enver Gortash and Ketheric Thorm, prior to the events of the game the Dark Urge masterminded a plot to take control of a creature called an Elder Brain to use Ilithid tadpoles to take control of the world, with the Urge's ultimate plan being to kill everyone. However, the Dark Urge is betrayed and infected with a tadpole by another Bhaalspawn, Orin, who seeks Bhaal's favor. As the Dark Urge tries to find a way to remove the tadpole, they are encouraged to engage in atrocities by their past life's butler, Sceleritas Fel.

Upon confronting and defeating Orin, the player is given a choice to accept Bhaal's favor and take over the Elder Brain in his name, or reject Bhaal. If the player rejects Bhaal, the god will kill them, but they will be revived and free of Bhaal's influence. If the player accepts Bhaal's favor and they take control of the Elder Brain, the Dark Urge will use it to enact their original plan to kill all life in the world. Alternatively if the player fails to kill Orin, Bhaal will intervene and Dark Urge is instead locked to a fate where they will eventually lose their mind and are driven to kill those they once loved.

== Critical reception ==
The Dark Urge was well received, with Jasmine Gould-Wilson of GamesRadar+ praising the depth that was added to the game's story when playing as the character. She argued that the character's intrinsic links to the game's plot helped the player feel more like the protagonist of the game, and the most "canon": "You're not just another everyman hero with a worm in their brain, but a true stakeholder in the outcome of a long, perilous journey." She additionally described being able to play as a homicidal maniac "who still has a merry band of best buds" made for a unique roleplaying experience. She compared the role of Withers to a chorus member of a Greek tragedy, and alongside the expanded dialogue and involvement with the game's villains provided "an inexplicable weight" to the character's decisions.

Cat Bussell in an article for TechRadar praised how the Dark Urge affected the concept of the game as a whole, undermining the sense of control and player agency usually provided. In particular she cited the bard's death as an example, and how in the aftermath the player is forced to try and reason how to deal with not only the body, but their companions' discovery of the murder. She added that no matter what response the player chose, "it's an upsetting experience, on par with what you might expect from some of the best horror games", and helped establish a sense of dread in the player as to whether they would lose control again. Bussell gave additional praise to how ever-present the presence of the urges were throughout the game, either through dialogue options "that veer from the darkly amusing to the genuinely upsetting", or the presence of Sceleritas Fel. She closed with stating that "knowing that you are only a bad dice roll away from turning into a blood-hungry serial killer offers a distinctive kind of horror", appropriate in particular for the Halloween season.

Polygon's Cass Marshall compared playing as the Dark Urge to the Independent New Vegas option of Fallout: New Vegas or playing as a Malkavian in Vampire: The Masquerade – Bloodlines, due to giving the player freedom and helping enrich the story from a different point of view. While they acknowledged that playing a villain or anti-hero in the game was viable without needing to play as the Dark Urge, "a constant battle against intrusive thoughts", and their ramifications of them if not prepared, added some depth. They further found it "delightful taking the time to peel back the layers and explore Baldur's Gate 3's branching paths", and enjoyed how the community had taken to portray the character in a humorous manner as they dealt with their internal struggle. Madeline Carpou of The Mary Sue meanwhile shared Marshall's Malkavian comparison, illustrating how significantly the game and player perspective of it changed by presenting the player with a character's mental issues and other aspects they might not completely comprehend.
