= Astarion =

Fictional character from Baldur's Gate

- Baldur's Gate character
- Astarion, as he appears in the promotional material for Baldur's Gate 3 (2023)
- First appearance: Baldur's Gate 3 (2023)
- Voiced by: Neil Newbon
- Motion capture: Neil Newbon

In-universe information
- Race: High Elf (Vampire spawn)
- Class: Rogue

Astarion Ancunín is a fictional character from Larian Studios' Baldur's Gate video game series, which is based on the tabletop fantasy role-playing system of Dungeons & Dragons and set in the Forgotten Realms. Making his first appearance in 2023's Baldur's Gate 3, Astarion can serve as the game's primary protagonist or as a recruitable party member. He is a rogue, specializing in stealth, lockpicking, and sneak attacks. In the game, Astarion is kidnapped alongside several other party members and infected with an Illithid parasite and must search for a way to cure himself. Early in the story, he is revealed to be a vampire spawn, and his personal quest focuses on evading and hunting down his former master, Cazador Szarr.

When Astarion was initially encountered during Baldur's Gate 3's early access period, he quickly became a fan-favorite. His prominence on the game's box art and his major role in subsequent trailers and marketing made this evident. He also earned critical praise for his dry, sassy characterization, intriguing backstory, and sex appeal. Astarion is voiced and performed by the English actor Neil Newbon, who has also received praise, winning several awards for his performance, including the 2023 Golden Joystick Award for Best Supporting Performer, and Best Performance at the 2023 Game Awards.

== Creation and development ==
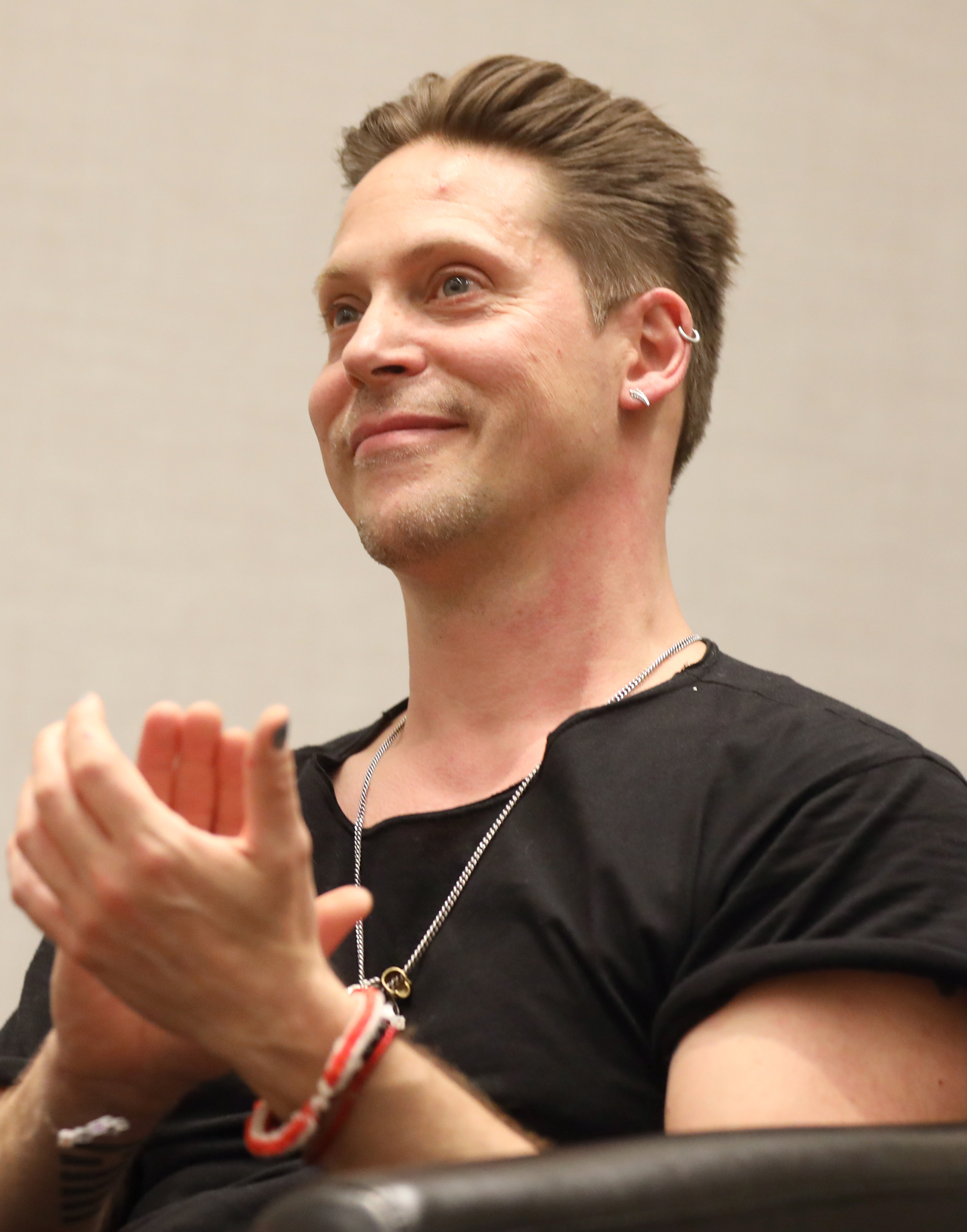
Neil Newbon, who provided the voice and motion capture for Astarion, received critical acclaim and several awards for his performance.

Astarion was created by and primarily written by Baldur's Gate 3 senior writer Stephen Rooney, and is voiced and motion captured by English actor Neil Newbon. Discussing his process for bringing the character to life, Newbon stated that he was heavily influenced by commedia dell’arte, a comedic style of Italian theatre, and their inclusion of an amoral jester known as Arlecchino. Astarion's mannerisms were adapted from several of Newbon's friends and by several creative individuals, namely makeup artist Leendert Van Nimwegen, actor Giles Foreman, and cabaret performer Reuben Kaye. Newbon stated that he developed some of the vampiric aspects of Astarion's character from a local stray cat, explaining that "the way the cat moves, or the way the cat looks at you. The way the cat will allow you to come closer and then rip your hand off when it's bored 'cause that's enough. 'That's enough, now. No touching now, darling.'"

Newbon acknowledged the importance of the character and the exploration of abuse through his questline, stating that "People have come up to me and said that they've felt inspired to deal with their own trauma. As a survivor myself, I understand when they talk to me about it - what they mean. That they feel seen by the game, they feel understood by the characters. That is a testament to this amazing, beautiful masterpiece that Larian, Swen, the writing team have all put together and created." He also mentioned, in reference to being a method actor, that he forced himself to only use memories that were at least seven years old, as is a guideline for that school of acting.

Discussing what it was like to play Astarion, Newbon explained that he was given creative freedom with some heavy themes. He found it very fascinating to play a character who initially appears as a "decadent, manipulative, hedonistic vampire", but is actually deeply traumatised and wears a façade to protect himself from the pain and will do anything to keep his newfound freedom. He also praised the character's pansexuality, and discussed how an intimacy coordinator was available for all of the performers to help them bring the game's sex scenes to life.

Portraying the struggles of Astarion as a survivor of trauma and abuse was a difficult balance for Newbon, who admitted that "there [was] a lot of stuff that came very close to home" and that he had to take care to separate the aspects of his own life that he was bringing to the character to the truth of the actual character in the script, and reflected upon the care he and the developers took with his storyline, explaining "it's not a gimmick. He's not [traumatised] because it's 'just another idea for a character story' … this was a very fleshed out, deep, layered observation of a character in trouble and jeopardy, having gone through trauma—and then what they do to get out of that, and what they can do with their newfound sense of freedom, and what that means to them."

In developing Astarion's personality, Newbon said, "He was probably quite decadent in the past, perhaps abusing his power a little bit. I see him as being very intelligent — very erudite — and highly manipulative when he wants to be. Very vulnerable and traumatized, but also incredibly witty and funny. He's got etiquette, he's articulate, and he's very sophisticated. He's a lover of the arts without, I believe, having the talent to produce art himself. He's also rather good-looking, and he's not afraid to use that as a way to shield himself or to get what he wants. He's immoral, not amoral. I would say he's quite aware of morality. He just chooses not to [be moral], darling, you know?" When asked about how Astarion sees himself, Newbon continued, "I know how I see him. In the script, he does see himself in certain ways, but he's always very, very guarded about it. He's always careful not to give too much away because if he does that, then he starts losing power and can theoretically be manipulated. So, it's a very interesting situation for him to regard himself openly like that."

When asked how Astarion evolved over the course of shooting the game, Neil said, "I used a lot of tools to really explore the character under his circumstances. The needs and wants [were] very clear. To be free is super objective, but that's his ultimate aim, to be free, whatever the cost. That also helped me with the background that [the writers] gave me; he was a magistrate, he's a High Elf, he's of noble class. He's a Baldurian, and he's decadent, he's hedonistic, and he had this amazing life before being turned into a vampire. All of that feeds into the background work and it helps me create habits [for the character]."

Stephen Rooney, writer of Astarion, was asked about where the idea for the character came from and responded, "It very quickly became clear what was at the core of [Astarion's] story. We have a vampire who is a vampire spawn, which we had to do because [he couldn't be] an actual vampire; [they're] very powerful creatures in Dungeons and Dragons. So, we had to make him a vampire spawn, which means he would have to have a master, which means that he would have to be removed from his master. So, you end up in this situation where this character is, in theory, very powerful, and is chasing that power and that freedom, but is also incredibly weak and incredibly vulnerable. Playing off of that dichotomy between a hunger for power and a very real vulnerability." Rooney continued with, "We hit on what was cool and interesting and what was at the emotional core of that character very early on. We knew very early on where [Astarion's] starting point was, and it was fairly clear what his end point was going to be."

When asked about the main characteristics that had to be represented [in Astarion], Rooney said the following: "When you meet Astarion in the game, the first thing he does is pull a knife on you. He has a certain appreciation for violence, I guess. I think it's important to have that, but he's a vampire, he's all about those darker sides of humanity. But at the same time, he's really fun! It was important to me that that is also represented. Those are the two sides [to him], he's gonna stab you, but will he have a smile on his face as he does it? I don't know, that's kind of him in a nutshell."

=== Gameplay ===
As a rogue, Astarion wears light armor and is proficient with several bladed weapons, including daggers, rapiers and longswords, as well as longbows and crossbows. Astarion is skilled in acrobatics, deception, perception, performance, persuasion, sleight of hand, and stealth, making him well-suited to several tasks, including picking locks and disarming traps, which are invaluable early on in the game if the player has not also created a rogue character. As a High Elf, he naturally has the ability to cast a Fire Bolt but does not have any other magical abilities, unless the player selects specific character options. As a vampire spawn, Astarion has a unique Vampire Bite ability which drains an enemy of some of their health and transfers it to Astarion, though this ability is not unlocked until the player finds out that Astarion is a vampire during the story. Depending on the outcome of his personal quest, he may gain an upgraded version of this ability, known as Ascendant Bite, and the power to transform into a cloud of mist.

== Appearances ==
=== Baldur's Gate 3 ===
Astarion is a High Elf rogue who is also a vampire spawn first introduced in Baldur's Gate 3. He was kidnapped by illithids and infected with a parasite. Players can choose to play Astarion as an origin character or he can be recruited in the party as a companion. As an adventuring companion, Astarion will often offer commentary on events. As part of the game's companion approval system, Astarion will generally approve of displays of power or mockery. Additionally, he approves choices that support autonomy, and helping certain characters. Astarion will disapprove of displays of weakness and certain acts of kindness that offer no reward. He also resents players who attempt to control or restrict him in some way.

Players can learn more about Astarion and influence his development through his companion quest, "The Pale Elf". This quest reveals Astarion is a vampire spawn. The player makes a deal with Astarion over whether he is allowed to feed on their enemies or must stick to non-intelligent creatures. Throughout the game, Astarion can reveal more about past, such as information about his master, Cazador Szarr, who tormented him and his six vampire siblings for two hundred years. He expresses joy that his capture has freed him from Cazador, and that the parasite has eliminated his weakness to sunlight. If the player enters into a romance with Astarion or has high approval with him, they will learn about the strange scars that Cazador had carved into his back, though he does not know what they mean. During the adventure, it is possible for Astarion to make a deal with the devil Raphael to decipher the meaning of his scars, where he reveals they are part of a seven part contract with the archdevil Mephistopheles.

During the game's third act, the party can come across two of Cazador's spawn, who reveal preparations for a ritual known as the Black Mass are underway. Several of Astarion's fellow spawn can attempt to kidnap him; if successful, he will be tortured at Cazador's mansion until rescued. If not captured, Astarion and the rest of the party can infiltrate the mansion themselves, and find that the Black Mass has already begun. Upon gaining entry to Cazador's study, Astarion is shocked to discover an entire underground dungeon that holds thousands of imprisoned vampire spawn. Astarion is horrified, believing that the people he and his siblings had been sent to hunt were long dead. The party eventually confronts Cazador, who reveals that the scars on the backs of his seven original spawn will be used to sacrifice them and the other prisoners, allowing him to gain enough power to ascend.

Once Cazador is defeated, the player is then tasked with influencing how Astarion's story ends. If they support Astarion completing the Black Mass ritual himself, Cazador, his vampire siblings, and the seven thousand prisoners will be sacrificed and Astarion will become a vampire ascendant. Astarion's personality will significantly change if he ascends, becoming more arrogant and controlling. Astarion will request that a player he is in a relationship with became his spawn and he will break up with them if they refuse. If he does not complete the ritual, Astarion kills Cazador. The player then may choose to advise Astarion over whether to release the prisoners, kill them, or leave them in the cells. Following the completion of his quest, an Astarion who did not ascend will take romanced players to visit his grave, and will confess his love.

Following the game's final battle, if Astarion is a vampire spawn, he will become vulnerable to sunlight again. If the player is in a relationship with Astarion, they can pledge to help him find a permanent cure. His behaviour during the epilogue is dependent on the choice made during his companion quest: if the ritual was completed, although Astarion will continue to retain his arrogant persona, he will be proud to have the player side by side with him. If Astarion remained a spawn, he continues to act sarcastically and flamboyantly, bragging about his time as an adventurer and exhibiting a renewed sense of self that is accepting of his own identity and nature.

=== Novels and comic books ===
In April 2026, Penguin Random House announced the prequel novel Baldur's Gate 3: Astarion by T. Kingfisher. It released on September 29, 2026; Baldur's Gate 3 senior writer Stephen Rooney was a consultant on the novel. The audiobook edition was narrated by Astarion's voice actor Neil Newbon. The prequel is a tragedy; it splits time between Astarion's childhood and an adventure after he became one of Cazador's spawn. Kingfisher explained that Astarion "to a certain extent" has some personal growth in the prequel novel, however, the character could not change much as Astarion's "big arc in the game is reclaiming his agency". She commented that "I think that one of the things about tragedies is that the ending is inevitable and you can see it coming. You know he's not going to find true love and it's going to go to hell". Lin Codega of Rascal wrote that "Kingfisher couldn't give him what he wanted, she couldn't fix him, and she could only encourage a bit of character growth. She thinks of the book as missing its third act – which is, of course, where Baldur's Gate 3 steps in to finish the character growth that this book begins to explore".

In October 2026, Dark Horse Comics announced that the first arc of the upcoming ongoing comic series Baldur's Gate III will focus on Astarion. This six-issue arc will be written by Alyssa Wong, with art by Vincenzo Carratù.

=== Other games ===
Astarion was added as a champion to the incremental game Idle Champions of the Forgotten Realms in September 2023.

Outside of video games, the character was included on cards for Magic: the Gathering's "Commander Legends: The Battle For Baldur's Gate" set, appearing on both a regular and a special "showcase" card. Astarion's Book of Hungers (2025), a digital sourcebook for the 5th edition of Dungeons & Dragons, included marginalia by the titular character. It also included lore about Astarion from before the events of Baldur's Gate 3.

== Critical reception ==
When Baldur's Gate 3 was released, Astarion instantly became a fan-favorite character, with NBC News and CNN reporting that videos featuring him had received over half a billion views on TikTok, with fans citing his heartthrob features, sassy quips and enjoyable romance arc as some of their primary reasons for their enjoyment of the character. Additionally, other players stated that they identified with his story as a survivor of trauma and abuse, and considered him a comfort character for those with similar experiences. Discussing reaction to the character, Neil Newbon, Astarion's voice actor, noted "it is incredibly touching to have people come up to me and say, 'Astarion's story made me feel seen,' and that I was not prepared for — that was something, which was amazing and wild and beautiful." In Publishers Weekly's "Best-selling Books Week of October 12, 2026", Baldur's Gate 3: Astarion was #6 in "Hardcover Fiction" with 15,870 units sold. In The New York Times Best Seller list for October 18, 2026, the book was #7 in "Hardcover Fiction".

Astarion is highly regarded among the other party members in Baldur's Gate 3, ranking highly on numerous best character lists. Jessica Fillby of Dexerto placed him in S-tier alongside Karlach and Shadowheart, stating: "it's hard to resist Astarion in Baldur's Gate 3, whether that’s the vampiric charm or the pure charisma he holds. Either way, Astarion is funny, extremely flirtatious, and the right amount of trouble to get any D&D player interested." Writing for Den of Geek, Matthew Byrd ranked Astarion as the game's fourth best companion, explaining that "Astarion's story is not only compelling, but it's one of the few companion stories that are interesting right out of the gate rather than after you've invested considerable time into getting to know a character. Astarion's story is never quite what you think it's going to be, and I mean that in the best way possible." Katelyn Mitchell Jewett of Game Rant declared Astarion one of the game's best companions, citing his complex and compelling story, his usefulness as a party member, his romance plotline, and his unique take on the central conflict.” Writing for the same publication, Carrie Talbot praised the characterization of Astarion, and the writing and performance of Rooney and Newbon, for revolutionizing the morality system in roleplaying games. In 2024, a poll conducted by BAFTA with around 4,000 respondents named Astarion as the seventeenth most iconic video-game character of all time.
