= Baldur's Gate 3 =

2023 video game

- Developer: Larian Studios
- Publisher: Larian Studios
- Director: Swen Vincke
- Producer: David Walgrave
- Artist: Joachim Vleminckx
- Writers: Adam Smith; Chrystal Ding; Sarah Baylus
- Composer: Borislav Slavov
- Series: Baldur's Gate
- Engine: Divinity Engine
- Platforms: Windows; PlayStation 5; macOS; Xbox Series X/S; Linux (Note: The Linux build is optimized specifically for the Steam Deck, and is not officially supported on other Linux-based platforms.)
- Release: Windows; 3 August 2023; PlayStation 5; 6 September 2023; macOS; 22 September 2023; Xbox Series X/S; 7 December 2023; Linux; 23 September 2025
- Genre: Role-playing
- Modes: Single-player, multiplayer

Baldur's Gate 3 (also known as BG3 and Baldur's Gate III) is a role-playing video game by Larian Studios. It is the third installment in the Baldur's Gate series. The game's full release for Windows happened on August 3, 2023, with PlayStation 5, macOS, and Xbox Series X/S later in the same year. In the game's narrative, the party seeks to cure themselves of the Illithid parasites infecting their brains. It can be played alone or in a group.

Adapted from the fifth edition of tabletop role-playing game Dungeons & Dragons, Baldur's Gate 3 takes its mechanics and setting, the Forgotten Realms, from the tabletop game. Players create a customizable character and embark on quests with a party of voiced companions. Alternatively, they can play as a companion instead. The gameplay comprises real-time exploration of large areas, turn-based combat, and narrative choices which impact the party and the wider world. Outcomes for combat, dialogue and world interaction are generally determined by rolling a 20-sided die.

Baldur's Gate (1998) and Baldur's Gate II: Shadows of Amn (2000) were developed by BioWare. A third game, subtitled The Black Hound and developed by Black Isle Studios, was cancelled in 2003 following a licensing dispute. Dungeons and Dragons owner Wizards of the Coast declined Larian's first pitch to make the game following the release of Divinity: Original Sin (2014). Impressed by prerelease material for Divinity: Original Sin II (2017), Wizards welcomed a new pitch and eventually greenlit Larian's development. The company grew considerably in the six-year production. In August 2020, Larian released the game's first act in early access, providing them with player feedback and revenue. After the full release, Larian added free new content to the game until the final patch in April 2025.

Baldur's Gate 3 received critical acclaim and had record-breaking awards success, with praise directed at its cinematic visuals, writing, production quality, and performances. It became the first title to win Game of the Year at all five major video game awards ceremonies and received the same accolade from several publications. It was both a financial and critical success, generating significant profits for Larian Studios and for Wizards' parent company, Hasbro, and is widely regarded as one of the greatest video games ever made.

== Gameplay ==
A screenshot of a combat scenario, showing the top-down isometric view

Baldur's Gate 3 is a role-playing game, and can be played in single-player or multiplayer. (Note: Multiplayer is available both online and split screen forms. There is a four-player limit. In multiplayer, players generally act independently, but the session's host makes dialogue selections for main story choices. One player can be engaged in dialogue while another explores elsewhere, or they can spectate the dialogue and suggest response options. By default, romance scenes with non-player characters are hidden from other player characters.) It has a free-floating camera, with players able to adjust the perspective from top-down isometric to third person. Based on the fifth edition rules of the tabletop game Dungeons & Dragons (D&D 5e), several mechanics are identical between the two. (Note: Larian were required to make some adjustments to the DnD 5e rules owing to the change in medium. Vincke described Larian Studios as the "dungeon master" with "some house rules". Some differences include changes to healing, spells, and changing some actions, like drinking a potion, into bonus actions.) A major feature is that outcomes are decided by rolling a twenty-sided die (d20). (Note: By default, the game activates a setting called "karmic dice". This manipulates rolls to ensure rolls are not subject to long streaks of bad or good luck.) Some rolls occur with "advantage" or "disadvantage", meaning two d20s are rolled and the player receives the best or worst result, respectively. The game includes support for modding, but using them disables achievements.

In character creation, the player selects a class, (Note: Class is one of the most important decisions in Baldur's Gate 3—it is the primary determinant of a character's play style. There are twelve options for character class: Bard, Barbarian, Cleric, Druid, Fighter, Monk, Paladin, Ranger, Rogue, Sorcerer, Warlock, or Wizard. Each class has multiple subclasses, offering further play-style specialisation. For example: the Wild Magic subclass for the Barbarian provides a typically melee-focused character with spellcasting abilities. Subclasses are not available at the start of the game but are gained at level 2 or 3 (of the maximum 12), except for Cleric, Paladin, Sorcerer, and Warlock.) species, (Note: There are eleven available species: Dragonborn, Drow, Dwarf, Elf, Githyanki, Gnome, Half-Elf, Half-Orc, Halfling, Human, or Tiefling.) and backstory. (Note: There are 11 available backgrounds—Acolyte, Charlatan, Criminal, Entertainer, Folk Hero, Guild Artisan, Noble, Outlander, Sage, Soldier, or Urchin. These grant additional skills and dialogue options. The Dark Urge has a unique Haunted One background.) If the selected class uses magic, they will also choose their starting spells. Characters level up by collecting experience points by several means—examples include exploration, combat, and solving puzzles. Levelling up provides access to new class features. The maximum player level of Baldur's Gate 3 is level 12; in the tabletop game, the limit is level 20. Available at certain level intervals are feats. These diversify or specialise a character's style of play. With each feat, players choose a new ability or increase their stats, which are called abilities. (Note: Abilities govern a character's effectiveness with a range of tasks. They include strength, dexterity, constitution, intelligence, wisdom, and charisma.) After levelling up, players can also choose to place a level into a different class, known as multiclassing. (Note: Multi-classed characters level each class separately. For example: a level-2 sorcerer-rogue would be a level-1 sorcerer and a level-1 rogue.)

=== Quests and exploration ===
The game is divided into three acts, with a large, explorable location tied to each. In non-combat scenarios, the game is primarily experienced in real time. (Note: While Baldur's Gate 3 cannot be paused, players can activate turn-based mode at any time.) There are 288 quests, with significant creative freedom as to how they are completed, some being mutually exclusive, and some unfolding across multiple arcs. Companions have their own side quests, but the game can be completed without companion presence. Almost any character can die, including those integral to the narrative, and all speaking characters are fully voiced. Using a spell or potion, players can speak to any encountered animal, and a more limited number of corpses.

Players can set up a camp as a way to rest from the adventure and talk with companions. There are 17 unique camp locations, contextually dependent on where in the game world the camp is set up. A non-player character based at camp, Withers, allows players to respec. Limited resources—for example, hit points and spell slots—are replenished by resting. There are two types of rest: long and short. A short rest restores 50% of the characters' maximum hit points alongside some class-specific features. Players can short rest twice before they must long rest to replenish them. Long rests teleport players back to camp and fully replenish resources.

Players select items in the world, such as chests, to interact with them. Items, like explosive barrels, can be sent to a camp stash and retrieved later. Picking locks, disarming traps, and exploring locations grant experience. If the player attempts to pick a lock, the game rolls dice and the result is compared against the value required to open the lock. A character's skills or abilities can add to the rolled value, improving likelihood of success.

=== Combat ===
The game's combat systems are modelled on D&D 5e. Entering combat switches the game to turn-based mode. A d4 roll, called an initiative roll, determines the order in which each character acts. (Note: Turn order in combat is also impacted by a character's abilities.) In a turn, each character has limited resources. The primary resources are actions, bonus actions, and movement. Major instructions to a character, like attacking with a sword or casting a spell, consume an action. Smaller commands, like jumping or drinking a potion, (Note: Drinking a potion during a bonus action was a custom rule by Larian that was later implemented into the tabletop game.) consume a bonus action. Characters can also move a set distance. When the player has finished the available actions for a character, their turn ends; combat is finished when all enemies are defeated. The player can also have controlled characters leave combat by moving sufficiently far from enemies. The outcomes of player actions—for example, whether an attack hits and how much damage it deals—are primarily determined through dice rolls.

When a character attacks, the game rolls a d20—this is called an attack roll. The result is compared against the target's armour class; if the roll value is lower than the armour class, the attack misses. Players can see the percentage-chance that an attack will hit before making it; this value is impacted by things like terrain. Some attacks have damage types. These can amplify one another (e.g., applying grease and fire to a target will make them burn for multiple turns) or counteract the other's effect (e.g., shooting a fire arrow at an enemy standing in ice will melt the ice, leaving a water surface). Environmental elements like explosive barrels can be exploited, and weapons can be dipped in poison.

=== Social ===
Conversations are another area of gameplay in Baldur's Gate 3. Some conversations include skill checks, wherein the player rolls a d20, with the result affecting the outcome. Players can initiate combat by selecting an aggressive dialogue option, or use dialogue to avoid combat entirely. This is a major feature of the charisma-focused bard class. Dialogue options can involve persuasion, intimidation, and deception.

Player characters can initiate romance or sexual relationships with many non-player characters. Actions and dialogue options affect relationship outcomes. Characters that can be romanced are "playersexual", meaning the player character's gender does not impact romance availability. The game has thirteen romance options.

== Narrative ==
=== Setting ===
Baldur's Gate 3 shares its Dungeons and Dragons setting, called the Forgotten Realms, with previous games in the franchise. BG3 and its predecessors take place on the continent of Faerûn, primarily near or inside the namesake city of Baldur's Gate. BG3 occurs over 100 years after the events of Baldur's Gate II: Shadows of Amn (2000) and shortly after the events of the D&D tie-in adventure, Baldur's Gate: Descent into Avernus (2019). The game features monsters from the Forgotten Realms, including owlbears, gnolls, and mind flayers.

The game's first act has no designated tutorial, but certain resources and encounters throughout the act are deliberately constructed to guide the player. The act is primarily set around a mind flayer ship wreckage. Players have access to several locations, including a druids' grove, goblin camp, and a monastery set against a mountain pass. Writer Ali Jones characterises the first act as "fairytale backdrop", and IGN's Leana Hafer said it was "mostly idyllic wilderness". Eight of the game's ten companions are introduced in act one, with six recruitable near the start. The Underdark is a large subterranean area accessible through multiple locations; each entrance leads to unique environments. Act one ends when players traverse the mountain pass or Underdark to reach act two's setting. In act two, players traverse the Shadow Cursed lands to reach Moonrise Towers, an oppressive and dark environment. Only one companion is introduced in act two. Locations explored include the Last Light Inn and the Gauntlet of Shar. The third and final act is primarily set in the dense city environment of Baldur's Gate, but with some areas accessible outside of the city, like a visiting circus and the shoreline. The city is the location of the tenth and final recruitable companion.

=== Characters ===
The world, alongside the player's thoughts and observations, are recounted by the game's narrator (Amelia Tyler), acting as BG3's dungeon master. While the narrator was originally planned to deliver lines contemptuously, Larian was impressed by Tyler's deadpan delivery. Of the ten companions, six can be chosen as the player character in the character creator. Known as origin characters, they have a pre-set character class, race, and appearance. Although their classes can be changed, origin character personalities and backstories are sometimes related to them.

- Astarion is a hedonistic high elf vampire spawn rogue voiced by Neil Newbon and written by Stephen Rooney.
- Gale (Tim Downie) is a human wizard from the city of Waterdeep, and the most popular choice for origin character playthroughs.
- Shadowheart is a half-human, half-high elf cleric of Shar, the goddess of loss, portrayed by Jennifer English and written by John Corcoran.
- Lae'zel, portrayed by Devora Wilde, is a fanatical githyanki with a default base class of fighter. She is quick to anger, disobliging, and the first companion encountered in Baldur's Gate 3.
- Wyll, voiced by Theo Solomon, is a human warlock folk hero who gained his powers through a pact with a fiend.
- Karlach is a tiefling and former soldier of Avernus who is a barbarian by default. She was portrayed by Samantha Béart and written by Sarah Baylus. Karlach was heavily iterated across development. According to Béart, she was changed due to similarities to Lae'zel.

The seventh origin character, the Dark Urge, cannot be recruited. (Note: If not selected by the player, the Dark Urge can be found, dead, during the game world.)

There are four non-origin characters who can be recruited:

- Minthara (Emma Gregory) is a dark elf Paladin, initially encountered as an enemy, whose recruitment at launch required an evil playthrough, but Larian made recruiting her easier following release.
- Halsin (Dave Jones) is a wood elf druid and the master of the druids' grove that the player visits during the game's first act. Initially not recruitable during early access, player reception to Halsin was so positive that he was given a companion role.
- Jaheira (Tracy Wiles) is a half-elf druid and leader of the Harpers, an organization dedicated to the preservation of historical lore and knowledge.
- Minsc (Matthew Mercer) is a human ranger who carries a hamster named Boo with him; Jaheira and Minsc previously appeared in both Baldur's Gate and Baldur's Gate II: Shadows of Amn.

=== Plot ===
The protagonist wakes up inside a giant dimension-crossing illithid (mind flayer) flying ship. They are infected with a parasitic tadpole that enthralls and transforms people into illithids; however, the transformation does not happen, and the ship comes under attack from githyanki warriors riding red dragons. The mind flayer crew teleports the ship to the Nine Hells and are attacked by an army of Devils. The protagonist is freed during the fighting and steers the damaged ship to Faerûn, where it crashes. They encounter other survivors of the wreck, all likewise implanted with tadpoles.

The party seeks to remove their parasites through numerous avenues, all of which fail to provide a cure. They are saved from the tadpoles' overwhelming psychic force by a "Dream Guardian" inside Shadowheart's mysterious prism, a device that is sought after by the githyanki. The protagonist then becomes involved in the fate of the Emerald Grove, where local druids and tiefling refugees face off against the goblin horde that worships a cult of the "Absolute". Once the party either sacks or saves the grove, they travel through the mountains or the Underdark to reach Moonrise Towers, a cultist stronghold, in search of a new cure.

The protagonist seeks sanctuary from the curse around Moonrise Towers in a tavern called the Last Light, held by a group of tiefling refugees, Flaming Fist conscripts, and Harpers. General Ketheric Thorm, the reigning lord of Moonrise and Chosen of Myrkul, is using a relic named the "Nightsong" as an engine for his immortality. The party scours the Gauntlet of Shar, a deserted temple to the goddess of darkness and loss, in pursuit of the Nightsong, revealed to be Dame Aylin, a daughter of Selûne, the goddess of the moon and Shar's sister. After either slaying or freeing the Nightsong, the protagonist confronts Ketheric, as well as his cohorts—Orin the Red (the Chosen of Bhaal) and Enver Gortash (the Chosen of Bane). Through their Netherstones and a mysterious crown, the triumvirate collectively controls the Absolute (revealed to be an Elder Brain, the ultimate form of the illithid race) and seeks to rule the Sword Coast by manipulating everyone infected with a tadpole. Orin and Gortash depart with the Elder Brain for Baldur's Gate, while the protagonist defeats Ketheric and claims his Netherstone.

The protagonist arrives at Baldur's Gate as Gortash and Orin attempt to pit them against the other, while the companions find closure for their personal quests. It is revealed that the "Dream Guardian" is, in fact, a visage taken by a renegade illithid called the Emperor, who resides within the prism and oversees the imprisonment of a powerful githyanki, Orpheus. Orpheus is the source of psionic resistance the party possesses against the Absolute, and the Emperor has been leveraging this in his favour. The protagonist eventually faces off against Gortash and Orin, assembling the Netherstones to subdue the Elder Brain. The Elder Brain, having anticipated the triumvirate and the protagonist's every move, overpowers the party before the Emperor comes to the rescue.

Realizing that the Netherstones require an illithid wielder with Orpheus' powers to be effective, the protagonist can either allow the Emperor to consume Orpheus or else the player character, Karlach or Orpheus must transform into an illithid. If working with the Emperor, he or the illithid in the party consumes Orpheus; otherwise, the Emperor leaves to side with the Elder Brain to save himself while the party frees and allies with Orpheus. After defeating the Elder Brain, the protagonist can choose to either betray their comrades and rule as the Absolute, let the Emperor rule and serve at his side, or kill the Elder Brain and every illithid tadpole with it, ending the threat forever.

== Development ==
=== Background ===
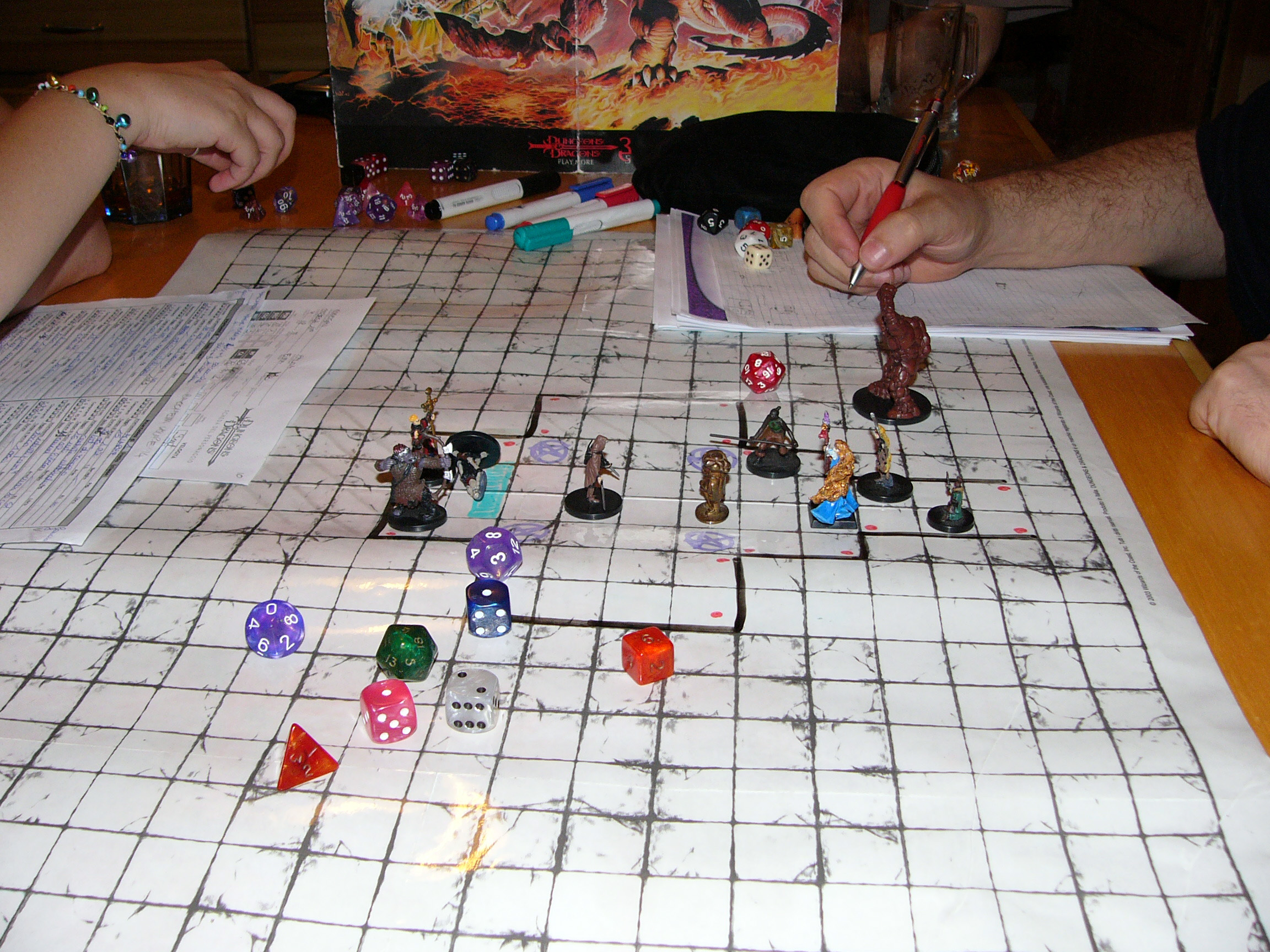
The tabletop game, Dungeons and Dragons, showing its grid-based map

The Baldur's Gate series began development in 1995 when Wizards of the Coast's predecessor, TSR, Inc., asked publisher Interplay Entertainment to produce a video game using the Dungeons & Dragons (D&D) property. BioWare agreed to develop the title, having formed a partnership with Interplay for Shattered Steel (1996). Initially titled Iron Throne, the game was retitled Baldur's Gate (1998) at the suggestion of Interplay co-founder Brian Fargo. Created by a largely inexperienced group of developers, BioWare delivered the game a year behind Interplay's schedule and achieved commercial success, leading to an expansion in 1999. (Note: BioWare's Infinity Engine was used by Black Isle Studios for their Dungeons and Dragons role-playing video games, Planescape: Torment (1999) and Icewind Dale (2000). BioWare and Black Isle were frequently confused by fans in the 1990s.) A direct sequel followed, Baldur's Gate II: Shadows of Amn (2000), using the second edition of D&D for its rule set, and was also published by Interplay and Black Isle Studios. The first two Baldur's Gate games provided pre-scripted, branching narratives. BioWare's third game with the D&D property, Neverwinter Nights (2002), used D&D's third edition, and facilitated a gameplay experience closer to the tabletop game by emphasising multiplayer and allowing players to control non-player characters. (Note: While BioWare did not make another Baldur's Gate game, several key creative figures led development on BioWare's spiritual successor, Dragon Age: Origins.) Following a licensing issue, another Dungeons and Dragons video game, The Black Hound, was designated as the third game in the Baldur's Gate series; it was cancelled when Interplay lost the rights to release Baldur's Gate titles on PC.

Several companies sought the rights to make the title over the following decade. Interplay's Brian Fargo described interest from Obsidian Entertainment's CEO Feargus Urquhart, Larian Studios' CEO Swen Vincke, and Fargo himself. Canadian developer Beamdog made enhanced editions of the first and second games, followed by Baldur's Gate: Siege of Dragonspear (2016), a large expansion using the Infinity Engine. Cameron Tofer, co-founder of Beamdog, said making the third game was the studio's "long-term goal".

Vincke first approached Wizards of the Coast about making the game during Larian's development of Divinity: Original Sin (2014), but Wizards declined, citing their inexperience. (Note: By the completion of the sequel, Divinity: Original Sin II, PC Gamer's Fraser Brown notes that the studio had "20 years of D&D-adjacent RPG" experience.) Shortly before the release of the sequel, Divinity: Original Sin II (2017), Wizards were intrigued by prerelease footage and asked Larian for a pitch for Baldur's Gate 3. Vincke created a design document around a month before the release of Original Sin II in a hotel room with several designers and writers. The pitch was scheduled for the release day of Original Sin II, leading to a short turnaround time. Wizards did not like the pitch, but granted Larian's request for more time. Wizards had a new chief executive officer at this time and Vincke met him on one of his first days. Larian had to meet several milestones, including an approved design document. A later pitch was received positively and Wizards granted Larian the licence. In an October 2019 Twitter post, Fargo said he knew who was developing Baldur's Gate 3.

=== Studio growth and challenges ===
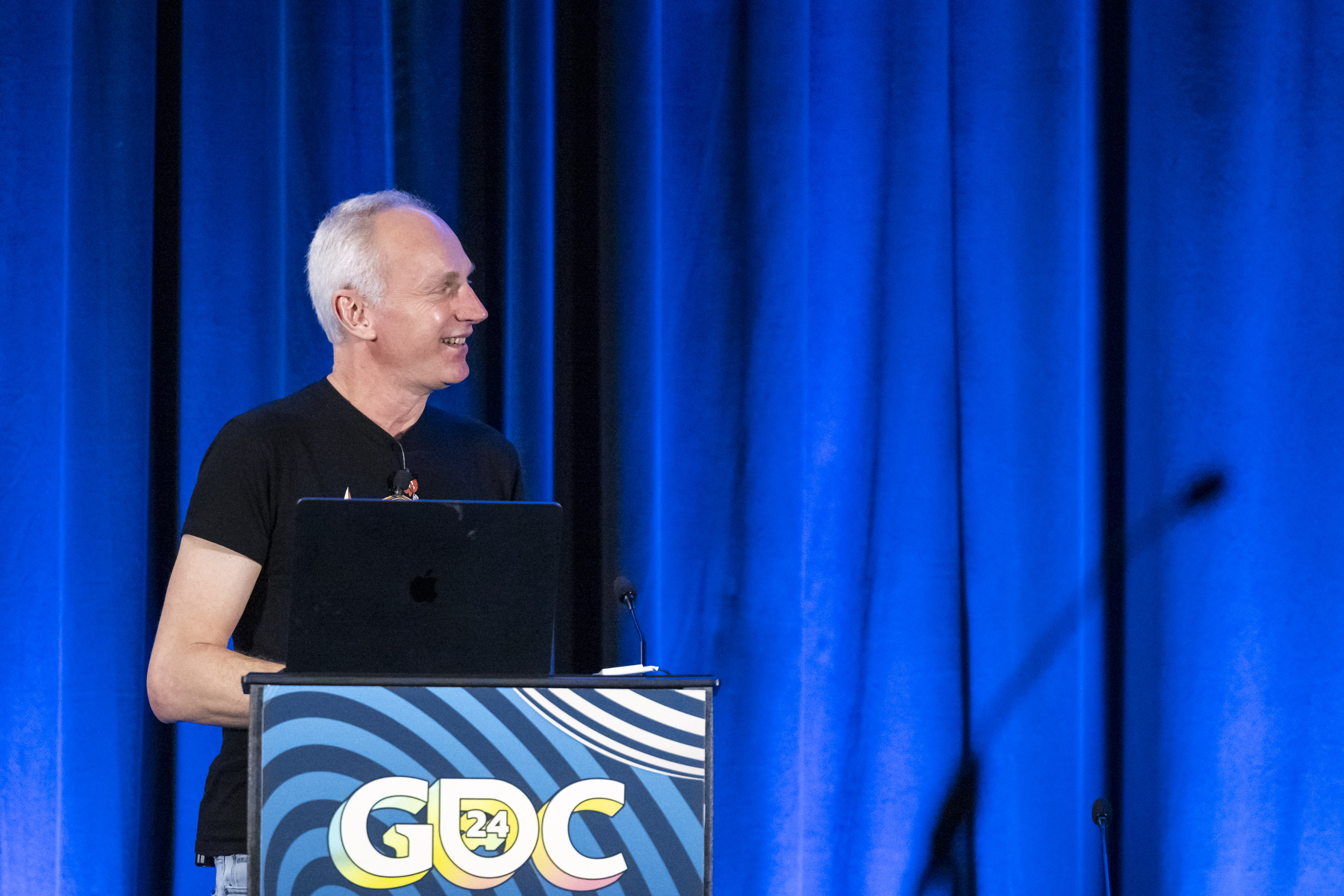
Game director Swen Vincke at the 2024 Game Developer's Conference

Larian wanted to produce a game with triple-A production values, budget, and marketing; they viewed Baldur's Gate, alongside Fallout and Ultima, as an intellectual property capable of enabling that. Larian built new cinematic functionality into their game engine, viewing these capabilities as key to accessibility. The studio's cinematic ambitions came with challenges, requiring the studio grow considerably. Close-up dialogue scenes required new teams responsible for cinematics quality assurance and lighting. The size of the art and audio teams increased because the technical requirements differed from those of Original Sin II. Clothing designs and textures, for example, had to work from close and far perspectives because of the cinematic camera. Baldur's Gate 3 uses technology from the eighth generation of video game consoles, like screen-spaced reflections and shadow maps for lighting and shadow.

The studio's size increased from around 140 employees in 2017 to over 450 in 2023, making it one of the world's largest privately owned video game companies. Industry journalist Jason Schreier described Larian Studios as a "unicorn": large enough to make triple-A games but not subject to the mechanics mandated by publicly traded publishers, like microtransactions and battle passes, that "maximize revenue" and "minimize risk".

In part due to the COVID-19 pandemic and the Russian invasion of Ukraine, Baldur's Gate 3 had an unusually long 6-year development cycle. Larian closed its Saint Petersburg office following the invasion. Anticipating military enlistment for staff, they liaised with embassies and consulates to support relocation efforts, with 90% of employees based in Saint Petersburg moving office. The game's complex code base meant the effects of closing the office were felt throughout development. Vincke described Baldur's Gate 3 as Larian's "Covid game", with the pandemic reducing productivity, causing communication issues internally and with external partners, and preventing performance motion capture. The studio lost staff over the 6-year development period, including cinematics lead Jim Southworth, who died shortly after the game's release. The credits bear a dedication to Southworth.

=== Writing and motion capture ===
Dungeons and Dragons creative director Mike Mearls said the team welcomed Larian changes to D&D lore, hoping changes would tie into increased player agency. Mearls said that collaborating with Larian felt like a natural extension of Wizards of the Coast's D&D team, with both companies anticipating required adjustments to fifth-edition rules. Vincke suggested using mind flayers as antagonists after seeing an illustration in Volo's Guide to Monsters. Writer Adam Smith said Wizards had not documented the process of transforming into one, so Larian produced a 7-day timeline, inspired by body horror and the films of David Cronenberg. Baldur's Gate 3 is set over 100 years after the first two entries; Smith said Wizards had "filled out" the intervening century because the area was integral to the Forgotten Realms and Sword Coast settings. Larian collaborated with Wizards on a precursor module for the game, Baldur's Gate: Descent into Avernus (2019). The module provided information on events occurring since Baldur's Gate II.

Larian had two London-based studios working on motion capture. Vincke estimated this spanned 1.5 million words of dialogue in 2020; in 2024, Vincke estimated 1.3 million lines and over 140 hours of cutscenes. (Note: These cutscene hours cannot be experienced in a single playthrough: "For every decision you make, and every short cinematic conversation you see linked to it, dozens more are recorded for the same moment that you won't see.") In development, the multiplayer mode allowed players to role play with their partner, but the feature was removed because of the added complexity. All 248 of the game's voice actors performed the motion capture for their characters. There are over 170 ending variations, (Note: In August 2024, Larian revealed that one variation had only been experienced by just over thirty players.) which required substantial testing, and Larian's writers worked on ending dialogue and descriptions for over a year. Larian encouraged the main cast to interact with fans, which Devora Wilde, who portrays Lae'zel, said was unusual in the industry.

Smith described the team's approach as "reactive", saying that identifying frequent player choices informed their writing decisions. Some characters were changed substantially throughout development. Larian reduced the hostility of companions to the player character, including Shadowheart and Lae'zel. Karlach's infernal heart was a late addition to the game. According to region producer Elena Statsenko, Larian aimed to incorporate moral dilemmas and outcome variety for different player types into quests. Other design considerations included integration with the main story and adjustments if the player controlled an origin character.

== Release ==
=== Early access ===
Larian Studios revealed Baldur's Gate 3 with a trailer at a conference for Google's cloud gaming platform, Stadia, in July 2019. Vincke said letting potential customers play without installing the game had "great conversion power", but stated the title would not be exclusive to Stadia. Following Google's discontinuation of Stadia in 2023, Vincke expressed regret, describing it as "a really stupid deal", but said the funds provided by the deal had funded the game's visuals.

Larian partially released an unfinished version of the game's first act into early access in October 2020. The early access had over 2.5 million players with the resulting revenue sustaining the studio. The game's scope increased throughout this period. Some companions were not recruitable in the early access, and it contained many bugs. Other changes included new character classes and subclasses, user interface updates and game balancing. Eurogamer's Ruth Cassidy said that the changes to characterisation before the full release, such as decreasing hostility to the player and increasing their vulnerability, felt like fan service. Continuous rewriting of the script required voice actors to return to the studio.

During early access the game's Steam user reviews dropped below 75%, which Vincke characterised as a "disaster". IGN, PC Gamer and GameSpot's reviewers said it was fun but that bugs meant waiting for the full release would be advantageous, with David Wildgoose describing the game as "rough", "messy", and "just barely hanging together". Ars Technica and Siliconera's reviews said the early access provided an overall disappointing experience.

=== Full release ===
Larian experienced issues while developing a version for Xbox Series X and Series S. Performance variation between the two consoles in split-screen co-operative play was an issue because feature parity was a requirement of the Xbox platform. Following an in-person meeting with Microsoft Games executive Phil Spencer at Gamescom, Vincke and Spencer arranged a compromise where the game could be brought to Xbox consoles without split-screen play on the Xbox Series S.

In March 2023, Larian Studios staff were concerned that the game would be delayed to avoid competition from another title, Bethesda Softworks' Starfield, after the lengthy development cycle. Vincke accelerated the game's Windows release by four weeks, and delayed the PlayStation 5 version by one week. The game was released for Windows on 3 August 2023, PlayStation 5 on 6 September 2023, and macOS on 22 September 2023. Following the PlayStation 5 version's launch, Larian revealed an animated short, "The Launch Party", co-produced with UK-based animation studio Mashed. On 7 December 2023, directly following The Game Awards 2023, Larian released Baldur's Gate 3 on Xbox Series X and Series S.

=== Post-release ===
After release, Larian Studios provided new content and improvements via patching, with release dates sometimes varying by platform. Released for PC in August 2023, the first patch added over 1,000 bug fixes and balance changes, alongside increased polish for animations. The September 2023 update permitted players to customise their appearance, support for modding, and increased the number of endings for evil playthroughs. A November 2023 patch added customisation for player characters and hirelings; increased the frequency of autosaving; and new idle animations. In December 2023, the developer added a permadeath and custom difficulty mode and an expanded epilogue featuring over 3,500 new lines of dialogue. An eighth and final patch was released in April 2025. The patch introduced 12 new sub-classes, a photo mode, cross-platform play, and co-operative split-screen for Xbox Series S. Jasmine Gould-Wilson regretted that GamesRadar+ could not name BG3 as their 2024 game of the year despite extensive changes.

The developer was widely criticised for not providing full credits for localisation teams involved in the game. Vincke blamed the error on Larian's localisation provider, Altagram, and promised a fix. Altagram published an apology. Larian released a physical edition of the game but the disc did not contain the full game, instead providing a downloader for it. The game's full soundtrack was distributed across three discs, and it featured a cloth-printed map, stickers, and a chalk-paper mind flayer poster.

== Reception ==
Reception

Aggregate scores
Aggregator	Score
Metacritic	(PC) 96/100 (PS5) 96/100 (XBSX) 99/100
OpenCritic	96% recommend

Review scores
Publication	Score
Eurogamer	4/5
Game Informer	9.5/10
GameSpot	10/10
GamesRadar+	5/5
IGN	10/10
Jeuxvideo.com	19/20
MeriStation	10/10
NME	5/5
PC Gamer (US)	97%
Polygon	Recommended
Push Square	10/10
TechRadar	5/5
The Guardian	5/5

According to review aggregator website Metacritic, Baldur's Gate 3 received "universal acclaim" from critics, with 98% of critics recommending the game on aggregator OpenCritic. Critics praised the game's detail and scope, with several comparing the studio to a gracious dungeon master, and describing the game as faithfully emulating the tabletop Dungeons and Dragons experience. The Guardian's Nick Rueben said the game enabled players to solve problems creatively. Several reviews praised the game's production quality, citing the cinematics, performance capture, and fully voiced cast. Polygon's Gita Jackson described the game as a "masterpiece" with limits imposed by a flawed tabletop predecessor.

The writing received wide praise. IGN's Leana Hafer said the side quests were "strong", with Allen Van Aken praising quest outcome variety; Dekker said the game rightly prioritised player freedom over satisfying quest resolution. Eurogamer's Ruth Cassidy criticised the main narrative as having false urgency. Windows Central's Jennifer Young said narrative decisions had weight because almost every character could die. PCMag's reviewers criticised that some choices could inadvertently prevent players accessing some plot lines. The Dark Urge character origin received dedicated coverage.

Several reviews praised the characters as elevating the narrative above standard fantasy tropes and archetypes. Andrew Zucosky, the reviewer for Digital Trends, said the companions' stories were his main motivation for playing. Ali Jones said companions' personalities contrasted well with their character classes—for example, Shadowheart as a healer "[serving] a goddess of darkness and loss" and Karlach as a traumatised barbarian "determined to draw on joy". Jackson praised the companion's reactivity, highlighting the vampire spawn Astarion's embrace of his freedom. Eurogamer's Ruth Cassidy criticised the rushed initiation of romance arcs, while PCMag's reviewers praised them for developing naturally and being "unabashedly sexual". Hafer and Jones praised the romance overall, with Jones describing the approach as more "mature" than "picking the right dialogue options". A month after launch, Vincke explained that a bug had made companions "so horny".

Some reviewers praised BG3's combat, citing the range of options, reactivity, and approaches enabling combat avoidance. Eric Van Allen of Destructoid said combat "ranges from interesting to overwhelming". Cassidy praised the game for encouraging positional strategy and preparation. Two critics suggested that the game's complexity would be divisive. Some reviewers described combat as tedious. Polygon's Maddy Myers criticised some elements as unintuitive, citing how weapons are dipped in poison by interacting with them as if they are a health potion instead of the "dip weapon" function. Jackson said she saved before every combat encounter because random outcomes often had devastating, uncontrollable consequences. Young said combat would be "daunting" to D&D newcomers.

There were complaints about bugs and diminishing polish in later portions of the game. The original review by Digital Foundry's Alex Battaglia said the PC version's technical polish was impressive. Following suggestions by players to review the end of the game, Battaglia noted substantial performance drops in the third act caused by the city's density. Rebekah Valentine said the game's size concealed issues with the final act, describing it as less polished than the preceding two; several other reviewers highlighted bugs. Writing for Digital Spy, Jess Lee said "cracks began to show" in act three, citing two companions reacting with relationship-ending anger to a decision and forgetting shortly thereafter. According to IGN, bug complaints persisted months beyond release; (Note: After the game's final patch in April 2025, PC Gamer celebrated that Larian did not fix a "fan-favorite bug that turns character portraits into moody glamor shots".) the game's first major patch fixed over 1000 bugs. PC Gamer's Fraser Brown, meanwhile, expressed surprise at how few bugs surfaced on his playthrough given BG3's scope and complexity.

=== Sales ===
Prior to the game's full release, Jason Schreier wrote that its success was likely, citing positive reception to the early access, strong pre-order sales, and high interest in the Dungeons and Dragons property. The game sold 2.5 million copies during the early access period. It became one of 2023's largest launches after release. In February 2024, Larian's publishing director Michael Douse said the game had over 10 million players. (Note: Douse was reacting to a leaked Microsoft memo justifying a $5 million cost to acquire Baldur's Gate 3 for their subscription service by describing the game as a "second-run Stadia RPG".) As of 2023, Larian has not released precise sales figures. The Irish Independent reported in November 2024 that Larian's 2023 pre-tax profit reached €249 million, a twentyfold increase from the previous year, (Note: Of 2022, PC Gamer's Ted Litchfield wrote: "The company reported €22.7 million ($24 million) in total revenue, with Larian actually operating at a €214,000 ($223,000) loss. It's a pretty stark reminder of how volatile the business of making games can be, with developers having to spend a great deal of money over a long period of time before (hopefully) making it all up and then some with a successful launch.") and that the game had thus far sold 15 million copies.

Vincke described the game's performance as "way beyond" expectations; he had been concerned the game's entire audience had purchased it during early access. In a Q4 2023 earnings call, Wizards of the Coast's parent company Hasbro said the game had earned the company $90 million. Douse said the game's player count increased 20% over 2024, with IGN's Wesley Yin-Poole attributing this to modding support. By the end of 2025, the game had sold over 20 million copies.

== Accolades ==
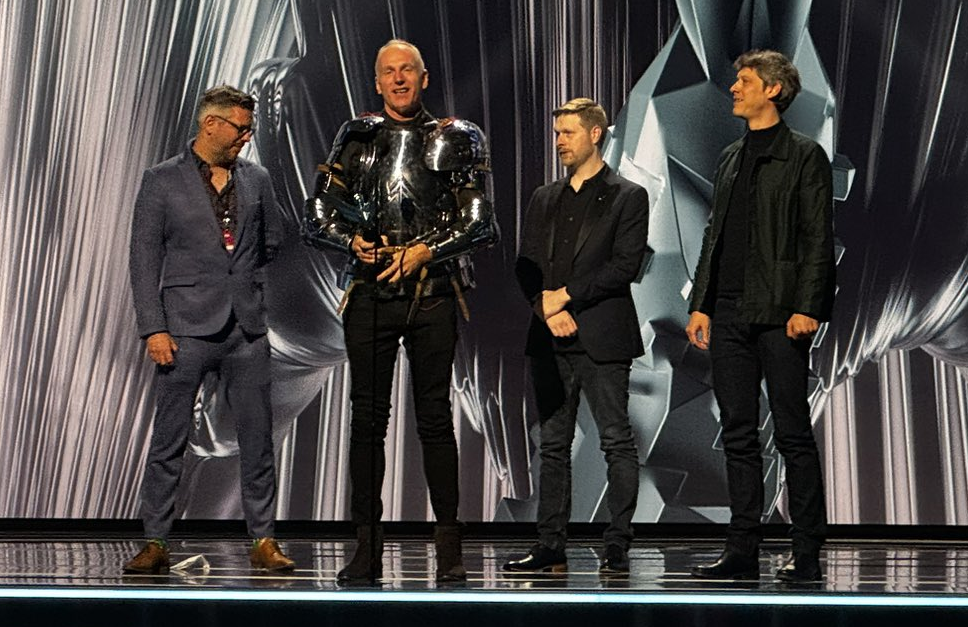
Larian Studios acceptance speech after receiving Game of the Year at The Game Awards 2023

Baldur's Gate 3 had record-breaking award success continuing over a year beyond its release. According to Vincke, Larian sent rotating groups of staff to award ceremonies because it started to impact the studio's development activities. In April 2024, the game became the first to win Game of the Year, or the equivalent category, at all five major ceremonies: the Golden Joystick Awards, the Game Developers Choice Awards, the D.I.C.E. Awards, the BAFTAs, and The Game Awards. Several publications also selected Baldur's Gate 3 as the best title of the year, including Ars Technica, GameSpot, GamesRadar+, and PC Gamer. It won the 2024 Hugo Award for Best Game or Interactive Work.

At the Golden Joystick Awards, the game broke the previous record with seven wins, including Best Storytelling, Best Visual Design, and Studio of the Year for Larian. At The Game Awards, the game won in six of the nine nominated categories, including Best Role Playing Game, Best Community Support, and Best Multiplayer Game. Baldur's Gate 3 was one of two titles to win multiple awards at the 27th Annual D.I.C.E. Awards, (Note: The other title was Marvel's Spider-Man 2; with 6 wins, it was the most-awarded title of the 2024 ceremony.) receiving Role-Playing Game of the Year alongside Outstanding Achievements in Story, Game Design, and Game Direction. At the BAFTA Game Awards, the title won five awards; lead writer Sarah Baylus and composer Borislav Slavov accepted the awards for Best Narrative and Best Music, respectively. At the 24th Game Developers Choice Awards in San Francisco, it received four awards, including Best Narrative and Best Design. It led The Steam Awards in 2023 with two wins, including Game of the Year and Outstanding Story-Rich Game.

The game's performances received awards recognition. Neil Newbon (Astarion) won Best Supporting Performer at the Golden Joysticks and Best Performance at The Game Awards. Newbon shared nominations with the game's narrator, Amelia Tyler, at several ceremonies, including the New York Game Awards and the Golden Joysticks. Newbon's performance was also nominated at the DICE Awards alongside Samantha Béart (Karlach). At the BAFTAs, Newbon, Béart and Tyler were nominated for Performer in a Leading Role. There were three nominations for the Performer in a Supporting Role award: Tracy Wiles (Jaheira), Dave Jones (Halsin) and Andrew Wincott (Raphael), with Wincott's performance winning. Several awards were for BG3's LGBTQ representation. It won the GLAAD Media Award for Outstanding Video Game. At the 2024 Gayming Awards, it received four nominations, including two for Best LGBTQ Character, winning with Shadowheart, and the Game of the Year.

The game's score, and composer Borislav Slavov, received several nominations. In 2020 and 2021, he received Hollywood Music in Media Awards nominations for Original Song – Video Games ("Weeping Dawn" and "I Want to Live", respectively), and for the full score in 2023. Slavov was nominated for Best Score and Music at The Game Awards. Slavov won in the Music category at the BAFTAs.

== Future ==
Following its release, Larian Studios reiterated their commitment to supporting the game further but would not commit to downloadable content (DLC). While delivering a March 2024 talk at Game Developers Conference, game director Swen Vincke said the studio would not develop a sequel or DLC. While Larian started work on DLC because of fan demand, there was no passion for the idea internally. Larian subsequently said it was working on two projects, using their own intellectual property for both and targeting a pre-2030 release for the first.

=== Television series ===
HBO announced the development of a television series continuing the story of Baldur's Gate 3, set to be helmed by Craig Mazin, co-creator of HBO's adaptation of The Last of Us. Mazin indicated that he would contact the voice cast to gauge their interest in being involved. Vincke said Mazin and HBO had reached out to Larian for their input, and expressed excitement on behalf of the studio.

=== Other media ===
In April 2026, Penguin Random House announced an upcoming publishing program based on Baldur's Gate 3. This includes the prequel novel Baldur's Gate 3: Astarion by T. Kingfisher, which released on September 29, 2026; Baldur's Gate 3 senior writer Stephen Rooney was a consultant on the novel. The audiobook edition was narrated by Astarion's voice actor Neil Newbon. At San Diego Comic-Con 2026, Dark Horse Comics teased an upcoming Baldur's Gate III comic series. In October 2026, Dark Horse announced that writer Alyssa Wong and artist Vincenzo Carratù will helm the first six-issue arc of the ongoing series; this arc will focus on Astarion. The second 12-issue arc will focus on Karlach and will be written by Becky Cloonan, with art by Francesco Scimonelli.

== See also ==
- List of Dungeons & Dragons video games
