= Neil Newbon =

English actor (born 1977)

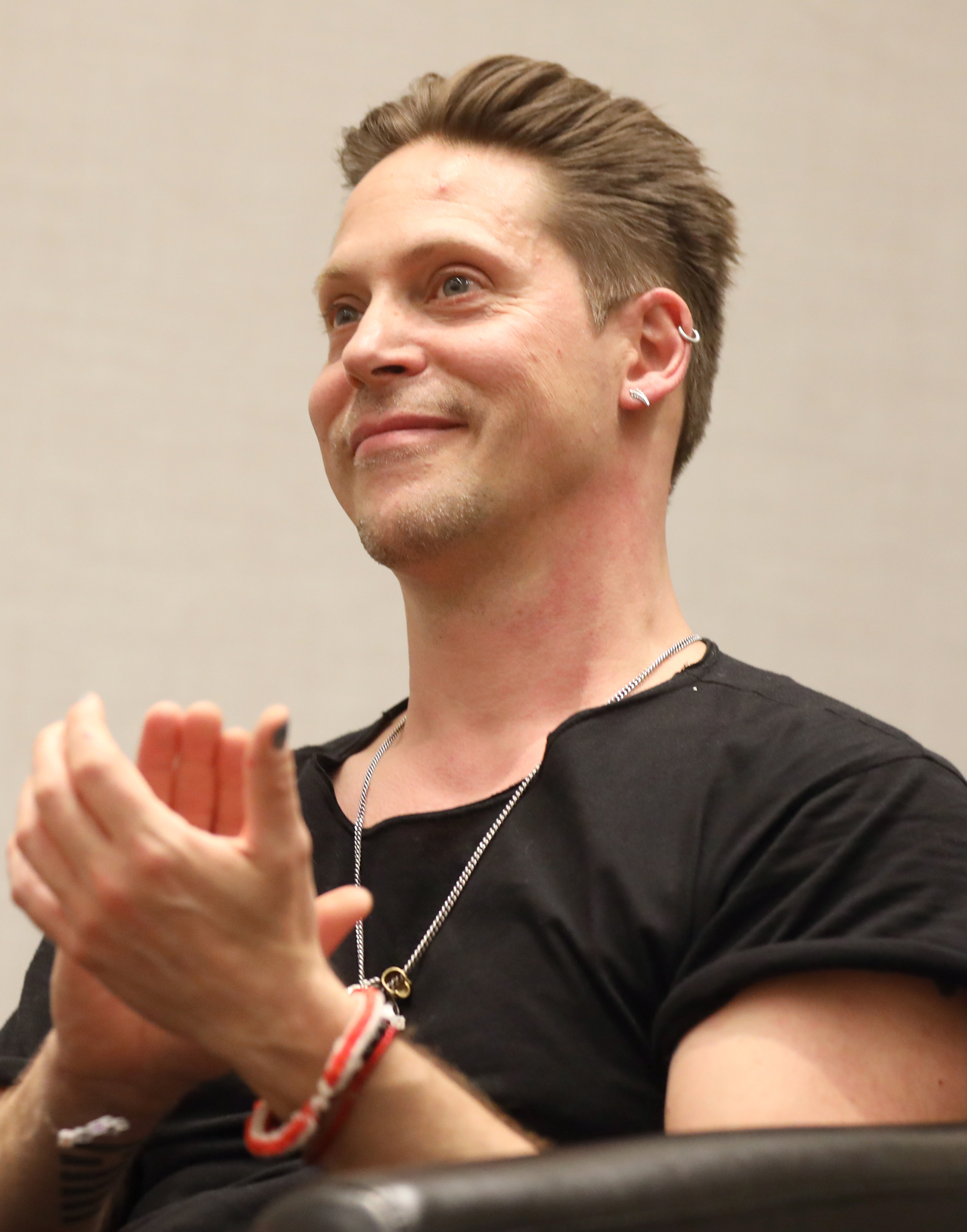
- Newbon in 2024
- Born: Neil Christie Newbon; 14 August 1977 (age 49); Birmingham, England
- Occupation: Actor
- Years active: 1993–present
- Spouses: China Moo-Young (m. 2012; div. 2015) Saleta Losada (m. 2023)
- Children: 1
- Relatives: Gary Newbon (father)

Neil Christie Newbon (born 14 August 1977) is an English actor known for voicing Elijah Kamski and Gavin Reed in Detroit: Become Human, Nicholai Ginovaef in Resident Evil 3, Karl Heisenberg in Resident Evil Village, Zeon in Xenoblade Chronicles 3 and Astarion in Baldur's Gate 3, for which he won the Game Award for Best Performance.

== Early life ==
Neil Christie Newbon was born in Birmingham on 14 August 1977, the son of sports presenter Gary Newbon. He is of Scottish descent on his mother's side and Belarusian descent on his father's side. His sister Claire is a journalist, while his twin brother Laurence is a cameraman. He played football as a teenager, usually as a goalkeeper.

== Career ==
In 1998, Newbon appeared in the BBC Two comedy series Goodness Gracious Me as James ('Jamms'), a waiter in the show's notable "Going for an English" sketch. He has appeared in numerous films. He voiced a tank driver in Jackboots on Whitehall. He starred in the music videos for the Now Voyager Mix of "You Got the Love" by The Source and Candi Staton in 2006 and "Kingdom of Rust" by Doves in 2009. In 2012, he joined the cast of the Channel 4 soap opera Hollyoaks as Simon Walker.

Since 2012, Newbon has provided the voice and motion capture for numerous video game characters, including Elijah Kamski and Gavin Reed in Detroit: Become Human, Nicholai Ginovaef in Resident Evil 3, Karl Heisenberg in Resident Evil Village and Astarion in Baldur's Gate 3. For his performance as Astarion, he won Best Performance at the 2023 Game Awards as well as the Golden Joystick for Best Supporting Performer.

Newbon is a co-founder of the training facility Performance Captured Academy, which offers courses on motion capture for aspiring actors.

== Personal life ==
Newbon married film director China Moo-Young in October 2012, and they had one daughter together before divorcing in 2015. He confirmed that he was in a relationship with his Performance Captured Academy co-founder Saleta Losada in 2018, and they were married in June 2023.

Newbon has trained in various martial arts for over 16 years, including kung fu (in the styles Crane, Shaolin, Snake, and Tiger), kickboxing, judo, and Wadō-ryū karate.

== Filmography ==
=== Film ===
Year	Title	Role	Notes
2001	The Discovery of Heaven	Quinten	
2006	The Last Drop	Cpl. Rhys Powell	
2006	Are You Ready for Love?	Rob	
2008	Beyond the Rave	Nikolai	Direct-to-video
2010	Jackboots on Whitehall	Tank Driver	Voice
2014	Extinction	Rob	
2016	Kingsglaive: Final Fantasy XV	Petra Fortis	Voice; English dub Also motion capture for Nyx Ulric

=== Television ===
Year	Title	Role	Notes
1993	Chris Cross	Garrett	Episode: "Saturday Night"
1997	Wycliffe	Rob Tyzack	Episode: "Close to Home"
1998	Goodness Gracious Me	James	Uncredited; 1 episode
1998–2007	The Bill	Ian Robbins, Dominic Mileham, Gavin Sullivan, Billy Peters	7 episodes
1999	Dalziel and Pascoe	ET	Episode: "Time to Go"
2000	Rhona	Art Model	Episode: "The Happy Jeans"
2000	Queen of Swords	Anton	Episode: "The Witness"
2002	Stranded	Ernst Robinson	Television film
2002	As If	Seb	2 episodes
2003	The Afternoon Play	Malcolm Haye	Episode: "Turkish Delight"
2003–04	Dream Team	Luke Davenport	19 episodes
2009	Holby City	Gavin Sheldon	Episode: "Take Her Breath Away"
2009	Henry VIII: The Mind of a Tyrant	Lord Mounjoy, Culpepper's Inquisitor	2 episodes
2009	New Tricks	Justin Milburn	Episode: "Blood Is Thicker Than Water"
2009, 2014	Doctors	Kenny Foulton, Michael Faulks	2 episodes
2010	I Shouldn't Be Alive	Steve Callahan	Episode: "76 Days Adrift"
2012–13	Hollyoaks	Simon Walker	63 episodes
2012	Hollyoaks Later	Simon Walker	4 episodes
2015	Residue	Osbourne, Keller's Aide	3 episodes
2016	Locked Up Abroad	Matthew VanDyke	Episode: "Gaddafi's American Prisoner"
2017	Casualty	Father Anthony Bridge	1 episode

=== Video games ===
Year	Title	Role	Notes
2012	The Secret World	John Galahad, Thutmose, Father Lucian, Adrian Zorlescu	
2014	Castlevania: Lords of Shadow 2	—N/a	Motion capture
2015	Until Dawn	—N/a	Motion capture
2017	Spacelords	Additional Voices	
2017	Elite Dangerous	Commander John Jameson	
2017	Planet of the Apes: Last Frontier	Bryn, Mikey, Additional Voices	
2018	Detroit: Become Human	Elijah Kamski, Gavin Reed	Also motion capture
2018	Strange Brigade	—N/a	Motion capture
2018	Forza Horizon 4	—N/a	Motion capture
2019	We Happy Few	Nick Lightbearer	Lightbearer DLC
2020	Resident Evil 3	Nicholai Ginovaef	Also motion capture for Brad Vickers, Nemesis and Robert Kendo
2020	Resident Evil: Resistance	Nicholai Ginovaef	Also motion capture
2020	Beyond a Steel Sky	Alonso	
2021	Resident Evil Village	Karl Heisenberg	Also motion capture Also Shadows of Rose DLC
2022	Star Wars: The Old Republic	Major Dosk, Additional Voices	Legacy of the Sith and Disorder DLC
2022	Xenoblade Chronicles 3	Zeon	
2023	Deliver Us Mars	Isaac Johanson	
2023	Final Fantasy XVI	Additional Voices	
2023	Baldur's Gate 3	Astarion	Also motion capture
2023	Warframe	Fibonacci	Whispers in the Walls expansion
2024	Fallout: London	Barry the Boat	
2024	Vampire Survivors	Dracula	Ode to Castlevania DLC
2024	Warframe	Viktor Vodyanoi	Warframe: 1999 expansion
2025	Lies of P	Lumacchio	Overture DLC
2025	Date Everything!	Drysdale	
2025	Dead Take	Chase Lowry	
2026	Marathon	Darius	
2027	Until Dawn 2	Sebastian	
TBA	Where Birds Sleep †	Cormo	

=== Stage ===
Year	Title	Role	Venue
2025	Dungeons & Dragons: The Twenty-Sided Tavern	Mage	Stage 42

=== Web series ===
Year	Title	Role	Notes	Ref.
2026	Dungeon Masters	Professor Crem de la Crem (campaign one)	Actual play cast member	
2026	Dungeon Masters	Sailor (campaign two)	Actual play cast member	

=== Audio books ===
Year	Title	Role	Notes	Ref.
2026	Baldur's Gate 3: Astarion	Narrator, Astarion		

== Awards and nominations ==
Year	Award	Category	Nominated work	Result	Ref.
2023	Golden Joystick Awards	Best Supporting Performer	Baldur's Gate 3	Won	
2023	The Game Awards	Best Performance	Baldur's Gate 3	Won	
2024	New York Game Awards	Great White Way Award for Best Acting in a Game	Baldur's Gate 3	Nominated	
2024	D.I.C.E. Awards	Outstanding Achievement in Character	Baldur's Gate 3	Nominated	
2024	British Academy Games Awards	Performer in a Leading Role	Baldur's Gate 3	Nominated	
