= Borislav Slavov =

Music composer

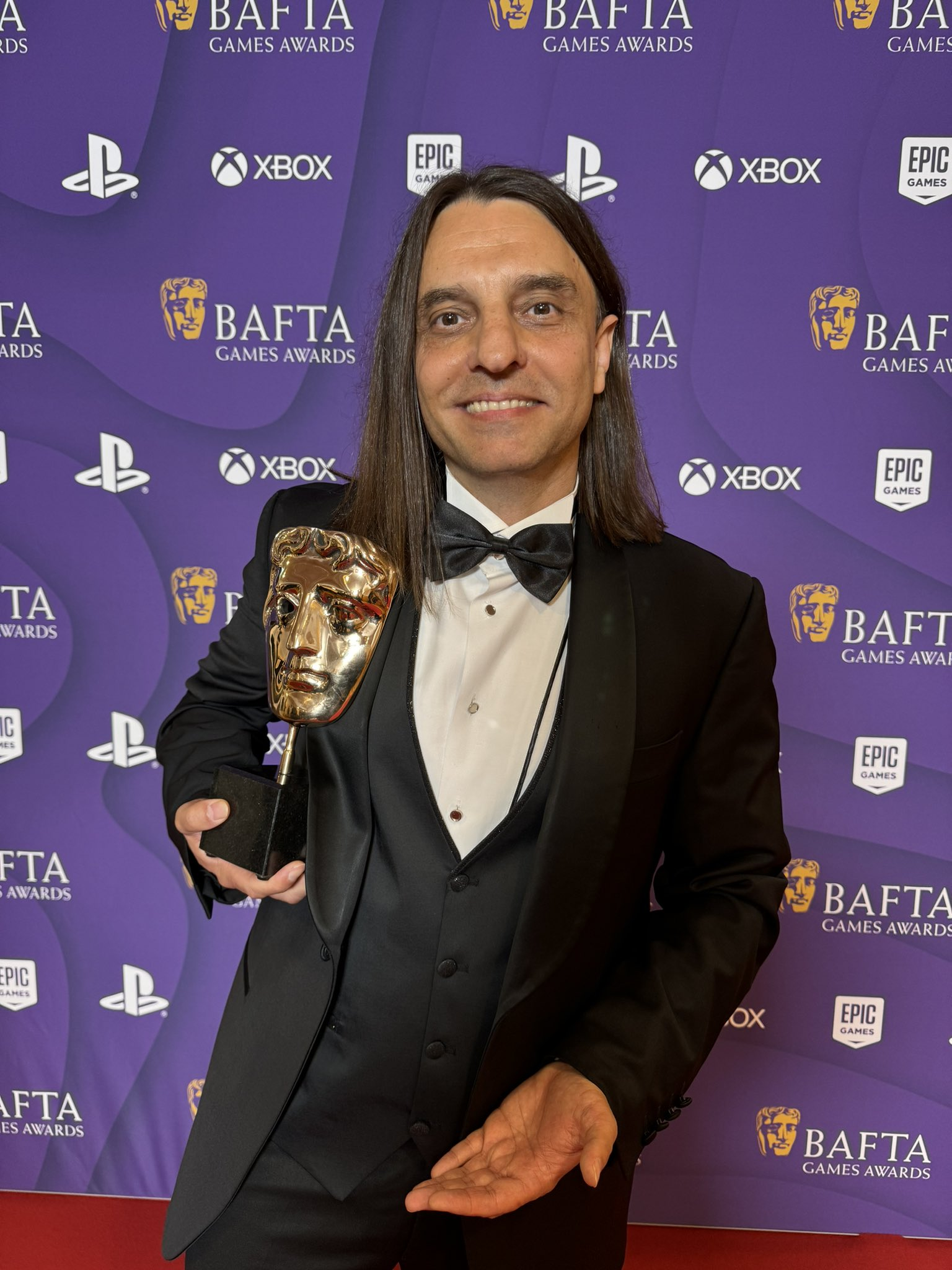
- Slavov during the 2024 BAFTA Games Awards
- Born: 1973 (age 52–53); Sofia, Bulgaria
- Occupation: Composer
- Known for: Baldur's Gate 3 soundtrack

Borislav Slavov (born 1973) is a Bulgarian composer. He has composed for a number of video games, including for Crytek's Crysis series and Larian Studios' Divinity: Original Sin II and Baldur's Gate 3.

== Early life ==
Slavov was born in 1973 in Sofia, Bulgaria. In 2002, he completed a master's degree in computer science and began working for a software company, but eventually switched fields to music. Slavov has stated that his experience in IT helped him in his later career as a video game composer, but not being classically trained was challenging and meant he had to catch up.

== Works ==
Slavov composed the soundtrack for Baldur's Gate 3, for which he won the award for best music from the British Academy Games Award. He has also composed for Crysis 2, Crysis 3, Ryse: Son of Rome, Warface and Divinity: Original Sin II. Knights of Honor was the first commercial title he composed for.

== Awards ==
Year	Award	Category	Recipient	Result	Refs.
2020	11th Hollywood Music in Media Awards	Original Song – Video Game	Borislav Slavov (for Weeping Dawn)	Nominated	
2021	12th Hollywood Music in Media Awards	Original Song – Video Game	Borislav Slavov (for I Want to Live)	Nominated	
2023	14th Hollywood Music in Media Awards	Original Score – Video Game	Borislav Slavov (for Baldur's Gate 3)	Nominated	
2023	The Game Awards 2023	Best Score and Music	Borislav Slavov (for Baldur's Gate 3)	Nominated	
2024	BAFTA Games Awards 2024	Music - Video Game	Borislav Slavov (for Baldur's Gate 3)	Won	
