= Shadowheart =

- Baldur's Gate character
- Shadowheart as she appears in Baldur's Gate 3
- First game: Baldur's Gate 3 (2023)
- Designed by: Stephanie Chafe (face); Tomos Hywel Evans (hair); Andreea Schbli (hair); Miguel Angel Pescador (hair)
- Voiced by: Jennifer English
- Motion capture: Jennifer English

In-universe information
- Race: Half-elf
- Class: Cleric

Shadowheart, in-universe birth name Jenevelle Hallowleaf, is a character in Larian Studios' Baldur's Gate 3, a role-playing video game set in the Forgotten Realms universe of Dungeons & Dragons. Voiced by Jennifer English, she is a half-elf and can be recruited as a party member in the game's first act. She is also an origin character, one of a set of characters with a predefined background the player may choose to play as. The player may also pursue a romance with the character.

Written by John Corcoran, Shadowheart was originally conceived as a very "sassy" character, inspired by Jason Bourne from the Bourne franchise. Internal feedback ultimately led the writers to dial down her "sassy" personality. Initially a "guarded and prickly" character, Shadowheart was given several alternate paths through which the player may get her to evolve away from that initial personality. To plan a possible romance scene with fellow party member and origin character Lae'zel, Corcoran sat down with his counterpart, ultimately realizing their characters had inherently similar backgrounds which they could use to plan the relationship.

Shadowheart was well-received as a party member, becoming the game's most popular romance option and earning best LGBTQ+ Character in the Gayming Awards 2024. Multiple commentators praised her character arc and overall importance in Baldur's Gate 3's narrative. Her romance scenes were also commended by commentators, with an emphasis on their diversity and Shadowheart's overall opening up during said scenes. Scholars have discussed Shadowheart's trauma and its connection to the goddess Shar. Several merchandise products have been released based on the character.

== Conception and design ==
Shadowheart's face was designed by lead character artist Stephanie Chafe, while her hair was designed as a collaborative project between Tomos Hywel Evans, Andreea Schbli and Miguel Angel Pescador. Shadowheart is a half-elf, a race in the Dungeons & Dragons universe composed of individuals of half human and half elf ancestry. Other than being a party member, Shadowheart is an origin character, one of multiple characters with a predefined backstory that the player may select to play as.

When pitching the game's party members, the narrative team originally wanted to create a group of people that did not trust each other, but would grow to trust each other in time. In order to make other party members distrustful of Shadowheart, they designed a character with a very "sassy" personality. To do that, the narrative team was inspired by Jason Bourne, the titular character of the Bourne franchise. Internal feedback ultimately led the narrative team to heavily dial down the character's sassiness. Shadowheart's narrative design went through several iterations, initially being conceived as a very "guarded and prickly" character. Due to player response in the game's early access, Shadowheart was given various alternate paths, so that, should the player choose the right options, the character may evolve away from that early concept. For her possible romance scene with fellow party member and origin character Lae'zel, Shadowheart's writer, John Corcoran, had to sit down with his counterpart Kevin VanOrd to discuss how a relationship between two conflicting characters would work. The writers ultimately realized that they were writing a similar story from different directions, something they used to reframe their initial conflict into a relationship.

=== Voice acting ===
Shadowheart was voiced and motion captured by Jennifer English, while Aliona Baranova served as motion capture performance director. English described Baldur's Gate 3's voice acting process as "hugely creative and collaborative", with voice actors working together with voice directors and movement directors in defining the character and taking voice actor feedback into account. During the voice acting process, English was reluctant to record one of her character's most recognizable lines, "God's favorite princess". Only after being pressured by Baranova, with whom she had begun a relationship, did she agree to record it. In an interview, English described Shadowheart's character arc as a "trans allegory". To make voice actors more comfortable with performing romance scenes, Larian Studios made use of intimacy coordinators.

== Appearances ==
Shadowheart was one of the five companions available during Baldur's Gate 3's early access. Shadowheart can first be encountered in Baldur's Gate 3's prologue mission aboard the Nautiloid, a massive flying ship used by a fictional species known as the Mind Flayers, and will join the player's party if helped. Once in the first act of the game, the player will locate Shadowheart in one of three locations depending on whether they helped her or not. A cleric, Shadowheart follows a goddess known as Shar, the goddess of night, who wiped large parts of her memory and commanded her to carry a mysterious artifact known as the Astral Prism to a temple located in the city of Baldur's Gate without knowing its purpose. This devotion to the goddess Shar causes her chronic pain, which she describes as "her burden". Shadowheart is available as a romance option that the player may pursue.

In the game's second act, Shadowheart begins to question her loyalty towards Shar when seeing that she had been responsible for keeping the fictional town of Reithwin in darkness for over a century. Shadowheart becomes obsessed with the idea of becoming a sacred warrior in the service of her goddess, urging the player to complete a set of trials in a temple known as the Gauntlet of Shar, through which the player can access a prison dimension where Shar, alongside act villain Ketheric Thorm, had kept Nightsong, the immortal daughter of her rival goddess, Selûne. Shar then orders Shadowheart to end Nightsong's life using a specialized spear in exchange for obtaining the status she desired. The player can subsequently attempt to convince Shadowheart not to kill Nightsong and switch her allegiance to Selûne. Should the player decide the latter, Shadowheart's physical appearance changes, having her hair turn from black to white. Shadowheart's story concludes in the game's third and final act, where the player discovers a secret Shar base holding Shadowheart's birth parents hostage and is ultimately tasked with deciding their fate. During this quest, Shadowheart also learns she had been kidnapped from her parents by followers of Shar as a child and her real name: Jenevelle Hallowleaf.

== Promotion and reception ==
As a part of various Baldur's Gate 3 product lines, several merchandise products have been created based on the character. Funko launched a Funko Pop! figure based on Shadowheart. WizKids manufactured numerous officially licensed figurines, including one of Shadowheart. Upon release, these figurines were criticized for their poor quality, prompting WizKids to issue an official apology and a full refund on the figurines without needing to return them. Multiple Magic: The Gathering cards were released based on the game's roster, including one of Shadowheart as a part of the Secret Lair x Dungeons & Dragons: Shadowheart's Devotion pack. A Nendoroid collectible figure is set to debut in Japan in February 2027.

Shadowheart has been well-received as a party member, earning best LGBTQ+ character in the Gayming Awards 2024. Shadowheart headed Matthew Byrd's list of best Baldur's Gate 3 characters written for Den of Geek. Byrd praised the quality of her character arc and her role in the game's overall narrative, stating that Shadowheart has the "most complete and compelling game-wide character arc". In a broad discussion regarding Baldur's Gate 3's party members, PC Gamer staff argued that Shadowheart was one of the game's best characters. Harvey Randall argued that she was proof that Dungeons & Dragons' obsession with "alignment" and "evil gods" was not incompatible with complex characters, while Morgan Park praised her character evolution throughout his playthrough. Erick Romero of IGN Latin America argued that, because many of Baldur's Gate 3's plot points revolve around Shadowheart, she was the "true protagonist" of the game. Romero asserted that her early allegiance to the goddess Shar and the possible change in her appearance reinforce the thought that the decisions she has to deal with make her a clear candidate for an RPG protagonist.

Her romance arc has become increasingly popular, ultimately becoming the game's most popular romance option. Several commentators have praised Shadowheart's slow opening up during her romance scenes. Mateusz Miter of Dot Esports commended the diversity of the available player interactions with Shadowheart during her romance. Miter further argued that Shadowheart's inherent insecurities and stubbornness in her beliefs make specific moments, like seeing her "crack a joke", more adorable and dorky. IGN's Kazuma Koshimoto argued that, by having Shadowheart open up to the player slowly, her character reveals "a sense of vulnerability that feels more earnest than the other companions". Koshimoto further praised several of the character's moments and background, while criticizing the conclusion to her story.

Lars Johnson discussed Shadowheart's connection to the goddess Shar. Johnson argued that the "divine pain" that Shadowheart endures resembles the experiences of "medieval Christian mystics" such as Julian of Norwich and Margery Kempe while drawing comparisons with the arc of fellow Baldur's Gate 3 character Abdirak. Johnson further stated that the manipulation imposed by Shar demonstrates how "harmful authority, religious or otherwise can be when not derived from informed, wholehearted and explicit consent".
