= Seasick Steve discography =

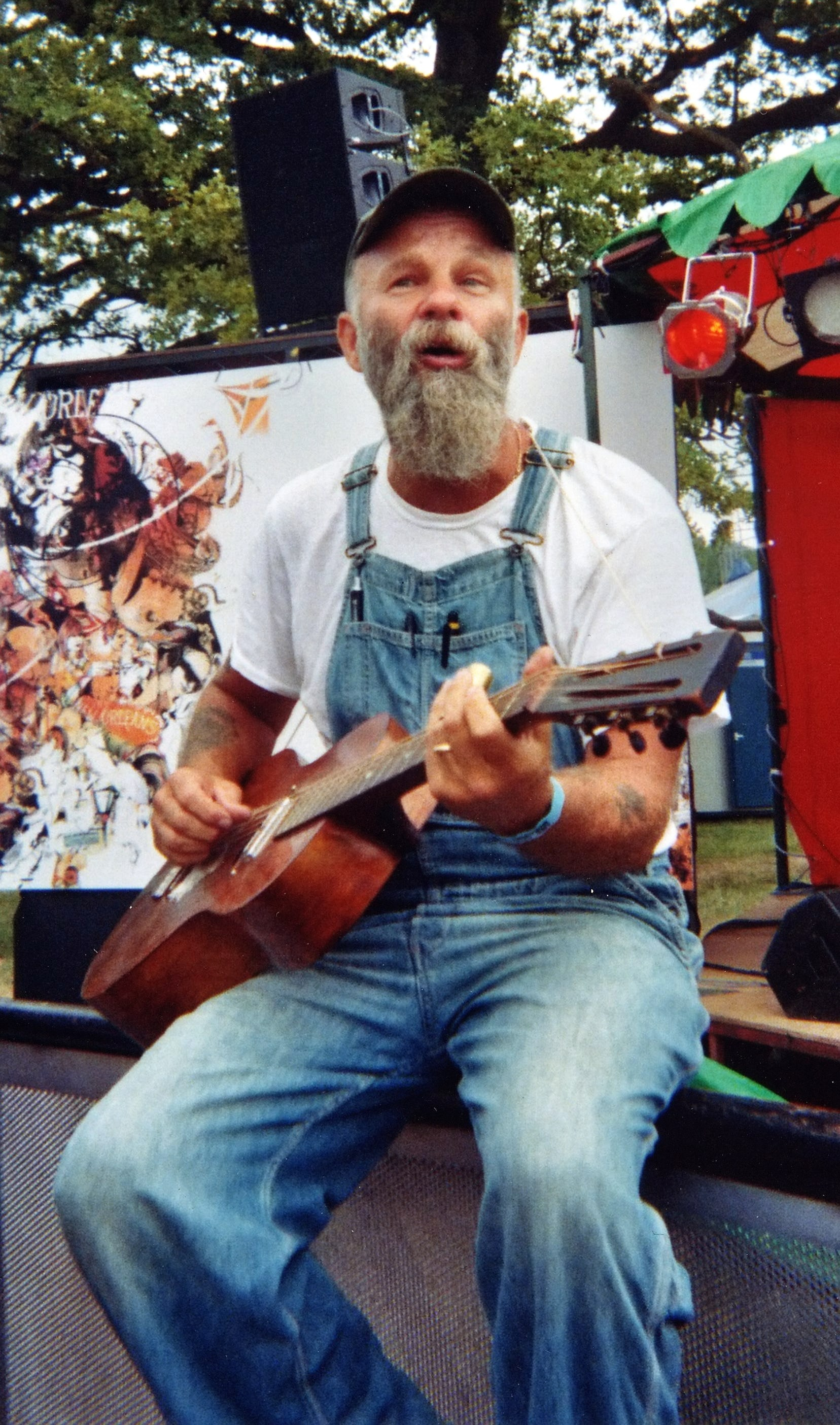
- Seasick Steve at The Big Chill 2006.
- Studio albums: 12
- Extended plays: 1
- Compilation albums: 2
- Singles: 10

This is the discography of American blues musician Seasick Steve. He has released twelve studio albums, two compilation albums, one Extended play and ten singles. He made his first UK television appearance on Jools Holland's annual Hootenanny BBC TV show on New Year's Eve 2006.

Cheap, Steve's debut studio album, was released in 2004. It consists of songs by him and his Swedish/Norwegian band The Level Devils, and also two stories from his life as a hobo. The Level Devils consisted at this time of Kai Christoffersen playing the drums and Jo Husmo bass. Dan Magnusson subsequently took over drumming duties.

Dog House Music, Steve's second studio album, was released in November 2006. The album peaked at No. 36 on the UK Albums Chart. The album is almost entirely performed by Steve, apart from snare drum on "Yellow Dog" and crash cymbal on "Fallen Off a Rock", performed by H.J. Wold, and drums on the hidden track by Steve's son P.M. Wold.

I Started Out with Nothin and I Still Got Most of It Left, Steve's third studio album, was released in September 2008. The album peaked to No. 9 on the UK Albums Chart. The album is his first on the record label Warner Bros. Records, but the vinyl releases are still on his old label, Bronzerat Records.

Man from Another Time, Steve's fourth studio album, was released in October 2009. The album peaked to No. 4 on the UK Albums Chart.

You Can't Teach an Old Dog New Tricks, Steve's fifth studio album, was released in May 2011. The album peaked to No. 6 on the UK Albums Chart. The album features former Led Zeppelin bass guitarist John Paul Jones.

Hubcap Music, Steve's sixth studio album, was released in April 2013. The album peaked at No. 14 on the UK Albums Chart. The title derives from his Morris Minor guitar made out of two hubcaps placed back-to-back. Steve uses the guitar frequently, both live and in the studio. The song "Down On The Farm" was debuted live at the 2012 Pinkpop Festival in the Netherlands. A music video was also released, with Seasick Steve dancing behind his farm with the hubcap guitar in his hand, in similar fashion to The Black Keys' song, "Lonely Boy". One week before the release, a video for "Purple Shadows" premiered, featuring Steve playing a stripped version of the song on the acoustic guitar.

Sonic Soul Surfer, Steve's seventh studio album, was released in March 2015. It was promoted with 4 singles : "Bring It On", "Summertime Boy", "Roy's Gang", and "Barracuda '68". His eighth studio album was released on October 7, 2016.

== Albums ==
=== Studio albums ===
Title	Details	Peak chart positions							Certifications (sales threshold)
Title	Details	AUS	BEL (Fl)	FRA	IRE	NL	SWE	UK	Certifications (sales threshold)
Cheap	Released: 2004; Format: Digital download, CD; Label: Bronzerat	—	—	—	—	—	—	198	
Dog House Music	Released: November 27, 2006; Format: Digital download, CD; Label: Bronzerat	—	99	—	69	—	—	36	UK: Gold
I Started Out with Nothin and I Still Got Most of It Left	Released: September 29, 2008; Format: Digital download, CD; Label: Warner Bros.	17	38	107	13	—	30	9	UK: Platinum
Man from Another Time	Released: October 19, 2009; Format: Digital download, CD; Label: Warner Bros.	—	13	191	15	70	—	4	UK: Gold
You Can't Teach an Old Dog New Tricks	Released: May 27, 2011; Format: Digital download, CD; Label: Play It Again Sam (UK) Third Man (US)	90	16	198	18	9	—	6	UK: Gold
Hubcap Music	Released: April 29, 2013; Format: Digital download, CD; Label: Fiction Third Man (US)	—	42	—	28	46	—	14	
Sonic Soul Surfer	Released: March 23, 2015; Format: Digital download, CD, vinyl, stream; Label: Caroline International Bronze Rat (US)	64	17	64	25	16	—	4	UK: Gold
Keepin' the Horse Between Me and the Ground	Released: October 7, 2016; Format: Digital download, CD, vinyl, stream; Label: There's a Dead Skunk	—	31	78	83	51	—	8	
Can U Cook?	Released: September 28, 2018; Format: Digital download, CD, vinyl, streaming; Label: BMG	—	66	—	—	197	—	27	
Love & Peace	Released: July 24, 2020; Format: Digital download, CD, vinyl, streaming; Label: Contagious Records	—	98	156	—	—	—	39	
Blues in Mono	Released: November 27, 2020; Format: Digital download, CD, vinyl, streaming; Label: There's a Dead Skunk	—	—	—	—	—	—	—	
Only on Vinyl	Released: September 23, 2022; Format: Vinyl; Label: There's a Dead Skunk	—	—	—	—	—	—	—	
A Trip a Stumble a Fall Down on Your Knees	Released: June 7, 2024; Format: Digital download, CD, vinyl, streaming; Label: SO Recordings	—	177	—	—	—	—	23	
"—" denotes an album that did not chart or was not released in that territory.

=== Compilation albums ===
Title	Album details	Peak chart positions	Certifications (sales threshold)
Title	Album details	UK	Certifications (sales threshold)
Songs For Elisabeth	Released: February 5, 2010; Format: Digital download, CD; Label: Atlantic, Rykodisc	33	UK: Silver
Walkin' Man – The Best of Seasick Steve	Released: 2011; Format: Digital download, CD; Label: Rhino	51	

== Extended plays ==
Title	EP details
It's All Good	Released: June 17, 2007; Format: Digital download; Label: Bronze Rat

== Singles ==
=== As lead artist ===
Year	Title	Peak chart positions		Album
Year	Title	UK	UK Indie	Album
2007	"Dog House Boogie"	187	—	Dog House Music
2008	"Cut My Wings"	151	—	Dog House Music
2008	"It's All Good"	—	5	Non-album single
2008	"St. Louis Slim"	—	—	I Started Out with Nothin' and I Still Got Most of It Left
2009	"Walkin' Man"	—	—	I Started Out with Nothin' and I Still Got Most of It Left
2009	"That's All"	—	—	Man from Another Time
2011	"Write Me a Few Lines"/"Levee Camp Blues"	—	—	You Can't Teach an Old Dog New Tricks
2013	"Coast Is Clear"	—	—	Hubcap Music
2015	"Bring It On"	—	—	Sonic Soul Surfer
2015	"Summertime Boy"	—	—	Sonic Soul Surfer
"—" denotes a single that did not chart or was not released in that territory.

== Other charted songs ==
Year	Title	Peak chart positions	Album
Year	Title	UK	Album
2008	"Started Out with Nothin"	124	I Started Out with Nothin and I Still Got Most of It Left
