= List of artists by number of UK Jazz & Blues Albums Chart number ones =

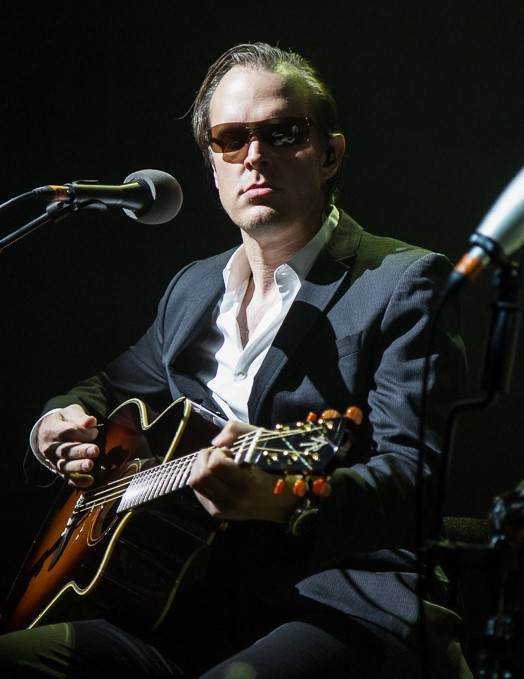
American blues musician Joe Bonamassa has topped the UK Jazz & Blues Albums Chart with 20 different releases (including three albums with Beth Hart) – more than any other artist.

The UK Jazz & Blues Albums Chart is a record chart which ranks the best-selling jazz and blues albums in the United Kingdom. Compiled and published by the Official Charts Company, the data is based on each album's weekly physical sales, digital downloads (since 2007) and streams (since 2015), and is currently published every Friday. As of the chart published on 11 April 2025, a total of 361 albums by 176 artists have topped the UK Jazz & Blues Albums Chart. The most successful artist is American blues musician Joe Bonamassa, who has topped the chart with 17 solo releases and three collaboration albums, spending a total of 47 weeks at number one.

== Artists ==
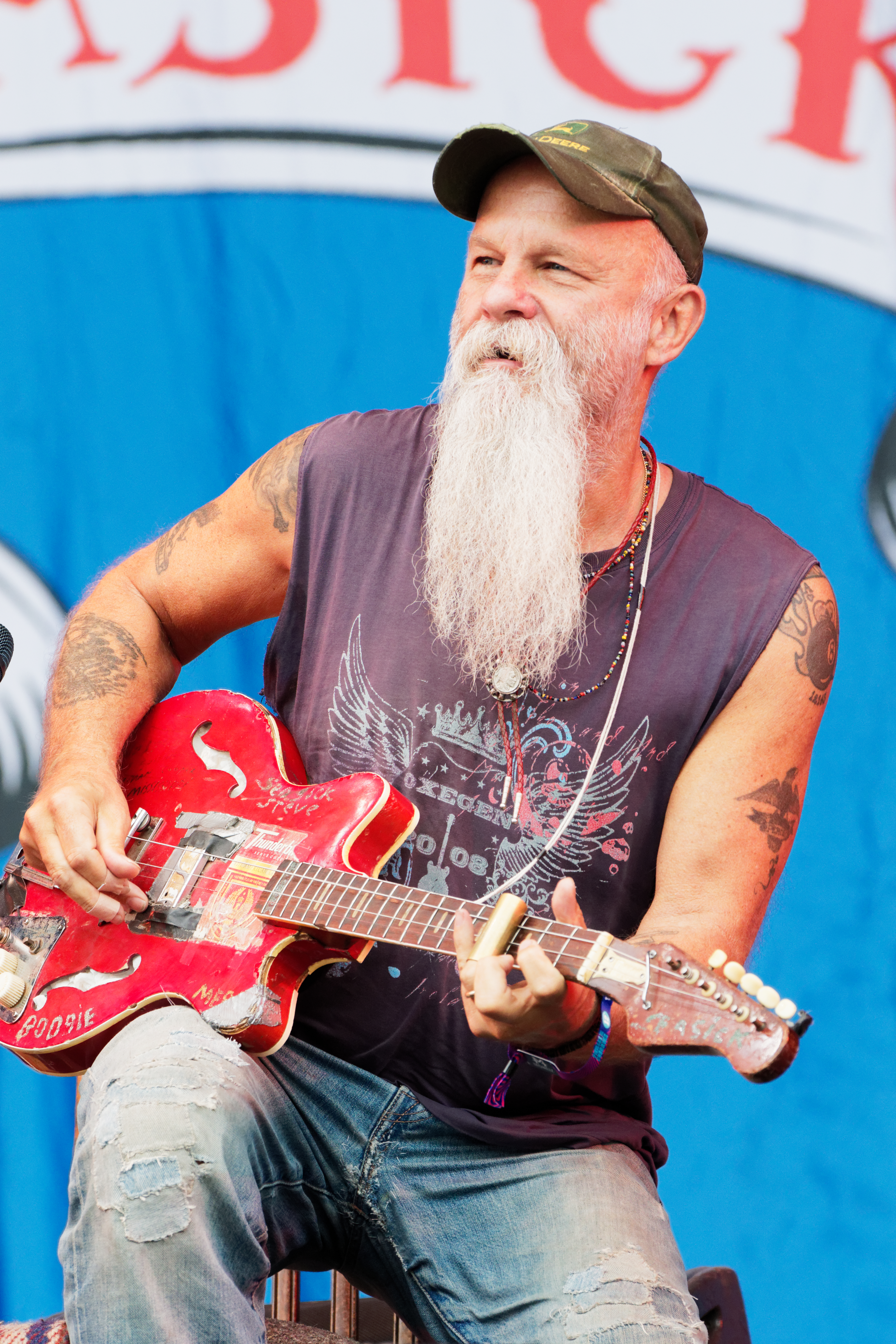
Seasick Steve has topped the chart with 12 releases, spending a total of 68 weeks at number one.

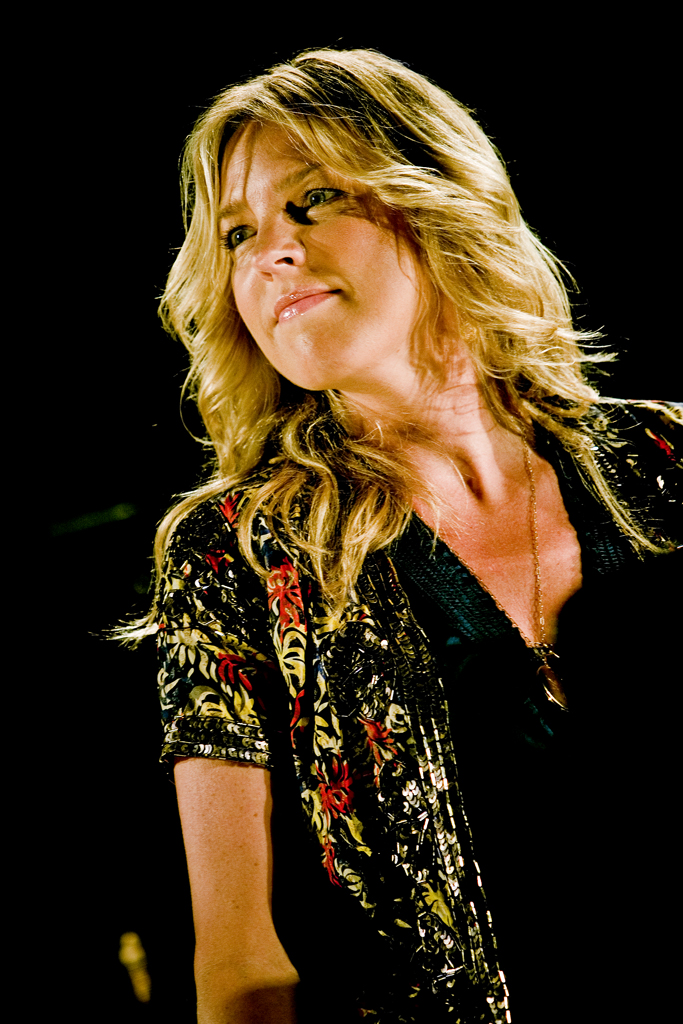
Nine albums by Diana Krall (including one alongside Tony Bennett) have topped the UK Jazz & Blues Albums Chart.

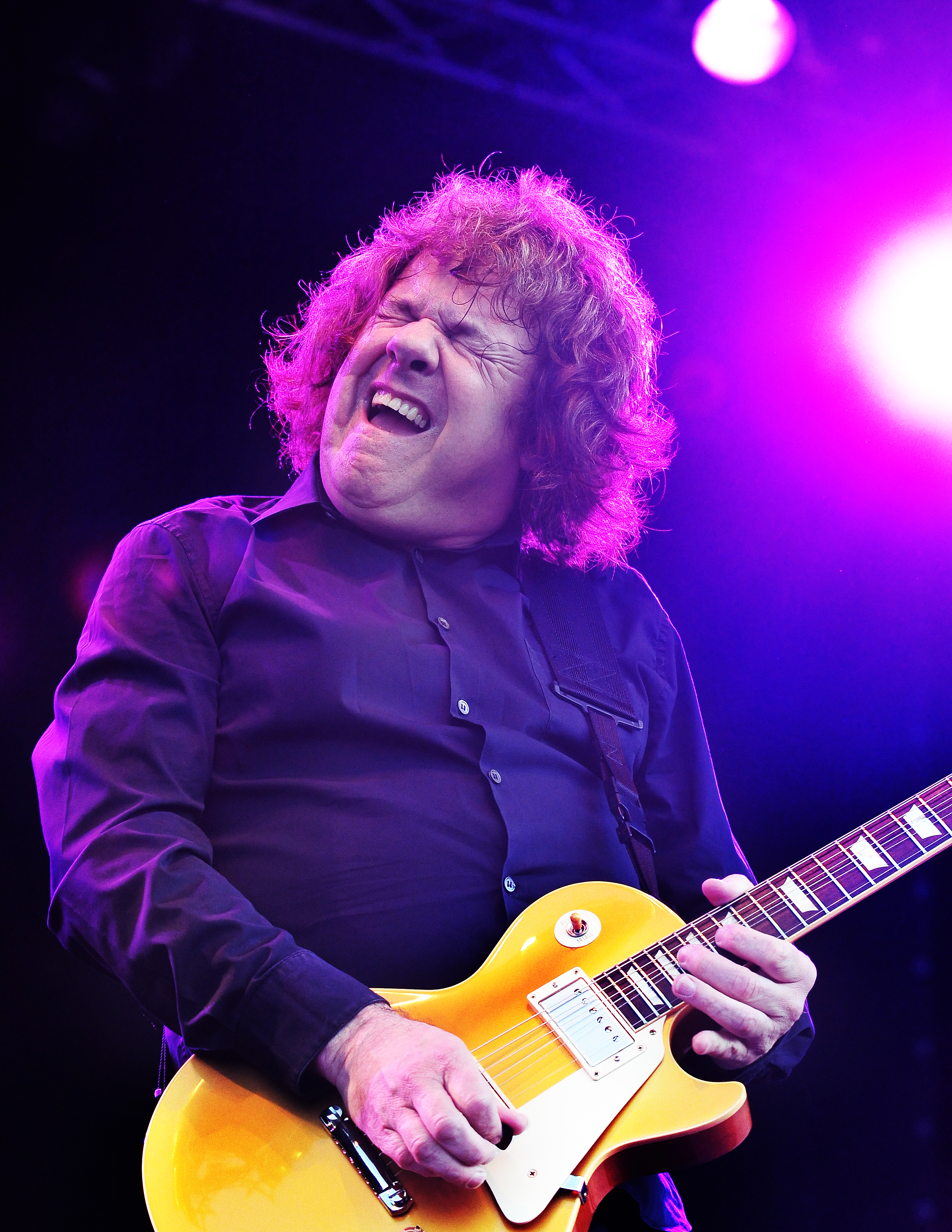
Gary Moore has spent 14 weeks at number one on the chart across eight studio, live and compilation albums.

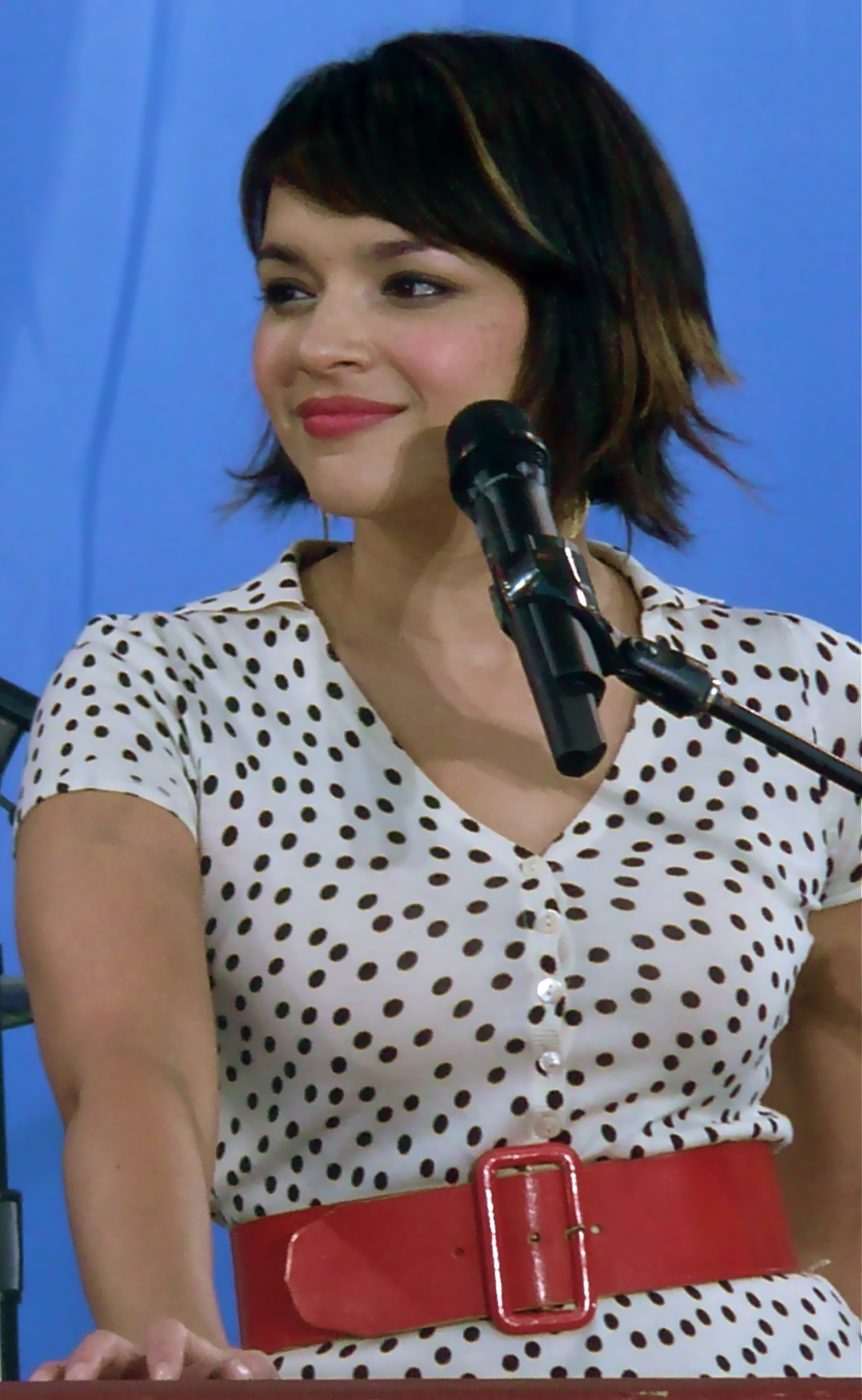
Seven albums by Norah Jones have reached number one, including her debut Come Away with Me which spent a record 75 weeks atop the chart.

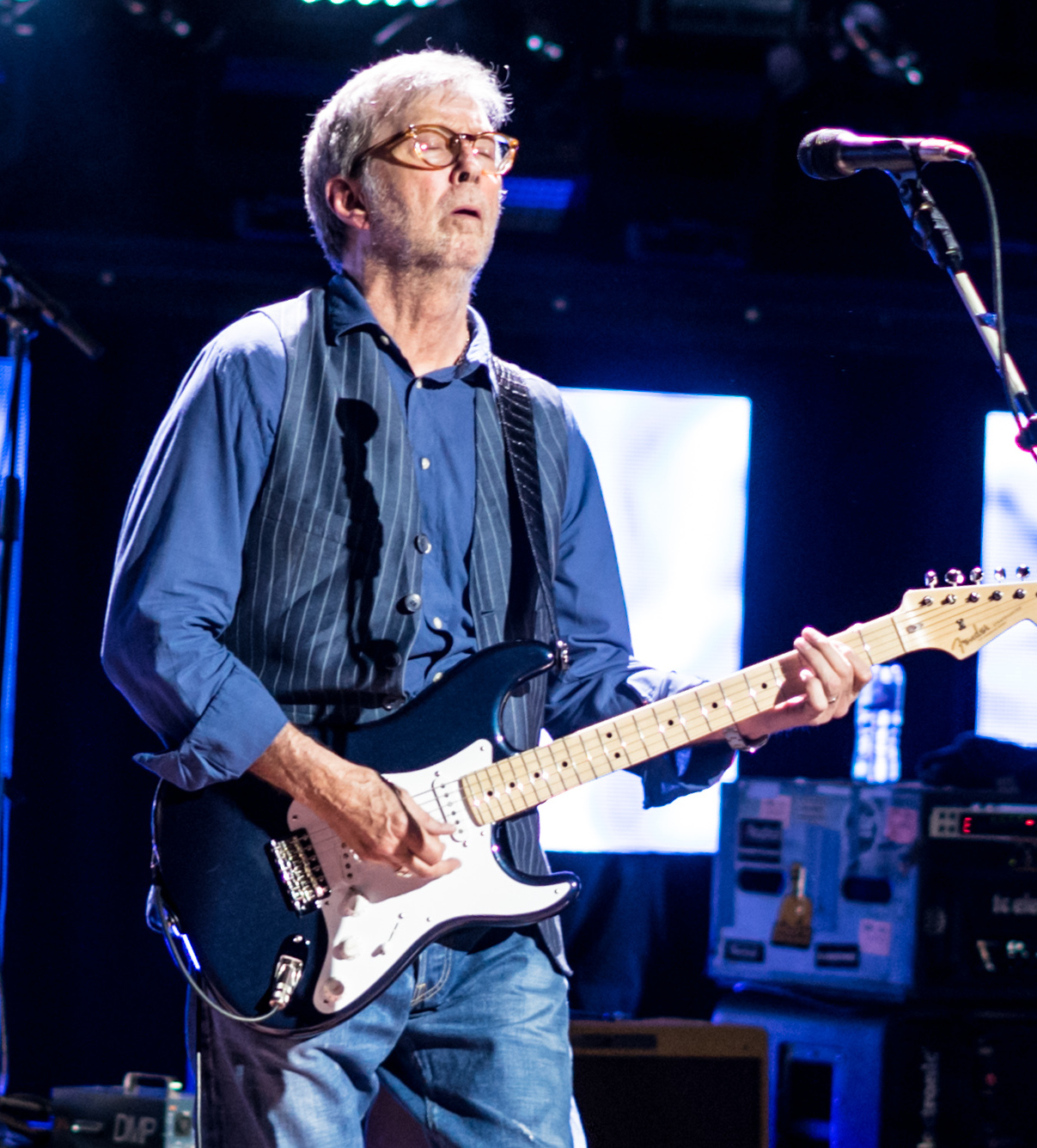
Eric Clapton has spent 52 weeks atop the UK Jazz & Blues Albums Chart with seven different albums.

The following artists have been credited on at least six different number one albums, as recognised by the OCC. Appearances on compilation albums featuring various artists are not included.

Key
†	Indicates that the album reached the top ten of the UK Albums Chart

Artist	Number-one albums	Number-one studio albums	Total weeks at number one	Albums	Record label(s)	First reached number one	Weeks at number one	Ref.
Joe Bonamassa	20	11	47	Black Rock	Provogue	28 March 2010	1	
Joe Bonamassa	20	11	47	Dust Bowl	Provogue	27 March 2011	1	
Joe Bonamassa	20	11	47	Don't Explain (with Beth Hart)	Provogue	2 October 2011	1	
Joe Bonamassa	20	11	47	Driving Towards the Daylight †	Provogue	27 May 2012	12	
Joe Bonamassa	20	11	47	Beacon Theatre: Live from New York	Provogue	30 September 2012	1	
Joe Bonamassa	20	11	47	An Acoustic Evening at the Vienna Opera House	Provogue	31 March 2013	1	
Joe Bonamassa	20	11	47	Live in Amsterdam (with Beth Hart)	Provogue	30 March 2014	1	
Joe Bonamassa	20	11	47	Different Shades of Blue †	Provogue	28 September 2014	1	
Joe Bonamassa	20	11	47	Blues of Desperation †	Provogue	1 April 2016	4	
Joe Bonamassa	20	11	47	Live at the Greek Theatre	Provogue	30 September 2016	1	
Joe Bonamassa	20	11	47	Live at Carnegie Hall: An Acoustic Evening	Provogue	30 June 2017	3	
Joe Bonamassa	20	11	47	Black Coffee (with Beth Hart) †	Provogue	2 February 2018	6	
Joe Bonamassa	20	11	47	British Blues Explosion Live	Provogue	25 May 2018	1	
Joe Bonamassa	20	11	47	Redemption †	Provogue	28 September 2018	4	
Joe Bonamassa	20	11	47	A New Day Now	Provogue	14 August 2020	2	
Joe Bonamassa	20	11	47	Now Serving: Royal Tea Live from the Ryman	Provogue	18 June 2021	1	
Joe Bonamassa	20	11	47	Time Clocks	Provogue	5 November 2021	1	
Joe Bonamassa	20	11	47	Tales of Time	Provogue	21 April 2023	2	
Joe Bonamassa	20	11	47	Blues Deluxe Vol. 2	Provogue	13 October 2023	2	
Joe Bonamassa	20	11	47	Live at the Hollywood Bowl with Orchestra	Provogue	28 June 2024	1	
Seasick Steve	12	10	68	I Started Out with Nothin and I Still Got Most of It Left †	Warner Bros.	5 October 2008	27	
Seasick Steve	12	10	68	Man from Another Time †	Atlantic	25 October 2009	7	
Seasick Steve	12	10	68	Songs for Elisabeth	Atlantic	14 February 2010	4	
Seasick Steve	12	10	68	You Can't Teach an Old Dog New Tricks †	PIAS	5 June 2011	2	
Seasick Steve	12	10	68	Hubcap Music	Fiction	5 May 2013	1	
Seasick Steve	12	10	68	Walkin' Man: The Best of Seasick Steve	Rhino	3 November 2013	13	
Seasick Steve	12	10	68	Sonic Soul Surfer †	Caroline	29 March 2015	4	
Seasick Steve	12	10	68	Keepin' the Horse Between Me and the Ground †	Caroline	14 October 2016	4	
Seasick Steve	12	10	68	Can U Cook?	BMG	5 October 2018	2	
Seasick Steve	12	10	68	Love & Peace	Contagious	31 July 2020	2	
Seasick Steve	12	10	68	Only on Vinyl	Dead Skunk	30 September 2022	1	
Seasick Steve	12	10	68	A Trip a Stumble a Fall Down on Your Knees	SO	14 June 2024	1	
Diana Krall	9	9	32	When I Look in Your Eyes	Verve	6 June 1999	3	
Diana Krall	9	9	32	The Look of Love	Verve	23 September 2001	18	
Diana Krall	9	9	32	The Girl in the Other Room †	Verve	18 April 2004	1	
Diana Krall	9	9	32	From This Moment On	Verve	15 October 2006	2	
Diana Krall	9	9	32	Quiet Nights	Verve	7 June 2009	2	
Diana Krall	9	9	32	Glad Rag Doll	Verve	21 October 2012	1	
Diana Krall	9	9	32	Turn Up the Quiet	Verve	12 May 2017	3	
Diana Krall	9	9	32	Love Is Here to Stay (with Tony Bennett)	Columbia/Verve	21 September 2018	1	
Diana Krall	9	9	32	This Dream of You	UCJ	2 October 2020	1	
Gary Moore	8	3	14	Ballads & Blues 1982–1994	Virgin	20 November 1994	5	
Gary Moore	8	3	14	Blues for Greeny	Virgin	20 November 1994	3	
Gary Moore	8	3	14	Blues Alive †	Virgin	2 June 1996	1	
Gary Moore	8	3	14	Still Got the Blues	Virgin	9 June 1996	1	
Gary Moore	8	3	14	The Best of the Blues	Virgin	10 February 2002	1	
Gary Moore	8	3	14	Legacy	MCD	14 October 2012	1	
Gary Moore	8	3	14	Live from London	Provogue	21 February 2020	1	
Gary Moore	8	3	14	How Blue Can You Get	Provogue	7 May 2021	1	
Norah Jones	7	7	116	Come Away with Me †	Parlophone	10 March 2002	75	
Norah Jones	7	7	116	Feels Like Home †	Blue Note	15 February 2004	25	
Norah Jones	7	7	116	Not Too Late †	Blue Note	4 February 2007	7	
Norah Jones	7	7	116	The Fall	Blue Note	22 November 2009	3	
Norah Jones	7	7	116	Day Breaks †	Capitol	11 November 2016	3	
Norah Jones	7	7	116	Pick Me Up Off the Floor	EMI	19 June 2020	2	
Norah Jones	7	7	116	Visions	EMI	15 March 2024	1	
Eric Clapton	7	4	52	From the Cradle	Duck	18 September 1994	7	
Eric Clapton	7	4	52	Blues	Polydor	20 June 1999	4	
Eric Clapton	7	4	52	Riding with the King	Reprise	18 June 2000	34	
Eric Clapton	7	4	52	I Still Do	Polydor	27 May 2016	1	
Eric Clapton	7	4	52	Nothing but the Blues	WEA	1 July 2022	3	
Eric Clapton	7	4	52	To Save a Child: An Intimate Live Concert	Surfdog	19 July 2024	1	
Eric Clapton	7	4	52	Meanwhile	Surfdog	31 January 2025	1	
Walter Trout	7	7	9	Blues for the Modern Daze	Provogue	29 April 2012	1	
Walter Trout	7	7	9	Battle Scars	Provogue	30 October 2015	1	
Walter Trout	7	7	9	We're All in This Together	Provogue	8 September 2017	2	
Walter Trout	7	7	9	Survivor Blues	Provogue	1 February 2019	2	
Walter Trout	7	7	9	Ordinary Madness	Provogue	4 September 2020	1	
Walter Trout	7	7	9	Ride	Provogue	26 August 2022	1	
Walter Trout	7	7	9	Broken	Provogue	8 March 2024	1	
Rory Gallagher	6	1	22	Big Guns: The Very Best of Rory Gallagher	Capo	19 June 2005	4	
Rory Gallagher	6	1	22	Irish Tour '74	UMC	23 March 2018	1	
Rory Gallagher	6	1	22	Blues	UMC	7 June 2019	12	
Rory Gallagher	6	1	22	Check Shirt Wizard: Live in '77	UMC	13 March 2020	3	
Rory Gallagher	6	1	22	Rory Gallagher	UMC	10 September 2021	1	
Rory Gallagher	6	1	22	All Around Man: Live in London	UMC	14 July 2023	1	
Joanne Shaw Taylor	6	5	8	Almost Always Never	Ruf	23 September 2012	1	
Joanne Shaw Taylor	6	5	8	Wild	Axehouse	7 October 2016	1	
Joanne Shaw Taylor	6	5	8	Reckless Heart	Silvertone	22 March 2019	3	
Joanne Shaw Taylor	6	5	8	The Blues Album	KTBA	1 October 2021	1	
Joanne Shaw Taylor	6	5	8	Blues from the Heart Live	KTBA	17 June 2022	1	
Joanne Shaw Taylor	6	5	8	Nobody's Fool	KTBA	18 November 2022	1	

== See also ==
- Lists of UK Jazz & Blues Albums Chart number ones
