= List of UK Jazz & Blues Albums Chart number ones of 2009 =

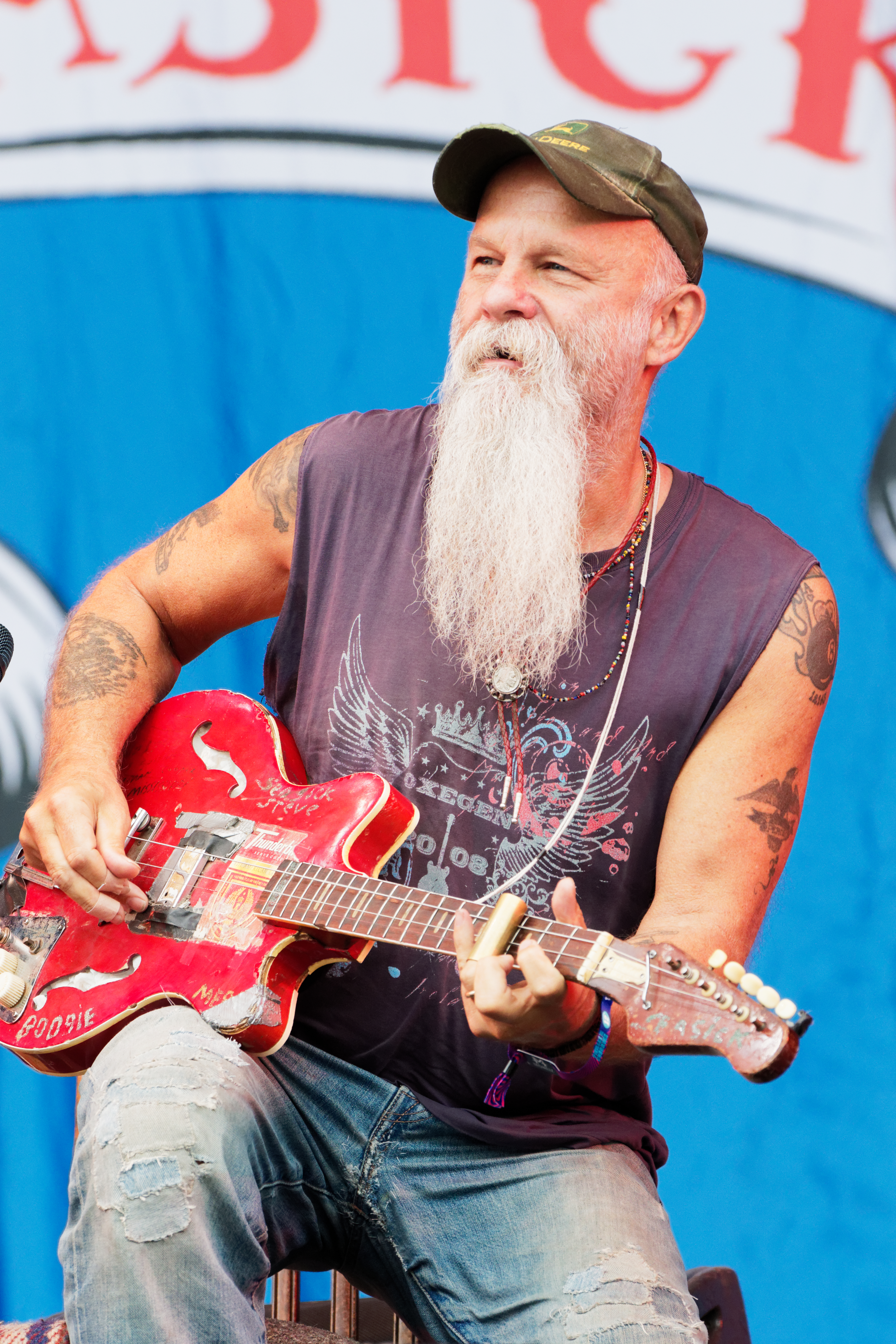
Seasick Steve spent a total of 16 weeks in 2009 at number one on the UK Jazz & Blues Albums Chart – 13 weeks with debut I Started Out with Nothin and I Still Got Most of It Left and three with its follow-up Man from Another Time.

The UK Jazz & Blues Albums Chart is a record chart which ranks the best-selling jazz and blues albums in the United Kingdom. Compiled and published by the Official Charts Company, the data is based on each album's weekly physical sales, digital downloads and streams. In 2009, 52 charts were published with 12 albums at number one. The first number-one album of the year was Seasick Steve's major label debut I Started Out with Nothin and I Still Got Most of It Left, which spent the first 11 weeks of the year atop the chart to complete a 24-week run starting the year before. The last number-one album of the year was Michael Bublé's fifth studio album Call Me Irresponsible.

The most successful album on the UK Jazz & Blues Albums Chart in 2009 was I Started Out with Nothin and I Still Got Most of It Left, which spent a total of 13 weeks at number one. Seasick Steve's follow-up release, Man from Another Time, spent three weeks at the top of the chart. Kind of Blue by Miles Davis returned to the number one spot for the first time since 2001, spending a total of eight consecutive weeks atop the chart. My One and Only Thrill by Melody Gardot and Bare Bones Madeleine Peyroux each spent five weeks at number one during 2009. I Started Out with Nothin and I Still Got Most of It Left finished 2009 as the 92nd best-selling album of the year in the UK.

== Chart history ==
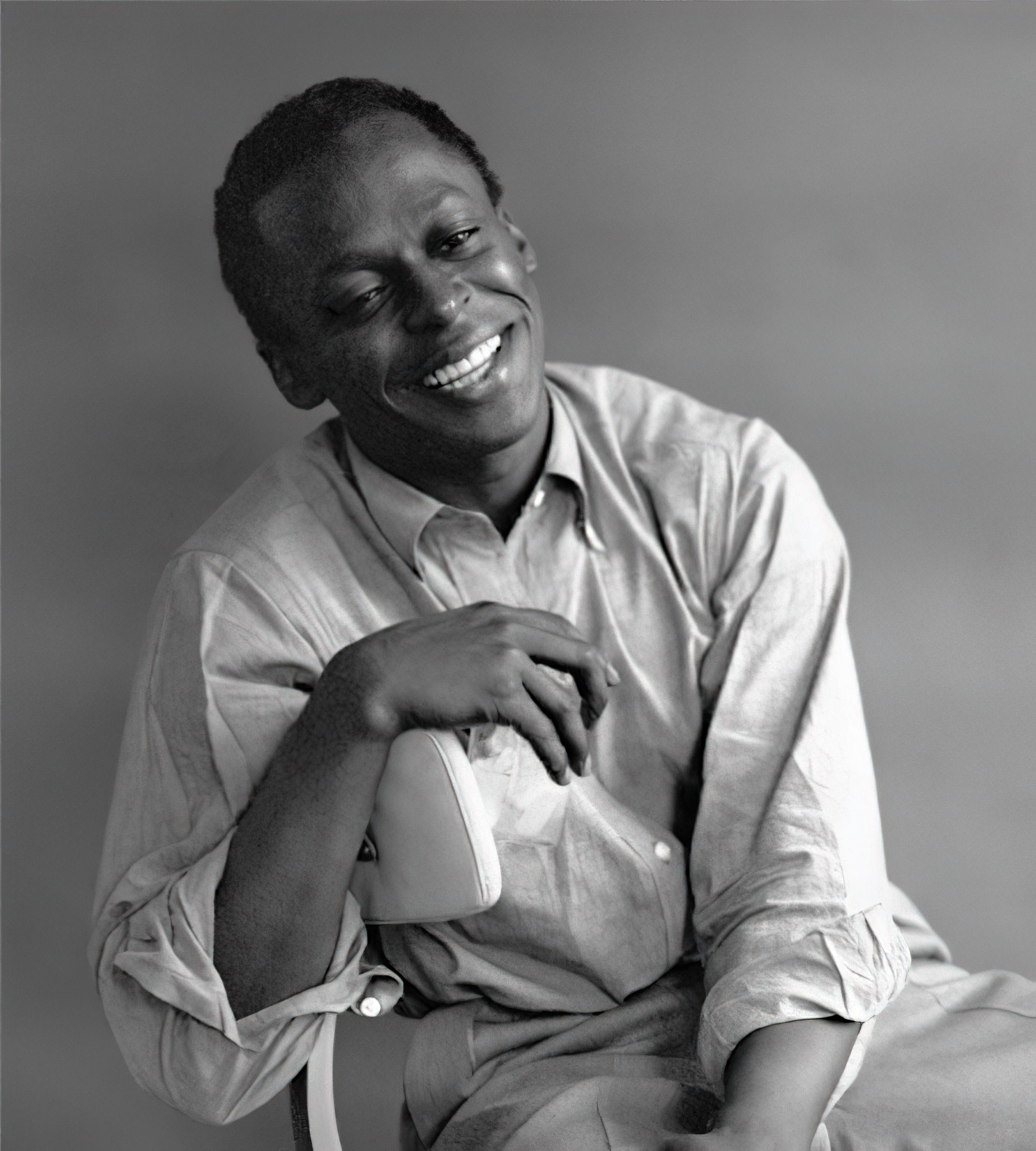
Kind of Blue by Miles Davis returned to number one for eight consecutive weeks in the summer of 2009.

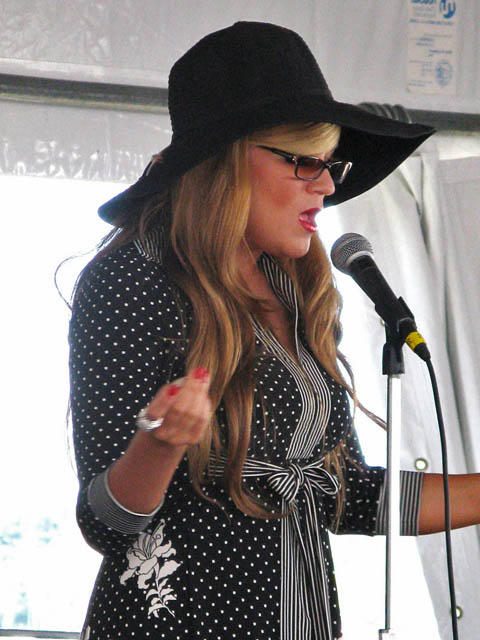
Melody Gardot's second album My One and Only Thrill spent five weeks at number one over two spells in 2009.

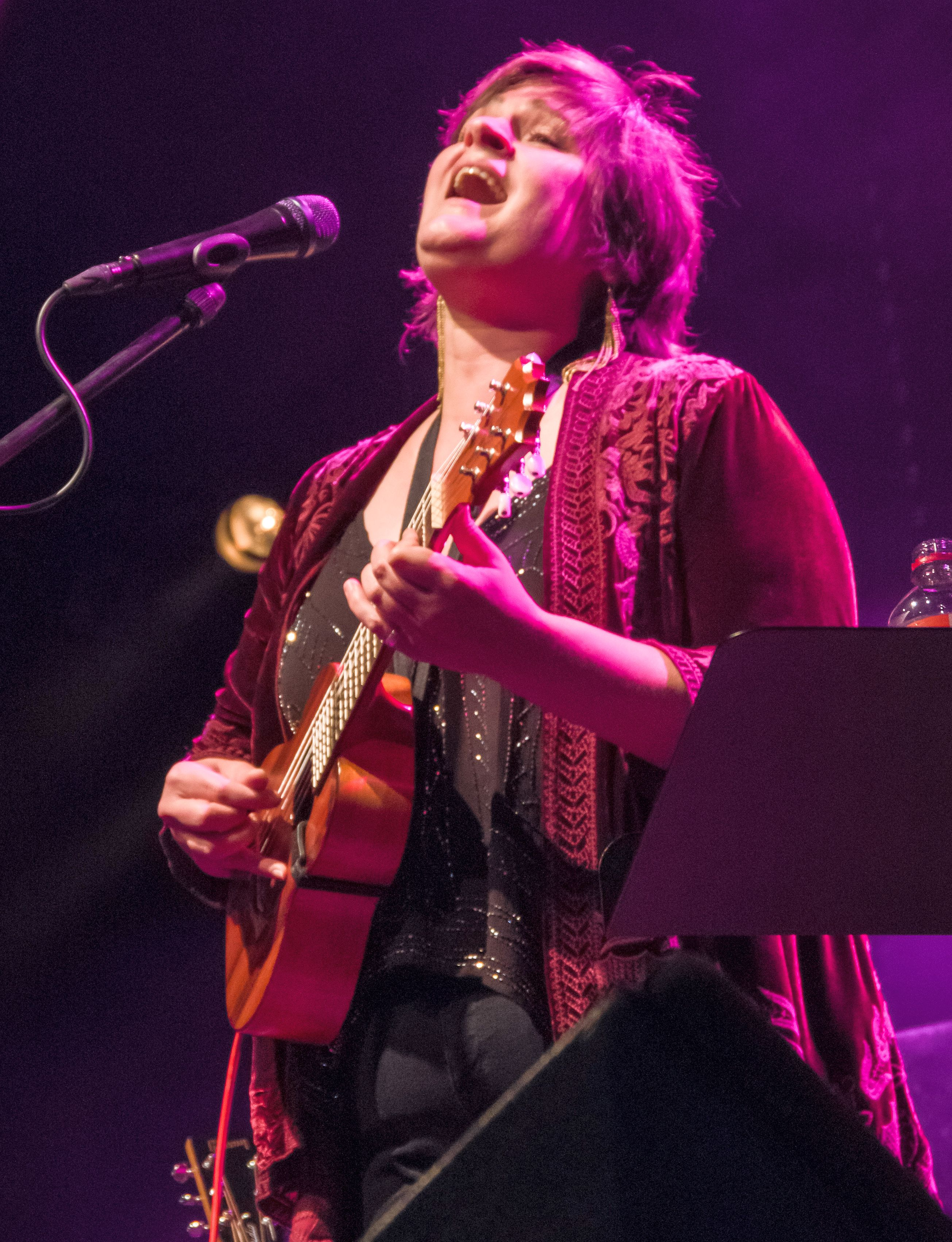
Madeleine Peyroux also spent five weeks at number one in 2009, with her tenth studio album Bare Bones.

Key
†	Indicates best-selling jazz/blues album of 2009

Issue date	Album	Artist(s)	Record label(s)	Ref.
4 January	I Started Out with Nothin and I Still Got Most of It Left †	Seasick Steve	Warner Bros.	
11 January	I Started Out with Nothin and I Still Got Most of It Left †	Seasick Steve	Warner Bros.	
18 January	I Started Out with Nothin and I Still Got Most of It Left †	Seasick Steve	Warner Bros.	
25 January	I Started Out with Nothin and I Still Got Most of It Left †	Seasick Steve	Warner Bros.	
1 February	I Started Out with Nothin and I Still Got Most of It Left †	Seasick Steve	Warner Bros.	
8 February	I Started Out with Nothin and I Still Got Most of It Left †	Seasick Steve	Warner Bros.	
15 February	I Started Out with Nothin and I Still Got Most of It Left †	Seasick Steve	Warner Bros.	
22 February	I Started Out with Nothin and I Still Got Most of It Left †	Seasick Steve	Warner Bros.	
1 March	I Started Out with Nothin and I Still Got Most of It Left †	Seasick Steve	Warner Bros.	
8 March	I Started Out with Nothin and I Still Got Most of It Left †	Seasick Steve	Warner Bros.	
15 March	I Started Out with Nothin and I Still Got Most of It Left †	Seasick Steve	Warner Bros.	
22 March	My One and Only Thrill	Melody Gardot	UCJ	
29 March	My One and Only Thrill	Melody Gardot	UCJ	
5 April	My One and Only Thrill	Melody Gardot	UCJ	
12 April	I Started Out with Nothin and I Still Got Most of It Left †	Seasick Steve	Warner Bros.	
19 April	Bare Bones	Madeleine Peyroux	Decca/Rounder	
26 April	Bare Bones	Madeleine Peyroux	Decca/Rounder	
3 May	Bare Bones	Madeleine Peyroux	Decca/Rounder	
10 May	Bare Bones	Madeleine Peyroux	Decca/Rounder	
17 May	Bare Bones	Madeleine Peyroux	Decca/Rounder	
24 May	My One and Only Thrill	Melody Gardot	UCJ	
31 May	My One and Only Thrill	Melody Gardot	UCJ	
7 June	Quiet Nights	Diana Krall	Verve	
14 June	Quiet Nights	Diana Krall	Verve	
21 June	Ultimate Blues	various artists	Decca	
28 June	Ultimate Blues	various artists	Decca	
5 July	Ultimate Blues	various artists	Decca	
12 July	Ultimate Blues	various artists	Decca	
19 July	Ultimate Blues	various artists	Decca	
26 July	Boaters, Bowlers & Bowties: The Best of Barber, Ball & Bilk	Chris Barber, Kenny Ball, Acker Bilk	Decca	
2 August	Boaters, Bowlers & Bowties: The Best of Barber, Ball & Bilk	Chris Barber, Kenny Ball, Acker Bilk	Decca	
9 August	Boaters, Bowlers & Bowties: The Best of Barber, Ball & Bilk	Chris Barber, Kenny Ball, Acker Bilk	Decca	
16 August	Kind of Blue	Miles Davis	Columbia	
23 August	Kind of Blue	Miles Davis	Columbia	
30 August	Kind of Blue	Miles Davis	Columbia	
6 September	Kind of Blue	Miles Davis	Columbia	
13 September	Kind of Blue	Miles Davis	Columbia	
20 September	Kind of Blue	Miles Davis	Columbia	
27 September	Kind of Blue	Miles Davis	Columbia	
4 October	Kind of Blue	Miles Davis	Columbia	
11 October	It's Time	Michael Bublé	Reprise	
18 October	I Started Out with Nothin and I Still Got Most of It Left †	Seasick Steve	Warner Bros.	
25 October	Man from Another Time	Seasick Steve	Atlantic	
1 November		Seasick Steve	Atlantic	
8 November		Seasick Steve	Atlantic	
15 November	The Pursuit	Jamie Cullum	Decca	
22 November	The Fall	Norah Jones	Blue Note	
29 November	The Fall	Norah Jones	Blue Note	
6 December	The Pursuit	Jamie Cullum	Decca	
13 December	The Fall	Norah Jones	Blue Note	
20 December	Call Me Irresponsible	Michael Bublé	Reprise	
27 December	Call Me Irresponsible	Michael Bublé	Reprise	

== See also ==
- 2009 in British music
