= List of UK Jazz & Blues Albums Chart number ones of 2010 =

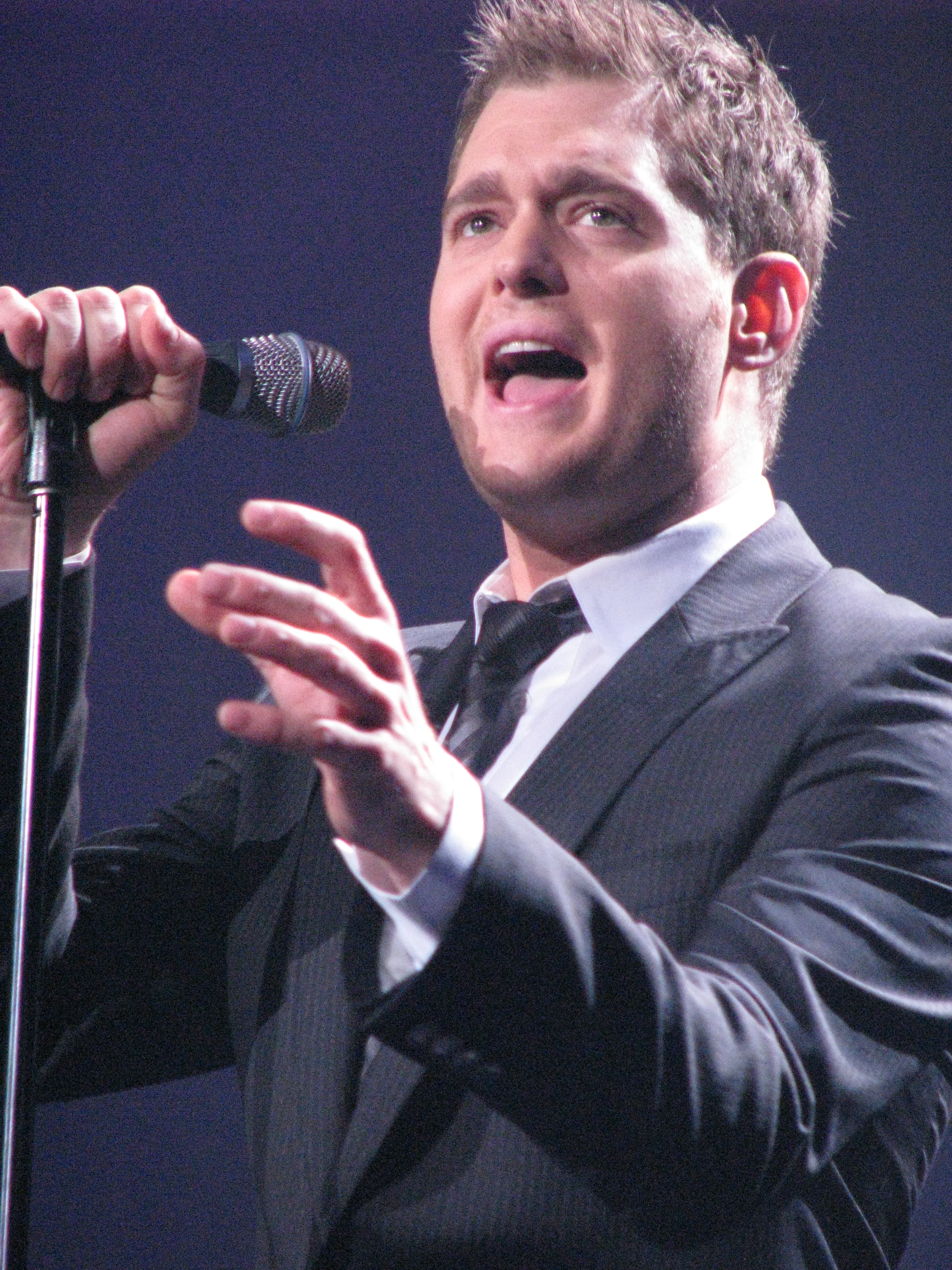
Michael Bublé spent 28 weeks at the UK Jazz & Blues Albums Chart number one in 2010 with Call Me Irresponsible.

The UK Jazz & Blues Albums Chart is a record chart which ranks the best-selling jazz and blues albums in the United Kingdom. Compiled and published by the Official Charts Company, the data is based on each album's weekly physical sales, digital downloads and streams. In 2010, 52 charts were published with ten albums at number one. The first number-one album of the year was Michael Bublé's fifth studio album Call Me Irresponsible, spending its 49th week overall at number one. The last number-one album of the year was Seasons of My Soul, the debut album by singer-songwriter Rumer, which spent the last eight weeks of the year atop the chart.

The most successful album on the UK Jazz & Blues Albums Chart in 2010 was Call Me Irresponsible, which spent a total of 28 weeks at number one over the course of six separate spells (including ten- and nine-week runs). Seasons of My Soul was the second most successful album of the year with eight weeks at number one, although Seasick Steve spent a total of nine weeks at number one with three different albums: I Started Out with Nothin and I Still Got Most of It Left (one week), Man from Another Time (four weeks), and Songs for Elisabeth (four weeks). Seasons of My Soul finished 2010 as the 36th best-selling album of the year in the UK.

== Chart history ==
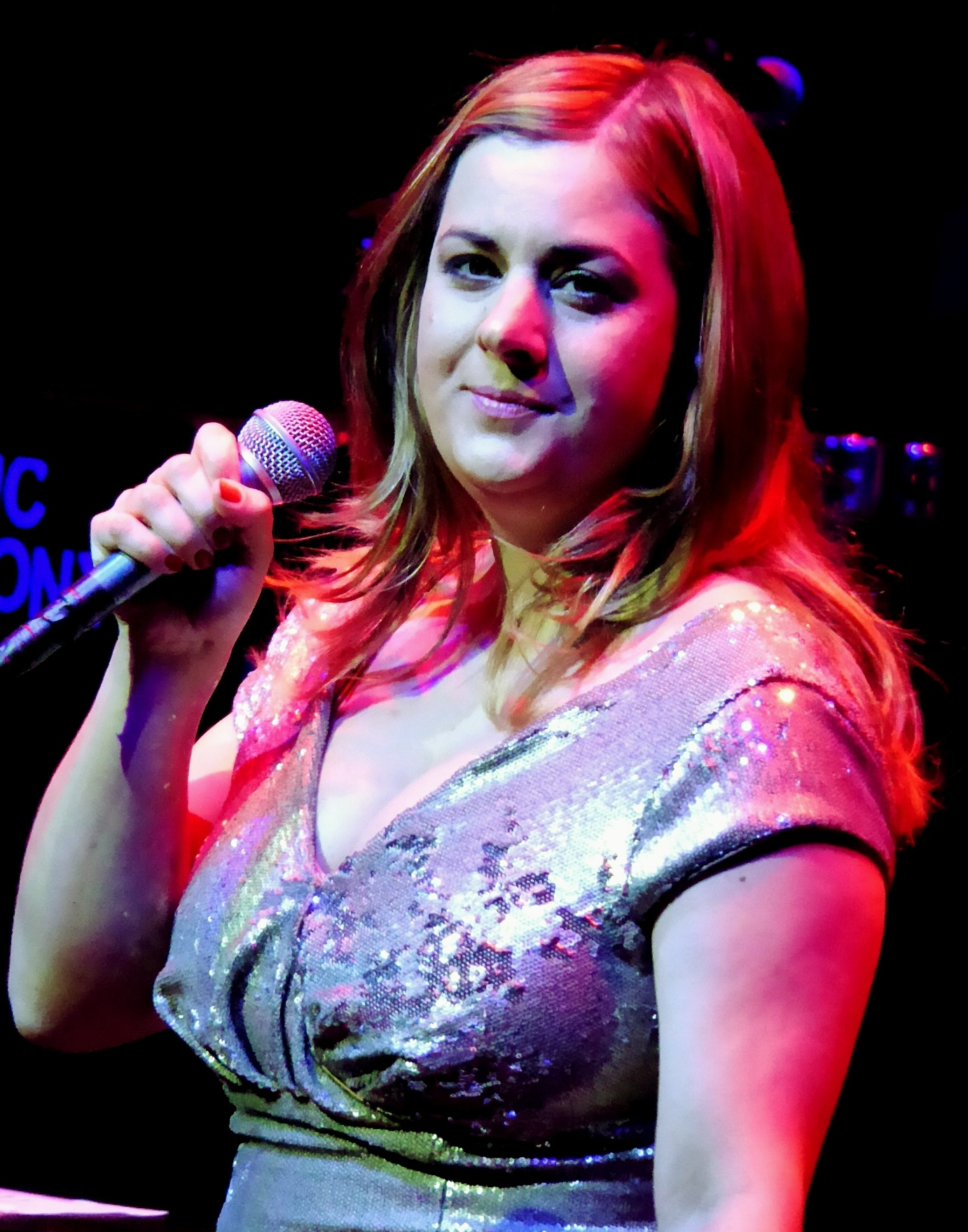
Rumer spent the last eight weeks of the year at number one with her debut album, Seasons of My Soul.

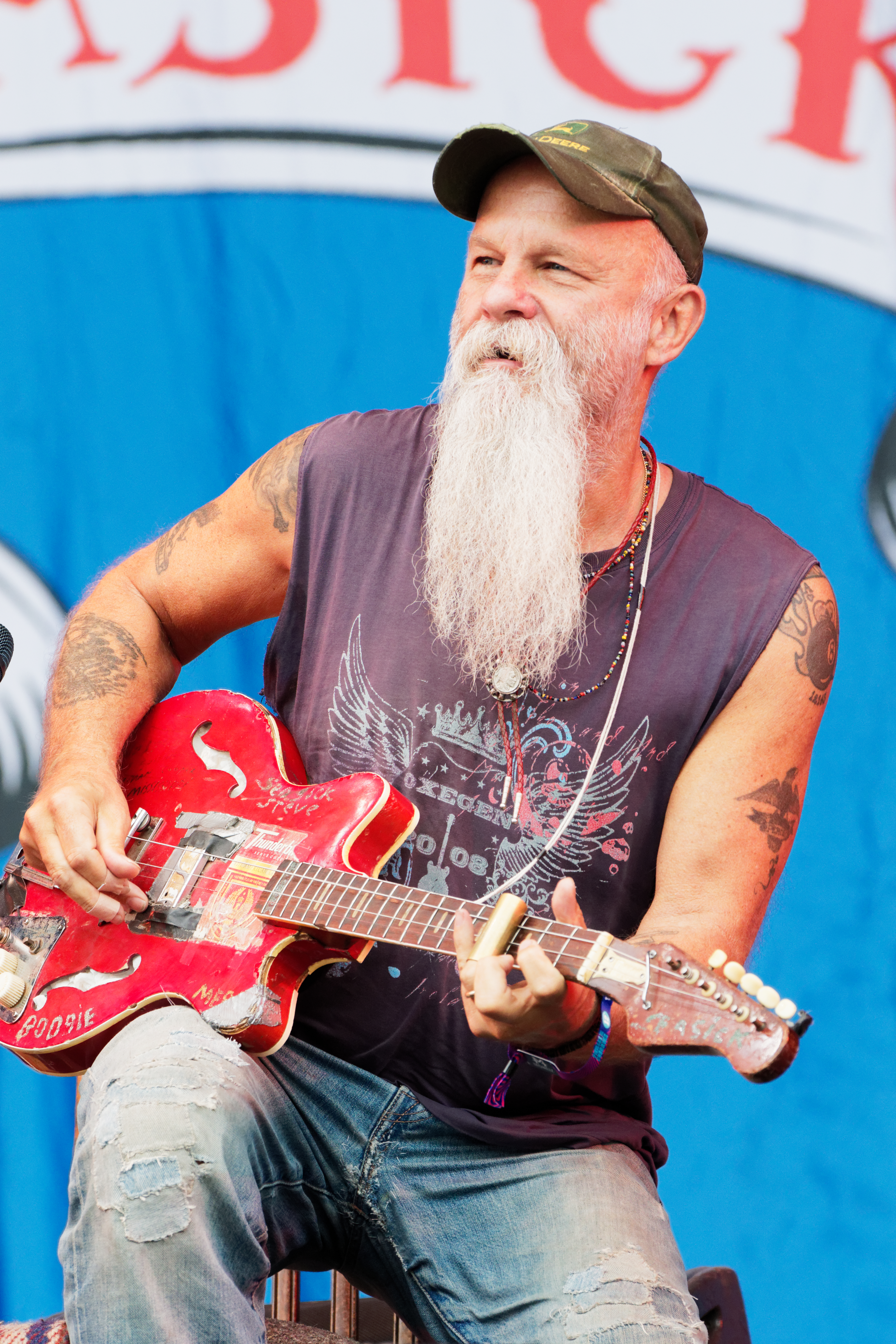
Seasick Steve had three UK Jazz & Blues Albums Chart number-one albums in 2010 – I Started Out with Nothin and I Still Got Most of It Left, Man from Another Time and Songs for Elisabeth – which spent a combined nine weeks atop the chart.

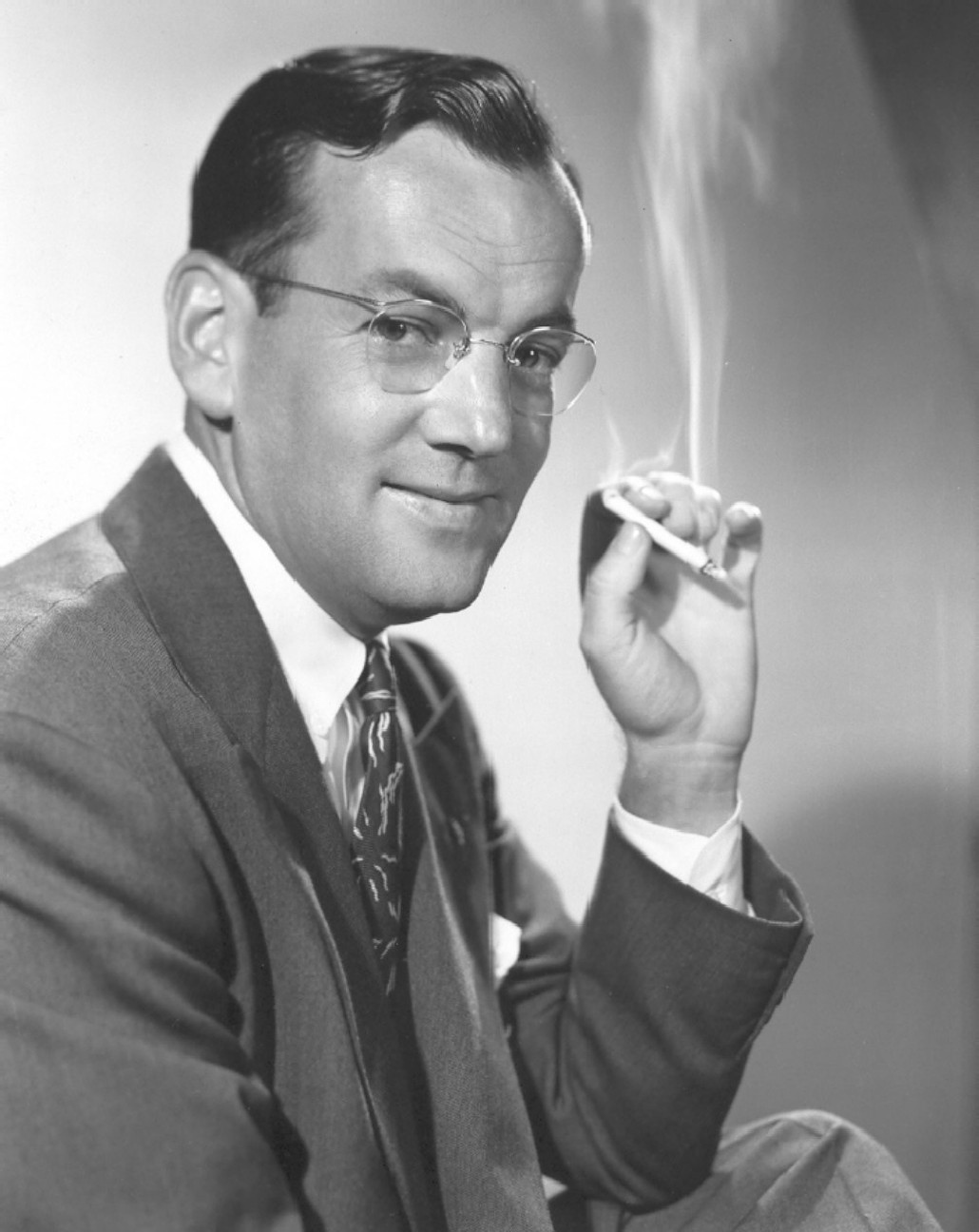
The Glenn Miller compilation The Very Best of Glenn Miller spent five weeks at number one during June and July 2010.

Key
†	Indicates best-selling jazz/blues album of 2010

Issue date	Album	Artist(s)	Record label(s)	Ref.
3 January	Call Me Irresponsible	Michael Bublé	Reprise	
10 January	I Started Out with Nothin and I Still Got Most of It Left	Seasick Steve	Warner Bros.	
17 January	Man from Another Time	Seasick Steve	Atlantic	
24 January	Man from Another Time	Seasick Steve	Atlantic	
31 January	Man from Another Time	Seasick Steve	Atlantic	
7 February	Call Me Irresponsible	Michael Bublé	Reprise	
14 February	Songs for Elisabeth	Seasick Steve	Atlantic	
21 February	Songs for Elisabeth	Seasick Steve	Atlantic	
28 February	Songs for Elisabeth	Seasick Steve	Atlantic	
7 March	Songs for Elisabeth	Seasick Steve	Atlantic	
14 March	Call Me Irresponsible	Michael Bublé	Reprise	
21 March	Call Me Irresponsible	Michael Bublé	Reprise	
28 March	Black Rock	Joe Bonamassa	Provogue	
4 April	Call Me Irresponsible	Michael Bublé	Reprise	
11 April	Call Me Irresponsible	Michael Bublé	Reprise	
18 April	Call Me Irresponsible	Michael Bublé	Reprise	
25 April	Call Me Irresponsible	Michael Bublé	Reprise	
2 May	Call Me Irresponsible	Michael Bublé	Reprise	
9 May	Call Me Irresponsible	Michael Bublé	Reprise	
16 May	Call Me Irresponsible	Michael Bublé	Reprise	
23 May	Call Me Irresponsible	Michael Bublé	Reprise	
30 May	Call Me Irresponsible	Michael Bublé	Reprise	
6 June	In the Mood	RAF Squadronaires	Decca	
13 June	In the Mood	RAF Squadronaires	Decca	
20 June	The Very Best of Glenn Miller	Glenn Miller	Sony	
27 June	In the Mood	RAF Squadronaires	Decca	
4 July	The Very Best of Glenn Miller	Glenn Miller	Sony	
11 July	The Very Best of Glenn Miller	Glenn Miller	Sony	
18 July	The Very Best of Glenn Miller	Glenn Miller	Sony	
25 July	The Very Best of Glenn Miller	Glenn Miller	Sony	
1 August	Call Me Irresponsible	Michael Bublé	Reprise	
8 August	Call Me Irresponsible	Michael Bublé	Reprise	
15 August	Call Me Irresponsible	Michael Bublé	Reprise	
22 August	Call Me Irresponsible	Michael Bublé	Reprise	
29 August	Call Me Irresponsible	Michael Bublé	Reprise	
5 September	Call Me Irresponsible	Michael Bublé	Reprise	
12 September	Call Me Irresponsible	Michael Bublé	Reprise	
19 September	Call Me Irresponsible	Michael Bublé	Reprise	
26 September	Call Me Irresponsible	Michael Bublé	Reprise	
3 October	Call Me Irresponsible	Michael Bublé	Reprise	
10 October	Man from Another Time	Seasick Steve	Atlantic	
17 October	Call Me Irresponsible	Michael Bublé	Reprise	
24 October	Deleted Scenes from the Cutting Room Floor	Caro Emerald	Dramatico	
31 October	The Union	Elton John, Leon Russell	Mercury	
7 November	Seasons of My Soul †	Rumer	Atlantic	
14 November	Seasons of My Soul †	Rumer	Atlantic	
21 November	Seasons of My Soul †	Rumer	Atlantic	
28 November	Seasons of My Soul †	Rumer	Atlantic	
5 December	Seasons of My Soul †	Rumer	Atlantic	
12 December	Seasons of My Soul †	Rumer	Atlantic	
19 December	Seasons of My Soul †	Rumer	Atlantic	
26 December	Seasons of My Soul †	Rumer	Atlantic	

== See also ==
- 2010 in British music
