= Cheap =

Cheap may refer to:

- Cheapness
- Cheap (album), debut album from Seasick Steve
- Cheap (ward), London, UK
- Flatwoods, Kentucky, previously known as Cheap

== See also ==
- Cheapskate
- Cheep (disambiguation)
- Miser
