= Cheep =

Cheep may refer to:

- Bird vocalization
- Cheep, a 1917 musical revue at the Vaudeville Theatre
- CH-33P, an astromech droid in the final season of Star Wars: The Clone Wars
- Cheep Cheep, fish enemy from the Super Mario franchise

== See also ==
- Cheap (disambiguation)
