= Sonic Soul Surfer =

Studio album by Seasick Steve
- Released: March 23, 2015
- Genre: Rock, blues
- Label: Caroline International, Bronze Rat Records
- Producer: Seasick Steve

Seasick Steve chronology
Hubcap Music (2013)	Sonic Soul Surfer (2015)	Keepin' the Horse Between Me and the Ground (2016)

Singles from Sonic Soul Surfer
- 1. "Bring It On" Released: 25 November 2014; 2. "Summertime Boy" Released: 10 February 2015; 3. "Roy's Gang" Released: 12 April 2015; 4. "Barracuda '68" Released: 6 June 2015

Sonic Soul Surfer is the seventh studio album by American blues musician Seasick Steve. It is the follow-up of his previous album Hubcap Music in 2013. It was released on 23 March 2015 worldwide. Three singles were released from the album: "Bring It On" was the lead single on 25 November 2014, "Summertime Boy" was the album's second single on 10 February 2015, and music video was shot, featuring Seasick Steve surfing. Another single and music video were released on 12 April 2015: the album's opening track "Roy's Gang". A "Sonic Soul Tour" started in April 2015, with concerts in the US, and across Europe.

The album was his most acclaimed to date by critics, with an average score of 70/100 according to Metacritic. It also was a commercial success, peaking at number 4 on the UK and Scottish Albums Chart, 16 in the Netherlands, 17 in Belgium, 25 in Ireland, and 64 in Australia, its best peak since his 2009 album Man From Another Time. It has been certified silver.

== Critical reception ==
Professional ratings
Review scores
Source	Rating
Metacritic	70/100
Exclaim!	7/10
Mojo	4/5 stars
Amazon	4.5/5 stars
MusicOMH	3.5/5 stars
AllMusic	3.5/5 stars

Sonic Soul Surfer received critical acclaim, receiving an average score of 70/100 on Metacritic, based on nine critics.

Mojo gave the album four out of five stars, stating "Sonic Soul Surfer mostly trades in toe-tapping slide-guitar riffage". Q magazine also rewarded the album with four out of five stars. The website "The Metropolist" rewarded the album with three out of five stars, picking lead single "Bring It On" as a "stand-out", but criticizing "Roy's Gang" as "falling a bit flat".

Calum Slingerland of Exclaim! acknowledged that the record was more about lateral movement as opposed to breaking new musical ground, writing that Sonic Soul Surfer "reassures listeners that the California native's desire to write and play is still very much alive."

French website Stillinrock also gave a positive review of the record, but however criticized it in these words : "it's a fact : Sonic Soul Surfer won't be a rock'n'roll revolution. However, only a few musicians dare playing this kind of music [...]. If "powerful" is the word that comes to our mind when we think of Sonic Soul Surfer, it might be because Steve is an artist that lies neither to himself nor to his audience".

== Track listing ==
No.	Title	Length
1.	"Roy's Gang"	6:07
2.	"Bring It On"	3:46
3.	"Dog Gonna Play"	5:17
4.	"In Peaceful Dreams"	2:43
5.	"Summertime Boy"	3:55
6.	"Swamp Dog"	4:52
7.	"Sonic Soul Boogie"	5:21
8.	"Right On Time"	3:21
9.	"Barracuda '68"	4:21
10.	"We Be Moving"	5:21
11.	"Your Name"	6:58
12.	"Heart Full of Scars"	4:06

Deluxe Edition bonus tracks
No.	Title	Length
13.	"Don't Ask Me"	7:29
14.	"Baby Please Don't Go"	4:12
15.	"Man's Best Friend"	3:41
16.	"Silver Dagger"	2:40

== Charts and certifications ==
=== Weekly charts ===
Chart (2015)	Peak position
Australian Albums (ARIA)	64
Belgian Albums (Ultratop Flanders)	17
Belgian Albums (Ultratop Wallonia)	43
Dutch Albums (Album Top 100)	16
French Albums (SNEP)	64
German Albums (Offizielle Top 100)	87
Irish Albums (IRMA)	25
Scottish Albums (OCC)	4
Swiss Albums (Schweizer Hitparade)	72
UK Albums (OCC)	4
US Top Blues Albums (Billboard)	5

=== Year-end charts ===
Chart (2015)	Position
Belgian Albums (Ultratop Flanders)	183

=== Certifications ===
Region	Certification	Certified units/sales
United Kingdom (BPI)	Silver	60,000^{‡}
^{‡} Sales+streaming figures based on certification alone.
