= Shanti (band) =

World music band

- Origin: San Francisco, California, U.S.
- Genres: Raga rock, world music
- Years active: 1970–1972
- Label: Atlantic
- Past members: Zakir Hussain; Aashish Khan; Pranesh Khan; Neil Seidel; Steve Haehl; Steve Leach; Frank Lupica

Shanti was a world music band who played a fusion of Indian and rock music in the United States in the early 1970s.

The band formed in the San Francisco area in about 1970, as a collaboration between classical Indian musicians Zakir Hussain (tabla, dholak, naal), Aashish Khan (sarod), and Pranesh Khan (tabla, naal); and American rock and jazz musicians Neil Seidel (lead guitar), Steve Haehl (lead vocals, guitar), Steve Leach (bass), and Frank Lupica (drums). The stated intention at the time, according to Seidel, was to highlight the beauty of Indian music by showing it in a rock context. The word "Shanti" is a Sanskrit term meaning "inner peace", and, again according to Seidel, all the band members were adherents of Transcendental Meditation.

Produced by Richard Bock, the band's self-titled album was recorded in San Francisco and was released by Atlantic Records in 1971. The album includes both psychedelic rock songs on which "the Indian instrumentation is minimized and largely reduced to decoration", and mostly longer tracks "that integrate Western and Eastern sounds in a more cohesive manner".

The group was dropped by Atlantic after one album. They auditioned for Apple Records, but Ravi Shankar reportedly persuaded George Harrison not to sign them, and the band then split up. Zakir Hussain and Aashish Khan both maintained successful careers, with Hussain collaborating with both John McLaughlin and Mickey Hart on later projects. Bassist Steve Leach, later known as Steve Wold, re-emerged as a performer in the 2000s as Seasick Steve.

The band's only album, Shanti, was reissued on CD in 2015.
