= Miraculous Mule =

English rock band

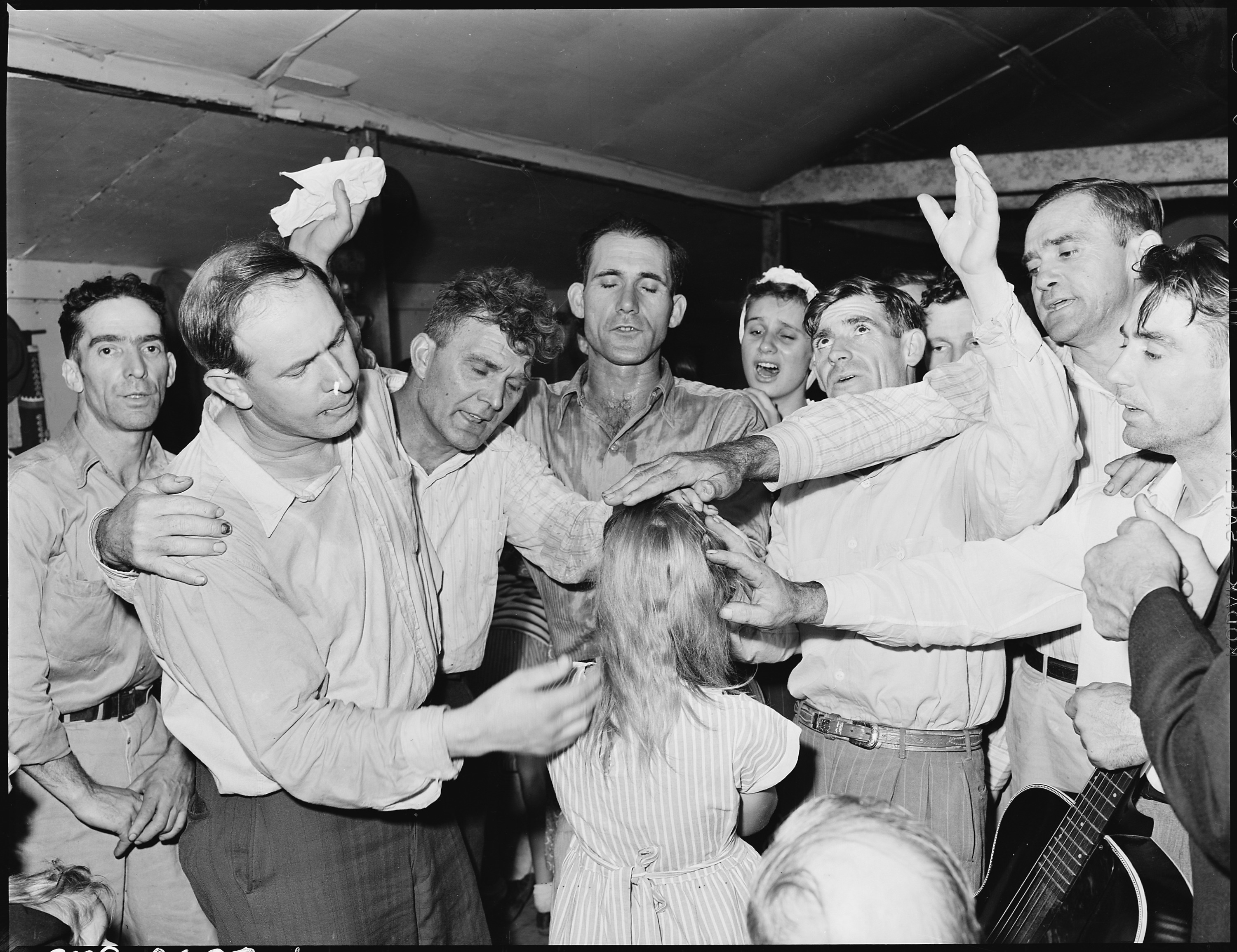
- The picture used for Deep Fried LP's cover

Background information
- Origin: England
- Genres: Electric blues, Alternative rock, indie rock
- Years active: 2011 until now
- Labels: Stag-O-Lee, Bronze Rat Records
- Members: Ian Burns; Patrick McCarthy; Michael J. Sheehy
- Website: miraculousmule.com

Miraculous Mule are an English rock band, active from 2011 until now. The band includes the drummer Ian Burns, Patrick McCarthy, who plays bass and sings, and his brother the singer, songwriter and guitarist Michael J. Sheehy, a former member of the Dream City Film Club, the Hired Mourners and Saint Silas Intercession.

In 2011, Miraculous Mule was released - a six songs record on Stag-O-Lee.

Its second record, Deep Fried, was released in autumn 2013 at Bronze Rat Records, containing ten titles and including the song "Satisfied". The picture used for its cover came from Wikimedia Commons : it was taken in 1946 by Russell Lee during a religious ceremony in Kentucky.

Miraculous Mule plays on Höfner basses and guitars.

In February and March 2014, the band went on tour in western continental Europe (France, Belgium, Netherlands, Germany, Switzerland).

== Discography ==
- Miraculous Mule EP (Stag-o-Lee, 2011)
- Deep Fried (Bronze Rat, 2013)
- Blues Uzi (Bronze Rat, 2014)
- Two Tonne Testimony (2017)
