= Can U Cook? =

Studio album by Seasick Steve
- Released: 28 September 2018
- Studio: RAK Studios, London, Royal Studios, Memphis, TN, Shrimp Boat Studios, Key West, FL, Sputnik Sound, Nashville, TN
- Genre: Blues rock; blues
- Length: 55.33
- Label: BMG
- Producer: Seasick Steve

Seasick Steve chronology
Keepin' the Horse Between Me and the Ground (2016)	Can U Cook? (2018)	Love & Peace (2020)

Can U Cook? is the ninth studio album by American bluesman Seasick Steve.

It was released on the 28 September 2018, and peaked at 27 on the UK Albums Chart.

== Background ==
Seasick Steve announced his ninth album after playing at a gig at Hyde Park on the 6 July 2018.

The album was recorded predominantly in a converted ice house in Key West.

"The Last Rodeo" was released as a first single from the album.

== Track listing ==
No.	Title	Length
1.	"Hate Da Winter"	4:38
2.	"Sun on My Face"	4.06
3.	"Can U Cook?"	3.26
4.	"Last Rodeo"	4.15
5.	"Down De Road"	4.47
6.	"Chewin' On Da Blues"	3.58
7.	"Shady Tree"	5:13
8.	"Lay"	2:50
9.	"Locked Up And Locked Down Blues"	4:10
10.	"Young Blood"	4:10
11.	"Get my Drift"	4.46
12.	"Ain't Nothin' But A Thang"	4:45
13.	"Company"	5:16

== Credits ==
- Artwork [Album Artwork], Layout – Tony Berg (2), Åmåls Grafiska AB
- Backing Vocals [Background Vocal] – Brother Jan Paternoster* (tracks: 7)
- Beats [Beat] – Brother Ed Sheeran* (tracks: 8), Brother Joe Rubel*
- Crew [Shrimp Boat Crew] – Chef Rick, J.L. Jamison, Rick Humes, Ross Alexander (4)
- Directed By [Direction] – Luther Dickinson (tracks: 11)
- Drums, Percussion – Dan Magnusson
- Engineer – Boo Mitchell (tracks: 11)
- Harmonica – Brother Mickey Raphael* (tracks: 3, 7)
- Harmonica [Harp] – Brother Cory Younts* (tracks: 4)
- Lead Guitar, Bass, Washtub Bass [Washboard Bass], Guitar [Cigar Box Stuff] – Luther Dickinson
- Mastered By – Pete Lyman
- Mixed By [Assisted By] – Mike Fahey (2)
- Organ – Brother Rev Charles Hodges* (tracks: 11)
- Performer [Assorted String Things And Hollerin'] – Seasick Steve
- Photography By [Cover Photo], Photography By [Liner Photos] – Dan Magnusson
- Piano – Brother Cory Younts* (tracks: 7)
- Producer [Produced By] – Seasick Steve
- Recorded By – Joe Rubel (tracks: 3)
- Recorded By [Additional Recording By] – Vance Powell (tracks: 3)
- Recorded By [Assistant] – Dan Ewins (tracks: 3), Nat Graham* (tracks: 3)
- Recorded By, Mixed By – Vance Powell
- Songwriter [All Songs Written By] – Steve Wold
- Synthesizer [Moog Bass] – Brother Adam Double* (tracks: 3)
