= Dog House Music =

Studio album by Seasick Steve
- Released: November 27, 2006
- Genre: Blues
- Length: 54:19
- Label: Bronzerat

Seasick Steve chronology
Cheap (2004)	Dog House Music (2006)	I Started Out with Nothin and I Still Got Most of It Left (2008)

Professional ratings
Review scores
Source	Rating
AllMusic	4/5 stars

Dog House Music is the second album by Seasick Steve, and his first as a solo artist. It was released on 27 November 2006; however, pre-release CDs were available for sale to members of his site's mailing list.

The album is almost entirely performed by Seasick Steve, apart from snare drum on "Yellow Dog" and crash cymbal on "Fallen Off a Rock", performed by H.J. Wold (a relation of Steve, whose real name is Steve Wold), and drums on the hidden track by Steve's son P.M. Wold.

The album reached number 36 in the UK Albums Chart, number 1 in the independent album charts, and number 7 in the downloads chart, all from sales in the UK.

== Hidden track ==
As on his first album, Cheap, there is a hidden track. Seven seconds after the end of the last listed track, "I'm Gone", Seasick Steve tells a story (despite complaints about his storytelling on Cheap). He talks about a faithful dog named Trixie that he once owned. One time he was arrested, and on his release, his dog was waiting for him 60 miles away from where he left her six months earlier. The dog then had 12 puppies, which she cared for, until one day, when she just went and never came back. This left Seasick Steve with 12 puppies. This story is followed by a song, with Steve on guitar and his son P.M. Wold on drums, entitled, "12 Dog Blues".

== Track listing ==
1. "Yellow Dog" - 1:00
2. "Things Go Up" - 3:34
3. "Cut My Wings" - 3:23
4. "Fallen Off a Rock" - 4:31
5. "Dog House Boogie" - 3:31
6. "Save Me" - 2:16
7. "Hobo Low" - 3:49
8. "Shirly Lou" - 3:39
9. "My Donny" - 4:02
10. "The Dead Song" - 3:33
11. "Last Po' Man" - 4:08
12. "Salem Blues" - 3:14
13. "I'm Gone" - 2:10
14. "One True" (hidden track) - 11:04

== Personnel ==
=== Musicians ===
- Seasick Steve - vocals, guitars and foot percussion
- H.J. Wold - Marching drum
- P.M. Wold - marching snare, photography

=== Other personnel ===
- Christina Enfeldt - mastering
- Kjetil Draugedalen - Mixing
- Andy Hall - Photography

== Charts ==
=== Weekly charts ===
Chart (2007–2009)	Peak position
Belgian Albums (Ultratop Flanders)	99
Irish Albums (IRMA)	69
Scottish Albums (OCC)	37
UK Albums (OCC)	36

=== Year-end charts ===
Chart (2008)	Position
UK Albums (OCC)	183
