= Gemma Ray =

British musician

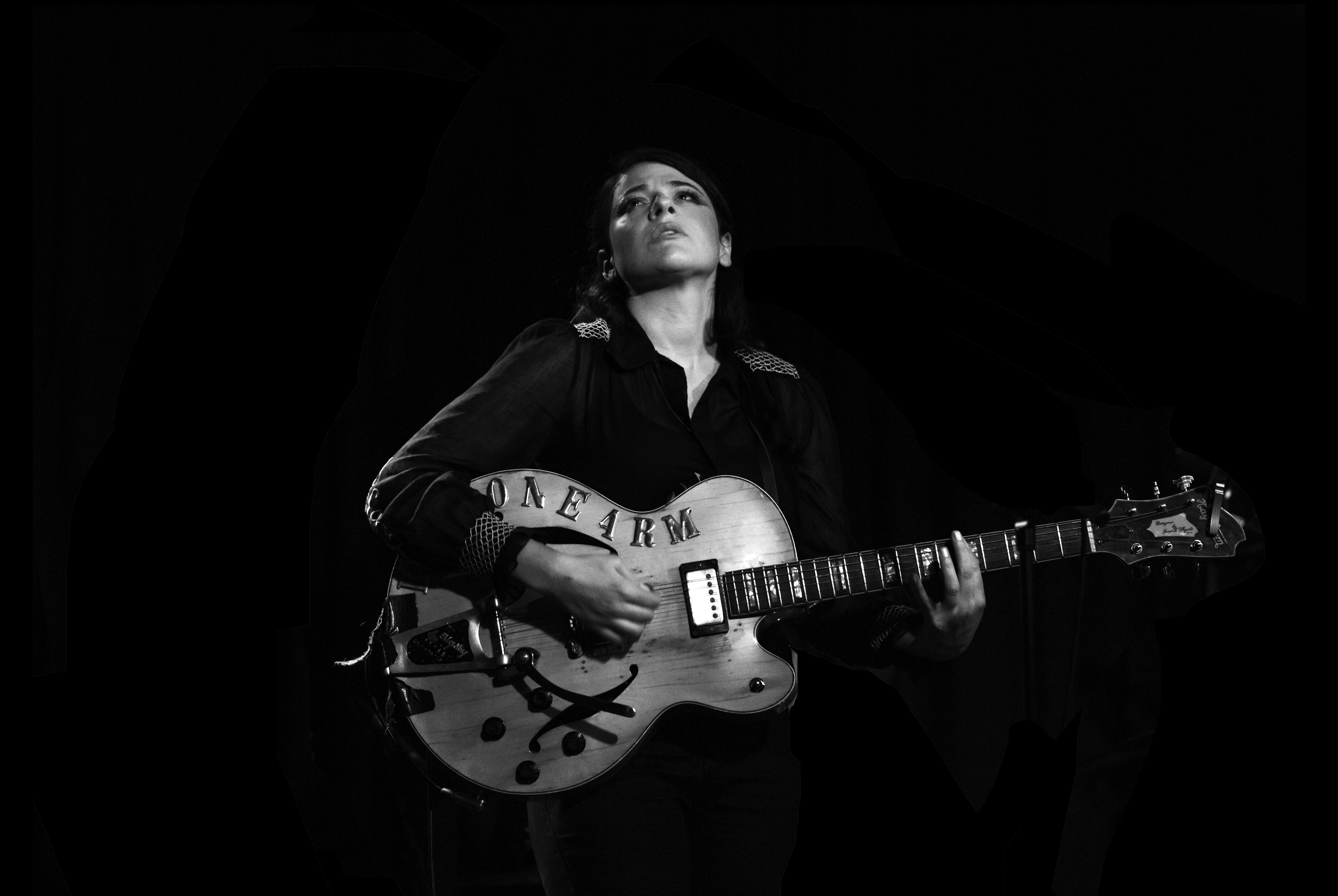
- Ray performing live (2014)

Background information
- Born: Basildon, Essex, England
- Genres: Psychedelia; noir pop; blues; gothic folk
- Occupations: Songwriter; guitarist; singer; film composer; film producer
- Label: Bronze Rat
- Website: gemmaray.tv

Gemma Ray is a British songwriter, guitarist, singer, film composer and producer.

== Background ==
Born in Basildon, Essex, England, and raised in nearby Billericay, Ray has released eight studio albums on the Bronze Rat label. She has collaborated with artists including Sparks and Alan Vega and members of Nick Cave & The Bad Seeds.

Ray fuses many disparate genres, and has been given diverse tags such as "pop-noir", "sideways blues", and "gothic folk".

== Studio albums ==
=== The Leader ===
Ray's debut album, The Leader, was co-produced by Michael J Sheehy of the band Dream City Film Club. Released on 2 June 2008, it featured the single "Hard Shoulder" / "Name Your Lord".

Unable to tour the album as a result of being struck down by illness, Ray wrote and recorded the album Lights Out Zoltar!

In 2018, The Leader was reissued on vinyl as an exclusive Record Store Day release to mark its 10th anniversary.

=== Lights Out Zoltar! ===
Appearing just a year on from her debut album, Ray's distinctive sound blending psychedelic noir-pop with a "wall-of-sound girl group backing" is evident on Lights Out Zoltar!. Spin magazine described the album's sound as "if Phil Spector forced his girl groups in a more noir-soundtrack direction. Ray has a truly impressive feel for vintage pop flourishes, layered to lavish effect".

The track "100 mph (In 2nd Gear)" from the album was released as a single on 23 August 2009.

Lights Out Zoltar! earned Ray an Independent Music Award. After seeing Ray perform live supporting Mott the Hoople in 2009, Led Zeppelin guitarist Jimmy Page declared Gemma Ray "not to be missed!"

=== It's A Shame About Gemma Ray ===
It's A Shame About Gemma Ray features reworkings of songs by a diverse selection of artists including Sonic Youth, Buddy Holly and The Gun Club. Recorded over five days in New York, the songs are delivered in Ray's characteristic style of guitar playing and singing. The album was recorded at the studio of Heavy Trash's Matt Verta-Ray and was released on 1 June 2010.

In support of the album, Ray appeared as a special guest of the band Grinderman on their European tour in 2011. That same year saw the release of The Runaway EP, which featured the single "Runaway" as well as a cover of The Shangri-Las song "Walking in the Sand".

=== Island Fire ===
In 2010, after appearing on TV show Rockwiz (duetting with Jon English), Ray found herself briefly stranded in Australia when the Icelandic volcano Eyjafjallajökull erupted. Whilst grounded there, she began work on what would become Island Fire. Co-produced with Andy Zammit and Michael Szumowski, the album was released to widespread acclaim on 12 March 2012. Island Fire, which is characterised by a mix of "sugary and savoury girl-group dramarama" and "lavish orchestral pop", peaked at number 19 on the CMJ chart. The video for the song "Rescue Me" appeared on the revamped Top of the Pops 2.

Island Fire includes two bonus tracks in the form of a collaboration with the band Sparks, which was also released as a separate 7" single entitled "Gemma Ray Sings Sparks (With Sparks)". Produced by Russell & Ron Mael, the songs are essentially Sparks covering Gemma covering Sparks. The artwork for the 7" was designed by Rick Froberg of the bands Drive Like Jehu, Hot Snakes and Obits.

Island Fire was released on Shock Records in Australia.

=== Down Baby Down ===
In 2013 Ray released the vinyl-only "fantasy soundtrack" album Down Baby Down, which featured Thomas Wydler of Nick Cave and the Bad Seeds. Demonstrating Ray's "formidable skills as an arranger", Down Baby Down was met with critical acclaim and prompted Mojo magazine to declare Ray an "inspired music machine". The album was performed in its entirety with Thomas Wydler, Andy Zammit and chorus ensemble at Berlin's Imperial Club on 3 December 2013.

=== Milk For Your Motors ===
Appearing soon after the picture disc single "Death Disc" (a Record Store Day exclusive), Milk For Your Motors is "an extraordinary addition to an already impressively idiosyncratic catalog". A collection of "noir-ish surf-doom ballads and expansive pop-exotica", the record features several guest appearances including Alan Vega of the band Suicide on the track "Motorbike", Howe Gelb on "The Wheel", The German Film Orchestra Babelsberg, and Deke Leonard. Its release was marked by a series of performances with the German Film Orchestra Babelsberg which was arranged by Fiona Brice and conducted by Lorenz Dangel. Mojo magazine made Milk For Your Motors the 'Album of the Week', declaring it "unpredictable and inspired...a series of remarkable musical tableaux". The album was released on 22 August 2014.

Gemma Ray toured Milk For Your Motors extensively throughout 2014 and 2015.

2015 also saw Ray perform at two special events paying tribute to the works and legacy of Lee Hazlewood, at the London Barbican, and Lead Belly at The Royal Albert Hall.

=== The Exodus Suite ===
Described as a 52-minute odyssey through her unique style of epic torch song psychedelia, The Exodus Suite was recorded live in seven days at the infamous Candy Bomber Studios by producer Ingo Krauss. The album's title reflects the personal-political themes of the songs within. The first track to be made available was "There Must Be More Than This", an Afro-Beat meets Krautrock gambol with a sprinkling of Ethiopiques (courtesy of guest pianist Carwyn Ellis, of the Zarelli and Edwyn Collins' band). The album was released on 20 May 2016.

Ray warmed up many of the tracks as special guest to the Jon Spencer Blues Explosion across Europe in February 2016.

=== Psychogeology ===
Psychogeology is Ray's most lush and lavish record to date, calling on influences such as The Beach Boys and Fleetwood Mac. Recorded in part at Ray's own studio in Berlin's old mint by the River Spree, but mainly by Ingo Krauss at Candy Bomber Studios, Psychogeology is Ray's most personal record to date. It was preceded by the single "Blossom Crawls", which received airplay on BBC Radio 6 Music. The album was released on 15 February 2019 and was supported with a tour of Germany, France, Switzerland and the UK.

== Film and TV work ==
Ray has contributed music to several films and television series around the world. She has provided a bespoke version of her song "900 Miles" for the horror film Mum & Dad.

In 2011 she wrote, arranged and recorded the theme song for the TV series Femme Fatales.

In 2015 she wrote, arranged and recorded the score for the German film Vorstadtrocker by The Plura Sisters.

Also in 2015, Ray worked with Wim Wenders on the restoration of his early material which led to a special performance at Berlin's Berlinale Film Festival. At Wenders' request, Ray performed at the opening party for the Golden Bear Awards alongside the band Calexico.

Her music has also featured on shows such as Netflix's Russian Doll, The Killing, What Remains, Switch and Ringer, as well as films such as Sticky Notes and Sex & Crime.

Ray has appeared on TV shows including Rockwiz, Spicks & Specks, Jam Sandwich and Top of the Pops 2.

== Collaborations ==
Ray has collaborated with several notable artists throughout her career. A chance meeting in Los Angeles with Ron and Russell Mael of the band Sparks led to the band collaborating. The result, a 7-inch single entitled "Gemma Ray sings Sparks (with Sparks)", features the band covering Ray's own interpretation of two of their songs.

Her most frequent and long term collaborator is Andy Zammit, who plays drums with her live and is also involved in the production of many of her albums.

== Discography ==
=== Albums ===
Year	Title
2008	The Leader
2010	Lights Out Zoltar!
2010	It's A Shame About Gemma Ray
2012	Island Fire
2013	Down Baby Down
2014	Milk For Your Motors
2016	The Exodus Suite
2019	Psychogeology
2023	Gemma Ray & The Death Bell Gang
