= Keepin' the Horse Between Me and the Ground =

Album by Seasick Steve

Studio album by Seasick Steve
- Released: October 7, 2016
- Recorded: 2016
- Genre: Acoustic rock, folk, blues
- Length: 77:26
- Label: Caroline International, Bronze Rat, There's a Dead Skunk Records
- Producer: Seasick Steve

Seasick Steve chronology
Sonic Soul Surfer (2015)	Keepin' the Horse Between Me and the Ground (2016)	Can U Cook? (2018)

Singles from Keepin' the Horse Between Me and the Ground
- 1. "Gypsy Blood"

Keepin' the Horse Between Me and the Ground is the eighth studio album by American blues musician Seasick Steve. It was released on October 7, 2016. and peaked 8 on the UK Albums Chart.

== Background ==
On June 5, 2016, Seasick Steve announced Keepin' the Horse Between Me and the Ground from his YouTube channel. Shortly after, a European tour was announced, with concerts in Paris, Zurich, Amsterdam among others.

== Track listing ==
=== CD 1 ===
All tracks are written by Seasick Steve.

No.	Title	Music	Length
1.	"Keep That Horse Between You And The Ground"		5:44
2.	"Walkin' Blues"		4:18
3.	"Bullseye"	Wurlitzer Piano by Henry James Wold	3:44
4.	"Gypsy Blood"		3:00
5.	"Shipwreck Love"	Fiddle by Georgina Leach	5:25
6.	"Hell"		6:11
7.	"What A Thang"		4:27
8.	"Grass Is Greener"	Fiddle by Georgina Leach; Stand up bass by Tom Barnett	3:31
9.	"Don't Take It Away"		3:38
10.	"Lonely Road"	Fiddle by Georgina Leach	4:02
Total length:			44:00

=== CD 2 ===
All tracks are written by Seasick Steve, except where noted.

No.	Title	Music	Length
1.	"Hard Knocks"		3:50
2.	"Maybe I Might"		4:10
3.	"Gentle on My Mind" (John Hartford)		3:46
4.	"Ride"		2:50
5.	"Everybody's Talkin'" (Fred Neil)		2:55
6.	"Walkin' Man"		2:57
7.	"Southern Biscuits"	Mixed by Vance Powell	2:16
8.	"Gonna Get There"		3:56
9.	"Signed D.C." (Arthur Lee)	Harmonica by Burt Dredge	3:04
10.	"I'm So Lonesome" (Hank Williams)	Mixed by Vance Powell | Vocals by Amy Lavere	3:42
Total length:			33:26

== Charts ==
Chart (2016)	Peak position
Belgian Albums (Ultratop Flanders)	31
Belgian Albums (Ultratop Wallonia)	46
Dutch Albums (Album Top 100)	51
French Albums (SNEP)	78
German Albums (Offizielle Top 100)	72
Irish Albums (IRMA)	83
Scottish Albums (OCC)	7
Swiss Albums (Schweizer Hitparade)	43
UK Albums (OCC)	8
US Top Blues Albums (Billboard)	8
