= Cheap (album) =

Studio album by Seasick Steve and the Level Devils
- Released: 2004
- Genre: Blues
- Length: 59:49
- Label: Bronzerat

Seasick Steve and the Level Devils chronology
Cheap (2004)	Dog House Music (2006)

Professional ratings
Review scores
Source	Rating
AllMusic	3.5/5 stars

Cheap is the first album by Seasick Steve. It consists of songs by him and his Swedish/Norwegian band The Level Devils, and also two stories from his life as a hobo.

The Level Devils consisted of the Norwegian Kai Christoffersen playing the drums and the Swedish Jo Husmo on bass guitar.

== Hidden track ==
A hidden track can be found at the 4:20 mark of the last listed track "Rooster Blues". No title is given.

== Track listing ==
1. "Cheap" - 4:05
2. "Rockin' Chair" - 3:35
3. "Hobo Blues" - 3:01
4. "Story #1" - 5:45
5. "Sorry Mr. Jesus" - 4:17
6. "Love Thang" - 3:44
7. "Dr. Jekyll and Mr. Hyde" - 5:14
8. "Story #2" - 7:06
9. "8 Ball" - 3:41
10. "Xmas Prison Blues" - 4:16
11. "Levi Song" - 4:19
12. "Rooster Blues" - 10:47

== Personnel ==
- Seasick Steve - guitars and foot percussion
- Jo Husmo - bass guitar
- Kai Christoffersen - drums
