= A Trip a Stumble a Fall Down on Your Knees =

Album by Seasick Steve

Studio album by Seasick Steve
- Released: June 7, 2024
- Recorded: 2024
- Studio: Sputnik (Nashville); Castaway 7 (Ventura); Studio Paradiso (Oslo)
- Genre: Blues; country blues
- Length: 77:26
- Label: So Recordings
- Producer: Seasick Steve

Seasick Steve chronology
Only on Vinyl (2022)	A Trip a Stumble a Fall Down on Your Knees (2024)

Singles from A Trip a Stumble a Fall Down on Your Knees
- 1. "Backbone Slip" Released: February 14, 2024; 2. "Funky Music" Released: March 6, 2024; 3. "Let the Music Talk" Released: March 6, 2024; 4. "Internet Cowboys" Released: April 24, 2024

A Trip a Stumble a Fall Down on Your Knees is the thirteenth studio album by American blues musician Seasick Steve. It was produced by Steve himself, and was released on June 7, 2024, through So Recordings. It was preceded by four singles: "Backbone Slip", "Funky Music", "Let the Music Talk", and "Internet Cowboys".

== Background ==
The album was officially announced on February 14, 2024. In a statement regarding the project, Seasick Steve explained "this album was made by mistake, as the title suggests we just tripped and stumbled into it, and it became my favorite album ever and the piece of work I'm most proud of to date. There's not a week goes by that I don't thank my lucky stars for that night on the Hootenanny which has brought us here to this record." To promote the album, Steve did six record store appearances throughout the UK, and performed at Cheltenham Racecourse, Black Deer Festival, Wychwood Festival, and on the Pyramid Stage at the 2024 Glastonbury Festival.

== Track listing ==
All tracks are written by Seasick Steve.

A Trip a Stumble a Fall Down on Your Knees track listing
No.	Title	Length
1.	"Move to the Country"	4:52
2.	"Internet Cowboys"	4:04
3.	"San Francisco Sound '67"	5:14
4.	"A Trip and a Stumble (For Leyla)"	4:40
5.	"This Way"	4:21
6.	"Backbone Slip"	4:19
7.	"Let the Music Talk"	4:07
8.	"You Don't Know"	4:29
9.	"Funky Music"	4:10
10.	"Cryin' Out Loud"	4:15
11.	"Soul Food"	4:22
12.	"Elisabeth"	4:11
Total length:		53:09

== Personnel ==
Musicians

- Seasick Steve – "string things and hollering"
- Crazy Dan Magnusson – drums
- Carmine Rojas – bass
- Carey Frank – keyboards
- Luther Dickinson – lead slide guitar
- Chris Powell – percussion
- Kim Fleming – vocals
- Janelle Means – vocals
- Joshua Shilling – vocals
- Marc Franklin – trumpet, flugelhorn
- Art Edmaiston – tenor saxophone, baritone saxophone
- Amund Maarud – solo guitar on "San Francisco Sound '67"
- Jonas Kamprad – drums on "A Trip and a Stumble"
- Fats Kaplin – pedal steel on "Move to the Country"

Technical

- Seasick Steve – production, recording
- Stuart Hawkes – mastering
- Vance Powell – mixing, additional recording
- Crazy Dan Magnusson – recording
- JP Hesser – recording on "Move to the Country", "San Francisco Sound '67", "Backbone Slip", and "You Don't Know"
- Christian Engfelt – guitar recording on "San Francisco Sound '67"
- Marc Franklin – arrangements
- Koehn Terry – mixing assistance, additional recording

Visuals

- DL Wold – design
- Stuart Ford – design
- Torgeir Trondsen – photography

== Charts ==
Chart (2024)	Peak position
Belgian Albums (Ultratop Wallonia)	177
German Albums (Offizielle Top 100)	98
Scottish Albums (OCC)	13
UK Albums (OCC)	23
UK Americana Albums (OCC)	2
UK Album Downloads (OCC)	12
UK Independent Albums (OCC)	1
UK Jazz & Blues Albums (OCC)	1
UK Vinyl Albums (OCC)	2
