= You Can't Teach an Old Dog New Tricks =

You Can’t Teach An Old Dog New Tricks

Studio album by Seasick Steve
- Released: May 27, 2011
- Genre: Blues
- Label: Play It Again Sam
- Producer: Seasick Steve

Seasick Steve chronology
Man from Another Time (2009)	You Can’t Teach An Old Dog New Tricks (2011)	Hubcap Music (2013)

You Can't Teach An Old Dog New Tricks is the fifth studio album by Seasick Steve. It was released on May 30, 2011, on Play It Again Sam. The album features former Led Zeppelin bass guitarist John Paul Jones. It peaked at number 6 on the UK Albums Chart and number 18 on the Irish Albums Chart.

In 2012, it was awarded a diamond certification from the Independent Music Companies Association which indicated sales of at least 200,000 copies throughout Europe.

== Track listing ==
All songs written by Seasick Steve except "Whiskey Ballad" by Paul Martin Wold.

No.	Title	Length
1.	"Treasures"	3:52
2.	"You Can't Teach an Old Dog New Tricks"	3:34
3.	"Burnin' Up"	4:07
4.	"Don't Know Why She Love Me But She Do"	3:24
5.	"Have Mercy on the Lonely"	2:35
6.	"Whiskey Ballad"	3:43
7.	"Back in the Doghouse"	4:15
8.	"Underneath a Blue and Cloudless Sky"	3:05
9.	"What a Way to Go"	3:15
10.	"Party"	4:02
11.	"Days Gone"	3:44
12.	"It's a Long Long Way"	3:39

Bonus tracks
No.	Title	Length
1.	"Write Me a Few Lines"	4:08
2.	"Levee Camp Blues"	6:17

== Personnel ==
According to the official CD liner notes.

- Seasick Steve – vocals, guitar, banjo
- John Paul Jones – bass guitar on "You Can' Teach an Old Dog new Tricks..." and "Back in the Doghouse"; mandolin on "Long Long Way"
- Dan Magnusson – percussion on "You Can' Teach an Old Dog new Tricks...", "Burnin' Up", "I Don't Know Why She Love Me But She Do", "Back in the Doghouse", "Party", "Days Gone" and "It's a Long Long Way"
- Paul Martin Wold – washboard, backing vocals and whistling on "Whiskey Ballad"
- Georgina Leach – fiddle on "Treasures" and "Long Long Way"
- The Lyndhurst Rabble Choir – "It's a Long Long Way"

== Charts ==
You Can't Teach an Old Dog New Tricks was the second biggest-selling blues album of 2011 in the UK, with sales of 131,000 copies.

=== Weekly charts ===
Chart (2011)	Peak position
Belgian Albums (Ultratop Flanders)	16
Dutch Albums (Album Top 100)	9
Irish Albums (IRMA)	18
UK Albums (Official Charts)	6

=== Year-end charts ===
Chart (2011)	Position
Dutch Albums (Album Top 100)	93
UK Albums (OCC)	83

=== Certifications ===
Country	Provider	Sales	Certification
United Kingdom	BPI	100,000+	Gold

== Release history ==
Country	Date	Format	Label
United Kingdom	27 May 2011	Digital download	Play It Again Sam
United Kingdom	30 May 2011	CD	Play It Again Sam

== Changes to band ==
John Paul Jones performed with Seasick Steve and his drummer Dan Magnusson on the British television show Later... with Jools Holland. It was later confirmed on the show that he had appeared on the album.
