= Hubcap Music =

Studio album by Seasick Steve
- Released: April 29, 2013
- Genre: Blues
- Length: 48:00
- Label: Fiction Records Third Man Records
- Producer: Seasick Steve

Seasick Steve chronology
You Can't Teach an Old Dog New Tricks (2011)	Hubcap Music (2013)	Sonic Soul Surfer (2015)

Professional ratings
Aggregate scores
Source	Rating
Metacritic	71/100
Review scores
Source	Rating
Uncut	4/5 stars
The Independent	4/5 stars
This Is Fake DIY	7/10 stars
musicOMH	3/5 stars
NME	3/10 stars
Sputnikmusic	3.5/5 stars

Hubcap Music is the sixth studio album by Seasick Steve. The title derives from his Morris Minor guitar made out of two hubcaps placed back-to-back. Steve uses the guitar frequently, both live and in the studio.

The song "Down On The Farm" was debuted live at the 2012 Pinkpop Festival in the Netherlands. A music video was also released, with Seasick Steve dancing behind his farm with the hubcap guitar in his hand, in similar fashion to The Black Keys' song, "Lonely Boy".

One week before the release, a video for "Purple Shadows" premiered, featuring Steve playing a stripped version of the song on the acoustic guitar.

Guests on the album include Dan Magnusson on drums (who also plays live with Seasick Steve), John Paul Jones on bass (among other instruments), and Jack White on guitar on the track "The Way I Do".

== Track listing ==
No.	Title	Length
1.	"Down on the Farm"	3:50
2.	"Self Sufficient Man"	4:16
3.	"Keep On Keepin' On"	3:53
4.	"Over You"	3:18
5.	"The Way I Do"	4:50
6.	"Purple Shadows"	4:19
7.	"Freedom Road"	5:35
8.	"Home"	3:31
9.	"Hope"	3:14
10.	"Heavy Weight"	5:09
11.	"Coast Is Clear"	5:08

== Charts ==
Chart (2013)	Peak position
Belgian Albums (Ultratop Flanders)	32
Belgian Albums (Ultratop Wallonia)	140
Dutch Albums (Album Top 100)	46
Scottish Albums (OCC)	10
UK Albums (OCC)	14
UK Album Downloads (OCC)	28
UK Jazz & Blues Albums (OCC)	1
US Top Blues Albums (Billboard)	10

== Personnel ==
According to the official CD liner notes:

- Seasick Steve – vocals, guitar
- Dan Magnusson – percussion on all tracks except "Hope" and "Over You"; podorythmie on "Hope"
- John Paul Jones – bass guitar on "Down on the Farm", "Keep on Keepin' On", "The Way I Do", "Freedom Road", "Home", "Heavy Weight" and "Coast Is Clear"; mandolin on "Over You"; lap steel ukulele on "Hope"; Hammond organ on "Coast Is Clear"; harmony vocals on "Over You"
- Jack White – lead guitar on "The Way I Do"
- Luther Dickinson – slide guitar on "Home"
- Elizabeth Cook – vocals on "Purple Shadows"
- Fats Kaplin – pedal steel guitar on "Purple Shadows" and "Heavy Weight"; fiddle on "Heavy Weight"
