= Seasick Steve =

American blues musician (born 1951)

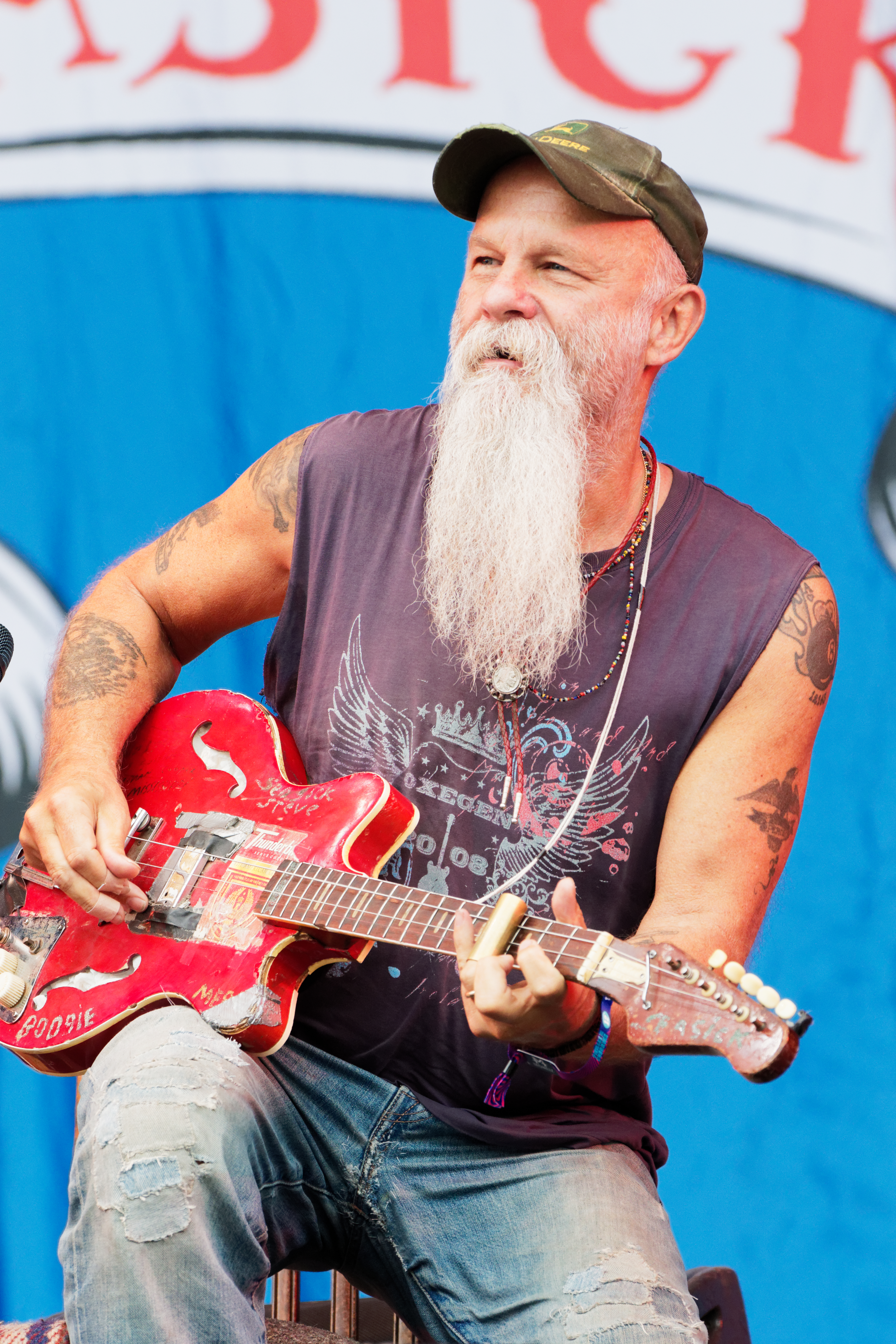
- Seasick Steve in 2017

Background information
- Also known as: Steven Gene Wold
- Born: Steven Gene Leach; March 19, 1951 (age 75); Oakland, California, U.S.
- Genres: Country blues; blues; blues rock
- Occupations: Musician; songwriter; recording engineer
- Instruments: Vocals; guitar; diddley bow; stomp box; banjo; harmonica
- Labels: Caroline International; Atlantic; Warner Bros.; Bronzerat; Third Man; Dead Skunk
- Website: seasicksteve.com

Steven Gene Wold (né Leach; March 19, 1951), commonly known as Seasick Steve, is an American blues musician. He plays mostly personalized guitars and sings, usually about his early life doing casual work. From the late 1960s, he worked as a musician and recording engineer in the US and Europe; he played bass in Shanti and was in a disco band called Crystal Grass as well as other bands. He also pursued other works, including producing an album for Modest Mouse. He achieved his breakthrough, initially in the UK, at the end of 2006 when he appeared on Jools Holland's annual Hootenanny as Seasick Steve. He has since released a number of commercially successful albums, including I Started Out with Nothin and I Still Got Most of It Left, Man from Another Time, and Sonic Soul Surfer.

== Life and career ==
The publicity about Wold at the time he first became successful in Britain, in the mid-2000s, suggested that he was then aged in his sixties, and emphasised his past as a hobo in Tennessee and Mississippi. In a 2008 interview in Memphis, Wold was quoted as stating: "I came down here as a young feller looking for the blues, but I didn't find them... Wasn't in Clarksdale but an hour before a big, old redneck policeman ran me right out of town again. That was how it was back then, and there were some places hereabouts you just didn't go if you were a hobo." By his own account, he would travel long distances by hopping freight trains, looking for work as a farm laborer or in other seasonal jobs. He claimed that he had worked at a carnival, as a cowboy and as a migrant worker. In a 2007 interview, he said: "I rode them [freight trains] for 14 years off and on..", adding "I've been married to this one girl for 25 years, so I’m a little bit settled down now..."

In 2016, an unauthorized biography by Matthew Wright presented evidence that parts of Wold's backstory may have been exaggerated. Wright drew on interviews with Wold's estranged eldest son as well as previously published material covering his career in music since the late 1960s, and commented that Wold was "retiring about facts of his own life".

=== Childhood and early life ===
Steve Wold was born in Oakland, California, as Steven Gene Leach, though his biographer suggests that he may have been adopted as a baby. He took the surname Wold in the early 1980s, from that of his second wife. In 2000, he gave his age as 50, though later publicity implied that he was older. Official birth records confirm his birth year as 1951.

When he was four years old, his parents split up and he continued to live with his mother. He claimed that as a child he was taught to play the guitar by K. C. Douglas, who worked at his grandfather's garage, and later realised that he had been taught the blues. Douglas wrote the song "Mercury Blues" and had played with Tommy Johnson in the early 1940s. His mother remarried, to a Korean War veteran who Wold characterized as abusive, and, at the age of about 13, Wold claimed that he left home following a violent confrontation with his stepfather.

Wold claimed to have lived rough and on the road in Tennessee, Mississippi and elsewhere, until at least the late 1960s. However, Wright's biography claims that Wold lived in Haight-Ashbury, San Francisco, for some time from 1965. He attended the Monterey Pop Festival, regularly saw bands such as The Grateful Dead perform in the area, and became acquainted with Janis Joplin and Jimi Hendrix.

=== Early musical activities ===
In about 1969, he toured clubs in the region as a backing musician with Lightnin' Hopkins. In 1970, as Steve Leach, he became the bass player in an innovative band, Shanti, who performed a fusion of Indian and rock music. Other band members included Zakir Hussain and Aashish Khan, and all the band members were adherents of Transcendental Meditation. In liner notes for a 2015 reissue of Shanti's only album, writer Richie Unterberger states that "bassist Steve Leach has reinvented himself as the blues musician Seasick Steve", and his participation in Shanti was confirmed by Seattle band the Tremens.

He left California in 1972 and moved to Paris, France, where he busked in the Métro. He occasionally returned to California where he married Victoria Johnson in 1974; they had two sons together but later divorced. Wold also spent time in the 1970s in Hawaii, and worked as a session musician and studio engineer, as well as in occasional manual jobs. He has claimed to have played with other musicians including Son House, John Lee Hooker, Albert King, and Joni Mitchell around this time. In 1976, he worked with French producer Lee Hallyday and fronted the disco group Crystal Grass. Leach appeared on two Crystal Grass albums released by Philips Records in France, Dance Up a Storm and Ocean Potion, the latter credited to Steve Leach with the Crystal Grass Orchestra. The group also released several singles including "You Can Be What You Dream". He also sang on the first album released by Mike Love's side project Celebration, a collaboration with members of the Paris-based band King Harvest.

Around 1980, Steve Leach returned to Europe. In 1982, he appeared as singer and guitarist on an album, Women and Sports, by the band Clean, Athletic & Talented (C.A.T.), co-writing their single "I Love To Touch Young Girls". He met Elisabeth Wold in a blues bar in Oslo, Norway, and adopted her surname after she became his second wife. For a time in the early 1980s, he lived in London, and then with Elisabeth in Skelmersdale, England, which biographer Wright notes is the location of a major Transcendental Meditation movement center. He later claimed to have run a recording studio in Europe before selling it.

After returning to the US, he trained as a paramedic, before moving with his wife and their three sons from Nashville, Tennessee, to Olympia, near Seattle, in 1991. The move was partly motivated by Elisabeth Wold's desire to live in an area reminiscent of her native Norway, but also reflected the area's developing indie music scene. In Olympia, Wold established his own guitar store and recording studio, Moon Music. He was acquainted with Kurt Cobain, and began producing records by local musicians, including Kathleen Hanna and Fitz of Depression. Wold produced the 1996 debut album by Modest Mouse, This Is a Long Drive for Someone with Nothing to Think About, and recordings by the band P.E.Z. on which he played guitar. He also worked closely with a local band, the Tremens, and with them started to form a band, Dr Steel and the Forty-nines, with himself as singer and lead guitarist, but this fell through. A 2001 interview with the Tremens described Wold as a "Pacific Northwest music icon... who has put his recording stamp on some of the most influential bands to come out of Puget Sound."

In 2001, Wold closed Moon Music, after being involved in up to 50 albums made there. He said at the time: "I'm finished with America. I'm 50 years old now, and I've been watching greed play the main stage since I was a teenager. I just can't stand it anymore." With his wife and their sons, he moved to Notodden in Norway, home of the Notodden Blues Festival, and set up a studio, Juke Joint, with vintage equipment that he had acquired over the years. After Wold became ill on a boat trip between Norway and Denmark, he adopted the name "Seasick Steve" as a parallel to that of blues musician Homesick James, and started to form a band, Seasick Steve and the Level Devils.

Wold released his first album, entitled Cheap, recorded in 2004 with the Level Devils as his rhythm section, with Jo Husmo on stand-up bass and Kai Christoffersen on drums. His debut solo album, Dog House Music was released by Bronzerat Records on 26 November 2006, after he was championed by an old friend, Joe Cushley, DJ on the Balling The Jack blues show on London radio station Resonance FM.

=== Breakthrough and subsequent career ===
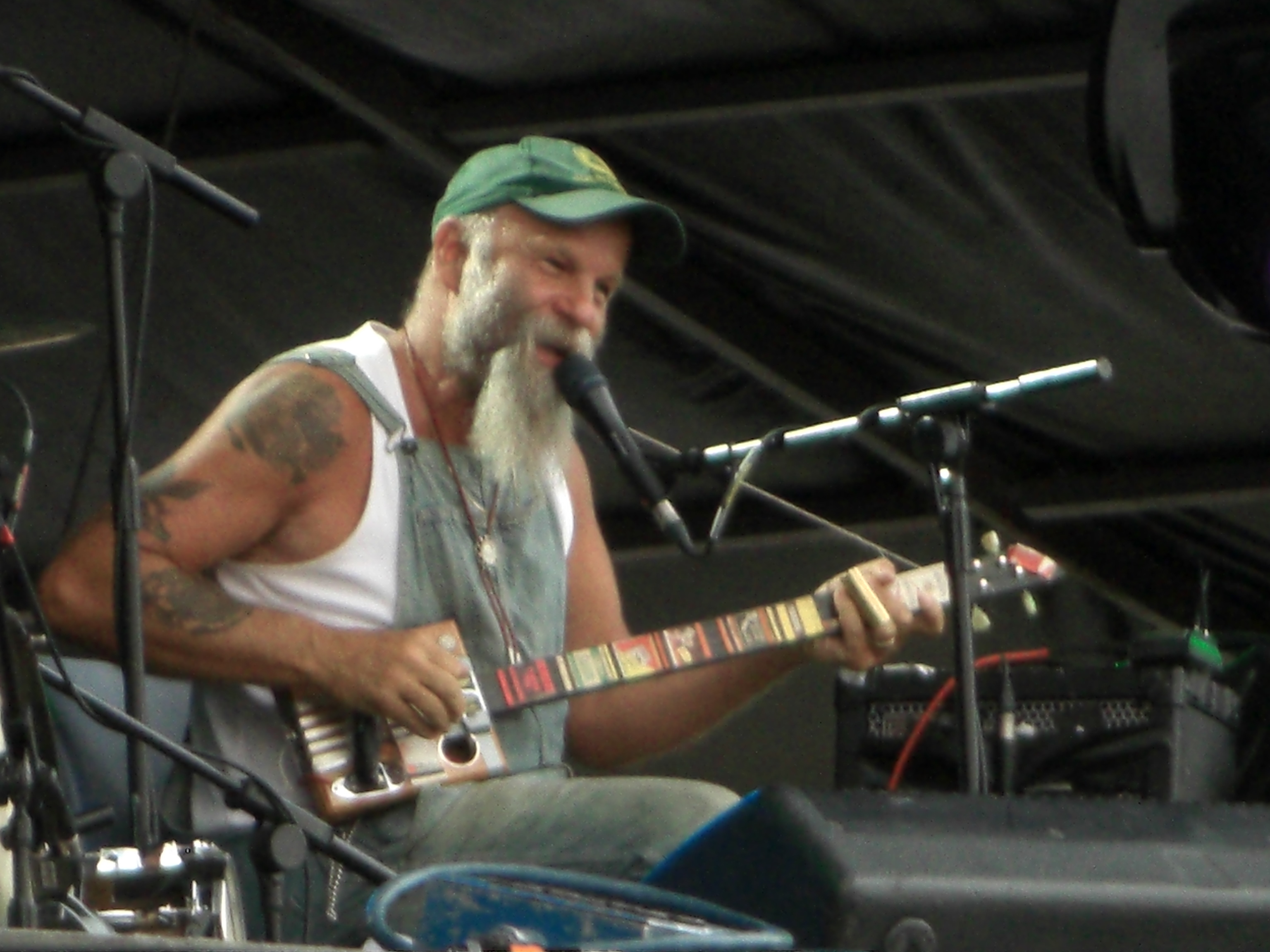
Wold performing in 2009 at the Hard Rock Calling festival in London's Hyde Park

Wold made his first UK television appearance on Jools Holland's annual Hootenanny BBC TV show on New Year's Eve 2006. He performed a live rendition of "Dog House Boogie" on the "Three String Trance Wonder" and the "Mississippi Drum Machine". After that show, his popularity exploded in Britain, and he commented "I can't believe it, all of the sudden I'm like the cat's meow!"

He was well received in the UK, winning the 2007 MOJO Award for Best Breakthrough Act and going on to appear at major UK festivals such as Reading, Leeds and Glastonbury. In 2007, he played more UK festivals than any other artist. At that time, it was claimed in press coverage that he was 66 years old, though he was later demonstrated to be ten years younger.

Wold toured early in 2008, playing in various venues and festivals in the UK. He was joined on stage by drummer Dan Magnusson. KT Tunstall also dueted with Wold at the London Astoria in January 2008. Wold also played many other festivals throughout the world in 2008, including Fuji Rock in Japan, East Coast Blues & Roots Music Festival in Australia, also in April 2008, and Roskilde in Denmark.

Wold's major-label debut, I Started Out with Nothin and I Still Got Most of It Left was recorded with Dan Magnusson on drums, was released by Warner Music on 29 September 2008, and features Ruby Turner and Nick Cave's Grinderman.

He has toured the UK extensively since 2007 being supported by performers including Duke Garwood, Gemma Ray, Billie the Vision and the Dancers, Amy LaVere, Melody Nelson, and Joe Gideon & The Shark. His tours in October 2008 and January 2009 were all sold out and included performances at the Royal Albert Hall, the Edinburgh Queen's Hall, the Grand Opera House in Belfast, the Apollo in Manchester, the City Hall in Newcastle, and the London Hammersmith Apollo.

In 2009, Wold was nominated for a Brit Award in the category of International Solo Male Artist, That same year, BBC Four broadcast a documentary of Wold visiting the southern USA entitled Seasick Steve: Bringing It All Back Home. On 21 January, Wold hosted "Folk America: Hollerers, Stompers and Old Time Ramblers" at the Barbican in London, a show that was also televised and shown with the documentary on BBC Four as part of a series tracing American roots music.

In an interview with an Australian magazine, Wold attributed much of his unlikely success to his cheap and weather-beaten guitar, "The Trance Wonder" and reveals the guitar's mojo might come from supernatural sources.

I got it from Sherman, who is a friend of mine down in Mississippi, who had bought it down at a Goodwill store. When we were down there last time he says to me, 'I didn't tell you when you bought it off me, but that guitar used to be haunted'. I say, 'What are you talking about, Sherman?'. He says, 'There's 50 solid citizens here in Como who'll tell you this guitar is haunted. It's the darnedest thing – we'd leave it over in the potato barn and we'd come back in and it would be moved. You'd put it down somewhere and the next morning you'd come back and it would have moved. When you took that guitar the ghost in the barn left'. He told me this not very long ago and I said to him, 'Sherman! Why didn't you tell me this before?' and he said, 'Well the ghost was gone – I didn't want it around here no more!'

On 3 January 2010, Wold appeared on the popular BBC motoring show Top Gear as the Star In A Reasonably Priced Car. A friend of Steve's had given him a guitar made with hubcaps off a Morris Minor (he owned one at the time), and he played it on air.

In February 2010, Wold was nominated for a Brit Award in the category of International Solo Male Artist for the second consecutive year.

In 2010, Wold made numerous festival appearances throughout the summer, including the Pyramid Stage at the Glastonbury Festival, the main stage at V Festival, the main stage at the Hop Farm Festival and many more.

In February 2011, Wold signed to Play It Again Sam to release his new album with the exception of the US, where it will be released on Third Man Records. Subsequently, his new album You Can't Teach an Old Dog New Tricks was released on his new labels and it was announced that former Led Zeppelin bassist John Paul Jones had played on the new album, and performed alongside Wold to promote it. This caused some to believe that he will tour with Wold as a part of his backing band, joining his then-current drummer Dan. John Paul Jones did indeed appear onstage to play with Wold at the Isle of Wight 2011 festival and on the main stage of Rock Werchter 2011, and at the Bonnaroo festival in Manchester Tennessee in 2014.

On 16 August 2014, he was the headline act at Beautiful Days in Honiton, Devon, and, on the 24 August, he headlined at 'Victorious Festival' in Southsea, Portsmouth, England.

Seasick Steve released his eighth album on 7 October 2016, called Keepin' the Horse Between Me and the Ground.

This was followed by Can u Cook? in 2018.

== Musical equipment ==
Wold owns and plays several obscure and personalized instruments.

=== Guitars ===
==== The Three-String Trance Wonder ====
This is a normal guitar that resembles a GHI Guitar made in Japan in the 1960s. It has a 1950s Harmony pickup added with duct tape, and is tuned to G, G, and B (middle G is one octave higher than the bottom). He was given the guitar by a friend who had it nailed to his wall as a decoration, but at his gigs, he often tells the story that he bought it for US$75 in this condition from a man who later told him he only paid US$25 for it the day before, and claims to have vowed never to add another string, and that he would tour the world telling his story of how the seller ripped him off. A lot of the time he also adds, while picking up or putting away the guitar, that it is the "biggest piece of shit in the world, I swear." In a BBC interview, Wold claimed that the guitar was found by a friend, just with the three strings on it, and he decided to keep it that way.

==== Hubcap guitars ====
When on the TV show Top Gear, presenter Jeremy Clarkson commented that Wold's car history of over 100 cars included a Morris Minor. Wold then presented a four-string guitar that his friend Davey Chivers had made out of two old hubcaps from a 1970 Minor 1000 named Cynthia joined back-to-back and his wife's broomstick. Wold then played it a little in the episode. Clarkson replied that it was the best use of a Morris Minor he had ever seen.

A similar guitar was made out of Hudson Terraplane hubcaps, one of them given to him by Jack White, referring to "Terraplane Blues" by Robert Johnson.

=== Other ===
==== The Mississippi Drum Machine ====
A small wooden box that is stomped upon, providing percussion. It is decorated with a Mississippi motorcycle registration plate ("MC33583"), and a small piece of carpet.

==== Roland CUBE ====
A Roland CUBE 30 W amplifier placed on a chair to his left and set to the 'tweed' setting.

==== Fender Bassman ====
A Fender Bassman amplifier, used at the Pinkpop Festival 2012.

== Nickname ==
When asked about his nickname, Wold has said: "because it's just true: I always get seasick". When he was ill on a ferry from Norway to Copenhagen, later in his life, a friend began playfully using the name and, despite Wold not rising to it for a while, it stuck. When asked about his name on British Sunday morning television show Something for the Weekend, he replied, "I just get sick on boats".

== Personal life ==
Wold has five adult sons, and has married twice, marrying his second wife in the early 1980s. Wold has said that he has problems putting down roots in one place, and he and his wife have lived in 59 houses to date, including Norway and the United Kingdom.

Wold's son Didrik is an illustrator, and has designed his father's album artwork, merchandise, print ads, and websites. His youngest son, Paul Martin Wold, played drums on Dog House Music and first made a guest appearance with him on percussion at the Astoria in January 2008. He has since performed with Wold frequently, playing washboard, shakers, tambourine, floor tom and occasionally guitar. He also works as Steve's guitar tech. Paul Martin Wold, aka "Wishful Thinking", released his debut album A Waste of Time Well Spent on 2 November 2009, and showcased a selection from the album while touring the UK with his father.

== Discography ==
=== Albums ===
- Cheap (2004)
- Dog House Music (2006)
- I Started Out with Nothin and I Still Got Most of It Left (2008)
- Man from Another Time (2009)
- Songs for Elizabeth (2010)
- You Can't Teach an Old Dog New Tricks (2011)
- Hubcap Music (2013)
- Sonic Soul Surfer (2015)
- Keepin' the Horse Between Me and the Ground (2016)
- Can U Cook? (2018)
- Love and Peace (2020)
- Blues in Mono (2020)
- Only on Vinyl (2022)
- A Trip a Stumble a Fall Down on Your Knees (2024)
- The Last Season of America (2026)

== Backing band ==
Current members

- Dan Magnusson – drums, percussion (2008–present)
- John Paul Jones – bass guitar (2011–2013)
- Isiah Ferrante - Backup Vocals

Former members, as "The Level Devils"

- Jo Husmo – bass guitar (2001–?)
- Kai Christoffersen – drums, percussion (2001–2004)
- Dan Magnusson – drums, percussion (2004–06)
