= Bronze Rat Records =

British independent record label

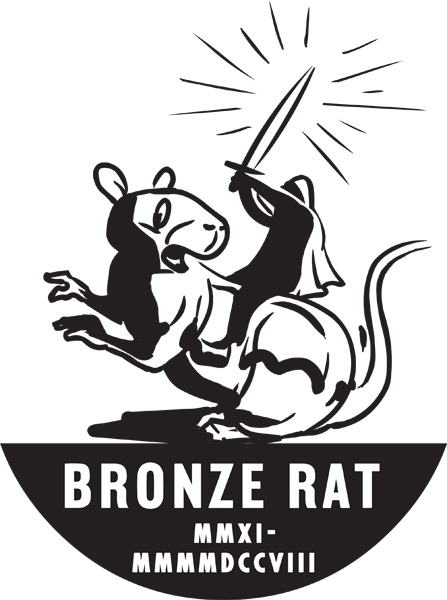
- Founded: 31 December 2005
- Founder: Andrew Zammit
- Genre: Torch Song Psychedelia, Death Jazz, Sci-fi, American't, Problem Songs, Voice Memos, Rock plus Roll, 100% Silk, Soundtrack.
- Country of origin: UK
- Location: Offices in Berlin, Los Angeles and Caldey Island
- Official website: bronzerat.com

Bronze Rat Records (aka Bronzerat) is a British independent record label, established in London in 2006 by Welsh musician and producer Andrew Zammit, and also encompasses subsidiary label Seriés Aphōnos.

Established in 2006 as an outlet for The Gemma Ray Ritual, Zammit's band with long-term collaborator Gemma Ray, the label has since has gone on to release all of her solo records, as well as releases by other artists including Dutch experimentalist Solex, Crazy World of Arthur Brown, Berlin instrumentalists The Still, and Joe Gideon.

It also serves as the main outlet in Europe for releases by Jon Spencer including The Jon Spencer Blues Explosion, Heavy Trash and Boss Hog.

The label also had a short-lived stint working with the Seasick Steve, releasing his debut solo records in late 2006 and 2007.

Bronze Rat also has a publishing arm and publishes of the label roster as well as the music of Michael J Sheehy (including Miraculous Mule) and Gris-de-lin amongst others.

The Bronze Rat label's logo was designed by the artist Rick Froberg.

== Discography ==
=== Heavy Trash ===
Year	Title	Other information	Label
2009	Midnight Soul Serenade		Bronze Rat Records

=== Seasick Steve ===
Year	Title	Other information	Label
2006	Dog House Music		Bronze Rat Records
2008	I Started Out With Nothin and i Still Got Most of it Left		Warner Bros. Records/Bronze Rat Records
2009	Cheap (Limited Edition Vinyl)		Bronze Rat Records

=== Gemma Ray ===
Year	Title	Other information	Label
2006	Gemma Ray Ritual		Bronze Rat Records
2008	Hard Shoulder (single)		Bronze Rat Records
2008	The Leader (album)		Bronze Rat Records
2009	Lights Out Zoltar! (album)		Bronze Rat Records
2010	It's a shame about Gemma Ray (album)		Bronze Rat Records
2012	Island Fire (album)		Bronze Rat Records

=== Joe Gideon & The Shark ===
Year	Title	Other information	Label
2008	Harum Scarum		Bronze Rat Records
2008	DOL (single)		Bronze Rat Records
2013	Freakish		Bronze Rat Records

=== To Arms Etc ===
Year	Title	Other information	Label
2009	Corner Games		Bronze Rat Records
2009	Misbelieving(single)		Bronze Rat Records

=== Charles Campbell Jones ===
Year	Title	Other information	Label
2006	Wasting The Duke		Bronze Rat Records

=== Trost ===
Year	Title	Other information	Label
2008	Trust Me		Bronze Rat Records

=== Congregation ===
Year	Title	Other information	Label
2008	Congregation		Bronze Rat Records
2008	Feel Like Crying (single)		Bronze Rat Records

== Seriés Aphōnos ==
Seriés Aphōnos, a British subsidiary label of Bronze Rat Records, focuses on instrumental music, soundtracks, spoken word, and other curio curations. It is curated by Welsh musician, producer and label owner Andrew Zammit.

Releases include Soft Rains by Zarelli (a musical reinterpretation of a Leonard Nimoy-narrated Ray Bradbury short story from The Martian Chronicles), the first vinyl release of the Krzysztof Komeda-composed soundtrack to Roman Polanski's Dance of the Vampires/Fearless Vampire Killers, Berlin avant-punk collective Candy Bomber (whose album features guest spots from musicians including Gemma Ray, Kid Congo Powers, Toby Dammit and Jochen Arbeit (Einstürzende Neubauten), Cremator (London synth musician Matt Thompson (Zoltan, Guapo)), and The Still, who are a cast of international musicians (including Chris Abrahams of The Necks) who record in Berlin. The Still was featured in British music magazine Mojo 's list of 50 best albums of 2016.

Seriés Aphōnos' themed and recurrent artwork is inspired by the aesthetic of 1970s music libraries (such as Montparnasse 2000, Studio G, and Neuilly), and is based on a template designed and continued by Buffalo, New York artist Julian Montague.

=== Seriés Aphōnos releases ===
- SA01 – Solex – Solex Ahoy! The Sound Map Of The Netherlands
- SA02 – Gemma Ray – Down Baby Down
- SA03 – Tanger Trio & Ensemble Mondaine
- SA04 - Krzysztof Komeda - Dance of the Vampires (aka The Fearless Vampire Killers)
- SA05 - Cremator - Clear Air Turbulence
- SA06 - Zarelli - Soft Rains (featuring the voice of Leonard Nimoy)
- SA07 - Heavy Trash - Noir!
- SA08 - The Still - S/T
- BR50 - Candy Bomber - Vol. 1
