= I Started Out with Nothin and I Still Got Most of It Left =

Album by Seasick Steve

Studio album by Seasick Steve
- Released: September 29, 2008
- Genre: Blues; Country
- Length: Standard Disc 1 - 50:21; Die Cut Disc 1 - 59:41; Die Cut Disc 2 - 27:23
- Label: Warner Bros.
- Producer: Seasick Steve, Nick Brine

Seasick Steve chronology
Dog House Music (2006)	I Started Out with Nothin and I Still Got Most of It Left (2008)	Man from Another Time (2009)

Professional ratings
Review scores
Source	Rating
Allmusic	3/5 stars
The Guardian	4/5 stars
The Independent	4/5 stars
The Times	3/5 stars

I Started Out with Nothin and I Still Got Most of It Left (styled i Started out with nothin and i Still got most of it Left) is the third album by Seasick Steve. It was released on September 29, 2008. It entered the UK Albums Chart at number 9 on October 6, 2008. The album is his first on the record label Warner Bros. Records, but the vinyl releases are still on his old label, Bronzerat Records.

The record features guest musicians Ruby Turner, Grinderman and KT Tunstall. Turner's vocals were originally performed by Tunstall, although she later backed out of this role, but is still featured on the album playing flute, guitar and singing backing vocals.

The album was released in two ways: the standard edition (with only 11 tracks on one disc), and the Die Cut limited edition, which includes three bonus tracks on disc one and also a bonus disc with six tracks (two songs, four spoken word).

== Track listing ==
All song written by Seasick Steve except where noted.

=== Disc 1 ===
1. "Started Out with Nothin"
2. "Walkin Man"
3. "St. Louis Slim"
4. "Happy Man"
5. "Prospect Lane"
6. "Thunderbird"
7. "Fly by Night"
8. "Just Like a King" (Seasick Steve and Nick Cave)
9. "One True"
10. "Chiggers"
11. "My Youth"
12. "The Letter" (Wayne Carson Thompson) [*]
13. "Levy Camp Blues" (Mississippi Fred McDowell) [*]
14. "Roll and Tumble Blues" (Hambone Willie Newbern) [*]
15. "The Log Cabin" (hidden track)

Tracks marked [*] only appear on the Die Cut Limited Edition disc 1.

=== Bonus disc 2 ===
1. "Train" (spoken word)
2. "Story" (spoken word)
3. "Breakfast" (spoken word)
4. "Heart Attack"
5. "Lunch" (spoken word)
6. "Laughin' to Keep from Cryin'" (Mississippi Joe Callicott)

== Personnel ==
=== Musicians ===
- Seasick Steve - vocals, lead guitar and foot percussion
- Dan Magnusson - drums
- Ruby Turner - vocals (track 4)
- KT Tunstall - rhythm guitar (track 4), backing vocals (track 5 & 12) & flute (track 12)
- Grinderman (track 8)
  - Nick Cave - vocals
  - Jim Sclavunos - drums, percussion
  - Warren Ellis - fiddle
- Kim Fleming - backing vocals (track 1 & 4)
- Gale Mayes - backing vocals (track 1 & 4)

=== Other personnel ===
- Nick Brine - Engineering
- John Davis - Mastering
- Christopher Rowe - Mixing

== Charts ==
=== Weekly charts ===
Chart (2008–2009)	Peak position
Australian Albums (ARIA)	17
Belgian Albums (Ultratop Flanders)	38
French Albums (SNEP)	107
Irish Albums (IRMA)	13
Scottish Albums (OCC)	9
Swedish Albums (Sverigetopplistan)	30
UK Albums (OCC)	9

=== Year-end charts ===
Chart (2008)	Position
UK Albums (OCC)	153
Chart (2009)	Position
UK Albums (OCC)	92
