= Man from Another Time =

Studio album by Seasick Steve
- Released: October 19, 2009
- Genre: Blues; Country
- Length: 50:33
- Label: Warner Bros.
- Producer: Seasick Steve

Seasick Steve chronology
| I Started Out with Nothin and I Still Got Most of It Left (2008) | Man from Another Time (2009) | You Can’t Teach An Old Dog New Tricks (2011) |

Professional ratings
Review scores
| Source | Rating |
|---|---|
| AllMusic | 4/5 stars |
| Clash Magazine | 7/10 stars |
| The Guardian | 3/5 stars |
| The Telegraph | 3/5 stars |
| Type 3 Media | 7.5/10 stars |

Man from Another Time is the fourth album by Seasick Steve. It was released on October 19, 2009. It entered the UK Albums Chart at number 4 on October 25, 2009.

== Track listing ==
1. "Diddley Bo"
2. "Big Green and Yeller"
3. "Happy (To Have a Job)"
4. "The Banjo Song"
5. "Man from Another Time"
6. "That's All"
7. "Just Because I Can (CSX)"
8. "Never Go West"
9. "Dark"
10. "Wenatchee"
11. "My Home (Blue Eyes)"
12. "Seasick Boogie"
13. "Livin' on the Outside" [*]
14. "Them Roses" [*]
15. "I'm So Lonesome I Could Cry" (hidden track featuring Amy LaVere on vocals, not on vinyl version)

Tracks marked [*] only appear on deluxe edition.

== Charts ==
| Chart (2009) | Peak position |
|---|---|
| Belgium (Flanders) Album Chart | 13 |
| French Albums Chart | 191 |
| Irish Albums Chart | 15 |
| UK Albums Chart | 4 |
