= WarGames =

1983 science-fiction film directed by John Badham

- Theatrical release poster
- Directed by: John Badham
- Written by: Lawrence Lasker; Walter F. Parkes
- Produced by: Harold Schneider
- Starring: Matthew Broderick; Dabney Coleman; John Wood; Ally Sheedy
- Cinematography: William A. Fraker
- Edited by: Tom Rolf
- Music by: Arthur B. Rubinstein
- Production companies: United Artists; Sherwood Productions
- Distributed by: MGM/UA Entertainment Company (United States); United International Pictures (international)
- Release dates: May 7, 1983 (Cannes); June 3, 1983 (United States)
- Running time: 114 minutes
- Country: United States
- Language: English
- Budget: $12 million
- Box office: $124.6 million

WarGames is a 1983 American techno-thriller film directed by John Badham, written by Lawrence Lasker and Walter F. Parkes, and starring Matthew Broderick, Dabney Coleman, John Wood and Ally Sheedy. Broderick plays David Lightman, a young computer hacker who unwittingly accesses a United States military supercomputer programmed to simulate, predict and execute nuclear war against the Soviet Union, triggering a false alarm that threatens to start World War III. Martin Brest was originally the film's director, but was fired early into production.

The film premiered at the 1983 Cannes Film Festival, and was released by MGM/UA Entertainment on June 3, 1983. It was a widespread critical and commercial success, grossing $125 million worldwide against a $12 million budget. At the 56th Academy Awards, the film was nominated for three Oscars, including Best Original Screenplay. It also won a BAFTA Award for Best Sound.

WarGames is credited with popularizing concepts of computer hacking, information technology, and cybersecurity in wider American society. It spawned several video games, a 2008 direct-to-video sequel film, and a 2018 interactive series.

== Plot ==
During a surprise nuclear attack drill, many USAF Strategic Missile Wing controllers prove unwilling to turn the keys required to launch a missile strike. Such refusals convince Dr. John McKittrick and other NORAD systems engineers that missile launch control centers must be automated, without human intervention. Control is given to a NORAD supercomputer known as WOPR (War Operation Plan Response, pronounced "whopper"), programmed to continuously run war simulations and learn over time.

David Lightman, a bright but unmotivated Seattle high school student and hacker, uses his IMSAI 8080 computer and modem to access the school district's computer system and change the grades for himself and his friend and classmate, Jennifer Mack. Later, while wardialing numbers in Sunnyvale, to find a computer game company, he connects with a system that does not identify itself. When asking for games, he finds a list that includes chess, checkers, backgammon, and poker, along with titles such as "Theaterwide Biotoxic and Chemical Warfare" and "Global Thermonuclear War", but cannot proceed further. Two hacker friends explain the concept of a backdoor password and suggest tracking down the Falken referenced in "Falken's Maze", the first game listed. David discovers that Stephen Falken was an early AI researcher, and guesses correctly that the name of Falken's deceased son (Joshua) is the password.

Unaware that the Sunnyvale phone number connects to WOPR at the high-security U.S. military installation at Cheyenne Mountain, Colorado, David initiates a game of Global Thermonuclear War, playing as the USSR while targeting American cities. The computer starts a simulation that convinces NORAD military personnel that actual Soviet nuclear missiles are inbound. The simulation is briefly interrupted when David breaks the modem connection, but WOPR nonetheless continues the simulation to trigger the scenario and win the game, as it does not understand the difference between reality and simulation. It continuously feeds false data, such as Soviet bomber incursions and submarine deployments to NORAD, prompting them to raise the DEFCON level toward retaliation that will start WWIII.

David learns the true nature of his actions from a news broadcast, and the FBI arrests him and takes him to NORAD. He realizes that WOPR is behind the NORAD alerts, but he fails to convince McKittrick that he is not working for the Soviets and is detained to await arraignment on espionage charges. David escapes NORAD by hacking the electronic door lock and joining a tourist group. With Jennifer's help, David travels to an island off the coast of Oregon where Falken lives under an assumed name. David and Jennifer find that Falken has become apathetic, believing that nuclear war is inevitable and as futile as a game of tic-tac-toe between two experienced players. The teenagers convince Falken to return to NORAD and stop WOPR.

WOPR stages a massive Soviet first strike with hundreds of missiles, submarines, and bombers. Believing the attack to be genuine, NORAD prepares to retaliate. Falken, David, and Jennifer convince military officials to delay the second strike and ride out the supposed attack until actual weapons impacts are confirmed. When the targeted American bases (Elmendorf, Grand Forks, and Loring) report back unharmed, NORAD prepares to cancel the retaliatory second strike. However, WOPR tries to launch the missiles on its own using a brute-force attack to obtain the launch codes. Without humans in the control centers as a safeguard using the two-man rule, the computer will trigger a mass launch. All attempts to log in and order WOPR to cancel the countdown fail. Disconnecting the computer is discussed and dismissed, as a fail-deadly mechanism will launch all weapons if the computer is disabled.

Falken and David direct the computer to play tic-tac-toe against itself. This results in a long string of draws, forcing the computer to learn about futility and no-win scenarios. WOPR obtains the launch codes, then cycles through all the nuclear war scenarios it has devised, finding that they all result in draws as well. Having discovered the concept of mutual assured destruction ("WINNER: NONE"), the computer tells Falken it has concluded that nuclear war is "a strange game" in which "the only winning move is not to play." WOPR relinquishes control of NORAD and the missiles and inquires, "How about a nice game of chess?"

== Cast ==
- Matthew Broderick as David Lightman
- Dabney Coleman as Dr. John McKittrick
- John Wood as Dr. Stephen Falken / WOPR (voice)
- Ally Sheedy as Jennifer Mack
- Barry Corbin as Gen. Jack Beringer
- Juanin Clay as Patricia Healy
- Dennis Lipscomb as Lyle Watson
- Kent Williams as Arthur Cabot
- Joe Dorsey as Col. Joe Conley
- Michael Ensign as Beringer's Aide
- Duncan Wilmore as Major Lem
- William Bogert as Mr. Lightman, David's father
- Susan Davis as Mrs. Lightman, David's mother
- Irving Metzman as Paul Richter
- John Spencer as Cpt. Jerry Lawson
- Michael Madsen as Lt. Steve Phelps
- Alan Blumenfeld as Mr. Liggett
- James Tolkan as Mr. Wigan
- Drew Snyder as Ayers
- Maury Chaykin as Jim Sting
- Eddie Deezen as Malvin
- Jason Bernard as Cpt. Newton
- Jesse D. Goins as Sgt. Lennon
- Stephen Lee as Sgt. Schneider
- Art LaFleur as NORAD Guard

== Production ==
=== Development ===
Development on WarGames began in 1979, when writers Walter F. Parkes and Lawrence Lasker developed an idea for a script called The Genius, about "a dying scientist and the only person in the world who understands him — a rebellious kid who's too smart for his own good". Lasker was inspired by a television special presented by Peter Ustinov on several geniuses, including Stephen Hawking. Lasker said, "I found the predicament Hawking was in fascinating — that he might one day figure out the unified field theory and not be able to tell anyone, because of his progressive ALS. So, there was this idea that he'd need a successor. And who would that be? Maybe this kid, a juvenile delinquent whose problem was that nobody realized he was too smart for his environment." The concept of computers and hacking as part of the film was not yet present.

The Genius began its transformation into WarGames when Parkes and Lasker met Peter Schwartz from the Stanford Research Institute. "There was a new subculture of extremely bright kids developing into what would become known as hackers," said Schwartz. Schwartz made the connection between youth, computers, gaming, and the military. Parkes and Lasker also met with computer-security expert Willis Ware of RAND Corporation, who assured them that even a secure military computer might have remote access enabling remote work on weekends, encouraging the screenwriters to continue with the project.

Parkes and Lasker came up with several military-themed plot lines before the final story. One version of the script had an early version of the WOPR named "Uncle Ollie", or Omnipresent Laser Interceptor (OLI), a space-based defensive laser run by an intelligent program, but this idea was discarded, because it was too speculative. Director John Badham coined the name "WOPR", feeling that the name of NORAD's Single Integrated Operational Plan was "boring, and told you nothing". The name "WOPR" played off the Whopper hamburger, and a general sense of something going "whop".

David Lightman was modeled on David Scott Lewis, a hacking enthusiast Parkes and Lasker met. Dr. Stephen Falken was inspired by and named after Stephen Hawking; John Lennon was interested in playing the role, but was murdered in New York while the script was in development. General Beringer was based on USAF General James V. Hartinger, the then-commander-in-chief of NORAD, whom Parkes and Lasker met while visiting the base.

=== Filming ===
Martin Brest was originally hired as the director for WarGames. Brest said that he spent one and a half years working full time on the film, but shortly before the beginning of production, disagreement arose between him and one of the producers who had developed the script and he was fired after three weeks of production. According to Brest the disagreement stemmed from a question about authorial control. As Brest described it, the producer was more used to television "where the director is a bricklayer, essentially".

He was then replaced with John Badham. Several of the scenes shot by Brest remain in the final film. Badham said that Brest had "taken a somewhat dark approach to the story and the way it was shot. It was like [Broderick and Sheedy] were doing some Nazi undercover thing, so it was my job to make it seem like they were having fun, and that it was exciting." According to Badham, Broderick and Sheedy were "stiff as boards" when they came onto the sound stage, having both Brest's dark vision and the idea that they would soon be fired. Badham did 12 to 14 takes of the first shot to loosen the actors up. At one point, Badham decided to race with the two actors around the sound stage, with the one who came last having to sing a song to the crew. Badham lost and sang "The Happy Wanderer", the silliest song he could think of. He invited what Wired described as "a small army of computer whizzes on set" to advise on accuracy.

Tom Mankiewicz says he wrote some additional scenes during shooting that were used. Walon Green was also an uncredited script doctor.

=== Design ===
The WOPR computer, as seen in the film, was a prop created in Culver City, California, by members of the International Alliance of Theatrical Stage Employees Local 44. It was designed by production designer (credited as a visual consultant) Geoffrey Kirkland on the basis of some pictures he had of early tabulating machines, and metal furniture, consoles, and cabinets used particularly in the U.S. military in the 1940s and 1950s. Art director Angelo P. Graham adapted them in drawings and concepts. The WOPR was operated by a crewmember sitting inside the computer, entering commands into an Apple II at the director's instruction. The prop was broken up for scrap after production was completed. A replica was built for a 2006 AT&T commercial.

== Release ==
WarGames did well at the box office, grossing $79,567,667, the fifth-highest of 1983 in the United States and Canada. It grossed $45 million internationally for a worldwide total of $124.6 million.

The film was screened out of competition at the 1983 Cannes Film Festival.

== Reception ==
=== Critical response ===
==== Contemporaneous ====
Roger Ebert gave WarGames four out of four stars, calling it "an amazingly entertaining thriller" and "one of the best films so far this year", with a "wonderful" ending. Robert Denerstein of the Rocky Mountain News gave it three stars, writing that "for a long time, Badham sustains a playful mood, a combination of Hardy Boys enthusiasm, good-natured humor and high-tech adventure", but he said that he "found [himself] seriously let down by the fact that the adults don't seem to ask the obvious questions and thorny spots in the script are so conveniently resolved that the movie deteriorates in retrospect." Leonard Maltin gave it a mixed review calling it "Fail Safe for the Pac-Man Generation" and "Entertaining to a point". He concluded, "Incidentally, it's easy to see why this was so popular with kids: most of the adults in the film are boobs."

American fiction writer Robert Bloch, author of Psycho, reviewed WarGames for Starlog magazine in 1983. Bloch was generally complimentary of the film, writing, "Let me say, up front, that WarGames is an outstanding film. Its production values are impressive. Its script, direction, editing and cinematography are deft. The performances of Matthew Broderick as David and Ally Sheedy as Jennifer are outstanding.” However, although Bloch wrote, “I accept WarGames as an entertaining fantasy," he added, "...I cannot accept the unchallenged notion that there’s anything ‘heroic’ about a young man who devotes his skills to totally immoral and amoral ends; who seems to think that lying and cheating are merely part of a ‘game’ which all intelligent human beings must play in order to get a free ride through life at others’ expense.”

Computer Gaming World stated that "Wargames is plausible enough to intrigue and terrifying enough to excite ... [it] makes one think, as well as feel, all the way", raised several moral questions about technology and society, and recommended the film to "Computer hobbyists of all kinds". Softline described the film as being "completely original"; unlike other computer-related films like Tron that "could (and do) exist in substantially the same form with some other plot", WarGames "could not exist if the microcomputer did not exist ... It takes the micro and telecommunications as a given—part of the middle-class American landscape." The magazine praised the film as "Very funny, excruciatingly suspenseful, and endlessly inventive, this movie is right on the mark; authentic even when highly improbable." Christopher John in Ares Magazine commented that "The movie cloaked itself in a standard message, but then set out to take something we have seen many times before and retell it in a new, interesting fashion. War Games is highly entertaining, fast-moving, colorful, and mentally stimulating." Colin Greenland in Imagine stated that "Wargames is a tense, tight film, sharply acted, funny, sane, and with a plot twist for every chilling sub-routine in WOPR's scenarios for World War III."

==== Retrospective ====
On Rotten Tomatoes, WarGames received an approval rating of 94% based on 47 reviews, with an average rating of 7.60/10. The site's critical consensus reads, "Part delightfully tense techno-thriller, part refreshingly unpatronizing teen drama, WarGames is one of the more inventive—and genuinely suspenseful—Cold War movies of the 1980s." On Metacritic, the film has a weighted average score of 77 out of 100 based on 15 critics, indicating "generally favorable reviews".

== Accolades ==
WarGames was nominated for three Academy Awards: Best Cinematography (William A. Fraker), Sound (Michael J. Kohut, Carlos Delarios, Aaron Rochin, Willie D. Burton), and Writing, Screenplay Written Directly for the Screen (Lawrence Lasker, Walter F. Parkes). The company that provided the large video wall used to display the tactical situations seen in the NORAD set employed a new design that was super-bright, enabling the displays to be filmed live. (The set was more visually impressive than the actual NORAD facilities at the time.) The animations seen on the NORAD displays, produced by Colin Cantwell, were created using Hewlett Packard HP 9845C computers driving monochrome HP 1345A vector displays, which were still-filmed through successive color-filters. Each frame took approximately one minute to produce, and 50,000 feet of negatives were produced over seven months. The animations were projected "live" onto the screens from behind using 16 mm film, so they were visible to the actors and no post-production work was needed.

=== List of awards and nominations ===
Award	Year	Category	Nominee	Result
Academy Award	1984	Best Original Screenplay	Lawrence Lasker, Walter F. Parkes	Nominated
Academy Award	1984	Best Cinematography	William A. Fraker	Nominated
Academy Award	1984	Best Sound	Michael J. Kohut, Carlos Delarios, Aaron Rochin, Willie D. Burton	Nominated
American Cinema Editors Award	1984	Best Edited Feature Film – Dramatic	Tom Rolf	Won
British Academy Film Award	1984	Best Production Design	Angelo P. Graham	Nominated
British Academy Film Award	1984	Best Special Visual Effects	Michael L. Fink, Joe Digaetano, Jack Cooperman, Don Hansard, Colin Cantwell, William A. Fraker	Nominated
British Academy Film Award	1984	Best Sound	Michael J. Kohut, Willie D. Burton, William Manger	Won
Hugo Award	1984	Best Dramatic Presentation	John Badham, Lawrence Lasker, Walter F. Parkes	Nominated
Saturn Award	1984	Best Science Fiction Film	WarGames	Nominated
Saturn Award	1984	Best Director	John Badham	Won
Saturn Award	1984	Best Writing	Lawrence Lasker, Walter F. Parkes	Nominated
Saturn Award	1984	Best Actor	Matthew Broderick	Nominated
Saturn Award	1984	Best Actress	Ally Sheedy	Nominated
Saturn Award	1984	Best Supporting Actor	John Wood	Nominated
Writers Guild of America Award	1984	Best Original Screenplay	Lawrence Lasker, Walter F. Parkes	Nominated
Young Artist Award	1984	Best Family Feature Motion Picture	WarGames	Nominated
Young Artist Award	1984	Best Young Motion Picture Actress in a Feature Film	Ally Sheedy	Nominated

== Influence ==
WarGames was the first mass-consumed, visual medium with the central theme of remote computing as well as hacking, and it served as both an amplifier vehicle and framework for America's earliest discussion of information technology.

When The 414s hacker group penetrated systems at Los Alamos National Laboratory later in 1983, news media described the affair as "the 'WarGames' case" and speculated about the potential for the film's scenario to exist in reality.

President Ronald Reagan, a family friend of Lasker's, watched the film and discussed the plot with members of Congress, his advisers, and the Joint Chiefs of Staff. Reagan ordered a full national security review. Within a week, the Joint Chiefs of Staff returned an answer: "Yes, the premise was technically possible". Reagan's interest in the film is credited with leading to the enactment 18 months later of NSDD-145, the first Presidential directive on computer security.

Bulletin board system (BBS) operators reported an unusual rise in activity in 1984, which at least one sysop attributed to WarGames introducing viewers to modems. The scenes showing Lightman's computer dialing every number in Sunnyvale led to the term "wardialing" (earlier known as "demon dialing"), a technique of using a modem to scan a list of telephone numbers in search of unknown computers, and indirectly to the newer term, "wardriving".

The film also led to the first U.S. federal internet policy: the Computer Fraud and Abuse Act of 1986.

== Related media ==
=== Novelization ===
A novelization of the film was written by David Bischoff.

=== Sequel ===
In November 2006, pre-production began on a sequel, titled WarGames: The Dead Code. It was directed by Stuart Gillard, and starred Matt Lanter as a hacker named Will Farmer facing off with a government supercomputer called RIPLEY. MGM released the sequel directly to DVD on July 29, 2008, along with the 25th Anniversary Edition DVD of WarGames. To promote the sequel, the original film returned to selected theaters as a one-night-only 25th-anniversary event on July 24, 2008.

=== Video games ===
A video game, WarGames, was released for the ColecoVision in 1983 and ported to the Atari 8-bit computers and Commodore 64 in 1984. It plays similarly to the NORAD side of the "Global Thermonuclear War" game, where the United States has to be defended from a Soviet strike by placing bases and weapons at strategic points. WarGames: Defcon 1, a real-time strategy game only loosely related to the film, was released for the PlayStation and PC in 1998.

A game inspired by the film, called "Computer War" from Thorn EMI, in which the player must track and shoot down intercontinental ballistic missiles, as well as crack a computer code, was released for the Atari 8-bit, TI-99/4A, and VIC-20 in 1984. The same year, Australian developer Gameworx released Thermonuclear Wargames, an illustrated text adventure in which the player must stop a NORDAD computer called M.A.S.T.A. from initiating World War III.

The film also inspired the Introversion game DEFCON (2006).

Be-Rad Entertainment released a tile-matching video game, "WarGames: WOPR", for iOS and Android devices in 2012.

=== Interactive series ===
An interactive media reboot of WarGames was announced by MGM in 2015, with Interlude serving as its co-production company. The project was described as an "audience-driven story experience", with anticipated launch in 2016. In March 2016, Sam Barlow announced he had joined Interlude and would be serving as a creative lead in the series, on the basis of his work from his video game, "Her Story", which required the player to piece together a mystery based on a series of video clips. Interlude rebranded itself as Eko in December 2016, and the six-episode series was released in March 2018.

== Soundtrack ==
The film's music was composed and conducted by Arthur B. Rubinstein, and performed by the Hollywood Studio Symphony. A soundtrack album including songs and dialogue excerpts was released by Polydor Records. Intrada Records issued an expanded release in 2008 with the complete score, with expanded horn sections and without the film dialogue. In 2018, Quartet Records issued a 35th anniversary expanded 2-CD edition containing the score as presented in the film, and the 1983 Polydor album on disc 2.

WarGames (Original Motion Picture Soundtrack) (The Beepers ("Video Fever" and "History Lesson"): Brian Banks, Anthony Marinelli, Cynthia Morrow and Arthur B. Rubinstein)

- Released: 1983
- Format: Vinyl/LP/Album/Cassette
- Label: United Artists / Polydor Records – 422–815 005-1 Y-1
- Writer: Arthur B. Rubinstein
- Producer: Ron Eyre, George Craig
- Tracks: Crosby, Stills & Nash rendition of "WarGames" released on Allies (1983)

WarGames (Special Collection release limited to 2500 copies. Expanded brass including extra trumpets, trombones, and baritone horns.)

- Released: 1983 (2008)
- Format: LP/2 disk CD
- Label: Intrada Special Collection Volume ISC 65
- Writer: Arthur B. Rubinstein
- Bonus tracks: "Two" Bonus Track Time = 3:39 – Total Score Time = 65:49 – Total Time: 69:18

== Legacy ==
Critics have cited the film as an influence on Mamoru Hosoda's 2000 short film Digimon Adventure: Our War Game!, with critic Geoffrey G. Thew, writing in Anime Impact: The Movies and Shows that Changed the World of Japanese Animation, noting that both films share a title and a plot of "a rogue AI hijacking the Internet to spread chaos and potentially destroy the world, only to be stopped by some kids on their computers." Hosoda later stated that Our War Game "kind of started my idea for [his 2009 film] Summer Wars," noting that Summer Wars "became the feature-length version of that idea" and allowed him to explore material he was unable to in Our War Game's 40 minute runtime.

== See also ==
- 1983 Soviet nuclear false alarm incident, which occurred a few months after the release
