= Her Story (video game) =

2015 video game

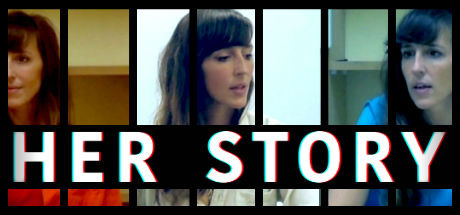
- Developer: Sam Barlow
- Publisher: Sam Barlow
- Engine: Unity
- Platforms: iOS; OS X; Windows; Android
- Release: iOS, OS X, Windows; 24 June 2015; Android; 25 June 2016
- Genre: Interactive film
- Mode: Single-player

Her Story is an interactive film video game written and directed by Sam Barlow. It was released on 24 June 2015 for iOS, OS X, and Windows, and the following year for Android. In the game, the player searches and sorts through a database of video clips from fictional police interviews, and uses the clips to solve the case of a missing man. The police interviews focus on the man's wife, Hannah Smith, portrayed by British musician Viva Seifert.

The game is Barlow's first project since his departure from Climax Studios, after which he became independent. He wanted to develop a game that was dependent on the narrative, and avoided working on the game until he was settled on an idea that was possible to execute. Barlow eventually decided to create a police procedural game, and incorporate live action footage. He conducted research for the game by watching existing police interviews. Upon doing so, he discovered recurring themes in the suspects' answers, and decided to incorporate ambiguity to the investigation in the game.

Her Story was acclaimed by many reviewers, with praise particularly directed at the narrative, unconventional gameplay mechanics, and Seifert's performance. The game has sold over 100,000 copies, and earned multiple year-end accolades, including nominations for Game of the Year awards from several gaming publications. In August 2019, a spiritual sequel titled Telling Lies was released.

== Gameplay ==
Her Story is an interactive movie game, focusing on a series of seven fictional police interviews from 1994. As the game begins, the player is presented with an old desktop, which contains several files and programs. Among the programs are instructional text files, which explain the game's mechanics. One of the programs automatically open on the desktop is the "L.O.G.I.C. Database", which allows the player to search and sort video clips within the database, of which there are 271. The video clips are police interviews with Hannah Smith, a British woman. The interviews are unable to be watched in their entirety, forcing the player to view short clips. In the interviews, Hannah answers unknown questions to an off-screen detective, prompting the player to decipher the context of the answers. Hannah's answers are transcribed, and the player can find clips by searching in the database for words from the transcriptions, attempting to solve the case by piecing together information. As the player selects clips, they can enter user tags, which are then available as searchable terms. One of the files on the desktop is a database checker, which allows the player to review the number of clips that have been viewed; as a clip is viewed, the red box in the database checker changes to green. The desktop also features the minigame Mirror Game, based on the strategy board game Reversi.

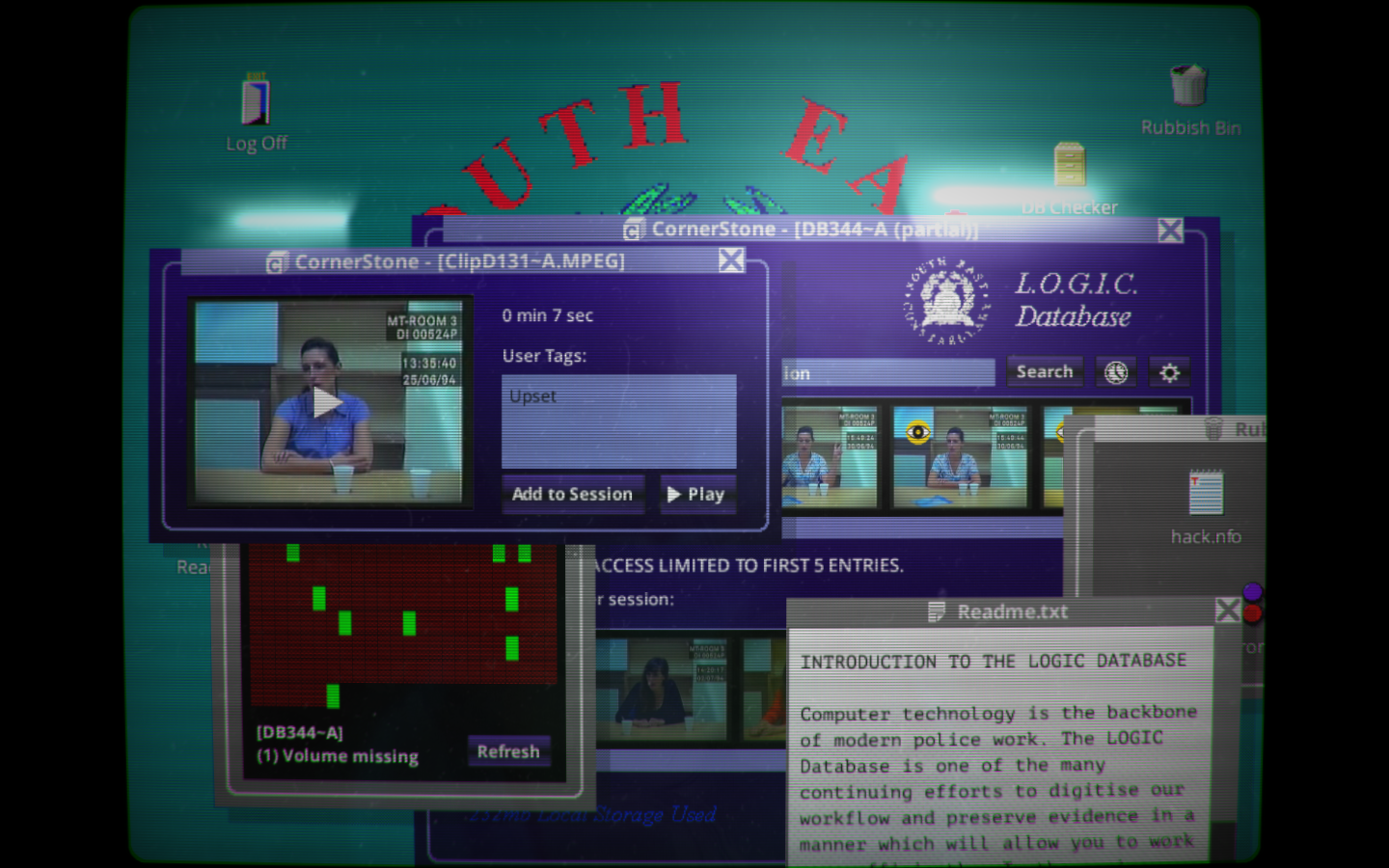
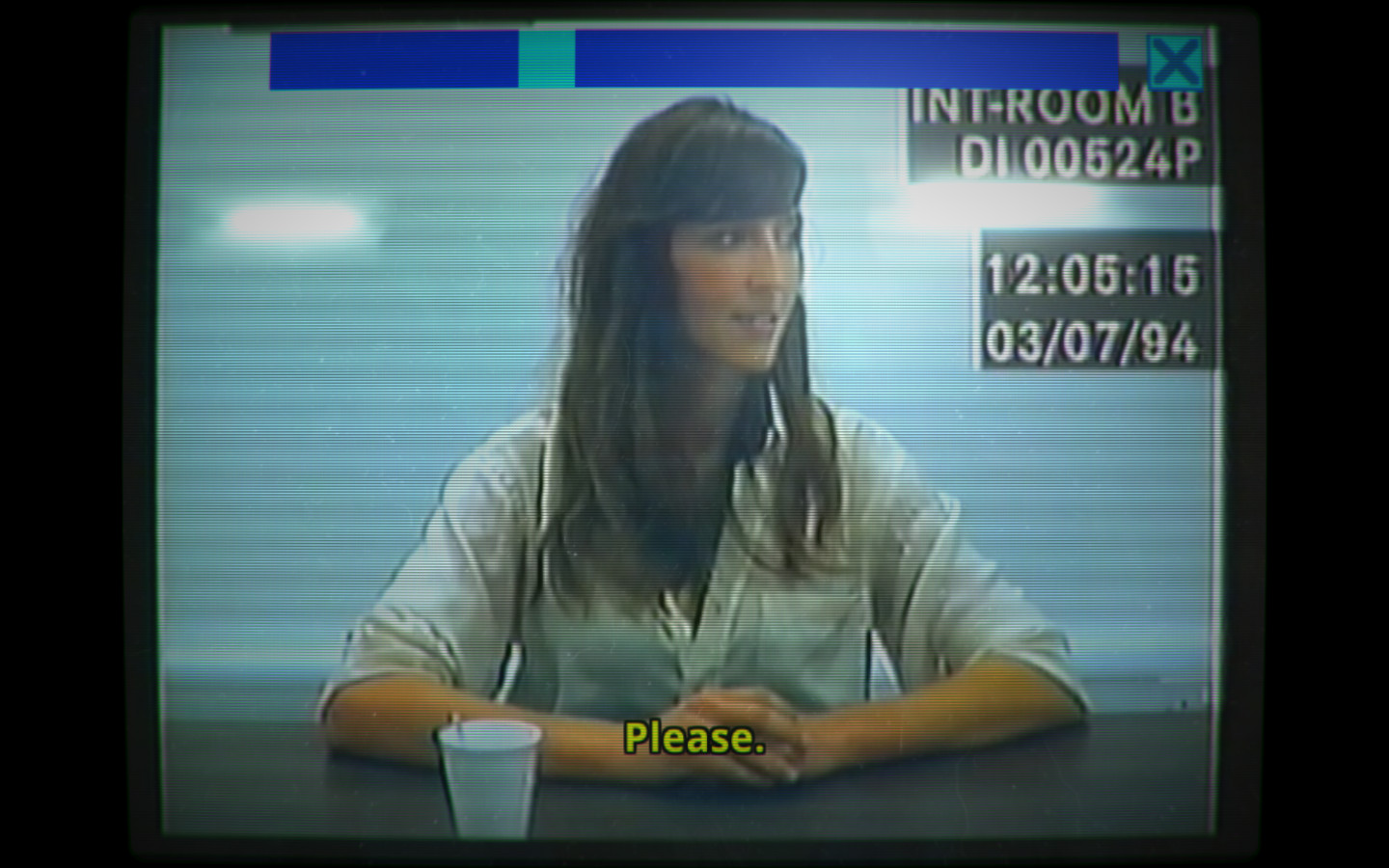
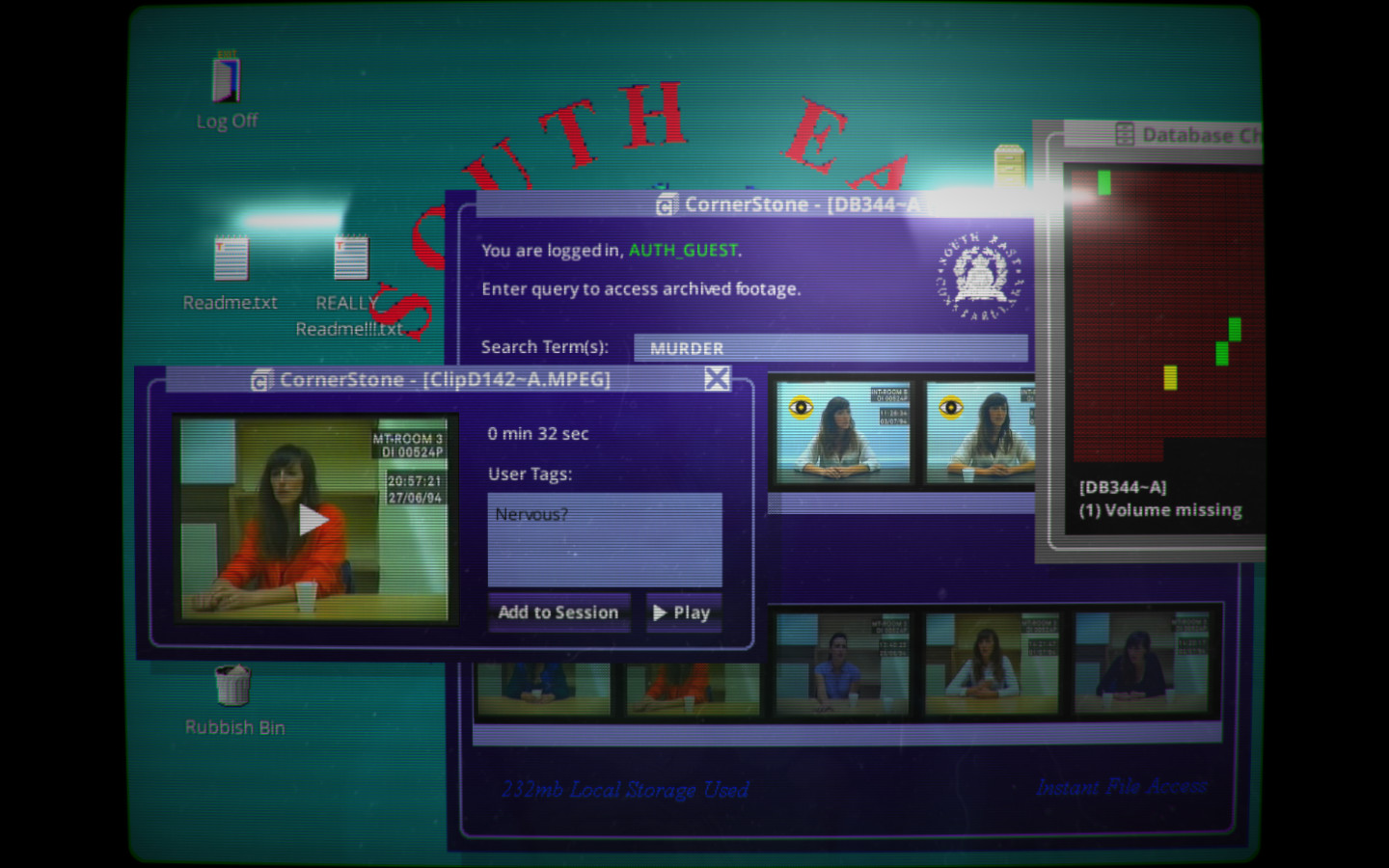
In Her Story, the player sorts through video clips from a set of fictional police interviews to solve the case of a murdered man.

== Plot ==
The interview tapes feature a woman who introduces herself as Hannah Smith (portrayed by Viva Seifert), whose husband, Simon, has gone missing and is later found murdered. Hannah admits that she and Simon had argued, but has an alibi placing her in Glasgow when Simon disappeared. As more pieces of the interviews are discovered, it is claimed that "Hannah" is actually two women: Hannah and Eve, identical twins separated at birth by the midwife, Florence. Florence desperately wanted to have kids but did not believe in remarrying after her husband died, so she faked Eve's death to claim the baby for herself. Florence deliberately kept Eve indoors as much as possible and the twins were unaware of each other's existence until years later. When Florence died, Eve secretly moved in with Hannah and they decided to act as a single person, keeping a common diary and a set of rules defining their actions as "Hannah". Hannah's parents were oblivious, assuming Eve was Hannah's imaginary friend.

Hannah eventually began dating Simon, whom she had met at a glazier where they both worked. Despite their rules to share equally, Hannah slept with Simon and became pregnant. She gradually became possessive of Simon and forbade Eve from interacting with him. Because of the pregnancy, Hannah and Simon were married and moved in together while Eve moved out to her own apartment and began wearing a wig. Hannah miscarried in her eighth month and believed she was infertile afterward. Some time later, Simon encountered Eve in a bar she was singing at. Smitten by her resemblance, the two began an affair. Eve became pregnant but never told Simon and hid the identity of the father from Hannah.

On their birthday, after Simon gifted Hannah a handmade mirror, she revealed the existence of Eve and her pregnancy. Hannah realised Simon was the father of Eve's child. After kicking Simon out of the house, she argued with Eve over the affair, causing the latter to leave for Glasgow. Simon returned and, thinking Hannah was Eve, gifted her a similar handmade mirror and professed his desire to be with Eve instead of Hannah. Hannah became furious and revealed her identity. She later claims that, as they fought, she shattered the mirror and inadvertently cut Simon's throat with it while fending him off. When Eve returned, she found Hannah sitting next to Simon's lifeless body. Agreeing that Eve's baby was the priority, they hid Simon's body and agreed to use Eve's trip to Glasgow as an alibi.

At the end of the final interview, Eve says that Hannah is "gone ... and she's never coming back" but mockingly asks "can you arrest someone who doesn't exist?". She then requests a lawyer, and says that her comments are just "stories". It is unclear if Eve's story of being an identical twin is true, an intentional fabrication meant to confuse the police, or a case of dissociative identity disorder, with pieces of evidence lending credence to each theory. As the player uncovers enough of the story, a chat window appears asking if they are finished. Upon answering affirmatively, it is revealed that the player is Sarah, Eve's daughter. The chat asks Sarah if she understands her mother's actions, and asks to meet her outside.

== Development ==
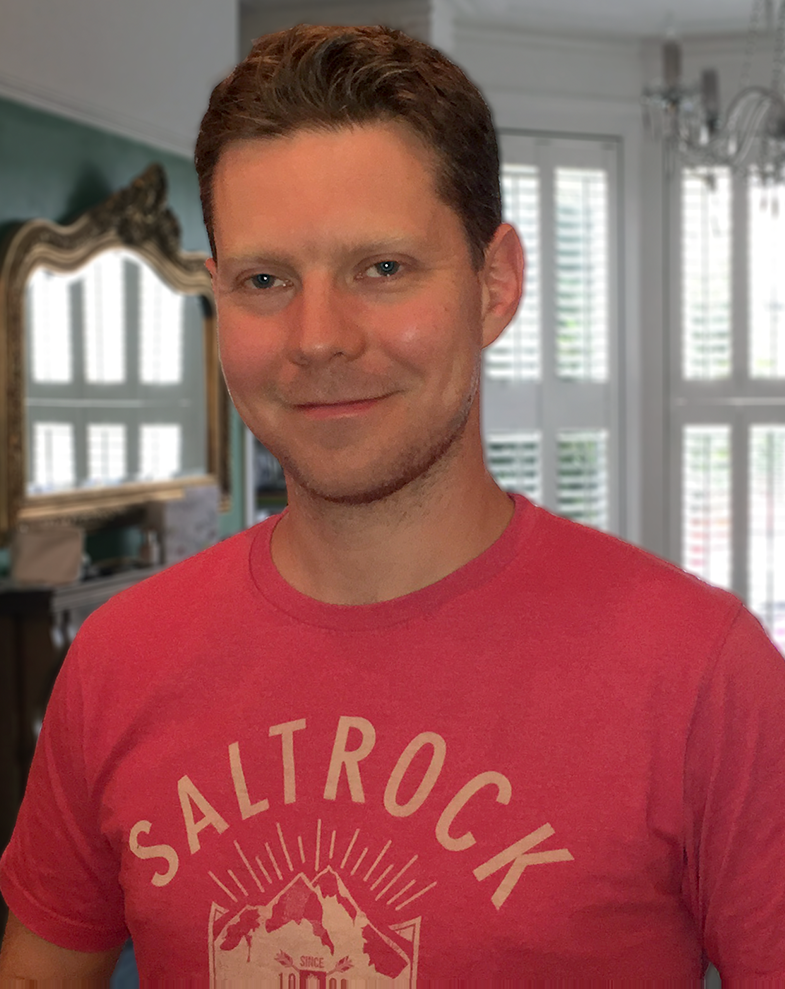
Sam Barlow left Climax Studios and became an independent developer to work on Her Story.

Her Story was developed by Sam Barlow, who previously worked on games such as Silent Hill: Origins (2007) and Silent Hill: Shattered Memories (2009) at Climax Studios. Barlow had conceived the idea of a police procedural game while working at Climax Studios, but decided to become independent to create the game, in order to develop a game that is "deep on story". He became frustrated by publishers rejecting game pitches for being "too kitchen sink [realism]" in favor of video game tropes like a "cyborg assassin from the future", and found that becoming independent allowed him to create his own game of the sort. He also wished to become independent after playing games like Year Walk (2013) and 80 Days (2014). Barlow avoided development until he had an idea that was possible to execute. "I could probably quite easily have gone and made an exploration horror game ... but I kind of knew that there would be big compromises there because of budget," he said. Barlow spent his savings to work on the game, allowing him a year of development time. He followed through with the concept of Her Story, as it focused on an "intimate setting, dialogue and character interaction", which he found was often dismissed in larger titles. Barlow felt particularly inspired to develop Her Story after seeing the continuous support of his 1999 game Aisle. When referring to how Her Story challenges typical game conventions, Barlow compares it to the Dogme 95 filmmaking movement, and Alfred Hitchcock's 1948 film Rope.

Her Story was approved through Steam Greenlight, and was crowdfunded by Indie Fund. It was released on 24 June 2015 for iOS, OS X, and Windows. Barlow wanted to launch the game on all platforms simultaneously, as he was unsure where the audience would be. "If I'd just gone for just one I'd have lost a lot of the potential audience," he commented. Barlow found that playing Her Story on mobile devices is a "'sofa' experience". He also noted that it felt "natural" for it to be released on mobile devices, as they are regularly used to watch videos and search the internet; similar tasks are used as gameplay mechanics in Her Story. The iPhone's smaller pixel size of 640×480 as opposed to 800×600 led to Barlow's doubts of a release on the platform, but he was influenced to release it upon receiving positive feedback through testing. As development neared completion, the game underwent testing, which allowed Barlow to "balance some aspects" and "polish items together". An Android version was released on 29 June 2016. Her Story runs on the Unity game engine.

=== Gameplay design ===
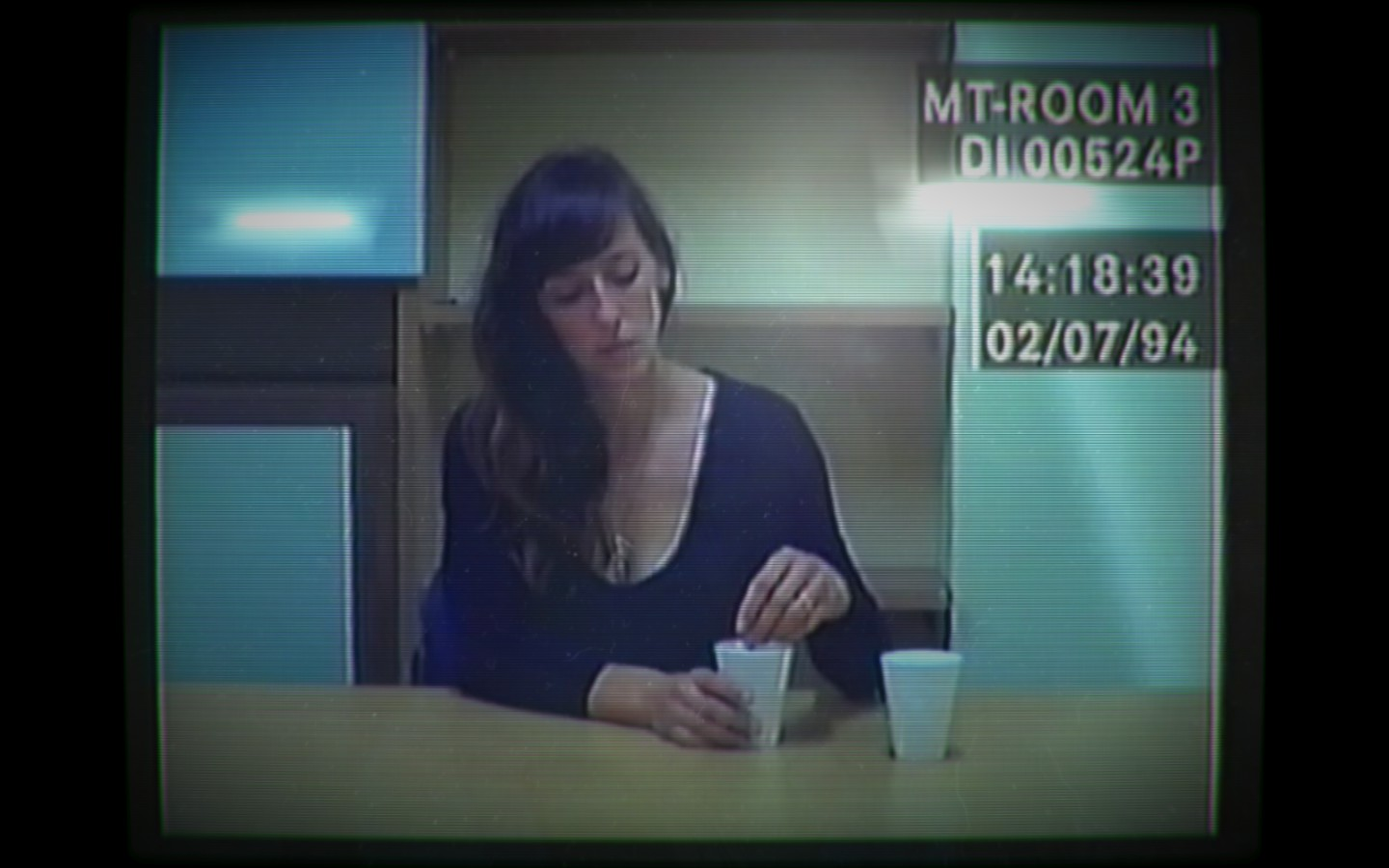
Barlow decided to implement live action footage into the game after becoming frustrated with the technical challenge of translating an actor's performance into a game engine.

Barlow described the game as a "desktop thriller". His immediate idea was to create a game involving police interviews, but he "didn't know exactly what that meant". He then conceived the idea to involve real video footage, and the ability to access the footage through a database interface; he described the interface as being "part Apple II, part Windows 3.1 and part Windows 98". The interface design was inspired by Barlow's appreciation of the police procedural genre, commenting that "the conceit of making the computer itself a prop in the game was so neat". He also compared the searching mechanic to the Google search engine, and wanted to "run with the idea" that the player is "essentially Googling". The game's concept was inspired by the TV series Homicide: Life on the Street (1993–1999), which Barlow found depicted police interviews being a "gladiatorial arena for detectives". Barlow intentionally made the game's opening screen to be "slightly too long", to immediately notify the player of the slow pacing that would follow.

Inspiration to work on Her Story stemmed from Barlow's disappointment of other detectives games: he felt that L.A. Noire (2011) never allowed him to feel like "the awesome detective who was having to read things and follow up threads of investigation", and he called the Ace Attorney series (2001–present) "rigid". When Barlow began development on Her Story, he added more typical game aspects, but the game mechanics became more minimalist as development progressed. The initial plan for the game was for the player to work towards a definitive resolution, ultimately solving the crime. However, when Barlow tested the concept on pre-existing interview transcripts of convicted murderer Christopher Porco, he began to discover themes surfacing within the interviews, particularly relating to the concept of money, which was ultimately a large factor in Porco's trial. He took this concept of recurring themes and threads, and decided to "move beyond the clearly scripted stuff" when developing Her Story. Barlow felt that the story's appeal was the ambiguity of the investigation, comparing Her Story to the podcast Serial (2014–present), which he listened to late in development. He found that the attraction of Serial was the lack of a definitive solution, noting that "people lean towards certain interpretations ... what makes it interesting is the extent to which it lives on in your imagination".

=== Story and characters ===
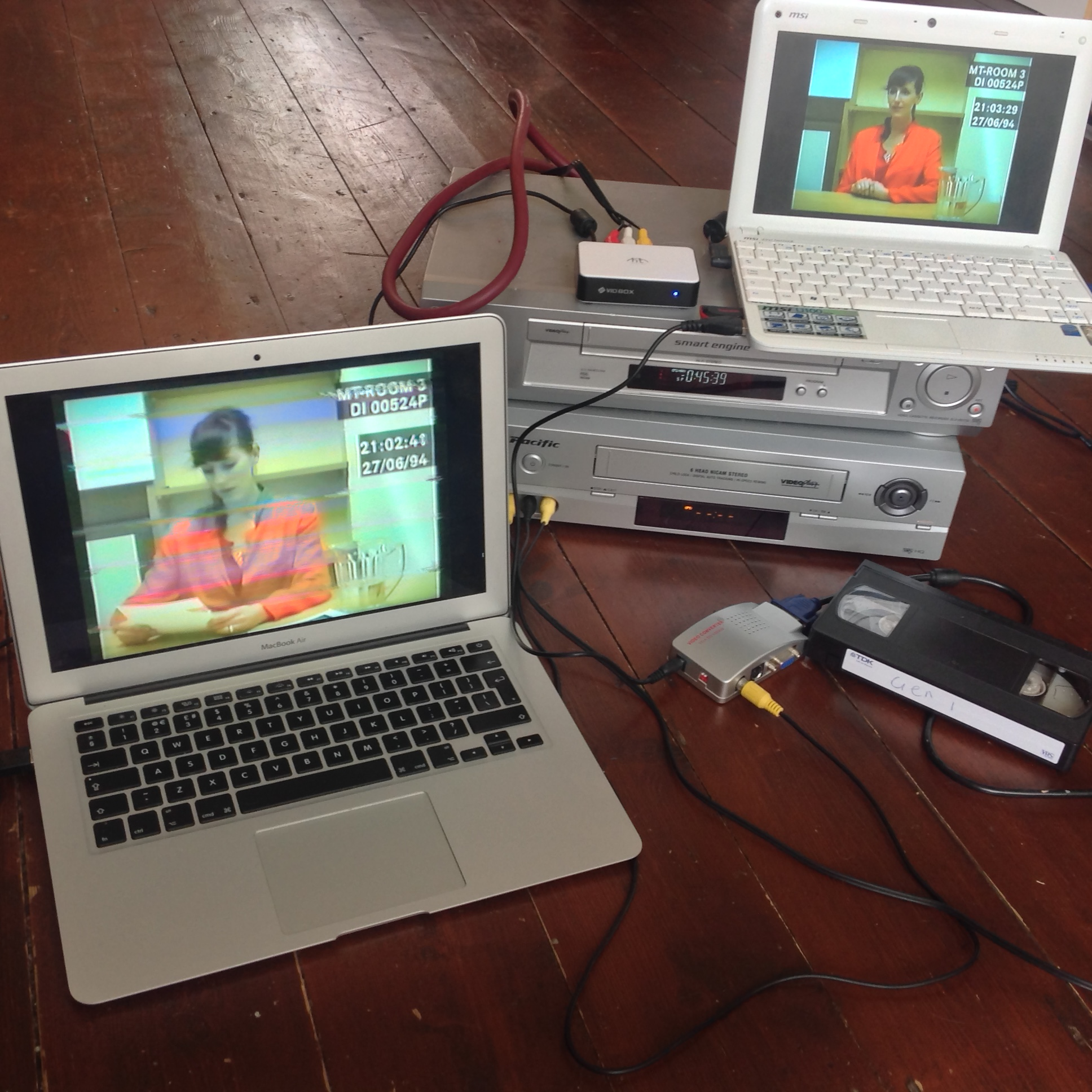
After the filming was complete, Barlow ran the footage through two VHS players, to make it resemble video from the time period of 1994.

Barlow decided to feature live action footage in the game after becoming frustrated with his previous projects, particularly with the technical challenge of translating an actor's performance into a game engine. Barlow set out to work with an actor on Her Story, having enjoyed the process while working at Climax Studios, albeit with a larger budget. He contacted Viva Seifert, whom he had intermittently worked with on Legacy of Kain: Dead Sun for a year, before its cancellation. He felt that Seifert is "very good at picking up a line and intuitively pulling a lot of the subtext into her performance", which led him to believe that she was "perfect" for the role in Her Story. When Barlow asked Seifert to audition, he sent her a 300-page script, which he managed to reduce to 80 pages, by altering font size, as well as some dialogue; she accepted the role.

Seifert began to feel pressure midway through filming, when she realised that "the whole game is hinging" on her performance. She described the shoot as "intense" and "rather exhausting", and felt as if she was "subtly being scrutinised" by Barlow, which helped her performance. Barlow also felt that the intensity helped Seifert's performance, taking cues from director Alfred Hitchcock, who would upset his actors in order to achieve the greatest performance. Seifert felt that there were small nuances in her performance that may have "added some twists and turns" for the player that Barlow had not anticipated. The game's seven police interviews were filmed roughly in chronological order over five days, in a process that Barlow called "natural". Like Seifert though, Barlow thought the shoot was intense, remarking "at the end of the shoot, it was just a huge relief it was all over and we hadn't forgotten to record or anything." Barlow travelled to Seifert's home county of Cornwall to film. He felt that finding the locations for the interrogation rooms was the simplest part of production, because "everywhere has crappy looking rooms", with footage being recorded in a council building in Truro. When filming was complete, Barlow wanted to give the impression that the videos had been recorded in 1994, but found digital filters were unable to capture this time frame appropriately. Instead, he recorded the footage through two VHS players to create imperfections in the video before digitising the video into the game.

Barlow played the part of the detectives during filming, asking scripted questions to Seifert's character, but is never featured in Her Story. When watching police interviews for research, Barlow found himself empathising with the interviewee, which inspired him to exclude the detective from the game. He stated that the interviews typically feature "double betrayal", in which the detectives are "pretending to be the best friend". Barlow felt that removing the detective from the game empowers Seifert's character, allowing the player to empathise. When conducting research for Her Story, Barlow looked at the case regarding the murder of Travis Alexander, which made him consider the manner that female murder suspects are treated in interrogations, stating that they "tend to be fetishised, more readily turned into archetypes". This was further proved to Barlow when studying the interviews of Casey Anthony and Amanda Knox; he found that media commentary often ignored the evidence of the investigation, instead focusing on the expressions of the suspects during the interviews. Barlow conducted further research by studying texts about psychology, and the use of language.

After conceiving the game's main mechanics, Barlow began developing the story, conducting research and "letting [the story] take on a life of its own". To develop the story, Barlow placed the script into a spreadsheet, which became so large it often crashed his laptop upon opening it. He mapped out every character involved in the investigation, including their backstories and agendas. He spent about half of development creating detailed documents charting the story's characters and events. He also determined the dates on which the police interviews would take place, and what the suspect was doing in the interim. Once he had determined the game's concept more precisely, Barlow ensured the script contained "layers of intrigue", in order to interest the player to finish the game. Barlow often replaced words of the script with synonyms, to ensure that some clips were not associated with irrelevant words. When writing the script, Barlow generally avoided supernatural themes, but realised that it would involve a "slight dreamlike surreal edge". Working on the script, he often found that he was "very much in the moment, writing from inside the characters' heads". He found it difficult to create a new idea for the story, as detective fiction has been explored many times before.

"The 49th Street Galleria"
Chris Zabriskie's "The 49th Street Galleria" was used as the game's opening theme.

"That Kid in Fourth Grade Who Really Liked the Denver Broncos"
"That Kid in Fourth Grade Who Really Liked the Denver Broncos", composed by Zabriskie, was used in the game's closing credits.

=== Audio ===
When searching for music to use in Her Story, Barlow looked for songs that sounded "slightly out-of-time". He ultimately used eight tracks from musician Chris Zabriskie, and found that his music invoked nostalgia, and had a "modern edge". He felt that the music "highlights the gap between the 'fake computer world'" and the game. The "emotional intensity" of the clips also influences the music changes in Her Story. Barlow also intended to feature a song for Seifert to sing in some of the clips that fit within the game. He settled on the murder ballad "The Twa Sisters", which he felt would trigger the mythical elements of the game. Seifert and Barlow both altered the ballad, to fit the game. Barlow intended for the sound design to be "all about authenticity". He used an old keyboard to provide sound effects for the computer, using stereo panning for the keys to have the correct 3D position in playback.

=== Sequel ===
Telling Lies was Barlow's spiritual sequel to Her Story; rather than focusing on one central character, it features live-action footage from the video conversations of four characters (played by Logan Marshall-Green, Alexandra Shipp, Kerry Bishé, and Angela Sarafyan), and requires the player to piece together events by searching the video clips to determine why these characters were under surveillance. The game was published by Annapurna Interactive on Windows and macOS systems on 23 August 2019.

== Reception ==
=== Critical reception ===
Reception

Aggregate score
| Aggregator | Score |
|---|---|
| Metacritic | (iOS) 91/100 (PC) 86/100 |

Review scores
| Publication | Score |
|---|---|
| Adventure Gamers | 4/5 |
| Destructoid | 10/10 |
| Edge | 9/10 |
| Game Informer | 8.5/10 |
| GameSpot | 8/10 |
| Giant Bomb | 4/5 |
| IGN | 8.5/10 |
| PC Gamer (US) | 90/100 |
| Polygon | 8.5/10 |
| VideoGamer.com | 8/10 |

Her Story received "universal acclaim" for the iOS and "generally favorable" reviews for Windows, according to review aggregator website Metacritic. Praise was directed at the narrative, gameplay mechanics, and Seifert's performance. IGN's Brian Albert called Her Story "the most unique game I've played in years", and Steven Burns of VideoGamer.com named it "one of the year's best and most interesting games". Adam Smith of Rock, Paper, Shotgun remarked that it "might be the best FMV game ever made"; Michael Thomsen of The Washington Post declared it "a beautiful amalgam of the cinema and video game formats".

Critics lauded the game's narrative. Edge considered it "a superlatively told work of crime fiction." Kimberley Wallace of Game Informer wrote that the "fragmented" delivery of the story "works to its benefit". She appreciated the subtlety of the narrative, and the ambiguity surrounding the ending. Polygon's Megan Farokhmanesh noted that Her Story "nails the dark, voyeuristic nature of true crime". Chris Schilling of The Daily Telegraph was impressed by the coherence of the narrative, "even when presented out of order". Eurogamer's Simon Parkin found the effects of the narrative to be similar to well-received HBO thrillers, particularly in terms of audience attention. Stephanie Bendixsen of Good Game was disappointed that large plot points were revealed early in the game, but attributed this to the uniqueness of each player's experience.

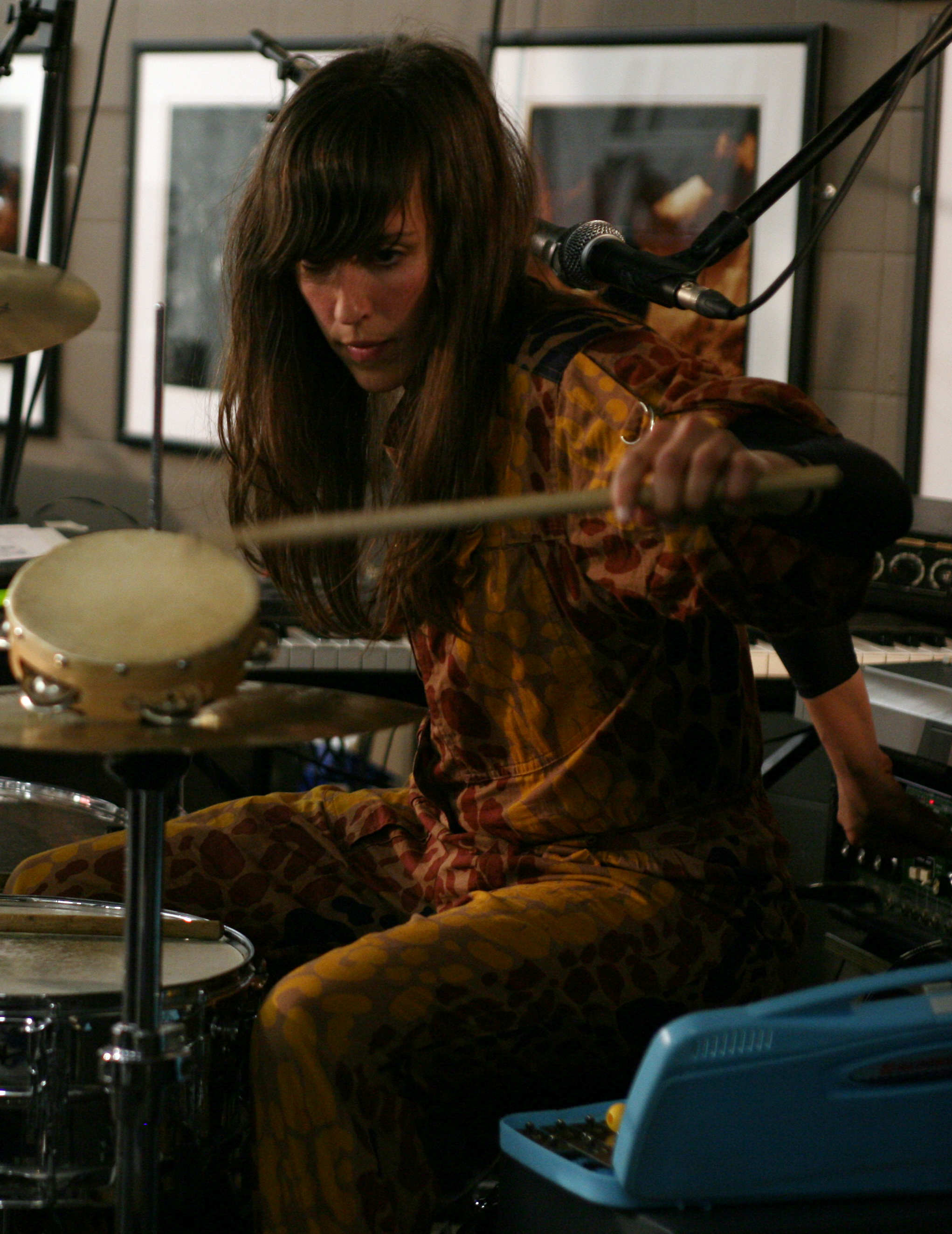
Musician Viva Seifert's performance as the lead character was praised by critics.

Seifert's performance in the game received praise. GameSpot's Justin Clark felt that the performance "anchored" the game. Chris Kohler of Wired similarly described Seifert's performance as "so captivating that I couldn't imagine this game working any other way". Katie Smith of Adventure Gamers wrote that Seifert is convincing in the role, particularly with small details such as body language, but was startled by the lack of emotion. Game Informer's Wallace echoed similar remarks, noting that Seifert "nailed the role". Rock, Paper, Shotgun's Smith wrote that "the whole thing might collapse" without Seifert's "convincing" performance. IGN's Albert named the acting "believable", stating that Seifert's performance is "appropriately both grounded and absurd". Joe Donnelly of Digital Spy wrote that Seifert's performance has the potential to inspire similar games, and Andy Kelly of PC Gamer called the performance "understated, realistic, and complex". Burns of VideoGamer.com felt generally impressed by Seifert's performance, but noted some "occasional bad acting". Rich Stanton of The Guardian wrote that "Seifert's delivery is usually matter-of-fact and emotionally convincing". Polygon named Hannah among the best video game characters of the 2010s, dubbing Seifert's performance as "superbly".

The unconventional gameplay mechanics also received positive remarks from critics. Destructoid's Laura Kate Dale felt that the game's pacing and structure assisted the narrative, and Wallace of Game Informer found that making a connection between key points in the narrative was entertaining. Burns of VideoGamer.com praised the game's ability to make the player realise their own biases, and challenge their "sense of self". Albert of IGN felt that the searching tool was "gratifying", and positively contributes to the pacing of the game, while The Washington Post's Thomsen wrote that the database mechanic created "contemplative gaps between scenes", allowing for "poignance and power" within the narrative. Edge thought that by having game mechanics which require the player to deduce the story through investigation and intuition, Her Story was one of few games "that truly deliver on the foundational fantasy of detective work." Bendixsen of Good Game described the desktop as "appropriately retro", noting that she was "drawn in immediately".

The game sold over 100,000 copies by 10 August 2015; about 60,000 copies were sold on Windows, with the remaining 40,000 sold on iOS. Barlow stated that the game's instant popularity surprised him, as he had instead expected the game to slowly spread by word of mouth "and maybe over six months it would pay for itself."

=== Accolades ===
Her Story has received multiple nominations and awards from gaming publications. It won Game of the Year from Polygon, as well as Game of the Month from Rock, Paper, Shotgun and GameSpot. It received the Breakthrough Award at the 33rd Golden Joystick Awards, Debut Game and Game Innovation at the 12th British Academy Games Awards, the award for Most Original game from PC Gamer, and the Seumas McNally Grand Prize at the Independent Games Festival Awards. At The Game Awards 2015, Her Story won Best Narrative, and Seifert won Best Performance for her role in the game; she also won the Great White Way Award for Best Acting in a Game at the 5th Annual New York Game Awards. Her Story won Best Emotional Mobile & Handheld at the Emotional Games Awards 2016, Mobile Game of the Year at the SXSW Gaming Awards, Mobile & Handheld at the British Academy Games Awards, and awards for excellence in story and innovation at the International Mobile Gaming Awards, while The Guardian named it the best iOS game of 2015, In 2015, Edge ranked Her Story as 94th in their list of the greatest videogames of all time.

| Award | Date | Category | Recipient(s) and nominee(s) | Result | Ref. |
|---|---|---|---|---|---|
| Golden Joystick Awards | 30 October 2015 | Breakthrough Award | Her Story | Won | |
| Golden Joystick Awards | 30 October 2015 | Game of the Year | Her Story | Nominated | |
| Golden Joystick Awards | 30 October 2015 | PC Game of the Year | Her Story | Nominated | |
| Golden Joystick Awards | 30 October 2015 | Best Original Game | Her Story | Nominated | |
| Golden Joystick Awards | 30 October 2015 | Best Storytelling | Her Story | Nominated | |
| Golden Joystick Awards | 30 October 2015 | Best Indie Game | Her Story | Nominated | |
| Golden Joystick Awards | 30 October 2015 | Performance of the Year | Viva Seifert as Hannah Smith | Nominated | |
| The Game Awards | 3 December 2015 | Best Narrative | Her Story | Won | |
| The Game Awards | 3 December 2015 | Best Performance | Viva Seifert as Hannah Smith | Won | |
| The Game Awards | 3 December 2015 | Best Independent Game | Her Story | Nominated | |
| The Game Awards | 3 December 2015 | Games for Change | Her Story | Nominated | |
| New York Game Awards | 9 February 2016 | Great White Way Award for Best Acting in a Game | Viva Seifert as Hannah Smith | Won | |
| New York Game Awards | 9 February 2016 | Big Apple Award for Best Game | Her Story | Nominated | |
| New York Game Awards | 9 February 2016 | Off Broadway Award for Best Indie Game | Her Story | Nominated | |
| New York Game Awards | 9 February 2016 | Herman Melville Award for Best Writing | Her Story | Nominated | |
| D.I.C.E. Awards | 18 February 2016 | D.I.C.E. Sprite Award | Her Story | Nominated | |
| D.I.C.E. Awards | 18 February 2016 | Outstanding Achievement in Game Design | Her Story | Nominated | |
| D.I.C.E. Awards | 18 February 2016 | Outstanding Achievement in Character | Hannah Smith | Nominated | |
| D.I.C.E. Awards | 18 February 2016 | Outstanding Achievement in Story | Her Story | Nominated | |
| Game Developers Choice Awards | 16 March 2016 | Innovation Award | Her Story | Won | |
| Game Developers Choice Awards | 16 March 2016 | Best Handheld/Mobile Game | Her Story | Won | |
| Game Developers Choice Awards | 16 March 2016 | Best Narrative | Her Story | Won | |
| Independent Games Festival Awards | 16 March 2016 | Seumas McNally Grand Prize | Her Story | Won | |
| Independent Games Festival Awards | 16 March 2016 | Excellence in Narrative | Her Story | Won | |
| Independent Games Festival Awards | 16 March 2016 | Excellence in Design | Her Story | Nominated | |
| Independent Games Festival Awards | 16 March 2016 | Nuovo Award for Innovation | Her Story | Nominated | |
| SXSW Gaming Awards | 19 March 2016 | Mobile Game of the Year | Her Story | Won | |
| SXSW Gaming Awards | 19 March 2016 | Matthew Crump Cultural Innovation Award | Her Story | Nominated | |
| SXSW Gaming Awards | 19 March 2016 | Excellence in Narrative | Her Story | Nominated | |
| SXSW Gaming Awards | 19 March 2016 | Most Enduring Character | Hannah Smith | Nominated | |
| British Academy Games Awards | 7 April 2016 | Debut Game | Her Story | Won | |
| British Academy Games Awards | 7 April 2016 | Mobile & Handheld | Her Story | Won | |
| British Academy Games Awards | 7 April 2016 | Game Innovation | Her Story | Won | |
| British Academy Games Awards | 7 April 2016 | Game Design | Her Story | Nominated | |
| British Academy Games Awards | 7 April 2016 | Story | Her Story | Nominated | |
| British Academy Games Awards | 7 April 2016 | Original Property | Her Story | Nominated | |
| British Academy Games Awards | 7 April 2016 | British Game | Her Story | Nominated | |
