= D.I.C.E. Award for Outstanding Achievement in Story =

Annual award presented by the Academy of Interactive Arts & Sciences

- Country: United States
- Presented by: Academy of Interactive Arts & Sciences
- First award: 1999
- Currently held by: Clair Obscur: Expedition 33
- Website: interactive.org

The D.I.C.E. Award for Outstanding Achievement in Story is an award presented annually by the Academy of Interactive Arts & Sciences during the D.I.C.E. Awards. This award is "presented to the individual or team whose work has furthered the interactive experience through the creation of a game world — whether an original creation, one adapted from existing material, or an extension of an existing property which best exemplifies the coalescence of setting, character, and plot". Creative/technical Academy members with expertise as a game designer or producer are qualified to vote for this award. It was first offered at the 2nd Annual Interactive Achievement Awards, with its first winner being Pokémon Red and Blue.

The award's most recent winner is Clair Obscur: Expedition 33, developed by Sandfall Interactive and published by Kepler Interactive.

== History ==
The award was originally presented as Outstanding Achievement in Character or Story Development, recognizing "the individual or team whose work has furthered the interactive experience through the creation of a memorable character or a memorable story within an interactive title." This was renamed to Outstanding Achievement in Story and Character Development for the 2006 Awards, and then simplified to Outstanding Achievement in Story Development for the 2008 Awards. The award was separated into Outstanding Achievement in Original Story and the Outstanding Achievement in Adapted Story for the 2009 Awards; Original Story for the "creation of an original game world", and Adapted Story for "a game based on previously existing material" which "can be an adaptation or an extension of existing licensed property or brand". The two categories were eventually merged back into one category at the 2011 Awards.

- Outstanding Achievement in Character or Story Development (1999–2005)
- Outstanding Achievement in Story and Character Development (2006–2007)
- Outstanding Achievement in Story Development (2008)
- Outstanding Achievement in Original Story (2009–2010)
- Outstanding Achievement in Adapted Story (2009–2010)
- Outstanding Achievement in Story (2011–present)

== Winners and nominees ==
=== 1990s ===
Table key
Indicates the winner

Year	Game	Developer(s)	Publisher(s)	Ref.
1998/1999 (2nd)	Pokémon Red and Blue	Game Freak	Nintendo	
1998/1999 (2nd)	Grim Fandango	LucasArts	LucasArts	
1998/1999 (2nd)	Half-Life	Valve	Sierra On-Line	
1998/1999 (2nd)	King's Quest: Mask of Eternity	Sierra On-Line	Sierra On-Line	
1998/1999 (2nd)	Metal Gear Solid	Konami	Konami	
1998/1999 (2nd)	Sanitarium	DreamForge Intertainment	ASC Games	
1998/1999 (2nd)	The Legend of Zelda: Ocarina of Time	Nintendo EAD	Nintendo	
1998/1999 (2nd)	The X-Files Game	HyperBole Studios	Fox Interactive	
1999/2000 (3rd)	Age of Empires II: The Age of Kings	Ensemble Studios	Microsoft Games	
1999/2000 (3rd)	Thief: The Dark Project	Looking Glass Studios	Eidos Interactive	
1999/2000 (3rd)	Nox	Westwood Studios	Westwood Studios, Electronic Arts	
1999/2000 (3rd)	Omikron: The Nomad Soul	Quantic Dream	Eidos Interactive	
1999/2000 (3rd)	Planescape: Torment	Black Isle Studios	Interplay Entertainment	

=== 2000s ===
Year	Game	Developer(s)	Publisher(s)	Ref.
2000 (4th)	Baldur's Gate II: Shadows of Amn	BioWare	Interplay Entertainment	
2000 (4th)	Final Fantasy IX	SquareSoft	Square Electronic Arts	
2000 (4th)	Shenmue	Sega AM2	Sega	
2000 (4th)	Skies of Arcadia	Overworks	Sega	
2001 (5th)	Ico	Japan Studio	Sony Computer Entertainment	
2001 (5th)	Black & White	Lionhead Studios	Electronic Arts	
2001 (5th)	Conker's Bad Fur Day	Rare	Rare	
2001 (5th)	Metal Gear Solid 2: Sons of Liberty	Konami	Konami	
2001 (5th)	Myst III: Exile	Presto Studios	Ubisoft	
2002 (6th)	Eternal Darkness: Sanity's Requiem	Silicon Knights	Nintendo	
2002 (6th)	Grand Theft Auto: Vice City	Rockstar North	Rockstar Games	
2002 (6th)	Kingdom Hearts	SquareSoft	Square Electronic Arts	
2002 (6th)	Syberia	Microids	The Adventure Company	
2002 (6th)	The Mark of Kri	San Diego Studio	Sony Computer Entertainment	
2003 (7th)	Star Wars: Knights of the Old Republic	BioWare	LucasArts	
2003 (7th)	Beyond Good & Evil	Ubisoft Montpellier	Ubisoft	
2003 (7th)	Prince of Persia: The Sands of Time	Ubisoft Montreal	Ubisoft	
2003 (7th)	Ratchet & Clank: Going Commando	Insomniac Games	Sony Computer Entertainment	
2003 (7th)	The Legend of Zelda: The Wind Waker	Nintendo EAD	Nintendo	
2004 (8th)	Fable	Lionhead Studios	Microsoft Game Studios	
2004 (8th)	Forgotten Realms: Demon Stone	Stormfront Studios	Atari, Inc.	
2004 (8th)	Grand Theft Auto: San Andreas	Rockstar North	Rockstar Games	
2004 (8th)	Half-Life 2	Valve	Vivendi Universal Games	
2004 (8th)	Psi-Ops: The Mindgate Conspiracy	Midway Games	Midway Games	
2005 (9th)	Call of Duty 2: Big Red One	Treyarch	Activision	
2005 (9th)	Brothers in Arms: Earned in Blood	Gearbox Software	Ubisoft	
2005 (9th)	Gun	Neversoft	Activision	
2005 (9th)	King Kong	Ubisoft Montpellier	Ubisoft	
2005 (9th)	Sly 3: Honor Among Thieves	Sucker Punch Productions	Sony Computer Entertainment	
2006 (10th)	The Legend of Zelda: Twilight Princess	Nintendo EAD	Nintendo	
2006 (10th)	24: The Game	Guerrilla Cambridge	2K Games	
2006 (10th)	Dreamfall: The Longest Journey	Funcom	Aspyr	
2006 (10th)	Saints Row	Volition	THQ	
2006 (10th)	Sam & Max Episode 1: Culture Shock	Telltale Games	Telltale Games	
2007 (11th)	BioShock	2K Boston, 2K Australia	2K Games	
2007 (11th)	Drawn to Life	5th Cell	THQ	
2007 (11th)	Mass Effect	BioWare	Microsoft Game Studios	
2007 (11th)	The Darkness	Starbreeze Studios	2K Games	
2007 (11th)	Uncharted: Drake's Fortune	Naughty Dog	Sony Computer Entertainment	
2008 (12th)	Outstanding Achievement in Original Story			
2008 (12th)	Fallout 3	Bethesda Game Studios	Bethesda Softworks	
2008 (12th)	Brothers in Arms: Hell's Highway	Gearbox Software	Ubisoft	
2008 (12th)	Fable II	Lionhead Studios	Microsoft Game Studios	
2008 (12th)	Grand Theft Auto IV	Rockstar North	Rockstar Games	
2008 (12th)	Professor Layton and the Curious Village	Level-5	Nintendo	
2008 (12th)	Outstanding Achievement in Adapted Story			
2008 (12th)	Star Wars: The Force Unleashed	LucasArts	LucasArts	
2008 (12th)	Lego Batman: The Videogame	Traveller's Tales	Warner Bros. Interactive Entertainment	
2008 (12th)	Mortal Kombat vs. DC Universe	Midway Games	Midway Games	
2008 (12th)	Naruto: The Broken Bond	Ubisoft Montreal	Ubisoft	
2008 (12th)	007: Quantum of Solace	Treyarch	Activision	
2009 (13th)	Outstanding Achievement in Original Story			
2009 (13th)	Uncharted 2: Among Thieves	Naughty Dog	Sony Computer Entertainment	
2009 (13th)	Assassin's Creed II	Ubisoft Montreal	Ubisoft	
2009 (13th)	Brütal Legend	Double Fine Productions	Electronic Arts	
2009 (13th)	Professor Layton and the Diabolical Box	Level-5	Nintendo	
2009 (13th)	Ratchet & Clank Future: A Crack in Time	Insomniac Games	Sony Computer Entertainment	
2009 (13th)	Outstanding Achievement in Adapted Story			
2009 (13th)	Batman: Arkham Asylum	Rocksteady Studios	Warner Bros. Interactive Entertainment	
2009 (13th)	Ghostbusters: The Video Game	Terminal Reality	Atari, Inc.	
2009 (13th)	Marvel Ultimate Alliance 2	Vicarious Visions	Activision	

=== 2010s ===
Year	Game	Developer(s)	Publisher(s)	Ref.
2010 (14th)	Mass Effect 2	BioWare	Electronic Arts	
2010 (14th)	Alan Wake	Remedy Entertainment	Microsoft Game Studios	
2010 (14th)	Enslaved: Odyssey to the West	Ninja Theory	Namco Bandai Games	
2010 (14th)	Heavy Rain	Quantic Dream	Sony Computer Entertainment	
2010 (14th)	Metro 2033	4A Games	THQ	
2011 (15th)	The Elder Scrolls V: Skyrim	Bethesda Game Studios	Bethesda Softworks	
2011 (15th)	Bastion	Supergiant Games	Warner Bros. Interactive Entertainment	
2011 (15th)	L.A. Noire	Team Bondi	Rockstar Games	
2011 (15th)	Portal 2	Valve	Valve	
2011 (15th)	Uncharted 3: Drake's Deception	Naughty Dog	Sony Computer Entertainment	
2012 (16th)	The Walking Dead	Telltale Games	Telltale Games	
2012 (16th)	Dishonored	Arkane Studios	Bethesda Softworks	
2012 (16th)	Journey	Thatgamecompany	Sony Computer Entertainment	
2012 (16th)	Sleeping Dogs	United Front Games	Square Enix	
2012 (16th)	Spec Ops: The Line	Yager Development	2K Games	
2013 (17th)	The Last of Us	Naughty Dog	Sony Computer Entertainment	
2013 (17th)	Beyond: Two Souls	Quantic Dream	Sony Computer Entertainment	
2013 (17th)	BioShock Infinite	Irrational Games	2K Games	
2013 (17th)	The Novelist	Orthogonal Games	Orthogonal Games	
2013 (17th)	Tomb Raider	Crystal Dynamics	Square Enix Europe	
2014 (18th)	Middle-earth: Shadow of Mordor	Monolith Productions	Warner Bros. Interactive Entertainment	
2014 (18th)	South Park: The Stick of Truth	Obsidian Entertainment, South Park Digital Studios	Ubisoft	
2014 (18th)	The Wolf Among Us	Telltale Games	Telltale Games	
2014 (18th)	This War of Mine	11 Bit Studios	11 Bit Studios	
2014 (18th)	Valiant Hearts: The Great War	Ubisoft Montpellier	Ubisoft	
2015 (19th)	The Witcher 3: Wild Hunt	CD Projekt Red	CD Projekt	
2015 (19th)	Fallout 4	Bethesda Game Studios	Bethesda Softworks	
2015 (19th)	Her Story	Sam Barlow	Sam Barlow	
2015 (19th)	Rise of the Tomb Raider	Crystal Dynamics	Square Enix Europe	
2015 (19th)	Tales from the Borderlands	Telltale Games	Telltale Games	
2016 (20th)	Uncharted 4: A Thief's End	Naughty Dog	Sony Interactive Entertainment	
2016 (20th)	Firewatch	Campo Santo	Campo Santo	
2016 (20th)	Inside	Playdead	Playdead	
2016 (20th)	Oxenfree	Night School Studio	Night School Studio	
2016 (20th)	That Dragon, Cancer	Numinous Games	Numinous Games	
2017 (21st)	Horizon Zero Dawn	Guerrilla Games	Sony Interactive Entertainment	
2017 (21st)	Hellblade: Senua's Sacrifice	Ninja Theory	Ninja Theory	
2017 (21st)	Night in the Woods	Infinite Fall, Secret Lab	Finji	
2017 (21st)	What Remains of Edith Finch	Giant Sparrow	Annapurna Interactive	
2017 (21st)	Wolfenstein II: The New Colossus	MachineGames	Bethesda Softworks	
2018 (22nd)	God of War	Santa Monica Studio	Sony Interactive Entertainment	
2018 (22nd)	Assassin's Creed Odyssey	Ubisoft Quebec	Ubisoft	
2018 (22nd)	Florence	Mountains	Annapurna Interactive	
2018 (22nd)	Marvel's Spider-Man	Insomniac Games	Sony Interactive Entertainment	
2018 (22nd)	Return of the Obra Dinn	Lucas Pope	3909	
2019 (23rd)	Disco Elysium	ZA/UM	ZA/UM	
2019 (23rd)	Control	Remedy Entertainment	505 Games	
2019 (23rd)	Outer Wilds	Mobius Digital	Annapurna Interactive	
2019 (23rd)	Telling Lies	Sam Barlow, Furious Bee	Annapurna Interactive	
2019 (23rd)	The Outer Worlds	Obsidian Entertainment	Private Division	

=== 2020s ===
Year	Game	Developer(s)	Publisher(s)	Ref.
2020 (24th)	The Last of Us Part II	Naughty Dog	Sony Interactive Entertainment	
2020 (24th)	13 Sentinels: Aegis Rim	Vanillaware	Sega	
2020 (24th)	Ghost of Tsushima	Sucker Punch Productions	Sony Interactive Entertainment	
2020 (24th)	Hades	Supergiant Games	Supergiant Games	
2020 (24th)	Kentucky Route Zero	Cardboard Computer	Annapurna Interactive	
2021 (25th)	Marvel's Guardians of the Galaxy	Eidos-Montréal	Square Enix Europe	
2021 (25th)	Before Your Eyes	GoodbyeWorld Games	Skybound Games	
2021 (25th)	Inscryption	Daniel Mullins Games	Devolver Digital	
2021 (25th)	Psychonauts 2	Double Fine Productions	Xbox Game Studios	
2021 (25th)	The Forgotten City	Modern Storyteller	Dear Villagers	
2022 (26th)	God of War Ragnarök	Santa Monica Studio	Sony Interactive Entertainment	
2022 (26th)	Elden Ring	FromSoftware	Bandai Namco Entertainment	
2022 (26th)	I Was a Teenage Exocolonist	Northway Games	Finji	
2022 (26th)	Immortality	Half Mermaid Productions	Half Mermaid Productions	
2022 (26th)	Norco	Geography of Robots	Raw Fury	
2023 (27th)	Baldur's Gate 3	Larian Studios	Larian Studios	
2023 (27th)	Alan Wake 2	Remedy Entertainment	Epic Games	
2023 (27th)	Dave the Diver	Mintrocket	Mintrocket	
2023 (27th)	Thirsty Suitors	Outerloop Games	Annapurna Interactive	
2023 (27th)	Venba	Visai Games	Visai Games	
2024 (28th)	Indiana Jones and the Great Circle	MachineGames	Bethesda Softworks	
2024 (28th)	1000xResist	Sunset Visitor	Fellow Traveller Games	
2024 (28th)	Metaphor: ReFantazio	Studio Zero	Atlus	
2024 (28th)	Still Wakes the Deep	The Chinese Room	Secret Mode	
2024 (28th)	Thank Goodness You're Here!	Coal Supper	Panic Inc.	
2025 (29th)	Clair Obscur: Expedition 33	Sandfall Interactive	Kepler Interactive	
2025 (29th)	Consume Me	Hexecutable LLC	Hexecutable LLC	
2025 (29th)	Despelote	Julián Cordero, Sebastián Valbuena	Panic Inc.	
2025 (29th)	South of Midnight	Compulsion Games	Xbox Game Studios	
2025 (29th)	The Drifter	Powerhoof	Powerhoof	

== Multiple nominations and wins ==
=== Developers and publishers ===
Sony has published the most nominees and winners, with its first-party developer Naughty Dog having developed the most nominees and winners. Sony is also the only publisher to have published back-to-back winners. The only other developers to have developed more than one winner are BioWare, Bethesda Game Studios, and Sony's Santa Monica Studio. Ubisoft has published the most nominees without a single winner.

Developers
Developer	Nominations	Wins
Naughty Dog	6	4
BioWare	4	3
Bethesda Game Studios	3	2
Santa Monica Studio	2	2
Telltale Games	4	1
Lionhead Studios	3	1
Nintendo EAD	3	1
2K Boston/Irrational Games	2	1
LucasArts	2	1
MachineGames	2	1
Treyarch	2	1
Insomniac Games	3	0
Quantic Dream	3	0
Remedy Entertainment	3	0
Rockstar North	3	0
Ubisoft Montpellier	3	0
Ubisoft Montreal	3	0
Valve	3	0
Double Fine Productions	2	0
Gearbox Software	2	0
Konami	2	0
Level-5	2	0
Midway Games	2	0
Ninja Theory	2	0
Obsidian Entertainment	2	0
Sam Barlow	2	0
SquareSoft	2	0
Sucker Punch Productions	2	0
Supergiant Games	2	0

Publishers
Publisher	Nominations	Wins
Sony Computer/Interactive Entertainment	19	8
Nintendo	7	3
Bethesda Softworks	6	3
Microsoft/Xbox Game Studios	7	2
Warner Bros. Interactive Entertainment	4	2
LucasArts	3	2
Electronic Arts	6	1
2K Games	5	1
Eidos Interactive/Square Enix Europe	5	1
Activision	4	1
Telltale Games	4	1
Interplay Productions	2	1
Ubisoft	11	0
Annapurna Interactive	6	0
Rockstar Games	4	0
Sega	3	0
THQ	3	0
Atari	2	0
Bandai Namco Entertainment	2	0
Finji	2	0
Konami	2	0
Midway Games	2	0
Panic Inc.	2	0
Sierra On-Line	2	0
SquareSoft	2	0
Valve	2	0

=== Franchises ===
Uncharted is the most nominated franchise, and is one of five franchises to have won more than once; the other four being Baldur's Gate, God of War, The Last of Us, and Star Wars. Grand Theft Auto is the most nominated franchise that has never won.

Franchises
Franchises	Nominations	Wins
Uncharted	4	2
Baldur's Gate	2	2
God of War	2	2
Star Wars	2	2
The Last of Us	2	2
The Legend of Zelda	3	1
Batman	2	1
BioShock	2	1
Fable	2	1
Fallout	2	1
Mass Effect	2	1
Grand Theft Auto	3	0
Alan Wake	2	0
Assassin's Creed	2	0
Brothers in Arms	2	0
Half-Life	2	0
Metal Gear	2	0
Professor Layton	2	0
Ratchet & Clank	2	0
Tomb Raider	2	0
