= The Game Awards 2015 =

American video game awards

- Date: December 3, 2015
- Venue: Microsoft Theater, Los Angeles, United States
- Country: United States
- Hosted by: Geoff Keighley

Highlights
- Most awards: The Witcher 3: Wild Hunt (3)
- Most nominations: The Witcher 3: Wild Hunt (6)
- Game of the Year: The Witcher 3: Wild Hunt
- Industry Icon Award: Brett Sperry and Louis Castle (Westwood Studios)
- Website: thegameawards.com
- Viewership: 2.3 million

The Game Awards 2015 was an award show that honored the best video games of 2015. It was produced and hosted by Geoff Keighley at the Microsoft Theater in Los Angeles on December 3, 2015. The Witcher 3: Wild Hunt won the show's Game of the Year award. The event featured live performances from Chvrches, Ben Harper, Stephanie Joosten and Deadmau5.

== Premieres ==
The ceremony featured several game premieres, including Telltale Games's Batman: The Telltale Series and The Walking Dead: Michonne, Double Fine Productions's Psychonauts 2 and Harmonix's Rock Band VR. There were also new trailers for upcoming games, including Ubisoft's Far Cry Primal, Naughty Dog's Uncharted 4: A Thief's End, Remedy Entertainment's Quantum Break and Cloud Imperium Games's Star Citizen. Ports and remasters were also announced including an Xbox One port for Psyonix's Rocket League and a remastered version of Chair Entertainment's Shadow Complex.

The broadcast saw a total viewership of around 2.3 million.

== Winners and nominees ==
The nominees for The Game Awards 2015 were announced on November 13, 2015. Candidate games must have a commercial release date on or before November 24, 2015 to be eligible.

The winners were announced during the awards ceremony on December 3, 2015. Winners are shown first in bold, and indicated with a double-dagger (‡).

=== Jury-voted awards ===
Game of the Year	Developer of the Year
**The Witcher 3: Wild Hunt – CD Projekt Red**‡; Bloodborne – FromSoftware; Fallout 4 – Bethesda Game Studios; Metal Gear Solid V: The Phantom Pain – Kojima Productions; Super Mario Maker – Nintendo	**CD Projekt Red**‡; Bethesda Game Studios; FromSoftware; Kojima Productions; Nintendo
Best Independent Game	Best Mobile/Handheld Game
**Rocket League – Psyonix**‡; Axiom Verge – Tom Happ; Her Story – Sam Barlow; Ori and the Blind Forest – Moon Studios; Undertale – Toby Fox	**Lara Croft Go – Square Enix Montréal**‡; Downwell – Moppin; Fallout Shelter – Bethesda Game Studios and Behaviour Interactive; Monster Hunter 4 Ultimate – Capcom; Pac-Man 256 – Hipster Whale
Best Narrative	Best Art Direction
**Her Story – Sam Barlow**‡; Life Is Strange – Dontnod Entertainment; Tales from the Borderlands – Telltale Games; The Witcher 3: Wild Hunt – CD Projekt Red; Until Dawn – Supermassive Games	**Ori and the Blind Forest – Moon Studios**‡; Batman: Arkham Knight – Rocksteady Studios; Bloodborne – FromSoftware; Metal Gear Solid V: The Phantom Pain – Kojima Productions; The Witcher 3: Wild Hunt – CD Projekt Red
Best Score/Soundtrack	Best Performance
**Metal Gear Solid V: The Phantom Pain – Kojima Productions**‡; Fallout 4 – Bethesda Game Studios; Halo 5: Guardians – 343 Industries; Ori and the Blind Forest – Moon Studios; The Witcher 3: Wild Hunt – CD Projekt Red	**Viva Seifert as Hannah Smith – Her Story**‡; Ashly Burch as Chloe Price – Life Is Strange; Camilla Luddington as Lara Croft – Rise of the Tomb Raider; Doug Cockle as Geralt of Rivia – The Witcher 3: Wild Hunt; Mark Hamill as the Joker – Batman: Arkham Knight
Games for Impact	Best Shooter
**Life Is Strange – Dontnod Entertainment**‡; Cibele – Star Maid Games; Her Story – Sam Barlow; Sunset – Tale of Tales; Undertale – by Toby Fox	**Splatoon – Nintendo**‡; Call of Duty: Black Ops III – Treyarch; Destiny: The Taken King – Bungie; Halo 5: Guardians – 343 Industries; Star Wars Battlefront – EA Digital Illusions CE
Best Action/Adventure	Best Role Playing Game
**Metal Gear Solid V: The Phantom Pain – Kojima Productions**‡; Assassin's Creed Syndicate – Ubisoft Quebec; Batman: Arkham Knight – Rocksteady Studios; Ori and the Blind Forest – Moon Studios; Rise of the Tomb Raider – Crystal Dynamics	**The Witcher 3: Wild Hunt – CD Projekt Red**‡; Bloodborne – FromSoftware; Fallout 4 – Bethesda Game Studios; Pillars of Eternity – Obsidian Entertainment; Undertale – Toby Fox
Best Fighting Game	Best Family Game
**Mortal Kombat X – NetherRealm Studios**‡; Guilty Gear Xrd –SIGN– – Arc System Works Team Red; Rise of Incarnates – Bandai Namco Entertainment; Rising Thunder – Radiant Entertainment	**Super Mario Maker – Nintendo**‡; Disney Infinity 3.0 – Avalanche Software with additional work by Ninja Theory, Studio Gobo, Sumo Digital and United Front Games; Lego Dimensions – Traveller's Tales; Skylanders: SuperChargers – Vicarious Visions and Beenox; Splatoon – Nintendo
Best Sports/Racing Game	Best Multiplayer
**Rocket League – Psyonix**‡; FIFA 16 – EA Canada; Forza Motorsport 6 – Turn 10 Studios; NBA 2K16 – Visual Concepts; Pro Evolution Soccer 2016 – PES Productions	**Splatoon – Nintendo**‡; Call of Duty: Black Ops III – Treyarch; Destiny: The Taken King – Bungie; Halo 5: Guardians – 343 Industries; Rocket League – Psyonix

=== Fan's choice awards ===
Most Anticipated Game	Esports Player of the Year
**No Man's Sky** – Hello Games; Horizon Zero Dawn – Guerrilla Games; Quantum Break – Remedy Entertainment; The Last Guardian – genDESIGN and Japan Studio; Uncharted 4: A Thief's End – Naughty Dog	**Kenny "KennyS" Schrub (Team EnVyUs – Counter-Strike: Global Offensive)**; Lee "Faker" Sang-hyeok (SK Telecom T1 – League of Legends); Olof "olofmeister" Kajbjer (Fnatic – Counter-Strike: Global Offensive); Peter "ppd" Dager (Evil Geniuses – Dota 2); Syed Sumail "Suma1L" Hassan (Evil Geniuses – Dota 2)
Esports Team of the Year	Esports Game of the Year
**OpTic Gaming**; Evil Geniuses; Fnatic; SK Telecom T1; Team SoloMid	**Counter-Strike: Global Offensive** – developed by Valve; Call of Duty: Advanced Warfare – developed by Sledgehammer Games; Dota 2 – developed by Valve; Hearthstone: Heroes of Warcraft – developed by Blizzard Entertainment; League of Legends – developed by Riot Games
Trending Gamer	Best Fan Creation
**Greg Miller**; TotalBiscuit; Christopher "MonteCristo" Mykles; Markiplier; PewDiePie	**Portal Stories: Mel** – by Prism Studios; GTA V – Targets – by Hoodoo Operator; Real GTA – by Corridor Digital; Twitch Plays Dark Souls – by Twitch

=== Honorary awards ===
Industry Icon Award
- **Brett Sperry and Louis Castle (Westwood Studios)**

== Games with multiple nominations and awards ==
Games that received multiple nominations
Nominations	Game
6	The Witcher 3: Wild Hunt
4	Her Story
4	Metal Gear Solid V: The Phantom Pain
4	Ori and the Blind Forest
3	Batman: Arkham Knight
3	Bloodborne
3	Fallout 4
3	Halo 5: Guardians
3	Life Is Strange
3	Rocket League
3	Splatoon
3	Undertale
2	Call of Duty: Black Ops III
2	Destiny: The Taken King
2	Rise of the Tomb Raider
2	Super Mario Maker

Games that received multiple awards
Awards	Game
2	Her Story
2	Metal Gear Solid V: The Phantom Pain
2	Rocket League
2	Splatoon
2	The Witcher 3: Wild Hunt
