= Of Shark and Man =

2017 documentary film

- Directed by: David Diley
- Written by: David Diley
- Produced by: David Diley
- Edited by: David Diley
- Production company: Scarlet View Media
- Distributed by: Shami Media Group
- Release date: 29 July 2017
- Running time: 84 minutes
- Country: United Kingdom
- Language: English

Of Shark and Man is a 2017 British documentary film produced and directed by David Diley, about Shark Reef in Fiji, a location where divers can encounter up to a hundred of the world's largest bull sharks on one dive. Shark Reef in Fiji was described by underwater filmmakers Ron Taylor and Valerie Taylor as "the best shark dive in the world." The film was released on 29 June 2017, distributed by Shami Media Group. Of Shark and Man is Diley's first feature-length documentary and is the first in a series of films documenting the relationship between sharks and humans around the world. Of Shark and Man has received eight award nominations, winning five.

== Synopsis ==
David Diley is a thirty-two-year-old man, trapped in a dead end job in England's industrial north and his life is going nowhere. The film follows David as he leaves this life behind to travel to Fiji and tell the story of Shark Reef in Fiji, a reef which fifteen years earlier had been completely fished out, left devoid of life, only to be completely regenerated by the return of sharks. Of Shark and Man follows David's journey over the course of a month as he makes his way further and further into the sharks realm, culminating in a final dive within a school of sixty of the world's biggest bull sharks.

== Production ==
Production of the film began in 2011 with a handful of sequences filmed in Manchester, England, before the production team, consisting David Diley, Hamish Harper and Hugh Fairs, traveled to Pacific Harbour on the island of Viti Levu, Fiji for a period of four weeks.

Production in Fiji included 52 dives on Shark Reef which is a permanent or temporary home to eight species of shark: bull shark, tiger shark, sicklefin lemon shark, tawny nurse shark, grey reef shark, whitetip reef shark, blacktip reef shark and silvertip shark. On-location shooting in Fiji began on 11 July 2011 and wrapped on 10 August that year.

=== Post-production ===
Post-production on the film started in August 2011, taking almost four years to complete, the picture lock being confirmed in May 2015. David Diley edited the film himself with Sound Design created by U.S. based producer, composer and sound designer David Lawrie. Various musicians contributed and composed music for the soundtrack including David Lawrie, Krimewave, G-Productions, Before The Beginning, David Diley, Mark Burrows, Chris Zabriskie, Shields and Haruko. The Director's cut of the film was originally 98 minutes in length, later being cut to 84 minutes for international release.

The film was edited on Adobe Premiere Pro CS6 and graded on DaVinci Resolve.

== Release ==
Of Shark and Man was premiered to an invitation-only audience on 27 August 2015 at The Courthouse Hotel Theatre in Soho, England. The film's international distribution rights were acquired by Shami Media Group in April 2016. Of Shark and Man was released on 29 June 2017.

== Critical reception ==
Taryll Baker of UK Film Review gave Of Shark and Man a score of five out of five stars, writing: "Not only is it a remarkable film, showcasing a side to sharks we've never seen, it's an entertaining, grounded and informative experience. We hear from divers, biologists and shark experts. It's ambitious, but it's also ambiguous." John Griffith of Deeper Blue also rated the film five out of five stars, calling it "a tremendously engaging documentary" and highlighting that "the last 10 minutes are absolutely amazing, with the most stunning footage of sharks I have ever seen."

== Festival awards and nominations ==
- Winner - "Best Cinematography in a Documentary" (Berlin International Film-Maker Festival 2016)
- Winner - "Best Editing in a Documentary" (Nice International Film Festival 2016)
- Winner - "Best Sound Design" (Nice International Film Festival 2016)
- Winner - "Best Film – Organisers Choice" (Cine Submarino des Aguimes 2015)
- Winner - "Best Film – Audience Choice" (Cine Submarino des Aguimes 2015)
- Nominated - "Best Director of a Feature Documentary" (Berlin International Film-Maker Festival 2016)
- Nominated - "Best Science and Education Film" (Berlin International Film-Maker Festival 2016)
- Nominated - "Best Cinematography in a Documentary" (Nice International Film Festival 2016)
