= Telling Lies (video game) =

2019 video game

- Developers: Sam Barlow; Furious Bee
- Publisher: Annapurna Interactive
- Composer: Nainita Desai
- Platforms: iOS, macOS, Windows, Nintendo Switch, PlayStation 4, Xbox One
- Release: 23 August 2019: iOS, macOS, Windows; 23 August 2019; Nintendo Switch, PlayStation 4, Xbox One; 28 April 2020
- Genre: Interactive film
- Mode: Single-player

Telling Lies (stylized as telling l!es) is a narrative video game developed by Sam Barlow and Furious Bee and published by Annapurna Interactive in August 2019 for iOS, macOS, and Windows. Ports for Nintendo Switch, PlayStation 4, and Xbox One were released in April 2020. As with Barlow's previous title, Her Story, the game uses live action full-motion video of four people (played by Logan Marshall-Green, Alexandra Shipp, Kerry Bishé, and Angela Sarafyan) as part of video calls made between them, and the player will need to use tools provided from the game to piece together events and what statements may be lies to determine the overall mystery.

== Gameplay ==
Telling Lies is played out on a virtual desktop computer screen with its own operating system. The reflection of the player-character can be seen off the virtual monitor.

Barlow describes Telling Lies as a "desktop thriller" like Her Story, where the player becomes involved in a drama that is played out through stored video clips and other information presented on a virtual computer desktop. Telling Lies provides the player with numerous video segments that in the game's narrative, cover a two-year period and which have been stored on a stolen hard-drive taken from the National Security Agency. The player has the ability to search the hundreds of video segments on keywords as to piece together timelines, events, and interactions, all to try to understand why the four central people have been the subject of electronic surveillance, as well as the nature of the player-character's role in these events; this character appears female and can be seen in a virtual reflection of the in-game computer screen to the actual player. These clips only provide the video and audio from one side of the conversation, requiring the player to determine which clips may match the other participants, as well as potential interactions with around 30 other people. Players can scroll forwards and backwards within segments, highlight certain words in the video subtitles to use as search, and keep notes within an in-game memo pad. The player only has a limited amount of time within a single playthrough to scan material from the hard-drive, and would have to restart from scratch (losing all notes and bookmarks) if they want to see more. Barlow estimated that the content within Telling Lies is about four to five times longer than Her Story. There are three different endings that the player may reach through the game, depending on which character's videos they explored most frequently.

The game also contains a version of solitaire. The deck lacks the king of clubs and is therefore unwinnable.

== Plot ==
In 2019, Karen Douglas, a former FBI agent, accesses a USB drive on her computer, watching the videos on it by searching them using keywords.

They tell the story of David Smith (Logan Marshall-Green), an FBI agent. During 2017 and 2018, David was undercover, supervised by his handler Mike, working on a case code-named Green Dagger. Its goal was to investigate potential acts of terrorism by the environmental group "Green Storm", led by the activist Riordan. To infiltrate this group, David would start by infiltrating a smaller team, the "Organizing Group", which targeted the corporation Prosperen, due to its plans to build a pipeline which the activists believed would pollute the water source. David approached one of the group's members, Ava (Alexandra Shipp), and developed a romantic relationship with her, eventually being invited to the Organizing Group.

The Organizing Group was led by 4 people: Eric, Wesley, Peter, and Simon. Simon was secretly a Black Kite agent providing information to the FBI, an arrangement David was unhappy with as he felt Simon was unprofessional. As David ingratiated himself with the group, he discovered that Peter had previously slept with Ava while she was underage, drugged her and filmed their relations. David attacks Peter, angering Ava and the FBI, and then uses a former contact named Harry to plant drugs on Peter, framing him. David grows increasingly unstable, and outs Simon as a Black Kite Spy. These actions and his growing closeness to Ava alarm Mike. David invites Riordan and the Organizing Group to a meeting on his boat, to discuss plans to disrupt movement on a key bridge vital for Prosperen's plans. While on the boat, Ava reveals that she is pregnant with David's child.

A new Black Kite spy infiltrates Green Storm, and David coordinates with him to trap Riordan into getting involved in a direct attack on the bridge. The plan goes awry, and David discovers that Mike and Black Kite have decided to hold off on Green Storm, and arrest the Organizing Group. David protests, but fails to persuade Mike, who tells him to end his infiltration. The Organizing Group is then arrested, including Ava. David is angry at Mike, but Mike notes that David had been withholding information, including Ava's pregnancy. David tries to continue meeting with the Organizing Group, but Karen Douglas, his then-field supervisor, bursts in to provide him cover to leave. David is furious, but agrees to withdraw. Ava is heartbroken and outraged at David's disappearance.

Meanwhile, David has problems with his wife Emma (Kerry Bishé) and daughter Alba. While David was undercover, Emma’s mother Laura moved in. During David's mission, Laura developed dementia and died, despite medical care by Steven, an anaesthesiologist hired by the couple. In addition, it is revealed that when David was Emma's boyfriend, he killed Paul, Emma’s abusive ex-boyfriend, with Emma as an unwilling accomplice.

To cope with stress, David had been having conversations with a sex worker named Maxine Williams (Angela Sarafyan), who ran a webcam chatroom with multiple aliases. David paid her for conversation, and shared personal stories with Maxine, including his identity. As his life falls apart, David begins believing he has a real connection with Maxine. She bans him, and when he keeps returning, reveals that everything he knows about her is a lie, and that she has recorded their conversations, and will release them if he keeps following her. David tracks her down with Harry's help. Maxine is prepared, has already released the videos, and shoots David in the leg, as police arrives.

This destroys his relationship with Emma, who had grown scared of him. David begins living alone, estranged from his wife and Ava. He tries to reconnect with them, but both reject him. David commits suicide by detonating explosives on his boat, potentially destroying the bridge. After reviewing the videos, Karen leaks them.

The mid-credits scene shows Emma’s, Ava’s, or Maxine’s fate, depending on the videos the player has watched. Both Emma and Ava move on to a new life without David and continue to raise their daughters. Maxine leaves her place in Cleveland, Ohio and opens a cam agency in New York, going on to become a novelist writing crime stories with ‘strong female leads’.

== Development ==
Barlow's work on Telling Lies began in January 2016 as a "spiritual successor" to Her Story, with a narrative unrelated to the first game, though it continued to use full-motion video as its central gameplay element. Though some had urged him to make a direct sequel to Her Story by creating another murder mystery and putting another actor in place, Barlow wanted something that was more risky, and utilising the aspects of Her Story where the player got to know more about the main character through the clips. He came to the concept of electronic surveillance as a central theme in part of being a parent himself and wanting to keep track of his own pre-teen-aged son's online activities. In reading up about surveillance methods used by the National Security Agency and MI5, Barlow read up on the Optic Nerve program and found that it had several similarities to Her Story, including the ability to search on stored video and audio through keywords.

In July 2017, Barlow announced that the game, titled Telling Lies, would feature three to four key characters. He described the game as a combination of the films The Conversation (1974) and Shame (2011). The game was published by Annapurna Interactive and shooting for the game had been scheduled to start in late 2017 or early 2018. For filming, Barlow wanted the conversations between characters to appear natural, ideally filming both actors as they conversed but from different locations. To accomplish this, they were able to rent out a compound that had a number of different homes and buildings that they could make appear like the different locations that were called for in the script, including scenes where they were moving about the compound. In this fashion, the actors recorded their lines in their separate locations over video conferencing calls, with Barlow and other directors running between the sets as needed to provide direction. The shooting was done mostly in chronological order of the narrative story, with over 100 hours of footage captured. Only about ten hours of this were used for the game itself.

By March 2019, Barlow released the game's first trailer. The game was subsequently released on 23 August 2019 for iOS devices, and Windows and macOS personal computers. Console ports to PlayStation 4, Xbox One and Nintendo Switch were scheduled for release on 28 April 2020.

== Reception ==
Reception

Aggregate score
Aggregator	Score
Metacritic	iOS: 87/100; PC: 84/100; NS: 80/100; PS4: 79/100; XONE: 80/100

Review scores
Publication	Score
Destructoid	9/10
Edge	9/10
Game Informer	9/10
GameSpot	7/10
GamesRadar+	4.5/5
IGN	9/10
Jeuxvideo.com	16/20
PC Gamer (US)	87/100
Pocket Gamer	4.5/5
USgamer	4.5/5

Telling Lies received an aggregated score of 84/100 on Metacritic, indicating "generally favorable reviews". GamesRadar+ said that the exploration of footage felt "totally organic and beautifully paced", and that "Sam Barlow has another masterpiece on his hands." Kotaku praised the story and acting, saying that "the cast of Telling Lies is uniformly excellent, delivering performances far beyond anything I've seen in an FMV game." US Gamer said that in terms of "good interactive mysteries, Telling Lies is among the best you can get." PC Gamer said "the core concept—an open-ended story that's revealed in a different way to every person who plays the game—is still enormously compelling". IGN found the user interface to be somewhat unintuitive, but said that "every one of its short video clips is packed with meaning, and working out where you should go next is rewarding because each subplot is gripping." Game Informer praised the game's freedom to explore the story and the psychology of the characters, saying that "once I discovered the answers to the central mystery, I didn't stop playing – I continued to find every bit of video content I could because I was enthralled by the people in this world." The Telegraph celebrated the game's interactivity as it takes you through a mystery thriller. The Guardian praised it as an expansion of concepts in Her Story, saying that the game "doesn't hold your hand, and ultimately it's down to you to decide the truth – another secret of a good mystery done well." EGM also complimented its shift from the murder mystery in Her Story to a political thriller, calling it "a thought-provoking look at the modern surveillance state—delivered not through soapbox lecture but by forcing you, unsettlingly, to participate."

Calling it "one of the most brilliant games of the year", The Washington Post said the game "works its magic by making you rethink things you hadn't thought to question", its "crafted voyeurism should inspire the creep in you." Rock Paper Shotgun called it "bigger, better, faster, stronger" than Her Story, while saying that the nature of the found video made the game feel more voyeuristic. Eurogamer felt that its experiment with storytelling was flawed as "a little wobbly, a little naive," but also "courageous and exciting".

Hardcore Gamer was critical of the game compared to Her Story, saying that "Telling Lies does not hit the same emotional highs". GameSpot criticized the lack of structure, saying "the mechanics, writing, and performances create a real feeling of peering into someone else's private world all the way through, but the game doesn't give you much in the way of agency."

=== Awards ===
Year	Award	Category	Result	Ref.
2019	Golden Joystick Awards	Best Storytelling	Nominated	
2019	Golden Joystick Awards	Best Indie Game	Nominated	
2019	Golden Joystick Awards	Best Performer (Logan Marshall-Green)	Won	
2019	Golden Joystick Awards	Ultimate Game of the Year	Nominated	
2019	Hollywood Music in Media Awards	Song/Score - Trailer	Nominated	
2019	Titanium Awards	Best Narrative Design	Nominated	
2020	Writers' Guild of Great Britain Awards	Best Writing in a Video Game	Nominated	
2020	New York Game Awards	Big Apple Award for Best Game of the Year	Nominated	
2020	New York Game Awards	Off Broadway Award for Best Indie Game	Nominated	
2020	New York Game Awards	Herman Melville Award for Best Writing	Nominated	
2020	New York Game Awards	Great White Way Award for Best Acting in a Game (Alexandra Shipp)	Nominated	
2020	New York Game Awards	Great White Way Award for Best Acting in a Game (Logan Marshall-Green)	Nominated	
2020	Pocket Gamer Mobile Games Awards	Best Storytelling	Won	
2020	23rd Annual D.I.C.E. Awards	Outstanding Achievement in Story	Nominated	
2020	NAVGTR Awards	Performance in a Drama, Lead (Logan Marshall-Green)	Nominated	
2020	MCV/Develop Awards	Audio Innovation of the Year	Nominated	
2020	MCV/Develop Awards	Gameplay Innovation of the Year	Nominated	
2020	MCV/Develop Awards	Narrative Innovation of the Year	Nominated	
2020	16th British Academy Games Awards	Performer in a Leading Role (Logan Marshall-Green)	Nominated	
2020	2020 Webby Awards	Best User Experience	Won	
2020	2020 Webby Awards	Best Visual Design	Nominated	
2020	2020 Webby Awards	Technical Achievement	Nominated	
