= Crusty Demons (video game) =

2006 video game

- Developer: Fluent Entertainment
- Publishers: NA: Evolved Games; EU/AU: Deep Silver Red Mile Entertainment
- Producers: Mark Simmons; Gary Burchell
- Designers: Sam Barlow; Damian Hosen
- Programmers: Ben Potton; Chris Keegan
- Artists: James Brace; Glenn Brace
- Platforms: PlayStation 2, Xbox
- Release: Xbox: NA: June 27, 2006; PlayStation 2: UK: November 24, 2006; AU: November 30, 2006
- Genre: Sports
- Modes: Single-player, multiplayer

Crusty Demons is a 2006 video game based on the freestyle motorcyclist group Crusty Demons. It was released for PlayStation 2 and Xbox.

== Gameplay ==
Crusty Demons takes its premise—extreme motocross riders resurrected by the Devil to serve his cause—and spins it into a trick‑focused riding experience. Players take on the roles of real freestyle motocross stars like Kenny Bartram or Seth Enslow, alongside fictional riders, each paired with bikes that have distinct attributes. The journey begins in a trailer park training mode, where locals guide players through the basics: pulling off ground and aerial stunts, crashing spectacularly, and even launching themselves off the bike. Crashing is central to the gameplay—the immortal rider can slam into walls, cars, or buildings, with exaggerated animations. From there, the game unfolds across compact urban levels in cities like New York, Amsterdam, Rio, and Tokyo. Each stage offers challenges ranging from checkpoint races to bizarre missions, such as rolling giant beach balls, scaring hotel residents by flinging onesself through windows, or freeing cow balloons. Stunt contests demand chaining tricks together for points. Modes extend beyond the story campaign: "Devil's Rush" timed challenges, free‑ride exploration, and split‑screen multiplayer. Unlockables include new bikes, riders, and real‑life Crusty Demons footage.

== Development ==
Fluent Entertainment acquired the Crusty Demons license in November 2004.

== Reception ==
Reception

Aggregate score
Aggregator	Score
Metacritic	51/100

Review scores
Publication	Score
Associated Press	1.5/5
Detroit Free Press	1/5
GameSpot	4.6/10
IGN	5.2/10
PALGN	6/10
TeamXbox	6.3/10

The game holds a 51% rating on Metacritic indicating mixed or average reviews.

GameSpot rated the game a 4.6 of 10, stating "It's easy to appreciate the conceptual twist Crusty Demons puts on traditional extreme motorcross [sic] games; it's too bad that the game never really rises above its promising concept."
