= Marc with a C =

American singer-songwriter

- Born: Marc Sirdoreus; January 17, 1978 (age 48)
- Genres: Pop, indie, lo-fi
- Instruments: Guitar, vocals, drums
- Years active: 1999–present
- Label: Needlejuice Records
- Website: marcwithac.com

Marc with a C is the stage name of Marc Sirdoreus (born January 17, 1978), an indie pop singer-songwriter from Orlando, Florida. He has released eighteen studio albums and numerous other EPs and compilations since 2002.

== Biography ==
Sirdoreus first began playing music in the Central Florida area with an alternative rock band before releasing his first solo album, Human Slushy, in 2002. Riding the local success of the first single, "Why Don't Girls Like Me?", Marc with a C won the Orlando Weekly's Best Acoustic Act award in 2003.

However, production on his second release, 2004's Bubblegum Romance, was troubled. Initially conceived and recorded as what Sirdoreus describes as "a big ol' arena rock affair", two years of work was scrapped and re-recorded in two days with Chris Zabriskie producing and playing drums.

Sirdoreus has released one album a year since that time, including This World is Scary as Fuck, Life's So Hard, Normal Bias, Linda Lovelace for President, and Pop! Pop! Pop!. He has also released various EPs, hits compilations, and "Official Bootlegs" of live shows. In 2009, Sirdoreus announced he would be putting the mp3s of all of his albums online for free, in addition to selling CDs and mp3s through iTunes.

Marc with a C is known in the Orlando area for "marathon" live shows that often span nearly three hours and include covers ranging from The Who to songs from Rocky Horror Picture Show sequel Shock Treatment. Marc with a C performed at the Athens PopFest in 2008, and made an appearance on WMBR's "Phoning It In" show shortly thereafter. Marc would return to the festival in 2011. Marc with a C also performed at nerd music festival Nerdapalooza in 2008, 2009, 2010 and 2011. In both 2010 and 2011, Marc With a C was voted Orlando's Best Indie Act in the Orlando Weekly's yearly readers poll.

In August 2021, it was announced that Needlejuice Records had acquired the rights to Marc's "canon" catalog for future reissues, following their releases of The Obscurity Trilogy in 2019 and Shock Treatment (Interpretations) in 2021. They have since started a reissue series of their albums, starting with Linda Lovelace For President in 2025 (coinciding with the release of Steamed Hams).

== Discography ==
=== Studio albums ===
- Human Slushy (2002)
- Bubblegum Romance (2004)
- This World is Scary as Fuck (2005)
- Life's So Hard (2006)
- Normal Bias (2007)
- Linda Lovelace for President (2008)
- Losing Salt (2009)
- Pop! Pop! Pop! (2010)
- Motherfuckers Be Bullshittin' (2011)
- Popular Music (2013)
- Exactly Where I Am (2015)
- Unicorns Get More Bacon (2016)
- Obscurity (2018)
- low fidelity (or "how i spent the nervous breakdown") (2021)
- Thanatophobia (2022)
- Please Believe In Yourself, Alright? (2023)
- Flowers For Analog (2024)
- Steamed Hams (2025)

=== Extended plays ===
- HRG – Vol. 1 (2003)
- Recorded Sound (2011)
- Actual Bubblegum Pop (2012)
- Half Serious Half Kidding (2017)
- the intermission (or "let's all kill each other") (2021)
- the intermission... continues? (or "let's all kill each other again") (2021)
- the intermission mourns (or "goodnight papa nez") (2021)
- Steamed Clams (2025)
- Neat Protest (2025)

=== Cover albums ===
- Shock Treatment (Interpretations) (2005) (covers of songs from the film Shock Treatment)
- Share the Covers! (2007)
- Share the Covers! (Part Two) (2010)
- Share the Covers! (Part Three) (2010)
- Good Clean Fun: Marc With a C Sings The Monkees! (2012) (the Monkees cover album)
- Share the Covers! (Part Four) (2014)
- 25 Lo-Fi Cover Songs (2015)
- Share the Covers! (Part Five) (2020)
- John Who? (2022) (John Entwistle solo songs cover album)

=== Live albums ===
- One Planned Slip... Live! (2003)
- Another Planned Slip (2006)
- Music From "Sex Times Three" (2009)
- The Third Planned Slip... Live (2010)
- Live at Nerdapalooza 2011 (2012)
- The Real Live Sound Of Marc With a C (2014)
- Cark (2016)

=== Compilations ===
- What the Hell is Wrong with Marc with a C? (2007)
- RetroLowFi: 10 Years Of Marc With a C (2009)
- An Introduction To Marc With a C (2014)
- The Obscurity Trilogy (2019)
- Maybe It'll Be Good: The Best Of Marc With a C! (2019)
- Marc With a C(D): A 25th Anniversary Sampler (2024)

=== Producer ===
- It's a Wonderful Night by The Left Joins (2023)
- Self-Entitlement by The Left Joins (2024)
