= WarGames: The Dead Code =

2008 American direct-to-video thriller film by Stuart Gillard

- Official DVD cover
- Directed by: Stuart Gillard
- Screenplay by: Randall Badat
- Story by: Rob Kerchner; Randall Badat
- Based on: Characters by: Lawrence Lasker; Walter F. Parkes
- Produced by: Irene Litinsky
- Starring: Matt Lanter; Amanda Walsh; Nicolas Wright; Chuck Shamata; Maxim Roy; Gary Reineke; Vlasta Vrána; Colm Feore
- Cinematography: Bruce Chun
- Edited by: Robin Russell
- Music by: John Van Tongeren
- Production companies: Metro-Goldwyn-Mayer; Muse Entertainment
- Distributed by: 20th Century Fox Home Entertainment
- Release date: July 29, 2008
- Running time: 100 minutes
- Country: United States
- Language: English

WarGames: The Dead Code is a 2008 American direct-to-video thriller film written by Randall Badat and Rob Kerchner and directed by Stuart Gillard. It is the sequel to the 1983 film WarGames, starring Matt Lanter, Amanda Walsh and Colm Feore. Production began on November 20, 2006, in Montreal, and the film was released on DVD on July 29, 2008, by MGM's home video distributor 20th Century Fox Home Entertainment. According to MGM's original press release, the film is budgeted as one in a series of direct-to-DVD sequels.

== Plot ==
Will Farmer's (Matt Lanter) neighbor Massude asks Will for help with a computer problem. Will steals $5,000 from Massude's account to gamble on an online gaming site featuring games based on terrorist attacks. He ends up winning $25,000. The game is a sophisticated piece of U.S. government spyware run by an advanced artificial intelligence system called RIPLEY, designed to find terrorists.

Will later returns home to find Massude under arrest. Massude gives Will an envelope full of cash to pay for a plane ticket. Unknown to all, RIPLEY is misinterpreting the data and overreacting to the situation. On his arrival to the airport, Will finds a large number of security guards. He evades them and meets up with his friend Annie.

Will manages to crack the government network, only to be found by the police and a mysterious man in an overcoat. The couple are chased by the police until they get lost in the subway system. They escape and meet the man in the overcoat who says he nearly started World War III. He is revealed to be Professor Falken, who had helped to design RIPLEY. They travel to a power plant outside a dam. There, Falken shows them the WOPR (War Operation Plan Response) from the original WarGames film, which now operates the power grid. Falken reactivates WOPR with his backdoor password: "Joshua". Meanwhile, RIPLEY hijacks a Predator drone with missiles and a nuclear warhead on board.

Falken instructs WOPR to attack RIPLEY with a faux script full of cultural references. WOPR floods RIPLEY's system with games, but RIPLEY shuts down and reboots to clear the attack. RIPLEY uses the Predator drone to destroy the facility housing WOPR. Will and Annie flee the facility before it is destroyed. Falken remains in the building.

The couple is captured and taken to the room where RIPLEY is stored, where they discover that Falken has transferred WOPR's program to them. They use WOPR and Internet users to stage another denial of service attack. RIPLEY attempts to self-destruct by launching a nuclear warhead at Washington, D.C. WOPR again attacks RIPLEY, playing through two nuclear attack scenarios that result in total annihilation. The third scenario presented is a nuclear attack on Washington, D.C. Having learned the concept of futility, RIPLEY stops responding after the scenario is played out.

After RIPLEY relinquishes control, Will asks WOPR if he really would have launched the missiles if RIPLEY had decided to continue playing. WOPR replies, "Yes, the human race is finished." He then adds, "That was humor."

== Cast ==
- Matt Lanter as Will Farmer
- Amanda Walsh as Annie D'Mateo
- Colm Feore as T. Kenneth Hassert, and Voice of WOPR ("Joshua")
- Chuck Shamata as Bill Carter
- Maxim Roy as Tina Rashe
- Nicolas Wright as Dennis Nichols
- Gary Reineke as Stephen Falken
- Susan Glover as Gail Farmer
- Trevor Hayes as Agent Aaron Scott
- Claudia Ferri as Agent Bolton
- Vlasta Vrána as Ivan Prokosh
- Ricky Mabe as Newman
- Claudia Black as Voice of RIPLEY
- Russell Yuen as David Chen
- Robert Higden as Mr. Baron
- John Maclaren as Norman Paget
- John Koensgen as Martin Cavanaugh
- Alberto Delburgo as Sayid Massude
- Lucinda Davis as Joleen Dupree

== Reception ==
On Rotten Tomatoes, of three reviews listed, two were negative and one was positive.

Rossiter Drake of the San Francisco Examiner gave it 2 out of 4, and wrote: "Keeps the formula topical, replacing Soviet aggressors with cyber-savvy terrorists, but the renovations end there."
