= Sam Barlow (game designer) =

British video game designer

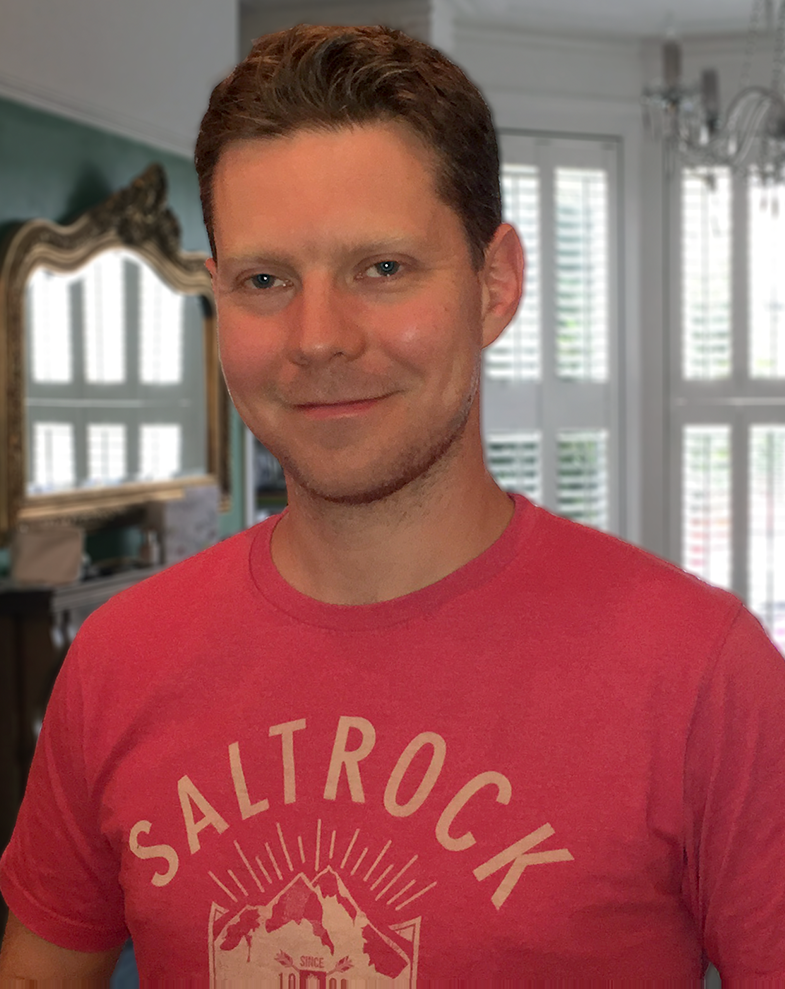
- Barlow in 2015
- Education: University of Bristol
- Occupation: Video game designer
- Years active: 1999–present
- Employer(s): Strategy.com (2000); MicroStrategy (2000); Vitalspring (2000–2001); Climax Studios (2002–2014); Eko (2016–2017); Half Mermaid (2017–present)
- Notable work: Her Story; Telling Lies; Immortality

Sam Barlow is a British video game designer, best known as the writer and designer of Her Story, the two British Silent Hill games (Silent Hill: Origins and Silent Hill: Shattered Memories), Telling Lies and Immortality. He previously worked as a game director at Climax Studios before leaving in 2014 to become an indie game developer. He published his first independent game, Her Story, in June 2015, his first venture in a genre he has called the "desktop thriller". In 2017, he founded Half Mermaid, a video game production company based in New York.

== Interactive fiction ==
Barlow was active in the interactive fiction scene of the late 1990s, most notably releasing the game Aisle in 1999. It won the XYZZY Award for Best Use of Medium. Like his later Silent Hill games, Aisle features a psychologically damaged viewpoint character, a contemporary setting and a positive meaning at its heart.

In March 2016, during the Game Developers Conference, Barlow announced he had joined the interactive media firm Interlude, later rebranded as Eko, to help them develop an interactive media reboot of the 1983 film WarGames. The work #WarGames launched in early 2018.

== Influences ==
Barlow frequently cites novelists and film directors as having influenced his work. He claims that Hitchcock, Luis Buñuel and J. G. Ballard influenced his work on Silent Hill: Shattered Memories. Both Silent Hill titles reference Shakespeare (Silent Hill: Origins features a performance of The Tempest, while Silent Hill: Shattered Memories has multiple references to Twelfth Night). He has also been inspired by David Lynch, Mark Z. Danielewski, Paul Auster, Shirley Jackson, The Exorcist and Gene Wolfe. Consistently his most frequently cited influence is Hitchcock, for example: "I bored everyone with Hitchcock and talking about his techniques and his ideas of suspense" and "Hitchcock said that all horror goes back to childhood, that's why it's a universal thing – it's a fundamental". Barlow cites Cronenberg's The Fly and Paul Schrader's Cat People as showing how best to reboot an existing story.

== Video games ==
Year	Title	Role	Publisher
1999	Aisle	Sole developer	Sam Barlow
2004	Serious Sam: Next Encounter	Designer	Global Star Software
2006	Crusty Demons	Lead designer	Deep Silver
2006	Who Wants to Be a Millionaire: Party Edition	Concept developer	Eidos Interactive
2007	Ghost Rider	Lead designer	2K Games
2007	Silent Hill: Origins	Lead designer and writer	Konami Digital Entertainment
2009	Silent Hill: Shattered Memories	Lead designer and writer	Konami Digital Entertainment
2015	Her Story	Director and writer	Sam Barlow
2018	#WarGames	Creative lead	Eko
2019	Telling Lies	Director and writer	Annapurna Interactive
2022	A Memoir Blue	Project executive director	Annapurna Interactive
2022	Immortality	Director and writer	Half Mermaid Productions; Netflix
2028	Precognition	Director and writer	Kinetic Publishing
TBA	Project D	Director and writer	Half Mermaid Productions

=== Cancelled games ===
Title	Role
Elveon	Lead designer and writer
Brahms PD	Lead designer and writer
Silent Hill: Cold Heart	Lead designer and writer
Legacy of Kain: Dead Sun	Director
Project B	Director
