= Aisle (video game) =

1999 video game

- Developer: Sam Barlow
- Engine: Z-machine
- Platform: Platform-independent
- Release: 1999
- Genre: Interactive fiction
- Mode: Single-player

Aisle is a 1999 interactive fiction video game whose major innovation is to allow only a single move and offer from it over a hundred possible outcomes. It is notable for introducing and popularizing the one move genre.

== Plot ==
The main character is a man standing in the pasta aisle of a modern supermarket. The opening text states:

You've had a hard day and the last thing you need is this: shopping. Luckily, the place is pretty empty and you're progressing rapidly.

On to the next aisle.

The character's interest is piqued by the gnocchi he sees in the pasta aisle and a few other items are noted. Then the player is asked to choose how to proceed. Based on this input the game will reveal the character's story (and back story). Alec Meer describes how things may proceed from here:

So what do you do? Buy pasta, think about Gnocchi, try to talk to the woman, take your clothes off, start shouting… Some endings are moving, others tragic, others funny, others lurid, others mysterious. It rewards experimentation, logic, lateral thinking and craziness in equal measure.

Crucially, a number of the less eventful endings provide hints as to your character's backstory, which in turn fill your mind with possibilities as to new actions you could attempt. Hence, Groundhog Day – each attempt you make at the game is informed by the events of the previous one(s). You revert to exactly the same situation every time, but though the world hasn't changed, your knowledge has – and with that comes an uncanny sense of progress.

However, Aisle's introduction does point out that: "there are many stories and not all of them are about the same man".

== Reception ==
It was well received on release with players finding its approach fascinating.

On Rock, Paper, Shotgun, Adam Smith called Aisle "one of my favourite explorations of interactive storytelling, seemingly so simple yet capable of telling so many stories that are distorted and/or clarified by the nature of the medium" and Alec Meer said that it was a "fascinating, deeply affecting experiment". On Reviews from Trotting Kripps, Ben Parrish felt Aisle was "flawlessly implemented, wonderfully written, and intensely evocative".

Less impressed was Duncan Stevens, writing in SPAG Magazine. Whilst he observed it was "one of the most unusual works to hit the IF community in quite some time" he felt that "Its effectiveness depends on whether it makes an emotional impact, however, and without such an impact, it's a dreary experience at best."

On Destructoid Anthony Burch said Aisle is one of the three text games he has fallen in love with, describing it as "one of the shortest text adventures ever, and also one of the longest".

In his dissertation "Command Lines: Aesthetics and Technique in Interactive Fiction and New Media", Jeremy Douglass explored the themes and construction of Aisle and concluded that it has a "deeper and fairly consistent morality: physical actions are easy, but social outcomes are hard, and the important thing is respect, honesty, appropriate listening, and the power and responsibility of negative and positive thinking."

== Awards ==
Aisle was nominated in the XYZZY Awards of 1999, for Best Story, Best Individual PC and won the award for Best Use of Medium.

In the IFDB "Interactive Fiction Top 50 Of All Time (2011 Edition)", Aisle placed 22nd
