= Legacy of Kain: Dead Sun =

- The protagonist, Gein/Asher
- Developer: Climax Studios (Note: Psyonix was developing the game's multiplayer component.)
- Publisher: Square Enix
- Director: Sam Barlow
- Writer: James Smythe
- Series: Legacy of Kain
- Engine: Unreal Engine 3
- Platforms: Microsoft Windows, PlayStation 3, PlayStation 4, Xbox 360
- Release: Cancelled
- Genre: Action-adventure
- Modes: Single-player, multiplayer

Legacy of Kain: Dead Sun is a cancelled action-adventure video game that was in development by Climax Studios for Square Enix Europe, with an accompanying multiplayer component developed separately by Psyonix. Conceived as the sixth entry in the Legacy of Kain series, Dead Sun entered production for Microsoft Windows, PlayStation 3, PlayStation 4, and Xbox 360. It was cancelled in 2012 after three years of development. Square Enix Europe and Psyonix salvaged the planned multiplayer mode, which they reconceptualized as Nosgoth, a standalone free-to-play title.

A poster at NeoGAF, an internet forum, unearthed Dead Sun in an extensive report published shortly after Nosgoth's announcement in 2013. The report publicized media and accounts from sources in Climax Studios. Square Enix Europe subsequently acknowledged the scrapped project with the conclusion that Dead Sun "just wasn't the right game, at the right time". Several articles were published later that year which revealed gameplay footage and concept art. Video game publications responded negatively to news of the cancellation, and most commentators expressed their sustained interest in a single-player revival of the franchise.

== Gameplay ==
Leaks described Dead Sun as a story-based action-adventure inspired by Legacy of Kain: Soul Reaver (1999) (the second installment in the series) and Nintendo's The Legend of Zelda. The game featured an open world, and combined cinematic, violent combat with dungeon crawls, puzzles, and boss encounters. Links to past Legacy of Kain entries figured into the design, such as the shifting mechanic of the Soul Reaver titles, which enabled players to alternate between two planes of existence.

Videos of the project's vertical slice presentation demonstrated the codex – an in-game encyclopedia supplying background history on the world – and a power-up system, in which collectible souls could be exchanged for upgrades to assist in battle or exploration.

== Plot ==
Dead Sun was set in the far future of the Legacy of Kain world, long after the events of Soul Reaver and Legacy of Kain: Defiance (2003). Players would control new protagonists Gein, a vampire, and Asher, a human, whose souls became intertwined as they travelled the land of Nosgoth.

According to leaked material, Gein's/Asher's character arc would escalate from a quest for revenge to a journey which would decide the fate of the world. The plot concerned the mystery surrounding a vampire child, and revolved around the character of The Elder God. Thematically, it focused on religion.

Square Enix Europe community manager George Kelion said that the game would have rebooted or retconned the series' established mythology, and only utilized returning characters "in the broadest possible terms." Kelion likened its prospective impact on the fiction to that of the Star Trek reboot series.

The Hylden race did not appear in the story. Concept art indicated that the Silenced Cathedral from Soul Reaver would reappear.

== Development ==
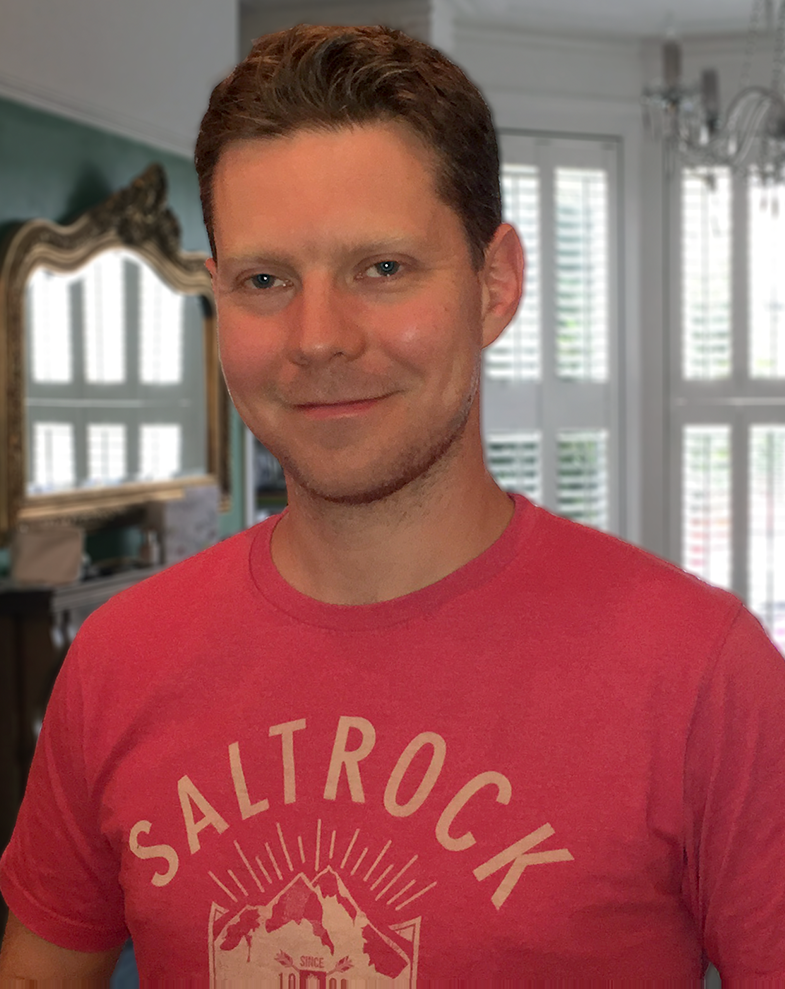
Legacy of Kain: Dead Sun director Sam Barlow.

=== Production ===
Publisher Eidos Interactive assigned series creators Crystal Dynamics to the Tomb Raider franchise before Defiance shipped, and writer and director Amy Hennig, unable to proceed with Legacy of Kain or lead Tomb Raider: Legend, departed to join Naughty Dog. In 2004, a sequel – Legacy of Kain: The Dark Prophecy – was delegated to Ritual Entertainment, but Eidos cancelled the title after a few months of work. However, both Eidos and Crystal Dynamics representatives frequently recognized fan demand for another game, and considered outsourcing the task to other teams.

Square Enix purchased Eidos in 2009, and the newly merged entity, Square Enix Europe, selected Climax Studios – who had recently completed development of Konami's Silent Hill: Shattered Memories – to press on with a Legacy of Kain project for seventh generation consoles.

Leaks alleged that preproduction on Dead Sun began circa 2009-2010, under the codename "Black Cloth". The title's budget was small at first, but in its final incarnation it had achieved AAA classification, and targeted release as a PlayStation 4 launch game. Crystal Dynamics supervised Climax, while Square Enix Europe required that the finished product comprise a single-player and multiplayer package. They recruited Psyonix to build the latter, then codenamed War for Nosgoth. Both teams made use of the Unreal Engine 3, and shared a unified art direction, but the two modes were otherwise entirely distinct. The publisher mandated the decision to introduce a new main character (in lieu of series protagonist Kain), requesting that Climax's story showcase a distant time period. Director Sam Barlow would reflect: "we took a lot of things we'd learned from Shattered Memories and were doing them on a much bigger scale, although more subtly."

Square Enix Europe cancelled Dead Sun in 2012, after motion capture and casting had begun, but before the project reached full production. Psyonix continued to develop the War for Nosgoth multiplayer, now disconnected from the original game.

Hints of the game had first emerged in 2011, when Game Revolution's Daniel Bischoff cited a consumer survey to determine the best of four possible names tailored for a Legacy of Kain product: Obsidian Blood, Obsidian Sun, Dead Sun or Revenant. In 2012, Patrick Garratt of VG247 relayed rumors of a Soul Reaver reboot with a "new art direction" then underway at Crystal Dynamics. Still, no statement occurred until 2013, when Official Xbox Magazine Edwin Evans-Thirlwell discovered a Legacy of Kain storyboard by Passion Pictures, and others found evidence of War for Nosgoth in the Steam Database, Advanced Micro Devices' patch logs, a newly registered domain, and a LinkedIn profile. Square Enix Europe's George Kelion confirmed the existence of a multiplayer title named Nosgoth, promising more information at a later date.

=== Reveal ===
Shortly after Kelion's statement, Legacy of Kain fan Mama Robotnik revealed Dead Sun to the public, posting media from the scrapped game and an extensive account of its development at NeoGAF. Kelion responded by confirming that Dead Sun existed and that Nosgoth was intended to be its multiplayer companion game, but said Nosgoth is a separate project which has "grown in size and scope since its initial conception", featuring "different mechanics, characters, levels and gameplay". He rejected the idea that it is "the multiplayer component of Dead Sun pulled out and fleshed out".

Several Climax employees corroborated the project's existence at their résumés, portfolios, and blogs. Months later, in a follow-up post, Mama Robotnik highlighted other assets, among them concept and trailer art by Flipbook Studio, and in-game footage displaying the user interface.

== Reaction ==
The report surrounding Dead Sun and Nosgoth attracted criticism from the video game press. GameRanx's Ryan Parreno regarded the junking as "a genuine waste". Writing for Rely on Horror, C. J. Melendez said, "in an alternate universe, [Dead Sun and Nosgoth] would switch places. I know that may seem a bit harsh, but fans have waited a long time for a proper singleplayer entry in the Legacy of Kain series." He clarified that "Nosgoth may very well be a good game, but it's fair to say that it's probably not going to scratch that itch that fans have had since Defiance." Also on Nosgoth, TechnologyTell's Jenni Lada commented, "I can't bring myself to show any kind of support for what could end up being a free-to-play, cash grab, knowing that Square Enix canned Legacy of Kain: Dead Sun and supported this instead." Scott Tailford of WhatCulture later included the title as #9 on his list of "11 Hugely-Anticipated Video Games You Won't Believe Got Cancelled", writing that "for fans that have stuck by the series for almost two decades it's completely maddening".
