= Chris Zabriskie =

American composer and musician (born 1982)

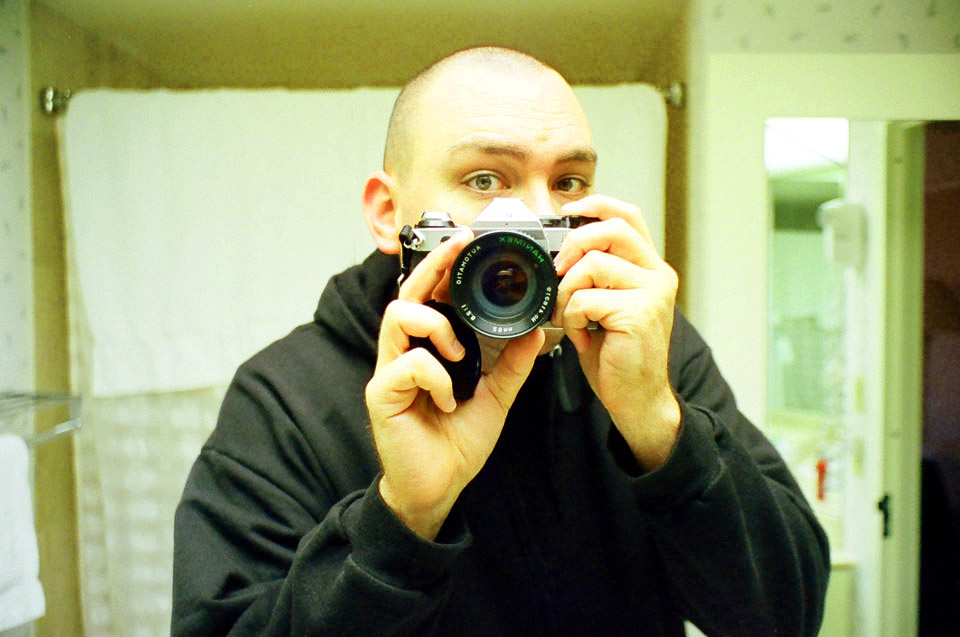
- Zabriskie in 2008

Background information
- Born: March 10, 1982 (age 44); Olympia, Washington, United States
- Instruments: Vocals; piano; keyboards; guitar; drums
- Years active: 2001 – present
- Formerly of: lo-fi is sci-fi
- Website: www.chriszabriskie.com

Chris Zabriskie (born March 10, 1982) is an American composer and musician.

== Biography ==
Chris Zabriskie got his musical start in noise-rock duo Struggleburger with musician David Joslyn but went solo unexpectedly at a show in 2001 when he did not show up. Between 2006 and 2009, Zabriskie and Marc with a C released four albums under the name lo-fi is sci-fi.

In 2009, he turned his attention towards instrumental music, first releasing The Dark Glow of the Mountains. The album's stark electronic minimalism was a departure from his previous work. Two more instrumental albums, I Am a Man Who Will Fight for Your Honor and Preludes followed in the same year. He continues to release new ambient music on a regular basis.

Zabriskie self-releases his albums on his website and is also a vocal supporter of BitTorrent and file sharing. In the past, he has admitted to leaking his own records to various torrent sites in advance of their release dates. As of March 2009, Zabriskie offers free downloads of all of his music. In 2011, Zabriskie joined WMFU's Free Music Archive and changed the Creative Commons license on his music to be much more permissive and open.

Zabriskie is also a filmmaker, with producing and editing work including music videos for John Vanderslice as well as various short films and many of his own music videos. In 2020, Zabriskie designed and performed video visuals for the Cupcakes 20th anniversary reunion performance at Metro Chicago.

== Personal Life ==
Zabriskie currently resides in Brooklyn, New York City.

== Discography ==
- The Dark Glow of the Mountains (2009)
- I Am a Man Who Will Fight for Your Honor (2009)
- Preludes (2009)
- Vendaface (2010)
- Stunt Island (2011)
- Divider (2011)
- Undercover Vampire Policeman (2012)
- Reappear (2012)
- Cylinders (2014)
- Direct to Video (2015)
- Thoughtless (2015)
- Music from Neptune Flux (2016)
- It’s a Wonderful Jaws (2018)
- I Made This While You Were Asleep (2020)
- Abandon Babylon (2021)
- Soft Rock Champion (2022)
- Angie's Sunday Service (2022)
- Short Songs 010923 - 030923 (2023)
- Mayor Feedback (2025)
- I Want You to Think About Me (2026)

Released under the name lo-fi is sci-fi:

- The Black Hole (2006)
- We Were Wrong (2007)
- O Great Queen Electric, What Do You Have Waiting for Me? (2008)
- This Silent Bloody Night (2008)
