= Eko (media production company) =

Media and technology company

Eko, formerly known as Interlude, is a media and technology company that develops production and web distribution of interactive multimedia videos. Interlude was originally founded in 2010 and was rebranded as Eko in December 2016.

== Technology ==
Eko software constructs audiovisual multimedia within which users have options of streaming choices from a traversable video tree. The software supports changes in viewer perspective and narrative branching through multiple video streams. or for narrative-branching. The software was used for the Sony produced music video Bob Dylan's Like A Rolling Stone.

== Structure ==
Eko was founded by Israeli rock musician Yoni Bloch. Eko is based in New York and Tel Aviv, the company has received investment from firms including Sequoia Capital, Intel Capital, and Walmart.
