= Viva Seifert =

English musician and actress (born 1972)

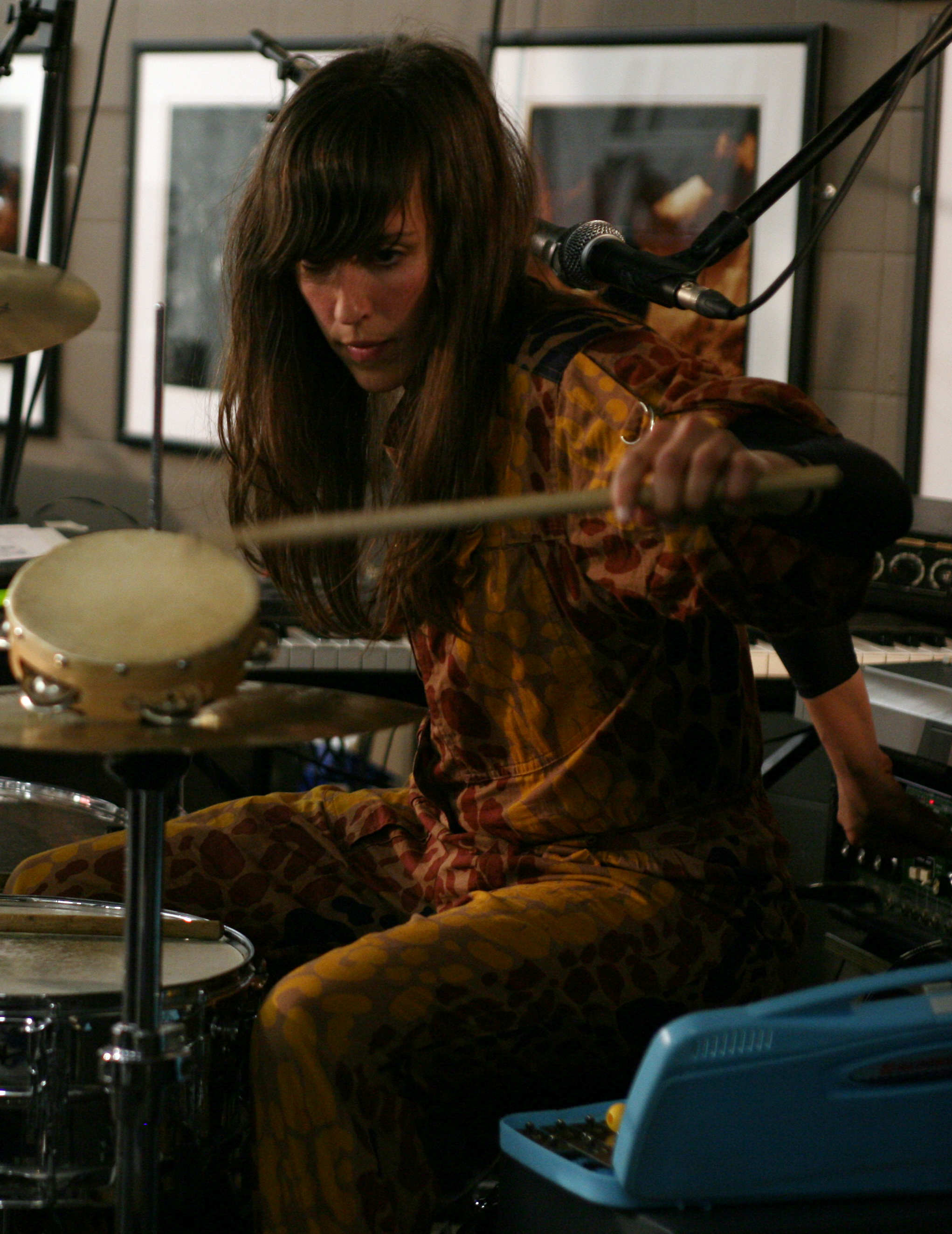
- Seifert performing with Joe Gideon & the Shark at the Rough Trade East record store in 2009
- Born: 15 April 1972 (age 54); London, England
- Occupations: Musician; actress; gymnast
- Years active: 1990–present
- Spouse: Mark "Arp" Cleveland
- Children: 2
- Musical career
- Genres: Rock; pop; electronic
- Instruments: Vocals; drums; guitar; keyboards
- Labels: Bella Union; Bronzerat Records
- Member of: Joe Gideon & the Shark; Lunge
- Formerly of: Bikini Atoll

Viva Seifert (born 15 April 1972) is a British musician, actress, and former gymnast. A multi-instrumentalist, she is a founding member of the band Bikini Atoll, and the duos Joe Gideon & the Shark and Lunge. As an actress, she led the indie game Her Story, receiving accolades at The Game Awards and the New York Game Awards.

== Early life ==
Seifert was born in London, England, and currently resides in Cornwall. Her brother is Gideon Joel Seifert, known professionally as Joe Gideon. Her early aspirations were in rhythmic gymnastics.

At the age of 18, Seifert competed at the 1990 Commonwealth Games and finished fourth in the individual competition, winning bronze medals in the hoop and ribbon disciplines. She went on to participate in the 1992 Summer Olympics, finishing in 29th place in the individual rhythmic gymnastics competition.

== Music career ==
In 1999, Seifert and her brother, Gideon Joel Seifert, formed the band Bikini Atoll along with two other members, Ché Albrighton and Bastian Juel. In the band, Seifert was a keyboardist. In 2004, they were signed to the Bella Union label, and they released their debut studio album, Moratoria, which was received positively by critics, with The Independent describing it as "...an awesome, soul-searching slice of sprawling Americana." In 2005, they released their second studio album, Liar's Exit, which received positive reviews. In 2006, Bikini Atoll disbanded, and further activities were ceased.

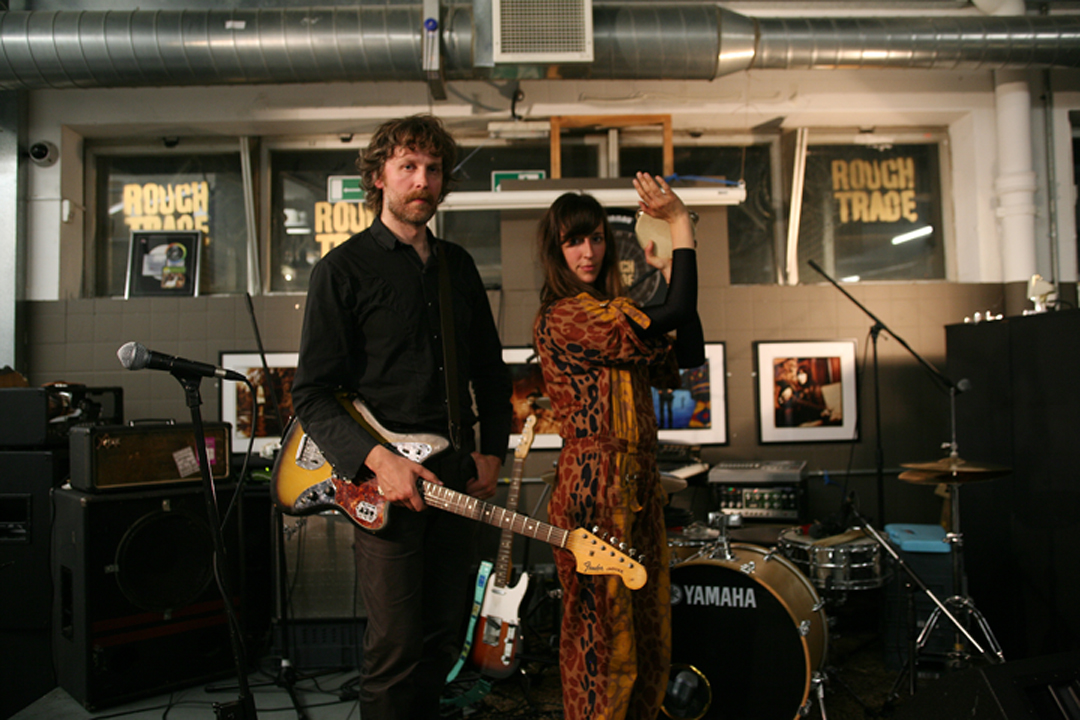
Seifert and her brother Joe Gideon in 2009, who form the duo Joe Gideon & the Shark

After the split of Bikini Atoll, Seifert and her brother formed the duo Joe Gideon & the Shark. They released their debut album, Harum Scarum in 2010, which earned a positive reception from critics. Online magazine Louder Than War described the album as "a hell of a find. An extraordinarily colourful collection of psychedelic stories – demented yet sympathetic eulogies to a bunch of fictitious weirdos, set to a fashionably succinct swamp-rock beat." Writing for Clash magazine, Mike Diver deemed Seifert "one of the fiercest, most technically gifted rock 'n' roll drummers around – it's unsettling even to see her crack a smile." Clash also said that she handled her work with "flamboyant precision".

In 2013, Joe Gideon & the Shark released their second album Freakish through Bronze Rat Records. The Quietus said that "…Viva's visual drumming style and Joe's control of any number of effects mangling, fuzzing and boosting an arsenal of crunching riffs to produce an enticing audio-visual package."

In 2022, Seifert formed the indie electronica musical duo Lunge (stylized in all caps) with Mark "Arp" Cleveland, who was previously a drummer for Archie Bronson Outfit. They released their debut single "Heavy Golden Swim" in March 2022. In July 2022, it was announced that Lunge would make their live debut at the End of the Road Festival in September of that same year. They released their debut extended play EP1 on April 7, 2023, which was preceded by the single "This Idle Motion".

== Acting career ==
Seifert was a part of WeatherGens, a group of several actors who played various characters made to represent the weather in PowerGen's sponsorship of the ITV National Weather between November 20, 1996, and October 19, 2001. She portrayed Aurora, who represented the hot and dry weather.

In 2009, Seifert was set to portray Lydia in the video game Legacy of Kain: Dead Sun, which was directed by her future collaborator Sam Barlow. While it was heavily publicized and anticipated, it was controversially cancelled in 2012.

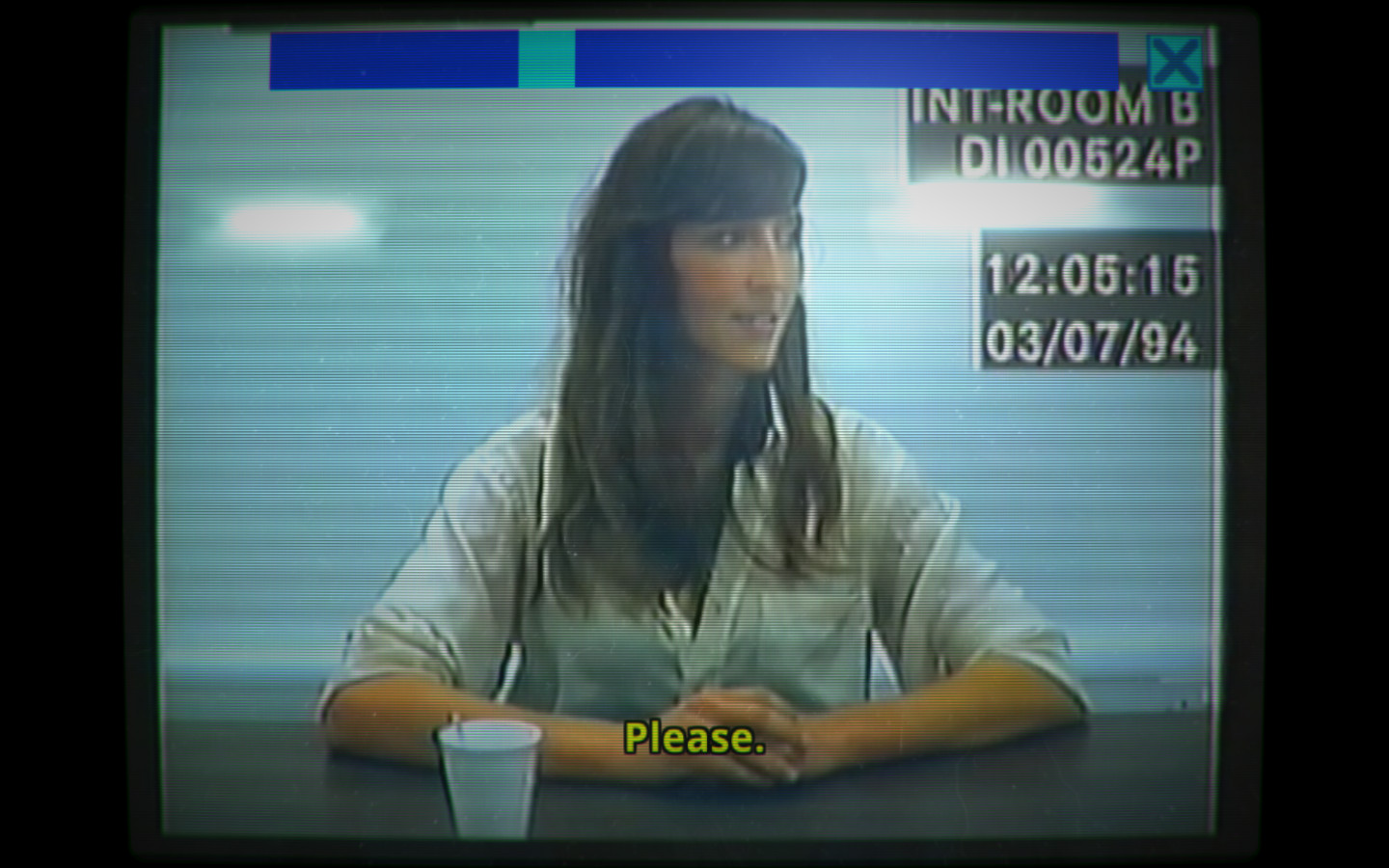
Seifert in Her Story (2015)

In 2015, Seifert was cast in the video game Her Story, a crime fiction video game by Sam Barlow, where she portrays the role of Hannah Smith; later on in the game, it is suggested that the character has a twin named Eve, also portrayed by Seifert. Along with acting in the game, she also had a hand in the soundtrack, performing the ballad "The Twa Sisters" and helping alter the music. After working with Barlow on Legacy of Kain: Dead Sun, he contacted Seifert for the role after observing her work, stating that she was "very good at picking up a line and intuitively pulling a lot of the subtext into her performance". Several edits were made to the script, reducing it from 300 pages to 80 pages, before he offered the part to Seifert. Filming for Her Story occurred in her residence, Cornwall, over five days. She stated that the role was difficult to portray, commenting that shooting was "intense" and "rather exhausting". She further said that she felt pressure after realizing "the whole game is hinging" on her acting.

Upon release, Her Story opened to instant and critical success, with critics praising the game as well as Seifert's performance. Justin Clark from GameSpot wrote that her performance "anchored" the game, and Andy Keller of PC Gamer stated that her performance was "understated, realistic, and complex". Joe Donnelly of Digital Spy believed her acting had the potential to inspire similar roles. Todd Martens of the Los Angeles Times praised her acting, and Adam Cook of GodIsAGeek deemed her performance "stunning". Rich Stanton of The Guardian wrote that "what seals the deal is a wide-ranging performance from Viva Seifert that funnels her character’s inner life into hundreds of intense vignettes" and further credited her for creating "a fictional character with something of the same allure: clearly very intelligent, clearly not telling the whole truth, and full of physical quirks. ... Seifert’s delivery is usually matter-of-fact and emotionally convincing." Chris Kohler of WIRED said "Seifert's performance is so captivating that I couldn't imagine this game working any other way." Katie Smith of Adventure Gamers wrote that she was convincing in the role, and praised her for paying attention to the small details, such as her body language. Polygon listed Hannah Smith on its list of the "70 Best Video Game Characters" and stated that Seifert played the role "superbly".

For the role, Seifert won the Game Award for Best Performance in 2015, where she was mistakenly credited for having appeared in The Witcher 3, which spawned several internet memes and earned the organization criticism. At the 5th New York Game Awards, the New York Videogame Critics Circle awarded Seifert the Great White Way Award for Best Acting in a Game. She was a runner-up for the Golden Joystick Performance of the Year Award. At the 12th British Academy Games Awards, critics were surprised to see that Seifert had not been nominated for Best Performer. The actress stated in an interview with BBC that "I was disappointed I can't lie. It was all leading up to this moment, but now there's more awards, actors are taking it [gaming] more seriously." Seifert also presented an award at the ceremony.

In 2018, Seifert voiced the character Merethiel in the video game RuneScape. Also in 2018, she made a guest appearance as Rachel on the British television series Delicious. The same year, Seifert starred in the short film Miss White as the titular character.

In 2024, Seifert was cast in Iain Forsyth and Jane Pollard's film The Extraordinary Miss Flower, which is about Emilíana Torrini. She performs as a dancer with Torrini and Caroline Catz, and musicians Nick Cave and Mark Monero. She detailed the project as "a performance piece, dreamy and like a pleasant trip involving music and choreography. It is very theatrical and unique." It was released in the United Kingdom in 2025. It is her first feature film role.

== Personal life ==
Seifert is married to musician Mark "Arp" Cleveland—once a part of Archie Bronson Outfit—with whom she has two children. Her daughter, Tipper Seifert-Cleveland, is also an actress. She keeps a low media profile, rarely accepting interviews, making public appearances, or speaking of her personal life outside of her creative ventures.

== Discography ==
With Bikini Atoll

- Moratoria (2004)
- Liar's Exit (2005)

With Joe Gideon & the Shark

- Harum Scarum (2010)
- Freakish (2013)

== Filmography ==
Year	Title	Role	Notes
1996–2001	ITV Weather	Aurora	Main role
2008	Would I Lie to You?	Herself	Episode: "02x01"
2012	Legacy of Kain: Dead Sun	Lydia	Cancelled video game
2015	Her Story	Hannah Smith	Video game
2018	Delicious	Rachel	Episode: "The Heart"
2018	RuneScape	Merethiel	Video game
2019	Miss White	Miss White	Short film
2024	The Extraordinary Miss Flower	Dancer	Feature film

== Awards and nominations ==
Awards and nominations received by Viva Seifert
Award	Year (Note: Indicates the year of ceremony. Each year is linked to the article about the awards held that year, wherever possible.)	Category	Nominated work	Result	Ref.
Golden Joystick Awards	2015	Performance of the Year	Her Story	Nominated	
The Game Awards	2015	Best Performance	Her Story	Won	
New York Game Awards	2016	Great White Way Award for Best Acting in a Game	Her Story	Won	
NAVGTR Awards	2016	Outstanding Performance in a Drama	Her Story	Nominated	
