= New York Game Awards =

Annual American video games award show

- Awarded for: Contributions in the video game industry
- Venue: SVA Theatre
- Country: United States
- Presented by: New York Videogame Critics Circle
- First award: February 12, 2012
- Website: nygamecritics.com/awards

The New York Game Awards is an annual award show honoring video games by nonprofit New York Videogame Critics Circle (NYVGCC). The first awards were held in 2012, honoring previous year's contributions to the video game industry and showcases the group's education work with underserved communities. New York Videogame Critics Circle's stated goals are to promote awareness of, and education for, video games writing and journalism in the New York City area.

== History ==
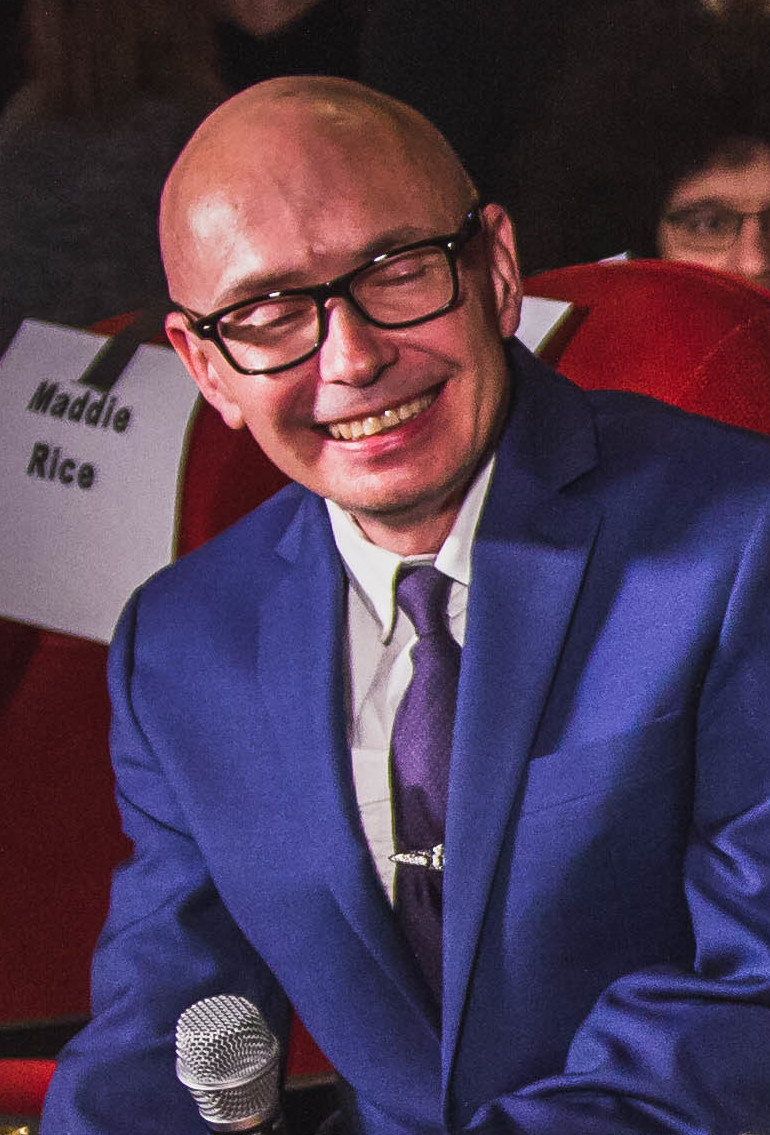
Harold Goldberg, founder of the New York Videogame Critics Circle, pictured in 2019

The New York Videogame Critics Circle (NYVGCC) was founded in 2011 by writer Harold Goldberg, along with inaugural members Evan Narcisse, Tracey John, Russ Frushtick, and Andrew Yoon. Goldberg received more attention than expected from his book All Your Base Are Belong to Us (2011), including game and film offers. He decided to create an advocacy group in New York, a region he felt was disadvantaged due to its distance from the West Coast. The NYVGCC was created to advocate for its members, and provides classes and mentoring to underserved portions of the New York City community. Its stated goals are to promote awareness of, and education for, video games writing and journalism in the New York City area.

Beginning in 2012, the NYVGCC has hosted an annual awards show that distributes trophies to game studios, individual game contributors, and game journalists. The first awards show was held in 2012 as a collaboration with New York University's Game Center. Since then, the NYVGCC has held annual award ceremonies and has incorporated live music, trailer premieres, and hosting by members of The Daily Show writing staff. Work on the ceremonies begins in February, shortly after the preceding show, and escalates more after Labor Day in September.

In 2019, former Nintendo of America president Reggie Fils-Aimé joined the NYVGCC's board of directors to help Goldberg and the group continue its outreach to the DreamYard Prep School, and new initiatives such as classes in Bronxworks network of homeless shelters. In July 2023, Ryan O'Callaghan replaced Goldberg as the board's executive director, while Goldberg remains president.

== Ceremonies ==
| # | Date | Big Apple Award for Game of the Year | Host(s) | Venue |
|---|---|---|---|---|
| 1st | February 2, 2012 | The Elder Scrolls V: Skyrim | Logan Cunningham | New York University |
| 2nd | February 5, 2013 | The Walking Dead | Daniel Radosh | New York University |
| 3rd | February 11, 2014 | The Last of Us | Daniel Radosh | New York University |
| 4th | February 16, 2015 | Wolfenstein: The New Order | Daniel Radosh | Villain |
| 5th | February 9, 2016 | The Witcher 3: Wild Hunt | Owen Parsons | Villain |
| 6th | January 19, 2017 | Uncharted 4: A Thief's End | Devin Delliquanti | Abron Arts Center |
| 7th | January 24, 2018 | The Legend of Zelda: Breath of the Wild | Devin Delliquanti | Abron Arts Center |
| 8th | January 22, 2019 | God of War | Devin Delliquanti | SVA Theatre |
| 9th | January 21, 2020 | The Outer Worlds | Devin Delliquanti | SVA Theatre |
| 10th | January 26, 2021 | Hades | Reggie Fils-Aimé | Virtual |
| 11th | February 1, 2022 | Psychonauts 2 | Reggie Fils-Aimé; Harold Goldberg | Virtual |
| 12th | January 17, 2023 | Elden Ring | Reggie Fils-Aimé; Harold Goldberg; Makeda Byfield | SVA Theatre |
| 13th | January 23, 2024 | Baldur's Gate 3 | Reggie Fils-Aimé; Harold Goldberg; Sherri L. Smith | SVA Theatre |
| 14th | January 21, 2025 | Astro Bot | Reggie Fils-Aimé; Harold Goldberg; Sherri L. Smith | SVA Theatre |
| 15th | January 18, 2026 | Clair Obscur: Expedition 33 | Reggie Fils-Aimé; Harold Goldberg; Makeda Byfield | SVA Theatre |
| 16th | January 19, 2026 | TBD | Lara Lunardi; Arda Ocal | SVA Theatre |

== Award winners ==
=== 1st (2012) ===
The First Annual New York Games Awards took place on February 2, 2012, at New York University's Cantor Film Center. 21 games journalists voted on the award winners, and about 250 guests attended. Logan Cunningham, narrator of Bastion, served as the host. The livestream received roughly 300 views.

| Category | Winner |
|---|---|
| Big Apple Award for Best Game | The Elder Scrolls V: Skyrim |
| Herman Melville Award for Best Writing in a Game | Portal 2 |
| Battery Park Award for Best Handheld Game | Super Mario 3D Land |
| Manhattan Award for Most NY-Centric Game | Crysis 2 |
| Tin Pan Alley Award for Best Music in a Game | Bastion |
| A-Train Award for Best Mobile/iOS Game | Superbrothers: Sword & Sworcery EP |
| Off-Broadway Award for Best Indie Game | Bastion |
| Statue of Liberty Award for Best Open-World Game | Saints Row: The Third |
| Great White Way Award for Best Overall Acting in a Game | Portal 2 |
| Algonquin Roundtable Award for Best Book | All Your Base Are Belong to Us by Harold Goldberg |
| Mad Men Award for Best Videogame Commercial | Long Live Play – Michael |

=== 2nd (2013) ===
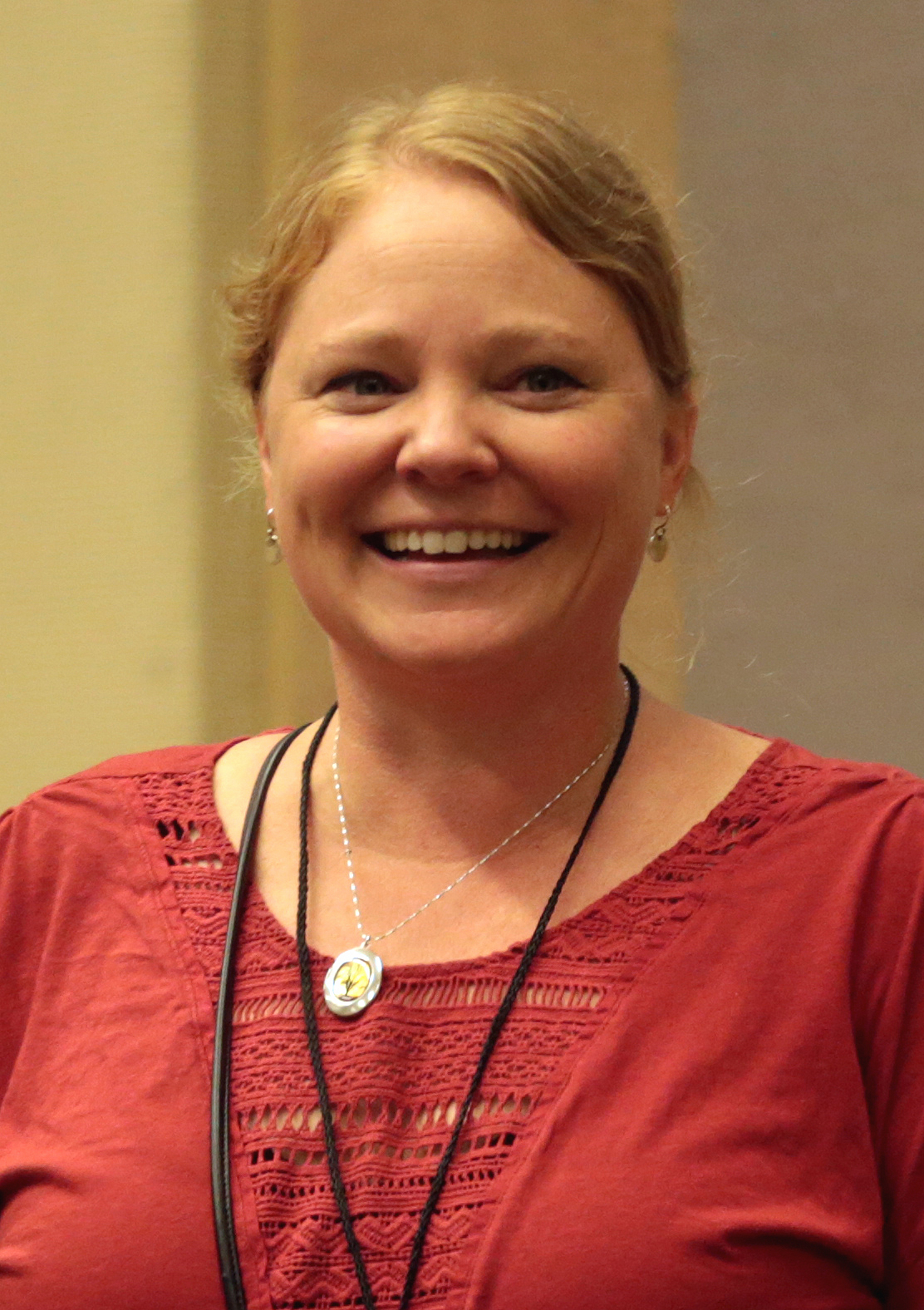
Melissa Hutchison won Best Acting for her role as Clementine in The Walking Dead.

The Second Annual New York Game Awards were held at NYU-Poly on February 5, 2013. Writer Daniel Radosh of The Daily Show hosted the event, and musical acts MC Frontalot and Schäffer the Darklord performed.

| Category | Winner |
|---|---|
| Big Apple Award for Best Videogame | The Walking Dead |
| Herman Melville Award for Best Videogame Writing | The Walking Dead |
| Battery Park Award for Best Handheld Console Game | Sound Shapes |
| Tin Pan Alley Award for Best Music | Journey |
| The A Train Award for Best Mobile/iOS Game | The Room |
| The Off Broadway Award for Best Independent Game | The Walking Dead |
| The Statue of Liberty Award for Best World | Dunwall from Dishonored |
| The Best Acting | Melissa Hutchison as Clementine (The Walking Dead) |
| Peter Cooper Locomotive Award for Best Game Machine | PS Vita |
| The Central Park Zoo Award for Best Kids Game | Unfinished Swan |

=== 3rd (2014) ===
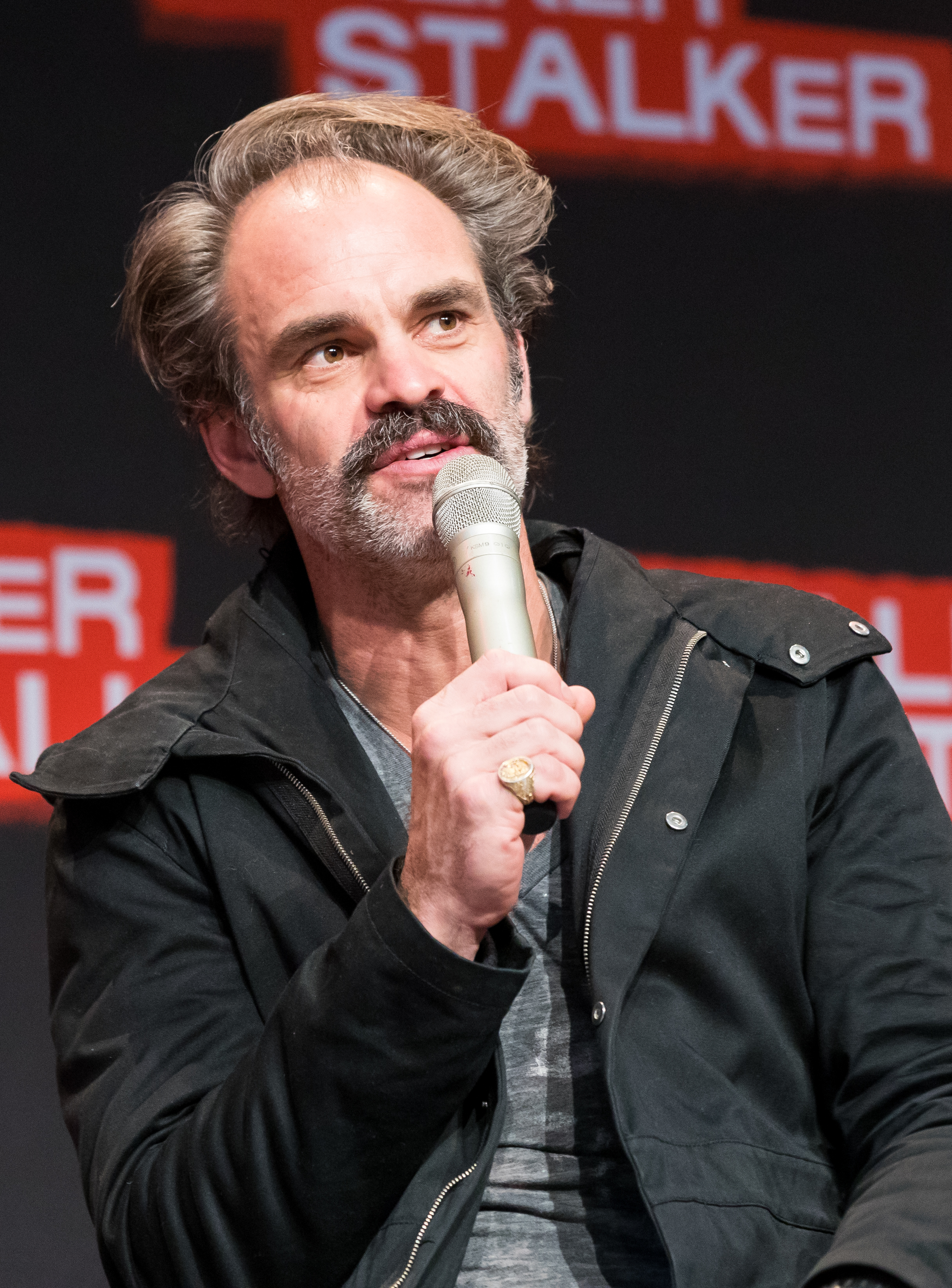
Steven Ogg won Best Acting for his role as Trevor Philips in Grand Theft Auto V.

The Third Annual New York Game Awards were hosted by Daniel Radosh for the second year in a row. Folk music group Future Folk performed, and Irrational Games premiered a video about the second episode of BioShock Infinite: Burial at Sea.

| Category | Winner |
|---|---|
| Big Apple Award for Best Game | The Last of Us |
| Battery Park Award for Best Handheld Game | The Legend of Zelda: A Link Between Worlds |
| Central Park Children's Zoo Award for Best Kids Game | Super Mario 3D World |
| Herman Melville Award for Best Writing | The Last of Us |
| A Train Award for Best Mobile Game | Ridiculous Fishing |
| Off Broadway Award for Best Indie Game | Gone Home |
| Tin Pan Alley Award for Best Music in a Game | BioShock Infinite |
| Statue of Liberty Award for Best World | Grand Theft Auto V |
| Great White Way Award for Best Acting in a Game | Steven Ogg as Trevor (Grand Theft Auto V) |

=== 4th (2015) ===
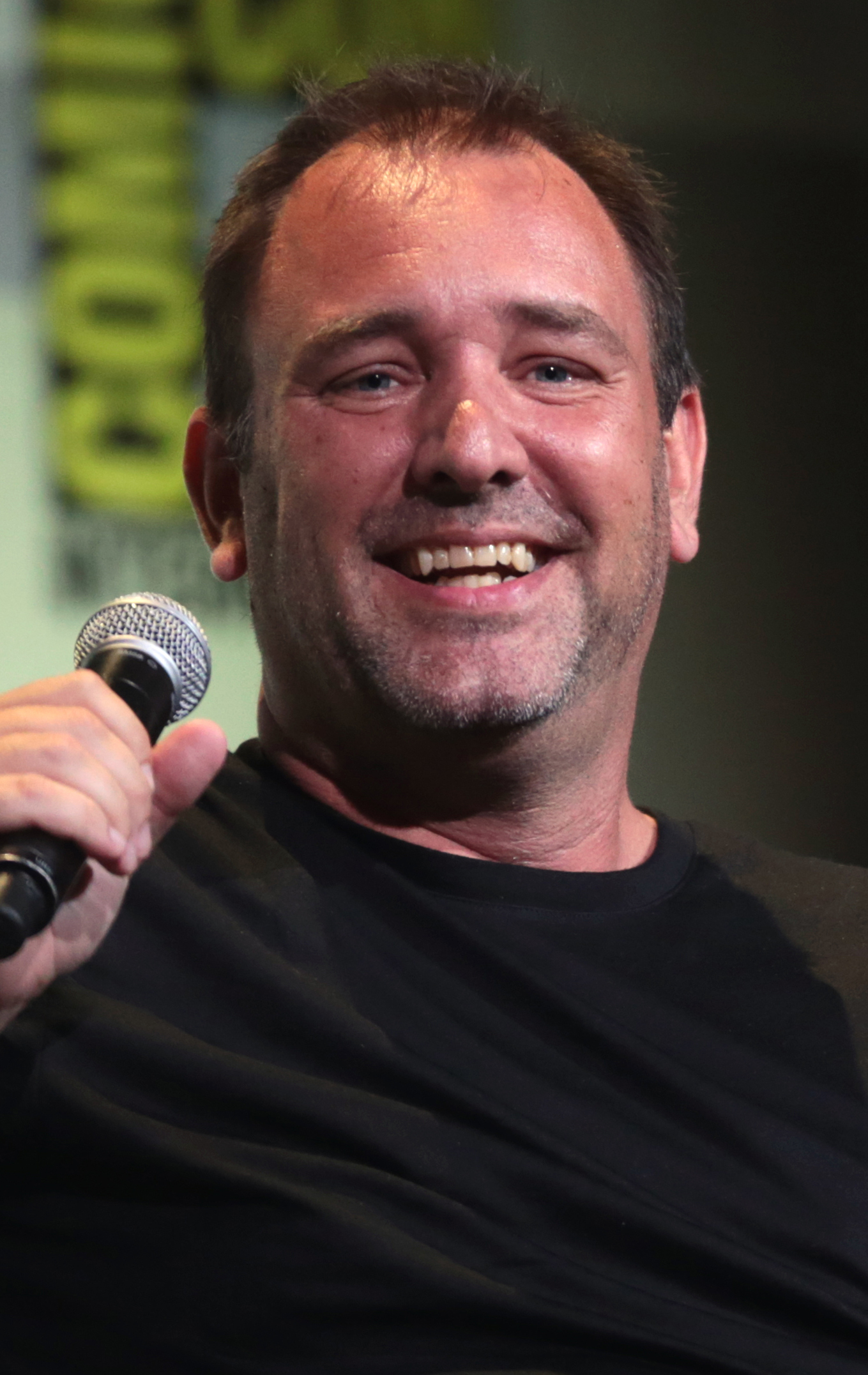
Trey Parker won Best Acting for his performances in South Park: The Stick of Truth.

In 2015, the New York Game Awards switched venues and took place at Villain, an event space in Williamsburg, Brooklyn. The awards show routine was written and hosted by The Daily Show's writing staff.

| Category | Winner |
|---|---|
| Big Apple Award for Best Game | Wolfenstein: The New Order |
| Herman Melville Award for Best Writing | South Park: The Stick of Truth |
| Central Park Children's Zoo Award for Best Kids Game | Mario Kart 8 |
| Battery Park Award for Best Handheld Game | Hearthstone: Heroes of Warcraft |
| A-Train Award for Best Mobile Game | Threes |
| Statue of Liberty Award for Best World | Far Cry 4 |
| Off Broadway Award for Best Indie Game | Shovel Knight |
| Freedom Tower Award for Best Remake | Grand Theft Auto V |
| Ebbets Field Award for Best E-Sports Experience | Super Smash Bros. Melee |
| Tin Pan Alley Award for Best Music in a Game | Transistor |
| Great White Way Award for Best Acting in a Game | Trey Parker (South Park: The Stick of Truth) |

=== 5th (2016) ===
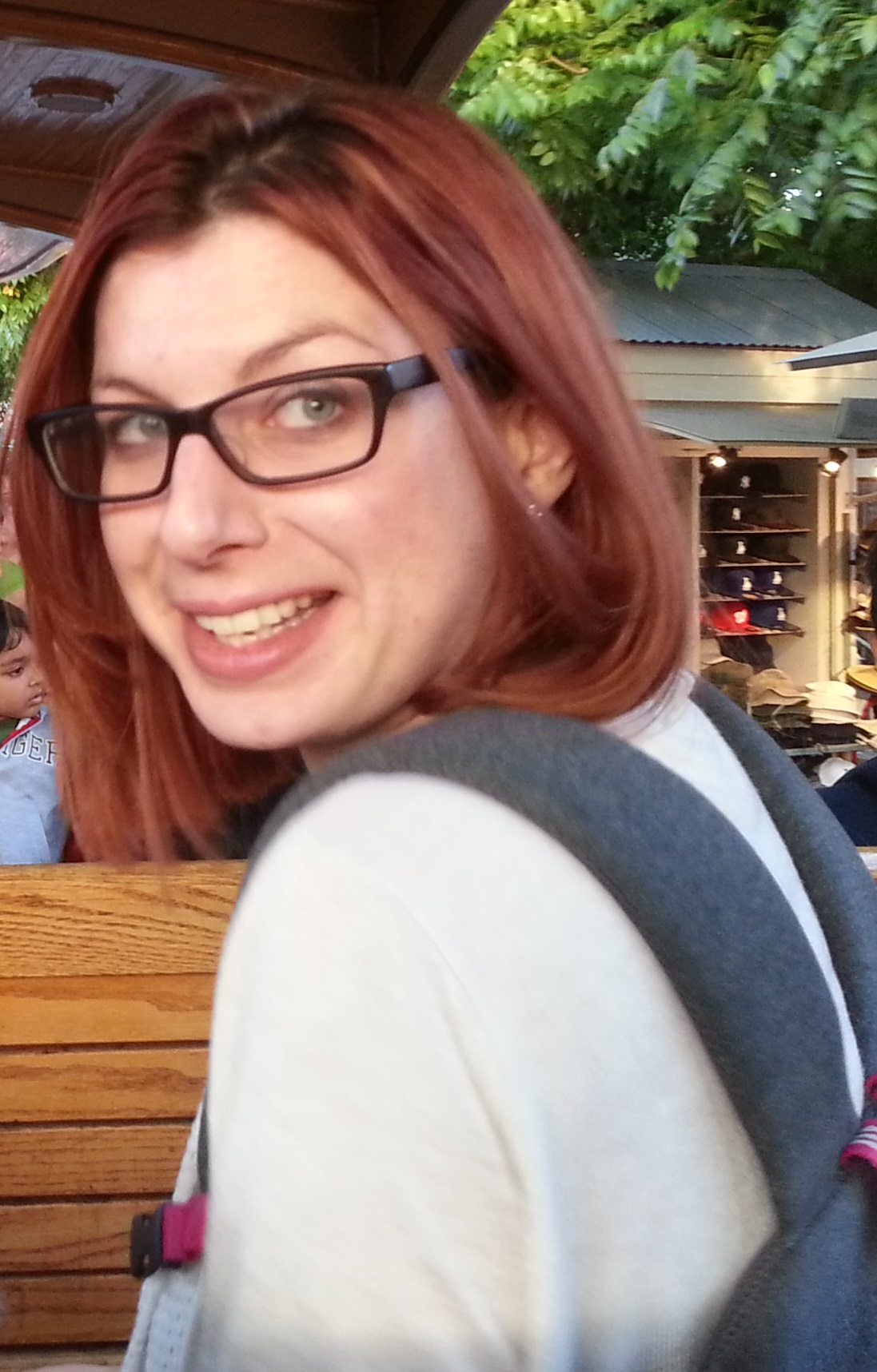
Cara Ellison won Best Games Journalism.

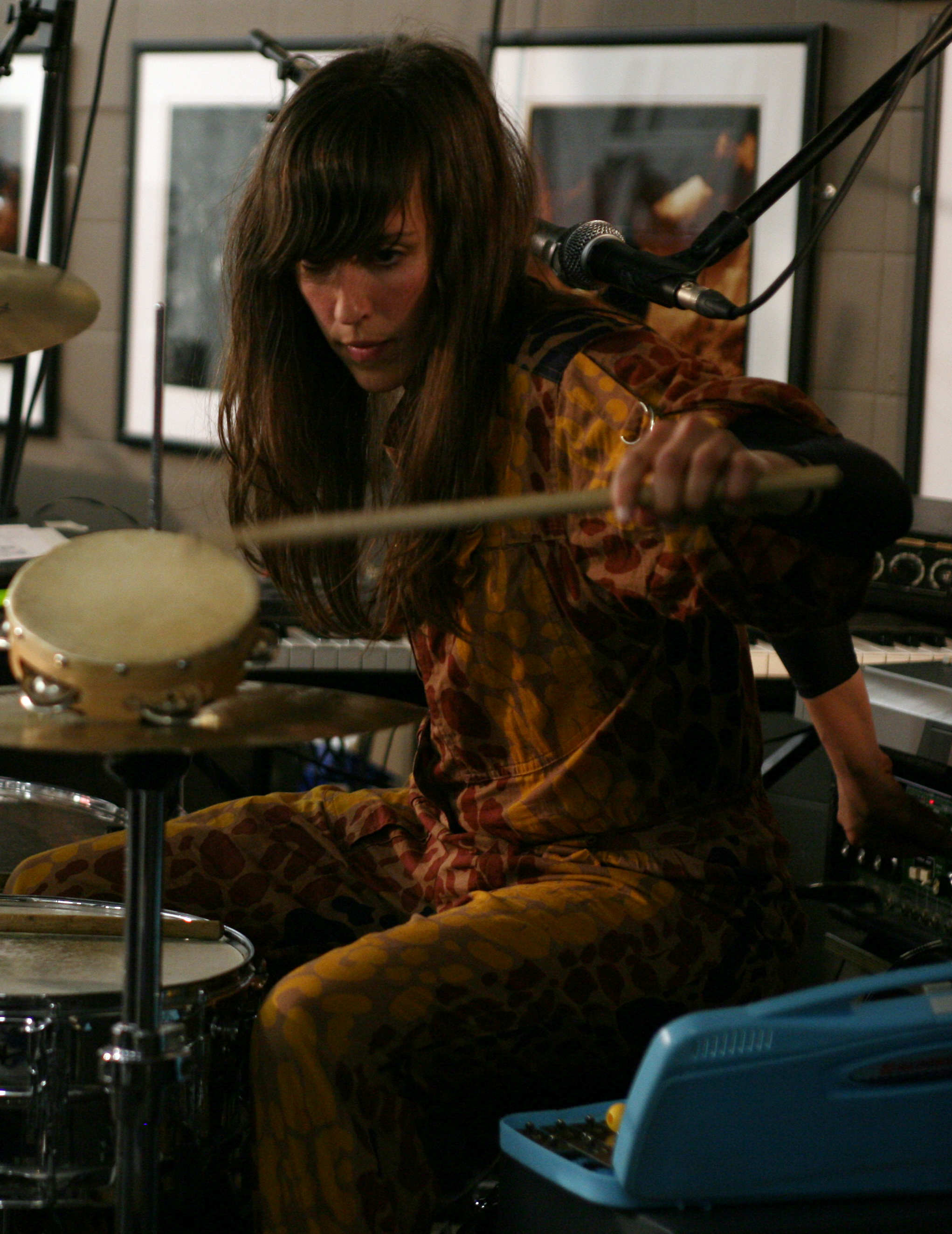
Viva Seifert won Best Acting for her role in Her Story.

In 2016, The Daily Show writer Owen Parsons took over writing and hosting the awards. Game studio The Molasses Flood premiered a trailer for The Flame in the Flood, and Wyclef Jean demoed music he contributed to rhythm game Lost in Harmony.

| Category | Winner |
|---|---|
| Big Apple Award for Best Game of the Year | The Witcher 3: Wild Hunt |
| Herman Melville Award for Best Writing | The Witcher 3: Wild Hunt |
| Andrew Yoon Memorial Legend Award | Rockstar Games |
| Knickerbocker Award for Best Games Journalism | Cara Ellison, Embed With Games |
| Central Park Children's Zoo Award for Best Kids Game | Super Mario Maker |
| Tin Pan Alley Award for Best Music in a Game | Metal Gear Solid V: The Phantom Pain |
| Freedom Tower Award for Best Remake | Rare Replay |
| Off Broadway Award for Best Indie Game | Rocket League |
| A-Train Award for Best Mobile Game | Lara Croft Go |
| Battery Park Award for Best Handheld Game | BoxBoy! |
| Statue of Liberty Award for Best World | The Witcher 3: Wild Hunt |
| Great White Way Award for Best Acting in a Game | Viva Seifert as Hannah Smith (Her Story) |
| Ebbetts Field Award for Best Esports Team | SK Telecom T1 (League of Legends) |

=== 6th (2017) ===
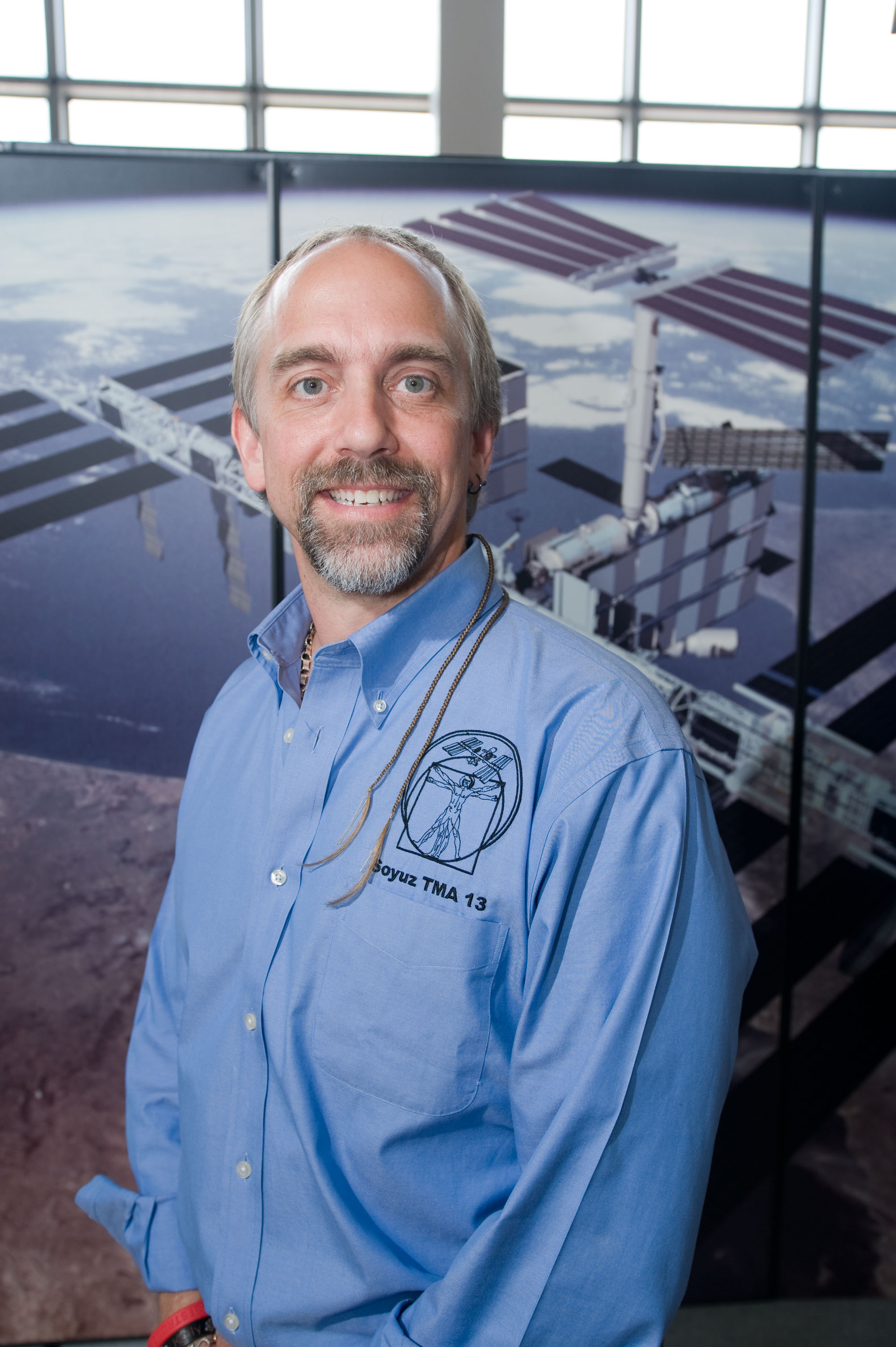
Richard Garriott won the Andrew Yoon Legend Award in 2017.

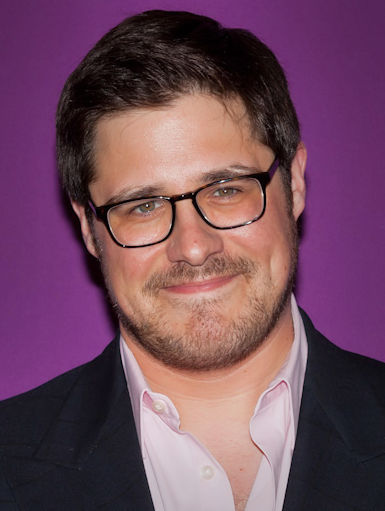
Rich Sommer won Best Acting for his role as Henry in Firewatch.

The Sixth Annual New York Game Awards were held at the Abron Arts Center and featured a musical performance by all-women accordion band the Main Squeeze.

| Category | Winner |
|---|---|
| Big Apple Award for Game of the Year | Uncharted 4: A Thief's End |
| Herman Melville Award for Best Writing in a Game | Mafia III |
| Andrew Yoon Legend Award | Richard Garriott |
| Knickerbocker Award for Best Games Journalism | David Wolinsky, Don't Die |
| Coney Island Dreamland Award for Best VR Game | Superhot |
| A-Train Award for Best Mobile Game | Pokémon Go |
| Great White Way Award for Best Acting in a Game | Rich Sommer as Henry (Firewatch) |
| Off Broadway Award for Best Indie Game | Inside |
| Tin Pan Alley Award for Best Music in a Game | Thumper |
| Central Park Zoo Award for Best Kids Game | Pokémon Go |
| Statue of Liberty Award for Best World | Hitman |
| Freedom Tower Award for Best Remake | The Legend of Zelda: Twilight Princess HD |
| Battery Park Award for Best Handheld Game | Severed |
| Ebbetts Field Award for Best Esports Team | Cloud9 |

=== 7th (2018) ===
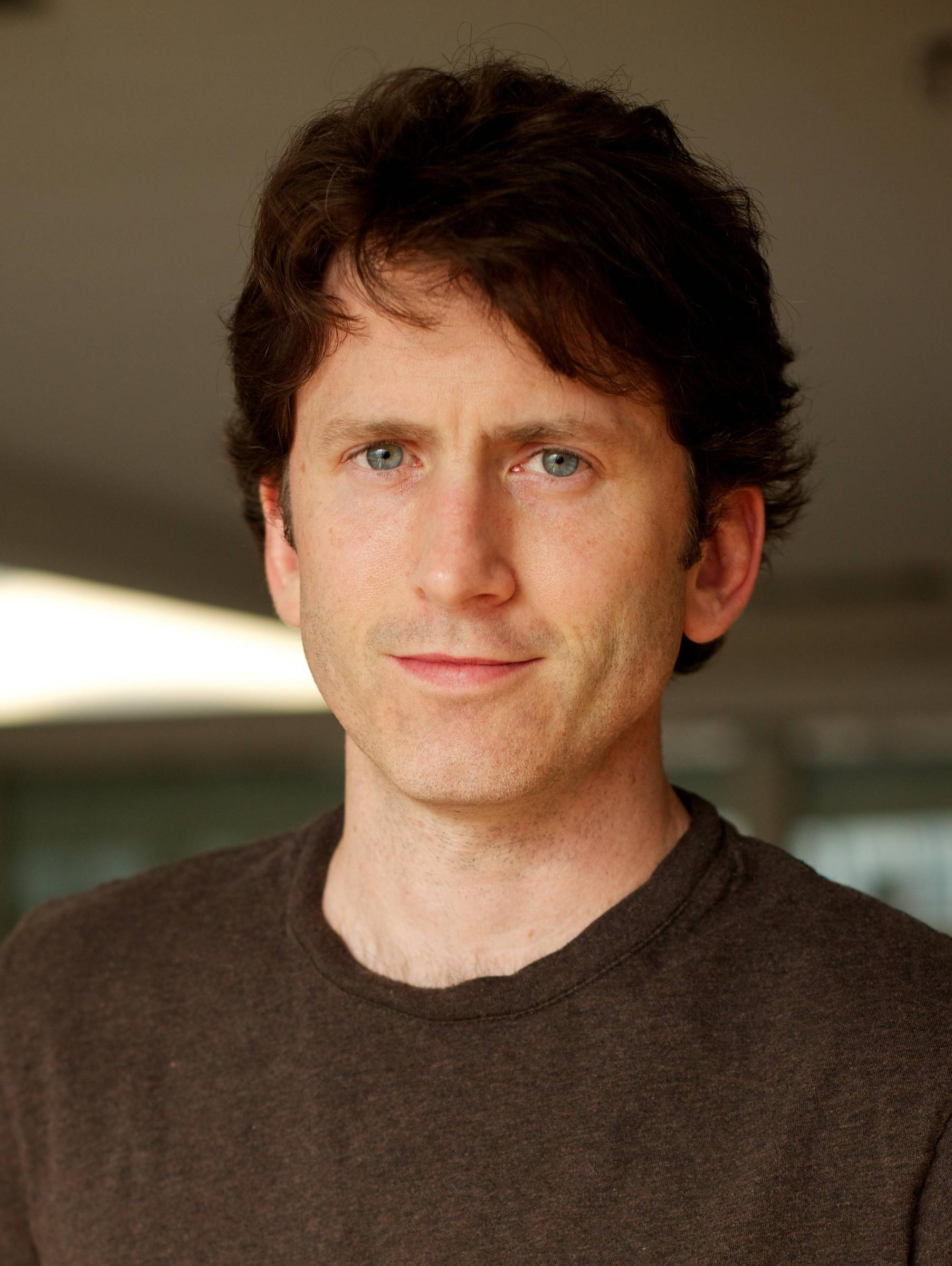
Todd Howard won the Andrew Yoon Legend Award in 2018.

The 7th Annual New York Game Awards were hosted by Devin Delliquanti of The Daily Show. Musician Shilpa Ray performed.

| Category | Winner |
|---|---|
| Big Apple Award for Game of the Year | The Legend of Zelda: Breath of the Wild |
| Herman Melville Award for Best Writing in a Game | Wolfenstein II: The New Colossus |
| Andrew Yoon Legend Award | Todd Howard |
| Knickerbocker Award for Best Games Journalism | Yussef Cole, Unwinnable |
| Coney Island Dreamland Award for Best VR Game | Resident Evil 7: Biohazard |
| A-Train Award for Best Mobile Game | HQ Trivia |
| Great White Way Award for Best Acting in a Game | Melina Juergens as Senua (Hellblade: Senua's Sacrifice) |
| Off Broadway Award for Best Indie Game | Cuphead |
| Tin Pan Alley Award for Best Music in a Game | Persona 5 |
| Central Park Zoo Award for Best Kids Game | Super Mario Odyssey |
| Statue of Liberty Award for Best World | The Legend of Zelda: Breath of the Wild |
| Freedom Tower Award for Best Remake | Metroid: Samus Returns |
| Ebbetts Field Award for Best Esports Moment | Plup Annihilates Armada |

=== 8th (2019) ===
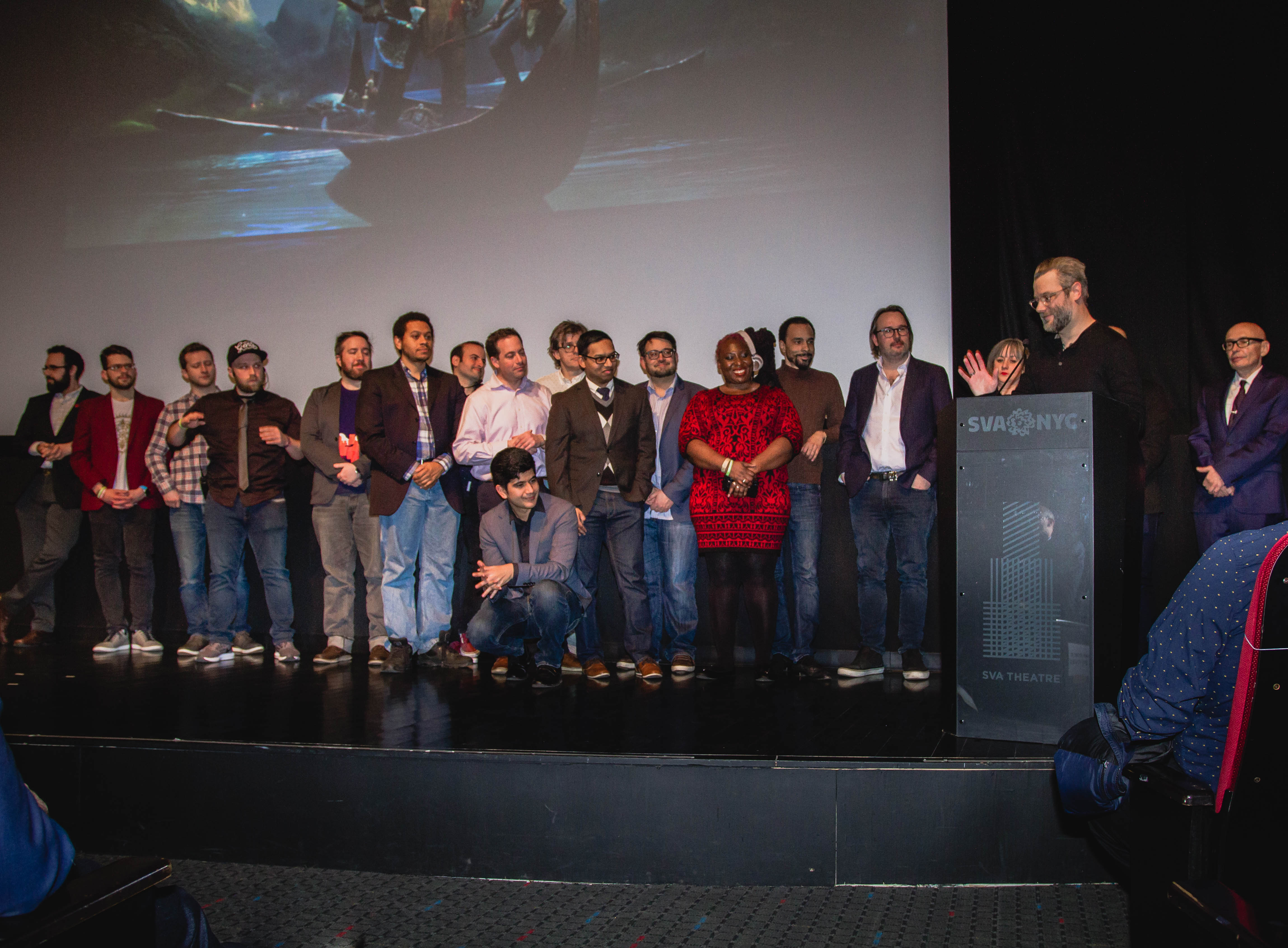
Cory Barlog accepting the Big Apple Award for Game of the Year for God of War

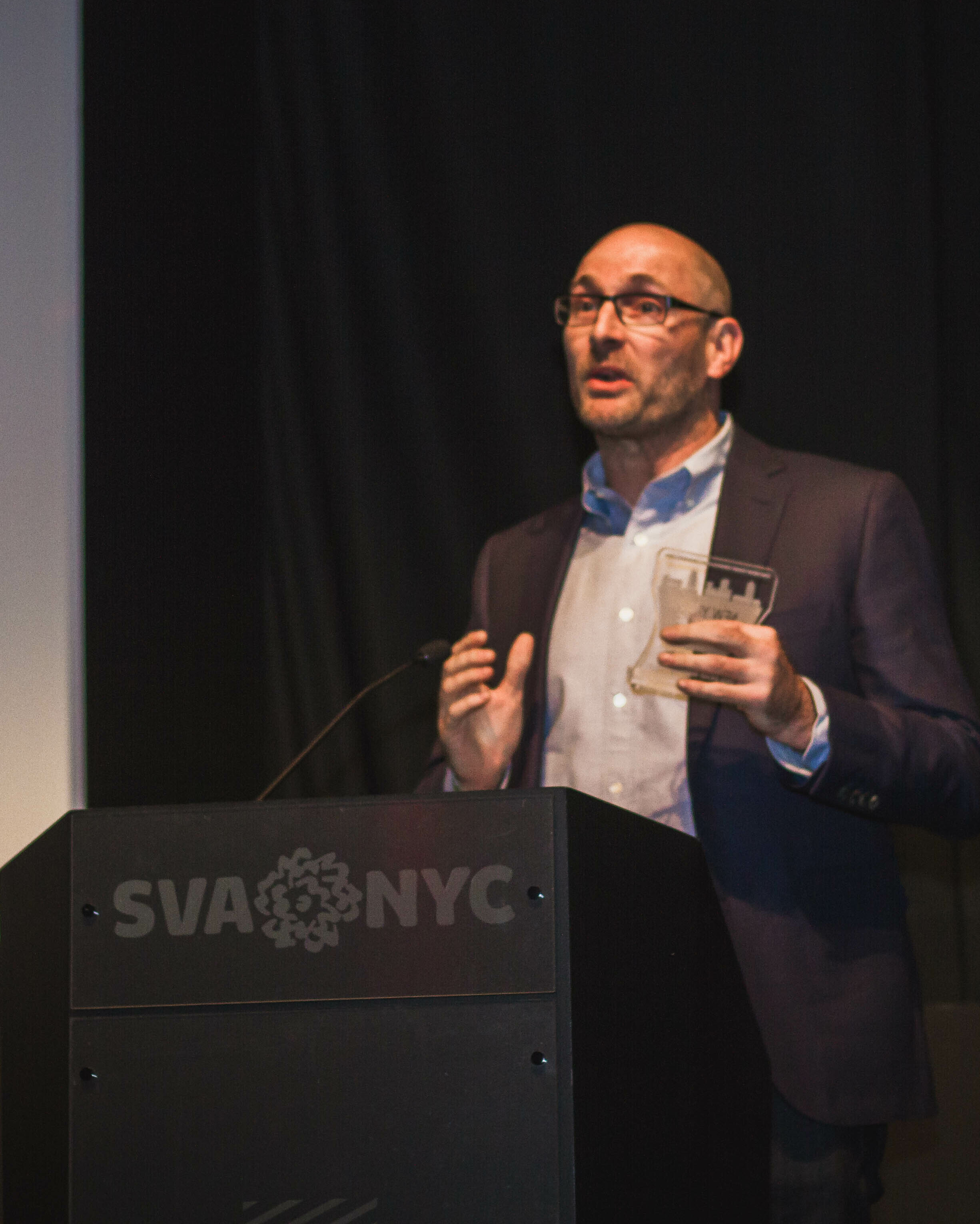
Simon Ramsey

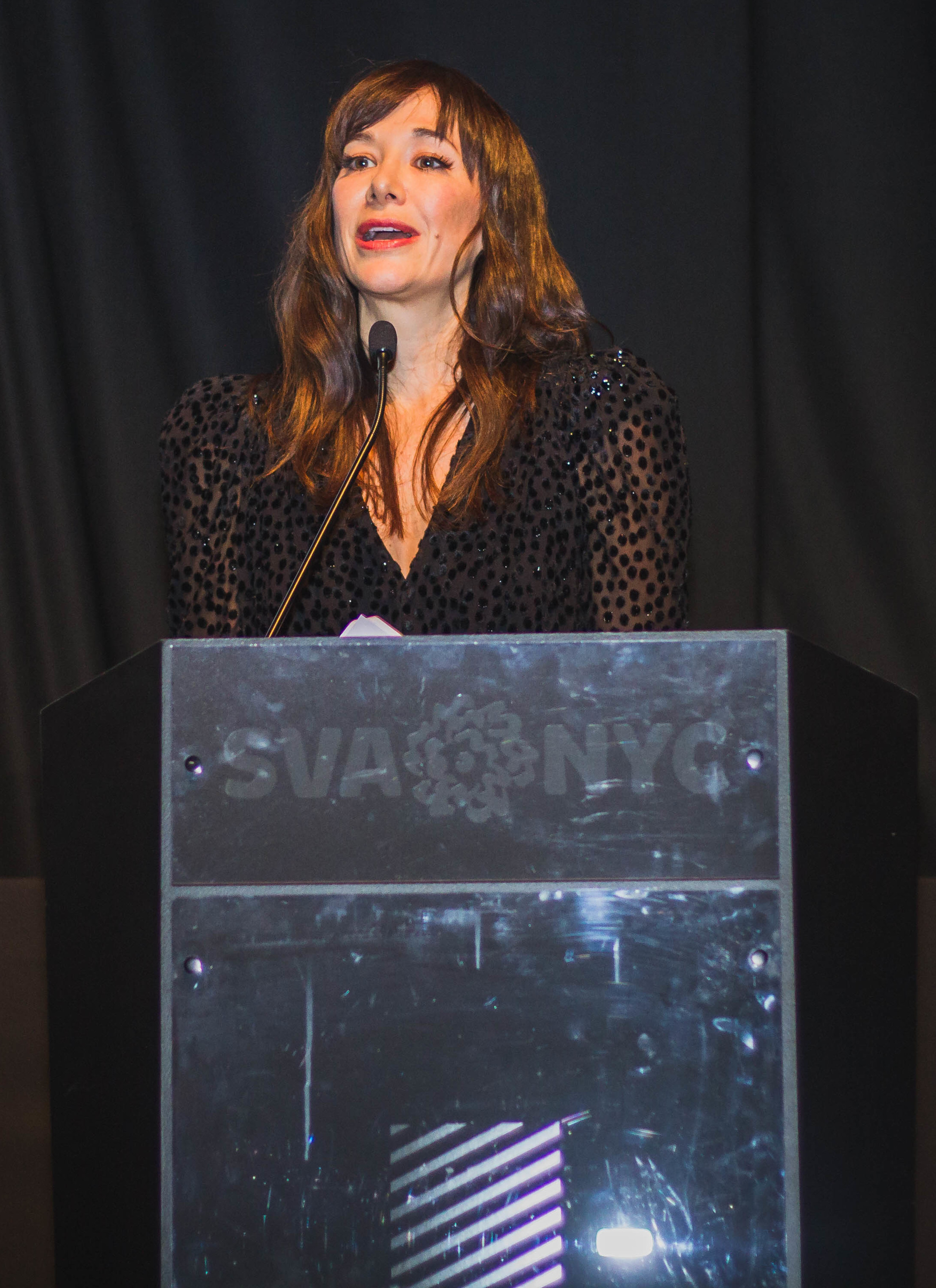
Jade Raymond

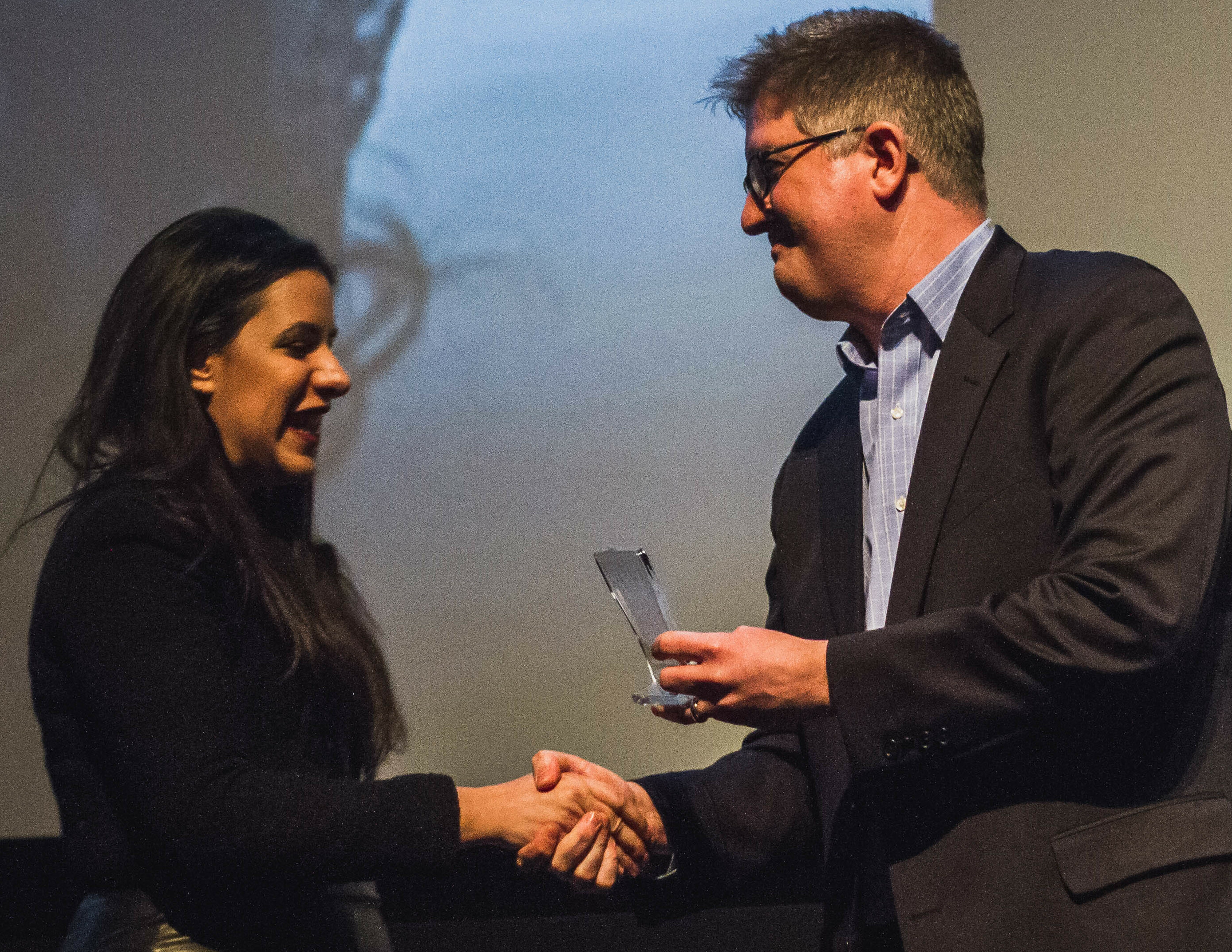
Cecilia D'Anastasio

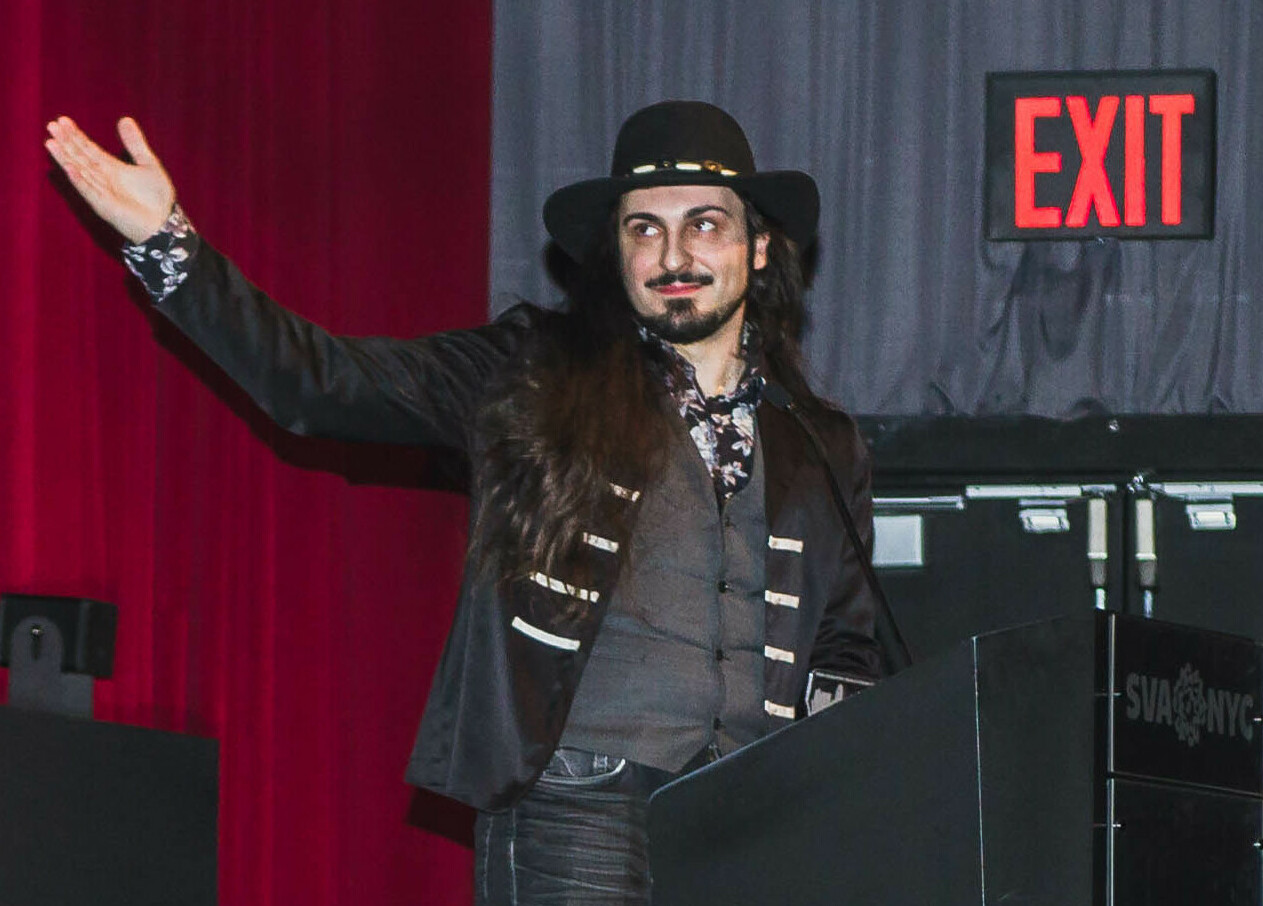
Yoann Laulan

Raymond and D'Anastasio won awards for their work and careers, while Ramsey and Laulan accepted on behalf of Red Dead Redemption 2 and Dead Cells, respectively.

In 2019, the New York Game Awards moved to the SVA Theatre in Manhattan. The event, hosted again by Devin Delliquanti with appearances by The Daily Show's Daniel Radosh, Josh Johnson and Kat Radley, featured a performance by guitarist and vocalist Maddie Rice, as well as trailer premieres for Inkle title Heaven's Vault and Shawn Alexander Allen's Treachery in Beatdown City. The livestream received approximately 400,000 views, a significant increase from earlier ceremonies.

| Category | Winner |
|---|---|
| Big Apple Award for Game of the Year | God of War |
| Herman Melville Award for Best Writing in a Game | Red Dead Redemption 2 |
| Andrew Yoon Legend Award | Jade Raymond |
| Knickerbocker Award for Best Games Journalism | Cecilia D'Anastasio, Kotaku |
| Coney Island Dreamland Award for Best VR Game | Tetris Effect |
| A-Train Award for Best Mobile Game | Florence |
| Raging Bull Award for Best Fighting Game | Super Smash Bros. Ultimate |
| Great White Way Award for Best Acting in a Game | Christopher Judge as Kratos (God of War) |
| Off Broadway Award for Best Indie Game | Dead Cells |
| Tin Pan Alley Award for Best Music in a Game | Tetris Effect |
| Central Park Zoo Award for Best Kids Game | Nintendo Labo Variety Pack |
| Statue of Liberty Award for Best World | Red Dead Redemption 2 |
| Freedom Tower Award for Best Remake | Shadow of the Colossus |
| Captain Award for Best Rookie Esports Team | Knicks Gaming |

=== 9th (2020) ===
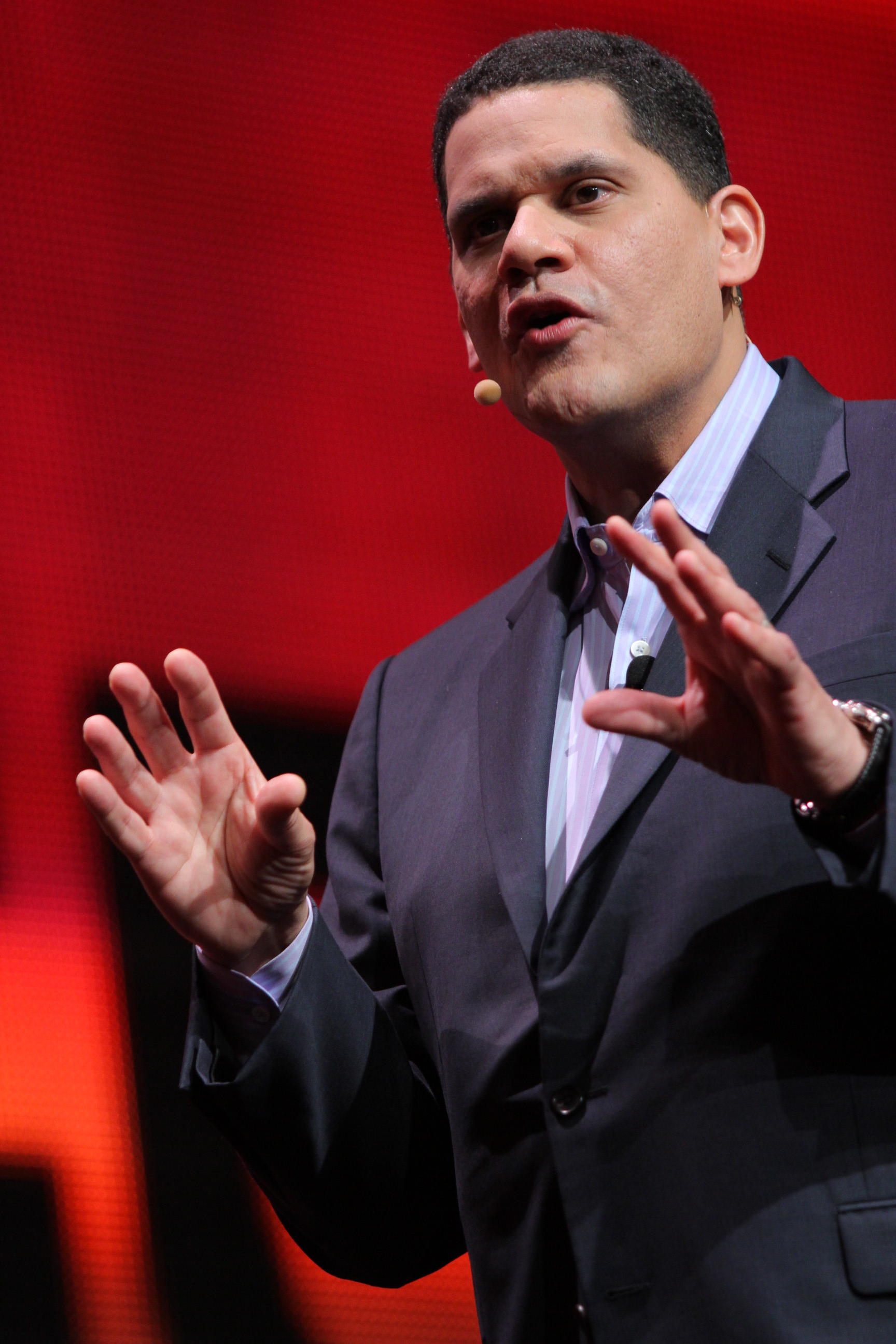
Reggie Fils-Aimé won the Andrew Yoon Legend Award in 2020.

The 9th Annual New York Game Awards were held on January 21, 2020. The recipient of the Andrew Yoon Legend award was the former Nintendo of America president Reggie Fils-Aimé.

| Category | Winner |
|---|---|
| Big Apple Award for Game of the Year | The Outer Worlds |
| Herman Melville Award for Best Writing in a Game | Disco Elysium |
| Coney Island Dreamland Award for Best VR/AR Game | Minecraft Earth |
| A-Train Award for Best Mobile Game | Sayonara Wild Hearts |
| Great White Way Award for Best Acting in a Game | Courtney Hope as Jesse (Control) |
| Off Broadway Award for Best Indie Game | Disco Elysium |
| Tin Pan Alley Award for Best Music in a Game | Sayonara Wild Hearts |
| Central Park Zoo Award for Best Kids Game | Luigi's Mansion 3 |
| Statue of Liberty Award for Best World | Outer Wilds |
| Captain Award for Best Rookie Esports Team | FunPlus Phoenix (League of Legends) |
| Joltin' Joe Award for Best Esports Player of the Year | Arslan Ash |
| Knickerbocker Award for Best Games Journalism | Khee Hoon Chan, Rock Paper Shotgun |
| Andrew Yoon Legend Award | Reggie Fils-Aimé |

=== 10th (2021) ===
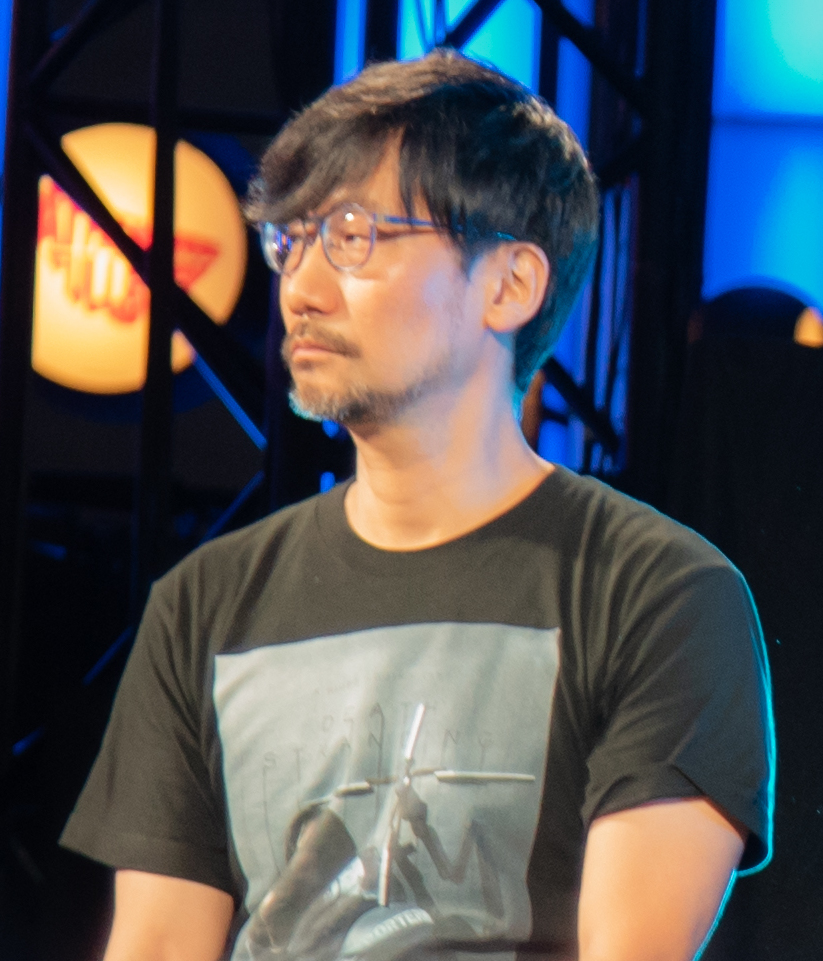
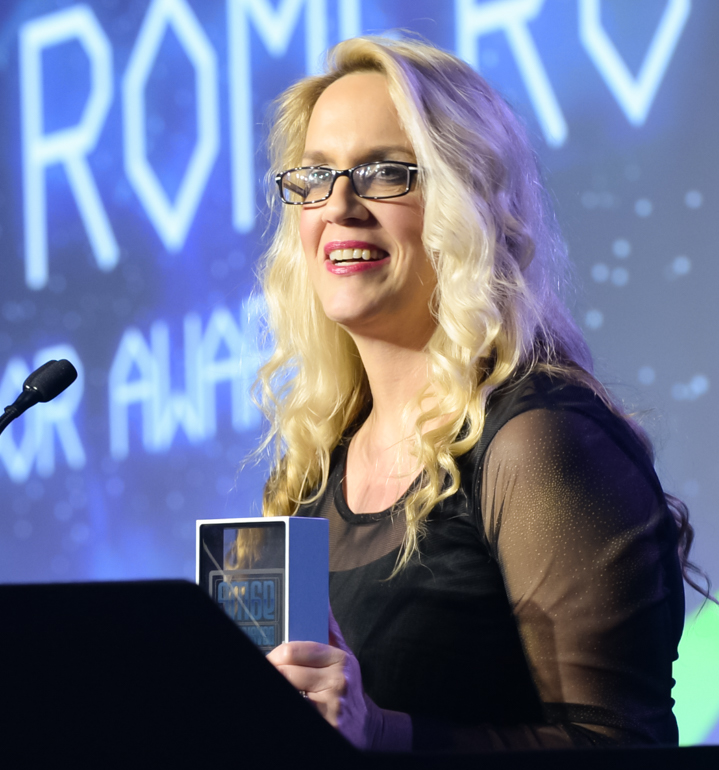
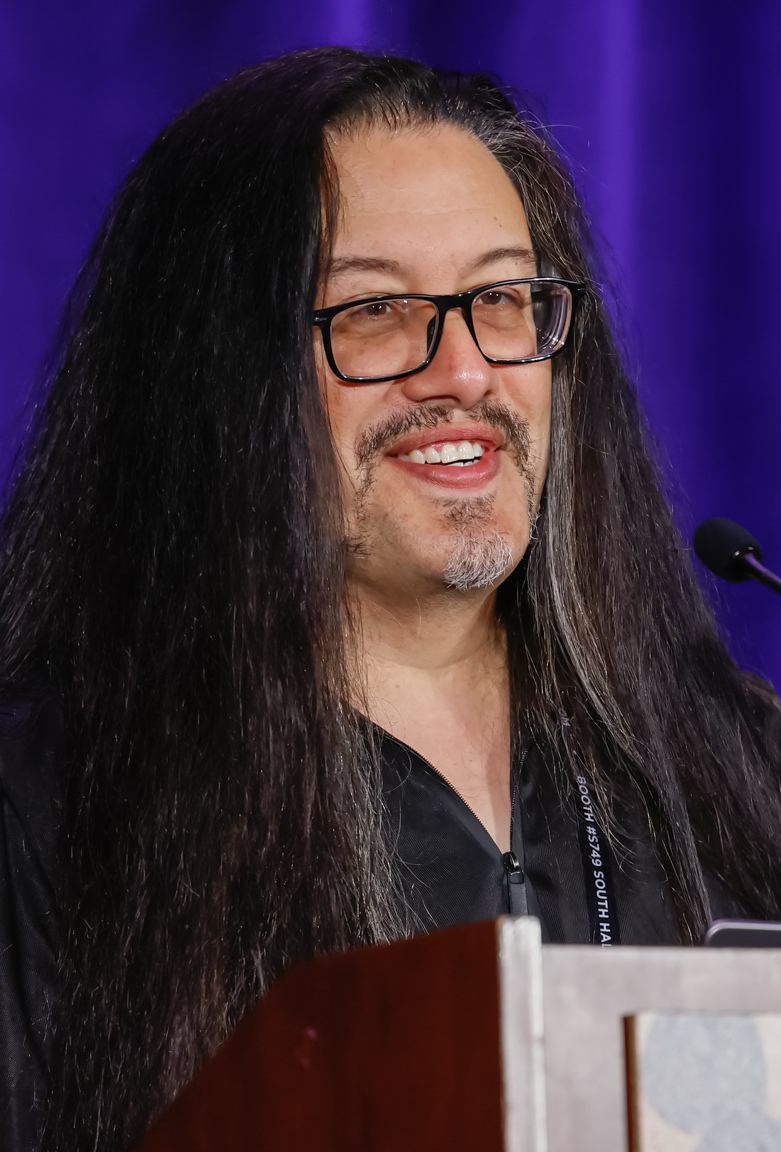
Hideo Kojima (top), Brenda Romero (center) and John Romero (bottom) received the Andrew Yoon Legend Award in 2021, alongside Jerry Lawson (not pictured).

The 10th Annual New York Game Awards were held on January 26, 2021. Due to the COVID-19 pandemic, the event was held virtually, co-hosted by Reggie Fils-Aimé. The nominees were announced on January 5, 2021. Immediately before the show, Fils-Aimé partook in a roundtable discussion with Jack Tretton and Robbie Bach, formerly of Sony and Microsoft, respectively. Hades won the Big Apple Award for Game of the Year. The Andrew Yoon Legend Award was given to Hideo Kojima, Jerry Lawson, and Brenda and John Romero.

| Category | Winner |
|---|---|
| Big Apple Award for Game of the Year | Hades |
| Herman Melville Award for Best Writing in a Game | Hades |
| Coney Island Dreamland Award for Best VR/AR Game | Half-Life: Alyx |
| A-Train Award for Best Mobile Game | Genshin Impact |
| Great White Way Award for Best Acting in a Game | Logan Cunningham as Lord Hades / Poseidon / Achilles / Charon / The Storyteller / Asterius (Hades) |
| Off Broadway Award for Best Indie Game | Hades |
| Tin Pan Alley Award for Best Music in a Game | Hades |
| Central Park Zoo Award for Best Kids Game | Animal Crossing: New Horizons |
| Statue of Liberty Award for Best World | Ghost of Tsushima |
| Freedom Tower Award for Best Remake | Final Fantasy VII Remake |
| Shea Stadium Award for Best Esports Event | Overwatch League |
| Captain Award for Best Rookie Esports Team | Red Bull OG (Counter-Strike: Global Offensive) |
| Knickerbocker Award for Best Games Journalism | Jason Schreier, Kotaku |
| Andrew Yoon Legend Award | Hideo Kojima |
| Andrew Yoon Legend Award | Jerry Lawson |
| Andrew Yoon Legend Award | Brenda Romero |
| Andrew Yoon Legend Award | John Romero |

=== 11th (2022) ===
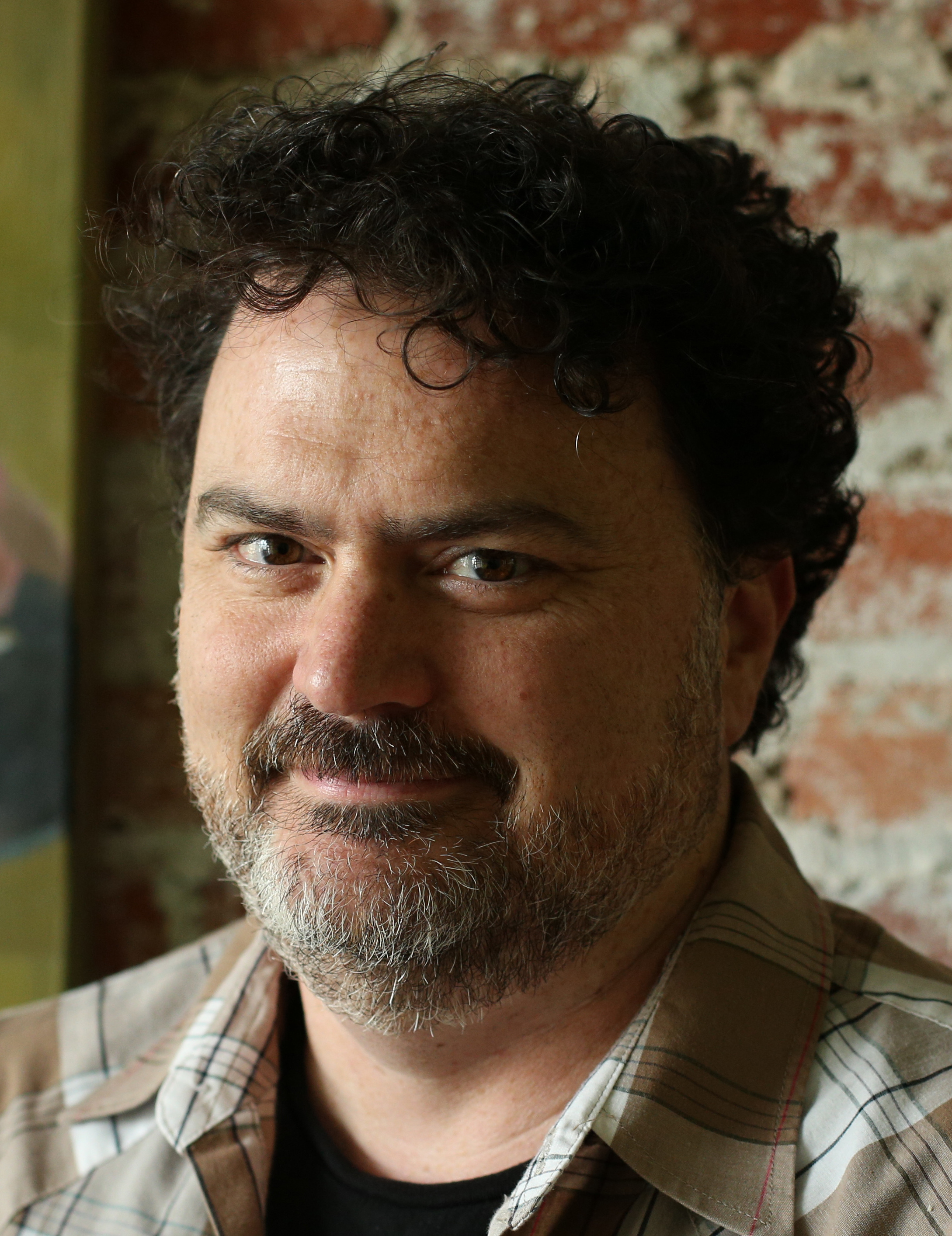
Tim Schafer won the Andrew Yoon Legend Award in 2022.

The 11th Annual New York Game Awards were held on February 1, 2022. The event was originally set to be held at the SVA Theatre, but was held virtually for the second time due to the COVID-19 pandemic. The nominees were announced on January 11, 2022.

| Category | Winner |
|---|---|
| Big Apple Award for Game of the Year | Psychonauts 2 |
| Off Broadway Award for Best Indie Game | Sable |
| Herman Melville Award for Best Writing in a Game | Life Is Strange: True Colors |
| Statue of Liberty Award for Best World | Psychonauts 2 |
| Tin Pan Alley Award for Best Music in a Game | Sable |
| Great White Way Award for Best Acting in a Game | Maggie Robertson as Lady Dimitrescu (Resident Evil Village) |
| Coney Island Dreamland Award for Best VR/AR Game | Resident Evil 4 VR |
| Central Park Zoo Award for Best Kids Game | Ratchet & Clank: Rift Apart |
| A-Train Award for Best Mobile Game | Nier Reincarnation |
| Freedom Tower Award for Best Remake | Resident Evil 4 VR |
| Captain Award for Best Esports Team | Natus Vincere (Counter-Strike: Global Offensive) |
| Joltin' Joe Award for Best Esports Player of the Year | Genki "Gen" Kumisaka (Donuts USG, Tekken 7) |
| Knickerbocker Award for Best Games Journalism | Rebekah Valentine, IGN |
| Andrew Yoon Legend Award | Tim Schafer |

=== 12th (2023) ===
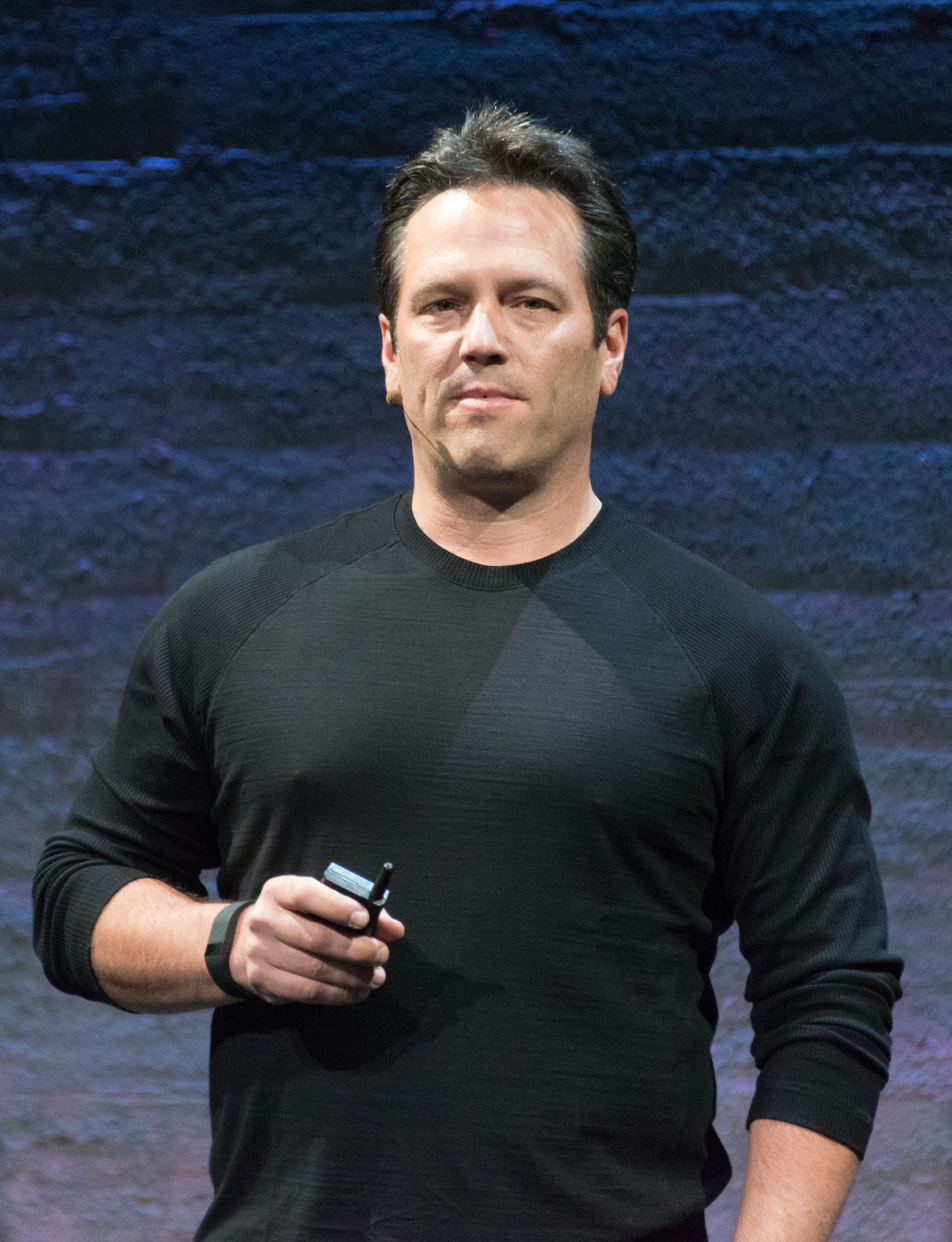
Phil Spencer won the Andrew Yoon Legend Award in 2023.

The 12th Annual New York Game Awards took place on January 17, 2023, returning to the SVA Theatre for the first in-person show since 2020. Fils-Aimé and Goldberg returned to host, alongside Makeda Byfield. Planning for the show had begun by August 2022, and the nominees were announced on January 4, 2023. Phil Spencer received the Andrew Yoon Legend Award.

| Category | Winner |
|---|---|
| Big Apple Award for Game of the Year | Elden Ring |
| Off Broadway Award for Best Indie Game | Vampire Survivors |
| Herman Melville Award for Best Writing in a Game | God of War: Ragnarök |
| Statue of Liberty Award for Best World | Elden Ring |
| Tin Pan Alley Award for Best Music in a Game | Metal: Hellsinger |
| Great White Way Award for Best Acting in a Game | Manon Gage as Marissa Marcel (Immortality) |
| Coney Island Dreamland Award for Best AR/VR Game | Moss: Book II |
| Central Park Zoo Award for Best Kids Game | Kirby and the Forgotten Land |
| A-Train Award for Best Mobile Game | Marvel Snap |
| Freedom Tower Award for Best Remake | The Stanley Parable: Ultra Deluxe |
| Joltin' Joe Award for Best Esports Player of the Year | Masaya "aMSa" Chikamoto (VGBootCamp, Super Smash Bros. Melee) |
| Chumley's Speakeasy Award for Best Hidden Gem | Signalis |
| NYC GWB Award for Best DLC | Destiny 2: The Witch Queen |
| Knickerbocker Award for Best Games Journalism | Justin Heckert, Vanity Fair |
| Elizabeth Jennings Graham Award for Best Education | Ryan O'Callaghan |
| Andrew Yoon Legend Award | Phil Spencer |

=== 13th (2024) ===
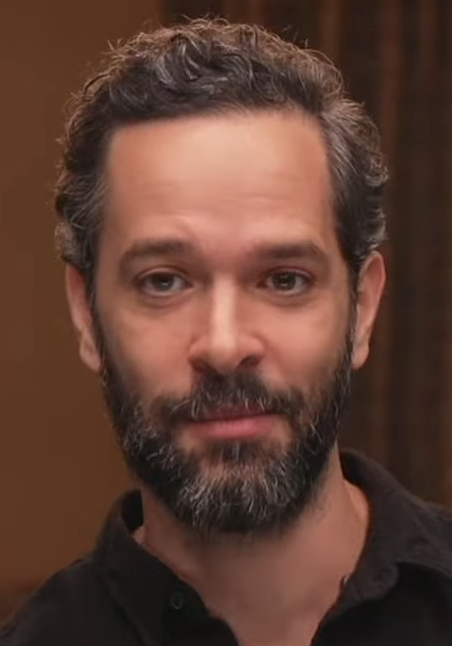
Neil Druckmann won the Andrew Yoon Legend Award in 2024.

The 13th New York Game Awards took place at the SVA Theatre on January 23, 2024. The nominees were announced by Manon Gage and Makeda Byfield on January 9; Baldur's Gate 3 led with six nominations, followed by Alan Wake 2 and Cyberpunk 2077: Phantom Liberty with five. At the ceremony, Baldur's Gate 3 won two awards, including the Big Apple Award for Game of the Year. Neil Druckmann of Naughty Dog received the Andrew Yoon Legend Award.

| Category | Winner |
|---|---|
| Big Apple Award for Game of the Year | Baldur's Gate 3 |
| Off Broadway Award for Best Indie Game | Chants of Sennaar |
| Herman Melville Award for Best Writing in a Game | Baldur's Gate 3 |
| Statue of Liberty Award for Best World | Alan Wake 2 |
| Tin Pan Alley Award for Best Music in a Game | Hi-Fi Rush |
| Great White Way Award for Best Acting in a Game | Melanie Liburd as Saga Anderson (Alan Wake 2) |
| Coney Island Dreamland Award for Best AR/VR Game | Asgard's Wrath 2 |
| Central Park Children's Zoo Award for Best Kids Game | Super Mario Bros. Wonder |
| A-Train Award for Best Mobile Game | Honkai: Star Rail |
| Freedom Tower Award for Best Remake | Resident Evil 4 |
| Joltin' Joe Award for Best Esports Player of the Year | Arslan Ash |
| Chumley's Speakeasy Award for Best Hidden Gem | Slay the Princess |
| NYC GWB Award for Best DLC | Cyberpunk 2077: Phantom Liberty |
| Knickerbocker Award for Best Games Journalism | Nicole Carpenter, Polygon |
| Andrew Yoon Legend Award | Neil Druckmann |

=== 14th (2025) ===
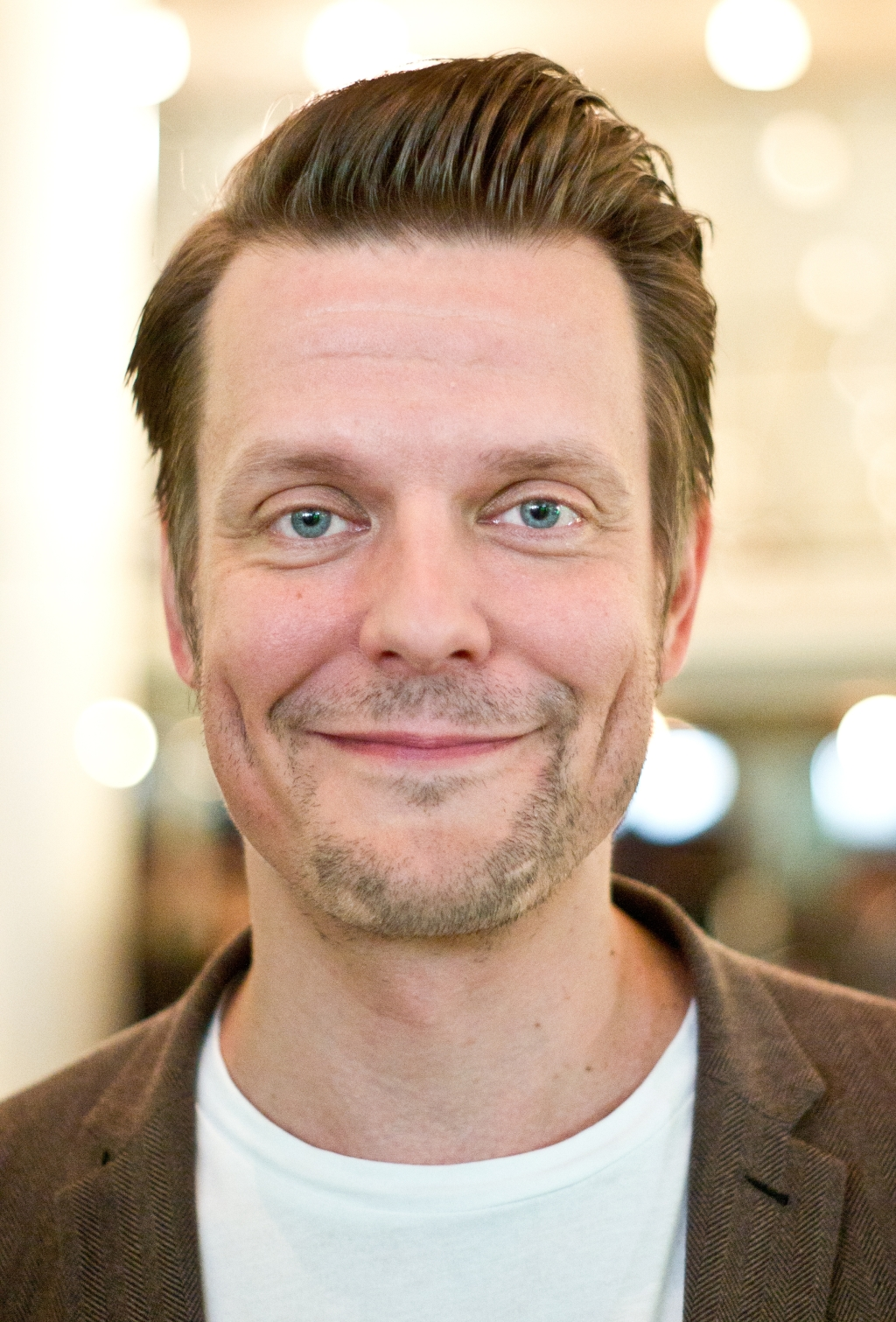
Sam Lake received the Andrew Yoon Legend Award in 2025.

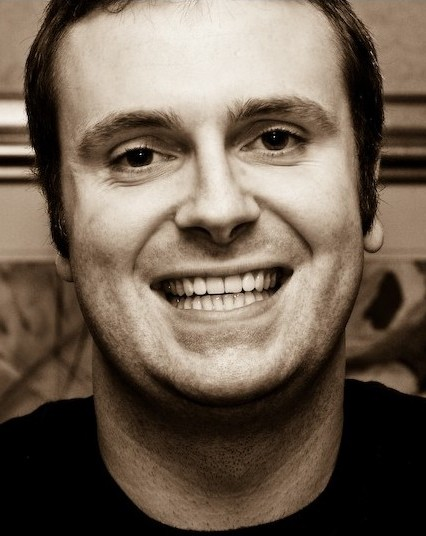
Kenneth C. M. Young won Best Music for his work on Astro Bot.

The 14th New York Game Awards took place at the SVA Theatre on January 21, 2025, presented by Fils-Aimé, Goldberg, and Sherri L. Smith; it was streamed on the Paley Center for Media's YouTube channel, among others. The nominees were announced on January 7; 1000xResist, Astro Bot, and Indiana Jones and the Great Circle led with four nominations each. At the ceremony, Astro Bot won three awards, including the Big Apple Award for Game of the Year. Sam Lake of Remedy Entertainment received the Andrew Yoon Legend Award, and Mega Ran performed at the show.

| Category | Winner |
|---|---|
| Big Apple Award for Game of the Year | Astro Bot |
| Off Broadway Award for Best Indie Game | UFO 50 |
| Herman Melville Award for Best Writing in a Game | Metaphor: ReFantazio |
| Statue of Liberty Award for Best World | Elden Ring: Shadow of the Erdtree |
| Tin Pan Alley Award for Best Music in a Game | Astro Bot |
| Great White Way Award for Best Acting in a Game | Troy Baker as Indiana Jones (Indiana Jones and the Great Circle) |
| Coney Island Dreamland Award for Best AR/VR Game | Batman: Arkham Shadow |
| Central Park Children's Zoo Award for Best Kids Game | Astro Bot |
| A-Train Award for Best Mobile Game | Zenless Zone Zero |
| Freedom Tower Award for Best Remake | Silent Hill 2 |
| Chumley's Speakeasy Award for Best Hidden Gem | Mouthwashing |
| NYC GWB Award for Best DLC | Elden Ring: Shadow of the Erdtree |
| Knickerbocker Award for Best Games Journalism | Simone de Rochefort and Clayton Ashley, Polygon |
| Andrew Yoon Legend Award | Sam Lake |

=== 15th (2026) ===
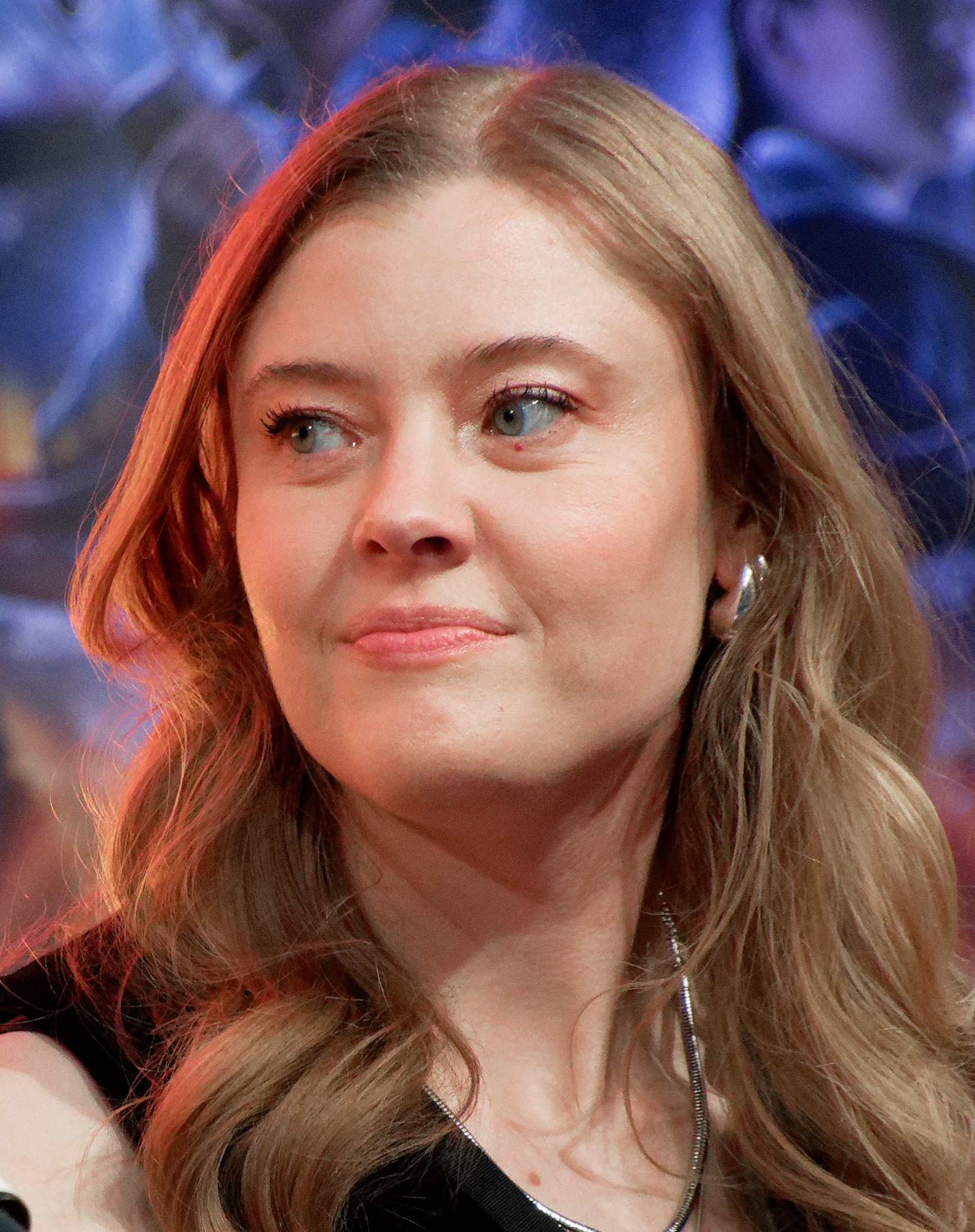
Jennifer English won Best Acting for her role as Maelle in Clair Obscur: Expedition 33.

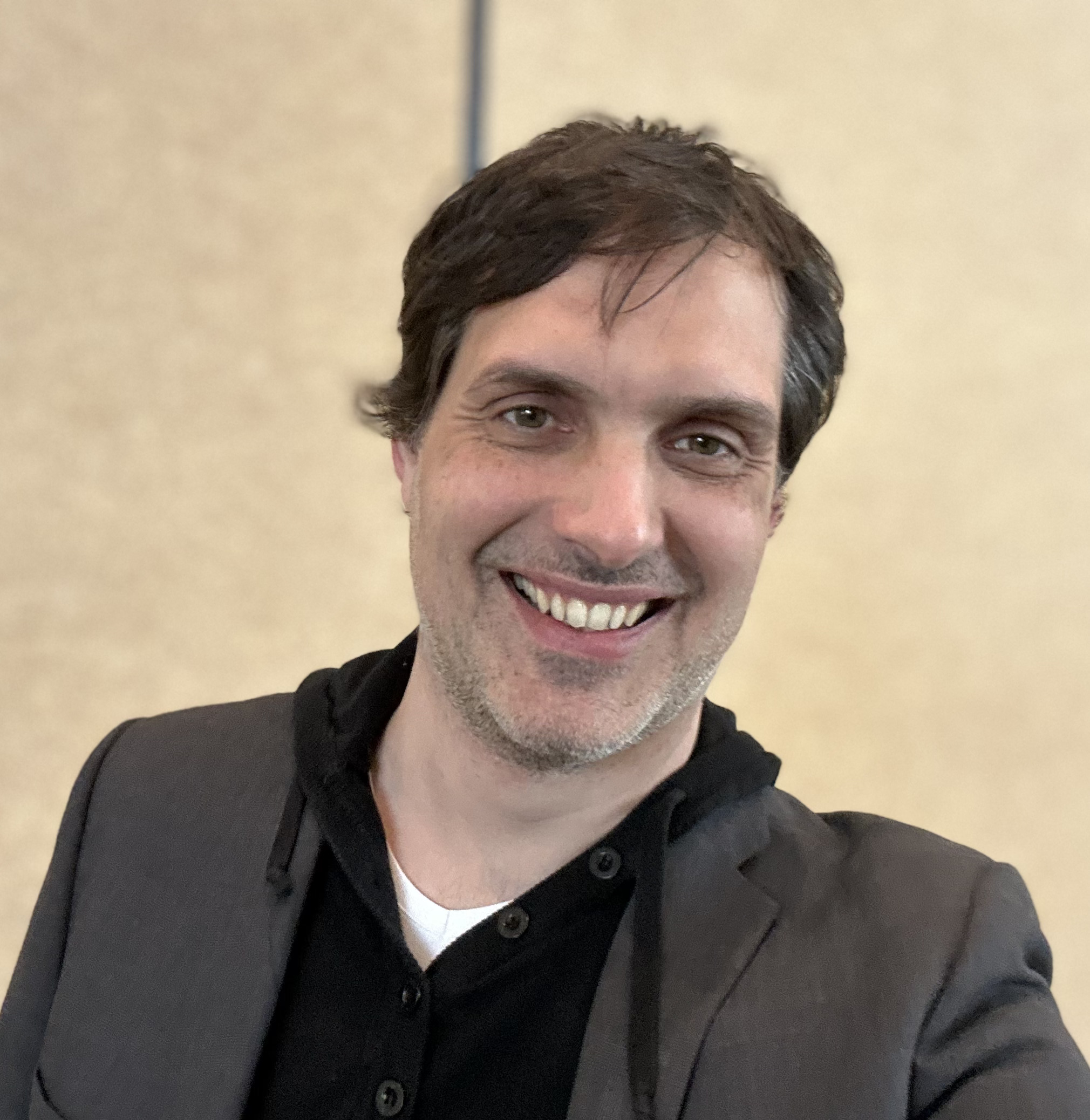
Olivier Derivière won Best Music in a Game for his work on South of Midnight.

The 15th New York Game Awards took place at the SVA Theatre on January 18, 2026, presented by Fils-Aimé and Goldberg. It was the second day of a new two-day festival by the NYVGCC, the first day consisting of industry panels. Nominees were announced on December 16, 2024, read by Ahmed Best and Kimari Rennis; Ghost of Yōtei led with four nominations. The media franchise Pokémon received the Andrew Yoon Legend Award as part of its 30th anniversary. A new category, Best New York Game, celebrates video games developed in New York City. Clair Obscur: Expedition 33 won the Big Apple Award for Game of the Year, and Jennifer English won the Great White Way Award for Best Acting for her role in the game.

| Category | Winner |
|---|---|
| Big Apple Award for Game of the Year | Clair Obscur: Expedition 33 |
| A-Train Award for Best Mobile Game | Is This Seat Taken? |
| Central Park Children's Zoo Award for Best Kids Game | Donkey Kong Bananza |
| High Line Award for Best Remake | The Elder Scrolls IV: Oblivion Remastered |
| Statue of Liberty Award for Best World | Hades II |
| Off Broadway Award for Best Indie Game | Blue Prince |
| Herman Melville Award for Best Writing in a Game | Blippo+ |
| Excelsior Award for Best New York Game | Ball x Pit |
| Coney Island Dreamland Award for Best AR/VR Game | Lumines Arise |
| Great White Way Award for Best Acting in a Game | Jennifer English as Maelle (Clair Obscur: Expedition 33) |
| Tin Pan Alley Award for Best Music in a Game | South of Midnight |
| Chumley's Speakeasy Award for Best Hidden Gem | News Tower |
| NYC GWB Award for Best DLC | Lies of P: Overture |
| Knickerbocker Award for Best Games Journalism | People Make Games |
| Andrew Yoon Legend Award | Pokémon |

=== 16th (2027) ===
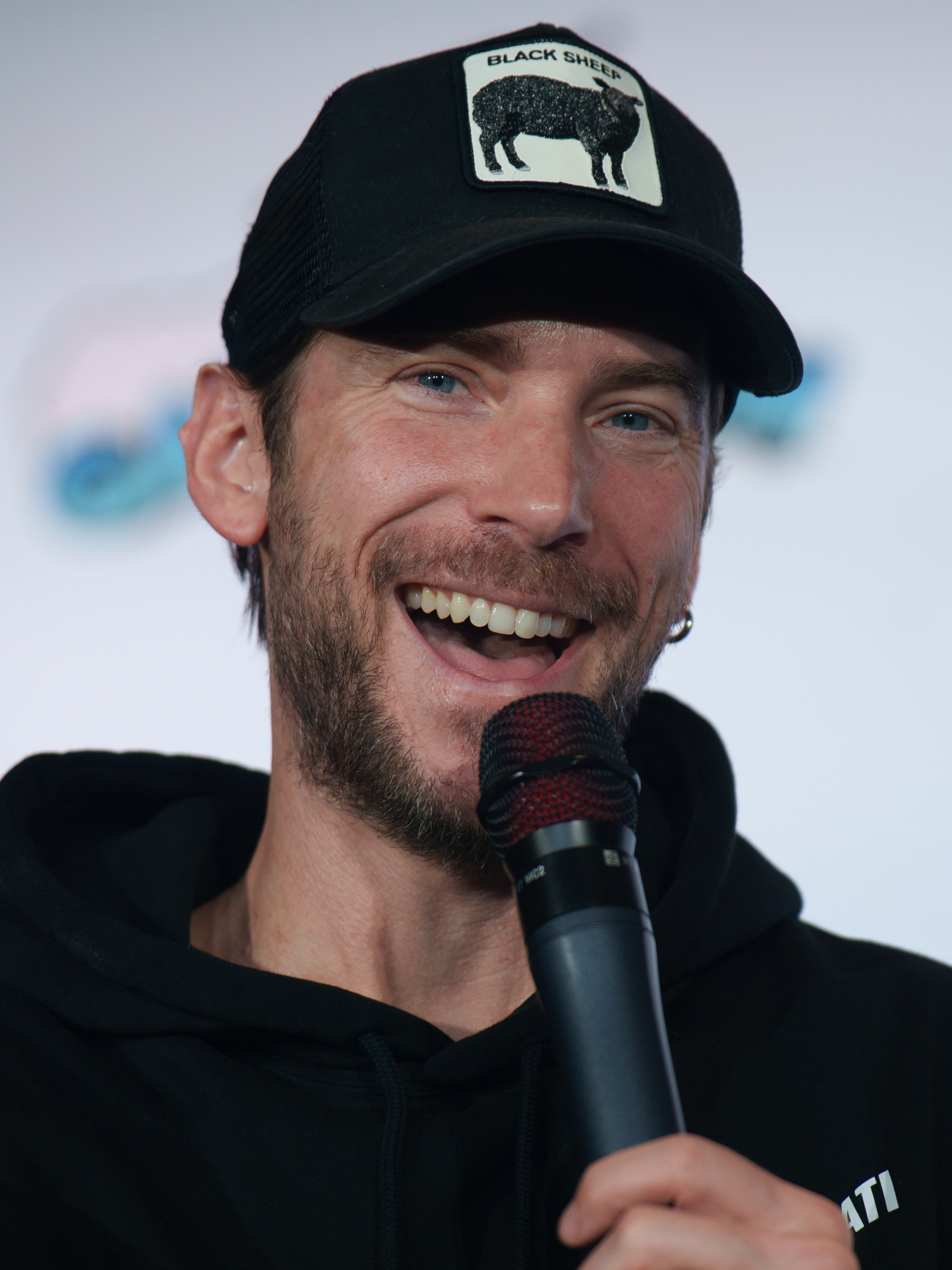
Troy Baker is set to receive the Andrew Yoon Legend Award in 2026.

The 16th New York Game Awards are set to take place at the SVA Theatre on January 19, 2026, presented by Lara Lunardi and Arda Ocal; Fils-Aimé and Goldberg will attend the event but not as hosts. Ocal previously presented an award in 2026. The event will be streamed on IGN's website and YouTube channel alongside the NYVGCC's established livestreams. Proceeds from the event support the NYVGCC's Playing with Purpose writing program. Troy Baker is set to receive the Andrew Yoon Legend Award for his video game performances, and he will perform a musical set at the SVA Theatre after the awards.
