= Cecilia D'Anastasio =

American video game journalist (born 1991)

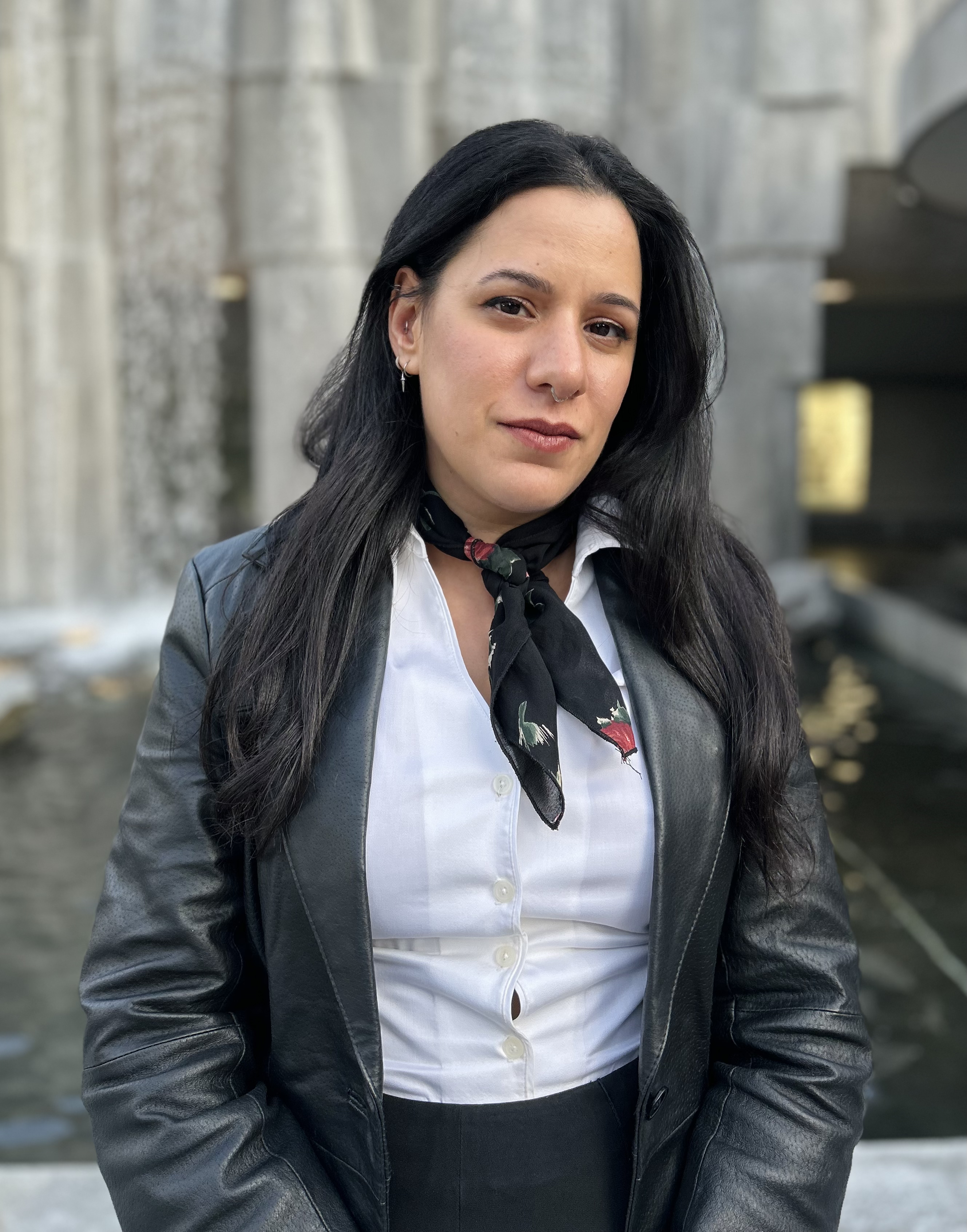
- Cecilia D'Anastasio in March 2025.
- Born: July 22, 1991 (age 35)
- Education: Reed College
- Occupation: Journalist
- Years active: 2014–present
- Known for: Video game journalism
- Website: cecianasta.com

Cecilia D'Anastasio (born July 22, 1991) is an American journalist who primarily covers the video game industry. From 2016 to 2020, D'Anastasio wrote for Kotaku, and she was recognized for a 2018 article reporting allegations of sexual harassment and gender discrimination at Riot Games. Subsequently, she wrote for Wired magazine and joined Bloomberg News in 2022 to cover the video game industry. While at Bloomberg, D'Anastasio won a 2024 George Polk Award for her reporting on child exploitation in Roblox.

== Education and early career ==
Cecilia D'Anastasio was born on July 22, 1991. She studied at Reed College, where she received a degree in classics. D'Anastasio did freelance work for several publications, including The Nation.

== Career ==
=== At Kotaku ===
D'Anastasio joined Kotaku as a staff writer in June 2016, focusing on investigative stories.

Her article "Inside The Culture Of Sexism At Riot Games", published in August 2018, details allegations of sexual harassment and gender discrimination at Riot Games according to the accounts of twenty-eight current and former employees. Following its publication, current and former employees also shared their own experiences regarding workplace harassment on social media. On the day of the publication, Riot Games released a statement generally addressing its workplace culture, hiring practices, and diversity and inclusion program in response to the allegations detailed in the article. Later that month, the company released a statement outlining its "first steps" towards addressing the allegations.

At the 71st Writers Guild of America Awards, D'Anastasio was presented with the Digital News award for the article. Variety described the article as "the most important piece of games reporting of the year, and maybe even years", naming D'Anastasio as one of the "Most Influential in Video Games" for the year of 2018. In the following year, the New York Videogame Critics Circle presented her with their "Knickerbocker Award for Best Games Journalism". D'Anastasio also made an appearance on Patriot Act with Hasan Minhaj, where she spoke about labor issues in the video game industry and her investigative work on Riot Games.

D'Anastasio left the publication in December 2019.

=== At Wired ===
D'Anastasio was hired as a staff writer for Wired magazine in 2020. In March, she received SXSW's inaugural Journalist of the Year award at the 2020 Gaming Awards for her "groundbreaking and influential" coverage of the video game industry. In October, the magazine launched its Wired Games section, which covers the video game industry. The section features work written by various staff writers including D'Anastasio. Later that year, Forbes named her to its 30 Under 30 list in the media category.

=== At Bloomberg News ===
After two years writing for Wired magazine, at the beginning of 2022 D'Anastasio joined Bloomberg News to cover the video game industry. D'Anastasio won the 2024 George Polk Award for Technology Reporting for her reporting on child exploitation in Roblox. For the same piece, she was a finalist for the 2025 ASME Awards.

== Selected publications ==
=== Bloomberg ===
- D'Anastasio, Cecilia. "Roblox Is Fighting to Keep Pedophiles Away and Not Always Winning". Bloomberg Businessweek. Archived from the original on February 5, 2025.
- D'Anastasio, Cecilia. "Roblox Lures Pro Game Developers Who Compete With Coding Kids". Bloomberg News. Archived from the original on March 20, 2023.
- D'Anastasio, Cecilia. "Twitch's New Star of Streaming Charts Is Anime Avatar Ironmouse". Bloomberg News. Archived from the original on January 9, 2023.
- D'Anastasio, Cecilia. "Can EA's FIFA-free soccer game win fans?". Bloomberg Businessweek. Archived from the original on March 12, 2024.
- D'Anastasio, Cecilia (September 20, 2024). "Xbox's President on Handheld Devices and Subscription Gaming". Bloomberg Businessweek.
- D'Anastasio, Cecilia. "Google and Microsoft Are Supercharging AI Deepfake Porn". Bloomberg News. Archived from the original on February 18, 2024.
- D'Anastasio, Cecilia. "US Malls Avoid Death Spiral With Help of Japanese Video Arcades". Bloomberg Businessweek. Archived from the original on June 18, 2024.
- D'Anastasio, Cecilia. "Xsolla's CEO Spends Like a Billionaire on Back of Company Cash". Bloomberg News. Archived from the original on August 28, 2024.

=== Kotaku ===
- D'Anastasio, Cecilia (August 7, 2018). "Inside The Culture Of Sexism At Riot Games". Kotaku.
- D'Anastasio, Cecilia (March 7, 2019). "Fantasy's Widow: The Fight Over The Legacy Of Dungeons & Dragons". Kotaku.
- D'Anastasio, Cecilia (August 26, 2019). "Dungeons & Deceptions: The First D&D Players Push Back On The Legend Of Gary Gygax". Kotaku.
- D'Anastasio, Cecilia (February 12, 2018). "Sex, Pong, And Pioneers: What Atari Was Really Like, According To Women Who Were There". Kotaku.
- D'Anastasio, Cecilia (May 23, 2019). "Shady Numbers And Bad Business: Inside The Esports Bubble". Kotaku.

=== Wired ===
- D'Anastasio, Cecilia (October 7, 2020). "Amazon Wants to 'Win at Games.' So Why Hasn't It?". Wired.
- D'Anastasio, Cecilia. "How 'Roblox' Became a Playground for Virtual Fascists". Wired.
- D'Anastasio, Cecilia. "Xbox Has Always Chased Power. That's Not Enough Anymore". Wired.
- D'Anastasio, Cecilia. "The Gritty, Underground Network Bringing Japan's Arcades to the US". Wired.
- D'Anastasio, Cecilia. "Pokimane Has Done Enough—and Has So Much Left to Do". Wired. ISSN 1059-1028.
- D'Anastasio, Cecilia. "In Minecraft's Dream SMP, All the Server's a Stage". Wired. ISSN 1059-1028.
- D'Anastasio, Cecilia. "Welcome to Planet Egirl". Wired. ISSN 1059-1028.
