= Joe Gideon & the Shark =

English blues/indie rock band

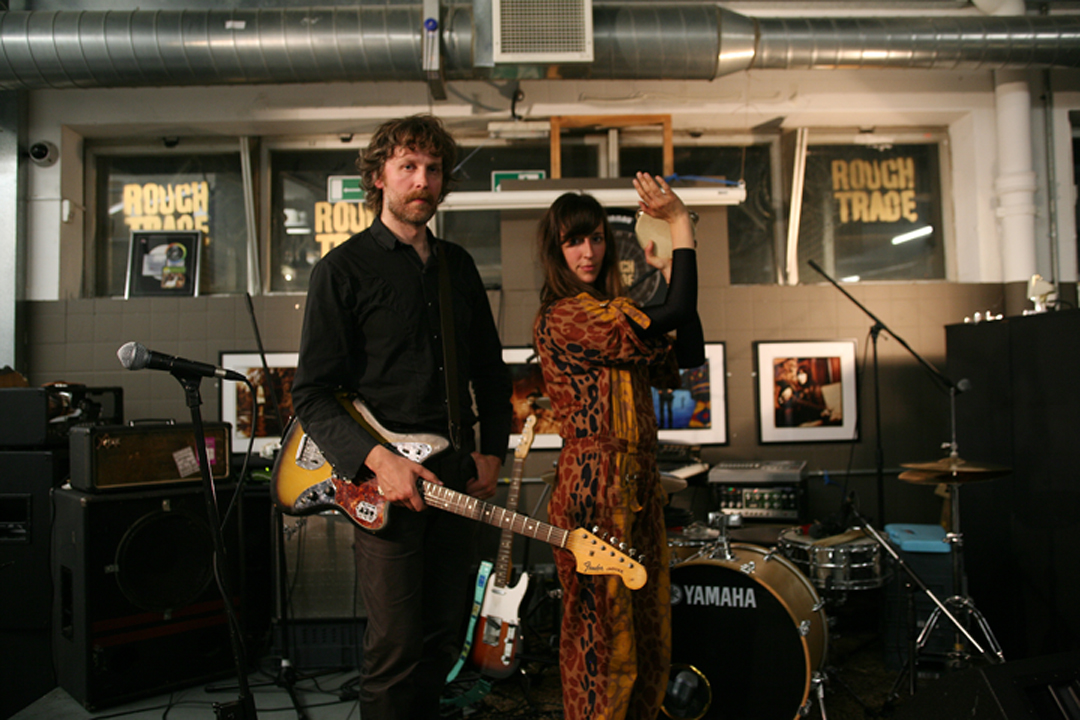

Background information
- Origin: London, England
- Genres: Blues rock, indie rock
- Years active: 2010–present
- Label: Bronzerat Records (UK)
- Members: Joe Gideon; Viva Seifert
- Website: https://www.joegideonandtheshark.com

Joe Gideon & the Shark is an English blues/indie rock band formed in London, England.

== History ==
After the disband of Bikini Atoll, Joe Gideon and his younger sister Viva Seifert formed Joe Gideon & the Shark. Gideon plays bass and guitar and sings, Seifert (The Shark) plays drums and piano and 8-track.

== Discography ==
=== Albums ===
- Harum Scarum (2010) Bronzerat Records
- Freakish (7 January 2013) Bronzerat Records
