= Bikini Atoll (band) =

English band

- Origin: London, UK
- Genres: Post-rock
- Years active: 1999–2006
- Label: Bella Union (UK)
- Spinoffs: Joe Gideon & the Shark
- Past members: Joe Gideon; Viva Seifert; Ché Albrighton; Bastian Juel
- Website: Batoll at the Wayback Machine (archived 3 February 2006)

Bikini Atoll were a post-rock band formed in London, though Ché Albrighton is from Jugenheim, Germany, and Bastian Juel is from Denmark. The band was signed to the Bella Union label in 2004. They released two albums, Moratoria in 2004 and Liar's Exit in 2005.

== History ==
Joe Gideon (real name Gideon Joel Seifert) is the older brother of Viva Seifert. Viva competed at the Barcelona Olympic Games in 1992 as a rhythmic gymnast, competing in the qualifying rounds. Ché Albrighton is the son of Roye Albrighton, the guitarist and vocalist of 1970s prog rock band Nektar. Bastian Juel moved to the UK in 1998.

Though the band was fully formed in 1999, they didn't do any formal recording until 2002, between August and October, when they recorded the Moratoria album. This was mastered between December of that year and January 2003. They were noticed by, former Cocteau Twins member, Simon Raymonde and signed to his record label, Bella Union. The album received a positive review in The Independent, being described as "...an awesome, soul-searching slice of sprawling Americana." and the Drowned in Sound website described the music as "...beautiful and deadly". The band was named after the atoll in The Marshall Islands named Bikini Atoll. The double-A-side release Desolation Highway/Then Amplify was runner up in NME's Single of The Week; "Desolation Highway" was also used in the film My Little Eye.

Liar's Exit was recorded and mixed by Steve Albini in Chicago, between 7–20 September 2004. It was then released in June 2005, again gaining encouraging reviews in both NME and Q Magazine. The single from this album, "Eve's Rib" was released in May 2005. After the release of this album, the band were invited to perform a session for Xfm.

Bikini Atoll disbanded in October 2006. The Seifert siblings formed Joe Gideon & the Shark. Ché Albrighton has played with Audioporn, Lynch Rider Lulu, and Clock Opera. Bastian Juel toured with Heather Nova.

In December 2024, the album Moratoria was re-released on vinyl.

== Band members ==
- Joe Gideon
- Viva Seifert
- Ché Albrighton
- Bastian Juel

== Discography ==
=== Studio albums ===
- Moratoria (February 2004) Bella Union
- Liar's Exit (CD and LP) (6 June 2005) Bella Union

=== Singles ===
- "Desolation Highway/Then Amplify" (January 2004) Bella Union
- "Cheap Trick" (June 2004) Bella Union
- "Eve's Rib" (CD and 7") (23 May 2005) Bella Union
