= Freakish (Joe Gideon & the Shark album) =

Studio album by Joe Gideon & The Shark
- Released: 7 January 2013
- Genre: Indie rock, blues rock
- Label: Bronzerat

Joe Gideon & The Shark chronology
Harum Scarum (2009)	Freakish (2013)

Singles from Freakish
- 1. "Poor Born" Released: 15 April 2013

Professional ratings
Aggregate scores
Source	Rating
Metacritic	65/100
Review scores
Source	Rating

Freakish is the second studio album by English rock band Joe Gideon & The Shark. It was released in January 2013 under Bronzerat Records.

== Track list ==
No.	Title	Length
1.	"I'm Ruined"	4:01
2.	"Snake Candy"	3:11
3.	"Poor Born"	3:01
4.	"The Insignificant Bullet"	4:21
5.	"You, The Pole And The Rastafarian"	3:44
6.	"Nine Bells of Hell"	6:04
7.	"Higher Power"	4:12
8.	"Freakish"	7:55
9.	"Friday 13"	3:34
