= WeatherGens =

'Brellina', this version represents the storm version which represents rain and thunder/lightning as she is struggling to hang on to her umbrella whereas the normal version depicts her holding on to her umbrella without a struggle

The WeatherGens were twelve fictional human characters representing the weather's various moods, televised in short segments to introduce ITV National Weather reports on ITV after ITN news bulletins from 1996 until 2001. They were created by Rob Kelly of Tutssels, a London-based advertising agency that was commissioned to produce the segments on behalf of the British energy supplier Powergen (now called E.ON UK), which sponsored ITV National Weather. The WeatherGens' costumes and make-up were designed by avant-garde creative partnership New Renaissance.

== Overview ==
The WeatherGens were twelve fictional human characters broadcast as short segments at the conclusion of ITN news bulletins and were also used to introduce the ITV weather forecast. Each character represented a specific mood of the weather: The female characters are Nimbella (cloud and rain/drizzle), Brellina (rain), three versions of Gilda (sunny/fair weather, sunshine and dark clouds/overcast and sunshine and showers), Crystella (snow), Florta (breezy), Cyan (cold weather conditions with Gilda), Mirka (fog and mist) and Aurora (dry and hot), while the male characters are Shivera (cold weather), Norwin (wind and windswept), Frice (ice and frost) and Helios (cloud and sun/morning mist). There were also storm versions of Breliina, Nimbella and Norwin which included thunder and/or lightning as part of the mood with Brellina struggling to hang on to her umbrella.

== Production ==
Powergen (now called E.ON UK), a British domestic electricity and gas supplier, commissioned the London-based advertising agency Tutssels to produce short clips to introduce weather forecasts on ITV, which Powergen had sponsored since 1989.

Collectively, the characters were named WeatherGens after Powergen and were created by Rob Kelly of Tutssels, who was advised by Powergen to make some of the models more threatening to reflect inclement weather. Carolyn Corben and Harvey Bertram-Brown of New Reconnaissance, an avant-garde creative partnership that designs costumes, television sets, and pop music videos, were responsible for designing the WeatherGens' costumes and make-up. All of the WeatherGen models were selected by International Weather Productions, the Met Office's business arm.

Corben said of the concept, "It was perfect for us. Our initial brief – well, it was like no brief at all to start with, we were told to go mad and not to rule anything out." The project cost £500,000 and it took seven months to complete each of the 15-second shots with six people from outside New Renaissance employed to assist in the project. It was filmed in the style of a television advert, a route considered "radical" by Corben. Each shoot was completed in one day and the film crew had to maintain stability of the costumes between shots in order to avoid injuring the models. The WeatherGens were first shown on television on 20 November 1996, and received letters of praise but were criticised for scaring young children.

== Retirement ==
In May 2001 Powergen began reviewing its creative account for the ITV weather forecast with eight undisclosed agencies for a new brand of weather segments. It selected the marketing agency Soul to produce the segments, which depicted individuals and businesses undertaking a range of daily activities and the weather was utilised to represent their differing moods. The WeatherGens were last shown on-screen on 19 October 2001.

== Other uses ==
The WeatherGens were used by the international environmental network movement Friends of the Earth who distributed leaflets outside Powergen's annual general meeting at the ICC Birmingham on 13 July 1998 as part of its campaign to convince the energy company to increase its investment in renewable energy sources.
