= Genese =

Genese is both a surname and a given name. Notable people with the name include:

- Frank Genese, American architect and politician
- Robert William Genese (1848–1928), Irish mathematician
- Genese Davis (born 1984), American writer
