= South of Midnight =

- Developer: Compulsion Games
- Publisher: Xbox Game Studios (Note: Self-published on Steam by Compulsion Games since 2026)
- Directors: David Sears; Jasmin Roy
- Producer: Geneviève Forget
- Designer: Alexandre Béland-Bernard
- Programmer: Clément Robein
- Artist: Whitney Clayton
- Writer: Zaire Lanier
- Composer: Olivier Deriviere
- Engine: Unreal Engine 4
- Platforms: Windows; Xbox Series X/S; Nintendo Switch 2; PlayStation 5
- Release: Windows, Xbox Series X/S; April 8, 2025; PlayStation 5, Switch 2; March 31, 2026
- Genre: Action-adventure
- Mode: Single-player

South of Midnight is a 2025 action-adventure game developed by Compulsion Games and published by Xbox Game Studios. The game is set in a fictionalized American Deep South. It was released for Windows and Xbox Series X/S on April 8, 2025, with versions for Nintendo Switch 2 and PlayStation 5 released on March 31, 2026.

The game received generally positive reviews from critics. It won the Games for Impact award at The Game Awards 2025, Outstanding Achievement in Animation at the 29th Annual D.I.C.E. Awards, Best Character Animation in a Video Game at the 53rd Annie Awards, and Best New Intellectual Property at the 22nd British Academy Games Awards.

== Gameplay ==
Hazel, the player character, must fight against "Haints", nightmarish creatures who become the physical manifestation of past traumas.

South of Midnight is a third-person action-adventure game. Players take on the role of Hazel, who learns an ancient weaving power to explore the Deep South mythos. Throughout her journey, she must cleanse "Stigma" and defeat enemies known as "Haints", both of which are physical manifestations of deep-rooted sorrows and trauma that had festered for decades. The game emulates stop-motion animation for its cutscenes; it provides an option for players to toggle it off.

Hazel's primary weapons are a pair of hooks. Five consecutive melee attacks form a combo, damaging enemies significantly. She can perform a quick dodge to evade attack. If she is able to dodge just before an opponent's attack lands, she will trigger a strand blast that damages nearby enemies. Enemies attacks can be interrupted, though unavoidable attacks (indicated to the player when an enemy's health bar turns yellow), must be dodged. Hazel can cast magical spells during combat, with a short cooldown time following each usage. With her magic, she can stun an enemy, push them away or pull them towards her. Hazel is equipped with a small puppet known as Crouton; throwing it at an enemy will cause them to attack their allies for a brief period of time. Combat encounters occur in an arena that is cordoned off upon entry; players must defeat all enemies in the arena before they can progress. Hazel can either "unravel" a downed Haint, or consume a green health sigil which can only be used once in each arena, to replenish health during combat.

Hazel can perform highly acrobatic skills such as double jumping, wall running, and gliding through the air. The game is largely linear, and players can summon a guiding strand to lead them to their next objective. If players explore off the beaten track, they may find "Floofs", which can be used to purchase combat upgrades or abilities, or "health filaments", which increase Hazel's maximum health. Crouton can squeeze into small tunnels Hazel typically cannot fit through. Hazel can use her powers in both transversal and puzzle-solving. For instance, she can solidify "Echo" objects from the past and use them to reach previously inaccessible areas. The game's world is filled with environmental hazards such as explosive mushrooms and spiking thorns, both of which must be avoided. Players will encounter several mythical creatures, some of which serve as boss battles. Many of these mythical creatures are haunted by events of the past. As a Weaver, Hazel can gather their painful memories and contain them using a magical bottle, and place them on a bottle tree to resolve their past trauma, enabling them to move on.

== Plot ==
=== Premise ===
South of Midnight is set in a Gothic fantasy American Deep South setting. The game follows Hazel Flood (Adriyan Rae) on her journey after a hurricane devastates her hometown of Prospero. Pulled into a Southern Gothic reality where folklore creatures emerge, Hazel must become a Weaver—a magical mender of broken bonds and spirits. Along the way, Hazel encounters all kinds of mythical creatures based on Southern American legends such as Two-Toed Tom, Rougarou, Altamaha-ha, Huggin' Molly and Kooshma. As she confronts enemy creatures known as Haints and untangles her family's past, Hazel seeks to reweave the tears in the Grand Tapestry and find a place that feels like home.

=== Synopsis ===
Hazel Flood helps her mother Lacey (Cynthia K. McWilliams) prepare to evacuate their house in the wake of an approaching hurricane. They get into an argument when Hazel accuses her mother of caring more about random strangers than her daughter and leaves the house. As Hazel leaves, the house is washed away by a flash flood with Lacey still inside, and Hazel desperately tries to chase it, catching sight of "Strands" along the way. Unable to catch up to the house, Hazel turns to her estranged grandmother Bunny (Debra Cardona) for help. Upon hearing that Hazel can see the Strands, Bunny attempts to trap Hazel in her mansion. Hazel escapes and continues to search for Lacey. Hazel recovers several enchanted tools that allow her to manipulate the Strand and fight Haints that begin appearing to attack her. As she proceeds further down the river, she increasingly begins to become aware of more supernatural phenomena.

Hazel comes across and helps a giant Catfish (Walter Roberts), who agrees to help her find Lacey as well as tell her more about her powers. Catfish explains that Hazel is a Weaver, an individual who can perceive and tap into the power of the Strands which they use to battle Haints and repair the Grand Tapestry that ties all creation together. Continuing her journey, Hazel comes across several monsters that are the manifestations of human and animal spirits twisted by negative emotions, which she heals by "bottling" up their negative emotions and confronting the monsters in battle to untangle their "knots". She finds the remains of her home, but there is no sign of Lacey besides red yarn. Catfish warns that the red yarn means that Lacey was likely abducted by Huggin' Molly, another supernatural monster. He explains that Bunny is the only person who has ever fought Molly and won, rescuing Hazel's father Trey from Molly's grasp when he was a child.

Hazel explores Bunny's unoccupied weekend cottage for clues on Molly's whereabouts. Reliving the memories she finds there, Hazel discovers that her father Trey (Jim Conway) accidentally killed his younger sister Cherie (Auguste Lercher) when they were young children, when Trey dropped Cherie in the river in attempt to clean the girl's dress when it got dirty. Cherie was Bunny's favorite of her two children, and she never forgave Trey for Cherie's death. Hazel also uncovers all of Bunny's secret research into Weavers and the supernatural creatures in the area, including Huggin' Molly. Bunny confronts Hazel at the cottage and agrees to help her, explaining that Molly once abducted Trey as bait since she was Molly's real target, so Molly may be using Lacey as bait for Hazel as well. Bunny gives Hazel information on how to find Molly's lair. Before leaving the cottage, Hazel finds that Bunny had confined Cherie's spirit in a tree, not allowing her to rest so that Bunny might one day resurrect her. Hazel uses her powers as a Weaver to heal Cherie's "knot" and hopefully allow her spirit to finally move on. Catfish warns Hazel that Bunny can't be trusted, pointing out that she will resort to any means to resurrect Cherie. Ignoring Catfish's warnings, Hazel then invades Molly's lair and confronts the creature. After defeating Molly, Hazel realizes too late that Lacey and Molly were actually working together to rescue children who were being abused by their parents, and Molly was attempting to heal Lacey. However, Bunny arrives and takes advantage of Molly's weakened state, killing her and stealing her heart which she plans to use to resurrect Cherie.

Bunny shoves Hazel off of a cliff to her apparent death. Suffering a near-death experience, Hazel encounters Roux (Ahmed Best), a dark spirit who informs her Lacey's soul is trapped in the realm of Kooshma, the King of Dreams and Nightmares. Upon arriving in Kooshma's realm, Hazel frees Lacey's soul from Kooshma with Roux's help, and in exchange Roux gives Hazel an enchanted hairbrush and instructs her to give it to Bunny. He reveals that Bunny is a "False Stitcher", a person who has obtained Weaver powers through dark magic which is tearing apart the Great Tapestry. Hazel returns to the human realm where she reunites and makes amends with Lacey. She confronts Bunny, who is distraught that her ritual to revive Cherie with Molly's heart had failed, likely because of Hazel's earlier intervention at Cherie's tree. Hazel gives Bunny the brush and Roux appears, offering to take Bunny to Kooshma's realm so she can live in an illusion of raising Cherie. Bunny accepts the offer and leaves with Roux, and Hazel embraces her new role as a Weaver, keeping watch over her hometown for supernatural threats.

== Development ==
South of Midnight was developed by Compulsion Games, the creators of We Happy Few and Contrast. It marks Compulsion's first game developed under Xbox Game Studios, following their acquisition by the company in 2018. The game was originally developed under the codename "Project Midnight". Details of the game first leaked via Windows Central in 2021, where concept art was revealed. The game was announced at Xbox Games Showcase on June 11, 2023, during Summer Game Fest. On June 9, 2024, Compulsion Games showcased the first gameplay trailer for the game and announced that it would be released in 2025.

The stop-motion cutscenes were created with the help of Clyde Henry Productions. Maquettes of clay stop motion figures were used to create the art style. The game has a dark modern folktale driven by character development, lyrical music inspired by the American South, and a narrative that delves into Southern folklore.

== Release ==
South of Midnight was released on April 8, 2025 for Windows and Xbox Series X/S. It became available on Xbox Game Pass on its day of release. Pre-ordering the premium edition of the game granted early access from April 3.

On March 6, 2026, it was announced that South of Midnight would be releasing on PlayStation 5 and Nintendo Switch 2 on March 31.

Following its split from Xbox and return as an independent studio in 2026, Compulsion Games retained the rights to South of Midnight. The studio started self-publishing the game on Steam starting from August 2026.

== Reception ==
Reception

Aggregate scores
Aggregator	Score
Metacritic	(PC) 75/100 (XSXS) 78/100
OpenCritic	68% recommend

Review scores
Publication	Score
Destructoid	9/10
Eurogamer	3/5
GameSpot	8/10
GamesRadar+	3.5/5
Hardcore Gamer	4/5
IGN	8/10
PC Gamer (US)	83/100
PCGamesN	6/10
Shacknews	8/10
The Guardian	3/5
Video Games Chronicle	3/5

South of Midnight received "generally favorable" reviews from critics, according to review aggregator website Metacritic. OpenCritic determined that 68% recommended the game.

Kristina Ebanez from Destructoid called the game "A hallmark of excellence. There may be flaws, but they are negligible and won't cause massive damage." Eurogamer's Chris Tapsell says "It's one of the best sounding games I've played in an age, with a highly unique, artfully implemented original score woven into its sound design. And it's also extremely well acted, a cut above the vast majority of video games in emotional authenticity and heft. But goodness me can it get tiresome to play." From GameSpot, Jordan Ramée said that the game "makes up for its orthodox gameplay with a fantastic story, well-researched setting, and an incredibly catchy lyric-driven soundtrack.

Jasmine Gould-Wilson from GamesRadar said that the game "is a charming (if predictable) action-adventure experience that's perfectly happy to play it safe." Hardcore Gamer's Parker Green praised the game's unique and gorgeous setting, deep and thoughtful storytelling, and dynamic stop-motion art style while criticising its underwhelming combat, some visual glitches, and art style that can be hard to interpret at times.

Michael Higham from IGN said the game "is a straightforward but well-executed action-adventure game elevated by the artistry and heart of the American Southern culture that’s wrapped around it." Andrea Shearon from PC Gamer said that the game's "action may not have the strongest hook, but its poignant tale of hope and sorrow tailored to Deep South mythos keeps its head raised high." From PCGamesN, Lauren Bergin said that it "is a monotonous action-adventure game plagued by boring, repetitive fights and boss battles, with a story that loses momentum when it needs it most. Thankfully, its strong characterization, setting, and soundtrack do a lot of the heavy lifting."

Shacknews' Donovan Erskine praised its well-paced story, awesome protagonist, gothic fantasy and stop-motion animation while criticising the game's generic combat and progression. Chris Scullion from Video Games Chronicle said the game "is a gorgeous adventure with wonderful performances, striking visuals and solid platforming gameplay. Its combat, however, is repetitive and reductive in equal measure, letting the overall package down considerably."

=== Awards ===
Year	Award	Category	Result	Ref.
2025	Golden Joystick Awards 2025	Best Soundtrack	Nominated	
2025	Golden Joystick Awards 2025	Best Lead Performer (Adriyan Rae)	Nominated	
2025	The Game Awards 2025	Games for Impact	Won	
2025	The Game Awards 2025	Innovation in Accessibility	Nominated	
2026	15th New York Game Awards	Great White Way Award for Best Acting in a Game (Adriyan Rae)	Nominated	
2026	15th New York Game Awards	Tin Pan Alley Award for Best Music in a Game	Won	
2026	29th Annual D.I.C.E. Awards	Outstanding Achievement in Animation	Won	
2026	29th Annual D.I.C.E. Awards	Outstanding Achievement in Story	Nominated	
2026	53rd Annie Awards	Best Character Animation – Video Game	Won	
2026	International Film Music Critics Association Awards 2025	Best Original Score for a Video Game or Interactive Media	Nominated	
2026	24th Game Audio Network Guild Awards	Best Ensemble Cast Performance	Nominated	
2026	24th Game Audio Network Guild Awards	Best New Original IP Audio	Nominated	
2026	24th Game Audio Network Guild Awards	Best Original Song ("Altamaha-Ha" by Olivier Deriviere)	Nominated	
2026	24th Game Audio Network Guild Awards	Best Original Soundtrack Album	Nominated	
2026	26th Game Developers Choice Awards	Best Audio	Nominated	
2026	22nd British Academy Games Awards	Artistic Achievement	Nominated	
2026	22nd British Academy Games Awards	New Intellectual Property	Won	
2026	24th Visual Effects Society Awards	Outstanding Visual Arts in a Real-Time Project	Nominated	
2026	Canadian Game Awards 2026	Game of the Year	Won	
2026	Canadian Game Awards 2026	Best Game Design	Won	
2026	Canadian Game Awards 2026	Best Narrative	Won	
2026	Canadian Game Awards 2026	Best Art Direction	Won	
2026	Canadian Game Awards 2026	Best Audio Design	Won	
2026	Canadian Game Awards 2026	Best Score/Soundtrack	Won	
2026	Canadian Game Awards 2026	Best Console Game	Won	
2026	Canadian Game Awards 2026	Innovation in Accessibility	Nominated	
