= Alex Epstein (screenwriter) =

Canadian-American writer (born 1963)

- Born: January 26, 1963 (age 63); New York City, New York
- Citizenship: American, Canadian
- Education: Yale University; UCLA School of Theater, Film and Television
- Occupations: Film writer; television writer; video game writer; fiction writer; film producer; film director; educator
- Notable work: Bon Cop, Bad Cop; We Happy Few
- Spouse: Lisa Hunter Epstein
- Awards: Canadian Comedy Award

Alex Epstein (born January 26, 1963) is a dual citizen American Canadian writer, film producer, director, and educator.

== Career ==
Alex Epstein began his writing career as an author of short stories for literary magazines. In Hollywood, he worked as a development executive for independent films, including with his own and Angelique Gulermovich Epstein's company Muse of Fire, and as a vice-president of Blue Rider Pictures. His first film writing credit was for 1994's Warriors.

In Montreal, he co-created and co-wrote the comedy television series Naked Josh and co-wrote the buddy cop crime film Bon Cop, Bad Cop. He was head writer (executive story editor) for the second half of the sci-fi series Charlie Jade with writer credit on three episodes. He has also written and directed several short films, and wrote young adult historical fantasy novel The Circle Cast: The Lost Years of Morgan le Fay.

Epstein has worked in the video game industry as the story and voice director of Contrast by Compulsion Games. For Spearhead Games' Stories: The Path of Destinies, he was brought in to assist with the branching storylines and to add humor. He returned to work for Compulsion Games as the narrative director of We Happy Few.

=== Selected writing credits ===
- Vampire High (2001) (TV series)
- Galidor: Defenders of the Outer Dimension (2002) (TV series)
- 15/Love (2004–2005) (TV series)
- Naked Josh (2004–2006) (TV series)
- Charlie Jade (2005) (TV series)
- Bon Cop, Bad Cop (2006) (film)
- Contrast (2013) (video game)
- Stories: The Path of Destinies (2016) (video game)
- We Happy Few (2018) (video game)

=== Awards ===
He was part of the writing team along with Patrick Huard, Leila Bason and Kevin Tierney that was nominated for the Prix Iris (Best Screenplay) and won the Canadian Comedy Award (Best Writing) for Bon Cop, Bad Cop in 2007. Naked Josh which he co-wrote with Laura Kosterski and the short film Role Play which he co-wrote with Lisa Hunter, have been nominated for the WGC Screenwriting Awards in 2005, 2006, and 2014. The Circle Cast was shortlisted for the Quebec Writers' Federation Awards (QWF Prize for Children's and Young Adult Literature) in 2011.

=== Education ===
In addition, Epstein is also a screenwriting teacher. Crafty Screenwriting: Writing Movies That Get Made, published in 2002, is a screenwriting manual for feature films, derived from his career in development. In 2006, he wrote Crafty TV Writing: Thinking Inside the Box, focusing on his experiences in television and guiding writers in creating series and pilots. He also has a tie-in blog, "Complications Ensue".

== Personal life ==
Raised in New York, Epstein graduated from the Yale in 1985 in Computer Science and English and has lived in France for a year. Afterwards he graduated from the UCLA School of Theater, Film and Television and has worked in Los Angeles for a decade, before eventually moving to Montreal, Canada.
