= 29th Annual D.I.C.E. Awards =

2026 video-game awards event

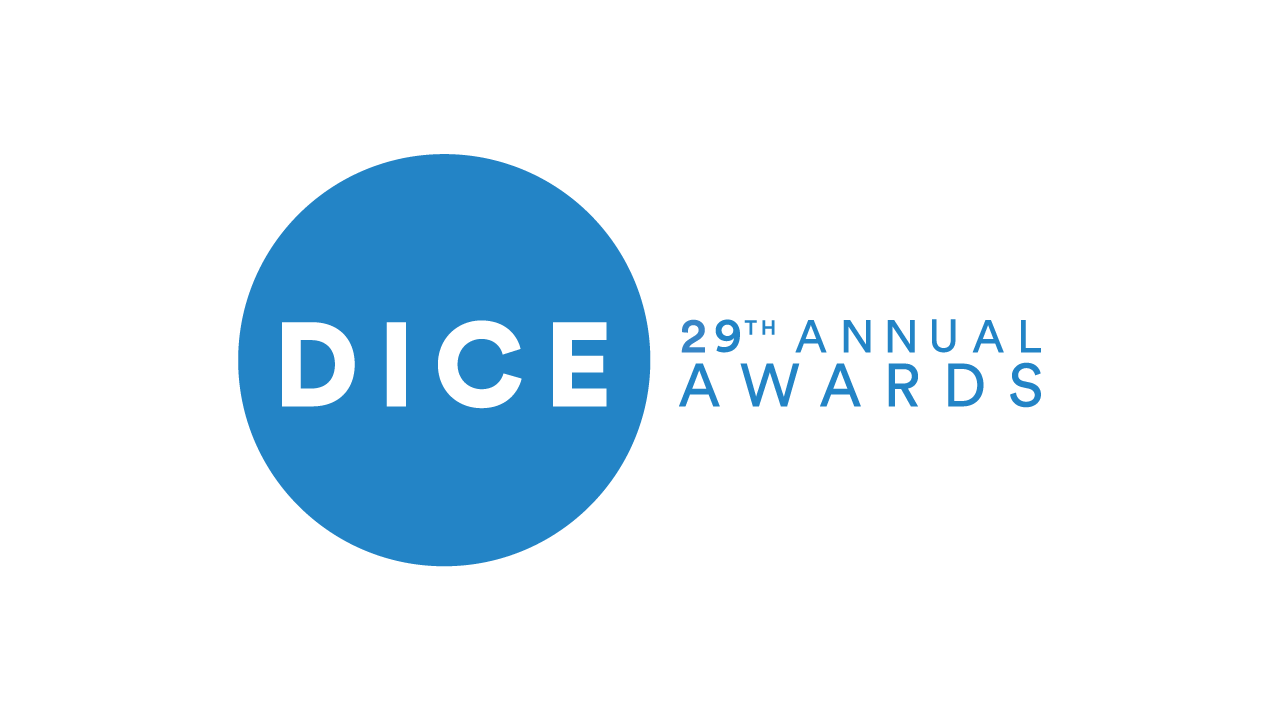
- Date: February 12, 2026
- Venue: Aria Resort & Casino
- Hosted by: Stella Chung, Greg Miller

Highlights
- Most awards: Clair Obscur: Expedition 33 (5)
- Most nominations: Clair Obscur: Expedition 33; Ghost of Yōtei (8)
- Game of the Year: Clair Obscur: Expedition 33
- Hall of Fame: Evan Wells

The 29th Annual D.I.C.E. Awards was the 29th edition of the D.I.C.E. Awards ("Design Innovate Communicate Entertain"), an annual awards event that honored the best games in the video game industry during 2025. The awards ceremony was arranged by the Academy of Interactive Arts & Sciences (AIAS), and was part of the 2026 D.I.C.E. Summit. The ceremony occurred on February 12, 2026, at the Aria Resort & Casino in Las Vegas, Nevada. Greg Miller of Kinda Funny Games and Stella Chung, formerly of IGN, returned as hosts for the ceremony. The nominees were announced on January 8, 2026.

Sandfall Interactive's Clair Obscur: Expedition 33 and Sucker Punch Productions' Ghost of Yōtei topped the list with 8 nominations, with the former winning the most awards of the ceremony with 5 accolades, including "Game of the Year". Embark Studios' ARC Raiders and AdHoc Studio's Dispatch garnered 6 nominations each, followed by Dogubomb's Blue Prince earning 5 total nominations with Kojima Productions' Death Stranding 2: On the Beach close behind with 4 nominations. Sony Interactive Entertainment garnered the most nominations amongst publishers, while Electronic Arts published the most nominated games. Kepler Interactive won the most awards as a publisher, and tied with Sony Interactive Entertainment for publishing the most award-winning games.

Evan Wells, former president of Naughty Dog and lead designer for Crash Bandicoot: Warped and the Jak & Daxter games, received the Academy's Hall of Fame Award.

== Winners and nominees ==
Winners are listed first, highlighted in boldface, and indicated with a double dagger (‡).

=== Game of the Year awards ===
**Game of the Year**: **Clair Obscur: Expedition 33 (Sandfall Interactive, Kepler Interactive) — Guillaume Broche, Tom Guillermin, François Meurisse**‡; ARC Raiders (Embark Studios) — Aleksander Grøndal, Stefan Strandberg, Virgil Watkins; Blue Prince (Dogubomb, Raw Fury) — Tonda Ros; Dispatch (AdHoc Studio) — Nick Herman, Dennis Lenart, Pierre Shorette, Natalie Herman; Ghost of Yōtei (Sucker Punch Productions, Sony Interactive Entertainment) — Brian Fleming, Jason Connell, Nate Fox	**Online Game of the Year**: **ARC Raiders (Embark Studios) — Virgil Watkins, Robert Träffe**‡; Battlefield 6 (Battlefield Studios, Electronic Arts) — Christian Grass, Thomas 'Tompen' Andersson, Ryan McArthur; Mario Kart World (Nintendo EPD) — Yugo Hayashi, Wataru Hinoshita; Marvel Rivals (NetEase Games) — Weicong Wu, Guangyn Chen, Fan Feng; Split Fiction (Hazelight Studios, Electronic Arts) — Josef Fares, Aimar Bergan, Oskar Wolontis
**Mobile Game of the Year**: **Persona 5: The Phantom X (Black Wings Game Studio, Sega) — Yusuke Nitta, Zhen Wang, Yuta Sakai, Yohsuke Uda, Lao V, Jun Matsunaga**‡; Umamusume: Pretty Derby (Cygames) — Koichi Watanabe; What the Clash? (Triband) — Tim Garbos, Daniel Traun-Terkelsen, Christen Lorensen; Where Winds Meet (Everstone Studio, NetEase Games) — Beralt Lyu	**Outstanding Achievement for an Independent Game**: **Blue Prince (Dogubomb, Raw Fury) — Tonda Ros**‡; Baby Steps (Devolver Digital) — Gabe Cuzzillo, Maxi Boch, Bennett Foddy; Consume Me (Hexecutable LLC) — Jenny Jiao Hsia, AP Thomson, Jie En Lee, Violet W-P, Ken "coda" Snyder; Despelote (Panic Inc.) — Julián Cordero, Sebastián Valbuena, Gabe Cuzzillo; Dispatch (AdHoc Studio) — Nick Herman, Dennis Lenart, Pierre Shorette, Natalie Herman

=== Immersive Reality awards ===
**Immersive Reality Game of the Year**: **Ghost Town (Fireproof Studios) — Mark Hamilton, Rob Dodd, Tom Seed**‡; Demeo x Dungeons & Dragons: Battlemarked (Resolution Games) — Gustav Stenmark, Parvathy Menon; Marvel's Deadpool VR (Twisted Pixel Games, Oculus Studios) — Josh Bear, Dan Bullock, Jody Coglianese; The Midnight Walk (MoonHood, Fast Travel Games) — Klaus Lyngeled, Olov Redmalm; Thief VR: Legacy of Shadow (Maze Theory, Vertigo Games) — Russ Harding, Steven Gallagher, Nick Witsel	**Immersive Reality Technical Achievement**: **Hotel Infinity (Studio Chyr) — William Chyr, Tara Quinsac, Tyler LaGrange, Tanner Davis, Melody Yang, Arthur Brussee, Oscar De Anda, Nick Williams, Jacob Mooney, Sydney Glenn, August Brown**‡; Ghost Town (Fireproof Studios) — Mark Hamilton, Rob Dodd, Dave Smeathers, Simon Fawcett, Ethan Prime; Marvel's Deadpool VR (Twisted Pixel Games, Oculus Studios) — Frank Wilson, Gabe Farris, Mike Henry, Patrick Christenson, Naveen Nattam; Star Wars: Beyond Victory - A Mixed Reality Playset (Industrial Light & Magic, Disney Electronic Content) — Kay Nestor, Jimmy Roznick; Unloop (Superposition NULL, CM Games) — Anastasia Rumyantseva, Artem Suleimanov, Nikolai Zharkov

=== Craft awards ===
**Outstanding Achievement in Game Direction**: **Clair Obscur: Expedition 33 (Sandfall Interactive, Kepler Interactive) — Guillaume Broche**‡; Blue Prince (Dogubomb, Raw Fury) — Tonda Ros; Ghost of Yōtei (Sucker Punch Productions, Sony Interactive Entertainment) — Jason Connell, Nate Fox; Hades II (Supergiant Games) — Greg Kasavin, Amir Rao, Gavin Simon, Darren Korb, Jen Zee, Andrew Wang; Kingdom Come: Deliverance II (Warhorse Studios, Deep Silver) — Daniel Vávra	**Outstanding Achievement in Game Design**: **Blue Prince (Dogubomb, Raw Fury) — Tonda Ros**‡; ARC Raiders (Embark Studios) — Virgil Watkins; Hades II (Supergiant Games) — Amir Rao, Gavin Simon, Greg Kasavin, Alice Lai, Eduardo Gorinstein, James Auck; Kingdom Come: Deliverance II (Warhorse Studios, Deep Silver) — Viktor Bocan, Prokop Jirsa; Öoo (NamaTakahashi) — Nama Takahashi, Hachinos, Tsuyomi
**Outstanding Achievement in Animation**: **South of Midnight (Compulsion Games, Xbox Game Studios) — Mike Jungbluth, Vincent Schneider, Sebastien Dussault, Remi Emond, Ahmed Best**‡; Death Stranding 2: On the Beach (Kojima Productions, Sony Interactive Entertainment) — Hideo Kojima, Masaaki Kawata, Ray Khalastchi; Ghost of Yōtei (Sucker Punch Productions, Sony Interactive Entertainment) — Billy Harper, Jordan Pitchon, Kento Kojima; Monster Hunter Wilds (Capcom) — Kenji Yamaguchi, Hiroya Sasaki, Masaya Onai; The Midnight Walk (MoonHood, Fast Travel Games) — Lucas Åsaborn	**Outstanding Achievement in Art Direction**: **Clair Obscur: Expedition 33 (Sandfall Interactive, Kepler Interactive) — Nicholas Maxson-Francombe**‡; Death Stranding 2: On the Beach (Kojima Productions, Sony Interactive Entertainment) — Hideo Kojima, Yoji Shinkawa, Megan Tuckwell; Dispatch (AdHoc Studio) — Derek Stratton; Ghost of Yōtei (Sucker Punch Productions, Sony Interactive Entertainment) — Jason Connell, Joanna Wang; The Midnight Walk (MoonHood, Fast Travel Games) — Victor Becker, Klaus Lyngeled
**Outstanding Achievement in Character**: **Atsu, Ghost of Yōtei (Sucker Punch Productions, Sony Interactive Entertainment) — Actor: Erika Ishii; Creative Director: Nate Fox; Lead Writer: Ian Ryan**‡; Esquie, Clair Obscur: Expedition 33 (Sandfall Interactive, Kepler Interactive) — Performance: Maxence Cazorla; Writers: Jennifer Svedberg-Yen, Guillame Broche; Maelle, Clair Obscur: Expedition 33 (Sandfall Interactive, Kepler Interactive) — Performance: Jennifer English; Writers: Jennifer Svedberg-Yen, Guillame Broche; Courtney/Invisigal, Dispatch (AdHoc Studio) — Voice Actor: Laura Bailey; Narrative Director: Pierre Shorette; Creative Directors: Nick Herman, Dennis Lenart; Robert Robertson III/Mecha Man, Dispatch (AdHoc Studio) — Voice Actor: Aaron Paul; Narrative Director: Pierre Shorette; Creative Directors: Nick Herman, Dennis Lenart	**Outstanding Achievement in Original Music Composition**: **Ghost of Yōtei (Sucker Punch Productions, Sony Interactive Entertainment) — Toma Otowa, Keith Leary, Peter Scaturro**‡; Clair Obscur: Expedition 33 (Sandfall Interactive, Kepler Interactive) — Lorien Testard, Alice Duport-Percier; Herdling (Okomotive, Panic Inc.) — Joel Schoch; Mario Kart World (Nintendo EPD) — Atsuko Asahi; Sword of the Sea (Giant Squid) — Austin Wintory
**Outstanding Achievement in Audio Design**: **Death Stranding 2: On the Beach (Kojima Productions, Sony Interactive Entertainment) — Hideo Kojima, Hiroyuki Hakayama, Justin Scott Wilson, Alex Previty, Noburo Masuda, Derrick Espino, Andres Herrera, Emile Mika, Stephen Schappler**‡; ARC Raiders (Embark Studios) — Bence Pajor, Olof Strömqvist, Simon Svanbäck; Ghost of Yōtei (Sucker Punch Productions, Sony Interactive Entertainment) — Brad Meyer, Josh Lord, Adam Lidbetter; Lumines Arise (Enhance Games, Monstars) — Takako Ishida, Noboru Mutoh; Split Fiction (Hazelight Studios, Electronic Arts) — Philip Eriksson	**Outstanding Achievement in Story**: **Clair Obscur: Expedition 33 (Sandfall Interactive, Kepler Interactive) — Jennifer Svedberg-Yen, Guillame Broche**‡; Consume Me (Hexecutable LLC) — Jenny Jiao Hsia, AP Thomson; Despelote (Panic Inc.) — Julián Cordero, Sebastián Valbuena, Gabe Cuzzillo; South of Midnight (Compulsion Games, Xbox Game Studios) — Zaire Lanier, Dani Dee, Farah Brixi; The Drifter (Powerhoof) — Dave Lloyd
**Outstanding Technical Achievement**: **Death Stranding 2: On the Beach (Kojima Productions, Sony Interactive Entertainment) — Hideo Kojima, Akio Sakamoto, Megan Tuckwell**‡; ARC Raiders (Embark Studios) — Robert Träffe, Martin Singh-Blom; Assassin's Creed Shadows (Ubisoft Québec) — Claude Langlais, Pierre Fortin, Karl Onnée, Thierry Dansereau; Donkey Kong Bananza (Nintendo EPD) — Kenta Motokura, Kazuya Takahashi, Daisuke Watanabe, Wataru Tanaka; Doom: The Dark Ages (id Software, Bethesda Softworks) — Billy Khan, Bogdan Coroi, Evan Eubanks, Tiago Sousa

=== Genre awards ===
**Action Game of the Year**: **Hades II (Supergiant Games) — Greg Kasavin, Amir Rao, Gavin Simon, Darren Korb, Jen Zee, Andrew Wang**‡; Absolum (Guard Crush Games, Supamonks, Dotemu) — Micke Moïsa, Jordi Asensio, Cyrille Lagarigue, Maxime Mary; ARC Raiders (Embark Studios) — Aleksander Grøndal, Stefan Strandberg, Virgil Watkins; Doom: The Dark Ages (id Software, Bethesda Softworks) — Marty Stratton, Hugo Martin; Ninja Gaiden 4 (Team Ninja, PlatinumGames, Xbox Game Studios) — Yuji Nakao, Fumihiko Yasuda, Masakazu Hirayama	**Adventure Game of the Year**: **Ghost of Yōtei (Sucker Punch Productions, Sony Interactive Entertainment) — Brian Fleming, Jason Connell, Nate Fox**‡; Blue Prince (Dogubomb, Raw Fury) — Tonda Ros; Dispatch (AdHoc Studio) — Nick Herman, Dennis Lenart, Pierre Shorette, Natalie Herman; Donkey Kong Bananza (Nintendo EPD) — Kenta Motokura, Kazuya Takahashi, Wataru Tanaka; Hollow Knight: Silksong (Team Cherry) — Ari Gibson, William Pellen, Jasmine Vine, Christopher Larkin
**Family Game of the Year**: **Lego Party (SMG Studio, Fictions) — Ashley Ringrose, Mark Fennell, James Milenkovic**‡; Lego Voyagers (Light Brick Studio, Annapurna Interactive) — Karsten Lund, Mads Prahm; Lumines Arise (Enhance Games, Monstars) — Takashi Ishihara, Tetsuya Mizuguchi, Mark MacDonald, Julian Chunovic; Marvel Cosmic Invasion (Tribute Games, Dotemu) — Frederic Gemus, Remi Lavoie; Popucom (Countersurge Salient, Gryphline) — Shawn Pan, Sai Li, Louise Chen	**Fighting Game of the Year**: **Mortal Kombat: Legacy Kollection (Digital Eclipse, Atari) — Mike Mika, Steven Johnson**‡; 2XKO (Riot Games) — Tom Cannon, Tony Cannon, Shaun Rivera; Capcom Fighting Collection 2 (Capcom) — Shuhei Matsumoto; Fatal Fury: City of the Wolves (SNK) — Hayato Konya, Yasuyuki Oda; WWE 2K25 (Visual Concepts, 2K Games) — Lynell Jinks, Alan Flores, Colin O'Hara
**Racing Game of the Year**: **Mario Kart World (Nintendo EPD) — Kosuke Yabuki, Shintaro Jikumaru, Kosuke Yabuki**‡; F1 25 (Codemasters, Electronic Arts) — Lee Mather, Gavin Cooper, Andrew Watt, Chris Gray, David Williams, Gareth Lewis, Hugh Pearson, Nic Madden, Si Lumb; Kirby Air Riders (Sora Ltd., Nintendo) — Masahiro Sakurai, Shinya Saito, Makoto Okazaki; Wheel World (Messhof, Annapurna Interactive) — Mark Essen, Kristy Norindr	**Role-Playing Game of the Year**: **Clair Obscur: Expedition 33 (Sandfall Interactive, Kepler Interactive) — Guillaume Broche, Tom Guillermin, François Meurisse**‡; Citizen Sleeper 2: Starward Vector (Jump Over the Age, Fellow Traveller Games) — Gareth Damian Martin, Amos Roddy, Guillaume Singelin; Kingdom Come: Deliverance II (Warhorse Studios, Deep Silver) — Daniel Vávra, Martin Klima; Monster Hunter Wilds (Capcom) — Kaname Fujioka, Yuya Tokuda, Ryozo Tsujimoto; The Outer Worlds 2 (Obsidian Entertainment, Xbox Game Studios) — Leonard Boyarsky, Brandon Adler, Justin Britch
**Sports Game of the Year**: **Rematch (Sloclap, Kepler Interactive) — Pierre Tamo, Edward Sananikone**‡; EA Sports FC 26 (EA Vancouver, EA Romania, EA Sports) — John Shepherd, Adam Shaikh, Karim Versi; PGA Tour 2K25 (HB Studios, 2K Games) — Peter Jones, Joe Stewart, Ken Alguire, Joel Thompson, David McFarland; MLB The Show 25 (SIE San Diego Studio) — Chris Cutliff, Jason Villa, Aaron Luke; NBA 2K26 (Visual Concepts, 2K Games) — Mike Wang, Greg Thomas, Erick Boenisch	**Strategy/Simulation Game of the Year**: **The Alters (11 Bit Studios) — Tomasz Kisilewicz, Szymon Kurek, Jakub Karolczak, Stanislav Mishchenko**‡; Drop Duchy (Sleepy Mill Studio, The Arcade Crew) — Jean-Baptiste Oger; Europa Universalis V (Paradox Tinto) — Johan Andersson; The King Is Watching (Hypnohead, tinyBuild) — Semen Itmanyuk, Vladimir Tolmachev; StarVaders (Pengonauts, Joystick Ventures) — Eddie Cai, Hansen Liu

=== Special awards ===
Hall of Fame

- Evan Wells

=== Multiple nominations and awards ===
==== Multiple nominations ====
Games that received multiple nominations
Nominations	Game
8	Clair Obscur: Expedition 33
8	Ghost of Yōtei
6	ARC Raiders
6	Dispatch
5	Blue Prince
4	Death Stranding 2: On the Beach
3	Hades II
3	Kingdom Come: Deliverance II
3	Mario Kart World
3	The Midnight Walk
2	Consume Me
2	Despelote
2	Donkey Kong Bananza
2	Doom: The Dark Ages
2	Ghost Town
2	Lumines Arise
2	Marvel's Deadpool VR
2	Monster Hunter Wilds
2	South of Midnight
2	Split Fiction

Nominations by company
Nominations	Games	Company
13	3	Sony Interactive Entertainment
9	2	Kepler Interactive
8	1	Sandfall Interactive
8	1	Sucker Punch Productions
6	3	Nintendo
6	1	AdHoc Studio
6	1	Embark Studios
5	4	Electronic Arts
5	1	Dogubomb
5	1	Raw Fury
4	3	Xbox Game Studios
4	1	Kojima Productions
3	3	2K Games
3	2	Capcom
3	2	Panic Inc.
3	1	Deep Silver
3	1	Fast Travel Games
3	1	MoonHood
3	1	Supergiant Games
3	1	Warhorse Studios
2	2	Dotemu
2	2	NetEase Games
2	1	Bethesda Softworks
2	1	Compulsion Games
2	1	Enhance Games
2	1	Fireproof Games
2	1	Hazelight Studios
2	1	Hexecutable
2	1	id Software
2	1	Monstars
2	1	Oculus Studios
2	1	Twisted Pixel Games

==== Multiple awards ====
Games that received multiple awards
Awards	Game
5	Clair Obscur: Expedition 33
3	Ghost of Yōtei
2	Blue Prince
2	Death Stranding 2: On The Beach

Awards by company
Awards	Games	Company
6	2	Kepler Interactive
5	2	Sony Interactive Entertainment
5	1	Sandfall Interactive
3	1	Sucker Punch Productions
2	1	Dogubomb
2	1	Kojima Productions
2	1	Raw Fury
