= Naked Josh =

Canadian comedy television series

- Genre: Comedy
- Created by: Alex Epstein; Laura Kosterski
- Starring: David Julian Hirsh; Andrew Tarbet; Sarah Smyth; Patricia McKenzie
- Country of origin: Canada
- No. of seasons: 3
- No. of episodes: 26

Production
- Running time: 30 minutes

Original release
- Network: Showcase
- Release: June 15, 2004 – July 18, 2006

Naked Josh is a Canadian comedy television series, which aired on Showcase from 2004 to 2006. It was created and written by Alex Epstein and Laura Kosterski. The show starred David Julian Hirsh as Josh Gould, a university professor in Montreal who, although he teaches a sexual anthropology course, struggles to understand the ever-shifting rules and expectations of the dating scene.

It premiered in the 2004–2005 television season with eight half-hour episodes, and aired for a total of three seasons. The show's first season briefly aired on the Oxygen Network in the United States.

The series received a Gemini Award nomination for Best Comedy Series at the 21st Gemini Awards in 2006.

== Cast and characters ==
- David Julian Hirsh as Josh Gould
- Sarah Smyth as Natalie Bouchard
- Patricia McKenzie as Jennifer Chopra
- James A. Woods as Steve
- Susan Glover as Sarah
- Andrew Tarbet as Eric Kosciusko
- Ruth Chiang as Claudia
- Lucinda Davis as Angela

== Directors ==
- James Allodi
- Paul Carrière
- Jim Donovan
- Tim Southam

== Writers ==
- Alex Epstein, co-creator and writer
- Laura Kosterski, co-creator and writer
- Matt MacLennan
- Robert David Sheridan
- Henri-Leon Solomon
- Karen Hill

== Episodes ==
=== Season 1 (2004) ===
No. overall	No. in season	Title	Directed by	Written by	Original release date
1	1	"The Sexual Contract"	Paul Carriere	Alex Epstein & Laura Kosterski	June 15, 2004
2	2	"Game, Setup, Match"	Unknown	Unknown	June 22, 2004
3	3	"Flirting With Disaster"	Unknown	Unknown	June 29, 2004
4	4	"Celibacy"	Unknown	Unknown	July 6, 2004
5	5	"Domme & Dommer"	Unknown	Unknown	July 13, 2004
6	6	"Do Not Resuscitate"	Paul Carriere	Alex Epstein	July 20, 2004
7	7	"The More the Merrier"	Unknown	Unknown	July 27, 2004
8	8	"Fun for the Whole Family"	Unknown	Unknown	August 3, 2004

=== Season 2 (2005) ===
No. overall	No. in season	Title	Directed by	Written by	Original release date
9	1	"Baring It All"	Unknown	Unknown	June 22, 2005
10	2	"Damsel"	Unknown	Unknown	June 29, 2005
11	3	"The Artist and the Professor"	Unknown	Unknown	July 6, 2005
12	4	"The Loneliness Long Distance"	Unknown	Unknown	July 13, 2005
13	5	"The Thrill of the Chase"	Unknown	Unknown	July 20, 2005
14	6	"Fake It Till You Make It"	Unknown	Unknown	July 27, 2005
15	7	"Making It Work"	Unknown	Unknown	August 3, 2005
16	8	"What's the Rush?"	Unknown	Unknown	August 10, 2005

=== Season 3 ===
No. overall	No. in season	Title	Directed by	Written by	Original release date
17	1	"Man on the Ledge"	TBA	TBA	TBA
18	2	"Who's Your Daddy?"	TBA	TBA	TBA
19	3	"Just Say Mo"	TBA	TBA	TBA
20	4	"Looking Good"	TBA	TBA	TBA
21	5	"Name Your Price"	TBA	TBA	TBA
22	6	"Pistols at Dawn"	TBA	TBA	TBA
23	7	"Virgin Territory"	TBA	TBA	TBA
24	8	"Planned Parenthood"	TBA	TBA	TBA
25	9	"Footprints"	TBA	TBA	TBA
26	10	"Beating the Rap"	TBA	TBA	TBA
