= Stories: The Path of Destinies =

2016 video game

- Developer: Spearhead Games
- Publisher: Spearhead Games
- Director: Malik Boukira
- Producer: Atul Nath Mehra
- Artist: Yan Mongrain
- Writers: Alex Epstein; Nadim Boukhira
- Composer: Vibe Avenue
- Engine: Unreal Engine 4
- Platforms: Windows; PlayStation 4; Xbox One
- Release: Windows, PlayStation 4 April 12, 2016; Xbox One; March 22, 2019
- Genre: Action role-playing
- Mode: Single-player

Stories: The Path of Destinies is an action role-playing game developed by Spearhead Games. It was released for Microsoft Windows and PlayStation 4 on April 12, 2016, and for the Xbox One on March 22, 2019.

The player controls an anthropomorphic fox named Reynardo that is part of a resistance force fighting against an oppressive Emperor. The player controls Reynardo from a third-person perspective, using a combination of attack combos to defeat foes, gain experience to unlock new combat skills, and craft new weapons that unlock parts of levels. During his escapades, Reynardo comes across a magic book that lets him see potential choices and their results, and subsequently go back and make different choices; however, Reynardo retains all the experience and upgrades earned up to that point, thus able to proceed along different paths at these points. The goal is to seek the best-possible ending out of the twenty-four that are set in the game.

Spearhead Games' following title, Omensight, is set in the same world and features a similar premise as Stories: The Path of Destinies.

== Gameplay ==
Stories is an action role-playing game. The player can move Reynardo across the landscape, using a grappling hook to help cross open spaces between floating islands. At times, the player will encounter enemies and Reynardo must fight them before the player can proceed. The player starts with a number of basic attacks and blocks they can use, but as Reynardo gains skills, earned by gaining experience points from combat, more advanced combat techniques become available. Should Reynardo lose his health during these fights, the character will be respawned at a recent checkpoint and will have to start the combat over again.

Skills can be gained once Reynardo has gained enough points at various altars across the landscape. Treasure chests hold material items that can be used to craft or improve one of several sword types at a workbench. These swords can be used in combat for more potent effects, but also are required to unlock certain doors that are present on the level.

Within a level, the player may find an option to complete it to one of multiple endpoints, or may find only a single endpoint. Here, the game will then present the player, through narration, with two or three options they can take the story, which will determine which level the player will next start; in a few cases, a choice will lead to an immediate conclusion of the story often in the capture or death of Reynardo. There are generally four or five of these choices before the player reaches a final level and the conclusion of the story at that point. At this point, the player is then shown the magic book picked up by Reynardo at the start of the story, and how that ending fits into the overall picture. In this meta-game, there are four "truths" in relation to the game's narrative that will remain fixed regardless of the decisions the player takes, and the player's goal is make the right selections to discover each of these four truths.

When the player repeats the game to discover these truths, Reynardo will retain all upgrades he has earned. This can enable access to areas on some levels that were currently blocked without having the correct sword. When the player comes to decision points, they will be shown which decisions have already been made in a previous playthrough, so they can explore other options. Information from the narrative can be used to determine which decisions are better options; for example, one path may reveal an ally to actually be a mole for the enemy, so by avoiding choices with that character will likely lead to one of the truths. Once the four truths are discovered, the player can use their newfound knowledge to find the only victorious path, thus winning the game, though they may go back to explore the other possible endings.

== Plot ==
"Stories" takes place in a world of anthropomorphic animal characters in a steampunk-themed world on islands floating in air.

The protagonist is Reynardo, a fox corsair who reluctantly had retired from his adventures because of his mother's dying wish. One day his hometown is attacked by evil musclebound ravens sent by the Empire led by Isengrim III, once a humble and shy toad and a scholar but now has started a vicious campaign to find ancient artifacts and forgotten magic to gain access to the banished "elder gods" who once nearly destroyed the world.

Reynardo is the only survivor to escape the town on his fast airship with a mysterious book. As Reynardo reads the book, he joins with a Rebellion against the mad Emperor as a freelance vanguard and the last line of defense against the Empire's mighty imperial armada.

Reynardo finds out that the book is magic and provides him a narrative guidance as he makes choices along the story that provides a path that ends with a result that may or may not be to his benefits. The book is not showing Reynardo a future set in stone, but a possibility of what could transpire, despite him directly living it. For example; during his many choices, he learns that his best friend Lapino who is a cowardly, goofy rabbit spy working for the Rebellion, turns out to be a traitor working for the empire.

However, Reynardo discovers that a feline woman he knew during youth and is still in love with named Zenobia, who is Emperor Isengrim III's adopted daughter as well as his best general, has feelings for him as well even though she is conflicted by her loyalty to her adopted father. Reynardo tries many paths and choices, like using ancient demonic artifacts that possesses him to kill as many as possible no matter friend or foe, old magical technology that turns out to be extremely unstable that it can destroy the universe and using his loyal friends one way or another but they all ends the same: Reynardo dies or the world is destroyed at the end and is thrust back to the beginning of the book.

Eventually, Reynardo wises up and uses his knowledge of his past experiences via the book to win this time. He tricks Lapino into fetching the evil artifact that can corrupt him and kill the emperor which would force him to use the same unstable magical weapon that can destroy the empire. Reynardo also regains the trust of Zenobia by telling her that the Emperor plans to kill her as a sacrifice to the old gods. However, Reynardo's plans fails as he discovers that Zenobia knocked out Lapino, grabbed the artifact which corrupts her and has killed everyone in the Rebellion headquarters. But Reynardo manages to free her by finally admitting his love for her thus destroying the artifact because it was weak against true love.

Reynardo and Zenobia decide to run away but they are quickly followed by the empire fleet led by the emperor himself who is using the highly unstable magical weapon as a cannon, which fires a beam towards Reynardo's airship. Then it is shown that Reynardo and Zenobia are alone on his airship and no one else is around them and they continue their flight towards the island of Avellone. It isn't cleared out if the Emperor and his fleet were destroyed by the use of the weapon (so Reynardo and Zenobia are headed towards the real island of Avellone), or the beam destroyed Reynardo's airship and killed him and Zenobia, maybe with the Emperor and his fleet (so Reynardo and Zenobia would be headed towards an island of Avellone, meaning a place of rest in the afterlife).

== Reception ==
Reception

Aggregate score
Aggregator	Score
Metacritic	73/100

Review score
Publication	Score
Game Informer	7.75/10

Stories: The Path of Destinies received mixed to positive reviews on release. The concept of the game, which combined the nature of action role-playing games with the allure of Choose Your Own Adventure books, was seen initially as a positive, and the gameplay was considered a cross between Bastion and Star Fox. However, critics found that the game's combat system, though considered very fluid similar to the Batman: Arkham Asylum game, to be repetitive with little variation in the types of enemies or the range of moves that Reynardo could complete. Further, because the player must play through the game several times to get the right ending, critics further highlighted the limited range of combat options, making the overall title seem dull.

Stories was named Best PC Game and Best Indie Game at the 2016 Canadian Videogame Awards.

== Sequel ==
A sequel, titled Ever After Again: A Stories Adventure, was announced in August 2026. It is set for release on Windows, PlayStation 5, and Xbox Series X/S.
