= Ary and the Secret of Seasons =

2020 video game

- Developers: Exiin, Fishing Cactus
- Publishers: Modus Games, Maximum Games
- Director: Sebastien Le Touze
- Producer: Bruce Hayles
- Writer: Genese Davis
- Composer: Marcus Hedges
- Engine: Unity
- Platforms: Microsoft Windows, Xbox One, PlayStation 4, Nintendo Switch, Stadia
- Release: Windows, Xbox One, PlayStation 4, Nintendo Switch; September 1, 2020; Stadia; November 5, 2020
- Genre: Action-adventure
- Mode: Single-player

Ary and the Secret of Seasons is an action-adventure game developed by Belgian indie studio Exiin, ported on consoles by Fishing Cactus and published by Modus Games. The game was released on Microsoft Windows via Steam, and Xbox One, PlayStation 4 and Nintendo Switch on September 1, 2020, and Stadia on November 5, 2020.

== Gameplay ==
Ary and the Secret of Seasons is a 3D action adventure platformer. The game is structured similar to The Legend of Zelda, with progress limited to certain areas of the game world until the player has collected a new weapon or ability for Ary to use.

== Plot ==
Ary and the Secret of Seasons follows the journey of a young girl named Aryelle, or Ary for short, across the magnificent world of Valdi. Ary has joined the Guardians of Seasons, an old organization traditionally ruled by men.

The game takes place in the world of Valdi, a world where each region is divided based on the four seasons. 1,000 years ago, an Evil Mage attempted to take over the world, but was stopped by the Legendary Warrior. In the current day, Ary is the daughter of the winter guardian, Gwenn. Ary's older brother, Flynn, was the winter guardian apprentice, but disappeared sometime ago while with the spring guardian apprentice, Prince Crocus.

One day, gigantic red crystals crash from sky, changing the regional seasons into their opposite and sending the world into turmoil. The guardians are summoned to the Dome of Seasons to investigate the crisis. Ary decides to set out and take her brother's place, as her father is still grieving Flynn's disappearance. She disguises herself as a boy and take her father's orb of winter. With it, she can turn her surroundings to ice and snow.

She travels from her village to the guardian's temple, known as the Dome of Seasons, where the other 3 guardians are discussing the crisis. She finds they have been knocked out by a masked assailant, who stole the fall and spring orbs. Ary recovers the summer guardian's orbs, and also encounters Prince Crocus, who is shown to be a friend and ally to Ary and her family. Crocus invites Ary to the royal capital, Ostara, to discuss the weather crisis.

Soon after arriving, Crocus knocks out Ary and reveals he stole the guardian's seasons crystals. Crocus believes he needs all the orbs to become the Legendary Warrior and defeat the Evil Mage once and for all. He imprisons Ary in the castle dungeon. She escapes with the help of Muscari, but is too late to stop Crocus from unleashing the Evil Mage. Crocus sees something and becomes frightened and runs away, while the Evil Mage escapes to restart their conquest.

The guardians task Ary with collecting 4 light cores from each of the 4 season temples. Each light core is protected by a golem. Ary needs to use the cores to power up a weapon called the Cartographer which can stop the Evil Mage. Ary visits each temple and retrieves the cores from each temple guardian. Along the way, she also encounters a masked armored figure that she believes is the Legendary Warrior. After visiting each temple, Ary takes the cores to the Cartographer location where Crocus confronts her. He tells her the Evil Mage has been manipulating her and the Cartographer is not a weapon, but she does not trust him because of his previous actions. The Evil Mage appears and taunts Ary, prompting her to power up the Cartographer. The mage steals it the light orbs, revealing they actually allow time travel using the Cartographer. The Evil Mage reveals he created the light orbs and they also power up agigantic golem that the Evil Mage plans on using to conquer the world.

Ary defeats the golem and enters it to confront the Evil Mage. She finds the Legendary Warrior already defeating the Evil Mage, to bring the mage back to the time vault. Crocus unmasks the mage, showing an older Crocus underneath, revealing that everything is due to some sort of time paradox.

Crocus allows himself to be imprisoned before he can become the Evil Mage. The Evil Mage escapes and reveals to Ary that her brother Flynn is still alive but not in the current time period. The Legendary Warrior sends Ary back home, and unmasks in secret, revealing herself to be the future Ary. Ary returns home and resolves to find Flynn.

== Development ==
Ary and the Secret of Seasons was originally developed Sébastien Le Touze. Le Touze founded game studio Exiin in 2015 and had been developing mobile games for about two years. In 2017, the production of Ary and the Secret of Seasons started and was first shown at Gamescom, winning the Best Unity Game award 2017. In August 2018, the publisher Modus Games announced at Gamescom 2018 publishing the game Ary and the Secret of Seasons. The team behind Ary and the Secret of Seasons is a small, between 5 and 10 people are working full-time on the game and even the producer Bruce Hayles from Modus Games helped in development and lift up the team.

The fictional world of Valdi is multicultural and diverse. It is influenced by Asian influences and elements from the developer's own country. Le Touze says that one structure in the game, called The Dome of Seasons, is based on Saint Mary's Royal Church in Brussels. In addition to the developer's real-life surroundings, other inspirations include early PlayStation and PlayStation 2 games, like Legacy of Kain: Soul Reaver and Jak and Daxter.

At E3 2019's Modus Games booth, the game was presented. It was featured during Microsoft's presentation ID@Xbox 2020 Summer Spotlight Series.

Originally planned to be released July 28, 2020. The game was delayed to September 1, 2020, due to the COVID-19 pandemic, in an interview with Techraptor and Nintendo Life.

Video game composer, Marcus Hedges, composed the music for Ary and the Secret of Seasons. The soundtrack was released by Materia Collective on August 18, 2020. Video game lead writer Genese Davis wrote the plot for Ary and the Secret of Seasons.

Ary and the Secret of Seasons was nominated at Gamescom#2020 in the category "Best Family Game" along with Crash Bandicoot 4: It's About Time and KeyWe.

== Reception ==
Reception

Aggregate scores
| Aggregator | Score |
|---|---|
| Metacritic | PC: 59/100; PS4: 56/100; XONE: 57/100; NS: 58/100 |
| OpenCritic | 19% recommend |

Review scores
| Publication | Score |
|---|---|
| Nintendo Life | 6/10 |
| Nintendo World Report | 5.5/10 |
| Push Square | 7/10 |

Ary and the Secret Seasons received "mixed or average" reviews, according to review aggregator website Metacritic. Fellow review aggregator OpenCritic assessed that the game received weak approval, being recommended by 19% of critics.
