= Omensight =

2018 video game

- PlayStation 4 digital artwork
- Developer: Spearhead Games
- Publisher: Spearhead Games
- Writers: Nadim Boukhira; Genese Davis; Chris Avellone
- Composer: Vibe Avenue
- Engine: Unreal Engine 4
- Platforms: PlayStation 4; Microsoft Windows; Nintendo Switch; Xbox One
- Release: PlayStation 4, Microsoft Windows; May 15, 2018; Nintendo Switch; December 13, 2018; Xbox One; June 7, 2019
- Genre: Action role-playing
- Mode: Single-player

Omensight is an action role-playing game developed and published by Canadian studio Spearhead Games. It is a spiritual successor to Stories: The Path of Destinies and is set in the same universe. It was released for Microsoft Windows and PlayStation 4 on May 15, 2018, the Nintendo Switch on December 13, 2018, and the Xbox One on June 7, 2019.

== Story ==
Set in within the same world as Stories: The Path of Destinies, the game centers around the player's role as the Harbinger, a mythical warrior who only appears in times of great crisis. The game's world, Urralia, has been destroyed by the dark god Voden after the death of the priestess Vera. The player is called to use the Omensight power to travel back in time and relive the day of Vera's murder again and again until the murder can be solved and prevented while using the Tree of Life as a hub. Preventing the murder prevents the end of the world. Over the course of the game, the Harbinger comes in contact with four other companion characters who are the key to solving the crisis. These are Ludomir, an alcoholic but a powerful Rodentian freedom fighter and Vera's step brother, Draga, the studious and honorable general of the Pygarian Army, Ratika, a cool and sardonic magical bard and leader of the Rodentian Forces, and Indrik, the ruthless and impatient Emperor of Pygaria.

On her quest to save the world, not hesitating to kill any of her allies if they get in the way, the Harbinger discovers that Vera betrayed her calling to summon Voden, falsely believing she could control it, to end the war Indrik started in his own misguided attempt to stop the apocalypse, with Ratika catching wind of her transgression and attempting but failing to kill her, with Vera's associates who worship Voden killing her once she served her purpose. The Harbinger gains enough knowledge to confront and defeat Voden, but Indrik, Draga and Ludomir die and Ratika becomes an entity called the deathless and rules the world as a god.

After learning every secret regarding her allies and the case, the Harbinger's grid sends her to the day before Vera's murder. With the help of all her allies and Vera, the Harbinger permanently imprisons Voden. Afterwards, Vera and Ludomir set out to end Voden's cult while Indrik, Draga and Ratika relinquish their respective positions, Indrik becomes an entomologist, Draga becomes a combat teacher with her own academy, and Ratika aids Rodentia's rebuilding before mysteriously vanishing, never to be seen again. Finally the Harbinger returns to the Tree of Life until she is needed again.

== Gameplay ==
The game is described as an action murder mystery. However, according to one review, "[a]t its core Omensight is an action RPG." There is a mystery to be solved, but it is solved by playing through the game and not by the player puzzling through the evidence and the facts. In essence, the mystery is the driving story, and the gameplay itself is centered around the combat.

The combat itself is straightforward, based around four abilities: a light attack, heavy attack, a dodge, and a jump. The player also gains special abilities and can use the special ability of the companion character accompanying them. Combat is fast-paced and powerful because of a targeting mechanic that points the player toward the next enemy in the vicinity. The Omensight official website describes it as "fluid, stylish combat that combines swordplay and magical abilities."

== Reception ==
Omensight received "generally positive" and "mixed or average" reviews according to review aggregator Metacritic.

Reception

Aggregate score
Aggregator	Score
Metacritic	(PC) 75/100 (PS4) 74/100 (XONE) 81/100

Review scores
Publication	Score
Destructoid	7.5/10
GamesRadar+	4/5
Nintendo World Report	8.5/10
Push Square	7/10

Gamesradar called the game "A time travel tale that manages to be comprehensible and intricate". Destructoid called it "a fun fantasy romp starring fuzzy animal things".
