= The Drifter (video game) =

2025 video game

- Developer: Powerhoof
- Publisher: Powerhoof
- Director: Dave Lloyd
- Producer: Dave Lloyd
- Designer: Dave Lloyd
- Programmer: Dave Lloyd
- Artist: Barney Cumming
- Writer: Dave Lloyd
- Composers: Mitchell Pasmans; Louis Meyer
- Engine: Unity
- Platforms: Microsoft Windows; macOS; Linux; Nintendo Switch; Nintendo Switch 2
- Release: July 17, 2025; Switch, Switch 2; June 22, 2026
- Genre: Point-and-click adventure
- Mode: Single-player

The Drifter is a pulp point-and-click adventure game developed and published by Australian developer Powerhoof for Windows, macOS, and Linux. It was released on July 17, 2025 for PC, with Nintendo Switch and Nintendo Switch 2 following on June 22, 2026.

== Gameplay ==
The Drifter is a 2D pixel art point-and-click adventure game. Players control Mick Carter as he navigates various environments, interacts with characters, and solves puzzles using a minimal inventory system. The game uses contextual interactions and dialogue options that evolve based on the player's discoveries. One mechanic involves the protagonist experiencing death and reliving moments leading up to it, adding a layer of time-loop logic to certain sequences. The overall pacing is faster than traditional adventure games, with a compact design that emphasizes story and momentum over exploration or backtracking.

== Plot ==
Five years ago Mick Carter abandoned his wife Sarah in the hospital while their son Alec was dying from Batten disease and became a drifter. When his mother dies, he returns to his hometown for her funeral after being asked by his psychologist sister Annie.

When he arrives home, he is attacked by mysterious assailants. Mick is able to flee and encounters reporter Angela Grace who tells him she is investigating mysterious cases of homeless people disappearing and others going crazy.

Mick sees her being abducted by the same assailants. He is knocked out and awakes when he is thrown into the water with a weight attached to his feet. Mick drowns but immediately comes back to life at the moment he is thrown into the water. Using the knowledge he gained during his first drowning, he is able to free himself.

Eventually Mick is able to attend his mother's funeral, where he is threatend by a man with a gun. Annie knocks the man out and Mick flees again, hiding in one of the below-ground crypts in the cemetery, where he sees visions of Alec. In the crypt, a mysterious three-eyed creature, called "Mulinji" by some of the other homeless people, stalks Mick. He is able to make the crypt cave in and bury the monster, but gets buried under some earth himself.

He wakes up in a hospital where the man with the gun identifies himself as police officer Hara. When a nurse and another police officer knock out Hara and try to kill Mick, Mick fights them off. Hara frees him. Sarah tells them that Annie also seems to have been abducted by the conspirators. The three search for clues about the conspiracy. They encounter medical company Trinity Biotech, founded by three people, two of them being Gideon Roth and Maxwell Holden.

They also find a secret location for what appears to be one of Trinity's laboratories. When Mick enters it, he is captured by Maxwell Holden, who explains that the company had been researching time travel by winding back time during death experiences, that some people have a talent for these phenomena, like Mick does, that the experiences lead to hallucinations and violent insanity if repeated too often and that Roth had experimented with rewinding time longer and longer, leading to ever riskier experiments. Holden had cut ties with Dr. Roth and this location is in fact a crude rogue laboratoy of Holden's. Holden wants to operate on Mick's brain to remove his ability to move through time, explaining that it is needed to preserve Mick's sanity and that he had done the same on his own brain.

Mick is able to free himself and to convince Holden to come with him and Hara to the actual Infinity laboratory to stop Roth's experiments. They find the lab in a former secret nuclear power research site in the desert. During their break-in Holden is killed. Inside hey are welcomed by Roth, Annie and Angela. They explain that there was a misunderstanding and that Roth is only trying to help humanity, that Mick had already been here before and had volunteered to be a test subject but that the preparation for the experiment had wiped some of his memory.

Not convinced, Mick and Hara try to find proof that Roth has nefarious motives. They find out that Sophia Roth, Gideon's wife, was the third founder of Infinity and cheated on him with Holden. Roth tries to go back to the past many years to kill Holden before he and Sophia will meet. Mick had volunteered to become a test subject because he wanted to go back far enough in time before Alec was born to prevent his birth and spare himself the horror of seeing his son die. Mick changes his mind and dupes Gideon into removing the time rewind ability from himself and Mick. An enraged Gideon tries to blow up the lab. Mick, Hara, Annie and Angela escape but Sarah is shot while she arrives to rescue them.

The epilogue shows that Mick has not abandoned Sarah in the hospital this time while she recuperates from the gunshot wound.

== Development ==
The Drifter was developed by Powerhoof, an independent Australian studio best known for its pixel-art games. The project was primarily led by Dave Lloyd and Barney Cumming, who handled writing, design, programming and art, respectively. Initially conceived as a short game jam prototype, The Drifter evolved into a full-length title over several years of part-time development. The team aimed to create a streamlined adventure experience that maintained the storytelling depth of classic point-and-click games while reducing player friction through modern design choices. The game features fully voiced dialogue and a dark, cinematic soundtrack, with visual influences drawn from 1980s thrillers and sci-fi. It was built using PowerQuest, a Unity tool, developed by Lloyd specifically for creating 2D point and click adventure games, and translated into German by Marcel Weyers for the launch in July 2025.

On January 13, 2026, the game received an update adding French, Italian, and Spanish localizations, along with support for fan translations, quality-of-life improvements, numerous bug fixes, text corrections, and behind-the-scenes optimizations. The additional localization work was handled by the localization collective Warlocs. Concha Fernández served as the Spanish translator, Christophe Pallarès translated the French version, and the Italian localization was completed by Carlo De Rensis, Juny Gentile, and Stefano Rossitto. Marcel Weyers returned as localization manager for the project.

== Reception ==
Reception

Aggregate scores
Aggregator	Score
Metacritic	(PC) 84/100 (NS2) 89/100
OpenCritic	94% recommend

Review scores
Publication	Score
4Players	8.0/10
Eurogamer	5/5
PC Gamer (UK)	70/100
The Games Machine (Italy)	8.7/10

The Drifter received "generally favorable reviews" by critics according to review aggregator platform Metacritic.

Brodie Gibbons from Press Start Australia described The Drifter as "a thriller from start to finish," praising its relentless pacing and gripping narrative delivery.

4Players praised The Drifter as a gritty, high-intensity thriller with strong atmosphere, sharp writing, and compelling pacing that sets it apart from more traditional point-and-click games. The review highlighted its "hidden gem" quality but also noted minor drawbacks, including some puzzles that are too easy and the limited Michael Crichton influence.

Alexander Bohn-Elias from Eurogamer Germany gave 5 out of 5 stars, and described the game as "the best point-and-click adventure [he has] ever played". He also praised the strong characters, fantastic voice actors, and German subtitles.

=== Awards ===
Year	Award	Category	Result	Ref.
2025	Australian Game Developer Awards	Game of the Year	Won	
2025	Australian Game Developer Awards	Excellence in Visual Art	Won	
2025	Australian Game Developer Awards	Excellence in Narrative	Won	
2025	Australian Game Developer Awards	Excellence in Sound Design	Won	
2025	Australian Game Developer Awards	Excellence in Gameplay	Nominated	
2025	Australian Game Developer Awards	Excellence in Music	Nominated	
2026	29th Annual D.I.C.E. Awards	Outstanding Achievement in Story	Nominated	

== Film adaptation ==
In September 2026, Sony Pictures and Story Kitchen acquired rights to produce a film adaptation with Dmitri M. Johnson and Michael Lawrence Goldberg producing and Timothy I. Stevenson and Elena Sandoval as executive producers.
