= The Midnight Walk =

2025 video game

- Developer: MoonHood
- Publisher: Fast Travel Games
- Directors: Klaus Lyngeled; Olov Redmalm
- Producer: Dominic Kendrick
- Designer: Martin Blomkvist
- Programmer: Ola Sivefäldt
- Artist: Victor Becker
- Writer: Olov Redmalm
- Composer: Joel Bille
- Engine: Unreal Engine 5
- Platforms: PlayStation 5 Windows; Nintendo Switch 2
- Release: PlayStation 5, Windows; May 8, 2025; Nintendo Switch 2 March 26, 2026
- Genre: Adventure
- Mode: Single-player

The Midnight Walk is an adventure video game developed by MoonHood and published by Fast Travel Games. It was released on PlayStation 5 and Windows on May 8, 2025, with support for virtual reality devices. The game is split into five major chapters, with each telling a self-contained story revolving around the overarching themes of fire and darkness.

The Midnight Walk received positive reviews from critics.

== Gameplay ==
The Midnight Walk is a first-person adventure video game. The game is set in a world completely engulfed by darkness. The player character is known as "the Burnt One", who befriends a creature called "Potboy" and helps protect him from monsters eager to consume his flame. While the main goal of the game is to escort Potboy to the summit of Moon Mountain, the game is split into six major chapters, with each telling a self-contained story revolving around the overarching themes of fire and darkness.

It is a linear game which is playable on both standard screens and virtual reality devices. The game does not have a combat system. The player needs to use Potboy's flame and matches collected in the game's world to burn candles, illuminating the areas around them. Dangerous monsters will avoid brightly lit areas, allowing the two characters to progress. Eventually, the player will acquire a matchlock, allowing them to shoot matches and light candles from afar. A key mechanic to solve puzzles in the game involves the player character closing their eyes and listening for audio cues which will direct the players to their objectives. This blinking mechanic can also reveal secrets of the game's world, remove obstacles, and stop hostile attacks.

== Synopsis ==
In a world made entirely of arts and crafts, the once peaceful landscape has been submerged in eternal darkness ever since the sun has died out, resulting in nightmarish creatures to crawl from the shadows and caused the inhabitants to commit horrendous acts due to their desperate need for fire. Eventually a character known as the Burnt One meets a small candle-like being called Potboy and the two venture off to the Midnight Walk, where they must traverse to the top of Moon Mountain and bring light back to the world while avoiding ravenous monsters who want to consume Potboy's flame, including the living embodiment of the Dark itself.

== Development ==
The Midnight Walk was developed by MoonHood, with Fast Travel Games publishing the title. MoonHood is made up of developers from Zoink, who formerly worked on Lost in Random and Ghost Giant. The game was created using more than 700 clay models that were 3D-scanned into the game. Stop motion animation was utilized to animate character movement. The team described The Midnight Walk as a "cozy horror adventure", and that the main themes of the story revolve around "light, darkness, and fire". The team was inspired by Over the Garden Wall, The Nightmare Before Christmas, The Little Match Girl, Half-Life 2 and works of David Lynch and H.C. Andersen while creating the title.

The Midnight Walk was announced on September 24, 2024, with release scheduled for May 8, 2025.

== Film ==
In June 2025, film and television adaptations were announced to be in development at production company Story Kitchen, in collaboration with MoonHood, with Dmitri M. Johnson and Michael Lawrence Goldberg producing.

== Reception ==
Reception

Aggregate scores
Aggregator	Score
Metacritic	(PC) 79/100 (PS5) 77/100
OpenCritic	83% recommend

Review scores
Publication	Score
Eurogamer	3/5
Game Informer	8/10
IGN	9/10
Shacknews	8/10

The game received "generally favorable reviews" according to review aggregator Metacritic. Fellow review aggregator OpenCritic assessed that the game received strong approval, being recommended by 83% of critics.

The visual style of the game was strongly praised by critics. Will Borger from IGN wrote that the game's world was "stunning, often emotionally devastating", and described that the game was "visually arresting". Charles Harte from Game Informer compared the game's art style to works by Tim Burton and stop-motion films. Harte also praised the game's "earnest" soundtracks for effectively conveying the emotional messages of the game's story. Tom Orry from Eurogamer described the game as a "delightful audiovisual experience", praising its dreamlike visual design, and adding that the soundtracks were "tonally spot-on for a world so bleak, but with an inkling of hope".

Borger also praised the game's story and cast of characters, describing them as "memorable" and contributing to an evocative narrative. While noting that the game was only about seven to eight hours long, he felt that the overall experience captivated him from start to finish. Harte noted the game's whimsical tone, noting that playing the game felt similar to "playing through an old children's book". While Orry felt that the game's emotional beats were touching and sincere and noted that the five chapters tackled subjects such as loneliness, grief, and regret, the overarching narrative was disappointing. Most critics agreed that the game was mechanically simple and unambitious, with Josh Cilds from Shacknews comparing it to a walking simulator.

=== Awards ===
Year	Award	Category	Result	Ref.
2025	Golden Joystick Awards	Best Visual Design	Nominated	
2025	The Game Awards 2025	Best VR/AR Game	Won	
2025	The Steam Awards 2025	VR Game of the Year	Won	
2026	15th New York Game Awards	Coney Island Dreamland Award for Best AR/VR Game	Nominated	
2026	29th Annual D.I.C.E. Awards	Immersive Reality Game of the Year	Nominated	
2026	29th Annual D.I.C.E. Awards	Outstanding Achievement in Animation	Nominated	
2026	29th Annual D.I.C.E. Awards	Outstanding Achievement in Art Direction	Nominated	
2026	22nd British Academy Games Awards	Debut Game	Nominated	
2026	Develop:Star Awards 2026	Best Visual Art	Nominated	
