= We Happy Few =

2018 video game

- Box art
- Developer: Compulsion Games
- Publisher: Gearbox Publishing (Note: Currently published by Xbox Game Studios on GOG.com and PlayStation Network, and self-published on Steam)
- Director: Guillaume Provost
- Producer: Sam Abbott
- Designer: David Sears
- Programmer: Matt Robinson
- Artist: Whitney Clayton
- Writers: Alex Epstein; Lisa Hunter
- Composers: Nicolas Marquis, Jon Licht
- Engine: Unreal Engine 4
- Platforms: Windows; PlayStation 4; Xbox One
- Release: 10 August 2018
- Genres: Action-adventure, stealth, survival
- Mode: Single-player

We Happy Few is an action-adventure video game developed by Compulsion Games and published by Gearbox Publishing. In 2016, an early access version was released for Windows, with the full game seeing wide release for PlayStation 4, Windows, and Xbox One in August 2018.

Played from a first-person perspective, the game combines role-playing, survival, and light roguelike elements. Taking place within the retro-futuristic version of the mid-1960s, following an alternative version of World War II, players take control over one of three characters, each of whom seek to complete a personal task while escaping the fictional city of Wellington Wells – a crumbling dystopia on the verge of societal collapse, due to the overuse of a hallucinogenic drug that keeps its inhabitants blissfully unaware about the truth of their world, while leaving them easily manipulated and lacking morals.

The developers focused on creating a story with strong narratives, while underlining gameplay with a sense of paranoia, and designing in-game decisions that are of moral gray areas and weight, which influence and affect later parts of We Happy Few. Design of the game's setting was based on various elements of 1960s British culture, with developer Compulsion Games seeking inspiration on dystopian societies from various influences in the media, such as Brazil, Nineteen Eighty-Four, Animal Farm, Fahrenheit 451, Brave New World, and heavily on the MaddAddam trilogy. Work on the game began with a Kickstarter funding campaign in 2015, before the developers were acquired by Microsoft Studios in 2018, supporting the developers to work on a version for the Xbox One.

We Happy Few received mixed reviews from critics.

== Gameplay ==
We Happy Few is an action game played from the first-person perspective that includes elements of stealth and survival games. Players control one of three characters in the game's three different acts, each having their own skills and abilities, and their own reasons for escaping the village of Wellington Wells. Arthur Hastings is a well-balanced character adept at running and blending in; Sally Boyle is adept at sneaking and crafting chemical concoctions; and Ollie Starkey is adept at combat and crafting powerful explosives.

The game uses procedural generation to create the layouts of some parts of the game world at the start of each playthrough. Each act presents the player with a main story goal, with a series of main quests to follow, with several optional side quests that can be completed to gain additional rewards. Completing objectives can earn the player character rewards as well as skill points which the player can allocate among a skill tree to improve the character's attributes or give them new abilities, with each character having a special "Super-Duper" branch that improves their weaknesses and faults by strengthening them.

Throughout the game, the player can collect melee weapons, items, food, and wealth. Items are used to craft various tools to help progress in the world, like lockpicks, or medication, like healing balms, and can usually be found through simple scavenging or foraging. Food is used to maintain nourishment or thirst; staying nourished improves certain character attributes, while being hungry or thirsty can negatively impact these attributes. The player also must make sure the character gets rest to maintain these attributes, as well as their fighting performance. The player can gain access to underground safe houses dubbed "Hatches" for recovery, as well as to fast travel between other unlocked safe houses. This is not automatic, however, as the player character must restore the hatch to working order to unlock the hatch fast travel. Wealth can be gained through looting phone boxes, crates, safes, or through bartering with various vendors, where you may also exchange your wealth for various items and delicacies.

A core element of We Happy Few is Joy, an addictive hallucinogenic pill used by most of the citizens of Wellington Wells to make them forget the past and be happy. If the player opts to have their character use Joy, they will see the town in a colorful, joyful environment, and will be able to walk through the city without attracting undue attention from its citizens. This allows the player to pass through "Downer Detectors" without raising suspicion, but this does impair some of the character's abilities. As their Joy depletes, the town will revert to its dismal, war-torn state. While the player will have full control of their abilities, they will be seen as a "Downer", a threat to the stability of the people's happiness.

Whenever the player is caught, they must either fight off the citizens and police force through combat, or use stealth to sneak around the town and hide from pursuers. Furthermore, the player-character will suffer withdrawal effects from coming off Joy, impacting their health and thirst, as well as highly raising the suspicion meter of enemies. Should the player-character take too much damage from enemies or the environment, they will have to restart at a recent checkpoint. Optionally, the game allows the player to enable permadeath, requiring them to restart the game should the player-character die. The player must also account for their clothing; outside the Garden District where wastrels live, if the player-character is caught wearing a torn suit no matter if they take their Joy, they will be hunted down by the residents. Some pieces of clothing allow a player to conform in restricted areas, disarm traps in broad daylight without a fuss, or take honey from bees without being stung to death.

=== Arcade Mode ===
The 1.7 update included the Arcade Mode, which added three new game modes: Survival, The Night Watch, and Sandbox. The player can save while in Survival and Sandbox (unless permadeath is on, in which case one cannot save), but not The Night Watch.

Survival mode focuses more on the game's survival features and requires close attention to the chosen character's physical needs. The player spawns on one of several islands of different sizes (the player can choose from a small, medium or large island) with different layouts; the islands are a mix of the Garden District and Hamlyn Village. The player can choose one of the three characters from the campaign to play as they progress through the campaign. On each Island there are two notable locations (a black circle with an eye on it) which each contain either a bridge key-card or a boat capacitor, and they have to use the key cards to unlock the bridges to the other islands. The player's score depends on how long they survive and if they managed to escape by collecting the five boat capacitors located around the map and repairing a boat in the boat house. The player has to find safe houses on the island, but they cannot sleep in an occupied house (the occupants will awake immediately). They can also fast travel to any safe-house that they have located, from anywhere on the map (unless they are in combat). The player must explore others houses and buildings around the map to find food and water to avoid starving and dehydrating, which will end the game (if on permadeath mode; otherwise, they will respawn back at the last hatch they visited.)

The Night Watch mode focuses on the game's combat features and instead of being a downer, the player plays as a Bobby named John Constable (or "Constable Constable" for short). The player spawns on a randomly generated island in the Village of Hamlyn, with no bridges leading off of the island. The mode is round-based, and to advance the rounds, the player must eliminate all enemies that spawn in until the rounds timer ends, in which the player can use a Bobby Popper to end the round. The player earns money (pounds) by eliminating enemies, consisting of Downers, "Headboys", Plaguies, and Wastrels. Witches can spawn, serving as mini-bosses and dealing the most damage out of any enemy, but also give major rewards when defeated. As well as spending their money on vending machines to gain better gear and items, players must spend their money on Joy, which they need to do regularly as their Joy Meter goes down. If the player character run out of Joy, the game ends. Joy starts at £20, but the price goes up every round. The player always takes Blackberry Flavour of Joy, a rarer version of the drug exclusively made for the Bobbies. As the player defeats enemies, their Rage Meter grows, with one slot of it being filled per elimination. Upon completely filling the meter, the player can activate Rage Mode, in which the player's stamina is unused and the Joy Meter is halted.

In Sandbox Mode, the player can do whatever they want, there is no goal. The player can choose how they want the island to be by changing the height variation, layout, size, and the island composition. They also can choose their character out of the three from the campaign, what they spawn with, and NPC density. They can also choose if permadeath is on or off.

== Plot ==
=== Setting ===
The game takes place in an alternate historical timeline, in which Franklin D. Roosevelt is assassinated in 1933, allowing Senator Huey Long to become President of the United States. Under Long, it is implied that Japan did not attack the United States, and did not give them a reason to fight against Germany, leaving the United Kingdom to defend itself from the German forces alone. The Battle of Britain was lost, allowing the Germans to invade and occupy the entire country. Most of the volunteer forces of the Home Guard became complicit in helping the Germans, with only a few attempting to resist.

At some point during the occupation, the population of the island town of Wellington Wells did what is initially only alluded to as a "Very Bad Thing" that caused the Germans to voluntarily leave their island, allowing the British citizens there to live free. However, the repercussions of the Very Bad Thing left the citizens with immense anguish and guilt over their actions, leading to the invention of a new hallucinogenic drug called "Joy", which suppresses all unhappy memories and leaves its user in a chemically-induced euphoria, while also brightening how they perceive their environment. However, its many adverse side effects include addiction, short-term memory loss, loss of appetite, nightmarish hallucinations, and being susceptible to manipulation.

By the 1960s, Wellington Wells' isolation led to resounding advances in technology, including Tesla-styled weapons, portable power cells, and automated security systems. Its inhabitants—referred to as "Wellies"—wear white "Happy Face" masks, which were created to forcefully mold the wearer's cheekbones into a smile, resulting in the wearer permanently smiling. Joy is freely dispensed in pill form and is also laced into the city's water supply. To encourage the drug's consumption, the media is tightly controlled and centers on "Uncle" Jack Worthing, a friendly presenter whose voice and image widely broadcasts government propaganda over the city's televisions and radios.

Some Wellies developed immunity to Joy—partly due to ingesting bad batches of the drug—and subsequently became depressed or insane from remembering the Very Bad Thing; these people were then driven out of Wellington Wells and came to be known as "Wastrels". Others who voluntarily refuse their Joy are known as "Downers" and seen as a threat; if caught, Downers are either force-fed Joy, are taken to a Joy Doctor to get a potentially lethal liquid injection of Joy, or are outright killed on the spot. As a result, Wellington Wells has become a dystopian police state on the verge of collapse.

=== Story ===
The game features three different playable characters, each with their own story arcs that intersect throughout the game:

Arthur's Story: Arthur Hastings (Alex Wyndham) works as a censor approving or redacting old news articles from Wellington Wells' Department of Archives, Printing, and Recycling. While working, he comes across a news clipping of him and his older brother Percy (Bradley Henderson) after World War II. At this point, Arthur can either take his Joy (which ends the game) or refuse it, wanting to remember Percy. If the latter choice is taken, Arthur attends an office party with his boss, Victoria Byng (Katherine Kingsley), and watches in horror as Victoria and his co-workers consume a rat that they hallucinate to be a candy-filled piñata. He is then called out as a Downer and chased by two police constables, ending up in the Garden District, now populated by Wastrels. Arthur resolves to escape Wellington Wells and find Percy.

With the assistance of various characters, Arthur works his way through the districts uncovering certain truths along the way. It is eventually revealed that the "Very Bad Thing" was when the population of Wellington Wells turned over all children under the age of 13 years to the Germans in exchange for their freedom. Arthur discovers that the German tanks used to threaten the town into compliance were actually dummy tanks made of papier-mâché, and that while the populace could have resisted, they did not out of fear. He also learns that Wellington Wells is slowly falling apart; the city's infrastructure is failing, an unspecified disease outbreak has occurred, and Joy is becoming less effective, with scientist Anton Verloc (Michael Shaeffer) researching a new version of Joy to permanently lobotomize the populace and keep them in a never-ending state of euphoria. Eventually, Arthur reaches a railway bridge leading out of Wellington Wells, and recalls that he swapped his identity card (which stated his age as 12) with Percy's (who had just turned 13) before the children of Wellington Wells boarded the fateful train to Germany, effectively sacrificing his brother to save himself.

Sally's Story: The creator of a new brand of Joy, Sally Boyle (Charlotte Hope), works as an experimental chemist in her laboratory after being kicked out of Haworth Labs by its director, Anton Verloc. The local police constabulary threaten Sally into supplying them with her Joy, which forces her to scrounge the city for new ingredients to create a fresh batch.

Sally is secretly a mother to the first baby born in Wellington Wells in a long time: Gwen, who Verloc fathered. When Gwen becomes sick with measles, Sally asks Arthur, her childhood friend, to find a bottle of cod liver oil. Arthur, not knowing it is for Gwen, agrees in return for a Letter of Transit from General Robert Byng (Stephen Boxer), Sally's most prominent patron and on-and-off lover. Sally eventually remembers how her mother poisoned her family when she and her siblings were to be taken to Germany, leaving Sally as the sole survivor. Arthur delivers the oil and considers having Sally join his escape, but he changes his mind and leaves when she tells him about Gwen.

Determined to flee Wellington Wells with Gwen, Sally plans to steal General Byng's personal motorboat hidden near his military base. She convinces Dr. Helen Faraday (Samantha Lee) to create a new engine for the boat but fails to steal the key, getting knocked out by a sleeping dart trap. She awakens to find herself with General Byng in his safehouse; Byng intends to keep Sally imprisoned there until the problems in Wellington Wells are resolved while sending Gwen away to the mainland. Sally refuses, fights Byng, takes the key to the boat, and locks him inside the safehouse. Sally sneaks Gwen to the boat at night and rides it out of Wellington Wells.

Ollie's Story: Ollie Starkey (Allan James Cooke) is a former British Army soldier, who lives as a recluse at his fortified hideout in the Garden District. His only company is a talking hallucination of his daughter, Margaret (Eloise Webb), killed years ago during the Very Bad Thing.

After helping Arthur along his journey and having his hideout destroyed by Wastrels, he finds his former commander, General Byng. He informs him of the papier-mâché tanks Arthur had discovered. Byng reveals that he knew about the fake tanks but remained quiet to avoid a rebellion, which he doubts would have been successful. He also reveals that Ollie knew about the tanks as well, having served as Byng's orderly at the time. Unable to remember, Ollie leaves to confront Byng's daughter, Victoria. Ollie captures her and withholds her Joy, forcing her to remember that she had helped the Germans during the Very Bad Thing. Both aware of the city's true history, Ollie informs her that the city's food has run out and implores her to help him reveal these truths to save the people. Victoria agrees, but when Ollie releases her, she attacks him and escapes.

After finding the town's executive committee too addled on Joy to pay any mind to the tanks or the famine, Ollie decides to confront Uncle Jack (Julian Casey), Wellington Wells' friendly celebrity propagandist. Ollie infiltrates his broadcasting studio above City Hall, but he finds the studio is abandoned and Jack is missing. He plays a tape of his final but unreleased broadcast, in which Jack suffers an emotional breakdown brought about by resurfacing memories of his daughter Margaret and despairs over the town's hopeless situation. Ollie finally realizes that Margaret was actually Jack's daughter; Jack had tried to hide her from the Germans, but Ollie (who was their neighbor and hated Jack for being a collaborator) informed on them, and she was shot trying to flee. Now willing to atone, Ollie broadcasts the unreleased tape to the city, awakening the population. He then bids farewell to Margaret and builds a hot air balloon that he rides out of Wellington Wells.

Epilogue: After Sally and Ollie's chapters have been completed, the player can choose one of two endings: either Arthur departs Wellington Wells for the mainland and continues his search for Percy, or takes a memory-destroying pill and rejoins the populace in their ignorance. If Arthur continues to the mainland, he encounters an impoverished young child complaining about the rainy weather, indicating other towns in England did not follow the path Wellington Wells did.

== Downloadable content ==
The game's downloadable content (DLC) are playable stories that follow some of the residents in Wellington Wells that occur before, during, or after the main survivors' journey.

They Came From Below: The first DLC story which follows lovers Roger Bacon and James Maxwell, two houseboys who are in search of their superior Dr. Faraday (who created Wellington Wells' technology) in an underground facility populated with hostile robots. The player, controlling Roger, fights with a futuristic raygun that can kill robot enemies or interact with special buttons (which can convert to a mace for melee combat). Roger also acquires a satellite device (which was shown in Arthur's story) capable of moving mechanisms or terrain, and a stopwatch-like "ChronoBomb" that can slow time.

The story starts with Roger returning home from a shopping trip to discover Dr. Faraday's laboratory in ruins, and arriving just in time to discover Faraday falling through a portal in her laboratory. He quickly rouses James, who has been knocked unconscious, spurring the couple to attempt to find Dr. Faraday. After discovering a hatch located below the stairs to a hidden shelter, Roger and James discover a massive facility beneath Faraday's lab populated with hostile robots who speak in Faraday's voice. Roger make his way through the facility while James uses the blueprints to guide him via radio in an attempt to locate Faraday and stop the robot menace. Roger discovers clues about the robots' origins; they and the Motilene (the city's power source) are from space, there are two different robot variants that each have their own language, and the robots are self-aware. He then meets a disassembled friendly robot named Watson who reveals that Dr. Faraday has been kidnapping and reprogramming the robots for slavery because Wellington Wells is running out of food and no one farms anymore.

Roger aims to both save Faraday and help the robots. James, however, still thinks Faraday is doing something for the good of mankind and is growing to no longer trust Roger. Roger destroys the reprogramming chamber, causing Faraday to see him as a threat, and decides to destroy the robots' portal. Roger tries to go to the portal chamber, but James stops him. Roger knocks him out and activates the security systems at the entrance to the portal. Faraday controls a Headmistress, a giant robotic supervisor, to stop his interference. James changes his mind and helps Roger defeat her. Watson and a few robots meet them to congratulate the two and bring Faraday back home to be "reprogrammed". Roger asks to come with them; Watson agrees but informs Roger that if he wants to return home, the portal will only open onto a different time. Roger can then choose to bring James with him or not. If he decides to bring James, the two men will share a kiss and walk together through the portal. If he decides to go without James, he will bid him farewell and say he hopes to see James again.

Lightbearer: The second DLC story that follows Wellington Wells' local rock superstar, Nick Lightbearer (whose real name is Norbert Pickles). In this DLC, Nick does not use weapons to fend off his crazed fans; instead, Nick dispatches them by playing music on his electric guitar. Since there is no map available to guide him, he plays his guitar in front of the gilded full-body statues molded in his likeness to indicate his current destination.

During a fan convention, Nick wakes one morning in his hotel room hallucinating a talking rat with the voice of his ex-agent Virgil. Nick's clothes are soaked in blood and he is unable to recall the events that led to his situation. Nick follows Virgil's advice and flees the hotel, returning to his old home which has been converted into a museum. After having a hallucinated battle with his ex-wife Petunia, Nick is instructed by Virgil to try and remember the events of last night. Nick realizes he wrote down a record of events in the form of lyrics, and plays them to his music to try and jog his memory. After experiencing a disturbing dream showing the real Virgil being murdered, Nick wakes up back in his hotel room as if nothing happened. He then heads down to the bar to try and make sense of everything, when he runs into Morrie Memento, a pianist he had fired from his band. Nick finds one of Morrie's songs familiar, and recovers his piano tuner in order to hear the full version.

Morrie reveals he first heard the tune being hummed from the roof, leading Nick to investigate and finding the body of a music shop owner he had met last night. This triggers another vivid vision of the music shop owner being murdered, and Nick wakes back up in the hotel room, this time with a dead woman. Nick comes to believe he murdered Virgil and many other people, and suffers more vivid hallucinations where he is taunted by the infamous serial killer Foggy Jack, who reveals he is the one who murdered Virgil and many of Nick's fans. Nick defeats Foggy Jack and then performs a concert for his fans, promising to change his hedonistic lifestyle.

We All Fall Down: The final DLC story is about Arthur's former supervisor, Victoria Byng, who is the daughter of General Robert Byng, a customer of Sally's. After escaping Ollie's custody, Victoria must deal with Joy withdrawal as well as the collapse of law and order in Wellington Wells. She is armed with a whip that she can use to both attack enemies and access higher levels to avoid danger. She also has a dart gun to silently dispatch enemies and disable security defences.

After escaping from Ollie and getting her whip, Victoria is able to return to town. However, with the effects of Joy having worn off, she can clearly see that the citizens of Wellington Wells are unknowingly suffering from famine and plague. She also begins seeing visions of her mother, who gives her advice on how to proceed. Victoria confronts her father, General Byng, about the town's problems, and he instructs her to start taking her Joy again and check in on Dr. Verloc at Haworth Labs, where he is working on a permanent replacement for Joy. However, her progress is halted by a strike by the lab workers, who demand that Sally be reinstated to her position in the lab. After helping suppress the strike, Victoria confronts Dr. Verloc. Realizing that Dr. Verloc has no permanent solution and is willing to let the populace die off to "sustainable" levels, Victoria resolves to cut off the town's Joy supply to wean them off the drug.

In order to achieve these, she destroys both the pill allocator and water treatment plant responsible for distributing Joy throughout the town. She is arrested and thrown in jail, where she remembers how her mother was imprisoned in India for supporting Indian independence from Britain. General Byng helps her escape, and informs her about his safe house where he has stockpiled supplies and an escape boat. Shocked at her father's cowardice and willingness to abandon the town to its fate, Victoria rejects his offer and resolves to save the town. In order to permanently stop all Joy production, she demolishes Haworth Labs, narrowly escaping its destruction. The combination of the destruction of the Joy supply and the broadcast of Uncle Jack's final recording sends Wellington Wells into complete anarchy as the enraged citizens slaughter each other. When Victoria regains consciousness, she comes across a group of survivors who blame her for the destruction of the town and decide to leave. Saddened that the people she saved have come to hate her, Victoria wonders what to do next. The vision of her mother suggests that she should return to India and find her real mother, who may still be alive.

== Development ==
Artwork of the game's NPCs, whose fashion and hairstyles, alongside the main characters of the game, evoke those of 1960s Britain.

We Happy Few is Compulsion Games' second game following its 2013 game Contrast. The game, powered by Unreal Engine 4, has tripled the development staff from Contrast. Some inspiration for We Happy Few came at the end of Contrast's development, as studio founder and producer Guillaume Provost had to struggle with the death of his father three weeks before Contrast shipped. During this time, he had reflected on his state of life, and came up with ideas for We Happy Few in his emotional distress, particularly the idea of a society fixated on drugs and masks. Provost presented this to his creative team, who saw the possibilities of expanding on this. Narrative director Alex Epstein considered the idea similar to Prozac Nation, and where in current times, there is a prescription drug for every conceivable malady. The title of the game comes from the St Crispin's Day Speech from Henry V:

And Crispin Crispian shall ne'er go by,
From this day to the ending of the world,
But we in it shall be rememberèd—
We few, we happy few, we band of brothers

— William Shakespeare, Henry V

Narratively, the game's setting was established early: an isolated British town in the 1960s where there were no children, and everyone else wore masks and took drugs. From that point, they worked backwards to create the history of the town, tying it to events from World War II, and recognizing that characters would have their own sins of the past as well as those of the entire town. In developing the title, Compulsion Games wanted the player to feel paranoia as they try to determine what actions they need to take in a moral gray area, and crafting "a simulation that provides an intelligent response and maintains [the player's] suspense of disbelief" based on how the player performs in the game. This in turn led to the use of light roguelike elements such as permadeath and procedurally generated worlds. Permadeath was added to try to implore a sense of danger to the player knowing that any action could lead to the end of the game, while the random generation would create tension as the player would need to relearn the layout of the town each time. Provost likened the concept to the survival game Don't Starve, though set in a 3D dystopian world.

The procedural generation also fell out from Compulsion's previous experience in building Contrast, in that they recognized that as a five-person studio, they lacked the man-power to develop a lot of high-quality content. They opted to use random generation of the town both to address this, as well as a difficult challenge that had not been done before in video games. Joy was considered as a necessary evil for the player; by having their character take the drug, the player would enjoy short-term gains such as getting out of trouble and being able to explore without fear of attacks, but would have negative long-term effects once Joy wore out. Provost considered that with the permadeath mechanic, the player would need to put a great deal of consideration into using Joy as to preserve their current game knowing there will be consequences later.

=== Influences ===
Influential works of fiction, such as Doctor Who, BioShock, V for Vendetta and The Prisoner, provided inspiration for developers with shaping the retrofuturistic, dystopian world of "We Happy Few".

While Compulsion Games are a Canadian studio based out of Montreal, many of them are fascinated by British television and film, which formed much of the influence on We Happy Few. The 1960s British setting was found to be ideal for the game and concept; according to Compulsion's COO Sam Abbott, this was "a great period with lots of relentless optimism about the future, while also at the same time ignoring a lot of actual problems that existed in the society of the time". Dystopic fiction was a common influence. Provost stated that a primary influence was the 1985 dystopian film Brazil. Other influential works include The Prisoner, A Clockwork Orange, Brave New World, V for Vendetta and Doctor Who, along with the humor of Monty Python and Blowup for the game's aesthetics. Some of the Compulsion team, including Provost, had been with Arkane Studios during a time where they were secretly developing an episode for the Half-Life series, also set in a dystopian world, which carried into We Happy Few.

Provost felt the belief of citizens that they were in a utopia and the darker reality "under the hood" formed the "basis" of dystopian fiction. The idea of the Wellies wearing masks was seen as flipping around the use of Guy Fawkes masks in V for Vendetta, that instead of being a sign of resistance, they would be "a symbol of the psychological oppression", forcing their wearer to be smiling all the time, according to Provost.

We Happy Few has been said by some to be a cross between video games series BioShock, Fallout and Don't Starve, and novels Brave New World and Nineteen Eighty-Four. The main characters were also seen as amalgamations from these types of works: Arthur as a mix of Winston Smith from Nineteen Eighty-Four and Sam Lowry from Brazil, while Uncle Jack is seen as a mix of Jack Nicholson's Joker from Batman and Lewis Prothero from V for Vendetta. The developers commented on difficulties distinguishing the game from BioShock in the public eye, and though Provost said he was "flattered" by the comparison, he argued it was never a "prime influencer". Describing the meaning behind the story, Alex Epstein was quoted as saying "We Happy Few is inspired by, among other things, prescription drug culture — the idea that no one should have to be sad if they can pop a pill and fix it. It's also about Happy Facebook culture: no one shares their bad news because it would bring everyone down. As a culture, we no longer value sadness."

=== Announcement and development ===
We Happy Few was revealed on 26 February 2015, and publicly debuted at PAX East 2015, allowing attendees to go hands-on with a very early version of the project. During June 2015, Compulsion Games ran a successful Kickstarter campaign, raising US$266,163 of the target US$200,000 to fund the development of the game. About 2,000 of these supporters backed at levels to participate in the game's alpha-version testing alongside Compulsion's dedicated play-testing team of five, but Compulsion found this did not provide them enough feedback to know which way to take the narrative elements within the randomly generated world. Instead, Compulsion opted to open the game to an early access release in a playable state on various storefronts for Windows and on the Xbox One Xbox Game Preview program starting on 26 July 2016 as to be able to gain much more feedback. Part of their choice to use early access was to provide transparency of what the game was actually to be, wanting to avoid the pitfalls that happened with No Man's Sky on its release in August 2016. Compulsion found many were anticipating a AAA gaming experience from their small team, and thus wanted to make sure players were clear on what their goals were for We Happy Few.

One issue faced during development in early access was managing the expectations of what We Happy Few was meant to be. The first trailers Compulsion released as well as the early access version, featuring a short narrative sequence introducing the playable character Arthur, created the impression that the game would be a first-person action-adventure game with a linear narrative. These early versions of We Happy Few were frequently compared to BioShock, a first-person shooter with a strong narrative produced by Irrational Games on a triple-A budget, and well outside the class of game that Compulsion was seeking to make. Compulsion maintained it was aiming to produce a roguelike survival game with some light narrative elements, which was meant to be played repeatedly, with a complete playthrough taking only three to four hours. Compulsion was aware that early access had worked well for games that lacked a strong narrative, and thus focused the initial development within early access on the survival elements, planning to hold back on the narrative development until late in the process as they did not want to reveal the full story until late in development. Compulsion also found it difficult to convince players that story elements were coming for the game's final release.

Compulsion learned that players from early access were much more interested in the game's narrative over the game's survival or roguelike mechanics. At one point, the studio tried to remove the survival elements leaving only the action-adventure gameplay, but felt this affected the balance and flavor of the title, since Wellington Wells was meant to be a society on the verge of collapse due to dwindling resources. Instead, they added in some of the basics of survival gameplay: instead of potentially killing the player character, factors like nourishment and rest will buff the character if satisfied or debuff them if not met, and the permadeath facet was taken out, made as an option for more hard-core players. Some issues arose from Compulsion's onboarding of new staff as the game grew. While the experience these new developers brought to the game ultimate improved it according to Provost, their initial contributions shifted the direction of the game and created instability in the development process. In retrospective, Provost stated that they likely would have dropped the procedurally generated elements once they had focused more on the narrative, as the combination of the two "doesn't make any sense".

Compulsion also put more effort into creating narrative encounters with unique characters, and level spaces for these to occur within the procedurally generated world. Feedback from players were positive about the unique characters they had made to support the shorter form of the game, so Compulsion had to spend more time in creating backgrounds and stories for more unique characters, which took away from some other story aspects they wanted to tell. They also had little time to make new cinematics to help explain some of these backstories, and instead resorted to using audio recordings to help flesh out the characters. Narrative director Alex Epstein felt the added time to make the changes helped to make the game more cohesive, making it felt that the main story and the various procedurally generated side narratives were part of a wholly singular game rather than disparate pieces. Community manager Naila Hadjas stated that with these changes, they estimated the full game now was about 20 hours long, but still offering replayability through the procedural generation aspects, different playable characters and difficulty modes.

In January 2018, the studio announced that while the game was now "content complete", they needed to polish the game further, and pushed back the game's release towards mid-2018. This move was also aimed to avoiding having to provide regular updates to early access purchasers, allowing them to finish the game without external pressure from fans. Alongside this, in response to complaints regarding the price change, disabled the ability to pre-order the game and offered full refunds to anyone that had bought the title earlier regardless of playtime.

=== Promotion and release ===
Microsoft has been a major supporter for Compulsion Games in backing We Happy Few, leading to the game having its console debut on the Xbox One. Microsoft announced We Happy Few as part of their press conferences at Gamescom in August 2015, Electronic Entertainment Expo 2016. and Electronic Entertainment Expo 2018. This last presentation was accompanied by the news that Microsoft Studios had acquired Compulsion Games as part of their in-house studios.

In August 2017, Compulsion Games announced that they have partnered with Gearbox Software for financial support to expand the game into a retail-length title, planned to release on 13 April 2018. Compulsion's Provost had known Gearbox's Randy Pitchford prior to their release of Contrast, and Contrast's visual style had caught Pitchford's attention, but the studio lacked a publishing arm at the time. By E3 2016, where Microsoft presented We Happy Few as part of its press event, Gearbox operated its Gearbox Publishing division led by Steve Gibson. Gibson, also interested in what We Happy Few offered, invited Compulsion to their offices to discuss financing and publishing opportunities for the game. Gearbox's funding helped Compulsion expand their team four-fold and expand the scope and narrative of the game. With Gearbox's help, Compulsion was able to develop We Happy Few for the PlayStation 4, while Gearbox will publish retail versions for all platforms; Microsoft's acquisition of the studio did not impact this publishing deal. However, Compulsion also said that with this expanded title, the price of the game will be increased from $30 to $60, with those that backed the Kickstarter or purchased the early access versions getting the full game and some of the downloadable content that is planned for free. Compulsion plans to offer a season pass for additional content that will be developed after release, enabled by Gearbox's backing. Compulsion's community manager Nadia Hadjas said that neither Microsoft nor Gearbox provided oversight on the game, allowing Compulsion to develop the title based on their own goals and the community's feedback.

In May 2018, the Australian Classification Board had refused classification for We Happy Few, identifying that gameplay mechanics around the use of Joy pills was problematic, which would prevent the game from being sold in Australia. The Board stated in their refusal that because "the game's drug-use mechanic making game progression less difficult constitutes an incentive or reward for drug-use and therefore, the game exceeds the R18+ classification that states, 'drug use related to incentives and rewards is not permitted'". Compulsion Games said that it was working with the Board to challenge their ruling and make the game appropriate to be rated, stating that they believe that the use of Joy was part of the game's themes, "It's a society that is forcing its citizens to take Joy, and the whole point of the game is to reject this programming and fight back", and compared this theme to that of Aldous Huxley's Brave New World and Terry Gilliam's Brazil. Compulsion Games said they were prepared to offer refunds even to Kickstarter backers from Australia should they be unable to achieve a rating. The Australian Ratings Board agreed to review their classification, offering interested parties to also reply in standing for reclassification of the game during the month of July 2018. On 3 July, the Board announced that they had reclassified We Happy Few with an R18+ rating, still warning consumers of its drug-use mechanic, but otherwise clearing the title to be sold within Australia.

The full game was released for PlayStation 4, Windows, and Xbox One on 10 August 2018. On 27 November 2018, Dark Horse Comics released a 192-page book titled The Art of We Happy Few.

== Reception ==
Reception

Aggregate score
Aggregator	Score
Metacritic	PC: 62/100; PS4: 67/100; XONE: 64/100

Review scores
Publication	Score
Destructoid	5/10
Easy Allies	6/10
Game Informer	7.75/10
GameRevolution	3/5
GamesRadar+	4/5
Hardcore Gamer	3/5
PC Gamer (US)	56/100
Shacknews	8/10
USgamer	2.5/5
VideoGamer.com	4/10

We Happy Few received "mixed or average" reviews, according to review aggregator website Metacritic.

The audio was received positively, with the voice-acting being singled out for praise. Brittany Vincent of Shacknews elaborated that the characters' "stereotypical" accents along with the "peppy" music lent the game a "realistic lilt that make these weirdos even creepier". The performances for the three main characters were commended; Tyler Wilde of PC Gamer deemed the leads to be the game's great strength, describing them as "blending comedy and tragedy with calculated balance", and added that they spoke to themselves so naturally that Wilde nearly overlooked that they were "doing the videogame thing of saying everything out loud for no reason". Michael Huber of Easy Allies additionally cited the disconcerting effect of Uncle Jack's broadcasts. However, while Sam Spyrison of Hardcore Gamer agreed that the voice-acting was mostly solid, he felt that the dialogue was inconsistent, saying that it "ranges from original and enticing to disjointed and nonsensical". The music was appreciated, with Brian Shae of Game Informer and Caty McCarthy of USgamer singling out the use of distorted 1960s-style rock and roll music as a contribution to the game's haunting atmosphere.

James Stephanie Sterling called the game "a joyless broken disaster" and suggested that it should be recalled. Sterling, having performed some minor voice-over work for the game during its crowdfunding phase, stated their embarrassment "for having the loosest of loose associations" with the final game. Eurogamer praised the addition of a playable protagonist who is a mother, although did also cite inconsistencies within the game.

=== Accolades ===
Year	Award	Category	Result	Ref.
2016	Game Critics Awards	Best Original Game	Nominated	
2016	Game Critics Awards	Best Independent Game	Nominated	
2018	Golden Joystick Awards	Best Visual Design	Nominated	
2019	National Academy of Video Game Trade Reviewers Awards	Art Direction, Period Influence	Nominated	
2019	National Academy of Video Game Trade Reviewers Awards	Use of Sound, New IP	Nominated	
2019	2019 Webby Awards	Best Writing	Won	

== Film adaptation ==
In March 2017, Gold Circle Films announced plans to adapt the game into a feature film in partnership with Compulsion Games and dj2 Entertainment.
