= Patricia McKenzie =

Canadian actress, producer, dancer and singer

- Born: 1987 (age 38–39); Les Îles-de-la-Madeleine, Quebec, Canada
- Occupations: actress; dancer; singer

Patricia McKenzie (born March 3, 1987) is a Canadian actress, producer, dancer and singer.

== Career ==
Patricia is best known as an actress for her role in Cosmopolis and on television as Reena in Charlie Jade and Jenn in Naked Josh.

On stage, McKenzie has performed in numerous musicals, including The Lion King, the French production of Chicago, and Notre-Dame de Paris.

Her film and television roles include Gangland Undercover, Sigma, Stardom, Soul Food, Blue Murder, Bliss, Bob Gratton: Ma Vie, Student Bodies, Flowers Don't Last, The Take-Away Bride, Tout sur moi and Cosmopolis.

== Filmography ==
- TSN Caribbean Workout (1998)
- No Alibi (2000)
- Student Bodies (2000)
- La vie après l'amour (2000)
- Stardom (2000)
- Soul Food (2002)
- Blue Murder (2003)
- Bliss (2004)
- Naked Josh (2004–2006)
- Sigma (2005)
- The Take-Away Bride (2005)
- Charlie Jade (2005)
- Flowers Don't Last (2006)
- Bob Gratton, ma vie/My Life (2007)
- Les Sœurs Elliot (2007–2008)
- The Perfect Assistant (2008)
- Tout sur moi (2008)
- The Telephone Eulogies (2008)
- Phantom (2009)
- Die (2010)
- Blue Mountain State (2010)
- Mirador (2011)
- Black Cadillacs (2011)
- The Will (2012)
- Cosmopolis (2012)
- Claddagh (2012–2013)
- Fidelity (2013)
- Still Life: A Three Pines Mystery (2013)
- 30 vies (2013–2014)
- Trauma (2014)
- La théorie du K.O. (2014)
- Bully Fighters (2014)
- Gangland Undercover (2015)
- 2 femmes à Hollywood (2015)
- Anathema (2016)
- The Kindness of Strangers (2019)

== Awards ==
Patricia received a 2006 Gemini nomination for Best Supporting Actress in Charlie Jade.

Naked Josh was nominated for a 2006 Monte-Carlo Television Festival Award for Best Comedy Ensemble.
