= StarVaders =

2025 video game

- Developer: Pengonauts
- Publishers: Joystick Ventures, Playworks
- Designer: Eddie Cai
- Programmer: Hansen Liu
- Platforms: Windows, macOS
- Release: 30 April 2025
- Genre: Roguelike deckbuilder
- Mode: Single-player

StarVaders is a 2025 roguelike deckbuilder video game where players build and use a deck of cards to control a mech to fight enemies on a grid. The game was developed by Canadian indie studio Pengonauts, and released in April 2025 for Windows and macOS. The game received "generally favorable" reviews and was nominated for "Strategy/Simulation Game of the Year" at the 29th Annual D.I.C.E. Awards.

== Gameplay ==
The player's mech (the Gunner) along with several enemies on a grid.

StarVaders is a single-player, turn-based roguelike deckbuilder where players build and use a deck of cards to control a mech to fight enemies on a grid. Playing cards allows to move around the grid, shoot at enemies, and perform other actions. Cards produce heat when played, which fills a gauge over a turn. Completely filling the gauge causes the player to overheat, causing the player's turn to end and the played card to become unusable in the future. The player does not manage health in a traditional way; instead, taking damage adds useless cards to their deck.

In each round, enemies start at the top of the grid, and move downwards in a manner inspired by Space Invaders. After each round, the player receives a prize, which can include adding cards to their deck, upgrading cards already in their deck, and gaining artifacts that grant new powers.

There are three different mechs with different abilities, each with several pilots with different abilities. Different mechs use different resource systems: the Gunner's cards generate Heat when played, the Stinger uses Energy to play their cards, and the Keeper uses Mana. Pilots add cards, mechanics, and abilities on top of their mechs.

== Development and release ==
StarVaders was developed by Pengonauts, a Montreal, Canada based team including designer Eddie Cai and programmer Hansen Liu as their first commercial project. The developers cited Into the Breach as a influence on their design philosophy, and board games as the inspiration for many of the game's mechanics, in particular one named Bullet<3, and anime as an inspiration for the game's artstyle.

The game was published by Joystick Ventures and Playworks, and was released on 30 April 2025 on Steam for Windows and macOS. A Nintendo Switch port was announced in October 2025 with no confirmed release date.

== Reception ==
Reception

Aggregate scores
Aggregator	Score
Metacritic	NS: 85/100
OpenCritic	96% recommend

Review scores
Publication	Score
IGN France	7/10
Siliconera	8/10
Softpedia	8.5/10
The Games Machine	8.3/10

StarVaders received "generally positive" reviews according to review aggregation website Metacritic. 96% of reviewers recommended the game, according to OpenCritic.

Reviewers compared the gameplay to, and described StarVaders as a hybrid of, various other games, including Slay the Spire, Balatro, Into the Breach, and Mega Man Battle Network. Patricia Hernandez of Polygon complimented the gameplay loop and decisions presented to the player. Alessandro Alosi of The Games Machine described the game as more tactical and deeper than it appeared. Several commented positively on the amount and variety of content in the game, such as Videogamer's Tom Bardwell, who described it as a "deceptively addictive roguelike" with "deep replayability", and Inverse's Robin Bea, who commented on its replayability as "passed with flying colors". However, others criticized the complexity of the game's metaprogression, with IGN France's reviewer believing that the game became repetitive even before they unlocked all the available characters, and Suigiura Aono of 4Gamer criticizing how long they felt it took to unlock basic elements of the game.

Some commented that StarVaders did not bring new ideas to the roguelike deckbuilder genre, instead riffing off existing ideas. However, they did not see this as a limitation. For example, Bea commented: "None of that is too groundbreaking for a deckbuilder, even if the concept of slowly advancing invaders is cool, but it's remarkable how much strategic depth StarVaders wrings out of its setup." Aono opined that StarVaders successfully blended elements of multiple genres together with no filler.

Jenni Lada of Siliconera praised the juxtaposition of an end-of-the-world story with a "hopeful and vibrant" style. Some reviewers commented that the game lacked story or worldbuilding.

The Academy of Interactive Arts & Sciences nominated StarVaders for "Strategy/Simulation Game of the Year" at the 29th Annual D.I.C.E. Awards.
