= Robert William Genese =

Irish mathematician

Robert William Genese (1848, Dublin – 1928) was an Irish mathematician whose career was spent in Wales.

== Early life and education ==
Genese was born on Westland Row a street on the south side of Dublin on 8 May 1848. From St John's College of the University of Cambridge, Genese received in 1871 his bachelor's degree (with rank eighth Wrangler in the Tripos) and in 1874 his master's degree.

== Professional life ==
Following an unsuccessful application for the Chair of Mathematics at Aberystwyth in 1872, he taught at the Training College in Carmarthen. He finally secured the professorship at Aberystwyth in 1879, and held it until 1919. Along the way his title became Professor of Mathematics and Astronomy.

Genese introduced into the United Kingdom the ideas of Hermann Grassmann (advancing the use of vector analysis). In his 1941 book The calculus of extensions, Henry Forder published numerous examples in vector analysis taken from Genese's posthumous notes. (Genese's notes were left to the Mathematical Association and then given in 1929 to Forder by E. H. Neville.)

Genese was an Invited Speaker of the ICM in 1904 in Heidelberg with talk On some useful theorems in the continued multiplication of a regressive product in real four-point space and in 1908 in Rome with talk The method of reciprocal polars applied to forces in space.

== Selected publications ==
- "Suggestions for the Practical Treatment of the Standard Cubic Equation, and a Contribution to the Theory of Substitution." The Mathematical Gazette 9, no. 129 (1917): 65–69. doi:10.2307/3603498
- "On the Theory of the Plane Complex with Simple Geometrical and Kinematical Illustrations." The Mathematical Gazette 11, no. 164 (1923): 293–301. doi:10.2307/3603761
- "A Simple Exposition of Grassmann's Methods." The Mathematical Gazette 13, no. 189 (1927): 373–391. doi:10.2307/3604329
