= Genese Davis =

American novelist

- Education: University of Texas (BA)
- Occupations: Novelist, video game writer
- Writing career
- Genres: Fantasy, science fiction, video games, new adult
- Notable works: The Holder's Dominion, Hogwarts Legacy, Ary and the Secret of Seasons
- Website: genesedavis.com

Genese Davis is an American video game writer and novelist, best known for her writing for games including Omensight, Ary and the Secret of Seasons, and Hogwarts Legacy, and as the author of the novel The Holder's Dominion. Davis is also a speaker and writer about video game culture and its development within society.

== Biography ==
Davis grew up in Santa Fe, New Mexico. She attended the University of Texas, graduating with a Bachelor of Arts degree.

In 2013, Davis published her debut novel, The Holder's Dominion. A science fiction thriller about a female gamer fighting back against a malicious hacker who threatens the players of a massively multiplayer online game, the novel draws on Davis's experiences playing online games. Davis reportedly had trouble getting the book published due to its protagonist's gender, with two firms offering Davis publishing deals if she agreed to rewrite the book so the protagonist was a man; Davis declined these offers.

Davis was named the 2013 Woman of the Year by the "I Game Responsibly" staff for her positive promotion of video games and the video game industry.

In 2014, 2015 and 2016, Davis was a speaker at several Wizard World comic conventions, where she organized and participated in panel discussions.

== Works ==
=== Novel ===
- 2013, The Holder's Dominion, ISBN 978-1-592-98580-7

== Videography ==
Year	Title	Role(s)
2018	Omensight	Writer
2020	Ary and the Secret of Seasons	Lead writer, story and script
2020	Override 2: Super Mech League	Storywriting
2021	Rustler	Script editor
2023	Hogwarts Legacy	Senior writer
2024	Medic: Pacific War	Lead writer
TBA	Unforetold: Witchstone	Writing
