= Contrast (video game) =

2013 video game

- Developer: Compulsion Games (Note: Nvidia Lightspeed Studios developed the Nvidia Shield version.)
- Publisher: Focus Home Interactive (Note: Currently self-published)
- Director: Guillaume Provost
- Artist: Whitney Clayton
- Writer: Alex Epstein
- Composer: Nicolas Marquis
- Engine: Unreal Engine 3
- Platforms: Windows; PlayStation 3 PlayStation 4 Xbox 360; Xbox One
- Release: Windows, PS4, Xbox 360: NA: November 15, 2013; PAL: November 15, 2013; PAL: November 29, 2013 (PS4); PS3: NA: November 19, 2013; PAL: November 20, 2013; Xbox One: WW: June 26, 2014
- Genre: Puzzle-platform
- Mode: Single-player

Contrast is a puzzle-platform game developed by Compulsion Games for Microsoft Windows, PlayStation 3, PlayStation 4, Xbox 360, Xbox One, and Nvidia Shield.

== Gameplay ==
The game is set in a noir atmosphere aesthetically inspired by Belle Epoque and Art Nouveau. The player must solve puzzles that require movement between the physical world, which is represented as 3D, and shadows, which are represented as 2D. The player may sometimes manipulate different light sources in the 3D world (spotlights, film projectors, etc.) to create the shadow paths that reach into new areas; "collectibles", available through game-play, offer insight into the game's characters and the world in which they live. The goal of the game is exploration and discovery through problem solving.

Dawn and Didi are the two characters who appear as full 3D figures. The player controls Dawn, an imaginary friend, who is able to manifest as a three-dimensional shadow. Dawn is able to jump between two shadows, no matter how far apart they are. Almost all other characters appear as shadows against the visual walls, but they still interact with the world as though they are "real."

== Plot ==
The game opens with Didi's invisible friend Dawn entering her room before Didi's mother puts her to bed before the mother leaves for the evening to sing at a local nightclub. Didi sneaks out of her house to watch her mother's performance, and ends up eavesdropping on her father meeting her mother, telling her mother about his newest plan to strike it rich, which is to open a circus. Didi's mother is not convinced, and leaves while the father tells her his hotel room number. The father then goes to meet with his headlining performer, the great Vincenzo, who is reluctant to perform without money up front, and refuses to lend a film reel of his performance to Didi's father, who wants to show it to his investors as a way to convince them to continue providing funding for the circus. Didi and Dawn steal the film reel, and follow the father to the cinema where he is soon confronted by mafia members, who start beating him when he claims the projector for the film is not working, and that he needs more cash to convince Vincenzo. Dawn and Didi start the film in the projector, which impresses the two mob members enough to continue their funding for the circus. Didi's father then goes to his hotel to wait for his estranged wife, who in the ensuing confrontation is vehement that she will not take the father back into the family until Didi intervenes, at which point she reluctantly allows the father to return to their home.

Several days later, with the circus nearly ready to open, Didi and Dawn set out to meet Vincenzo, who in the previous confrontation between Didi's mother and father is revealed to be Didi's biological father. They overhear Vincenzo accosting Didi's father, pointing out how ill prepared the circus is, with several attractions either broken or missing actors. Dawn and Didi fix the circus acts, and then go to see Vincenzo in his workshop, where Vincenzo reveals that Didi was the result of an accidental pregnancy between him and Didi's mother, saying that he wasn't capable of caring for Didi with his work. Didi persists, saying that she's already shown herself to be capable of being his assistant after fixing the circus, but Vincenzo refuses, and after comforting a crying Didi, brings her back to her mother and father. His opening act is then started, but the light fixtures overload and the bulbs explode, leaving him unable to perform. Dawn and Didi then repair a lighthouse and use its light to allow Vincenzo to perform, whose act is a great success. Dawn and Didi then follow her parents backstage, and after Didi's father says that he is clearly incapable of providing after there were so many malfunctions in all of his schemes and that Vincenzo should take Didi in, Vincenzo and Didi's mother rebukes him, Vincenzo pointing out that he is clearly suited, having risked his life to be with Didi, whereas Vincenzo has not done nearly as much for her. The game ends with Didi's family formally reuniting, and Vincenzo offering to let Didi see his workshop again, remarking that even if he didn't bring Didi on his upcoming world tour, she'd probably still find a way on her own steam. The game closes with Vincenzo directly displaying the same power that Dawn has, physically appearing in the game's shadow world next to Dawn and Didi, and thanking Dawn for looking after Didi, and remarking to Dawn that "It's been a long time, hasn't it?"

Through in game collectibles, it is revealed that Dawn and Vincenzo were originally a pair of illusionists from an alternate dimension, with Vincenzo building upon the work of Einstein to create his devices that allow him to manipulate reality. It is left unknown why Dawn has been left more permanently tied to this shadow world.

== Reception ==
Reception

Aggregate score
Aggregator	Score
Metacritic	(PC) 62/100 (PS4) 59/100 (X360) 65/100

Review scores
Publication	Score
GameSpot	5/10
IGN	7.5/10
VentureBeat	55/100

Contrast received mixed reviews upon its release. On Metacritic, the Xbox 360 version of the game got a score of 65/100, the PC computer version a 62/100, and the PlayStation 4 version a 59/100. Dan Stapleton of IGN gave the game a 7.5, praising the gameplay and the puzzles. He said, "Contrast is a game full of heart, beauty, and at least a few excellent puzzles." Carolyn Petit of GameSpot gave the game a score of 5.0, complimenting the atmosphere of the game but criticizing the gameplay and the puzzles. VentureBeat's McKinley Noble gave Contrast a 55 out of 100 score, stating that while he liked the overall concept, it suffered from overly "glitchy" gameplay and "lifeless" environments.
