= Compulsion Games =

Canadian video game developer

Compulsion Games Inc.
- Type: Private
- Industry: Video games
- Founded: 2009; 17 years ago
- Founder: Guillaume Provost
- Headquarters: Westmount, Montreal, Canada
- Key people: Guillaume Provost (studio head); Whitney Clayton (art director)
- Products: Contrast; We Happy Few; South of Midnight
- Number of employees: 80 (2021)
- Parent: Xbox Game Studios (2018–2026)
- Website: compulsiongames.com

Compulsion Games Inc. is a Canadian video game developer based in Montreal. Established in 2009 by ex-Arkane Studios developer Guillaume Provost, the studio developed the 2013 puzzle-platform game Contrast, the 2018 survival horror game We Happy Few and the 2025 action-adventure game South of Midnight.

== History ==
Compulsion Games was founded in Montreal in 2009 by Guillaume Provost, who had previously worked for Arkane Studios. To raise funds for its first game, the team of Compulsion Games worked on external projects, including Darksiders, Dungeons & Dragons: Daggerdale, and Arthur Christmas: Elf Run.

In November 2013, Compulsion Games released the puzzle-platform game Contrast for Windows, PlayStation 4, PlayStation 3, and Xbox 360. By January 2014, the game had sold more than one million copies. The Xbox One version was eventually released in June 2014.

In February 2015, the company announced We Happy Few as its next game. Debuting at PAX East 2015, it received unprecedented hype, which the studio struggled to control. Receiving comparisons to BioShock, the team decided to pivot from the survival mechanics it initially envisioned to a more narrative-based game. In June, Compulsion launched a Kickstarter campaign to fund development, which ultimately exceeded its goal. Microsoft then showcased the game at E3 2016.

The game launched in Early Access on PC and Xbox in July 2016. By the summer of 2017, Compulsion had 40 people working on the game and a publishing deal with Gearbox Publishing. We Happy Few was given an April 2018 release date. However, by January 2018, it was delayed so Compulsion could rework the first few hours of the game.

At E3 2018, Microsoft announced it had acquired Compulsion Games, which would become part of Microsoft Studios (now known as Xbox Game Studios). We Happy Few was finally released in August. Critics praised its aesthetic, art direction, and narrative, but were more mixed about the actual gameplay.

In 2019, after finishing the DLC for We Happy Few, Compulsion began work on its next game. By October 2021, the studio had further doubled its staff and was working on a narrative, third-person perspective game. It would avoid some missteps from We Happy Few, such as using roguelike elements or an early access approach.

South of Midnight was revealed at a June 2023 Xbox Showcase, a third-person action-adventure game set in a magical version of the American South. In January 2025, Microsoft revealed an April release date for Xbox Series X and S, PC, and Game Pass.

In June 2026, it was reported by Kotaku that the Xbox division was preparing to close Compulsion Games as part of their division-wide layoffs expected to take place following Microsoft's current fiscal year. In the preceding weeks, numerous developers from the studio were reported to have disclosed their availability for work on sites such as LinkedIn, suggesting their dismissal from Xbox. Jason Schreier of Bloomberg News reported that multiple studios at Xbox Game Studios, including Compulsion Games, were in negotiations for independent buyouts and separation from the division to avoid being shuttered.

On July 6, 2026, Compulsion released a statement confirming its split from Xbox and return to being an independent studio. On August 11, the studio had completed a management buyout from Microsoft, including gaining all rights to its intellectual properties.

== Games developed ==
| Year | Title | Platform(s) | Publisher |
|---|---|---|---|
| 2013 | Contrast | Microsoft Windows, PlayStation 4, PlayStation 3, Xbox One, Xbox 360 | Focus Entertainment |
| 2018 | We Happy Few | Microsoft Windows, PlayStation 4, Xbox One | Gearbox Publishing |
| 2025 | South of Midnight | Microsoft Windows, Xbox Series X/S, Nintendo Switch 2, PlayStation 5 | Xbox Game Studios |
