= Hollywood Music in Media Award for Best Original Song in a Video Game =

Annual American music award category

The Hollywood Music in Media Award for Best Original Song in a Video Game is one of the awards given annually to people working in the entertainment industry by the Hollywood Music in Media Awards (HMMA). It is presented to the songwriters who have composed the best "original" song, written specifically for video game. The award was first given in 2014, during the fifth annual awards.

== Winners and nominees ==
=== 2010s ===
Year	Video Game	Song	Nominees	Company
(2014); 5th
(2014); 5th	LittleBigPlanet 3	"Ziggurat Theme"	Winifred Phillips	SCE
(2014); 5th	Lords of the Fallen	"Winter's Kiss"	Knut Avenstroup Haugen	Bandai Namco
(2014); 5th	Planetary Annihilation	"Destiny Into Darkness"	Howard Mostrom	Planetary Annihilation Inc
(2015); 6th
(2015); 6th	Destiny	"Hope for the Future"	Paul McCartney	Activision
(2015); 6th	Assassin's Creed Syndicate	"Underground"	Tripod, Austin Wintory	Ubisoft
(2015); 6th	Juju	"This is the Credits Song"	Adam Skorupa	Flying Wild Hog
(2015); 6th	Sword Coast Legends	"The Path of Destiny"	Inon Zur, Ian Nickus, Mimi Page	Digital Extremes
(2015); 6th	The Vanishing of Ethan Carter	"Valley of the Blinding Mist"	Mikolai Stroinski, Kyler England	The Astronauts
(2017); 8th
(2017); 8th	Moonlight Blade OL	"Ocean Over the Time"	Thomas Parisch	
(2017); 8th	Dead Rising 4	"Oh Willamette"	Oleksa Lozowchuk	Microsoft Studios/Capcom
(2017); 8th	Expeditions: Viking	"Homestead"	Knut Avenstroup Haugen	Logic Artists
(2018); 9th
(2018); 9th	The Banner Saga 3	"Only We Few Remember it Now"	Austin Wintory (writer), Eivør (performer)	Versus Evil
(2018); 9th	Astro Bot Rescue Mission	"A Fire In Your Mind"	Kenneth C. M. Young (writer/performer)	SIE
(2018); 9th	Forgotton Anne	"Forgotten Anne"	Randi Laubek (writer/performer)	Square Enix Collective/Hitcents
(2018); 9th	Super NBA	"All Star"	Satta (writer/performer), Jason Walsh (music)	Tecmo
(2018); 9th	World of Warcraft: Battle for Azeroth	"Warbringers: Jaina"	Neal Acree, Logan Laflotte (writers); Laura Bailey (performer)	Blizzard
(2019); 10th
(2019); 10th	Resident Evil 2	"Saudade"	Cody Matthew Johnson, Shim (writers/performers)	Capcom
(2019); 10th	Days Gone	"Hell or High Water"	Billy Raffoul (writer/performer)	SIE
(2019); 10th	Devil May Cry 5	"Devil Trigger"	Casey Edwards (writer); Ali Edwards, Cliff Lloret (performers)	Capcom
(2019); 10th	Erica	"Aria for Delphi"	Austin Wintory, Jim Fowler (writers); Laura Intravia (performers)	SIE
(2019); 10th	Red Dead Redemption 2	"That’s The Way It Is"	Daniel Lanois (writer/performer)	Rockstar Games

=== 2020s ===
Year	Video Game	Song	Nominees	Company
(2020); 11th
(2020); 11th	League of Legends	"The Baddest"	Riot Music Team and Bekuh BOOM; Performed by Soyeon of (G)I-DLE, Miyeon of (G)I-DLE, Bea Miller, and Wolftyla	Riot Games
(2020); 11th	Hades	"In the Blood"	Written by Darren Korb; Performed by Darren Korb and Ashley Barrett	Supergiant Games
(2020); 11th	Baldur's Gate 3	"Weeping Dawn"	Written by Borislav Slavov; Performed by Vesela Delcheva and Budapest Studio Orchestra	Larian Studios
(2020); 11th	Arknights	"Renegade"	Written by Jason Walsh; Performed by Substantial and X.ARI	Hypergryph
(2020); 11th	Marvel's Spider-Man: Miles Morales	"I'm Ready"	Written by Jaden Smith, Josiah Bell, Omarr Rambert, and Alex Hackford; Performed by Jaden Smith	Insomniac Games
(2020); 11th	Ghost of Tsushima	"The Way of the Ghost"	Written by Ilan Eshkeri and Jenny Plant; Performed by Clare Uchima	Sucker Punch Productions
(2020); 11th	Death Stranding	"BB's Theme"	Written by Ludvig Forssell; Performed by Jenny Plant	Kojima Productions
(2021); 12th
(2021); 12th	League of Legends	"Burn It All Down"	Riot Music Team and Alex Seaver of Mako; Performed by PVRIS	Riot Games
(2021); 12th	Quantaar	"Limitless" (feat. Matilda Stray and Omega Sparx)"	Written by Emperia Sound, Cody Matthew Johnson and Voicians; Performed by Matilda Stray and Omega Sparx	Pumpkin VR
(2021); 12th	Baldur's Gate 3	"I Want to Live"	Written by Borislav Slavov; Performed by Borislav Slavov and Ilona Ivanova	Larian Studios
(2021); 12th	Eve Echoes	"Infinity"	Written by Jared Benson; Performed by Tahira Schäfer, Hannes Porombka, Leon Würschinger, Frederic Michel, Jacob StocK	CCP Games
(2021); 12th	Deathloop	"Déjà Vu"	Written and performed by Sencit featuring FJØRA	Arkane Studios
(2021); 12th	Life Is Strange: True Colors	"In the Darkness"	Written and performed by mxmtoon	Deck Nine
(2022); 13th
(2022); 13th	God of War Ragnarök	"Blood Upon the Snow"	Written and performed by Hozier and Bear McCreary	Santa Monica Studio
(2022); 13th	Quantaar	"Clarity"	Written by Cody Matthew Johnson, dorsia, Matilda Stray, and Alec Justice; Performed by Matthew Cody Johnson and dorsia	Pumpkin VR
(2022); 13th	CHORVS	"Chorus Main Theme"	Written by Pedro Macedo Camacho; Performed by Úyanga Bold	Fishlabs
(2022); 13th	Gran Turismo 7	"Vroom"	Written and performed by The FaNaTiX, Idris Elba, Lil Tjay, Davido, Koffee, and Moelogo	Polyphony Digital
(2022); 13th	League of Legends	"Rebirth"	Written by EJAE and Matthew Carl Earl; Performed by EJAE	Riot Games
(2023); 14th
(2023); 14th	Marvel's Spider-Man 2	"Swing"	Written by Dernst "D'Mile" Emile II, Eian Parker, Ian Welch, and Olu Fann; Performed by Benji and EARTHGANG	Insomniac Games
(2023); 14th	Blacktail	"Blacktail"	Composed by Arkadiusz Reikowski. With performances by Robot Koch, Zazula Vocal Group, Bartosz Pałyga, and CZELUSC Collective	The Parasight
(2023); 14th	Just Dance 2024	"After Party (Just Dance)"	Written by Clément Langlois-Légaré, Yannick Rastogi, Zacharie Morier-Gxoyiya, and Zacharie Raymond; Performed by Banx & Ranx and Zack Zoya	Ubisoft
(2023); 14th	Rocksmith+	"Glow in the Dark"	Written by Alna Hofmeyr, Maize Olinger, McKenzie Ellis, and Nick Sadler; Performed by MOTHICA	Ubisoft
(2023); 14th	The World 3	"Ballad of Dreams Past"	Written by Zhou Guoyi; Performed by Erjun June and Miao Gongjiang	Good Games
(2023); 14th	Tournament of Souls	"Coming Alive"	Written by Brendon Williams, Corben Nikk Bowen, Emanuel Williams, Jason Walsh, and Konrad Abramowicz; Performed by League of Legends and Vo Williams	Riot Games
(2024); 15th
(2024); 15th	Avatar: Frontiers of Pandora	"The People's Cry (Main Theme)"	Written by Pinar Toprak and Paul R Frommer	Massive Entertainment
(2024); 15th	Delta Force	"Dawn""ETERNITY"	"Dawn" Written by Jesse David/Harrison Boyd/Kiegan Jone; Performed by Delta Force/Lithium Done; "ETERNITY" Written by Kelly Zhong (SBMS) /BFLo (SBMS), Raymond Hsu (SBMS), Kelly Zhong (SBMS), BFLo (SBMS)	Team Jade
(2024); 15th	Once Human	"Careless Paradise"	Written by Juju Xu/Elsbeth Rehder/hou. Performed by Juju Xu/Elsbeth Rehder	Starry Studio
(2024); 15th	Potionomics: Masterwork Edition	"She Had Allies"	Written by Greg Nicolett; Performed by Caitlyn Elizabeth	Voracious Games
(2024); 15th	Star Wars Outlaws	"The Cantina Can't Contain Us"	Written by Cody Mathew Johnson; Featuring Ya-Ya Melodies	Massive Entertainment
(2025); 16th
(2025); 16th	Wuthering Waves	"Against the Tide"	Written by Obadiah Brown-Beach; Performed by Forts and Obadiah Brown-Beach	Kuro Games
(2025); 16th	Hades II	"Coral Crown"	Written by Darren Korb; Performed by Scylla and the Sirens	Supergiant Games
(2025); 16th	Rue Vally	"Footsteps"	Written and performed by Ana Krstajić	Emotion Spark Studio
(2025); 16th	Marvel Rivals	"Rivals 'Til the End"	Written by Danny Koo, Marbling, Netease Sound, Masahiro Aoki, H.K.H; Vocals by Chrissy Costanza	NetEase Games
(2025); 16th	The Rogue Prince of Persia	"The Rogue Prince of Persia"	Written and performed by Daniel Asadi and XYE	Evil Empire
(2025); 16th	Dune: Awakening	"When the Sun Is Low"	Written by Knut Avenstroup Haugen; Performed by Clara Sorace, The Chamber Orchestra of London, Børre Flyen and Knut Avenstroup Haugen	Funcom
(2026); 17th
(2026); 17th	007 First Light	"First Light"	Written by Lana Del Rey and David Arnold; Performed by Lana Del Rey	IO Interactive
(2026); 17th	Delta Force	"Lone Survivor"	Written by Jules Mathieu and Melqui Alvarez; Performed by Delta Force and Blaze Johnson Jr.	Team Jade
(2026); 17th	Europa Universalis V	"Pain in Salvation"	Written by Håkan Glänte; Performed by Norrköping Symphony Orchestra, Goteborg Baroque and The Gothenburg Symphony Vocal Ensemble	Paradox Interactive
(2026); 17th	League of Legends	"Salvation"	Written by J.D. Spears and Mary Clare Clemons; Performed by Mary Clare Clemons	Riot Games
(2026); 17th	Marvel Rivals	"Shining Star	Written by Nao and Danny Koo; Performed by Chrissy Costanza	NetEase Games
(2026); 17th	Marvel's Wolverine	"The Wanderer"	Written and performed by Hudson Freeman and David Fleming	Insomniac Games
(2026); 17th	Wuthering Waves	"Voyaging Star's Farewell"	Written by Jixwang and Xulai; Performed by Tarokiki with featuring vocals by Emi Evans	Kuro Games

== See also ==
- Academy Award for Best Original Song
