= Laura Intravia =

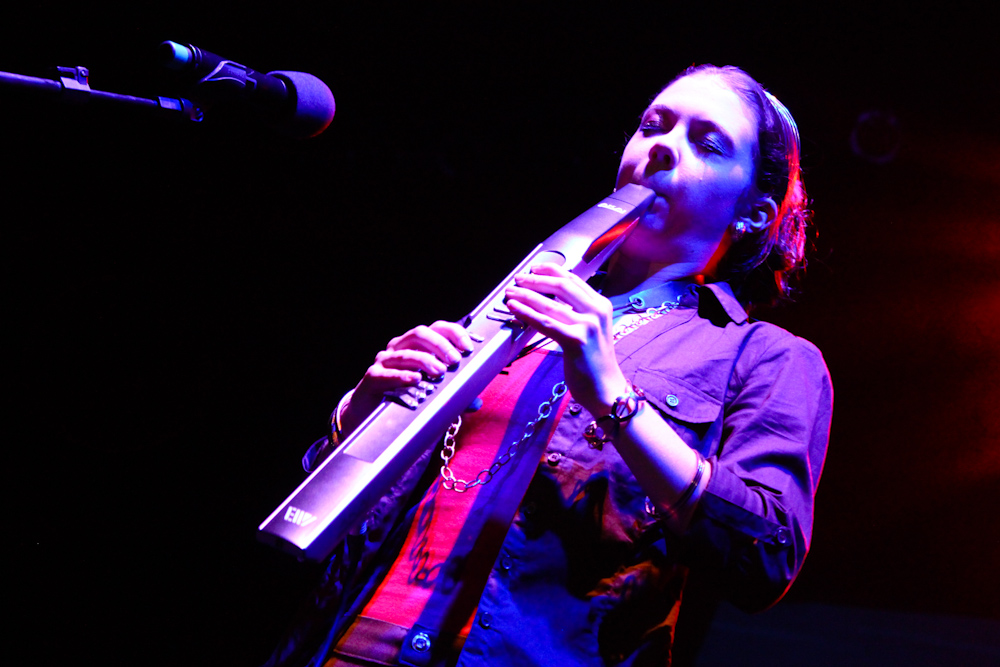
- Laura Intravia

Background information
- Genre: Video Game Music
- Occupations: Musician, Vocalist, Composer
- Instruments: Voice, Flute, EWI
- Website: https://lauraintravia.com

Laura Intravia, also known as Flute Link, is an American instrumentalist, vocalist, and composer. She is best known for her performances on video game soundtracks and for concerts featuring video game music.

== Career ==
Intravia began performing as an instrumental and vocal soloist for Video Games Live in 2009. She appeared on the Video Games Live televised PBS Special, performing on the "Chrono Trigger/Chrono Cross Medley," which was released on the accompanying album Video Games Live: Level 2. She also appeared on Level 3,, Level 4 and Level 5 as an arranger, solo instrumentalist and vocalist.

In 2013, Intravia was one of the artists featured on Austin Wintory's album of remixed music from the stealth game Monaco: What's Yours is Mine. The album was released in conjunction with the game and OST. In the same year, she arranged music from Journey for a piano sheet music book, published by Alfred Music Publishing. She later appeared as a guest vocalist for the accompanying recorded piano album with pianist Robert Thies.

In 2014, Intravia performed as a solo vocalist at the world premiere of the new concert series Pokémon: Symphonic Evolutions, an official Pokémon project produced by Princeton Entertainment. The concert series debuted in Washington D.C., featuring Junichi Masuda as a guest conductor. She performed again the following month at the Mann Center.

Intravia arranged Through Time and Space, a Chrono Trigger and Chrono Cross piano arrangement album in 2015, featuring pianist Brendon Shapiro. The album was produced by Tommy Tallarico and released in conjunction with the Video Games Live: Level 4 Kickstarter. In 2016, Intravia's second album Shall We Play? featuring music from The Legend of Zelda: Majora's Mask was released.

In 2018, Intravia performed and co-wrote the ending song of the point-and-click adventure game Arkhangel: The House of the Seven Stars with lead composer Chad Seiter. In 2025, she collaborated with AURORA and composer Brendon Williams to co-write "A Place to Call Home" for World of Warcraft: Midnight.

== Video games ==
- World of Warcraft: Midnight (2025): co-composer, lyricist
- Mobile Legends: Bang Bang (2021): vocalist, lyricist
- Spirit Oath (2020): vocalist
- Arknights (2019): vocalist
- Erica (2019): vocalist
- Mortal Kombat 11 (2019): vocalist
- Code Vein (2019): vocalist
- Mages of Mystralia (2019): flutist
- Sole (2019): flutist
- Darksiders III (2018): vocalist
- God Eater 3 (2018): vocalist
- Arkhangel: The House of the Seven Stars (2018): additional composition, lyricist, vocalist
- Tin Hearts (2018): performer
- THE IDOLM@STER CINDERELLA MASTER (2018): vocalist
- Destiny 2 (2017): vocalist
- Mages of Mystralia (2017): flutist
- ReCore (2016): vocalist
- Destiny: The Taken King (2015): vocalist
- Dungeonmans (2014): flutist
- Dragonvale (2013): flutist, recorder

== Film/TV ==
- Los Angeles (2021): vocalist
- Scott The Woz (2021): flutist
- Tread (2020): vocalist
- Get the Girl (2017): vocalist

== Discography ==
| Year | Album | Role | Notes |
|---|---|---|---|
| 2010 | Video Games Live: Level 2 | Flutist | #8 Billboard Top-Ten |
| 2012 | Time's End: Majora's Mask Remixed | Vocalist, flute | |
| 2013 | MONACO: The Gentleman's Private Collection | Arranger, flute | |
| 2013 | Final Fantasy VI: Balance and Ruin | Vocalist, flute | |
| 2013 | In Endless Song | Flute | |
| 2014 | Video Games Live: Level 3 | Arranger, flute, vocals | |
| 2014 | Transfiguration | Arranger, vocals | |
| 2014 | Color Me Blue | Flute | |
| 2014 | Goddess | Vocals | |
| 2015 | Video Games Live: Level 4 | Arranger, vocals, flute | |
| 2015 | Through Time and Space | Arranger, vocals | |
| 2016 | Video Games Live: Level 5 | Arranger, vocals, flute | |
| 2017 | Project Destati: Darkness | Vocals | |
| 2017 | The Celtic Link | Vocals | |
| 2017 | Hero of Time | Flute | |
| 2018 | Project Destati: Darkness | Vocals | |
| 2018 | Johto Legends | Flute | |
| 2019 | Exile: A Tribute to Supergiant Games | Vocals, flute | |
| 2019 | Resurrection of the Night: Alucard's Elegy | Flute | |
| 2019 | Parallelus | Flute | |
| 2020 | Hang on to Your Hat | Arranger | |
| 2020 | Brassino Isles Tropical Cruise | Flute | |
