= Lone Echo =

Virtual reality adventure game

- Developer: Ready At Dawn
- Publisher: Oculus Studios
- Directors: Ru Weerasuriya; Dana Jan
- Producer: Ru Weerasuriya
- Programmer: Jacob Copenhaver
- Artist: Nathan Phail-Liff
- Writers: Ru Weerasuriya; David Dunne; Cory Lanham
- Composer: Jason Graves
- Platforms: Oculus Rift, Oculus Rift S
- Release: July 20, 2017
- Genre: Adventure
- Mode: Single-player

Lone Echo is a 2017 virtual reality adventure game developed by Ready At Dawn, and published by Oculus Studios. Set aboard a space station orbiting Saturn, it allows players to move in zero-gravity by grabbing and pushing off of the environment. In addition to the narrative single-player game, the title includes a team-based multiplayer sports mode called Echo Arena, which was then taken out of Lone Echo, and released as a stand-alone game. A sequel, Lone Echo II, was announced in 2018 and released on October 12, 2021.

== Gameplay ==
Lone Echo is a narrative adventure game consisting of both exploration and using tools and objects to solve puzzles. Of particular note is the game's locomotion system, which allows players to grab almost any surface, and either move themselves along or push off of the environment to float in a given direction. The player is also given wrist-mounted thrusters that can be used to change or finesse a trajectory.

Players can pick up and move objects, as well as manipulate switches and control panels. In addition they are given a data scanner that can interface with machinery, and a plasma cutter than can cut through certain surfaces. As a service android, the player must repair damaged or inoperable systems, as well as aid and protect the station's sole human crew member, with whom they interact using dialogue trees.

== Plot ==
Jack rescuing Olivia by using his 'reactive cutter' to free her foot after it got stuck in some of the machinery

Set in the year 2126, Lone Echo casts players in the role of an "ECHO ONE" service android nicknamed "Jack", aboard the Kronos II mining station orbiting Saturn. Jack serves under the command of the human crew member Captain Olivia Rhodes, who is to be reassigned by her employer "The Atlas Initiative", leaving Jack behind as the sole crew member of the facility. When a mysterious spatial anomaly knocks out some of the station's vital systems, Jack and Olivia work together to repair the damage and investigate the mysterious phenomenon.

While the two investigate the anomaly, a massive unidentified ship appears and Kronos II is destroyed by flying debris. When Jack reawakens after being temporarily decommissioned, he notices that Olivia is no longer on or around the station. In a message left in an emergency beacon, Olivia states that she had to abandon the facility due to power failures and loss of life support, and that she would take her chances aboard the unknown vessel. Jack follows her to the ship to find out if she's still alive.

On the way, Jack discovers a mysterious biomass formation that seems to be activated by nearby electrical currents and which absorbs anything that it touches while active. While travelling inside the unknown vessel, Jack encounters the ship's AI named Apollo, who needs Jack's help to repair some of the ship's functions and reawaken the ship's crew. Apollo explains that the ship, named the Astrea, was attacked and that the biomass spreading throughout the ship is a biological weapon used by the attackers. When Jack releases the crew from their stasis pods, he discovers that they are all human and members of the Atlas Initiative. However, all the crew members are deceased, and Apollo informs Jack that, according to his records, Olivia Rhodes disappeared over 400 years ago, in 2126, and suggests that Jack is malfunctioning. Jack is certain that Olivia is still alive and somewhere in the ship, and convinces Apollo to help him. Eventually, with Apollo's help, Jack finds Olivia in the ship. Apollo recognizes Olivia as a member of the Atlas Initiative and promotes her as the new captain of the Astrea. Apollo concludes that the ship must have made a time jump that caused Olivia's disappearance in his timeline.

Jack and Olivia try to repair the ship's life support systems as Olivia's oxygen starts to run low, but eventually fail to pressurize their location due to many structural failures on the ship. They retreat to bridge, the strongest part of the ship, and try to repair the life support there. However, before Jack succeeds in repairing the systems, Olivia's oxygen reserves run out and she goes into a cardiac arrest. Jack uses a defibrillator until Olivia starts breathing again.

In the final event, the ship's reactor destabilizes and threatens to destroy the entire ship. Apollo suggests they attempt a faster than light jump to expend a large amount of energy that could stabilize the reactor. This could, however, lead to the ship making another time jump. With no other choice, Jack and Olivia prepare the ship for the FTL jump by destroying non-essential power systems and finally activate the FTL drive. After the jump, they find out that they are still in an orbit around Saturn, but 400 years in the future. Outside they see the aftermath of a battle that the Astrea was involved in before jumping back in time. A friendly rescue vessel contacts the Astrea and states that help is underway.

== Development and release ==
Development began in 2015, when the first prototypes of the Oculus Touch were made available to developers. A small team created VR prototypes, while Ready At Dawn was finishing The Order: 1886. Inspired by footage of astronauts moving aboard the International Space Station, the team completed a demo weeks after receiving Oculus Touch development kits. After demonstrating an early prototype showcasing the locomotion system, Oculus came on board as publisher to produce a full game. The team was expanded to 15 people, and eventually grew to 60 at its peak.

About a year into its development, Ready At Dawn held an internal game jam, which resulted in an early prototype of Echo Arena. The decision was made to split the team, and develop both Lone Echo and Echo Arena alongside each other.

Lone Echo was released on July 20, 2017. This release included both the single-player Lone Echo and the multi-player Echo Arena. A separate, stand-alone version of Echo Arena with no single-player was also released on the same day. As the result of a partnership with Intel, Echo Arena could be redeemed for free to anyone with an Oculus Home account for the first three months of its release.

== Echo VR ==
A multi-player component for the game was included with the game's release, but also made available as a stand-alone release, titled Echo Arena. Later, Echo Arena would be expanded, adding several other game modes, turning into what came to be called Echo VR, Echo Arena remaining as the name of one of these modes.

As the result of a partnership with Intel, Echo Arena was offered for free to anyone who redeemed it within the first three months of launch. Echo Arena was a team-based sports game, based around the locomotion mechanics of Lone Echo. Players compete in an arena to grab a flying disc and throw it through the opposition's goal. Players can grab onto other players and punch opposing players in the head to stun them, making it a full-contact sport. There are several leagues for Echo Arena, including a Master League which included a prize pool of $250,000 in its 3rd season. Anyone can form a team to compete in this league as long as it follows the guidelines set in place by the event organizers. On March 9, an Echo Pass was added, allowing greater chassis and color customization and a tier system similar to those in battle royales, including a premium pass allowing for more rewards for 1000 Echo Points ($10). The update also added player banners, a personal banner that can be customized with a variety of patterns, colors, and symbols. Arena was available on the Oculus Quest (1 and 2) and Rift Platforms, with Echo Combat, the first person shooter, only being available on Oculus Rift or a Quest via Link or Air Link.

On January 31, 2023, Ready At Dawn announced the shutdown of Echo VR on August 1, 2023, citing work on their "next project" as a reason for the shutdown. Following the announcement, a petition on Change.org was made to "Save Echo VR". On February 28, 2023, the group who created the petition flew a sky banner over Meta headquarters urging CEO Mark Zuckerberg not to shut down the game. Despite this, the shutdown occurred with matchmaking going offline at 10am PST and 20 minutes later all players being disconnected.

== Reception ==
Reception

Aggregate score
Aggregator	Score
Metacritic	89/100

Review scores
Publication	Score
Adventure Gamers	4.5/5
IGN	8.9/10
Road to VR	9/10
UploadVR	8.5/10

Prior to its launch, Lone Echo won the Game Critics Award for Best VR Game at E3 2017.

Upon its release, Lone Echo received positive reviews. As of August 4, 2017 it had an average score of 89 on review aggregator Metacritic, indicating "generally favorable reviews". UploadVR awarded the title an 8.5/10, calling it "a landmark achievement in three key areas of the VR experience: locomotion, UI, and interaction," but criticized the game's deliberate pacing and abrupt ending. In his review, GameCrate's Leo Parrill called it "one of the best VR experiences I've had the opportunity to enjoy," while noting the presence of some frustrating bugs and glitches. Road to VR awarded the game a 9/10, with particular praise given to the storytelling and the relationship between Jack and Olivia.

Lone Echo was nominated for "Best VR/AR Game" at The Game Awards 2017, for "Best VR Game" at Destructoid's Game of the Year Awards 2017, and for "Best VR Experience" at IGN's Best of 2017 Awards. Polygon ranked it 18th on their list of the 50 best games of 2017. UploadVR awarded it Best Oculus Rift Game, Best Multiplayer VR Game, and Best Overall VR game for 2017. In naming Lone Echo "Game of the Year" on the Oculus Rift platform for 2017, Road to VR said the character of Olivia Rhodes was "the star of the show" and lauded how she believably relates to the player as a "living, breathing, ball-busting starship captain" in the immersive VR environment. The game was also nominated for "Best VR/AR Game" at the 18th Annual Game Developers Choice Awards. The Academy of Interactive Arts & Sciences awarded Lone Echo with "Immersive Reality Technical Achievement" and "Immersive Reality Game of the Year" at the 21st Annual D.I.C.E. Awards; it also received a nomination for "Outstanding Technical Achievement". In addition, it was nominated for "Direction in Virtual Reality" and "Sound Mixing in Virtual Reality" at the 17th Annual National Academy of Video Game Trade Reviewers Awards, and for "Best Use of Augmented Reality" at the 2018 Webby Awards. It also won the award for "Best Emotional VR Game" at the Emotional Games Awards 2018.
