= 25th Annual D.I.C.E. Awards =

2022 video game award ceremony

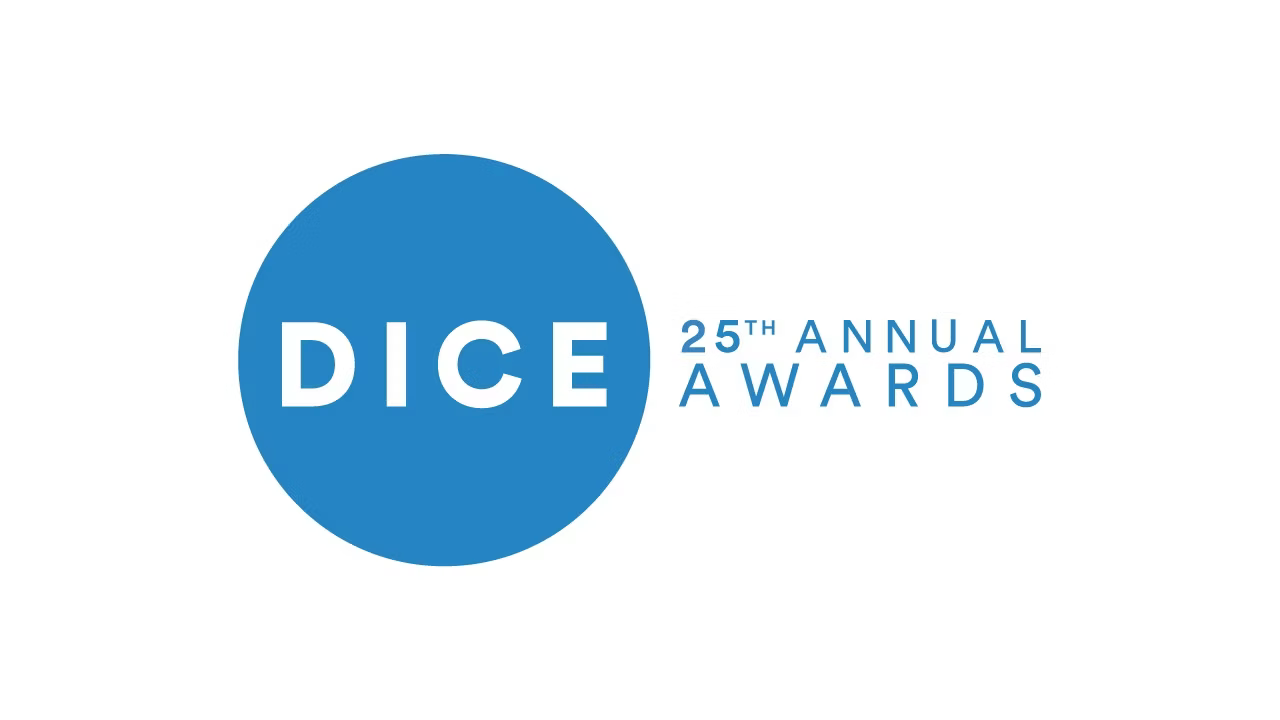
- Date: February 24, 2022
- Hosted by: Jessica Chobot and Greg Miller

Highlights
- Most awards: Ratchet & Clank: Rift Apart (4)
- Most nominations: Ratchet & Clank: Rift Apart (9)
- Game of the Year: It Takes Two
- Hall of Fame: Ed Boon
- Lifetime Achievement: Phil Spencer

The 25th Annual D.I.C.E. Awards was the 25th edition of the D.I.C.E. Awards ("Design Innovate Communicate Entertain"), an annual awards event that honored the best games in the video game industry during 2021. The awards were arranged by the Academy of Interactive Arts & Sciences (AIAS). The nominees were announced on January 13, 2022. It was also held as part of the Academy's 2022 D.I.C.E. Summit, and was co-hosted by Jessica Chobot of Nerdist News, and Kinda Funny co-founder Greg Miller. The winners were announced in a ceremony at the Mandalay Bay Resort in Las Vegas on February 24, 2022.

Ratchet & Clank: Rift Apart received the most nominations, and won the most awards, while It Takes Two won "Game of the Year". Sony Interactive Entertainment was the most nominated and award-winning publisher with Insomniac Games as the most nominated and award-winning developer. Electronic Arts and Nintendo had the most nominated games while Xbox Game Studios had the most award-winning games.

Ed Boon, co-creator of the Mortal Kombat franchise, was inducted into the Academy's Hall of Fame. Phil Spencer, CEO of Microsoft Gaming and head of Xbox Game Studios, received the "Lifetime Achievement Award".

== Winners and Nominees ==
Winners are listed first, highlighted in boldface, and indicated with a double dagger (‡).

=== Game of the Year awards ===
**Game of the Year**: **It Takes Two (Hazelight Studios, Electronic Arts) — Josef Fares, Aimar Bergan**‡; Deathloop (Arkane Studios, Bethesda Softworks) — Dinga Bakaba; Inscryption (Daniel Mullins Games, Devolver Digital) — Daniel Mullins; Ratchet & Clank: Rift Apart (Insomniac Games, Sony Interactive Entertainment) — Marcus Smith, Mike Daly, Peter Chan; Returnal (Housemarque, Sony Interactive Entertainment) — Gregory Louden, Harri Tikannen, Harry Krueger	**Online Game of the Year**: **Halo Infinite (343 Industries, Xbox Game Studios) — Tom French, Andrew Witts, Fernando Reyes Medina, Patrick Wren, Alex Bean, Zach Boyce, Mickey Cushing, Cayle George, Adrian Bedoya, Tyler Ensrude, Cliff Schuldt**‡; Back 4 Blood (Turtle Rock Studios, Warner Bros. Interactive Entertainment) — Brandon Yanez, Steve Goldstein, Wes Macdonald; Call of Duty: Vanguard (Sledgehammer Games, Activision) — Greg Reisdorf, Adam Iscove, Zach Hodson; Final Fantasy XIV: Endwalker (Square Enix) — Naoki Yoshida; Knockout City (Velan Studios, Electronic Arts) — Jeremy Russo, Douglas Applewhite, Joe Morton
**Mobile Game of the Year**: **Pokémon Unite (TiMi Studios, The Pokémon Company) — Masaaki Hoshino**‡; Behind the Frame (Silver Lining Studio, Akupara Games, Akatsuki Taiwan) — Weichen Lin; Fantasian (Mistwalker, Apple) — Hironobu Sakaguchi, Takuto Nakamura; League of Legends: Wild Rift (Riot Games) — Michael Chow, Alan Moore; Moncage (Optillusion, XD) — Dong Zhou, Yijia Chen	**Outstanding Achievement for an Independent Game**: **Unpacking (Witch Beam, Humble Bundle) — Tim Dawson, Wren Brier, Jeff van Dyck**‡; Death's Door (Acid Nerve, Devolver Digital) — Mark Foster, David Fenn; Inscryption (Daniel Mullins Games, Devolver Digital) — Daniel Mullins; Loop Hero (Four Quarters, Devolver Digital) — Aleksandr Goreslavets, Dmitry Karimov, Aleksandr Vartazarian, Dmitry Lagutov; Sable (Shedworks, Raw Fury) — Gregorios Kythreotis, Daniel Fineberg

=== Immersive Reality ===
**Immersive Reality Game of the Year**: **Lone Echo II (Ready at Dawn, Oculus Studios) — Nathan Phail-Liff, Robert Duncan, Alex Salcedo, Ru Weerasuriya, Dana Jan, Garret Foster**‡; Demeo (Resolution Games) — Johan Donwill, Mike Booth, Tommy Palm; I Expect You to Die 2: The Spy and the Liar (Schell Games) — Matthew Mahon, John Joy, Tera Nguyen, Charlie Amis, Francisco Souki, Adam Whalen, John Kolencheryl, Frank Lubsey; Resident Evil 4 VR (Armature Studio, Oculus Studios) — Tom Ivey, Mark Pacini; Song in the Smoke (17-Bit) — Jake Kazdal, Ray Joshi, Rich McCormick, Alex Miyamoto, Andrew Palmer, Koichi Yamagishi, Callen Wagner, Ally Mobbs, Sam Bird	**Immersive Reality Technical Achievement**: **Lone Echo II (Ready at Dawn, Oculus Studios) — Nathan Phail-Liff, Robert Duncan, Alex Salcedo, Ru Weerasuriya, Dana Jan, Garret Foster**‡; Puzzling Places (realities.io Inc) — Shahriar Shahrabi, Marcel Poppe, Azad Balabanian, Daniel Kraft, Daniel Sproll, Pierre-Marie Blind; Resident Evil 4 VR (Armature Studio, Oculus Studios) — Steve McCrea; Song in the Smoke (17-Bit) — Jake Kazdal, Colin Williamson, Akintunde Omitowoju, Joshua Rowan, Dan Nagase, Rhodri Broadbent, Colin Williamson, Paul Leonard; YUKI (ARVORE Immersive Experiences) — Kako, Pedro Câmara, Rômulo Santos, Marcus Penna, Thello Caetano, Rebeca Traldi, Carlo "Zed" Caputo

=== Craft awards ===
**Outstanding Achievement in Game Direction**: **Deathloop (Arkane Studios, Bethesda Softworks) — Dinga Bakaba**‡; Inscryption (Daniel Mullins Games, Devolver Digital) — Daniel Mullins; It Takes Two (Hazelight Studios, Electronic Arts) — Josef Fares; Ratchet & Clank: Rift Apart (Insomniac Games, Sony Interactive Entertainment) — Marcus Smith, Mike Daly, Peter Chan; The Artful Escape (Beethoven & Dinosaur, Annapurna Interactive) — Johnny Galvatron, Justin Blackwell, Dean Woodward	**Outstanding Achievement in Game Design**: **It Takes Two (Hazelight Studios, Electronic Arts) — Filip Coulianos**‡; Deathloop (Arkane Studios, Bethesda Softworks) — Gauthier Roussel; Inscryption (Daniel Mullins Games, Devolver Digital) — Daniel Mullins; Loop Hero (Four Quarters, Devolver Digital) — Aleksandr Goreslavets, Dmitry Karimov, Aleksandr Vartazarian, Dmitry Lagutov; Ratchet & Clank: Rift Apart (Insomniac Games, Sony Interactive Entertainment) — Mark Stuart, Joel Goodsell, Duncan Moore
**Outstanding Achievement in Animation**: **Ratchet & Clank: Rift Apart (Insomniac Games, Sony Interactive Entertainment) — Kevin Grow, Elliott Grossman, Steve Ryder**‡; Call of Duty: Vanguard (Sledgehammer Games, Activision) — Conant Fong, Colin O'Connor, Ryan Hood-Guaraldi; Deathloop (Arkane Studios, Bethesda Softworks) — Damien Pougheon; Kena: Bridge of Spirits (Ember Lab) — Hunter Schmidt; Resident Evil Village (Capcom) — Masato Miyazaki, Tetsuhei Asano, Hiroko Ihara, Yuyu Takasaki	**Outstanding Achievement in Art Direction**: **Ratchet & Clank: Rift Apart (Insomniac Games, Sony Interactive Entertainment) — Grant Hollis, Dave Guertin, Brian Mullen**‡; Call of Duty: Vanguard (Sledgehammer Games, Activision) — Joe Salud, Yi-chao Sandy Lin-Chiang, Matt Abbott; Deathloop (Arkane Studios, Bethesda Softworks) — Sebastien Mitton; Kena: Bridge of Spirits (Ember Lab) — Mike Grier, Wanchana "Vic" Intrasombat, Julian Vermeulen; Resident Evil Village (Capcom) — Tomonori Takano
**Outstanding Achievement in Character**: **Lady Dimitrescu, Resident Evil Village (Capcom) — Portrayed by Maggie Robertson; written by Antony Johnston**‡; Colt Vahn, Deathloop (Arkane Studios, Bethesda Softworks) — Portrayed by Jason E. Kelley; Kena, Kena: Bridge of Spirits (Ember Lab) — Portrayed by Dewa Ayu Dewi Larransanti; written by Josh Grier; Alex Chen, Life Is Strange: True Colors (Deck Nine Games, Square Enix) — Portrayed by Erika Mori; written by Felice Kuan; game directed by Zak Garriss; performance directed by Webb Pickersgillo; casting directed by Silvia Gregory, CSA; narrative directed by Jonathan Zimmerman; Rivet, Ratchet & Clank: Rift Apart (Insomniac Games, Sony Interactive Entertainment) — Portrayed by Jennifer Hale; written by Lauren Mee and Nick Folkman	**Outstanding Achievement in Original Music Composition**: **Returnal (Housemarque, Sony Interactive Entertainment) — Bobby Krlic, Joe Thwaites, Harry Krueger**‡; Deathloop (Arkane Studios, Bethesda Softworks) — Tom Salta, Erich Talaba, Ross Tregenza; It Takes Two (Hazelight Studios, Electronic Arts) — Gustaf Grefberg, Kristofer Eng; Kena: Bridge of Spirits (Ember Lab) — Jason Gallaty, I Dewa Putu Berata; Psychonauts 2 (Double Fine Productions, Xbox Game Studios) — Peter McConnell
**Outstanding Achievement in Audio Design**: **Returnal (Housemarque, Sony Interactive Entertainment) — Loic Couthier, Simon Gumbleton, Harry Krueger**‡; Forza Horizon 5 (Playground Games, Xbox Game Studios) — Fraser Strachan; Halo Infinite (343 Industries, Xbox Game Studios) — Sotaro "Tajeen" Tojima, Chase Thompson, Kyle Fraser, Jomo Kangethe, Robbie Elias; It Takes Two (Hazelight Studios, Electronic Arts) — Philip Eriksson; Ratchet & Clank: Rift Apart (Insomniac Games, Sony Interactive Entertainment) — Daniel Birczynski, Jeremie Voillot, Paul Mudra	**Outstanding Achievement in Story**: **Marvel's Guardians of the Galaxy (Eidos Montréal, Square Enix) — Mary DeMarle, Jean-François Dugas**‡; Before Your Eyes (Goodbye World Games, Skybound Entertainment) — Graham Parkes, Oliver Lewin, Will Hellwarth; Inscryption (Daniel Mullins Games, Devolver Digital) — Daniel Mullins; Psychonauts 2 (Double Fine Productions, Xbox Game Studios) — Tim Schafer; The Forgotten City (Modern Storyteller, Dear Villagers) — Nick Pearce, Alex Gos, John Eyre
**Outstanding Technical Achievement**: **Ratchet & Clank: Rift Apart (Insomniac Games, Sony Interactive Entertainment) — Mike Fitzgerald, Al Hastings, Peter Kao**‡; Battlefield 2042 (DICE, Criterion Games, EA Gothenburg, Ripple Effect Studios, Electronic Arts) — Daniel Berlin, Mikael Uddholm; Forza Horizon 5 (Playground Games, Xbox Game Studios) — Alan Roberts, Matt Craven; Moncage (Optillusion, XD) — Dong Zhou; Returnal (Housemarque, Sony Interactive Entertainment) — Ethan Watson, Risto Jankkila, Markku Velinen

=== Genre awards ===
**Action Game of the Year**: **Halo Infinite (343 Industries, Xbox Game Studios) — Bonnie Ross, Joseph Staten, David Berger, Pierre Hintze, Paul Crocker, Tom French**‡; Deathloop (Arkane Studios, Bethesda Softworks) — Dinga Bakaba; Metroid Dread (Mercury Steam, Nintendo EPD) — Yoshio Sakamoto, Jose Luis Márquez, Fumi Hayashi; Returnal (Housemarque, Sony Interactive Entertainment) — Gregory Louden, Harri Tikannen, Harry Krueger; The Ascent (Neon Giant, Curve Games) — Arcade Berg, Tor Frick, Si Donbavand	**Adventure Game of the Year**: **Marvel's Guardians of the Galaxy (Eidos Montréal, Square Enix) — Olivier Proulx, Jean-François Dugas**‡; Death's Door (Acid Nerve, Devolver Digital) — Mark Foster, David Fenn; It Takes Two (Hazelight Studios, Electronic Arts) — Aimar Bergan, Josef Fares; Psychonauts 2 (Double Fine Productions, Xbox Game Studios) — Tim Schafer, Lisette-Titre Montgomery, Seth Marinello; Resident Evil Village (Capcom) — Jun Takeuchi, Tsuyoshi Kanda, Masachika Kawata, Morimasa Sato
**Family Game of the Year**: **Ratchet & Clank: Rift Apart (Insomniac Games, Sony Interactive Entertainment) — Marcus Smith, Mike Daly, Peter Chan**‡; Animal Crossing: New Horizons - Happy Home Paradise (Nintendo EPD) — Hisashi Nogama, Yoshifumi Masaki; Cozy Grove (Spry Fox, QAG) — David Edery, Daniel Cook; Mario Party Superstars (NDcube, Nintendo) — Toshiaki Suzuki, Shuichiro Nishiya, Takeru Sugimoto; WarioWare: Get It Together (Intelligent Systems, Nintendo) — Kensuke Tanabe, Toshio Sengoku, Atsushi Ikuno, Naoki Nakano, Goro Abe, Yu Yamanaka	**Fighting Game of the Year**: **Guilty Gear Strive (Arc System Works) — Daisuke Ishiwatari**‡; Melty Blood: Type Lumina (French Bread, DELiGHTWORKS) — Nobuhisa Hiroshige, Kinoko Nasu, Kamone Serizawa; Nickelodeon All-Star Brawl (Ludosity, Fair Play Labs, GameMill Entertainment) — Elias Forslind, Diego Rodriguez, Matías R. Singer
**Racing Game of the Year**: **Forza Horizon 5 (Playground Games, Xbox Game Studios) — Adam Askew, Mike Brown, Don Arceta**‡; F1 2021 (Codemasters, Electronic Arts) — Christopher Gray, Gavin Cooper, Lee Mather; Hot Wheels Unleashed (Milestone) — Michele Caletti, Domenica Celenza, Federico Cardini	**Role-Playing Game of the Year**: **Final Fantasy XIV: Endwalker (Square Enix) — Naoki Yoshida**‡; Pathfinder: Wrath of the Righteous (Owlcat Games, META Publishing) — Alexander Mishulin; Shin Megami Tensei V (Atlus, Sega) — Shigeo Komori; Tales of Arise (Bandai Namco Studios, Bandai Namco Entertainment) — Yusuke Tomizawa, Hirokazu Kagawa; Wildermyth (Worldwalker Games, WhisperGames) — Nate Austin, Anne Austin, Douglas Austin
**Sports Game of the Year**: **Mario Golf: Super Rush (Camelot, Nintendo) — Hiroyuki Takahashi, Shinya Saito, Hiroyuki Takahashi, Shugo Takahashi, Tomohiro Yamamura**‡; FIFA 22 (EA Vancouver, EA Romania, Electronic Arts) — Nicholas Wlodyka; NBA 2K22 (Visual Concepts, 2K Games) — Erick Boenisch, Mike Wang; Riders Republic (Ubisoft Annecy, Ubisoft) — Sebastien Arnoult, Igor Manceau, Arnaud Ragot; The Climb 2 (Crytek) — Fatih Özbayram, Andreas Liebeskind, Sebastien Laurent, Matthias Otto	**Strategy/Simulation Game of the Year**: **Age of Empires IV (Relic Entertainment, World's Edge, Xbox Game Studios) — Shannon Loftis, Adam Isgreen, Quinn Duffy, Greg Wilson, Michael Mann, Wilfried Schmidt, Lawrence Ward, Joel Pritchett, Zach Schlappi, Han Randhawa**‡; Gloomhaven (Flaming Fowl Studios, Asmodee Digital) — Isaac Childres, Mike West; Griftlands (Klei Entertainment) — Kevin Forbes, Chris Costa; Inscryption (Daniel Mullins Games, Devolver Digital) — Daniel Mullins; Loop Hero (Four Quarters, Devolver Digital) — Aleksandr Goreslavets, Dmitry Karimov, Aleksandr Vartazarian, Dmitry Lagutov

=== Special awards ===
==== Hall of Fame ====
- Ed Boon

==== Lifetime Achievement ====
- Phil Spencer

=== Multiple nominations and awards ===
==== Multiple Nominations ====
Games that received multiple nominations
Nominations	Game
9	Ratchet & Clank: Rift Apart
8	Deathloop
6	Inscryption
6	It Takes Two
5	Returnal
4	Kena: Bridge of Spirits
4	Resident Evil Village
3	Call of Duty: Vanguard
3	Forza Horizon 5
3	Halo Infinite
3	Loop Hero
3	Psychonauts 2
2	Death's Door
2	Final Fantasy XIV: Endwalker
2	Marvel's Guardians of the Galaxy
2	Lone Echo II
2	Moncage
2	Resident Evil 4 VR
2	Song in the Smoke

Nominations by company
Nominations	Games	Company
14	2	Sony Interactive Entertainment
11	3	Devolver Digital
10	5	Electronic Arts
10	4	Xbox Game Studios
9	1	Insomniac Games
8	1	Arkane Studios
8	1	Bethesda Softworks
6	1	Daniel Mullins Games
6	1	Hazelight Studios
5	5	Nintendo
5	3	Square Enix
5	1	Housemarque
4	2	Oculus Studios
4	1	Capcom
4	1	Ember Lab
3	1	343 Industries
3	1	Activision
3	1	Double Fine Productions
3	1	Four Quarters
3	1	Playground Games
3	1	Sledgehammer Games
2	1	17-Bit
2	1	Acid Nerve
2	1	Armature
2	1	Eidos-Montréal
2	1	Optillusion
2	1	Ready at Dawn
2	1	XD

==== Multiple awards ====
Games that received multiple awards
Awards	Game
4	Ratchet & Clank: Rift Apart
2	Halo Infinite
2	It Takes Two
2	Lone Echo II
2	Marvel's Guardians of the Galaxy
2	Returnal

Awards by company
Awards	Games	Company
6	2	Sony Interactive Entertainment
4	3	Xbox Game Studios
4	1	Insomniac Games
3	2	Square Enix
2	1	343 Industries
2	1	Eidos-Montréal
2	1	Electronic Arts
2	1	Hazelight Studios
2	1	Housemarque
2	1	Oculus Studios
2	1	Ready at Dawn
