= Deformers =

2017 multiplayer brawler video game

- Developer: Ready at Dawn
- Publisher: GameTrust
- Platforms: PlayStation 4, Windows, Xbox One
- Release: April 21, 2017
- Genre: Brawler
- Mode: Multiplayer

Deformers is a 2017 multiplayer brawler video game developed by Ready at Dawn and published by GameTrust for Windows, PlayStation 4, and Xbox One.

== Gameplay ==
Deformers is a multiplayer brawler game played from a third-person perspective. Players take control of squishy ball-shaped creatures called a Forms that are capable of rolling, jumping, dashing, and absorbing items. In the deathmatch and team deathmatch modes, the goal is to roll around and knock opponents off the arena platform. Form-ball is a mode that plays like soccer; a ball must be knocked into a net to score goals. The game supports online two-, three-, and four-player splitscreen as well as online multiplayer with up to eight players.

== Development ==
Deformers was developed by video game studio Ready at Dawn. The project began as a physics technology demonstration. A duo at the studio began working on prototype for Deformers in August 2014 while most employees were occupied with The Order: 1886.

It was announced that Deformers would shut down on 9 August 2018.

== Release ==
Deformers was initially scheduled to launch for Windows, PlayStation 4, and Xbox One on February 14, 2017, however it was delayed so that the development team could address issues from feedback they had received. An open beta of the Windows version ran from April 1–4 on the digital distribution service Steam. Deformers was the second game published by GameStop's publishing program GameTrust. The game was released on April 21, 2017.

== Reception ==
Reception

Aggregate score
Aggregator	Score
Metacritic	60/100 (PS4); 49/100 (XBO)

Deformers received a mixed reception from critics. It was nominated for "Original Score - Video Game" at the 2017 Hollywood Music in Media Awards.
