= Pode =

2018 video game

- Pode logo
- Developers: Henchman & Goon
- Publishers: Henchman & Goon
- Composer: Austin Wintory
- Platforms: Nintendo Switch; PlayStation 4; Microsoft Windows; Xbox One; Xbox Series X/S
- Release: Nintendo Switch: NA: June 21, 2018; PlayStation 4: NA: February 19, 2019; Microsoft Windows: NA: April 3, 2020; Xbox One, Xbox Series X/S: WW: March 13, 2026
- Genres: Puzzle, adventure
- Modes: Single-player, multiplayer

Pode is a co-operative puzzler by Norwegian indie developer Henchman & Goon. It was released for the Nintendo Switch on June 21, 2018, for the PlayStation 4 on February 19, 2019, and for Microsoft Windows on April 3, 2020. The game was later released for the Xbox One and Xbox Series X/S on March 13, 2026. The game's story centers around a rock trying to help a fallen star work its way back home.

== Reception ==
=== Accolades ===
The game was nominated for "Original Score" at the 9th Hollywood Music in Media Awards, and for "Best Original Soundtrack Album" at the 2019 G.A.N.G. Awards.
