= Lone Echo II =

2021 video game

- Developer: Ready At Dawn
- Publisher: Oculus Studios
- Directors: Ru Weerasuriya; Nathan Phal-Liff
- Writers: Ru Weerasuriya; Cory Lanham
- Composer: Jason Graves
- Platforms: Oculus Rift, Oculus Rift S
- Release: October 12, 2021
- Genre: Adventure
- Mode: Single-player

Lone Echo II is a 2021 virtual reality adventure game which serves as the sequel to 2017's Lone Echo, both developed by Ready at Dawn and published by Oculus Studios.

== Gameplay ==
Lone Echo II features similar gameplay to its predecessor, revolving around zero gravity locomotion, with the player grabbing and pushing off various objects in the environment. Players are equipped with wrist thrusters and an EVA booster that gives them full mobility in the zero gravity environment. The gameplay is based around puzzle-solving through interaction with objects in the game world, such as cranes, doors, socketing items, holographic maps, etc. Players have access to a variety of tools including the scanning and cutting tools from Lone Echo. The game differs from Lone Echo in that there are enemies which the player has to avoid and distract.

== Plot ==
After the events of Lone Echo, Captain Olivia "Liv" Rhodes and Echo One "Jack", the player controlled android, find themselves 400 years in the future. They discover they are aboard a mysterious space station called "Chiron Station" that seems to be abandoned. They uncover that the biomass they encountered in Lone Echo has evolved into a mobile form called "ticks" that are attracted to energy sources. Liv and Jack must solve the mystery of this future space station if they want to find their way home.

== Development ==
The game was announced at Oculus Connect 5 with the release of a six-minute VR trailer experience. The Lone Echo II: Trailer Experience was a VR Awards Finalist for VR Marketing of the Year. For Lone Echo II, Ready at Dawn focused on expanding the game world and building upon the game mechanics of Lone Echo. Lone Echo II added new tools, more complex puzzles, and new enemies for players to avoid. The studio talked about the challenges of adjusting tracking for the game due to the inside-out tracking of the Oculus Rift S. It will be the studio's third virtual reality game.

At E3 2019, Ready At Dawn released a demo on the show floor as a part of the Oculus Studios booth. The demo gave players their first look at the newly developed gameplay mechanics and a glimpse into the story. It was announced at E3 2019 that the game was delayed from 2019 to Q1 2020. In a blog post released by Ready At Dawn, they discuss the impact COVID-19 had on the development of Lone Echo II and the further delay of the game's release, but said they still expected a 2020 release. In June 2020, Ready at Dawn was acquired by Facebook.

== Reception ==
Reception

Aggregate score
| Aggregator | Score |
|---|---|
| Metacritic | 78/100 |

Review scores
| Publication | Score |
|---|---|
| IGN | 6/10 |
| Shacknews | 8/10 |

Lone Echo II received "generally favorable" reviews according to review aggregator Metacritic. IGN stated "Lone Echo 2 is an enjoyable space drama with striking details and fun movement mechanics, but it lacks innovation and struggles to justify its eight-hour runtime." While enjoying the world the game was set in, Road to VR criticized the lack of challenging gameplay in the title, writing "Lone Echo II just never asks that much of you, and subsequently doesn't ever manage to raise the level of tension". Windows Central praised the improved sound design and visuals, "the enhanced visuals are stunning, and the animation on Liv's face is nothing short of movie quality". UploadVR disliked the pacing of the game, feeling it took too long to explain basic concepts to the player, "Characters sluggishly reach conclusions that you've come to minutes before they've finished a monologue, or deliver objectives to pull switches or scan items long after you've already completed them".

Lone Echo II was awarded with "Immersive Reality Technical Achievement" and "Immersive Reality Game of the Year" at the 25th Annual D.I.C.E. Awards, and was nominated for "Best VR/AR Game" at The Game Awards 2021.
