= Austin Wintory =

American film and video games composer (born 1984)

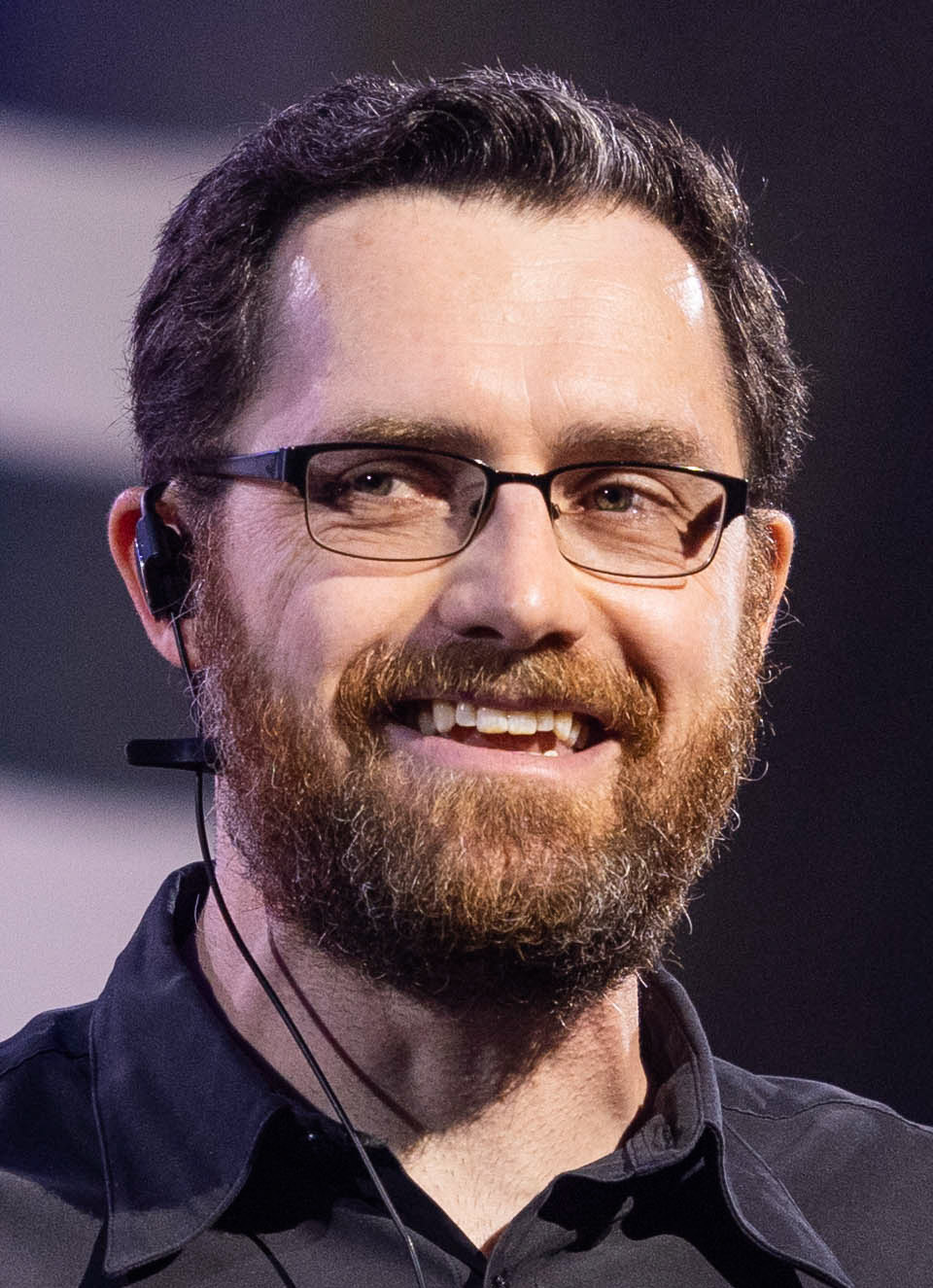
- Wintory at the Game Developers Conference in 2024

Background information
- Born: September 9, 1984 (age 42); Denver, Colorado, U.S.
- Genres: classical rock, electronic rock
- Occupations: Composer, conductor
- Years active: 2002–present
- Spouse: Angela Bermúdez (m. 2024)
- Website: Official website

Austin Wintory (born September 9, 1984) is an American composer for film and video games. He is known for scoring the video games Flow and Journey, the latter of which made history as the only video game soundtrack to date to be nominated for the Grammy Award for Best Score Soundtrack for Visual Media.

== Early life ==
Austin Wintory was born in Denver, Colorado in 1984 and started learning piano when he was ten years old, after his teacher introduced him to composer Jerry Goldsmith. Before the age of ten, Wintory did not play any instruments and barely listened to music. By the age of sixteen, Wintory started writing for and conducting the Cherry Creek High School Orchestra during their performances of the "Spirit of the Cosmos" pieces. Two years later, at the age of eighteen, Wintory conducted the Utah Symphony during its recording of "Cosmos", which became one of his most popular projects, although he refers to it as "atrocious garbage". Since 2003, Wintory has composed over three hundred musical scores.

== Career ==
=== Beginning of game composing career and Flow ===
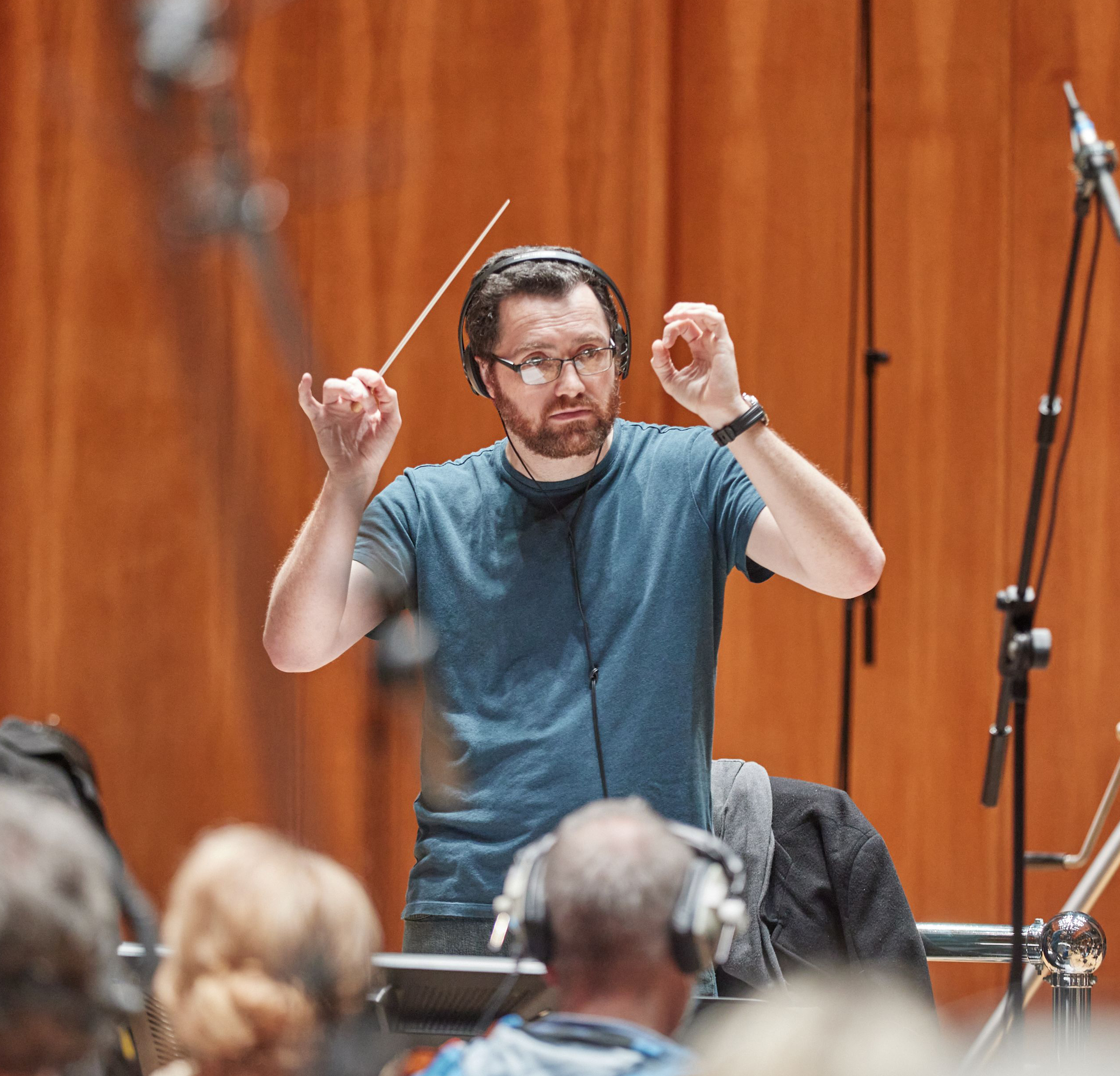
Wintory recording Traveler: A Journey Symphony with the London Symphony Orchestra

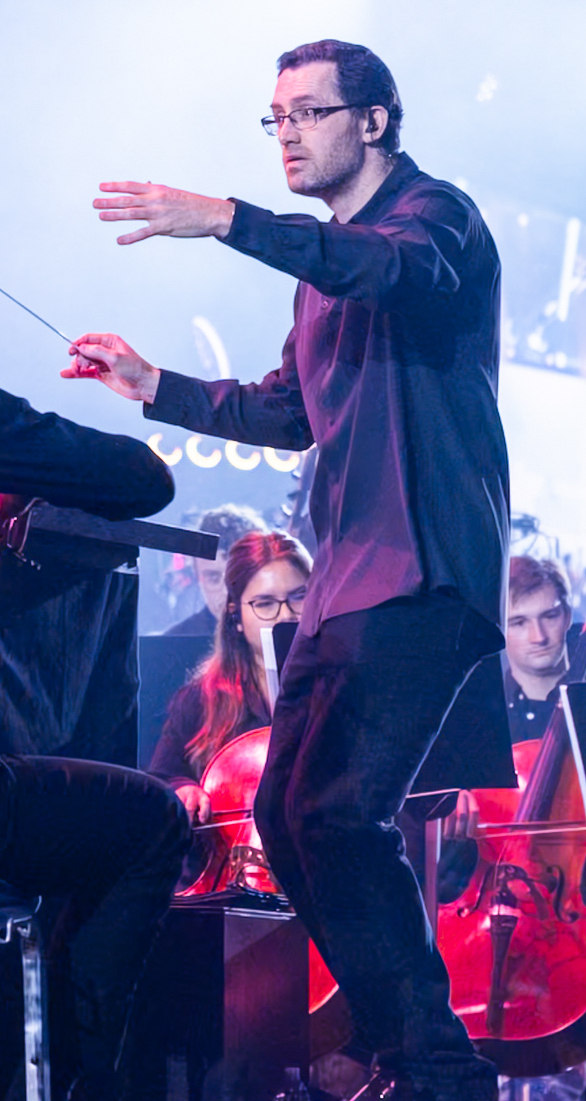
Wintory conducting at the Game Developer's Concert in 2026

Wintory met Jenova Chen while both attended the University of Southern California (USC). After networking with an interactive media student at USC and scoring a small game project, his name was passed along to Chen, who asked Wintory to score his thesis project, Flow, later re-released on PlayStation Network. Wintory, Chen and Nick Clarke developed the first version of Flow as a three-man team, with Wintory remarking that Chen had an incredible way of processing information, seeing far beyond code and reaching into the emotional implications of things. As a traditional orchestral student at the time, Wintory considered the music of Flow was radically unlike any he had written before. Wintory regards the pink area of the game, where the player controls a jellyfish-like creature, as the humorous area of the game, describing his music for it as almost "circus-like" compared to the overall soundtrack.

=== Monaco ===
Originally, Monaco developer Andy Schatz sought out licensed music as a backdrop to the game's setting, feeling that the style of music needed was too esoteric to hire a composer. Wintory, however, was able to convince Schatz that he could create an original score that fit the project's vision. Likening 2D sprite-based games to the silent film era, Wintory agreed with the notion that the soundtrack to a game like Monaco should have an earnest yet self-aware nostalgic feeling, stating "There's no way to just objectively listen to that style of music without automatically being like 'This reminds me of a bygone era.'" Wintory was excited at the chance to create an old-timey score with wit and humor, stating "when else am I ever going to be asked to write anything remotely like this?"

=== Other works ===
Wintory will compose the music and conduct a live orchestra for a touring BAFTA Games in Concert, to start in 2026 and featuring music from winners of the British Academy Games Awards.

== Works ==
=== Film and TV ===
| Year | Film |
|---|---|
| 2004 | Nuts & Bolts |
| 2004 | One Three Zero |
| 2004 | Blind Visions |
| 2004 | Man Child |
| 2004 | Alter Ego |
| 2004 | Love Parade |
| 2005 | It's About Ugliness |
| 2005 | Not Too Long Ago |
| 2005 | We Gonna Get Ronald Kim |
| 2005 | Keepsakes |
| 2005 | Painting Ava |
| 2005 | New York |
| 2005 | TAG |
| 2006 | Vollarians, Unite! |
| 2006 | Oleg's Overcoat |
| 2006 | Long After... |
| 2006 | The Sunset Sky |
| 2006 | Project: Illegal Alien |
| 2006 | Happy Days |
| 2006 | The Good Man |
| 2006 | The Late Bloomer |
| 2006 | Confessions |
| 2006 | The Proposal |
| 2006 | The Professor's Daughter |
| 2006 | Johnny Montana |
| 2007 | Mr. Sadman |
| 2007 | Captain Abu Raed |
| 2007 | If You Could Have |
| 2007 | Back Soon |
| 2007 | Serpent and the Sun |
| 2008 | Knuckle Draggers |
| 2008 | Print |
| 2008 | Grace |
| 2008 | Live Evil |
| 2008 | 3-Day Weekend |
| 2008 | The Acquirer |
| 2008 | TK's Corner |
| 2008 | Hubristic |
| 2009 | A Little Help |
| 2009 | The Sunset Sky |
| 2009 | The River Why |
| 2009 | The Echo Game |
| 2009 | Make the Yuletide Gay |
| 2010 | A Beautiful Game |
| 2010 | Leave |
| 2010 | Playing House |
| 2010 | Majid |
| 2010 | Workshop |
| 2010 | Let the Game Begin |
| 2010 | The Incredible Adventures of Jojo |
| 2011 | Remnants |
| 2011 | Home Run Showdown |
| 2011 | The Grief Tourist |
| 2011 | Junction |
| 2012 | Strangely in Love |
| 2012 | Inverse |
| 2012 | Targeting |
| 2012 | The War Around Us |
| 2012 | It's a Disaster |
| 2012 | Lost on Purpose |
| 2012 | Aftermath |
| 2013 | Targeting |
| 2013 | Inverse |
| 2015 | The Flintstones & WWE: Stone Age Smackdown |
| 2015 | Dark Summer |
| 2015 | Tales of Halloween |
| 2015 | The Rendezvous |
| 2015 | Standoff |
| 2016 | After the Sun Fell |
| 2016 | Diane |
| 2016 | Mercury Plains |
| 2017 | Legacy |
| 2017 | The Last Movie Star |
| 2017 | Bullet Head |
| 2018 | Tread |
| 2018 | Big Dogs |
| 2019 | Clean |
| 2020 | Born a Champion |
| 2021 | One Shot |
| 2021 | Ire |
| 2021 | A Violent Man |
| 2022 | Thai Cave Rescue |
| 2026 | The Brink of War |

=== Games ===
| Year | Game | Developer |
|---|---|---|
| 2002 | Ages of Athiria (Theme Only) | Elysian Productions |
| 2006 | Flow | Thatgamecompany |
| 2007 | Flow Expansion Pack | Thatgamecompany, Super Villain Studios |
| 2007 | GroundTruth: Toxic City | Sandia Nat’l Lab, USC-Gamepipe |
| 2007 | Replay | Take Action Games |
| 2008 | GroundTruth 2: Lock Down | Sandia Nat’l Lab, USC-Gamepipe |
| 2008 | My Virtual Tutor | 1st Playable Productions |
| 2010 | Census | Draft FCB |
| 2010 | Super Awesome Mountain RPG | Codename Games |
| 2012 | Journey | Thatgamecompany |
| 2012 | Horn | Phosphor Games |
| 2012 | Kinect Party | Double Fine Productions |
| 2013 | Monaco: What's Yours Is Mine | Pocketwatch Games |
| 2013 | Leisure Suit Larry: Reloaded | N-Fusion Interactive |
| 2013 | Soundodger | Adult Swim Games, Studio Bean |
| 2013 | Dropchord | Double Fine Productions |
| 2014 | Soul Fjord | Airtight Games |
| 2014 | Sunset | Tale of Tales |
| 2014 | The Banner Saga | Stoic |
| 2015 | The Order: 1886 (co-writer of The Knights theme, with Jason Graves) | Ready at Dawn, Santa Monica Studio |
| 2015 | Assassin's Creed Syndicate | Ubisoft Quebec |
| 2015 | The Path to Luma | Phosphor Games |
| 2016 | The Banner Saga 2 | Stoic |
| 2016 | Abzû | Giant Squid Studios |
| 2017 | Deformers | Ready at Dawn |
| 2017 | Absolver | Sloclap |
| 2017 | Tooth and Tail | Pocketwatch Games |
| 2017 | Luna | Funomena |
| 2018 | Pode | Henchman & Goon |
| 2018 | The Banner Saga 3 | Stoic |
| 2018 | Command and Conquer: Rivals | Electronic Arts |
| 2019 | Erica | Flavourworks, London Studio |
| 2019 | John Wick Hex | Bithell Games |
| 2019 | The Bradwell Conspiracy | A Brave Plan, Bossa Studios |
| 2020 | The Pathless | Giant Squid |
| 2020 | AGOS: A Game of Space | Ubisoft |
| 2021 | Aliens: Fireteam Elite | Cold Iron Studios |
| 2022 | Monaco 2 | Pocketwatch Games |
| 2022 | HUSH - Crane | Flavourworks |
| 2023 | Strayed Lights | Embers |
| 2023 | Stray Gods: The Roleplaying Musical | Summerfall Studios |
| 2024 | BitCraft (Co-composed with Rachel Hardy) | Clockwork Labs |
| 2025 | Eternal Strands | Yellow Brick Games |
| 2025 | Sword of the Sea | Giant Squid |
| 2025 | Hades II (with co-composer Darren Korb) | Supergiant Games |

== Awards ==
List of awards and nominations
| Year | Award | Category | Recipients and nominees | Result | Ref. |
|---|---|---|---|---|---|
| 2007 | British Academy Games Awards (BAFTAs) | Innovation | Flow (Jenova Chen, Nicholas Clark, Austin Wintory) | Nominated | |
| 2012 | Video game awards | Best Original Score | Journey | Nominated | |
| 2012 | Video game awards | Best Song in a Game | Journey | Nominated | |
| 2012 | International Film Music Critics Association Awards | Original Score for a Video Game or Interactive Media | Journey | Won | |
| 2012 | Spike Video Game Awards | Best Song in a Game | "I Was Born for This" – Journey | Nominated | |
| 2013 | Game Developers Choice Awards | Best Audio | Journey | Won | |
| 2013 | British Academy Games Awards (BAFTAs) | Audio Achievement | Journey | Won | |
| 2013 | British Academy Games Awards (BAFTAs) | Original Music | Journey | Won | |
| 2013 | D.I.C.E. Awards | Outstanding Achievement in Original Music Composition | Journey | Won | |
| 2013 | Grammy Awards | Best Score Soundtrack for Visual Media | Journey | Nominated | |
| 2014 | NAVGTR Awards | Original Dramatic Score, New IP | The Banner Saga | Nominated | |
| 2014 | International Film Music Critics Association Awards | Original Score for a Video Game or Interactive Media | The Banner Saga | Nominated | |
| 2015 | British Academy Games Awards (BAFTAs) | Best Music | The Banner Saga | Nominated | |
| 2015 | British Academy Games Awards (BAFTAs) | Audio Achievement | The Banner Saga | Nominated | |
| 2015 | SXSW Gaming Awards | Excellence in Musical Scoring | The Banner Saga | Nominated | |
| 2015 | Game Audio Network Guild Awards | Music of the Year | Assassin's Creed Syndicate | Nominated | |
| 2015 | Game Audio Network Guild Awards | Best Original Soundtrack Album | Assassin's Creed Syndicate | Nominated | |
| 2015 | Game Audio Network Guild Awards | Best Original Instrumental | Assassin's Creed Syndicate – "The Assassin's Two Step" | Nominated | |
| 2015 | International Film Music Critics Association Awards | Original Score for a Video Game or Interactive Media | Assassin's Creed Syndicate | Won | |
| 2016 | International Film Music Critics Association Awards | Original Score for a Video Game or Interactive Media | Abzû | Won | |
| 2016 | International Film Music Critics Association Awards | Original Score for a Video Game or Interactive Media | The Banner Saga 2 | Nominated | |
| 2017 | International Film Music Critics Association Awards | Original Score for a Video Game or Interactive Media | Deformers | Nominated | |
| 2017 | International Film Music Critics Association Awards | Best Original Score for an Action/Adventure/Thriller Film | The Rendezvous | Nominated | |
| 2017 | British Academy Games Awards (BAFTAs) | Music | Abzû | Nominated | |
| 2017 | D.I.C.E. Awards | Outstanding Achievement in Original Music Composition | Abzû | Nominated | |
| 2017 | Game Audio Network Guild Awards | Best Original Soundtrack | Abzû | Won | |
| 2018 | Hollywood Music in Media Awards | Original Score – Independent Film | The Last Movie Star | Nominated | |
| 2018 | Hollywood Music in Media Awards | Original Score – Video Game | Pode | Nominated | |
| 2018 | Hollywood Music in Media Awards | Original Song – Video Game | "Only We Few Remember it Now" (The Banner Saga 3) | Won | |
| 2019 | Game Audio Network Guild Awards | Best Original Soundtrack | Pode | Nominated | |
| 2019 | Game Audio Network Guild Awards | Best Original Song "Only We Few Remember It Know" | The Banner Saga 3 | Nominated | |
| 2019 | International Film Music Critics Association Awards | Original Score for a Video Game or Interactive Media | Erica | Nominated | |
| 2020 | Game Audio Network Guild Awards | Best Interactive Score | Erica | Won | |
| 2020 | Game Audio Network Guild Awards | Best Original Instrumental | Erica | Won | |
| 2020 | D.I.C.E. Awards | Outstanding Achievement in Original Music Composition | Erica | Nominated | |
| 2021 | Game Audio Network Guild Awards | Best Music for an Indie Game | The Pathless | Won | |
| 2021 | D.I.C.E. Awards | Outstanding Achievement in Original Music Composition | The Pathless | Nominated | |
| 2023 | Grammy Awards | Best Score Soundtrack for Video Games and Other Interactive Media | Aliens: Fireteam Elite | Nominated | |
| 2024 | Grammy Awards | Best Score Soundtrack for Video Games and Other Interactive Media | Stray Gods: The Roleplaying Musical | Nominated | |
| 2026 | Grammy Awards | Best Score Soundtrack for Video Games and Other Interactive Media | Sword of the Sea | Won | |
| 2026 | D.I.C.E. Awards | Outstanding Achievement in Original Music Composition | Sword of the Sea | Nominated | |
