= 9th Hollywood Music in Media Awards =

US film music awards ceremony in 2018

- Date: 14 November 2018
- Location: Avalon Hollywood, Hollywood
- Website: www.hmmawards.com

The 9th Hollywood Music in Media Awards was held on November 14, 2018 to recognize the best in music in film, TV, video games, commercials, and trailers. The nominations were announced on October 16, 2018. The winners were announced on November 14, 2018.

== Winners and nominees ==
Original Score — Feature Film	Original Score — Sci-Fi/Fantasy/Horror Film
Max Richter - Mary Queen of Scots; Alexandre Desplat - The Sisters Brothers; Carter Burwell - The Ballad of Buster Scruggs; Hans Zimmer - Widows; Justin Hurwitz - First Man; Kris Bowers - Green Book; Nicholas Britell - If Beale Street Could Talk; Teddy Shapiro - Destroyer; Terence Blanchard - BlacKkKlansman	Ludwig Göransson - Black Panther; Alan Silvestri - Ready Player One; Christophe Beck - Ant-Man and the Wasp; Marc Shaiman - Mary Poppins Returns; Marco Beltrami - A Quiet Place; Tyler Bates - Deadpool 2
Original Score — Animated Film	Original Score — Documentary
Alexandre Desplat - Isle of Dogs; Bruno Coulais - White Fang; Chris Bacon - Sherlock Gnomes; Heitor Pereira - Smallfoot; Henry Jackman - Ralph Breaks the Internet; Michael Giacchino - Incredibles 2	Cyrille Aufort - March of the Penguins: The Next Step; Daniel Pemberton, Simon Ashdown, Will Slater - One Strange Rock; Jonathan Kirkscey - Won't You Be My Neighbor?; Marco Beltrami - Free Solo; Miriam Cutler - RBG; Patrick Jonsson - On Her Shoulders
Original Song - Feature Film	Original Song — Sci-Fi/Fantasy/Horror Film
"Shallow" from A Star Is Born - Written by Lady Gaga, Mark Ronson, Anthony Rossomando and Andrew Wyatt; Performed by Lady Gaga and Bradley Cooper; "Animal Sauvage" from The Equalizer 2 - Written by Gertjan Mulder; Performed by Brainpower, Pharoahe Monch, Pitcho Womba Konga and STIX; "For You" from Fifty Shades Freed - Written by Andrew Watt, Ali Payami, Ali Tamposi; Performed by Liam Payne & Rita Ora; "Girl in the Movies" from Dumplin' - Written by Dolly Parton and Linda Perry; Performed by Dolly Parton; "Living in the Moment" Book Club - Written by Carole Bayer Sager, Jay Landers, Walter Afanasieff; Performed by Katharine McPhee; "Revelation" from Boy Erased - Written by Leland, Troye Sivan & Jónsi; Performed by Troye Sivan & Jónsi; "We Won't Move" from The Hate U Give - Written and performed by Arlissa; "Here Comes The Change" from On the Basis of Sex - Written by Kesha Sebert, Drew Pearson, & Stephen Wrabel; Performed by Kesha	"All the Stars" from Black Panther - Written by Kendrick Lamar, SZA, Sounwave, and Al Shux; Performed by Kendrick Lamar and SZA; "Ashes" from Deadpool 2 - Written by Petey Martin, Jordan Smith and Tedd T; Performed by Celine Dion; "Fall on Me" from The Nutcracker and the Four Realms - Written by Ian Axel, Chad Vaccarino, Matteo Bocelli and Fortunato Zampaglione; Performed by Andrea Bocelli and Matteo Bocelli; "The Place Where Lost Things Go" from Mary Poppins Returns - Written by Marc Shaiman and Scott Wittman; Performed by Cast; "Trip a Little Light Fantastic" from Mary Poppins Returns - Written by Marc Shaiman and Scott Wittman. Performed by Cast
Original Song — Animated Film	Original Song — Documentary
"Stronger Than I Ever Was" from Sherlock Gnomes - Written by Elton John and Bernie Taupin; Performed by Mary J. Blige; "Finally Free" from Smallfoot - Written and performed by Niall Horan; "Good Day" from Early Man - Written and performed by New Hope Club; "I Promise You" from Peter Rabbit - Written by Ezra Koenig; Performed by James Corden	"I’ll Fight" from RBG - Written by Diane Warren; Performed by Jennifer Hudson; "Gravity" from Free Solo - Written by Tim McGraw and Lori McKenna; Performed by Tim McGraw; "Keep Reachin'" from Quincy - Written by Quincy Jones, Mark Ronson, Yebba Smith; Performed by Mark Ronson and Chaka Khan; "Song for the Untitled" from Yo Galgo - Written by Rickie Lee Kroell and Arturo Cardelús; Performed by Rickie Lee Kroell; "These Are the Words" from Pope Francis: A Man of His Word - Written by Patti Smith and Tony Shanahan; Performed by Patti Smith
Music Documentary/Special Program	Soundtrack Album
Quincy; Rapture; Goodnight Brooklyn - The Story of Death by Audio; Grace Jones: Bloodlight and Bami	Black Panther; A Star is Born; Deadpool 2; Fifty Shades Darker; Mamma Mia! Here We Go Again
Original Score — TV Show/Limited Series	Song/Score - Trailer
Nicholas Britell - Succession; Daniel Pemberton - Black Mirror; Mark Isham, Cindy O'Connor, Michael D. Simon - Once Upon a Time; Nico Muhly - Howards End; Ramin Djawadi - Westworld; Thomas Newman, Chris Westlake - Castle Rock	Pawel Gorniak - Crossfire 2; Danny Cocke- Lost in Space; Don Bodin - Ready Player One; Jochem Weierink - Bumblebee; Kurt Oldman - Perfect; Steven Vitali - The Jewels of the Salton Sea
Outstanding Music Supervision — Film	Outstanding Music Supervision — Television
Julianne Jordan and Julia Michels - A Star Is Born; Becky Bentham - Mamma Mia! Here We Go Again; Dave Jordan - Black Panther; Gabe Hilfer - Tag; John Houlihan - Deadpool 2; Lynn Fainchtein - Roma	Jen Ross - Power; Bruce Gilbert - GLOW; Charles Scott IV - Castle Rock; Morgan Rhodes - Dear White People; Season Kent - 13 Reasons Why
Original Score — Independent Film	Original Song — Independent Film
Thomas Adès - Colette; Austin Wintory - The Last Movie Star; Christopher Willis - The Death of Stalin; Harry Gregson-Williams - Breath; Jóhann Jóhannsson - Mandy; Nami Melumad - Miss Arizona	"Requiem For a Private War" from A Private War - Written and performed by Annie Lennox; "Hearts Beat Loud" from Hearts Beat Loud - Written by Keegan DeWitt; Performed by Kiersey Clemons; "Home Free" from Little Pink House - Written and performed by David Crosby; "To Get Here" from The Last Movie Star - Written by Diane Warren; Performed by Willie Nelson; "Sway Lake" from Song of Sway Lake - Written by Ethan Gold; Performed by John Grant
Original Score — Short Film	Original Score — Video Game
Nami Melumad - Passage; Billy Mallery - Baby Steps; Ivan Ruiz Serrano - Cherry; Joseph Stephens - The Take Off; Kyle Dixon & Michael Stein - Spheres; Ramesh Kumar Kannan - Dissonance	Jeff Broadbent and Tina Guo - Extinction; Austin Wintory - Pode; Bear McCreary - God of War; Glenn Stafford, Neal Acree, David Arkenstone, Clint Bajakian - World of Warcraft: Battle for Azeroth; John Paesano - Marvel's Spider-Man
Original Song — Video Game	Original Song/Score - Mobile Video Game
"Only We Few Remember it Now" from The Banner Saga 3 - Written by Austin Wintory; Performed by Eivør; "All Star" from Super NBA - Music by Jason Walsh; Written and performed and vocals by Satta; "A Fire In Your Mind" from Astro Bot Rescue Mission - Written and performed by Kenneth C M Young; "Warbringers: Jaina" from World of Warcraft: Battle for Azeroth - Written by Logan Laflotte and Neal Acree; Performed by Laura Bailey; "Forgotten Anne" from Forgotton Anne - Written and performed by Randi Laubek	Matthew Carl Earl - Arena of Valor: Flip the World; Ryan Richko - Rupert and Riley; Ariel Contreras-Esquivel - Mushroom Guardian; Gerard Marino - Rival: Crimson X Chaos; Igor Nemirovsky - Zootopia: Dreaming People; Sound of Games - June's Journey; Thomas Parisch & Edwin Wendler - Honor of Kings
Original Score — Independent Film (Foreign Language)	Original Score — Short Film (Foreign Language)
Joan Vilà – Quien Eres; Anne-Kathrin Dern – The Jade Pendant; Elik Alvarez & Sandro Morales-Santoro – Papita 2da Base; Neal Acree and Michael Tuller – Animal World; Ralf Wengenmayr – Jim Button and Luke the Engine Driver; Ricardo Curto – Halcon Ciego	Jessica Yap – Sigek Cokelat – A Chocolate Bar; Anne-Kathrin Dern – Vriend Van Goud; Carlos Rodriguez Rodriguez – Madrid Noir A VR Mystery; Roger Subirana – The T-Shirt; Xilan Wen – Most Beautiful Moment
Original Song/Score — Commercial Advertisement	Independent Music Video
Juliet Roberts – NBA Finals (“Finally Mine”); Ivan Capillas – Cicles (“Cicles”); Jesica Yap – Alexadre Christie Watch (“My Confidence”); Karsten Laser – Man Lions City 2018 (“City in Motion”); Nuno Malo – The Secret of Christmas (“November Glow”); That Kid CG – Oculus Rift (“Change the Game”)	Alex Boyé – "Bend Not Break"; Adam's Attic – "Sorry"; Jamie Meyer – "Nothin' on You"; Kassidy Lynne – "Baby Just Cruise"; Loud Luxury ft. Nikki's Wives – "Show Me"; Luc and the Lovingtons – "Welcome to My House"; MASA – "Deep Down"; Riston Diggs ft. Sly Beats – "Can't Remember"; The Veer Union – "Living Not Alive"; Tiana – "Just My Type"

== Jerry Goldsmith Award ==
- Carlos Rafael Rivera
