= Please, Don't Touch Anything =

Puzzle video game

- Developers: Four Quarters, Escalation Studios; ForwardXP (Nintendo Switch)
- Publishers: Bulkypix, Plug In Digital; ForwardXP (Nintendo Switch)
- Platforms: Windows; Mac OS X Linux iOS; Nintendo Switch; PlayStation 4 Xbox One
- Release: Windows, Mac OS X, Linux, iOS; March 26, 2015; Nintendo Switch: NA: June 13, 2019; AU: November 22, 2018; EU: June 13, 2019
- Genre: Puzzle
- Mode: Single player

Please, Don't Touch Anything, later re-released as Please, Don't Touch Anything: Classic on the Nintendo Switch in Europe and North America, is a puzzle video game developed by Russian indie studio Four Quarters and published by Bulkypix and Plug In Digital. It was released on March 26, 2015, on Steam for Windows, Mac OS X and Linux and on October 21, 2015, for iOS. It received a remake with virtual reality support, Please, Don't Touch Anything 3D, co-developed with Escalation Studios and released on December 7, 2016, on Steam for Windows and Mac OS X. An enhanced port of Please, Don't Touch Anything was released for Nintendo Switch on November 22, 2018, with updated graphics and more solutions.

== Gameplay ==
The player assumes control of the game's main character, who is locked in a mysterious room when their colleague goes for a bathroom break. A control panel is located in front of them, which, despite orders not to touch, they are expected to interact with to progress the game. The player must study the instructional poster in the room to figure out how to manipulate the panel, and different combinations of actions can unlock a large number of different endings.

== Plot ==
The potential endings of the game vary widely, from humorous to the Eye of Providence staring back at the player.

== Reception ==
Reception

Aggregate score
Aggregator	Score
Metacritic	75/100 (PC); 76/100 (iOS)

Review scores
Publication	Score
PC Gamer	70/100
Gamezebo	3/5
Pocket Gamer	90/100 (iOS)
Destructoid	9/10 (VR)
Gaming Age	A (Nintendo Switch, PS4, Xbox One)

The game received generally positive reviews according to Metacritic.

Tyler Wilde of PC Gamer called it an "enjoyable little puzzle box" but noted that it was "not meaningful," wishing its narrative were more "interesting," similar to games such as Papers, Please or The Stanley Parable.

Rob Rich of Gamezebo said the art style was "pleasant," but the puzzles were "obtuse," and there was "hardly any meat to the gameplay."

Alysia Judge of Pocket Gamer UK awarded the iOS version the website's Silver Award, saying it presented "fun gameplay in a neat pixel art package."

Jed Whitaker of Destructoid said the VR remake was a "steal" for the price and that it would make players "laugh and jump."

== See also ==
- Loop Hero, the second game from Four Quarters
