= Loop Hero =

2021 video game

- Developer: Four Quarters
- Publishers: Devolver Digital; Playdigious (Android, iOS)
- Engine: GameMaker
- Platforms: Linux; macOS; Windows; Nintendo Switch; Xbox One; Xbox Series X/S; Android; iOS
- Release: Linux, Mac, Windows; March 4, 2021; Switch; December 9, 2021; Xbox One & Series X/S; April 4, 2023; Android, iOS; April 30, 2024
- Genres: Role-playing, roguelike deck-building
- Mode: Single-player

Loop Hero is a 2021 roguelike video game developed by Russian studio Four Quarters and published by Devolver Digital for Linux, macOS, and Windows. It takes place in a randomly generated world where the player changes the world by placing cards instead of directly controlling a character.

== Gameplay ==
The hero walking one of the game's randomly generated paths

Loop Hero's gameplay is divided into two alternating phases: the expedition phase (when resources are obtained) and the building phase (when resources are used).

Each expedition begins with the hero walking around a randomly generated closed path made out of empty tiles, where slimes can spawn. When the hero meets an enemy, an automatic fight will start. If the hero wins, they receive resources which can be used during the building phase. Otherwise, defeat means the hero loses 70% of the resources obtained during the current expedition and gets sent back to their base. The same penalty is applied if the player decides to abandon the expedition during a battle. Other the that, they can also choose to leave outside of combat. However, if the hero is distant from the campfire tile, they will bring 40% fewer resources.

As the hero kills enemies, the player gets cards such as mountains, meadows and forests. The player can place these cards on the map and trigger several effects. They include restoring health to the hero at the start of each day, increasing the hero's movement speed and recurrently summoning enemies. Placing terrain features next to each other can also modify their effect. For example, if nine mountains are placed in a 3×3 grid, they combine into Mountain Peak and provide additional health; the new terrain also spawns a new enemy type. Aside from cards and resources, beating enemies can also yield new equipment for the hero. These items can be equipped to increase the hero's attack, defense, health regeneration and other attributes. If the inventory holding them becomes full, older equipment is automatically discarded to make space.

The game contains three separate classes: warrior, necromancer and rogue. Each of the classes has their own characteristics, including strengths and weaknesses. The warrior class, the starting one, is a basic mix of attack and defense. The necromancer class is able to use magic and summon undead creatures to fight by their side, but they are also more fragile. The rogue class exchanges the regular mechanic of obtaining equipment after battles for receiving trophies, which are traded for equipment when the hero crosses the campfire tile; the more trophies acquired, the better the items obtained.

Most of the game takes place on one of the randomly generated paths, with the player working to upgrade the hero's equipment and strategically placing terrain elements in an effort to survive increasingly difficult enemies. As the player places landscape cards on the map, the boss meter rises and eventually a boss spawns at the campfire tile. If the hero successfully beats the boss, the story progresses.

The resources gained over the course of an expedition are saved in the hero's inventory. When an expedition is finished, either by the player's choice or the hero's defeat, these resources are added to the cumulative pool. During the building phase, the player can use their resources to construct new structures in their base, such as a kitchen or a blacksmith, or upgrade existing ones. These buildings have their own effects on the hero, such as improving their health restoration with potions.

== Plot ==
The game begins after the world has ended, with the introductory dialogue explaining that an evil lich obliterated reality and all of the things in it. The hero awakens in a small camp on a path and sets out to try and rebuild his world. Along the way, he encounters other survivors who either assist him in trying to reconstruct the world or who, in despair, consider it lost and attack him in an effort to further their own survival.

However, as the hero defeats the Lich and his followers, he discovers that the end of reality is being instigated by God himself, Omega. Omega explains that his previous incarnation, Alpha, created the universe as well as humanity, and took a particular liking to them. On a whim, Alpha decided to descend to one of his worlds to appear personally to humans. However, to his shock and amazement, the primitive human he met attacked him with a spear in an effort to protect his family. Intrigued by humanity's defiance against him, Alpha allowed himself to be killed by the human, and was reborn as Omega, now determined to destroy the universe to re-experience the sensation of death.

The hero battles and is able to defeat Omega, and it is revealed that one of his companions, Yota, was actually the Goddess of Probability who has been secretly aiding him all this time. Defeated, Omega congratulates the hero and explains that it will take thousands of years for him to reincarnate back into Alpha and create a new universe. The hero promises to keep rebuilding his world in Alpha's absence so that his descendants will be ready to greet him upon his reincarnation. Yota then tells the hero that he has the option of retiring to his village to rebuild the world, or traveling to alternate worlds where the hero failed so that he can save them from Omega.

== Development and release ==
Loop Hero was initially born out of an idea the Four Quarters team had in early 2019 when discussing zero-player games; one of their team members built a game with a hero wandering in a loop while the player built around it. They did not do much with this idea until the Ludum Dare game jam in October 2019, which had the theme "Start with nothing". The earlier prototype idea worked well with the theme, though the final game they produced for Ludum Dare did not win as it wasn't very polished. Four Quarters recognized that they had the foundations of a good game, spent more time with the Ludum Dare version and were able to secure Devolver Digital for publication and support. Since then, most of their development had been focused on balancing the game due to the number of different sub-systems within the game. They were able to use a demo of the game offered on Steam as part of one of the first major large-scale balance tests, which they planned to continue after the game's release.

The game released for Linux, macOS, and Windows on March 4, 2021. A Nintendo Switch version released on December 9, 2021. Versions for Xbox One and Xbox Series X/S released on April 4, 2023. A mobile version released for Android and iOS on April 30, 2024. Following the Russian invasion of Ukraine, the developer encouraged piracy of Loop Hero in countries where sanctions prevented purchase.

== Reception ==
Reception

Aggregate score
Aggregator	Score
Metacritic	PC: 82/100; NS: 84/100

Review scores
Publication	Score
Edge	5/10
Eurogamer	Recommended
Game Informer	8.5/10
GameSpot	8/10
IGN	8/10
Jeuxvideo.com	15/20
PC Gamer (US)	83/100
PCGamesN	8/10

Loop Hero received "generally favorable" reviews, according to review aggregator website Metacritic. Critics praised the freedom to create unique worlds and the 1980s aesthetic of the game. Ben Kuchera of Polygon praised the experimentation that the looping system allowed. Ian Boudreau of PCGamesN appreciated how the deck-building mechanics allowed the player to constantly vary their playstyle. Evan Lahti, writing for PC Gamer, enjoyed the surprises that different card combinations could create, although he thought the lack of new ones hurt the later game. Sam Machkovech of Ars Technica enjoyed the game's take on the idle genre, and how the player had to make difficult choices about the hero's abilities.

=== Accolades ===
Loop Hero was nominated for "Best Independent Game" at The Game Awards 2021. It was also nominated for "Outstanding Achievement for an Independent Game", "Outstanding Achievement in Game Design", and "Strategy/Simulation Game of the Year" at the 25th Annual D.I.C.E. Awards. Loop Hero's mobile port also won the award for Best Foreign Mobile Game at the 2025 Pégases Awards.

== See also ==
- Please, Don't Touch Anything, the first game from Four Quarters
