= Forgotton Anne =

2018 video game

- Developer: ThroughLine Games
- Publishers: Square Enix Collective; Hitcents (Mobile)
- Director: Alfred Nguyen
- Producer: Alfred Nguyen
- Designer: Valdemar Schultz Andreasen
- Programmer: Michael Godlowski-Maryniak
- Artist: Anders Bierberg Hald
- Writer: Morten Brunbjerg
- Composer: Peter Due
- Engine: Unity
- Platforms: Windows; PlayStation 4; Xbox One; macOS; Nintendo Switch; iOS; Android
- Release: Windows, PS4, Xbox One; May 15, 2018; macOS; June 21, 2018; Nintendo Switch; November 9, 2018; iOS; June 26, 2019; Android; December 18, 2019
- Genres: Adventure, platform
- Mode: Single-player

Forgotton Anne is a cinematic adventure-platform game developed by ThroughLine Games and published by Square Enix Collective. The game uses a hand-drawn anime aesthetic style and an orchestral score performed by the Copenhagen Philharmonic Orchestra and was released on May 15, 2018 on Microsoft Windows, Xbox One, and PlayStation 4. The game was released for macOS on June 21, 2018, Nintendo Switch on November 9, 2018, iOS on June 26, 2019, and Android on December 18, 2019. A follow-up game, Forgotlings, was released on February 17, 2026.

== Plot ==
Forgotton Anne takes place between the real world and a fictional world called Forgotten Lands, a magical parallel universe where lost objects, called forgotlings — everything from missing socks to discarded lamps — come to life, hoping one day that they might be remembered again and returned to the real world. The player controls Anne, an Enforcer who keeps order in the Forgotten Lands, who sets out to extinguish a rebellion that could prevent her master, Bonku, and herself from returning to the human world. The rebellion is led by Fig, a dress mannequin with a face on their chest, and their ally Bulb, a cloaked light bulb with a top hat. Anne is equipped with a device called an Arca, which can drain the energy (Anima) of the forgotlings.

== Reception ==
Reception

Aggregate score
Aggregator	Score
Metacritic	PC: 76/100; PS4: 78/100; XONE: 83/100; NS: 82/100

According to review aggregator Metacritic, Forgotton Anne has received "generally favorable reviews" across Windows, PlayStation 4, and Xbox One.

The game received nominations for the following awards:

- "Original Song" with "Forgotten Anne," written by Randi Laubek, at the 9th Hollywood Music in Media Awards
- "Best Storytelling" at the 2018 Golden Joystick Awards
- "Outstanding Achievement in Original Music Composition" at the 22nd Annual D.I.C.E. Awards
- "Excellence in Visual Art" at the Independent Games Festival Awards
- "Music of the Year" and "Best Music for an Indie Game" at the 2019 G.A.N.G. Awards
- "Adventure Game", "Best Art Direction", and "Best Writing" at the 2019 Webby Awards
- "Best Visual Art", "Best Narrative", and "Best Original IP" at the Develop:Star Awards
- "Best Storytelling" at the Pocket Gamer Mobile Games Awards

The game won three awards at the Danish Game Awards Spilprisen 2019:

- "Game of the Year"
- "Best Debut"
- "Best Visual Design"
