= Pokémon: Symphonic Evolutions =

2014–17 concert series

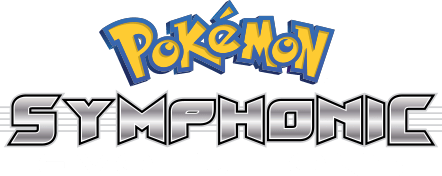
- Conductor: Susie Seiter
- Location: United States, Canada, and Europe
- Start date: August 15, 2014
- End date: May 6, 2017
- Website: http://www.pokemonsymphony.com/

Pokémon: Symphonic Evolutions was a series of official musical concerts presented by The Pokémon Company and produced by Princeton Entertainment, featuring the music of the Pokémon series.

== Music ==
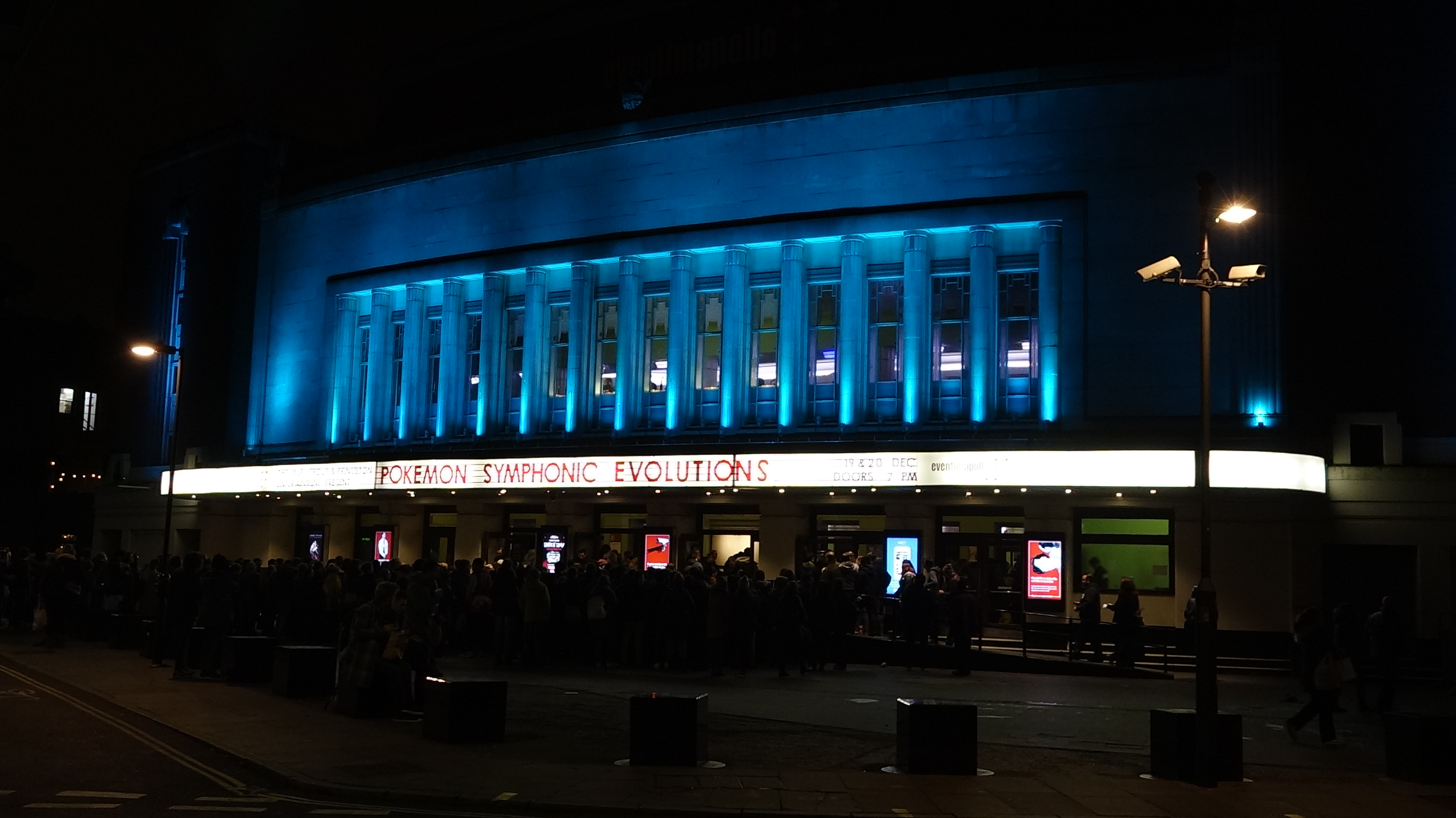
A Pokémon: Symphonic Evolutions concert in London in 2016.

Pokémon: Symphonic Evolutions presents orchestrated music from Pokémon games over the years and other popular songs from the franchise's history, such as the "Pokémon Theme". The name "Symphonic Evolutions" refers not only to the concert program but also to the constant change in the Pokémon series, such as: Pokémon Red and Pokémon Blue, Pokémon Yellow, Pokémon Gold and Pokémon Silver, Pokémon Crystal, Pokémon Ruby and Pokémon Sapphire, Pokémon Emerald, Pokémon Diamond and Pokémon Pearl, Pokémon Platinum, Pokémon Black and Pokémon White, and Pokémon X and Pokémon Y. The concert also highlighted music from the Pokémon anime series and films. The final world performance of the show was at DeVos Performance Hall in Grand Rapids, Michigan, on January 6, 2018.

Concerts have been conducted by Susie Seiter and orchestrated by her husband, Chad Seiter and his co-worker Jeron Moore.

== Schedule ==
Date	City	Country	Venue
August 15, 2014	Washington, D.C.	United States	Warner Theatre
August 16, 2014	Washington, D.C.	United States	Warner Theatre
September 19, 2014	Philadelphia	United States	Mann Center
January 17, 2015	Pittsburgh	United States	Heinz Hall
May 29, 2015	Raleigh	United States	Meymandi Concert Hall
June 6, 2015	New York City	United States	The Theater at Madison Square Garden
June 12, 2015	Cincinnati	United States	Riverbend Music Center
June 13, 2015	Cuyahoga Falls	United States	Blossom Music Center
June 14, 2015	Buffalo	United States	Shea's Performing Arts Center
June 19, 2015	Milwaukee	United States	Riverside Theater
June 20, 2015	Chicago	United States	Chicago Theatre
July 1, 2015 (Note: The show on July 1, 2015 in Baltimore was originally scheduled to take place on May 1, 2015, but was postponed due to the 2015 Baltimore protests)	Baltimore	United States	Joseph Meyerhoff Symphony Hall
July 9, 2015	San Diego	United States	Embarcadero Marina Park South
July 11, 2015	Los Angeles	United States	The Greek Theatre
July 12, 2015	San Jose	United States	City National Civic
July 18, 2015	Vienna	United States	Wolf Trap National Park for the Performing Arts
July 22, 2015	Vancouver	Canada	The Orpheum
July 25, 2015	Houston	United States	Jesse H. Jones Hall for the Performing Arts
July 26, 2015	Houston	United States	Jesse H. Jones Hall for the Performing Arts
August 20, 2015	Holmdel	United States	PNC Bank Arts Center
August 22, 2015	Boston	United States	Leader Bank Pavilion
August 28, 2015	Toronto	Canada	Sony Centre for the Performing Arts
August 30, 2015	Montreal	Canada	Place des Arts
September 15, 2015	Seattle	United States	Benaroya Hall
September 17, 2015	Portland	United States	Arlene Schnitzer Concert Hall
October 21, 2015	Guadalajara	Mexico	Auditorio Telmex
October 23, 2015	Mexico City	Mexico	Arena Ciudad de Mexico
October 25, 2015	Monterrey	Mexico	Arena Monterrey
November 17, 2015	Adelaide	Australia	Adelaide Festival Centre
November 20, 2015	Sydney	Australia	Sydney Opera House
November 21, 2015	Sydney	Australia	Sydney Opera House
December 3, 2015	Clearwater	United States	Ruth Eckerd Hall
December 4, 2015	Orlando	United States	Dr. Phillips Center for the Performing Arts
January 2, 2016	Fort Worth	United States	Bass Performance Hall
January 24, 2016	Pittsburgh	United States	Heinz Hall for the Performing Arts
February 5, 2016	Grand Rapids	United States	DeVos Performance Hall
May 14, 2016	St. Louis	United States	Powell Hall
May 15, 2016	St. Louis	United States	Powell Hall
June 14, 2016	Los Angeles	United States	Microsoft Theater
July 10, 2016	Philadelphia	United States	Mann Center
August 12, 2016	Santiago	Chile	Teatro Coliseo
September 30, 2016	Milwaukee	United States	Riverside Theater
October 29, 2016	Dallas	United States	Music Hall at Fair Park
October 31, 2016	Mexico City	Mexico	Pepsi Center WTC
November 1, 2016	Mexico City	Mexico	Pepsi Center WTC
November 19, 2016	Atlanta	United States	Cobb Energy Performing Arts Centre
December 3, 2016	Miami	United States	Adrienne Arsht Center
December 19, 2016	London	United Kingdom	Hammersmith Apollo
December 20, 2016	London	United Kingdom	Hammersmith Apollo
January 7, 2017	Austin	United States	Long Center for the Performing Arts
March 4, 2017	Salt Lake City	United States	Abravanel Hall
March 9, 2017	Denver	United States	Boettcher Concert Hall
March 31, 2017	Abu Dhabi	United Arab Emirates	The Corniche
April 30, 2017	Orlando	United States	Walt Disney Theater
May 6, 2017	Toronto	Canada	Sony Centre for the Performing Arts
July 7, 2017	Vancouver	Canada	Sony Centre for the Performing Arts
July 8, 2017	Nashville	United States	Ascend Amphitheater
October 8, 2017	Richmond	United States	Altria Theater
November 25-26, 2017	Salem	United States	Elsinore Theatre
December 2, 2017	Wilkes-Barre	United States	F.M. Kirby Center
December 3, 2017	Reading	United States	Santander Performing Arts Center
January 6, 2018	Grand Rapids	United States	DeVos Performance Hall

== Cancelled shows ==
Date	City	Country	Venue	Reason
September 11, 2015	Detroit	United States	Fox Theatre	Unknown
September 12, 2015	Indianapolis	United States	Old National Centre	Unknown
October 7, 2016	Paris	France	Le Grand Rex	Low ticket sales
October 8, 2016	Paris	France	Le Grand Rex	Low ticket sales

== Setlist ==
Introduction

1. Overture
2. Pallet Town (from Red, Blue, and Yellow)
3. Prepare for Trouble (from Red, Blue, and Yellow)
4. Born to be a Champion (from Red, Blue, and Yellow)
5. Ecruteak City (from Gold, Silver, and Crystal)
6. Songs of the Towers (from Gold, Silver, and Crystal)
7. ... (from Gold, Silver, and Crystal)
8. Ancients of Hoenn (from Ruby, Sapphire, and Emerald)
9. Falling Ashes (from Ruby, Sapphire, and Emerald)
10. End of the Road (from Ruby, Sapphire, and Emerald)
11. Dreams and Adventures (from Diamond, Pearl, and Platinum)
12. Routes of Sinnoh (from Diamond, Pearl, and Platinum)
13. The Lake Guardians (from Diamond, Pearl, and Platinum)

Intermission

1. Pokémon Center
2. The Day I Became King (from Black and White)
3. N-Counter (from Black and White)
4. Farewell (from Black and White)
5. An Eternal Prison (from X and Y)
6. Welcome to Kalos (from X and Y)
7. Professor Sycamore (from X and Y)
8. Friends, Fights & Finales (from X and Y)

Encore

1. Gotta Catch 'em All (Pokémon Theme)
2. KISEKI
