= Mages of Mystralia =

2017 video game

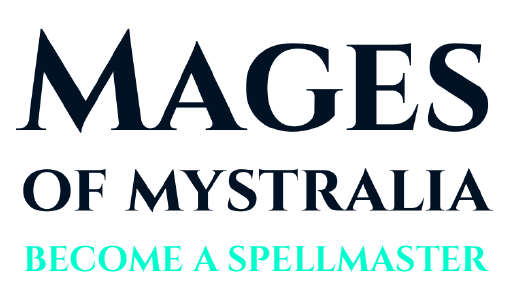
- Developer: Borealys Games
- Publisher: Borealys Games
- Writer: Ed Greenwood
- Composer: Antoine Vachon
- Platforms: Microsoft Windows; PlayStation 4 Xbox One; Nintendo Switch
- Release: Microsoft Windows; May 18, 2017; PlayStation 4; August 22, 2017; Xbox One; August 25, 2017; Nintendo Switch; January 29, 2019
- Genre: Action-adventure
- Mode: Single-player

Mages of Mystralia is an action-adventure video game by Borealys Games. It was released for Microsoft Windows, PlayStation 4, and Xbox One in 2017, and for the Nintendo Switch in 2019.

== Plot ==
The game is set in the land of Mystralia and follows Zia, a mage who discovers her magical powers at the beginning of the game. After being exiled from her village due to unintentionally causing turmoil through her powers, she meets a character self-described as the Mentor, who convinces her to travel to a mage sanctuary to improve her skills as a mage. Zia is eventually tasked with preventing a war between an army of trolls and the anti-mage Kingdom of Mystralia, whilst learning more of her destiny and uncovering a more sinister plot.

== Development ==
Mages of Mystralia was developed and published by Canadian studio Borealys Games.

In August 2024, Borealys Games announced that a follow-up game, titled Echoes of Mystralia, was under development.

== Reception ==
Reception

Aggregate score
Aggregator	Score
Metacritic	PC: 74/100; PS4: 73/100; XONE: 78/100; NS: 69/100

Review scores
Publication	Score
Destructoid	7/10
Game Informer	8/10
GameSpot	6/10

Reviews for the game have been "mixed or average" on Metacritic. Destructoid gave the game a 7 out of 10 calling the game "solid" and stating that it's a "decent adventure with varied combat, cool boss battles, and semi-interesting locales". Game Informer gave the game an 8 out of 10 praising its gameplay, describing it as "engrossing", and calling the in-game magic system as "brilliant".
