= Randi Laubek =

Danish singer and songwriter

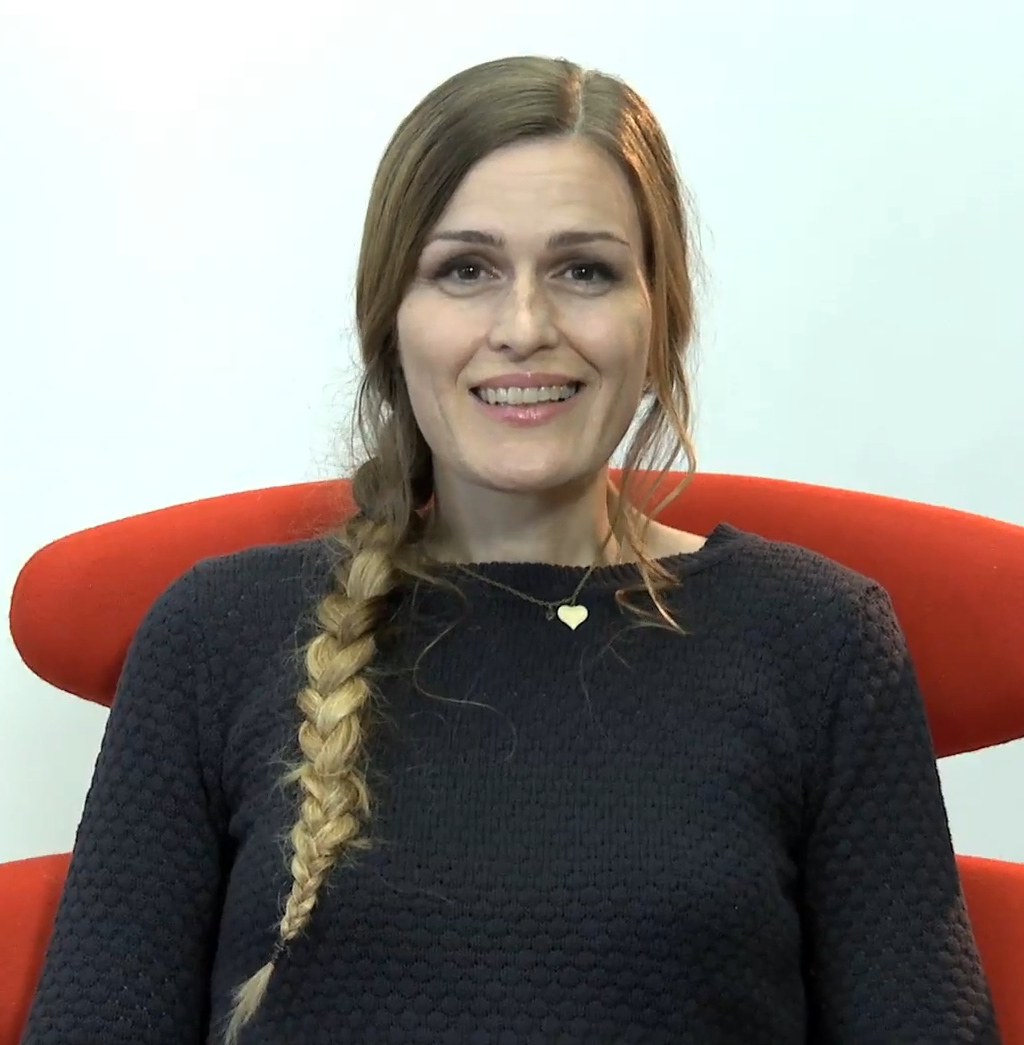
- Randi Laubek in 2016

Background information
- Born: August 30, 1973 (age 51); Voerså, Denmark
- Years active: 1997–present

Randi Laubek (born 30 July 1973) is a Danish singer and songwriter. She made her debut in 1997 with Ducks and Drakes, for which she won three Danish Grammy Awards in 1998, including Danish Singer of the Year, Danish Songwriter of the Year, and Danish Album of the Year. In 2001 she again won a Danish Grammy Award for Danish Singer of the Year and was nominated for Danish Songwriter of the Year. Laubek's song Forgotten Anne, written for the video game Forgotton Anne, was nominated for "Original Song - Video Game" at the 9th Hollywood Music in Media Awards.,

Laubek sang duet with Kasper Eistrup on the song The Ghost of No One from Kashmir's 2001 EP Home Dead.

== Discography ==
=== Albums ===
- Ducks and Drakes, 1997
- Almost Gracefully, 2000
- The Wedding of All Things, 2003
- Figures of Eight, 2005
- Sun Quakes, 2009
- Letter to the World, 2012
- Pow Wow, 2016
- Inner Seas Outer Fields, 2016
