= Erica (video game) =

2019 interactive fiction video game

- Developers: Flavourworks; London Studio
- Publishers: Sony Interactive Entertainment; Flavourworks (iOS, Windows)
- Director: Jack Attridge
- Composer: Austin Wintory
- Platforms: PlayStation 4; iOS; Windows
- Release: August 19, 2019: PS4; August 19, 2019; iOS; January 15, 2021; Windows; May 25, 2021
- Genre: Interactive film
- Mode: Single-player

Erica is an interactive film video game developed by Flavourworks and published by Sony Interactive Entertainment. It was originally released for the PlayStation 4 on August 19, 2019. An iOS port licensed by Sony was released on January 15, 2021, while a port for Microsoft Windows was released on May 25, 2021.

== Gameplay ==
The game is an interactive fiction psychological thriller, wherein the player makes choices at critical story junctures to steer which branch of the narrative will unfold. Erica can be played using a companion app on a smartphone using PlayLink (however, the PlayStation 5 is not backwards compatible with this feature), or using the touch pad on a PlayStation 4 Controller.

== Plot ==
The game stars Holly Earl as Erica Mason, a young woman grappling with nightmares from her childhood and trying to unravel the truth of her family's occult past. The narrative begins with Erica reliving her father's murder and attempting to identify his killer from these visions. When she receives a severed hand in the mail from a mysterious sender, Erica makes contact with the police and returns temporarily to Delphi House, an asylum with which her parents worked when they were alive. There, she meets people from her father's past, as well as several young women staying at Delphi House, and begins to unravel the mystery behind Delphi House, her father's killing, and a mysterious symbol which appears throughout the game.

== Reception ==
The game received "mixed or average" reviews according to the review aggregation website Metacritic. It received an aggregated score of 69/100 from 41 critic reviews. Erica's musical score, composed by Austin Wintory, was nominated for "Outstanding Achievement in Original Music Composition" during the 23rd Annual D.I.C.E. Awards, as well as the original music award at the 2019 International Film Music Critics Association Awards.
