= Ready at Dawn =

American video game developer

Ready At Dawn Studios LLC
- Type: Subsidiary
- Industry: Video game industry
- Founded: 2003; 23 years ago
- Founder: Ru Weerasuriya; Andrea Pessino; Didier Malenfant
- Defunct: August 7, 2024; 2 years ago
- Fate: Closed
- Headquarters: Irvine, California, United States
- Number of locations: 2 studios (2018)
- Key people: Ru Weerasuriya (CCO); Andrea Pessino (CTO)
- Products: Daxter; God of War series Lone Echo series
- Number of employees: 20+ (2024)
- Parent: Oculus Studios (2020–2024)
- Website: www.readyatdawn.com

Ready At Dawn Studios LLC (RAD) was an American video game developer located in Irvine, California that was composed of former members of Naughty Dog and Blizzard Entertainment. Formed in 2003, the company was closely affiliated with Sony Computer Entertainment, developing games in the God of War series and Daxter. Ready At Dawn had a satellite campus in Portland, Oregon, to assist with future PC and console game development, but closed the office in 2022 as they adapted a hybrid work model. The studio was acquired by Oculus Studios as of June 2020. On August 7, 2024, Ready at Dawn was closed by Reality Labs (formerly Oculus Studios).

== History ==
Ready At Dawn was founded in 2003 in Irvine, California, United States by Ru Weerasuriya, Andrea Pessino, Didier Malenfant, and former members of the Sony Computer Entertainment subsidiary Naughty Dog. They released their first game, Daxter, in 2006. The company finished working on their second PSP game, God of War: Chains of Olympus as well as a Wii port of Ōkami, with added motion controls. In June 2008 it was confirmed that the company had ceased developing games for the PSP, and that they had returned the relevant development kits to Sony. However, reports claim that the developer received new development kits after returning. Their next game was God of War: Ghost of Sparta, collaboratively developed with Santa Monica Studio for the PSP, with their new proprietary engine. Ready At Dawn released the God of War: Origins Collection for the PlayStation 3 on September 13, 2011. This collection is a port of their two God of War games for the PSP, Chains of Olympus and Ghost of Sparta, to the PS3 with high-definition graphics, DualShock 3 support, Trophies, and Stereoscopic 3D, the first God of War release to support this feature.

In October 2009, Ready At Dawn began working on a new game engine. The Ready At Dawn Engine is said to be a wholly console-centric platform, integrated with a suite of third-party tools that require no additional license. These tools include 3D content editing, audio, user interface, and asset management systems. In July 2010, it was announced that Ready At Dawn had made thirteen employees redundant, citing difficulties in finding funding between projects behind the redundancies. In early 2012, the company began hiring for the development of a third-person action-adventure game for a "next generation home console game system." Ready At Dawn and Sony later revealed the game at E3 2013 as The Order: 1886.

In June 2015, Ru Weerasuriya, the founder of the company, announced that his position as CEO will be replaced by Paul Sams and will step down to become the company's president and chief creative officer.

In April 2017, Ready At Dawn was in attendance at the large Chinese game publisher, Tencent’s UP Conference, this was to announce a partnership to bring Ready At Dawn games into China. This partnership was headlined by bringing the game Deformers to China, although it was short lived due to the Deformers servers being shut down in August 2018.

In July 2017, Ready At Dawn released Lone Echo and Echo Arena exclusively for the Oculus Rift. Echo Arena has since been included in the VR League, a VR esports segment of ESL, since Season 1. In November 2018, Ready At Dawn released Echo Combat, a first-person shooter DLC using the same zero-g movement found in Echo Arena, and announced that the company had opened a satellite studio in Portland, Oregon. It is to be believed that this new satellite studio is a part of the development of Ready At Dawn’s new project that was teased back in February 2018.

In June 2020, Oculus Studios, under Meta Platforms, acquired Ready At Dawn to develop VR titles for the platform.

In October 2021, Ready At Dawn released VR title Lone Echo II on the Meta.com store for PCVR headsets, receiving an 8.2/10 user rating on Metacritic.com.

In January 2023, Ready At Dawn announced they would be shutting down Echo VR (Echo Arena & Echo Combat) on August 1, 2023, to focus on future projects.

In April 2023, the studio was hit by layoffs, which resulted in roughly a third of the employees being laid off.

In August 2024, the studio was closed due to a series of wide-ranging financial cutbacks from the studio's owner Meta.

== Games developed ==
Game title	North American release date	Platform	Metacritic score
Daxter	March 14, 2006	PlayStation Portable	85/100
God of War: Chains of Olympus	March 4, 2008	PlayStation Portable	91/100
Ōkami	April 15, 2008	Wii	90/100
God of War: Ghost of Sparta	November 2, 2010	PlayStation Portable	86/100
God of War: Origins Collection	September 13, 2011	PlayStation 3	84/100
The Order: 1886	February 20, 2015	PlayStation 4	63/100
Deformers	April 21, 2017	PlayStation 4, Microsoft Windows, Xbox One	60/100
Lone Echo	July 20, 2017	Oculus Rift	89/100
Echo Arena	July 20, 2017	Oculus Rift, Meta Quest	87/100
Echo Combat	November 15, 2018	Oculus Rift	80/100
Lone Echo II	October 12, 2021	Oculus Rift	82/100
