= The Order: 1886 =

2015 video game

- Developer: Ready at Dawn (Note: Supervision and support by Santa Monica Studio)
- Publisher: Sony Computer Entertainment
- Directors: Dana Jan; Ru Weerasuriya
- Producers: Michael Patrick Clark; Anna Nguyen
- Designers: Shaheed Khan; Eric Williams; Robert J. Duncan IV; Gregory Peng; Michael Anderson; Quentin Rezin; Wesley Tack
- Programmers: Garret Foster; Scott Murray
- Artist: Nathan Phail-Liff
- Writers: Ru Weerasuriya; Kirk Ellis
- Composer: Jason Graves
- Platform: PlayStation 4
- Release: February 20, 2015
- Genre: Action-adventure
- Mode: Single-player

The Order: 1886 is a 2015 action-adventure video game developed by Ready at Dawn and published by Sony Computer Entertainment for the PlayStation 4. Set in an 1886 alternate history steampunk London, the game follows the Knights of the Round Table as they battle to keep the world safe from half-breeds, such as werewolves and vampires, as well as fringe organizations rebelling against the government.

The gameplay revolves around cover-based shooting mechanics and features a variety of weapons. The player progresses through the story by journeying through linear paths, defeating enemies and traversing obstacles. Quick time events and melee takedowns are implemented and several collectibles are scattered around the environment.

The Order: 1886 received mixed reviews from critics. Praise was directed at the game's production value, graphics, and technical achievements, while criticism was given for the game's short length, story, gameplay, replay value, and limited involvement the player is given.

== Gameplay ==
In this screenshot, Galahad is attacking a werewolf. The developer adopted a 2.40:1 aspect ratio for the game to make it more cinematic.

The Order: 1886 is a story-focused action-adventure game played in a third-person perspective. The player takes control of Sir Galahad of the Round Table, an order serving as protectors of an alternate history London. The gameplay mostly revolves around cover-based shooting. The game is structured in a linear manner; the player guides Galahad through the environments, following the story. Galahad and his fellow Knights battle against multiple different foes, including humans and werewolf-like creatures known as half-breeds. Galahad is equipped with several tools and weapons for use in combat, such as variations of rifles, grenades, crossbows, and pistols.

Aside from combat with firearms, Galahad utilizes melee attacks and silent kills to defeat enemies. Another major aspect of the gameplay is use of quick time events. The player is required to complete button prompts in order to progress. Several types of collectibles providing lore are scattered throughout the world for the player to collect.

== Synopsis ==
=== Setting ===
The Order: 1886 is set in an alternate history 1886 London, where an old Order of Knights keeps the world safe from half breed monsters, which are a combination of animal and human. Around the seventh or eighth century, a small number of humans took on bestial traits, the majority of humans feared these half-breeds and war broke out. Despite the humans outnumbering the half-breeds, their animal strength gave them the upper hand in centuries of conflict.

Humanity finds new hope in King Arthur and the Knights of the Round Table. King Arthur and his like-minded knights take the fight to the half-breeds, but Arthur realizes it is a losing battle. Through a mysterious turn of fate, the Knights discover Blackwater, a mystical liquid that significantly extends their lifetimes and gives them healing abilities. Despite this advantage, the half-breeds continue to win battle after battle, until the Industrial Revolution turns the tide. Engineers are far ahead of their time, inventing technologies such as thermal imaging, railguns, zeppelins, and wireless communications. New weapons belch electricity, ignite clouds of thermite on top of enemies, and fulfill dual functions as fragmentation grenades and proximity mines. Additionally, the events involving Jack the Ripper have taken place two years earlier.

=== Plot ===
During the autumn of 1886 London is plagued by both attacks by half-breeds and an anti-government insurgency. After fighting off rebels in Mayfair, Sir Galahad (Steve West) pursues the survivors into the Underground where he encounters a number of werewolf-like half-breeds known as Lycans. Galahad's mentor, Sir Percival (Graham McTavish), one of the Order's most veteran knights, suspects that there is a correlation between the two and requests permission to investigate the rebel stronghold of Whitechapel. His concerns are dismissed by the Lord Chancellor, who believes that the Order should remain dedicated to fighting half-breeds.

With tacit approval from Sir Lucan (Matthew Waterson), the Order's Knight Commander and adopted son of the Lord Chancellor, Percival and Galahad undertake a mission into Whitechapel accompanied by the other two members of their team, Lady Igraine (Alice Coulthard) and the Marquis de Lafayette. After encountering fierce resistance they reach the rebel headquarters in the abandoned Royal London Hospital, to find it occupied by Lycans. Galahad and Igraine discover evidence of a rebel plot to infiltrate the Agamemnon, flagship of the United India Company's airship fleet, and assassinate the company chairman Lord Hastings, a frequent guest to the Round Table. The team boards the airship and foils the assassination attempt before a bomb detonates on board. Hastings and most of the passengers are evacuated, but Galahad and Percival remain on board to search for the rebel leader. A second explosion sends the Agamemnon crashing into Hyde Park, destroying the Crystal Palace in the process. Galahad survives but discovers that Percival has been killed.

In council at the Palace of Westminster, Lafayette is knighted and assumes Percival's seat at the Round Table. The Lord Chancellor is highly critical of the mission, asserting that Percival's death and the extensive collateral damage were in vain. The council is interrupted when rebels stage a major attack on Westminster Bridge aimed at killing Hastings, who is saved by the knights.

Enraged by Percival's death, Galahad returns to Whitechapel seeking a confrontation with the rebel leader, who is revealed to be an Indian woman named Lakshmi who is later revealed to be the hitherto presumed dead Queen Lakshmibai of Jhansi of the princely state of Jhansi in the Indian subcontinent. Pleading with Galahad that the United India Company is the true enemy, she leads him to the company's warehouses in Blackwall where they discover a large number of hibernating vampires packed in crates bound for the northeastern United States. According to Lakshmi, Lord Hastings is a vampire (known to the general public as "Jack the Ripper") and is acting in response to the Order's recent success.

At Westminster, Galahad's concerns fall on deaf ears. Lucan sympathizes with him however, and joins Galahad and Lakshmi in infiltrating the United India Company headquarters in Mayfair. They find evidence of a conspiracy to traffic half-breeds overseas and encounter Hastings in his vampire form. Before Galahad can act against Hastings, Lucan reveals himself to be a Lycan and attacks Galahad. The two fight, but Lucan flees as the authorities arrive. Galahad is taken into custody by Lafayette and Igraine, charged with treason, and sentenced to death.

After several weeks, Galahad escapes captivity in the Westminster Catacombs and attempts to flee only to be cornered. Facing re-imprisonment, Galahad throws himself off a ledge into the River Thames and is recovered by Nikola Tesla (Yuri Lowenthal), the Order's armourer with help from an old man. Tesla seeks help from Lakshmi to help take care of him. Lakshmi reveals to Galahad, upon being questioned about her having blackwater, that she was bestowed a knighthood by Sir Bors de Ganis. Fearing that Tesla has come under suspicion, Galahad returns to Westminster in an attempt to extract him. He finds Tesla alive but also encounters Lucan in the laboratory. The two fight a second time with Galahad emerging the victor. The mortally wounded Lucan expresses regret for having betrayed the Order, claiming that he did so in order to save his race from extinction. The two are discovered by the Lord Chancellor, who confesses his knowledge of Lucan's true nature. He reveals to Galahad that centuries before he had fought and destroyed an entire tribe of Lycans, but could not bring himself to kill the infant Lucan, who he adopted as a son instead. The Lord Chancellor orders that evidence of Lucan's betrayal may not be used to exonerate Galahad and must be kept a secret for the sake of the Order. Unwilling to kill his son, he leaves Galahad to administer the coup de grace, then banishes Galahad from London. The two former comrades reconcile, and a remorseful Galahad raises his weapon and fires, killing Lucan, as the screen cuts to black.

In a post-credits scene, Galahad is seen on the roof of a building overlooking London, which has been put under martial law. He is warned by Tesla over the radio that the police could strike anytime and that they should leave the city immediately. Galahad reminds Tesla that he is "Galahad no more".

== Development ==
"I hope people who do like these kind of games [games with short length], do play them. But I also want to be in an industry where me as a gamer, I'm given the choice to do that. I've played games that lasted two hours that were better than games that I played for 16 hours. That's the reality of it. Gameplay length for me is so relative to quality. It's just like a movie. Just because a movie is three hours long, it doesn't make it better"

— Ru Weerasuriya, founder of Ready at Dawn

On June 11, 2013, The Order: 1886 was announced at the Sony Computer Entertainment E3 2013 conference as a new intellectual property for the PlayStation 4. In a post on the PlayStation Blog, Ready at Dawn CEO and creative director Ru Weerasuriya reveled that the game was in the works since 2010. The studio's internal proprietary RAD Engine 4.0 was used for the game's development. On August 29, 2013, Weerasuriya revealed that the decision to go ahead with The Order: 1886 was influenced by Uncharted 2: Among Thieves. On February 6, 2014, it was announced that the game would be single-player only and that the game will run at 30 FPS.

On January 17, 2015, Ready at Dawn confirmed that the game had been declared gold, indicating it was being prepared for production and release. The Order: 1886 was released on February 20, 2015.

A video of the game's full-length playthrough, with a duration of about 5 hours, was leaked online before the game's release. As a single-player only and full-priced game at launch, concern was raised about the value of the game. Weerasuriya defended the game, saying that "it's a matter of quality, not quantity." Technical officer Andrea Pessino responded to the actual length of the game, saying that the game will take eight to ten hours to finish if the player plays it at normal pace and difficulty level.

== Reception ==
Reception

Aggregate score
Aggregator	Score
Metacritic	63/100

Review scores
Publication	Score
Destructoid	6/10
Electronic Gaming Monthly	4.5/10
Game Informer	7.75/10
GameRevolution	2/5
GameSpot	5/10
GamesRadar+	2.5/5
GameTrailers	8.2/10
Giant Bomb	2/5
Hardcore Gamer	2.5/5
IGN	6.5/10
Play	81%
Polygon	5.5/10
VideoGamer.com	6/10
The Escapist	3/5

The Order: 1886 received "mixed or average" reviews from critics, according to review aggregator website Metacritic. Some praise was particularly directed to the game's production values, graphics and technical achievements, while receiving criticism regarding the game's length, story, gameplay, replay value and the player's involvement in the game.

Daniel Bloodworth from GameTrailers praised its graphics, textures, lighting and facial animation, as he stated that "the look and feel of The Order is powerful enough to be worth a playthrough on its own." He also praised the detailed design of characters, environments and locations.

Play gave the game an 8.1/10, praising its satisfying action, high production value, voice acting and dialogue, recreation of 19th Century London and cover-based gunplay. Also praised was the overall amount of gameplay, such as cover-based shooting, stealth and puzzle-solving. However, the weapons were criticized, stating they "[range] from the borderline useless to the ludicrously overpowered". The reviewer summarized by saying that "while a brief yet explosive cinematic adventure might not be what some modern gamers want, it's quite clearly the best way to showcase the true power of a new console just after its first birthday."

Matt Miller from Game Informer praised its filmic presentation, orchestral music, "rewarding" scripted action scenes, variety of weapons, controls, gunplay, characters, environments and memorable location. However, he criticized the low replay value, the story for leaving too many unresolved conflicts and questions, as well as the combat and gameplay which he stated "feels like playing through a long-established template for third-person shooting mechanics." He summarized the review by writing that "1886 goes against the current tide of open-world wandering and emergent sequences, and banks on the idea that players can enjoy a straightforward and relatively brief cinematic adventure."

Brandin Tyrrel from IGN gave the game a 6.5/10. While praising its "engaging universe" and "fantastic atmosphere" and weaponry "packing a creative punch", he criticized the game pacing and gameplay, stating that there is "rarely a moment of interactivity that isn't expressed with a quick-time event", "disappointingly generic cover-based shooting," and "non-tactical gameplay". Also criticized were the aspect ratio, "shallow, slow, and generic quick-time [events]", and linear missions, which he stated "has stripped players away from freedom." He also criticized the totality of content, stating that "there is no reason to revisit the short and stunted single-player campaign once it's been completed; there just isn't a lot to it."

Chris Carter from Destructoid criticized its gunplay, calling it "well-built but standard", and lack of gameplay, writing, "Where The Order ceases to be great is the self-indulgent camera angles and need to focus so much on turning the game into a walking simulator." He also criticized the linear gameplay, predictable narrative, forgettable characters, disappointing boss fight, short length, as well as the lack of replay value and any type of multiplayer. He summarized the review by saying that "I sincerely hope this isn't the last we've seen of this universe, but for now, it's only worth visiting once, briefly."

David Houghton from GamesRadar criticized the limited variety of enemy types, the narrow view of environmental design, restrictive world, basic combat, needless cinematic sequences, unremarkable story and characters, and the excessive use of quick time events, which he described as "the maddening, illogical, pathological need to turn everything into a QTE killing any excitement or sense of control." He also criticized the game for its lack of player involvement and constantly taking control away from the players. He summarized the game by saying that "The Order's archaic, player-detached approaches to interaction and narrative [...] make it a dated and instantly forgettable experience."

Kevin VanOrd from GameSpot criticized the storytelling, gameplay and lack of missions with guns and werewolves which had been replaced with long periods of inactivity involving observing objects and slowly walking. VanOrd did, however, praise the stylish visuals, fun weapons when given the opportunity to be used and the excellent voice acting that was "far better than the material deserved."

Peter Paras from Game Revolution was critical of the game, citing its poor AI, uncompelling story, lack of character development, unenjoyable gameplay, and the length of the game, which he states "overstays its welcome even at less than 7 hours." He compared the game to Ryse: Son of Rome and Heavenly Sword, calling it "a ho-hum action-adventure game that accompanies a console's first-year launch."

Despite the mixed reception, the Academy of Interactive Arts & Sciences commended the visual and artistic merits of The Order: 1886 with nominations for "Outstanding Technical Achievement" and outstanding achievement in "Animation", "Art Direction", and "Sound Design" during the 19th Annual D.I.C.E. Awards.

=== Sales ===
The retail version of The Order: 1886 was the best-selling game in its week of release in the United Kingdom and Ireland, debuting at No. 1 in the UK retail software sales chart. This made it the first game developed by Sony's in-house team to take the first spot in the chart since August 2014. One month after release, the price was permanently cut by 33%. The game was the ninth best-selling title of February 2015 in the United States. Neither Sony or Ready At Dawn have provided detailed information regarding the game's commercial performance.

== Future ==
In 2015, Ready at Dawn president Ru Weerasuriya and newly appointed CEO Paul Sams had expressed interest in producing more entries for the game in the future. Sams said that, although developers wanted to retain ownership to its intellectual property, it needed the approval of Sony to bring the game to market. Ready at Dawn was closed down by its parent company Reality Labs in August 2024. In February 2025, Ready at Dawn co-founder Andrea Pessino stated that the studio pitched a sequel to Sony, but they turned it down due to The Order: 1886's underwhelming critical reception.

The game was referenced in the PlayStation 5 game Astro's Playroom, a celebration of the PlayStation brand.
