= 15th Hollywood Music in Media Awards =

2024 Awards Ceremony

- Date: November 20, 2024
- Location: The Avalon, Hollywood
- Most wins: Emilia Pérez (3)
- Most nominations: Emilia Pérez (5)
- Website: www.hmmawards.com

The 15th Hollywood Music in Media Awards recognized the best in music in film, TV, video games, commercials, and trailers of 2024. The ceremony was held on November 20, 2024, at The Avalon in Hollywood.

The nominations were announced on November 7, 2024. Jacques Audiard's musical film Emilia Pérez led the nominations with five, followed by Blitz and A Complete Unknown, with three nominations apiece. After being discontinued from 2019 to 2022 and being revived in 2023, the category for Original Song – Sci-Fi/Fantasy Film, was again not presented.

== Winners and nominees ==
=== Score ===
Original Score – Feature Film	Original Score – Independent Film
Emilia Pérez – Clément Ducol & Camille; Blitz – Hans Zimmer; Challengers – Trent Reznor & Atticus Ross; Conclave – Volker Bertelmann; Gladiator II – Harry Gregson-Williams; Horizon: An American Saga – Chapter 1 – John Debney; Saturday Night – Jon Batiste; The Six Triple Eight – Aaron Zigman	The Room Next Door – Alberto Iglesias; African Giants – Justin Schornstein; In the Land of Saints and Sinners – Diego Baldenweg with Nora Baldenweg and Lionel Baldenweg; Sasquatch Sunset – The Octopus Project; September 5 – Lorenz Dangel; Thelma – Nick Chuba
Original Score – Animated Film	Original Score – Sci-Fi/Fantasy Film
The Wild Robot – Kris Bowers; Dragonkeeper – Arturo Cardelús; Inside Out 2 – Andrea Datzman; That Christmas – John Powell; Wallace & Gromit: Vengeance Most Fowl – Lorne Balfe and Julian Nott	Dune: Part Two – Hans Zimmer; Deadpool & Wolverine – Rob Simonsen; Furiosa: A Mad Max Saga – Tom Holkenborg; IF – Michael Giacchino; Red One – Henry Jackman
Original Score – Horror/Thriller Film	Original Score – Documentary
Nosferatu – Robin Carolan; A Quiet Place: Day One – Alexis Grapsas; Here After – Fabrizio Mancinelli; Longlegs – Zilgi; Speak No Evil – Danny Bensi & Saunder Jurriaans; The Substance – Raffertie	Super/Man: The Christopher Reeve Story – Ilan Eshkeri; Frida – Victor Hernández Stumpfhauser; Diane Von Furstenberg: Woman in Charge – Allyson Newman; Endurance – Daniel Pemberton; Jim Henson Idea Man – David Fleming; October H8te – Sharon Farber; The Down of Tiki – Holly Amber Church; Will & Harper – Nathan Halpern
Original Score – Independent Film (Foreign Language)	Original Score – TV/Streamed Movie
The Goat Life – A. R. Rahman; Girls You Know It's True – Segun Akinola; Ka Whawhai Tonu – Arli Liberman & Tiki Taane; Mongrels – Hao-Ting Shih & Tae-Young Yu; The Seed of the Sacred Fig – Karzan Mahmood; The Shadow of the Sun – Sandro Morales-Santoro	The Supremes at Earl's All-You-Can-Eat – Kathryn Bostic; Empire Queen: The Golden Age of Magic – Nicolas Repetto; Out of My Mind – Linda Perry; The Christmas Quest – Tommy Fields; The Killer – Marco Beltrami
Original Score – TV Show/Limited Series	Original Score – TV Show/Limited Series (Foreign Language)
Shōgun – Atticus Ross, Leopold Ross & Nick Chuba; Disclaimer – Finneas O'Connell; Feud: Capote vs. The Swans – Julia Newman; Masters of the Air – Blake Neely; Shardlake – Alex Heffes; Slow Horses – Daniel Pemberton & Toydrum; The Tattooist of Auschwitz – Kara Talve & Hans Zimmer	Women in Blue (Las Azules) – Lucas Vidal; Heeramandi: The Diamond Bazaar – Benedict Taylor & Naren Chandavarkar; Terminator Zero – Michelle Birsky & Kevin Henthorn; The Deep State TV Show – Youssef Guezoum; Trade War – Ian Chen, Alexander Wong & Chi-Jou Cho
Original Score – Short Film (Live Action)	Original Score – Short Film (Animated)
Spaceman – Spencer Creaghan & Chris Reineck; Deepheist – Noah Horowitz; La Piedra Roja – Eduardo Andrade; Masks – Alexandra Petkovski; Rock, Paper, Scissors – Marcin Mazurek; Tapeworm – Aleksandra Vilcinska	Fly Hard – Daniel Rojas; Bubble Boy – Umberto Gaudino; Game Over & Over – Jason Lazurus; Honor of Kings – Lei Huang & Zeneth; Samurai Blue: Afterimage – Robert Mai; Student Accomplice – Kevin West
Original Score – Short Film (Documentary)	Original Score – Documentary Series – TV/Digital
Motorcycle Mary – Katya Richardson; Jumpman – Fabrizio Mancinelli; Superhuman Body: World of Medical Marvels – H. Scott Salinas & Tomas Videla; The Turnaround – Ari Balouzian; Unwavering – Christian Heschl; When the Floods Come – Alexander Leeming Froudakis & Manuela Lubrano	Planet Earth III – Jacob Shea & Sara Barone; American Nightmare – Jessica Jones; Mammals – Thomas Farnon; Our Oceans – Ho-Ling Tang; Secret World of Sound David Attenborough – Suad Bushnaq; STEVE! (Martin) A Documentary in 2 Pieces – Darian Sahanaja; The Dynasty: New England Patriots – H. Scott Salinas
Original Score – Video Game (Console & PC)	Original Song/Score – Mobile Video Game
Delta Force – Johan Söderqvist & Zio; Alien: Rogue Incursion – Sara Barone; Avatar: Frontiers of Pandora – Pinar Toprak; Call of Duty: Black Ops 6 – Jack Wall; Diablo IV: Vessel of Hatred – Ted Reedy, Adam Burgess, Neal Acree & Ryan Amon; Frostpunk 2 – Piotr Musial; Prince of Persia: The Lost Crown – MENTRIX & Gareth Coker; World of Warcraft: The War Within – Leo Kaliski, Jake Lefkowitz, Adam Burgess, Neal Acree, Glenn Stafford & David Arkenstone	Honor of Kings – Volker Bertelmann, Matthew Carl Earl, Laurent Courbier, Robbie Say, 2WEI, Zeneth, Henrik Lindström, Martin Landström and Rasmus Faber; Call of Duty: Mobile – Hans Zimmer, Yan Xiaonan, Qishan Zhang, Liu Siqing; Production Team: TiMi J3 Studio/TiMi Audio Lab; Diablo Immortal – Neal Acree, Alex Wu, Hana Zhao & Briver; Justic (Mobile Version) – Yuxia Wu/Yi Xiang; Once Human – Juju Xu/Elsbeth Rehder; PUBG Mobile – LUMi, Kin Lee, Kiddou Guo, Evan Lin, TouRyo, Yuko Zen, LightSpeed Studios Audio Team, PUBG MOBILE OFFICIAL TEAM; Performed by Christina Rotondo, LUMi

=== Song ===
Original Song – Feature Film	Original Song – Independent Film
"The Journey" from The Six Triple Eight – Written by Diane Warren; Performed by H.E.R.; "Compress/Repress" from Challengers – Written by Trent Reznor, Atticus Ross & Luca Guadagnino; Performed by Mariqueen Maandig Reznor; "El Mal" from Emilia Pérez – Written by Clément Ducol, Camille & Jacques Audiard; Performed by Zoe Saldaña; "Forbidden Road" from Better Man – Written and performed by Robbie Williams; "Mi Camino" from Emilia Pérez – Written by Clément Ducol & Camille; Performed by Selena Gomez & Édgar Ramírez; "Out of Oklahoma" from Twisters – Written by Luke Dick, Shane McAnally & Lainey Wilson; Performed by Lainey Wilson; "Periyone" from The Goat Life – Written by A.R. Rahman & Rafiq Ahamed; Performed by Jithin Raj; "The Idea of You" from The Idea of You – Written by Savan Kotecha, Albin Nedler & Carl Falk; Performed by Nicholas Galitzine & Anne-Marie; "Winter Coat" from Blitz – Written by Nicholas Britell, Steve McQueen & Taura Stinson; Performed by Saoirse Ronan	"Beautiful That Way" from The Last Showgirl – Written by Miley Cyrus, Lykke Li & Andrew Wyatt; Performed by Miley Cyrus; "City of Dreams" from City of Dreams – Written by Linda Perry; Performed by Luis Fonsi; "Hold On To The Dream" from Ka Whawhai Tonu – Written by Arli Liberman & Tiki Taane; Performed by Arli Liberman, Tiki Taane & Louis Baker; "Right Where He Ought To Be" from Kim Kahana: The Man Who Changed Hollywood – Written by Richard Lynch & Kenny Day; Performed by Richard Lynch; "The Creatures of Nature" from Sasquatch Sunset – Written by Toto Miranda, Yvonne Lambert & Josh Lambert; Performed by Riley Keough; "Wi Sabi Wi" from African Giants – Written by Justin Schornstein; Performed by Malik Mayne, Patrick Dillon Curry & Justin Schornstein
Original Song – Animated Film	Original Song – Documentary
"Kiss the Sky" from The Wild Robot – Written by Maren Morris, Ali Tamposi, Michael Pollack, Delacey, Jordan Johnson & Stefan Johnson; Performed by Maren Morris; "Beyond" from Moana 2 – Written by Abigail Barlow & Emily Bear; Performed by Auli'i Cravalho; "Can I Get a Chee Hoo?" from Moana 2 – Written by Abigail Barlow & Emily Bear; Performed by Dwayne Johnson; "Double Life" from Despicable Me 4 – Written and performed by Pharrell Williams; "Just As You Are" from Thelma the Unicorn – Written by Taura Stinson, Darien Dorsey & Brittany Howard; Performed by Brittany Howard	"Never Too Late" from Elton John: Never Too Late – Written by Elton John, Brandi Carlile, Bernie Taupin & Andrew Watt; Performed by Elton John & Brandi Carlile; "Growing Up Is For Losers" from Red Herring – Written and performed by Xav Clarke; "Harper and Will Go West" from Will & Harper – Written by Sean Douglas, Kristen Wiig & Josh Greenbaum; Performed by Kristen Wiig; "Mis Cuatro Letras" from Night is Not Eternal – Written and performed by San Miguel Pérez & Chad Cannon; "Pain Has a Purpose" from Americans with No Address – Written by Cindy Morgan & Jonathan Kingham; Performed by Rachael Lampa; "Piece by Piece" from Piece by Piece – Written by Pharrell Williams; Performed by Pharrell Williams & Princess Anne High School Fabulous Marching Cavaliers
Original Song – TV Show/Limited Series	Original Song – Video Game (Console & PC)
"Love Will Survive" from The Tattooist of Auschwitz – Written by Hans Zimmer, Kara Talve, Walter Afanasieff & Charlie Midnight; Performed by Barbra Steisand; "Jericho" from Genius: MLK/X – Written by Jacob Banks & Nayla 'Sillkey' Nyassa; Performed by Jacob Banks; "Let's Put the Christ Back In Christmas" from The Boys – Written by Christopher Lennertz; Performed by Shoshana Bean, Andrew Rannells, James Monroe Iglehart & Christopher Lennertz; "The Line" from Arcane League of Legends – Written by Tyler Joseph; Performed by Arcane & Twenty One Pilots; "The Medium Time" from Girls5eva – Written and performed by Sara Bareilles; "The Power of Two" from The Acolyte – Written by Michael Abels, D'Mile & Victoria Monét; Performed by Victoria Monét	"The People's Cry (Main Theme)" from Avatar: Frontiers of Pandora - Written by Pinar Toprak and Paul R Frommer; "Dawn""ETERNITY" from Delta Force - "Dawn" Written by Jesse David/Harrison Boyd/Kiegan Jones. Performed by Delta Force/Lithium Done. "ETERNITY" Written by Kelly Zhong (SBMS) /BFLo (SBMS), Raymond Hsu (SBMS), Kelly Zhong (SBMS), BFLo (SBMS); "Careless Paradise" from Once Human - Written by Juju Xu/Elsbeth Rehder/hou. Performed by Juju Xu/Elsbeth Rehder; "She Had Allies" from Potionomics: Masterwork Edition - Written by Greg Nicolett. Performed by Caitlyn Elizabeth; "The Cantina Can't Contain Us" from Star Wars Outlaws - Written by Cody Mathew Johnson. Featuring Ya-Ya Melodies
Song – Onscreen Performance (Film)	Song – Onscreen Performance (TV Show/Limited Series)
"El Mal" from Emilia Pérez – Performed by Zoe Saldaña; "Defying Gravity" from Wicked – Performed by Cynthia Erivo & Ariana Grande; "The Idea of You" from The Idea of You – Performed by Nicholas Galitzine & Anne-Marie; "Winter Coat" from Blitz – Performed by Saoirse Ronan; "Blowin' in the Wind" from A Complete Unknown – Performed by Timothée Chalamet	"Ruins" from Emily in Paris – Performed by Ashley Park; "Clincoln McCloud" from The Really Loud House – Performed by Clyde with the Loud Sisters; "The DYC Carnegie Medley" from Choir – Performed by Detroit Youth Choir; "Tilasmi Bahein" from Heeramandi: The Diamond Bazaar – Performed by Sanjay Leela Bhansali
Original Song/Score – Commercial Advertisement
Ram "The Convoy" – Emily Bjorke / In The Groove Music; Donna Karan: "In Women We Trust (Global 2024 Campaign)" – Alexandra Petkovski; Identity V – Side Project; Lovebrush Chronicles – Jason Huang; Peckish – Stuart Hancock

=== Main Title Theme ===
Main Title Theme – TV Show/Limited Series	Main Title Theme – TV Show (Foreign Language)
Masters of the Air – Blake Neely; Motel Cocaine – Swizz Beatz; Manhunt – Danielle Ponder; Palm Royale – Jeff Toyne; Sweetpea – Isobel Waller-Bridge & CHINCHILLA; The Legend of Vox Machina – Neal Acree	Hotel Beyrouth – Suad Bushnaq; La Maison – Yuksek; Mutiny – Rihards Zalupe; My Daemon – Pantawit Kiangsiri; The Promise – Youssef Guezoum

=== Music Supervision ===
Music Supervision – Film	Music Supervision – Television
Deadpool & Wolverine – Dave Jordan; A Complete Unknown – Steven Gizicki; Jim Henson Idea Man – LaMarcus Miller & Livy Rodriguez-Behar; Out of My Mind – Susan Jacobs & Jackie Mulhearn; The Idea of You – Frankie Pine & Marcus Tamkin; Twisters – Rachel Levy	Fallout – Trygge Toven; Baby Reindeer – Catherine Grieves; Masters of the Air – Deva Anderson & Rachel Lautzenheiser; Nobody Wants This – Este Haim & Zachary Dawes; Palm Royale – George Drakoulias & Ian Herbert
Music Supervision – Video Game
Honor of Kings – Jing Zhang, Shuqin Xiao, Corey Huang, Peiyue Lu and Samuel Siu; Delta Force – Sam Yang; Factorio: Space Age – Petr Wajsar; Final Fantasy VII Rebirth – Keiji Kawamori

=== Other ===
Music Themed Film, Biopic or Musical	Music Documentary – Special Program
Emilia Pérez – Directed by Jacques Audiard; Produced by Jacques Audiard, Pascal Caucheteux, Valérie Schermann & Anthony Vaccarello; A Complete Unknown – Directed by James Mangold; Produced by Fred Berger, Bob Bookman, Timothée Chalamet & Alan Gasmer; Back to Black – Directed by Sam Taylor-Johnson; Produced by Nicky Kentish Barnes, Debra Hayward & Alison Owen; Better Man – Directed by Michael Gracey; Produced by Paul Currie, Jules Daly, Michael Gracey, Coco Xiaolu Ma & Craig McMahon; Bob Marley: One Love – Directed by Reinaldo Marcus Green; Produced by Robert Teitel, Dede Gardner, Jeremy Kleiner, Ziggy Marley, Rita Marley & Cedella Marley; Wicked – Directed by Jon M. Chu; Produced by Marc Platt & David Stone	Piece by Piece – Directed by Morgan Neville; Produced by Morgan Neville, Caitrin Rogers, Mimi Valdés, Joshua R. Wexler & Pharrell Williams; Elton John: Never Too Late – Directed by R.J. Cutler & David Furnish; Produced by R.J. Cutler, David Furnish & Trevor Smith; I Am: Celine Dion – Directed by Irene Taylor; Produced by Julie Begey Seureau, Stacy Lorts, Tom Mackay & Irene Taylor; Music by John Williams – Directed by Laurent Bouzereau; Produced by Sara Bernstein, Laurent Bouzereau, Ryan Carli, Justin Falvey, Darryl Frank, Brian Grazer, Ben Hasler, Ron Howard, Meredith Kaulfers, Markus Keith, Kathleen Kennedy, Michael Rosenberg, Frank Marshall, Steven Spielberg & Justin Wilkes; One to One: John and Yoko – Directed by Kevin Macdonald & Sam Rice-Edwards; Produced by Kevin Macdonald, Alice Webb & Peter Worsley; The Greatest Night in Pop – Directed by Bao Nguyen; Produced by Julia Nottingham, George Hencken, Bruce Eskowitz, Lionel Richie, Harriet Sternberg & Larry Klein
Soundtrack Album	Music Design – Trailer
Deadpool & Wolverine (Hollywood Records); Disclaimer (Interscope Records); Palm Royale (Platoon); Piece by Piece (Columbia Records); Twisters (Atlantic Records)	American Horror Story: Delicate: "Part 2" – FJØRA X NOCTURN; Honor of Kings – Laurent Courbier; Prince of Persia: The Lost Crown – Mentrix & Gareth Coker; Skull and Bones: "The Games Awards Trailer" – 2WEI; Star Wars Outlaws – Wilbert Roget II
Music Video	Live Concert for Visual Media
"Out of Oklahoma" – Lainey Wilson; "The Imposible Dream" – Aaron Lazar & Broadway Cast Members; "Get Goin'" – aespa; "Ride or Die" – Alexander James Rodriguez; "After the Finale" – Stefanie Sun; "None of Your Business" – Teezo Touchdown	Olivia Rodrigo: Guts World Tour – Olivia Rodrigo; Abbie Thomas & the Crazy Hearts: Live from Ignition Garage – Abbie Thomas; Arknights: "Ambience Synesthesia 2024 RES: Souvenance" – Sterling Maffe, Erik Castro, David Lin, Steven Grove, Matthew Carl Earl, Obadiah Brown-Beach & Others; Lovebrush Chronicles: "Concert for the Journey and Love" – Composed by Jason Huang; Performed by Budapest Scoring Orchestra; The Adventure of Rhythm – Zain Effendi
Exhibitions, Theme Parks, Special Projects
Braveship: The Live Symphonic Spectacular – Matt Cook; Dreaming Freedom – Tammy Ari; Artists: Kris Bowers, Alex Isley, Izzy Bizu, Pedro Eustache, Brandee Younger, ThatCelloGuy, MB Gordy, Justin Kauflin, John DeFaria, Gary Pinto, Ben Ellingworth, xPropelr (featuring 200 Collaborators from 20 Countries); Halloween Horror Nights Maze – Sara Barone; League of Legends: Hall of Legends – J. D. Spears; Rays of Light – Ben Zeadman

=== Special Recognition ===
Special Recognition – New Media	Original Song – Short Film
Bullet Symphony: Live Coding for Everyone – Yang Zhang	"No Wahala" from Alkebulan II – Written by Matt B, Buguma Mark, Performed by Matt B and Royal Philharmonic Orchestra
