= Hollywood Music in Media Award for Best Original Song in an Independent Film =

American music award

Hollywood Music in Media for Best Original Song in an Independent Film
- Country: United States
- Presented by: Hollywood Music in Media Awards (HMMA)
- First award: 2017
- Currently held by: Guitarricadelafuente, Raül Refree and Lucas Duran; La Bola Negra (2026)
- Website: hmmawards.com

The Hollywood Music in Media Award for Best Original Song in an Independent Film is one of the awards given annually to people working in the motion picture industry by the Hollywood Music in Media Awards (HMMA). It is presented to the songwriters who have composed the best "original" song, written specifically for an independent film. The award was first given in 2017, during the eighth annual awards.

== Winners and nominees ==
=== 2010s ===
Year	Film	Song	Nominees
(2017); 8th
(2017); 8th	Voice from the Stone	"Speak to Me"	Amy Lee & Michael Wandmacher
(2017); 8th	Los encantados	"My Tiredness Hasn't Limit"	Angela Boj, Ricardo Davila and Ivan Ruiz Serrano
(2017); 8th	One Percent More Humid	"Calling to Me"	Nathan Halpern
(2017); 8th	Patti Cake$	"PBNJ"	Jason Binnick & Geremy Jasper
(2018); 9th
(2018); 9th	A Private War	"Requiem for a Private War"	Annie Lennox
(2018); 9th	Hearts Beat Loud	"Hearts Beat Loud"	Keegan DeWitt
(2018); 9th	The Last Movie Star	"To Get Here"	Diane Warren
(2018); 9th	Little Pink House	"Home Free"	David Crosby
(2018); 9th	Song of Sway Lake	"Sway Lake"	Ethan Gold

=== 2020s ===
Year	Film	Song	Nominees
(2020); 11th
(2020); 11th	The Outpost	"Everybody Cries"	Rita Wilson (writer/performer); Rod Lurie, Larry Groupé (writers)
(2020); 11th	Minari	"Rain Song"	Emile Mosseri, Stefanie Hong (writers); Yeri Han (performer)
(2020); 11th	Never Rarely Sometimes Always	"Staring at a Mountain"	Sharon Van Etten (writer/performer)
(2020); 11th	Wild Mountain Thyme	"I’ll Be Singing"	Amelia Warner, John Patrick Shanley (writers); Sinéad O'Connor (performer)
(2021); 12th
(2021); 12th	CODA	"Beyond the Shore"	Nick Baxter, Matt Dahan, Siân Heder and Marius de Vries (writers); Emilia Jones (performer)
(2021); 12th	After We Fell	"After Our Dawn"	Taylor Conrod (writer/performer); Nicolas Farmakalidis, George Kallis, Castille Landon, George Solonos and Ryan Steffes (writer)
(2021); 12th	Belfast	"Down to Joy"	Van Morrison (writer/performer)
(2021); 12th	Four Good Days	"Somehow You Do"	Diane Warren (writer); Reba McEntire (performer)
(2021); 12th	Love Is Love Is Love	"Because Love"	Rita Wilson (writer/performer); Laura Karpman (writer)
(2022); 13th
(2022); 13th	Tell It Like a Woman	"Applause"	Diane Warren (writer); Sofia Carson (performer)
(2022); 13th	A Man Called Otto	"Til You're Home"	David Hodges and Rita Wilson (writers); Rita Wilson and Sebastián Yatra (performers)
(2022); 13th	Everything Everywhere All at Once	"This Is A Life"	Ryan Lott, David Byrne and Mitski (writers); Son Lux with Mitski and David Byrne (performers)
(2022); 13th	The Silent Twins	"We Two Made One"	Marcin Macuk, Zuzanna Wrońska, June Gibbons, Jennifer Gibbons (writers); Tamara Lawrance (performers)
(2022); 13th	Tomorrow's Game	"Stand the Test of Time"	Lionel Cohen and Stefni Valencia (writers/performers)
(2023); 14th
(2023); 14th	Holiday Twist	"I Got You"	Michael Jay and Alan Demoss (writers); Jake Miller (performer)
(2023); 14th	A Good Person	"Stardust"	Cary Brothers and Scott Effman (writers); Cary Brothers (performer)
(2023); 14th	Master Gardener	"Space and Time"	S.G. Goodman (writer); Mereba (performer)
(2023); 14th	Past Lives	"Quiet Eyes"	Sharon Van Etten and Zach Dawes (writers); Sharon Van Etten (performer)
(2023); 14th	Radical	"El Saber"	Gaby Moreno (writer/performer)
(2023); 14th	Sons 2 the Grave	"Don't Forget Me When I'm Gone"	Sean Jones, Michael Shand, and Miku Graham (writers); Sean Jones (performer)
(2024); 15th
(2024); 15th	The Last Showgirl	"Beautiful That Way"	Miley Cyrus, Lykke Li & Andrew Wyatt (writers); Miley Cyrus (performer)
(2024); 15th	City of Dreams	"City of Dreams"	Linda Perry (writer); Luis Fonsi (performer)
(2024); 15th	Ka Whawhai Tonu	"Hold On To The Dream"	Arli Liberman and Tiki Taane (writers); Arli Liberman, Tiki Taane and Louis Baker (performers)
(2024); 15th	Kim Kahana: The Man Who Changed Hollywood	"Right Where He Ought To Be"	Richard Lynch and Kenny Day (writers); Richard Lynch (performer)
(2024); 15th	Sasquatch Sunset	"The Creatures of Nature"	Toto Miranda, Yvonne Lambert and Josh Lambert (writers); Riley Keough (performer)
(2024); 15th	African Giants	"Wi Sabi Wi" from African Giants	Justin Schornstein (writer); Malik Mayne, Patrick Dillon Curry and Justin Schornstein (performers)
(2025); 16th
(2025); 16th	Highest 2 Lowest	"Highest 2 Lowest"	Aiyanna-Lee Anderson and Nicole Daciana Anderson (writers); Aiyanna-Lee (performer)
(2025); 16th	Everything to Me	"Learn to Let Go"	Stephanie Economou, Maggie McClure, Chloé Caroline Fellows, and Jon Monroe (writers); Maggie McClure, Chloé Caroline, and Stephanie Economou (performers)
(2025); 16th	Plainclothes	"My San Francisco"	Emily Wells (writer/performer)
(2025); 16th	Momo	"Time Is All We Have"	Fil Eisler and Sam Ryder (writers); Sam Ryder (performer)
(2025); 16th	Rule Breakers	"We Believe In Hope"	Jeff Beal, Joan Beal and Aryana Sayeed (writers); Aryana Sayeed and The Brooklyn Youth Chorus (performers)
(2026); 17th
(2026); 17th	La Bola Negra	"La Nieve"	Guitarricadelafuente, Raül Refree and Lucas Duran (writers); Guitarricadelafuente (performer)
(2026); 17th	Brother Verses Brother	"Brothers Keep Goin' Anyway"	Ethan Gold (writer/performer)
(2026); 17th	Billy Knight	"Hollywood Man"	Beck (writer/performer)
(2026); 17th	Bloom	"How Could You Leave"	Brandon Jarrett and Amber Frank (writers); Amber Frank (performer)
(2026); 17th	Primetime	"On Video"	Phoebe Bridgers, Jack Antonoff and Christian Lee Hutson (writers); Phoebe Bridgers (performer)
(2026); 17th	The Debut	"This City May Have Chewed Me Up (But It Hasn't Spit Me Out)"	Jesse Eisenberg (writer); Julianne Moore (performer)
