= Once Human =

Once Human may refer to:

- Once Human (video game), a 2024 post-apocalyptic survival game
- Once Human (band), a heavy-metal band founded in 2014
