= Franz Böhm (disambiguation) =

Franz Böhm (1895–1977) was a German politician, lawyer, and economist.

Franz Böhm may also refer to:

- Franz Böhm (director) (born 1999), German film director and producer
- Franz Böhme (1885–1947), Austrian general
