= Kímmapiiyipitssini: The Meaning of Empathy =

2021 Canadian documentary film

- Directed by: Elle-Máijá Tailfeathers
- Written by: Elle-Máijá Tailfeathers
- Produced by: David Christensen; Lori Lozinski; Elle-Máijá Tailfeathers
- Cinematography: Patrick McLaughlin
- Edited by: Hans Olson
- Music by: Chandra Melting Tallow
- Release date: April 29, 2021 (Hot Docs)
- Running time: 125 minutes
- Country: Canada
- Languages: English; Blackfoot

Kímmapiiyipitssini: The Meaning of Empathy is a Canadian documentary film, directed by Elle-Máijá Tailfeathers and released in 2021. The film centres on the opioid crisis, and its effects on Tailfeathers' home Kainai Nation community in Alberta.

The film premiered at the 2021 Hot Docs Canadian International Documentary Festival, where it was named one of five winners of the Rogers Audience Award, and Tailfeathers won the Emerging Canadian Filmmaker Award. It was subsequently screened at the DOXA Documentary Film Festival, where Tailfeathers won the Colin Low Award for Best Canadian Director.

At the 2021 Cinéfest Sudbury International Film Festival, it was cowinner, alongside Franz Böhm's film Dear Future Children, of the Inspiring Voices and Perspectives award.

It was a nominee for the DGC Discovery Award at the 2021 Directors Guild of Canada awards. The film won the Canadian Screen Award for Best Feature Length Documentary, and was nominated for Best Cinematography in a Documentary (Patrick McLaughlin) and Best Editing in a Documentary (Hans Olson), at the 10th Canadian Screen Awards in 2022.
