= Goodbye Golovin =

2019 Canadian short drama film

- Film poster
- Directed by: Mathieu Grimard
- Written by: Mathieu Grimard
- Produced by: Simon Corriveau-Gagné; Mathieu Grimard
- Starring: Oleksandr Rudynskyi; Darya Plakhtiy; Maria Stopnyk
- Cinematography: Ariel Méthot-Bellemare
- Edited by: Mathieu Grimard
- Distributed by: H264 Distribution
- Release date: October 24, 2019 (FCIAT)
- Running time: 14 minutes
- Country: Canada
- Languages: Russian; Ukrainian

Goodbye Golovin is a Canadian short drama film, directed by Mathieu Grimard and released in 2019. The film stars Oleksandr Rudynskyi as Ian Golovin, a young man in Ukraine who is considering whether to emigrate to a new country for a shot at a better life after the death of his father.

The film premiered at the 2019 Abitibi-Témiscamingue International Film Festival, where it received an honorable mention from the Prix SPIRA jury. It was subsequently screened at the 2020 Berlin Film Festival, where it received an honorable mention from the jury in the Generation 14plus program, and at the 2021 Plein(s) écran(s) festival, where it won the Grand Prize.

It received a Canadian Screen Award nomination for Best Live Action Short Drama at the 9th Canadian Screen Awards, and a Prix Iris nomination for Best Live Action Short Film at the 23rd Quebec Cinema Awards, in 2021.
