= Billy Knight (film) =

2025 American drama film

- Directed by: Alec Griffen Roth
- Written by: Alec Griffen Roth
- Produced by: Autumn Bailey; Sevier Crespo; Cameron Burnett; Amanda Kiely; Nathan McGuinness; Noor Alfallah; Saeed Tarawneh; Peter Bortel; Tuan Bui; Josh Clayton; David Gendron; Sarah Sarandos; Peter Morgan; Kirk Martin; Sally Lu; Christian C. Lu; Abigail T. Lu; Christian H. Lu Jr. Benjamin Steinberg
- Starring: Charlie Heaton; Diana Silvers; Al Pacino
- Cinematography: Cory Geryak
- Edited by: Tony Sarandos; Johnathon Pensky; Christian Whittlemore
- Music by: Lesley Barber
- Production companies: Firebrand Media Group; Prominent Productions
- Distributed by: Magenta Edge Films
- Release dates: August 8, 2025 (Rhode Island); January 8, 2027 (United States)
- Running time: 90 minutes
- Country: United States
- Language: English

Billy Knight is a 2025 American drama film written and directed by Alec Griffen Roth in his directorial debut. The film stars Al Pacino, Charlie Heaton, and Diana Silvers, and follows a film student in Los Angeles who searches for the subject of his late father's unfinished screenplays.

Billy Knight premiered at the Rhode Island International Film Festival on August 8, 2025, and it is scheduled to be released theatrically in the United States on January 8, 2027.

== Premise ==
Alex, a film student in Los Angeles, grapples with the death of his father, a failed screenwriter. While sorting through his belongings, Alex finds a box of unfinished screenplays and a handkerchief with "Billy Knight" embroidered on it, prompting him to search Hollywood for the figure behind the name.

== Cast ==
- Al Pacino as Billy Knight
- Charlie Heaton as Alex
- Diana Silvers as Emily
- Patrick Schwarzenegger
- Angela Sarafyan as Blake
- Elsie Hewitt as Suzanna
- Sara Sampaio as Gia
- Diplo
- Rick Ross
- Aleeah Rogers
- Beck
- Billy Zane

== Production ==
The project was announced in September 2022 with Al Pacino, Charlie Heaton, and Diana Silvers attached to star. Production began the same month, with Pacino cast in the title role. The film marks Alec Griffen Roth's directorial debut. As of mid-2023, the film was in post-production.

The film's score was composed by Lesley Barber.

== Release ==
=== Festivals ===
Billy Knight premiered at the 43rd Rhode Island International Film Festival on August 8, 2025. It also screened at the Newport Beach Film Festival on October 18, 2025, and the Coronado Island Film Festival on November 7, 2025. It had its European premiere at the UK Film Festival in London on November 23, 2025, and screened at the Torino Film Festival on the same date. Subsequent screenings included the Sedona International Film Festival on February 27, 2026, and the Omaha Film Festival on March 10, 2026.

=== Distribution ===
The Mise-En-Scène Company acquired worldwide sales rights to the film in November 2025, ahead of the American Film Market.

In November 2026, Magenta Edge Films acquired North American distribution rights to the film, scheduling it for a theatrical release in the United States on January 8, 2027.

=== Marketing ===
Firebrand Media Group led the film's marketing campaign using a grassroots strategy that included a nationwide college tour, with screenings at universities including the University of Southern California. Director Alec Griffen Roth described the approach as booking theaters directly while continuing to engage distributors, and using geofencing to target audiences by location. Roth summarized the philosophy of the campaign as "a million small voices are louder than one big one", with approximately 1,500 participants enlisted to share promotional assets online and around 100 students recruited as campus ambassadors.

In late 2025, Firebrand Media Group launched the Billy Knight Short Film Challenge, an open filmmaking competition offering a US$25,000 grand prize, with additional awards of US$10,000 and US$5,000 for second and third place. Entrants were invited to submit short films built around themes including "Hollywood fairytale" and "redemption through art". Submissions closed on February 14, 2026, with winners scheduled to be announced on the film's theatrical release day, August 21, 2026.

Ahead of the theatrical release, the film's official TikTok account, @billyknightmovie, surpassed 30,000 followers.

== Reception ==
Writing for The Miami Hurricane, Alice Reich said the film "displayed the nostalgia surrounding the love of movies, making it majestical and aesthetically pleasing".

=== Accolades ===
Award	Date of ceremony	Category	Recipient(s)	Result	Ref.
UK Film Festival	November 23, 2025	Best Feature Film	Billy Knight	Won	
Hollywood Music in Media Awards	November 18, 2026	Best Original Score – Independent Film	Lesley Barber	Nominated	
Hollywood Music in Media Awards	November 18, 2026	Best Original Song – Independent Film	"Hollywood Man" – Beck	Nominated	
