= Whiteflag Project =

- Origin: Israel; Palestine
- Genres: World music
- Years active: 2006–present
- Labels: Jazzis Records
- Members: Mark Smulian; Gani Tamir; Zaher Abdul Jawad; Arli Liberman; Aaron Shneyer; Katja Cooper
- Website: www.whiteflagmusic.com

Whiteflag Project is a band of Jewish musicians from Israel and Arab musicians from the Gaza Strip. They are a one of a kind 'world fusion' band formed within the most conflicting areas of the Middle East – Israel and Palestine. Their songs are sung in the band members' native tongues of Arabic, Hebrew and English. Their collaboration as a band has endured many political difficulties as a result of the ongoing Israeli–Palestinian conflict.

== History ==
Year	Appearances
2009	Tour of East Coast of US Universities
2008	Creation of Peace Festival, Kazan, Russia
2008	Amnesty International Performance

== Discography ==
Date	Album	Label
2007	Talk	Jazzis Records
