= Bunnyhood =

- Directed by: Mansi Maheshwari
- Written by: James Davis; Anna Moore
- Produced by: Ashionye Ogene
- Edited by: Kaupo Muuli
- Music by: Marcin Mazurek
- Production company: National Film and Television School
- Release date: May 23, 2024 (Cannes)
- Running time: 9 minutes
- Country: United Kingdom

Bunnyhood is a 2024 British animated short film directed by Mansi Maheshwari. Described as a surreal exploration of a young girl's anxiety, it was produced by Ashionye Ogene at the National Film and Television School. The film premiered at the 2024 Cannes Film Festival, where it won third prize in the Cinéfondation La Sélection competition. It was also nominated for the Student Film Competition at the Academy Award-qualifying Animafest Zagreb. Bunnyhood was further selected for several international film festivals, including the Edinburgh International Film Festival in 2024 as part of its official selection, DOK Leipzig in 2024, and the Ottawa International Animation Festival in 2024. It was also featured at the Mumbai Film Festival (MAMI) in 2024, followed by screenings in 2025 at the Sundance Film Festival, the Clermont-Ferrand International Short Film Festival in the Lab Competition, and the Angers European First Film Festival. Additionally, the film won Best Student Film at the Manchester Animation Festival in 2024.

== Plot ==
The film follows Bobby, a young girl who begins to question her trust in her mother after being unexpectedly taken to the hospital. "Mum would never lie to me, would she?" she wonders, as the surreal narrative unfolds.

== Cast ==
- Nina Wadia as Bobby's Mum,
- Mansi Maheshwari as Bobby
- José Prats as Appendix
