= Mark Smulian =

Israeli-English musical artist

Mark Smulian מרק סמליאן
- Smulian in Switzerland, 2005.

Background information
- Born: 8 August 1957 (age 69); England
- Genres: World, jazz, middle-eastern
- Occupations: Record producer, bassist, lyricist
- Instruments: Electric bass, Upright bass
- Years active: 1970–present
- Website: www.marksmulian.com

Mark Smulian (Hebrew: מרק סמליאן; born 8 August 1957) is an English musician, best known as a music producer and bass player. Born in London to secular Jewish parents, Smulian immigrated to Israel in 1975, establishing himself in the Israeli music scene. He has produced platinum and gold albums and has been involved in the Middle-Eastern crossover music scene, working with musicians from diverse cultural and political backgrounds. Smulian co-founded Jamaà, a world music collective, and serves as the artistic director. He is also the chairman of the advisory board and musical director for Heartbeat Jerusalem, which brings Palestinian and Israeli youth together through music.

As a composer and producer, Smulian has worked with Israeli artists like Mosh Ben Ari, Sheva, and Shotei Hanevua. He has also been involved in various world music projects, including Ras Hasatan and the Thesmophoria compilation.

== Biography ==
Mark Smulian was born in London, England, in 1957 to secular Jewish parents. He immigrated to Israel in 1975 and established himself as a highly accredited producer and bass player within the Israeli music scene.

Smulian has produced platinum and gold albums for a number of internationally successful Israeli artists. In addition to producing, Smulian has had a huge involvement in the Middle-Eastern crossover music scene. He worked with a variety of musicians from both the Israeli and Palestinian regions with artists from a vast range of different cultural and political backgrounds.

He is the co-founder and artistic director of Jamaà a world music collective that represents artists and bands from the Middle East and the chairman of the advisory board, and musical director for Heartbeat Jerusalem that brings Palestinian and Israeli youth together through music.

In 2008 Smulian formally introduced the Lydianstream system that works with the Codes of Behaviour, the mature emotional skills that is an intrinsic part of musical cooperation and transferable to non-musical situations. Smulian delivers lectures, workshops, and master classes for both music and non-musical audiences internationally.

In 2011 Smulian relocated back to the UK, where he continues his musical and non-musical activities.

== Composer and record producer ==
Smulian has produced albums for various Israeli artists that have had success within the world music industry. In 2003, he produced, arranged, recorded, programmed, edited, mixed the album Derech for Mosh Ben Ari – one of Israel's most successful international artists – the album went Gold. He has also produced albums for other successful Israeli acts such as Sheva and in 2000 he co-produced and mixed their album Gan released by Lev HaOlim records. In 2004 he co-produced and mixed the album Searching For Dorot for the Israeli act Shotei Hanevua – the album went Platinum. The song Kol Galgal (The Voice of the Wheel) on the album was a huge success in the Israeli charts. Other productions and collaborations include well respected Israeli singer Meir Banai and one of Israels leading female vocalists Gani Tamir.

In 1999 Smulian built Digihipi recording studio in Israel where he focused on World Music productions. He worked with musicians of different cultural and political backgrounds and mentored them on western musical perspectives. These musicians were of Druze, Christian, Bedouin, Jewish and Muslim backgrounds. He worked with Toot Ard, a band of Arab Druzes from the Golan Heights Israel, and was the co-founder and band leader of Whiteflag Project an Israeli Palestinian band which was a unique phenomenon on the world music scene. Smulian co-composed and wrote the English lyrics for the project on both their albums. In 2008 Smulian was appointed as the musical director for the world music project Ras Hasatan (A Sanai Journey). Ras Hasatan was a musical project that took place in the Sanai Desert in Israel with 50 musicians from all over the world. Complementing Smulian's world music catalogue was the world compilation album Thesmophoria – (Women sing world music). He produced, co-composed and mixed the album which was later released in Europe and Israel and released by D&M productions.

Amongst Smulian's compositional works are composed songs for Bedouin flute Player, Judy Kopelman. Kopelman's project told the story of a Palestinian/Israeli Arab who is trying to become recognised in the Israeli culture, and all the ethnic and racial issues that it encompasses.

In 2007 he composed, recorded and mixed music for theatre Six Actors in Search of a Pilot. A production that involved Israeli Arabs and Jews that focused on the need for mutuality and not conflict. They performed throughout Israel in the Arab and Jewish communities and played on Broadway in Manhattan, NY.

Smulian has also scored for documentaries and films. He composed music for the documentary Masada and in 1990 scored for the news video clip Sadude Hussein. The clip received first prize at the 1991 Brazilian Music competition and received airplay on shows such as Saturday Night Live.

Smulian works with WhatFlag, a band in Bristol, UK alongside playing bass with clarinet player Harold Rubin doing free and contemporary jazz. They perform around the Middle-East and Europe. In 2013 Smulian began working with Amadou Diagne, percussionist and singer/songwriter from Senegal as musical director and bass player. In 2014 he produced the first EP for Rasha Nahas, from Israel/Palestine and continues to produce and perform with Nahas internationally on a regular basis. On a daily basis Smulian continues to work as a producer for varied artists and session musician locally and internationally.

== Bass player ==
Smulian plays upright and electric bass, fretted and fretless.

In his earlier years Smulian played with various acts in the US. He became heavily involved in the local scene and performed all across the southern United States with King's X and recorded an album with him for Atlantic records.

Smulian is the bass player and co-founder of the band Zaviot, an experimental jazz band that successfully toured Europe during the 80s. He composed, produced and edited on three of their albums that were later released in Europe. He recorded with renown saxophone player Dave Liebman on one of the albums. Smulian has recorded on hundreds of tracks as a bass player on many projects as a session musician. In 1988 he was awarded bass player of the year in Israel.

Smulian has toured extensively performing at events such as The Olympic Games, Montreux Jazz Festival, Red Sea Jazz Festival, Glastonbury festival, Nuremberg Jazz festival, KKL Switzerland and more.

== Music educator ==
Smulian was active in the Israeli and Palestinian youth music scene. He contributed greatly to the artistic development of a vast range of musicians from within the region. He mentored young Middle-Eastern Reggae sensation Toot-Ard, Hip-Hop Palestinian act Anger Boys, Israeli rock guitarist Arli Liberman, Palestinian rapper Samekh Saz and pop sultry singer Adi Dagan to name a few.

In the world music scene he arranged the production for events and festivals for youngsters touring Israel from the US and organised bi-annual music performance events for national convention of Masada-Jewish youth organisation, North America of 2000 people. Following in 2007 Smulian was offered a post at the Rosh HaAyin music conservatory where mentored on band development and coordinated various bands.

In 2007, Smulian joined the board of Heartbeat, Jerusalem as an advisor and facilitator. Heartbeat is an organisation the creates opportunities and spaces for young Israeli and Palestinian musicians to work together and amplify their voices to influence the world around them. He presently works opposite a local NGO called Salaam Shalom that is running a program called Proud 2B in the Bristol school system.

Before returning to England, Smulian was a music educator in Israeli ministry of Education. He coordinated and conducted music programs to the first school in Israel to learn on eastern as opposed to western instruments. He taught music theory at the Yamaha music school, teaching guitar, bass, theory and harmony. At Yamaha he worked with string players in guitar, bass, baglama, oud, violin, and rhythm players such as vocalists and combinations of the above. And as the Arts Music Coordinator for a youth organisation called Masada he coordinated workshops for conventions that involved using music as a tool for community involvement.

Smulian runs his music education series through an online school: the Lydianstream music academy. The Lydianstream music academy deals with musicians discovering their own unique voice and is based on the mature emotional skills musicians must take on board in order to create consistently great and rewarding music. Smulian has been taking the lecture to the US universities and around Europe since 2008.
