= Rock, Paper, Scissors (2024 film) =

2024 documentary film

- Directed by: Franz Böhm
- Written by: Franz Böhm, Ivan
- Produced by: Hayder Rothschild Hoozeer
- Starring: Oleksandr Rudynskyi; Serhiy Kalantay; Milosh Luchanko
- Cinematography: Hsien-Yu Niu
- Edited by: Carmela Schönenberger
- Music by: Marcin Mazurek
- Release date: October 31, 2024
- Running time: 20 minutes
- Country: United Kingdom
- Language: Ukrainian / Russian

Rock, Paper, Scissors (Ukrainian: «Камінь, папір, ножиці», romanized: Kamin, papir, nozhytsi, Russian: «Камень, бумага, ножницы», romanized: Kamen, bumaga, nozhnitsy) is a 2024 British short film directed by Franz Böhm and produced by Hayder Rothschild Hoozeer with the lead role was played by Ukrainian actor Oleksandr Rudynskyi. The Ukrainian and Russian-language film explores the human cost of war, focusing on the emotional and psychological impact of the Russian invasion of Ukraine. The film won the Best British Short Film category at the 2025 BAFTA Awards The film is currently shortlisted for the Academy Award for Best Live Action Short Film at the 98th Academy Awards.

A British production, Rock, Paper, Scissors premiered at the Show Me Shorts Film Festival in New Zealand on 13th October 2024, an Academy Award®-qualifying festival. It later screened at several prestigious international festivals, including the British Urban Film Festival, Aesthetica Film Festival, Cambridge Film Festival, and Norwich Film Festival in the UK. It also gained recognition at the St. Louis International Film Festival in the United States, where it was nominated for the Audience Award for Best Live Action Short Film, another Oscar-qualifying category.

The film’s soundtrack has been nominated for Best Original Score in the Short Film (Live Action) category at the Hollywood Music in Media Awards in 2024.

== Plot ==
Ivan, a young man living in eastern Ukraine, awaits an evacuation vehicle with his father, a surgeon in a frontline hospital, as the Russian invasion of Ukraine begins. The vehicle is destroyed by Russian aviation, and Ivan receives radioed intelligence from Ukrainian scouts that two Russian soldiers are approaching their bunker, and that dispatching another transport is impossible.

A wounded soldier gives Ivan his sniper rifle. Ivan sees that there are eight, not two, Russian soldiers. Understanding that he cannot neutralize them all, he shoots himself in the leg in order to pose as a pro-Russian local resident and divert the Russians. However, the Russians are already aware of the hospital's location, and Russian aviation destroys the building along with all the civilians inside.

The film's closing credits reveal that after the destruction of the hospital and the death of his father, Ivan joined the military and was killed in combat in 2023.

== Cast ==
- Oleksandr Rudynskyi as Ivan
- Sebastian Anton as Sergei
- Oleksandr Yatsenko as Anatoly
- Sergey Kalantay as Bohdan
- Milosh Luchanko as Andryi
- Yuri Radionov as Mykola
- Aleksandr Begma as Aerial Commander

== Production ==
The film is a National Film and Television School production filmed in the United Kingdom and Wales. Produced by Hayder Rothschild Hoozeer, with the support of production manager Jade Way, and production coordinator Adrianna Saetta. Rock, Paper, Scissors was shot in summer of 2023 with an all Ukrainian cast and completed in late 2024.

== Release ==
The film had its world premiere at the Oscar-qualifying ‘Show Me Shorts’ festival in New Zealand and its UK premiere at the British Urban Film Festival, both in October 2024.

== Film Festival Selections and Accolades ==
Year	Festival / Award	Category	Recipient(s)	Result	Reference
2024	Show Me Shorts Film Festival (New Zealand)	Best International Film (Oscar & BAFTA qualifying)	Rock, Paper, Scissors	Nominated	
2024	Cambridge Film Festival (UK)	Audience Award – Short Film	Rock, Paper, Scissors	Honourable Mention	
2024	St. Louis International Film Festival (USA)	Best Live Action Short (Oscar & BAFTA qualifying)	Rock, Paper, Scissors	Nominated	
2024	Norwich Film Festival (UK)	Best Student Film	Rock, Paper, Scissors	Nominated	
2024	Hollywood Music in Media Awards (USA)	Best Score – Short Film (Live Action)	Marcin Mazurek	Nominated	
2024	Max Ophüls Film Festival (Germany)	Short Film Competition	Rock, Paper, Scissors	Nominated	
2024	British Urban Film Festival (UK)	Official Selection	Rock, Paper, Scissors	Selected	
2024	Aesthetica Film Festival (UK)	Best Poster Design	Rock, Paper, Scissors	Won	
2024	PTAKH Ukraine International Film Festival (UK/Ukraine)	Best Narrative Short	Rock, Paper, Scissors	Won	
2024	Oakville Festivals of Film and Art (Canada)	Official Selection	Rock, Paper, Scissors	Selected	
2024	Focus Wales Film Festival (UK)	Official Selection	Rock, Paper, Scissors	Selected	
2024	London Super Shorts Film Festival (UK)	Official Selection	Rock, Paper, Scissors	Selected	
2024	Manchester Film Festival (UK)	Official Selection	Rock, Paper, Scissors	Selected	
2025	The British Short Film Awards (UK)	Best Foreign Language Short Film	Rock, Paper, Scissors	Nominated	
2025	BAFTA Film Awards (UK)	Best British Short Film	Rock, Paper, Scissors	Won	
2025	Sony Future Filmmaker Awards (USA)	Best Student Fiction	Rock, Paper, Scissors	Won	
2025	Royal Television Society Student Television Awards (UK)	Best Sound Design	Marcin Mazurek & Bryony Lear	Won	
2025	CILECT Prize (Global)	Best Fiction Film	Rock, Paper, Scissors	Won	
2025	Inventa un Film – Lenola Film Festival (Italy)	Best International Film	Rock, Paper, Scissors	Won	
2025	International Sound & Film Music Festival (Croatia)	Best Original Score – Short Film	Marcin Mazurek	Nominated	
2025	OKO International Ethnographic Film Festival (Ukraine/Bulgaria)	Grand Jury Prize	Rock, Paper, Scissors	Nominated	
2025	Oldenburg International Film Festival (Germany)	Official Selection – Short Film	Rock, Paper, Scissors	Selected	
2025	Filmfestival Kitzbühel (Austria)	Official Selection	Rock, Paper, Scissors	Selected	
2025	Kurz.film.spiele (Germany)	Official Selection	Rock, Paper, Scissors	Selected	
2025	Montana International Film Festival (USA)	Best Narrative Short	Rock, Paper, Scissors	Won	
2025	Shortynale Festival (Germany)	Audience Award	Rock, Paper, Scissors	Won	
2025	Montecatini International Short Film Festival (Italy)	Official Selection	Rock, Paper, Scissors	Selected	
2025	Santa Fe International Film Festival (USA)	Official Selection (Oscar qualifying)	Rock, Paper, Scissors	Selected	
2025	Les Nuits en Or – Académie des César (France)	Official Selection – Tour	Rock, Paper, Scissors	Selected	
2025	Lviv International Film Festival Wiz-Art (Ukraine)	Official Selection	Rock, Paper, Scissors	Selected	
2025	Dallas International Film Festival (DIFF) (USA)	Official Selection	Rock, Paper, Scissors	Selected	
2025	International Film Festival Brussels (Belgium)	Best International Short	Rock, Paper, Scissors	Finalist	
2025	Kraljevski Filmski Festival (Serbia)	Best International Film	Rock, Paper, Scissors	Finalist	
2025	Suffolk Shorts Film Festival (UK)	Best Narrative Short	Rock, Paper, Scissors	Nominated	
2025	Boden International Film Festival (Sweden)	Short Fiction	Rock, Paper, Scissors	Selected	
