= Sasquatch Sunset =

2024 American absurdist fantasy drama film

- Theatrical release poster
- Directed by: Nathan Zellner; David Zellner
- Written by: David Zellner
- Produced by: Lars Knudsen; Tyler Campellone; Nathan Zellner; David Zellner; George Rush; Jesse Eisenberg; David Harrari
- Starring: Riley Keough; Jesse Eisenberg; Christophe Zajac-Denek; Nathan Zellner
- Cinematography: Michael Gioulakis
- Edited by: Nathan Zellner; David Zellner; Daniel Tarr
- Music by: The Octopus Project
- Production companies: Square Peg; ZBi; The Space Program
- Distributed by: Bleecker Street
- Release dates: January 19, 2024 (Sundance); April 12, 2024
- Running time: 88 minutes
- Country: United States
- Box office: $1 million

Sasquatch Sunset is a 2024 American absurdist fantasy drama film directed by David Zellner and Nathan Zellner, written by David Zellner, and starring Riley Keough, Jesse Eisenberg, Christophe Zajac-Denek, and Nathan Zellner. The film follows a family of Sasquatch over a period of one year.

It had its world premiere at the Sundance Film Festival on January 19, 2024. The film was released by Bleecker Street on April 12, 2024, and received generally favorable reception from critics.

== Plot ==
In the wilderness of Northern California live four nomadic Sasquatch—the brutish alpha male, his female mate, her male child, and another adult male. They spend their days exploring, foraging, and performing rituals where they drum with branches in hopes of getting a response from other Sasquatch.

During springtime, the alpha and the female have sex while the other two watch. Later, the group find some berries to eat, but the alpha finds some that have fermented. After becoming intoxicated, the alpha attempts to force the female into sex but she rejects his advances, so he pulls a load-bearing stick from their shelter in an attempt to have sex with a knothole in the piece of wood. The group chases him off and he soon becomes sick after eating a poisonous mushroom. Delusional, he tries to have sex with a mountain lion while under its influence. The following day, the child finds the mountain lion eating the alpha and alerts the others, who chase away the lion; the group buries him.

During summer, the now visibly pregnant female arouses the lone male; he attempts to mate with her but she rejects him. They find a tree tagged with a red "X" and later a road, which they mark with urine and feces out of fright. They encounter another tagged log, this one having been cut down, in a river. The male stands atop it and falls, resulting in his legs being trapped underneath. The female and the child fail to help the male escape, helplessly watching as he drowns. The following morning his body is freed by the current and they bury him.

In the fall, the female and her child come across a campsite. The female activates a boombox; when "Love to Hate You" plays, she and the child are emotionally overcome and eventually wreck the site in a fit of rage. The child throws a frisbee at the female's back and causes her to go into labor. They flee and the female abruptly gives birth. The mountain lion approaches, but she distracts it with the baby's placenta and they leave.

Now winter, they steal a penned chicken and the mother saves the child from a foothold trap. The baby almost asphyxiates in its sleep until the mother resuscitates it. They soon encounter a forest fire and many chopped trees, eventually entering into the town of Willow Creek. They encounter a Sasquatch statue outside the local museum, trying and failing to communicate with it.

== Cast ==
- Riley Keough as the female
- Jesse Eisenberg as the male
- Christophe Zajac-Denek as the child
- Nathan Zellner as the alpha male

== Production ==
In August 2022, Jesse Eisenberg announced his involvement in the film as an actor and producer, with David Zellner and Nathan Zellner directing. He stated to Entertainment Weekly, "In full makeup. In full body hair. No lines, I grunt, but no lines, and I'm so looking forward to this." Principal photography took place in Northern California in 2022.

To help the cast prepare for their roles, Eisenberg brought in movement coach and mime coach Lorin Eric Salm, whom Eisenberg had trained with to play French mime artist Marcel Marceau in the feature film Resistance. Prior to filming, in what was dubbed "Sasquatch School" or "Ape Camp", Salm worked with the actors to explore Sasquatch behavior and to establish consistent movement for the creatures so that they would all appear to be of the same species. Drawing inspiration both from primates and from Bigfoot lore, he helped them find a balance between human and ape-like movement. The work included creating a walk, learning animal behavior, developing non-verbal emotional expression, and exploring how a Sasquatch might interact with unfamiliar objects. The movement sessions also focused on nuances of daily Sasquatch life and their manner of eating, and it was during this training period when their vocalizations and forms of communication were chosen.

== Release ==
Sasquatch Sunset had its world premiere at the Sundance Film Festival on January 19, 2024. Prior to this Bleecker Street acquired distribution rights to the film. It also screened at the 74th Berlin International Film Festival on February 19, 2024, as part of the Berlinale Special section, and South by Southwest on March 11, 2024. The film was selected for the MAMI Mumbai Film Festival 2024 under the World Cinema section.

It was released in limited theaters in the United States on April 12, 2024, before going wide a week later. In the UK it was released by Icon Film Distribution on June 14, 2024.

In April 2024, Nathan Zellner appeared in Central Park in the full sasquatch suit. This was claimed by Zellner to be a "social experiment" rather than a publicity stunt.

== Reception ==
=== Critical response ===
On the review aggregator website Rotten Tomatoes, 71% of 148 critics' reviews are positive, with an average rating of 6.6/10. The website's consensus reads: "For audiences attuned to the Zellners' utterly unique wavelength, Sasquatch Sunset offers a moving—if often inscrutable—look at our relationship with the natural world." Metacritic, which uses a weighted average, assigned the film a score of 66 out of 100, based on 42 critics, indicating "generally favorable" reviews.

In his review, investigator Benjamin Radford describes how the movie incorporates "some common Bigfoot tropes and (alleged) evidence, including the reported behavior of beating on trees and howling to communicate. We also see them burying their dead, which is often offered as a convenient excuse by Bigfoot believers when asked to explain why no Sasquatch bones or skeletons have been found."

=== Accolades ===
Award	Date of ceremony	Category	Recipient(s)	Result	Ref.
Hollywood Music in Media Awards	November 20, 2024	Best Original Score – Independent Film	The Octopus Project	Nominated	
Hollywood Music in Media Awards	November 20, 2024	Original Song – Independent Film	Toto Miranda, Yvonne Lambert & Josh Lambert ("The Creatures of Nature")	Nominated	
Austin Film Critics Association	January 6, 2025	Best Austin Film 2024	Sasquatch Sunset	Nominated	
