= Marcin Mazurek =

Polish composer (born 1998)

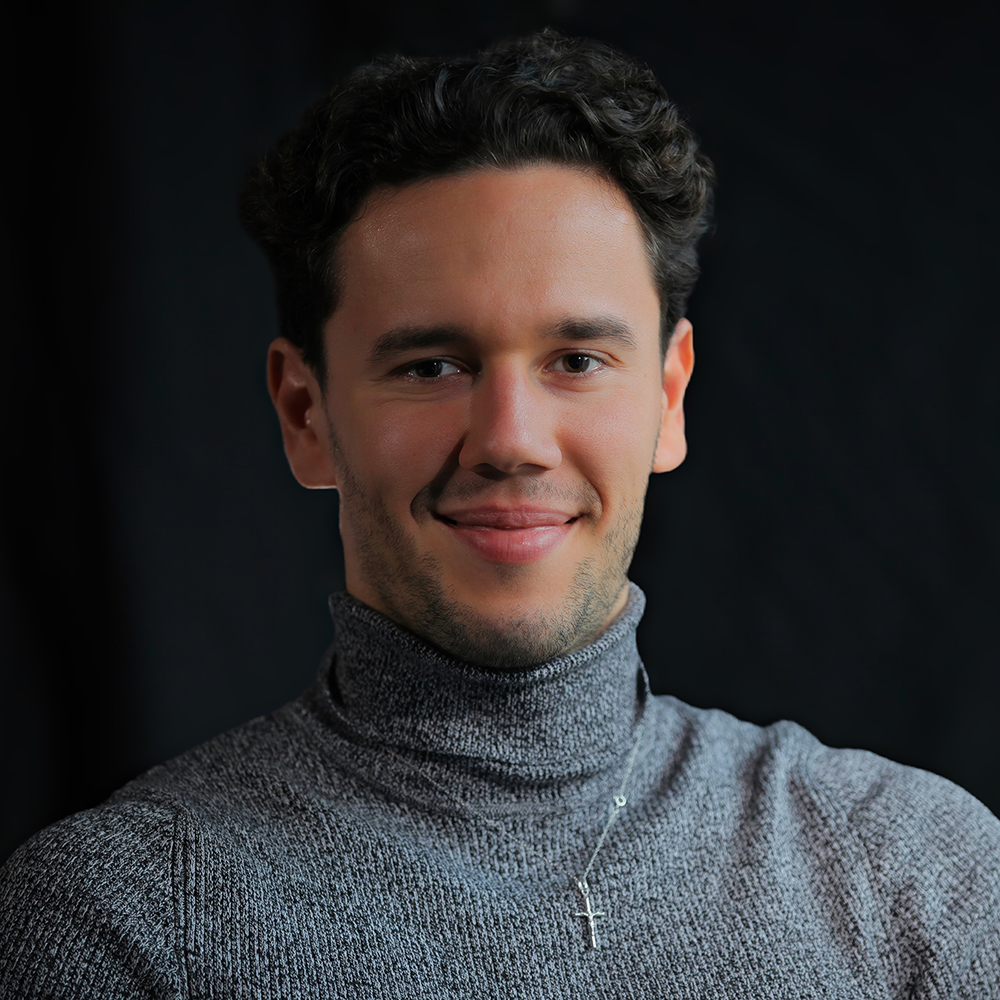

Background information
- Born: 1998 (age 27–28); Kraków, Poland
- Genres: Film scores, electronic
- Occupations: Composer; music producer
- Years active: 2017–present
- Website: https://marcin-mazurek.com

Marcin Mazurek (Polish pronunciation: [ˈmar.t͡ɕin maˈzu.rɛk]) (born 1998) is a Polish composer for film, television, and games, based in London, UK. A graduate of the National Film and Television School (NFTS), he is recognized for scoring award-winning and nominated short films. His work on Rock, Paper, Scissors earned a nomination for Best Score in the Short Film (Live Action) category at the Hollywood Music in Media Awards and contributed to its win for Best British Short Film at the 2025 BAFTA Awards. Together with Bryony Lear, he received the Royal Television Society's Craft Skills: Sound award for their work on Rock, Paper, Scissors at the 2025 RTS Student Television Awards. Marcin also scored Bunnyhood, which won 3rd Prize in the La Cinef category at the Cannes Film Festival and was selected for the Sundance Film Festival in 2025. He also scored Hungry for Freedom, nominated for a Grierson Award in 2024 and an IDA Documentary Award in 2023, as well as The Nobody, selected for the BFI London Film Festival in 2024.
