= Club Zero =

2023 film by Jessica Hausner

- Theatrical release poster
- Directed by: Jessica Hausner
- Written by: Jessica Hausner; Géraldine Bajard
- Produced by: Philippe Bober; Bruno Wagner; Mike Goodrige; Johannes Schubert
- Starring: Mia Wasikowska; Mathieu Demy; Elsa Zylberstein; Amir El-Masry; Sidse Babett Knudsen
- Cinematography: Martin Gschlacht
- Edited by: Karina Ressler
- Music by: Markus Binder
- Production companies: Coop99; Coproduction Office; Essential Films; Parisienne; Paloma Productions; Cinema Intuile; Gold Rush Films
- Distributed by: BAC Films (France); Filmladen (Austria); Neue Visionen (Germany); Camera Film (Denmark); Yume Pictures (United Kingdom)
- Release dates: 22 May 2023 (Cannes); 27 September 2023 (France); 17 November 2023 (Austria); 28 March 2024 (Germany); 27 June 2024 (Denmark)
- Running time: 110 minutes
- Countries: Austria; United Kingdom; Germany; France; Denmark
- Language: English
- Box office: $180,680

Club Zero is a 2023 dark comedy thriller film, directed and produced by Jessica Hausner, from a screenplay by Hausner and Géraldine Bajard. It stars Mia Wasikowska, Mathieu Demy, Elsa Zylberstein, Amir El-Masry, and Sidse Babett Knudsen. The film was an international co-production between companies in Austria, United Kingdom, Germany, France and Denmark.

The film was selected to compete for the Palme d'Or at the 76th Cannes Film Festival, where it had its world premiere on 22 May 2023.

== Plot ==
A teacher at an elite school forms a bond with five students, which takes a shocking turn when their approach to conscious eating goes too far.

== Cast ==
- Mia Wasikowska as Miss Novak
- Sidse Babett Knudsen as Miss Dorset
- Elsa Zylberstein as Elsa's mother
- Mathieu Demy as Elsa's father
- Luke Barker as Fred
- Ksenia Devriendt as Elsa
- Florence Baker as Ragna
- Samuel D. Anderson as Ben
- Gwen Currant as Helen
- Andrei Hozoc as Corbinian
- Sade McNichols-Thomas as Joan
- Amir El-Masry as Mr. Dahl
- Amanda Lawrence as Miss Benedict
- Sam Hoare as Fred's father
- Keeley Forsyth as Ragna's mother
- Lukas Turtur as Ragna's father
- Camilla Rutherford as Fred's mother
- Laoisha O'Callaghan as Helen's mother
- Isabel Lamers as Fred's Doctor

== Production ==
In February 2022, it was reported that Mia Wasikowska joined the cast of the film, with Jessica Hausner directing and producing from a screenplay by herself and Géraldine Bajard. In August 2022, Sidse Babett Knudsen, Amir El-Masry, Mathieu Demy, Elsa Zylberstein, Luke Barker, Amanda Lawrence, Sam Hoare, Keeley Forsyth, Lukas Turtur, Camilla Rutherford, Samuel D. Anderson, Florence Baker, Ksenia Devriendt and Gwen Currant joined the cast of the film.

Principal photography began in Oxford on 25 July 2022 for a planned six-week shoot, before moving to Austria for a further two weeks.

== Release ==
The film was selected to compete for the Palme d'Or at the 76th Cannes Film Festival, where it had its world premiere on 22 May 2023. It is slated to have its North American premiere at the 2023 Calgary International Film Festival, in the International Narrative Competition lineup. It was also invited at the 28th Busan International Film Festival in 'World Cinema' section and was screened on 7 October 2023.

It was released in France by BAC Films on 27 September 2023, in Austria by Filmladen on 17 November 2023, in Germany by Neue Visionen on 28 March 2024 and in Denmark by Camera Film on 27 June 2024. The film was given a limited release in the United States by Film Movement starting on 15 March 2024 at IFC Center in New York City.

== Reception ==
=== Critical response ===
On Rotten Tomatoes, the film holds an approval rating of 65% based on 68 reviews, with an average rating of 6.1/10. The website's consensus reads: "With Club Zero, writer-director Jessica Hausner uses satire to explore an array of ambitious ideas, and the results are fitfully striking even if they don't consistently cohere." On Metacritic, the film has a weighted average score of 57 out of 100, based on 14 critic reviews, indicating "mixed or average" reviews.

=== Accolades ===
Award	Date of ceremony	Category	Recipient(s)	Result	Ref.
Cannes Film Festival	27 May 2023	Palme d'Or	Jessica Hausner	Nominated	
Munich Film Festival	1 July 2023	Best International Film	Club Zero	Nominated	
Palić European Film Festival	21 July 2023	Best Film	Club Zero	Nominated	
Palić European Film Festival	21 July 2023	Special Mention	Markus Binder	Won	
Manaki Brothers Film Festival	29 September 2023	Golden Camera 300	Martin Gschlacht	Nominated	
Sitges Film Festival	15 October 2023	Best Film	Club Zero	Nominated	
Sitges Film Festival	15 October 2023	Best Music	Markus Binder	Won	
European Film Awards	9 December 2023	European Original Score	Markus Binder	Won	
Austrian Film Awards	5 June 2024	Best Feature Film	Club Zero	Nominated	
Austrian Film Awards	5 June 2024	Best Casting	Lucy Pardee	Nominated	
Austrian Film Awards	5 June 2024	Best Makeup	Heiko Schmidt and Kerstin Gaecklein	Nominated	
