= Patrick McLaughlin (cinematographer) =

Canadian cinematographer

Patrick McLaughlin is a Canadian cinematographer. He is most noted for his work on the films Everything Will Be, for which he won the Canadian Screen Award for Best Cinematography in a Documentary at the 3rd Canadian Screen Awards in 2015, and Kímmapiiyipitssini: The Meaning of Empathy, for which he was a shortlisted finalist in the same category at the 10th Canadian Screen Awards in 2022.
