= Hollywood Music in Media Award for Best Original Score in an Independent Film =

HMMA award for Best Original Score in Independent Film

Hollywood Music in Media for Best Original Score in an Independent Film
- Country: United States
- Presented by: Hollywood Music in Media Awards (HMMA)
- First award: 2015
- Currently held by: Raül Refree; La Bola Negra (2026)
- Website: www.hmmawards.com

The Hollywood Music in Media Award for Best Original Score in an Independent Film is one of the awards given annually to people working in the motion picture industry by the Hollywood Music in Media Awards (HMMA).

== History ==
It is presented to the composers who have composed the best "original" score, written specifically for an independent film. The award was first given in 2015, during the sixth annual awards. It was first awarded to independent short film, but gradually shifted to full-length features.

== Winners and nominees ==
=== 2010s ===
Year	Film	Nominees
(2015); 6th
(2015); 6th	The Moment I Was Alone	Isaias Garcia
(2015); 6th	Flying South	Mark Cyprian Smythe
(2015); 6th	Labyrinth	Ramesh Kumar Kannan
(2015); 6th	L´Altra Frontera	Luc Suarez
(2015); 6th	Land Of Leopold	Alexis Grapsas
(2015); 6th	Le Constructeur de Malheur	Raphael Fimm
(2016); 7th
(2016); 7th	The Curse of Sleeping Beauty	Scott Glasgow
(2016); 7th	The Carer	Atti Pacsay
(2016); 7th	Mr. Church	Mark Isham
(2016); 7th	Quarries	Isaias Garcia
(2016); 7th	The Roots of Men	Nicolas Techer
(2017); 8th
(2017); 8th	Chuck	Corey Allen Jackson
(2017); 8th	The Mad Whale	Layla Minoui
(2017); 8th	Purgatory Road	Glen Gabriel
(2017); 8th	This Beautiful Fantastic	Anne Nikitin
(2017); 8th	This Day Forward	Nami Melumad
(2017); 8th	Unfallen	Mark Smythe
(2018); 9th
(2018); 9th	Colette	Thomas Adès
(2018); 9th	Breath	Harry Gregson-Williams
(2018); 9th	The Death of Stalin	Christopher Willis
(2018); 9th	The Last Movie Star	Austin Wintory
(2018); 9th	Mandy	Jóhann Jóhannsson
(2018); 9th	Miss Arizona	Nami Melumad
(2019); 10th
(2019); 10th	Colewell	Dara Taylor
(2019); 10th	Encounter	Penka Kouneva
(2019); 10th	Epiphany	Nuno Malo
(2019); 10th	In This Grey Place	Miro Kepinski
(2019); 10th	Indigo Valley	Dalal Bruchmann & Maesa Pullman

=== 2020s ===
Year	Film	Nominees
(2020); 11th
(2020); 11th	Minari	Emile Mosseri
(2020); 11th	The 24th	Alex Heffes
(2020); 11th	Ammonite	Dustin O'Halloran & Volker Bertelmann
(2020); 11th	The Glorias	Elliot Goldenthal
(2020); 11th	Shirley	Tamar-kali
(2020); 11th	Wild Mountain Thyme	Amelia Warner
(2021); 12th
(2021); 12th	C'mon C'mon	Bryce & Aaron Dessner
(2021); 12th	The Card Counter	Robert Levon Been & Giancarlo Vulcano
(2021); 12th	CODA	Marius de Vries
(2021); 12th	The Green Knight	Daniel Hart
(2021); 12th	Nine Days	Antônio Pinto
(2022); 13th
(2022); 13th	Living	Emilie Levienaise-Farrouch
(2022); 13th	Dead for a Dollar	Xander Rodzinski
(2022); 13th	Don't Make Me Go	Jessica Weiss
(2022); 13th	Everything Everywhere All at Once	Son Lux
(2022); 13th	The Outfit	Alexandre Desplat
(2022); 13th	The Whale	Rob Simonsen
(2023); 14th
(2023); 14th	The Zone of Interest	Mica Levi
(2023); 14th	Dalíland	Edmund Butt
(2023); 14th	Dream Scenario	Owen Pallett
(2023); 14th	Jules	Volker Bertelmann
(2023); 14th	Miranda's Victim	Holly Amber Church
(2023); 14th	She Came to Me	Bryce Dessner
(2024); 15th
(2024); 15th	The Room Next Door	Alberto Iglesias
(2024); 15th	African Giants	Justin Schornstein
(2024); 15th	In the Land of Saints and Sinners	Diego Baldenweg with Nora Baldenweg and Lionel Baldenweg
(2024); 15th	Sasquatch Sunset	The Octopus Project
(2024); 15th	September 5	Lorenz Dangel
(2024); 15th	Thelma	Nick Chuba
(2025); 16th
(2025); 16th	Rule Breakers	Jeff Beal
(2025); 16th	Truth & Treason	Aaron Zigman
(2025); 16th	The Ballad of Wallis Island	Adem Ilhan
(2025); 16th	Rental Family	Jónsi and Alex Somers
(2025); 16th	Rabbit Trap	Lucrecia Dalt
(2025); 16th	Wet Paper Bag	Steve Gernes
(2026); 17th
(2026); 17th	La Bola Negra	Raül Refree
(2026); 17th	Billy Knight	Lesley Barber
(2026); 17th	Primetime	Ari Balouzian
(2026); 17th	The Drama	Daniel Pemberton
(2026); 17th	The Incomer	Tom Kingston
(2026); 17th	The Invite	Devonté Hynes
(2026); 17th	Wicker	Anna Meredith
