= Gundam (film) =

Upcoming film by Jim Mickle

- Directed by: Jim Mickle
- Written by: Jim Mickle
- Based on: Mobile Suit Gundam by: Hajime Yatate; Yoshiyuki Tomino
- Produced by: Cale Boyter; Enzo Marc; Jim Mickle; Linda Moran; Naohiroshi Ogata; Mary Parent; Sydney Sweeney; Noah Centineo
- Starring: Sydney Sweeney; Noah Centineo; Michael Mando; Shioli Kutsuna; Gemma Chua-Tran; Nonso Anozie; Javon Walton; Oleksandr Rudynskyi; Jason Isaacs
- Cinematography: Jess Hall
- Edited by: Jack Dowley; Sam Bollinger
- Production companies: Legendary Pictures; Bandai Namco Filmworks; Nightshade
- Distributed by: Netflix
- Release date: 2027
- Countries: Japan; United States
- Language: English

Gundam is an upcoming military science fiction action space opera film written and directed by Jim Mickle. The film is based on the 1979–80 mecha anime series Mobile Suit Gundam created by Hajime Yatate and Yoshiyuki Tomino. It stars Sydney Sweeney and Noah Centineo, who also are the producers of the film, alongside Michael Mando, Shioli Kutsuna, Gemma Chua-Tran, Nonso Anozie, Javon Walton, Oleksandr Rudynskyi, and Jason Isaacs.

== Premise ==
As shifting allegiances and a growing threat set them on a collision course for one another, two opposing factions are pulled into a high-stakes race across the stars that could define the fate of humanity.

== Cast ==
- Sydney Sweeney
- Noah Centineo
- Michael Mando
- Shioli Kutsuna
- Gemma Chua-Tran
- Nonso Anozie
- Javon Walton
- Oleksandr Rudynskyi
- Jason Isaacs
- Ida Brooke
- Jackson White

== Production ==
In July 2018, it was announced that a live-action adaptation of the anime series Mobile Suit Gundam was in development from Legendary Entertainment alongside the studio for the original series, Sunrise, with Cale Boyter overseeing the project. In April 2021, it was announced that Jordan Vogt-Roberts was attached to direct and produce the film, with Brian K. Vaughan set to write the screenplay and executive produce, under his overall deal at Legendary, and Netflix distributing worldwide on their streaming service, while Legendary distributes theatrically in China. Later in November of that year, Legendary revealed a first-look of the film, in the form of concept art showcasing the original RX-78-2 Gundam suit.

In late October 2024, Vogt-Roberts and Netflix were no longer involved with the film, with Jim Mickle now hired to write and direct. In January 2026, distribution rights to the film were re-acquired by Netflix.

=== Casting ===
In late March 2025, Sydney Sweeney was cast in the lead role. In September, Benson Boone was in talks to co-star opposite Sweeney. In November, Noah Centineo was cast over Boone and Drew Starkey. In February 2026, Jason Clarke joined the cast. In March, Michael Mando, Shioli Kutsuna, and Gemma Chua-Tran joined the cast while Clarke dropped out. In April, Nonso Anozie, Javon Walton, Oleksandr Rudynskyi, Jason Isaacs, and Ida Brooke rounded out the cast. In July, Jackson White was announced to have joined the cast.

=== Filming ===
Principal photography began on April 20, 2026, in Queensland, Australia, on the Gold Coast, Brisbane and Toowoomba under the working title Teardrop, and wrapped on July 21.

=== Post-production ===
Jack Dowley and Sam Bollinger will serve as editors on the film.

== Release ==
Gundam is expected to be released in 2027.
