= Dear Future Children =

2021 documentary film

- Film poster 2021
- Directed by: Franz Böhm
- Produced by: Ansgar Wörner; Johannes Schubert; Connor O'Hara; Jamie Gamache; Jennie Scott; Nico Gerspacher; Fabian Lieb
- Cinematography: Friedemann Leis
- Edited by: Daniela Schramm Moura
- Music by: Hannes Bieber; Leonard Küßner
- Release date: 18 January 2021
- Running time: 89 minutes
- Countries: Germany; United Kingdom; Austria
- Language: English

Dear Future Children is a 2021 documentary film directed by Franz Böhm about young activism worldwide. The German-British-Austrian co-production provides insights into the lives of three young activists from Hong Kong, Uganda and Chile and examines the impact on their daily lives. The film premiered on 18 January 2021 at the 42nd Max Ophüls Prize Film Festival, which was held online due to the COVID-19 pandemic.

== Synopsis ==
The film explores the challenges and motivations of activism to recognize what drives activists and studies the modern organization of protest movements. The project follows activists on the protests in Hong Kong against the Beijing-influenced administration under Carrie Lam, the protests in Chile against social inequality in the country, in Uganda at the local Fridays for Future protests and actions for climate justice and on the C40 World Mayors Summit 2019 in Copenhagen.

== Background ==
In an interview with the Haus des Dokumentarfilms, director Franz Böhm explains that the idea for the film came about in early 2019, during research work on the topic resulting from his own interest. He describes the year as a peak of young political activism, in which, looking back, he expresses an interest that was already high at the time: »Die jungen Menschen arbeiten gegen deutlich mächtigere Kontrahenten und haben weniger Ressourcen zur Verfügung. Darüber wollte ich unbedingt mehr lernen und erfahren [...]« (English: „Young people are working against much more powerful opponents and have fewer resources at their disposal. I really wanted to learn and experience more about that“).

Dear Future Children is the feature film debut of director Franz Böhm. The project was mainly financed through a crowdfunding campaign. The film received further financial support through a post-production grant and a distribution grant from the Medien- und Filmgesellschaft Baden-Württemberg (MFG).

Originally the film project was known under the working title Prayers Do Nothing.

== Development ==
Dear Future Children was made over the course of two years and was completed in January 2021. The production of the film involved filmmakers, as well as journalists, activists and other contributors from over 15 different countries. With an average age of only 21, the team is also considered exceptionally young.

Extensive measures were taken to prepare for the shooting, including safety briefings, special training sessions and consultations with filmmakers at the respective destinations.

== Filming ==
The film team was led by director Franz Böhm and DOP Friedemann Leis, who travelled to the locations exclusively as a team of two. At the destinations in Hong Kong, Uganda, Chile and Denmark, young local filmmakers were involved to provide significant support. In addition, cooperation with various local and international NGOs, institutions and media was formed in all countries. These include Amnesty International, the Goethe Institute, Galeria Cima in Chile, The Guardian and The New York Times.

Some filming on the frontline of the demonstrations was done strictly in teams of two for security reasons. Böhm and Leis consulted with local supporters via radio.

On 30 January 2020, while filming in Chile, a policeman shot director Franz Böhm at close range, hitting him in the back of the head with a rubber bullet. However, due to appropriate safety clothing (protective clothing, gas mask, helmet) Böhm did not suffer any serious injury.

At the end of June 2020, Franz Böhm travelled to Hong Kong a second time to talk to Pepper about new developments and the situation during the National Security Law.

== Challenges ==
Besides the physically risky filming on location, the time afterwards was explicitly marked by challenges regarding the safety of the team. Significant here was the pressure from the Chinese region. This included a large number of concrete death threats and calls for bounties on the head of director Franz Böhm. Digital accounts and bank accounts of team members were also increasingly the target of attempted hacking attacks.

By working together with students from the Universities of Harvard and Stanford, the team was able to successfully contain these dangers, track attacks, counter them legally and secure data and communication channels. This cooperation and newly developed technologies were also used to securely export the film footage from Hong Kong in order to protect the identities of all recognisable participants.

At a film discussion at the Frontline Club in London on 1 December 2021, director Böhm announced that this approach will be further expanded to create an infrastructure that will also be available to support other projects.

== Key Elements ==
Dear Future Children highlights the motivations of young people who face exceptional challenges and sometimes life-threatening risks by participating in movements and demonstrations. The film does not make use of expert interviews and instead lets the protagonists and other directly affected personalities speak. However, international reactions on the developments within the respective countries and crisis situations are included. In addition, contributions from various media outlets are included to complement the recorded footage.

The plot of the film is divided into three thematic parts of global-political dimensions and narrates them in the form of a parallel montage.

The overarching core themes of Dear Future Children are social and human fates and related general themes such as social inequality, political oppression, police violence, climate catastrophes and displacement. The film refers to social, health, material and existential dangers and risks for the activists in the film as well as for the greater society.

The three different movements are united by, among other things, the emphasis on the crisis situations and underlying issues as intergenerational and international, as well as the young age of the activists.

== Release ==
Dear Future Children had theatrical releases in the following countries:

- Germany (Distribution: Camino Filmverleih)
- Canada (Distribution: Photon Films)
- United Kingdom (Distribution: Dartmouth Films)
- Switzerland (Distribution: SpotOn)

In an interview with Forbes DACH, producer Johannes Schubert also announced an Austrian theatrical release for 2022.

In Germany, the distribution was supported by MFG Baden-Württemberg with 30,000 euros. Distributors in Canada, the UK, Switzerland and Austria were independently supported by German Films with funding amounts of 4,000 to 6,000 euros.

In France, the streaming service BrutX presented Dear Future Children as part of a new film line-up.

World sales were handled by the Berlin-based company Magnetfilm.

On 23 November 2021, Dear Future Children was screened simultaneously in 89 different ODEON cinemas in the UK as part of a nationwide event. The screening was followed by an interview with Hong Kong activist and protagonist Pepper.

Producer Johannes Schubert cites the so-called "Field Organiser System" as a special reason for the film's success, whereby activists and other interested parties can get involved in promoting the film. They get in touch with NGOs, schools or youth organisations in their regions and thus create a network to show the film to a larger number of people.

Since October 2022 the film can be viewed on the streaming service Netflix.

== Reception ==
The Encyclopaedia of International Film judged: »Jenseits von Sensationshascherei und Agitation finden die aufwühlenden Porträts eine authentische Ebene, die das Engagement der drei Frauen begreiflich macht, ohne sie zu heroisieren« (English: „Beyond sensationalism and agitation, the stirring portraits find an authentic level that makes the commitment of the three women comprehensible without heroising them.“).

Phuong Le (The Guardian) reviews Dear Future Children as »[...] an impressive debut from such a young director, who is clearly marching in step with his progressive peers.«

Katja Sebald (Süddeutsche Zeitung) adds that one can only agree with Böhm's effort to show Dear Future Children to the largest possible audience: »Politiker und Wähler, Lehrer und Schüler, Eltern und Kinder, überhaupt jeder sollte diese aufrüttelnde Dokumentation sehen« (English: „Politicians and voters, teachers and students, parents and children, in fact everyone should see this stirring documentary“).

As part of the Hot Docs Film Festival, Angie Driscoll describes Dear Future Children as a »[...] refreshing film focused on female activists that removes the machismo and grandstanding standard for protest documentaries.« Pat Mullen (POV Magazine) adds: »Dear Future Children challenges audiences to remain hopeful for their sake. These stories should encourage young audiences to keep up the good fight.«

Frieda Lurken (Keppel Health Review) explains Dear Future Children as »[...] refreshingly sober in its depiction of the stark realities facing young activists. Although it celebrates its protagonists, it doesn’t glorify or stylise them but presents them as the brave and vulnerable humans they are.«

Jan Kinzl (Modern Times Review) praises Dear Future Children during the CPH:DOX film festival as »[...] the most powerful film in the entire section. [...] Director Franz Böhm brilliantly maintains a balance between all three stories, which allows him to develop a complex picture of several of today’s socio-environmental issues within the scope of a single film.«

The film was also well received within the countries and movements represented and received support among others from Fridays For Future and Stand With Hong Kong. A tweet showing the trailer for Dear Future Children on Stand With Hong Kong's official Twitter account was viewed over 20,000 times and shared over 1,000 times within 24 hours. Among others, by Hong Kong singer, actress and activist Denise Ho.

== Accolades ==
Dear Future Children received the Audience Award at the 2021 Hot Docs Documentary Festival, the 19th International Film Festival and Forum on Human Rights (FIFDH) and the 42nd Max Ophüls Prize Film Festival. Due to its win at Hot Docs, the film now automatically qualifies for 2022 Academy Awards. The film was also shown out of competition at the Copenhagen International Documentary Film Festival (CPH:DOX).

The Deutsche Film- und Medienbewertung (FBW) in Wiesbaden awarded the film the rating "besonders wertvoll".

At the 2021 Cinéfest Sudbury International Film Festival, it was cowinner, alongside Elle-Máijá Tailfeathers's film Kímmapiiyipitssini: The Meaning of Empathy, of the Inspiring Voices and Perspectives award.

Dear Future Children was awarded the 2022 German Documentary Film Award in the category Best Documentary Film as well as the Audience Award.
