= Johannes Schubert =

Austrian film producer (born 1990)

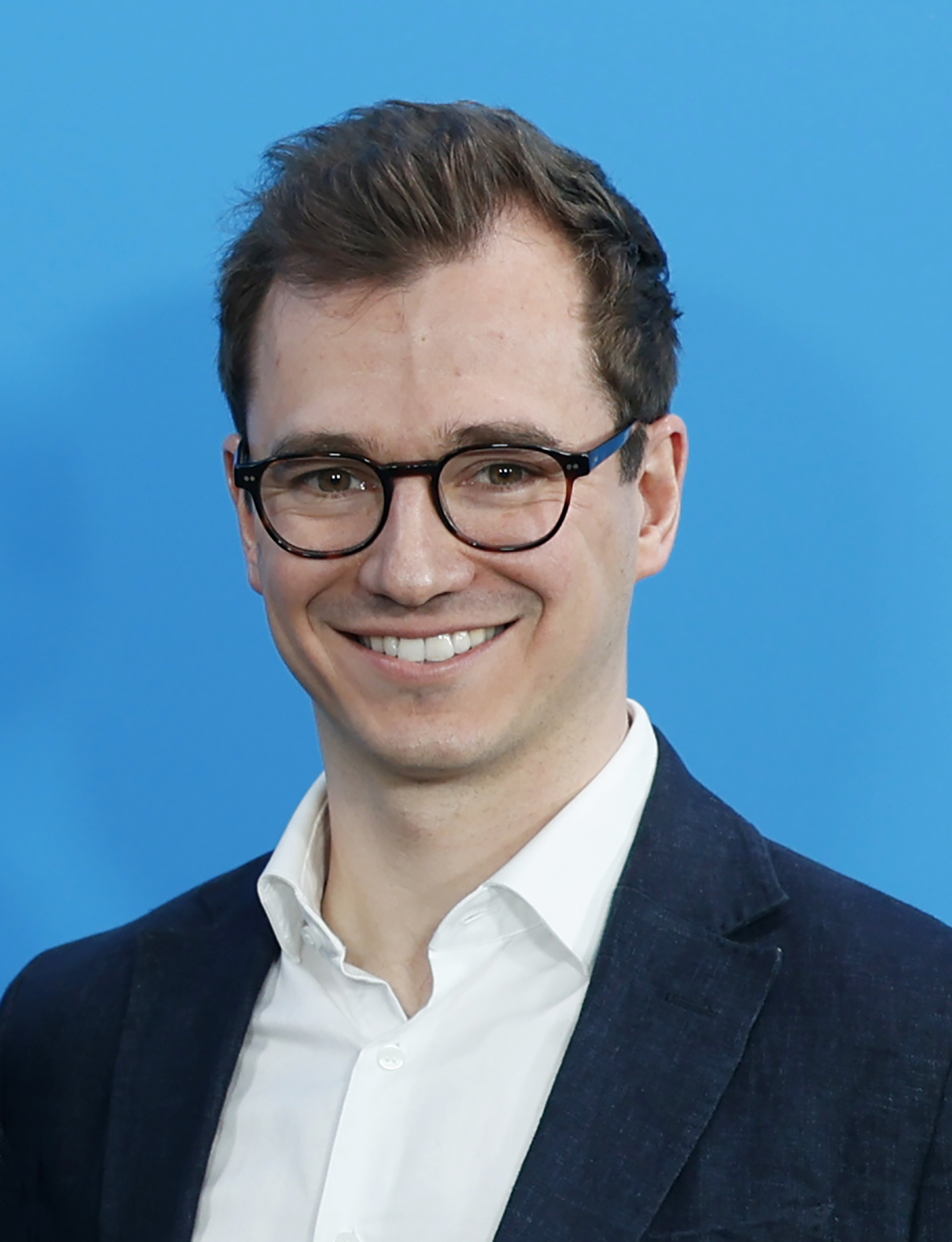
Schubert in 2026

Johannes Schubert is an Austrian film producer.

== Biography ==
Schubert studied for a bachelor's degree in Film and Television Production at the Film University Babelsberg Konrad Wolf in Potsdam, Germany, from 2014 to 2018. Between 2019 and 2021, he completed a master's degree in Producing at the National Film and Television School in Beaconsfield, England.

== Selected filmography ==
- 2017: Kontener
- 2018: Germania
- 2018: Mascarpone
- 2018: Una Primavera
- 2021: Dear Future Children
- 2021: The Clearing
- 2022: Laika & Nemo
- 2023: Club Zero
- 2026: Rose
