= Franz Böhm (director) =

German film director

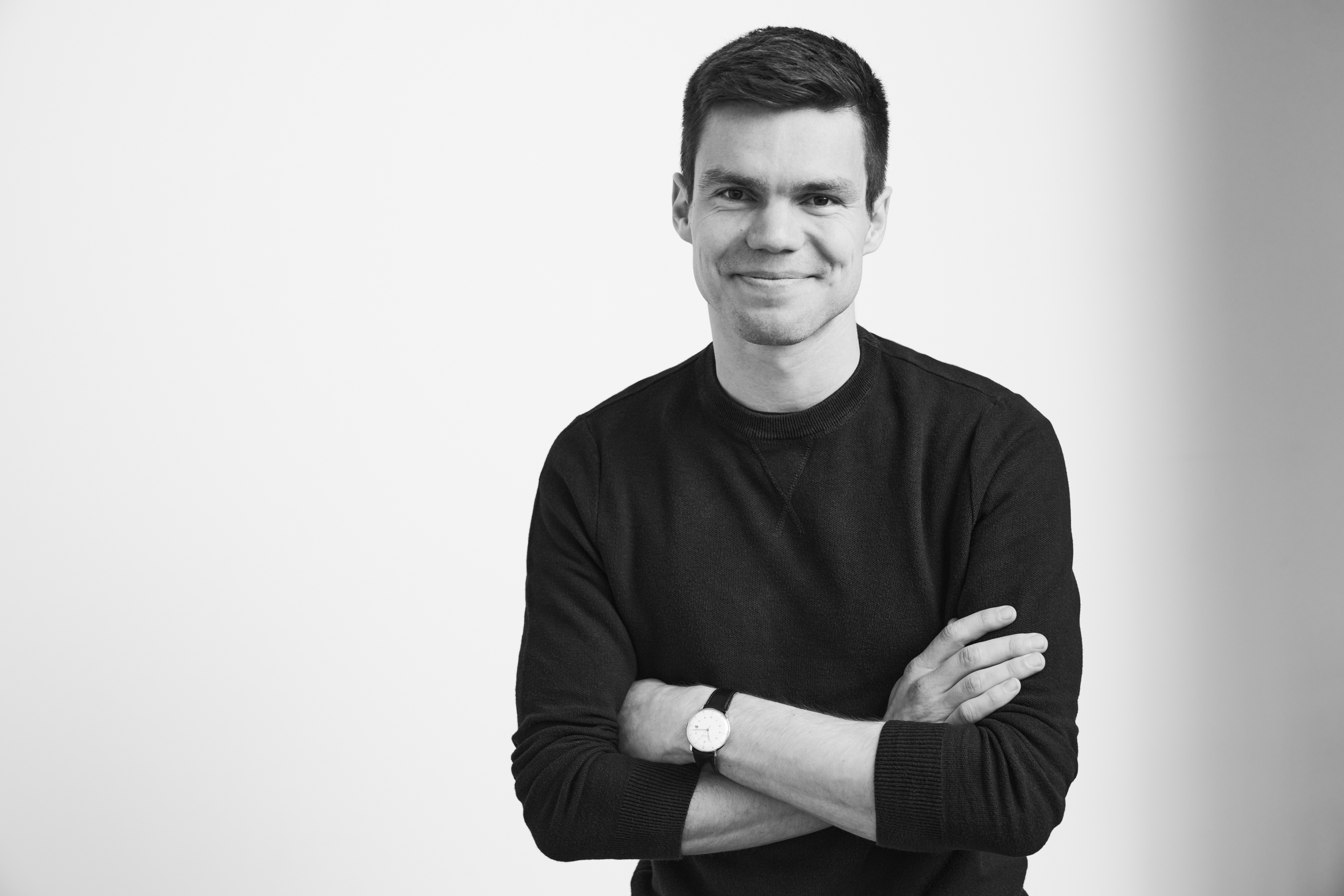
- Born: 1999 (age 26–27); Stuttgart, Germany
- Education: National Film and Television School
- Notable work: Dear Future Children Rock, Paper, Scissors
- Awards: BAFTA Award for Best British Short Film; German Documentary Film Award; Hot Docs Audience Award
- Website: www.franzboehm.com

Franz Böhm (born in 1999) is a BAFTA-winning British-German film director and producer.

== Biography ==
Böhm was born in 1999 in Stuttgart, Germany. His grandmother fled from East Germany to escape communism. When he was eleven years old, his father died in a motorcycle accident. Böhm started working on numerous films and commercials as a runner or production assistant. At the age of 16, he directed his first short film, Harmony of Others, which explores the interactions of young people from different social backgrounds. This was followed in 2017 by the medium-length, fictionalized documentary Christmas Wishes, which tells the stories of two homeless individuals in Berlin. For the film, Böhm spent a week living with homeless people. The project opened the 2017 BW Youth Film Award and won awards at various film festivals.

Böhm made his international debut in 2019 with the short film Good Luck. The film premiered at the British Independent Film Festival 2019, where it won the award for “Best Cinematography”. He made his feature film debut in 2021 with the documentary Dear Future Children. The film focuses on the subject of young, international activism through the experiences of three activists from Hong Kong, Uganda, and Chile. The project was funded via a campaign on Kickstarter.com, which raised €22,039 from 391 backers. The film won the Audience Award at its world premiere at the Max Ophüls Prize Film Festival and at its subsequent Swiss premiere at the International Film Festival and Forum on Human Rights, setting multiple records in the process. The 89 minute film was also nominated at several of the world's largest international documentary film festivals, including CPH:DOX. At Hot Docs International Film Festival, the film won the audience award.

In 2022, Böhm became the youngest director to win both the Audience Award and the Grand Prize at the German Documentary Film Award.

Böhm completed his master's degree in directing at the National Film and Television School in Beaconsfield, England. His graduation film Rock, Paper, Scissors won in the Best British Short Film category at the 2025 BAFTA Awards, making him the youngest BAFTA winner that year. The film is based on the true story of a young Ukrainian soldier who Böhm met in the UK. The film stars the Ukrainian actor Oleksandr Rudynskyi. A British production, Rock, Paper, Scissors premiered at the Show Me Shorts Film Festival in New Zealand on 13th October 2024, an Academy Award-qualifying festival. It later screened at several prestigious international festivals, including the British Urban Film Festival, Aesthetica Film Festival, Cambridge Film Festival, and Norwich Film Festival in the UK. It also screened at the St. Louis International Film Festival in the United States, where it was nominated for the Audience Award for Best Live Action Short Film, another Oscar-qualifying category. In 2025, it won the CILECT Prize for Best Fiction Film, awarded by the association of the world’s leading film schools. The film was later shortlisted for the Academy Award for Best Live Action Short Film at the 98th Academy Awards.

His upcoming untitled feature film, an international co-production starring Zar Amir, Jonathan Pryce and Amir El-Masry, was supported by various European film funding institutions. The film was shot in Germany and the US and wrapped production in December 2025. It is currently in post-production. On 27 January 2026 Variety, Deadline and ScreenDaily announced that Beta Cinema will handle worldwide sales.

== Filmography (selection) ==
- 2016: Harmonie der Anderen (short film)
- 2018: Christmas Wishes
- 2019: Good Luck (short film)
- 2021: Dear Future Children
- 2024: Rock, Paper, Scissors (short film)

== Official Website ==
franzboehm.com

== Awards and nominations ==
Year	Award	Category	Work	Result	Ref.
2021	Max Ophüls Preis	Audience Award – Documentary	Dear Future Children	Won	
2021	Max Ophüls Preis	Best Documentary Film	Dear Future Children	Nominated	
2021	International Film Festival and Forum on Human Rights	International Competition	Dear Future Children	Nominated	
2021	Hot Docs	Audience Award	Dear Future Children	Won	
2022	German Documentary Film Award	Main Prize (shared with Mr. Bachmann and His Class)	Dear Future Children	Won	
2022	German Documentary Film Award	Audience Award (SWR Landesschau)	Dear Future Children	Won	
2024	Show Me Shorts Film Festival	Best International Film	Rock, Paper, Scissors	Nominated	
2024	St. Louis International Film Festival	Best Live Action Short	Rock, Paper, Scissors	Nominated	
2025	Max Ophüls Preis	Best Short Film	Rock, Paper, Scissors	Nominated	
2025	British Academy Film Awards	Best British Short Film	Rock, Paper, Scissors	Won	
2025	British Short Film Awards	Best Foreign Language Short Film	Rock, Paper, Scissors	Nominated	
2025	Sony Future Filmmaker Awards	Student	Rock, Paper, Scissors	Won	
2025	CILECT Prize	Fiction	Rock, Paper, Scissors	Won	
2025	HollyShorts London	Grand Prize – Best Short Film	Rock, Paper, Scissors	Won	
2025	HollyShorts London	Best Student Film	Rock, Paper, Scissors	Won	
