= Double Life (Pharrell Williams song) =

2024 song by Pharrell Williams

Single by Pharrell Williams
- Written: May 2024
- Released: June 14, 2024
- Length: 3:10
- Label: Back Lot; Columbia; I Am Other
- Songwriter: Pharrell Williams
- Producer: Pharrell Williams

Lyric video
- "Double Life" on YouTube

"Double Life" is a song written, produced, and performed by American musician Pharrell Williams. Originally previewed on Williams' YouTube channel on May 8, the song was released by Columbia Records as a single for the soundtrack of the animated film Despicable Me 4 on June 14, 2024.

== Release ==
On May 8, 2024, Williams previewed a 30-second snippet of the song's bridge on his YouTube channel. On June 14, 2024, Williams officially released the full song as a single ahead of its appearance in the film Despicable Me 4.

== Composition ==
Sheet music for "Double Life" shows the key of G♯ minor with a tempo of 120 beats per minute in common time.

== Critical reception ==
Writing for Uproxx, Derrick Rossignol observed that "the tune isn't as general and movie-agnostic as something like 'Happy'". He praised the song's groove and especially its refrain about Gru, calling it "actually catchy as hell". He concluded, "This probably won’t be a world-changing single like "Happy", but it’s in the upper tier of kids movie soundtrack fare". Michael Saponara said in Billboard, "it's easy to imagine "Double Life" and the catchy chorus cooked up by Pharrell finding its way into Gru’s adventures".

Writing for Rolling Stone, Larisha Paul noted the prominent bassline in the song, and assessed that it has "a bit of a menacing and existential edge". Tom Breihan writes for Stereogum, "[The song] isn’t about being happy, which means it’s probably not going to be another "Happy". Instead, it's about keeping secrets, which is just as universal but which makes it less appropriate for heavy birthday-party rotation. It seems fine? I don’t know." He mentioned Williams's previous music for the franchise, bemoaning the potential for the song to see popularity among the film's younger audience.

Many critics and listeners interpreted the song as a diss track. HotNewHipHop's Danilo Castro pointed out Williams's friendship with Drake's rival Pusha T, and singling out the bars "Lie detector time", "Hey, what are you hiding?", and "Nothin' wrong bein' private... Make sure it ain't wrong" as being a direct retaliation against the Canadian rapper. Castro furthermore commented it was "wild" having a diss track appear in the soundtrack for a children's movie. Ahmad Davis of Rap-Up observed the same possible intent, noting the history between the two. Davis highlighted Drake's purchase of several of Williams's jewelry items and gold PlayStation Portable at an estate sale, and his subsequent mention of the purchases in his 2024 diss track "Family Matters", similarly noting the lyrical content as an indirect jab as a response to earlier remarks by the rapper. Complex's Jaelani Turner-Williams recalled the two's past disagreements, calling back to Drake's initial provocations towards Williams on Travis Scott's "Meltdown" in 2023, and how Williams had as-of-yet not directly addressed their conflict. He pointed out that noted rival Kendrick Lamar has appeared in Williams's Lego biopic film Piece by Piece (2024).

== Credits and personnel ==
Adapted from YouTube.

Technical personnel

- Pharrell Williams – production
- Bryce Bordone – engineer
- Randy Merrill – mastering engineer
- Serban Ghenea – mixing engineer
- Mike Larson – recording engineer
- Alan Meyerson – recording engineer
- Ali Khazaee - cover art

== Charts ==
Chart performance for "Double Life"
Chart (2024)	Peak position
Australia Hip Hop/R&B (ARIA)	23
Canada Hot 100 (Billboard)	68
Global 200 (Billboard)	190
Ireland (IRMA)	52
New Zealand Hot Singles (RMNZ)	27
UK Singles (Official Charts)	56
US Billboard Hot 100	89
