= Ka Whawhai Tonu =

New Zealand historical drama film by Michael Jonathan

- Directed by: Michael Jonathan
- Screenplay by: Tim Worrall
- Produced by: Piripi Curtis; Toby Parkinson
- Starring: Cliff Curtis; Temuera Morrison; Miriama Smith; Paku Fernandez; Hinerangi Harawira-Nicholas; Jason Flemyng
- Cinematography: Grant McKinnnon
- Edited by: Te Rurehe Paki & Martin Brinkler
- Music by: Arli Liberman & Tiki Taane
- Production company: Aheake
- Distributed by: Transmission Films
- Release date: 27 June 2024 (New Zealand)
- Running time: 114 minutes
- Country: New Zealand
- Languages: Māori; English
- Box office: $598,476

Ka Whawhai Tonu - Struggle Without End is a 2024 New Zealand historical drama film directed by Michael Jonathan, based on a screenplay by Tim Worrall. Presented in the Māori language, it tells the story of the siege of Ōrākau in 1864 during the New Zealand Wars from the perspective of two Māori teenagers. The movie stars Temuera Morrison, Cliff Curtis, Miriama Smith, Paku Fernandez and Hinerangi Harawira-Nicholas. Ka Whawhai Tonu premiered in Hamilton on 17 June 2024 before being released in cinemas nationwide on 27 June.

== Plot summary ==
During the New Zealand Wars in 1864, the teenage Haki is a mixed Māori-European boy captured by Tūhoe forces led by Rewi Maniapoto, Te Whenuanui and Hine-i-tūrama in their fight against New Zealand colonial forces.

Haki becomes acquainted with the teenage girl Kōpū, who is believed by her tribe to serve as a medium for the Māori god of war. Rewi's men establish a trench-like Pā around Ōrākau, which is under siege.

Haki strikes up a reluctant friendship with Kōpū. When some members of the tribe suspect her of being a witch and attempt to kill her, Haki saves her life by shooting the killer. After the defenders reject an offer to surrender, the colonial forces storm the pā, slaughtering both combatants and civilians.

Haki and Kōpu escape with several children, including a young boy who is mortally wounded by a bullet. We learn that Haki is the son of Daniel Morgan, a British officer who blames the Māori for the death of Haki's mother, his wife, and vowed revenge on the Māori tribes resisting British authority.

Haki uses his identity to return to the British encampment to steal a horse and supplies, and returns to the children as they seek refuge from the war. Morgan catches up with them but is rescued by Te Whenuanui, who fights Morgan and kills him following an epic duel. Based on a song his mother passed down to him, the other children help Haki find his ancestral homeland of Mangarou, where he is tearfully embraced by his maternal grandmother.

== Cast ==
Cast members included new leads Paku Fernandez as Haki and Hinerangi Harawira-Nicholas as Kopu, alongside Temuera Morrison, Cliff Curtis, Miriama Smith, and Jason Flemyng as Daniel Morgan.

- Paku Fernandez as Haki
- Hinerangi Harawira-Nicholas as Kopu
- Naatana Mika as Puku
- Temuera Morrison as Rewi Maniapoto
- Cliff Curtis as Wi Toka
- Miriama Smith as Turama
- Jason Flemyng as Daniel Morgan
- Te Wakaunua Te Kurapa as Te Whenuanui

== Production ==
=== Writing and development ===
Ka Whawhai Tonu's screenplay was written by Tim Worrall with the assistance of the Sundance Native Lab. While the story of Haki and Kōpū is fictional, the film drew upon historical real accounts of the Battle of Ōrākau and featured several historical characters including Tūhoe chief Te Whenuanui and Hine-i-tūrama Ngātiki. Out of respect for the source material and to facilitate worldbuilding, 95% of the film's dialogue is in the Māori language.

=== Filming ===
Ka Whawhai Tonu was the directorial debut of Mike Jonathan and produced by Piripi Curtis and Thomas Toby Parkinson. The film was produced by Aheake. Grant McKinnon served as director of photography while Shayne Radford served as production designer. Te Ura Hoskins served as wardrobe designer while Sara Fitzell served as makeup artist and hair stylist. Moko (Māori tattoos) artist Jacob Tautari designed the moko that appeared in the film.

It had a budget of NZ$7.6 million, with NZ$2.5 million coming from the New Zealand Film Commission's Te Rautaki Māori fund and a 40 percent Screen Production Rebate In addition, the film received funding from Te Mangai Paho (the Māori Broadcast Funding Agency), NZ on Air, and Te Puni Kōkiri's (the Ministry for Māori Development) Te Pūtake o te Riri (Wars and Conflicts in New Zealand) Fund, which raises awareness about the New Zealand Wars. Piripi Curtis also unsuccessfully applied for funding from the Bank of New Zealand. According to Curtis, the film took eight years to complete.

== Marketing ==
A promotional still of Ka Whawhai Tonu was released at the Cannes Film Festival in mid May 2023.

On 2 April 2024, a trailer was released to mark the 160th anniversary of the Battle of O-Rākau.

== Release ==
The film was released on 27 June 2024 during the Matariki weekend to coincide with the 160-year anniversary of Ngāti Maniapoto chief Rewi Maniapoto's battle cry, E hoa, ka whawhai tonu mātou, Āke! Āke! Āke! (Friend, we will fight on forever, forever and forever!). The film was distributed in Australia and New Zealand by Transmission Films with the London-based Locomotive Entertainment serving as its sales agent.

== Reception ==
Graemet Tuckett of Stuff gave the film a positive review, awarding it four stars. He wrote: "Ka Whawhai Tonu is a mostly terrific piece of work. It is tender when it needs to be, raucously funny at times and pounds across the screen like a classic war movie in between."

Emma Gleason of The New Zealand Herald gave the film a positive review, describing it as "a bloody, brilliant coming-of-age film stacked with powerful performances." She praised the film for grappling with the legacy of colonialism in New Zealand and honouring the Treaty of Waitangi. Gleason also praised the creative decision to have 95% of the film's dialogue in the Māori language, which she described as critical to world-building, respectful for the source material, and immersive. Gleason also compared the film to similar Māori-themed historical films such as Utu and Lee Tamahori's The Convert.

Kate Rodger of Newshub gave the film 4.5 stars, describing it as "a powerful story of Aotearoa's history through a Māori lens." She praised the performance of Temuerra Morrison and the creative decision to tell the Battle of O Rākau through the eyes of two teenage characters.

== Awards and nominations ==
Year	Association	Category	Result	Ref.
2025	Septimius Awards	Best Ocenia Film	Won	
2025	New Zealand Screen Awards	Best Film	Won	
