= Te Whenuanui =

New Zealand Māori chief

Te Whenuanui (c. 1815 – 1907), also known as Te Haka, was a notable New Zealand Tūhoe chief, builder and carver. He was born in Maungapohatu, Bay of Plenty, New Zealand. As a carver, some of Te Whenuanui's work included the house Te Whai-a-te-motu at Ruatāhuna, made to symbolise the hardships Tūhoe had faced during the New Zealand Wars.
