= Richard Lynch (musician) =

American singer-songwriter

- Born: December 5, 1962 (age 63); Lebanon, Ohio, U.S.
- Genres: Country, outlaw country, Western swing, honky-tonk
- Occupations: Singer, songwriter
- Instruments: Vocals, guitar
- Years active: 1978–present

Richard Lynch (born December 5, 1962, in Lebanon, Ohio) is an American country music singer/songwriter with a successful career that has lasted over three decades. Lynch’s highest-charting single “A Better Place” topped the New Music Weekly AM/FM country chart, the IndieWorld Country Record Report and spent 32 weeks on top of the Roots Music Report True Country chart. Lynch is a member of the Independent Country Music Hall of Fame.

== Life and career ==
Lynch was born in Lebanon, Ohio, and raised on a 110-acre farm that his family operated. From his father Woody Lynch, an established local musician, Richard inherited the love for country music and lifestyle. At the age of 13 Richard picked up the guitar and learned to play. By the age of 15 he got his first gig at a wedding reception. At the age of 18 he organized his own band (the Renegade Band later renamed the Richard Lynch Band) and has been successfully recording and touring ever since.

Lynch refers to his music as "pure country, showcasing elements of western swing, honky tonk and outlaw country". His style is influenced by classic American country artists like Keith Whitley, Conway Twitty and George Strait.

In January 2017 Lynch collaborated with Ronnie McDowell on a military tribute duet "Love Tattoo".

On April 1, 2017, Lynch's third studio album "Mending Fences" was released via an independent record label, Fence Row Records The album features a duet with a bluegrass singer Rhonda Vincent.

Lynch co-hosts “Traditionally Lynch” show on Renegade Radio Nashville.

Lynch is also an accomplished designer and builder of barns. He resides in Waynesville, Ohio, with his wife Donna.

== Discography ==
=== Albums ===
Title	Album details
The Last of a Dying Breed	Release date: 2013; Label: Fence Row Records
A Better Place	Release date: 2015; Label: MOD Records
Mending Fences	Release date: 2017; Label: Fence Row Records
Think I'll Carry It On	Release date: 2019; Label: Fence Row Records
My Guitar Drips Country	Release date: 2021; Label: MTS Records
Radio Friend	Release date: 2023; Label: MTS Records
Pulling Up the Covers	Release date: 2024; Label: MTS Records
Some Days Are Better Than Others	Release date: 2024; Label: MTS Records

== Achievements and awards ==
- January 1, 2019, Lynch was inducted into the Ohio Country Music Hall of Fame
- Lynch was nominated as Best Male Country Artist by the Independent Country Music Association (2014)
- Album "A Better Place" was named the Pure Country Album of the Year by the Academy of Western Artists (2015)
- The Richard Lynch Band was named the Traditional Country Band of the Year by the Josie Music Awards (2015)
- As a founder of Love Tattoo Foundation, Lynch was named the Humanitarian of the Year by the Josie Music Awards (2015)
- The Richard Lynch Band was named the Traditional Country Band of the Year by the Josie Music Awards (2015)
- Single "She's Got Me Drinkin' Again" was named the Song of the Year by CMG Global Radio (2015)
- Single "A Better Place" was named No. 1 True Country Song by Roots Music Report (2016)
- Single "She's Got Me Drinkin' Again" (a duet with Billy Yates) was nominated as Best “New Group/Duo” for the New Music Awards (2016)
- 2017 Richard Lynch receives seven nominations for the Annual Josie Music Awards. Traditional Male Country Artist, Traditional Country Male Vocalist, Video of The Year "We're American Proud, Traditional Country Song of The Year "Cut & Paste", Traditional Country Album of The Year "Mending Fences", Salute to America Song of The Year "We're American Proud", Traditional Country Entertainer of The Year. http://www.josiemusicawards.com/
