= Oleksandr Rudynskyi =

Ukrainian actor

- Олександр Рудинський
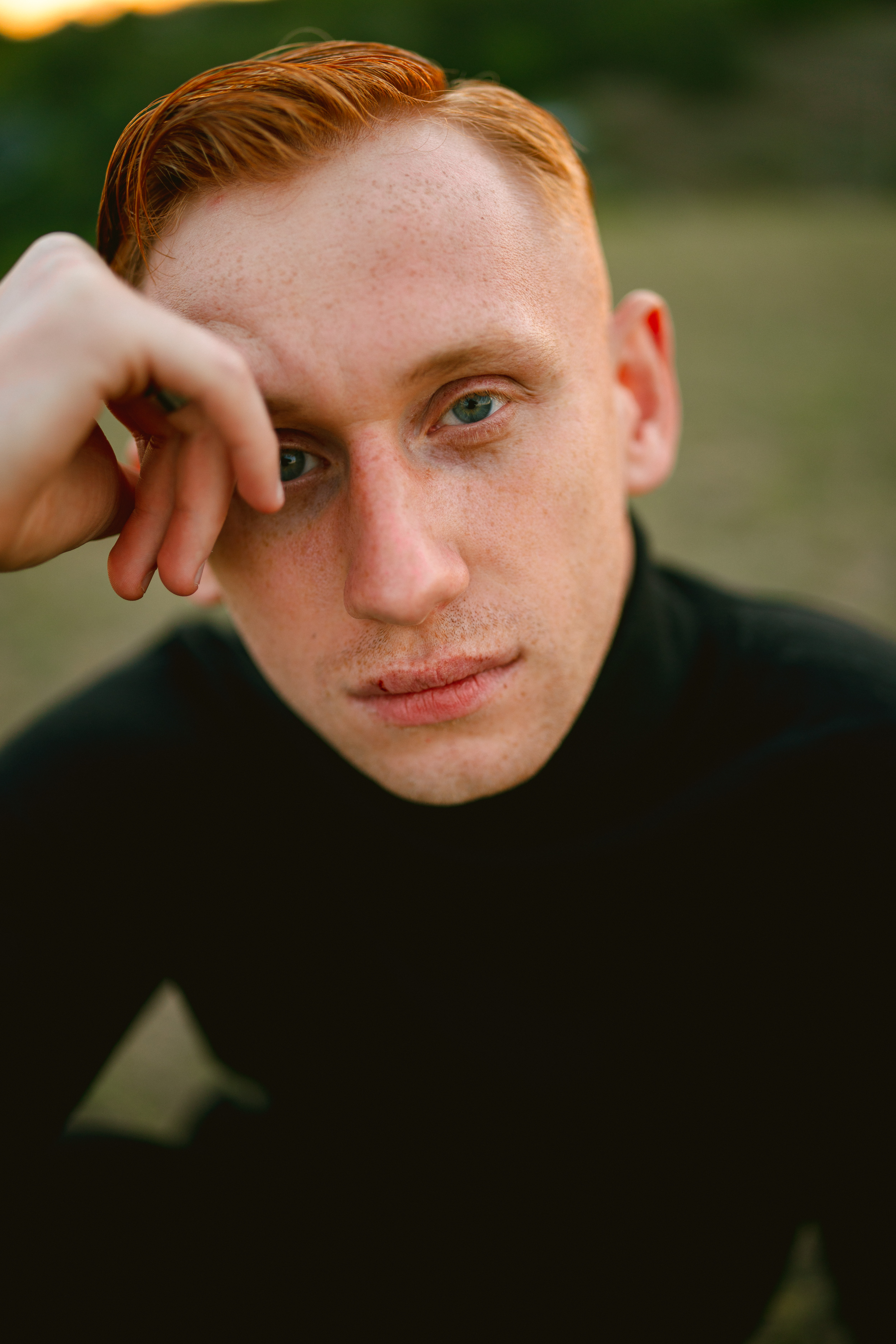
- Rudynskyi in 2024
- Born: 23 July 1996 (age 30); Mykolaiv, Mykolaiv Oblast, Ukraine
- Occupation: Actor
- Years active: 2015–present
- Title: Merited Artist of Ukraine (2025)
- Spouse: Mariia Rudynska

Oleksandr Serhiyovych Rudynskyi (Ukrainian: Олександр Сергійович Рудинський; born 23 July 1996), also known as Sasha Rudynskyi, is a Ukrainian stage, television and film actor. In 2025, he received the title of Merited Artist of Ukraine.

Rudynskyi attended the Kyiv National I. K. Karpenko-Kary Theatre, Cinema and Television University from 2014 to 2018. After graduating, he performed as Sir Toby Belch in a production of Shakespeare's Twelfth Night at the Theatre on the Left bank of the Dnieper. In recent years Rudynskyi has performed in roles for both film and television, including the title role in the Canadian short film Goodbye Golovin, which later won Best Short Film at the Odesa International Film Festival in 2020, the Netflix series The Decameron, a recurring role in the 2024 Paramount+ with Showtime series The Agency starring Michael Fassbender and the lead role in BAFTA award winning short film Rock, Paper, Scissors.

== Filmography ==
=== Film ===
Film and Television appearances correct as of November 2024

Year	Title	Role	Notes
2015	It Was Showering in Manchester		Short
2018	Posttravmatichna rapsodiya		
2018	Shlyakhetni volotsyuhi	Drozdov	
2018	11 ditey z Morshyna	Hutsul	
2019	Beasts		Short
2019	Goodbye Golovin	Ian Golovin	Winner of Best Short Film at the Odesa International Film Festival
2019	Nightmare Director, or School #5	Psykh	
2021	Sad Portraits		
2021	Viryty	Prisoner	
2021	Rhino	Rudyi	
2021	Amber Cops	Yurko	
2022	The Best Weekend	Sanya	
2023	Stay Online		
2024	Dwie siostry	Sasha	
2024	Rock, Paper, Scissors	Ivan	Won BAFTA for Best British Short Film
2024	Malevych		
2024	Zbory OSBB	Anton	
TBA	Gundam	TBA	Filming

=== Television ===
Year	Title	Role	Notes
2017	Wataha		3 episodes
2018	Za zakonamy voyennoho chasu 2	Dezhurnyy v prokurature	8 episodes
2019	Love in Chains	molodoy Stepan	4 episodes
2019-2020	Early Swallows	Nick Maslov (season 1), Liosha Smetanin (season 2)	16 episodes
2019-2021	Roztyn pokazhe		2 episodes
2021	Slovania	Zubaty	12 episodes
2022-2023	Django	Spencer Forrest	9 episodes
2023	Those Who Stayed	Maks	1 episode
2023	Holova	Sanyok	13 episodes
2024	The Decameron	Eyeless Bandit	2 episodes
2024	The Agency	Sasha Boutenko	4 episodes
2025	Sim'ya po nedilyah		
2025	Khovaiuchy kolyshniu		
2026	Povernennia †		
2026	Tykha Nava †		Post production
TBA	History in Stories. What if? †	Narrator	TV Mini Series

== Personal life ==
Rudynskyi lives with his wife, actress Mariia Rudynska, and their son in Ukraine.
