= Arli Liberman =

Israeli composer, musician, and producer (born 1986)

Arli Liberman ארלי ליברמן
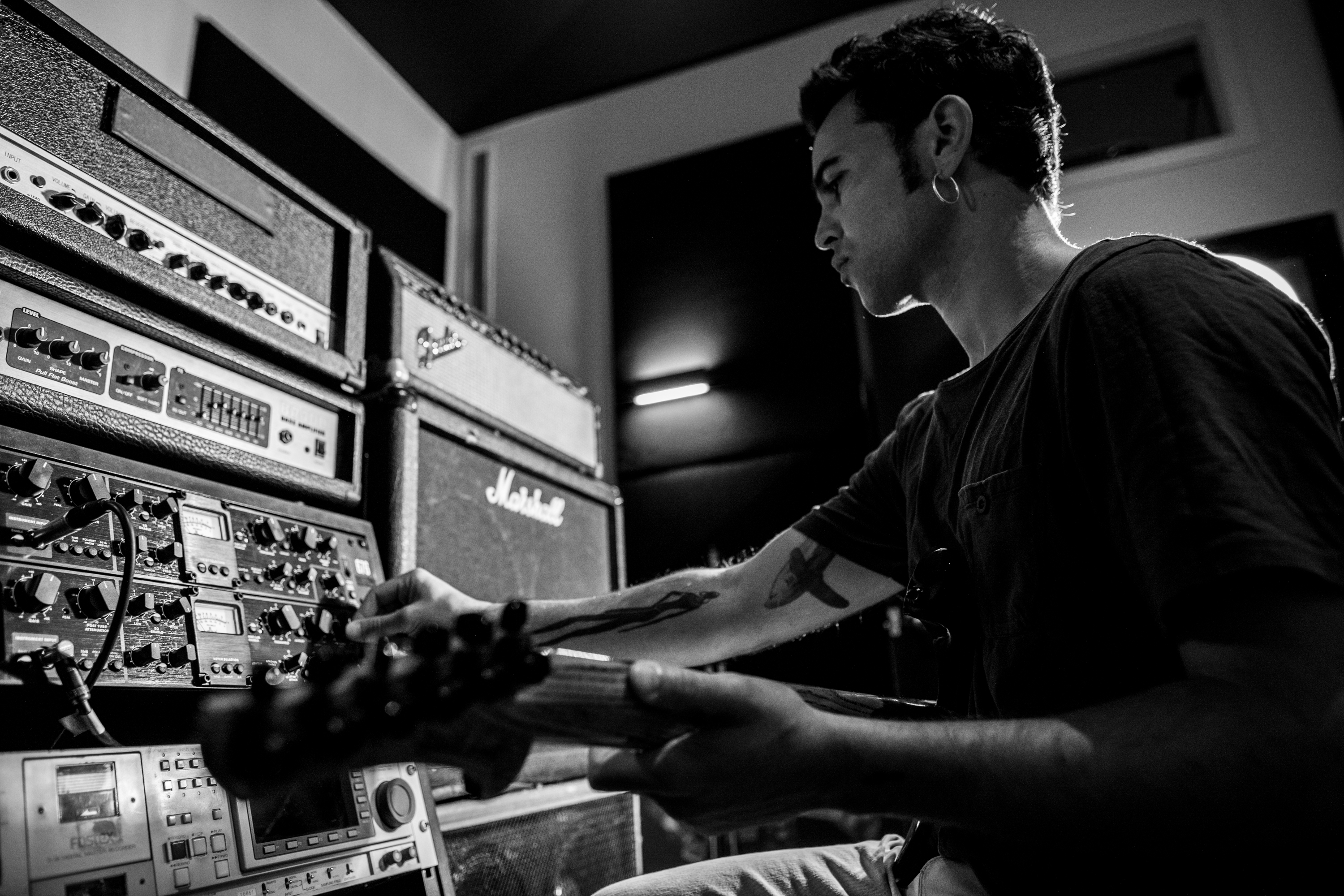

Background information
- Born: December 17, 1986 (age 39)
- Origin: Israel
- Genres: Ambient; film score; world; instrumental rock; progressive rock; Middle Eastern
- Occupations: Composer; musician; producer
- Instruments: Guitar; bass; keyboards; drums; percussion; bağlama
- Years active: 2002–present
- Member of: Zaviot
- Formerly of: Whiteflag Project
- Website: arlimusic.com

Arli Liberman (Hebrew: ארלי ליברמן; born 1986) is an Israeli-born New Zealand composer, guitarist and music producer. He plays in many genres and is especially known for his vibrant, immersive live performances and musical experiences for feature and television scores. His production process is uninhibited and collaborative, often working with directors during script development through to the early stages of post-production prior to final score itself.

== Career ==
Arli began guitar at 13 years old and at 16 began working as a session guitarist with a variety of recording artists in Israel at which time he was discovered and then mentored by gold and platinum selling English record producer and bassist Mark Smulian.

From the 2005 to 2009 Arli was a key member of the Whiteflag Project – one of the Middle East's first world fusion cross-over bands made up of Palestinian and Israeli musicians. At this time he began his journey into ambient, textural manipulation of his music through his unique analogue sound rig. Arli also co-produced, edited and played on Whiteflag Project's album Talk released by Phonag Records in 2005.

In 2009 Arli moved permanently to New Zealand, working initially as a guitarist and producer, releasing three solo albums, Arli Liberman and Fata Morgana and Allegra published by Marigold Music. During this period, his original work developed into the experimental and ambient genres, leading to performances worldwide at MoMA, WOW, the worldwide mass mediations of Wonderlust along with the meditation app 1 Giant Mind,

In 2018 Arli joined Dusty Road agency in Auckland and is represented by Bruce Everett for film and television score commissions. His first full-length feature film for director Sam Kelly and producer Vicky Pope, "Savage" was released by Madman Entertainment in September 2020.

== Personal life ==
Liberman, the youngest of six children, was born in Beersheba, Israel, to Zvi and Michal Liberman. Due to his severe dyslexia, at 13 he was sent to Shafririm School in Givat Haim, where they discovered his gift for music. His partner is French photographer and director, Jen Raoult and they live in Titirangi, New Zealand with Coco her daughter.

== Musical collaborations ==
Whiteflag Project performed at various festivals worldwide such as the Montreux Jazz Festival in Switzerland and the Creation of Peace Festival in Russia. In 2005, Whiteflag Project went on to create an award-winning documentary Playing with the Enemy broadcast live on National Swiss Television. In 2008 the band made an appearance for Amnesty International and in 2008 they performed at the Global Peace Festival.

In 2007, Liberman was on the production team and played guitar for the world music project called Ras Hasatan – A Sinai Journey where 50 musicians from all over the world came together in the Sinai Desert, Egypt and created a unique world music album – featuring Israeli artist Mosh Ben-Ari – one of the songs went to the compilation album Putumayo.

At the age of 17, he performed with one of Israel's most prolific artists Shalom Hanoch who is considered to be the father of Israeli rock.

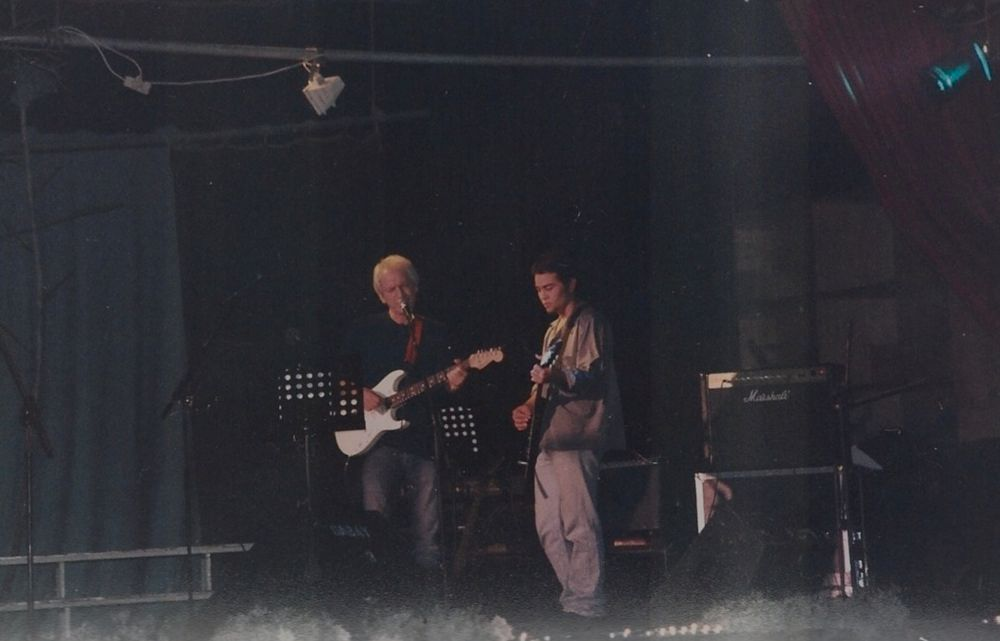
Arli Liberman performing with Shalom Hanoch in Givat Haim, Israel in 2004.

Since 2008, he has been a member of the band Zaviot – one of Israel's premier jazz groups. Zaviot was the most successful, original jazz group in Israel during the 1980s with performances worldwide – featuring clarinet player Harold Rubin. Zaviot performed in the first Red Sea Jazz Festival and won an award for the most original Israeli jazz group.

== Artistic style ==
Liberman's signature sound is a blend of Western and Middle Eastern influences from a blues and rock and roll perspective. He specializes in unique tones and phrasing, eastern scales, alternate chord voicings, song arrangement and phrase looping. In contrast with many players his effects enhance the music rather than his playing. He is constantly experimenting with new sounds through spontaneity and originality while being innovative and progressive through improvisation and expression.

== Discography ==
=== Soundtracks ===
- 2024 - Ka Whawhai Tonu (Original Feature Film) Directed by Mike Jonathan (Co-composed with Tiki Taane)
- 2024 - The Mountain (Original Feature Film) Directed by Rachel House (Original Score with music by Troy Kingi)
- 2023 - Stylebender (Documentary Film) Directed by Zoe McIntosh
- 2022 - Dame Valerie Adams: MORE THAN GOLD (Documentary Film) Directed by Briar March
- 2022 - Moko (TV Series)
- 2021 - Datsun (Original Short Film) Directed by Mark Albiston
- 2021 - Washday (Original Short Film) Directed by Kath Akuhata-Brown
- 2020 - Purea (Original Short Film) Directed by Kath Akuhata-Brown
- 2019 - Savage (Original Feature Film) Directed by Sam Kelly
- 2019 - Ways to See (Original Short Film) Directed by Jessica Sanderson

=== Solo ===
- 2013 – Arli Liberman – Self-titled
- 2015 - Fata Morgana
- 2016 - Allegra

=== Collaborations ===
- 2005 – Whiteflag – Exile – Guitarist
- 2005 – Shai Naus – The Time has Come – Guitarist, editor & recording engineer
- 2006 – Eyal Kofman – One second before – Guitarist
- 2006 – Chuloo – Oldspice – Guitarist
- 2006 – Har Ephraim – Guitarist & co-producer
- 2006 – Amir Estline – Reflections – Guitarist, recording engineer, editor & co-producer
- 2006 – SoulJa – Recording engineer
- 2007 – Anger Boys – Guitarist
- 2007 – Nagoa – Editor & assistant sound engineer
- 2007 – Theatre Broadway Manhattan, NY – Editor, recording engineer & sound engineer
- 2007 – Rockfour – Memories of the never happened – Editor & assistant sound engineer
- 2007 – Ras Hasatan (A Sinai Journey) – Guitarist, co-producer, sound engineer & editor
- 2008 – Kol Ha Ella (Voice of the Goddess) – Guitarist & editor
- 2008 – Rami Kleinstein Tribute song for Gilad Shalit – Sound engineer
- 2009 – Adi Dagan – Guitarist & assistant sound engineer
- 2009 – Whiteflag Project – Talk – Guitarist, co-producer & editor
- 2012 – Ngatapa Black – I Muri Ahiahi – Producer, arranger & guitarist – Nominated Best Maori Album of the Year at the New Zealand Music Awards 2013)

== TV/film appearances ==
- 2005 — Playing With The Enemy – with Whiteflag Project
- 2012 — Neighbourhood – Satellite Media
