= African Giants =

2024 film directed by Omar S. Kamara

- Directed by: Omar S. Kamara
- Written by: Omar S. Kamara
- Produced by: Leo Blumberg-Woll & Omar S. Kamara
- Starring: Dillon Daniel Mutyaba & Omete Anassi
- Cinematography: Jonas Fischer
- Edited by: Lily Judge
- Release date: 19 January 2024 (United States)
- Country: United States
- Language: English

African Giants is a 2024 drama film directed by Omar S. Kamara, starring Dillon Daniel Mutyaba and Omete Anassi. The film is Kamara's directorial feature debut.

The film first premiered in January 2024 at the Slamdance Film Festival, where it won the audience award for best narrative feature.

== Premise ==
The film tells the story of two Sierra Leone-American brothers over a weekend visit in Los Angeles, as they navigate the changing dynamics of brotherhood after a surprise announcement.

== Cast ==
- Dillon Daniel Mutyaba as Alhaji
- Omete Anassi as Sheku
- Kathlenn Kenny as Alice
- Tanyell Waivers as Cori
- Jerry Hernandez as Dagoberto
- Josh Lopez as Gio
- Scott Bender as Bernie
- Joy Ireland as Party Goer
- Carlen Clark as Party Goer / Friend
- Shmuel Sam Kraut as Bartender / Party Goer

== Release ==
After its premiere at the 2024 Slamdance Film Festival, Juno Films acquired worldwide rights to the project. The film holds a 100% Rotten Tomatoes score and was reviewed favorably by several outlets including Film Threat, The British Blacklist, and Eye for Film.
