= List of Afro Samurai characters =

This is the list of the characters that appear in the 1998 manga and 2007 anime miniseries Afro Samurai, the television film Afro Samurai: Resurrection, the video game adaption and other related media.

== Main characters ==
=== Afro Samurai ===
Child Afro Samurai Voiced by: Crystal Scales (anime), Kari Wahlgren (video game)
Teenager Afro Samurai Voiced by: Phil LaMarr
Adult Afro Samurai Voiced by: Samuel L. Jackson

Afro Samurai is the main protagonist of the series, who mourns for his father as a child and wears the Number Two headband on a quest to kill Justice and reclaim the Number One. As an adult, he often smoke hand-rolled cigarettes, drinks lemonade, and has a deep calm voice.

=== Ninja Ninja ===
Voiced by: Samuel L. Jackson

Ninja Ninja is Afro's partner, who mostly speaks in a normal voice while Afro refuses to reply in conversations. Ninja Ninja wears a ninja motif and has white hair. As the series progresses, Ninja Ninja watches Afro seeking vengeance. At the beginning of Episode 5, it is revealed that Kuma apparently kills Ninja Ninja who saves Afro. About halfway through the episode, Afro confronts Justice who states that he watched him shed his "imaginary friend."

In the collector's DVD, interviews with the staff and writers concede that Ninja Ninja is indeed imaginary. However, even though Ninja Ninja is "imaginary," he appears to have some form of presence in the real world, as well. When Brother 2 of the Empty Seven spies on Afro, Ninja Ninja can be clearly seen from Brother 2's point of view through the binoculars. Ninja Ninja also interacts with items around him constantly such as catching Afro's spliff in his mouth, moving a hanging pillar inside Otsuru's home, putting Otsuru's comb into Afro's hair, eating the food that was intended for Afro given by Brother 3 (as seen in the Director's cut) and throwing the Afro-Droid's microchip at Afro to cut in two. The idea of Ninja Ninja having at least a partial existence, in reality, is once again brought into light when he is 'killed' by Kuma. Because Kuma was such a skilled warrior and had the intent to cut down Afro on the sword strike that killed Ninja Ninja, it would seem odd that he would pause from his attack and have a conversation with Afro if there was not a reason to give pause which strengthens the idea that he was taken aback by Ninja Ninja sacrifice before attacking Afro again. Additionally supporting his real-world presence is the scene in the video game in which he knocks the hand of one of the Empty Seven off of a ledge, killing him, as is the scene after Sword Master's death in which one of the many clones of Ninja Ninja grabs Sword Master's mouth and moves it up in down, pretending he is a puppet.

In Afro Samurai: Resurrection, Ninja Ninja is confirmed to be emanated from the Number Two Headband in conjunction with the wearer's mind, restored to Afro with the band itself.

In the video game, Afro battles Ninja Ninja in his mind in order to regain his humanity which he lost as a result of being the Number Two.

=== Jinnosuke/"Kuma" ===
Voiced by: Yuri Lowenthal

Jinnosuke is a swordsman wearing a cybernetic teddy bear helmet (the same design as Otsuru's teddy bear from their time as children in their dojo) earning him the nickname "Kuma," (Bear in Japanese). He wears black keikogi, hakama and toe strapping metal geta sandals and wields twin katanas. He also considers Afro Samurai to be his best friend and brother. In the series, he blames Afro for killing their master and even taking the Number Two headband. Jinno mourns for the others from the dojo, suffers his wounds at the Midnight Battle Under the Bodhi Tree and falls from the cliff. He is rescued by Dharman who creates his robotic body. Afro seemingly destroys his life-support system to defeat Jinno, but he recovers his body, straps it with the rest of all ranked headbands as bandages and sees to fight with Afro who wears the Number 1 headband.

In Afro Samurai: Resurrection, he works with his younger sister Sio, who lived with her foster parents as a child. Jinno shortly had muted his voice and cannot converse with Sio until Rokutaro seemingly kills Afro. Jinno and Sio are impaled and killed by Rokutaro, before Jinno's electricity from his robotic body travels through Sio's blood and resurrects Afro.

In the video game, Jinno's transformation into Kuma is not explained and does not recognize Afro after confrontation. He recovers his memory of the schoolyard massacre as the two battle each other and then appears to die at the conclusion.

== Recurring characters ==
=== Supporting characters ===
==== Rokutaro ====
Voiced by: Greg Eagles

Afro's father and owner of the Number One headband who is decapitated by Justice, who mentions to Afro about the assassins fighting each other to the death for the headbands. Justice wears the Number One headband to become god while Afro wears the Number Two for revenge.

In Afro Samurai Resurrection, Sio and Jinno take Rokutaro's jawbone from his grave and help Dharman use it to resurrect Rokutaro as a clone. Sio kills Dharman for the loss of her henchmen leaving the mental recreation incomplete and makes him angry. After choking and seemingly killing Afro, Rokutaro impales Jinno and Sio with Afro's broken sword. Jinno's robotic body then uses electricity on Sio's blood near Afro to resurrect him. Afro defeats the cloned Rokutaro and takes both headbands.

==== Sword Master ====
Voiced by: Terrence C. Carson

The Sword Master is a one-eyed samurai adopting to train orphans as graduated warriors. He informs Afro Samurai that wearing special rank headbands would lead to murderous survival. At the cliff near the Bodhi Tree, the Sword Master wearing the Number Two headband, insists Afro to kill him. After the rest of all assassins and students were killed, Afro executes the Sword Master dead and takes the headband.

In the video game, the Sword Master and his older brother found and adopted Afro. Afto later kills the daimyō, suspecting him to be the Number Two. As he dies, the daimyō reveals the true identity of the Number Two. The incident triggers the schoolyard massacre carried out by the daimyō's men as an act of revenge.

The official site reveals that the Sword Master was Rokutaro's friend which helps explain the basis for his advice and world view.

==== Shichigoro ====
Voiced by: Liam O'Brien

Shichigoro is the owner of the Number Two headband and Kotaro's stepfather. Like the Sword Master, Shichigoro hides it and meets Afro, who saves Kotaro from the assassin. On the night for the Japanese rap parade festival, Shichigoro battles Afro before killing Sio's ninjas for stopping the party. Shichigoro inadvertently kills the DJ and Afro impales them dead.

In the manga, he and the Oden Shop Master used to work for the Empty Seven. Shichigoro betrayed the Empty Seven after the Oden Shop Master botched an assignment and had to protect him from the Empty Seven's Cleaners.

==== Kotaro ====
Voiced by: Zachary Gordon

Kotaro is Shichigoro's adopted son, who sadly vows revenge after Afro kills Shichigoro. In the manga, Kotaro is killed by Afro.

In the anime film, Afro hands the Number 2 headband to Kotaro and tells him to fight when they are ready.

==== Takimoto ====
Voiced by: Kevin Michael Richardson

Takimoto is a mysterious person who greets Justice in Afro Samurai: Resurrection.

In the manga, he holds a similar duty to Justice that the Empty Seven and Kuma held in the anime, protecting the "Number One" and defeating the current "Number Two." Although he explains himself as having the goal of observing the order of the world, seeing Afro about to reach the throne room made him ready to interfere. He even interacted with Ninja Ninja.

Depending on the possible third film, it is unknown if his motives and goals will be carried to the anime since many of the characters have similar but slightly altered parts in the manga.

=== Antagonists ===
==== The Empty Seven ====
Brother 1 Voiced by: Phil LaMarr
Brother 2 Voiced by: John DiMaggio
Brother 3 Voiced by: Phil LaMarr (Afro Samurai), Jeff Bennett (Afro Samurai: Resurrection)
Brother 4 Voiced by: Terrence C. Carson
Brother 5 Voiced by: Phil LaMarr
Brother 6 Voiced by: Greg Eagles

The Empty Seven (無無坊主) is a group of six monks who believe that attaining both ancient headbands will lead to immortality and godhood. They employ robots and mercenaries to do their dirty work, since the monks themselves have greatly inferior fighting skills when compared to Afro and Justice possibly due to their age difference. Brothers 1 through 5 look like identical wizened old men with long beards, dressed in robes with some other accessories:

- Brother 1 was the apparent leader of the Clan (although such an authority was never outright stated). His personality and mannerisms were a mixture of an Evangelical preacher and a street pimp. He was almost always seen with an almost nude beautiful woman at his side. As with most of the Clan, he was a wizened old man with a long beard and has a prosthetic gold left arm (which can be switched out for a machine gun). In an attempt to ambush Afro from atop the elevator leading to Kuma following the Afro Droid's destruction, Brother 1 ended up being paralyzed and held in a stretcher with a catheter by Brother 3 in Afro Samurai: Resurrection, making him the only monk to fight Afro directly and lose but survive. Brother One's woman is also seen in Afro Samurai: Resurrection working as a stripper in Brother 3's gambling house at which she excels perfectly.
- Brother 2 was the eyes of the Clan often seen scoping out Afro from a distance with a pair of high-tech binoculars. Usually Brother 6 was shown assisting him. All of his observations of Afro during his reconnaissance were reported to Brother 1 via cell phone. In combat, he was shown to use an extending Buddhist staff or kunai. When Otsuru turns against the Empty Seven for Afro's sake, it was Brother 2 who stabbed and killed her. Later when he was lying in wait to kill Afro, Afro surprises him from behind by swiftly poking his eyes and shoving his binoculars deep into the wounds. Likely the brutal manner of his execution was out of revenge for Otsuru.
- Brother 3 was unusual among the clan because he was the most laid-back of the brothers. While the other Brothers would plot Afro's death, Brother 3 was usually content to face away off in the corner, listening to his circumaural headphones and bobbing to the music. During the few times that he actually spoke, he was shown to have a Southern US accent. He seemed to have a much more pacifistic approach than his comrades regarding decisions. When deliberating on which assassin to choose to kill Afro, rather than settle things through violence Brother 3 suggested looking at their individual credentials. Later when Afro invaded the Empty Seven's temple, he was waiting by the door with tea and rice crackers prepared while calmly chanting Hachimaki o kudasai, (Japanese for "headband please.") simply asking for the Number Two Headband, rather than attempting combat for it. Afro didn't take the rice and tea offered to him, but Ninja Ninja did. Because of this, Brother 3 survived while the other monks were killed and injured. In Afro Samurai: Resurrection, Brother 3 uses the dice remote controller to change numbers, but Afro disqualifies him cheating the game.
- Brother 4 was a gruff deep-voiced monk in a green robe who usually carried a Buddhist staff and wore a metal kasa. He was usually seen side-by-side with Brother 5. In combat, Brother 4's weapon of choice was a sansetsukon. When determining which assassin would face Afro, Brother 4 insisted that Ivanov the Russian was the obvious choice which led to an argument with Brother 5 who held opposing views and felt Foo from China was more capable. Brother 1 settled the issue by suggesting a battle royale, an idea which greatly appealed to both 4 & 5. Later after Brother 6's defeat at Afro's hands, Brothers 4 & 5 launched out from where they were concealed in Brother 6's backpack and attempted to gang up on Afro from both sides. This tactic failed miserably and both monks were easily killed.
- Brother 5 was the arrogant and sadistic monk who wore a plain white robe, regularly smoked a long pipe, and spoke with a high squeaky voice. In combat, Brother 4's weapon of choice was a jian (in the manga, he wields a tantō). When determining which assassin would face Afro, Brother 4 insisted that Ivanov the Russian was the obvious choice which led to an argument with Brother 5 who held opposing views and felt Foo from China was more capable. Brother 1 settled the issue by suggesting a battle royale, an idea which greatly appealed to both 4 & 5. Later after Brother 6's defeat at Afro's hands, Brothers 4 & 5 launched out from where they were concealed in Brother 6's backpack and attempted to gang up on Afro from both sides. This tactic failed miserably and both monks were easily killed. In the manga, Afro Samurai kicks Brother 5 over the waterfall and is later found dead in the water face down.
- Brother 6 was a large, muscled individual with cold inhuman eyes in monk regalia who wore a metal kasa. He was the only Brother who didn't resemble an old monk with a long beard. As mentioned in the manga, his true name is Rokutaro and he is the youngest of the Empty 7. Violent and impulsive, Brother 6 never hesitated to use excessive force in his actions. In combat, he wielded a long Buddhist staff and a backpack holding a variety of weapons, including a rocket-propelled grenade launcher and a flame thrower. Brother 6 was the man who rescued Jinnosuke and Otsuru from the brink of death, but regarding Jinnosuke felt it would have been more merciful to just let him die. He was the one to burn down Otsuru's home and blew up the bridge after Afro's initial confrontation with Afro Droid (much to Brother 1's displeasure). When that tactic failed, Brother 6 fought Afro one-on-one. He proved a difficult opponent and when defeated held Afro's sword within his body, disarming the samurai so that Brothers 4 & 5 could have the advantage over Afro.

In the video game, Brother 7 is said be God himself and that one becomes a God by sacrificing the other six Brothers where they each fell into the rotating blades. Brother 2 does this while attempting to use Afro to take his place. However, Afro Samurai defeats the rest of the brothers, after his fight with Jinno while Brother 3 throws his own blood into the rotating blades before leaving the rest to the Empty Seven's robots.

==== Otsuru/"Okiku" ====
Okiku Voiced by: Kelly Hu
Otsuru Voiced by: Tara Strong (anime), Lexi Jourdan (video game)

Otsuro is a young woman who specializes in the art of healing, cooking and adores fireworks. As a child, she meets Afro in the shrine after he lost the Number Two headband, and took him to the Sword Master's dojo. That night, Otsuru finds herself to witness that the rest of the assassins and the Sword Master's pupils are killed. Otsuru survives and joins up with the Empty Seven Clan as an agent working for Brother 1.

Years later, Otsuru saves Afro, who survives Soshun's poisonous crossbow infection and Brother 6's RPG explosion on the cliff. Though Otsuru changes her name to "Okiku", she spends time with Afro at the bamboo forest. She uses her unique ability to siphon memories from anyone's dream and copies Afro's sword style for the Afro Droid. She attempts to kill Afro, but she realizes her mistake. Brother 2 then kills Otsuru for helping Afro and betraying the Empty Seven.

In the video game adaptation, Okiku is the assassin who works for the Empty Seven Clan. Brother 2 and Brother 6 later kill her for helping Afro avoid getting captured and after falling in love with him.

==== Dharman ====
Voiced by: Phil LaMarr (normal version), S. Scott Bullock (Director's Cut version and "Afro Samurai: Resurrection")

Dharman is an insane cyborg scientist employed by the Empty Seven Clan to build their machine-ninja army and the Afro-Droid. He repairs Jinnosuke's body with his protective "Teddy Bear" helmet. His name comes from the fact that he closely resembles a Japanese Dharma doll. When Afro defeats Jinnosuke, it is likely that Dharman was the one who repaired and rebuilt him. He was assumed by many fans to be Brother #7, as indicated when Brother #1 refers to him as "brother," but the official site states that this is in fact not the case. He also does not like to think of himself as part of the group, referring to them in the third person in the second-to-last chapter.

In Afro Samurai: Resurrection, Dharman works for Sio in her vicious plan to get revenge on Afro. Using advanced bio-technology, he is able to create a clone of Afro's father from a jawbone that Sio stole from the warrior's grave. He rebuilds Sio's foster family members Bin, Michael and Tomoe into cybernetic warriors. Dharman is aroused by Sio's seductive beauty and sadistic nature as she toys with him although he scolds her for interrupting Rokutaro's resurrection process. Before resurrecting Rokutaro, Sio stabs to kill Dharman for insisting her henchmen into fighting with Afro.

==== Afro-Droid ====
The Afro-Droid is a semi-sentient robot copy of Afro Samurai created by the Empty Seven Clan. Otsuru created it from combat data siphoned from Afro's mind, and reproduces all of his learned techniques and abilities. While Afro Samurai and Afro-Droid are identical, Afro-Droid is equipped with guns, lasers and explosives. In the third episode after fighting through from the air to the ground, Afro destroys the robot and the memory chip.

==== Justice ====
Voiced by: Ron Perlman

The villainous gunslinger who kills Rokutaro and takes the Number One headband. At the end of the miniseries, he stays at the throne room to live at Mount Shumi where Afro cut his pair of arms along with the third one behind holding a sword for execution. After Justice regenerates himself and declare that all ranked headbands on corpses would remain there, Afro slices his body to smaller pieces.

During interviews for the DVD, it is stated that Justice and Rokutaro were in fact part of the same swordsmen clan and friends. However, their differing views on the headbands and how to end the violence plaguing the world eventually drove them apart, leading to the final confrontation between them.

In the manga and video game, Afro discovers that Justice is long-dead at the lair. Afro forcingly confronts his guilt for revenge. Afro resists the sins to break free from his past and kill Justice.

He also appears in Afro Samurai: Resurrection without speaking, one being crucified in Afro's dream with Rokutaro and the other meets Takimoto in the afterlife.

==== Foster Family ====
===== Lady Sio =====
Adult Sio Voiced by: Lucy Liu
Young Sio Voiced by: Ariel Winter

Lady Sio is Jinno's younger sister appearing in Afro Samurai Resurrection. She asks Jinno to kill Afro, but Jinno refuses, calling Afro "his brother" of the sword and had a stronger bond. Unlike Otsuru, Sio and her brother are orphans who, with Afro, went to train with the Sword Master. Sio apparently lives with her wealthy and powerful foster family who had their own castle, and their replaced daughter, who treats Sio as a princess. Sio learns and dislikes that Afro killed her foster family though the words of her servant, Tomoe, imply that their lands were destroyed in the chaos that ensued after Afro takes the Number One headband from Justice, which means that her family's death is not Afro's fault. Rokutaro impales Sio and Jinno's damaged body with the broken sword.

===== Bin =====
Voiced by: Mark Hamill

Bin is Sio's protector. When Sio was young, he was part of her foster family and always made people laugh because of the funny mask he wore. But after the town where he lived was destroyed (Sio blames Afro for this event), he was almost killed and was reconstructed by the mad professor Dharman as a cybernetic fighter (similar to Jinno's situation). Now no longer laughing, but a hateful shell of the man he once was, he wears the same humorous Hyottoko mask that he had in the past to conceal his robotic appearance. Bin usually carries a boom box that can fire metal spikes and is capable of turning his left hand into a blade and his right hand into a laser cannon as well as using his robotic feet to make huge leaps. He and the other henchmen despise Afro because they consider him responsible for their loss of humanity and desire to kill him in order to prevent Sio from becoming a murderer. After the other two henchmen are destroyed, he grabs Afro's leg with his last strength and wants to detonate himself in order to kill him but Afro disposes of him by kicking his head off.

===== Michael =====
Similar to Bin, Michael was part of Sio's foster family and used to entertain people by dressing in a dragon costume. He was also reconstructed by the scientist Dharman as a cyborg after he had suffered nearly fatal injuries. He wears a cloak and a red dragon mask which fires flames and rockets when it opens its mouth. After Afro dispatches the mask and the cloak covering his body, it is revealed that the only organic parts that are left from him are his head and torso, the rest of his body being cybernetic and having attached a pair of long, metallic chains and a huge machine gun on it. Tomoe grabs Afro and begs Michael to shoot them with his machine gun, he at first refuses to do it, fearing that he might kill her, but at Bin's request he decides to fire at them. Afro instead uses Tomoe as a human shield, and therefore, she is completely destroyed by Michael's bullets. He is killed by Afro, who first destroys his metallic legs, then cuts him in half with his blade.

NOTE: Michael does not have a voice actor as he can not speak, being able to communicate only through his glasses that serve as a digital display for words and images.

===== Tomoe =====
Voiced by: Grey DeLisle

Part of her foster family, Tomoe was a woman who was seen holding a shamisen (guitar-like Japanese instrument) and was very kind to Sio (teaching her to dance among other things). Like the other two henchmen, she became a cyborg assassin after the tragic event that occurred in her town. She wears a wide hat and holds the same instrument that she used to sing at in the past, now being capable of turning it into a deadly weapon. Also, she wears a Noh Mask that resembles her old appearance in order to hide her burnt face. Her jet-propelled cybernetic feet allow her to fly, and her enhanced muscular tissue adds more power to her strikes, thus making her a worthy opponent. She is able to injure Afro with her weapon, and after she grabs him with her enhanced arm, she is willing to sacrifice herself by telling Michael to shoot them with his machinegun. But Afro manages to poke her eyes out and use her as a shield in the way of Michael's bullets. After being torn apart by the bullets, her damaged cybernetic body explodes, thus ending her life.

== Guest characters ==
=== Minor characters ===
- DJ (voiced by RZA) - A disc jockey rapper who is inadvertently killed by Shichigoro during his duel with Afro Samurai at the parade festival.
- Daigo "Big Boy" - Exclusive to the manga, Daigo "Big Boy" is one of the students of the Sword Master. His goal is to become the World's Greatest Chef. He doesn't get to live up to his goal since he was killed in the Midnight Battle Under the Bodhi Tree.
- Fu (voiced by Jeff Bennett) - A trickster assassin from the Hunan Province of China who was hired by the Empty Seven. He is considered to be one of the world's most capable assassins, and describes himself as "first among men and machines". Brother 5 believes that Fu could have defeated Afro, but Brother 4 disagrees about this stating that Ivanoff would have been more suitable. He is killed along with every other assassin that charged toward the Afro Droid (his appearance was in the Director's Cut DVD). His name may be a reference to Kasumi Fu from Samurai Champloo which has been stated as a leading inspiration behind Afro Samurai.
- Gorokube - Exclusive to the manga, Gorokube is a warlord who is contracted by the Empty Seven to target Afro Samurai. Wielding an RPG and a mini-gun, Gorokube attacks Afro Samurai during a parade. His arsenal does give Afro Samurai some trouble until Afro Samurai manages to kill Gorokube and his minions.
- Hachiro (voiced by Jeff Bennett) - In Afro's flashback, he and his brothers were the ones who attacked young Afro some time after Justice killed Rokutaro. After young Afro attacked his brother Yashichi, Hachiro later attacked him. With some help from Jinno, Afro managed to kill Hachiro.
- Ivanov (voiced by John DiMaggio) - A Russian assassin hired by the Empty Seven. He is considered one of the world's best assassins, and describes himself as "second to no man". Brother 4 believes that Ivanov could have defeated Afro, but Brother 5 disagrees about this. He is killed along with every other assassin that charged towards the Afro Droid (his appearance was in the Director's Cut DVD).
- Jiro (voiced by Tara Strong) - He is one of the students of the Sword Master. Jiro is killed in the Midnight Battle Under the Bodhi Tree.
- Juzo (voiced by Fred Tatasciore) -
- Kazuma - Exclusive to the manga, Kazuma is one of the students of the Sword Master and is the talkative of the bunch. His fate was unknown since he wasn't seen during the Midnight Battle Under the Bodhi Tree.
- Matasaburo (voiced by Dave Wittenberg) - One of the students of the Sword Master who is killed by assassins at the Midnight Battle Under the Bodhai Tree.
- Sasuke (voiced by Jason Marsden) is a teenage student of Sword Master and a friend to both Afro and Jinno. He wears a pair of glasses which are held to the face by string (similar to those worn in feudal Japan and late dynastic China). Though he graduated from swordsman school at the same time as Afro and Jinno, his skills are apparently inferior to theirs (though he is seen killing two people in his final battle). He appears to be very eccentric as shown by his playful manner with his friends as well as telling his friends that he hopes to eat chicken cutlet for his final meal, much to their disbelief. During a flashback in the fourth episode, he is impaled and being killed behind by one of the assassins in the Midnight Battle Under The Bodhi Tree.
- O-Sachi - Exclusive to the manga, O-Sachi is a young woman who found Afro Samurai following his slaying of the Empty Seven and his fight with Kuma. She belongs to an isolated community that follows the teachings of "The One." As she cares for Afro Samurai, she seems to develop an attraction to him and it appears that Afro Samurai might reciprocate. Unfortunately, it turns out that "The One" would probably be more accurately referred to as "Number One". When she learns that Afro cannot forgive Justice and intends to kill him despite all the good he's done, she attempts to kill Afro first since Afro Samurai had previously killed her sister. This leads to Afro slaughtering the entire community.
- Oden Shop Master (voiced by Mark Hamill) - The Oden Shop Master is the unnamed owner of an oden shop, Shichigoro friend, and Kotaro's caretaker. In the manga, he and Shichigoro used to work for the Empty Seven. Shichigoro protected the owner from the Empty Seven's cleaners after he botched up assignments.
- Soshun (voiced by John Kassir) - A man who comes from the Land of the Weapon Masters of the West. He wielded a giant crossbow with a grenade launcher. He first saw Afro in a bar and learned the history of the headbands from its bartender. He encountered Afro on the mountain when Ninja Ninja detected him. In his battle against Afro, Soshun was killed by Afro. Though one of his poisoned arrows had grazed Afro and resulting in his temporary handicap against his first encounter with Brother 6.
- Thugs (voiced by Dwight Schultz and Dave Wittenberg) - Seemingly endless hordes of men in various costumes seek the Number Two headband throughout the series. When fighting any of the major characters they inevitably chuckle menacingly before dying in huge numbers and in various states of dismemberment.
- Yashichi (voiced by James Arnold Taylor) - He is the brother of Hachiro and was with him in their first attack upon young Afro. Some time later, young Afro managed to interrogate him for the info on who has the Number Two Headband before killing him.

=== Video game characters ===
The following were exclusive to the Afro Samurai video game:

- Ashura Brothers - The Ashura Brothers are Afro Samurai's first opponents in the Lowdown East Pass level where Brother 2 and Brother 6 sent to attack him, but Afro kills them.
- Daimyo (voiced by W. Morgan Sheppard) - In the video game, the Daimyo is the oldest brother of the Sword Master. The Daimyo presides over the province where the Sword Master's dojo is located. He and his brother do not share the same wisdom and had also known Rokutaro. The Daimyo and the Sword Master found a young Afro Samurai in a beaten up state and carrying the skull of Rokutaro in his backpack. A teenage Afro Samurai later raided his palace in search of the identity of the Number Two. The Daimyo claims that there are no sacred headbands. Before he dies following a fight with Afro Samurai, the Daimyo states that the Sword Master is the Number Two. The Daimyo's remaining men later attack the Sword Master's school in retaliation for the Daimyo's death.
- Hanjiro (voiced by John Kassir) -
- Keisuke - A warrior whom Afro killed.
- Masaki - A warrior whom Afro killed.
- Osachi (voiced by Kelly Hu) -
- Polecats (voiced by Mary Elizabeth McGlynn) - A group of dancers and assassins that work for the Daimyo and served as line of defenses when teenage Afro Samurai raided his palace.
- Takamori - A warrior who follows Okiku and attacks Afro Samurai and attempts to take the Number 2 headband, but he is killed.
- The Wild Five - The Wild Five are a group of five armored samurai in the mountains where Afro Samurai defeats them.
