= Smelly (performer) =

Japanese comedian (born 1971)

- スメリー
- Born: Dai Okazaki; January 13, 1971 (age 55); Japan
- Other name: Smelly
- Occupations: Manga artist (former), comedian, outsider musician
- Years active: 1998-current
- Employer: Mr. Kitazawa
- Known for: Nou Nou Hau; Suki Suki Smelly; Takeshi no Dare Demo Picasso
- Relatives: Takashi Okazaki
- Website: www.kugel-blitz.com/en/nounouhau/smelly.php

Dai Okazaki (岡崎太威, Okazaki Dai), more commonly known by his stagename Smelly (スメリー, Sumerī), (born January 13, 1971) is a Japanese comedic performer and former manga artist. Dai Okazaki is a relative of Takashi Okazaki, the creator of Afro Samurai.

== Career ==
Dai Okazaki was one out of four people to debut in the line up of Nou Nou Hau issue 0, with his brother Takashi Okazaki, Ryoji Shibasaki and Mai Shibasaki in November 1998. At the time, Dai Okazaki was a dōjinshi manga artist. In issue 2 of March 1999, Dai Okazaki contacted Meywa Denki for a long period of time to interview him in the "Nou Hau Talk" section of the magazine. Later on that year, Dai Okazaki was asked to go on the famous show Takeshi no Dare Demo Picasso, and then went under the pseudonym "Smelly", taken from an old nickname of Michael Jackson's. The third issue of Nou Nou Hau was released at the same time as when Dai Okazaki became famous on Takeshi no Dare Demo Picasso in May 1999 and featured a picture of him on it, which made the magazine increase in sales. Also, in issue 3, Dai Okazaki started a Smelly manga series, which was said to be very different from the live performances. In October 1999, issue 4 of Nou Nou Hau, Dai started the serialized manga Bijutsu Techō (美術手帖) in that issue. In 2000, Dai Okazaki played at the Hakone Open-Air Museum and Rotterdam Film Festival, and in 2001 appeared on a promotional video for Takkyu Ishino, and played at PostPet exercise. At the Nou Nou Hau exhibition "Show Yavay!!!," Dai Okazaki played a live performance in 2002. In 2003, Dai also played at the opening ceremony for Mori Art Museum in 2003 and at the program exhibition for the Kirishima Open-Air Museum. As well as just performing in Japan, Dai also performed in New York City, Bangkok, Roma, and Berlin. In 2005, Dai Okazaki collaborated again with Tōhō Rikimaru, who previously appeared on Geisai 7 by Takashi Murakami. Smelly was also quoted and interviewed in the Michael Jackson article "Big in Japan" by Bryan Walsh in 2007.

== Works ==
Smelly started doing work in the Nou Nou Hau magazine, as previously mentioned, and created two manga serializations, Smelly and Bijutsu Techō. Smelly later went on to participate in Takeshi no Dare Demo Picasso which made him famous later on. Smelly is also famous for creating the promotion video Suki Suki Smelly (スキスキスメリー, Suki Suki Sumeri), where he sings "Ikkyū-san" along with "September" by Earth, Wind & Fire, with psychedelic imagery parodying "Let's Groove," also by Earth, Wind & Fire. Smelly's work combines art, music, theater, and comedy all in one and has also stated that he gets much of his influence from Michael Jackson and that he would gladly pay $400 for a ticket to one of his shows. Smelly has also released some merchandise, such as "Smelly's book" and "Smelly's puzzle box". Smelly also wrote volume 5 of Cho-Kōryu-Gōjin Danke Choen (超交流合神ダンケシェーン) entitled "Dancing All Night" which appeared as a part of the serial in a monthly flyer for the Japanese club "UNIT".

Dai produced and designed his own personal website named "handicappers" on biglobe.ne.jp from 1998 to 2003. Dai Okazaki lost domain name and the website now appears as a broken link.
