= Afro Samurai 2 =

2015 video game

Afro Samurai 2: Revenge of Kuma
- Developer: Redacted Studios
- Publisher: Versus Evil
- Platforms: PlayStation 4 Windows
- Release: September 22, 2015
- Genre: Action-adventure
- Mode: Single-player

Afro Samurai 2: Revenge of Kuma is a 2015 action-adventure video game developed by Redacted Studios and published by Versus Evil. It was released for PlayStation 4 via PlayStation Network and Windows in September 2015. As the sequel to 2009's Afro Samurai, based on the manga series by Takashi Okazaki, the player controls Kuma, a swordsman who seeks revenge on the titular character.

The game received widely negative reviews from critics. Originally planned to be released in three volumes, Versus Evil pulled Revenge of Kuma from all platforms, issued refunds, and canceled the other two volumes. An Xbox One version was planned but never released, and the PlayStation 4 version is one of the few titles that are not backwards compatible with the PlayStation 5.

== Gameplay ==
Similar to the first installment, Afro Samurai 2 is a third-person action game where the player must work through a series of areas taking down waves of enemies. Learning different moves and combos are key to getting through the game.

== Plot ==
In Afro Samurai 2, Afro once again fights Kuma who is challenging him for his Number One headband.

== Development ==
Afro Samurai 2 was developed by Redacted Studios and published by Versus Evil. After the release of the original Afro Samurai game in 2009, former Namco Bandai senior producer David Robinson left the company and founded Redacted Studios. Along with leaving Namco Bandai, he secured the rights to make other games in the series.

Afro Samurai 2's story was written by Jim DeFelice, co-writer of American Sniper. The soundtrack to the game was done by rapper RZA, who also produced two soundtrack albums of the animated series. The game's still image cutscenes was done by series creator Takashi Okazaki.

The game was released for the PlayStation Network and Microsoft Windows on September 22, 2015. An Xbox One version was also planned to be released on October 9, but was canceled due to poor reception on the other platforms.

The PlayStation 4 version is not playable on the PlayStation 5 with backwards compatibility.

== Reception ==
Reception

Aggregate score
Aggregator	Score
Metacritic	21/100 (PS4)

Review scores
Publication	Score
Destructoid	1/10
GameSpot	2/10
Hardcore Gamer	1.5/5
PlayStation LifeStyle	2/10

Upon release, Afro Samurai 2: Revenge of Kuma received widely negative reviews from critics.

Polygon called it one of the worst games of 2015. Giant Bomb called it the worst game of the year. It was the second worst-reviewed game of 2015 according to aggregate review website Metacritic.

=== Withdrawal and cancelled trilogy ===
In November 2015, Afro Samurai 2 was pulled from the PSN and Steam. In an interview with CGMagazine on the game's withdrawal, Versus Evil's Steve Escalante called the game "a failure" and announced the cancellation of the other two volumes and refunds for customers. Escalante later expanded on the decision in an interview with Gamasutra, saying, "Given the game quality was not what people were expecting, it didn't sell like hot cakes, let's just put it like that."
