= Antihero (disambiguation) =

Antihero is a protagonist who lacks conventional heroic qualities such as idealism, courage, or morality.

Antihero may also refer to:

== Music ==
- Anti-Heros (band), an American Oi!/street punk band

=== Albums ===
- Antihero (album), a 2022 album by Huskii
- Anti-Hero (Slaine and Termanology album), 2017
- Anti-Heroes (Lee Konitz and Gil Evans album), 1980
- Anti-Heroes (Auryn album), 2013

=== Songs ===
- "Anti-Hero" (song), a 2022 song by Taylor Swift from Midnights
- "Anti Hero (Brave New World)", a 2012 song by Marlon Roudette
- "Anti-Hero", a 2010 song by Bleeding Through from Bleeding Through
- "Anti-Hero", a 2014 song by the Smashing Pumpkins from Monuments to an Elegy
- "Anti-Hero", a 2017 song by Slaine and Termanology from Anti-Hero
- "Anti-Hero", a 2019 song by Sekai no Owari from Eye
- "Anti-Hero", a 2022 song by Lil Wayne from the streaming edition of Sorry 4 the Wait

== Other uses ==
- Antihero (video game), a 2017 video game
- "Anti-Hero", an episode of American TV series Superman & Lois
- AntiHero skateboards, an American skateboard company founded in 1995, also referred to as AntiHero and Anti Hero
