= NNH (disambiguation) =

NNH may refer to:

- Number needed to harm, an epidemiological measure
- nnh, the ISO 639-3 code for Ngiemboon language
- Nou Nou Hau, an avant-garde dōjinshi manga anthology
- Natal Native Horse
