= Wintermoor Tactics Club =

- Developer: EVC Games
- Publisher: Versus Evil
- Platforms: Windows; Nintendo Switch; PlayStation 4; Xbox One
- Release: Windows; May 5, 2020; Switch, PS4, Xbox One; September 10, 2020
- Genre: Tactical role-playing
- Mode: Single-player

Wintermoor Tactics Club is a tactical role-playing game developed by EVC Games and published by Versus Evil in 2020. Gameplay combines elements of turn-based tactics and visual novels as players attempt to save a high school club from being disbanded.

== Gameplay ==
Players control a group of high school students who belong to an after-school club, the Wintermoor Tactics Club. The principal tells them that a series of snowball fights will determine if the sole after-school club is allowed to remain. The club members must use their knowledge of role-playing games to win the championship. Players also manage the Tactics Club's interactions with other students, which was inspired by visual novels. As the Tactics Club defeats other clubs, they recruit new members from them and gain more options in combat.

== Development ==
The game's development was documented by HitSave!, a video game preservation organization. It was released for Windows on May 5 and for Nintendo Switch, PlayStation 4, and Xbox One on September 10, 2019.

== Reception ==
Wintermoor Tactics Club received positive reviews on Metacritic. RPGamer said it is a "tightly paced, well balanced alternative" to the Persona series. RPGFan said the game may be too easy for hardcore tactical role-playing game fans, but the reviewer enjoyed the uncomplicated gameplay and immersive world. Praising the narrative and combat, Gamereactor UK called it "one the most delightful indie titles I have played this year". NintendoWorldReport praised the game's "accessible gameplay and charming story beats" but suggested interested people play it on Windows because of performance problems on the Switch.
