= Versus Evil =

US-based video game publisher

Versus Evil LLC
- Type: Subsidiary
- Industry: Video games
- Founded: September 2013; 13 years ago
- Founder: Steve Escalante
- Defunct: December 22, 2023; 2 years ago
- Headquarters: Baltimore, Maryland, US
- Key people: Steve Escalante; Lance James; Francis Fincke
- Products: The Banner Saga series Pillars of Eternity II: Deadfire
- Parent: tinyBuild (2021–2023)
- Subsidiaries: Red Cerberus
- Website: versusevil.com

Versus Evil LLC was an American video game publisher founded by former ZeniMax Online Studios marketing director Steve Escalante to focus on the independent video game market. Versus Evil was bought by another publisher, tinyBuild, in November 2021. On December 22, 2023, all Versus Evil staff were laid off and the company was shut down.

== History ==
Versus Evil was founded in September 2013. On January 14, 2014, Versus Evil launched Stoic's role-playing strategy game, The Banner Saga, which received praise as one of the top indie titles of 2014. Versus Evil continued to spread its distribution throughout the globe by launching Dragons and Titans, a free-to-play multiplayer online battle arena game, and the Steam Early Access version of Habitat, which it expected to launch at retail in 2015. In August 2014 at Gamescom in Cologne, Germany, Versus Evil announced several key developer partnerships including Tangrin Studios, based in the Netherlands, who were working on an action role-playing title, Kyn, and SwordTales, a Brazilian indie developer, who were working on their first video game, Toren, a puzzle platform adventure game. Also part of this announcement was the sequel to the third-person action game Afro Samurai, called Afro Samurai 2: Revenge of Kuma, being developed by indie developer Redacted Studios. In September 2014, Versus Evil launched their first mobile title by bringing The Banner Saga to the iPhone, iPad and iPod Touch.

On February 8, 2021, the Nintendo Switch port of Pillars of Eternity was abandoned by Versus Evil while still containing significant bugs, with no refunds offered.

In November 2021, tinyBuild acquired Versus Evil and Red Cerberus. In December 2023, tinyBuild reported that it had settled a legal dispute with Versus Evil general manager Steve Escalante, head of production James Lance, and previous owner Stall Proof LLC, who had filed a claim that tinyBuild had failed to make "timely capital contributions" to the studio. Escalante had also separately claimed that $3 million in shares and options had not been paid. TinyBuild settled the matter for $3.5 million plus legal costs. Escalante subsequently left the company. On December 22, the entire Versus Evil staff was laid off. All Versus Evil releases, including upcoming titles, were moved over to tinyBuild.

In August 2024, Steve Escalante and Lance James announced the formation of Digital Bandidos, a new publisher aimed at funding indie games and acquiring new and established intellectual property.

In April 2025, tinyBuild sold Red Cerberus to TestFly for an initial price of $1.5 million, which was later reduced to $1.1 million after standard post-completion adjustments.

== Games published ==
Year	Game	Developer	Platform(s)
2013	The Banner Saga: Factions	Stoic	Microsoft Windows, macOS
2014	The Banner Saga	Stoic	Microsoft Windows, macOS, Linux, iOS, Android, PlayStation 4, PlayStation Vita, Xbox One, Nintendo Switch
2014	Tower of Guns	Terrible Posture Games	Microsoft Windows, macOS, Linux, iOS, Android, PlayStation 3, PlayStation 4, Xbox One
2014	Dragons and Titans	Wyrmbyte	Microsoft Windows, macOS, Linux
2014	Habitat: A Thousand Generations in Orbit	4Gency	Microsoft Windows, macOS, Linux, PlayStation 4
2015	Toren	Swordtales	Microsoft Windows, macOS, PlayStation 4
2015	Guild of Dungeoneering	Gambrinous	Microsoft Windows
2015	Kyn	Tangrin Entertainment	Microsoft Windows, PlayStation 4, PlayStation Vita
2015	Armikrog	Pencil Test Studios	Microsoft Windows, macOS, Linux, PlayStation 4, Xbox One
2015	Skyshine's Bedlam	Skyshine Games	Microsoft Windows, macOS
2015	Afro Samurai 2	Redacted Studios	Microsoft Windows, PlayStation 4
2016	The Banner Saga 2	Stoic	Microsoft Windows, PlayStation 4, Xbox One, Nintendo Switch
2016	Armikrog	Pencil Test Studios	Microsoft Windows, macOS, Linux, Wii U, PlayStation 4, Xbox One
2017	Faeria	Abrakam	Microsoft Windows, macOS, Linux, Nintendo Switch, PlayStation 4, Xbox One
2017	Antihero	Tim Conkling	Microsoft Windows, macOS, iOS, Android
2017	Let Them Come	Tuatara Games	Microsoft Windows, MacOS, PlayStation 4, Xbox One
2018	Pillars of Eternity II: Deadfire	Obsidian Entertainment	Microsoft Windows, macOS, Linux, PlayStation 4, Xbox One
2018	Mothergunship	Grip Digital; Terrible Posture Games	Microsoft Windows, PlayStation 4, Xbox One
2018	The Banner Saga 3	Stoic	Microsoft Windows, macOS, Nintendo Switch, PlayStation 4, Xbox One
2019	At Sundown: Shots in the Dark	Mild Beast	Microsoft Windows, macOS, Linux, Nintendo Switch, PlayStation 4, Xbox One
2019	Pillars of Eternity: Complete Edition	Obsidian Entertainment	Nintendo Switch
2019	Into the Dead 2	PikPok	Nintendo Switch
2019	Cardpocalypse	Gambrinous	Microsoft Windows, MacOS, PlayStation 4, iOS
2019	Yaga	Breadcrumbs Interactive	Microsoft Windows, MacOS, Nintendo Switch, PlayStation 4, Xbox One, iOS
2020	Wintermoor Tactics Club	EVC Games	Microsoft Windows, Nintendo Switch, PlayStation 4, Xbox One
2021	Jumpala	Yokereba	Microsoft Windows, MacOS
2021	Holodrive	BitCake Studio	Microsoft Windows
2021	Hitchhiker: A Mystery Game	Mad About Pandas	Microsoft Windows, macOS, Linux, PlayStation 4, PlayStation 5, iOS
2021	Almighty: Kill Your Gods	RunWild Entertainment	Microsoft Windows
2021	Sockventure	Nighthouse Games	Microsoft Windows
2021	UnMetal	Unepic Entertainment	Microsoft Windows, Nintendo Switch, PlayStation 4, Xbox One
2021	First Class Trouble	Invisible Walls	Microsoft Windows, macOS, Linux, PlayStation 4, PlayStation 5
2021	Hand of Merlin	Room-C Games; Croteam	Microsoft Windows
2022	Eville	VestGames	Microsoft Windows, Nintendo Switch, PlayStation 4, PlayStation 5, Xbox One, Xbox Series X/S
2023	Stray Souls	Jukai Studio	Microsoft Windows, PlayStation 4, PlayStation 5, Xbox One, Xbox Series X/S
2024	Astor: Blade of the Monolith	C2 Game Studio	Microsoft Windows, Nintendo Switch, PlayStation 4, PlayStation 5, Xbox One, Xbox Series X/S
2024	Lil' Guardsman	Hilltop Studios	Microsoft Windows, Nintendo Switch, PlayStation 4, PlayStation 5, Xbox One
2024	Broken Roads	Drop Bear Bytes	Microsoft Windows, Nintendo Switch, Xbox Series X/S
2024	Tamarak Trail	Yarrow Games	Microsoft Windows
