= Almighty: Kill Your Gods =

2021 Open-world Multiplayer role-playing game

- Developer(s): RUNWILD Entertainment
- Publisher(s): Versus Evil
- Engine: Unreal Engine 4
- Platform(s): Microsoft Windows
- Release: 5 May 2021
- Genre(s): MMO, Role-playing game
- Mode(s): Multiplayer, Single Player

Almighty: Kill Your Gods is a multiplayer role-playing game developed by RUNWILD Entertainment and published by Versus Evil. It utilities game genres like action-adventure, crafting, character customisation, hack and slash and fantasy elements.

== Gameplay ==
The game allows the player to pick either female or male gender for their character and over the time of playing. The player is tasked with managing their island, sourcing materials and food for the island and protecting the island from evil demigods and creatures. The game can be played either online with other players or alone. The premise of the game is to level up your character by completing quests and improving skills. The game has a similar theme to the Elder Scrolls Online with the fantasy and magic powers the player can gain.

== Release ==
Versus Evil released the game in early access and the game is currently in early access with updates continuing to improve the gameplay and other problems.
