= Dink, the Little Dinosaur =

American animated television series

- Title screen
- Starring: R. J. Williams; Anndi McAfee; Ben Ryan Ganger; S. Scott Bullock; Frank Welker
- Narrated by: Kenneth Mars
- Composer: John Debney
- Country of origin: United States
- No. of seasons: 2
- No. of episodes: 21 (42 segments)

Production
- Running time: 30 minutes (2 segments)
- Production company: Ruby-Spears Enterprises

Original release
- Network: CBS
- Release: September 16, 1989 – November 3, 1990

Dink, the Little Dinosaur is an American animated series created by Karen Willson and Chris Weber, produced by Ruby-Spears Enterprises. The series originally aired as part of CBS's Saturday morning line-up from 1989 to 1990.

== Plot ==
The series followed Dink (a dinosaur) and his four friends as they explore and dwell in the volcanic landscape of prehistory in a place called Green Meadow. Designed to help children navigate the world of friendship and making friends, the stories fostered positive behaviors such as caring about oneself and others, tolerance, ecology, problem-solving and teamwork.

The second season introduced a weekly segment called "Factasaurus" that taught lessons and fun facts, educating children about different dinosaur species.

== Characters ==
Main characters
| Name | Voice | Description |
|---|---|---|
| Dink | R. J. Williams | Kind, brave, smart and has a strong bond with his friends. Dink is a Brontosaurus, similar to Littlefoot from The Land Before Time franchise. |
| Amber | Anndi McAfee | Amber is a close friend of Dink's. She is like a big-sister figure. |
| Scat | Frank Welker | Scat tends to be paranoid, but has a humongous appetite and speaks in the third person. Sometimes his appetite gets him in trouble, especially when it involves his favorite food, called honey fruit. |
| Shyler | Ben Ryan Ganger | Shyler is Dink's shy friend, who has a speech impediment and looks up to Dink and Amber as older siblings. |
| Flapper | S. Scott Bullock | Flapper tends to be a braggart and a jokester, and he speaks with a slight lisp. He constantly tries to land in water, but always fails. Dink calls him Flap. |
| Crusty | Frank Welker | Crusty is a turtle who mentors the dinosaur youngsters and tells them stories that often help teach them valuable lessons. |
Allies
| Name | Voice | Description |
| Ariel | Jennifer Darling | Exceptionally courageous and self-sacrificing, Ariel lives at the Lake of Mists and is viewed by other dinosaurs as an almost supernatural figure. |
| Uncle Longbeak | Hamilton Camp | Longbeak is Flapper's uncle, whom he talks about a lot. |
| Pearl | Debi Derryberry | Pearl is a female friend of Shyler's. |
| Scratcher | Dick Beals | Scratcher is a herbivore by his own choice. |
| Red | Hal Rayle | Red is sometimes called Thundermaker. He is actually a spirit who lived in the Cave of Spirits. |
| Earthshaker | Frank Welker | Shakes the ground when he walks and talks. None too fond of smaller creatures, but willing to return a favor. |
| Dippo | Dana Hill | Dippo is afraid of what other dinosaurs think of his kind. He is good friends with Shyler. |
| Opo | | Opo is a friend of the gang's who helps Ariel to escape from Tyrannor. |
| Dim | | Dim is a dimwitted friend of the gang's. |
| Tubble and Hubble | Tubble: Jim Cummings; Hubble: Jack Angel | Tubble and Hubble are an old pair of pathfinders for their herd. |
| Squirt | Russi Taylor | Once thought Crusty was his mother. |
| Shortspike | | Shortspike is a friend of Dink and separated from his parents due to volcano trouble. |
| Cornelius | | Cornelius was once a rival of Dink's. |
| Trail Blazer | Neil Ross | Trail Blazer used his tail to create Green Meadow and Tarpit Pass (which protects Green Meadow from Hunters like Tyrannor). |
| Patch and Bright Tail | | Patch and Bright Tail are Trail Blazer's children. |
| Strongfoot | | Strongfoot was once Trail Blazer's rival. |
| Tiny | Joey Camen | Tiny is a friend in need, helped by Dink to get fruit guarded by a bullish Dicraeosaurus. |
| Brighteyes | Jodi Carlisle | Brighteyes is a mother whose eggs the gang helped to protect from Egghunters. |
| Buttercup | Billie Hayes | Buttercup is Crusty's childhood turtle friend. |
| Beast | Michael Bell | Beast has a disfigured body structure. |
| Iggy | | Shyler helps Iggy find his way home. |
| Nobbie | | Nobbie is a good friend of Shyler's. |
| Daisy | | Scar once had a crush on her. |
| Brusier | | Brusier is Daisy's boyfriend. |
| Glowy | | Shyler wanted to keep Glowy. |
| Melodi | Kath Soucie | Gang helps Melodi in saving her mate. |
| Forest | Cam Clarke | Forest once made Dink jealous. |
| Stormfoot | Dana Hill | Stormfoot fought Dink in the "Challenge of the Desert" duel. |
| Jerry | Kath Soucie | Tail gets stuck under a rock but is rescued by Crusty. |
| Mama Triceratops | | Once thought Scat was her son. |
Villains
| Name | Voice | Description |
| Tyrannor | | A Tyrannosaurus who chases Dink and his friends all over their prehistoric world. He is feared by every known dinosaur. |
| Hunters | | Various carnivorous dinosaurs that mostly reside in Hunter's Grove. |
| Scavenger | Frank Welker | A troublesome flock of Pterodactylus. |
| Fleetfoot | Jim Cummings | Hunts Pterosaurs. |
| Honeyfruit Monster | | |
| Sharptooth | | According to Crusty, he would even scare Tyrannor. He had fought Trail Blazer with the resulting fight creating Green Meadow and Tarpit Pass. |
| Snakenecks | | |
| Sandtooth | | |
| Watertooth | | |
| Shelleater | | Known to prey on turtles. |
| Bolderbuns | Frank Welker | |
| Waterhunters | | |
| Egghunters | | A trio that targets Brighteyes' eggs. |
| Sharpmouth | | |
| Slidetooth | | |

== Episodes ==
=== Season 1 (1989) ===
| No. | Title | Written by | Original release date |
|---|---|---|---|
| 1a | "The Shell Game" | Karen Wilson & Chris Weber | September 16, 1989 |
Scat's appetite gets him and his friends in trouble when Tyrannor gets Crusty's shell in his jaws.
| 1b | "Shyler's Friend" | Michael Chain | September 16, 1989 |
Shyler is unsure of how to approach and befriend Pearl and his friends' assistance isn't helping.
| 2a | "Dink, Come Home" | Cliff Ruby & Elana Lesser | September 23, 1989 |
Dink and Flapper must find a way back home after getting lost during a Hide-and-seek game gone awry.
| 2b | "White Beauty" | Ralph Sanchez | September 23, 1989 |
A rare albino Parasaurolophus named Aria saves Amber from Tyrannor, but gets injured in the process. The gang returns the favor by helping her get home safe.
| 3a | "Crusty's Baby" | Ted Field | September 30, 1989 |
Crusty becomes the unwitting parent of a newly hatched Stegosaurus and names him Squirt, but the latter doesn't eat well, forcing Crusty to unite him with his actual mother.
| 3b | "The Gentle Hunter" | Buzz Dixon | September 30, 1989 |
Scat meets a plant-eating Deinonychus named Scratcher, who gets driven away by the Styracosaurus herd, so Dink has to save Scat from becoming the hunted; especially when an Albertosaurus gets involved.
| 4a | "Phantom of the Cave" | Gary Greenfield | October 7, 1989 |
Dink and his friends explore the Cave of Spirits to find out more about the Brachiosauruses. They find one named Red who is having trouble with a pack of scavenging Velociraptors.
| 4b | "Dry River" | Michael Chain | October 7, 1989 |
A fall has dammed up the river and the Ultrasaurus, Earthshaker, is not willing to unblock it until after Dink and his friends extract a thorn from his foot.
| 5a | "Tricera-Scat" | Meg McLaughlin | October 14, 1989 |
Scat dozing inside an eggshell is mistaken by a mother Triceratops for one of her hatched babies.
| 5b | "The Search" | Janis Diamond | October 14, 1989 |
Flapper does impractical pranks on some various dinosaurs of the era, but puts a stop when Shyler is in need of rescuing him.
| 6a | "Amber's Crusade" | Meg McLaughlin | October 21, 1989 |
Marooned on a beach, Amber and Shyler have to look for three baby Psittacosaurus. After a close call from Tyrannor, they make it soon afterwards.
| 6b | "Old Timers" | Ralph Sanchez | October 21, 1989 |
Dink, Amber and Shyler head to The Big Claw Race while helping a pair of lost elderly pathfinders find the ocean.
| 7a | "Uncle Longbeak" | Karen Wilson & Chris Weber | October 28, 1989 |
The gang visit Flapper's uncle Longbeak.
| 7b | "Surprise!" | Cliff Ruby & Elana Lesser | October 28, 1989 |
Dink goes to get a stone for Amber's Hatching Day. With aid from Tiny and two Ichthyosaurus, he finds it in a nearby store.
| 8a | "The Hollow Tree" | Ralph Sanchez | November 4, 1989 |
Dink investigates a mysterious inhabitant of a hollow tree. It turns out to be a Diplocaulus named Dippo whose looks are ridiculed, but Flapper rescues him and Shyler from a storm.
| 8b | "Badge of Courage" | Cliff Ruby & Elana Lesser | November 4, 1989 |
During a hike to Fire Mountain, Dink meets Shortspike and goes with a Fire Bug to rescue his father.
| 9a | "Wish Mountain" | Bob Carrau | November 11, 1989 |
Shyler's attempt to make a wish with his loose tooth is interrupted by an Oviraptor and a Euoplocephalus.
| 9b | "Crusty's New Home" | Ted Field | November 11, 1989 |
Tired of fixing the cave, Crusty moves elsewhere. Not finding a new home to his liking, he returns to find Dink and his friends have fixed his old home.
| 10a | "Small Stuff" | Michael Reaves & Brynne Stephes | November 18, 1989 |
Two Erythrotheriums destroy Dink and his friends' digging plans to protect their home. Dink compensates them after saving their lives.
| 10b | "Lights Out" | Mark Cassutt | November 18, 1989 |
Amber gets a crystal rock, but when the rock breaks, Flapper has his own tricks against Tyrannor.
| 11a | "Mystery of the Broken Claw" | Gary Greenfield | November 25, 1989 |
Amber is blamed for destroying a watering hole when trying to get a spot there, so she investigates with her friends. They find the real culprit to be a Spinosaurus and manage to thwart its pack's ambush at another watering hole and restore the usual watering hole.
| 11b | "Encounter at Flatrock" | Ralph Sanchez | November 25, 1989 |
Crusty gets lost while trying to find the Rock. Having failed to join him, Dink goes off to save him from a turtle-eating Segnosaurus.
| 12a | "The Sky Is Falling at Green Meadow" | Ted Field | December 2, 1989 |
Dink and his friends experience snow for the first time.
| 12b | "Sea Rescue" | Ralph Sanchez | December 2, 1989 |
Scat is lost from a tsunami. Dink and his friends, accompanied by two Plesiosauruses, locate and rescue Scat from a storm.
| 13a | "Raiders of the Lost Nest" | Cliff Ruby & Elana Lesser | December 9, 1989 |
Dink, Amber and Shyler help lead a pack of egg thieves away from the nest of a new mother.
| 13b | "Land of No Return" | Larry Huber | December 9, 1989 |
Dink and his friends lure Tyrannor into the 'Land of No Return'. Flapper comes to the rescue, but then, they rescue Tyrannor himself.

=== Season 2 (1990) ===
| No. | Title | Written by | Original release date |
|---|---|---|---|
| 14a | "Scavengers" | Ralph Sanchez | September 15, 1990 |
The kids save an Ornitholestes named Fleetfoot from a flock of Pterodactylus, but Fleetfoot turns out to be a hunter of flying animals and tries to get Flapper.
| 14b | "Tar Troubles" | Larry Huber | September 15, 1990 |
Against Crusty's advice, Dink interferes with a tar pit and frantically tries to stop it spreading but ends up starting a fire.
| 15a | "The Honeyfruit Hero" | Cathyrn Perdue | September 22, 1990 |
Scat tries to become a superhero by saving the Compsognathus Honeyfruit supply from a "Honeyfruit Monster", which turns out to be an Iguanodon, instead of bugs.
| 15b | "Tall Tale" | Richard Merwin | September 22, 1990 |
Crusty tells the story of Trail Blazer, he tells him about he and his herd's survival, the battle against the Allosaurus, Sharptooth and the formation of Green Meadow many years ago.
| 16a | "Crusty's Reunion" | Larry Huber | September 29, 1990 |
Dink and his friends reunite Crusty with his childhood friend, Buttercup.
| 16b | "Tale of the Beast" | Cathyrn Perdue | September 29, 1990 |
A disfigured Saurolophus is believed to be a menacing beast. Amber, whom Beast rescued, is able to clear the misunderstanding.
| 17a | "Scat-ter Brained" | Meg McLaughlin | October 6, 1990 |
A close encounter with Tyrannor and a bump on the head, convinces Scat that he is a Tyrannosaurus. Meeting Tyrannor again during a fall restores Scat.
| 17b | "Fraidy Scat" | Tony Marino | October 6, 1990 |
Scat's fear of animals (possibly monsters, snakes, lizards, spiders, ghost stories or ants) makes him sleepy in the daytime. He overcomes his fear to rescue his friends stuck under a hidden tree.
| 18a | "The Reluctant Head-Banger" | Don Glut | October 13, 1990 |
Shyler befriends a Pachycephalosaurus named Nobby, but his appetite is too big for Dink's lot to handle. However, Nobby rescues them from being buried under the fall.
| 18b | "Wrongs of Spring" | Cathyrn Perdue | October 13, 1990 |
Scat falls in love with a female Apatosaurus.
| 19a | "Overrun" | Michael Reaves & Brynne Stephens | October 20, 1990 |
Green Meadow is overrun with rats.
| 19b | "The Last of Their Kind" | Cathyrn Perdue & Richard Merwin | October 20, 1990 |
Shyler catches a Fire Bug he calls Glowy. A distressed Supersaurus named Melodi is looking for her mate. Shyler and his friends find and rescue Melodi's mate.
| 20a | "Day of the Snake" | Michael Reaves & Brynne Stephens | October 27, 1990 |
Dink and his friends suspect foul play when they come across an abandoned turtle nest with cold eggs in it. When they find the parents in captivity, they must find a way to free them from their captor - a giant snake.
| 20b | "Rivals" | Cathyrn Perdue | October 27, 1990 |
The kids make a new friend named Forest, whose superior abilities make Dink feel like he's outgrown his usefulness to the group.
| 21a | "Challenge" | Ralph Sanchez | November 3, 1990 |
The kids challenge a herd of Centrosaurus when they drink from their water hole somewhere in the desert. Dink must fight the herd leader's son, Stormfoot in a "Challenge of Desert".
| 21b | "The Secret" | Richard Merwin | November 3, 1990 |
Shyler tries to impress his ladyfriend by pretending to be the group's leader. Dink plays along to support Shyler, but the truth eventually comes out.

== Main cast ==
- R. J. Williams as Dink
- Anndi McAfee as Amber
- Ben Ryan Ganger as Shyler
- Frank Welker as Scat and Crusty
- S. Scott Bullock as Flapper

=== Additional cast ===
- Jack Angel as Hubble
- Richard Beals as Scratcher
- Michael Bell as Beast
- Joey Camen as Tiny
- Hamilton Camp as Uncle Longbeak
- Jodi Carlisle as Brighteyes
- Nancy Cartwright as Shortspike
- Cam Clarke as Forest
- Townsend Coleman as Shortspike's father
- Brian Cummings
- Jim Cummings as Tubble and Fleetfoot
- Jennifer Darling as Ariel
- Debi Derryberry as Pearl
- Ron Feinberg
- Billie Hayes as Buttercup
- Whit Hertford
- Dana Hill as Dippo, Stormfoot
- Katie Leigh
- Tress MacNeille
- Kenneth Mars as Narrator
- Pat Musick
- Hal Rayle as Red
- Neil Ross as Trail Blazer
- Steve Schatzberg as Mike
- Kath Soucie as Melodi
- Russi Taylor
- Janet Waldo
- Frank Welker as Earthshaker, Scavenger, Bolderbuns, Tyrannor, Slidetooth

=== Voice director ===
- Ginny McSwain

== Home media ==
=== VHS release ===
Five years after its television broadcast, Dink, the Little Dinosaur was released on VHS by Turner Home Entertainment under the Hanna-Barbera label on September 14, 1994. Its six volumes are Land Of No Return, Shyler's Friend, The Sky Is Falling, Lights Out, Rivals and Phantom Of The Cave. Each Dink videocassette contains over five episodes from the series. Turner also distributed these videos internationally in different countries such as the United Kingdom through First Independent Films, in Australia through Rainbow Products, and in Germany through Fox Video.

=== DVD release ===
Warner Archive released the complete series on October 10, 2017 in Region 1.
