= Broken Roads (video game) =

2024 video game

- Steam header art
- Developer: Drop Bear Bytes
- Publisher: Versus Evil
- Director: Craig Ritchie
- Producers: Robert Barry; Jessica Moore; John Nejday; Olivia Unwin
- Designers: Luke Dorman; Jack Wilson
- Artist: Bianca Roux
- Writer: Leanne Taylor-Giles
- Composer: Tim Sunderland
- Engine: Unity
- Platforms: Windows, Xbox One, Xbox Series X/S, Nintendo Switch, PlayStation 4, PlayStation 5
- Release: April 10, 2024
- Genre: Role-playing
- Mode: Single-player

Broken Roads is a 2024 video game by independent developer Drop Bear Bytes and published by Versus Evil. Described as a post-apocalyptic computer role-playing game, Broken Roads is set in the Wheatbelt region of Western Australia. The game has been compared to non-traditional dialogue-based role-playing games, such as Disco Elysium, in featuring a mechanic described the 'Moral Compass', that responds to moral choices made by the player. The game was released on April 10, 2024, for Windows, PlayStation 4 and 5, Xbox One, and Xbox Series X/S.

Upon release, Broken Roads received mixed reviews from critics.

Drop Bear Bytes went into Administration in February 2025 owing millions of dollars to its creditors. Broken Roads was a commercial failure.

== Gameplay ==
Broken Roads is a role-playing game in which players accompany a party of up to five characters and participate in a "blend of turn-based tactical combat (and) traditional and original" role-playing mechanics. The game features a 'Moral Compass' system in which player actions, including choices made in dialogue and quests, are represented on a map between four quadrants, 'utilitarian', 'humanist', 'machiavellian' and 'nihilist' positions. The player's position on the Moral Compass provides the player with traits affecting gameplay mechanics. The player's companions and key characters feature their own compass, which affects their reaction to the player's statements and choices.

== Development ==
Broken Roads was developed by Drop Bear Bytes, an independent Australian developer based in Torquay founded by director Craig Ritchie in 2019. Development began in January 2019, with a reveal trailer released to the public in October of that year. Broken Roads received support from several Australian state government arts programs, including funding from the Victorian Government's Assigned Production Investment Games program in 2020 and 2021, and from the Queensland Government's Digital Games Incentive in August 2022. A demo of the game was released on Steam in June 2023. In December 2023, Versus Evil, the project's publisher, became defunct.

The Australian setting and identity became a major component of the design of Broken Roads over time. Originally conceived to take place within a generic setting, Ritchie found Australia's "conflicted culture", including its legacies of colonialism and genocide, provided an effective balance between "humor, fun and levity" with "serious, adult themes (and) tough questions". During development, the scope of the game was narrowed from across the Australian continent to a setting in the Wheatbelt region of Western Australia. The developers visited the region several times during pre-production to capture reference images to depict several of the area's landmarks and landscapes in-game.

The development team engaged the input of Indigenous elders to capture the "respectful and authentic" representation of Indigenous Australians in the setting of the game. In 2019, Drop Bear Bytes hired Yorta Yorta and Ngarrindjeri writer Cienan Muir as a 'narrative consultant' for the game. Cienan stated that his role was to provide a "critical eye" in and provide a chance to "get creative and let (his) own stories have some influence" in the game's narrative. In 2022, Karla Hart was brought on board to write a significant portion of the game. Australian stage and screen actor Uncle Jack Charles was originally cast as a narrator in the game, featuring in a release trailer, but died in September 2022 before his participation in the game could be finalised.

The game was strongly influenced by earlier non-traditional role-playing games with an emphasis on dialogue. Narrative lead Leanne Taylor-Giles stated that, like in Fallout, the game was designed to provide players with "all kinds of different ways to approach each problem", including pacifistic approaches with dialogue. Drop Bear Bytes enlisted several industry veterans, including creative lead Colin McComb, who had worked on Fallout 2 and Planescape: Torment, cited by Ritchie as "big influences" on Broken Roads, and Leanne Taylor-Giles, who had worked with McComb on Torment: Tides of Numenera. Pre-release reception of Broken Roads identified similar comparisons, with IGN writing that the game "has the potential to be the next game in the Planescape: Torment lineage of deeply introspective, talky RPGs", and PC Gamer describing the game as having the "potential to become the next Disco Elysium", citing its "philosophical" approach.

== Reception ==
Reception

Aggregate scores
Aggregator	Score
Metacritic	61/100
OpenCritic	33% recommend

Review scores
Publication	Score
Eurogamer	2/5
GamesRadar+	2.5/5
Hardcore Gamer	3.5/5
IGN	4/10
PC Gamer (US)	64%
PCGamesN	4/10
RPGFan	76%
Shacknews	6/10

Broken Roads received "mixed or average" reviews, according to review aggregator Metacritic. Fellow review aggregator OpenCritic assessed that the game received weak approval, being recommended by only 33% of critics. Many critics commended the game's ambition, whilst noting that the execution of its gameplay mechanics fell short of the vision set out by the game's premise.

Critics commended the game's plot and worldbuilding. Describing the game as a "sharply written, intellectual adventure", Rick Lane of PC Gamer stated that the game's settings had an "impressive amount of variety" that were "rich in visual detail and character" and featured "sharply observed characters". Ruth Cassidy of Eurogamer found the game to feel "lonely and pointless", stating that "companions have nothing to say". Nic Reuben of Rock Paper Shotgun considered the game to feature "good prose" and "creative details", commending the game as "brimming with character" and exploring "genuinely thoughtful themes" relating to Australia's history, colonialism, Indigenous and working class cultures.

The execution of the game's moral compass received a mixed reception. Rick Lane of PC Gamer found the varied responses of characters and situations to the mechanic to be where the game was at its "most fun", but qualified that the premise could be "indulgent" and was "somewhat lost" amidst the other aspects of the game. Nic Reuben of Rock Paper Shotgun critiqued the game's moral choice system and its reliance on philosophical labels, expressing it as a "dry" approach that contrasted with presenting dilemmas through "personal experience and imagination".

Many critics also encountered bugs that considerably affected the gameplay. Ruth Cassidy of Eurogamer wrote that the game's quest progression bugs were "real issue" locking them from exploring the gameplay, also citing issues with dialogue and interacting with objects. Describing the game as "broken", Rick Lane of PC Gamer encountered numerous issues with quests, collision issues making it "difficult and sometimes impossible to select targets".
