= Lil' Guardsman =

2024 video game

- Developer: Hilltop Studios
- Publishers: Versus Evil, TinyBuild
- Platforms: Windows macOS; PlayStation 4 PlayStation 5 Nintendo Switch; Xbox One; Xbox Series X/S
- Release: January 23, 2024
- Genre: Puzzle
- Mode: Single-player

Lil' Guardsman is a puzzle video game developed by Hilltop Studios and published by Versus Evil and TinyBuild. The game was released on January 23, 2024; it is one of the last video games published by Versus Evil after their dissolution in 2023.

In Lil' Guardsman, the player takes the role of Lil, a 12-year-old girl who must do her father's duties as a guardsman. Players must decide to admit, deny, or (later) arrest different characters, and the player's choices have an impact on the story.

== Gameplay ==
In Lil' Guardsman, the player takes the role of Lil (short for Lilith), a 12-year-old girl who must do her father's duties as a guardsman for the fantasy kingdom of the Sprawl. Players must decide to admit, deny, or (later) arrest different characters, and the player's choices have an impact on the story. Lil has three action points for each character who wishes to enter the Sprawl. Each action point can be spent on interrogation, calling one of the three royal advisors for their opinion, or on one of five tools available. The tools also require power crystals to operate, and they can only hold a limited amount. However upgrades can be purchased to provide the tools with more uses. Players can also retry any interaction, but they only retry a limited number of times.

The player can also travel to other parts of the Sprawl between shifts, allowing players to see the results of their decisions and occasionally making them do something which impacts the story.

== Plot ==
The game starts with Lil's father Hamish, who is a guardsman in the Sprawl, making Lil fill in for him at the guard shed so he can make a bet on a goblinball game. Lil is reluctant to take her father's job because she is still a kid. What she thinks is a one-time event becomes routine because she proves to be very good at the job. Lil also becomes a test subject for a time machine called the Chronometer3000, which helps as it allows her to go back in time to retry any interaction.

== Development ==
Lil' Guardsman was developed by Hilltop Studios, and was supposed to be published by Versus Evil. When Versus Evil shut down in December 2023, the game was moved to the parent company, TinyBuild.

== Reception ==
Reception

Aggregate scores
Aggregator	Score
Metacritic	PC: 81/100; Switch: 84/100; Xbox Series X: 86/100
OpenCritic	84/100

Review scores
Publication	Score
Hardcore Gamer	4.5/5
Nintendo Life	8/10
RPGFan	90/100

Lil' Guardsman has a rating of 84/100 on Metacritic for the Switch version, 81/100 for the PC version, and 86/100 for the Xbox Series X version. It also a rating of 84/100 on OpenCritic, with 93% of critics recommending it as of February 29, 2024.

=== Awards ===
The game was nominated for "Debut Game" at the Indie Game Awards.
