= S. Scott Bullock =

American actor

- Born: Stuart Scott Bullock
- Other names: Scott Bullock; S. Bullock; Stuart Bullock
- Occupation: Voice actor
- Years active: 1984–present
- Website: www.sbvtalent.com/talent/s-scott-bullock

Stuart Scott Bullock is an American voice actor best known for voicing Hades in Kid Icarus: Uprising, Eddy in Barnyard and its spin-off television show series Back at the Barnyard (2007–2011), and various characters in Danny Phantom (2004–2007), The Marvelous Misadventures of Flapjack (2008–2010), and My Life as a Teenage Robot (2003–2009).

== Career ==
Bullock is known for providing voices for characters, such as Glow Worm in The Ant Bully, King Goobot in The Adventures of Jimmy Neutron: Boy Genius (replacing Patrick Stewart), Thunder in Teen Titans, Captain Bones and Lens McCracken in Crashbox, Lamont in Gargoyles, Flappy Bob from The Fairly Odd-Parents: School's Out!, and Primarch Galenth Dysley / Barthandelus in Final Fantasy XIII.

He also supplied the voice of Mr. Elliot in Invader Zim, Dash Baxter in Danny Phantom, Jean-Phillippe in My Life as a Teenage Robot, Argos Bleak in The New Adventures of Captain Planet, Flapper in Dink, the Little Dinosaur, and Dr. Damage and Emperor Bog in Butt-Ugly Martians. Bullock also appeared on camera in films and shows, such as Defending Your Life as Daniel's father and Murder, She Wrote as a taxi driver.

== Filmography ==
=== Film ===
Year	Title	Role	Notes
1991	Defending Your Life	Daniel's father	
1995	The Pebble and the Penguin	Chubby, Gentoo (voice)	
2006	The Ant Bully	Glow Worm, Wasp Survivor (voice)	
2006	Barnyard	Eddy (voice)	
2007	Disney Princess Enchanted Tales: Follow Your Dreams	Arguing Neighbor #2 (voice)	Segment: "Keys to the Kingdom"
2009	Afro Samurai: Resurrection	Professor Dharman, Kidnapper (voice)	
2010	A Turtle's Tale: Sammy's Adventures	Large Seal (voice)	

=== Television ===
Year	Title	Role	Notes
1989–1990	Dink, the Little Dinosaur	Flapper (voice)	Main cast
1990–1991	Attack of the Killer Tomatoes	F.T. (voice)	Main cast
1990–1991	Zazoo U	Slogo Bonito, Logan Bonito (voice)	Main cast
1990	TaleSpin	Ignatz (voice)	Episode: "Polly Wants a Treasure"
1990–1994	Captain Planet and the Planeteers	Argos Bleak (voice)	15 episodes
1991	Darkwing Duck	Tom Lockjaw, various voices (voice)	10 episodes
1992	Goof Troop	Pharaoh Gang Member, Tooth (voice)	2 episodes
1993–1993	Bonkers	Skunky Skunk, Mr. Big, Toon Pencil (voice)	3 episodes
1994	Aaahh!!! Real Monsters	Steve's Pimple (voice)	Episode: "Krumm's Pimple"
1995–1999	Timon & Pumbaa	Various voices (voice)	6 episodes
1996	Quack Pack	Doug Slackwell, Chuck Homer (voice)	2 episodes
1996	Gargoyles	Lamont (voice)	Episode: "Broadway Goes to Hollywood"
1996	Mighty Ducks: The Animated Series	Tai Quack Do, Weazel (voice)	2 episodes
1998–1999	Oh Yeah! Cartoons	Various voices (voice)	5 episodes
1998–1999	The Wild Thornberrys	Python, Forest Pig, Snaga (voice)	3 episodes
1999–2000	Crashbox	Captain Bones, Lens McCracken, Isaac Newton, Julius Caesar, George Washington, Leonardo da Vinci (voice)	Main cast
1999–2001	Mike, Lu & Og	Wendell, Baggis Cuzzlewit (voice)	Recurring cast
2001	Constant Payne	Skyjacker, Airsailor (voice)	Television pilot
2001	Butt-Ugly Martians	Emperor Bog, Dr. Damage, various voices (voice)	Main cast (26 episodes)
2001–2003	Invader Zim	Mr. Elliot, additional voices (voice)	2 episodes
2001–2003	As Told by Ginger	Dr. Randall, Narrator (voice)	2 episodes
2001–2002	Time Squad	Various voices (voice)	3 episodes
2002	Frankenthumb	Dr. Frankenthumb, Mayor, Minister (voice)	
2002	Jason and the Heroes of Mount Olympus	Mercury, Mars (voice)	Main cast
2002	The Zeta Project	Captain (voice)	Episode: "Resume Mission"
2002–2005	The Adventures of Jimmy Neutron, Boy Genius	King Goobot V (voice)	3 episodes
2003	Teen Titans	Thunder (voice)	Episode: "Forces of Nature"
2003	Rugrats	Greeter, Salon Guy, Pirates (voice)	Episode: "Club Fred"
2003	The Powerpuff Girls	Farmer, Itchy Person (voice)	Episode: "Divide and Conquer"
2003–2004	Duck Dodgers	Various voices (voice)	2 episodes
2003–2005	My Life as a Teenage Robot	Various voices (voice)	2 episodes
2004–2006	Danny Phantom	Dash Baxter, Klemper, Ghost Dog, additional voices (voice)	Recurring cast
2004–2011	The Fairly OddParents	Various voices (voice)	14 episodes
2005	All Grown Up!	Pool Manager, Worker, Scary Voice (voice)	Episode: "The Curse of Reptar"
2005	The Life and Times of Juniper Lee	Various voices (voice)	12 episodes
2005	The Buzz on Maggie	Additional voices (voice)	Episode: "The Price of Fame"
2005	Stroker & Hoop	Hoop's Mom, Rose Schwartz, additional voices (voice)	4 episodes
2005	Super Robot Monkey Team Hyperforce Go!	VX-808 Probe Brain (voice)	Episode: "A Ghost in the Machinder"
2006	Shaggy & Scooby-Doo Get a Clue!	Chef Francoise, Kevin, Infomercial Guy (voice)	3 episodes
2006	Biker Mice from Mars	Flare (voice)	Episode: "Biker Mice Down Under"
2007	Afro Samurai	Dharman (voice)	2 episodes
2007–2008	The Emperor's New School	Additional voices (voice)	5 episodes
2007–2008	Tak and the Power of Juju	Psychic Juju (voice)	5 episodes
2008–2011	Back at the Barnyard	Eddy, additional voices (voice)	6 episodes
2008–2010	The Marvelous Misadventures of Flapjack	Various voices (voice)	30 episodes
2009	Random! Cartoons	Various voices (voice)	3 episodes
2010	Regular Show	Various voices (voice)	2 episodes
2011	Mike & Molly	TV Announcer #1	Episode: "Joyce & Vince and Peaches & Herb"
2011	Soul Quest Overdrive	Injured Man (voice)	Episode: "Pilot"
2011–2012	Phineas and Ferb	Additional voices	4 episodes
2011	The Super Hero Squad Show	Red King (voice)	Episode: "Planet Hulk! (Six Against Infinity, Part 5)"
2012	Fish Hooks	Ice Pick (voice)	Episode: "Guys' Night Out"
2013	The Legend of Korra	Two Toed Ping (voice)	Episode: "The Sting"
2014–2016	Breadwinners	T-Midi, Salvation Army Duck (voice)	Recurring role (24 episodes)
2016	Clarence	Pete, Xavius, Terry Coogan, additional voices (voice)	4 episodes
2017–2018	The Powerpuff Girls	Additional voices (voice)	2 episodes

=== Video games ===
Year	Title	Role	Notes
1995	Full Throttle	Grand Marnier	
1996	Leisure Suit Larry: Love for Sail!	Peter, Dick, Wang	
1997	The Curse of Monkey Island	Lemonhead, Pirate #2	
1998	King's Quest: Mask of Eternity	Connor, King Mudge	
2000	Buzz Lightyear of Star Command	Warp Darkmatter	
2000	Escape from Monkey Island	Otis	
2003	Final Fantasy X-2	Logos	
2004	Metal Gear Solid: The Twin Snakes	Genome Soldier	
2004	Ground Control II: Operation Exodus	Centurion Dracus	
2004	The Bard's Tale	Additional voices	
2004	The SpongeBob SquarePants Movie	Additional voices	
2004	Call of Duty: United Offensive	Sergeant Antonov, Sergeant Jones	
2004	EverQuest II	Captain Hastings, additional voices	
2004	A Series of Unfortunate Events	Bald-Headed Man With the Long Nose	
2005	The Punisher	Crack Dealer, Chop Shop Worker	
2005	SWAT 4	Steven "Gramps" Reynolds (Badge #3077)	
2005	The Incredible Hulk: Ultimate Destruction	Vector	
2005	The Suffering: Ties That Bind	Creeper	
2006	God Hand	Mad Midget Five, Psychic Midget, Villains	
2006	The Sopranos: Road to Respect	Additional voices	
2007	World in Conflict	Additional voices	
2007	Neverwinter Nights 2: Mask of the Betrayer	Myrkul, One of Many (God), Master Geb	
2007	SpongeBob's Atlantis SquarePantis	Additional voices	
2007	Mass Effect	Commander Rentola, Ian Newstead	
2008	Destroy All Humans! Big Willy Unleashed	Additional voices	
2008	The Incredible Hulk	Vector, Jupiter Leader, Hulkbuster	
2008	Tak and the Guardians of Gross	Icky Juju	
2008	SpongeBob SquarePants Featuring Nicktoons: Globs of Doom	Ghost Dog, Dash Baxter	
2008	Kung Fu Panda: Legendary Warriors	Rabbit, Rat Boss, Rhino	
2008	Destroy All Humans! Path of the Furon	Vinnie Molinari, Producer	
2009	Afro Samurai	Dharman, Assassin	
2009	MadWorld	President, Yee Fung, Little Eddie	
2009	The Chronicles of Riddick: Assault on Dark Athena	Guards	
2009	The Secret of Monkey Island: Special Edition	Red Skull, Otis	
2009	Cars Race-O-Rama	Bubba	
2009	Final Fantasy XIII	Galenth Dysley	
2010	Valkyria Chronicles II	Jarde	
2011	Final Fantasy XIII-2	Additional voices	
2012	Kid Icarus: Uprising	Hades	
2015	Lego Dimensions	Sloth	

=== Miscellaneous ===
- Barnyard Commandos – Eddy
- Jimmy Neutron's Nicktoon Blast – King Goobot V, Elvis Ooblar
