= Thunder and Lightning (comics) =

Comic book characters

- Thunder (left) and Lightning (right) as depicted in Who's Who: The Definitive Directory of the DC Universe #23 (January 1987).

Publication information
- Publisher: DC Comics
- First appearance: New Teen Titans #32 (1983)
- Created by: Marv Wolfman; George Pérez

In-story information
- Alter ego: Gan and Tavis Williams
- Team affiliations: Teen Titans
- Abilities: Electrokinesis; Psychic link

Thunder and Lightning are a duo of superpowered brothers appearing in media published by DC Comics, primarily in association with the Teen Titans.

The two have made limited appearances in media outside comics, with S. Scott Bullock and Quinton Flynn voicing the characters in Teen Titans (2003).

== Publication history ==
Thunder and Lightning first appeared in New Teen Titans #32 and was created by Marv Wolfman and George Pérez.

== Fictional character biography ==
Gan and Tavis Williams are twin brothers and the sons of an unnamed Vietnamese woman and American soldier Walter Williams. Originally conjoined twins, they were separated with magic. As children, the two manifest superpowers, but are unable to control them and quickly burn themselves out without regular infusions of their father's blood. They take the aliases Thunder and Lightning, respectively, and set off to America to search for their father. The two cause major disturbances in St. Louis and engage in battle against the Teen Titans. After their motives are revealed, the Titans decide to help the pair.

Months later, the Teen Titans and S.T.A.R. Labs are working on a cure for Thunder and Lightning's powers. At the same time, Raven discovers that Walter Williams is an alien and has been captured by H.I.V.E. When the Titans locate Walter, H.I.V.E. controls Walter and forces him to attack Thunder and Lightning, who kill him. S.T.A.R. Labs takes blood from Walter's body and uses it to create a cure that allows Thunder and Lightning to control their powers. Thunder and Lightning relocate to San Francisco and become security guards at S.T.A.R. Labs.

During the Salvation Run storyline, Thunder and Lightning are seen as prisoners on the planet Cygnus 4019. When they give food to Martian Manhunter, he asks why they are on the planet. Thunder and Lightning offer to help Martian Manhunter, but are attacked by Bane. Lex Luthor keeps the two alive and uses them as power sources for his teleporter device. Thunder and Lightning are seemingly killed when the teleporter self-destructs.

In The New 52 continuity reboot, Thunder and Lightning (renamed Alexei and Alya) are reintroduced as members of the Ravagers.

== Powers and abilities ==
Thunder and Lightning are able to control their namesakes and possess a psychic link that allows them to communicate with each other.

== Other versions ==
The original Thunder and Lightning battle Superman. From Superman #303.

An unrelated Thunder and Lightning appear in Superman #303 (September 1976), and were created by Elliot S. Maggin and Curt Swan. They are two separate identities for a shapeshifting android created by the supervillain Whirlicane.

== In other media ==
- Thunder and Lightning appear in Teen Titans, voiced by S. Scott Bullock and Quinton Flynn respectively. This version of the two wear samurai-like armor and initially disregard the safety of others in pursuit of fun. Additionally, they are both capable of flight, with Thunder conjuring a cloud-like platform while Lightning can transmute his lower body into a lightning bolt. Introduced in the episode "Forces of Nature", Thunder and Lightning clash with the Teen Titans, during which Beast Boy convinces Thunder to see the error of his ways. Slade tricks Thunder and Lightning into creating a fire monster to attack Jump City, but Thunder convinces Lightning to reform as well and they create a rain storm to stop the monster. In the fifth season, Thunder and Lightning appear as honorary members of the Teen Titans.
- The Teen Titans animated series incarnations of Thunder and Lightning appear in Teen Titans Go!.
