= Guild of Dungeoneering =

2015 video game

- Developer: Gambrinous
- Publisher: Versus Evil
- Engine: Flixel
- Platforms: Microsoft Windows, OS X
- Release: WW: July 14, 2015
- Genre: Role-playing
- Mode: Single-player

Guild of Dungeoneering is a dungeon crawl role-playing video game developed by Gambrinous and published by Versus Evil. The game was released for Microsoft Windows and OS X on July 14, 2015.

== Gameplay ==
The player must place cards onto the grid to form a dungeon for their character to explore.

Guild of Dungeoneering is a dungeon crawl role-playing video game with turn-based combat and card game mechanics. The player places cards to build the dungeon around the hero.

== Release ==
Guild of Dungeoneering was released for Microsoft Windows and OS X on July 14, 2015.

== Reception ==
Reception

Aggregate score
| Aggregator | Score |
|---|---|
| Metacritic | PC: 72/100 iOS: 88/100 |

Guild of Dungeoneering received average reviews from professional critics upon release. Aggregate review website Metacritic assigned a score of 72/100. IGN awarded it a score of 7.0 out of 10, saying "Guild of Dungeoneering is a fun and interesting approach to turn-based dungeon crawlers."
