= Afro Samurai =

Japanese manga series by Takashi Okazaki

- Volume one of the Afro Samurai manga remake that was first released in America by Tor Books and Seven Seas Entertainment

アフロサムライ (Afuro Samurai)
- Genre: Action, period piece, post-apocalyptic
- Manga

Afro Samurai!
- Written by: Takashi Okazaki
- Published by: Self-funded dōjinshi
- English publisher: NA: Titan Manga
- Magazine: Nou Nou Hau (dōjinshi)
- Original run: November 1998 – September 2002
- Volumes: ^{JP} 1^{NA} 2
- Anime television series
- Directed by: Fuminori Kizaki
- Produced by: Kōji Kajita; Taito Okiura
- Written by: Story: Yasuyuki Mutō; Tomohiro Yamashita; Screenplay: Derek Draper; Chris Yoo
- Music by: RZA
- Studio: Gonzo
- Licensed by: Crunchyroll (Note: In North America through Crunchyroll (formerly known as Funimation), in the United Kingdom through Crunchyroll UK and Ireland (formerly known as Manga Entertainment) and in Australia through Madman Anime.)
- Original network: FNS (Fuji TV), Wowow
- English network: AUS: MTV, ABC2; NA: Spike; UK: Adult Swim, Bravo
- Original run: January 4, 2007 – February 1, 2007
- Episodes: 5
- Anime television film
- Afro Samurai: Resurrection (2009)

Afro Samurai (アフロサムライ, Afuro Samurai; stylized as ΛFΓO SΛMUΓΛI) is a Japanese manga series written and illustrated by Takashi Okazaki. It was originally serialized irregularly in the avant-garde dōjinshi manga magazine Nou Nou Hau from November 1998 to September 2002. Inspired by Okazaki's love of hip hop and soul music, it follows the life of Afro Samurai, whose father and the owner of the No. 1 headband, was killed by a gunslinger and the owner of the No. 2 headband. Afro sets on a journey for revenge.

The Afro Samurai dōjinshi was adapted into an anime miniseries by Gonzo in 2007, along with the television film sequel Afro Samurai: Resurrection in 2009, both of which starred Samuel L. Jackson as the title character. The anime received two Emmy nominations for Outstanding Individual Achievement in Animation and Outstanding Animated Program, which it won. After the release of the anime series, Okazaki remade the original Afro Samurai dōjinshi into a two-volume manga. Tor Books and Seven Seas Entertainment licensed the title and published it under their new Tor/Seven Seas imprint for a North America exclusive release. In addition to the miniseries, Afro Samurai has been adapted into two video games. For the television series and film, two soundtracks by RZA of Wu-Tang Clan and a profile book were released in Japan.

== Plot ==
In a feudal yet futuristic Japan, it is said that the one wearing the Number 1 headband is the greatest warrior in the world and shall possess god-like powers. Some believe it grants immortality while others believe they received headbands from the gods themselves. The only way to obtain the Number 1 headband is to challenge and defeat the current wearer in combat. However, only the wearer of the Number 2 headband can challenge the Number 1 whereas anyone can challenge the Number 2. The Number 2 headband's current owner, the outlaw Justice, fights and kills Rokutaro—owner of the Number 1 headband—in front of his young son Afro. Afro vows revenge against Justice who tells him to seek him out when he is "ready to duel a god."

Years later, Afro wears the Number 2 headband. He kills a group of assassins, criminals, and mercenaries sent by the Empty Seven Clan, for whom they seek the headband. Recalling his tragic past, Afro goes to Mount Shumi to face Jinno, his childhood friend and fellow samurai, who blames him for killing their master (who had the Number 2 headband). He defeats Jinno and tracks down Justice, who explains that there are other headbands in existence, ranging to an unspecified higher number. Claiming that he intends to use his power as the Number 1 to bring peace to all mankind, Justice reveals that he killed all headband bearers and decorated his safe house with corpses. Afro kills Justice and takes the Number 1 headband. Afro settles in as the new Number 1 while Jinno, now claiming all headbands from Justice, returns to take revenge.

In Afro Samurai: Resurrection, Jinno and his sister Sio, steal Rokutaro's body and the Number 1 headband. After killing Shichigoro and taking the Number 2 headband, Afro confronts the resurrected Rokutaro, who kills the siblings. Afro defeats Rokutaro, gives the Number 2 headband to Shichigoro's son Kotaro, and peacefully continues wearing the Number 1. Elsewhere, an unknown man meets the revived Justice.

== Production ==
Okazaki started drawing African-American characters on items like Kleenex boxes when he was a teenager, inspired by his fondness for hip hop and soul music. He also drew ideas from American media and their depiction of Japanese culture. He started combining elements of samurai into his work, eventually developing the design for Afro. Okazaki began writing the original dōjinshi, then called Afro Samurai!, when he and his friends started independently publishing the art magazine Nou Nou Hau. The preparatory "issue 0" of Nou Nou Hau was released in November 1998 with Afro Samurai artwork featured on the cover. Takashi Okazaki wrote the entire manga in the English direction, with elements from English and Japanese comics. He also used Afro Samurai for a cat food advertisement in the last pages of his manga book. In addition to the anime production, Okazaki re-made the dōjinshi, with an increased display of artistic skill. At the Japan Society from March 13 to June 14, 2009, original Afro Samurai dōjinshi artwork (as used on issue 0 of Nou Nou Hau) was showcased at the KRAZY!: The Delirious World of Anime + Manga + Video Games exhibition.

== Media ==
=== Manga ===
The series was originally published in the self-funded Nou Nou Hau dōjinshi magazine. First appearing in issue 0, the dōjinshi version was first published from September 1999 to October 2000. After the release of the anime version, Okazaki recreated the original dōjinshi. Although the recreation of the original manga was created in Japan, it was first published in the United States by Seven Seas Entertainment and Tor Books in two tankōbon volumes. As a special supplement, thumb-nail sized clips of the original dōjinshi were shown at the end of the first volume. The English release of the manga was Tor Books and Seven Seas' first joint publication under the newly formed Tor/Seven Seas imprint. The manga was also released in Italy through Panini Comics' manga publishing division Planet Manga, on April 9, 2009. The manga was released in one volume in Japan on December 18, 2009. The limited edition came with all the issues of the original dōjinshi included in a separate volume. A director's cut of the manga was set to be released on July 26, 2022, with Titan Comics taking over the publishing under their new "Titan Manga" imprint. However, it was delayed to December 13, 2022.

No.	Title	Release date	ISBN
1	Nothing personal, kid.	September 2008	978-0-7653-2123-7
Chapter 1; Chapter 2; Chapter 3; Chapter 4; Chapter 5; Translation Notes; Supplemental Material
After witnessing his father killed by Justice, Afro wears the No. 2 headband and plans to avenge his father's death.
2	Death isn't the end...it's only the beginning.	February 2009	978-0-7653-2239-5
Chapter 6; Chapter 7; Chapter 8; Chapter 9; Chapter 10; Honorifics Guide; Translation Notes; Creator Interview
After killing Justice, Afro takes the No. 1 headband and challenges Jinno.

=== Anime ===
One of Okazaki's friends decided to make action figures based on characters, which were released in small amounts. After they were created, a producer from the anime studio, Gonzo, happened to find them and thought about creating an animated miniseries based on the manga. It took three years to develop, and during that time the studio created a trailer, which happened to catch the attention of Samuel L. Jackson. It was announced that the series would be a five-episode "creative collaboration", between Jackson, Okazaki and Gonzo, and Wu-Tang Clan member RZA served as a music composer. Each episode of the anime cost $1 million.

In 2006, it was announced that Funimation (later Crunchyroll, LLC) acquired the rights to the anime series which would premiere on Spike, later that year, and that Jackson would voice Afro. Afro Samurai debuted on January 4, 2007. The series premiered worldwide on Spike's website, where they streamed the first episode online. On May 3, 2007, the series premiered on Japanese television, in English with Japanese subtitles, and for the first time completely uncut with no Japanese dub.

On May 11, 2007, Funimation released the first Afro Samurai DVDs at Anime Central, at their own booth, the regular Afro Samurai: TV Version and the uncut Afro Samurai: Director's Cut. Both DVDs were released to the public on May 22, 2007. On September 4, 2007, all five episodes of Afro Samurai were released on iTunes. To promote this, Funimation released eight custom designed iPods by Takashi Okazaki. In 2008, Funimation released the Afro Samurai anime series onto Xbox Live in high definition format and also debuted on Blu-ray Disc in that year. The series was shown at the German Film Festival in Germany.

#	Title	Original release date
1	"Revenge" "Number Two"	January 4, 2007
As a boy, Afro witnessed Justice decapitating his father and wears the No. 1 headband. As a man, he wears the No. 2 and sets out on his journey for revenge.
2	"The Dream Reader" "OKIKU"	January 11, 2007
Afro relives his harsh past through his dreams when he is discovered by an old friend, Otsuru (Okiku) at a riverbank who tends to his wounds. In the present day, she attempts to kill Afro, but she makes love with him. The assassins then kill Otsuru.
3	"The Empty Seven Clan" "THE EMPTY SEVEN CLAN"	January 18, 2007
As the Empty Seven Clan continues to put pressure on Afro, he kills them and the Afro Droid.
4	"Duel" "KUMA"	January 25, 2007
Jinnosuke (Kuma) fights with Afro about the consequence lesson of choosing revenge over family and using the No. 2 headband.
5	"Justice" "JUSTICE"	February 1, 2007
Afro goes to Justice's lair and duels him. After killing Justice and claiming the No. 1 headband, Afro reconciles and battles with Jinno.

=== Films ===
In an Associated Press interview in 2007, Okazaki confirmed there would be a sequel to the anime series, and that it would air on Spike. In 2008, the sequel was announced to be a television film, Afro Samurai: Resurrection, with Lucy Liu and Mark Hamill joining the cast. Hip hop artist The RZA returned to provide the soundtrack of the film. Afro Samurai: Resurrection debuted on Spike on January 25, 2009. On July 16, 2009, Afro Samurai: Resurrection was nominated for an Emmy in the "Outstanding Animated Program (for programming one hour or more)" category in the 61st Primetime Emmy Awards and the Creative Arts Emmy Awards. At the Emmy awards, Afro Samurai: Resurrection lost to Destination Imagination, a television film based on Foster's Home for Imaginary Friends. The art director of Afro Samurai: Resurrection, Shigemi Ikeda, won an Emmy for his work on Resurrection, which is the first ever awarded for work on a Japanese-animated production. Afro Samurai: Resurrection was the first Japanese anime to be nominated for and win an Emmy. Late 2009 also saw the release of Afro Samurai: Complete Murder Sessions on Blu-ray and DVD. A 4-disc collection of both Afro Samurai Director's Cut and Afro Samurai: Resurrection, together in one complete boxset.

Announced at the 2006 San Diego Comic-Con, a live action version of the series is said to be in the making. On July 21, 2011, Gonzo K.K. announced that Indomina Group had obtained the rights to produce the film, with Samuel L. Jackson, Jasbinder Singh Mann (Indomina Group Vice Chairman and CEO), Shin Ishikawa (Gonzo Studios) as producers; Eli Selden of Anonymous Content as executive producer. Production, however, stalled when Indomina Group suspended North American operations and shut its US office.

=== Video games ===
In 2005, Gonzo had awarded Namco Bandai Games exclusive rights to publish two Afro Samurai video games, as announced that year. The debut trailer of the first game was released at the company's Editor's Day presentation. Afro Samurai was released for the Xbox 360 and PlayStation 3 on January 27, 2009. A sequel, titled Afro Samurai 2: Revenge of Kuma, was released for the PlayStation 4 and Microsoft Windows on September 22, 2015. The game was developed by Redacted Studios and published by Versus Evil. An Xbox One version was planned to be released on October 9, 2015; however, after the negative reception of the game, it was never released. The game was eventually delisted in November 2015, due to the negative reception.

=== Soundtracks ===
Wu-Tang Clan member RZA produced the soundtrack for both the Afro Samurai TV series and the TV movie sequel Afro Samurai: Resurrection. The first soundtrack for the anime series, The RZA Presents: Afro Samurai: The Soundtrack was released on January 30, 2007, by Koch Records (now known as E1 Music). The second soundtrack for the TV movie, The RZA Presents: Afro Samurai: Resurrection: The Soundtrack, was also released by Koch Records on January 27, 2009.

== Voice cast ==
- Samuel L. Jackson - Afro Samurai, Ninja Ninja
- Mark Hamill - Bin, Oden Shop Master
- Lucy Liu - Sio
- Kelly Hu - Okiku / Otsuru
- Ron Perlman - Justice
- Jeff Bennett - Hachiro, Foo
- Steve Blum - Assassin
- S. Scott Bullock - Dharman
- Terrence C. Carson - Sword Master, Brother 4
- Grey DeLisle - Oyuki, Woman
- John DiMaggio - Brother 2, Giant, Patron #2, Ivanov
- Greg Eagles - Rokutaro, Brother 6
- John Kassir - Shosun
- Phil LaMarr - Teenage Afro Samurai, Brother 1, Brother 3, Brother 5, Kuro
- Yuri Lowenthal - Jinno/Kuma
- Jason Marsden - Sasuke
- Liam O'Brien - Kihachi, Patron #4
- Crystal Scales - Young Afro Samurai
- Dwight Schultz - Assassin, Patron #1, Ronin
- Tara Strong - Otsuru, Jiro
- Fred Tatasciore - Juzo, Patron #5, Shuzo
- James Arnold Taylor - Yashichi
- Dave Wittenberg - Assassin, Patron #3, Punk, Matasaburo

== Crew ==
- Samuel L. Jackson - Executive producer
- Jamie Simone - Casting and voice director

== Reception ==
The manga series has received generally positive reviews from critics. Scott Green, writer of the Anime AICN segment of Ain't It Cool News said that the manga "is a work of design" and that it "utilizes the medium to which it is applied as a platform rather than as an ends unto itself." Scott notes that Okazaki does not have a "head for manga as a storytelling form" and that the "manga labors to show off Okazaki's design." Anime News Network reviewer, Carlo Santos stated about the anime that "like most typical action-adventures, the story starts out slow and only picks up toward the middle and end when the blades really start flying" and that "Afro Samurai is hardly a complex story" and that it only has "a handful of characters and a straightforward beat-the-next-guy plotline". Carlo Santos also noted that "the original Afro Samurai manga is pretty lousy" and that Takashi Okazaki often gets lost in "incomprehensible scribbles" and "style over substance." Volume 2 of Afro Samurai also charted 147 on ComiPress' "Top 250 Manga Volumes" of February 2009. The Blu-ray of the anime series charted #16 on VideoScan's Blu-ray charts. In January 2009, IGN ranked the series 90th on a list of the top 100 animated series, saying that the over-the-top violence and quirky story and characters made the show enjoyable.

Writing in the third edition of The Anime Encyclopedia (2015), Jonathan Clements and Helen McCarthy discussed the influence of hip-hop culture on Afro Samurai, describing the series as taking the irreverence of Samurai Champloo to extremes. They praised the art direction, color design and fluid animation, describing the fight scenes as "as ritualized as the bullfight, as fluid as the ballet". They considered both the series and its sequel, Afro Samurai: Resurrection, primarily exercises in audiovisual aesthetics, in which spectacle took precedence over plot, dialogue and character development.

=== China ban ===
On June 12, 2015, the Chinese Ministry of Culture listed Afro Samurai among 38 anime and manga titles banned in China.

== In popular culture ==
Rapper Lupe Fiasco included a song referencing Afro Samurai in his 2024 album Samurai, titled "No. 1 Headband".
