= Antihero (video game) =

Turn-based strategy video game

- Developer: Tim Conkling
- Publisher: Versus Evil
- Platforms: Windows, macOS
- Release: 10 July 2017
- Genre: Turn-based strategy
- Modes: Single-player, multiplayer

Antihero is a turn-based strategy video game developed by Tim Conkling and published by Versus Evil.

== Gameplay ==
Antihero is a Victorian-themed turn-based strategy video game with role-playing and 4X gameplay elements. Players take control of a thieves' guild and carry operations like stealing goods and blackmailing the wealthy. The game features a single-player story campaign and asynchronous multiplayer that enables multiple matches to be played simultaneously.

== Development and release ==
Antihero was developed by Tim Conkling. Development began in 2013. Although Conkling had initially been working on the game alone, he had increased the development team size to four people by September 2014. In 2014, the game was submitted to the community voting initiative, Greenlight, on the digital distribution service Steam. They planned to release an in-development version of the game commercially in 2015, using the early access model. The game was being developed for personal computers (PCs) and mobile devices with the intention of supporting cross-platform play. Windows and macOS versions were planned to launch in early 2016, but they were ultimately released on 10 July 2017, with Versus Evil publishing the game. The mobile version is scheduled to be released in the future.

== Reception ==
Reception

Aggregate score
Aggregator	Score
Metacritic	PC: 81/100 iOS: 85/100

Review score
Publication	Score
TouchArcade	iOS: 4.5/5

Antihero received "generally favourable" reviews from professional critics according to review aggregator website Metacritic.
