= Afro Samurai: Resurrection =

Japanese anime television film

- Japanese film poster
- Based on: Afro Samurai by Takashi Okazaki
- Screenplay by: Yasuyuki Mutō; Josh Fialkov; Eric Calderon
- Story by: Takashi Okazaki; Fuminori Kizaki
- Directed by: Fuminori Kizaki
- Starring: Samuel L. Jackson; Lucy Liu
- Music by: RZA
- Countries of origin: Japan; United States
- Original language: English

Production
- Executive producers: Shinichiro Ishikawa; Leo Chu; Eric Garcia; Arthur Smith; Samuel L. Jackson
- Producers: Hiroshi Kumada; Chris Carlisle; Eric Calderon
- Editor: Kiyoshi Hirose
- Running time: 100 minutes
- Production company: Gonzo
- Budget: $5 million

Original release
- Network: Fuji Television (Japan); Spike TV (United States)
- Release: January 25, 2009

Afro Samurai: Resurrection (アフロサムライ レザレクション, Afuro Samurai Rezarekushon), (stylized as ΛFΓO SΛMUΓΛI RESUΓΓECTIOΠ) is a 2009 English-language Japanese animated television film sequel to the anime series Afro Samurai, starring Samuel L. Jackson and Lucy Liu. It aired on Spike TV on January 25, 2009.

== Plot ==
Lacking any sense of purpose after taking revenge on Justice, the Number 1 headband bearer, Afro Samurai, spends his days making wooden sculptures of historical figures and has not fought a duel in years. Jinno, his adoptive brother who is now an emotionless cyborg, and his sister, Lady Sio, ambush and beat him severely, while stealing the headband and his deceased father Rokutaro's mandible. Sio tells Afro that they will resurrect Rokutaro and use him for vengeance, challenging Afro to find the Number 2 headband if he has the will to fight.

After getting his sword reforged, Afro goes to a gambling house, where the last surviving member of the Empty Seven Clan, Brother 3, challenges him to a dice game for the identity of the Number 2. Afro discovers Brother 3 cheating and forces him to reveal that the Number 2 belonged to the ronin Shichigoro. Afro unknowingly saves Shichigoro's adopted son Kotaro and later kills the latter, leaving Kotaro to swear revenge. Afro claims the Number 2 headband and goes on to destroy three cyborg warriors, who turn out to be Sio's foster brothers and sister. Sio uses forbidden science to resurrect Rokutaro, turning him into a soulless warrior.

With Afro injured by his previous fight, Rokutaro mortally wounds his son, choking him until he falls unconscious. The sight of Afro dying causes Jinno to remember the bond they once shared as brothers, and he attacks Rokutaro, who mutilates his body. Sio tries to save her brother, but Rokutaro impales her through Jinno's body. After they die, a spark from Jinno's body travels through Sio's spilled blood and revives Afro. He accepts that Rokutaro is not his real father and kills him. Afro retrieves the Number 1 headband and gives the Number 2 to Kotaro, telling him that he will be ready for when he wants to avenge Shichigoro. While Afro travels to Mount Shumi and searches for a challenger as the Number 1, his imaginary companion Ninja Ninja reappears before him, stating about the endless cycle of revenge and bloodshed.

=== Difference between versions ===
The ending differs between the DVD and television broadcast editions of the film. In the series, Afro reclaims the headband and runs into a masked man as the image of Justice appears for a split second. In the Director's Cut DVD edition, Afro reclaims the Number 1 headband. After the credits, Justice reappears.

== Voice cast ==
- Samuel L. Jackson – Afro / Ninja-Ninja
  - Phil LaMarr – Teen Afro
- Lucy Liu – Lady Sio
  - Ariel Winter – Young Sio
- Yuri Lowenthal – Jinnosuke (Kuma)
- Mark Hamill – Bin
- Jeff Bennett – Brother 3
- S. Scott Bullock – Professor Dharman
- Grey DeLisle – Tomoe
- Greg Eagles – Rokutaro
- Zachary Gordon – Kotaro
- Liam O'Brien – Shichigoro
- RZA – DJ
- Kevin Michael Richardson – Takimoto

== Releases ==
The film aired on Spike TV on January 25, 2009. It was released on DVD on February 3, 2009, and on PlayStation Store in May 2009. The film premiered at the San Diego Asian Film Festival in October 16, 2009. It aired for Funimation's YouTube stream, from July 31 to August 5, 2011. For the United Kingdom release on Netflix, the film was among one the initial titles for the January 2012 launch.

== Reception ==
Zac Bertschy of Anime News Network stated about Afro Samurai: Resurrection that "it's a gorgeous film," with "incredible animation, spectacular action setpieces [sic] and a thumping score by Ghostface". Zac noted that the plot is just "window dressing" and that if it's about anything it's about "cool". Zac criticized that the film as just an excuse to string fight scenes together and that the farther it goes on it becomes clearer how "weak the writing is".

Hyper commends the anime for its art, saying, "stylised poses and sharp, dynamic visuals have long been a trademark element of this series, and they hold true [in the anime]." For the Primetime Emmy Award for Outstanding Animated Program, the film lost to American Foster's Home for Imaginary Friends. Though film's art director, Shigemi Ikeda, won a Primetime Emmy award for "Outstanding Individual Achievement In Animation".
