= Nou Nou Hau =

Japanese manga anthology

- Preparatory issue zero of Nou Nou Hau featuring Afro Samurai on the cover.
- Categories: manga, dōjinshi, avant-garde, indie
- Frequency: Random
- Circulation: 100 (2006)
- First issue: November 1998
- Final issue Number: September 2002; 6
- Country: Japan
- Language: Japanese
- Website: kugel-blitz.com

Nou Nou Hau (ノウノウハウ; lit. 'No, Know How'), stylized NOU NOU HAU, abbreviated NNH, was an avant-garde dōjinshi manga anthology first published in November 1998. The magazine serialized the manga series Afro Samurai.

== History ==
Manga artist Takashi Okazaki started drawing African-American characters on Kleenex boxes when he was younger, inspired by his fondness of hip hop music and culture. Takashi Okazaki threw in some elements of samurai into his work, eventually developing Afro Samurai. Takashi Okazaki started writing the series when, he and his other artistic friends created the magazine Nou Nou Hau. The magazine debuted in November 1998 with a preparatory "issue 0", featuring Afro Samurai on the cover. The lineup of the first issue consisted of Takashi Okazaki, and his friends Dai Okazaki, Ryoji Shibasaki and Mai Shibasaki. The official first issue of Nou Nou Hau was published in January 1999 and manga artists Motonobu Hattori and Hiroyuki Hiwatashi began to contribute to the magazine. By the second issue, the binding was changed and contributors of the magazine were asking bookstores to put the magazine on sale, making the magazine's readership increase. Dai Okazaki (now going by the name "Smelly") was asked to be on the Japanese show Takashi no Dare Demo Picasso (たけしの誰でもピカソ), which made him famous in the later years. The fourth issue of Nou Nou Hau was released right when "Smelly" became a star on Takashi no Dare Demo Picasso, which increased the sales of the magazine. The artist Imaitoonz also started to contribute. By issue four, in October 1999, puppet animator Kaori Kuniyasu joined the magazine and for the first time began making a manga. In 2002, German artists named Moga Mobo, who liked the works of Nou Nou Hau, asked the artists if they could collaborate. The collaborative effort was included in the September 2002, issue six of Nou Nou Hau. In September 2002, Nou Nou Hau opened an exhibition called "Show Yavay!!!" in Berlin, with advertising by Moga Mobo. Nou Nou Hau was brought to a close when the artists could no longer afford the printing costs.

== Features ==
The magazine ran many manga series as well an additional "Nou Hau Talk" section, featuring interviews with other Japanese artists. The magazine had an array of contributors who serialized many series in the magazine:

- Dai Okazaki — One of the first contributors out of four who became famous on the TV show Takeshi no Dare Demo Picasso and became known as "Smelly". Dai was also featured on the cover of issue 3. Dai Okazaki started serializing a Smelly manga in May 1999 and also started the series entitled Bijutsu Techō in October 1999.
- Mai Shibasaki — Also one of the first contributors who illustrated the cover of issue 1 in January 1999.
- Ryoji Shibasaki — Along with his sister Mai Shibasaki, Ryoji was also one of the first contributors who illustrated the cover of issue 2.
- Takashi Okazaki — Also one of the first contributors who serialized the manga Afro Samurai within the pages of Nou Nou Hau. Afro Samurai first appeared in the promotional issue 0, and then was officially first serialized in the January 1999 issue.
