= Moga Mobo =

Moga Mobo is a German comics magazine published since 1994 by the Berlin-based art group of the same name. The group consists of artists Titus Ackermann, Jonas Greulich and Thomas Gronle (Legron). The comic has an irregular publishing schedule, the theme and format changes every issue. It is distributed for free in pubs, cinemas and comics shops. Their motto is "Comix for everybody".

== History ==
Moga Mobo was founded in Stuttgart. It is known for their innovation and experimentation in the comics format. Their December 1997 issue was published in the form of an Advent calendar which consisted of mini comics by different artists for each day. A similar format was used in their 2003 issues about luck (10 wege zum glück). In 2001, they published an issue in book format that included a hundred masterworks of world literature, each presented as a single page comic (100 Meisterwerke der Weltliteratur) which later won the Max & Moritz Prize for Best German-language Comic.

The group often collaborates internationally with other artists and magazines. Their #87 issue titled Live in Japan was the result of a collaboration with the Nou Nou Hau group. This was followed up in #100 published as a trilingual, English, German, Japanese book called Kugelblitz - Moga Mobo vs Nou Nou Hau Vol 2. In 2009, they worked together with Cuban comic artists for an issue. They offer a comic blog about cities and climate change called Morgenstadt 2050: Stories from Today & Tomorrow they worked together with thirteen comic artists from Asia. The comics in the blog were later published in a book form as issue 107.
