= Takashi Okazaki =

Japanese manga artist, visual and graphic designer

Takashi Okazaki 岡崎 能士
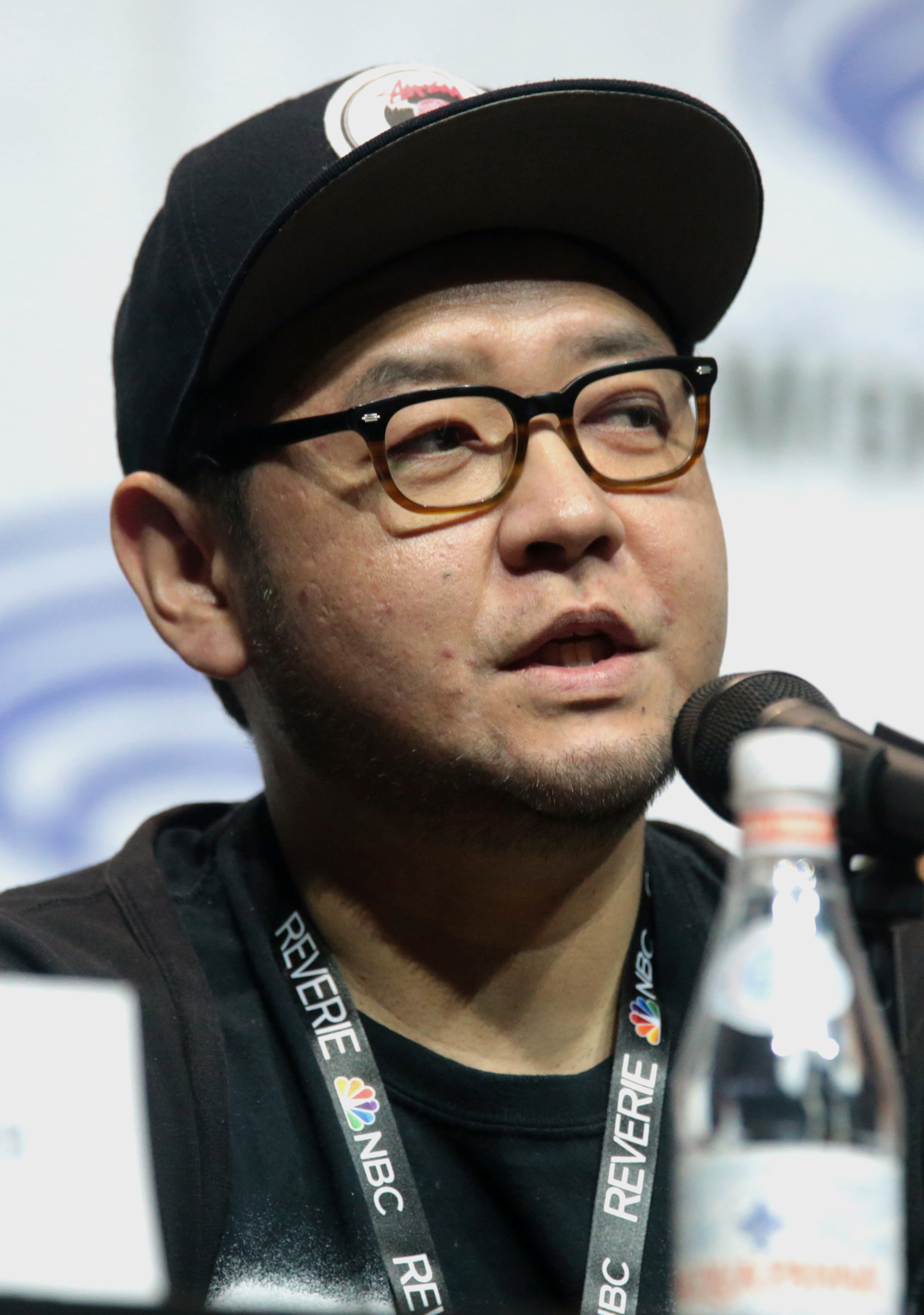
- Okazaki at the 2018 WonderCon
- Born: March 18, 1974 (age 52) Kanagawa Prefecture, Japan
- Areas: Manga artist and author, visual designer, graphic designer
- Notable works: Afro Samurai
- Awards: Primetime Emmy Award (Outstanding Individual Achievement In Animation)

Takashi Okazaki (岡崎 能士, Okazaki Takashi) (born March 18, 1974) is a Japanese manga artist, visual designer and graphic designer, most notable for writing and illustrating the manga series Afro Samurai.

== Early life ==
Okazaki was born in Kanagawa Prefecture and graduated from the Tama University of the Arts.

== Career ==
Okazaki was one of four artists to debut in the self-published Nou Nou Hau manga magazine in November 1998. His first manga series, Afro Samurai, was first published as a dōjinshi in the preparatory issue zero of the magazine, and was featured as the cover. Afro Samurai was serialized until the magazine's end in September 2002. Afro Samurai was adapted into an anime miniseries and a sequel television film, Afro Samurai: Resurrection. After the release of the anime series, Takashi Okazaki went back and recreated the original dōjinshi into a two-volume manga series which was released in the United States by Tor Books and Seven Seas Entertainment. Also, the first volume has been released in Germany, the second to be released in August 2011.

On November 23, 2004, Okazaki wrote and illustrated a 9-panel manga published in the pamphlet of the Blade: Trinity soundtrack. Takashi Okazaki also illustrated the ending of the Cho-Kōryu-Gōjin Danke Choen (超交流合神ダンケシェーン) series serialized in a flyer handed out at the Japanese club "UNIT". Cho-Kōryu-Gōjin Danke Choen was created by Kugelblitz – a collaborative effort between Nou Nou Hau and the German comic magazine Moga Mobo. Okazaki also designed the characters in The Game Baker's 2016 game, Furi. He is also credited as original character designer for the 2017 Garo: Vanishing Line anime.

In April 2020, Okazaki made his debut as a Marvel Comics cover artist for the re-launch of Werewolf By Night. He has also created covers for multiple other Marvel titles, including Black Widow, Non-Stop Spiderman, Falcon & Winter Soldier, Iron Fist Heart of the Dragon, and Deadpool: Black, White & Blood.

Okazaki created the portrait of Los Angeles Angels two-way player Shohei Ohtani for the cover of the MVP and Digital Deluxe editions of MLB The Show 22. He also designed art for cards used in the Diamond Dynasty game mode of MLB The Show 22, including many Baseball Hall of Fame players such as Randy Johnson, Babe Ruth, Ken Griffey Jr, Rickey Henderson and Honus Wagner.

In June 2023, Okazaki announced a brand new original manga project titled "NUMB".

In September 2026, Okazaki won an Emmy award for his work on Star Wars: Visions, taking home "Outstanding Individual Achievement In Animation" for the character design in "The Duel – Payback".

== Works ==
- Afro Samurai! (dojinshi manga, 1998–2002)
- 9-panel Blade:Trinity (2004)
- Cho-Kōryu-Gōjin Danke Choen (超交流合神ダンケシェーン) (2005)
- Afro Samurai Maniaxxx!!! (2007)
- Afro Samurai (2008–2009)
- Summer Wars (character design, 2009)
- Izanagi Online (mobile game, character design, 2015)
- Furi (artistic director, 2016)
- Garo: Vanishing Line (character designer, 2017)
- Batman Ninja (character designer, 2018)
- Sound and Fury (film, artistic director, 2019)
- Star Wars: Visions episode 1: "The Duel" (writer, character designer, concept artist, artistic director, 2021)
- Ninja Kamui (character designer, 2024)
- Batman Ninja vs. Yakuza League (character designer, 2025)
- Star Wars: Visions episode 19: "The Duel: Payback" (character designer, concept artist, artistic director, 2025)
- Ghost of Tsushima: Legends (character designer, 2027)
