= Afro Samurai (video game) =

2009 video game

- Developer: Namco Bandai Games
- Publisher: Namco Bandai Games (Note: Released under the Surge brand name in North America, and the Namco brand name in Europe and Asia)
- Designer: Asahiko Kikuchi
- Programmers: Daniel Chan; Masaki Namura
- Artists: Hoang Nguyen; Bryan Johnson
- Writer: Paul Gardner
- Composer: Howard Drossin
- Platforms: PlayStation 3, Xbox 360
- Release: NA: January 27, 2009; PAL: March 27, 2009
- Genres: Action, hack and slash
- Mode: Single-player

Afro Samurai is a 2009 action video game developed and published by Namco Bandai Games for the PlayStation 3 and Xbox 360. It is loosely based on the manga and anime series of the same name. It was released on January 27, 2009. The game was developed by Namco Bandai Games and in North America, it was the first (and would end up being the only) game published under their western label, Surge. In Europe and Australia the game was released under the Namco brand instead and was distributed by Atari Europe.

== Gameplay ==
Afro Samurai features a cel-shaded animation style.

Afro Samurai is a 3D brawler with platforming elements. Most levels culminate in a boss fight, which become more frequent as the game progresses.

The game features a cel-shaded animation style. In a combat system designed by Monty Oum, the player will use hits, kicks, and sword slashes against various enemies. There is also a magic pendant which can slow down the time and allows performing special moves. Even though it is a hack and slash game, the fighting is slow-paced while relying on combos and thus friendly for newbies. At certain points "Body Part Poker" will appear, where the player must cut off specific things at the right moment to collect body part cards and win achievements.

== Plot ==
It is said that the warrior who becomes "Number One" will rule the world, wielding powers akin to a god. Someone becomes Number One only by killing the previous Number One and taking his ceremonial headband. However, only the "Number Two" is allowed to challenge the Number One. Because of this, few people ever reach Number One because the Number Two headband is constantly changing owners,

Afro's father was the old Number One until he was brutally killed by a gunman named Justice, an event witnessed by Afro as a child. Now an adult, Afro Samurai is the current Number Two and a master swordsman who seeks revenge on Justice. Lengthy flashbacks throughout the story detail how Afro rose from a frightened boy fleeing the death of his father to a brutal samurai warrior, and eventually became the current "Number Two". The story in the present deals with the adult Afro making his way to the mountain top keep of the "Number One" to duel Justice, while at the same time battling a mysterious cult known as the Empty Seven Clan as their agents repeatedly try to kill Afro and take his Number Two headband.

Ultimately, Afro discovers that Justice is already long dead, rendering his quest meaningless. After defeating a hallucination of Justice in single combat, Afro realizes that the headbands only bring pain and death. He throws them into an abyss, choosing to end the cycle of violence for good.

== Development ==
=== Voice acting and music ===
All of the main characters are voiced by the same actors as in the anime. Mary Elizabeth McGlynn served as the voice director, while the hip hop producer RZA was behind the soundtrack of the game.

=== Downloadable content ===
The game's credits reveal that Namco Bandai commissioned a TV screenwriter, Peter Saji, to produce a storyline for a downloadable episode. In an interview, Saji admitted that multiple downloadable episodes are in production, but could not provide a release date.

== Reception ==
Reception

Aggregate score
Aggregator	Score
Metacritic	PS3: 65/100; X360: 65/100

Review scores
Publication	Score
1Up.com	C−
Game Informer	7.75/10
GamePro	3.5/5
GameSpot	7.0/10
GameSpy	2/5
GameZone	6.9/10
IGN	6.6/10
Official Xbox Magazine (US)	7.5/10
X-Play	3/5
Extreme Gamer	7.9/10

The game was given moderate reviews, resulting in the Metacritic score of 65/100. Namco Bandai posted on its fiscal year report that the game sold 420,000 copies across all platforms in the US and Europe.

== Sequel ==
An episodic sequel was announced in June 2015, called Afro Samurai 2: Revenge of Kuma. Volume 1 was released on PlayStation 4 and PC on September 22, 2015. In November 2015, the game was removed from the PlayStation Store and Steam with volumes 2 and 3 being cancelled due to negative reception. The Xbox One version was also never released.
