= Malukah =

Mexican video game musician

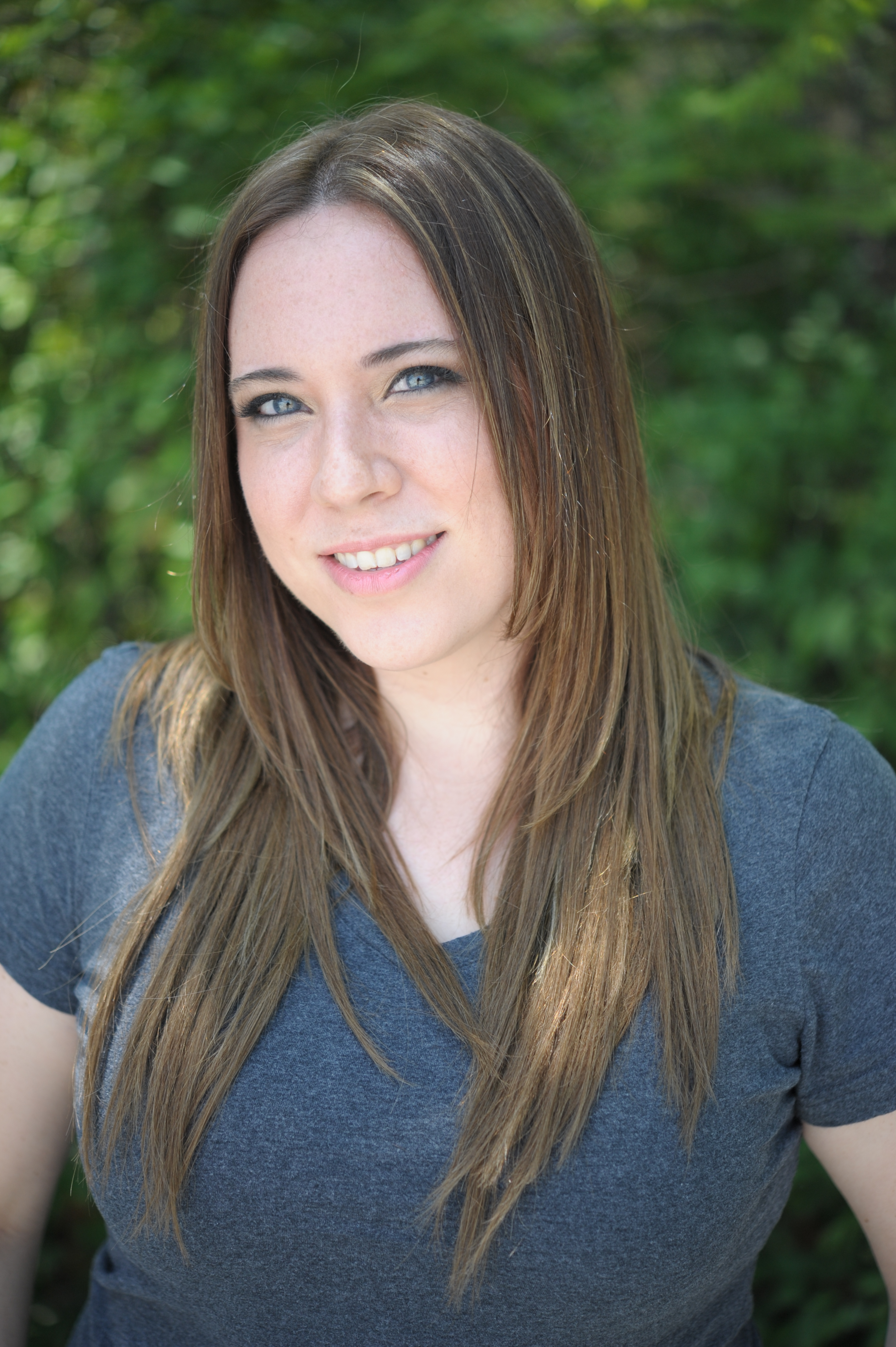

Background information
- Also known as: Malukah
- Born: Judith de los Santos; 1982 (age 43–44)
- Origin: Monterrey, Nuevo León, Mexico
- Genre: Pop rock
- Occupations: Singer, songwriter, composer
- Instruments: Guitar, Piano, Percussion
- Years active: 2005–present
- Labels: Materia Collective, independent
- Website: www.malukah.com

Judith de los Santos (born 1982), known professionally as Malukah, is a Mexican composer and singer-songwriter known for her cover versions of music from video games or TV series and movies, which she publishes on YouTube. She became known to an international audience when a video of her cover of the song The Dragonborn Comes from the game The Elder Scrolls V: Skyrim became a viral video in November 2011. Since then she has contributed to several video game soundtracks, composed and produced original music, and performed live.

== Career ==
=== Early career and education ===
Being a gamer since childhood, Judith de los Santos grew up with gaming related music. She started writing songs and singing at the age of 15, took guitar, piano and percussion lessons to later study at the Berklee College of Music. She graduated in 2005 with a dual major in Music Production and Engineering and Film Scoring with her debut album All of the Above.

=== YouTube and video game soundtracks ===
In November 2011, shortly after the release of The Elder Scrolls V: Skyrim, her cover version of the game's song The Dragonborn Comes went viral. The video was reposted on the IGN YouTube channel as well as gaming-related websites and became quickly popular. The original video on her own channel has over 27 million views, while the version on IGN's channel has over 18 million views by February 2025. This and other popular videos, including songs set to music from the Mass Effect, Halo and The Witcher game series helped her to obtain work in the video game industry.

Malukah
- Other name: malufenix
- Education: Berklee College of Music

YouTube information
- Channel: malufenix
- Genres: Fantasy Folk Rock (covers, medleys, originals)
- Subscribers: 695 thousand
- Views: 141 million
- Last updated: 02 June 2026

She was commissioned to provide vocals for songs for the game Call of Duty: Black Ops II in 2012, The Banner Saga franchise (collaborating with Austin Wintory, Taylor Davis and Peter Hollens). In 2014, she composed and sang the ingame NPC bard songs and the end credits song Beauty of Dawn for the MMORPG Elder Scrolls Online. She was invited to be a part of an upcoming symphony project by video game composer Jeremy Soule, The Northerner. She provided vocals for music in the short film The Forge, collaborating with Austin Wintory and Tina Guo. She worked with Peter Hollens on a cover version of the Civilization IV Theme (originally composed by Christopher Tin) Baba Yetu. Together they also worked on a cover of Lullaby of Woe, a song from the Witcher 3 soundtrack. Her vocals were featured in the song Outside the Realm in the 2nd season Stranger Things soundtrack. The song was originally composed by Big Giant Circles for the video game There Came an Echo and was reused as thematic music for this purpose. She also worked with Miracle of Sound on his popular song Legends of the Frost based on the video game The Elder Scrolls V: Skyrim. She is featured on the Call of Duty: Black Ops 3 soundtrack. She provided vocal effects for the game Far Cry Primal working with BAFTA award-winning composer Jason Graves. Recently, she contributed to the soundtracks of the video games Call of Duty: Black Ops 4 and the PlayStation 4 Virtual reality game Moss. She and other musicians were invited by CD Projekt musical director Marcin Przybyłowicz to participate in a music video that recreates The Witcher 3: Wild Hunt main theme to celebrate the game's 5th anniversary in 2020. Lately, she contributed vocals to music to the game The Pathless, worked on vocal editing in Call of Duty: Black Ops Cold War for the song Alone, and contributed both vocals and vocal editing for multiple tracks in Call of Duty: Black Ops 6.

=== Live performances, streaming and original music ===
She performed the Halo tribute song Frozen Sleep at the Halo Global Championships 2013 at PAX Prime. Furthermore, she performed video game music at SXSW and The Game Awards. She was a guest performer at the Video Games Live E3 concert 2014 in Los Angeles and in her hometown Monterrey in 2016. She was invited to sing at The Elder Scrolls Online tavern community event during Gamescom 2018 in Cologne, Germany. She performed at the Argentina Game Show in Buenos Aires in 2019 and the CES 2020 in Las Vegas.

Malukah streamed as a partnered streamer on Twitch for almost 1,000 hours between 2016 and 2020, having reached 662,000 views and 38,800 followers in the music & performing arts and gaming category. Since 2020, she focused live streaming on YouTube.

In 2019, she released her latest original album I Follow the Moon.

== Style and genre ==
Her two original albums mostly cover the genres Pop rock or Folk rock. Collaborations with other musicians like Sonic Mayhem or Headhunterz are influenced by electronic music. Her contributions to the Call of Duty: Black Ops games cover the genre of Heavy Metal. The video game contributions, movie related originals, covers and medleys can be classified as fantasy folk rock or fantasy music. Her covers are influenced by music set to games like Mass Effect, The Elder Scrolls, The Witcher, Halo and Destiny, movies like The Hobbit and The Lord of the Rings or TV series like Game of Thrones. Recent releases mainly consist of cover works and single releases to various original songs (e.g. Hallelujah, Sound of Silence). The most gaming-related soundtracks include Answers from Final Fantasy XIV, Nostalgia from the 2022 video game Asterigos: Curse of the Stars by Composer WeiFan Chang) and the cover of Living on The Rooftops from Dying Light 2.

Her vocal range can be considered as alto.

== Discography ==
=== Original albums ===
- All of the Above (self-published album, 2006)
- I Follow the Moon (2019)

=== Featured work ===
- Forget the Lines, Secret (both songs from: Acoustic Cafe Series, Vol.1, 2009)
- Reignite (Headhunterz ft. Malukah, 2012)
- Legends of the Frost (Miracle of Sound, ft. Malukah, 2012)
- Bleed Forever (in: Doomsday, Sonic Mayhem ft. Malukah, 2015)
- World of Warcraft: Malach, Angel Messenger (in: Video Games Level 5, 2016)
- Al Fin (from: Song Planet, 2016)
- One More Time (from: Days of Tomorrow, R. Armando Morabito, 2017)

=== Cover related albums/singles ===
- The Dragonborn Comes (2017)
- Reignite, a tribute to Mass Effect, single, released by Materia Collective (2020)
- Lullaby of Woe (from: The Witcher 3, ft. work with Peter Hollens, 2020)
- Good Riddance (ft. work with Peter Hollens, 2021)
- Come little children (single, cover, 2021)
- Malukah Covers Vol 1. (cover album, 2022)
- Malukah Covers Vol 2. (cover album, 2024)
- The Dragonborn Comes (Remastered 2024)
- The Skye Boat Song (Outlander Main Theme), (cover, 2025)
- Love Story (Wedding Waltz), (cover, 2026)

=== Video game soundtrack contributions ===
Year	Game	Song(s)	Contribution	References
2012	Call of Duty: Black Ops II	Where Are We Going?, Always Running, Archangel	vocals	
2012	Journey	Journey Waltz	vocals	
2013	The Banner Saga	Onward	vocals & lyrics	
2014	The Elder Scrolls Online	End credits: Beauty of Dawn Bard songs: Battle of Glenumbra Moors, Chim-El Adabal The Coldharbour Compact, Hymn to Kyne, Ithguleoir, Ode to Queen Ayrenn, Over the Seas and Far Away, The Plane Meld, Stagger and Sway, Three Hearts as One	composer, vocals & lyrics	
2015	There Came an Echo	There Came An Echo Theme, Waiting For Fire	vocals	
2015	Sunset	Esperanza En Duelo, Eres Mi Vela (both Spanish traditional)	vocals & lyrics	
2015	Monaco	What Yours Is Mine	vocals	
2015	Call of Duty: Black Ops III	Zombie Menu Music, Dead Flowers Dead Again, Dead Ended, The Gift	vocals vocal editor	
2016	Far Cry Primal	ingame/soundtrack female character voice-acting (shouts)	vocals	
2016	The Banner Saga 2	Our Steps, To The Night	lyrics & vocals	
2017	Lone Echo	Ready at Dawn	vocals	
2018	The Banner Saga 3	Only Few Remember It Now	vocals	
2018	Moss	Home To Me	vocals	
2018	Call of Duty: Black Ops 4	Where Are We Going? (updated version), Drowning Mystery, Shockwave, Drowning, Stormbound, I Am The Well	vocals vocal editor	
2020	The Pathless	A land, which was not my own (choir)	vocals	
2020	Call of Duty: Black Ops Cold War	Alone	vocal editor	
2023	No Rest for the Wicked	We Prayed for Summer	vocals	
2023	The Dark Pictures: Switchback VR	Theme Song	vocals	
2024	Call of Duty: Black Ops 6	Can You Hear Me? (Come in), Falling to Pieces Can You Hear Me? (Come in), Destroy Something Beautifu	vocals vocal editor	
2025	Sword of the Sea	ingame soundtrack (e.g. One drop remained)	vocals	

=== TV soundtrack contributions ===
- Panic Nation (2010, lyricist, composer)
- The Forge (short film, 2013, feat. vocals)
- Outside the Realm (feat. vocals), Stranger Things (Season 2, episodes 02 and 07)

=== Collaborations ===
Malukah's collaborations usually involve other YouTube musicians like singer Peter Hollens or violinist Taylor Davis. For her video game contributions, she repeatedly worked with the composers Austin Wintory and Jason Graves. Further collaborations involved musicians like Elena Siegman, Tina Guo and Kevin Sherwood. Most noted were her collaborations with ZeniMax Online Studios for the bard songs and end credits song of The Elder Scrolls Online and with Treyarch for the Call of Duty: Black Ops franchise, contributing to several of the Zombie easter egg songs. She also provided vocals for Austin Wintory’s Sword of the Sea soundtrack, which won the 2026 Grammy Award for Best Score Soundtrack for Video Games and Other Interactive Media.

== Awards ==
- Winner of the 10th Unisong International Song Contest 2005 (Everything)
- Two wins in the Rock category at the 16th LA Music Awards as female singer-songwriter of the year (Everything) and female vocalist of the year (I can't make it rain), and another nomination in Rock category for best album (All of the Above) in 2006.

== Trivia ==
- Malukah is known to sing in various real and fantasy languages. For parts of her cover versions from The Elder Scrolls franchise, she sang in dragon language, Dragon-tongue. For her cover version of Priscilla's song from the game The Witcher 3: Wild Hunt, she sang one verse in Polish as a tribute to the country, where The Witcher franchise has originated. For The Banner Saga soundtrack she sang in Icelandic. For the Civilization IV theme Baba Yetu she sang in Swahili. For the cover The Fields of Ard Skellig, a song from The Witcher 3: Wild Hunt original soundtrack, she sang in Gaelic.
- Her bard songs can be listened to in-game performed by several bard NPCs in The Elder Scrolls Online.
- A NPC with the name of Malukah Lightsong was introduced with the Patch 6.2.0 in the video game World of Warcraft.
- She wrote a self-published short novel called The Stolen Pendant.
- The Skyrim modding community has added her Dragonborn cover to various game mods.
