= Jóhann Sigurðarson =

Icelandic actor, voice actor, and singer

- Born: 21 April 1956 (age 70)
- Education: Icelandic Drama School
- Occupations: Actor, voice actor and singer
- Years active: 1981–present

Jóhann Sigurðarson (born 21 April 1956) is an Icelandic actor, voice actor and singer. He is known for his role as Leifur in Trapped and The Minister.

== Career ==
Jóhann graduated from the Icelandic Drama School in 1981. He has been involved in numerous productions with the National Theatre of Iceland and Reykjavík City Theatre as well as starring in many Icelandic films. From 2000-2001 he studied singing in Italy. In 2008 he was awarded "Town Artist" from the town of Garðabær, Iceland. He has from time to time performed with the Icelandic Opera.

== Selected filmography ==
- 101 Reykjavík (2000) as Páll
- Kaldaljós (2004) as Stranger
- Brúðguminn (2008) as Lárus
- Mamma Gógó (2010) as Bank Manager
- Trapped (2015-2016) (TV-series) as Leifur
- Woman at War (2018) as Sveinbjörn
- Blackport (2021) (TV-series) as Sólon
- Afturelding (2023) (TV-series) as Rúrík

== Video game roles ==
- Banner Saga (2014) as Ubin
- Banner Saga 2 (2016) as Ubin

== Music recording ==
- Banner Saga Original Soundtrack (2014) by Austin Wintory
  - "We are all Guests upon the Land"
  - "Onward"
- The Banner Saga 3 (2018) by Austin Wintory
  - "Darkness Rises"
  - "Steel Flowing as Water"
  - "Trees Cannot Grow in a Moonless Sky"

== Personal life ==
Jóhann's first wife was Anna Jóna Jónsdóttir, mother of Haraldur Ingi Þorleifsson. In 1988, a drunk driver drove into their car, killing Anna and seriously injuring Jóhann. He later married Guðrún Sesselja Arnardóttir, a district attorney. He has two sons, Örn Gauti and Jóhann Ólafur.
