= Towerborne =

- Developer: Stoic
- Publisher: Xbox Game Studios
- Composer: Austin Wintory
- Engine: Unreal Engine
- Platforms: PlayStation 5; Windows; Xbox Series X/S
- Release: February 26, 2026
- Genre: Action role-playing
- Modes: Single-player, multiplayer

Towerborne is a 2026 side-scrolling action role-playing video game developed by Stoic and published by Xbox Game Studios. It released on Windows (via Steam) as an early access game on September 10, 2024, and was released for Xbox Series X/S on April 29, 2025, through Xbox Game Preview. The full game was released for PlayStation 5, Windows and Xbox Series X/S in February 26, 2026.

== Gameplay ==
The player is engaging in combat with a boss.

Towerborne is a side-scrolling action role-playing video game inspired by beat 'em ups. The game takes place in the City of Numbers, a post-apocalyptical fantasy world overwhelmed by monsters. The heroes of Towerborne are known as Aces, who must set out to reclaim lost territories and make the land safe while refugees make their way to the Belfry. Aces can be customized at the Belfry, the game's hub world. Players can choose from several weapon classes, including Pyroclast, Rockbreaker, Sentinel, and Shadowstriker. Players are not locked to any playstyle. The game features a hex-based overworld map. As players explore the game's world, they will open up more hexes and therefore, unlock new mission opportunities and encounter new enemy types. The game supports both local and online four-player cooperative multiplayer.

== Development and release ==
Towerborne is being developed by Stoic and published by Xbox Game Studios. The game was developed using Unreal Engine, and the game's art style was inspired by animated feature films. Initially the game was designed to be a 2D game like The Banner Saga series, though this was later expanded to include more axes of movement. The tone of the game is more uplifting when compared with The Banner Saga. While the game is set in a post-apocalyptic world, the tower of Belfry was described by the team as "a beacon of hope and safety amongst the ruins of humanity and the City of Numbers".

Codenamed Project Belfry, the game was first leaked in October 2021. The game was officially announced on June 11, 2023, during the Xbox Games Showcase. Towerborne was envisioned by Stoic as a live service game, with the studio planning to introduce new content to the game following its official launch.

On August 20, 2024, it was announced that the game would release in early access on September 10, 2024 for Windows, with the final game planned to be releasing as a free-to-play game in 2025.

On January 7, 2026, it was announced that the final game would release on February 26, 2026, with the game dropping the free-to-play model in favor of a "complete" experience with offline play support.

== Reception ==
Reception

Aggregate scores
| Aggregator | Score |
|---|---|
| Metacritic | (XSX) 73/100 |
| OpenCritic | 69% recommend |

The Xbox Series X version of Towerborne received "mixed or average" reviews from critics, according to the review aggregation website Metacritic. Fellow review aggregator OpenCritic assessed that the game received strong approval, being recommended by 69% of critics.
