= Ludwig's subathon =

Continuous 31-day livestream in 2021

- Produced by: Ludwig Ahgren
- Starring: Ludwig Ahgren
- Cinematography: Ludwig Ahgren
- Release date: March 14, 2021
- Running time: 44,640 minutes (744 hours; about 31 days)
- Country: United States
- Language: English
- Box office: $1.4 million

On March 14, 2021, American livestreamer Ludwig Ahgren began continuously livestreaming on Twitch. The livestream ended on April 13, 2021, after 31 days. A subathon is a type of livestream in which viewer donations add more time to a descending timer that counts down to the end of the stream. Throughout the streams' duration, Ahgren received 282,191 subscriptions, breaking the previous record set in 2018 by Tyler "Ninja" Blevins of the most concurrent subscribers on Twitch. The subathon's content consisted of talking to his viewers and stream moderators, playing games, and sleeping, among other various daily activities. During Ahgren's sleep breaks (which comprised about a third of the stream) his moderators entertained the audience, for which they were financially compensated. Ahgren grossed US$1,434,850 (equivalent to $1,704,798 in 2025) from the stream, before taxes, charity donations, and other deductions. Not including sponsorships, Ahgren profited $202,000 ($240,004 in 2025).

Publications highlighted the stream's consistent and comforting presence. Others used the subathon as a discussion starter about Twitch's lack of protective systems for marathon streams, sexism in sleep streams, and the healthiness of streams of such length (although the subathon was considered well-planned for his wellbeing). Ahgren's stream greatly popularized subathons and other streamers have held their own as a result of this trend. Ahgren's subscription record was broken by Kai Cenat in February 2023.

== Background ==
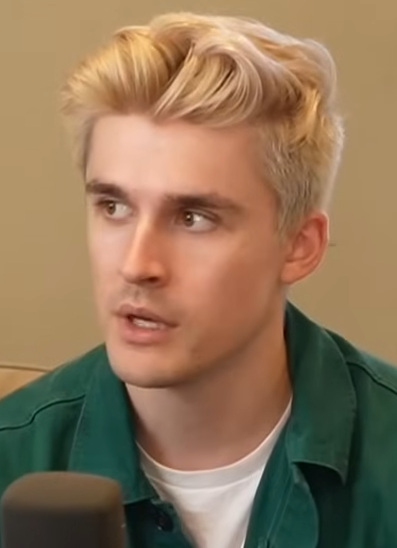
Ahgren in 2022

Ludwig Ahgren is an American livestreamer and YouTuber. He gained prevalence in 2018 and 2019 and quickly rose to popularity. Ahgren saw further growth from the 2020 resurgence of the 2018 video game Among Us. Twitch—then Ahgren's livestreaming platform—also saw heightened popularity in 2020, partially due to the COVID-19 lockdowns creating a higher demand for online entertainment. According to Taylor Lorenz of The New York Times, Ahgren's stream may be "an extension of the trend of creators monetizing more and more parts of their lives".

In March 2021, Ahgren had planned a 24-hour stream, but it was rescheduled due to Ahgren undergoing an appendectomy. The rescheduled stream was altered to be a subathon. Short for "subscription marathon", a subathon is a type of livestream where every time a streamer receives a subscription—US$5 donations from viewers—more time is added to a descending timer. Once the timer reaches zero, the stream ends. While subathons existed in the Twitch community prior to Ahgren's stream, they usually did not span multiple days, and were not as prevalent.

== Livestream ==
=== Content ===
The livestream was broadcast on Twitch (logo pictured).

The livestream's content consisted of playing games, such as Super Mario Odyssey and Pokémon; cooking; talking to his viewers and moderators; watching movies; exercising in his garage; and sleeping. Ahgren spent 31.5% of the stream sleeping and 22.4% under Twitch's category "Just Chatting". When Ahgren had to take bathroom or sleep breaks from the stream, his moderators would entertain the stream by talking, watching videos, and playing movies. Once, Ahgren showered on camera while wearing shorts. Ahgren's roommates and QTCinderella made stream appearances at times. Kotaku's Nathan Grayson wrote, you can "just spend your whole day with Ahgren".

=== Timeline ===
Ludwig Ahgren
(@LudwigAhgren)
tweeted:

I fell asleep on stream last night and became the most watched streamer on Twitch. What the hell is even that.

March 15, 2021

Ahgren began livestreaming to Twitch on March 14, 2021; he had 1,730 subscriptions the day prior. Initially, Ahgren thought the stream would last around 24 to 48 hours. At the start of the subathon, every subscription added 20 seconds to the subathon's timer, but it was later brought down to 10 seconds. Ahgren instated a maximum cap of 100 gift subscription purchases by a single user, which would cost $500 (gift subscriptions are subscriptions purchased by one user but given to others). At one point during Ahgren's sleep between March 14 and 15, he had the most concurrent viewers of any Twitch stream, and was trending on Twitter. On March 27, Ahgren was absent due to a trip. Fellow streamer and Ahgren's roommate Slime took over the stream during this period. On April 4, Ahgren, QTCinderella, and their roommates were swatted. The stream momentarily ended; once it returned, Ahgren and QTCinderella hid the swatting from the stream viewers.

On April 10, the stream was one second away from ending before subscriptions were quickly added to bring the timer up. On April 13, Ahgren broke Tyler "Ninja" Blevins' record for the most concurrent subscribers on Twitch; Ahgren had 271,000 on that date, while Blevins' 2018 record was 269,154. Blevins replied on Twitter by saying, "I would be lying if I said [I] wasn't a little sad, but congrats [Ludwig] on holding the new sub record". The subathon's timer did not run out; Ahgren set a cutoff date for the stream—April 13—to prevent it from continuing indefinitely. For every subscription purchased on April 13, Ahgren donated $5 to the Humane Society of the United States and St. Jude Children's Research Hospital. The stream ended on April 13, 2021, at 9 pm (PDT), after running for 31 days. Ahgren had 282,191 subscriptions at the stream's end, and had surpassed two million followers. Overall, Ahgren averaged around 43,000 viewers during the stream. Following the stream, he stated he would not do another subathon. On April 19, Ahgren hosted a giveaway of free stickers to subscribers of the subathon.

== Earnings ==
Distribution of earnings
1. Twitch cut (31.0%)
2. Charity (25.6%)
3. Taxes (16.8%)
4. Profit (14.2%)
5. Moderators (12.4%)

In total, the livestream grossed $1,434,850 (equivalent to $1,704,798 in 2025). Ahgren did not profit all of these earnings: Twitch took a cut of $441,872 ($525,004 in 2025); Ahgren donated $365,000 ($433,670 in 2025) to charities; Ahgren paid his moderators, with administrative costs totaling $177,000 ($210,300 in 2025); and taxes were deducted. Not including sponsorships, Ahgren profited $202,000 ($240,004 in 2025) from the stream. When analyzing which activity produced the most subscriptions per hour, the top 3 activities (highest to lowest) were: Twitch's "Just Chatting" category, sleeping, and playing Magic The Gathering. The worst earner was the video game TrackMania. Ahgren paid his 15 moderators since they did substantial work in the stream's upkeep; many streamers do not pay their moderators.

== Reception and reactions ==
Nathan Grayson of Kotaku called the livestream "one of Twitch's most consistent and comforting presences". Similarly, a viewer interviewed by The New York Times' Taylor Lorenz said the stream gave comfort and connection. Peter Marsh of ABC News compared the stream to a high school sleepover, and said the stream "developed a life of its own, with in-jokes, memes and characters", while Bijan Stephen of The Verge wrote, "It's incredible to me that [...] Twitch still has its own distinct culture and its own set of stars who seem to do stunts like this just because they seem cool".

Morgan Park of PC Gamer incorrectly speculated that the stream would end after Ahgren's absence on March 27, 2021, and highlighted the spontaneity of its possible end. Carol Zhang of Screen Rant attributed the length of the livestream to its "unprecedented popularity". Grayson mentioned the presumed "mental and physical toll on everyone involved". Ahgren has been criticized for holding a subathon while already being wealthy. Grayson wrote, "No matter how much (or how little) he makes off this subathon, Ahgren will remain a rich person who takes a chunk of his money directly from people who are poorer than him. Such is the nature of Twitch." Ahgren told viewers to not donate money from their stimulus checks.

In reaction to Ahgren broadcasting himself sleeping, streamer Lara6683 criticized the Twitch community for perceived sexism: "It's so weird how differently folks react to a man sleeping on stream compared to a woman sleeping on stream". Ahgren's stream also induced discussion on the unhealthiness of lengthy "marathon" streams; although, Grayson wrote, "it could be considered heartening that Ahgren is pioneering a new kind of marathon stream, in which working out and sleeping are just as important as gaming and talking with chat". According to Cody Gravelle of Screen Rant, while Ahgren's stream was well-planned, Twitch should improve its protective systems for streamers, as marathon streams are taxing to streamers' physical and mental health.

== Legacy ==
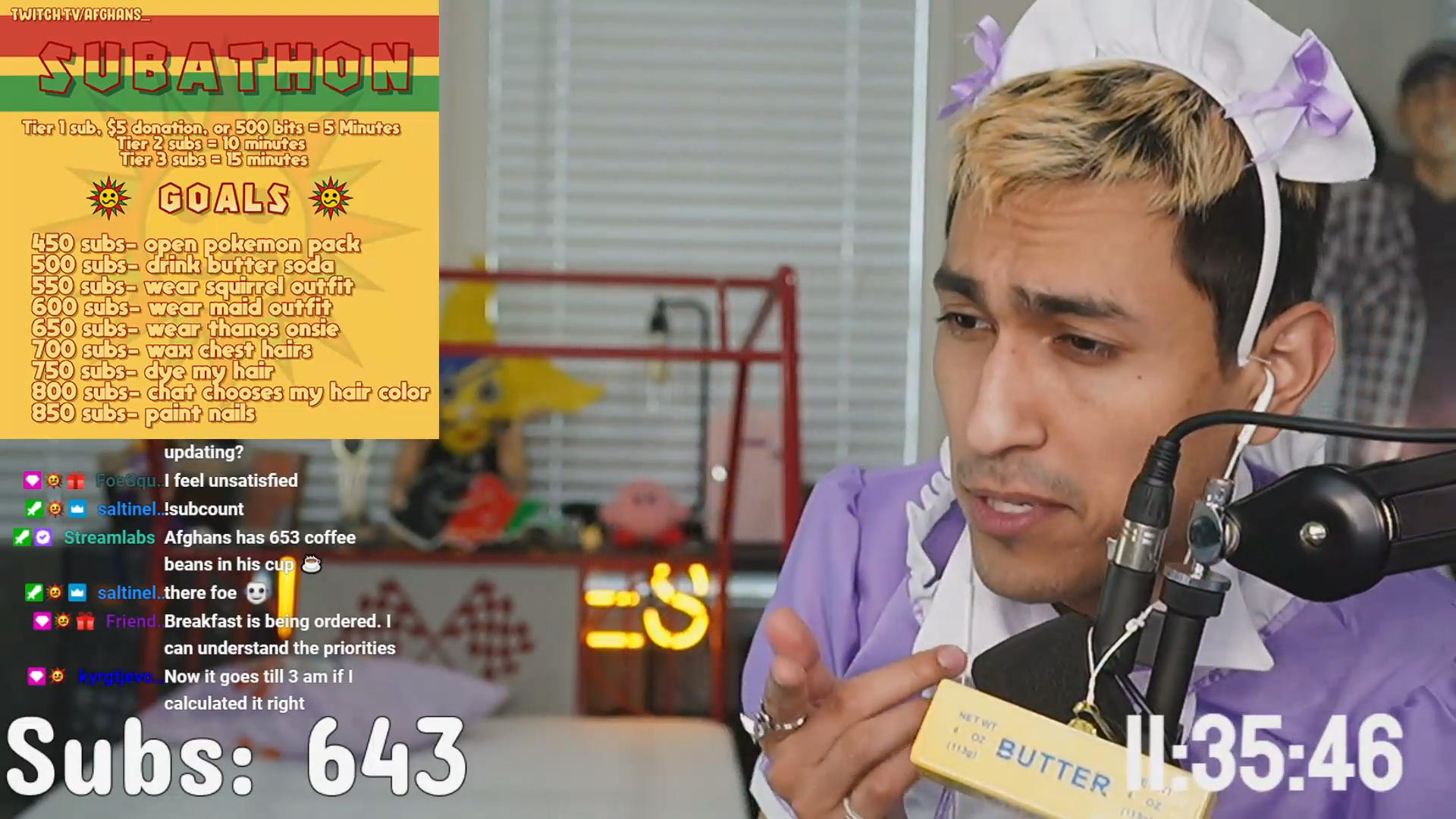
Twitch streamer during a subathon

Publications have noted the stream's significance and influence. Park and Declan McLaughin of Upcomer described the stream as "historic". McLaughin highlighted that mainstream publications reported on it. In 2022, Max Miceli of Dot Esports called Ahgren's subathon the "most high-profile subathon" and credited him with the increased popularity of subathon streams. Streamers Sykkuno, iiTzTimmy, and Ironmouse held subathon streams as a result of this trend started by Ahgren. In reaction to this trend, Ahgren called subathons "boring", and stated "[A subathon] is just a human living their life. It's more Truman Show than content creator creating content worth consuming". Ahgren's subscription record remained unbroken until February 28, 2023, when Kai Cenat reached more than 300,000 subscribers during his 30-day subathon.
