= Stoic (company) =

American video game studio

Stoic LLC
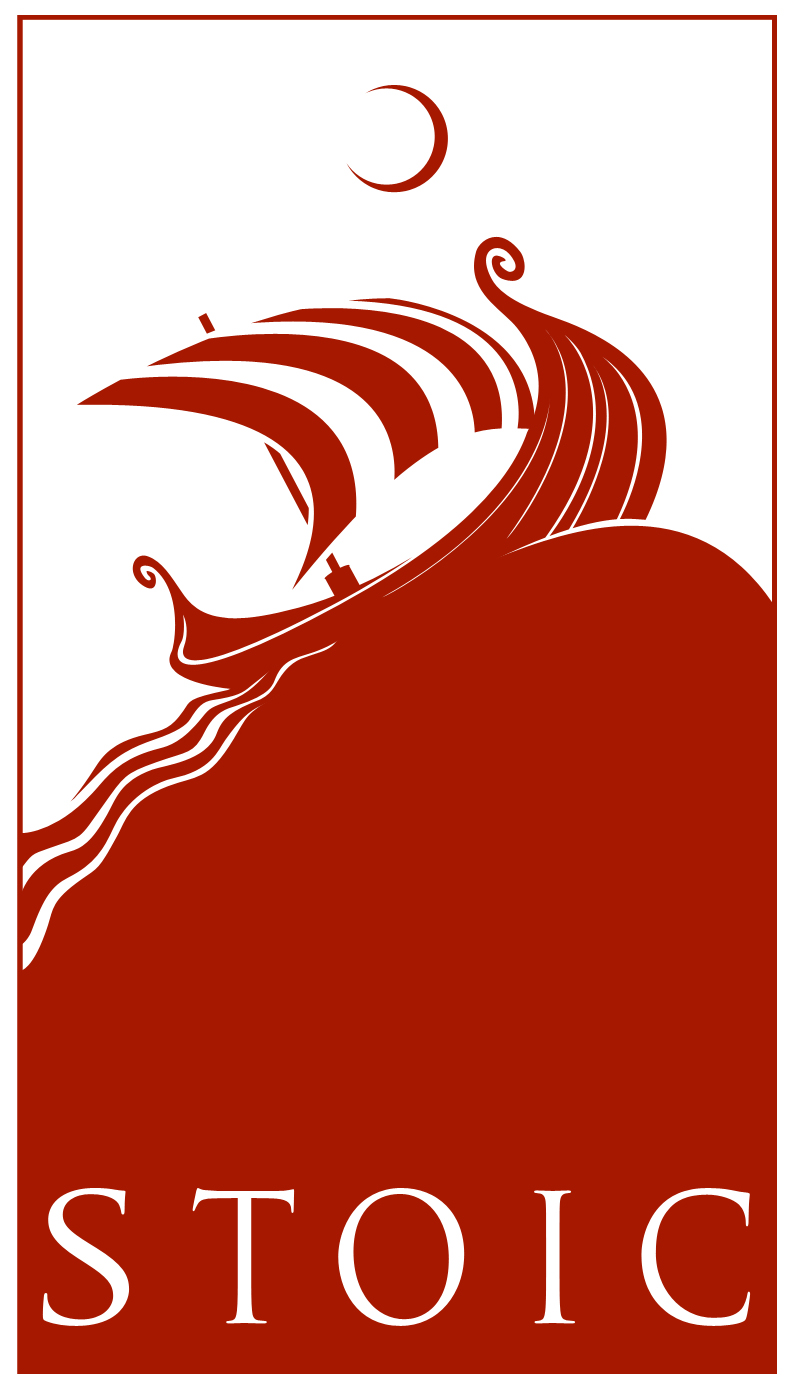
- Type: Private
- Industry: Video games
- Founded: 2012; 14 years ago
- Founders: Arnie Jorgensen; Alex Thomas; John Watson
- Headquarters: Fully Remote, US
- Products: The Banner Saga series
- Website: stoicstudio.com

Stoic, Inc. (also known as Stoic Studio) is a video game developer based in the US. Founded by three ex-BioWare staff in early 2012, Stoic is most known for developing the tactical role-playing game The Banner Saga (2014) and its sequels, The Banner Saga 2 (2016) and The Banner Saga 3 (2018).

== History ==
Stoic was founded by Arnie Jorgensen, John Watson and Alex Thomas in early 2012. They left BioWare in 2012 after finishing the production of Star Wars: The Old Republic and wanted to make their "dream game", which would then become The Banner Saga. Using crowdfunding platform Kickstarter, Stoic successfully funded the game within 2 days, though the team initially wanted to fund the game using their own personal savings. The funds raised far exceeded their expectations, thus the team expanded the game's scope to include more features. The team partnered with Versus Evil, which served as the game's publisher, providing services such as quality assurance. The multiplayer portion of the game was soft launched by Stoic in February 2013 via Steam as a standalone game as The Banner Saga: Factions, while the full game was released in January 2014. The game was a critical and commercial success, thus the team was able to fund the development of The Banner Saga 2 by themselves.

With development lasting for two years, The Banner Saga 2, like its predecessor, also received generally positive reviews when it was released in April 2016. When Watson reflected on the game's development, he noted that the team started crunching as they slowly ran out of money. The game commercial performance disappointed Stoic, with the title selling just a third of its predecessors. Watson attributed the game's failure to the team neglecting the franchise's community, while Versus Evil's General Manager Steve Escalante believed that the game's underwhelming performance was mainly due to increased competition from other titles. The team returned to Kickstarter again for The Banner Saga 3. While Stoic funded most of the game's development, the funds raised via Kickstarter was spent hiring an animation studio, a sound studio and a recording studio in Iceland to assist the title's development. The $200,000 funding goal was reached within a week. The game, the third and last entry in the trilogy, was released on July 26, 2018. 505 Games released a retail bundle containing all three games on the same day.

Towerborne officially left early access and launched its full 1.0 release on February 26, 2026. Developed by Stoic, the cooperative action RPG brawler is available on PC (via Steam and Windows Store), Xbox Series X|S, and PlayStation 5.

Towerborne is a side-scrolling hack-and-slash action RPG with 1 to 4-player co-op, full character customization, and fast-paced combat. You play as an "Ace," an immortal warrior tasked with defending humanity’s sanctuary, the Belfry, against invading hordes.

== Games ==
| Year | Title | Platform(s) |
|---|---|---|
| 2013 | The Banner Saga: Factions | Microsoft Windows |
| 2014 | The Banner Saga | Android, iOS, Linux, Microsoft Windows, OS X, PlayStation 4, Xbox One, Nintendo Switch |
| 2016 | The Banner Saga 2 | Android, iOS, Linux, Microsoft Windows, OS X, PlayStation 4, Xbox One, Nintendo Switch |
| 2018 | The Banner Saga 3 | Microsoft Windows, OS X, PlayStation 4, Xbox One, Nintendo Switch |
| 2026 | Towerborne | Steam, PlayStation 5, Microsoft Windows, Xbox Series X/S |
