= The Banner Saga =

Tactical role-playing video game

- Developer: Stoic
- Publisher: Versus Evil
- Designer: Alex Thomas
- Programmer: John Watson
- Artist: Arnie Jorgensen
- Writer: Alex Thomas
- Composer: Austin Wintory
- Series: The Banner Saga
- Platforms: Android iOS; Linux; Microsoft Windows; OS X PlayStation 4 Xbox One; Nintendo Switch
- Release: Windows, OS X, Linux, iOS, Android; January 14, 2014; PlayStation 4, Xbox One; January 12, 2016; Nintendo Switch; May 17, 2018
- Genre: Tactical role-playing
- Mode: Single-player

The Banner Saga is a tactical role-playing video game developed by Stoic and published by Versus Evil. It was released for personal computers and mobile phones in 2014, for PlayStation 4 and Xbox One in 2016 and for Nintendo Switch in 2018.

Taking place in a fictional world inspired by Norse mythology, the game tells the story of the player's caravan as a whole, as they combat a warlike race named Dredge that despises humans. The game follows two playable characters whose separate stories eventually merge. The interactive story changes depending on players' decisions.

The game's developer, Stoic Studio, was founded by three former BioWare designers. It was funded via Kickstarter, a crowdfunding platform. The hand-drawn animation and art-style featured in the game was inspired by the art of Eyvind Earle, Ralph Bakshi and Don Bluth. Austin Wintory composed the game's music, with Dallas Wind Symphony performing. The game's multiplayer component, The Banner Saga: Factions, was released as a free standalone game before the game's release.

The game received critical praise, notably for the art style, combat, and story. The game was followed by The Banner Saga 2 (2016) and The Banner Saga 3 (2018), which concluded the series.

== Gameplay ==
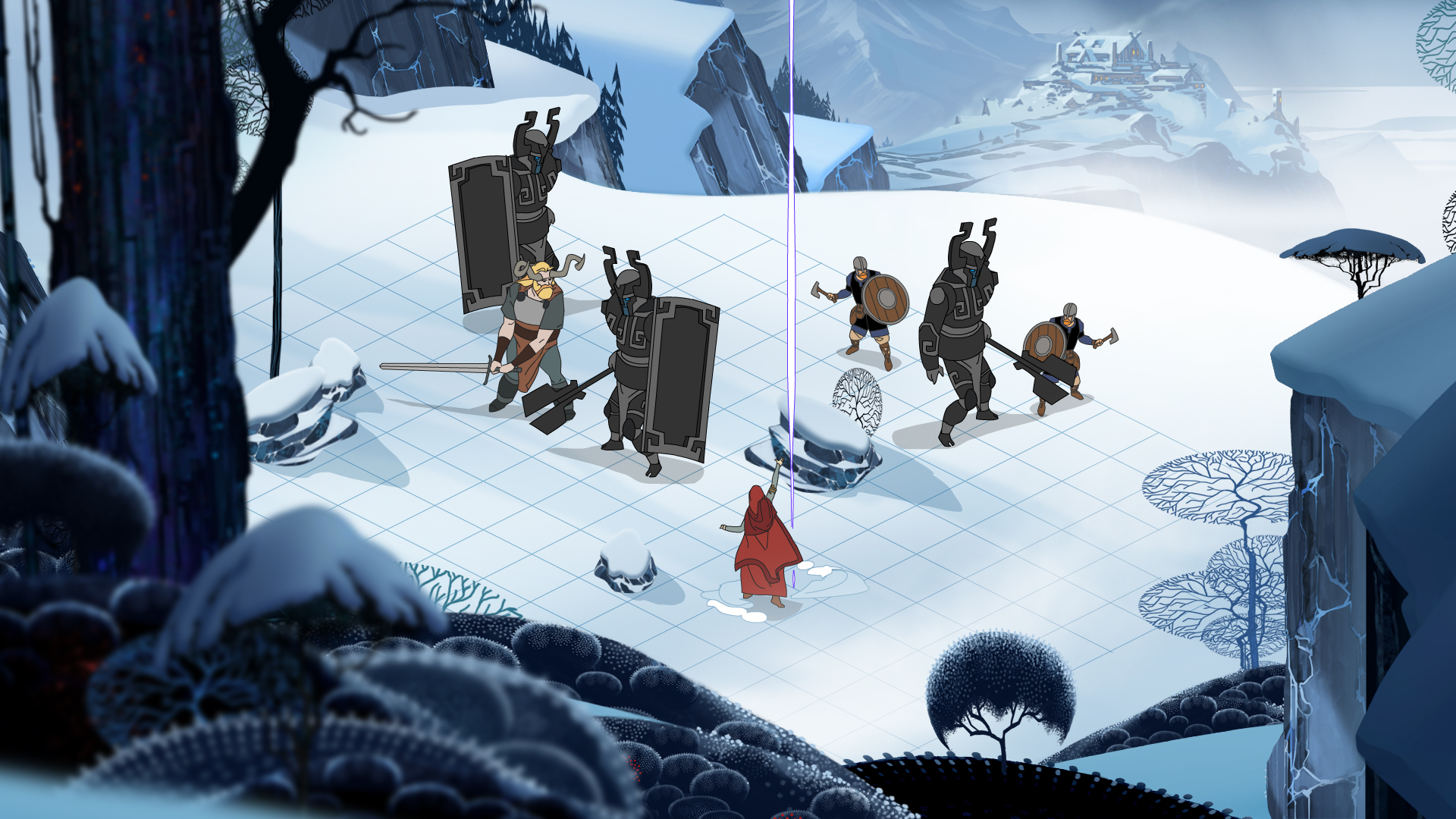
A development screenshot of the game's turn-based combat component

The Banner Saga is an interactive story, meaning that several events may or may not happen depending on the player's choices. The game follows two groups of playable characters, each having their own story that ultimately merges into one. The core of the game is a single-player campaign of turn-based combat engagements inspired by games such as Final Fantasy Tactics and Shining Force, with the player controlling and being able to build up a party of characters with complementary abilities. The game deliberately avoids certain conventions of action-oriented computer role-playing games such as the focus on a young lone hero's story, looting and buying items, or reloading a saved game state after defeat. Instead, the developers intended to tell the story of the player's caravan as a whole, and encourage players to accept and deal with the consequences of any defeats they may encounter.

The Banner Saga centers on the return of the Dredge, a warlike race that despises humans, led by Bellower, a nigh-invincible Dredge who leads them on a warpath. As a wandering army sent to fight against the Dredge and find a weakness for Bellower, the caravan make many difficult decisions that would shape the fate of both man and Varl. Meanwhile, a darkness starts to encompass the world as a giant serpent causes massive earthquakes and breaches across the lands.

== Plot ==
The game takes place in a Viking legend-inspired world, stuck in a perpetual twilight since the sun stopped moving weeks before the events of the game, mainly populated by humans, giant-like creatures called Varl, and the Dredge, an ancient race believed to be extinct for ages and returning to kill them all.

To the west, the Varl Vognir, together with several other companions that include his longtime friend Hakon, the retired Varl warrior Ubin, and the resourceful human Eirik, are charged with escorting Ludin, Prince of the human capital Arberrang, to the Varl capital Grofheim in order to seal an alliance between the two races. In the city of Vedrfell, however, Vognir is slain in an encounter with Dredge, leading Hakon to take command of the caravan. Continuing their way, the caravan faces many of the Dredge and, while exploring the city in the ruins of Ridgehorn, find an unconscious man next to a woman's dead body on the top of a tower. As they rescue him and continue on their way, the man, Eyvind, unsuccessfully implores Hakon to return to Ridgehorn, convinced his companion is still alive. The caravan reaches Grofheim, to find it aflame and completely overrun by Dredge.

On the other side of the country, the hunter Rook and his daughter Alette encounter a lone Dredge near their home of Skogr. They hastily come back to their town and their Varl friend Iver, to find the village attacked by Dredge. Together with the Chieftain's wife Oddleif and the other survivors of the village, they escape to the town of Frostvellr. Finding the town unsafe, they continue their quest for shelter, eventually having no choice but to seek refuge in the Varl fortress of Einartoft. On their way, terrible earthquakes occur, seemingly caused by a massive form in the distance. Although the Varl of Einartoft refuse to let humans in at first, Iver, whose real identity is a legendary, long-disappeared warrior known as Yngvar, persuades them to let the caravan in.

In Einartoft, Rook, Alette, and their companions meet Hakon, Prince Ludin and their own companions, who also took shelter in the fortress after discovering what was left of Grofheim. They all meet with the Varl King, Jorundr. The situation is soon revealed to be desperate here as well, as Einartoft is under siege from the Dredge and their immortal champion, Bellower. With the king refusing to destroy the bridge leading to the fortress, the companions have no choice but to fight the Dredge, leading to Iver being severely wounded and losing an arm in a fight against Bellower. As Eyvind tries to distract Bellower and save Iver, the massive form they saw in the distance earlier, a massive, terrifying serpent, emerges and gives a glance at the battle before going away, causing the Dredge to retreat in fear.

Meanwhile, Juno, the woman whose body was next to Eyvind when Hakon's caravan found him, awakens in the ruins of Ridgehorn, to find the gigantic serpent facing her. After unsuccessfully trying to kill her, the serpent speaks to her, revealing that it was supposed to swallow what was left of the world, but is deeply troubled by the presence of a "darkness" taking over the world instead. After the serpent leaves, Juno contacts Eyvind telepathically, urging him to leave Einartoft and meet her down south in the city of Sigrholm.

Eyvind pleads with Rook to lead him to Sigrholm. Rook agrees, as Einartoft is already doomed, and the caravan leaves, soon warned by Ubin and other survivors catching up with them that the city fell a few hours after they left. When the caravan reaches the unwelcoming city of Sigrholm, Juno is nowhere to be found. Despite Eyvind's protests, Rook decides the only hope they have left is to find shelter in the fortified city of Boersgard. However, they find another city in the brink of chaos, with no boats left and where a group of mercenaries named the Ravens, led by the Varl Bolverk, rules the city. Boersgard finds itself stuck between the sea and a Dredge host. More Dredge arrive every day, while supplies are running out and widespread riots are tearing the city apart from the inside, as Rook and his friends decide their only hope resides in building new boats to leave by the sea before it is too late. As the city's defenses are about to fall before their goal is achieved, they are saved by Juno, together with Hakon, Prince Ludin and an army of Varl who escaped Einartoft at the last moment. Despite this brief moment of triumph, they soon find themselves in more trouble, as Bellower and yet more Dredge arrive. With the help of Rook, Juno creates a magic arrow. The Dredge would rout if Bellower was defeated and, although he is immortal, the arrow would affect his mind, convincing him of his own death and making him fall into a coma. The player is given the choice to give the arrow to either Rook or Alette. The one chosen ultimately hits Bellower, allowing their companions to defeat him and make the Dredge army flee, but is killed by Bellower after shooting him. Some time later, the unified caravans of Rook and Hakon leave Boersgard together with the Ravens on newly constructed boats, afflicted with grief, after giving Rook / Alette a proper farewell and funeral.

== Development ==
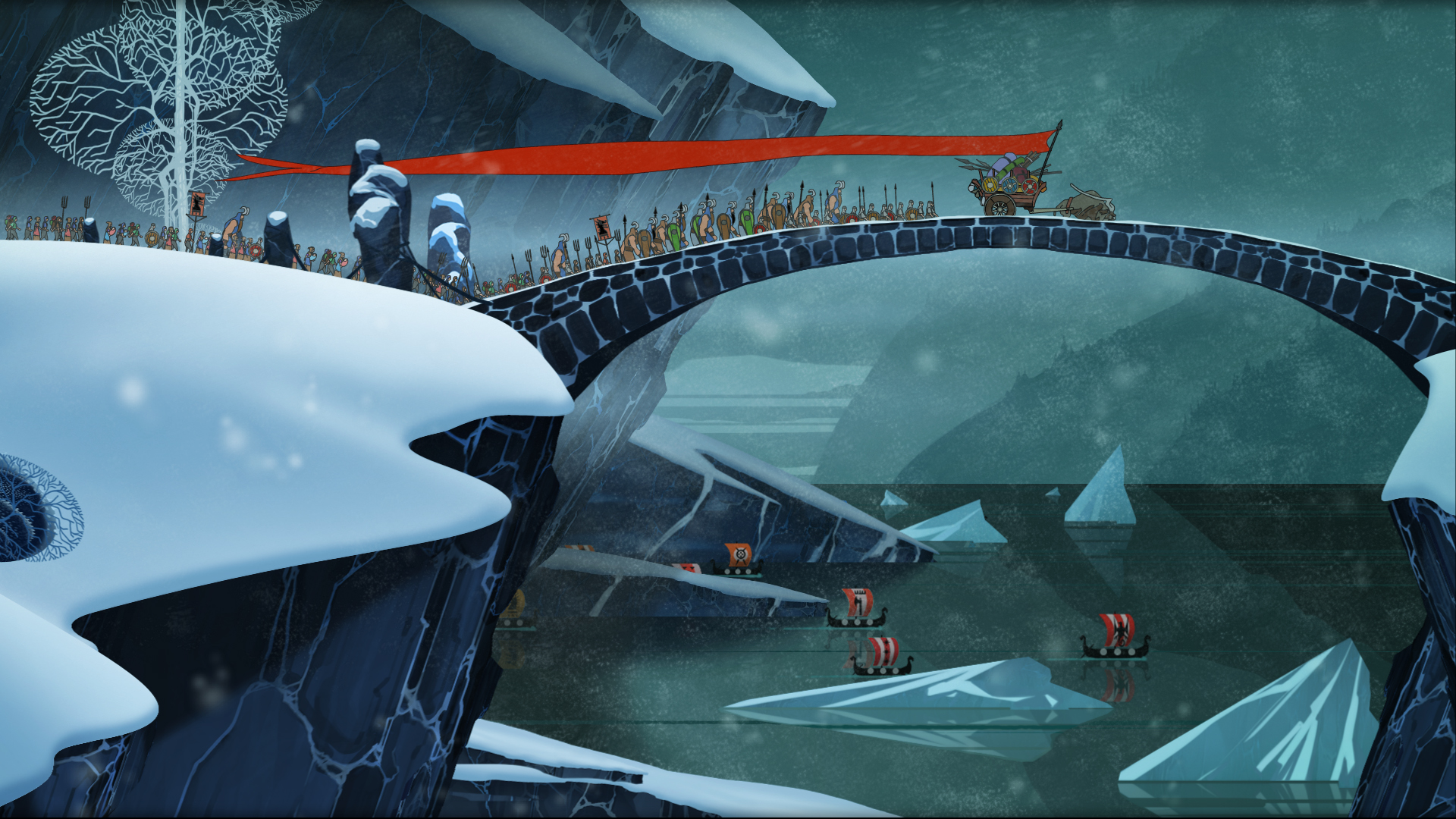
Concept artwork from the game

The game's developers – Alex Thomas and John Watson – left BioWare Austin after working on Star Wars: The Old Republic, with the intention of making a game for their own enjoyment, and which they thought other people would enjoy as well. They started work on the game in July 2011, with Arnie Jorgensen joining them six months after they left BioWare. After thinking up the concept of the game, they decided to make the game on their own, not wanting to be tied down by publisher demands and believing that it would be hard to convince them to fund it.

While Watson worked on the programming, Jorgensen handled the animation aspect and Thomas wrote the dialogues for the game with Jorgensen's input. In addition, Jorgensen designed the user interface, while Thomas handled the animation department before they could outsource it using funds from their Kickstarter campaign, and also designed the combat system. Another former BioWare developer, Drew McGee, later joined the studio and worked on the sidequests. Although the game was originally targeted for iOS devices, they decided to focus on Microsoft Windows and OS X instead since it did not perform well on the iPad in early stages. The team originally intended to release the game in Fall 2012.

The genesis of the game lay with Alex Thomas, who wanted to create a game that was a mix of The Oregon Trail, King of Dragon Pass and Shining Force since childhood. It was initially planned to be a medieval fantasy, but Stoic later shifted to a Viking-inspired fantasy setting, so as to avoid what the developers considered the "overdone 'elves, dwarves and orcs' dynamic". The choice for the Viking-inspired setting was influenced by Jorgensen, who grew up in Scandinavia and was impressed by tales of Vikings he had heard in his childhood.

The developers initially planned out the story, before proceeding to the gameplay. During the planning phase, Stoic decided to split the story into three games after being recommended to do so by the game developer Gordon Walton, hoping to finish the first one within a year. The game's main enemy called the "Dredge" were influenced by Shadow of the Colossus, and were deliberately intended to feel alien compared to the Nordic-inspired world. The race of giants called the "Varl" was inspired by the jötunn and mythical heroic characters. The inspiration for its plot about people trying to escape from the coming darkness meanwhile came from The NeverEnding Story.

When it came to the animation, Stoic decided to settle for traditional animation, of which Thomas was a major proponent. The visual style of the game is influenced by Eyvind Earle's art for the 1959 Disney film Sleeping Beauty, as well as the work of Ralph Bakshi and Don Bluth, The Banner Saga's art features primarily hand-drawn animation sequences, characters and backgrounds. It was selected by Jorgensen, who showed some images of Earle's art to Watson and Thomas for their approval. After coming up with his own art style for the game, Jorgensen started working on the map, which was drawn on a piece of paper. As he kept on adding more details to make it feel like a real world, Thomas would provide suggestions for areas to add in.

According to the developers, their aim was to create a "mature game for adults in the vein of Game of Thrones or The Black Company". They intended to engage players emotionally by allowing them to build relationships with the game's characters and shape the outcome of the story through an array of conversation choices. The team decided to allow the player to make choices only during specific moments like The Witcher.

When it came to the tactical combat system, the developers stated that they wanted to offer something that was unique, but not too hard for new players. Before they started coding, they designed the combat system with the help of chess. Games like Final Fantasy Tactics and Shining Force acted as inspirations for its strategic gameplay. Although the game's combat system was initially nearly the same as that of Final Fantasy Tactics, Stoic decided to create their own unique system after players who tested the game at Fantastic Arcade 2012 found it unwieldy. The movements of most of the characters are derived from that of the developers who filmed themselves, rotoscoping it later to use it in the game.

Stoic developed a custom game engine for The Banner Saga, which they internally termed "Yggdrasil", named after the world tree from Norse mythology. The engine was built using Adobe AIR, which although allowed them to easily port the game to mobile devices, also made it harder to port to consoles at the same time. The developers resolved this using Autodesk Scaleform, which according to them had never been utilized for such a large project before. The art was designed using Adobe Photoshop, while the animation was done using Adobe Flash, before being sprite sheeted and imported into the game engine.

As Stoic was developing the combat system for the game, they decided to release it as part of a free-to-play standalone multiplayer game to players so they would get used to the gameplay. This would be called The Banner Saga: Factions. It was also meant as a way to get feedback for the systems they designed for the single-player game and help promote it, in addition to earning extra money till the launch of the first chapter.

Stoic announced to the public that they were developing The Banner Saga in February 2012. A trailer for the single-player version of the game was released later in the month. The voice acting for the trailer was done by one of their friends at BioWare, while the animation work was done by Thomas, and the music made by Jorgensen.

=== Kickstarter ===
Although Stoic set out to develop the game using their own personal savings, they had intended to use Kickstarter to fund the game since they founded the company, being encouraged by White Whale Games, as well as the successes of Double Fine Adventure and Wasteland 2. Work on the Kickstarter campaign and a prototype build started in January 2012. While Thomas originally wanted $10,000 in funding from Kickstarter to outsource animation work, Watson convinced the others to raise it to $30,000 after finding that it was the most a project could make. After the success of Double Fine Adventure, they decided to raise the goal to $50,000, believing their initial goal would dampen interest. The announcement of the game further increased the reputation of the studio and they decided to capitalize on it by increasing their goal to $100,000, while fearing that the previous goal too might feel underwhelming.

The campaign was opened to pledges on March 19, 2012 and met its funding goal in the course of the next day. After the game was funded more than four times than its goal on Kickstarter, Stoic in April 2012 brought in music composer Austin Wintory to work on the game's music. In addition, Kpow Audio worked on the game's ambience and sound quality, while Powerhouse Animation Studios worked on the animation and the cutscenes. The additional funding also allowed Stoic to port the game to iPad and Linux. Meanwhile, the developers also hired three more employees to work on the game, including Jeff Uriarte who worked at Vigil Games, Brian Mumm who worked at BioWare Austin, and Leslee Beldotti.

The Kickstarter campaign accumulated $723,886 from 20,042 backers by the time it ended. This allowed the developers to expand the scope of events during travel, port the game to Xbox Live Arcade and PlayStation Network and add a full orchestra score by Austin Wintory. The campaign also allowed them to add back many of the features they had cut from the game originally. The game was later announced to be releasing by the end of 2012, with a public beta version planned for summer, and Stoic also stated that it hoped to port the game to PlayStation Vita.

As they began to work on the game, the developers believed that it would take them one year to complete. Though they planned to finish it quickly and spend as little money as possible, they found that it was draining their own savings quickly. While hoping to release the game on Steam, they also planned to sell it on their own if they failed to do so. Stoic begun talks with Valve Corporation to allow them to sell their games on Steam around January or February 2012. Later, they publicly announced to Kickstarter backers that the game would be released on Steam despite it not being certain. The situation however changed after the game was successfully crowdfunded, with Valve granting approval to them.

The game was later delayed to the first half of 2013 due to the additional development required after Stoic added in more features, a result of the Kickstarter campaign. The voice acting was outsourced to a studio from Iceland specializing in Old Norse after they were recommended to Stoic by a Kickstarter backer, partly to save costs, partly because the Icelandic language is the closest language to Old Norse, and also due to Icelandic accents being similar to that of other Scandinavian countries. They however settled on having the voice actors talk in English instead of Icelandic, particularly due to language accessibility and fearing that the players would not focus on the animation.

== Release ==
Stoic announced in February 2013 that the game would be released in the middle of the year instead. On November 8, 2013, a new announcement trailer was released showcasing the gameplay systems. Stoic also revealed that the game would be released on Windows and OS X on January 14, 2014.

On December 17, 2013, Versus Evil announced that those who pre-ordered the game would receive the "Insane Viking Pack" alongside Kickstarter backers. The pack includes an additional character named Tryggvi, who comes equipped with a pearl necklace which gives a character a higher chance to do double the damage in combat, and three tracks from the game scored by Austin Wintory.

The game was released with help from Versus Evil via digital distribution on Steam. Initially released for the Windows and Mac platforms, ports to iPad and Android were released in October 2014. A port to Linux was released in March 2015, and ports for PlayStation 4 and Xbox One were released in January 2016. A port to PlayStation Vita has been underway since 2014, but has been cancelled as of July 19, 2017.

== Soundtrack ==
Banner Saga - O.S.T.

Soundtrack album by Austin Wintory
- Released: January 14, 2014
- Genre: Video game soundtrack
- Length: 70:51
- Label: Reference Recordings

The fully orchestrated score was written by Austin Wintory, for which he was nominated for the 2014 Original Dramatic Score, New IP by National Academy of Video Game Trade Reviewers (NAVGTR). It features Malukah, Peter Hollens, Jóhann Sigurðarson and Taylor Davis as soloists. The ensemble that performed the music was the Dallas Wind Symphony, and it was recorded at the Meyerson Symphony Center in Dallas, Texas.

The soundtrack received critical acclaim upon release, and was nominated for a BAFTA Games Award in the "Best Music" category, "Excellence in Musical Score" during the 2015 SXSW Gaming Awards, "Best Original Score - Videogame" by Hollywood Music in Media, and "Best Original Score for a Video Game or Interactive Media" by the International Film Music Critics Association (IFMCA).

== Reception ==
Reception

Aggregate score
| Aggregator | Score |
|---|---|
| Metacritic | PC: 80/100 iOS: 92/100; PS4: 79/100; XONE: 76/100; NS: 80/100 |

Review scores
| Publication | Score |
|---|---|
| Destructoid | 8/10 |
| Eurogamer | Recommended |
| Game Informer | 8.5/10 |
| GameRevolution | 6/10 |
| GameSpot | 7/10 |
| GamesRadar+ | 4.5/5 |
| GameTrailers | 8.5/10 |
| Giant Bomb | 4/5 |
| Hardcore Gamer | 4.5/5 |
| IGN | 8.6/10 |
| Nintendo Life | 8/10 |
| Nintendo World Report | 8/10 |
| PC Gamer (US) | 82/100 |
| PCGamesN | 8/10 |
| Push Square | 8/10 |
| RPGamer | 4/5 |
| The Guardian | 4/5 |
| TouchArcade | 5/5 |
| USgamer | 5/5 |
| VideoGamer.com | 7/10 |

The Banner Saga for Microsoft Windows has an aggregate score of 80 out of 100 based on 74 critical reviews on Metacritic, signifying "generally positive reviews". The iOS version of the game obtained an aggregate score of 92 out of 100, signifying "universal acclaim".

According to IGN, The Banner Saga excelled both in its art and in its varied story full of meaningful choices. The reviewer also approved of the game's tough, but rewarding combat system and bleak, but beautiful soundtrack, while considering that the game could have explained key gameplay mechanics better. Eurogamer praised the game's art and elegant combat system, while criticizing the lack of variety in combat. Hardcore Gamer commended its feature-quality production values as well as its deep and engaging combat. Game Informer gave the game 8.5 out of 10, concluding that, "Despite a few minor issues with enemy variety and the tedium of recurring encounters, Banner Saga stands out as an excellent tactical RPG with considerable depth".

GameSpot awarded The Banner Saga a score of 7 out of 10, saying, "The Banner Saga is a beautiful game, filled with interesting ideas and enjoyable battles." GamesRadar+ gave the game 4.5 stars out of 5 and praised it for its unique aesthetic, interesting story, strong AI, and decision-making scenarios while criticizing the lack of a manual save function. Destructoid gave the game an 8 out of 10, calling The Banner Saga's battles onerous, arduous, plodding, and lethargic, while praising it for feeling like a game "made by artists". PC Gamer said that the game "ha[d] the weight and feel of an epic" while noting how its potential was weighed down by budgetary constraints. PCGamesN heavily praised the game's narrative, writing, "Stoic has still managed to weave a compelling tapestry of epic conflicts with emotionally engaging characters".

Dwellers Included awarded The Banner Saga Complete Pack with Survival Mode a 4.5 out of 5, saying "The first thing you'll notice when you start playing The Banner Saga is how beautiful this game is; from the characters, to the backgrounds, even the animations, every visual aspect of the game is absolutely stunning."

== Awards and nominations ==
Upon release The Banner Saga was nominated for over 30 awards, including three BAFTA Game nominations, two nominations from AIAS' 18th Annual D.I.C.E. Awards, three nominations from the 2014 Independent Game Festival (IGF), and four SXSW Gaming Award nominations.

| Year | Award | Category | Result | Ref. |
|---|---|---|---|---|
| 2014 | 2014 Independent Games Festival | Excellence in Visual Art | Nominated | |
| 2014 | 2014 Independent Games Festival | Excellence in Design | Honorable Mention | |
| 2014 | 2014 Independent Games Festival | Excellence in Audio | Honorable Mention | |
| 2015 | 18th Annual D.I.C.E. Awards | D.I.C.E. Sprite Award | Nominated | |
| 2015 | 18th Annual D.I.C.E. Awards | Role-Playing/Massively Multiplayer Game of the Year | Nominated | |
| 2015 | 11th British Academy Games Awards | Audio Achievement | Nominated | |
| 2015 | 11th British Academy Games Awards | Debut Game | Nominated | |
| 2015 | 11th British Academy Games Awards | Music | Nominated | |
| 2015 | SXSW Gaming Awards | Excellence in Art | Nominated | |
| 2015 | SXSW Gaming Awards | Excellence in Musical Score | Nominated | |
| 2015 | SXSW Gaming Awards | Excellence in Narrative | Nominated | |
| 2015 | SXSW Gaming Awards | Most Anticipated Crowdfunded Game | Nominated | |

== Sequels and other media ==
A sequel, The Banner Saga 2, was announced in December 2014. The game was released on April 19, 2016. A prequel novel titled The Banner Saga: The Gift of Hadrborg, written by James Fadeley, was released in April 2016. A miniatures board game, The Banner Saga: Warbands, was released in September 2016.

In January 2017, Stoic launched a Kickstarter crowdfunding campaign for a third instalment in the series called The Banner Saga 3. The game surpassed its $200k funding goal with $416,986 raised. It was released on July 26, 2018.

On July 18, 2018, it was announced that Hyper RPG would produce an official tabletop RPG tie-in show that would air on Twitch from July 24 to August 14 of the same year. It stars Shelby Grace, Andre Meadows, Steve Zaragoza, Dave Moss, and Trisha Hershberger, with Adam Koebel as the gamemaster.

An anthology novel titled The Banner Saga: Tales from the Caravan was released in July 2019.
