= Haraldur Ingi Þorleifsson =

Icelandic entrepreneur

- Born: 1977 (age 48–49)
- Other names: Halli Thorleifsson; Önnu Jónu Son
- Education: University of Iceland
- Occupations: Entrepreneur; businessman; philanthropist; musician
- Known for: Ueno
- Website: haraldurthorleifsson.com

Haraldur Ingi "Halli" Þorleifsson (born 1977) is an Icelandic entrepreneur, businessman, philanthropist, and musician. The founder of the company Ueno and the 2019 Icelandic businessman of the year, he sold his company to Twitter in 2021, then worked for Twitter until 2023.

== Early life ==
Haraldur was born with a genetic muscular dystrophy disease known as dysferlinopathy that forced him to use a wheelchair at the age of 25. His parents were Þorleifur Gunnlaugsson and Anna Jóna Jónsdóttir. In 1988, his mother was killed and his stepfather, actor Jóhann Sigurðarson, was seriously injured in a car accident caused by a drunk driver.

== Business career ==
In 2014, Haraldur founded the creative technology services company Ueno. In 2019, he was named the Icelandic businessman of the year by the Icelandic Association of Business and Economists.

In early 2021, Haraldur sold Ueno to Twitter. In the agreement between Twitter and Haraldur, most of the purchase price was paid as salary to maximize the tax he would pay for the sale in Iceland. Haraldur stated that he chose to pay for tax to support the school, health and welfare systems that helped him and other people from low-income families to prosper. As per the agreement, he paid the second highest tax of an individual in Iceland in 2021.

In March 2021, Haraldur helped launch a project called Ramp Up Reykjavík, a collaborative venture undertaken by local businesses, labour unions, government ministries, associations, banks, and city officials with the intention of helping local businesses install wheelchair ramps to improve accessibility for people with disabilities. After the project's success, a new project called Ramp Up Iceland was started with the intention of building 1,000 ramps around Iceland. After quickly building 300 ramps, the goal was raised, in November 2022, to 1,500 ramps by 2026. In December 2022, he was named the Icelandic Person of the Year by RÚV, the Icelandic national broadcaster, as well as Morgunblaðið, and Vísir.is.

In February 2023, despite being on a "do not fire" list, Haraldur's employment with Twitter was allegedly terminated after an additional round of layoffs, although he received no confirmation. Following an interaction with Elon Musk on Twitter in March 2023, where Musk "trolled" him, Haraldur received confirmation from Twitter's human resources department that his employment had indeed been terminated. Following Musk's tweet alleging that Haraldur did no real work at Twitter and was using his disability as an excuse, Haraldur responded in a series of tweets covering his medical condition while criticizing Musk. Musk later apologized for his "misunderstanding of his situation" after a video call with Haraldur, and claimed that Haraldur was considering remaining at Twitter.

In April 2023, Haraldur confirmed that he had left Twitter.

== Music career ==
In November 2022, under the stage name Önnu Jónu Son, Haraldur performed the opening gig at the Iceland Airwaves music festival. On 9 March 2023, he released his first song and music video Almost over you from the upcoming album The Radio Won't Let Me Sleep.
