= Lara de Wit =

- Born: 6 June 1983 (age 42); Durban, KwaZulu-Natal, South Africa
- Origin: Sydney, New South Wales, Australia
- Genres: Video game music, anime music, classical crossover, classical, film score, pop, soundtrack
- Occupations: Pianist, arranger, composer
- Instruments: Piano, violin

Lara de Wit (born 6 June 1983) is a South African Australian pianist, violinist, arranger, composer and music teacher. She had been employed by Opera Australia until 2015, where she also worked as a répétiteur. de Wit is also widely known for her covers of music from video games, film and theatre soundtracks, and anime, featured on her Twitch and YouTube channels, called "lara6683".

In 2012, de Wit published her first album, Game On: 2 Player mode, a collection of piano and violin covers from anime and video games. The album was co-produced and arranged along with American violinist Taylor Davis. In 2014, de Wit started releasing a series of singles.

== Biography ==
Lara de Wit was born in Durban, South Africa. When she was still a child, her family moved to Sydney, in Australia. She started playing piano at the age of 6, encouraged by her parents after her kindergarten teacher suggested them about Lara's potential affinity for music. She began playing the violin at the age of 9. While in high school, she studied "3 Unit Music" and specialised in composition. After completing her AMusA in 1999, de Wit studied at the University of New South Wales and graduated with a Bachelor of Music.

== Career ==
Lara de Wit was the pianist/repetiteur for Opera Australia's touring company, "Oz Opera", for four years. She performed with the Australia Ensemble on several occasions and toured nationally with prominent "popular" and "crossover" artists. de Wit is also a very experienced accompanist, frequently performing for student recitals, performances and exams, as well as accompanying a variety of musical groups, including the Collegium Musicum Choir at UNSW. de Wit has over ten years experience teaching piano and musicianship, both privately and in the classroom. She has been the Musical Director for numerous musical theatre productions and a keyboardist in several professional productions, including a tour to China and Japan in 2011. She has been commissioned to compose original musicals for youth musical theatre organisations as well as directing and performing the music for these productions. She has also received several prizes due to her high-level performances. In 2015, she worked as a music teacher for an Australian high school, but quit in 2017 to become a full-time Twitch streamer, where she performs live to an audience of up to 900 concurrent viewers on an average day.

=== YouTube recognition and opportunities ===
Lara de Wit is passionate about music for video games (she received her first Nintendo console during her childhood), and decided to use YouTube as a "showcase" for sharing her appreciation about this medium. She started her channel on 18 February 2009, and as of June 2020, its stats are: More than 810 videos published, over 357.000 subscribers and over 49.000.000 video views. Recognition that comes with YouTube popularity provides Lara opportunities to showcase her talent:

- Early in 2012, she was invited, along with YouTube musicians Taylor Davis and Kyle Landry, to perform at the Electronic Entertainment Expo.
- In April 2014, de Wit performed, along with pianist Kyle Landry, at the "Movie Music Night" and "Anime Music Night" concerts, in Singapore.
- November 2020, Lara was invited to perform as a musical guest for The Golden Joystick Awards.

== Discography ==
=== Albums ===
- Songs of Christmas (2017) – with Taylor Davis
- Game On: 2 Player Mode (2012) – with Taylor Davis

=== Singles ===
==== Solo ====
1. Walking in the Air (from the movie "The Snowman")
2. Game of Thrones main theme
3. Let it go (from the movie "Frozen")

==== with violinist Taylor Davis ====
1. Fear Not This Night – Guild Wars 2 (ft. Malukah) (published 29 September 2012)
2. Assassin's Creed 3 Theme (published 7 November 2012)
3. Halo 4: To Galaxy (published on 9 November 2012)
4. Phantom of The Opera Medley (published on 27 August 2013)
5. A Whole New World (From "Aladdin") (published 19 April 2018)

==== with pianist Kyle Landry ====
1. Realm of Secrets (Kyle Landry's original composition)

==== with violinist String Player Gamer ====
1. 'Vamo' alla flamenco (from Final Fantasy IX)
2. Voices & Strings – feat. LadyGameLyric (from Final Fantasy IX)

This discography was compiled from iTunes, Loudr and SoundCloud.

== See also ==
- Taylor Davis (violinist)
- Opera Australia
