= The Elder Scrolls V: Skyrim (soundtrack) =

Music from the video game The Elder Scrolls V: Skyrim

The Elder Scrolls V: Skyrim: Original Game Soundtrack

Soundtrack album by Jeremy Soule
- Released: November 11, 2011
- Genres: Video game music, Classical music, Nordic folk music, plainchant
- Length: 3:35:44
- Language: Dragon-tongue
- Label: Bethesda Softworks
- Producers: Jeremy Soule; Todd Howard; Mark Lampert

Jeremy Soule chronology
Dead Rising 2 (Original Soundtrack) (2010)	The Elder Scrolls V: Skyrim: Original Game Soundtrack (2011)	Deep Black Soundtrack (2012)

The Elder Scrolls series soundtracks chronology
The Elder Scrolls IV: Oblivion: Original Game Soundtrack (2006)	The Elder Scrolls V: Skyrim: Original Game Soundtrack (2011)	The Elder Scrolls Online: Original Game Soundtrack (2014)

The Elder Scrolls V: Skyrim: Original Game Soundtrack is the soundtrack album for the 2011 role-playing video game The Elder Scrolls V: Skyrim from Bethesda Softworks, composed by Jeremy Soule. Soule composed the soundtracks for the previous two games in The Elder Scrolls series, Morrowind and Oblivion, and re-used some motifs from those scores in his compositions for Skyrim. The soundtrack was lauded by audiences and critics and was ranked among the best game soundtracks of the year. The game theme song, "Dragonborn", featuring lyrics in a fictional dragon language, was particularly noted.

== Composition and style ==
For this game, Skyrim director Todd Howard wanted the soundtrack to shift away from the melodic tunes from the previous two games in the series and instead go in a more aggressive direction. Writing for Game Rant, Emma Majoris says that "Soule understood the assignment perfectly" and managed to stray further and further from traditional methods while tying non-melodic components together with hints of musicality. Majoris said that it is clear that Soule is an old-school composer who takes inspiration from masters in the past, in particular Tchaikovsky, and brings them into the present to mix with his own electroacoustic style. For the game's now-famous theme song, Howard envisioned a choir of chanting barbarians. The game's writer and soundtrack's lyricist, Emil Pagliarulo, invented a fictional dragon language, Dragon-tongue, and the "barbarian" choir sings in this language in unison. Per Howard's request, Pagliarulo constructed the language so that the song would rhyme in both Dragon-tongue and, when translated, in English. Emily Reese of YourClassical writes that Soule used both live and synthetic instruments to blend plainchant, Nordic folk music, and classical tradition to create a highly expressive soundtrack for the game world. Michiel Kamp and Mark Sweeney found that Soule's work is reminiscent of Nordic composers such as Edvard Grieg and Jean Sibelius, specifically in two ways: First, the Nordic countries these composers sought to represent in their work is the model for the land of Skyrim and its inhabitants, the Nords, and second, that Soule's attempt to render natural landscape sonically is similar to Grieg's efforts to do the same. Kotaku's Kirk Hamilton noted that much of Soule's work recalls that of Ottorino Respighi.

Soule incorporated motifs from compositions for previous Elder Scrolls games, for instance on "Dragonborn" - which borrows from "Nerevar Rising" from Morrowind as well as elements from music in Oblivion (portions of "Dragonborn" even being essentially an orchestral and choral arrangement of "Nerevar Rising" rather than a variation on it), "Unbroken Road"- the string melody of which is also heard in Oblivion, "The Jerall Mountains" - which also borrows from Oblivion, and "One They Fear" - which combines both the motif of Skyrim's "Dragonborn" with the theme from the previous two Elder Scrolls games.

In their review of the album, Josh Barron analyzed the composition of numerous individual songs from the album. "Dragonsreach" utilizes low strings, taiko drums, and male choir to "emanate power" and portray "masculinity". "Awake", opens with strings then introduces timpani as it plays motifs of the main theme. "Secunda" incorporates light piano textures and harp. "Distant Horizons" showcases dissonant strings and an oboe melody. On "White River", Soule uses French horn and strings to emulate rushing rivers and waterfalls. At 1:32, Barron found the piece similar to La mer by Debussy. "Death or Sovngarde", one of the combat cues for the game, features a full orchestra as well as a choir and is filled with brass chords and drum rhythms. "Blood and Steel" similarly features brass and drums for a bombastic sound. It incorporates motifs from the main theme and ends abruptly. For "Ancient Stones", a town theme with lighter textures and a joyful sound, Soule used pencil struck piano strings to emulate the sound of a dulcimer. "City Gates" features lower strings in contrast to the higher registers of "Ancient Stones" and brings in cello. "Solitude" features a soprano soloist and "Streets of Whiterun" features a cello melody. "Journe's End" consists of very lush, flowing orchestration, primarily of strings in a very classical form as used by composers such as Bach. The tavern songs differ from the rest of the soundtrack. They all feature a medieval music style and include instruments invented during the Dark Ages such as the lute and ancient flutes. "Around the Fire" includes a full ensemble of fiddle, lute, flute, and drums. Some pieces included on the album are short ambient or incidental pieces, such as the stumbling strings and percussion of "Caught Off Guard" or "Tooth and Claw" with urgent string and drum rhythms. "Masser", by contrast, is a long, choral-based ambient track. The final track on the album, "Skyrim Atmospheres", consists entirely of ambient sound effects. The ambient piece "Frostfall" features cello and other lower register strings as well as vocals which are similar to those used in Howard Shore's The Lord of the Rings. "Standing Stones" opens with an ominous male choral and suspended strings. At the 0:49 mark of the track, the dissonant strings contrast with female vocals. "Tundra" uses similar techniques and also includes Middle Eastern style instrumentation. "Aurora" is filled with contrasts, mixing dissonance and consonance, quiet openings and dramatic buildups. "Sovngarde" incorporates motifs from "Dragonborn" and opens with a male-voice Nordic chant. "Wind Guide You" starts off in a dark tone then changes to a simultaneously warm yet ominous sound through strings and choir.

== Reception and analysis ==
Professional ratings
Review scores
Source	Rating
Video Game Music Online	5/5 stars

Robert Ramsey of Push Square called the soundtrack one of the best realized soundtracks ever seen for gaming. Kirk Hamilton of Kotaku included the album among the best video game music of 2011. He wrote that the "soundtrack is bold and supremely confident, and is inextricably tied to the game it accompanies" and that more than any other game yet at the time the music made him want to immediately boot up the game. He singled out three tracks as his favorites: "The One They Fear", which reprises the chorus from "Dragonborn" and according to Hamilton "feels as shouty, Nordic, and flat-out masculine as anything else on the soundtrack"; "Secunda", which Hamilton opined feels more like a track for Minecraft than a Bethesda game and evokes memories of the first time Hamilton saw northern lights; and "Far Horizons", which Hamilton felt summarizes Skyrim more than anything else – in Hamilton's opinion, the song "perfectly captures the soul of Skyrim" and was the most iconic video game track of 2011. Kyle E. Miller from RPGFan wrote that while the soundtrack was not very original, it establishes and maintains an appealing atmosphere. Miller concluded that "Soule composes masterful music for wandering, and this could be the soundtrack for a winter hike or stroll across tundra-like meadows. Don't expect swelling emotion or fantastic melodies, and you won't be disappointed." He found the opening piece, "Dragonborn", the most memorable, but still highlighted several other tracks: "Awake," "Distant Horizons," "Far Horizons," "Sky Above, Voice Within", "Ancient Stones", and "Frostfall" as examples of Soule's perfecting the wanderer's soundtrack; "The Bannered Mare" and "Around the Fire" as pleasant, if perfunctory, inn songs; "Shadows and Echoes" as an example of the typical minimalist, bass-heavy dungeon tracks; "One They Fear" as a battle-song as well as an example of tracks which echo the main theme; and the final track "Skyrim Atmospheres", which encompasses the entire world of Skyrim and, at over forty minutes long, takes up the entirety of Disc 4. Shane Scarborough of EIP Gaming called the soundtrack "truly remarkable" and worthy of a blockbuster film. Josh Barron of VGMO rated the album five stars out of five. He said that while he knew he wouldn't be disappointed with the soundtrack, the music completely exceeded his expectations across three discs. He added that for those who enjoy sound effects and atmospheric textures from the game, the fourth disc is an additional bonus.

In the article "Musical Landscapes in Skyrim", Michiel Kamp and Mark Sweeney compared Soule's use of sound to 19th century interest in landscapes, arguing that the visual design of Skyrim blends with the musical scoring to create "happy accidents" that more closely resemble actual world experience with nature than is possible for any other visual media. They note that Carl Dahlaus's concepts of Naturklang – that is, a sense of stasis that, paradoxically, contains an inner drive created by ostinatos and a proto-minimalist rhythmic repetition of "cells" – and Kangfläche – that is, a "sound-sheet" which is static externally but internally filled with constant motion, where not only rhythm but unresolved harmonic notes (seconds and fourths) prevent the music from becoming "dull and lifeless" – he used to explain the music of Grieg also apply to Soule's work on Skyrim. In the main theme – "Dragonborn" – the rhythmic string ostinatos in the "A" sections of the track exhibit Naturklang, while the wash of string harmony in the "B" sections accomplishes Kangfläche. The woodwinds playing in the "B" sections are reminiscent of other static pieces such as the bird calls in Beethoven's Symphony No. 6 or the "Forest Murmurs" sequence in Wagner's Siegfried. Archetypal of both Naturklang and Kangfläche is "Unbroken Road", which combines the aforementioned elements as well as using reverb to enhance the slow pacing and impress on the listener that they are in a wide landscape. Both Grieg and Soule attempted to sonically depict the natural world. Exemplary of Soule's attempts at this are the inclusion of sporadic herding calls and woodwinds, the "pastoral" combination of horns and string accompaniment briefly found in "Awake", or the long, high-tessitura violin lines such as those in the theme for "From Past to Present", "which create a sense of vertical space." Horn calls are pervasive throughout the soundtrack because they perform two functions: The horn often accompanies the trope of a heroic, warrior-like culture, yet also is associated with pastoralism and the leaping fourths and fifths traditional to horn calls help create a sense of time and space. Kamp and Sweeney identified several elements that Soule uses as exploration cues in the game: String-based instrumentation with themes presented in octaves, extreme tessitura on string instruments and use of horn calls and melodies, harmonically open-ended phrases and cues with an ultimately static sense of a home pitch center, mixtures of diatonic harmony and "folk"/modal procedures, washes of harmonic accompaniment to create static harmonies, themes built up through repetition of smaller motifs and accompaniments based on ostinatos, only a few "main" themes with many subtle variations, reverb and long-held chord clusters, and ABA structure with "blossoming" A sections and contrasting B sections. These exploration cues contain elements similar to those used by Grieg and Sibelius, and are used to attempt the same as those composer - paint a Nordic landscape using music. Soule's cues tend toward stasis, as exemplified in "Under the Ancient Sun" but are also present in more cyclical tracks such as "Unbroken Road". "Unbroken Road", according to Kamp and Sweeney, also is more like a Caspar David Friedrich landscape painting or a Grieg tone poem than a natural landscape.

Iain Hart noted that the use of male choral singing throughout the soundtrack invokes modern imaginations of Vikings, which is overtly reflects the game music's Scandinavian inspirations and reflection of Scandinavian nationalist symphonic music.

== Concert performances ==
In 2016, the live music production company Senbla announced a partnership with Bethesda for an orchestral performance of music from the album soundtrack, scheduled for November 16 at the London Palladium. However, following that announcement, Soule posted on his Facebook page that he was not involved at all, and his scores were not being used for the concert. According to Soule, "For the record, this concert has nothing to do with me, nor are they using any of my original scores. They had to transcribe whatever notation they are performing by ear from the recordings. This is a flawed process as transcriptions are always fraught with errors." In commemoration of the 10-year anniversary of the game and accompanying soundtrack, an official concert, performed by the London Symphony Orchestra and the London Voices Choir, was performed on November 11, 2021, at the Alexandra Palace Theatre. A recording of the concert was released through Bethesda on November 12, 2021.

== Track list ==
All music by Jeremy Soule and all lyrics Emil Pagliarulo.

Disc 1
No.	Title	Length
1.	"Dragonborn"	3:55
2.	"Awake"	1:31
3.	"From Past to Present"	5:04
4.	"Unbroken Road"	6:23
5.	"Ancient Stones"	4:44
6.	"The City Gates"	3:46
7.	"Silent Footsteps"	2:51
8.	"Dragonsreach"	2:20
9.	"Tooth and Claw"	1:48
10.	"Under an Ancient Sun"	3:39
11.	"Death or Sovngarde"	3:00
12.	"Masser"	6:04
13.	"Distant Horizons"	3:52
14.	"Dawn"	3:56
15.	"The Jerall Mountains"	3:16
16.	"Steel on Steel"	1:42
17.	"Secunda"	2:03
18.	"Imperial Throne"	2:16

Disc 2
No.	Title	Length
19.	"Frostfall"	3:24
20.	"Night Without Stars"	0:41
21.	"Into Darkness"	2:52
22.	"Kyne's Peace"	3:48
23.	"Unbound"	1:32
24.	"Far Horizons"	5:29
25.	"A Winter's Tale"	3:19
26.	"The Bannered Mare"	2:28
27.	"The Streets of Whiterun"	4:01
28.	"One They Fear"	3:07
29.	"The White River"	3:29
30.	"Silence Unbroken"	2:21
31.	"Standing Stones"	6:35
32.	"Beneath the Ice"	4:12
33.	"Tundra"	3:46
34.	"Journey's End"	4:07

Disc 3
No.	Title	Length
35.	"Before the Storm"	1:05
36.	"A Chance Meeting"	3:09
37.	"Out of the Cold"	3:00
38.	"Around the Fire"	3:08
39.	"Shadows and Echoes"	2:18
40.	"Caught Off Guard"	1:10
41.	"Aurora"	7:18
42.	"Blood and Steel"	2:09
43.	"Towers and Shadows"	2:21
44.	"Seven Thousand Steps"	1:04
45.	"Solitude"	2:10
46.	"Watch the Skies"	2:16
47.	"The Gathering Storm"	2:51
48.	"Sky Above, Voice Within"	3:56
49.	"Death in the Darkness"	2:33
50.	"Shattered Shields"	2:38
51.	"Sovngarde"	3:35
52.	"Wind Guide You"	9:02

Disc 4
No.	Title	Length
53.	"Skyrim Atmospheres"	42:38
Total length:		03:35:44

=== Skyrim Vinyl Soundtrack (JUN/KUN Limited Edition) ===
All tracks are written by Jeremy Soule and Emil Pagliarulo.

Side A
No.	Title	Length
1.	"Dragonborn"	3:55
2.	"Under An Ancient Sun"	3:41
3.	"From Past To Present"	5:04
4.	"Ancient Stones"	4:45
5.	"The City Gates"	3:46

Side B
No.	Title	Length
6.	"Dragonsreach"	2:20
7.	"Sky Above, Voice Within"	3:56
8.	"Solitude"	2:10
9.	"Aurora"	7:21
10.	"Far Horizons"	5:31
Total length:		42:29

=== Elder Scrolls V: Skyrim - Ultimate Edition ===
All music by Jeremy Soule and all lyrics Emil Pagliarulo

Side A
No.	Title	Length
1.	"Dragonborn"	3:56
2.	"Awake"	1:30
3.	"From Past to Present"	5:03
4.	"Unbroken Road"	6:21
5.	"Ancient Stones"	4:42
6.	"The City Gates"	3:45
7.	"Silent Footsteps"	2:50

Side B
No.	Title	Length
8.	"Dragonsreach"	2:19
9.	"Tooth and Claw"	1:47
10.	"Under an Ancient Sun"	3:35
11.	"Death or Sovngarde"	2:57
12.	"Masser"	6:04
13.	"Distant Horizons"	3:50
14.	"Dawn"	3:56
15.	"The Jerall Mountains"	3:15

Side C
No.	Title	Length
16.	"Steel on Steel"	1:41
17.	"Secunda"	2:03
18.	"Imperial Throne"	2:15
19.	"Frostfall"	3:22
20.	"Night Without Stars"	0:41
21.	"Into Darkness"	2:50
22.	"Kyne's Peace"	3:47
23.	"Unbound"	1:32
24.	"Far Horizons"	5:28

Side D
No.	Title	Length
25.	"A Winter's Tale"	3:19
26.	"The Bannered Mare"	2:25
27.	"The Streets of Whiterun"	4:01
28.	"One They Fear"	3:08
29.	"The White River"	3:28
30.	"Silence Unbroken"	2:20
31.	"Standing Stones"	6:37

Side E
No.	Title	Length
32.	"Beneath the Ice"	4:12
33.	"Tundra"	3:46
34.	"Journey's End"	4:07
35.	"Before the Storm"	1:03
36.	"A Chance Meeting"	3:10
37.	"Out of the Cold"	3:01
38.	"Around the Fire"	3:09
39.	"Shadows and Echoes"	2:18

Side F
No.	Title	Length
40.	"Caught Off Guard"	1:10
41.	"Aurora"	7:18
42.	"Blood and Steel"	2:09
43.	"Towers and Shadows"	2:21
44.	"Seven Thousand Steps"	1:05
45.	"Solitude"	2:10
46.	"Watch the Skies"	2:16
47.	"The Gathering Storm"	2:53
48.	"Sky Above, Voice Within"	3:56

Side G
No.	Title	Length
49.	"Death in the Darkness"	2:36
50.	"Shattered Shields"	2:38
51.	"Sovngarde"	3:33
52.	"Wind Guide You"	9:02
Total length:		2:52:40

Side H

BLANK/ETCHED

=== The Elder Scrolls V: Skyrim - Atmospheres ===
All music is composed by Jeremy Soule.

Side A
No.	Title	Length
1.	"Skyrim Atmospheres Part 1"	21:27

Side B
No.	Title	Length
2.	"Skyrim Atmospheres Part 2"	21:33
Total length:		43:10

== Release history ==
Release formats for The Elder Scrolls V: Skyrim: Original Game Soundtrack
Region	Date	Label	Format	Catalog
United States	November 11, 2011	Bethesda Softworks	box set CD; digital	
United States	January 31, 2013	Bethesda	digital; streaming	
United States	August 20, 2018	iam8bit; Bethesda	double LP	8BIT-8083
United States	October 3, 2017	Spacelab9; Bethesda	box set LP	SL9-2040-1-9
Australia; New Zealand	November 17, 2017	Spacelab9; Bethesda	box set LP	SL9-2040-1-9
United States; Canada	November 24, 2017	Spacelab9; Bethesda	LP	SL9-2045-1-4
United States; Canada	2019	Spacelab9; Bethesda	LP	SL9-2045-NYCC
United States; Canada	2019	Spacelab9; Bethesda	LP	SL9-2045-Ebay
United States	October 3, 2019	Spacelab9; Bethesda	box set LP	SL9-2040_OC
United States	2020	Spacelab9; Bethesda	box set LP	SL9-2040-1-9-CLR
Europe	September 18, 2020	Spacelab9; Bethesda	box set LP	SL9-2040-1-9
United States	July 2020	Spacelab9; Bethesda	box set LP	SL9-2040_GT
United States	December 3, 2020	Spacelab9; Bethesda	box set LP	SL9-2040_GS
United States	2021	Spacelab9; Bethesda	box set LP	SL9-2040_GSI
United States	2021	Spacelab9; Bethesda	box set LP	SL9-2040_DB
Australia	August 1, 2021	Spacelab9; Bethesda	box set LP	
