= The Banner Saga: Factions =

Tactical role-playing multiplayer video game

- Developer: Stoic
- Publisher: Versus Evil
- Designer: Alex Thomas
- Programmer: John Watson
- Artist: Arnie Jorgensen
- Writer: Alex Thomas
- Composer: Austin Wintory
- Series: The Banner Saga
- Platforms: Microsoft Windows; OS X
- Release: February 25, 2013
- Genre: Tactical role-playing
- Mode: Multiplayer

The Banner Saga: Factions is a free-to-play multiplayer fantasy tactical role-playing video game, developed by Stoic as a spinoff of The Banner Saga and published by Versus Evil. It was released for personal computers in 2013.

The game was the debut title of Stoic Studio, which was founded by three former BioWare designers. It was conceived when they were designing the combat for The Banner Saga, and they decided to release it for free as a standalone multiplayer game so players could get familiar with it.

The game received mixed reviews upon launch. Its servers were shut down in February 2021, with Stoic stating that they could not afford to support it anymore.

== Gameplay ==
The Banner Saga: Factions allows players to pit teams of six combatants, chosen from 16 classes, against each other on a grid. Players make their units take actions like movement or attack in alternating turns. All units can be renamed by the player. The player can also buy new characters from the "Mead House" building or upgrade their statistics using an in-game currency called "Renown", which can be earned through matches or bought through microtransactions. There are four base classes, each upgradeable to three different classes. Renown can also be used to expand the barracks, which allows the player to increase the maximum number of units they can have.

Player characters consist of two races, which are the humans and the Varl. Humans make up the base classes of archer and raider, while taking up 1 tile on the combat board. An archer deals damage using a bow and arrow, although she has lesser health than other units. The raider uses a melee weapon and shield, which allows him to increase the points of armor of any ally standing next to him. The Varls meanwhile make up the base classes of warrior and shieldbangers, and take up 4 tiles of space. A warrior deals heavier damage compared to other classes, although having slower mobility than other units, while the shieldbanger has a high amount of armor and deals a lower amount of damage compared to the warrior.

Each character in the game has particular statistics called Strength, Armor, Willpower, Exertion and Break. Strength counts both as a character's health and the points of damage they can deal to another character's health, while Armor reduces the damage taken to strength. Willpower allows a character to move further or hit harder than they normally would, in addition to using special abilities. It can be regenerated to an extent by not having a unit take any action during its turn. Exertion is used to determine how much willpower a character can use, while Break is the amount of damage they can inflict on an opponent's Armor. When characters reach the maximum level of five, they can be "promoted", which resets all of their statistics to default, while upgrading their abilities and increasing the limit of a particular statistic.

The game's matching system pits opponents based on their ability, character power level and experience. Each player has a limited amount of time to position their combatants before the battle begins. Players can also participate in tournaments and ascend through the ranking ladder by winning matches. Tournaments require the player to spend "Renown" to take part.

Cosmetic items can be purchased from the in-game cash shop. Banners for displaying in the game and during matches can be purchased from the weaver's hut through "Renown", with players being able to choose their backgrounds and guild crests. They can also sew the achievements they earn on the banners.

The game uses the city of Strand as its main user interface, with players selecting different buildings where they can upgrade their characters, see their achievements, buy new characters, among other functionalities. Additionally, Stoic had stated that the city would evolve as the story progressed. Those who play the single-player games can also use characters from them in the multiplayer.

A beginner player goes through a combat tutorial which includes a cutscene, and is actually taken from the single-player game. Players are also offered "basic" and "advanced" video tutorials explaining the combat.

== Development ==
Two of the game's developers, Alex Thomas and John Watson, left BioWare Austin after working on Star Wars: The Old Republic, wanting to make a game for their own enjoyment and something other players would like. They started working on it in July 2011, with Arnie Jorgensen joining them later as well. This became The Banner Saga.

The multiplayer version of the game came about when Stoic was developing the single-player campaign. As they developed the combat system, they decided to release it as part of a free-to-play standalone multiplayer game to players so they would get used to the gameplay. It was also meant as a way to get feedback for the systems they designed for the single-player game and help promote it, in addition to earning extra money till the launch of the first chapter. It was originally intended to be released in Spring 2012.

The combat system of the game was designed with the help of chess, and is influenced by games like Final Fantasy Tactics and Shining Force. Although it was initially nearly the same as that of Final Fantasy Tactics, Stoic decided to create their own unique system after players who tested the game at Fantastic Arcade 2012 found it unwieldy.

During the release of the single player version's trailer, Stoic announced that the multiplayer version would be released for free through digital distribution platforms in summer 2012. The additional funding from Kickstarter for The Banner Saga allowed the developers to add city building as a feature into the multiplayer game. Its name was publicly revealed on September 15, 2012, as The Banner Saga: Factions, and it was announced to be releasing on Microsoft Windows and OS X in early November. Versions for iPad and Ouya were also announced.

Stoic stated that the game would launch with 12-16 character classes, and they would support the game even after the third chapter of The Banner Saga was launched, while adding in new content from the single-player to the multiplayer like character classes and gameplay modes. The story campaign of the multiplayer was also supposed to progress as new chapters of The Banner Saga were released.

The open beta of the multiplayer was launched in late-November 2012. Although it was meant for backers of the Kickstarter campaign and given to them for free, other players were allowed access in exchange for a payment of $15 after Stoic received numerous requests for it.

== Release ==
The final version of the game was soft launched on February 18, being made available exclusively for Kickstarter backers until February 24, a day before its intended general availability. All purchased characters, player statistics and rankings were removed before launch. Backers also received a special jade green stone on their combat emblem.

Creative director Alex Thomas later announced that the multiplayer would not be ported to iOS, Linux or consoles as they wanted to focus on the single-player game. The game was released publicly for Windows and OS X through Steam.

On February 9, 2021, the game's servers were shut down, and it was removed from Steam. The developers cited having no time or resources to update the game, after one of its critical backend services was retired.

== Reception ==
Reception

Aggregate score
Aggregator	Score
Metacritic	67/100

Review scores
Publication	Score
Destructoid	7/10
IGN	7.8/10
PC Gamer	59/100

The Banner Saga: Factions holds a weighted average score of 67 out of 100 on Metacritic based on 5 critical reviews, signifying "mixed or average reviews".

Anthony Gallegos of IGN gave the game a score of 7.8/10, praising its combat system and the introductory narrative, while criticizing the microtransaction systems as character progression through playing was slower. Allistair Pinsof of Destructoid gave it a score of 7/10, criticizing it for slow pace of combat, lack of variety in the classes and abilities, as well as the microtransaction system, though praising its strategic gameplay.

James Archer of PC Gamer gave the game a score of 59/100. He praised its animation design, but stated that it tended to highlight the shortcomings of the game more. Meanwhile he criticized the slow pace of the combat during the later stage of a fight, as well as the slow pace of character progression, with progression through microtransactions not being much helpful in matches against skilled opponents.

The game was featured on an episode of Good Game: Spawn Point, with host Steven O'Donnell giving it an 7.5/10 score, while host Stephanie Bendixsen gave it 8/10. Both the hosts praised the art of the game and its tactical gameplay. Although Stephanie praised its customisation options, she felt that it was limited. Steven meanwhile criticized the long waiting times players had to spend to find a match.

Art director Arnie Jorgensen stated in September 2013 that the revenue from the game was enough to keep supporting it, in addition to earning a small amount of income for the developers. Creative director Alex Thomas in December revealed that it had attracted more than 150,000 players.
