= Dragonborn (song) =

Song by Jeremy Soule

from the album The Elder Scrolls V: Skyrim: Original Game Soundtrack
- Language: Dragon-tongue
- Released: November 11, 2011
- Genre: Classical music, Nordic folk music, video game music
- Length: 3:55
- Label: Bethesda Softworks
- Composer: Jeremy Soule
- Lyricist: Emil Pagliarulo
- Producers: Jeremy Soule; Todd Howard; Mark Lampert

"Dragonborn" is the theme song of the 2011 role-playing video game The Elder Scrolls V: Skyrim from Bethesda Softworks, composed by the American composer Jeremy Soule. The composition is Nordic-influenced classical in style and features a chorus singing lyrics in a fictional language, Dragon-tongue, that was created by Emil Pagliarulo for the game. The composition borrows heavily from "Nerevar Rising", the theme from The Elder Scrolls III: Morrowind, as well as elements from music in The Elder Scrolls IV: Oblivion, both of which were also composed by Soule. "Dragonborn" was lauded by critics and audiences alike. It is featured in orchestral performances and spawned numerous covers, many of which combine the song with an in-game, English-language composition "The Dragonborn Comes". One such cover, by Lindsey Stirling and Peter Hollens, holds the Guinness World Record for most viewed cover version of a video game soundtrack.

== Recording and composition ==
The director of Skyrim, Todd Howard, envisaged the game's theme song to be performed by a choir of chanting "barbarians". Emil Pagliarulo, the game writer, invented a fictional dragon language, Dragon-tongue, for the choir to sing in unison. Pagliarulo, as requested by Howard, designed the language in such a way that the lyrics rhyme will not only rhyme in Dragon-tongue but also when translated into English. The lyrics praise the Dragonborn (the customizable player character), who is prophesied to save Tamriel from the dragons using the dragons' own shouts. The song also recounts the return of the great dragon Alduin and the climactic final battle which banishes him forever. Thirty singers composed the choir. Multiple recordings of the choir were layered over each other to achieve the sonic impression of over one hundred voices. Soule incorporated motifs from some of his compositions for previous Elder Scrolls on "Dragonborn". The song heavily borrows from "Nerevar Rising", the theme for Morrowind, to the extent where portions of "Dragonborn" are essentially an orchestral and choral arrangement of "Nerevar Rising" rather than merely a variation on it, as well as borrowing elements from music in Oblivion. The opening combines rhythm from taiko drums with a string section and male choral chants. Horns then join and the choir assists in driving the melody. The harmonies from brass and strings give the melody a darker tone prior to a trumpet fanfare. At 2:09, the main melody is reprised, setting up for the Dragonborn melody.

== Reception and analysis ==
In Kyle E. Miller's review of the The Elder Scrolls V: Skyrim soundtrack for RPGFan, he found "Dragonborn" to be the most memorable and felt it "accurately establishes and conveys the tone of Skyrim before the player ever sees the world." Michiel Kamp and Mark Sweeney in "Musical Landscapes in Skyrim", compare Soule's soundtrack to 19th century interest in landscapes. According to them, Carl Dahlaus's concepts of Naturklang which he used to explain the music of Edvard Grieg also apply to Soule's work on Skyrim, including "Dragonborn". Naturklang is a sense of stasis that paradoxically contains an inner drive from ostinatos and a proto-minimalist rhythmic repetition of "cells" and Klangfläche is a "sound-sheet" which is externally static yet full of constant motion from rhythm and unresolved harmonic notes (seconds and fourths) preventing the music from becoming "dull and lifeless". In "Dragonborn", rhythmic string ostinatos in the "A" sections of the track exhibit Naturklang and the wash of string harmony in the "B" sections exhibit Klangfläche. The woodwinds playing in the "B" sections are comparable to other static pieces such as the bird calls in Beethoven's Symphony No. 6 or the "Forest Murmurs" sequence in Wagner's Siegfried.

== Cover, concert, and tribute versions ==
- Malukah gained international fame after her acoustic cover version, which combined the bard song "The Dragonborn Comes" with the main game theme, went viral on YouTube. Within two weeks of its posting in November 2011, the video had garnered two million views. By 2014, it had achieved ten million views. On July 30, 2017, she released recorded versions of the cover as part of her album The Dragonborn Comes. The success of her versions of the song led to Jeremy Soule planning a concert performance of Skyrim music in which she would participate and ZeniMax Media (the owner of Bethesda Softworks) requesting her to compose bard songs for Elder Scrolls Online as well as a tribute song for that game.
- "Skyrim (Main Theme)", alternatively known as "The Dragonborn Comes", by Lindsey Stirling and Peter Hollens, released in 2012. The music video for this version set a Guinness World Record for most views of a video game soundtrack cover, having achieved 64,461,976 views on YouTube as of March 8, 2017. Peter Hollens also recorded a solo version of the song.
- Headhunterz in 2012 performed and then studio recorded a tribute version of the song that included samples and remixes of both Soule's original composition of the song and Malukah's cover version. He also released a remix version, "Dragonborn part 3 (Oceans Apart)", featuring Sian Evans, in 2020.
- The related tavern song "The Dragonborn Comes", which in-game is performed by non-playable bards if requested (and for a small in-game fee), is regularly performed by Sabina Zweiacker and the Swedish Radio Symphony Orchestra.
- A live orchestral version of "Dragonborn" was performed by Orphei Drängar and Myrra Malmberg at the 2014 Swedish Grammy Awards. A recorded version of the song was released on the 2016 compilation The Greatest Video Game Music III (Choral Edition).
- Celtic Woman included a version of the song, featuring Gaelic lyrics in addition to Dragon-tongue, on their 2016 album Destiny and the accompanying tour. Dr. Christopher Bailey from Austin Peay State University joined the group for eight shows as a featured soloist.
- Leah released "Skyrim Theme (Dragonborn), alternatively known as "The Dragonborn Comes", in August 2017.
- The YouTube artist Jonathan Young released "The Dragonborn Comes" in November, 2021.
- In December 2021, the YouTube artist Alina Gingertail released "The Dragonborn Comes".
- Saltatio Mortis, in February 2022, released "The Dragonborn Comes", featuring Lara Loft.
- VoicePlay, also in February 2022, released "The Dragonborn Comes Skyrim", featuring Omar Cardona.
