= Taylor Davis (violinist) =

American violinist (born 1987)

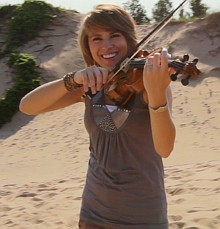
- Screen capture from Taylor Davis' video of "Wide Awake".

Background information
- Born: March 20, 1987 (age 39); Western Springs, Illinois, U.S.
- Genres: Video game music, classical music, film score, anime music
- Occupations: Violinist, arranger, composer
- Instrument: Violin
- Years active: 2010–present
- Website: www.taylordavisviolin.com

Taylor Davis (born March 20, 1987) is an American violinist, arranger, and composer. Davis is best known for her violin covers of music from video games featured on her YouTube channel "Taylor Davis", where she also features performances of her own arrangements of music from films and musicals. She also releases original compositions.

In 2012, Davis released two albums and an assortment of singles. Her seventh album was the first one exclusively with original music; it was crowdfunded, and the album, entitled Taylor Davis, was released in March 2015 and debuted at #10 on the Billboard Classical Charts.

== Biography ==
Taylor Davis was born on March 20, 1987, in Western Springs, Illinois. Davis started playing violin at the age of 8, while in elementary school. While in high school, Davis began playing video game music. Later, Davis attended Gonzaga University, where she worked to introduce video game music to the college orchestra and quartet members. Davis graduated from Gonzaga University with a degree in public relations, and a minor degree in violin performance.

After attending college, she intended to get into the profession of scoring music for games, films, or other media. It did not work out at the time, so she took a business job for a short period, while at the same time posting YouTube videos on the side (as a classically trained violinist). Davis worked as a PR person for a non-profit organization until November 2011; and then quit her job to concentrate all her efforts on developing her career through YouTube.

== Career and activity on YouTube ==
Davis started her first YouTube channel under the pseudonym "ViolinTay" on April 30, 2010.

In October 2013, the Critical Hit band's debut took place. This is a group led by Jason Hayes (keyboardist and composer of the World of Warcraft video game's soundtrack) and Michael Gluck (under the pseudonym "Piano Squall"). Davis joined the band in the same year, and the other band members are composer Adam Gubman, keyboardist David Paich (Toto's co-founder); violinists Michelle Jade, Caroline Campbell and Molly Rogers; bassists Carlitos del Puerto and Tim MacDonald; cellists Tina Guo, Ginger Murphy and Leah Metzler; percussionists Doug Belote, Joel Taylor and Kevin Dooley; guitarists Kole Hicks, Nita Strauss, Chet Stevens and Laurence Juber; pianist Salome Scheidegger; flutists Sara Andon, Shannon Canchola, and the "World Music" woodwinds-reeds-wind synthesizers specialist Pedro Eustache. The band published its first album in the same period.

== Personal life ==
Davis married her husband, Jarred, in 2011. They have two sons, born in 2019 and 2021 and a daughter born in 2025. They also have two dogs names Jax and Indy. She is a Christian.

== Discography ==
=== Albums ===
- Gaming Fantasy (2012)
- An Enchanted Christmas (2012)
- Game On: 2 Player Mode (2012) – Taylor Davis & Lara de Wit
- Legendary Movie Music (2013)
- Melodies of Hyrule: Songs from The Legend of Zelda (2013)
- The Anime and Game Collection (2014)
- Taylor Davis (2015)
- Odyssey (2016)
- Songs of Christmas (2017)
- Melodies of a Magic Kingdom (2018)
- Cover to Cover, Vol 1 (2021)
- Songs of the Lost Woods (2021)

== Awards and nominations ==
Year	Award	Work	Result
2015	"AudioGANG" Best Game Music Cover/Remix Award	"The Last of Us Theme – violin cover" (with composer Adam Gubman)	Nominated
