= The Banner Saga 3 =

2018 video game

- Developer: Stoic
- Publisher: Versus Evil
- Writer: Alex Thomas
- Composer: Austin Wintory
- Series: The Banner Saga
- Platforms: macOS; Microsoft Windows; Nintendo Switch; PlayStation 4 Xbox One
- Release: July 26, 2018
- Genre: Tactical role-playing
- Mode: Single-player

The Banner Saga 3 is a tactical role-playing video game developed by Stoic and published by Versus Evil for macOS, Microsoft Windows, Nintendo Switch, PlayStation 4, and Xbox One. It is the final installment in a trilogy of games that began with The Banner Saga (2014) and The Banner Saga 2 (2016).

== Gameplay ==
The Banner Saga 3 is a tactical role-playing video game featuring turn-based combat. The themes of the game are inspired by Viking culture.

== Development and release ==
The Banner Saga 3 was developed by Stoic, a studio founded by former BioWare employees. Following the release of 2016's The Banner Saga 2, Stoic expressed interest in creating a third instalment, noting that the fictional universe they created had plenty more storytelling opportunities. Speaking at the 2016 NASSCOM Game Developer Conference, Stoic co-founder John Watson, re-iterated their intention to complete The Banner Saga trilogy of games. He estimated the budget required would be $2M, and said that they had considered external funding.

In January 2017, The Banner Saga 3 was announced with the launch of a crowdfunding campaign on Kickstarter. The goal of $200,000 was achieved in less than a week, and the campaign concluded in March with $416,986 raised towards the game's development. While the majority of the funding would still come from Stoic themselves, Watson said that the Kickstarter campaign would also create a community of enthusiastic testers.

The game was published by Versus Evil and was released on macOS, Windows, Nintendo Switch, PlayStation 4, and Xbox One.

== Reception ==
Reception

Aggregate score
Aggregator	Score
Metacritic	NS: 83/100; PC: 82/100; PS4: 80/100; XONE: 88/100

Review scores
Publication	Score
Destructoid	8.5/10
Game Informer	8/10
GameSpot	8/10
IGN	8.3/10
Nintendo Life	8/10
Nintendo World Report	8.5/10
PC Gamer (US)	90/100
USgamer	3/5

The game received "generally favorable" reviews according to review aggregator Metacritic.

=== Awards ===
Year	Award	Category	Result	Ref
2018	9th Hollywood Music in Media Awards	Original Song ("Only We Few Remember It Now")	Won	
2018	Golden Joystick Awards	Best Storytelling	Nominated	
2018	The Game Awards 2018	Best Strategy Game	Nominated	
2018	Titanium Awards	Best Original Soundtrack (Austin Wintory)	Nominated	
2018	Australian Games Awards	Strategy Title of the Year	Nominated	
2019	National Academy of Video Game Trade Reviewers Awards	Art Direction, Period Influence	Nominated	
2019	National Academy of Video Game Trade Reviewers Awards	Game, Strategy	Nominated	
2019	2019 G.A.N.G. Awards	Best Original Song ("Only We Few Remember It Now")	Nominated	
