= The Banner Saga 2 =

2016 video game

- Developer: Stoic
- Publisher: Versus Evil
- Writer: Drew McGee
- Composer: Austin Wintory
- Series: The Banner Saga
- Platforms: Android; iOS; Microsoft Windows; OS X; PlayStation 4; Xbox One; Nintendo Switch
- Release: Windows, OS X; April 19, 2016; Xbox One; July 1, 2016; PlayStation 4; July 5, 2016; iOS; September 28, 2016; Android; September 29, 2016; Nintendo Switch; June 7, 2018
- Genre: Tactical role-playing
- Mode: Single-player

The Banner Saga 2 is a tactical role-playing video game developed by Stoic and published by Versus Evil. It is the sequel to The Banner Saga, and the second part of a trilogy of games.

A crowdfunding campaign for the third game in the series concluded on March 7, 2017, with 8,086 backers raising $416,986 of its $200,000 goal. A sequel concluding the trilogy, The Banner Saga 3, was released in July 2018.

== Gameplay ==
The Banner Saga 2 builds on The Banner Saga's turn-based combat, adding depth with the introduction of new units, new talents, new enemies, interactive objects, and new objectives. It also introduces The Horseborn, a centaur-like race. Several heroes from the original return as playable characters, and many of the choices made in the first game have a direct impact in the second.

In a 2015 interview with Rock Paper Shotgun, Stoic's writer Drew McGee noted that combat in the first game was often criticized as slow and lacking in diversity. The development team therefore prioritized creating new enemies and enemy types for players to face, giving them new abilities and buffs while also adding more win scenarios and variations in combat. The range and scope of choices available to the players - both in combat and in the overall narrative - has also been expanded.

== Development ==
The Banner Saga 2 is developed by three-man indie development team Stoic. The game was announced at The Game Awards on December 5, 2014. Initially, the game was scheduled to be released for the Microsoft Windows, PlayStation 4 and Xbox One in 2015. However it was later delayed into 2016. Windows and OS X versions were released on April 19, 2016, and PlayStation 4 and Xbox One in July 2016.

== Reception ==
Reception

Aggregate score
Aggregator	Score
Metacritic	PC: 82/100; XONE: 84/100; PS4: 78/100 iOS: 87/100; NS: 80/100

Review scores
Publication	Score
Destructoid	8.5/10
Electronic Gaming Monthly	9/10
Game Informer	8.5/10
GameSpot	8/10
Hardcore Gamer	4.5/5
IGN	8.9/10
PC Gamer (US)	86/100
Polygon	8/10
TouchArcade	4/5

The Banner Saga 2 received "generally favorable" reviews, according to video game review aggregator Metacritic. GameSpot awarded it a score of 8.0 out of 10, saying "Like the original game, The Banner Saga 2 leaves you holding your breath, completely invested in the world, its inhabitants, and their struggles, anxiously eager for more." IGN awarded it 8.9 out of 10, saying "The Banner Saga 2 is as beautiful and tactical as the first, but with greater variety in combat and story." Hardcore Gamer awarded it a score of 4.5 out of 5, saying "Not only does The Banner Saga 2 meet every expectation that one could have following the first game, but it exceeds them in a number of tangible areas."

=== Accolades ===
Year	Award	Category	Result	Ref
2016	The Game Awards 2016	Best Strategy Game	Nominated	
2017	20th Annual D.I.C.E. Awards	Strategy/Simulation Game of the Year	Nominated	
