= Ace Combat: Assault Horizon Legacy =

2011 combat flight simulation video game

- North American box art
- Developer: Access Games
- Publisher: Namco Bandai Games
- Composers: Go Shiina; Tetsukazu Nakanishi; Ryo Watanabe; Rio Hamamoto; Tetsuya Uchida; Kazuhiro Nakamura; Akihiko Ishikawa; Wataru Hokoyama
- Series: Ace Combat
- Platform: Nintendo 3DS
- Release: NA: November 15, 2011; EU: December 2, 2011; JP: January 12, 2012; Plus version: JP: January 29, 2015; NA: February 10, 2015; EU: February 13, 2015
- Genre: Air combat simulation
- Mode: Single-player

Ace Combat: Assault Horizon Legacy, known as Ace Combat 3D: Cross Rumble (エースコンバット 3D クロスランブル, Ēsu Konbatto Surī Dī Kurosu Ranburu) in Japan, is a 2011 combat flight simulation video game developed by Access Games and published by Namco Bandai Games for the Nintendo 3DS. Despite the game's international title outside Japan, it has little relation to Ace Combat: Assault Horizon, and is instead a remake of the PlayStation game Ace Combat 2. The original Japanese version features compatibility with the Circle Pad Pro accessory.

An enhanced version, Ace Combat: Assault Horizon Legacy+ (エースコンバット 3D クロスランブル ＋), was released on January 29, 2015, in Japan and in February 2015 in North America and Europe, featuring added support for Amiibo figures and updated control handling for the New Nintendo 3DS.

== Gameplay ==
Assault Horizon Legacy is a combat flight simulation game that is presented in a more arcade-like format in contrast to other flight-sim games. Its gameplay has been updated to fit contemporary Ace Combat gameplay, including newer features from the games released since Ace Combat 2, such as the high-g turn maneuver from Ace Combat 6: Fires of Liberation and the enemy ace squadron boss battles from Ace Combat Zero: The Belkan War.

Two new mechanics introduced in Assault Horizon Legacy are "Attack Maneuvers" and "Evasive Maneuvers", which simplify aerial maneuvers in a manner similar to Assault Horizon's Dogfight Mode. Attack Maneuvers require the player to stay as close to an enemy aircraft as possible to fill up the AM Gauge, and immediately position the player behind the targeted enemy aircraft. Evasive Maneuvers are performed to evade incoming missiles from any direction, and condense missile evasion to moving the Circle Pad left or right.

As in Ace Combat 2, the player can pay to have a wingman on certain missions, both returning from the original game: John "Slash" Herbert, who attacks enemies; and Kei "Edge" Nagase, who defends the player.

The game features additional aircraft not previously seen in Ace Combat 2, such as the Boeing F-15SE Silent Eagle and fifth-generation jet fighters such as the Sukhoi PAK FA.

== Plot ==
The plot of Assault Horizon Legacy is similar to the original plot of Ace Combat 2, featuring updated lore relating to its settings and plot events, including the series' fictional universe of Strangereal, where Earth has entirely different nations, geography, and history. The game's story details the 1998 Usean coup d'état, fought between the Usean Allied Forces (UAF) and the Usean Rebel Forces (URF) in the continent of Usea.

In 1997, two years after the Belkan War and two years before the Ulysses impact event, the nations of the continent of Usea, concerned about Osean and Yuktobanian expansionism, agree to form the Usean Allied Forces, an alliance between Usean countries. However, some countries in southern Usea consider siding with the Osean Federation after it offers to sign a military treaty with them, sparking objections and controversy. On May 30, 1997, the day of the treaty signing, conservative extremists in several Usean militaries, including some UAF defectors, the Lancer Squadron, the Cocoon Squadron, the Beast Squadron and the Albireo Squadron; engineered a continent-wide coup d'état, forming the Usean Rebel Forces. The Usean Allied Forces fights back, but by 1998, the Usean Allied Forces, suffering from defections and pushed to their last line of defense in the Twinkle Islands in southwest Usea, initiates "Operation Fighter's Honor", a counterattack led by Scarface Squadron, the elite mercenary fighter squadron that put down the Skully Islands insurrection four years prior.

== Reception ==
Reception

Aggregate score
Aggregator	Score
Metacritic	71/100; 63/100 (+)

Review scores
Publication	Score
Destructoid	6/10 (+)
Eurogamer	5/10
GameRevolution	3/10; 4/10 (+)
GamesRadar+	3.5/5; 2.5/5 (+)
Hardcore Gamer	3/5 (+)
IGN	8/10
Nintendo Life	8/10; 7/10 (+)
Nintendo World Report	8/10; 7/10 (+)

Ace Combat: Assault Horizon Legacy received generally mixed reviews, with Metacritic tallying up to a 71 out of 100 (from 37 reviews) and GameRankings 72.28% out of 25 reviews.

Nintendo Power awarded the game a score of 7.5 out of 10, stating "Ace Combat: Assault Horizon Legacy may not be a beefy adventure, but because virtually everything that's great about Namco Bandai's long-running series is present here, it's well worth playing". IGN awarded it an 8.0, praising it for "beautiful environments" and impressive 3D effects, but criticized it for a short campaign and lack of multiplayer.
