= Ace Combat 04: Shattered Skies =

2001 video game

- North American box art featuring the F-22 Raptor
- Developer: Namco
- Publishers: JP: Namco; NA: Namco Hometek; EU: Sony Computer Entertainment
- Directors: Atsushi Shiozawa; Hiroyuki Ichiyanagi
- Producer: Shigeru Yokoyama
- Composers: Tetsukazu Nakanishi; Hiroshi Okubo; Keiki Kobayashi; Katsuro Tajima
- Series: Ace Combat
- Platform: PlayStation 2
- Release: JP: September 13, 2001; NA: October 23, 2001; EU: February 8, 2002
- Genre: Air combat simulation
- Modes: Single-player, multiplayer

Ace Combat 04: Shattered Skies (Note: In Japanese: Ace Combat 04: Shattered Skies (エースコンバット04 シャッタード・スカイ, Ēsu Konbatto Zero Yon Shattādo Sukai).) (released as Ace Combat: Distant Thunder in Europe) is a 2001 combat flight simulation video game developed and published by Namco for the PlayStation 2. It is the fourth entry in the Ace Combat series, the first to be released for the PlayStation 2, and the first to feature the series' eventual main setting of "Strangereal". The plot, set in an alternate universe where Earth has been ravaged by asteroid impacts, follows the player character "Mobius 1", a fighter pilot in a multinational military coalition who spearheads the liberation of the fictional continent of Usea from the expansionist country of Erusea.

Ace Combat 04 started development as a reboot of the franchise, following the indifferent reception of Ace Combat 3: Electrosphere. The game was developed by "AC04 Project", a team of developers who previously worked on Ace Combat 3. Ace Combat 04 features arcade-style gameplay with elements of both realism and fantasy. For example, while the game has realistic flight controls and is set in the modern day, the player's aircraft can carry dozens of missiles in hammerspace and conduct difficult flight maneuvers such as flying through tunnels, and superweapons such as massive railguns appear in certain missions. The game features an 18-mission campaign and a multiplayer battle mode. A total of 21 different aircraft can be unlocked and equipped with a variety of special weaponry.

Ace Combat 04 was released to critical acclaim, with critics praising its gameplay, controls, plot, graphics, and music. Ace Combat 04 is cited as one of the best games in the Ace Combat series, alongside its later PlayStation 2 sequels, Ace Combat 5: The Unsung War and Ace Combat Zero: The Belkan War. The game was the highest-selling entry in the series until it was succeeded by Ace Combat 7: Skies Unknown in 2019.

== Gameplay ==
The player destroying an enemy aircraft

The player assumes the role of a fighter pilot through 18 story missions and a split screen versus mode. Each mission features different objectives including air-to-air combat, ground attack and escorting friendly units, along with radio commentary (recorded by real-world fighter pilots). The player's aircraft is armed with a machine gun and standard missiles that can lock on to air, ground, and naval targets. Special weapons including air-to-air missiles, air-to-surface missiles, rockets, and bombs can also be equipped, though their availability depends on the aircraft. At the end of each mission, the player is ranked on their performance and given credits to buy new aircraft and special weapons.

The player has the opportunity to purchase 21 different aircraft, both real and fictional, such as fighters, attackers, interceptors, multiroles, and air superiority fighters. Every plane has two alternate paint schemes that are earned by shooting down enemy aces hidden in each mission.

The gameplay is simpler and more action-oriented than other combat flight simulator games. The player's aircraft carries much more ammunition than a real plane and has infinite fuel. Multiple difficulty levels can be selected which determines the number of enemies, the AI skill and damage thresholds for both players and enemies. On easier difficulties, the player can survive several missile hits, while on the hardest a single missile can destroy the player's aircraft.

== Synopsis ==
=== Setting ===
Ace Combat 04 is set in the series' fictional universe of Strangereal, where Earth has entirely different nations, geography, and history. The story details the 2003 Continental War, fought between the Federal Republic of Erusea and the Independent State Allied Forces (ISAF) coalition over territory on the continent of Usea. In 1999, an asteroid broke into fragments that impacted Earth, causing widespread devastation and sparking an international financial crisis and refugee crisis. Four years later in 2003, Erusea, struggling with an influx of refugees and heightened international tensions, suddenly launches a massive invasion of the entire continent, including the neutral country of San Salvacion. Erusea also captures an array of anti-asteroid railguns codenamed Stonehenge and repurposes it as a long-range anti-air superweapon. ISAF is formed to fight back, but Erusea's strength and air supremacy from Stonehenge forces them to retreat to the island of North Point outside Stonehenge's effective range, allowing Erusea to occupy the entire Usean mainland.

The player controls silent protagonist "Mobius 1", an ISAF fighter pilot who leads the counterattack against Erusea. Other characters include AWACS SkyEye, an AEW&C operator who coordinates Mobius 1's deployments; Yellow 13, an Erusean ace pilot who leads Erusea's elite Yellow Squadron; and Yellow 4, Yellow 13's wingman and close friend. Cutscene interludes are narrated by a man from San Salvacion writing a letter to Mobius 1 after the war, recalling his childhood memories of life in San Salvacion's occupied capital.

=== Plot ===
Mobius 1 and ISAF repel Erusean bombers from destroying ISAF's headquarters, letting ISAF troops safely evacuate to North Point. Mobius 1 then takes part in a series of air raids to disable Erusea's "invincible" Aegir Fleet, halting Erusea's attempts to invade North Point by sea. Bolstered by their victories, ISAF planes strike deeper into the continent, but suffer heavy losses due to fire from Stonehenge. ISAF then launches a ground invasion of the Usean mainland, establishing a foothold on the continent. Mobius 1 gains a reputation as a promising ace.

Meanwhile, a boy witnesses the death of his immediate family when an Erusean fighter with a yellow-painted "13" tail number shoots down an ISAF aircraft that crashes into the boy's home. The boy is taken in by his uncle, an unemployed alcoholic who lives above a bar in San Salvacion's capital city, and earns income by playing music for Erusean soldiers in the bar. There he meets Erusean ace pilot Yellow 13, leader of Erusea's elite Yellow Squadron, and his wingman Yellow 4. Although the boy resents Yellow 13 at first, the captain and the rest of the squadron befriend and adopt the boy as one of their own. The boy speaks of Yellow 13's desire to face a worthy opponent and praise for Mobius 1's growing skill.

The ISAF invasion marks a turning point in the war against Erusea, and Yellow Squadron is hounded by logistical issues. The boy discovers that the barkeep and his daughter are agents of the resistance, though the daughter is fond of Yellow 13. The daughter bombs Yellow Squadron's airfield, damaging the aircraft flown by Yellow 13 and Yellow 4. ISAF then launches an attack on Stonehenge in which Mobius 1 disables the railgun array. Yellow Squadron scrambles to defend Stonehenge, but in the resulting dogfight, Yellow 4 is shot down by Mobius 1; her ejection seat, damaged by the airfield bomb, fails to operate, and she dies in the crash, devastating Yellow 13.

As ISAF forces approach San Salvacion, Yellow 13 catches the barkeep's daughter after she attempts to plant explosive detonators. The boy intervenes, calling Yellow 13 a "fascist pig". Yellow 13 is upset by the boy's words, but allows them to go free. As ISAF liberates San Salvacion's capital, the boy and the barkeep's daughter follow the retreating Erusean forces. ISAF forces push through Erusea's final defensive line to the Erusean capital of Farbanti. Mobius 1 spearheads the siege of Farbanti and engages and defeats the remainder of Yellow Squadron, including Yellow 13. The boy and the barkeep's daughter find and bury Yellow 13's handkerchief.

The Erusean leadership surrenders to ISAF. However, a rogue group of Erusean officers take control of Megalith, a superweapon that uses ballistic missiles to shoot down asteroid fragments in orbit, intending to use it to subject Usea to kinetic bombardment as revenge. Mobius 1 leads the newly formed Mobius Squadron into battle against the rogue officers while a special forces unit infiltrates the Megalith facility. As Mobius 1 flies into the missile ports to destroy Megalith's generators, the special forces unit opens Mobius 1's escape route at the last moment. With Megalith destroyed, the squadron celebrates Mobius 1's heroism as they return to base.

Many years after the war, the boy, now grown, reflects on Yellow 13's life and death. He finishes his letter to Mobius 1, stating his belief that the rivalry between the two pilots gave Yellow 13 "an unexpected joy, [...] at the end of that meaningless war".

== Development ==
Ace Combat 04's development began as a reboot of the franchise after the mediocre reception of Ace Combat 3: Electrosphere. This design philosophy was reflected in the marketing tagline "It's Changing Everything Again". Gameplay was given more of an arcade feel with an increased focus on score attack objectives and fewer story cutscenes. Studio 4°C developed the interludes that play between missions as slide show cutscenes, which was a cost-effective alternative to the fully-animated cutscenes in Electrosphere.

Development was led by "AC04 Project", a team of developers who had previously worked on Ace Combat 3. This team eventually evolved into Project Aces, Namco's dedicated development team for the Ace Combat series.

"Strangereal", the name of the fictional universe in which most of the Ace Combat series is set, originated in Ace Combat 04's development to describe the "strange, real world" created for the series' setting, that was left vague in prior titles. The term was used in Ace Combat 04's marketing and first appeared in a trailer for the game shown at the 2000 Tokyo Game Show. Though the term was only intended as a marketing phrase for the game's unnamed universe, fans began calling the series' universe "Strangereal", and the name stuck, being used in an official capacity in later releases. Internally, Project Aces uses the term "True Strangereal" to describe the specific version of Strangereal depicted in Ace Combat 04 and shared by most other mainline titles in the series.

As opposed to the Top Gun-inspired rock music in Ace Combat 2 and the electronic music in Electrosphere, Ace Combat 04's soundtrack features a blend of rock, orchestral, and synthesizer music, as well as a song featuring a Latin chorus, which cemented the style of Ace Combat soundtracks going forward. Sound director Tetsukazu Nakanishi designed the music to flow like a movie soundtrack. Audio was recorded from F-4s and F-15s at Hyakuri Japanese Self Defense Base.

== Reception ==
Reception

Aggregate score
| Aggregator | Score |
|---|---|
| Metacritic | 89/100 |

Review scores
| Publication | Score |
|---|---|
| Computer and Video Games | 8/10 |
| Famitsu | 33/40 |
| Game Informer | 8.5/10 |
| GamePro | 4.5/5 |
| GameSpot | 8.8/10 |
| IGN | 9.1/10 |

Ace Combat 04: Shattered Skies was a commercial success. By 2008, it shipped 2.64 million copies worldwide, making it the highest-selling Ace Combat game until Ace Combat 7: Skies Unknown surpassed it in 2021.

Ace Combat 04: Shattered Skies was critically acclaimed at launch, being given the Gold Hall of Fame award from Famitsu and listed as an Editor's Choice by IGN. On the review aggregator website Metacritic, 04 holds an 89/100, indicating "generally favorable reviews". IGN gave the game 9.1 out of 10 and Famitsu scored a rating of 33 out of 40 on release. It was nominated for GameSpot's annual "Best Story" and "Best Shooting Game" prizes among console games, which went respectively to Final Fantasy X and Halo: Combat Evolved.
