= Ace Combat Zero: The Belkan War =

2006 video game

- North American box art featuring two F-15C Eagles
- Developer: Namco
- Publishers: JP: Namco; NA: Namco Bandai Games; EU/AU: Sony Computer Entertainment
- Director: Naoto Maeda
- Producer: Hiroyuki Ichiyanagi
- Designer: Ryosuke Waki
- Programmers: Hiroki Odagaki; Yoichi Murakoshi
- Writer: Kosuke Itomi
- Composers: Keiki Kobayashi; Tetsukazu Nakanishi; Hiroshi Okubo; Junichi Nakatsuru
- Series: Ace Combat
- Platforms: PlayStation 2; PlayStation 5; Windows; Xbox Series X/S
- Release: PlayStation 2: JP: March 23, 2006; NA: April 25, 2006; EU: September 15, 2006; AU: September 21, 2006; PS5, Windows, Xbox Series X/S: WW: October 2, 2026
- Genre: Air combat simulation
- Modes: Single-player, multiplayer

Ace Combat Zero: The Belkan War (Note: Japanese: エースコンバット・ゼロ ザ・ベルカン・ウォー, Hepburn: Ēsu Konbatto Zero Za Berukan Wō; known in the PAL region as Ace Combat: The Belkan War.) is a 2006 combat flight simulation video game developed and published by Namco for the PlayStation 2. Part of the Ace Combat series, the Japanese version of the game was the last title to be released by Namco, and the North American version being the first game to be released by the newly formed Namco Bandai Games. Set in the Ace Combat series' fictional universe of Strangereal, the game's story takes place before the events of most other entries in the series, and follows the actions of "Galm Team", a mercenary fighter squadron led by the player character "Cipher", as they fight to repel an enemy invasion during the titular Belkan War, a World War II-esque conflict that was mentioned but not elaborated upon in previous entries.

Ace Combat Zero, like the rest of the Ace Combat series, has a more arcade-like format compared to other flight simulation games. Its mechanics are a mixture of features from its predecessors, Ace Combat 04: Shattered Skies (2001) and Ace Combat 5: The Unsung War (2004), with the addition of a unique reputation system that affects the player's progression and how the story is told.

The game received mixed but generally positive reception on release, with praise for its plot, graphics, and refined game mechanics compared to its predecessors, but criticism of its lack of innovation and melodramatic storytelling.

A modern port of the game was released as part of a pre-order bonus for Ace Combat 8: Wings of Theve in October 2026.

== Gameplay ==
The player firing missiles at enemy fighters

Ace Combat Zero's gameplay is split into a single-player campaign mode and a two-player versus mode. The mechanics themselves are a mix of features from Ace Combat 04 and Ace Combat 5.

The game features primarily older versions of fighter aircraft seen in its predecessors, such as the F-15C, F/A-18C, and several second- and third-generation fighters such as the Saab 35 Draken. The player begins the game with an F-5E, an F-1, and a J35J, but is able to unlock and purchase more advanced aircraft by completing missions and destroying targets to earn credits. The game introduces the fictional ADFX-01 Morgan superfighter (which resembles the cancelled PZL-230 Skorpion attack aircraft), but players can also access the ADF-01 FALKEN from Ace Combat 2 (the Morgan's successor) and the X-02 Wyvern from Ace Combat 04.

The game revives Ace Combat 04's aircraft customization system. Players can purchase up to three special weapons per plane (including air-to-surface missiles and thermobaric bombs), but can only choose one per mission. Another returning feature from Ace Combat 04 is the ability to withdraw from the battlefield to re-arm at an allied airbase during long missions.

Zero retains Ace Combat 5's wingman command system. During most campaign missions, the player can issue orders to the AI wingman using the DualShock controller's D-pad. The game also marks the return of the ability to pick each wingman's armament, though the ability to pick their aircraft itself remains absent.

The game continues the series tradition of taking on enemy aces who fly aircraft with unique paint schemes. Aside from pilots the player faces as boss characters, many missions have other enemy aces scattered throughout the game map; defeating them will list their unique plane and short pilot biographies in an in-game digital album.

=== Ace Style ===
A unique element of Ace Combat Zero is the Ace Style system, a reputation system that greatly affects gameplay. The player's Ace Style is affected by the player's actions during the campaign; for example, if the player shoots down a crippled aircraft, destroys a surrendering enemy, or attacks a neutral or non-combatant entity (all marked by yellow icons, as opposed to red and green for enemies and blue for allies), their Ace Style will change, as it will in a vice-versa scenario where the player spares them or simply leaves them alone. A horizontal bar with three boxes marked "Mercenary", "Soldier", and "Knight" is shown in mission debriefings, and depending on the player's conduct, the bar will slide toward one of these three boxes.

The player's Ace Style determines radio chatter, which enemy ace squadrons the player encounters, and which FMV cutscenes play. Different Aces earn different planes, and at the end of the game, color schemes representing each fighting style will be unlocked for each acquired plane.

- Mercenary Aces are pilots who destroy the opposition without mercy and are not concerned about their own allies. Players who kill all targets in a mission, hostile or not, and ignore allied support requests will see their ranking bar go left.
- Soldier Aces are pilots who can fight as circumstances permit and change the flow of battle. This ranking is achieved by destroying some non-hostile targets while sparing others, and accepting some requests for support.
- Knight Aces are pilots who believe in fighting fair during the battle and protecting the weak. Players can attain this ranking by coming to the aid of allied units and not destroying non-hostile targets, which will result in the bar going right.

== Plot ==
In 1995, the Principality of Belka, suffering from a severe economic crisis, launches an invasion of its neighbors on the Osean continent including Ustio, a resource-rich country formerly part of Belka. Overwhelmed by Belkan forces, Ustio's government hires mercenaries to offset Belka's military advantage, including Galm Team, a squadron consisting of elite fighter pilots "Cipher" and Larry "Pixy" Foulke (Yuri Lowenthal). The game's plot is told in retrospective, in the form of a television documentary about Galm Team and the Belkan War, broadcast a decade after the events of the game; the player's actions and Ace Style affect how the documentary is told and who is interviewed in the cutscenes.

Galm Team's actions turn the tide of the war and lead to Belkan forces being repelled from Ustio, while the international community forms the Allied Forces coalition to liberate Belka's neighbors and mount a counteroffensive to force Belka's capitulation. Now joined by Osean Federation pilot Patrick James "PJ" Beckett (Johnny Yong Bosch), Galm Team gains recognition for destroying Belka's "Excalibur" anti-aircraft laser installation, but Pixy becomes disillusioned with the war when they are ordered to support the indiscriminate bombing of a Belkan city. Unable to stop the Allied advance, Belka detonates seven nuclear weapons on its own soil in a desperate attempt to halt the Allied invasion, killing thousands of civilians. In the chaos, Pixy deserts Galm Team and attacks Cipher before escaping.

Following the detonations, the Allied Forces order a ceasefire and the Belkan government formally surrenders. Debates ensue among the Allied Forces over territory, and ultranationalist and anarchist defectors including Pixy form "A World With No Boundaries", a terrorist organization intent on erasing national borders under the belief they are the primary cause of conflict and strife; they plan to commit nuclear terrorism against nations to usher in their utopia. Galm Team is deployed to eliminate the terrorists, culminating in the siege of a fortified dam that houses a Belkan ICBM carrying nuclear warheads. Galm Team successfully destroys the launch control mechanisms, but PJ is killed by Pixy flying a laser-armed prototype fighter jet linked to the ICBM, which Pixy activates before challenging Cipher to a final duel. After a protracted dogfight, Pixy is shot down by Cipher, disabling the ICBM and ending the terrorist threat.

With the end of the Belkan War, peace returns to the Osean continent. Cipher is revealed to have completely vanished after the conflict, with no records of his personal information or fate. The documentary ends with an interview with a reformed Pixy, who had survived being shot down and is now a mercenary infantryman fighting in the Continental War. After musing on his experiences, Pixy thanks Cipher and expresses his hopes that they will meet again.

== Development ==
Ace Combat Zero was developed almost simultaneously with Ace Combat X: Skies of Deception (2006) and Ace Combat 6: Fires of Liberation (2007). Nonetheless, Zero is notable for being the only game in the series to be finished on schedule as of 2020: it only took a year for the game to go from conception to completion. Compared to Ace Combat 5, which director Naoto Maeda likened to a "Hollywood movie", Zero was envisioned to be "a memorable mini theatre film" with a focus on air combat and replayability.

Since the early stages of development, the directors decided that the concept of the game should be aerial single combat. To realize this, special attention was paid to the final mission to make sure the opposing planes would meet head-on, including making narrative changes so that the player can only destroy the enemy plane by shooting its air intakes from the front. Likewise, the title track that plays during the final mission, "Zero", was finished during early development once the theme of the narrative was established: a conflict over how best to bring about peace. Narrative director Kosuke Itomi came up with the idea to have the soundtrack be inspired by Spanish flamenco music, which both inspired and challenged music director Keiki Kobayashi. Because the game would be sold internationally, including in Spain, Kobayashi felt that the Japanese-made track "Zero" had to resonate in Spain in order to be accepted.

== Reception ==
Reception

Aggregate score
Aggregator	Score
Metacritic	75/100

Review scores
Publication	Score
Computer and Video Games	8/10
Eurogamer	6/10
Famitsu	35/40
GameSpot	7.9/10
IGN	8.8/10

Award
Publication	Award
Famitsu	Platinum Hall of Fame

The game received generally positive reviews. It holds a 75/100 score on Metacritic. As of January 2008, it had shipped 792,000 copies worldwide.

IGN's Juan Castro graded the game at 8.8/10, stating that Namco took a chance in slowly evolving the series, and that it offers "slight modifications" in the engine. He also noted the story as being different from other console flight games and praised the cooperative mode.

Computer and Video Games lauded the game's release date as a refresher from the multiple games of different genres that came out at the time. He noted the good graphical presentations and the sheer difficulty provided by the aces.

Eurogamer's Rob Fahey, however, said the game's "incremental" changes confuse players with what changed between Zero and Unsung War.
