= Ace Combat Advance =

2005 video game

- North American version cover art
- Developer: Human Soft
- Publishers: NA: Namco Hometek; PAL: Atari Europe
- Producer: Philip Cohen
- Designer: Róbert Tóth
- Programmer: Marton Szucs
- Artists: Róbert Tóth; Ferenc Szücs; Janos Der
- Composer: András Kövér
- Series: Ace Combat
- Platform: Game Boy Advance
- Release: NA: 22 February 2005; EU: 25 August 2006
- Genres: Air combat, shooter
- Mode: Single-player

Ace Combat Advance is a 2005 combat flight simulation video game in the Ace Combat series. Developed by Hungarian studio Human Soft, it is the first entry in the series released on a handheld game console and the first 2D entry in the series. Unlike other Ace Combat games, Advance was not released in Japan. It received mixed reviews from critics.

== Gameplay ==
Unlike the usual flight simulation games in the Ace Combat series, Advance is a top-down shooter similar to Strike, but using fighter aircraft instead of attack helicopters.

The game's campaign is divided into 12 missions. These missions are very similar to those in the rest of the Ace Combat series, with a few unique missions that require new tactics, such as "Spy Game", and "Finale".

== Plot ==
In the year 2032, eight years before the events of Ace Combat 3: Electrosphere, globalization has blurred the borders between countries, and megacorporations have become worldwide economic superpowers. One of these megacorporations, General Resources Ltd., uses state of the art military equipment and their Air Strike Force (ASF) to destroy anybody who could potentially pose a threat to their superiority. A new international military is created to fight back, spearheaded by an elite fighter squadron called the United Air Defense (UAD), which the player is part of.

== Reception ==
Reception

Aggregate score
Aggregator	Score
Metacritic	56/100

Review scores
Publication	Score
GameSpot	5.6/10
IGN	4.5/10
Jeuxvideo.com	8/20
Nintendo World Report	5/10

Ace Combat Advance received mostly mixed reviews from critics. The game was criticized for its lack of story and cinematics, repetitive gameplay, and lack of content compared to older titles.
