= Ridge Racer 6 =

2005 video game

- North American box art featuring the Soldat Meltfire and Assoluto Bisonte
- Developer: Namco
- Publishers: JP: Namco; NA: Namco Hometek; EU: Electronic Arts
- Designers: Hisashi Kawamura; Kazuo Yamamoto; Kenichi Shimada
- Series: Ridge Racer
- Platform: Xbox 360
- Release: NA: 22 November 2005; JP: 10 December 2005; EU: 20 January 2006
- Genre: Racing
- Modes: Single player, multiplayer

Ridge Racer 6 is a 2005 racing video game developed and published by Namco for the Xbox 360. It is an installment in the Ridge Racer series. Unlike the previous mainline entries, which were released for either PlayStation or Nintendo consoles, this entry was released exclusively as a launch title for the Xbox 360 in 2005, marking the series' debut on Xbox consoles, while a European release followed in January 2006 through a co-publishing agreement with Electronic Arts.

It is the last Ridge Racer game made by Namco as an independent company, as they would later merge with Bandai's video game division to form Namco Bandai Games in 2006. Ridge Racer 6 was followed by Ridge Racer 7 on PlayStation 3, a largely enhanced and expanded version. The game was added on the Xbox backward compatible list in November 2021 as part of the Xbox 20th anniversary, playable on Xbox One, Xbox Series X and Series S consoles.

== Gameplay ==
Like previous Ridge Racer titles, the focus of gameplay is on placing first out of 14 in numerous 3-lap races across several tracks and various cars. In most races, the player can earn up to three nitrous boosts by successfully drifting around corners without crashing, which can then be used to provide a short burst of speed. Some races are labeled as "no-nitrous", which prevent the player from earning any nitrous during the race, though nitrous can still be optionally enabled. If the player wins using this option, the race is considered complete, but noted for breaking the no-nitrous rule. Some races are also Duels between the player and a boss opponent, who is usually equipped with a much better car.

Ridge Racer 6 introduces a career-mode "World Xplorer", a branching-tree arrangement of races in which the player can only attempt races next to a race that has already been successfully completed. The layout of the races in the Xplorer is such that the position of a race will indicate what class of car can be used (horizontal position) and the difficulty of the course (vertical position). Rewards can be obtained by completing certain races or finishing all races that enclose an area on the Xplorer, and usually offers new cars, but also include extra variations of the tracks (mirroring and reverse) or new branches added to the tree. A player can also engage in quick races and time challenges for any track and car that has been unlocked.

Like other Ridge Racer games, this iteration goes beyond cars to feature other outlandish vehicles as well, called "special machines". These include a hovercraft (Assoluto Pronzione), a tripod supercar (Himmel 490B) and an oversized SUV that can be very loud (Danver Bass Cruiser). The game, as with all games in the Ridge Racer series, contains copious numbers of references to other Namco games, like Pac-Man, Soulcalibur, and Ace Combat.

There are a total of 30 new circuits available including "Surfside Resort" and "Harborline 765". There are also around 130 cars (including 10 special). Online multiplayer is possible with up to 14 players racing against each other and downloadable content was available through Microsoft's Xbox Live service. Players can download another player's "ghost" replay from Xbox Live and attempt to beat it. There are 15 circuits available, each of which can also be raced in reverse, making a total of 30 circuits. The circuits are split into 5 groups of 3, where the 3 tracks in the same group will overlap.

The game also features a FMV opening, starring series mascot Reiko Nagase. She is also featured in a hidden in-game message.

== Music ==
Ridge Racer 6 is the second game after Ridge Racer (PSP) to feature composers from both the older and newer game sound teams. Hiroshi Okubo served as the game's sound director, while the soundtrack also has contributions from in-house composers Keiki Kobayashi, Rio Hamamoto, Tetsukazu Nakanishi, Yuu Miyake, Koji Nakagawa, Junichi Nakatsuru, and Akitaka Tohyama. Several contractors who formerly worked in-house include the original Ridge Racer sound team consisting of Shinji Hosoe, Ayako Saso, Nobuyoshi Sano, and Takayuki Aihara, as well as Asuka Sakai and Kohta Takahashi, both of whom composed for R4: Ridge Racer Type 4.

Music from the previous two games in the series, Ridge Racer (PSP) and R: Racing Evolution, was made available for download through the Xbox Live Marketplace in 2006.

Due to high demand from fans, a soundtrack CD titled Ridge Racer 6 Direct Audio was released under SuperSweep Records on 14 January 2009. An extra disc was also included with purchases from SuperSweep's web store SweepRecord, featuring a DJ mix of its music by Yousuke Yasui.

== Reception ==
Reception

Aggregate score
Aggregator	Score
Metacritic	74/100

Review scores
Publication	Score
Edge	8/10
Electronic Gaming Monthly	6.5/10
Eurogamer	8/10
Famitsu	34/40
Game Informer	7.5/10
GamePro	3/5
GameRevolution	C
GameSpot	8.1/10
GameSpy	4.5/5
GameTrailers	6.8/10
GameZone	8/10
IGN	7/10
Official Xbox Magazine (US)	6.5/10
The Times	3/5

The game received "average" reviews according to the review aggregation website Metacritic. In Japan, Famitsu gave it a score of one eight, one nine, one eight, and one nine for a total of 34 out of 40.

VideoGamer.com called it the closest arcade racer on a home console, in both looks and playability. GameSpy praised the game's "killer graphics" and "great presentation", though it took issue with its stuttering framerate in split-screen multiplayer. GameSpot called it a slick, fast-moving racing game with solid handling characteristics. Conversely, Jolt Online Gaming gave a mediocre review. X-Play was more negative to the game, considering inferior to the other arcade racing titles, like Project Gotham Racing 3 or Need for Speed: Most Wanted.

In Japan, Namco announced that it expected to sell 500,000 copies of Ridge Racer 6 for the Xbox 360, although far fewer copies were actually sold. Ridge Racer 7 for the PlayStation 3 is largely an expanded and enhanced version of Ridge Racer 6. Differences include improved resolution and a more vibrant color scheme, new circuits such as Bayside Freeway and Shadow Caves, and vehicles that were not seen in Ridge Racer 6 like the Sinseong Jujak from Sinseong Motors, a fictional South Korean brand.
