= Keiki Kobayashi =

Japanese composer and arranger

Keiki Kobayashi 小林 啓樹
- Born: June 26, 1974 (age 52); Higashikurume, Tokyo, Japan
- Occupations: Composer, arranger
- Years active: 1999–present
- Website: keikikobayashi.com

Keiki Kobayashi (Japanese: 小林 啓樹, Hepburn: Kobayashi Keiki; born June 26, 1974) is a Japanese composer and arranger. He joined Namco in 1999 and worked there for 15 years before leaving the company to become a freelancer. He is most notable for his work on the Ace Combat franchise.

== Biography ==
Kobayashi was born on June 26, 1974, in Higashikurume, Tokyo. He developed a passion for music even before kindergarten and often sang with his older siblings – particularly his sister – while she played the electric organ. After graduating from high school, Kobayashi attended Toho College of Music, where he studied composition and sang in a choir. He graduated in 1997 and joined Namco two years later.

=== Work at Bandai Namco ===
Kobayashi worked on numerous games during his time at Bandai Namco Holdings. Within the Ace Combat series, his most significant contributions were the original soundtracks for Ace Combat 04: Shattered Skies, Ace Combat 5: The Unsung War, Ace Combat 6: Fires of Liberation, Ace Combat Zero: The Belkan War, and Ace Combat: Assault Horizon.

Kobayashi also worked on the soundtracks for various games in the Tekken, The Idolmaster, Ridge Racer, and Soulcalibur series. His final projects as a Bandai Namco employee included Mach Storm, Ace Combat Infinity, and Aces at Operation: "Digital Hollywood".

=== Freelance work ===
In 2014, Kobayashi officially announced that he would be leaving Bandai Namco. He founded cakeprojects, a production company under whose name he would release his future works. Since then, he has worked on games such as Super Smash Bros. for Nintendo 3DS and Wii U, among others.

In December 2015, it was announced that Kobayashi had been hired as the sound director for Ace Combat 7: Skies Unknown. In 2017, Ryo Watanabe took over the role of sound director for the game, though Kobayashi remained the lead composer. In 2020, he composed a track for the Final Fantasy VII Remake. With Ace Combat 8: Wings of Theve, he returned to the Ace Combat series as the main composer in 2026.

== Notable works ==
Year	Title	Notes
2001	Ace Combat 04: Shattered Skies	Music with Tetsukazu Nakanishi, Hiroshi Okubo, and Katsuro Tajima
2002	Tekken 4	PS2 version; music with various others
2003	Venus & Braves	PS2 version; music with Masako Oogami, Tomoko Tatsuta, and Junichi Nakatsuru
2004	Ace Combat 5: The Unsung War	Music with various others
2004	Ridge Racers	"World Touring"
2005	Tekken 5	PS2 version; music with various others
2005	Soulcalibur III	Music with Junichi Nakatsuru and Ryuichi Takada
2005	Ridge Racer 6	"World Explorer Introduction"
2006	Ace Combat Zero: The Belkan War	Music with Tetsukazu Nakanishi, Hiroshi Okubo, and Junichi Nakatsuru
2006	Ridge Racer 7	"Introduction"
2007	Ace Combat 6: Fires of Liberation	Music with Tetsukazu Nakanishi, Hiroshi Okubo, and Junichi Nakatsuru
2008	SoulCalibur IV	Music with Junichi Nakatsuru, Hiroyuki Fujita, and Masaharu Iwata
2009	Tekken 6	Console version; music with various others
2009	Ace Combat Xi: Skies of Incursion	Music
2011	Ace Combat: Assault Horizon	Music with various others
2012	Tank! Tank! Tank!	Wii U version; music with various others
2013	Tekken Revolution	"Fight in the Netherlands"
2013	Disney Magical World	Music
2013	The Idolmaster Cinderella Girls	"You're stars shine on me"
2013	Mach Storm	Music
2014	Ace Combat Infinity	Sound director
2014	Super Smash Bros. for Nintendo 3DS and Wii U	Music with various others
2015	Monster Hunter Generations	Arrangement ("Awakening")
2016	Star Fox Zero	Music with various others
2016	Street Fighter V	Music with various others
2018	Monster Boy and the Cursed Kingdom	Music with various others
2018	Super Smash Bros. Ultimate	Arrangement with various others
2019	Ace Combat 7: Skies Unknown	Music with various others
2020	Final Fantasy VII Remake	"The Valkyrie"
2023	Final Fantasy VII: Ever Crisis	Music with various others
2023	Final Fantasy VII: The First Soldier	Episodes; music with various others
2024	Final Fantasy VII Rebirth	Music with various others
2026	Ace Combat 8: Wings of Theve	Music with various others
