= Ace Combat Xi: Skies of Incursion =

2009 video game

- Developer: Namco Bandai Games
- Publisher: Namco Bandai Games
- Composer: Keiki Kobayashi
- Series: Ace Combat
- Platform: iOS
- Release: December 3, 2009
- Genre: Air combat simulation
- Mode: Single-player

Ace Combat Xi: Skies of Incursion (Note: Japanese: エースコンバットXi スカイズ・オブ・インカーション, Hepburn: Ēsu Konbatto Ekkusu Ai Sukaizu obu Inkāshon) was a 2009 combat flight simulation video game developed and published by Namco Bandai Games for iOS.

== Gameplay ==
An XFA-24 Apalis engaging enemy planes during a campaign mission

Ace Combat Xi: Skies of Incursion, which retains the core combat mechanics of the Ace Combat series, is a combat flight simulation game but it is presented in a more arcade-like format in contrast to other flight-sim games. The player plays the role of the flight lead in Falco Squadron, of the Aurelian Air Force. Ace Combat Xi does not have multiplayer capability.

The player moves the plane by tilting the iPhone upwards or downwards to maneuver to aircraft to climb upwards or dive downwards. Players can also tilt the iPhone sideways to turn the aircraft. Combat is done using the touchscreen where players can touch on the various weapon icons present on the screen to fire the machine gun or missiles armed on the plane, players can also target enemies by touching on the target icon on the screen. Players can also control the speed of the aircraft by tapping on the throttle or brake button on the screen. Throttling temporarily boosts the aircraft speed and will slowly decrease in speed once the effect has worn off, braking will slow down the aircraft though braking too much may result in the plane stalling and losing power. The camera can also be toggled between using a chase camera or a usual HUD view during gameplay.

== Plot ==
Skies of Incursion takes place during the same time period as Ace Combat X: Skies of Deception, however Skies of Deception tells its story through the point of view of Gryphus Squadron while Skies of Incursion tells the story from the point of view of the Falco Squadron, a separate unit in the Aurelian Air Force.

Aurelia, located on the southern edge of the Osean Continent, has lived in peace for many years due to its mild climate and vast underground resources, but in the year 2020, the country was invaded by the neighboring country, Leasath, under the command of Diego Gaspar Navarro. The invasion was under the guise of Aurelia supposedly promoting civil war in Leasath. Aurelia was caught vulnerable and was quickly defeated within a matter of 10 days, this was due to the overwhelming power of Leasath's advanced superweapon - the Gleipnir Flying Fortress. The true motive behind the invasion was only later revealed to be Diego Gaspar Navarro's personal profits in arms deals during the war.

The remnants of Aurelia's military, being reduced to a single operating airbase, quickly banded together to launch a last-ditch counter-attack against the invading Leasath forces to liberate their homeland.

== Development ==
The game was first announced for the iOS on by Japanese gaming magazine Famitsu in September 2009. The first playable demo of the game was showcased at the Tokyo Game Show 2009 at the Namco Bandai booth. The controls, graphics as well as functionality were highly praised by critics who played the demo. A number of screenshots was released by Namco Bandai to fans through their Facebook fan page.

== Reception ==
Reception

Aggregate score
Aggregator	Score
Metacritic	61/100

Review scores
Publication	Score
Eurogamer	6/10
IGN	6.8/10
Pocket Gamer	3/5
TouchArcade	3.5/5
VideoGamer.com	4/10

The game received "mixed" reviews according to the review aggregation website Metacritic.
