= Ace Combat: Joint Assault =

2010 video game

- North American cover art
- Developers: Project Aces; Access Games
- Publisher: Namco Bandai Games
- Director: Nobuo Tomita
- Producers: Kuniaki Kakuwa; Shigeru Yoshida
- Designer: Yuta Hamanaka
- Composers: Go Shiina; Kanako Kakino; Inon Zur
- Series: Ace Combat
- Platform: PlayStation Portable
- Release: JP: 26 August 2010; NA: 31 August 2010; AU: 23 September 2010; EU: 24 September 2010
- Genre: Air combat simulation
- Modes: Single-player, multiplayer

Ace Combat: Joint Assault (Note: Known in Japan as Ace Combat X²: Joint Assault (エースコンバットX² ジョイントアサルト, Ēsu Konbatto Ekkusu Tsū Jointo Asaruto)) is a 2010 combat flight simulation video game developed by Project Aces and Access Games and published by Namco Bandai Games for the PlayStation Portable. It is the second in the Ace Combat franchise to be released for the PlayStation Portable and the fourth for a portable platform. It is also the first game in the franchise to be set on real-world Earth.

== Gameplay ==
Ace Combat: Joint Assault is a combat flight simulation game but it is presented in a more arcade-like format in contrast to other flight-sim games. The game features both a single-player mode as well as a multiplayer mode supporting ad hoc and infrastructure mode. The game features a co-operative campaign which can be played with up to four players as well as a competitive multiplayer mode supporting up to eight players. Some missions in the campaign will make use of the Joint Assault Mission System, which breaks the players into teams and has them coordinate attacks where each effort can affect the other team's situation. A new feature of the game is the Enhanced Combat View mechanic, which removes the distanced fighting seen in almost every flight simulation game.

=== Aircraft ===
Joint Assault features more than 40 licensed aircraft types, plus fictional aircraft from previous installments in the series, particularly Ace Combat X: Skies of Deception. Propeller planes are also available for the first time in the series, with players being able to unlock the F6F-5 Hellcat and the A6M Zero. Frequent use of each aircraft allows the player to unlock more weapons, tune-up parts, paint schemes, and new emblems. The game's official superfighter is the GAF-1 Varcolac.

== Plot ==
=== Characters ===
Joint Assault is set between 2010 and 2011 in a rendition of Earth, as opposed to Ace Combat's typical fictional setting of Strangereal. Up to four players assume the role of Antares Squadron, pilots hired by a private military company called Martinez Security, assigned under the command of Lieutenant Colonel Frederick Burford. Another squadron within the company, Rigel, consists of pilots Milosz Sulejmani, Daniel Oruma, Faryd Gaviria, and Tolya Kiriakov. The game's antagonists are Romanian Colonel Nicolae Dumitrescu and international insurance businessman Andre Olivieri.

=== Story ===
During a military exercise involving Martinez Security, the U.S. Seventh Fleet, and the Japan Maritime Self-Defense Force off Midway Atoll, the international high-tech terrorist group Valahia launches a massive attack on Japan. Antares and Rigel Squadrons support the Seventh Fleet and the JSDF in the defense of Tokyo, the Izu Islands, and the Bōsō Peninsula, while also destroying Valahia's airborne aircraft carrier Orgoi and damaging their aerial battleship Spiridus. However, Rigel Squadron defects to Valahia upon accepting a lucrative offer by Dumitrescu, Valahia's leader.

Embarrassed by the defection, Martinez Security joins the International Union Peacekeeping Force (IUPF), a global coalition tasked with defeating Valahia, who are active in the Middle East and the Balkans. During a mission over the Adriatic Sea, Antares encounters Rigel, now calling themselves Varcolac Squadron. Antares manages to destroy Spiridus over London and the railgun emplacement Balaur in Romania, crippling Valahia's combat capabilities and leaving them without superweapons. After Antares One is briefly reassigned to fly major IUPF financier Andre Olivieri's personal Boeing 747-200B through Valahia-controlled territory, Antares and the IUPF assault Valahia's missile silos in Central Asia before they can launch nuclear missiles at North America and Europe, killing Dumitrescu and dismantling Valahia.

During the assault on the missile silos, Antares engages Varcolac and learns of the "Golden Axe Plan", a conspiracy formulated by Olivieri. An extremely wealthy insurance magnate whose company was on the verge of bankruptcy following the Great Recession, Olivieri secretly supported Valahia's attacks on major cities, disrupting the economy and scaring the public into buying his company's war risk insurance plan, with the goal of ultimately gaining a monopoly over the global insurance market and making him the richest person in the world. After the destruction of Spiridus, Valahia had betrayed Olivieri to pursue their own plans of forming a state.

While resupplying at Midway Atoll, Antares is attacked by Olivieri's private army and a fleet of new Orgois, but they repel the attack. Knowing the final steps of the Golden Axe Plan involve an attack on the United States, Martinez Security deploys to Nevada to defeat Olivieri's private army and destroys their improved Spiridus over Lake Tahoe. Olivieri's private army launches their planned attack on San Francisco, but are defeated by Antares, who also defeat Varcolac in a final duel. Antares bombs the entrance to Olivieri's headquarters, killing him and allowing ground forces to infiltrate the building and expose the Golden Axe Plan to the world.

== Development ==
The game was officially announced by Namco Bandai on 12 January 2010, although screenshots had been leaked a day before on IGN. The game officially went gold on 13 August.

== Reception ==
Reception

Aggregate score
Aggregator	Score
Metacritic	71/100

Review scores
Publication	Score
Edge	6/10
Famitsu	36/40
G4	4/5
Game Informer	7.5/10
GameSpot	7.5/10
GamesRadar+	3/5
GameZone	7/10
IGN	6.5/10
Pocket Gamer	4.5/5
PlayStation: The Official Magazine	8/10
Metro	6/10

Ace Combat: Joint Assault received "mixed or average reviews" according to the review aggregation website Metacritic. In Japan, Famitsu gave it a score of 36 out of 40.

GameSpot and IGN stated that the game's story was not as dramatic as those from previous titles, and its saving grace is the co-operative play options and the easy access to new rewards. GamesRadar+ cited the PSP's control options as a letdown compared to console versions, but lauded the Joint Assault system as an idea worth seeing in future games, especially with Assault Horizon.
