= Ace Combat 2 =

1997 video game

- North American box art
- Developer: Namco
- Publishers: JP: Namco; NA: Namco Hometek; EU: Sony Computer Entertainment
- Designer: Masanori Kato
- Composers: Kohta Takahashi; Nobuhide Isayama; Hiroshi Okubo; Tetsukazu Nakanishi
- Series: Ace Combat
- Platform: PlayStation
- Release: JP: May 30, 1997; NA: August 21, 1997; EU: October 24, 1997
- Genre: Air combat simulation
- Mode: Single-player

Ace Combat 2 (Note: Japanese: エースコンバット2, Hepburn: Ēsu Konbatto Tsu) is a 1997 combat flight simulation video game developed and published by Namco for the PlayStation. It is the sequel to Air Combat and the second in the Ace Combat franchise. The player controls one of 24 different fighter jets through 21 different missions with certain objectives to fulfill, such as protecting a base from enemy fire, intercepting a squadron of enemies, or taking down an aircraft carrier.

Conceived by Namco designer Masanori Kato, Ace Combat 2 was created out of Kato's dissatisfaction with the original Air Combat, feeling from a technical standpoint it was severely lacking. Along with a small group of others, Kato set out to create a follow-up that greatly improved on the original, featuring improved graphics, a variety in missions, and providing a true sense of flight for the player. Missions were created to be exciting and fun to play, with the gameplay itself being designed to mimic the typical style of arcade games.

Ace Combat 2 was a commercial success, selling over 500,000 copies in Japan by May 1998. It was commended by critics for its gameplay, graphics, variety in missions, and improvements over its predecessor. Some also called it one of the best flight-sim games on the PlayStation. The lack of a multiplayer mode and its high-difficulty level were the subject of criticism. A remake for the Nintendo 3DS, Ace Combat: Assault Horizon Legacy, was released in 2011.

== Gameplay ==
In-game screenshot, showing the player targeting a squadron of enemies. The player's fuel meter is shown at the top-left.

Ace Combat 2 is a combat flight simulation game but it is presented in a more arcade-like format than other flight-sim games of the era. The player controls one of 24 different fighter jets through 21 different missions, each having different objectives to complete; these include intercepting a squadron of enemies, destroying a specific aircraft carrier, or protecting a base from enemy fire. Completing missions awards the player money which can be spent on new aircraft in their personal hangar.

Beginning at the game's fourth mission is the ability to allow a wingman to fly with the player, which provide additional support and will help them in completing the objective. The game begins in a mostly linear format, with branching mission paths being available later on. A fuel meter acts as a time limit and will deplete as the player flies around the level and attacks enemies; the mission will automatically end if the meter fully depletes. New to this game are "aces", elite enemy pilots that can be fought to unlock special medals and their special aircraft for play later. Two difficulty options are present, "Novice" and "Expert", with Expert allowing for realistic aircraft maneuvers such as rolls and high-g turns.

== Development ==
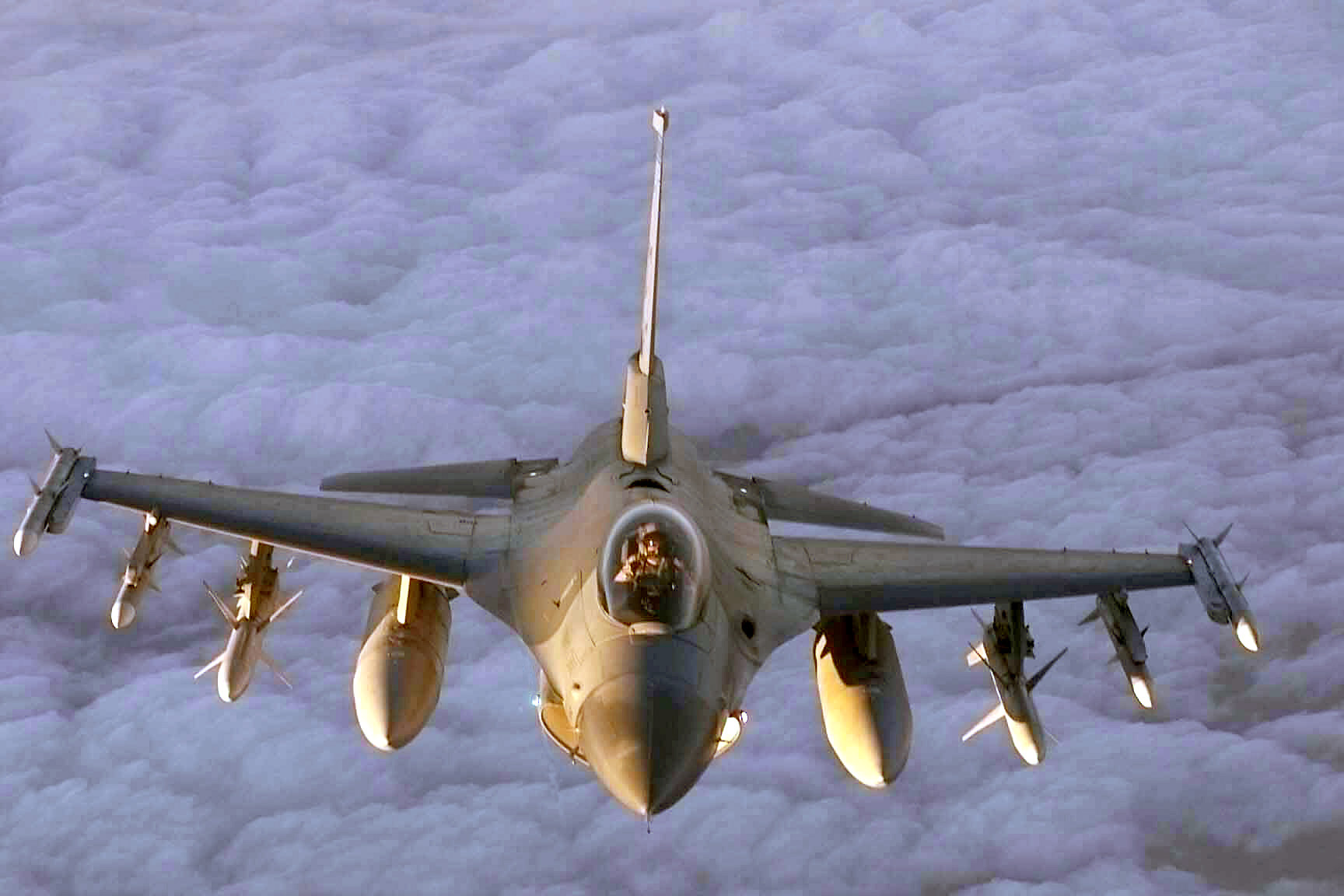
The development team of Ace Combat 2 intentionally chose not to use the exact statistics for real-world aircraft as they felt it would make the game too complex for their target audience.

Ace Combat 2 was the creation of Namco designer Masanori Kato, who previously worked on the game's predecessor Air Combat, and a small team of others. The idea for the game came from Kato's dissatisfaction with the outcome of Air Combat, which he saw as incomplete from a technical point of view. Kato and his team decided to create a follow-up to make the best use of the PlayStation's hardware as possible, with an emphasis on graphics and making the player feel as if they're really flying a fightercraft. One of the first things the team wanted to improve on were the graphics, doing technical research on how many polygons the console could display. The team created a program that was able to output as many polygons as possible without causing strain on the hardware, which allowed the graphics to be of significantly higher-quality than most other games. The team also looked into including a large variety of missions, as opposed to Air Combat's two mission types. Missions were designed to be exciting and fun to play, and when new fighters were added the team determined if they would make the missions more interesting or not. The gameplay itself was designed in the style of an arcade game instead of being strictly a flight-simulation game, which they felt made the game much more fun.

Kato and his team used books on planes and aviation-related magazines as reference when creating new fighters. They also watched several films on air combat and traveled to the American Armed Force airshow to take photographs of the planes on display. To make the game less complex for their target audience, the team decided that the fighters would have different data from that of their real-world counterparts. A simplistic law of physics system was implemented in their place, which kept the game's realism while still providing a user-friendly experience. The team looked into getting advice from a real airplane pilot to refine the gameplay, but were unable to do so. Ideas for missions were from Kato and the team's imaginations, although he stated he wished they were able to travel to real-world places to gather data and references. Environments were created to be visually-impressive and interesting. The development team experimented with a level design that would involve the player attempting to de-rail a trail through a mountain valley, but it was ultimately dropped due to technical and graphical restraints. The overall level structure was tweaked slightly so that the strategy in missions would not feel awkward or unnatural. At the beginning of development, the team wanted the game to support analogue control, adding support for both the PlayStation Analog Joystick and Namco's NeGcon, and later the Dual Analog Controller.

Ace Combat 2 was released in Japan on May 30, 1997, later released in North America on August 21 and in Europe on October 24. The game was re-released as a budget title in Japan on July 29, 1999, as part of Sony's The Best budget label. It is included in the 2005 video game compilation NamCollection for the PlayStation 2 alongside four other Namco PlayStation game ports, in celebration of the company's 50th anniversary.

=== Music ===
The soundtrack for Ace Combat 2, composed by Kohta Takahashi and Nobuhide Isayama along with contributions from Hiroshi Okubo and Tetsukazu Nakanishi, was heavily inspired by Top Gun and largely features funk rock music. While the soundtrack was originally going to be a continuation of Air Combat's upbeat rock sound, Takahashi wanted the music to be 'stimulating' and intense to convey a sense of anxiety, while making sure it had its own distinct flare to prevent it from sounding too similar to Top Gun. The composers also made sure it reflected the designs and objectives of each mission. In addition to the rock tracks that comprise the majority of the soundtrack, there are also a handful of drum and bass and techno tracks to express the science fiction elements; this direction was further explored for the soundtrack of Ace Combat 3: Electrosphere. Most of the sound effects were directly taken from a sound effects CD one of the composers had, while others were entirely original.

No soundtrack was released for the game around its time of release, despite high demand from fans. However, in 2010 a soundtrack CD was included as a bonus with the Deluxe Pack of Ace Combat: Joint Assault; it includes two CDs, one for the main soundtrack and the other featuring bonus arrangements, an unused track, and a selection of tracks from Joint Assault. Digital soundtracks of Ace Combat 2 have since been released on iTunes.

== Reception ==
Reception

Aggregate score
| Aggregator | Score |
|---|---|
| Metacritic | 83/100 |

Review scores
| Publication | Score |
|---|---|
| AllGame | 3.5/5 |
| Computer and Video Games | 5/10 |
| Electronic Gaming Monthly | 8.375/10 |
| Famitsu | 30/40 |
| GameSpot | 7.5/10 |
| IGN | 9/10 |
| Next Generation | 4/5 |
| Dengeki PlayStation | 95/100, 90/100, 95/100, 95/100 |
| Electric Playground | 9/10 |

Ace Combat 2 was a commercial success; in May 1998, Sony gave the game the "Gold Prize" award for selling over 500,000 copies in Japan. It won several awards from video game publications, including the "Silver Hall of Fame" from Famitsu, "Editor's Choice" from IGN, and "Game of the Month" from Electronic Gaming Monthly. It holds an 83 out of 100 on reviewer aggregator website Metacritic, indicating "generally favorable reviews".

The game was well received by critics. Crispin Boyer of Electronic Gaming Monthly applauded the draw distance, while Computer and Video Games called it "the most intense flight experience to ever grace a console". Next Generation said that it would "keep a whole bunch of weekend warriors strapped in to the TV", while IGN labeled it "one of the best flight simulators ever to come to the PlayStation" and said that Namco went "all out" with its visuals. The four reviewers of Electronic Gaming Monthly felt the game's strongest point was its variety, with multiple planes to choose from and unlock and widely varying mission objectives. Publications commended the quality of the gameplay for its fast-pace and variety in missions, although AllGame and Computer and Video Games felt it became "monotonous" and tiring after a while. Jeff Gerstmann of GameSpot argued that the low difficulty level ensures the game is over too quickly in spite of the large number of missions. However, the majority of critics contended that the enemy artificial intelligence is extremely advanced and responds to player movements, making the game's difficulty, if anything, overly high. The game's consistently high frame rate and environmental visuals were subjects of praise.

Many publications agreed that Ace Combat 2 was a vast improvement over its predecessor, with IGN, Electric Playground and GamePro all commending Namco for successfully updating the gameplay in the original to make it much more action-packed and entertaining. Next Generation said it was an excellent follow-up to Air Combat, with Famitsu adding that it made for one of the best sequel games the company had put out on the PlayStation. Several also liked the game's controls for being responsive and smooth; Next Generation credited the game's support for the PlayStation Analog Joystick, which they felt made the game even more realistic than it was before. While some criticized the lack of a multiplayer mode, Computer and Video Games argued that the removal of a two-player option was a good idea, feeling that it allowed Namco to refine the gameplay and stages in general. Electric Playground and AllGame both praised the large selection of playable fighters, with AllGame also applauding its usage of secrets and unlockable extras.

== Remake ==
A remake for the Nintendo 3DS, Ace Combat: Assault Horizon Legacy, was released in 2011 in North America and Europe, and in 2012 in Japan, where it was renamed Ace Combat 3D: Cross Rumble. Assault Horizon Legacy features a complete revamp of the game's storyline, alongside the addition of cutscenes, voice acting and remade level designs. It also adds several new fighters not found in the original, including the Boeing F-15SE Silent Eagle and the Sukhoi PAK FA. Despite its namesake, it has very little in common with its predecessor Ace Combat: Assault Horizon. It was followed by a 2015 update called Ace Combat: Assault Horizon Legacy +, adding Amiibo support and updated control handling for the New Nintendo 3DS.
