= Ace Combat: Assault Horizon =

2011 video game

- Developer: Project Aces
- Publisher: Bandai Namco Games
- Director: Natsuki Isaki
- Producers: Kazutoki Kono; Hiroyuki Ichiyanagi
- Designers: Sanshiro Hidaka; Ryousuke Waki; Kazuo Yamamoto; Masaya Amano
- Writer: Jim DeFelice
- Composers: Keiki Kobayashi; Hiroshi Okubo; Rio Hamamoto; Jesahm; Norihiko Hibino; Takahiro Izutani; Yoshitaka Suzuki
- Series: Ace Combat
- Platforms: PlayStation 3, Xbox 360, Microsoft Windows
- Release: PlayStation 3 & Xbox 360: NA: October 11, 2011; JP/AU: October 13, 2011; EU: October 14, 2011; Microsoft Windows: WW: January 25, 2013
- Genre: Air combat simulation
- Modes: Single-player, multiplayer

Ace Combat: Assault Horizon (Note: Japanese: エースコンバット アサルトホライゾン, Hepburn: Ēsu Konbatto Asaruto Horaizon) is a 2011 spin-off installment of the Ace Combat flight simulation video game series. It was developed by Project Aces and published by Bandai Namco Games for the PlayStation 3 and Xbox 360 platforms in October 2011. The game was later released on Microsoft Windows in January 2013 through Steam and Games for Windows – Live, with the latter notably being the final retail release for the platform shortly before its discontinuation. The title has also been removed from Steam listings.

The major new gameplay feature is a system called "Dogfighting mode" (DFM), which aims to increase the intensity and bring the action closer to the player. The game features two modes of control, named "Optimum", which prevents the player from doing full rolls, and "Original", which gives the players full control of the aircraft. Co-operative missions and free-for-all Deathmatch have returned, but two new modes named "Capital Conquest" and "Domination" were added to the game. This is also the first Ace Combat title with a plot mostly written by non-Japanese writers, with noted author Jim DeFelice at the helm. Set in 2015–2016, the game's story mainly focuses on members of the United Nations' 108th Task Force, a joint NATO-Russia military organization primarily assigned to quell a rebellion spreading over East Africa.

Assault Horizon continued the trend of Ace Combat games set in the real Earth rather than on "Strangereal", the setting for most Ace Combat games. As a result, the game takes place in various regions, including Miami, East Africa, Moscow, and Dubai. The game received a generally positive reception upon release, with critics praising the game's settings, graphics, and the soundtrack. However, some critics criticized the game for having repetitive gameplay and being overly-scripted. More than 1.07 million copies were sold worldwide upon release.

== Gameplay ==
A screenshot of the game's attack helicopter gameplay in Dogfight Mode

The major new gameplay feature is a system called "Close-Range Assault" (CRA), which aims to increase the intensity and bring the action closer to the player, without the feeling of "shooting at faraway dots" commonly seen in flight games. In the game, it is named "Dogfight Mode" (DFM) for air-to-air battles and "Air Strike Mode" (ASM) for air-to-ground targets. They are not optional, as certain planes and ground targets cannot be destroyed without CRA. To initiate DFM, the player taps LB+RB on the Xbox 360 or L2+R2 on the PS3 when they have gotten close enough to the plane they are targeting. ASM is initiated by pressing the same buttons at specific points around the map.

Unique to Assault Horizon are playable aircraft that are not the fixed-wing jets traditionally focused on by the Ace Combat series: the B-1 Lancer and B-2 Spirit strategic bombers, the AH-64 Apache and UH-60 Black Hawk helicopters, and the AC-130 Spectre gunship appear as playable aircraft.

=== Multiplayer ===
Assault Horizon's multiplayer has been improved since Ace Combat 6: Fires of Liberation. Co-operative missions and free-for-all Deathmatch have returned, but two new modes have been added as well: "Capital Conquest" and "Domination". In Capital Conquest, two teams of 4v4 or 8v8 each take control of their own headquarters, and must destroy the other team's headquarters. First, the transmission base in the center of the map must come under one team's control; once that's accomplished, the team's multi-roles and attackers (and bombers, given the right conditions) can initiate Air Strike Mode to damage the other team's HQ. The first team to destroy the other's HQ wins; if the time limit is reached before an HQ could be destroyed, then the team with the most HQ health remaining wins. On the Ace Combat website, players can join an online faction (one for each capital city featured in Capital Conquest), and any points they receive individually while playing in a certain city will go towards that player's faction's control of that city. Every six weeks, the faction with the most global control wins.

In Domination, two teams of 4v4 or 8v8 battle it out to take control of three different bases in one single city. Taking control of a base is similar to the "King of the Hill" mode in other games; when a base is neutral, one team must stay inside it for a certain amount of time to take it over. The opposing team must destroy the ground targets that now pop up around that base, and then they must stay inside for a certain amount of time to take it over. Every 60 seconds, points are awarded to each team, 1 for each base they control at the time. The team with the most points wins.

=== Controls ===
There are two control schemes in the game: "Optimum" and "Original":

- The new "Optimum" control scheme prevents the player from doing full rolls, to gain the stability needed to get the best of the new Close Range Assault system. This is the default mode that has been used in most of the game's media and hasn't been seen in the series.
- The "Original" control scheme is similar to the controls in the previous titles under "Expert". It gives the players full control of the aircraft, with the left stick making it roll instead of turn.

In addition to these settings, there are many options to tweak the controls and adapt to the player's style. It includes the choice of normal or reverse settings for the Pitch Control, Camera Control, Throttle, and Yaw. High-G turns return from Ace Combat 6: Fires of Liberation, as well as Auto Pilot if both shoulder buttons are held down. Lastly, the Flight Assistance provides opportunities to players such as Auto-leveling, Automatic Collision Prevention, Automatic Stall Prevention, Sight Assist, and Automatic Forward Target Selection. Flight Assistance can be turned on or off. On the Xbox 360, the game supports the Ace Edge Joysticks released with Ace Combat 6: Fires of Liberation.

== Synopsis ==
=== Setting ===
Unlike other games in the Ace Combat series (but in the same vein as Ace Combat: Joint Assault), Assault Horizon takes place in real-world locations. The plot is set between 2015 and 2016, in locations within East Africa, the Middle East, Russia, and the United States.

The game's protagonists are mostly members of the United Nations' 108th Task Force, a joint NATO-Russian military unit primarily assigned to quell a rebellion spreading over East Africa. Players primarily assume the role of Lieutenant Colonel William Bishop, leader of the United States Air Force's Warwolf Squadron, assisted by wingman José "Guts" Gutierrez and French NATO General Pierre La Pointe. Also playable are the pilots of the 108th's Shooter, Nomad, and Spooky Squadrons, who are controlled in the game's helicopter turret, attack helicopter, and gunship sections. The antagonists are Russian General Ivan Stagleishov and Russian Air Force pilots Andrei Markov and Maj. Sergei Illich, members of a Russian criminal syndicate called the Blatnoi that seeks to seize control over Russia as the New Russian Federation (NRF).

=== Plot ===
Following a vivid nightmare of being shot down by a Su-35 with "shark mouth" nose art during an attack on Miami, USAF Lieutenant Colonel William Bishop participates in a series of missions with Warwolf Squadron and the 108th against the SRN rebel group in East Africa. After discovering a powerful explosive weapon in the SRN's possession, Warwolf is suddenly attacked by Blatnoi-affiliated traitors from the 108th's Russian contingent, including Andrei Markov, a skilled Russian pilot flying the same plane from Bishop's nightmare who nearly kills him. The Russians withdraw as the SRN attacks a nearby city with their powerful explosive weapon, which the 108th has identified as "Trinity", a Russian thermobaric cruise missile warhead with the power of a tactical nuclear weapon that can be used to inflict WMD-like destruction without resorting to nuclear warfare.

After the 108th defends Dubai from a Blatnoi show-of-force attack and searches associated cargo ships in the Suez Canal, the Blatnoi launches a coup d'état in Russia supported by corrupt Russian Armed Forces officials, including Stagleishov, to form the New Russian Federation. The 108th deploys to support Russian Loyalist forces, and they manage to rescue the Prime Minister of Russia from NRF captivity and prevent NRF-held missile silos from launching ICBMs. The 108th and Russian Loyalists advance to liberate Moscow, but the NRF uses a Trinity missile on the assault force, with a second one inbound; Bishop shoots down the bomber carrying the second Trinity missile and defeats Markov in a dogfight, seemingly killing him.

Stagleishov proposes political immunity in exchange for total surrender and the NRF's last remaining Trinity missile, but Markov, revealed to be alive, kills him and takes control of the NRF, which he mobilizes to attack the United States. Markov is revealed to be seeking revenge for an American airstrike in the Bosnian War that killed his wife. The 108th deploys to defend Miami from a large NRF attack led by Markov on his PAK FA, almost exactly reliving Bishop's nightmare; however, when Markov tries to shoot him down, Guts uses his plane to shield him from Markov's missile, and Bishop manages to shoot out Guts's jammed cockpit so he can eject safely. Bishop pursues Markov to a hurricane off the coast of Florida where Illich, revealed to be working as a sleeper agent and mole for the NRF, sacrifices himself to cover Markov's retreat.

Markov and the remnants of the NRF reemerge to launch a final attack on Washington, D.C. The NRF pilots use their aircraft to conduct kamikaze attacks against the city's air defenses, clearing the way for Markov to target the White House with the final Trinity missile. Bishop duels Markov, who manages to toss the damaged Trinity missile before being shot down and killed. With the missile gliding toward the White House, Bishop damages it enough for it to veer into the Tidal Basin, where it detonates harmlessly. With the NRF defeated and D.C. saved, Bishop lands at Ronald Reagan Washington National Airport, where he is greeted as a hero.

== Development ==
The game was first hinted at by a trademark filing by Bandai Namco in April 2010, then officially announced along with a gameplay trailer on August 9. The trailer showed off the game's attack helicopter gameplay, as well as preview footage of the events of the game's campaign.

Ace Combat: Assault Horizon was, at the time of its release, the second game in the series set in a realistic rendition of Earth rather than in the usual series setting of Strangereal, the first being Ace Combat: Joint Assault. Satellite imagery was used to accurately render the real-life locations in the game, making it possible for players to pick out actual buildings and locations in gameplay. Miami, East Africa, Dubai, Moscow, Paris, and Washington, D.C. were made available as multiplayer maps, while Honolulu and Tokyo were added as downloadable maps.

A demo was released on September 13, 2011. All PlayStation 3 players could download it for free, but Xbox 360 players needed to have Xbox LIVE Gold for the first week in order to download it; it then migrated to Xbox LIVE Silver as well. The demo included Mission 1 and Mission 3, with the iconic nightmare air battle over Miami from the trailers and the attack helicopter rescue operation in Africa, respectively. It has since been removed and is no longer able for other players to download.

In 2011 Macross creator Shouji Kawamori designed a fictional plane for the game, the "ASF-X Shinden II", which was released on October 25 the same year and was offered as downloadable content. It could be purchased in the PlayStation Store for US$7.99 or in the Xbox Marketplace for 640 MS Points.

== Release ==
For European regions, Bandai Namco released a "Limited Edition" that also included the game's soundtrack, a redeemable code to download the F-4E Phantom II aircraft, and a notebook signed by the development team, all in a folded box. Gamers who pre-ordered this Limited Edition of the game received it for the same price as the standard edition. A separate "Helicopter Edition" was also released, containing a 25 cm remote-controlled Black Hawk helicopter (with the livery seen in the game), a remote control, a rechargeable battery for the helicopter, and a branded pen and keychain, along with all of the contents of the Limited Edition. A special edition released in Japan included Aces at War: A History, a special artbook detailing the content from Ace Combat Zero, 4, and 5 from an in-universe perspective, as well as production notes from the Project Aces team.

In Japan, gamers who pre-ordered the game received a code to download the F-4E Phantom II. In the United States, GameStop also offered the plane as an exclusive pre-order bonus. The Japanese edition of the game also has options to download special skins for the F-14D representing Roy Fokker and Hikaru Ichijo's VF-1 Valkyrie transformable fighters from Macross.

A patch was released on November 26, 2012, that fixed some of the jarring issues players had complained about with the multiplayer, specifically about players cheating with certain weapons or maneuvers. A day later, the PC version of the game was officially announced, as well as the availability of the game on the PlayStation Store and Xbox 360 Games on Demand. The PC version was available through retailers as well as Steam and Games for Windows Marketplace.

The "Enhanced Edition" is exclusive to PCs; it comes with optimized controls and graphics as well as several additional aircraft, aircraft skins, multiplayer maps, and multiplayer skills. It was released in the winter of 2012.

The "Advanced Edition" was exclusive to the PlayStation Store. It came with the Tokyo and Honolulu maps, as well as the ASF-X Shinden II, F-15S/MTD, Su-37 Terminator, AV-8B Harrier II, CFA-44 Nosferatu, and Ka-50 Hokum.

=== Tie-in novel ===
In March 2012, ASCII Media Works released Ace Combat: Ikaros in the Sky. A tie-in novel for Assault Horizon, Ikaros in the Sky is the story of series character Kei Nagase as she participates in the JASDF's ASF-X Shinden II fighter program. Character designs were provided by Yūsuke Kozaki.

== Reception ==
Reception

Aggregate scores
Aggregator	Score
GameRankings	78.41% (X360); 75.93% (PS3)
Metacritic	78/100 (X360); 77/100 (PS3); 77/100 (PC)

Review scores
Publication	Score
1Up.com	D+
GameSpot	5.5/10
IGN	7.5/10

The game has garnered generally positive reviews. Metacritic gives the game a 78 out of 100 (based on 71 reviews) for the Xbox 360 release, a 77 out of 100 (based on 28 reviews) for the PlayStation 3 release, and a 77/100 for the Enhanced Edition on PC.

Critics praised the real-world settings, graphics, and the soundtrack, but criticized the game for being repetitive and overly scripted. Critics also praised the voice-acting of the characters. Reception from the audience has also been positive; users on Metacritic give a 6.8/10 for the Xbox 360 and a 7.2/10 for the PS3, with some gamers feeling that the new gameplay elements kept the series "fresh and exciting". IGN gave Assault Horizon a 7.5/10, praising the game for keeping the arcade-like controls to make it easy to jump into. The editor noted that this was more like a spin-off than an actual part of the series, especially since it didn't have a number; however, it was again criticized for its repetition in the new Close Range Assault systems. GameSpot gave the game a 5.5/10 and 1UP gave it a D+, finding some of these criticized features to be what ruined the game's potential, and comparing the game to the Call of Duty series.

In response to the initial mostly positive response, Bandai Namco Games created a special "Accolades Trailer" one month after the game's release, in which many of the positive comments from well-known reviewers are featured alongside gameplay. As of May 8, 2012, the game has sold 1.07 million copies worldwide.
