= NamCollection =

- Developer: Namco
- Publisher: Namco
- Platform: PlayStation 2
- Release: JP: July 21, 2005
- Genre: Compilation
- Mode: Single-player

NamCollection (Note: Japanese: ナムコレクション, Hepburn: NamuKorekushon) is a 2005 video game compilation by Namco. The compilation was released in Japan to celebrate the company's 50th anniversary and contains five ports of various PlayStation games with added analog support and retexturing.

== Games ==
- Ace Combat 2 (1997)
- Klonoa: Door to Phantomile (1997)
- Mr. Driller (1999)
- Ridge Racer (1993)
- Tekken (1994)

== Development and release ==
NamCollection was released by Namco exclusively in Japan on July 21, 2005 for the PlayStation 2 to coincide with the company's 50th anniversary. The game was publicly announced by Japanese publication Famitsu on March 24, reported to be around 80% complete by that time. Originally slated for release on June 2, it was later delayed to July 31 of that year for unknown reasons.
