= Ace Combat =

Flight action video game series

- Genre: Combat flight simulation
- Developers: Namco; Bandai Namco Studios; Access Games; Bandai Namco Aces
- Publishers: Namco; Bandai Namco Entertainment
- Platforms: PlayStation, PlayStation 2, Game Boy Advance, Mobile phone, Xbox 360, PlayStation 3, PlayStation Portable, iOS, Windows, Nintendo 3DS, PlayStation 4, Xbox One, Nintendo Switch, PlayStation 5, Xbox Series X/S
- First release: Air Combat; June 30, 1995
- Latest release: Ace Combat 8: Wings of Theve; October 2, 2026

Ace Combat (Note: Japanese: エースコンバット, Hepburn: Ēsu Konbatto) is an arcade-style combat flight simulation video game series by Bandai Namco Entertainment (formerly Namco). Debuting in 1995 with Air Combat for the PlayStation, the series includes nine mainline installments, multiple spin-offs, and other forms of media including novels, model kits, soundtrack albums, and a web series. Since 2012, the series has been developed primarily by Bandai Namco Studios through its dedicated internal development group Bandai Namco Aces, known until 2022 as Project Aces.

Ace Combat emphasizes fast-paced action and dramatic plots, paired with semi-realistic simulations of aerial warfare and flight that make stylistic and gameplay-oriented compromises (such as allowing for more equipped aircraft ordnance than what hardpoints can physically mount). The series prominently features modern jet military aircraft—fighters, attackers, and multiroles, among others—with representations of real licensed aircraft models produced by manufacturers such as Lockheed Martin, Northrop Grumman, Boeing, United Aircraft Corporation, Dassault, Saab AB, and Eurofighter GmbH (among others), alongside fictional aircraft designed for the series. The main series is set in "Strangereal", a fictional universe loosely based on the real world, featuring similar events and entities but with an entirely different geography and history, though certain spin-offs are set in fictional renditions of the real world. Hallmarks of the Ace Combat series include melodramatic "anime-like" stories and dialogue, boss-type superweapons using fantastical technology, climactic "tunnel run" segments involving flying at high speeds through enclosed tunnels, and multi-genre soundtracks with prominent use of orchestral music.

As of 2023, the Ace Combat franchise has shipped over 20 million copies worldwide, (Note: Over 14 million copies shipped by 2018, plus over 7 million copies sold of Ace Combat 7: Skies Unknown after its release in 2019.) and has become one of the longest-running arcade flight action franchises.

== Setting ==
Ace Combat main chronology
- Air Combat and Zero: The Belkan War (1995)
- 2 (Assault Horizon Legacy) (1997–1998)
- 04: Shattered Skies (2004–2005)
- 5: The Unsung War (2010)
- 6: Fires of Liberation and Northern Wings (2015–2016)
- 7: Skies Unknown (2019)
- X: Skies of Deception and Xi: Skies of Incursion (2020)
- 8: Wings of Theve (2029–2030)
- Advance (2032)
- 3: Electrosphere (2040)

Most installments in the Ace Combat series are set in Strangereal, the series' fictional universe. Strangereal features unique nations, geography, and history, with some countries, locations, and events being loosely modeled after various rough equivalents from the real world; for example, Strangereal's superpowers of the Osean Federation and Yuktobania take clear inspiration from the United States and Soviet Union respectively, but the former also includes elements of Canada and Japan. Strangereal's Earth has six continents—North Osea, South Osea, Usea, Verusa, Anea, and Antarctia—with all except the Osean continents being separated by oceans.

Strangereal's society is largely similar to that of the real modern world, but with massively advanced technology that allows for the development of superweapons and theoretical devices such as aerial warships, landships, laser weapons, railguns, submarine and airborne aircraft carriers, orbital weapons, mass drivers, space elevators, nuclear fusion reactors, autonomous weaponry including unmanned fighter aircraft, mass-scale 3D printing manufacturing, near-sentient artificial intelligence, neurotechnology, and highly-advanced experimental aircraft. Nuclear weapons exist, but international agreements and the threat of nuclear terrorism are implied to have inhibited their development and use, resulting in a lack of nuclear deterrence and a greater focus on conventional weaponry in arms races. This makes large-scale interstate warfare common, and many nations field large militaries with diverse equipment, develop superweapons, train elite special forces-esque "ace" fighter squadrons, or hire mercenaries to augment their forces.

Most Strangereal-set Ace Combat games are set in the decades after a 1999 impact event in which the asteroid "Ulysses 1994XF04", found to be on a collision course with Earth, was split up by anti-asteroid weaponry into multiple fragments that still struck the planet, preventing global extinction but causing widespread destruction and sparking severe crises, particularly in Usea and Anea, that influence later conflicts depicted in the series. Another major event is the 1995 "Belkan War", a World War II-esque regional conflict in North Osea in which the advanced ultranationalist nation of Belka attempted to invade neighboring countries during an internal crisis, was repelled by an international coalition, and used nuclear weapons on their own territory to deter a retaliatory invasion, causing their defeat and earning them global condemnation and scorn; Belkan ultranationalists seeking revenge for their loss play significant roles in some of the games.

Almost all Strangereal-set Ace Combat games gradually build up to Ace Combat 3: Electrosphere's cyberpunk setting of 2040, when Usea's nations are largely superseded by the corporatocracies of the rivaling sovereign megacorporations General Resource and Neucom. This setting is also marked as the starting point of Bandai Namco's United Galaxy Space Force (UGSF) shared universe, in which Strangereal's nations unite to form a world government in 2090 and General Resource and Neucom dominate Earth for a millennium; however, UGSF is considered a separate continuity from the main Ace Combat series timeline, meaning this turn of events is not guaranteed to occur in the Ace Combat series itself.

Ace Combat: Joint Assault, Assault Horizon, and Infinity are not set in Strangereal, and are instead set in their own fictionalized versions of the real world, albeit with technological levels similar to that of Strangereal.

== Games ==
Year	Title	Platform
Mainline titles
1995	Air Combat	PlayStation, EZweb
1997	Ace Combat 2	PlayStation
1999	Ace Combat 3: Electrosphere	PlayStation
2001	Ace Combat 04: Shattered Skies	PlayStation 2
2004	Ace Combat 5: The Unsung War	PlayStation 2, PlayStation 4
2006	Ace Combat Zero: The Belkan War	PlayStation 2, PlayStation 5, Windows, Xbox Series X/S
2007	Ace Combat 6: Fires of Liberation	Xbox 360
2019	Ace Combat 7: Skies Unknown	Windows, PlayStation 4, Xbox One, Nintendo Switch
2026	Ace Combat 8: Wings of Theve	Windows, PlayStation 5, Xbox Series X/S
Spin-off titles
2011	Ace Combat: Assault Horizon	Windows, PlayStation 3, Xbox 360
2014	Ace Combat Infinity	PlayStation 3
Handheld console titles
2005	Ace Combat Advance	Game Boy Advance
2006	Ace Combat X: Skies of Deception	PlayStation Portable
2010	Ace Combat: Joint Assault	PlayStation Portable
2011	Ace Combat: Assault Horizon Legacy	Nintendo 3DS
Mobile titles
2009	Ace Combat Xi: Skies of Incursion	iOS
2010	Ace Combat: Assault Horizon Trigger Finger	iOS
2011	Ace Combat: Northern Wings	J2ME

Release timeline
1995	Air Combat
1996
1997	Ace Combat 2
1998
1999	Ace Combat 3: Electrosphere
2000
2001	Ace Combat 04: Shattered Skies
2002
2003
2004	Ace Combat 5: The Unsung War
2005	Ace Combat Advance
2006	Ace Combat Zero: The Belkan War
2006	Ace Combat X: Skies of Deception
2007	Ace Combat 6: Fires of Liberation
2008
2009	Ace Combat Xi: Skies of Incursion
2010	Ace Combat: Joint Assault
2010	Ace Combat Assault Horizon: Trigger Finger
2011	Ace Combat: Assault Horizon
2011	Ace Combat: Assault Horizon Legacy
2011	Ace Combat: Northern Wings
2012
2013
2014	Ace Combat Infinity
2015	Ace Combat: Assault Horizon Legacy+
2016
2017
2018
2019	Ace Combat 7: Skies Unknown
2020
2021
2022
2023
2024
2025
2026	Ace Combat 8: Wings of Theve

- Air Combat (1995) is the debut entry of the series, being released as a launch title for the PlayStation in North America and titled Ace Combat in Japan. Produced by Kazumi Mizuno as a port-turned-successor to the 1993 arcade game of the same name, the plot centers around a team of mercenary pilots hired to defeat a terrorist organization that has seized control of the Skully Islands. Air Combat introduced the series' arcade-like gameplay, a contrast to most other flight sim games at the time. In 2005, Air Combat was released for Japanese mobile phones under Namco's game subscription service.
- Ace Combat 2 (1997) was released for the PlayStation, and created out of Namco's dissatisfaction with Air Combat from a technical standpoint. Designed by Masanori Kato, Ace Combat 2 follows Scarface, a mercenary squadron (the same from Air Combat) who are hired again to defeat a coup d'état that threatens the continent of Usea. The sequel builds upon its predecessor in several ways, adding new mission types, playable aircraft, and multiple difficulty options. Ace Combat 2 was re-released in 2005 for the PlayStation 2 through NamCollection, a Japan-exclusive collection of Namco-developed PlayStation games. In 2011, the game was remade for the 3DS as Ace Combat: Assault Horizon Legacy, featuring new levels, an updated plot, and new game mechanics.
- Ace Combat 3: Electrosphere (1999) was published for the PlayStation, being the last game in the series for the console. While the previous two games carry a modern-day aesthetic, Electrosphere uses a futuristic aesthetic and setting, and depicts a conflict in a cyberpunk corporatocratic Usea between the megacorporations General Resource and Neucom, the peacekeeping organization UPEO, and the transhumanist terrorist group Ouroboros. Electrosphere is heavily reliant on story, with branching stage paths and anime-style video emails with full voice acting. The international versions of the game cut down much of its story and content to accommodate for financial constraints.
- Ace Combat 04: Shattered Skies (2001) was the first game in the series to be developed by Project Aces, then-known as the "AC04 Project". Released for the PlayStation 2 and renamed Ace Combat: Distant Thunder in Europe, it was the first entry in the series to thoroughly flesh out Strangereal as the main setting. The game's plot tells the story of Mobius 1, a fighter pilot whose legendary exploits during a continent-wide war become instrumental in stopping the country of Erusea's plans to conquer all of Usea. Initially intended as a series reboot, Shattered Skies returned to the gameplay structure of Air Combat and Ace Combat 2, with fast-paced action and mission variety in a more linear plot.
- Ace Combat 5: The Unsung War (2004) was released for the PlayStation 2, renamed Ace Combat: Squadron Leader for Europe. Produced by Kazutoki Kono and Project Aces, The Unsung War is one of the most expansive titles in the series, with over 50 playable aircraft and 32 campaign missions, along with fully animated cutscenes. The plot follows the members of Wardog Squadron, who uncover a conspiracy fueling a large-scale war between the global superpowers of Osea and Yuktobania. The game also features an arcade mode, following Mobius 1 on a mission to defeat Erusean holdouts. In 2018, Bandai Namco Entertainment re-released The Unsung War for the PlayStation 4 as a pre-order bonus for Ace Combat 7, with slight modifications to allow it to run properly on the console's hardware.
- Ace Combat Zero: The Belkan War (2006) was released for the PlayStation 2, renamed Ace Combat: The Belkan War in Europe. It was the last Ace Combat game developed by Namco before their assets were folded into Bandai Namco Games, who published the game outside Japan, just a week after its launch in Japan. The Belkan War serves as a prequel to The Unsung War, combining ideas and mechanics from both it and Shattered Skies and explaining plot details and lore mentioned in The Unsung War's story. The plot, told through retrospective narration, recounts the exploits of Galm Team, a pair of mercenary pilots hired to defend the country of Ustio and its allies from an invasion by Belka in 1995. The Belkan War was re-released as a pre-order bonus for Ace Combat 8 on Playstation 5, Xbox Series and PC through Steam, with slight modifications to allow it to run properly on all systems.
- Ace Combat X: Skies of Deception (2006) was released for the PlayStation Portable as the first entry in the series to be released on the console. Its plot follows a war between the neighboring countries of Aurelia and Leasath, and the actions of Aurelia's Gryphus Squadron in the fight against the invading Leasathean forces. The game features the ability for the player to choose their own route through the campaign, allowing for multiple different mission combinations in each playthrough.
- Ace Combat 6: Fires of Liberation (2007) was released for the Xbox 360, marking the series' debut on a Microsoft platform. It was the first Ace Combat title to implement online multiplayer and downloadable content, which have become staple inclusions since. Alongside a standalone release, Namco Bandai bundled Fires of Liberation with the Ace Edge, a flight stick designed by Hori specifically for the game, and a custom Xbox 360 console faceplate. Its story revolves around an invasion of Emmeria by the neighboring country of Estovakia, and the subsequent efforts of Emmerian forces to take back their country, from the perspective of the pilots of Garuda Team. In 2018, Bandai Namco Entertainment re-released Fires of Liberation for the Xbox One as a pre-order bonus for Ace Combat 7, with slight modifications to allow it to run properly on the console's hardware.
- Ace Combat: Joint Assault (2010) was released for the PlayStation Portable as the first game in the series to be set in the real world. Joint Assault's plot follows the pilots of Martinez Security, a private military company hired to help defeat a heavily armed global terrorist force. The game's campaign features cooperative gameplay for up to four players, and new aerial combat mechanics that simplify dogfights.
- Ace Combat: Assault Horizon (2011) was released for the PlayStation 3 and Xbox 360, with a later release for Microsoft Windows in 2013 through Steam. Set in the real world, but in a different universe than Joint Assault, the game's plot follows the 108th Task Force, a U.S.–Russian military coalition deployed to fight insurgencies and criminal organizations. Assault Horizon features significant gameplay differences compared to other entries in the series, such as a "dogfight mode" and "airstrike mode" to simplify gameplay, a "gritty" Call of Duty-esque art direction, and unique turret sections for helicopters, gunships, and bombers, the first time in the series that these types of aircraft are playable.
- Ace Combat Infinity (2014) was released for the PlayStation 3 as the series' first free-to-play entry. Set in the real world, but in a different universe than Joint Assault and Assault Horizon, Infinity follows the aftermath of a real-world Ulysses incident and the rise of a terrorist organization in devastated Eurasia, with the United Nations enlisting several private military companies to fight back. The game featured expansive multiplayer modes and a freemium model. Infinity's services were discontinued in 2018, with its plot left on a cliffhanger.
- Ace Combat 7: Skies Unknown (2019) was released for the PlayStation 4, Xbox One, PC through Steam, and Nintendo Switch, and was the first mainline installment released in twelve years. Returning to the series' traditional setting of Strangereal, the game, set during a war between Osea and Erusea over a Usean space elevator, follows the exploits of Trigger, an Osean pilot who is tasked with clearing his name after a false accusation of murder lands him in a penal squadron. Skies Unknown was created based on the commercial success of Ace Combat Infinity, with its mechanics being borrowed from both it and Ace Combat: Assault Horizon. Designed by Project Aces and headed by producer Kazutoki Kono, Skies Unknown features multiple additions to the series, including multiple game modes, enhancements to the aircraft tuning concept from Ace Combat X, and virtual reality support through PlayStation VR. The game's three VR missions, set five years before the campaign, follow Mobius 1's continued fight against the Erusean holdouts seen in The Unsung War's arcade mode.
- Ace Combat 8: Wings of Theve (2026) was released for PlayStation 5, Xbox Series X/S, and PC through Steam. The game is set during the invasion of the Federation of Central Usea (FCU) by Sotoa, and follows the FCU's Joker Flight, led by an unnamed pilot who is assigned to impersonate another deceased "legendary pilot" known as the "Wings of Theve" whose fame and combat records were fabricated for propaganda reasons. The game also includes an extensive multiplayer mode, Ace Combat Online, that incorporates elements from Ace Combat Infinity.

=== Title differences ===
Some Ace Combat games have differences in their title, depending on the region (NTSC or PAL) the game was sold in:

- The Japanese Ace Combat was renamed Air Combat in the North American and European releases of the original game. The second game was initially set to be released as Air Combat 2 in the U.S., but by the time of release the game (and series) switched to using Ace Combat internationally.
- In NTSC territories, the fourth installment of the series is known as Ace Combat 04: Shattered Skies, while in PAL territories the game is known as Ace Combat: Distant Thunder. The Spanish version of the game is known as Ace Combat: Trueno de Acero, which can be translated as Ace Combat: Steel Thunder.
- The NTSC version of the fifth installment of the game is known as Ace Combat 5: The Unsung War, while the PAL release was renamed Ace Combat: Squadron Leader.
- In PAL territories, the word "Zero" in Ace Combat Zero: The Belkan War was removed, making it the first game since the series introduction to not have a significant name change in PAL territories.
- Ace Combat: Assault Horizon Legacy was titled Ace Combat 3D: Cross Rumble in Japan.

== Other media ==
=== Print media ===
With the release of Assault Horizon in 2011, Project Aces created Aces at War: A History, a special artbook detailing the content from Ace Combat 04, 5, and Zero from an in-universe perspective, as well as production commentary. This was packaged with the special editions of Assault Horizon released in Japan. Aces at War: A History would later be updated and rereleased as part of a special edition of Ace Combat 7: Skies Unknown.

In March 2012, ASCII Media Works released Ace Combat: Ikaros in the Sky. A tie-in novel for Assault Horizon, Ikaros tells a story of series character Kei Nagase as she participates in the JASDF's ASF-X Shinden II fighter program.

=== Web series ===
Ace Combat 8: Hour Zero, a four-part live action web series set shortly before the events of Ace Combat 8: Wings of Theve, was announced on September 10, 2026 and premiered on YouTube on September 15. The web series stars Josh Holloway, Brandon Routh, and Tamlyn Tomita as a pilot, doctor, and reporter respectively during the outbreak of the Sotoa–Usea War. Hour Zero serves as a promotional prequel to the Wings of Theve game, and is the first work in the series since The Belkan War's cutscenes to feature live action performances.

== Reception ==
Sales and aggregate review scores
Game	Units sold	Metacritic	OpenCritic
Air Combat	2.23 million shipped	—	—
Ace Combat 2	1.092 million shipped	83/100	—
Ace Combat 3: Electrosphere	1.164 million shipped	—	—
Ace Combat 04: Shattered Skies	2.64 million shipped	89/100	—
Ace Combat 5: The Unsung War	1.802 million shipped	84/100	—
Ace Combat Advance	100,000 shipped	56/100	—
Ace Combat Zero: The Belkan War	792,000 shipped	75/100	—
Ace Combat X: Skies of Deception	476,000 shipped	75/100	—
Ace Combat 6: Fires of Liberation	700,000	80/100	—
Ace Combat: Assault Horizon	1.07 million	78/100	—
Ace Combat 7: Skies Unknown	7 million	80/100 (PS4)	79% recommend

Ace Combat has been a consistent commercial success, with most mainline installments reaching over one million units shipped. Ace Combat 7: Skies Unknown is the most successful title with over 7 million copies shipped by 2026, followed by Ace Combat 04: Shattered Skies and Air Combat. The games have sold well predominantly in North America and Japan, where over 75% of all revenue was generated from the series by 2008. In total, the Ace Combat franchise has shipped over 20 million copies.

== See also ==
- Air Combat 22
- Project Wingman
- Tom Clancy's H.A.W.X
- The Sky Crawlers: Innocent Aces, a spiritual spin-off released exclusively on the Wii as a tie-in for the film The Sky Crawlers
