= Ace Combat 6: Fires of Liberation =

2007 video game

- North American Xbox 360 cover featuring F-16 Falcon, F-15 Eagle, Eurofighter Typhoon, F-18 Hornet, and A-10 Thunderbolt II
- Developer: Project Aces
- Publisher: Namco Bandai Games (Note: Released under the Namco brand outside North America.)
- Director: Natsuki Isaki
- Producer: Hiroyuki Ichiyanagi
- Designer: Toshiyuki Ishii
- Writer: Toshiyuki Ishii
- Composers: Tetsukazu Nakanishi; Ryuichi Takada; Keiki Kobayashi; Hiroshi Okubo; Junichi Nakatsuru
- Series: Ace Combat
- Platform: Xbox 360
- Release: NA: October 23, 2007; JP: November 1, 2007; EU: November 23, 2007; AU: December 13, 2007
- Genre: Air combat simulation
- Modes: Single-player, multiplayer

Ace Combat 6: Fires of Liberation (Note: エースコンバット６解放への戦火, Ēsu Konbatto Shikkusu Kaihō e no Senka, Ace Combat 6: War on Liberation) is a 2007 arcade-style combat flight simulation video game developed by Project Aces and published by Namco Bandai Games exclusively for the Xbox 360. It is the seventh entry in the Ace Combat franchise and the first mainline installment to not see a release on a PlayStation platform. Set in 2015 in the series' fictional setting of Strangereal, the game's story follows "Talisman", a fighter pilot who helps liberate his country Emmeria from a surprise invasion by its neighbor, Estovakia. The game's cutscenes follow a wider frame story from the perspectives of various civilians and military personnel on both sides of the war as it progresses.

Like other Ace Combat games, Ace Combat 6 features standard gameplay from the series that mixes arcade flight with authentic flight simulation. While gameplay elements from previous titles persist in Ace Combat 6, the game features new game mechanics including the abilities to land at friendly air bases in the area of operations, call allied units for support in combat, and choose specific objectives in certain missions instead of having to complete all of them. Ace Combat 6 features an online multiplayer mode and downloadable content, both firsts for the series.

Ace Combat 6 received generally favorable reviews on release, but had middling sales due to its Xbox 360 exclusivity, and the game's lukewarm sales performance was a factor in the Ace Combat series remaining in an uncertain state until Ace Combat Infinity's release in 2014. In January 2019, Ace Combat 6 was made available for backwards compatibility with the Xbox One. Players who pre-ordered Ace Combat 7: Skies Unknown on Xbox One received a digital copy of Ace Combat 6, but physical copies also work with the Xbox One. The game was also made backwards compatible with the Xbox Series X/S upon the console's launch in late 2020. In 2026, the game was decompiled and received an unofficial Windows port, created by a group of fans.

== Gameplay ==
A gameplay screenshot of the co-op mode

Like other entries in the Ace Combat series, Ace Combat 6 is a combat flight simulation game in which the player pilots military aircraft to complete various objectives, ranging from dogfighting hostile aircraft, to conducting airstrikes, to battling high-tech superweapons. The game, and its wider series, forgoes a realistic flight model in favor of more accessible gameplay.

During the single-player campaign, players are given a briefing prior to each mission, where they are informed of the situation, their objectives, the opposition, and environmental and terrain considerations, over a map of the mission area. Players complete missions by destroying enemy air and surface targets and completing specific mission objectives. Computer-controlled wingmen and allied units accompany the player through each mission, providing exposition and limited combat support. Like most Ace Combat games, the story is largely progressed through briefings, radio communications during missions, and cutscenes between missions; Ace Combat 6's cutscenes are 3D-animated prerendered cutscenes, similar to those in Ace Combat 5: The Unsung War, but follow the perspectives of various side characters instead of one secondary protagonist or the protagonist characters, as they did in previous games.

The game features 15 different real and fictional aircraft, categorized into fighters, attackers, and multiroles based on their design and role, each with their own specializations and vulnerabilities. In combat, players can use their aircraft's guns and missiles against all targets, as well as a limited selection of situational special weapons for each aircraft suiting their role. Special weapons include air-to-air missiles, air-to-ground weaponry, and anti-ship missiles, among others, though only one special weapon can be equipped at a time. Aircraft can be purchased with credits, which are earned by completing missions.

Ace Combat 6's primary gameplay gimmicks are "Allied Support", a readjusted successor to the "Wingman Command" feature from Ace Combat 5 that allows players to call for support or cover from friendly units instead of just their own squadron; "Frontline Resupply", which allows aircraft to be dynamically repaired and rearmed by landing at a friendly airbase in some missions, as opposed to the traditional use of a "Return Line" that briefly removed players from the mission area; and the "Dynamic Mission System", which allows players to select the specific objectives they want to complete in certain wider missions instead of requiring players to complete all of them. Checkpoints to save mission progress at certain points are also new in Ace Combat 6 as a quality of life feature.

In addition to the single-player campaign, Ace Combat 6 is the first game in the series to offer online multiplayer, with four modes: Battle Royale, Siege Battle, Team Battle, and Co-Op Battle.

== Synopsis ==
=== Setting ===
Ace Combat 6 is set in the series' fictional universe of Strangereal, where Earth has entirely different nations, geography, and history. The game's story details the 2015 Emmeria-Estovakia War, fought in the northern continent of Anea between the neighboring republics of Emmeria and Estovakia. Sixteen years prior, a global asteroid impact event devastated Estovakia, but Emmeria was left unscathed and continued to thrive. A civil war broke out in Estovakia that saw a military junta known as "The Generals" take power amid fierce anti-Emmerian sentiment.

Players control Emmerian fighter pilot "Talisman". Alongside Talisman's wingman, Marcus Lampert, callsign "Shamrock", the pair make up the two-pilot squadron "Garuda Team". Other main characters seen in cutscenes include Lt. Col. Victor Voychek, an Estovakian ace pilot-turned-intelligence officer; Melissa Herman, an Emmerian refugee searching for her missing daughter Matilda; Ludmila Tolstaya, an Estovakian civilian seeking to reunite with her fiancé Toscha, an Estovakian pilot; and "Serval", an Emmerian tank unit consisting of Louis McKnight, Donnie Torch, and Kevin Hobsbawm, who plan a bank heist behind enemy lines.

=== Plot ===
In 2015, the Emmerian capital of Gracemeria is attacked by Estovakia. Emmerian forces scramble to defend Gracemeria, including Talisman and Shamrock, who form Garuda Team due to neither pilot having a wingman. As the battle begins, Melissa witnesses Estovakian aircraft destroy the bridge that Matilda's school bus is supposed to be crossing. Estovakia deploys their P-1112 Aigaion airborne aircraft carrier and their elite "Strigon Team" squadron led by Lt. Col. Voychek, securing air supremacy and routing Emmerian forces. Now a refugee, Melissa learns her husband was killed in action, but later hears Matilda's voice in a radio broadcast from Estovakian-occupied Gracemeria and travels back to the city to find her. Voychek, injured after being shot down by Garuda Team, is reassigned to interrogate Emmerian POWs, but they only taunt him to "go dance with the angels", a phrase from Matilda's broadcasts used as a slogan of defiance by the Emmerians.

Over the next three months, Emmerian forces retreat westward under Estovakian attack, before regrouping at Khesed Island to launch a counterattack. Garuda Team supports the counteroffensive and destroys the Aigaion, allowing the Emmerians to rapidly advance. Meanwhile, Melissa meets Ludmila, who joins her to find Toscha; Serval plans their heist and gives Melissa and Ludmila a ride to Gracemeria when they cross paths; and Voychek discovers a group of rebel children, including Matilda, hiding in Gracemeria's ancient catacombs, but they are trapped in a collapse.

As Emmerian forces approach Gracemeria, a ceasefire is suddenly called after Estovakia threatens to deploy chemical weapons on Gracemeria in a scorched earth defense should Emmerian forces advance further, but Garuda Team destroys Estovakia's chemical weapon stockpiles. After intense urban warfare, the Emmerians liberate Gracemeria, while Garuda Team defeats Strigon Team and their new leader Ilya Pasternak. Melissa and Ludmila reach Gracemeria alongside Serval, who inadvertently rescue Voychek and the children after mistaking the catacombs for a bank vault; Melissa reunites with Matilda, while Serval gives up on the robbery and recovers royal artifacts from the catacombs to inspire the populace.

During a post-liberation patrol over Gracemeria, the city is suddenly attacked by long-range missiles, which Garuda Team intercepts. With assistance from Melissa, Matilda, and Voychek, the Emmerian military traces the attack to the Chandelier, an Estovakian anti-asteroid railgun repurposed to destroy Gracemeria. Emmeria launches an operation to destroy the Chandelier, and Shamrock sacrifices his plane to expose the facility's weak point for Talisman to destroy. The Generals are overthrown, and the new Estovakian government negotiates peace with Emmeria, ending the war. Ludmila and Toscha marry in an internment camp with Voychek attending, while Shamrock is revealed to have survived the final battle. As he visits the Herman household to meet Melissa and Matilda, Shamrock muses that peace between nations was what they had always been fighting for, and that it had finally come.

== Downloadable content ==
Namco released seven sets of downloadable paint schemes for Ace Combat 6's aircraft. These paint schemes modify the plane's maneuverability, speed, armor, and payloads. Among the schemes available were those of previous protagonists, aces, squadrons, and organizations from the series; paint schemes based on aircraft prototypes; markings used by real-life military aviation units such as the U.S. Navy's VFA-103; aircraft with monotone paint schemes each themed to a different color for airshows; itasha designs themed after The Idolm@ster; and a Halloween paint scheme for the F-14D that gives the plane stealth capabilities.

An additional difficulty level, called Ace of Aces, was released the year after the game's release. It featured a series of five missions from the campaign modified to have increased enemies and new enemy formations. The allied support system was also built upon, with special enemy units spawning at certain periods that fill the support gauge.

On June 30, 2016, all DLC for Ace Combat 6 was removed from the Xbox LIVE Marketplace.

== Ace Edge ==
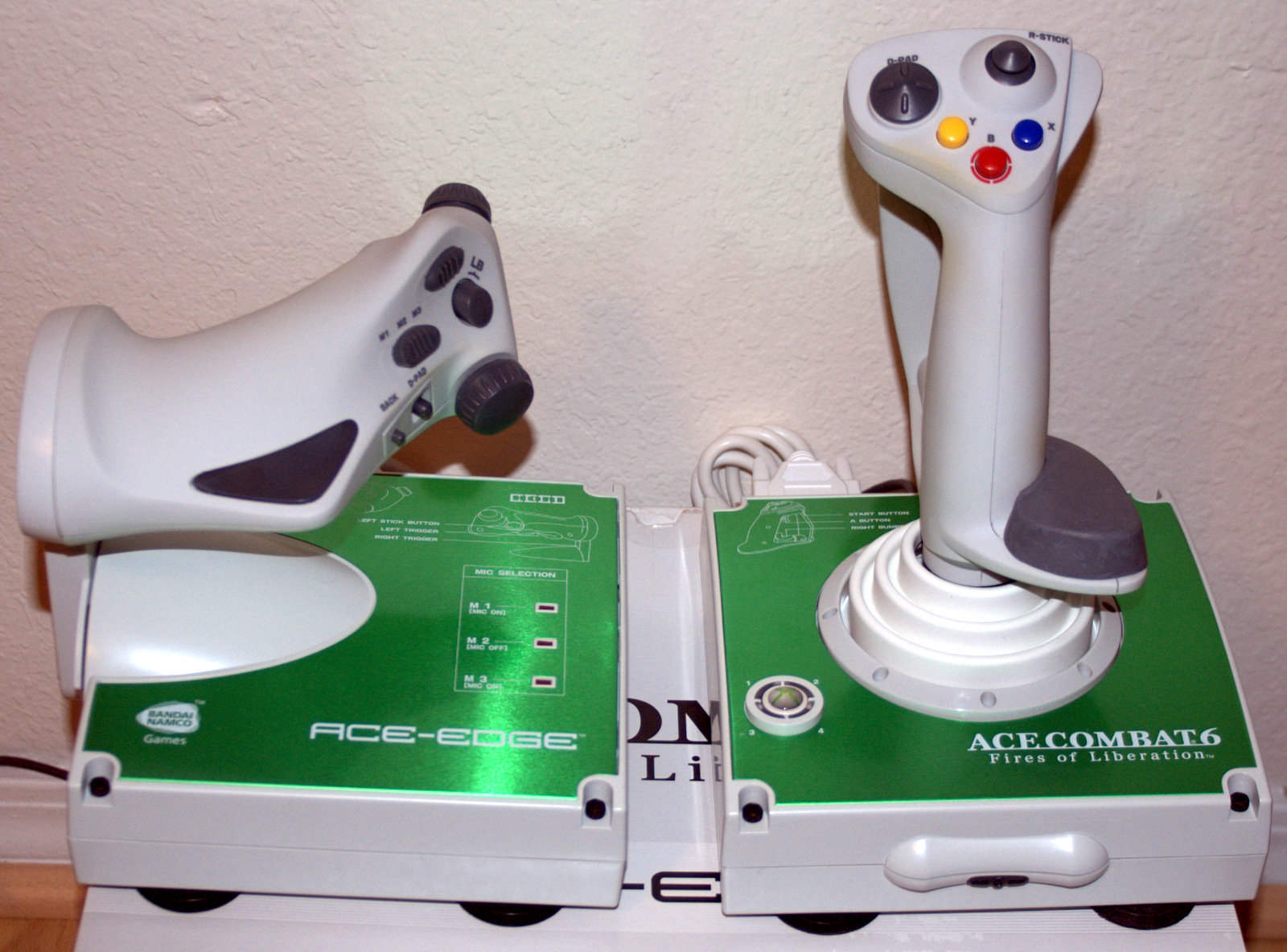
Ace Edge controller

The Ace Edge is a joystick and throttle controller designed specifically for Ace Combat 6. Produced by Hori, it was only made available for purchase in a special-limited edition package of the game. The Ace Edge package was only officially released in North America and Japan. The price of the package was $149.99 US dollars. The package also included an Ace Combat 6 faceplate for the Xbox 360.

It is called "Flight Stick EX" in Japan. It is very similar to the Saitek X45 HOTAS joystick / throttle system popular with PC flight simulation players. The throttle unit is identical, while the control column is slightly different (likely to better accommodate Xbox button maps). The top of the X45 stick featured two 8-way hat switches, one on the left and one at the bottom, and three thumb buttons above them with one under a safety cover; the Ace Edge retains the left 8-way hat switch, but swaps the positions of the thumb buttons and the second hat switch, with three of the Xbox controller's four main buttons in a rearranged order (Y, B and X, left to right, A being the trigger) below an analog mini-stick rather than a second hat switch. The stick also featured both a flexible sleeve over the shaft and spring, and a wrist pad, neither present on the Saitek X45.

== Reception ==
Reception

Aggregate score
Aggregator	Score
Metacritic	80/100 (54 Reviews)

Review scores
Publication	Score
Electronic Gaming Monthly	6.5, 6.5, 8.0
Famitsu	36/40
Game Informer	8.75/10
GameSpot	8.5/10
GameSpy	4/5
IGN	8.4/10
Official Xbox Magazine (US)	8.5/10

The game received generally positive reviews from critics, albeit slightly lower than the previous games. Game review aggregators GameRankings and Metacritic gave the game a rating of 81.57% and 80/100, respectively.

TeamXbox gave it an 8.8/10 rating, while X-Play rated it a 4/5. In part due to its Xbox 360 exclusivity, the game only sold 700,000 copies, the lowest of any mainline entry in the Ace Combat series.

During the 11th Annual Interactive Achievement Awards, Ace Combat 6 received a nomination for "Strategy/Simulation Game of the Year" by the Academy of Interactive Arts & Sciences.
