= Ace Combat X: Skies of Deception =

2006 video game

- Developers: Namco Bandai Games; Access Games
- Publishers: WW: Namco Bandai Games (Note: Released under the Namco label outside North America); EU: Sony Computer Entertainment
- Director: Masanori Kato
- Designer: Masanori Kato
- Writer: Tamio Kanaji
- Composers: Akira Yamasaki; Hitoshi Akiyama; Seiji Koike; Maiko Iuchi
- Series: Ace Combat
- Platform: PlayStation Portable
- Release: NA: October 23, 2006; JP: October 26, 2006; EU: November 8, 2006; AU: November 16, 2006
- Genre: Air combat simulation
- Modes: Single-player, multiplayer

Ace Combat X: Skies of Deception (Note: Japanese: エースコンバットX スカイズ・オブ・デセプション, Hepburn: Ēsu Konbatto Ekkusu Sukaizu obu Desepushon) is a 2006 combat flight simulation video game for the PlayStation Portable. It is the first installment of the Ace Combat franchise for the PlayStation Portable, and the second for a handheld game system.

== Development ==
=== Music ===
The music in the game was composed by Akira Yamasaki, Hitoshi Akiyama, Seiji Koike, and Maiko Iuchi. Yuji Takenouchi was approached to compose music for the game and initially accepted the offer, but he was managing a school at the time, and was unable to compose due to the scale of the project. He suggested Yamasaki as a composer, acting as a supervisor instead.

On January 7, 2026, Bandai Namco Game Music published a digital soundtrack for the game.

== Gameplay ==
In the game's campaign mode, the player plays the role of the flight lead in Gryphus Squadron, of the Aurelian Air Force. The game is broken down into missions which involve various combat objectives, such as attacking ground targets, air targets, or a mix of the two. The "Free Mission" mode allows levels unlocked in the campaign mode to be replayed to achieve a higher rank or gain points for the purchase of planes or equipment.

Ace Combat X also includes a multiplayer mode, using ad-hocwireless to connect up to four players. There are six multiplayer modes: Dogfight, Base Attack, Air Superiority, Beacon Battle and Escort Mission.

The game is a mix of arcade action and flight simulation, making it semi-realistic. There are two types of controls: novice and normal. The novice controls are easy to learn and are making the game like an arcade title. The normal controls will be using both the analog nub and the d-pad for the more realistic sim-like experience.

The player can choose from many real planes and over ten fictional planes, where the more advanced planes have to be unlocked first. The player can choose from variety of different viewpoints, including a third-person behind the plane perspective, and a first-person view that can be displayed from within the cockpit (showcases the interiors of all the planes in the game) or simply with a HUD.

=== Unlockables and credits ===
In single-player mode, new planes, medals, weapons, parts, paint schemes and bonus missions can be unlocked, where they can be purchased in the hangar afterwards. At the completion of each mission, a rank and points are awarded based on the completion time and enemies destroyed. They can be used for the new planes, special weapons or the unique unlockable parts which can change the performance and stats (Speed, Air-to-Air, Air-to-Ground, Mobility, Stability, and Defense). Medals are awarded for meeting certain conditions in either campaign or free mission mode, such as providing damage or destroying a number enemies. Each mission or level also contains a "star" unit and an "ace" unit. Destroying the star unit unlocks weapons and equipment, while defeating the ace unlocks a paint scheme.

=== Missions ===
The player can choose their own route through the campaign, which affects how the game progresses. There are points where missions branch out into multiple paths, marking segments of the game. By choosing which missions to take on, players can shape the course of the missions that are being played after by triggering or not triggering certain events (shorter time limit due to limited fuel or removing enemies that could have appeared otherwise). Certain bonus stages are also unlocked by taking a particular campaign path.

Most of the missions in the game are laid out as simply "search-and-destroy", where the player must engage a target and destroy it within a time limit; the only variations to this layout is whether the targets are air-to-air or air-to-ground (land or sea).

There are four levels of difficulty: Easy, Normal, Hard, and the unlockable Ace level. The difficulty mode affects how many enemies are in a stage, how accurate the enemies are, how much damage the enemies and the player's airplane can take.

== Plot ==
Throughout the various cutscenes, the story is narrated by Albert Genette, a reporter sent on assignment to cover the conflict. This is the same reporter who covers the Osea-Yuktobania conflict of Ace Combat 5: The Unsung War.

In the year 2020, after years of civil war and internal struggle, the Democratic Republic of Leasath (/ˈleɪsæθ/), under the command of Diego Gaspar Navarro invades its peaceful neighboring country, the Federal Republic of Aurelia. Owing to their Gleipnir Flying Fortress, Leasath overwhelms most of Aurelia within ten days. The remainder of the Aurelian military bands together at Cape Aubrey Airbase and manages to achieve a Pyrrhic victory: they destroy a flight of Leasath bombers, but Gleipnir in turn wipes out most of the deployed Aurelian aircraft. Among the survivors of Gleipnir's attack is the ace pilot Gryphus One, who bears the symbol of "Southern Cross". Following the battle of Cape Aubrey, Gryphus One spearheads an offensive to recapture Port Patterson, a critical supply base and landing area for Leasath's forces. Gryphus One distinguishes himself by inflicting heavy damage on the enemy air force, navy and ground forces.

After the liberation of Port Patterson, the Aurelians set out to liberate the city of Santa Elva and destroy Gleipnir. Depending on the players choice, either the Aurelian navy or ground forces engage Gleipnir. Gryphus One downs Gleipnir over Santa Elva, earning the nickname of "Nemesis" among Leasathians. The demoralized Leasathians hastily withdraw towards Griswall, the occupied capital of Aurelia where the Leasathians have established a defensive ring with Meson Cannons capable of firing particle beams. The player has two choices on the strategic level: One is to destroy the enemy Skylla unit by surprise and face Meson Cannons (at full or half potential) in Griswall. The other is to sneak under the enemy radar jamming coverage, destroy their Meson Cannon components and instead battle the enemy units outside Griswall perimeter. By the time Griswall is liberated, however, Navarro has escaped, but the turn of the battle changes irreversibly.

Albert Genette and the Aurelian intelligence discover the true motives of the war: General Navarro is revealed to not only be Leasath's commanding officer, but also in control of the country's arms industry. Before the war, Navarro stole foreign aid sent by Aurelia to Leasath, and millions in arms deals during the war to fund the development of Fenrir, a next-generation advanced prototype V/STOL multirole aircraft, simultaneously claiming to Leasath's populace that Aurelia was taking advantage of them, turning public opinion against Aurelia. Following Leasath's expulsion from Aurelia, Navarro continued production in Archelon Fortress on a group of islands off the coast of Leasath. In the advance towards the Archelon fortress, the player has the choice of either preventing enemy elite pilots or a cargo of high-power microwave weapons from reaching the fortress. Depending on the player's choices, the siege of Archelon Fortress can end two ways: Either the Aurelian army destroys the fortress while Gryphus One destroys the last Fenrir prototype, or Gryphus One destroys a shock cannon mounted atop the fortress resulting in its destruction. With the world having witnessed the Battle at Archelon, and Genette's publication exposing the war's true nature, Leasathian citizens, infuriated by Navarro's deception, kill him in a mob, or he flees the country before they arrive. Soon after, the war officially ends.

== Reception ==
Reception

Aggregate score
Aggregator	Score
Metacritic	75/100

Review scores
Publication	Score
Eurogamer	5/10
GameSpot	8.2/10
GamesRadar+	3.5/5
GameZone	8.5/10
IGN	8.7/10
Jeuxvideo.com	15/20
Pocket Gamer	4/5
VideoGamer.com	6/10

Ace Combat X: Skies of Deception received "generally favorable" reviews, according to review aggregator site Metacritic.
