= Ace Combat 3: Electrosphere =

1999 video game

- Japanese cover art
- Developer: Namco
- Publishers: JP: Namco; NA: Namco Hometek; EU: Sony Computer Entertainment
- Directors: Takuya Iwasaki; Atsushi Shiozawa
- Producer: Takashi Fukawa
- Writer: Dai Satō
- Composers: Tetsukazu Nakanishi; Hiroshi Okubo; Go Shiina; Koji Nakagawa; Kanako Kakino
- Series: Ace Combat
- Platform: PlayStation
- Release: JP: May 27, 1999; EU: January 21, 2000; NA: March 7, 2000
- Genre: Air combat simulation
- Mode: Single-player

Ace Combat 3: Electrosphere (Note: Japanese: エースコンバット３ エレクトロスフィア, Hepburn: Ēsu Konbatto Surī Erekutorosufia) is a 1999 combat flight simulation game by Namco for the PlayStation. The third game in the Ace Combat franchise, it was released in Japan on May 27, 1999, and internationally the following year. Players fly fighter aircraft and must complete a variety of mission objectives, such as destroying squadrons of enemy planes or protecting a base from an invading unit.

Namco directors Takuya Iwasaki and Atsushi Shiozawa designed Electrosphere to be visually distinct from other combat flight simulators, using Ace Combat 2 as a base for the game's ideas and mechanics. The storyline was designed to be a core aspect of the game, and to serve a proper purpose by directly affecting the gameplay. Electrosphere carries a futuristic science fiction-inspired landscape and world compared to the modern-day theme of its predecessors. The game is known for the drastic differences in content in the Japanese and international releases; Namco intended to retain the Japanese version's two-disc campaign and branching storyline, but due to financial constraints the game was cut down for North America and Europe.

Though it had a small marketing campaign and little promotion, Electrosphere shipped over one million copies. The Japanese release received positive reviews and was seen as ambitious in its design. International releases were more mixed, with critics expressing confusion towards the lack of content and bland gameplay. The Japanese release of Electrosphere has since been re-evaluated, with critics praising its ambition, overarching story, and additions to the series' gameplay formula.

== Gameplay ==
The player locking onto an enemy. To the left is the radar, the speed, and time limit, to the right is the altitude, and the player's missile count and health bar.

Ace Combat 3: Electrosphere is a combat flight simulation video game. Like its predecessors, it is presented in a more arcade-like format in contrast to other flight sim video games. Unlike most other entries in the series, a greater focus on realism was applied to the aircraft's energy conservation, with players having to avoid tight turns and steep inclines lest they burn off airspeed and enter a stall, which were notably difficult to recover from compared to later entries. Players pilot one of 23 aircraft in both releases. On the Japanese release, they may fight across four factions and complete a selection of the game's 52 missions depending on their faction. Only 36 missions are available in the international release, limited to the UPEO side. These missions range from destroying squadrons of hostile planes to protecting bases from enemy attacks. Player performance is graded from an A to D letter scale, which are logged in a chart displayed on the title screen.

Electrosphere adds several new mechanics to the core Ace Combat gameplay. One of these is the ability to fly spacecraft, with one mission taking place above Earth in outer space. Players can watch instant replays of the mission's final moments at the end of each mission, as in Ace Combat 2. The selection of flyable planes is limited by progress and the player's faction. In the Japanese release, missions contain radio chatter from both the player's faction and opposing ones. In the international release, the player only receives radio chatter from their own faction. The radio chatter in the Japanese release features avatar-like images of the characters. The player can rotate their camera 360-degrees around their fighter in order to see what is behind them or get a better view of the level. An automatic search engine which documents relevant information on the game's organizations, locations, characters, and technology, can be accessed between missions. Fully-voiced, animated video messages can be accessed and viewed via a fictional electronic mailbox.

The Japanese release features additional content that is not present in the international releases. The most notable of these are the branching paths: depending on decisions made by the player in certain parts of the game called "Turning Points", the plot will change, leading to one of five possible endings. The story in each of the game's fives branches is made so that they complement each other. Obtaining all five endings opens up the "Mission Simulator", a mode which allows the player to replay any mission with any aircraft and weapon that they have unlocked.

== Synopsis ==
=== Setting ===
Ace Combat 3 is set in the series' fictional universe of Strangereal, where Earth has entirely different nations, geography, and history. Specifically, Ace Combat 3 is set in a partially-noncanonical cyberpunk near future rendition of Strangereal, in which the world's governments have been effectively superseded by multinational megacorporations that wield massive political, economic, and military strength, the two effective "superpowers" being General Resource Limited and Neucom Incorporated ("Neuwork" in the international versions). Both megacorporations, locked into a fierce power struggle in the continent of Usea, eventually declare direct corporate warfare against each other in 2040, prompting the Universal Peace Enforcement Organization (UPEO), an international peacekeeping force with dwindling influence, to respond to stop the Intercorporate War from worsening. A major part of the 2040 rendition of Strangereal is the "Electrosphere", a fictional, advanced successor of the Internet; in the 2030s, advancements in technology made uploading one's consciousness to the Electrosphere possible, causing a rise in transhumanism as well as Ouroboros, a transhumanist terrorist group based out of the airship Sphyrna that believes humanity can ascend to a new plane of existence by uploading their consciousness to the Electrosphere.

=== Characters ===
The characters of Ace Combat 3 include peacekeepers, mercenaries, company men, diplomats, scientists, news presenters, and terrorists. The game is played through the perspective of a silent protagonist named Nemo. The main cast is composed of fighter pilots affiliated with either UPEO, General Resource, Neucom, or Ouroboros. The player, allies, and enemies, may change their allegiance over the course of the game. NPC characters interact with the player via videophone calls, videomail messages, and radio transmissions during gameplay.

=== Japanese version ===
In 2040, UPEO deploys their Special Armed Response Force (SARF), a fighter squadron led by Commander Park that includes Nemo, the player character, and Rena Hirose, a prodigous flying ace, to respond to incursions by Neucom in no-fly zones. Accusing UPEO of supporting General Resource, Neucom launches a preemptive strike on General Resource, initiating the Intercorporate War. To prepare for combat, Nemo undergoes aerial training from General Resource's top ace, Abyssal Dision. Impressed by Nemo's skills during a subsequent mission, Dision asks them to defect to General Resource. If Nemo stays with UPEO, they begin to fight General Resource, who are attacking Neucom. Nemo is later assigned to escort Gabriel William Clarkson, UPEO's Delegate, who is traveling to a conference to mediate a ceasefire, when Commander Park suddenly claims Clarkson is a Neucom spy and orders Nemo to shoot down Clarkson's plane. If Nemo spares the plane, Neucom offers Clarkson protection, and Nemo transfers to Neucom. If Nemo or Rena kills Clarkson, they remain with UPEO.

It is ultimately revealed that the conflict was orchestrated by Ouroboros, led by Dision, who had secretly been "sublimated" into the Electrosphere and made into an AI copy following a cover-up assassination attempt by General Resource aimed at destroying the mind-uploading technology he was testing. Commander Park is also revealed to be a member of Ouroboros who was using SARF to inflame the conflict. If Nemo stays at UPEO, the player, along with wingman Erich Jaeger, eventually break away from UPEO to bring back Rena, an ally who has joined Dision, and to defeat Commander Park, who has allied himself and UPEO with Dision's coup d'état. If Nemo chooses to leave UPEO for General Resource or Neucom instead, different endings will result, in which Nemo either defects to Ouroboros or remains with the corporation and ensures their victory. Regardless of the player's choices, Nemo shoots Dision down in every ending.

After all five endings are completed, scientist Simon Orestes Cohen reveals that Nemo is actually an AI program that Simon has been training to eliminate Dision to avenge the death of his love interest, fellow researcher Yoko Martha Inoue, who was the target of the same cover-up that killed Dision. Despite the non-sublimated Dision having also been a victim, Simon blamed her death on him, potentially due to his romantic affair with her. Satisfied in knowing that Nemo will defeat Dision in any possible scenario, Simon ends the simulation and releases Nemo into the real world.

=== International version ===
Due to development constraints, the plot in the international versions of Ace Combat 3 was heavily cut down, with characters, backstory, and its multiple endings being completely removed. This version lacked voice acting and the majority of animated cutscenes present in the Japanese release, with the non-gameplay story elements being told through text slideshows between major missions.

Nemo, a human pilot flying for UPEO, deploys to fight off Neuwork's attacks on General Resource. It is eventually revealed that Ouroboros precipitated the conflict, led by a rogue AI developed by Neuwork codenamed "Aurora". Nemo eventually fights and defeats Aurora inside the Electrosphere, bringing the AI threat and the war itself to an end.

== Development ==
Electrosphere's futuristic landscapes were inspired by a combination of 1970's-esque city designs and contemporary architecture.

Ace Combat 3: Electrosphere began development in 1998 following the critical and commercial success of Air Combat and Ace Combat 2. Directors Takuya Iwasaki and Atsushi and producer Takashi Fukawa led a team of other Namco employees during production, most of whom had worked on Ace Combat 2. The directors wanted the third entry to be far more ambitious than its predecessors in both content and presentation. The team focused primarily on making the storyline a key mechanic, which would change and affect the gameplay based on player progress and decision. Storylines in previous Ace Combat games were seen as unimportant and did not have a direct effect on the gameplay itself; this decision was to help make the story feel like an integral part of the game and to serve an actual purpose. Drama television shows and the game R4: Ridge Racer Type 4 (1998) served as inspiration for this idea. Graphic designer Minoru Sashida, who worked on the arcade game Techno Drive, designed the game's menu interface.

During development, the team worked to make Electrosphere visually distinct from other combat flight simulators and create new technological breakthroughs. This led to the game's futuristic, science fiction setting and world, which was created through combining 1970s city designs and modern-day architecture. The developers used Ace Combat 2 as a basis for the game, leading to Electrosphere borrowing many of its ideas and concepts. Hardware limitations of the PlayStation and the team's limited skills made them skeptical of their vision and world being implemented. Its size forced it to be split across two discs. The console had difficulties rendering maps due to their size, which made the game difficult to program. Programmer Kenji Nakano created a workaround to this problem by rendering far-away objects with far fewer polygons than they were up-close (level-of-detail), which took two months to implement. Cutscene animations were provided by Production I.G, featuring dark shadows and contrasting lines. To give the game the illusion of time passing, a day-to-night cycle was implemented.

Tetsukazu Nakanishi, who had previously contributed tracks to Ace Combat 2, served as the lead composer and sound director of Electrosphere, which features a techno and electronica soundtrack. While previous games mostly featured melodic upbeat music akin to funk rock, the soundtrack features more emphasis on sound design than melodic elements, which Nakanishi felt fits the game's atmosphere and design. Other tracks in the game were composed by Koji Nakagawa, Kanako Kakino, Hiroshi Okubo, and Go Shiina, along with one contribution from Tomoko Tatsuta. Kakino incorporated elements of world music into her tracks to express nature and life, while sticking to the sound direction. Shiina extensively used an arpeggiator for his tracks, which he found very enjoyable to use. On May 27, 2024, the game's 25th anniversary, a remastered release of Ace Combat 3's soundtrack was published on streaming platforms.

== Release ==
Namco announced Ace Combat 3: Electrosphere in August 1998. The company remained quiet about the game, making minimal comments during that year's Tokyo Game Show. The company broke the silence in November, opening up a website and showing conceptual artwork to video game publications. Only a single level and a select few aircraft were revealed. Namco announced it was slated for a release in the first half of 1999 in Japan. A small sample of video footage from the game was presented in a bonus disc shipped out with the Japanese release of Ridge Racer Type 4. Famitsu reported that the game was roughly 80% complete by January 1999. After months of secrecy, Namco demonstrated Electrosphere at the 1999 Tokyo Game Show, presented alongside World Stadium 3, Dragon Valor, and the Dreamcast conversion of Soulcalibur, taking up most of the Namco's booth. Ace Combat 3: Electrosphere was published on May 27, 1999, in Japan by Namco Inc. It contained a 26-page instruction manual and a 30-page promotional booklet called the Ace Combat 3 Electrosphere - Portfolio Photosphere, which details the game's setting, characters, and some of the fictional aircraft featured in the game. Also released was Ace Combat 3: Electrosphere Direct Audio with AppenDisc (a portmanteau of 'appendix' and 'disc') which contained the full game soundtrack as well as supplemental story footage and a 'deadcopy' save file which could be used to access the Mission Simulator mode. On December 7, 2000, it was re-released in Japan under the PlayStation the Best line of budget titles.

For the North American release, Namco Hometek Inc. removed all characters and considerably altered the original story-line, keeping only the inter-corporate conflict intact. Electrosphere was released in Europe on January 21, 2000, and in North America on March 7.

== Localization ==
Frognation, a Japanese dubbing company, was contracted to assist in production of the localization process. They contacted Agness Kaku, a translator known for her work on games such as Metal Gear Solid 2: Sons of Liberty and D2, to help translate the game. She recalled doing a demo translation based on the original Japanese storyline, but because of funding being cut Namco America scrapped the translation entirely and chose to completely re-do the plot for overseas audiences; this included removing the multiple endings, branching story paths, and almost half of the missions. It was also slightly altered to fit onto a single disc. While an official reason was not given for the cut of funds, Kaku believes it was due to the game not selling as well as Namco hoped in Japan, which gave the American division little hope in it being successful either.

Namco presented the game at the 1999 Electronic Entertainment Expo (E3) exposition to mostly positive coverage. Before the funding was cut for the translation, Namco had already begun advertising the game's interconnected storyline. According to Kaku, when Namco stated that the American release would be heavily cut down and omit the original Japanese storyline, it was met with backlash from fans and publications, causing interest in the game to severely diminish when it was ready to ship.

A text-only fan translation covering one of the game's five routes was uploaded to GameFAQS in June 2000. In 2009, a fan-translation team called "Project NEMO" began work on a text-only English translation for all 52 missions, reaching completion in mid-2010. In December 2016, the same team published patches that translated the game's story. Starting in 2023, Project NEMO has released yearly revisions, with the latest one being version 0.9b2.

In December 2021, a localization group called the "Load Word Team" translated the game in the Italian language. In May 2023, the same team also completed translation to the English and Spanish languages.

== Reception ==
Reception

Aggregate score
Aggregator	Score
GameRankings	74%

Review scores
Publication	Score
AllGame	3.5/5
Edge	6/10
Electronic Gaming Monthly	6/10 (Note: Two critics of Electronic Gaming Monthly gave the game each a score of 5.5/10, one gave it 7/10, and the other gave it 6/10.)
EP Daily	6/10
Famitsu	31/40
Game Informer	7.75/10
GameFan	(J.B.) 91% (T.R.) 89%
GameSpot	(JP) 6.8/10 (NA) 6.2/10
IGN	9/10
Next Generation	2/5
Official U.S. PlayStation Magazine	3/5
The Sydney Morning Herald	4.5/5

The Japanese version received mostly positive reviews. Staff from Famitsu appreciated the game for its "overwhelming" graphics and deeper storyline, in addition to its realism. An Official Czech PlayStation Magazine reviewer had a similar response, enjoying its futuristic approach, realistic graphics, and refined gameplay. In an early preview, James Mielke of GameSpot commented that the game, while it was not as fun as Ace Combat 2, had the same ambitious design as R4: Ridge Racer Type 4, with personality-driven cutscenes, sleek fighter craft designs, and detailed graphics. Edge staff members highlighted its branching storyline, stating that it makes the game more involving and rewarding than its predecessors.

In contrast, reviews for the North American and European releases were met with a considerably more mixed response. Because international versions had a significantly lower amount of content than in the Japanese version, reviewers showed confusion and disappointment towards the lack of missions and a proper storyline for diminishing the game as a whole. Mielke presented a radically different response to Electrosphere from his preview, writing that its removal of content from the Japanese version and linear approach made the game feel inferior to its predecessor Ace Combat 2. NextGen's Eric Bratcher agreed that without its branching level system and additional campaign, it felt boring to play and not nearly as refined as earlier Ace Combat games. Mandip Sandhu of The Electric Playground showed disappointment towards the plot and bland cutscenes for creating a story that had little to no significance over the game itself. Dean Evans of Official UK PlayStation Magazine said that it felt more like a PC flight simulator than an Ace Combat game, mockingly writing: "Namco prove that yes, it is possible to recreate PC-style flight sim graphics on the PlayStation. But, unfortunately, they forgot to include a game to go with them." Not all reviewers expressed criticism over the game: Sam Bishop of IGN and Dr. Zombie of GamePro both praised the gameplay for being solid and energetic, (Note: GamePro gave the game three 4/5 scores for graphics, control, and fun factor, and 3.5/5 for sound in one review.) with Bishop in particular commenting that it "delivers the same action-packed air combat experience that you've come to expect from the series, and does it with an unmatched style and flair that's never over the top". Jeuxvideo.com's Kornifex said that it had the same refinement as Ace Combat 2, with a large selection of fighters and varied missions.

Critics agreed that Electrosphere posed "gorgeous" graphics with plenty of detail. Bishop said it had an amazing sense of detail and proved to be one of the game's strong points. Dr. Zombie and Mielke both agreed, with the former author in particular saying that it had a unique blend of realistic and arcade-esque graphics. Mielke also liked the game's high production values. Sandhu complemented its visuals for their high amount of detail, as did Kornifex and Evans. Reviewers also praised the game's control scheme for being responsive and easy to use, with Dr. Zombie specifically pointing out its realism to actual aircraft. Kornifex also praised the game's usage of the PlayStation DualShock controller to great effect, namely with its rumble feature and smoothness. Electrosphere's soundtrack, usage of instant replays, and considerable lack of slowdown were also the subject of praise. Although Bratcher praised the graphical style and gameplay mechanics, he felt it ultimately fell short compared to its predecessors, writing that the game "has too many arcade elements to be a serious flight sim. Unfortunately, it's also too boring to be a great arcade-style dogfighter." In another GamePro review, however, Lamchop said that the game "is not for the gamer who just wants to jump in and shoot things out of the sky. On the other hand, if you want to take a shot at handling a multition aircraft, this may be a flight booked for you." (Note: GamePro gave the game two 3.5/5 scores for graphics and sound, and two 4/5 scores for control and fun factor in another review.)

Commercially, the game under-performed, and was not as big of a hit as Namco hoped it would be. It was commercially unsuccessful in North America and pulled fewer units than previous entries. By 2008, Electrosphere had shipped 1.164 million units worldwide, barely surpassing Ace Combat 2's 1.092 million worldwide shipment.

The game won the award for "Shooter" in both Editors' Choice and Readers' Choice at IGN's Best of 2000 Awards.

=== Retrospective feedback ===
Ace Combat 3 has received better feedback in retrospect, with critics identifying its ambitious design and story. In celebration of the game's 20th anniversary in 2019, Game*Spark retrospectively compared the complex storyline of Electrosphere to that of Final Fantasy VII and Ridge Racer Type 4, praising its branching path system for having a meaningful, interesting impact on the plot as a whole. They also liked the game's futuristic atmosphere and theme, a drastic departure from other Ace Combat games. Game*Spark further stated that Electrosphere was one of the best and most unique games in the series, showing disappointment towards the lack of a modern digital release on platforms such as PlayStation Network.

Sebastiano Pezzile, a writer for Player.it, reviewed the game in 2019 to commemorate the launch of Ace Combat 7: Skies Unknown. He compared its story and visual style to that of Neon Genesis Evangelion and Ghost in the Shell, enjoying its larger storyline for being far darker than its predecessors. While Pezille praised its Wipeout-influenced soundtrack, he was critical of the international version for being inferior to Air Combat and Ace Combat 2 from a content standpoint. Writing for GameRevolution, Tyler Treese also expressed his disappointment in the game's international release, believing it made for one of the worst attempts at video game localization.
