= Ace Combat 5: The Unsung War =

2004 video game

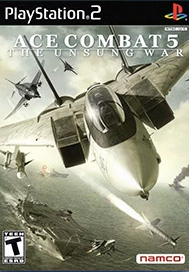
- NTSC-U cover art featuring the F-14 Tomcat and F-4 Phantom II; the PAL cover art features a Eurofighter Typhoon or a Dassault Rafale instead of the F-14 depending on country
- Developer: Namco
- Publishers: JP: Namco; NA: Namco Hometek; EU: Sony Computer Entertainment
- Director: Kazutoki Kono
- Producer: Hiroyuki Ichiyanagi
- Designer: Natsuki Isaki
- Writer: Sunao Katabuchi
- Composers: Keiki Kobayashi; Tetsukazu Nakanishi; Hiroshi Okubo; Junichi Nakatsuru
- Series: Ace Combat
- Platforms: PlayStation 2 PlayStation 4
- Release: PlayStation 2: JP: October 21, 2004; NA: October 25, 2004; EU: February 18, 2005; PlayStation 4: WW: January 18, 2019
- Genre: Combat flight simulation
- Mode: Single-player

Ace Combat 5: The Unsung War (Note: In Japanese: Ace Combat 5: The Unsung War (エースコンバット5 ジ・アンサング・ウォー, Ēsu Konbatto Go Ji Ansangu Wō). Known in the PAL region as Ace Combat: Squadron Leader.) is a 2004 combat flight simulation game developed and published by Namco for the PlayStation 2. It is the fifth entry in the Ace Combat series, serving as a sequel to Ace Combat 04: Shattered Skies, and is likewise also set in the series' fictional universe of Strangereal. Set in 2010, the game's story follows fighter pilot "Blaze" and his squadron as they fight in a war between the superpower states of Osea and Yuktobania, and uncover the major conspiracy fueling the conflict that threatens to destroy both belligerents.

Although most of Ace Combat 5's gameplay remains similar to that of its predecessor, Ace Combat 04, several notable additions were made, including a more action-centric arcade mode and the ability for the player to command their wingmen. The multiplayer mode present in previous titles, however, was scrapped during development. A limited number of the games were bundled with the Hori Flightstick 2 accessory.

Ace Combat 5 released to generally favorable reviews, although critics noted that the game was not the "revolutionary step forward for the series" that Ace Combat 04 was. The game was rereleased as a port to the PlayStation 4 in 2019, as part of a pre-order bonus for Ace Combat 7: Skies Unknown.

== Gameplay ==
The player firing missiles at an enemy fighter

Ace Combat 5 is a combat flight simulation game in which the player pilots military aircraft to complete various objectives, including dogfighting enemy aircraft, conducting airstrikes, providing close air support, and battling massive high-tech superweapons. The game forgoes a realistic flight model in favor of more accessible gameplay.

During the single-player campaign, players are given a briefing prior to each mission, where they are informed of the situation, their objectives, the opposition, and environmental and terrain considerations, over a map of the mission area. Players complete missions by destroying enemy targets and completing specific objectives. Computer-controlled wingmen and allies accompany the player in each mission, providing exposition and combat support.

Ace Combat 5 features more than 50 licensed real-world aircraft, alongside several fictional models; these are categorized into fighters, attackers, and multiroles based on their design and role, with their own specializations and vulnerabilities. In combat, players can use their aircraft's guns and missiles against all targets, as well as a limited selection of situational special weapons for each aircraft suiting their role, including air-to-air missiles, air-to-ground weaponry, and anti-ship missiles, among others, though only one special weapon can be equipped at a time. Players can select aircraft and special weapons for themselves and their wingmen before each mission. Most aircraft can be purchased with credits, which are earned by completing missions, while others are unlocked while destroying a certain amount of enemies using particular aircraft.

The game's campaign features the "Wingman Command" mechanic, which allows players to order their wingmen to concentrate attacks on certain enemy targets, disperse to freely attack nearby enemies on their own, cover the player and defend them from enemies, and permit or disallow using their limited payload of special weapons. Wingmen can be assigned specific aircraft before beginning a mission. Completing missions awards credits that can be used to purchase aircraft, while certain missions feature minigames such as aerial refueling for small credit bonuses.

== Plot ==
Ace Combat 5 is set in the series' fictional universe of Strangereal, where Earth has entirely different nations, geography, and history. The plot of the campaign revolves around a conflict fought between Osea and Yuktobania, the two superpowers of the world.

In late 2010, Yuktobania unexpectedly declares war against Osea. Their initial advantage over the Osean military is gradually chipped away by Wardog Squadron, a small Osean auxiliary squadron posted to the front lines. Wardog's successes, including their sinking of Yuktobania's submersible aircraft carrier Scinfaxi, turn the tide of the war in favor of Osea, and their presence in battle increases the morale of Osean forces whilst striking fear into the Yuktobanians; this draws the interest of Albert Genette, a war correspondent posted to Wardog's island air base.

During a mission, the 8492nd Squadron, ostensibly an Osean squadron operating nearby, attacks a civilian college in Yuktobania, and Wardog is deemed responsible. Wardog clears their names by repelling Yuktobanian reprisal attacks and sinking a second Yuktobanian submersible carrier, the Hrimfaxi, but during the court-martial proceedings it is revealed that the 8492nd does not exist in official military records; Wardog begins to suspect they were framed. During a flypast at an Osean political rally, a Yuktobanian ambush and interference from the 8492nd results in one of Wardog's pilots being killed. Wardog's suspicions are confirmed when unmarked aircraft ambush the squadron during an aerial refueling, which they narrowly escape.

Squadron mechanic Peter N. "Pops" Beagle informs Genette of the "Grey Men", an ultranationalist paramilitary from Belka, a nation bitterly defeated in a war of aggression 15 years prior to the game's events, (Note: Later depicted in Ace Combat Zero: The Belkan War) and suspects their involvement in the conspiracy against Wardog. Pops and Genette take their concerns to the base commander but learn his adjutant, an ally of the 8492nd and the Grey Men, has framed them and Wardog of being enemy spies. The commander orders their arrest, but they flee the base in stolen training jets with the assistance of Pops, who is revealed to be Wolfgang Buchner, a former Belkan pilot who defected to Osea and is opposed to the Grey Men.

Aided by Osean naval aviators from a friendly aircraft carrier, Wardog fakes their deaths and reforms as the independent Razgriz Squadron, named after a legend in Strangereal. Razgriz rescues the Osean and Yuktobanian heads of state from captivity and finds false-flagged Osean and Yuktobanian aircraft in Belkan territory, confirming the Grey Men conspiracy. It is learned the people of Osea and Yuktobania have become opposed to the war, and that the Grey Men are planning to attack Osea and Yuktobania with nuclear weapons to avenge their defeat and reunite Belka. Razgriz foils their plans, while Osea and Yuktobania join forces to defeat the Grey Men. When the Grey Men hijack an orbital weapons platform, Razgriz spearheads an assault on their control facility, defeats the 8492nd, and destroys the weapons platform itself when it is deliberately deorbited to impact the Osean capital, ending the war and restoring peace between Osea and Yuktobania. After the war, Genette reports that Razgriz disappeared afterward, while Pops retires on Wardog's now-decommissioned island air base.

== Development ==
Namco first announced Ace Combat 5 was in development during the 2002 Tokyo CG Festival, in a presentation focusing upon computer graphics. Later, in 2003, Namco launched an official website promoting "Project Aces", originally thought to be a working title for Ace Combat 5. "Project Aces" was later revealed to be the name for the internal Namco development team responsible for the Ace Combat series; Ace Combat 5 was the first title to directly credit its development to the Project Aces team.

To ensure accuracy in the depiction of the game's aircraft, Project Aces was given permission by participating aircraft manufacturers to examine in person the planes that were to appear in the game. The visual team also made use of satellite images from the Japan Space Imaging Corporation in the development of the game's environments. Moreover, Project Aces incorporated full-motion video into the cutscenes of The Unsung War, as opposed to the still images used in the plot sequences of previous titles.

Hiroshi Tanaka, the Namco localization producer for Ace Combat 5, highlights wingman interaction as one of the key distinguishing features between the game and its predecessors. Tanaka said that the wingman interaction feature introduces a "strategic and fun aspect of battle". Tanaka also stated that because wingmen play a role in the story, the player can become more involved with the characters and the drama than in Ace Combat 04. A third fictional aircraft, the "ADLER" (an attack variant of the "FALKEN" fighter, armed with similar weaponry to the Scinfaxi and Hrimfaxi's submarine-launched burst missiles), was planned but not fully developed due to time constraints.

The background music of the game's main campaign mode is primarily orchestral, although the arcade mode features rock music to complement its missions' more frantic pace. The game additionally features three vocal tracks. One is "The Unsung War", a Latin choral piece performed by the Warsaw National Philharmonic Orchestra that reiterates the "Demon of Razgriz" legend introduced in the game's campaign. Another is "The Journey Home", a recurring song that implies a theme of peace during the campaign. The game also features the licensed track "Blurry" by Puddle of Mudd, which is featured during the game's opening trailer, one cutscene, and the closing credits.

=== Hori Flightstick 2 ===
Officially branded as the Ace Combat Flightstick 2, the Hori Flightstick 2 is a game peripheral specifically designed for Ace Combat 5: The Unsung War. According to Hiroshi Tanaka, Namco and Hori worked together closely to ensure "that the game, the stick, and the controls matched exactly how it should play". Unlike the original Flightstick peripheral designed for Ace Combat 04: Shattered Skies, the Flightstick 2 was released in North America in addition to Japan. In the United States, the accessory was released exclusively as a bundle with Ace Combat 5; only 20,000 bundles were made available in the limited edition offer.

The Flightstick 2 connects to the PS2 through a USB port. Unlike the PS2 DualShock 2 controller, the Flightstick 2 uses a HOTAS (hands on throttle and stick) design similar to that used in actual aircraft. The right hand controls the flight stick, which controls the plane's altitude; the left hand controls the throttle. Buttons, D-pads, and rudder controls are placed directly onto either the flight stick or the throttle. The Flightstick 2 does not offer force feedback, but does have a vibration feature. Although the Flightstick 2 was targeted specifically for use with Ace Combat 5, not all of the buttons on the peripheral are utilized in the game.

Ace Combat 5 is the only game officially sanctioned for use with the Flightstick 2. In a review of the peripheral, IGN commented that although the Hori Flightstick 2 was "nearly perfect in what it does, [...] at the moment it really only does one thing and that's play Ace Combat 5". However, the Flightstick 2 is also compatible with Ace Combat 04: Shattered Skies and Ace Combat Zero: The Belkan War.

== Reception ==
Reception

Aggregate score
| Aggregator | Score |
|---|---|
| Metacritic | 84/100 |

Review scores
| Publication | Score |
|---|---|
| 1Up.com | B+ |
| Computer and Video Games | 6/10 |
| Eurogamer | 6/10 |
| Famitsu | 34/40 |
| Game Informer | 9/10 |
| GamePro | 4/5 |
| GameSpot | 8.3/10 |
| GameSpy | 4/5 |
| IGN | 9.3/10 |

Ace Combat 5: The Unsung War was marked with strong sales, selling over 287,400 copies in Japan and over one million copies in North America, though it undersold Ace Combat 04 by around 800,000 copies. The game was also favorably received by critics. Although reviewers point out that the game is remarkably similar to Ace Combat 04, most also agree that the game's similarity to its predecessor did not detract from its overall quality. According to GameSpot, "this latest installment doesn't do much to change an already-winning formula—but not much was needed to keep this series feeling fresh and exciting".

Overall, critics' reception of the title's gameplay was positive, particularly for the game's intuitive control schemes and large assortment of playable aircraft. The gameplay was also applauded for its "ideal" place between "overtly arcadey rubbish and inaccessible hardcore simulation". On review aggregator website Metacritic, the game has a score of 84/100, indicating "generally favorable" reviews.

Reception of the game's new features, however, was mixed. The game's redesigned "target view" function was decried as "almost broken". Although GameSpy welcomed improvements to the game's radar display, other additions such as wingman commands were seen as "gimmicky" and having little effect on gameplay. The game's arcade mode was described as fun but lacking in features and storyline.

The game's presentation was better received. Various critics praised the way that the game's storyline ties cohesively with the missions, allowing for better and more involving gameplay. GameSpot praised the game for its "captivating storyline". IGN applauded that the game recognizes the player's accomplishments, adding a "sense of worth" to the campaign. Although GameSpy felt that the menu interface was not optimized in terms of usability, it lauded the look of the game's cinematics and briefing screens. Although others believed that the player's responses to wingmen had little effect on gameplay, Game Informer felt that the feature was a "brilliant way to create atmosphere".

The game was acclaimed for its graphics, particularly its improved special and environmental effects and its authentically modeled aircraft, but critics noted that the high level of visual improvement in some areas contrasts with little improvement in others. The game's voice acting received mixed reactions. Although some felt that, taken as a whole, the radio chatter sets the game's atmosphere and creates a "hectic feel", most critics felt that much of the chatter was contextually inappropriate or annoying. GameSpy compared the voice work in 5 negatively with that in 04, feeling that the dialogue seemed "forced" and that sometimes "characters start to blabber just because they can".

== Legacy ==
"First Flight", a background track from a mission in Ace Combat 5, was featured among the songs from Japanese popular culture that were performed in the Parade of Nations during the 2020 Summer Olympics in Tokyo.
