= Call of Duty: Vanguard =

2021 video game

- Developer: Sledgehammer Games (Note: Zombies mode and Multiplayer Ranked Play developed by Treyarch. Vanguard's integration into Call of Duty: Warzone was handled by Raven Software. Additional development work by Beenox, Demonware, High Moon Studios, Activision Shanghai, Toys for Bob and Sumo Digital.)
- Publisher: Activision
- Directors: Dave Swenson; Josh Bridge; Ben Wanat; Greg Reisdorf
- Producers: Mike Syrnyk; Trevor Schack; Mike Mejia; Adam Iscove
- Designers: Robert Pitts; Zach Hodson; Evan Hort
- Programmers: Robert Foster; Jason Bell
- Artist: Joe Salud
- Writers: Stephen Rhodes; Sam Maggs; Tochi Onyebuchi; Brent V. Friedman
- Composer: Bear McCreary (Note: Jack Wall composes the main theme for the Zombies mode, alongside Kevin Sherwood and McCreary.)
- Series: Call of Duty
- Engine: IW 8.0
- Platforms: PlayStation 4; PlayStation 5; Windows; Xbox One; Xbox Series X/S
- Release: November 5, 2021
- Genre: First-person shooter
- Modes: Single-player, multiplayer

Call of Duty: Vanguard is a 2021 first-person shooter game developed by Sledgehammer Games and published by Activision. It was released on November 5 for PlayStation 4, PlayStation 5, Windows, Xbox One, and Xbox Series X/S. It serves as the 18th installment in the overall Call of Duty series. Vanguard establishes a storyline featuring the birth of the special forces to face an emerging threat at the end of the war during various theatres of World War II.

The game received mixed reviews from critics, with praise towards the entertainment value of the campaign and multiplayer, and the graphics, but criticism for its writing, Zombies mode, and lack of innovation. It failed to meet the sales expectations of Activision.

== Gameplay ==
=== Campaign ===
Vanguard's campaign features similar gameplay mechanics previously introduced in Modern Warfare, such as the player being able to mount wielded weapons to flat surfaces, interact with doors and execute takedowns. New gameplay features allow the player the ability to use a more advanced tactical approach in combat such as blind firing from behind cover, breaking through destructible environmental elements or creating new paths to complete objectives by climbing walls.

=== Multiplayer ===
Vanguard's multiplayer mode introduces a new game mode to the series, titled "Champion Hill", a successor to the mode "Gunfight", a 2v2 arena mode previously featured in Call of Duty: Modern Warfare and Call of Duty: Black Ops Cold War. Champion Hill tasks players with surviving as long as possible in a squad-based deathmatch, round-robin tournament. Season 2 of Vanguard introduces "Arms Race", a large-scale game mode where two teams of 12 players attempt to capture five bases, or destroy them; players can also earn cash from kills and complete objectives to buy custom loadouts and killstreaks. A new feature introduced to the Call of Duty series through Vanguard's multiplayer is "Combat Pacing". This allows the player to have more control over the selection of multiplayer game modes through three pre-defined pacing filters favoring different playstyles. As an addition to the returning Gunsmith system, Vanguard's multiplayer features a "Caliber system", which brings greater destructibility and reactive environments to maps through different ammunition types.

As with Cold War, Vanguard is integrated with Warzone, allowing players to progress and use weapons, operators and other cosmetics items across both titles, in addition to the existing Modern Warfare and Cold War items in Warzone. Like prior Call of Duty installments since 2019, Vanguard's multiplayer is also fully cross-platform play compatible, with support for cross-generation gaming regarding eighth and ninth generation home video game consoles.

=== Zombies ===
The cooperative Zombies mode returns in Vanguard, developed by Treyarch in collaboration with Sledgehammer Games. The mode is considered an expansion of the Dark Aether story, and acts as a prologue to Black Ops Cold War's story. At launch, the game features a new map titled "Der Anfang", which combines aspects of round-based survival gameplay with the objective-based gameplay of Outbreak and Onslaught, both new gamemodes introduced in Cold War. Gameplay elements from Cold War return in Vanguard, such as Essence and Salvage currencies, and Dark Aether-powered field upgrades, in addition to classic Zombies gameplay items like perks and the Pack-a-Punch machine. A new gameplay feature, the Altar of Covenants, allows players to purchase randomized buffs every round, allowing a variety in combat builds. Post-launch updates for Zombies feature additional objectives for Der Anfang, including a main quest for story progression, as well as new Covenants and field upgrades. An additional map, "Terra Maledicta", was also added to the game in February 2022 as part of the Season 2 content update. Classic round-based maps were announced for Vanguard in April 2022, with the first map, a remake of the Call of Duty: World at War map "Shi no Numa", released in Season 4. The second round-based map, "The Archon", was released in Season 5, which was also the final map released for the mode.

== Plot ==
=== Campaign ===
NOTE: The campaign story of Vanguard is told throughout various points in time in a non-chronological order.

In August 1941, Australian Army demolitionist Private Lucas Riggs (Martin Copping) is stationed at Tobruk as part of the Rats of Tobruk garrison. After a failed ambush attempt against an Afrika Korps convoy, the Rats are assigned to recover supplies for the British Army. They manage to find intelligence relating to General Erwin Rommel, and destroy an enemy depot in the process, but are detained by British Major Henry Hamms (James Frain) for insubordination. In October 1942, during the Second Battle of El Alamein, the Rats are ordered by Hamms to form a defensive line, but Riggs disobeys the command and tries to retake a hill and call in bomber support with fellow Rat Private Desmond "Des" Wilmont (Nikolai Nikolaeff) supporting him. The two of them succeed, though Des is killed in action. Angered by the disregard for the Rats' contribution to the fight, Riggs punches Hamms out of frustration, resulting in him facing prison time.

In June 1942, U.S. Navy pilot Lieutenant Wade Jackson (Derek Phillips) participates in the Battle of Midway with his tail gunner, Aviation Machinist's Mate 3rd Class Mateo Hernandez (Christopher Rivas), in their Douglas SBD Dauntless, and manages to destroy two Japanese aircraft carriers. In November 1943, during the Bougainville campaign, Jackson and Hernandez are shot down and captured by Japanese soldiers. They are rescued by the 93rd Infantry Division, who later help them acquire an Aichi D3A to assist the division in reclaiming the island.

In August 1942, Red Army nurse Private Polina Petrova (Laura Bailey) witnesses the Wehrmacht invade Stalingrad. She fails to save her father Boris from being executed by the Nazis, but manages to escape with her brother Misha (Mark Ivanir) and several Soviet partisans. Petrova eventually acquires the nickname "Lady Nightingale" for her sniping skills as she pursues Leo Steiner (Ray Proscia), the German commander leading the invasion. In January 1943, Petrova and Misha attempt to assassinate Steiner, but Misha is severely wounded and sacrifices himself to buy Petrova time to escape. Petrova eventually confronts and kills Steiner and his guards, inspiring the citizens of Stalingrad to reclaim the city from the Nazis. She then sets her sights on Steiner's superior, Hermann Freisinger (Dan Donohue), a high ranking officer in the SS.

In June 1944, British Army paratrooper Sergeant Arthur Kingsley (Chiké Okonkwo) takes part in Operation Tonga, where he and the Parachute Regiment help destroy the Merville Gun Battery and several bridges to assist the Allied forces in invading Normandy. Kingsley befriends fellow paratrooper Sergeant Richard Webb (Simon Quarterman), who becomes Kingsley's right-hand man.

Kingsley, Webb, Petrova, Jackson and Riggs, alongside Yugoslav partisan Milos Novak, would eventually be recruited by SOE Captain Carver Butcher (Ron Bottitta) to form the first special operations task force, callsign Vanguard, (Note: As depicted in the Vanguard tie-in comic series.) with Kingsley as its leader. In April 1945, Vanguard hijacks a train to Hamburg in search of intelligence regarding Project Phoenix, a secret Nazi program run by Freisinger. While infiltrating a Nazi submarine, the squad — minus Jackson, who was hidden — is captured by German soldiers, and Novak is bludgeoned to death by Freisinger. Vanguard is delivered to the Gestapo headquarters in Berlin, where Freisinger appoints his underling Jannick Richter (Dominic Monaghan) to interrogate them. Jackson is later captured after attempting to steal a plane at Berlin Tempelhof Airport; Richter responds by executing Webb to demoralize the team.

Being unaware of Project Phoenix's purpose and Freisinger's involvement, Richter attempts to learn more by interrogating Petrova and Riggs about Steiner and Rommel's connection to Freisinger. He deduces that the project was a coup attempt, in order to appoint Freisinger as the new Führer of the Fourth Reich. As Berlin falls under siege by the Red Army following Adolf Hitler's suicide, Riggs breaks out of interrogation and frees the squad, while Kingsley kills Richter to avenge Webb. Vanguard pursues Freisinger through the city to Tempelhof, where they apprehend him and burn him alive. The four board Freisinger's plane, discovering numerous German documents and assets revealing Nazi covert operations worldwide. Kingsley decides to follow up on Project Aggregat, a secret V2 rocket facility, and orders Jackson to fly there.

=== Multiplayer/Warzone ===
In December 1944, (Note: The official Call of Duty blog states that the events of Multiplayer take place after the campaign, making this date erroneous.) Captain Butcher begins to oversee Operation Vulcan, a top-secret Special Operations Executive mission to hunt down Axis soldiers and scientists who fled to the South Pacific. Butcher deploys with Task Force Trident to Caldera Island in pursuit of Nazi activities, but their plane is shot down by anti-air, leaving the three Trident members stranded from Butcher. As the task force attempts to navigate the island, Butcher stumbles upon the entrance to a Nazi bunker at the beach where he crash-landed. The intel recovered from Caldera reveals that the Nazis were working on a new chemical weapon, dubbed "Nebula V". Butcher travels to the Swiss Alps with Task Force Yeti, intending to recover Nebula V from a nearby Nazi fortress. The Yeti members storm the fortress, but are unable to stop the Nazi commander from releasing the Nebula V gas. They barely manage to escape as the gas engulfs the fortress.

The Nazis begin to deploy Nebula V across the world, hitting major cities such as Paris and London, as well as Caldera. In March 1951, Butcher dispatches Task Force Harpy to Caldera to intercept a Nazi arms convoy, where they find a radio emitting a mysterious primal sound. Butcher laments that the release of Nebula V has awakened something powerful near Caldera. The island would eventually become a battleground between two gigantic monsters, the kaiju Godzilla and the gorilla Kong.

As the years go by, the operators under Butcher's command begin to take up mercenary work, in pursuit of Nazi gold and other sources of wealth. In 1976, Butcher leads his own squad, Task Force Immortal, to investigate the crash site of a helicopter carrying a gold shipment, but is met with hostility from Kingsley, who has formed his own mercenary team comprising members of other task forces. Sometime later, (Note: This event is considered non-canon.) returning villains Raul Menendez (Note: From Call of Duty: Black Ops II (2012) and Call of Duty: Black Ops 4 (2018).) (Kamar de los Reyes), Khaled Al-Asad (Note: From Call of Duty: Modern Warfare (2019).) (Michael Benyaer), He "Seraph" Zhen-Zhen (Note: From Call of Duty: Black Ops III (2015) and Call of Duty: Black Ops 4 (2018).) (Judy Alice Lee), and Gabriel Rorke (Note: From Call of Duty: Ghosts (2013).) (Kevin Gage) make an explosive appearance on Caldera.

=== Zombies ===
No.	Title	Original release date
1	"Der Anfang"	November 5, 2021
In March 1944, following the activation of the cyclotron in Projekt Endstation by the Nazis in Morasko, Poland, (Note: As depicted in Call of Duty: Black Ops Cold War.) various ancient artifacts recovered by the SS unit Die Wahrheit are activated, allowing several entities from the Dark Aether dimension to reach out to the real world. One such entity, Kortifex the Deathless (Jason Marnocha), forms a symbiotic bond with Oberführer Wolfram Von List (Kaiser Johnson), Die Wahrheit's commander, and bestows him the power to resurrect the dead. A team of Special Forces operators responds to an emergency broadcast from Professor Gabriel Krafft (Darin De Paul), a demonologist forced to work for Von List, and is drafted into a new battle against Von List and Kortifex's undead army. Krafft assists the operators in battling the undead, by also supplying them with Dark Aether artifacts which allow them to form bonds with four other Dark Aether entities: Saraxis the Shadow (Alexa Kahn), Inviktor the Destroyer (Regi Davis), Norticus the Conqueror (Wally Wingert) and Bellekar the Warlock (Abby Craden), all of whom wish to thwart Kortifex's plan.
2	"Terra Maledicta"	February 4, 2022
The Special Forces operators eventually discover a Dark Aether portal in Von List's office in Stalingrad, where they find a sealed page from the Tome of Rituals, an ancient spell book that was used to summon the Dark Aether entities. While the four allied entities devise a plan to recover the missing page, they also learn that another entity, Vercanna the Last (Jodi Carlisle), has responded to Bellekar's call for help, and is willing to join the fight against Kortifex. Using a portal opened by Vercanna, the operators travel to Egypt, where they continue their fight against Von List's forces and attempt to recover the sealed Tome page. Kortifex sends one of his underlings, Zaballa the Deceiver, to stop the operators from completing their mission. Vercanna guides the operators in recovering the Decimator Shield, a living weapon once belonged to a warrior of Kortifex's Night Legions. Using the shield, they destroy energy orbs chained to the missing Tome page in the Void, allowing them to recover it. Both Krafft and Bellekar conclude that the missing page may have clues as to how they can separate Kortifex's artifact from Von List, severing their connection.
3	"Shi No Numa"	June 22, 2022
The Special Forces operators travel to "Shi No Numa" (lit. translation: Swamp of Death), a Die Wahrheit excavation site where Saraxis's artifact was first discovered. The team learns from Krafft that a relic located here was used to sever Saraxis from her original human host, which they need in order to do the same to Kortifex and Von List. Saraxis, however, has forgotten her earlier memories of the relic, and is unable to help them. Vercanna instructs the team to power up an ancient monolith, which reveals an echo of Saraxis's past. The echo reveals that the relic was a mirror, broken into two pieces. The operators recover the mirror pieces and put them back together. The echo is summoned once more, this time taking the shape of Saraxis. The echo lashes out at Saraxis, revealing that she was once Kortifex's consort; however she was punished by the former for bearing his child, having her memories wiped and herself turned into his servant. The echo attempts to kill the Special Forces team, but fails. As the mirror is fully restored, Saraxis's memories return, making her remember Kortifex's endgame: to seize control of an object called "the Construct".
4	"The Archon"	August 24, 2022
The Special Forces operators return to the dig site in Egypt, where they use the relic mirror to separate Kortifex from Von List. Kortifex renounces Von List and teleports him to Krafft's location, while he travels to the Dark Aether to claim the powers of the Construct. Through Von List and the entities, the operators and Krafft learn that the Construct is an ancient living monolith, which has the ability to grant its powers to individuals and make them its "Archon". They also learn that Kortifex has sought to become the Archon several millennia before, but was rejected by the Construct. The Special Forces team then seeks out and complete three trials, which grants them passage to the Dark Aether to face the Construct. Krafft, upon learning that Von List has murdered his lover Sasha, retaliates by killing him. The operators enter the Dark Aether and battle Kortifex, who has become the new Archon of the Construct. They eventually manage to kill Kortifex and emerge victorious.

== Development ==
Vanguard is the third title developed by Sledgehammer Games in the Call of Duty franchise after 2014's Call of Duty: Advanced Warfare and 2017's Call of Duty: WWII.

After WWII was released, the studio went through a rebuilding process regarding the organisational structure following the departure of the studio co-founders and directors Glen Schofield and Michael Condrey. In an interview made by VentureBeat about the rebuilding and the path leading Sledgehammer Games to develop Vanguard, Studio Head Aaron Halon highlighted that "[...] we love our legacy and what we’ve created, but we also wanted to think about the future of the studio and how we could set ourselves up to be even stronger. [...] we're proud of the decisions we’ve made along the way that have led us to where we're at today with Call of Duty: Vanguard."

Originally the three-year primary developer rotation cycle between Infinity Ward, Treyarch and Sledgehammer Games, in which the model was first introduced in 2012, it was expected to be continued in 2020 with Sledgehammer taking the lead to create a new Call of Duty entry alongside Raven Software. Due to conflicts of interest between the two, responsibilities were shifted to Treyarch as they took control over the project, which resulted in developing Black Ops Cold War in 2020.

During Activision Q1 earnings call in May 2021, it was confirmed that the development of a new Call of Duty game was being led by Sledgehammer Games due for release in Q4 2021. The developer also confirmed this on its official Twitter account. Activision Blizzard President and Chief Operating Officer Daniel Alegre said: "We are very excited for this year's premium Call of Duty release. Development is being led by Sledgehammer Games. And the game is looking great and on track for its fall release. This is a built-for-next-generation experience with stunning visuals across campaign, multiplayer and cooperative modes of play designed to both integrate with and enhance the existing COD [Call of Duty] ecosystem. We look forward to sharing more details with the community soon."

Vanguard is built on an upgraded version of the IW 8.0 engine, that powered Modern Warfare. The game's visuals were developed in part using photogrammetry and new volumetric lighting techniques while also introducing reactive and destructible environmental graphical details and textures with a damage layer system which reacts to bullet impacts hitting different surfaces.

== Marketing and release ==
=== Reveal ===
In August 2021, some insider sources began to leak information about Vanguard prior to its official reveal, including its editions and reveal trailer content. Official social media accounts for Call of Duty acknowledged this leak in a "humorous" fashion, and proceeded to tease the game's reveal. Around the same time, the first teaser for Vanguard went live within Call of Duty: Warzone, where winning players in any given Battle Royale matches may be sniped from afar by Vanguard protagonist Polina Petrova during the extraction cutscene. A week after, the title of the game was announced, alongside a reveal event taking place in Warzone. Players got to participate in a limited-time game mode titled "The Battle of Verdansk" where every player works together to take down a train, before attempting to escape as WW2-era planes drop bombs on them. The reveal trailer was played at the end of the event, before being posted publicly on YouTube and other social media websites.

On August 25, during Gamescom, Sledgehammer Games revealed the first extended playthrough of Vanguard's campaign missions set in the Eastern Front called "Stalingrad Summer". This mission gives an insight regarding the initial invasion of Stalingrad in 1942 from the perspective of Petrova (voiced by Laura Bailey) as she tries to find a way home after an aerial attack while eliminating hostile German infantry search crews.

On September 7, during a nearly 30-minute live broadcast on YouTube, led by the members of Sledgehammer Games development team, creative director Greg Reisdorf, lead designer Zach Hodson, and associate art director Matt Abbott, in-depth details of Vanguard's multiplayer had been revealed, showcasing some components of tactical gameplay, the variations of competitive gamemodes, while emphasizing the details of the newly introduced environmental destruction gameplay features.

==== Absence of Activision branding ====
Following the announcement of Vanguard, viewers observed that any prominent reference to Activision was conspicuously absent from the reveal trailer. This included the first use of "Call of Duty presents..." rather than "Activision presents", and the only mention of Activision being in small print for copyright purposes. Publications attributed the publisher's decision with an attempt to distance itself from Vanguard due to the California lawsuit filed against them, following incidents of sexual harassment within the company. In response to gaming journalist Stephen Totilo, an Activision spokesman said that the change was "a creative choice that reflects how Vanguard represents the next major installment in the franchise".

=== Multiplayer beta ===
An open beta version of the multiplayer was also made available for all platforms in September 2021, presenting a selection of five maps and some multiplayer playlists, such as Team Deathmatch, Domination, Kill Confirmed and Search and Destroy, with the newly introduced Patrol and Champion Hill game modes. Those players who reach Level 20 in beta would receive a weapon blueprint available to use in Vanguard at launch and in Warzone at a later date.

=== Tie-in comic ===
A tie-in comic series had been announced for Vanguard with the official reveal taking place on October 10, 2021, at the New York Comic Con. Attendees at the panel were given a free copy of the first issue, featuring one of the protagonists, Polina Petrova. On November 4, 2021, Activision announced the comic series would be released for free on the official Vanguard website, with the first issue going live the same day.

=== Release ===
The game was released worldwide on November 5, 2021. Pre-orders of all editions grant "early" access to the open multiplayer beta, a cosmetic weapons pack for use in Vanguard, as well as a Mastercraft cosmetic blueprint and the Vanguard character Arthur Kingsley as an operator, both for use in Cold War and Warzone. (Note: The Cold War version of Kingsley is a separate character from the Vanguard version, also added to Warzone in December 2021.) The Ultimate Edition grants access to three additional cosmetic skin packs, plus access to the Battle Pass of a Season for Vanguard (dependent on the time of purchase), and double XP tokens. The Cross-gen Bundle and Ultimate Edition grant console players two versions of the game for use on the previous console generation (PlayStation 4 and Xbox One) and the later generation (PlayStation 5 and Xbox Series S or Xbox Series X). The game also became available on Xbox Game Pass on June 17, 2026, across Ultimate, Premium, and PC tiers.

=== Post-launch content ===
As with Modern Warfare and Cold War, Vanguard's post-launch content is provided free-of-charge, including new maps, game modes and seasonal events, while the game continues to monetize via the battle pass system and cosmetic bundles featured in the in-game store.

In January 2022, Activision announced a collaboration with the anime series Attack on Titan, to commemorate the release of its final season. A cosmetic bundle was released on January 20, 2022, in Vanguard and Warzone, featuring themed weapon blueprints and a skin for operator Daniel Yatsu based on the character Levi Ackerman. On February 22, 2022, a bundle was released for operator Roland Zeimet, this time based on Reiner Braun's Armored Titan form.

In March 2022, Activision released a teaser for an upcoming Vanguard update in April, featuring the addition of Snoop Dogg as a playable character. This marks the second collaboration between Snoop Dogg and the Call of Duty franchise since 2014, when the rapper provided voiceover as a multiplayer announcer in Call of Duty: Ghosts. The "Snoop Dogg Operator Bundle" was released in Vanguard and Warzone on April 19, 2022.

In April 2022, Activision released a story cinematic for the Season 3 content update, which featured a teaser for a crossover with Legendary Entertainment's MonsterVerse franchise. The collaboration was officially announced on April 21, 2022, featuring in-game events and map changes for Warzone, and cosmetic items themed after Godzilla, Kong and Mechagodzilla.

In June 2022, Activision announced a collaboration with the Terminator franchise for Vanguard's Season 4 content update. The collaboration features two new cosmetic bundles, adding the characters T-800 and T-1000, as they appeared in Terminator 2: Judgment Day, as playable operators.

In August 2022, Activision announced a collaboration with The Umbrella Academy comic book series for Vanguard's Season 5 content update. The collaboration features themed cosmetic bundles for the operators Lewis Howard and Wade Jackson, based on the characters Hazel and Cha-Cha.

== Reception ==
Reception

Aggregate score
Aggregator	Score
Metacritic	XSXS: 74/100; PS5: 73/100; PC: 72/100

Review scores
Publication	Score
Electronic Gaming Monthly	3/5 stars
GameSpot	7/10
GamesRadar+	4/5 stars
Hardcore Gamer	4/5
Jeuxvideo.com	14/20
PC Gamer (US)	60/100
PCGamesN	8/10
Push Square	7/10 stars
CGMagazine	7/10

Call of Duty: Vanguard received "mixed or average reviews", according to review aggregator website Metacritic.

IGN's Simon Cardy awarded the game a 7 out of 10, summarizing their review by saying, "Call of Duty: Vanguard's highly polished campaign provides a healthy amount of fun, even if its brief length and lack of variety lead it to fall short of the classic pieces of war cinema it's trying to emulate." Clement Goh of CGMagazine wrote that "Call of Duty: Vanguard falls in the predictable traps of an annual release, but pulls through with a fun campaign and multiplayer at the cost of duller Zombies", also giving the game a 7 out of 10.

Yussef Cole of Polygon criticized Vanguard's retelling of the Second World War, saying that its progressive lens suffered from a superficial sense of diversity and from tokenism, whitewashing both history and the workplace practices of Activision Blizzard the company had received a lawsuit for. He felt the game serves as a "mythmaking vehicle" for the Western allies, and that it skips past the present criticism of the West's "unseemly colonial interventions and wasteful acts of aggression" to "retroactively add Black and brown characters to an overwhelmingly white and Western struggle." John Walker of Kotaku wrote that the game "wants to ride the zeitgeist of progressive representation, without ever giving a moment's thought to just how poorly it rewrites the reality of marginalized people involved in the war." Walker also criticized the game's lack of player freedom compared to 2003's Call of Duty, and while praising the graphics as "astonishing", wrote it was "all for absolutely nothing".

Vanguard's Zombies mode was negatively received by players and critics alike, with complaints about the lack of content compared to past iterations of the mode. Luke Winkie of IGN gave Zombies a 5 out of 10, writing it had "little imagination beyond bigger damage numbers sparking out of the heads of its undead". Writing for GameRant, Richard Warren felt that Zombies fell short in numerous areas, including its use of multiplayer assets, absence of Wonder Weapons, and lack of Easter eggs, the latter of which they considered the "biggest thing that makes Zombies unique".

Following Vanguard's release, players discovered that the Zombies map "Der Anfang" contained scattered pages of the Quran on the floor, some being bloodstained. In response to criticism from players, Activision removed the pages from the game and issued an apology on Twitter: "There was content insensitive to Muslims included in the game, and it has been removed. It was not supposed to exist as it appeared in the game. We deeply apologise."

=== Sales ===
Vanguard was the top-selling game in November 2021 in the United States and the United Kingdom, according to NPD Group. However, sales in the United Kingdom were down 40% from Black Ops Cold War's sales figures. Vanguard was the overall best-selling game of 2021 in the United States. In May 2022, Activision announced that the game had failed to meet their sales expectations, attributing this to the World War II setting and a "lack of innovation".

The PlayStation 4 version of Vanguard sold 28,321 copies within its first week of release in Japan, making it the fourteenth best-selling retail game of the week in the country. The PlayStation 5 version sold 12,754 copies in Japan throughout the same week, making it the fifth bestselling retail game of the week in the country.

=== Accolades ===
Year	Award	Category	Result	Ref.
2022	Visual Effects Society Awards	Outstanding Visual Effects in a Real-Time Project	Won	
2022	25th Annual D.I.C.E. Awards	Online Game of the Year	Nominated	
2022	25th Annual D.I.C.E. Awards	Outstanding Achievement in Animation	Nominated	
2022	25th Annual D.I.C.E. Awards	Outstanding Achievement in Art Direction	Nominated	
2022	18th British Academy Games Awards	Animation	Nominated	
2022	18th British Academy Games Awards	Audio Achievement	Nominated	
2022	18th British Academy Games Awards	Multiplayer	Nominated	
2022	18th British Academy Games Awards	Performer in a Supporting Role (Laura Bailey as Polina Petrova)	Nominated	
2023	65th Annual Grammy Awards	Best Score Soundtrack for Video Games and Other Interactive Media	Nominated	
