= WWII (disambiguation) =

WWII is an abbreviation of World War II.

WWII may also refer to:

- WWII (album), 1982, by Waylon Jennings and Willie Nelson
- WWII (AM) (1987–2011), now WHYF, a Pennsylvania radio station
- Call of Duty: WWII, a 2017 World War II first-person shooter video game
- "WWII", a song by Phinehas from the 2013 album The Last Word Is Yours to Speak

== See also ==
- The Second World War (disambiguation)
- World War II (disambiguation)
- WWI (disambiguation)
- World War III (disambiguation)
