= World War II (disambiguation) =

World War II was a 1939–1945 global war.

World War II may also refer to:

- World War II (series), a book series by Chris Lynch
- World War II, a magazine published by World History Group
- World War II: European Theater of Operations, a board wargame published by Simulations Publications in 1973

== See also ==
- The Second World War (disambiguation)
- WWII (disambiguation)
- The First World War (disambiguation)
- World War III (disambiguation)
