= The Second World War (disambiguation) =

The Second World War was a global war that lasted from 1939 to 1945.

The Second World War may also refer to:

- The Second World War (book series), 1948–1953 series by Winston Churchill
- The Second World War (book), 2012 book by Antony Beevor

== See also ==
- World War II (disambiguation)
- WWII (disambiguation)
- The First World War (disambiguation)
- World War III (disambiguation)
