= National Board of Review: Top Ten Films =

The following is a list of the Top 10 Films chosen annually by the National Board of Review of Motion Pictures, beginning in 1929.

== 1920s ==
1929:

- Applause
- Broadway
- Bulldog Drummond
- The Case of Lena Smith
- Disraeli
- Hallelujah!
- The Letter
- The Love Parade
- Paris Bound
- The Valiant

== 1930s ==
1930:

- All Quiet on the Western Front
- Holiday
- Laughter
- The Man from Blankley's
- Men Without Women
- Morocco
- Outward Bound
- Romance
- Street of Chance
- Tol'able David

1931:

- Cimarron
- City Lights
- City Streets
- Dishonored
- The Front Page
- The Guardsman
- Quick Millions
- Rango
- Surrender
- Tabu

1932:

- I Am a Fugitive from a Chain Gang
- As You Desire Me
- A Bill of Divorcement
- A Farewell to Arms
- Madame Racketeer
- Payment Deferred
- Scarface
- Tarzan the Ape Man
- Trouble in Paradise
- Two Seconds

1933:

- Topaze
- Berkeley Square
- Cavalcade
- Little Women
- Mama Loves Papa
- The Pied Piper
- She Done Him Wrong
- State Fair
- Three-Cornered Moon
- Zoo in Budapest

1934:

- It Happened One Night
- The Count of Monte Cristo
- Crime Without Passion
- Eskimo
- The First World War
- The Lost Patrol
- Lot in Sodom
- No Greater Glory
- The Thin Man
- Viva Villa!

1935:

- The Informer
- Alice Adams
- Anna Karenina
- David Copperfield
- The Gilded Lily
- Les Misérables
- The Lives of a Bengal Lancer
- Mutiny on the Bounty
- Ruggles of Red Gap
- Who Killed Cock Robin?

1936:

- Mr. Deeds Goes to Town
- The Story of Louis Pasteur
- Modern Times
- Fury
- Winterset
- The Devil Is a Sissy
- Ceiling Zero
- Romeo and Juliet
- The Prisoner of Shark Island
- Green Pastures

1937:

- Night Must Fall
- The Life of Emile Zola
- Black Legion
- Camille
- Make Way for Tomorrow
- The Good Earth
- They Won't Forget
- Captains Courageous
- A Star Is Born
- Stage Door

1938:

- The Citadel
- Snow White and the Seven Dwarfs
- The Beachcomber
- To the Victor
- Sing You Sinners
- The Edge of the World
- Of Human Hearts
- Jezebel
- South Riding
- Three Comrades

1939:

- Confessions of a Nazi Spy
- Wuthering Heights
- Stagecoach
- Ninotchka
- Young Mr. Lincoln
- Crisis
- Goodbye, Mr. Chips
- Mr. Smith Goes to Washington
- The Roaring Twenties
- U-Boat 29

== 1940s ==
1940:

- The Grapes of Wrath
- The Great Dictator
- Of Mice and Men
- Our Town
- Fantasia
- The Long Voyage Home
- Foreign Correspondent
- The Biscuit Eater
- Gone with the Wind
- Rebecca

1941:

- Citizen Kane
- How Green Was My Valley
- The Little Foxes
- The Stars Look Down
- Dumbo
- High Sierra
- Here Comes Mr. Jordan
- Tom, Dick and Harry
- Road to Zanzibar
- The Lady Eve

1942:

- In Which We Serve
- One of Our Aircraft Is Missing
- Mrs. Miniver
- Journey for Margaret
- Wake Island
- The Male Animal
- The Major and the Minor
- Sullivan's Travels
- The Moon and Sixpence
- The Pied Piper

1943:

- The Ox-Bow Incident
- Watch on the Rhine
- Air Force
- Holy Matrimony
- The Hard Way
- Casablanca
- Lassie Come Home
- Bataan
- The Moon Is Down
- The Next of Kin

1944:

- None But the Lonely Heart
- Going My Way
- The Miracle of Morgan's Creek
- Hail the Conquering Hero
- The Song of Bernadette
- Wilson
- Meet Me in St. Louis
- Thirty Seconds Over Tokyo
- Thunder Rock
- Lifeboat

1945:

- The True Glory
- The Lost Weekend
- The Southerner
- The Story of G.I. Joe
- The Last Chance
- The Life and Death of Colonel Blimp
- A Tree Grows In Brooklyn
- The Fighting Lady
- The Way Ahead
- The Clock

1946:

- Henry V
- Rome, Open City
- The Best Years of Our Lives
- Brief Encounter
- A Walk in the Sun
- It Happened at the Inn
- My Darling Clementine
- The Diary of a Chambermaid
- The Killers
- Anna and the King of Siam

1947:

- Monsieur Verdoux
- Great Expectations
- Shoeshine
- Crossfire
- Boomerang!
- Odd Man Out
- Gentleman's Agreement
- To Live in Peace
- It's a Wonderful Life
- The Overlanders

1948:

- Paisan
- Day of Wrath
- The Search
- The Treasure of the Sierra Madre
- Louisiana Story
- Hamlet
- The Snake Pit
- Johnny Belinda
- Joan of Arc
- The Red Shoes

1949:

- The Bicycle Thief
- The Quiet One
- Intruder in the Dust
- The Heiress
- Devil in the Flesh
- Quartet
- Germany, Year Zero
- Home of the Brave
- A Letter to Three Wives
- The Fallen Idol

== 1950s ==
1950:

- Sunset Boulevard
- All About Eve
- The Asphalt Jungle
- The Men
- Edge of Doom
- Twelve O'Clock High
- Panic in the Streets
- Cyrano de Bergerac
- No Way Out
- Stage Fright

1951:

- A Place in the Sun
- The Red Badge of Courage
- An American in Paris
- Death of a Salesman
- Detective Story
- A Streetcar Named Desire
- Decision Before Dawn
- Strangers on a Train
- Quo Vadis
- Fourteen Hours

1952:

- The Quiet Man
- High Noon
- Limelight
- 5 Fingers
- The Snows of Kilimanjaro
- The Thief
- The Bad and the Beautiful
- Singin' in the Rain
- Above and Beyond
- My Son John

1953:

- Julius Caesar
- Shane
- From Here to Eternity
- Martin Luther
- Lili
- Roman Holiday
- Stalag 17
- Little Fugitive
- Mogambo
- The Robe

1954:

- On the Waterfront
- Seven Brides for Seven Brothers
- The Country Girl
- A Star Is Born
- Executive Suite
- The Vanishing Prairie
- Sabrina
- 20,000 Leagues Under the Sea
- The Unconquered
- Beat the Devil

1955:

- Marty
- East of Eden
- Mister Roberts
- Bad Day at Black Rock
- Summertime
- The Rose Tattoo
- A Man Called Peter
- Not as a Stranger
- Picnic
- The African Lion

1956:

- Around the World in 80 Days
- Moby Dick
- The King and I
- Lust for Life
- Friendly Persuasion
- Somebody Up There Likes Me
- The Catered Affair
- Anastasia
- The Man Who Never Was
- Bus Stop

1957:

- The Bridge on the River Kwai
- 12 Angry Men
- The Spirit of St. Louis
- The Rising of the Moon
- Albert Schweitzer
- Funny Face
- The Bachelor Party
- The Enemy Below
- A Hatful of Rain
- A Farewell to Arms

1958:

- The Old Man and the Sea
- Separate Tables
- The Last Hurrah
- The Long, Hot Summer
- Windjammer
- Cat on a Hot Tin Roof
- The Goddess
- The Brothers Karamazov
- Me and the Colonel
- Gigi

1959:

- The Nun's Story
- Ben-Hur
- Anatomy of a Murder
- The Diary of Anne Frank
- Middle of the Night
- The Man Who Understood Women
- Some Like It Hot
- Suddenly, Last Summer
- On the Beach
- North by Northwest

== 1960s ==
1960:

- Sons and Lovers
- The Alamo
- The Sundowners
- Inherit the Wind
- Sunrise at Campobello
- Elmer Gantry
- Home from the Hill
- The Apartment
- Wild River
- The Dark at the Top of the Stairs

1961:

- Question 7
- The Hustler
- West Side Story
- The Innocents
- The Hoodlum Priest
- Summer and Smoke
- The Young Doctors
- Judgment at Nuremberg
- One, Two, Three
- Fanny

1962:

- The Longest Day
- Billy Budd
- The Miracle Worker
- Lawrence of Arabia
- Long Day's Journey into Night
- Whistle Down the Wind
- Requiem for a Heavyweight
- A Taste of Honey
- Birdman of Alcatraz
- War Hunt

1963:

- Tom Jones
- Lilies of the Field
- All the Way Home
- Hud
- This Sporting Life
- Lord of the Flies
- The L-Shaped Room
- The Great Escape
- How the West Was Won
- The Cardinal

1964:

- Becket
- My Fair Lady
- Girl with Green Eyes
- The World of Henry Orient
- Zorba the Greek
- Topkapi
- The Chalk Garden
- The Finest Hours
- Four Days in November
- Séance on a Wet Afternoon

1965:

- The Eleanor Roosevelt Story
- The Agony and the Ecstasy
- Doctor Zhivago
- Ship of Fools
- The Spy Who Came in from the Cold
- Darling
- The Greatest Story Ever Told
- A Thousand Clowns
- The Train
- The Sound of Music

1966:

- A Man for All Seasons
- Born Free
- Alfie
- Who's Afraid of Virginia Woolf?
- The Bible: In the Beginning...
- Georgy Girl
- John F. Kennedy: Years of Lightning, Day of Drums
- It Happened Here
- The Russians Are Coming, the Russians Are Coming
- Shakespeare Wallah

1967:

- Far from the Madding Crowd
- The Whisperers
- Ulysses
- In Cold Blood
- The Family Way
- The Taming of the Shrew
- Doctor Dolittle
- The Graduate
- The Comedians
- Accident

1968:

- The Shoes of the Fisherman
- Romeo and Juliet
- Yellow Submarine
- Charly
- Rachel, Rachel
- The Subject Was Roses
- The Lion in Winter
- Planet of the Apes
- Oliver!
- 2001: A Space Odyssey

1969:

- They Shoot Horses, Don't They?
- Ring of Bright Water
- Topaz
- Goodbye, Mr. Chips
- Battle of Britain
- Isadora
- The Prime of Miss Jean Brodie
- Support Your Local Sheriff!
- True Grit
- Midnight Cowboy

== 1970s ==
1970:

- Patton
- Kes
- Women in Love
- Five Easy Pieces
- Ryan's Daughter
- I Never Sang for My Father
- Diary of a Mad Housewife
- Love Story
- The Virgin and the Gypsy
- Tora! Tora! Tora!

1971:

- Macbeth
- The Boy Friend
- One Day in the Life of Ivan Denisovich
- The French Connection
- The Last Picture Show
- Nicholas and Alexandra
- The Go-Between
- King Lear
- The Tales of Beatrix Potter
- Death in Venice

1972:

- Cabaret
- Man of La Mancha
- The Godfather
- Sounder
- 1776
- The Effect of Gamma Rays on Man-in-the-Moon Marigolds
- Deliverance
- The Ruling Class
- The Candidate
- Frenzy

1973:

- The Sting
- Paper Moon
- Bang the Drum Slowly
- Serpico
- O Lucky Man!
- The Last American Hero
- The Hireling
- The Day of the Dolphin
- The Way We Were
- The Homecoming

1974:

- The Conversation
- Murder on the Orient Express
- Chinatown
- The Last Detail
- Harry and Tonto
- A Woman Under the Influence
- Thieves Like Us
- Lenny
- Daisy Miller
- The Three Musketeers

1975:

- Nashville / Barry Lyndon
- Conduct Unbecoming
- One Flew Over the Cuckoo's Nest
- Lies My Father Told Me
- Dog Day Afternoon
- The Day of the Locust
- The Passenger
- Hearts of the West
- Farewell, My Lovely
- Alice Doesn't Live Here Anymore

1976:

- All the President's Men
- Network
- Rocky
- The Last Tycoon
- The Seven-Per-Cent Solution
- The Front
- The Shootist
- Family Plot
- Silent Movie
- Obsession

1977:

- The Turning Point
- Annie Hall
- Julia
- Star Wars
- Close Encounters of the Third Kind
- The Late Show
- Saturday Night Fever
- Equus
- The Picture Show Man
- Harlan County, USA

1978:

- Days of Heaven
- Coming Home
- Interiors
- Superman
- Movie Movie
- Midnight Express
- An Unmarried Woman
- Pretty Baby
- Girlfriends
- Comes a Horseman

1979:

- Manhattan
- Yanks
- The Europeans
- The China Syndrome
- Breaking Away
- Apocalypse Now
- Being There
- Time After Time
- North Dallas Forty
- Kramer vs. Kramer

== 1980s ==
1980:

- Ordinary People
- Raging Bull
- Coal Miner's Daughter
- Tess
- Melvin and Howard
- The Great Santini
- The Elephant Man
- The Stunt Man
- My Bodyguard
- Resurrection

1981:

- Chariots of Fire / Reds
- Atlantic City
- Stevie
- Gallipoli
- On Golden Pond
- Prince of the City
- Raiders of the Lost Ark
- Heartland
- Ticket to Heaven
- Breaker Morant

1982:

- Gandhi
- The Verdict
- Sophie's Choice
- An Officer and a Gentleman
- Missing
- E.T. the Extra-Terrestrial
- The World According to Garp
- Tootsie
- Moonlighting
- The Chosen

1983:

- Betrayal / *Terms of Endearment
- Educating Rita
- Tender Mercies
- The Dresser
- The Right Stuff
- Testament
- Local Hero
- The Big Chill
- Cross Creek
- Yentl

1984:

- A Passage to India
- Paris, Texas
- The Killing Fields
- Places in the Heart
- Mass Appeal
- Country
- A Soldier's Story
- Birdy
- Careful, He Might Hear You
- Under the Volcano

1985:

- The Color Purple
- Out of Africa
- The Trip to Bountiful
- Witness
- Kiss of the Spider Woman
- Prizzi's Honor
- Back to the Future
- The Shooting Party
- Blood Simple
- Dreamchild

1986:

- A Room with a View
- Hannah and Her Sisters
- My Beautiful Laundrette
- The Fly
- Stand By Me
- The Color of Money
- Children of a Lesser God
- Round Midnight
- Peggy Sue Got Married
- The Mission

1987:

- Empire of the Sun
- The Last Emperor
- Broadcast News
- The Untouchables
- Gaby: A True Story
- Cry Freedom
- Fatal Attraction
- Hope and Glory
- Wall Street
- Full Metal Jacket

1988:

- Mississippi Burning
- Dangerous Liaisons
- The Accused
- The Unbearable Lightness of Being
- The Last Temptation of Christ
- Tucker: The Man and His Dream
- Big
- Running on Empty
- Gorillas in the Mist
- Midnight Run

1989:

- Driving Miss Daisy
- Henry V
- Sex, Lies, and Videotape
- The Fabulous Baker Boys
- My Left Foot
- Dead Poets Society
- Crimes and Misdemeanors
- Born on the Fourth of July
- Glory
- Field of Dreams

== 1990s ==
1990:

- Dances with Wolves
- Hamlet
- Goodfellas
- Awakenings
- Reversal of Fortune
- Miller's Crossing
- Metropolitan
- Mr. & Mrs. Bridge
- Avalon
- The Grifters

1991:

- The Silence of the Lambs
- Bugsy
- Grand Canyon
- Thelma & Louise
- Homicide
- Dead Again
- Boyz n the Hood
- Rambling Rose
- Frankie and Johnny
- Jungle Fever

1992:

- Howards End
- The Crying Game
- Glengarry Glen Ross
- A Few Good Men
- The Player
- Unforgiven
- One False Move
- Peter's Friends
- Bob Roberts
- Malcolm X

1993:

- Schindler's List
- The Age of Innocence
- The Remains of the Day
- The Piano
- Shadowlands
- In the Name of the Father
- Philadelphia
- Much Ado About Nothing
- Short Cuts
- The Joy Luck Club

1994:

- Forrest Gump / Pulp Fiction
- Quiz Show
- Four Weddings and a Funeral
- Bullets over Broadway
- Ed Wood
- The Shawshank Redemption
- Nobody's Fool
- The Madness of King George
- Tom & Viv
- Heavenly Creatures

1995:

- Sense and Sensibility
- Apollo 13
- Carrington
- Leaving Las Vegas
- The American President
- Mighty Aphrodite
- Smoke
- Persuasion
- Braveheart
- The Usual Suspects

1996:

- Shine
- The English Patient
- Fargo
- Secrets & Lies
- Everyone Says I Love You
- Evita
- Sling Blade
- Trainspotting
- Breaking the Waves
- Jerry Maguire

1997:

- L.A. Confidential
- As Good as It Gets
- The Wings of the Dove
- Good Will Hunting
- Titanic
- The Sweet Hereafter
- Boogie Nights
- The Full Monty
- The Rainmaker
- Jackie Brown

1998:

- Gods and Monsters
- Saving Private Ryan
- Elizabeth
- Happiness
- Shakespeare in Love
- The Butcher Boy
- Lolita
- The Thin Red Line
- A Simple Plan
- Dancing at Lughnasa

1999:

- American Beauty
- The Talented Mr. Ripley
- Magnolia
- The Insider
- The Straight Story
- Cradle Will Rock
- Boys Don't Cry
- Being John Malkovich
- Tumbleweeds
- Three Kings

== 2000s ==
2000:

- Quills
- Traffic
- Croupier
- You Can Count on Me
- Billy Elliot
- Before Night Falls
- Gladiator
- Wonder Boys
- Sunshine
- Dancer in the Dark

2001:

- Moulin Rouge!
- In the Bedroom
- Ocean's Eleven
- Memento
- Monster's Ball
- Black Hawk Down
- The Man Who Wasn't There
- A.I. Artificial Intelligence
- The Pledge
- Mulholland Drive

2002:

- The Hours
- Adaptation
- Chicago
- Gangs of New York
- The Quiet American
- Rabbit-Proof Fence
- The Pianist
- Far from Heaven
- Thirteen Conversations About One Thing
- Frida

2003:

- Mystic River
- The Last Samurai
- The Station Agent
- 21 Grams
- House of Sand and Fog
- Lost in Translation
- Cold Mountain
- In America
- Seabiscuit
- Master and Commander: The Far Side of the World

2004:

- Finding Neverland
- The Aviator
- Closer
- Million Dollar Baby
- Sideways
- Kinsey
- Vera Drake
- Ray
- Collateral
- Hotel Rwanda

2005:

- Good Night, and Good Luck
- Brokeback Mountain
- Capote
- Crash
- A History of Violence
- Match Point
- Memoirs of a Geisha
- Munich
- Syriana
- Walk the Line

2006:

- Letters from Iwo Jima
- Babel
- Blood Diamond
- The Departed
- The Devil Wears Prada
- Flags of Our Fathers
- The History Boys
- Little Miss Sunshine
- Notes on a Scandal
- The Painted Veil

2007:

- No Country for Old Men
- The Assassination of Jesse James by the Coward Robert Ford
- The Bourne Ultimatum
- The Bucket List
- Into the Wild
- Juno
- The Kite Runner
- Lars and the Real Girl
- Michael Clayton
- Sweeney Todd: The Demon Barber of Fleet Street

2008:

- Slumdog Millionaire
- Burn After Reading
- Changeling
- The Curious Case of Benjamin Button
- The Dark Knight
- Defiance
- Frost/Nixon
- Gran Torino
- Milk
- WALL-E
- The Wrestler

2009:

- Up in the Air
- (500) Days of Summer
- An Education
- The Hurt Locker
- Inglourious Basterds
- Invictus
- The Messenger
- A Serious Man
- Star Trek
- Up
- Where the Wild Things Are

== 2010s ==
2010:

- The Social Network
- Another Year
- The Fighter
- Hereafter
- Inception
- The King's Speech
- Shutter Island
- The Town
- Toy Story 3
- True Grit
- Winter's Bone

2011:

- Hugo
- The Artist
- The Descendants
- Drive
- The Girl with the Dragon Tattoo
- Harry Potter and the Deathly Hallows – Part 2
- The Ides of March
- J. Edgar
- The Tree of Life
- War Horse

2012:

- Zero Dark Thirty
- Argo
- Beasts of the Southern Wild
- Django Unchained
- Les Misérables
- Lincoln
- Looper
- The Perks of Being a Wallflower
- Promised Land
- Silver Linings Playbook

2013:

- Her
- 12 Years a Slave
- Fruitvale Station
- Gravity
- Inside Llewyn Davis
- Lone Survivor
- Nebraska
- Prisoners
- Saving Mr. Banks
- The Secret Life of Walter Mitty
- The Wolf of Wall Street

2014:

- A Most Violent Year
- American Sniper
- Birdman
- Boyhood
- Fury
- Gone Girl
- The Imitation Game
- Inherent Vice
- The LEGO Movie
- Nightcrawler
- Unbroken

2015:

- Mad Max: Fury Road
- Bridge of Spies
- Creed
- The Hateful Eight
- Inside Out
- The Martian
- Room
- Sicario
- Spotlight
- Straight Outta Compton

2016:

- Manchester by the Sea
- Arrival
- Hacksaw Ridge
- Hail, Caesar!
- Hell or High Water
- Hidden Figures
- La La Land
- Moonlight
- Patriots Day
- Silence
- Sully

2017:

- The Post
- Baby Driver
- Call Me by Your Name
- The Disaster Artist
- Downsizing
- Dunkirk
- The Florida Project
- Get Out
- Lady Bird
- Logan
- Phantom Thread

2018:

- Green Book
- The Ballad of Buster Scruggs
- Black Panther
- Can You Ever Forgive Me?
- Eighth Grade
- First Reformed
- If Beale Street Could Talk
- Mary Poppins Returns
- A Quiet Place
- Roma
- A Star Is Born

2019:

- The Irishman
- 1917
- Dolemite Is My Name
- Ford v Ferrari
- Jojo Rabbit
- Knives Out
- Marriage Story
- Once Upon a Time in Hollywood
- Richard Jewell
- Uncut Gems
- Waves

== 2020s ==
2020:

- Da 5 Bloods
- First Cow
- The Forty-Year-Old Version
- Judas and the Black Messiah
- The Midnight Sky
- Minari
- News of the World
- Nomadland
- Promising Young Woman
- Soul
- Sound of Metal

2021:

- Licorice Pizza
- Belfast
- Don't Look Up
- Dune
- King Richard
- The Last Duel
- Nightmare Alley
- Red Rocket
- The Tragedy of Macbeth
- West Side Story

2022:

- Top Gun: Maverick
- Aftersun
- Avatar: The Way of Water
- The Banshees of Inisherin
- Everything Everywhere All at Once
- The Fabelmans
- Glass Onion: A Knives Out Mystery
- RRR
- Till
- The Woman King
- Women Talking

2023:

- Killers of the Flower Moon
- Barbie
- The Boy and the Heron
- Ferrari
- The Holdovers
- The Iron Claw
- Maestro
- Oppenheimer
- Past Lives
- Poor Things

2024:

- Wicked
- Anora
- Babygirl
- A Complete Unknown
- Conclave
- Furiosa: A Mad Max Saga
- Gladiator II
- Juror #2
- Queer
- A Real Pain
- Sing Sing

2025:

- One Battle After Another
- Avatar: Fire and Ash
- F1
- Frankenstein
- Jay Kelly
- Marty Supreme
- Rental Family
- Sinners
- Train Dreams
- Wake Up Dead Man: A Knives Out Mystery
- Wicked: For Good
