= Sledgehammer Games =

American video game developer

Sledgehammer Games, Inc.
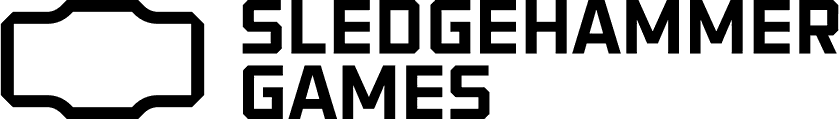
- Logo used since 2023

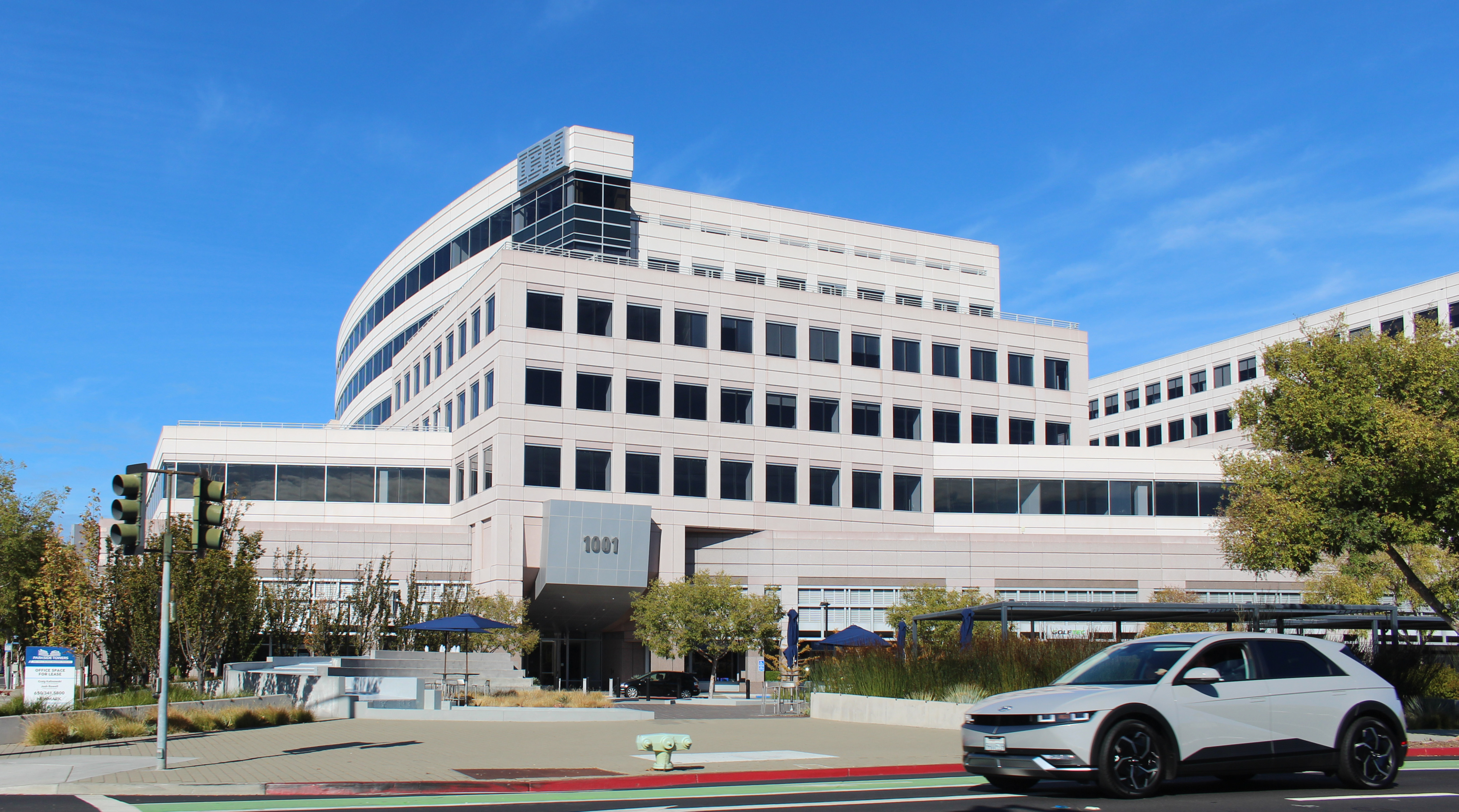
- Former headquarters building in Foster City, California
- Type: Subsidiary
- Industry: Video games
- Founded: July 21, 2009; 17 years ago
- Founders: Michael Condrey; Glen Schofield
- Headquarters: San Francisco, California, US (2026–present); Foster City, California, US (2009–2024)
- Number of locations: 4 (2026)
- Key people: Aaron Halon (studio head); David Swenson (creative director)
- Products: Call of Duty series (2011–present)
- Number of employees: 450+ (2021)
- Parent: Activision
- Divisions: Sledgehammer Games Melbourne; Sledgehammer Games Toronto; Sledgehammer Games Guildford
- Website: sledgehammergames.com

Sledgehammer Games, Inc. is an American video game developer formed in 2009 by Glen Schofield and Michael Condrey. The pair formerly worked at EA Redwood Shores and are responsible for the creation of Dead Space. The studio has developed and co-developed various video games in the Call of Duty series alongside Infinity Ward, Treyarch, and Raven Software. The company is owned by Activision.

In 2024, Sledgehammer Games closed its headquarters in Foster City, California, and employees were to be working from home until the end of that year. In that year, thirty percent of employees were also laid off as part of a restructuring within Microsoft Gaming. In June 2026, the headquarters relocated to a new studio in San Francisco.

== History ==
Sledgehammer Games co-founders Schofield and Condrey worked together at EA Redwood Shores in 2005 on 007: From Russia with Love, with Condrey as director and Schofield executive producer. The collaboration carried forward to Dead Space. The two men had complementary skills and similar backgrounds—middle class with fathers in the construction business.

After founding Sledgehammer Games on July 21, 2009, Schofield and Condrey made Activision a proposal: they would attempt to replicate their success with Dead Space, with a third-person spin-off of the Call of Duty franchise. Activision sat on the proposal for weeks until Activision Blizzard CEO Bobby Kotick offered to bring the studio into the Activision fold. Schofield and Condrey accepted, viewing Activision's independent studio model as an opportunity to preserve the company's creative culture, development methodology and staff, while having the security of an alliance with the industry's largest publisher.

Sledgehammer Games spent six to eight months working on the Call of Duty project in 2009, enough to produce a prototype with about 15 minutes of play. The game would have reportedly expanded the franchise into the action-adventure genre. A legal battle between Infinity Ward, the studio behind the Modern Warfare franchise, and co-founders Jason West and Vince Zampella resulted in the pair's departure. They took several Infinity Ward employees with them to their new company, leaving Activision with about half the staff and a deadline of about 20 months (versus a typical 24 months) to complete the next game in the franchise, Call of Duty: Modern Warfare 3. Activision requested that Sledgehammer Games stop work on the third-person shooter and collaborate with Infinity Ward instead.

Logo used from 2009 to 2021

The offer was a gamble for both sides. Activision was calling on a studio that had not put out a game on its own, while Sledgehammer Games would be abandoning weeks of work in the genre they were most familiar with to take on a punishing schedule in a franchise. The studio first polled its staff and got unanimous approval. "It was a massive risk for Schofield and Condrey's new studio, and one that most outside of the industry never considered", wrote Ryan Fleming in Digital Trends. "The Infinity Ward name was the marquis on the Modern Warfare franchise, but failure to deliver on Activision's golden egg would have resulted in a wave that crippled those in its path. Looking back at the success of that game and franchise as a whole, it is easy to overlook the chance Sledgehammer took."

The collaboration with Infinity Ward marked the first time a co-development relationship would produce a Modern Warfare title, with both companies' logos appearing on the packaging. Despite the companies’ differing histories and development methodologies, GamesTM called the arrangement "a rare symbiotic relationship for such a high-profile game". The two teams first met in the spring of 2010 to compare ideas. There was some overlap: both teams wanted to set the game in Europe and, recalled Schofield, achieve a "payoff on the story that had been told over the last four years."

It was announced in February 2014 that Sledgehammer Games would be developing a Call of Duty title slated for release in 2014. On May 1, Game Informer teased an image of a soldier wearing an exo-skeleton suit. It was also announced that more details, the cover, the full name, and a trailer would be released on May 4. The trailer was leaked which confirmed the release of Call of Duty: Advanced Warfare on November 4, 2014.

On April 21, 2017, Sledgehammer Games and Activision announced their next Call of Duty game, titled Call of Duty: WWII. It was released on November 3, 2017.

In February 2018, Glen Schofield and Michael Condrey left Sledgehammer Games but still worked with Activision. In February 2019, Condrey subsequently left Activision to start working with 2K Games in the Bay Area with 31st Union. Schofield also left in June 2019 to found Striking Distance Studios.

In 2019, while working with Raven Software on Call of Duty: Black Ops Cold War, the 2020 entry in the series, the two teams had differing ideas on the game. This led Call of Duty publisher Activision to bring in fellow developer Treyarch to take over the lead development role for Black Ops Cold War, while Sledgehammer and Raven Software took on partner roles.

Logo used from 2021 to 2023

Sledgehammer opened a new studio in Melbourne, Australia by September 2019. In May 2020, Sledgehammer Games COO Andy Wilson confirmed that the studio was now a multi-project studio with over 200 employees, with plans to hire up to 100 new employees over the next year.

In May 2021, Sledgehammer announced the opening of a new studio in Toronto, Canada. By August 2021, Sledgehammer Games employed over 450 people, with over 150 people working at Sledgehammer Games Melbourne and just over 10 people working at Sledgehammer Games Toronto. In October 2021, Sledgehammer opened a new studio in Guildford in the UK. Sledgehammer lead the development of Call of Duty: Vanguard which was released on November 5, 2021.

Following leaks in Q2 of 2023, Sledgehammer would then develop Call of Duty: Modern Warfare III, the franchise's twentieth release, which was released on November 10, 2023.

Microsoft Gaming laid off 1,900 staff in January 2024. Sledgehammer Games had also been impacted by the layoffs. The studio reportedly lost up to 30% of its staff due to the restructure.

== Operations and culture ==
From 2009 to 2024, Sledgehammer Games' main headquarters operated out of a "custom-designed" studio with an open-plan space, "high-end" development equipment, and a theater in Foster City, California. In June 2026, the company headquarters relocated to a new studio in San Francisco.

By October 2021, Sledgehammer Games had four studios in California, Melbourne, Toronto, and Guildford. New employees are given a challenge coin engraved with the Sledgehammer Games' values. The tradition dates back to a World War I practice of giving soldiers coins with a squadron's insignia that could be used to prove membership.

== Game engines ==
Sledgehammer Games co-developed its first game, Call of Duty: Modern Warfare 3 in 2011, with Infinity Ward using a version of the latter studio's in-house IW game engine called the MW3 engine (IW 5.0). Sledgehammer Games would then utilize its own custom in-house engine for Call of Duty: Advanced Warfare in 2014. Director Michael Condrey said that the majority of their engine was built from scratch. He stated that although there are lines of the old code left from Infinity Ward's IW engine that is used for the Call of Duty series, there are new rendering, animation, physics and audio systems.

With the improved engine, the audio has also been built from the ground up. According to Don Veca, who worked on Advanced Warfare, the audio in the game is very advanced which gives the game a genuine and great feel. Saying that audio doesn't come last as it did in previous titles, Glen Schofield says "We make sure that audio is just as important as anything else and Don's in there from the start with us".

Another objective that Sledgehammer Games accomplished with its in-house engine were the animations. The facial animating system and set in Call of Duty: Advanced Warfare is the same as James Cameron's Avatar: The Way of Water. According to Activision, the new three-year Call of Duty development cycle meant that Advanced Warfare developer Sledgehammer Games was able to create a 'near photorealistic' world unlike any Call of Duty before. An improved version of this engine was also used for Call of Duty: WWII in 2017.

For Call of Duty: Vanguard in 2021, Sledgehammer Games replaced its in-house engine with Infinity Ward's IW 8.0. With the release of Call of Duty: Modern Warfare II in 2022, Sledgehammer Games co-developed the engine with Infinity Ward and Treyarch to be used in future installments of the series in a unified effort to ensure that every studio is working with the same tools. This engine dubbed IW 9.0 was used by the studio for Call of Duty: Modern Warfare III in 2023.

== Games developed ==
=== Lead developer ===
Year	Title	Platform(s)	Notes
2011	Call of Duty: Modern Warfare 3	PlayStation 3, Xbox 360, Windows	Co-developed with Infinity Ward
2014	Call of Duty: Advanced Warfare	PlayStation 3, Xbox 360, Windows	
2017	Call of Duty: WWII	PlayStation 4, Xbox One, Windows	
2021	Call of Duty: Vanguard	PlayStation 4, PlayStation 5, Xbox One, Xbox Series X/S, Windows	
2023	Call of Duty: Modern Warfare III	PlayStation 4, PlayStation 5, Xbox One, Xbox Series X/S, Windows	

=== Support developer ===
Year	Title	Platform(s)	Notes
2018	Call of Duty: Black Ops 4	PlayStation 4, Xbox One, Windows	Assisting Treyarch
2019	Call of Duty: Modern Warfare	PlayStation 4, Xbox One, Windows	Assisting Infinity Ward
2020	Call of Duty: Black Ops Cold War	PlayStation 4, PlayStation 5, Xbox One, Xbox Series X/S, Windows	Assisting Treyarch and Raven Software
2022	Call of Duty: Modern Warfare II	PlayStation 4, PlayStation 5, Xbox One, Xbox Series X/S, Windows	Assisting Infinity Ward
2024	Call of Duty: Black Ops 6	PlayStation 4, PlayStation 5, Xbox One, Xbox Series X/S, Windows	Assisting Treyarch and Raven Software
2025	Call of Duty: Black Ops 7	PlayStation 4, PlayStation 5, Xbox One, Xbox Series X/S, Windows	Assisting Treyarch and Raven Software
2026	Call of Duty: Modern Warfare 4	Microsoft Windows, Nintendo Switch 2, PlayStation 5, Xbox Series X and Series S	Assisting Infinity Ward
