= 31st Union =

American video game developer

- Formerly: 2K Silicon Valley (2019–2020)
- Type: Division
- Founded: February 4, 2019; 7 years ago
- Founder: Michael Condrey
- Headquarters: San Mateo, California, US
- Number of locations: 2 studios (2021)
- Key people: Ben Brinkman (Head of Studios)
- Parent: 2K
- Website: thirtyfirstunion.com

31st Union is a video game development studio of 2K based in San Mateo, California, with a studio in Valencia, Spain. It was founded in February 2019, then provisionally named 2K Silicon Valley, with Sledgehammer Games co-founder Michael Condrey as its studio head.

== History ==
2K announced in February 2020 that the studio was officially named 31st Union, a nod to its San Francisco Bay Area roots and based on California being the 31st state to join the United States. Condrey said in the announcement that the studio's ideals reflected the diversity of California's and Silicon Valley's spirit of innovation in art, technology, and entertainment and cultural representation. Condrey had committed to establishing the culture of this studio on its founding, calling it "a clean canvas", and stressed the importance of diversity in the creative process. In addition to the new branding, 2K also announced plans to open a second studio for 31st Union in Spain.

The current Silicon Valley studio, in addition to Condrey, includes several dozen former Call of Duty / Sledgehammer Games and Dead Space / Visceral Games developers. The studio, as of February 2020, was working on an "ambitious and inspired new IP", and which was to be revealed within 2020, according to 2K.

Michael Chu, previously the narrative director for Blizzard Entertainment's Overwatch, joined 31st Union in July 2020 as their narrative director.

On November 9, 2021, 2K acquired Elite3D, rebranding it as a 31st Union studio and a 2K Publishing arm.

On January 19, 2024, it was reported that 31st Union had let go a small number of employees. The company confirmed it had laid off "less than 10" employees.

On October 17, 2024, 31st Union and 2K announced Project Ethos, a free-to-play roguelike hero third-person shooter, for PC, PlayStation 5 and Xbox Series X/S. In February 2025, Take Two CEO, Strauss Zelnick, shared with Variety that Condrey had transitioned into an advisory role with 2K Games. In October, Condrey was succeeded by Ben Brinkman, who previously served as an executive producer for the Call of Duty series and Apex Legends.
