= World War One (disambiguation) =

World War I was a 1914–1918 global war.

World War One may also refer to:

- The Seven Years' War (1756–1763), between Great Britain and France, described by Winston Churchill as the "first world war"
- World War One (TV series), a 1964–1965 American documentary television series
- World War One (video game), a 2008 strategy video game, published by Ascaron Entertainment

== See also ==
- The First World War (disambiguation)
- WWI (disambiguation)
