= WWI (disambiguation) =

WWI is an abbreviation of World War I. It may also refer to:

- West Wickham railway station, London, by National Rail station code
- Woodie Woodie Airport, Western Australia, by IATA code

== See also ==
- WW1 (album)
- The First World War (disambiguation)
- World War One (disambiguation)
- WWII (disambiguation)
- World War III (disambiguation)
