= Michael Condrey =

American game designer

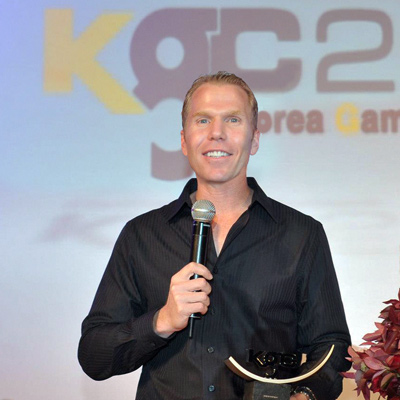
- Condrey at the October 2012 Korea Games Conference
- Occupations: Video game director; producer
- Known for: Dead Space; Call of Duty: Advanced Warfare; Call of Duty: WWII

Michael Condrey is an American video game developer best known as the co-founder and former studio head of Sledgehammer Games, which he founded with Glen Schofield after their collaboration on the popular video game franchise Dead Space. He was the president of 31st Union, a 2K studio located in Silicon Valley, California.

== Career ==
Condrey graduated in 1997 from the University of Washington. The following year, his senior thesis on applying biotechnology to conservation biology was published in the Molecular Ecology. After working as a scuba diving instructor and boat captain in the Cayman Islands, he began work on a graduate degree in Seattle. It was there that he launched his game development career, beginning with a summer job at Electronic Arts (EA) during the peak of Seattle's gaming explosion. Condrey later relocated to Redwood City at the EA-owned studio Visceral Games, where he became studio chief operations officer, as well as senior development director on the 2008 title Dead Space. He also worked on three other successful EA franchises: Need for Speed, FIFA and the James Bond game series.

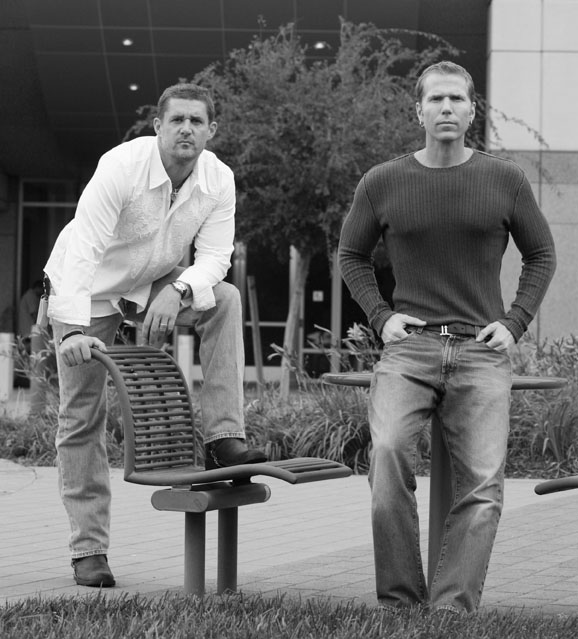
Condrey (right) and Glen Schofield at the Sledgehammer headquarter, 2009

In November 2009, Condrey and his Visceral Games colleague Glen Schofield founded Sledgehammer Games, a subsidiary of Activision operating under the company's independent studio model. Condrey likened the opportunity to work with Activision and Call of Duty to a baseball player having a call from the New York Yankees or a filmmaker hearing from Steven Spielberg After an initial attempt to create their own Call of Duty title, Condrey and Schofield collaborated with Infinity Ward on Call of Duty: Modern Warfare 3. The game grossed $1 billion in worldwide sales in its first 16 days and took the Best Shooter prize at the 2011 Spike Video Game Awards. The following year, the game was named Game Design of the Year at the Korea Games Conference and won the Global Award from Japan Game Awards 2012 at the Tokyo Game Show.

Condrey and Schofield left their roles at Sledgehammer in February 2018, taking up executive positions within Activision. Condrey subsequently left Activision in December 2018 to help establish a new, 2K Games studio under Take Two Interactive near San Francisco in January 2019. The studio name was announced in February 2020 as 31st Union, along with announcing a second location to open in Spain. In February 2025, Strauss Zelnick, Take-Two CEA, reported to Variety that Condrey had transitioned into an advisory role but remained with the company following 31st Union's community playtest of Project Ethos.

== Game credits ==
Game	Year	Publisher	Credit
Need for Speed III: Hot Pursuit	1998	Electronic Arts	Tester
FIFA 99	1998	Electronic Arts	Producer
Deer Hunt Challenge	1999	Electronic Arts	
Ultimate Hunt Challenge	2000	Electronic Arts	
Champion Bass	2000	Electronic Arts	
The World is Not Enough	2000	Electronic Arts	Producer
James Bond 007: Agent Under Fire	2001	Electronic Arts	Producer
James Bond 007: Nightfire	2002	Electronic Arts	Producer
James Bond 007: Everything or Nothing	2004	Electronic Arts	Director
From Russia with Love	2005	Electronic Arts	Director
Dead Space	2008	Electronic Arts	Director
Dead Space: Extraction	2009	Electronic Arts	Special Thanks
Call of Duty: Black Ops	2010	Activision	Special Thanks
Call of Duty: Modern Warfare 3	2011	Activision	Director
Call of Duty: Black Ops II	2012	Activision	Special Thanks
Call of Duty: Advanced Warfare	2014	Activision	Director
Call of Duty: WWII	2017	Activision	Director

== Industry perspective ==
Condrey has expressed concerns about the industry's focus on the top five blockbuster video game titles, noting that, in 2012, "there are probably 10 games that should qualify" at that tier, leaving the middle space below as a kind of game purgatory. The result, he said, has created more innovation for other platforms, genres and business models, including Apple's iOS operating system, freemium business models and social-network games. "Across the industry," Condrey said in a GamesIndustry International interview, "it's as exciting as I've ever seen it in terms of innovation and trying new things out."

Condrey has also discussed the role of microtransactions in video games. In 2019, following his departure from Activision, Condrey criticized Activision's implementation of microtranscations, saying Advanced Warfare "launched only with rewarded Supply Drops." and that the team "were driven by, and at the service of, providing fans more ways" to "express achievements", further saying "$30 for a melee weapon? Not on my watch."
