= The First World War (disambiguation) =

The First World War was a global conflict lasting from 1914 to 1918.

The First World War may also refer to:

- The First World War (TV series), a 2003 documentary series
- The First World War (wargame), a 1977 board wargame
- The First World War, a 1960 military history book by Cyril Falls

== See also ==
- WWI (disambiguation)
- World War One (disambiguation)
- The Second World War (disambiguation)
- World War III (disambiguation)
