= Call of Duty: WWII =

2017 video game

- Developer: Sledgehammer Games (Note: Additional work by Raven Software, Infinity Ward, High Moon Studios, Beenox, Toys for Bob, and Demonware)
- Publisher: Activision
- Directors: Cameron Dayton; Glen Schofield; Michael Condrey; Bret Robbins
- Producer: Jaime Wojick
- Designers: Daniel Bryner; Sean Soucy
- Programmer: Jason Bell
- Artist: Joe Salud
- Writer: Jeremy Breslau
- Composer: Wilbert Roget II
- Series: Call of Duty
- Engine: Sledgehammer Games engine
- Platforms: PlayStation 4; Windows; Xbox One
- Release: November 3, 2017
- Genre: First-person shooter
- Modes: Single-player, multiplayer

Call of Duty: WWII is a 2017 first-person shooter game developed by Sledgehammer Games and published by Activision. It was released worldwide on November 3, 2017, for PlayStation 4, Windows and Xbox One. It is the fourteenth main installment in the Call of Duty series and the first title in the series to be set primarily during World War II since Call of Duty: World at War in 2008.

The game's campaign is set in the European theatre and is centered around a squad in the 1st Infantry Division following their battles on the Western Front and set mainly in the historical events of Operation Overlord (D-Day). The player controls Ronald "Red" Daniels, who has squadmates who can supply the player with extra ammunition, health, or grenades as well as a targeted grenade and target spotting; none of these are automatically replenished in the campaign. The multiplayer mode features map locations not seen in the campaign. The mode also features the new Divisions system, replacing the create-a-class system that previous games in the series used. A social hub, named Headquarters, was also implemented into the game, allowing for players to interact with each other.

Sledgehammer Games were interested in bringing the series back to World War II after developing their previous title, Call of Duty: Advanced Warfare (2014), which featured advanced movements and futuristic warfare technology. Studio head Michael Condrey stated that he was unsure if a World War II game would feel right after creating a futuristic title like Advanced Warfare, but the developers ultimately decided to create a game in this time period. They also chose to include atrocities and Nazi concentration camps in the campaign mode to deliver an authentic war story.

Upon release, the game received generally positive reviews from critics. Praise was given towards its story, the changes to combat, multiplayer modes, and visuals. However, it was criticized for the single-player's lack of innovation and similarity to past games set in the same era. Retrospective reviews have been mixed. The game was a commercial success, generating $500 million of revenue within just three days of its release. It became the highest-grossing console game of 2017 in North America, and generated over $1 billion in worldwide revenue by the end of the year.

== Gameplay ==
Call of Duty: WWII is a first-person shooter game. Not similar to its recent predecessors, it removes the advanced system of movement present in the two previous Call of Duty titles, which included double jumping and wall running. Instead, it features a return of traditional movement to the series, taking it back to an original "boots on the ground" (which refers to non-aerial ground combat) gameplay style. The game features an unlimited sprint mechanic, seen in the previous two titles. Instead of a "slide" movement mechanic, which allowed players to slide quickly on the ground, WWII features a "hit-the-deck" mechanic that allows the player to leap forward and throw themselves on the ground in order to get to cover quickly, similarly to a previous mechanic known as "dolphin dive" in Treyarch's Call of Duty: Black Ops and Call of Duty: Black Ops II.

=== Campaign ===
WWII is the first title since the original game and Call of Duty 2: Big Red One not to feature health regeneration in the campaign. Instead, players must find health packs scattered throughout levels, or rely on their medic squadmate to provide health packs. Other members of the player's squad can provide ammunition, grenades, call in mortar strikes, or spot enemies and reveal their position in form of silhouettes. In certain sections of the game, enemy soldiers in the campaign can be captured, and wounded allies can be dragged to cover. In some parts of the campaign, players are able to control vehicles.

=== Multiplayer ===
WWII introduces Headquarters, a social space for players to interact with each other.

The multiplayer mode for Call of Duty: WWII was revealed on E3 2017, which took place from June 13–15. Sledgehammer Games announced features such as the new headquarters social space, divisions, war mode and the return to "boots-on-the-ground" gameplay. Players who pre-ordered the game were invited to a closed beta, which was released initially for the PlayStation 4, and later released on other platforms.

In online multiplayer matches, players are randomly assigned either to Allies or Axis side. With regards to playing as the latter, Glen Schofield, co-founder and co-studio head at Sledgehammer, said "We also make a distinction between the SS and the German regular army", clarifying "The big distinction that Germans still make today is that between the German military and the Nazis. We made sure we made that distinction in the game, that the Germans were doing their duty". Jörg Friedrich, one of the developers of Through the Darkest of Times, criticized this choice for promulgating the "myth of the clean Wehrmacht", a false revisionist claim that regular Wehrmacht forces, unlike the Waffen-SS, were not involved in war crimes or culpable for the Holocaust. Other critics have argued that the distinction between Wehrmacht soldiers and the Nazi party is not meaningful when the former's actions helped advance the latter's genocidal activities. They also argue that play as these factions gradually numbs the audience's reaction to and normalizes an otherwise abhorrent group.

Instead of the usual create-a-class system, WWII features Divisions. Players can choose one of five (later eight) divisions, each with their own different basic combat training, division training, and weapon skills. Players need to progress through ranks in divisions in order to use additional perks, in addition to a global perk system named Basic Training. The divisions featured in the game are: Infantry, Airborne, Armored, Mountain, and Expeditionary. Additional divisions, Resistance, Cavalry, and Commando, were added throughout 2018 as part of post-release updates. The Divisions system received an overhaul in April 2018 to address balancing issues.

WWII also features Headquarters mode, which acts as a social space in the game. The hub is set on the Omaha Beach in Normandy, three days after the invasion when Allies retake the beach and turn it into a base. 48 players can be in the Headquarters at a time, and take part in various activities. For example, players can watch other players open loot boxes while in the Headquarters. There is a firing range in the hub, where all players can practice their shooting skills with all weapons, as well as a field where they can test scorestreaks. There are also areas where players can engage in "1v1" fights, as other players watch the duels.

The end-game "killcam" highlight shown at the end of multiplayer matches has been changed to "Bronze Star", which show kills "deemed most impressive" (counted by most points gained in a row). The exception to this is the Search & Destroy game mode, which does not use Bronze Star killcam. Search & Destroy uses a final killcam, showing the last kill in the round.

A new game mode, War, is introduced as a "narrative-driven" multiplayer game mode, developed in partnership with Raven Software. In War, two teams of 6 players perform objectives as either the Allied or Axis faction, inspired by some of the iconic World War II battles, such as storming Normandy on D-Day as the Allied, or defending the Normandy bunker as the Axis in the map Operation Neptune. In addition to War, popular game modes such as Team Deathmatch, Domination and Hardpoint return, as well as Gridiron, a "boots on the ground" variation of Uplink, which was originally introduced by Sledgehammer Games in Call of Duty: Advanced Warfare. Several fan-favorite modes, as well as new modes, are introduced in time-limited events throughout the season, such as Demolition or Infected.

=== Nazi Zombies ===
WWII includes a zombies cooperative game mode, similar to previous entries by Treyarch and Infinity Ward, with its own original storyline set in alternate history and separate from the campaign. The game mode, dubbed Nazi Zombies in reference to its first iteration in Treyarch's Call of Duty: World at War, is also set in the events of World War II, as the Third Reich makes a desperate attempt to turn the tide of the war by creating an undead army in the final stages of the war. While the mode is based on science-fiction and is a fictional take on the war, Sledgehammer Games co-founder Michael Condrey said that the story of the mode is based on some "real events". He also revealed that the experience is similar to Dead Space, a third person shooter horror video game directed by both Condrey and Schofield during their work time at EA Redwood Shores.

In regards to gameplay, Nazi Zombies retains the wave-based survival formula that have been used in all previous Zombies entries, with new additions. A class system is introduced, where players can opt for one of four combat roles: Offense, Control, Medic and Support, which provide different in-game abilities. Class loadouts are also included, with equippable Raven Mods, which are perks similar to the multiplayer mode. Sledgehammer Games also attempted to rationalize some of the popular mechanics, such as weapon wallbuys and currencies, with realistic explanation that fit within the lore of the game mode. Nazi Zombies includes a hint system, where portions of the main story quest are given directional hints for players to find and progress. In regards to the story quest, Sledgehammer's creative director Cameron Dayton reveals that there is a "casual path" for new and casual players where they can progress with the story, while a "hardcore" path, which is considered the official canon, exists with hidden objectives, and expands more on the story beyond what the casual path contains.

== Plot ==
=== Campaign ===
On June 6, 1944, United States Army Private First Class Ronald "Red" Daniels (Brett Zimmerman), of the 16th Infantry Regiment of the 1st Infantry Division, assaults Omaha Beach with his platoon as part of the Normandy landings, accompanied by PFC Robert Zussman (Jonathan Tucker), Technician Fifth Grade Frank Aiello (Jeff Schine), and Private Drew Stiles (Kevin Coubal); as well as the abrasive and alcoholic Technical Sergeant William Pierson (Josh Duhamel) and First Lieutenant Joseph Turner (Jeffrey Pierce). Zussman is stabbed by a German soldier during the battle, but recovers after being dragged to safety by Daniels. On July 25 and 26, the platoon accompanies the 745th Tank Battalion as part of Operation Cobra, liberating the town of Marigny; Daniels learns that Pierson was demoted after recklessly leading his men to their deaths during the Battle of Kasserine Pass.

On August 20, the platoon is ordered by Colonel Davis (Matt Riedy) to conduct an operation with British Special Operations Executive officers Arthur Crowley (David Alpay) and Vivian Harris (Helen Sadler) to intercept and destroy a German armored train carrying V-2 rockets, rendezvousing with French resistance member Camille "Rousseau" Denis (Bella Dayne). On August 25, Rousseau and Crowley infiltrate a German garrison in Paris to retrieve explosives in preparation for the platoon's assault upon it. Rousseau places explosives on the entrance and assassinates Gestapo officer Heinrich (J. Paul Boehmer) when he discerns her true identity, allowing the platoon to liberate the city.

On October 18, the platoon assaults Aachen, supported by an M4 Sherman tank commanded by Staff Sergeant Augustine Pérez (Christian Lanz) of the 745th Tank Battalion. After liberating a hotel, they discover civilians sheltering within the basement, and Turner orders their evacuation despite Pierson's objections. After Daniels rescues a young girl named Anna (Lilith Max), German soldiers open fire on a truck carrying the civilians, killing Anna's older sister, Erica. Pierson sends the truck away without protection. On November 14, the platoon is ordered to capture Hill 493 during the Battle of Hürtgen Forest. Pierson and Zussman are tasked with advancing towards the hill, while Daniels and Turner cover them until they can meet at the bottom. However, Turner's squad discovers that Pierson ordered an early attack on the hill, forcing them to join in. The platoon destroys artillery positions, but are attacked by a Tiger II. Daniels is injured in the process of destroying the tank, and Turner sacrifices himself to cover the platoon's escape after rescuing him. In the aftermath, Pierson becomes head of the platoon, promoting Daniels to corporal.

On December 25, during the Battle of the Bulge, the platoon is surrounded by Germans. African-American combat engineer Marcus Howard (Russell Richardson) helps the platoon contact air support, then the player assumes control of Second Lieutenant Matthew Weber in his P-47 Thunderbolt of the 509th Fighter Squadron. On December 27, Daniels obtains intelligence from a German POW revealing that the Germans plan to destroy the bridge during the Battle of Remagen, the last bridge over the Rhine. After destroying the explosives in transit, the platoon attacks a nearby air base to destroy the remaining explosives. The attack fails, and Zussman is captured. Daniels disobeys Pierson and attempts to pursue the truck carrying Zussman, but is wounded and fails, with Pierson firing him from the platoon; Zussman is sent to a concentration camp. Daniels is awarded a Bronze Star for discovering the German intelligence, and given the option to return home to his pregnant wife. Daniels refuses, however, still desiring to rescue Zussman. While recovering, he learns from Davis that Pierson was actually demoted, after the Battle of Kasserine Pass, for disobeying orders to retreat in a failed attempt to save part of his platoon. Daniels confronts Pierson, who admits the truth, and allows Daniels to rejoin the platoon.

On March 7, 1945, the platoon captures the last bridge over the Rhine. They head into Germany and search of Zussman, eventually reaching the Berga concentration camp, which they find abandoned; the camp's survivors were sent on a death march. Daniels finds and saves Zussman. With the war in Europe over, Daniels leaves his platoon and returns home to Texas, reuniting with his wife and newborn son. He visits the grave of his older brother, Paul (Chris Browning), who died during Daniels’ childhood after being attacked by a wolf that Daniels failed to shoot, and places his medal on the tombstone.

=== Nazi Zombies ===
| No. | Title | Original release date |
|---|---|---|
| 1 | "Prologue" | November 3, 2017 |
Austrian engineer Marie Fischer (Katheryn Winnick) is sent on a mission to her hometown village of Mittelberg by her commanding officer, Major Hank Rideau (Darin De Paul), to retrieve lost artifacts stolen by the Nazis for experimentation, as well as rescue her brother, Klaus, who provided the information. Klaus has been unwillingly working with their lead scientist Peter Straub (Udo Kier) and weapons expert Colonel Heinz Richter (Tomm Voss) on a project to exploit a new energy dubbed "Geistkraft" (literal translation: ‘Spiritforce’) to assist the Nazi party's war efforts. Marie is accompanied by Scottish history professor turned art thief Drostan Hynd (David Tennant), Art Historian turned French Resistance fighter Olivia Durant (Élodie Yung) and United States Army Captain Jefferson Potts (Ving Rhames), all of whom have significant knowledge on the stolen arts and relics. However, on their train ride to Mittelberg, the group is attacked by an unidentified colossal being. Marie is stranded from the others, and finds herself taking temporary refuge at a small house nearby, where she holds out against hordes of dead German soldiers reanimated by Geistkraft, until she is able to make her way to the village.
| 2 | "The Final Reich" | November 3, 2017 |
After reuniting with the other three, Marie and the crew proceed further down into the village's hidden bunker, where Straub has set up his laboratory. There, they fend off against Straub's undead horde, as well as Richter, whose obsession on weaponization of Geistkraft puts him at odds with Straub. Eventually, the group recovers the artifact, the Hilt of Emperor Frederick Barbarossa's Sword. They then encounter the creature from earlier, a humanoid-shaped amalgam of numerous body parts sewn and stitched together, dubbed the Panzermörder (literal translation: 'Armor Killer'), with Klaus fused into the creature's chest. Using special magnetized batteries, the group manages to stun the Panzermörder and attach the batteries onto it. Richter's zeppelin, flying above the village, attempts to pull the batteries back, which pulls the creature along as well. The Panzermörder struggles to escape, and destroys the zeppelin and itself, freeing Klaus from its body. The Hilt's power somehow revives Klaus, but in a seemingly possessed state, he staggers into the village while ignoring Marie's pleas. He tells the crew to prevent "the Emperor"'s return, before activating a fire trap, disappearing in the engulfing flame.
| 3 | "The Darkest Shore" | January 30, 2018 |
Days later, the crew receives intel of Straub's sighting at the islands of Heligoland, where he has been storing his undead army. They travel to the island in pursuit of Straub, as well as the next piece of Barbarossa's Sword. The crew comes into struggle with the Nazi Kriegsmarine forces protecting the island as well as Straub's latest undead creations, as he prepares for an assault on Britain. Upon solving several ancient riddles, they find a ritual chamber dedicated to the goddess Nerthus, where they acquire the Pommel of Barbarossa's Sword. The crew then calls the British Royal Air Force in for an airstrike to destroy the facility on the island; in an effort to escape, they go up against the Meistermeuchlers (literal translation: Master Assassins), zombies that are engineered to adapt to their enemies' combat style and skills. After defeating the monstrous creatures, they manage to stow away on one of Straub's zeppelins, as he and his forces return to Berlin in response to Adolf Hitler's call for rescue.
| 4 | "The Shadowed Throne" | April 10, 2018 |
The zeppelins arrive at Berlin as the Red Army begins their invasion into the city. Realizing that the Russians will be outmatched by the undead army, the crew grabs onto one of the zombie drop pods and lands onto the ground. After assisting the Red Army by drawing Straub's attention away from them, the four recover three Geistkraft-powered melee weapons hidden around the city by the Nazis. Using the weapons as keys, they uncover a hidden courtyard, where they find the final piece of Barbarossa's Sword, the Blade. With all parts of the Sword collected, the crew infiltrates Straub's zeppelin for a final showdown, where he ends up being overwhelmed and brutally killed by his own zombies. They battle against Straub's last creation, the Stadtjäger (literal translation: 'City Hunter'), then make it back to the city where they hold out against the endless zombie horde until Rideau arrives and extracts them.
| 5 | "The Tortured Path" | June 26, 2018 |
In the wake of Straub's demise, the undead army is unleashed all across Europe. United States President Harry S. Truman authorizes Rideau, now General, to form the Bureau of Archaic Technologies, a special task force consisting of global elite Allied agents, in order to combat the new threat. Unable to reassemble the Sword of Barbarossa on their own, Marie and Drostan deduce that their only option is to find the legendary forge of Thule. Jefferson, now promoted to Major, leads the team to New Swabia, Antarctica, in search of the forge upon discovery of increased Nazi activity in the region. Rideau leads a team of new Bureau recruits to transport the pieces of the Sword by different routes to New Swabia. The B.A.T. operatives head to a port at Málaga, Spain, and board a ship across the Atlantic Ocean. Along the way, they encounter resistance from the undead army, but manage to prevail. At New Swabia, the crew find the forge, and upon successful deciphering of ancient Thulian runes, they finally reassemble the Sword after Rideau delivers the remaining pieces. Afterwards, the crew battles against the Guardian of the forge, and emerges victorious. The four manage to escape the forge as it collapses, but unbeknownst to them, Geistkraft energy begins to flow intensively beneath the area.
| 6 | "The Frozen Dawn" | August 28, 2018 |
On their flight back from New Swabia, the crew's plane is shot by a bolt of Geistkraft lightning, and crash-lands near the site. They then find themselves within the Lost City of Thule, the source of the Geistkraft energy. The team uncovers ancient weapons once wielded by the Raven Lords, elite warriors who are meant to bring balance to a cycle of life and death, and uses them against the undead horde. B.A.T. agent Vivian Harris, who is sent by Rideau to recover Barbarossa's Sword from the crash, is driven insane by its power, and uses it to awaken the God King, a gigantic Thulian entity who claims to be the influence behind Straub as well as Barbarossa. The God King seemingly overpowers the four, but Klaus, who has been reborn as the Rook, arrives and charges them with Geistkraft, bestowing them the title of Raven Lords, allowing them to defeat the God King. Rideau then contacts the four, revealing his true status as a member of the Order of the Ravens, an ancient cult dedicated to serving the Raven Lords; he insists that they must now embrace their newfound titles and destiny, and lead the Order in the ongoing battle against the remaining undead forces.

== Development ==
Call of Duty: World War II is the second game in the Call of Duty franchise developed by Sledgehammer Games, and the fourth to benefit under publisher Activision's three-year development cycle (the first being Sledgehammer's Call of Duty: Advanced Warfare) in order for a longer development time for each game. A new Call of Duty title set in World War II was alluded to in a 2014 Call of Duty: Advanced Warfare launch interview with Michael Condrey, co-founder of Sledgehammer Games. In the interview by Metro, the interviewer asked him what the possibilities of where the next Call of Duty could go in terms of setting. Condrey responded, "Some of my favorite pieces of entertainment are set in World War II." Band of Brothers, I'm a massive fan of Band of Brothers." Condrey dived further into the subject, "And that's a great hero's war, kind of the last that was recognized as a noble cause in a war. So yeah, I think a next generation game with the latest production values and robustness in a World War II setting like Band of Brothers would be amazing. Now, how would it play and how would the multiplayer work after the new movement set in Advanced Warfare? That's a tougher question than I've had to tackle yet…". The game runs on an upgraded version of Sledgehammer Games' in-house custom engine from Call of Duty: Advanced Warfare.

Sledgehammer Games was hesitant to reveal all the authentic settings from World War II that developers have put into the game's storyline. Activision initially refused to deny claims that Nazi extermination camps would be featured in the game. Adam Rosenberg of Mashable wrote that video games set during World War II tended to be "Holocaust deniers" in the sense that they avoided broaching the subject for business reasons, but that this could be the very first Call of Duty World War II based game where the Holocaust would be depicted. Senior creative director Bret Robbins said in an interview "Some very, very dark things happened during this conflict and it felt wrong for us to ignore that." He further stated "We absolutely show atrocities. It's an unfortunate part of the history, but you can't tell an authentic, truthful story without going there. So we went there." Robbins argued that audiences can now handle games with more maturity and nuance, "People are ready for it. They want it", he said. When asked directly over Twitter as to whether or not the story campaign would allow gamers the opportunity to play as soldiers from the Axis powers such as Nazi Germany and Fascist Italy, Sledgehammer Games confirmed that the campaign gameplay would be limited to Allied forces. More specifically, Sledgehammer co-founder Michael Condrey confirmed that the game will focus exclusively on the Allied powers.

The Windows version of the game was developed in a collaboration with Raven Software. In regards to it, Raven's CTO Dwight Luetscher stated that they were trying to focus on the Windows platform, as well as the community, by responding to their needs for it to excel. The Windows version features several notable changes, including removal of controller aim assist and addition of sensitivity slider for aim-down-sights mechanic.

All pre-orders excluding the PC version included access to the private beta, which was made available first on the PlayStation 4 from August 25–28, followed by a second week for both PlayStation 4 and Xbox One from September 1–4. The PC beta was announced as an open beta, and ran from September 29 – October 2 on Steam. Players who participated in the beta received the Beta Combat Pack for the full game, which contains a special in-game helmet, emblem and calling card. The game is available in three editions: Base Edition, Digital Deluxe Edition and the Pro Edition. The Pro Edition was sold exclusively at GameStop, with pre-orders of the game at GameStop also included a limited edition hat.

== Release ==
The game was released worldwide on November 3, 2017, for PlayStation 4, Windows and Xbox One.

=== Downloadable content ===
Call of Duty: WWII offers four downloadable content map packs, each containing three regular multiplayer maps, one War map, and one Nazi Zombies map. Players who purchased the Season Pass, which granted access to all four map packs on release, also received "Carentan", a remake of the multiplayer map of the same name featured in Call of Duty and Call of Duty 2.

On December 19, 2017, Activision released a preview trailer for the first downloadable content pack, The Resistance, containing three new multiplayer maps: "Anthropoid", "Valkyrie", "Occupation" (the latter of which is a remake of "Resistance" from Call of Duty: Modern Warfare 3); one new War map: "Operation Intercept"; and one new Nazi Zombies map: "The Darkest Shore". The map pack was released January 30, 2018, first on PlayStation 4, and on March 1 for Xbox One and Steam.

On April 6, 2018, Activision announced the second downloadable content pack, The War Machine, containing 3 multiplayer maps: "Egypt", "Dunkirk", and "V2"; 1 new War map:" Operation Husky"; and 1 new Nazi Zombies map: "The Shadowed Throne". The map pack was released on April 17, 2018, first on PlayStation 4, and on May 17 for Xbox One and Steam.

On June 19, 2018, Activision announced the third downloadable content pack, United Front, containing three multiplayer maps: "Monte Cassino", "Market Garden", and "Stalingrad"; one new War map: "Operation Supercharge"; and three new Nazi Zombies maps: "Into the Storm", "Across the Depth", and "Beneath the Ice", referred to collectively as "The Tortured Path". The map pack was released on June 26, 2018, first on PlayStation 4, and on July 26 for Xbox One and Steam.

On August 23, 2018, Activision announced the fourth and final downloadable content pack, Shadow War, containing three multiplayer maps: "Airship", "Chancellery", and "Excavation"; one new War map: "Operation Arcane"; and one new Nazi Zombies map: "The Frozen Dawn". The map pack was released on August 28, 2018, first on PlayStation 4, and on September 27 for Xbox One and Steam.

In addition to the map packs, the game also received several free multiplayer maps as part of seasonal events. On December 7, 2017, Sledgehammer released "Winter Carentan", a winter-themed version of the "Carentan" map, to all players as part of the Winter Siege event. On March 13, 2018, "Shipment 1944", a remake of the map "Shipment" from Call of Duty 4: Modern Warfare was released to all season pass holders, and to all players three days after. On April 17, Sledgehammer Games introduced a new map, HQ, based on the same Headquarters social hub, as a playable map in several party modes. On May 29, the Nazi Zombies map "Gröesten Haus" was brought into multiplayer as a playable map for zombie-themed game modes as part of the Attack of the Undead event. On July 30, a new map, "Sandbox", was added for free to all PlayStation 4 players as part of the Days of Summer event, and on August 30 for Xbox One and Steam players.

== Reception ==
=== Pre-release ===
Before the game's release, its sparse use of the Swastika symbol, as well as the diversity of playable German soldiers in the online multiplayer, drew some criticism. During E3 2017, Sledgehammer co-founder Michael Condrey explained that swastikas were removed from the multiplayer and Zombies modes as "Including Nazi symbols wouldn't bring honor, nor be appropriate, without the rich history of a WW2 story to ground their context in Multiplayer" and that the multiplayer experiences were "shared, global ones, so we needed to adhere to local laws and regulations", referring to Germany's censorship laws on the imagery of swastikas. On the other hand, swastikas would be included in the campaign, stemming from wanting to be "historically accurate and tell the story we wanted to tell ... the best way to represent history, which was very important to us." Condrey also empathized with complaints that including black and female German soldiers in the multiplayer was historically inaccurate (as in reality Nazi Germany never recruited people from such denominations), saying he wanted the game to appeal to a diverse audience and being reflected in their player avatar: "it's also about putting you - this is about you - in World War 2 ... that evolution of your character means it's important for us to allow you to choose to be you, and to have a hero that represents who you are, whomever you choose that to be."

=== Post-release ===
Reception

Aggregate score
| Aggregator | Score |
|---|---|
| Metacritic | XONE: 80/100; PS4: 79/100; PC: 73/100 |

Review scores
| Publication | Score |
|---|---|
| Destructoid | 7/10 |
| Edge | 7/10 |
| Electronic Gaming Monthly | 8.5/10 |
| Game Informer | 8.75/10 |
| GameRevolution | 3.5/5 |
| GameSpot | 9/10 |
| GamesRadar+ | 4/5 |
| Giant Bomb | 3/5 |
| IGN | 8/10 |
| PC Gamer (US) | 70/100 |
| Polygon | 7/10 |

Call of Duty: WWII received "generally favorable" reviews from critics for the PlayStation 4 and Xbox One, while the PC version received "mixed or average" reviews, according to review aggregator website Metacritic.

Miguel Concepcion of GameSpot awarded the game a 9/10, writing that the campaign was "moving" and "salutes the brotherhood that grows and strengthens on the battlefield" with "a supporting cast of well-crafted personalities", as well as praising the game's "excellent visuals and sound design". In his 8.5/10 review for EGMNow, Nick Plessas similarly wrote that the campaign's protagonists were "well characterized and [...] the cause for the game's most impactful conflicts". He praised the lack of regenerating health which gave the game "new levels of strategy and exploration, ultimately adding more entertainment than frustration", and that the reliance on fellow soldiers "necessitates more strategic positioning and resource management".

IGN's Miranda Sanchez awarded the game 8/10, saying the campaign was a "more human perspective than we've seen in recent years", with interesting and diverse characters. However, she criticized some action sequences for conflicting with the game's serious tone, as well as several repetitive and frustrating missions. She wrote that the Zombies was the standout mode in the game, which helped strike "a rewarding balance for the diehard zombies fans [...] and those that just want to jump in and have a good time", although criticized that the experience suffered when playing with other people. Daniel Tack from Game Informer gave the game an 8.75/10, stating that he felt the campaign was the only drawback overall; despite capturing a "signature explosive feel through various adrenaline-fueled moments", he thought progression felt tedious as a result of "standard gunplay and endless killing fields". He praised the multiplayer as the "shining star of the three modes", especially enjoying the game's new War mode in terms of its variety, and highlighted the return to the traditional gameplay and range of customization options.

GameRevolution's Jason Faulkner complained that storming German emplacements from the sea was already in Medal of Honor: Frontline, Call of Duty 2 and Battlefield 1942 and similar mission in Call of Duty: WWII had "a very “been there done that” feel". However, he notes that some missions in the game "stand out among the best in the series". Also, he agrees that "The production quality is excellent".

Destructoid's Chris Moyse praised the game as a "satisfying experience" and the campaign as "one of the series' best in some time", but felt that "it also makes little effort to overhaul the brand as a whole, playing it incredibly safe when the opportunity for reinvention was right there for the taking." Polygon's Russ Frushtick generally praised the multiplayer, calling it "strong and enjoyable", but criticized the campaign, writing that "just about every mission feels like déjà vu, as if I'd played it before in another game" and that "Changing the time period so dramatically only helps to highlight how little has changed since the franchise's total re-imagining with Call of Duty 4." Jeff Gerstmann of Giant Bomb was more critical of the game, calling the characters "lifeless and generic" and the antagonists "faceless Nazis", stating that "the game doesn't really feel like it's doing anything cool to take advantage of its setting and time period" and summarising "despite all of Activision's big talk about "boots on the ground" action and how this was going to be some big deal, the setting change didn't bring any new and exciting inspiration with it. This feels like the most wheel-spinning, by-the-numbers Call of Duty they've made thus far."

Eurogamer ranked the game 38th on their list of the "Top 50 Games of 2017", while EGMNow ranked it 20th in their list of the 25 Best Games of 2017. The game was nominated for "Best Shooter", "Best Graphics", "Best Multiplayer" and "Best Spectator Game" in IGN's Best of 2017 Awards.

=== Retrospective reviews ===
Retrospective assessments of Call of Duty: WWII have been mixed. Some publications rank it among the series' top 10 best games, whereas others do not. The series' return to its World War II roots was generally well received after its more futuristic predecessors, with Digital Trends saying that "it felt like Call of Duty 2 has been remade for the next generation of players". The single-player campaign received positive mentions for its Band of Brothers-like narrative, emotional moments, and set pieces, although the NME felt it was "enjoyable yet forgettable upon completion". The multiplayer was praised for returning to boots-on-the-ground gameplay, although the mode's progression and Divisions systems, and Headquarters social hub received mixed opinions. NME said that, despite its WWII setting, the gameplay still "feels slick and modern, with red dots and lasers strapped to 1940s weaponry". Discussing the Zombies mode, Digital Trends believed the mode felt "out of place in an otherwise serious game".

Comparing WWII to other games in the series, ComicBook.com found it to be a "servicable" entry that lacked innovation. More negatively, Complex ranked the game among the series' worst titles, citing problems such as a poor launch, weapon imbalancing, and poorly designed maps. TheGamer also ranked it poorly, saying "It was just far too ambitious for its own good, ultimately making it suffer in the end."

=== Sales ===
The game earned over US$500 million within its first three days of release. On December 20, 2017, it was announced that the game had generated over $1 billion in worldwide revenue, and was the highest-grossing console game of the year in North America and second highest in the United Kingdom. By the end of 2017, the game had over 20.7 million players, 12.1 million players on PlayStation 4, 7.8 million players on Xbox One, and 825,000 players on Steam.

The PlayStation 4 version sold 168,234 copies within its first week on sale in Japan, making it the best-selling game of that week in the country.

=== Accolades ===
| Year | Award | Category | Result | Ref. |
|---|---|---|---|---|
| 2017 | Game Critics Awards | Best Action Game | Nominated | |
| 2017 | Game Critics Awards | Best Online Multiplayer | Nominated | |
| 2017 | Golden Joystick Awards | Most Wanted Game | Nominated | |
| 2017 | The Game Awards 2017 | Best Multiplayer | Nominated | |
| 2017 | Titanium Awards | Best Action Game | Nominated | |
| 2018 | Guild of Music Supervisors Awards | Best Music Supervision in a Video Game | Nominated | |
| 2018 | 16th Visual Effects Society Awards | Outstanding Visual Effects in a Real-Time Project | Nominated | |
| 2018 | 21st Annual D.I.C.E. Awards | Action Game of the Year | Nominated | |
| 2018 | 21st Annual D.I.C.E. Awards | Outstanding Achievement in Online Gameplay | Nominated | |
| 2018 | 21st Annual D.I.C.E. Awards | Outstanding Achievement in Original Music Composition | Nominated | |
| 2018 | National Academy of Video Game Trade Reviewers Awards | Camera Direction in a Game Engine | Nominated | |
| 2018 | Italian Video Game Awards | People's Choice | Nominated | |
| 2018 | SXSW Gaming Awards | Excellence in SFX | Nominated | |
| 2018 | SXSW Gaming Awards | eSports Game of the Year | Nominated | |
| 2018 | 16th Annual Game Audio Network Guild Awards | Music of the Year | Won | |
| 2018 | 16th Annual Game Audio Network Guild Awards | Sound Design of the Year | Won | |
| 2018 | 16th Annual Game Audio Network Guild Awards | Best Original Soundtrack Album | Won | |
| 2018 | 16th Annual Game Audio Network Guild Awards | Best Interactive Score | Won | |
| 2018 | 16th Annual Game Audio Network Guild Awards | Best Cinematic/Cutscene Audio | Nominated | |
| 2018 | 16th Annual Game Audio Network Guild Awards | Best Original Instrumental ("A Brotherhood of Heroes") | Won | |
| 2018 | 16th Annual Game Audio Network Guild Awards | Best Game Audio Article, Publication or Broadcast | Won | |
| 2018 | 14th British Academy Games Awards | Audio Achievement | Nominated | |
| 2018 | ASCAP Composers' Choice Awards | 2017 ASCAP Video Game Score of the Year | Nominated | |
| 2018 | BBC Radio 1's Teen Awards | Best Game | Nominated | |
| 2018 | Golden Joystick Awards | Best Competitive Game | Nominated | |
| 2018 | Golden Joystick Awards | eSports Game of the Year | Nominated | |

=== Swatting incident ===
Not long after WWII was released, a fatal incident occurred in which Ohio resident Casey Viner, angered over friendly fire that ruined an online match in a tournament that cost $1.50 in betting, threatened to swat his teammate, Wichita resident Shane Gaskill. Gaskill posted his previous home address in McCormick and challenged Viner to swat him. Viner contacted Los Angeles resident Tyler Barriss, who called the Wichita Police Department (WPD) claiming to have murdered his father and taken his mother and sibling hostage. He provided them with the McCormick address used by Gaskill. WPD officers arrived at the address, now occupied by 28-year-old Andrew Finch. A single officer, Justin Rapp, shot and killed Finch, claiming he believed Finch reached for his waistband.
