= World War III (disambiguation) =

World War III is a hypothetical successor to World War II (1939–1945).

World War III, World War Three, World War 3, or the Third World War may also refer to:

== Literature ==
- World War III (Left Behind), a rider in the Left Behind series of novels
- The Third World War (novel), a 2003 novel by Humphrey Hawksley
- The Third World War (Hackett novels), 1978 and 1982 novels by General Sir John Hackett

=== Comics ===
- World War 3 Illustrated, a political comics anthology founded in 1979
- Third World War (comics), a political comic strip appearing in Crisis beginning in 1988
- World War III (DC Comics), the title of two sagas published in superhero comic books by DC Comics beginning in 2000
- World War III (G.I. Joe), a comic book storyline published by Devil's Due Publishing beginning in 2007

== Games ==
- World War 3: 1976-1984, a 1975 board wargame that simulates a hypothetical war for world domination
- The Third World War (video game), for the Sega Mega-CD console
- World War III: Black Gold, a 2001 Microsoft Windows computer game
- World War 3 (video game), a 2022 game by The Farm 51

== Film and television ==
- World War III (1998 film), a 1998 German film by Robert Stone
- World War III (2022 film), a 2022 Iranian film
- WW3, a 2001 TV-movie starring Timothy Hutton and Vanessa L. Williams
- World War III (miniseries), a 1982 American TV miniseries directed by David Greene
- "World War Three" (Doctor Who), a 2005 episode of the BBC science fiction television series Doctor Who
- WCW World War 3, an annual professional wrestling pay-per-view event
  - World War 3 (1995)
  - World War 3 (1996)
  - World War 3 (1997)
  - World War 3 (1998)
- "World War III", a 1985 episode of the TV sitcom Night Court

== Music ==
=== Bands ===
- Third World War (band), an English proto-punk band formed in 1970

=== Albums ===
- World War III (Mac album), 1999
- World War III (Madina Lake album), 2011
- WWIII (album), a 2003 album by KMFDM
- In a Perfect World (album), an unreleased 2025 album by Kanye West whose working title was WW3
- WW III, a 2018 album by Wheeler Walker, Jr.

=== Songs ===
- "World War III", a 1982 song by Anti-Nowhere League from We Are...The League
- "World War III", a 1981 song by Bad Religion from Bad Religion
- "World War III", a 1982 song by Exciter
- "World War III", a 1984 song by Grandmaster Flash and the Furious Five from Grandmaster Flash and the Furious Five
- "World War III", a 2009 song by the Jonas Brothers from Lines, Vines and Trying Times
- "World War III", a 1979 song by The Suburbs
- "World War Three", a 1979 song by D.O.A.
- "WW III" (song), a 2000 song by Ruff Ryders
- "WWIII", a 2020 song by Grandson from Death of an Optimist
- "WWIII", a 2020 song by Machine Gun Kelly from Tickets to My Downfall
- "WW3", a 2017 song by Paloma Faith from The Architect
- "3rd World War", a 2013 song by Jesse Jagz from the soundtrack of the film Heaven's Hell
- "WW3" (song), a 2025 song by Kanye West

== See also ==
- World War II (disambiguation)
- WWI (disambiguation)
