= Ace Combat 8: Wings of Theve =

- Cover art featuring protagonist Rex and the F/A-18E
- Developer: Bandai Namco Aces
- Publisher: Bandai Namco Entertainment
- Directors: Kazutoki Kono; Kosuke Itomi; Natsuki Isaki; Masashi Koyonagi
- Producer: Manabu Shimomoto
- Artists: Masato Kanno; Keiichi Yamaguchi
- Writer: Sunao Katabuchi
- Composers: Keiki Kobayashi; Ryo Watanabe; Mitsuhiro Kitadani
- Series: Ace Combat
- Engine: Unreal Engine 5
- Platforms: PlayStation 5; Windows; Xbox Series X/S
- Release: October 2, 2026
- Genre: Air combat simulation
- Modes: Single-player, multiplayer

Ace Combat 8: Wings of Theve is a 2026 combat flight simulation game developed by Bandai Namco Aces and published by Bandai Namco Entertainment for Windows, PlayStation 5, and Xbox Series X/S. It is the ninth mainline installment in the Ace Combat series and is a sequel to Ace Combat 7: Skies Unknown (2019). Set in the series' fictional universe of Strangereal in 2029, amidst a war between the Federation of Central Usea and Republic of Sotoa, the game's story follows "Rex", a Usean fighter pilot who is tasked with taking on the mantle of the "Wings of Theve", a legendary flying ace whose exploits were made up for propaganda. The plot's premise is loosely inspired by real-world "ace pilot" propaganda myths such as the Ghost of Kyiv and Colonel Tomb, and involves themes of information warfare and disinformation, corporate influence in geopolitics, and hope when facing insurmountable odds.

Development of a new Ace Combat game was announced in 2021. Ace Combat 8 was officially revealed at The Game Awards 2025. Gameplay incorporates and improves upon various aspects from previous Ace Combat titles, with a greater focus on the player's squadron and a more interactive and cinematic story presentation. An online multiplayer component, Ace Combat Online, is included with the game and is separate from the single-player campaign.

Ace Combat 8 was released on October 2, 2026, to positive reception from critics, who praised its gameplay, presentation, visuals, sound design, music, theming, and sense of immersion, though the game's story and handling of cutscenes proved polarizing, as did some aspects of Ace Combat Online. The game surpassed 1 million copies sold within roughly a week of its release, becoming the fastest-selling title in the Ace Combat series.

== Gameplay ==
A screenshot of gameplay in the online mode

As with its predecessors, Ace Combat 8 is a combat flight simulation game in which the player pilots military aircraft to complete various objectives, ranging from dogfighting hostile aircraft and conducting airstrikes to battling massive high-tech superweapons and providing close air support for surface operations. The game, and its wider series, forgoes a realistic flight model in favor of more action-centric and accessible gameplay, with two control settings to accommodate different playstyles: "Novice" for simplified arcadey controls, and "Expert" for semi-realistic controls that allow for more challenging but precise maneuvers. Overall gameplay is similar to preceding Ace Combat games, with Ace Combat 8 further developing upon established series trends.

During the single-player campaign, players are given a briefing prior to each mission, where they are informed of the situation, their objectives, the expected opposition, and environmental and terrain considerations, using a 3D map representing the area of operations. Players complete missions by destroying enemy targets and satisfying mission requirements such as destroying a priority target, protecting friendly units, or inflicting sufficient destruction. Players can also complete optional aerial refueling or landing minigames before or after certain missions. Like most Ace Combat games, the story is largely progressed through briefings, debriefings, radio communications during missions, and cutscenes between missions. Ace Combat 8 features fully-rendered in-game cutscenes that are mostly depicted from the first-person perspective of the player character, during which players can look around at the ongoing scene and perform certain actions when prompted, almost 15 years since Ace Combat: Assault Horizon used similar cutscene mechanics in a much more limited capacity. The player's combat performance, along with minor narrative decisions, affects the survival of some non-player characters and their roles in specific story beats, though the overarching plot remains largely unchanged.

At launch, the game features over 30 real and fictional aircraft for players to use, divided into four categories—fighter, attacker, multirole, and electronic warfare—each with their own specializations and vulnerabilities. Players can select aircraft for themselves and their wingmen before each sortie, but certain missions restrict the selection to carrier-based aircraft, and each mission has a recommended "air-to-air" and "air-to-ground" capability that the player is suggested to satisfy with appropriate selections, such as using attackers on a ground strike mission or equipping proper ordnance to defeat known targets and threats. Alongside standard guns and missiles, each aircraft has a selection of situational special weapons to suit their role, including a variety of air-to-air missiles, air-to-ground weaponry, anti-ship missiles, and electronic countermeasure and support pods, among others; two special weapons can now be equipped instead of just one, though doing so will reduce the payload capacity of both. Aircraft have countermeasures (flares and chaff simultaneously), which can be deployed to deter missiles that a player cannot outmaneuver or evade, but have limited uses. Aircraft can also be upgraded with "parts" to improve their performance, combat effectiveness, and survivability. Aircraft, special weapons, and parts can be unlocked in a tech tree using "Military Result Points" (MRP), which are earned by completing missions.

Several gameplay elements from previous entries return in Ace Combat 8, such as "Wingman Command" (the ability to order squadron wingmen to attack enemies, provide cover, or use special weapons) from Ace Combat 5: The Unsung War and Ace Combat Zero: The Belkan War, "Frontline Resupply" (some missions allowing the player to resupply at friendly air bases) from Ace Combat 6: Fires of Liberation, a scene-limited rendition of "Dogfight Mode" (a focused close-range perspective for greater accuracy) from Assault Horizon, and revamped cloud mechanics from Ace Combat 7. Added to the combat mechanics are "chain reactions", through which collateral damage can be inflicted onto multiple targets, such as a large aircraft colliding into other enemy units beneath it after being shot down, or a fuel storage tank destroying structures and ground units in its vicinity after exploding. Additionally, larger enemies can now be damaged from anywhere as opposed to requiring hits on weak spots, and scripted sequences no longer prevent certain enemies from taking damage in order to deliver exposition or play out a scene.

=== Multiplayer ===
Ace Combat 8's multiplayer component, Ace Combat Online, is touted as the franchise's "largest online mode", and incorporates elements from Ace Combat Infinity. It is separate from the single-player campaign and features a unique progression system, in-game currency, and a battle pass. Players control their avatar, a mercenary pilot hired by the private military company Infinite Industries Incorporated, in player versus player battles, player versus environment missions, or a combination of both, with the team that has the highest score winning. There are also occasional co-op events: "Scramble", where players must duel difficult enemy aces; and "Emergency Sortie", where players must destroy a superweapon from a previous Ace Combat game.

== Synopsis ==
=== Setting ===
Ace Combat 8: Wings of Theve is set in the series' fictional universe of Strangereal, where Earth has entirely different nations, geography, and history. The game's story details the 2029 Sotoa-Usea War, fought in the continent of Usea between the Republic of Sotoa and the Federation of Central Usea (FCU) ten years after the Lighthouse War. Facing countrywide desertification that threatens the native Sotoans' nomadic way of life, Sotoa aims to settle in Usea and launches a blitzkrieg invasion of the FCU. Sotoa's use of Tonitrus Spear kinetic bombardment orbital weapon satellites, railgun-equipped Land Battleships, and exploitation of Usean separatist movements leads to the FCU losing most of their territory and geopolitical recognition, as well as their capital, Theve. Alleged sightings of a lone FCU pilot defending Theve's evacuation create the "Wings of Theve" legend, which the FCU capitalizes on to boost morale.

The game's silent protagonist, "Rex", is a member of Joker Flight on the aircraft carrier FCU Endurance, led by Commander Jan "Rex" Cope, alongside Lieutenant Commander Ellington "Professor" Baxter, Lieutenant William "Noise" Coster, and Ensign Anastasia "Tasha" Severskaya, a civilian aerobatics pilot from Yuktobania. Their allies aboard the Endurance include the ship's Executive Officer Jessica Pike; Lieutenant Commander Katherine "Little Bee" Evans, leader of Queen Flight; AWACS Dealer, Joker and Queen Flight's navigation and radio officer; Major David Jenkins, an FCU Air Force mechanic and Rex's friend; and Lucas Díez "D.D." Doniphan, a liaison from the decentralized megacorporation Enso Order who serves as the squadron's social media manager.

Other major characters include Major General Carmille "Selene" Tewy, a legendary ace pilot and Commander of the elite Sotoan Air Force squadron Lux Lunae; Colonel Girish "Ares" Toprak, a Sotoan ace pilot in Lux Lunae as Shadow 22, leader of its decorated 22nd Unit; and Rosie Falcinelli, former Princess of Erusea who is now the Chairwoman of the Selatapura Autonomous Zone, a haven for stateless refugees at the base of the International Space Elevator (ISEV).

=== Plot ===
In October 2029, three months into the war, the protagonist is rescued by the Endurance after being shot down and assigned as Cope's backseat navigator. During their first flight, Cope admits he has never shot down a Sotoan aircraft and that D.D. fabricated his reputation to maintain morale. Their aircraft is then shot down by Toprak, killing Cope, while the protagonist recovers Cope's dog tag. After being rescued again, the protagonist is urged by D.D. to assume Cope's identity of "Rex" and lead Joker Flight. Rex subsequently begins hearing Cope's voice.

Joker Flight, alongside Queen Flight, rallies the remaining FCU forces to retake Theve and disable a Land Battleship. D.D. continues to promote the "Wings of Theve" using fabricated propaganda, but his deception is exposed by a broadcast from a rogue FCU unit. During a reconnaissance mission, Rex and Baxter are forced to eject over Sotoan-occupied Rio Bajo. A local resistance member shelters them, and they briefly encounter Tewy and Toprak before the Sotoans destroy Rio Bajo with a Tonitrus Spear. The pilots escape with help from surviving freedom fighters before Tasha and Coster rescue them. Back aboard the Endurance, the broadcast reveals Cope was Sotoan-born, explaining his refusal to shoot down Sotoan aircraft; D.D. admits he knew Cope's past but convinces the others to maintain the "Wings of Theve" narrative.

Joker and Queen Flights attack Comona Space Base to stop the Tonitrus Spear from being reloaded, but Queen Flight is decimated by a Lux Lunae ambush. Comona proves to be a diversion for a second Land Battleship to assail the ISEV in an attempt to deploy a network of Tonitrus Spears. D.D. also discovers that Enso Order has been leaking intel from the Endurance to the Sotoans using a mole, who Pike shoots and kills. With help from Rosie and volunteers from Shilage, Joker Flight destroys the Land Battleship, although a second Spear is launched and the ISEV is severely damaged. D.D. is fired from Enso for siding with the Endurance, and he reveals that Enso is engineering an escalation of the war by drawing in Osea and Yuktobania, the two rivaling superpowers, so Enso can mediate a ceasefire that would rebuild Usea as a borderless Enso-dominated corporatocracy.

Baxter and D.D. launch into space to disable the Tonitrus Spears, while Joker Flight, now joined by Kate, destroys a large command aircraft that controls them, allowing an FCU counteroffensive to push Sotoan forces off Usea. During the counteroffensive, one of the Spears reactivates, inflicting severe casualties, while Kate is shot down and presumed dead. As FCU forces corner the Sotoan military, Tewy appears in a prototype neurally-linked aircraft and launches a devastating attack, fatally wounding Baxter as he protects Rex from a railgun shot.

After Joker Flight destroys Megafloat Fatsia, Sotoa's main command center, the remnants of the entire Sotoan Air Force, led by Tewy and Toprak, launch an all-out swarm attack against Joker Flight. Initially outgunned, Joker Flight is reinforced by various allies they previously encountered, including Kate, who survived being shot down. Rallied by Joker Flight's real exploits as the "Wings of Theve", the alliance defeats Sotoa's forces, including Toprak and the remaining Lux Lunae, while Tewy escapes to Theve.

As the war nears its end, Enso uses the Tonitrus Spears to destroy its own facilities to conceal its involvement. Determined to expose Enso for manipulating her country into war, Tewy attempts to redirect a Spear toward the nuclear reactor of the disabled Land Battleship, which would cause a radiological disaster Enso cannot cover up, at the cost of Theve. Through Cope, Rex learns that Cope and Tewy had a personal relationship before he left Sotoa; lamenting how violence changed her, Cope urges Rex to shoot Tewy down. Rex and Joker Flight destroy her aircraft before she can redirect the Spear, killing her.

Realizing that D.D. still possesses evidence of Enso's involvement in the war, Enso hijacks a prototype unmanned submarine to kill him and destroy the Endurance. Using a backdoor password Tewy gave Rex in her final moments, D.D. redirects the last Spear toward the submarine and livestreams its attack, exposing Enso's conspiracy to the world. People worldwide rally behind the "Wings of Theve" as Rex and Joker Flight destroy the submarine, saving the Endurance. The FCU and Sotoa declare a ceasefire, ending the war, while Enso Order is dissolved, with its assets being acquired by General Resource.

Later, during a postwar patrol with Kate over Sotoa, Rex has one final vision of Cope, who assures him that he and Tewy are at peace and bids farewell. Rex and Kate fly home, leaving Cope's dog tag beside Sotoa's native anemone flowers.

== Development ==
The FCU Endurance, the fictional aircraft carrier serving as the protagonists' "home" in Ace Combat 8, was closely modeled after the USS Hornet (CV-12).

In August 2021, Ace Combat series producer Kazutoki Kono announced that Bandai Namco Entertainment and ILCA, one of the co-developers of Ace Combat 7: Skies Unknown, had commenced the development of a new Ace Combat game. In 2022, a new studio named Bandai Namco Aces was formed with the sole objective of working on the next Ace Combat games, with Bandai Namco owning 51% of the new studio and ILCA owning the remaining 49%. After Ace Combat 7 introduced the franchise to a new audience, the team intended for Ace Combat 8 to be accessible, with a comprehensive tutorial and various training modes to allow new players to learn Ace Combat's game mechanics and systems. With Ace Combat 8 marking the 30th anniversary of the franchise, it was also planned to incorporate elements from previous Ace Combat games.

The game's development focused on three pillars: photorealistic sky rendering, aerial combat gameplay, and a heroic narrative theme. Introduced during development was "Cloudly", a new proprietary rendering technology used to create realistic clouds and reactive weather environments, allowing players to track visual signals such as contrails and engine smoke to make tactical decisions. According to Kono, the team aimed to capture the "exhilaration of flying freely through the sky" by designing maps and assets in a true 1:1 scale, as opposed to the less-accurate scales used in previous installments. Considerable attention to detail was sought in designing the characters, models, and cutscene environments, which players would see up close in real time. Everything from the game's aircraft and their cockpit details, to individual props such as hamburgers and condiment bottles for scenes set in the FCU Endurance's mess deck, were designed "all relative to scale in terms of their polygon", while the character design process was intensive enough that designing and further refining Tasha, one of the player's wingmen, was so lengthy and involved that she was jokingly dubbed "the most expensive character". The city of Theve, a major location in the game's story, was closely modeled after the Canadian city of Toronto, with fictionalized renditions of real landmarks such as the CN Tower, Ontario Place, Billy Bishop Toronto City Airport, and the Well.

For research, the development team visited air bases, such as those on Okinawa Island, where they interviewed pilots to ensure the game's depictions were grounded and convincing, and recorded audio of jet aircraft flying. Implementation of the game's licensed aircraft and their weaponry was, per usual for the series, conducted with the cooperation of their manufacturers, who ensured details were accurate and provided technical feedback which, according to game producer Manabu Shimomoto, included "information that isn't publicly available", leading some developers to occasionally worry about whether they were handling classified information. The developers attempted to include aircraft from China, but licensing negotiations with the manufacturers proved unsuccessful. Kono stated that future Ace Combat installments would aim to include more aircraft from around the world.

The virtual reality mode of Ace Combat 7 inspired the first-person perspective of the cutscenes, as the development team felt that it provided a more immersive and emotional experience. A VR mode, planned to be more comprehensive than Ace Combat 7's equivalent, was initially considered, but the team realized that implementing VR support would require them to "develop two different games", both a VR version and a standard version, leading to it being canceled.

The game's soundtrack was composed by Keiki Kobayashi, Ryo Watanabe, and Rio Hamamoto, among others, led by music director Mitsuhiro Kitadani. For Ace Combat 8, Kitadani sought to use adaptive music to enhance "the main character experience" in gameplay.

Ace Combat 8: Wings of Theve was announced in December 2025 at The Game Awards. The game was released on Windows, PlayStation 5, and Xbox Series X/S on October 2, 2026. Players who preordered the game received a modern port of Ace Combat Zero: The Belkan War (2006). Players who preordered the Deluxe Edition also received an additional aircraft and early access to the game starting from September 29. A four-part prequel web series, Ace Combat 8: Hour Zero, was announced on September 10, with Josh Holloway, Brandon Routh, and Tamlyn Tomita playing lead roles. The first episode was released on September 15.

== Reception ==
Reception

Aggregate scores
Aggregator	Score
Metacritic	(PC) 86/100 (PS5) 88/100 (XSXS) 88/100
OpenCritic	99% recommend

Review scores
Publication	Score
Destructoid	9/10
GamesRadar+	4.5/5
Hardcore Gamer	4.5/5
IGN	9/10
PC Gamer (US)	92/100
PCGamesN	8/10
Push Square	8/10
Shacknews	9/10
The Guardian	5/5

Ace Combat 8: Wings of Theve received "generally favorable" reviews, according to review aggregator website Metacritic. Fellow review aggregator OpenCritic assessed that the game received "mighty" approval, being recommended by 99% of critics.

Ace Combat 8's overall gameplay and presentation was almost universally lauded by critics, who praised its sense of immersion, graphics and visual details, sound design, soundtrack spanning diverse genres, aircraft and weapon variety, and mission design. (Note: Attributed to multiple sources:) Even reviewers who were critical of other aspects of the game, such as the story, still felt that the aforementioned gameplay, visual, sound, and design elements largely made up for the negatives. The game's high graphical and visual quality was also noted to have been achieved with a smooth framerate and few, if any, noticeable glitches, crashes, or technical flaws. PC Gamer's Nova Wright called the game "an eye-watering, fist-pumping marriage of arcade action and cinematic flourish, and one of the best games I've played in years", while Game Rant's Nick Rodriguez summarized Ace Combat 8 as "a gripping reminder of what AAA gaming can accomplish when done right".

The game's story received mixed but generally positive reception. Many critics positively described the story as "melodramatic" and in-line with those of prior Ace Combat games, with Ace Combat 8 (and the wider Ace Combat series) being positively compared with Metal Gear, Armored Core, Top Gun, and Macross as a result. Certain praise was directed at the game's theming: Will Borger opened his review for IGN discussing the "startlingly relevant" themes of the "earnest story" and applauded its ability to be "unapologetically anti-war" despite being a game about aerial warfare, while Giovanni Colantonio, writing for Polygon, commended the game's "radical optimism" contrasting with the pessimism of the 2020s. GameSpot's Richard Wakeling lamented that the subjects of propaganda, social media, and disinformation were "ultimately window dressing" that the plot seemed to frame as "bad when the bad guys use it but good when the good guys do it", but he still felt that the story's earnest and "bombast" style made it "entertaining enough, especially when it indulges in absurdity in a way only Ace Combat can." The Guardian journalist Patrick Lum noted a tendency for odd shifts between natural-sounding dialogue and exposition; Colantonio opined that the late campaign felt "creatively stretched out"; and Rodriguez described the story as "inconsistently paced", "exposition-heavy", and harmed by the use of a silent protagonist; though all three still reported enjoying it. PCGamesN reviewer Paul Kelly stated it was "at its best when you don't take things seriously". Joe Chivers of TechRadar was more critical, calling the game's story "a narrative that feels it has earned plaudits that it doesn't deserve", and criticized multiple points where the campaign "spends hours building up a foe who then crumbles within a few minutes", adding that he felt the supporting characters outside Joker Flight felt "broadly cliched" and "tedious". Destructoid's Andrej Barovic observed that the serious and grim atmospheres of several story beats often melded poorly with Ace Combat's "clear inspiration from anime and shonen archetypes", leading to situations where characters bantered and joked "in the midst of some horrible battle". Eduard Gafton was sharply critical in his review for CGMagazine, opining that questionable localization and unengaging twists rendered the story "incoherent" and "[not] even remotely memorable". In a summation for Hardcore Gamer, Adam Beck called the story "hit or miss".

The cutscenes were polarizing. Many reviewers welcomed the cutscenes for improving characterization, the appeal of the characters and world, and the overall storytelling and plot. Writing for GamesRadar+, Scott McCrae opined that the early missions had an excessive amount of cutscenes, though he still appreciated them for making players grow attached to the wingmen and supporting cast. On the other hand, DualShockers's Jaime Tugayev, as well as Wakeling, Chivers, Beck, and Barovic, criticized the frequent use of what Tugayev called "pseudointeractivity", where the quick time event-esque interaction prompts were simply to progress the scene with no actual sense of interactivity or gameplay, which was compared with the "Press F to pay respects" cutscene from Call of Duty: Advanced Warfare.

Reviewers' opinions on Ace Combat Online were mixed. While those who tried Online generally found it to be enjoyable gameplay-wise, Colantonio felt multiplayer matches were too short to do anything interesting and Borger observed flaws in the grindy progression system, while Wakeling argued Online as a whole was too repetitive and unbalanced to sustain its playerbase in the long-term. Mentioning Online in a review for Kotaku, Moises Taveras also expressed concerns that its live service design and plans for bimonthly seasons were potentially too ambitious.

=== Sales ===
On October 9, 2026, Bandai Namco announced that Ace Combat 8 had sold over one million units worldwide, reaching the milestone faster than any previous entry in the series.

=== Awards ===
Year	Award	Category	Result	Ref.
2026	The Game Awards 2026	Best Action Game	Pending	
2026	The Game Awards 2026	Best Audio Design	Pending	
2026	The Game Awards 2026	Best Score & Music	Pending	
