= Ace Combat 7: Skies Unknown =

2019 video game

- Cover art featuring the F-22 Raptor
- Developer: Bandai Namco Studios
- Publisher: Bandai Namco Entertainment
- Directors: Yuta Hamanaka; Masashi Koyanagi
- Producers: Kazutoki Kono; Manabu Shimomoto
- Designer: Shinya Hirota
- Programmer: Masaki Iwabuchi
- Artist: Masato Kanno
- Writer: Sunao Katabuchi
- Composers: Keiki Kobayashi; Mitsuhiro Kitadani; Junichi Nakatsuru; Ryo Watanabe; Tetsukazu Nakanishi
- Series: Ace Combat
- Engine: Unreal Engine 4
- Platforms: PlayStation 4; Xbox One; Windows; Nintendo Switch
- Release: PlayStation 4, Xbox One; January 18, 2019; Windows; February 1, 2019; Nintendo Switch; July 11, 2024
- Genre: Air combat simulation
- Modes: Single-player, multiplayer

Ace Combat 7: Skies Unknown (Note: Japanese: エースコンバット7 スカイズ アンノウン, Hepburn: Ēsu Konbatto Sebun: Sukaizu An'nōn) is a 2019 combat flight simulation game developed by Bandai Namco Studios and published by Bandai Namco Entertainment. It is the eighth mainline installment in the Ace Combat series, and the first mainline installment since Ace Combat 6: Fires of Liberation (2007). Ace Combat 7's story marks the series' return to its traditional setting of Strangereal, and follows the exploits of "Trigger", a fighter pilot who is assigned to a penal squadron following an accusation of murder, in the midst of a war between the countries of Osea and Erusea.

The relative success of Ace Combat Infinity (2014) indicated that commercial and fan interest in the Ace Combat series remained strong after several years without a mainline installment. Development of Ace Combat 7 began shortly after, around 2015. It is the first game in the series to be built on Unreal Engine 4. Ace Combat 7 features a virtual reality mode with a set of missions developed for the PlayStation VR headset, an online multiplayer mode, and several downloadable content packs offering new missions and content.

Ace Combat 7 released on PlayStation 4 and Xbox One in January 2019, Windows in February 2019, and Nintendo Switch in July 2024, making it the first mainline title in the series to release on a Nintendo home console. (Note: The Nintendo 3DS title Ace Combat: Assault Horizon Legacy (2014) was a remake of Ace Combat 2 (1997).) It received generally positive reviews from critics and became the highest-selling entry in the series, with over 7 million units sold across all platforms by January 2026. A sequel, Ace Combat 8: Wings of Theve, was released on October 2, 2026.

== Gameplay ==
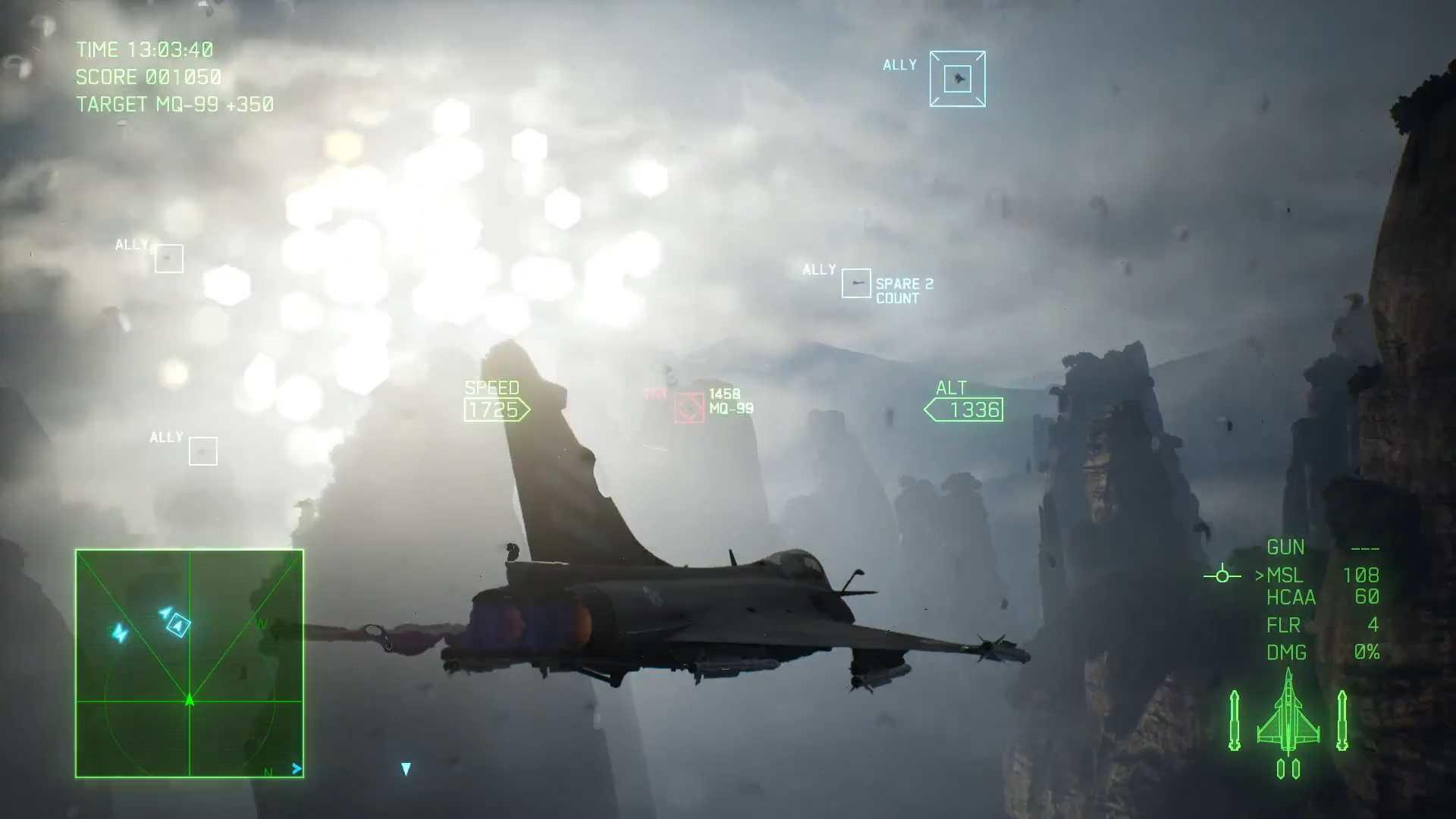
A gameplay screenshot of a player using a Dassault Rafale during a mission

Like other entries in the Ace Combat series, Ace Combat 7 is a combat flight simulation game in which the player pilots military aircraft to complete various objectives, ranging from dogfighting hostile aircraft, to conducting airstrikes, to battling high-tech superweapons. The game, and its wider series, forgoes a realistic flight model in favor of faster, arcade-like gameplay, with two control settings to accommodate different playstyles: "Normal" for simplified arcadey controls, and "Expert" for semi-realistic controls that allow for more challenging but precise maneuvers. Overall gameplay is similar to its predecessors, but due to Ace Combat 7 being built on a different engine and marking a resumption of the mainline series after over a decade, some changes and alterations were made to update the overall gameplay loop and feel.

During the single-player campaign, players are given a briefing prior to each mission, where they are informed of the situation, their objectives, the expected opposition, and environmental and terrain considerations, using a 3D map display. Players complete missions by destroying various air and surface targets, as well as accomplishing specific mission objectives such as destroying a specific priority target, protecting friendly units, or causing enough destruction. Computer-controlled wingmen accompany the player through each mission, providing exposition and limited combat support. Players can also complete optional aerial refueling or landing minigames before or after certain missions. Like most Ace Combat games, the story is largely progressed through briefings, radio communications during missions, and cutscenes between missions; Ace Combat 7's cutscenes are 3D-animated prerendered cutscenes similar to those in Ace Combat 6 and Infinity.

The game features 28 different aircraft at launch, with an additional 10 available from downloadable content and pre-order bonuses; these aircraft, both real and fictional, are categorized into fighters, attackers, and multiroles based on their design and role, each with their own specializations and vulnerabilities. In combat, players can use their aircraft's guns and missiles against all targets, as well as a limited selection of situational special weapons for each aircraft suiting their role. Special weapons include a variety of air-to-air missiles, air-to-ground weaponry, anti-ship missiles, and even laser weapons, among others; however, only one special weapon can be equipped at a time in a sortie. Returning from Ace Combat: Assault Horizon are countermeasures (flares and chaff simultaneously), which can be deployed to deter missiles that a player cannot outmaneuver or evade, though they have limited uses. Aircraft can be modified with "parts" that improve factors such as speed, maneuverability, weapon performance, and survivability. Aircraft, special weapons, and parts can be unlocked in an Infinity-inspired tech tree using "Military Result Points" (MRP), which are earned by completing missions.

Ace Combat 7 introduces clouds as a significant gameplay factor. Whereas clouds served as background scenery or level floors in prior games, in Ace Combat 7 clouds are level elements that can hinder vision, weaken missile guidance and lock-on distance, block laser weapons due to refraction, and cause aircraft to ice up and stall; occasionally, lightning strikes can also temporarily disrupt controls and sensors. Players, allies, and enemies are all affected by clouds, making them strategic factors in combat instead of mere obstacles.

=== Multiplayer ===
Ace Combat 7's multiplayer mode comprises the Team Deathmatch and Battle Royale player versus player modes, where players battle and shoot down their opposition to earn points against a timer. Team Deathmatch involves two teams of 2–4 players each, while Battle Royale is a free-for-all deathmatch; there is no co-op mode. Shooting down top-scoring players and those using higher-tier aircraft awards more points than shooting down worse-performing or lower-tier players. If a player's aircraft is destroyed, they respawn after a few seconds. When the time limit is reached, the team or player with the highest score is declared the winner.

== Synopsis ==
=== Setting ===
Ace Combat 7 is set in the series' fictional universe of Strangereal, where Earth has entirely different nations, geography, and history. The game's story details the 2019 Lighthouse War, fought between the Osean Federation and the Kingdom of Erusea in the continent of Usea. Following the Continental War, Osea brokered a peace treaty between the Federal Republic of Erusea and the rest of Usea, while the International Union (IUN) formed a Peacekeeping Force (IUN-PKF) for the continent. In 2011, Erusea restored its monarchy ruled by the D'Elise royal family, while former Osean President Vincent Harling ordered the construction of the International Space Elevator (ISEV), a space elevator and communications tower used to harness atmospheric energy, off the coast of western Usea near Erusea. The ISEV is protected by two massive Osean flying-wing airborne aircraft carrier drones, Arsenal Birds Liberty and Justice, carrying a large number of combat drones, advanced weaponry, and force fields, powered by microwave transmission from the ISEV. Though Harling framed the ISEV as promoting a lasting peace, Erusea perceived it as a symbol of Osean imperialism that infringed on Erusean sovereignty, with these resentments ultimately sparking the Lighthouse War.

Players control the game's silent protagonist, Osean fighter pilot "Trigger". The game's frame story is told through prerendered cutscenes played between missions, primarily from the point of view of three characters: Avril Mead, an Osean aircraft mechanic and penal laborer sent to work for Spare Squadron, an Osean penal military unit; Rosa Cossette D'Elise, the princess of Erusea; and Dr. Schroeder, a Belkan scientist developing advanced combat drone technology for the Erusean military.

=== Plot ===
Rising tensions between Osea and Erusea culminate when Erusea launches a surprise attack on Osea and captures much of the Usean continent, including the ISEV and both Arsenal Birds, with former Osean president Vincent Harling still in the ISEV during the attack. Avril, flying a refurbished F-104C Starfighter, is shot down in the crossfire between an Osean fighter and an Erusean drone, arrested for breaching wartime aviation laws, and sent to the Osean 444th Air Base, a military prison disguised as an air base, as a mechanic.

Trigger, part of an Osean IUN-PKF squadron in eastern Usea, engages Erusean forces, but the IUN-PKF suffers heavy losses to Arsenal Bird Liberty and Erusean ace Mihaly A. Shilage, who provides flight data for Dr. Schroeder's drone program. Trigger leads a mission to extract Harling from the ISEV, but an Osean missile strikes Harling's rescue aircraft, killing him. Trigger is accused of firing the missile, deemed guilty by court-martial, and transferred to the penal unit Spare Squadron at the 444th Air Base. Considered expendable, Spare Squadron is sent on dangerous near-suicide missions to probe Erusean drone defenses for weak points, frequently losing members in the process, but Trigger performs admirably, dueling Mihaly again during a sortie. Trigger's commendable actions leads to Spare Squadron being pardoned and transferred with the 444th to Tyler Island, while Trigger and his wingman Count are recruited by Osea's elite Long Range Strategic Strike Group (LRSSG). Osea and the IUN-PKF launch a counteroffensive against Erusea, destroying Liberty using the sole remaining Stonehenge railgun (Note: A railgun array previously featured in Ace Combat 04: Shattered Skies, built to disintegrate incoming asteroids) and liberating most of Usea. Meanwhile, Princess Cossette, who initially promoted anti-Osean sentiment, becomes disillusioned with the war.

Osea assaults and captures the Erusean capital of Farbanti, while Trigger duels Mihaly over the city, but they are interrupted when Osean and Erusean anti-satellite weapons cause a collisional cascade that sparks a global communications blackout. In the chaos, Erusea loses control over its AI-controlled drone fleet and collapses into a civil war between conservatives and radicals seeking to end and prolong the war respectively; Osean penal units go rogue; Mihaly flees to Shilage, a seceding Erusean state of which he is the heir to the throne; Dr. Schroeder travels to the ISEV to upload Mihaly's flight data to new advanced combat drones produced in automated factories; and the LRSSG is cut off from command and forced to operate independently. The LRSSG attempts to extract an Erusean conservative informant, who reveals Harling was killed by an Erusean drone that spoofed Osean IFF signals, but he is mistakenly killed by Osean forces amid post-blackout IFF failures.

Meanwhile, Avril and the 444th try to survive on Tyler Island, now the site of a multi-sided battle. They rescue Cossette from her crashed plane, lead an LRSSG-assisted evacuation of the island, and travel to the ISEV to seek aid; en route, Cossette realizes Harling had peaceful intentions with the ISEV and that the Erusean radicals lied to her to spark the war. Meanwhile, the LRSSG is forced to raid Shilage to replenish their supplies, but Mihaly intercepts them; in the ensuing duel, Trigger defeats Mihaly, who apologizes and begs Trigger to stop the drone threat before he crashes, leaving him unable to fly for the rest of his life. At the ISEV, Avril's group confronts Schroeder, and one of Mihaly's granddaughters destroys Mihaly's flight data before it can be uploaded. Schroeder reveals he sought revenge for Belka's historical loss by tricking the nations that defeated them into needless conflicts and developing drones trained on Mihaly's data that could destroy Osea, which annexed part of Belka. Disillusioned by the destruction his work caused, Schroeder agrees to help stop the automated drone factories, but reveals the data was already uploaded to two advanced drone fighters, "Hugin" and "Munin".

A joint Osean–Erusean coalition assaults the ISEV to seize it from Erusean radicals, while Cossette and Avril disable its microwave power transmissions, allowing Trigger to destroy the remaining Arsenal Bird Justice. However, Hugin and Munin arrive and repel the coalition, intending to complete the data transmission and forcibly prolong the war by endlessly mass-producing hostile drones. Trigger leads a counterattack on the ISEV and shoots down one of the drones, but the other, having learned off Trigger's data, flees into the ISEV itself. Trigger and Count pursue the drone and destroy it and the ISEV's signal repeaters, cutting off the transmission and ending the war. In the aftermath, the world begins to recover from the blackout, and Cossette, now the leader of Erusea's provisional government, leads the postwar peace movement in Harling's memory.

==== SP Missions ====
In the DLC missions, set just before the battle of Farbanti and the blackout, the LRSSG is tasked by Brigadier General Clemens with capturing the Alicorn, a railgun-equipped Erusean submarine aircraft carrier. The LRSSG failed to capture it after its Captain, Matias Torres, a mentally-unstable ultranationalist and his crew, destroy most of the Osean naval fleet. The LRSSG then raided Anchorhead Bay to prevent the Alicorn to join the Erusean forces, but it was proven to be a misinformation by a former member of Torres' crew. Trigger then defeats two mercenaries hired by Clemens to assassinate him. Clemens was subsequently arrested for treason.

the LRSSG learns the Alicorn and Torres has defected from the Erusean Navy and that Torres plans to destroy the Osean capital of Oured during the anti-war demonstrations at the anniversary of the end of the Continental War with Allicorn's nuclear artillery, killing at least a million lives, claiming that his goal is to horrify both sides into ending the war. Using sonobuoys and a magnetic anomaly detector to locate the Alicorn, the LRSSG and Osean anti-submarine planes force it to surface and engage it in a protracted battle, eventually destroying the Alicorn and killing Torres.

==== VR Mode ====
VR Mode's plot follows Ace Combat 04: Shattered Skies protagonist Mobius 1 as he joins the IUN-PKF to battle the Free Erusea terrorist group in 2014, five years prior to the events of the main game. This storyline occurs separately from the main plot.

== Development ==
Despite lackluster reviews, Ace Combat Infinity for the PlayStation 3 was a surprise hit for veteran fans, and commercial interest in the series by Bandai Namco was renewed, prompting internal development team Project Aces to develop a true sequel, the first mainline Ace Combat game since 2007's Ace Combat 6: Fires of Liberation for the Xbox 360.

Due to the original Ace Combat engine being in a state of limbo since the release of Infinity, Bandai Namco decided that rather than incur the costs of building a new Ace Combat engine from the ground up, Skies Unknown would be the first game in the franchise to be built on Epic Games' Unreal Engine 4. "trueSky", an Unreal Engine plugin that generates realistic clouds, played a notable role in the game's development, being one of the first additions to the game.

Ace Combat 7's development process used "sandaibanashi", a rakugo storytelling technique using three subjects; for Ace Combat 7, the subjects Project Aces used were "space elevator", "princess", and "three-dimensional cloud". A teaser trailer shown at PlayStation Experience 2015, a very early impression of the game created before development properly began, prominently featured all three subjects. Ace Combat series producer Kazutoki Kono told the development team the elements of the teaser had to appear in the game, and declined a suggestion that the teaser simply be a "product impression". The game was developed by Project Aces and Bandai Namco Studios Singapore, which used a "Western style" of development and organization compared to Project Aces' "Japanese style", resulting in a cultural gap that both teams had to overcome. Development was assisted by the Japan Air Self-Defense Force and the Japan Maritime Self-Defense Force, who offered technical advisors and aircraft information.

A significant amount of work went into the game's virtual reality mode, exclusive to PlayStation VR. Initially, the entire campaign was intended to be VR-compatible, and all of the game's cutscenes were created with VR compatibility to the point of audio post-production; however, they were canceled because of framerate issues with the PlayStation 4 and the difficulties in making VR missions, which were created separately from campaign missions. Ultimately, only three VR missions were added to the game, following a storyline separate to the main campaign; three more missions were planned but were not released. Much work also went into the game's sound effects and music, with the game's soundtrack by series composer Keiki Kobayashi.

Two-player local multiplayer was rumored to have been included, but was not added; in the final game, only online multiplayer exists. Development of the online multiplayer mode was designed to provide the same experience regardless of platform, location, or skill level, and playtesting was conducted overseas.

== Release ==
The 2015 announcement trailer

Ace Combat 7 was officially announced by Bandai Namco during PlayStation Experience in December 2015. Originally set to be released in 2017, the game's release was eventually delayed to 2018, before finally being released for the PlayStation 4 and Xbox One on January 18, 2019, and for Windows on February 1. Preorders for the game came with digital copies of Ace Combat 5: The Unsung War for the PlayStation 4, and Ace Combat 6: Fires of Liberation on the Xbox One. The game was also released on the Nintendo Switch on July 11, 2024, making this game the first installment of the series to be available on a Nintendo home console, not counting the series' spiritual spin-off The Sky Crawlers: Innocent Aces, released on the Wii.

Ace Combat 7 features post-release downloadable content that adds new aircraft, missions, roundels, squadron markings, and paint schemes. The earliest of these DLCs will be included for free in the Switch version. On May 26, 2022, DLC adding content from Top Gun: Maverick, (which was released the following day) was released.

== Reception ==
Reception

Aggregate scores
| Aggregator | Score |
|---|---|
| Metacritic | PC: 78/100; PS4: 80/100; XONE: 79/100; Switch: 86/100 |
| OpenCritic | 79% recommend |

Review scores
| Publication | Score |
|---|---|
| Eurogamer | 8/10 |
| Famitsu | 35/40 |
| Game Informer | 8/10 |
| GameRevolution | 8/10 |
| GameSpot | 8/10 |
| IGN | 7/10 |
| Forbes | 9/10 |

Ace Combat 7 received "generally favorable" reviews from critics, according to review aggregator website Metacritic. Fellow review aggregator OpenCritic assessed that the game received strong approval, being recommended by 79% of critics.

Famitsu magazine gave Ace Combat 7 a rating of 35/40, the highest of those reviewed in issue 1571. Digital Foundry's John Linneman recommended the game as a return to form of the Ace Combat series, and praised its gameplay, graphics, music, plot, and VR mode, deeming it an "absolute must-play". Forbes contributor Ollie Barder gave the game a 9/10, saying "while it can be a demanding game at times, it is definitely a rewarding one", though he lamented the limited scope of the VR compatibility and opined that the inclusion of only three VR missions did not justify buying PlayStation VR.

Eurogamer.it's Antonio Savino, Game Informer's Andrew Reiner, GameSpot's Edmond Tran, and GameRevolution's Jason Faulkner each gave Ace Combat 7 a rating of 8/10. Savino highlighted the game's graphics, sound, and music, though he noted that due to a lack of a "fairly convincing blur effect", things often felt "still", even at high speeds. Reiner highlighted its gameplay, sound, and presentation, but criticized the uneventful multiplayer experience and the campaign's "preposterous" plot, calling it "a Fast and the Furious story that is trying to be touching and serious, but it just doesn't mesh". Tran praised the game as marking the series' return to form as well as its gameplay and VR experience, but noted the campaign had "tedious" missions with sparse checkpoints. Faulkner said the game had a "great story" with excellent graphics and a replayable multiplayer mode, though he lamented the absence of features from previous titles such as wingman commands or branching campaign missions, criticized the game's design as being "a bit too safe", and noted the VR mode lacked motion sickness safeguards, making it difficult to play through, though he added that it was worth it.

IGN's Mike Epstein rated the game 7/10, approving of the graphics and overall gameplay experience, but criticizing its odd mission pacing, "convoluted" story with lengthy and unavoidable exposition, "poor communication of objectives", and "confusing controls", with his overall verdict stating that "It's enough to prove that there's room for the [Ace Combat] series to make a comeback, though this game will be not the one to jumpstart it.

Kazutoki Kono, responding to Epstein's IGN review on Twitter, criticized him for using Normal controls, which are basic and designed for newcomers, instead of Expert controls, which are more realistic and offer more control. Barder agreed with Kono and suggested that using Normal controls "just makes the game harder"; similarly, Faulkner noted that newcomers picking Normal "could accidentally play through the whole game [...] with controls that prevent them from getting the most out of the game".

=== Sales ===
In Japan, Ace Combat 7 sold 202,379 units for the PlayStation 4 during its first week, and sold 286,570 units by March 2019. In Southeast Asia, the game sold over 500,000 units within a month. In the United Kingdom, it had the highest debut sales in the series, entering the charts at second place overall.

By July 2020, Ace Combat 7 had sold over two million units, marking it a major commercial milestone for the franchise since Ace Combat 04: Shattered Skies in 2002. By January 2021, the game had sold over 2.5 million units worldwide, surpassing Ace Combat 04: Shattered Skies to become the franchise's best-selling title. The game continued to reach further sales milestones: over four million units by November 2022, over five million units by November 2023, and over six million units by January 2025.

=== Awards ===
| Year | Award | Category | Result | Ref. |
|---|---|---|---|---|
| 2019 | CEDEC Awards | Sound | Won | |
| 2019 | 2019 Golden Joystick Awards | Best VR/AR Game | Nominated | |
