= Clontz =

Clontz is a surname. Notable people with the surname include:

- Brad Clontz (born 1971), American baseball player
- Dennis Clontz (1951–2004), American playwright, journalist, and screenwriter
