= Nicholl Fellowships in Screenwriting =

AMPAS program founded in 1986

The Don and Gee Nicholl Fellowships in Screenwriting is a fellowship program founded in 1986 to aid screenwriters. It is administered by the Academy of Motion Picture Arts and Sciences, under the governance of the Academy Foundation Board.

== History ==
Gee Nicholl, widow of producer Don Nicholl, worked with Julian Blaustein in 1985 to develop the program with the Academy. The original 1986 winners were Allison Anders, Dennis Clontz, and Jeff Eugenides. 1989 fellow Radha Bharadwaj wrote the first screenplay made into a film, the 1991 drama Closet Land. Clontz won a Pulitzer Prize in 1994 and Eugenides won one in 2003. 1992 fellow Susannah Grant was the first nominated for an Academy Award, for the screenplay for Erin Brockovich.

As of the 2024 contest, 24 winning scripts have later been produced.

Starting in 2025, the Academy partnered with over 40 global universities and writing labs, as well as The Black List, to invite submissions for the fellowship.

== Fellows ==
=== 2020–present ===
2025 Nicholl Fellows

- Leo Aguirre, Verano
- Lynn McKee, I’m Ready to Go Anywhere
- Katla Sólnes, Eruption
- Omar Al Dakheel and Elie El Choufany, The Washroom
- Sara Crow and David Rafailedes, Satoshi

2024 Nicholl Fellows

- Alysha Chan and David Zarif, Miss Chinatown
- Colton Childs, Fake-A-Wish
- Charmaine Colina, Gunslinger Bride
- Ward Kamel, If I Die in America
- Wendy Britton Young, The Superb Lyrebird & Other Creatures

2023 Nicholl Fellows

- Brent Delaney, Brownie Mary
- c. Craig Patterson, Tah
- Harris McCabe, Nat Cady’s Boys
- J. Miller, Slugger
- Kayla Sun, Boy, Girl, Fig

2022 Nicholl Fellows

- Jennifer Archer, Into the Deep Blue
- Callie Bloem and Christopher Ewing, Tape 22
- Sam Boyer, Ojek
- J.M. Levine, Operation Gemini
- Timothy Ware-Hill, Tyrone and the Looking Glass

2021 Nicholl Fellows

- Haley Hope Bartels, Pumping Black
- Karin delaPeña Collison, Coming of Age
- Byron Hamel, Shade of the Grapefruit Tree
- R.J. Daniel Hanna, Shelter Animal
- Laura Kosann, The Ideal Woman

2020 Nicholl Fellows

- James Acker, Sadboi
- Beth Curry, Lemon
- Vanar Jaddou, Goodbye, Iraq
- Kate Marks, The Cow of Queens
- Jane Therese, Sins of My Father

=== 2010-2019 ===
2019 Nicholl Fellows

- Aaron Chung, Princess Vietnam
- Karen McDermott, Lullabies of La Jaula
- Renee Pillai, Boy with Kite
- Sean Malcolm, Mother
- Walker McKnight, Street Rat Allie Punches Her Ticket

2018 Nicholl Fellows

- Allison Buckmelter and Nicolas Buckmelter, American Refugee (Produced)
- Joey Clarke, Jr., Miles
- Grace Sherman, Numbers and Words
- Wenonah Wilms, Horsehead Girls

2017 Nicholl Fellows

- Vigil Chime, Bring Back Girl
- SJ Inwards, Jellyfish Summer
- Max Lance and Jen Bailey, The Queen of Sleaze
- KG Rockmaker, Last Days of Winter
- Cesar Vitale, The Great Nothing

2016 Nicholl Fellows

- Michele Atkins, Talking About the Sky
- Spencer Harvey and Lloyd Harvey, Photo Booth
- Geeta Malik, Dinner with Friends
- Elizabeth Oyebode, Tween the Ropes
- Justin Piasecki, Death of an Ortolan

2015 Nicholl Fellows

- Amy Tofte, Addis Abeka
- Andrew Friedhof, Great Falls
- Anthony Grieco, Best Sellers (Produced)
- Elizabeth Chomko, What They Had (Produced)
- Sam Regnier, Free Agent

2014 Nicholl Fellows

- Sam Baron, The Science of Love and Laughter
- Alisha Brophy & Scott Miles, United States of Fuckin' Awesome
- Melissa Iqbal, The Death Engine
- Sallie West, Moonflower

2013 Nicholl Fellows

- Frank DeJohn & David Alton Hedges, Legion
- Patty Jones, Joe Banks
- Alan Roth, Jersey City Story
- Stephanie Shannon, Queen of Hearts
- Barbara Stepansky, Sugar in My Veins

2012 Nicholl Fellows

- Nikole Beckwith, Stockholm, Pennsylvania (Produced)
- Sean Robert Daniels, Killers
- James DiLapo, Devils at Play
- Allan Durand, Willie Francis Must Die Again
- Michael Werwie, Extremely Wicked, Shockingly Evil and Vile (Produced)

2011 Nicholl Fellows

- Chris Bessounian & Tianna Langham, Guns and Saris
- Dion Cook, Cutter
- John MacInnes, Outside the Wire
- Matthew Murphy, Unicorn
- Abel Vang & Burlee Vang, The Tiger's Child

2010 Nicholl Fellows

- Destin Daniel Cretton, Short Term 12 (Produced)
- Marvin Krueger, And Handled with a Chain
- Andrew Lanham, The Jumper of Maine
- Micah Ranum, A Good Hunter (Produced)
- Cinthea Stahl, Identifying Marks

=== 2000-2009 ===
2009 Nicholl Fellows

- Matt Ackley, Victoria Falls
- Vineet Dewan and Angus Fletcher, Sand Dogs
- John Griffin, Dream Before Waking
- Nidhi Anna Verghese, Jallianwala Bagh
- Jeff Williams, Pure

2008 Nicholl Fellows

- Jeremy Bandow, Hive
- Ken Kristensen & Colin Marshall, Out of Breath
- Jason A. Micallef, Butter (Produced)
- Eric Nazarian, Giants
- Lee Patterson, Snatched

2007 Nicholl Fellows

- Amy Garcia & Cecilia Contreras, Amelia Earhart and the Bologna Rainbow Highway
- Michael L. Hare, The Fly Fisher
- Sidney King, Kalona
- David Mango, Kissing a Suicide Bomber
- Andrew Shearer & Nicholas J. Sherman, Holy Irresistible

2006 Nicholl Fellows

- Alfred E. Carpenter & Mark A. Matusof, 38 Mercury
- Arthur M. Jolly, The Free Republic of Bobistan
- Stephanie Lord, Palau Rain
- Josh D. Schorr, 10 Day Contract
- Scott K. Simonsen, Tides of Summer

2005 Nicholl Fellows

- Morgan Read-Davidson, The Days Between
- Seth Resnik & Ron Moskovitz, Fire in a Coal Mine
- Michael D. Zungolo, No Country
- Colleen Cooper De Maio, Pirates of Lesser Providence
- Gian Marco Masoni, Ring of Fire

2004 Nicholl Fellows

- Sean Mahoney, Fenian's Trace
- Daniel Lawrence, The Gaza Golem
- Doug Davidson, Letter Quest
- Whit Rummel, The Secret Boy
- John Sinclair & Nova Jacobs, Split Infinity

2003 Nicholl Fellows

- Andrea R. Herman, Augmentation
- Tejal K. Desai & Brian C. Wray, Linda and Henry
- Annie Reid, Revival
- Bragi Schut Jr., Season of the Witch (Produced)
- James N. Mottern, Trucker (Produced)

2002 Nicholl Fellows

- John Ciarlo, Bend in the River
- Matt Harris, Moon of Popping Trees (Produced as Dead for a Dollar)
- Pamela Kay, Nude and Naked
- Kurt Kuenne, Mason Mule
- Creighton Rothenberger, The Chosin

2001 Nicholl Fellows

- Patricia Burroughs, Redemption
- Greg M. Dawless, One Hour Development
- Robert S. Edwards, Land of the Blind (Produced)
- Albert Letizia, The Northern Lights
- Cameron B. Young, Saint Vincent

2000 Nicholl Fellows

- Doug Atchison, Akeelah and the Bee (Produced)
- Alfredo Botello, The Crasher
- Gabrielle Burton, The Imperial Waltz
- Christine R. Downs, Victory Road
- James M. Foley, Powder River Breakdown

=== 1990-1999 ===
1999 Nicholl Fellows

- Chris E. Balibrera, Harvest
- T. J. Lynch, The Beginning of Wisdom
- Annmarie E. Morais, Bleeding
- Jaime David Silverman, Last Meals
- Rebecca A. Sonnenshine, Mermaid Dreams

1998 Nicholl Fellows

- Jacob A. Estes, Mean Creek (Produced)
- Robert H. Gyde, Jelly-Babies
- Donna McNeely, Julia's Child
- Karen M. Moncrieff, Blue Car (Produced)
- Michael A. Rich, Finding Forrester (Produced)

1997 Nicholl Fellows

- Glen Craney, Whisper the Wind
- Scott Ferraiolo, The Palace of Versailles
- Anthony J. Jaswinski, Interstate
- Karen Otoole, Wild Horses
- Michele Sutter, This Place in the Ways

1996 Nicholl Fellows

- Will Chandler, Cyrano of Linden View
- Ehren Kruger, Arlington Road (Produced)
- Carlton Proctor, Sommerville
- Brian Teshera, ...In a Heartbeat
- Craig von Wiederhold, Dead Eyes

1995 Nicholl Fellows

- Richard Cray, Love, Squid & Pavarotti
- Scott Fifer, Starstruck
- Patrick Gilfillan, G.U. (Geographically Undesirable)
- Robley Wilson, Land Fishers

1994 Nicholl Fellows

- Max D. Adams, My Back Yard
- Steve Garvin, Status Quo
- Charles Henrich, Joshua Tree
- Glenn Levin, Spano and the Kid

1993 Nicholl Fellows

- Victoria Jennings Arch, A Terrible Beauty
- Bob Bridges, Doniphan of the Americas
- Myron E. Goble, Down in the Delta (Produced)
- Jodi Ann Johnson, Mama & Me
- Dawn O'Leary, Island of Brilliance (Produced)

1992 Nicholl Fellows

- Robert N. Cohen, The Good Ole Boy
- Susannah Grant, Island Girl
- Andrew W. Marlowe, The Lehigh Pirates
- Terri Edda Miller, Bedwarmer
- Michelle Wollmers, Infidels

1991 Nicholl Fellows

- Len Alaria, War Cry
- Peter Crow, Trace
- Raymond De Felitta, Begin the Beguine
- Ronald Emmons, By Bread Alone
- Brian Reich, Baubles

1990 Nicholl Fellows

- David Gordon, Rocketman
- Robert Gregory Browne, Low Tide
- Kent Rizley, The Gentlemen
- Thomas Smith, Slings and Arrows
- Wanda Warner, Chief to Chief

=== 1986-1989 ===
1989 Nicholl Fellows

- Radha Bharadwaj, Closet Land (Produced)
- Mark Lowenthal, Where the Elephant Sits (Produced)
- James McGlynn, Traveller (Produced)
- Deborah Pryor, Briar Patch (Produced)
- Laverne Stringer, The Cotton Gin Athletic Club

1988 Nicholl Fellows

- No fellowships awarded

1987 Nicholl Fellows

- Christopher Bishop, Swampers
- Kevin Coffey, Fadeaway
- Sallie Groo, Daughters of Music
- Marie Angela Kellier, Solita's Rise
- Randall McCormick, Giant Steps
- Warren Taylor, In the Dark (Produced)
- Priscilla Waggoner, Mother's Nature

1986 Nicholl Fellows

- Allison Anders, Lost Highway
- Dennis Clontz, Generations (play)
- Jeff Eugenides, Here Comes Winston, Full of the Holy Spirit (fiction)
