= Kazutoki =

- Gender: Male

Origin
- Origin: Japanese
- Meaning: Different meanings depending on the kanji used

Kazutoki (written: 和時 or 一聡) is a masculine Japanese given name. Notable people with the name include:

- Kazutoki Kono (河野 一聡), Japanese video game producer
- Kazutoki Umezu (梅津 和時) (born 1949), Japanese jazz saxophonist
