= Lisa Zeno Churgin =

American film editor

- Born: January 20, 1955 (age 71)
- Occupation: Film editor

Lisa Rachel Zeno Churgin (born January 20, 1955) is an American film editor with more than 25 film credits; she was nominated for the Academy Award for Best Film Editing for the 1999 film The Cider House Rules (directed by Lasse Hallström). Since 2002, Churgin has also served as the president of the Motion Picture Editors Guild. Churgin's editing of House of Sand and Fog (directed by Vadim Perelman-2003) was nominated for the Satellite Award for Best Editing.

Churgin has been elected to membership in the American Cinema Editors.

== Filmography ==
=== Films ===
Year	Title	Director	Notes
1979	The Warriors	Walter Hill	Assistant editor
1980	The Long Riders	Walter Hill	Assistant editor
1980	Raging Bull	Martin Scorsese	Assistant editor
1981	Southern Comfort	Walter Hill	Assistant editor
1981	Ragtime	Miloš Forman	Assistant editor
1984	Solo	Lyman Dayton	
1985	Mask	Peter Bogdanovich	Assistant editor
1985	Spies Like Us	John Landis	Assistant editor
1986	Three Amigos	John Landis	First assistant editor
1988	Vibes	Ken Kwapis	First assistant editor
1988	The Accidental Tourist	Lawrence Kasdan	First assistant editor
1990	Love at Large	Alan Rudolph	
1991	Closet Land	Radha Bharadwaj	
1991	Samantha	Stephen La Rocque	
1992	Bob Roberts	Tim Robbins	
1993	The Wrong Man	Jim McBride	
1994	Reality Bites	Ben Stiller	
1995	Unstrung Heroes	Diane Keaton	
1995	Dead Man Walking	Tim Robbins	
1997	Gattaca	Andrew Niccol	
1999	200 Cigarettes	Risa Bramon Garcia	
1999	The Cider House Rules	Lasse Hallström	Nominated — Academy Award for Best Film Editing
2001	The Wedding Planner	Adam Shankman	
2002	Moonlight Mile	Brad Silberling	
2002	Waking Up in Reno	Jordan Brady	
2003	House of Sand and Fog	Vadim Perelman	Nominated — Satellite Award for Best Editing
2004	Embedded	Tim Robbins	Video film
2005	Mozart and the Whale	Petter Næss	Co-edited with Miklos Wright
2005	In Her Shoes	Curtis Hanson	Co-edited with Craig Kitson
2006	The Last Kiss	Tony Goldwyn	
2008	Henry Poole Is Here	Mark Pellington	
2008	Pride and Glory	Gavin O'Connor	Co-edited with John Gilroy
2009	Tenderness	John Polson	Co-edited with Andrew Marcus
2009	The Ugly Truth	Robert Luketic	
2011	Priest	Scott Stewart	
2012	One for the Money	Julie Anne Robinson	
2012	Pitch Perfect	Jason Moore	
2015	Barely Lethal	Kyle Newman	
2016	Pete's Dragon	David Lowery	
2018	The Old Man & the Gun	David Lowery	
2020	An American Pickle	Brandon Trost	
2020	Through the Glass Darkly	Lauren Fash	Co-edited with Adriaan van Zyl
2023	Peter Pan & Wendy	David Lowery	
2023	Daddio	Christy Hall	
2024	Goodrich	Hallie Meyers-Shyer	
TBA	The Man Who Saved Paris	Robert Budreau	Post-production

=== Television ===
Year	Programme	Studio	Episode(s)	Notes
1998	From the Earth to the Moon	HBO	Season 1 E02 "Apollo One"; E11 "The Original Wives Club"	TV Mini-series
2013	Trophy Wife	ABC	Season 1 E01 "Pilot"	
2015	Grace and Frankie	Netflix	Season 1 E01 "The End"; E04 "The Funeral"; E07 "The Spelling Bee"; E10 "The Elevator"; E12 "The Bachelor Party"	
