= Press F to pay respects =

Internet meme

Screenshot from Call of Duty: Advanced Warfare, where the prompt is visible both on the screen and over the coffin

"Press F to pay respects" is an Internet meme that originated from Call of Duty: Advanced Warfare, a 2014 first-person shooter in Activision's Call of Duty franchise. It originated as a set of instructions conveyed during an in-game quick time event at a funeral service. Widely mocked by critics and players due to the view of its forced element of interactivity that was not perceived to be tastefully executed, the phrase would later become a notable Internet meme in its own right. It is sometimes used by Internet commenters to convey solidarity and sympathy, either sarcastic or sincere, in response to unfortunate events.

== Origin ==
In Call of Duty: Advanced Warfare, the default control to "use" or interact with an object is F on PC, on Xbox, and on PlayStation, with the latter two buttons being held instead of pressed. The prompt "Press F to Pay Respects" ("Hold to Pay Respects" in Xbox versions and "Hold to Pay Respects" in PlayStation versions) appears during a scene where the player character mourns the death of his comrade, who was killed saving his life in battle. When the player presses the key, the character steps forward and places his right hand on his comrade's coffin for several seconds, then turns around to leave.

According to Advanced Warfare level designer Steve Bianchi, this was a last-minute change: the original segment had the player hammer a pin into the coffin per Navy SEAL funeral rites, but the creative team had to change the scene after a military advisor objected to using a Navy SEAL tradition, as the character in question is a U.S. Marine. In an interview with theScore esports, Advanced Warfare screenwriter John MacInnes described the prompt as "a byproduct of late-stage game development" that he did not have control over, adding he did not know it was in the game until a journalist asked him about it.

A similar prompt had appeared previously in the 2011 video game Batman: Arkham City. In a section where Batman can visit the alley where his parents, Thomas and Martha Wayne, were murdered, the prompt " Pay Your Respects" (" Pay Your Respects" in PlayStation versions) appears if the player chooses to approach the chalk outlines of their bodies. Andrew Vestal of Gamasutra noted that the difference between the two games was that in Arkham City, the prompt was optional, and that "Ultimately, it doesn't matter if the player decides to pay their respects or to keep on walking. The point has been made."

== Reception ==
Upon the release of Advanced Warfare in November 2014, many critics and players mocked the cutscene for its forced or awkward element of interactivity that seemed out of place at a memorial service. The mechanic was frequently criticized and ridiculed for both being arbitrary and unnecessary, as well as being inappropriate to the mournful tone of the funeral the game otherwise intended to convey. (Note: Attributed to multiple sources:)

In 2014, late night show celebrity Conan O'Brien reviewed Advanced Warfare on a "Clueless Gamer" episode and criticized the scene. Paste described the mourning process, which takes the form of a quick time event, as terrifically funny with the potential to catch on as a viral meme.

== Spread ==
The phrase has since become detached from its source and sometimes used in a sincere manner. (Note: Attributed to multiple sources:) In the years after the release of Advanced Warfare, users began typing a singular "F" in chat windows on websites such as Twitch to convey condolences or a sense of sorrow when reacting to any unfortunate news on the Internet, leading streamers and others to refer to this with the phrase "F in the chat". A notable example of "F in the chat" was in the tribute stream for the Jacksonville Landing shooting, where some viewers responded to the proceedings by posting a single letter "F" in the chat.

== Legacy ==
In retrospect, Morgan Park of PC Gamer described the meme as Call of Duty's greatest legacy. Vitor Braz of GameRevolution described it as one of the most popular video game memes of all time. Cecilia D'Anastasio of Kotaku referred to the meme as iconic, and further stated that it's not because it's "uniquely stupid", but because "the balance between 'sad' and 'flippant' is so hilariously lopsided". Ky Shinkle of Screen Rant described it as a video gaming meme that never gets old, and stated that it's common among gamers when "F" appears in unfortunate news or circumstances.
