= Kazutoki Kono =

Japanese video game producer

- 河野 一聡
- Born: Shinjuku, Tokyo, Japan
- Education: Kobe Design University
- Occupations: Game producer Game director Video game artist
- Years active: 1992–present
- Employer: Bandai Namco Entertainment

Kazutoki Kono (河野 一聡, Kōno Kazutoki) is a Japanese video game producer who works for Bandai Namco Entertainment, best known for his involvement in the Ace Combat series.

== Works ==
Year	Title	Role	Co-worker
1996	Rage Racer	Background visuals	many others
1997	Ace Combat 2	Game visuals	many others
1998	R4: Ridge Racer Type 4	Art director	
2001	Ace Combat 04: Shattered Skies	Art director	
2004	Ace Combat 5: The Unsung War	Director	
2011	Ace Combat: Assault Horizon	Producer	Hiroyuki Ichiyanagi
2014	Ace Combat Infinity	Producer	
2019	Ace Combat 7: Skies Unknown	Producer	
2026	Ace Combat 8: Wings of Theve	Director	
