= Ace Combat Infinity =

2014 combat flight simulation video game

- Developer: Project Aces
- Publisher: Bandai Namco Games
- Director: Natsuki Isaki
- Producer: Kazutoki Kono
- Designers: Jun Tamaoki; Taichi Wada
- Programmer: Masato Aikawa
- Artist: Kosuki Itomi
- Writers: Kosuke Itomi; Yuta Hamanaka
- Composers: Rio Hamamoto; Hiroshi Okubo
- Series: Ace Combat
- Platform: PlayStation 3
- Release: JP: May 20, 2014; NA: May 27, 2014; EU: May 28, 2014
- Genre: Air combat simulation
- Modes: Single-player, multiplayer

Ace Combat Infinity (Note: Japanese: エースコンバット インフィニティ, Hepburn: Ēsu Konbatto Infiniti) is a 2014 combat flight simulation video game developed by Project Aces and published by Bandai Namco Games for the PlayStation 3. It is the sixteenth title in the Ace Combat series, and was released worldwide in May 2014. It is the first partially free-to-play title in the series, and unlike most games in the series, Infinity takes place on Earth. Still, it includes certain elements from past Ace Combat games, namely historical events, organizations, superweapons and original aircraft.

Bandai Namco officially ceased all of the game's services on March 31, 2018, although a group of fans managed to restore complete functionality to most of Infinity's main features and modes via private server or self-hosted servers in May 2026. However, the project (dubbed "Operation Eternal Liberation") currently only works through RPCS3 emulation.

== Gameplay ==
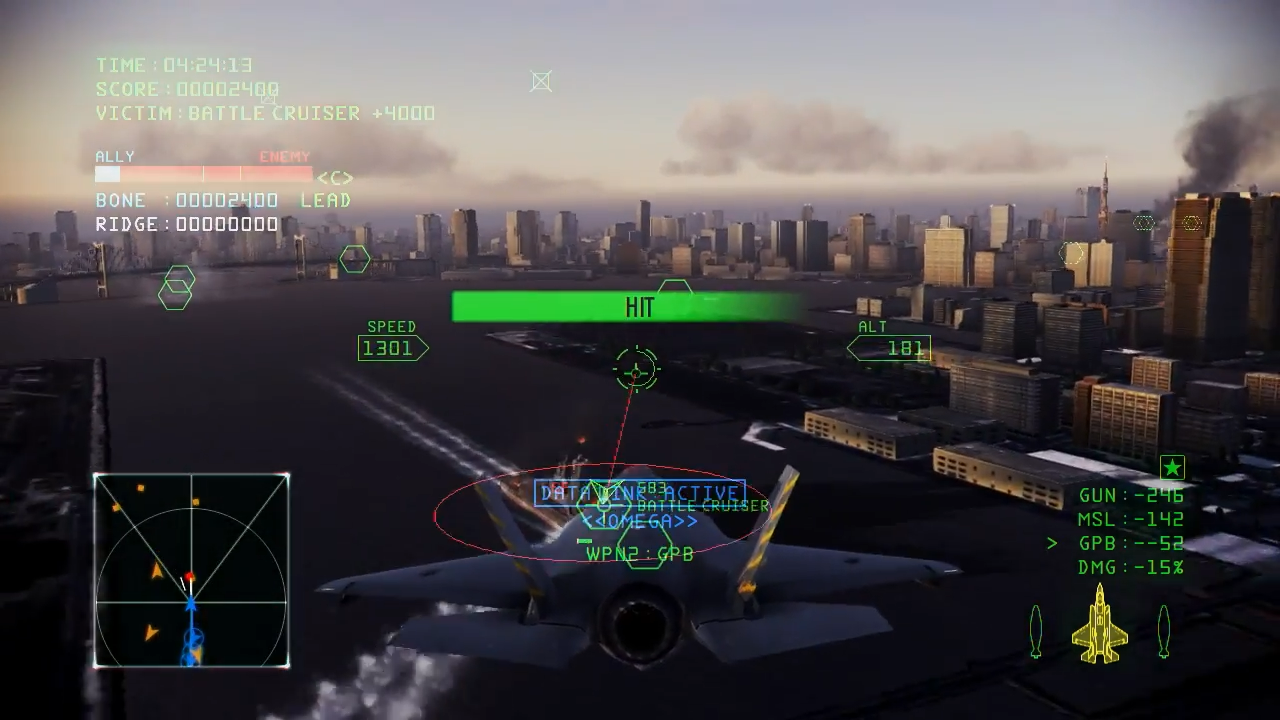
Gameplay showing a player in a Lockheed Martin F-35 Lightning II bombing a battle cruiser

Ace Combat Infinity is a combat flight simulation game but it is presented in a more arcade-like format in contrast to other flight-sim games. The game has three modes: story, tutorial, and the multiplayer deathmatch/cooperative mode. Players could log on to the game itself through their PlayStation Network accounts. To fly in the story or multiplayer missions, the player will use one fuel credit; three Supplied Fuel units are rechargeable after a set period of time while Stocked Fuel credits were available as a mission reward or bought at the PlayStation Store. A lobby system allows the players to go through eight story missions and 39 multiplayer missions, with a few being Special Raid Missions that involve players taking on superweapons.

Infinity has around 50 licensed jet aircraft representing modern designs from the United States, Europe, and Russia, with the F-4 Phantom as the player's first plane. Further updates since the game's release gave players a chance to use some of the Ace Combat franchise's iconic superfighters as well as the Japanese ATD-0 Shinshin technology demonstrator. As they play through the game, they can earn enough experience points to advance in rank and in the global leaderboards for every tournament.

The game's mission reward system is based on drops of red or gold boxes; aside from possibly earning one, three, or five Stocked Fuel credits, players can win small amounts of credit, aircraft paint schemes and logos, Supply Ticket virtual coupons, and higher-performance versions of existing airplanes. The Supply Tickets are to be exchanged in a game catalogue for certain special airplanes (except for aircraft that are tournament rewards), skins and logos, radio messages, and nicknames. Players will also have a chance to research upgrades to their current aircraft through a special development tree, which will include options for new aircraft, aircraft parts, and weapons. The special aircraft, skins and logos include those from other Ace Combat titles, including the original Scarface Squadron (Phoenix) skins from the first Ace Combat game as well as those from notable air combat franchises such as Area 88 and Namco's own game franchises. To celebrate the 60th anniversary of the JASDF, Namco Bandai included a special F-15J & F-2A that were featured at the 2014 Air Festival at Misawa Air Base in Japan. The US Department of Defense also authorized the use of the VF-84/VF-103 Jolly Roger high-visibility paint schemes for the F-14D and F/A-18F, the VMFA-232 skin for the F/A-18F, as well as renditions of the F-117, F-15C & F-16C in US flag livery. In mid September 2015, the game's 11th update was released and introduced piston fighters from the Second World War such as the P-38 Lightning, Messerschmitt Bf 109, Supermarine Spitfire and the A6M Zero

== Plot ==
=== Setting and characters ===
Ace Combat Infinity is set in an alternate timeline, in which Earth was ravaged by the "Ulysses Disaster". In 1994, a fictional asteroid collides with one of Jupiter's moons, 5254 Ulysses. This event sends about 10,000 meteors heading for Earth, all expected to impact the planet in five years' time. Faced with the prospect of extinction, the world's major superpowers build "Stonehenge", a network of anti-meteor railguns across the planet. The meteor storm finally hits Earth in July 1999. While Stonehenge destroys enough of the inbound meteors to prevent human extinction, the remaining meteors still ravaged about 20% of the Earth's surface, destabilizing the economy and collapsing the world order. The disaster hits Europe and Asia especially hard, forcing the nations to reorganize and create autonomous refugee zones. Twenty years later, the United Nations find itself fighting against terrorist organizations around the world. To better combat the terrorist threat, the UN hires Arrows Air Defense and Security, a private military company specializing in aerial warfare.

The player character and silent protagonist, callsign "Reaper", is a rookie pilot employed by Arrows. Arrows assigns Reaper to the "Bone Arrow" squadron, which includes long-time pilot "Omega" and ace veteran "Viper". Part-way through the story, Bone Arrow becomes rivals with Ridgeback Squadron, a squadron of elite UNF pilots headed by leader "Slash" and his second-in-command, "Edge". The main antagonist forces are the Sons of Troia, a group of armed terrorists who later create an independent "Federation of USEA" or USEA Federation. Reaper's actions against the Sons of Troia and USEA soon make him a recognized mercenary ace pilot.

Elements in the game, such as the Ulysses disaster, the Stonehenge superweapon and the rise of the USEA enemy faction (the "United States of EurAsia", a new multinational military federation rather than a fictional continent) are direct references to Ace Combat 4: Shattered Skies, but played on Earth instead of "Strangereal", the fictional planet setting of previous Ace Combat games. Furthermore, the player character taking the role of a mercenary pilot of a private military company hired by the UN to keep the "post-Ulysses" world stable to regional dispute and terrorist attacks, is similar to the storyline of Ace Combat Zero: The Belkan War. Other elements, including fictional aircraft, names of locales and specific mission settings, reference elements of previous games in the franchise.

=== Plot ===
In early 2019, Reaper, a new recruit for the Arrows PMC's "Bone Arrows" Squadron, is deployed for his first mission in Tokyo, working with teammate Omega to destroy several UAVs attacking the UNF Pacific Fleet stationed in the harbor. The two are subsequently redeployed, alongside veteran pilot Viper, to defend the Comona Aerospace Center in the West Indies against another airstrike. Evidence points to the aircraft being used by a terrorist group called the "Sons of Troia", but other materials bear the markings of an international company called Wernher-Noah Enterprises, which denies involvement. The Bone Arrows join the UN Forces in a rescue operation to save the "Greymen", a top circle of world leaders who were kidnapped by the Sons of Troia and held somewhere in the Iyuli refugee zone in Russia. The UN troops reach the Greymen's purported location, but the hostages are nowhere to be found, and the troops are promptly surprised by a barrage of railgun fire. The Bone Arrows and the UN's elite "Ridgeback" team are among the UN units able to escape the area. The UN confirms that the shots came from a Turkish Stonehenge Type-3 base, captured by the Sons of Troia prior to the rescue operation. The Bone Arrows, the Ridgebacks, and the UN Marines work together to destroy the gun installation, with "Reaper", gradually gaining a reputation.

The Sons of Troia make a public statement after the Stonehenge raid through its leader Kacper Cohen, a former Wernher-Noah executive fired by the UN for working on a secret space weapons project. Cohen claims the UN has been fully concentrated on the wishes of the world's superpowers, not the Ulysses refugees. Having executed the nine Greymen, he declares the creation of the United States of Eurasia (USEA), a federation of multiple nations across the southern Eurasian continent. All military forces in southern Eurasia pledge loyalty to the USEA and take over their occupying regions; the UN, slow to respond and few in number, sends all of their forces to counterattack the USEA forces in Dubai and Tokyo. Bone Arrow and the Ridgebacks fly to Tokyo to aid the UNF assault but run into tough opposition led by a large airborne fortress and an advanced aircraft—known as the "Butterfly Master"—controlling laser-armed drones. During the battle, Slash ejects but is killed by the drones; his wingman, Edge, is enraged, and it takes Viper to restrain her. Reaper takes down the Butterfly Master and leads the assault against the airborne command cruiser. The UNF liberates Tokyo and forces the Useans to retreat.

Having taken heavy losses in the operation, the Arrows accept the UNF's offer to join Task Force 118 "Arrowblades", a special combat force to take on the USEA army alongside the Ridgebacks and several mercenary units. Their first mission is to attack an ICBM launch facility located in Russia's (fictional) Avalon Dam. With an AL-1B missile interceptor providing cover to stop any missile launches, the Arrowblades forces stream through a canyon to attack Avalon Dam and have the UN Marines open the silo doors. However, despite destroying the ICBMs, the strike team is caught off-guard by another, hidden ICBM prepared for launch against Washington, D.C.; all remaining planes successfully shoot down the missile. Upon returning to base, they find out that the USEA forces want to bring the war to the United States, and that the AL-1B had been mysteriously shot down. In May 2020, the UNF scrambles Task Force 118 from their base in San Diego to intercept a large wave of USEA planes that took off from South America, and encounter them over Area B7R in Nevada. Edge is badly hit throughout the battle and is forced to withdraw. The UNF planes pull out after defeating all enemy aircraft, but the Butterfly Master—believed killed in the Tokyo operation—reappears with a formation of drones. The Arrowblades destroy the Butterfly Master's plane but learn that it is also a combat drone, and its remote pilot remains alive. Five months later, Task Force 118 and the UNF take the fight to the USEA by launching Operation Bunker Shot, an amphibious operation targeting USEA territory in Eastern Europe. The landing forces who come ashore in Croatia are attacked by an orbital weapon, revealed to be the project Cohen was working on. The remainder of the UNF invasion force breaks through, and the USEA forces withdraw, signifying the start of a long campaign to defeat the USEA. The game's final cutscene revealed to players that the Butterfly Master was actually a young girl situated in a satellite in a Low Earth Orbit who, after her defeat in Nevada, dedicates herself to hunting "that Ribbon Guy," a reference to Reaper. A secret cutscene reveals a red version of the Mobius Squadron emblem, though it is unknown whether it belongs to Reaper or another version of Mobius 1.

== Development ==
Infinity had a lengthy teaser campaign by Bandai Namco and Kazutoki Kono (director of Ace Combat: Assault Horizon), consisting of posts from the Twitter accounts of Project Aces and Kono along with a website for the game published on July 11, giving various hints to fans of the series to decipher. The game's title and certain vague details were revealed through a 46-second trailer released on July 19, 2013.

On August 2, a second teaser trailer was released containing more information on the game's single-player elements. The second trailer confirmed that the Stonehenge railgun network from Ace Combat 04: Shattered Skies, along with the "Estovakian Aerial Fleet" (composed of numerous aerial fortresses) from Ace Combat 6: Fires of Liberation, were to make an appearance in Infinity. In addition, an AWACS unit codenamed Sky-Eye was to be a recurring character, also referencing Ace Combat 04. The game itself was simultaneously announced on Bandai Namco Games Europe's website, where it was also revealed that the game would use the free-to-play model (the first in the series to do so). Olivier Comte, Senior Vice President of BANDAI NAMCO Games Europe, said: "The Ace Combat franchise has evolved dramatically over the years, but never before have we been able to offer its amazing graphics and tactical action for free. The team at Project Aces listens very carefully to its players, and is bringing the best the series has to offer to ACE COMBAT INFINITY, with plenty of new surprises too".

On February 4, 2014 (after a false start in November and a Japan-only beta in December), a week-long beta for Infinity was publicly released worldwide. It featured the first two missions from the single player campaign and a work-in-progress competitive multiplayer mode. Players could submit feedback to the development team during the beta phase, which went into consideration during the production of the final release.

The game became officially available worldwide in May 2014.

== Reception ==
Reception

Aggregate score
Aggregator	Score
Metacritic	54/100

Review scores
Publication	Score
Edge	4/10
GameSpot	6/10
IGN	6.9/10
Jeuxvideo.com	8/20
The Guardian	3/5
El Español	7.5/10
Irish Independent	7/10
Push Square	5/10

Ace Combat Infinity has a score of 54% on Metacritic.

GameSpot awarded it a score of 6 out of 10, saying: "The soaring bird that has long served as the metaphor for the Ace Combat pilot becomes a vulture fighting over highway carrion, looping away incautiously when the odd car passes a little too close, before returning again for a final few scraps of flesh".
