= John MacInnes (writer) =

Anglo-American screenwriter and director

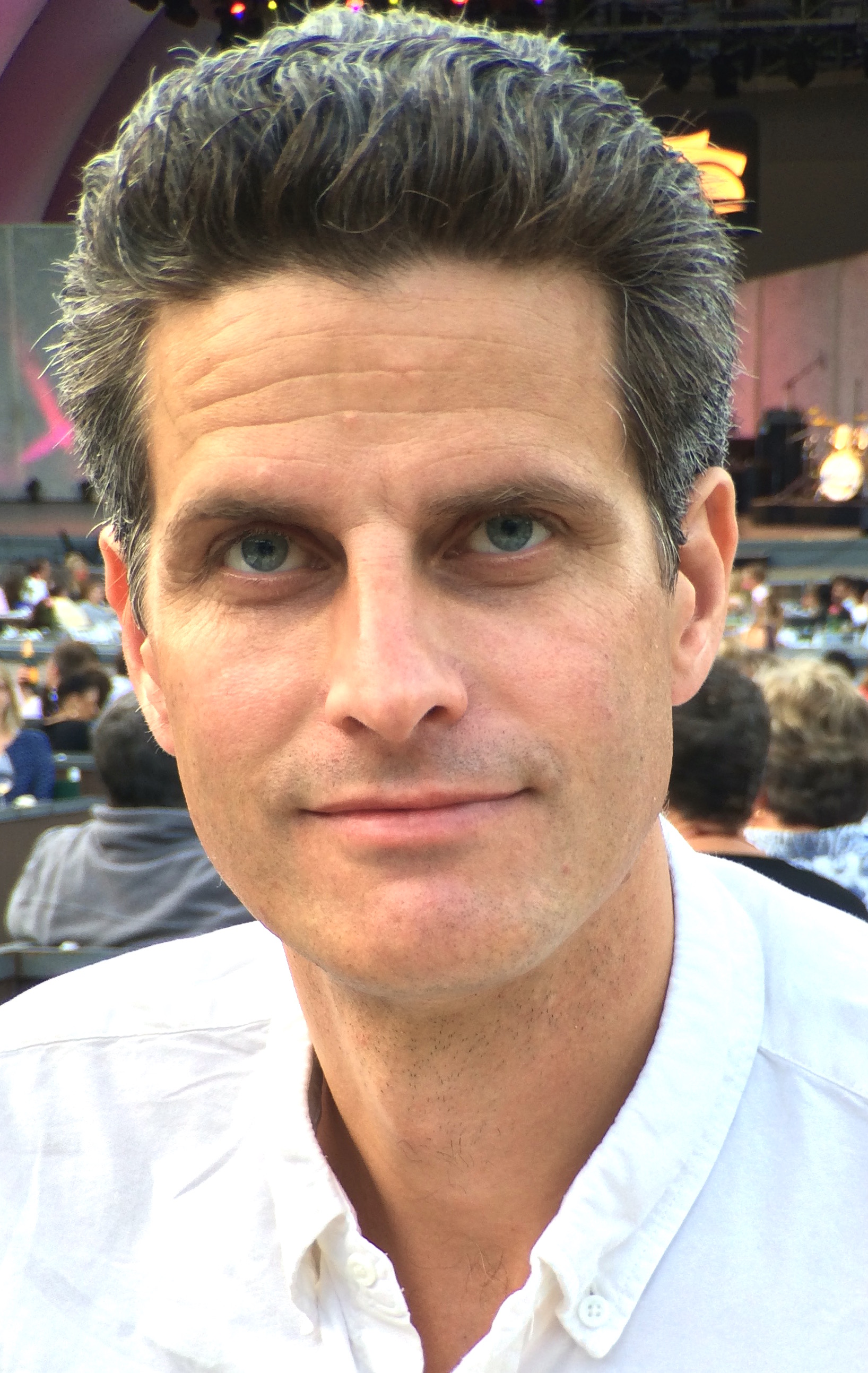
- John MacInnes at The Hollywood Bowl, June 2014
- Born: January 12, 1969 (age 57); Syracuse, New York, United States
- Occupation: Screenwriter
- Years active: 1999–present
- Spouse: Cynthia Cruz-MacInnes (m. 2010)
- Children: 1

John MacInnes is an Anglo-American screenwriter and director, noted for writing the script of the video game Call of Duty: Advanced Warfare.

== Early life ==
John was born in Syracuse, New York in 1969, moving with his mother Tina MacInnes to the United Kingdom in 1972. During the 1980s, John was well known as a top freestyle BMX rider, and was featured on the front cover of the magazine BMX Biker issue 11. In 1992 he graduated from Goldsmiths, University of London with an Honours Degree in Communications Studies and Sociology.

== Career ==
John's career in the film industry began in 1986 as projectionist at the Rex Cinema in Wareham, Dorset. Soon after he began working in casting, establishing a mobile video business, specializing in screen-tests. During that time he worked with directors including Sydney Pollack, Miloš Forman, Tim Burton, John Schlesinger and Alan Parker.

In 2001 John wrote and directed the short film Chopsticks, starring Ron Moody. The film was a finalist in the 2002 Turner Classic Movies short film competition.

In 2003, the UK Film Council and the David Lean Foundation awarded John a scholarship to complete his Master's degree in scriptwriting at UCLA, after which he moved permanently to Los Angeles in 2004.

In 2011, John won the Nicholl Fellowship in Screenwriting for the action/thriller script Outside the Wire.

In 2012, John was employed by Activision to write the script of the 2014 first-person shooter video game Call of Duty: Advanced Warfare for Sledgehammer Games. It became the top-selling video game of 2014.

== Personal life ==
John currently lives in Los Angeles with his wife Cynthia Cruz-MacInnes and son Sebastian.

== Honors and awards ==
- Nicholl Fellowship in Screenwriting 2011
