= Radha Bharadwaj =

Indian film director

- Born: India
- Occupation(s): Film director, film producer, screenwriter
- Years active: 1991–present

Radha Bharadwaj is an Indian-born American filmmaker, film producer and screenwriter based in Los Angeles.

== Early life ==
She moved to the United States in her late teens to study film.

== Career ==
Bharadwaj's screenwriting and directing feature debut is Closet Land. The surreal psychological drama was released by Universal Pictures in 1991, making Radha Bharadwaj the first director of Indian descent to have a film released by a major Hollywood studio. Closet Land stars Alan Rickman and Madeleine Stowe. Ron Howard and Brian Grazer produced the feature. The screenplay for Closet Land won the Nicholl Screenwriting Fellowship sponsored by the Academy of Motion Picture Arts and Sciences, among others.

Bharadwaj's second feature was the 1998 Victorian gothic mystery, Basil. The period thriller, set in the United Kingdom, stars Derek Jacobi, Christian Slater, Jared Leto and Claire Forlani. The director's cut for Basil was twice selected to be the closing night film for the Special Presentation series at the Toronto International Film Festival, and chosen for a prime slot at the Los Angeles Film Festival. The film was also acclaimed at the American Film Market. Bharadwaj is currently working on new projects.

== Filmography ==
Year	Title	Director	Writer	Producer	Editor
1991	Closet Land	Yes	Yes	No	No
1998	Basil	Yes	Yes	Yes	No
2019	Space MOMs	Yes	Yes	Yes	Yes
