= Closet Land =

1991 film by Radha Bharadwaj

- Theatrical release poster
- Directed by: Radha Bharadwaj
- Written by: Radha Bharadwaj
- Produced by: Janet Meyers
- Starring: Madeleine Stowe; Alan Rickman
- Cinematography: Bill Pope
- Edited by: Lisa Zeno Churgin
- Music by: Richard Einhorn
- Production company: Imagine Entertainment
- Distributed by: Universal Pictures
- Release dates: March 6, 1991 (U.S.); September 10, 1991 (Toronto Festival of Festivals); April 2, 1993 (Japan); June 1, 1994 (France); February 25, 1999 (Argentina); January 2, 2000 (U.S. TV premiere)
- Running time: 89 minutes
- Country: United States
- Language: English
- Budget: $4 million
- Box office: $259,012

Closet Land is a 1991 independent film written and directed by Radha Bharadwaj. The film stars Madeleine Stowe as a young author of children's books and Alan Rickman as a sadistic secret policeman who is interrogating her. The film was released to mixed reviews.

== Plot ==
Set in an unspecified country, a woman is taken from her home in the middle of the night, accused of embedding dissident messages into her book Closet Land. The book is a story about a child who, as a result of bad behavior, has been locked in a closet as punishment. While in there, the child is greeted by a group of childhood ally archetypes who innocently attempt to comfort the scared little girl. The seemingly simple content is questioned by the government, which accuses the author of encouraging and introducing disloyalty among its audience of naïve children.

The interrogator is obstinate in his belief that the author is guilty of hidden propaganda. It is revealed that the novel was actually created as a form of escapism, providing a coping mechanism for the author, who endured sexual abuse as a child. Near the end of the film, the interrogator claims that he was the man who had sexually abused the author in her childhood. But one cannot be entirely sure he is telling the truth, as the film suggests he was just using the abuse against her as a way of breaking her down.

After subjecting her to lengthy physical and mental torture, and pretending to be several other people (another prisoner, a more brutal interrogator) while the victim is blindfolded and handcuffed, the interrogator tries to get her to sign a confession—to save her life. While he knows now that she is innocent, he implores her to confess to avoid execution. She refuses, and goes to her death.

== Cast ==
- Madeleine Stowe as Victim, a young author of children's books and also interrogated by a sadistic secret policeman.
- Alan Rickman as Interrogator, a ruthless interrogator.

== Production ==
The script was Radha Bharadwaj's winning submission to The Nicholl Fellowships in Screenwriting program in 1989. The Nicholl Fellowships are run by the Academy of Motion Picture Arts and Sciences. Bharadwaj later stated:

That same year, the screenplay was selected to participate in the prestigious Sundance Screenwriting Lab. At Sundance, I met director Alan Rudolph, who encouraged me enormously, pushing me to not compromise or give up in my fight to make my film on my own terms. I put in a cold call to director Oliver Stone's office. To my amazement, he not only read the script himself but also called me in for a meeting. He became a powerful supporter of my work. On the strength of his generous recommendations, I started to pass the screenplay to talent agents. Very soon, I was meeting with actors and actresses who were interested in playing the roles. The very same Hollywood that was once out-of-reach soon came a-calling. I took far too many meetings to count, with producers and financiers who wanted the script but wanted me out of the way as director—they wanted someone famous directing my script. Ron Howard and Brian Grazer's Imagine Entertainment gave me what I wanted: myself as director, with full creative control. I did my film with Imagine Entertainment, and remain grateful to Ron Howard and Brian Grazer for their faith in me and their support of me.

Bharadwaj said that this film was an outgrowth of her graduate studies at Temple University (PA), that she charmed her Hollywood producers into giving her money to do the film, and that they dropped it upon release.

Stowe and Rickman are the only cast of the film and they are both credited. Bharadwaj later revealed in a September 2005 production note that Rickman was not her original choice for the Interrogator. "If I were to pick my top choices for role of the interrogator in Closet Land," she wrote,

I would still unhesitatingly go with my first choices then: Sir Anthony Hopkins, Sir Ian Holm and Peter O'Toole. All three can capture not only the interrogator's violence and villainy—which is the easy part—but, more critically, his humanity. Evil does not come wearing horns and a tail, nor does it announce itself with flamboyant bombast and grandiose posturing. All too often, evil comes in a deceptively human package—it is quiet and inscrutable, complete with a tenderness and warmth that seem real. The seeming genuineness is our trap—this is why we repeatedly are snared by evil, why its pull is so strong. The three actors I just mentioned have the ability to capture true villainy, in all its all-too frail and human wrappings.

Once the film had two thespian actors attached, the film was green-lit and with a budget of two and a half million dollars, it was shot for eighteen days in Culver City, western Los Angeles.

It is left up to the viewer as to whether Stowe's character has in fact run afoul of the Government — or, alternatively, that the Interrogator is acting alone. The film exhibits the use of brutal and inhumane torture to coerce confessions from innocent victims. Due to the film's universal message, the human rights organization Amnesty International served as consultants for the film. Bharadwaj later said of their support:

I was, and remain opposed, to the Amnesty International quotes and commercials that tag my film in both its theatrical and video release. This is despite the fact that I personally support human rights organizations. But the Amnesty International quotes and commercials made it easy for those who did not understand my film to dismiss it as mere human rights propaganda. And those who did understand my film were irritated and disappointed by the quotes, wondering why a film that ultimately has such far-reaching scope needed to limit itself to an organization and its message. When plastered on a film, these quotes and commercials ended up subjugating the voice of the artist to the voice of a cause. Ironically, isn't that what Closet Land is about? The voice of a lone individual pitted against a cause?

== Release ==
The film premiered at numerous film festivals, including the Toronto International Film Festival, San Sebastian International Film Festival, the Women in Film Festival and the Stockholm International Film Festival. While Universal released the film theatrically (in limited cinemas) on March 6, 1991, the film was released on videocassette six months later by Media Home Entertainment, distributed by Fox Video. In 1993, Video Treasures released an EP-Mode recorded tape of the film. A DVD has been released in Europe.

== Reception ==
The film generated mixed reviews from critics. Review aggregator Rotten Tomatoes gives the film a 44% rating based on reviews from 9 critics, with an average score of 4.61/10. Despite the mixed reactions, the performances of the cast has been generally praised.

Variety was generally favourable, calling it an "imaginatively produced" film and "a harrowing, focused two-character piece." Singling out Rickman's performance, they said of his character: "[He] is no ordinary brute but a complex, highly civilized man who displays a range of emotions and talents, including the ability to voice-act other people to confuse his blindfolded victim." They added that "Rickman deserves a great deal of notice for his powerfully controlled, multifaceted performance." On the other hand, they received Stowe's delivery less favourably, saying: "Stowe displays some flash and backbone, but not enough to make this a truly engaging match."

Roger Ebert of the Chicago Sun-Times gave the film one and a half stars out of four, saying: "All it requires to make Closet Land complete is a pious screen note at the end of this story, assuring us that the torture of political prisoners continues all over our world today. The movie does not disappoint: The slogan appears right on schedule." He added: "What are the makers of films like this hoping for? Their movies are never seen by the torturers, and bring no fresh news for the good of heart, who are already well aware of the corrupted world we inhabit. The movie seems intended for the already converted, as an exercise in self-congratulation ... I am of course opposed to torture, but I preserve sufficient irony to be offended by the smugness of this film." He criticised the directing, noting that "there is a temptation to praise films like this because of their noble sentiments, without asking whether the work is good filmmaking. It is possible to be against political torture and still dislike this film? I think it is." He concluded: "The film would have been truer to itself and the real world if at the end the man had simply executed her."

Janet Maslin of The New York Times was mixed. She said of the directing and writing: "Miss Bharadwaj, whose film also calls to mind avant-garde department store windows and Calvin Klein's television ads, sets forth her story with no acknowledgement that it is so excruciating, obvious or small. The result is something much more remarkable for its overconfidence than in any other regard." She pointed out that while the writing is poor, the acting talent outshines it, praising the performances: "The two actors in this claustrophobic debacle are somewhat better than their material." She complimented the mise en scene created by Eiko Ishioka, calling the sets and costumes "welcome distractions."

Peter Travers of Rolling Stone awarded the film zero stars out of four and said that Madeleine Stowe and Alan Rickman "are fine, forceful actors, but they can't convince us that we're seeing more than a sermon wrapped in a film of stupefying artifice. By talking at us instead of to us, Closet Land locks us out."

Owen Gleiberman of Entertainment Weekly was unimpressed with the film, saying:

The minutes crawl by during this fancifully abstract two-character piece ... The movie, which has the feel of some didactic Off Off Broadway production left over from 1972, is set entirely in one gray marble room — a kind of stylized Bauhaus torture chamber. The moral scheme is, to put it mildly, basic: Closet Land is squarely on the side of innocent women who write children's books and squarely against the vile fascist monsters who torture them.

Kevin Thomas of the Los Angeles Times was the most negative, calling the film a "porno chic." He said: "It is impossible to imagine how Radha Bharadwaj's Closet Land is going to do much good for the cause of human rights in general, and the oppression of women in particular. Surely, anyone with the slightest degree of awareness of what's going on in the world knows of the horrible plight of political prisoners subjected to unspeakable torture. Consequently, why should anyone subject himself or herself to this pretentious and contrived two-person drama, which punishes the audience rather than enlightens it?" He criticised the lack of a proper setting for the film, an unnamed police state, saying: "Right off, the filmmaker lets us off the hook, making it easy to reject the incessant cruelty we witness as artificial." Confused about the film's lack of focus on a single theme, he added: "In any event, this bit of Freudianism put in the service of protesting child abuse overloads and sidetracks the film from its main purpose of protesting all human rights violations." He finally concluded by praising Madeleine Stowe's performance, noting that she "is actually quite moving in her unshakable dignity." On the other hand, he was more critical of Alan Rickman's delivery, noting that "Rickman, whose diction often seems muddled, is needlessly, hissably arch."

Radha Bharadwaj responded to some of the criticism in her own review, particularly to Kevin Thomas, titled "The Real Message of 'Closet Land,'" explaining that it "doesn't attempt to literally depict the physical reality of political interrogation. I'm more intrigued by the psychological experience: the disorientation, the absurdity, the terror. That's why Closet Land unfolds in a Kafka-esque environment grounded more in nightmare logic than gritty reality. A number of torture victims have told me that Closet Land truly captures the psychological reality of their experience. Amnesty International has strongly supported the film. If Closet Land had been 'pretentious,' the former victims who so strongly identify with the film would have been able to smell it a mile away. And they would certainly never have responded to a movie that degraded their harrowing life experience to the level of 'porno chic.'" She added:

I am not, as [Thomas'] simplistic analysis would have it, trying to mix a 'protest' of child abuse with a 'protest' of political abuse ... all forms of aggression are organically linked. Most who have grown up in the sheltered West have no direct experience with the pathology of political abuse and consider it alien. By likening political abuse to something more accessible to Westerners, child abuse, I can give people a better feel for the paternalistic power dynamics of political abuse.

Defending the ambiguous police state setting, she concluded:

Thomas would no doubt have me set the film in El Salvador or some other politically correct target so that Western viewers could all sneer at how rotten things are in the Third World. It's probably because Closet Land isn't safely placed in someone else's territory that the film leaves no one off the hook. The logic of Thomas' review is consistently baffling. He makes the preposterous assertion that there's no need for anyone to see Closet Land because anyone who's aware of world events knows that political prisoners are subject to torture. But, by the same token, anyone who reads the newspaper knows that racism, drug abuse, poverty and other ills plague our society. So why depict the harrowing aspects of any social problem on film? Why don't we all just make romantic comedies?

Kathleen Murphy of Film Comment further responded to the critical reception, explaining that the film "has suffered the kind of skin-deep read so prevalent among film reviewers driven primarily by deadlines and the contemporary demand for hip distanciation [sic]." Entertainment Weekly's box [office] score of critical grades for Bharadwaj's smart, passionate directorial debut averaged out at a D, lower even than that earned by the brain-dead thriller Sleeping with the Enemy" and that "though presented by Ron Howard's Imagine company and distributed by Universal - [the film] swiftly sank into last-week's-movie limbo. That's our loss." Her opinion of the film was overall overwhelmingly positive, dubbing it a "complex metaphor to political specificity," an "Alice in Closetland" that "had to be pulled out of its author's head into the Real World for validation." Analysing the film's themes, she said that "the film works most potently as a woman's redemptive fantasy, a harrowing Alice in Wonderland descent into the darkness behind the brain to discover 'the soul's true face.'" Critiquing the political and sexually abusive overtones, she noted that Stowe's character is "denuded of even a name, depersonalized into a number. Such erasure - of self and sexuality - is the legacy of child molestation; but it also suggests the powerfully seductive buildups and letdowns that dominate contemporary media images of women." Praising the characterisations and performances, she likened Stowe's character to Kafka's Josef K. and said of Rickman's character, drawing comparisons to Big Brother: "Out of her imagination's rich store, Stowe has created a man of many parts, an actor who will play both satan and saviour to her sinner. Rickman receives her as the 'officer-in-charge', but he wears many masks - Grand Inquisitor, fellow victim, father, lover, therapist, the rapist - before he baptizes Stowe into authentic selfhood." She further praised the production design by Ishioka and elaborated on the final scene, saying: "After Stowe's last blindfold is removed, she incandesces in her own enlightenment. Emerging, through a kind of birth canal, from her uterine hell, she simply leaves Rickman, now a superfluous projection, behind."

Alan Rickman later commented on the mixed reception in an interview when journalist Diane Solway brought up the poor reception, as she called it "a chilling two-character film" that is "reminiscent of Kafka's The Trial but not nearly so effective." Responding to this, he noted that the final cut of the film might have been too harsh: "When we were making the film, I thought, 'This could be too relentless.' I mean, there wasn't a single joke in it."

Frederic and Mary Ann Brussat commented on the film's themes, noting: "Radha Bharadwaj not only plumbs the totalitarian mind but also the roles of abuser and victim — powerful male and oppressed woman."

TV Guide was more positive and gave the film three out of four stars, saying:

Despite Alan Rickman's bravura performance, Closet Land...is an overly theatrical analysis of police state repression ... Despite a splendid performance by Rickman, who can be intellectually cool, diffident or cruel, [the film] suffers from far too much artistic atmosphere ... The writer, as portrayed by Madeline Stowe, may be a trifle too heroic, especially since all the factual writings about police-state methods since Arthur Koestler and George Orwell emphasize that, given unlimited time and methods, nobody can last. It is the interrogator who emerges as the more interesting of the pair, particularly with the hints of his past. The basic analogy about child molestation seems strained; the scant difference in their years suggests that it is not the same man. Still, Closet Land does have a certain fascination as a piece of theater and an intellectual exercise on a pressing political issue.

Bob Mielke, Ph.D, Professor of English at Truman State University, wrote positively of the film in 2014 in an online analytical essay, calling it "a subgenre of the German Kammerspiel or 'chamber-drama' film," saying:

And one of the most powerful visual sleights of hand in Closet Land itself is when, to torturer Alan Rickman's voice-over, we see shots of "innocent" children reconfigured with the uncropped image to show a child greeting Hitler, one at a Ku Klux Klan rally and a young gun-toting terrorist. By sheer serendipity, my initial encounter with Bharadwaj's work illustrates one of her major thematic interests: things aren't always what they seem to be.

Commenting on the mixed reception the film initially received, he explained:

The independent approach to American filmmaking had not quite reached the level of acceptability it got later in the decade. The film was too minimal for some tastes; its plot blended elements of the fantastic, allegory and amazing plot coincidences with its overall grim realism. It was a hard film to "place" generically ... But the film has a curious staying power as well. It is utterly memorable, as so few films are. The intensity of the acting and the sharp writing in the script ensures that one viewing of the film will roll around in the mind for decades to come. Lively internet chat demonstrates the film is still much discussed.

Bharadwaj stated in 2005 on her website:

It has provided me quiet satisfaction that my small film, which, at the time of its release, was so misunderstood by even some well-meaning critics and people who pride themselves on being connoisseurs of the medium, has endured steadily—purely by word-of-mouth. One viewer seeing it and recommending it to his/her friends. Democracy in action. Not a week goes by without my receiving letters from people from all over the world who have just seen the film, and who are moved by its power and its intensity. Everyone out there working hard to do something original, something new, something bold and innovative, should take heart from the story of my film: good work will endure, no matter what the odds. No matter.

She added in 2009 on a public blog:

If the film has currency today, it is because of viewers like you. You have kept my film alive. You had the ingenuity to put it up on YouTube. You have engaged in chats and discussions about it. So the fact that the film is alive, and its influence is growing, is very much a testimony to what you can do.

Rickman once again mentioned the film briefly in an April 2015 interview with Empire magazine when discussing his early career, noting the lack of an audience the film had:

Somewhere in there I made—and have continued to do—films that disappear without a trace. You still care about them. So there's the public agenda and there's the private one. And the private one is certainly more important in a way because that's what my life is made up of. So while I was doing that [bigger budget films], I'd also done Closet Land, which I should think almost nobody saw.

== Stage adaptations ==
Bharadwaj has since licensed the rights for stage performances of her original script. Bharadwaj stated:

I undertook to adapt my screenplay to stage when I started to receive offers from stage groups all over the world, who had seen my film and were moved by it, and who wanted to perform it on stage. The play version has now been performed almost everywhere in the world. On stage, the words have a lyrical force and sway. The film experience is, however, vastly different: hugely emotional and personal, with her pain and his madness intimately felt; a dream world where imagination is king.

== Influence on other work ==
It has been noted that the 2003 Irish play The Pillowman written and directed by Martin McDonagh borrowed heavily from this film. Commenting on this, Mielke has stated that "plot elements of Closet Land persist in another narrative host body, another way in which this text persists and haunts (if you will) our culture."

== See also ==
- Prisoner of conscience
- The Pillowman
