= Dennis Clontz =

American journalist

Dennis Clontz (April 10, 1951 – June 14, 2004) was an American playwright, journalist, and screenwriter. He was one of the inaugural recipients of the Nicholl Fellowships in Screenwriting in 1986. Clontz was part of a team of Los Angeles Times journalists awarded a 1995 Pulitzer Prize for Breaking News Reporting on the 1994 Northridge earthquake.

Clontz earned a Master of Fine Arts degree from University of California, Los Angeles. Plays by Clontz include Generations, Night Breath, Interfusions, Fire/Photograph, American Play, and A Match Made in Heaven.

Clontz died of lung cancer at which time he lived in Glendale, California. His heirs have announced planned publication of a posthumous collection of his plays and poems.
