= Silent protagonist =

Player character without dialogue

In video games, a silent protagonist is a player character who lacks any dialogue for the entire duration of a game, with the possible exception of occasional interjections or short phrases. In some games, especially visual novels, this may extend to protagonists who have dialogue, but no voice acting like all other non-player characters. A silent protagonist may be employed to lend a sense of mystery or uncertainty of identity to the gameplay, or to help the player identify better with them. Silent protagonists may also be anonymous. Not all silent protagonists are necessarily mute or do not speak to other characters; they may simply not produce any dialogue audible to the player.

== Origin ==
The earliest player characters in video games of the 1980s, including the likes of Mario, Metroid's Samus, and The Legend of Zelda's Link, were silent protagonists. Characters such as these may occasionally speak through text or audible words, but are otherwise limited to making gestures, inarticulate noises, or remaining entirely silent.

The same was true for early role-playing games. These games originated from pen and paper games such as Dungeons & Dragons and when put on the screen, did not require any spoken dialogue, since the games' plot and mechanics were all picture and motion based. Players are expected to put themselves into the role of the silent hero, and since the player does not talk in the game, neither does their on-screen avatar.

== Uses ==
Many early video games made use of a silent protagonist out of utility, which could be due to technology, time, or budget limitations, or as a narrative device. Whether the player is supposed to be the protagonist or is merely assuming control of an established character and whether the game allows the player freedom of choices that would be difficult to believably justify with spoken narrative influence this decision. Some have cited the 1993 game Myst as an example of a first person adventure where the main character is merely an avatar for the player's choices and dialogue would not be needed or helpful. The 2001 game Grand Theft Auto III has no dialogue for its protagonist, Claude, as is common for games of its time, and this allows players of many backgrounds and personalities to identify with the character they control in the game's open world environment.

In the Half-Life series, the protagonist is the silent Gordon Freeman, but is distinct from the player. Game writer Marc Laidlaw, who worked on Half-Life and Portal (which also features a silent protagonist) with game developer Valve, stated that he did not recommend keeping protagonists silent due to the difficulties that arise during development, but noted that limiting oneself to a silent protagonist can lead to more creativity.

== Critical response ==
Reception has varied widely according to its use, ranging from praise for its help immersing a player in the game, with titles such as Half-Life 2 and franchises such as Mario and The Legend of Zelda frequently cited, while the protagonist's lack of communication has at times been noted as hindersome to plot development, as in one reviewer's comments on Grand Theft Auto III, or multiple accounts on the Crash Bandicoot franchise. Others have stated that real immersion in a game would require a character to speak, since in such situations, the player would naturally vocalize and the protagonist does not.

CJ Miozzi of The Escapist called franchises that still use the technique a "crutch" for bad storytelling, saying "just as narration has become a hallmark of terrible movies through improper use, silent protagonists have become the trademarks of a weak storyline in a game."
