= Firefox (disambiguation) =

Firefox is a web browser.

Firefox or fire fox may also refer to:

- Firefox (mythology), a creature in Finnish folklore
- Firefox (novel), a 1977 novel by Craig Thomas
  - Firefox (film), a 1982 American film based on the novel
  - Firefox (video game), an arcade game based on the film
  - Mikoyan MiG-31, a fictional aircraft from the novel
- Firefox OS, an operating system for tablets and phones
- Eurofly Fire Fox, an Italian aircraft design
- Red panda or fire fox, a Himalayan tree mammal
- F15 Firefox, a scooter by Malaguti
- Firefox bikes, a bicycle brand of Hero Cycles
- Fire Fox, a move used by Fox McCloud in Super Smash Bros.

== See also ==
- Firefox Down, a sequel novel by Craig Thomas
- Foxfire (disambiguation)
- Foxes in popular culture
- Fox spirit
- Kitsune
- Kumiho
- Nine-tailed fox
