= Mitchell Gant =

Fictional character created by author Craig Thomas

- Clint Eastwood as Mitchell Gant in Firefox
- First appearance: Firefox (novel) (1977)
- Created by: Craig Thomas
- Portrayed by: Clint Eastwood (1982)

In-universe information
- Occupation: U.S. Air Force pilot, CIA agent, NTSB member
- Origin: Clarkville, United States
- Nationality: American

Mitchell Gant is a fictional character in a series of novels authored by Craig Thomas. His first appearance occurs in the 1977 novel Firefox, as a U.S. Air Force major sent to hijack a prototype Soviet MiG-31 Firefox fighter jet. In 1982, Clint Eastwood portrayed the character in the novel's film adaptation. Gant also appears in the Thomas novels Firefox Down, Winter Hawk, and A Different War. The Eastwood movie marked the character's only screen appearance, as "a prospective Firefox film franchise fizzled."

== Character biography ==
Gant grew up in Clarkville, a small town in mid-western America. He finds himself drawn to flight when, as a child, he sees a small airplane land at a local gas station in need of fuel. With few happy memories of Clarkville, Gant finds his way into the United States Air Force, becoming a fighter pilot.

While flying combat during the Vietnam War, Gant's F-4 Phantom II is shot down by a surface-to-air missile. Gant ejects and is immediately captured, apparently by guerrillas. The arrival of allied aircraft saves Gant, but also traumatizes him—napalm dropped by one of the aircraft incinerates a young girl traveling with the enemy soldiers. The experience leaves him with post-traumatic stress disorder, causing him to have frequent flashbacks. He suffers from a recurring nightmare about himself being a Vietnamese and burning in napalm dropped by U.S. aircraft.

After the war, he leaves the military and is recruited by the CIA; for some time, he works a menial job in a Los Angeles pizza restaurant while shadowing a KGB cell. Later, he becomes a handyman, a drunk, and a hobo. Eventually he is re-recruited by the CIA for their Firefox operation, supposedly because of his knowledge of Russian, his combat experience in Vietnam, and his knowledge of flying Russian aircraft. His familiarity with the Russian language comes from his mother, who was Russian. Because of his background, he only requires three months of training. Gant learns to fly a replica MiG-25 as well as a simulator of the Firefox.

== Novels ==
=== Firefox (1977) ===
In Firefox, an Anglo-American intelligence scheme inserts Gant into the Soviet Union in order for him to steal one of the two prototypes of a revolutionary fighter plane, the MiG-31, NATO code name "Firefox" (not to be confused with the real MiG-31, a development of the MiG-25). After crossing the Soviet Union from Moscow to the airbase where the Firefox is being developed, with the help of various MI6 agents and several false identities; dissident scientists involved in the project create a diversion allowing Gant to steal the plane. He then deals with several obstacles and, after dispatching the second prototype in a dogfight, has apparently succeeded in his theft.

=== Firefox Down (1983) ===
In Firefox Down, the immediate sequel to Firefox, Gant realizes that he has not survived his dogfight with the second MiG-31 unscathed. Leaking fuel from a punctured fuel tank, and forced to burn more when confronted by two MiG-25's, Gant lands the MiG-31 on a frozen lake in Finland very close to the Soviet border. The Soviets capture Gant, but not before the plane breaks through the ice and sinks. The Soviets attempt to use brainwashing to determine whether the MiG-31 crashed or landed. Gant escapes from the KGB and with the help of a Russian double agent named Anna Akhmerovna, the Soviet Union as well. Gant and Anna are reluctantly assisted by Dmitri Priabin, a KGB officer who helped coordinate the original hunt for Gant and the Firefox, but is also Anna's lover. Anna is shot as Gant crosses the border. Gant meets up with a team of western intelligence experts that have recovered the MiG-31 from under the Finnish ice, but have not been able to move it to safety. Gant successfully flies the plane home, even though immersion under water has damaged the plane's radar-invisibility.

=== Winter Hawk (1987) ===
Gant's next role was in the novel Winter Hawk. Originally, Gant's mission was to smuggle scientist and spy Filip Kedrov out of the Baikonur Cosmodrome in Kazakhstan, as Kedrov had information on a Soviet spaceborne directed-energy weapon. However, Gant and Kedrov were both captured by the KGB. Dmitri Priabin, the ranking head of the KGB, still holds a vendetta against Gant due to the death of Anna Akhmerovna. When he learns, however, of a plot by the Soviet military to take control of the Soviet space weapon and use it against an American Space Shuttle, Priabin is again forced to ally himself with Gant in order to warn his civilian superiors in Moscow. With the Soviet Army imposing a security crackdown on Baikonur, even upon the KGB, Gant and Priabin escape Baikonur in a KGB helicopter. Shot down by Soviet helicopters, Gant is forced to escape again with evidence of the Soviet weapon—first on foot, then in a stolen An-2 cropduster, then again on foot when the An-2 is shot down near the Turkish border. Eluding a manhunt by Soviet Paratroopers, Gant is extracted by U.S. Army helicopters.

=== A Different War (1997) ===
Gant's final appearance comes in the novel A Different War, in which he is a member of the National Transportation Safety Board. In this novel, he investigates the crashes of two examples of a fictional airliner, and discovers that they were both sabotaged by a former CIA agent working for a rival aircraft manufacturer. In the epilogue, it is mentioned that Gant was awarded a Medal of Honor following the events of the novel. It is also revealed that he was an F-117 Nighthawk pilot and instructor during the Persian Gulf War.
