= Foxfire (disambiguation) =

Foxfire is the glow from a forest fungus.

Foxfire may also refer to:

== Entertainment ==
- Foxfire (novel), a 1950 Western novel by Anya Seton
  - Foxfire (1955 film), an adaptation of Seton's novel, starring Jane Russell and Jeff Chandler
- Foxfire (comics), a fictional character from Marvel Comics' Squadron Supreme series
- Foxfire (magazine), and book series, associated with the Foxfire project, concerning Appalachian culture
  - Foxfire (play), 1982, based on the Foxfire project
    - Foxfire (1987 film), a TV movie starring John Denver, based on the 1982 play
- Code Name: Foxfire, 1985 American television series
- Foxfire: Confessions of a Girl Gang, a 1993 novel by Joyce Carol Oates
  - Foxfire (1996 film), based on the Oates novel
  - Foxfire: Confessions of a Girl Gang (2012 film), based on the same novel

== Other uses ==
- Foxfire, North Carolina, a small U.S. town
- Fox-fire (kitsunebi), glowing balls carried by kitsune (foxes) in Japanese folklore
- The Diavik Foxfire diamond, a 187.7 carat gem from the Diavik Diamond Mine
- Fox Fire, a Northern California wildfire that occurred in September 2020

== See also ==
- Firefox (disambiguation)
