= Rat Trap (novel) =

Book by Craig Thomas

- First UK edition
- Author: Craig Thomas
- Language: English
- Genre: Techno-thriller novel
- Publisher: Michael Joseph (UK) & Holt, Rinehart and Winston (USA)
- Publication place: United Kingdom
- Media type: Print (hardback & paperback)
- Pages: 261 pp (first edition, hardback)
- Followed by: Firefox

Rat Trap is a techno-thriller novel written by Craig Thomas and published in 1976. The plot concerns a hijacking at London's Heathrow International Airport and the complications that occur trying to resolve the situation.

== Plot summary ==
While on approach at London Heathrow Airport, a Boeing 707 begins experiencing engine trouble consistent with an engine fire. After a fraught landing, the plane is hijacked.

The contingency plans for a hijacking are mobilized at the Home Office. Hilary Latymer is the 'Ratcatcher' who will negotiate with the terrorists and attempt to outwit them. During negotiations, the hijackers, led by a man named Packer, demand a prisoner held by the UK, one Shafiq Nasoud. Nasoud is currently being held at HM Prison Dartmoor, charged with attempting to smuggle firearms through Heathrow. It is ordered that Nasoud be brought to London in case it becomes necessary to hand him over to the terrorists. While ferrying him from Devon in a small airplane, the plane experiences engine trouble and crash lands. Nasoud manages to escape his jailers.

Latymer's negotiations with the hijackers do not go well. He surmises from discussion with Packer that Packer is high on heroin. He also deduces from information provided by the American Federal Bureau of Investigation that a female hijacker, Joanne Fender, has a death wish and does not intend for the hijacking to be resolved non-violently. An attempt to take the plane ends in bloodshed.

For most of the evening and night, Nasoud is able to elude a massive manhunt. He kills one British soldier and steals his rifle, and later holds a family hostage. After many close scrapes and several shootouts with the military, who have strict orders to take him alive, Nasoud steals a jeep. He is identified shortly after evading a roadblock, and pursued to a small farm. There, a soldier disables his jeep by shooting the engine block, but he drives into a stone wall and is killed.

With Nasoud dead, Latymer has no options left. On the brink of paying a large bribe to the hijackers, he decides to pass off an imposter as Nasoud, simply to get the hostages released. In the course of the exchange, the imposter is found out, but not before the passengers disembark the plane safely. Gunfire is exchanged between hijackers and police, and meanwhile on the plane, Joanne Fender sets off a bomb, killing Packer and the flight crew, bringing an end to the incident.
