= Winter Hawk =

1987 novel by Craig Thomas

- First edition
- Author: Craig Thomas
- Cover artist: Mark Watts
- Language: English
- Genre: Techno-thriller novel
- Publisher: William Morrow & Company
- Publication place: United Kingdom
- Media type: Print (hardback & paperback)
- Pages: 605 pp (first edition, hardback)
- ISBN: 0-380-70389-0
- OCLC: 15055356
- Preceded by: The Bear's Tears
- Followed by: All the Grey Cats

Winter Hawk is a 1987 thriller novel written by Craig Thomas. It is a novel set within a larger continuum linking many of Thomas's other books, including some characters last seen in Firefox Down, itself a sequel to Thomas's Firefox. Though the featured character is Mitchell Gant, the plot is composed of several running subplots surrounding the imminent launch of the Soviets' Space Shuttle and the planned signing of an historic arms reduction treaty between the United States and the Soviet Union.

== Plot summary ==
The events of Winter Hawk transpire over a few days in which the Soviet Union will launch into Earth orbit the first in a series of space-based laser battle stations, the existence of which they have kept a closely guarded secret. The launch is meant to coincide with the signing of a new and apparently groundbreaking treaty dramatically reducing nuclear weapons to be kept by both sides, but excluding space weapons such as the one the Soviets will be launching, mostly because none are known to exist. The Americans know of the weapon because a Soviet technician named Philip Kedrov has been supplying them information, operating under the code-name "Cactus Plant". The Soviet space weapon places the Americans in a painful dilemma: they can neither sign a treaty that will dramatically cede the balance of power to the Soviet Union, nor can they back out of the treaty lacking proof of the Soviet weapon. The only alternative is a deep cover extraction mission of Kedrov and his evidence from the Soviet's space launch complex, the Baikonur Cosmodrome in the Kazakh Soviet Socialist Republic. The mission, involving two stolen Soviet Mil Mi-24 helicopters to be flown by CIA pilots—one of whom is CIA pilot Mitchell Gant—is codenamed "Winter Hawk".

The story, which then shifts to Baikonur, reveals competing agendas within the Soviet camp. The Soviet civilian leadership has allowed development of the laser weapon, whose launch is codenamed "Linchpin", to placate a military antagonized by military spending cuts. Unbeknownst to Soviet leaders, the Soviet military has its own plans for the weapon, including a live fire test, codenamed "Lightning", against the American Space Shuttle Atlantis. The novel suggests "Lightning" as a prelude to an army-backed coup to seize control over the Soviet Union, even as the laser weapon will make the Soviet Union the world's leading super power.

KGB Colonel Dmitri Priabin, introduced as a minor character in Firefox, elevated to a more central role in Firefox Down and now the ranking KGB officer in Baikonur, nurses a painful grudge against Mitchell Gant due to the tragic events of Firefox Down. Like the reader, Priabin quickly learns of the existence of "Lightning" but not the details. The military has kept its plans secret by arranging fatal "accidents" for any civilians they suspect have learned of "Lightning". He has also learned of Kedrov's treachery, and keeps him under surveillance.

Priabin investigates the murders as a pretext to learn details of "Lightning" itself, which he correctly concludes is an illegal military mission. He also surveils Kedrov, suspecting that the Americans will try extracting him before the launch of the laser weapon, although he has no way of knowing that the mission will be flown by Mitchell Gant.

Gant's mission proves ill-fated from the start. The C-5 cargo plane carrying the helicopters and their crew to their staging point, suffers a fuel-system malfunction requiring the jettisoning of the helicopters on a remote beach—nearly destroying both of them. The helicopters are made flight-ready and the mission commences, only for one of the helicopters to be shot down over Soviet-occupied Afghanistan. Gant narrowly avoids destruction over Afghanistan only to be captured once he reaches Baikonur and tries to extract Kedrov, falling into the hands of KGB officers who had been surveilling the turncoat engineer.

Barely keeping himself from killing Gant, Priabin instead takes him into custody, then continues his investigation into "Lightning". Priabin soon learns the truth, but he is unable to warn Moscow because an Army-imposed, pre-launch security lockdown has cut Baikonur off from the rest of the world. Realizing that the army will soon eliminate him as it has other obstacles, Priabin is forced to save Gant in order for the American to fly them both out of Baikonur along with evidence of "Lightning". Using the KGB's Mil Mi-2 helicopter, the two of them manage to get evidence of the laser weapon, but not before their helicopter is severely damaged by fire from a group of the army's Mil Mi-24 helicopters. Gant barely escapes the Army patrols before he crash lands outside of Baikonur.

With evidence of the weapon, Gant escapes on foot. Priabin, weighing his hatred for Gant against the implications for "Lightning", chooses to be captured by the army. Gant steals an Antonov An-2 biplane used for crop dusting at a nearby collective farm. He narrowly escapes army helicopters sent to capture him, but not before the Soviets have successfully launched their shuttle carrying the laser weapon.

General Rodin, the army's ranking officer, decides against immediately killing Priabin. It was Rodin's son who revealed to Priabin the details of "Lightning" before being killed by subordinate officers acting against the general's orders. Led to believe that the KGB drove his son to suicide, but suspecting his other officers nonetheless, Rodin keeps Priabin in his own custody, even as he orders a massive hunt for Gant. Emotionally unhinged by his son's death, and his wife's suicide immediately following it, Rodin is unable to keep Priabin from escaping before the laser weapon has been successfully placed in orbit.

With the help of Kedrov, Priabin finds the covert tracking station the army will use to control the laser satellite, and sabotages its orbital uplink.

With his plane shot down by Soviet fighters near the Turkish border, Gant is forced to make the journey on foot while being chased by Soviet troops. Having sent his special code over the air before bailing out, Gant's presence is now known to the Americans as well, who send their own helicopters across the border to save him.

The novel closes with the signing of the new arms reduction treaty, which the Soviets have graciously amended to include space-based weapons.

== Characters ==
- Major Mitchell Gant – American fighter pilot and spy; protagonist
- President John Calvin – President of the United States who orders the CIA to undertake Winter Hawk despite having no confidence in its prospects for success.
- Lt. General Pyotr Rodin – officer of the Soviets' Strategic Rocket Forces, and the highest-ranking officer in Baikonur. He is also in charge of "Lightning", though it is also clear that he is working under the orders of superiors in Moscow.
- Colonel Dmitri Priabin – the head of KGB in Baikonur
- Filip Kedrov – Soviet technician in Baikonur, secretly working for the Americans
- Colonel Gennadi Serov – Gen. Rodin's immediate subordinate and chief enforcer in Baikonur. He is responsible for eliminating security threats to "Lightning", a group which will include Rodin's son. He is ruthless in carrying out General Rodin's orders, and even more so when going beyond them.
- Lt. Valery Rodin – General Rodin's son, an officer in the Strategic Rocket Forces. Though low-ranking, he knows of "Lightning".

== Allusions/references ==
=== From other works ===
Winter Hawk makes allusions to other Craig Thomas novels, mostly Firefox and Firefox Down which introduces the characters of Mitchell Gant and Priabin, and develops the basis for Priabin's vendetta against the American. Thomas' recurring British characters — Kenneth Aubrey, Peter Shelley, Patrick Hyde, Giles Pyott — do not appear in the story. Unlike the joint Anglo-American intelligence operation in Firefox, the mission of this story is almost purely American.

=== To actual history ===
Winter Hawk appears to be set in the mid-1980s. Early on, the events of Firefox are mentioned as having occurred only 18 months previously. Because those events include Yuri Andropov as KGB director, the setting would be no later than mid-1984, or about 18 months after Andropov ascended to post of Soviet General Secretary. This would be consistent with existence of the American Space Shuttle and the presence of Soviet forces in Afghanistan. The efforts by Nikitin, the fictitious Soviet leader during the events of Winter Hawk, to cut military spending while engaging the Americans in arms-reduction accords suggest that character as having been patterned on Mikhail Gorbachev, who ascended to Soviet leadership in 1985. That was also the year of the first flight of the Space Shuttle Atlantis.

The timing becomes problematic given mention of an earlier stolen Mil-24, whose crew are said to have defected from Afghanistan in 1985, and also the existence of the Soviet orbiter. It appears that the Soviet orbiter of the story, here called Raketoplan, has been in use for some time. Historically, the Soviet shuttle/orbiter did not fly until 1988, and that was for a single, unmanned flight. A Soviet Orbital weapons platform did exist, at least in prototype form. In May 1987, the Soviets attempted to launch Polyus, an orbital platform to be equipped with a megawatt Carbon dioxide laser. The launch, using the Energia heavy launch rocket, ended in failure and Polyus instead reentered Earth's atmosphere and burned up.

== Sequels ==
Mitchell Gant returns in the novel A Different War, published in 1997. Unlike previous books, the events of this story are separated by a much wider interval, as the setting is clearly post Cold War. Despite the secrecy of his Cold War missions, it is clear in that later story that Gant is publicly known.
