= Reverse bluescreen =

Visual effects technique

Flying scene from the 1982 film Firefox, in which the technique was first used.

Reverse bluescreen is a visual effects technique pioneered by Jonathan Erland for shooting the flying sequences in Clint Eastwood's 1982 film Firefox. Erland worked for John Dykstra's company, Apogee Inc., at the time he developed the technique. Its objective is to enable the matting of subjects that confound the conventional process, such as those exhibiting reflective surfaces. It derives its name from the fact that it reverses, or inverts or is the negative of, the basic bluescreen process.

In 1983, Jonathan Erland and Roger Dorney, for reverse bluescreen, received a Scientific and Engineering Award from the Academy of Motion Picture Arts and Sciences for this technique.

In 1985, Jonathan Erland, Donald Trumball, Stephen Fog, and Paul Burk received a Technical Achievement Award from the Academy of Motion Picture Arts and Sciences for the design and development of the "Blue Max" high-power, blue-flux projector for traveling matte composite photography.

In 1985, Jonathan Erland and Robert Bealmear received a Technical Achievement Award from the Academy of Motion Picture Arts and Sciences for an innovative design for front projection screens and an improved method for their construction.

== Technique ==
The patented technique is a variant of the traditional bluescreen traveling matte process for composite photography. The basic bluescreen process calls for filming a subject in front of the solid blue backing, which consists of a translucent blue plastic sheet in front of banks of fluorescent lights. This process poses a problem. A reflective surface on the subject being filmed would result in blue reflections visible to the camera. Since the compositing process entails converting blue in the image into some other background image, such reflections would result in holes in the foreground subject with the background scene showing through.

The reverse bluescreen process overcame this problem by coating the foreground subject with a clear fluorescent paint that was invisible under conventional visible light but fluoresced when illuminated by ultraviolet blacklight, thus inverting the process. The filmmakers shoot a subject, such as the glossy black jet fighter in the Warner motion picture Firefox, against a neutral (e.g., black) background lit with normal stage lights. Then, they reshoot exactly the same scene—using precise motion control photography—but with the normal stage lighting replaced with blacklight. The 360 nm UV light causes the fluorescent paint to glow, transforming the plane from black to a glowing object. From this image a male and female traveling matte could be produced that enabled the plane to be composited into any background scene desired.

"Composite Components Company holds the patent (#4,417,791) on the Reverse Bluescreen process for motion control photography"

Composite Components Company was founded by Jonathan and Kay Erland in 1995 after fifteen years at Apogee Productions.
