= List of fictional aircraft =

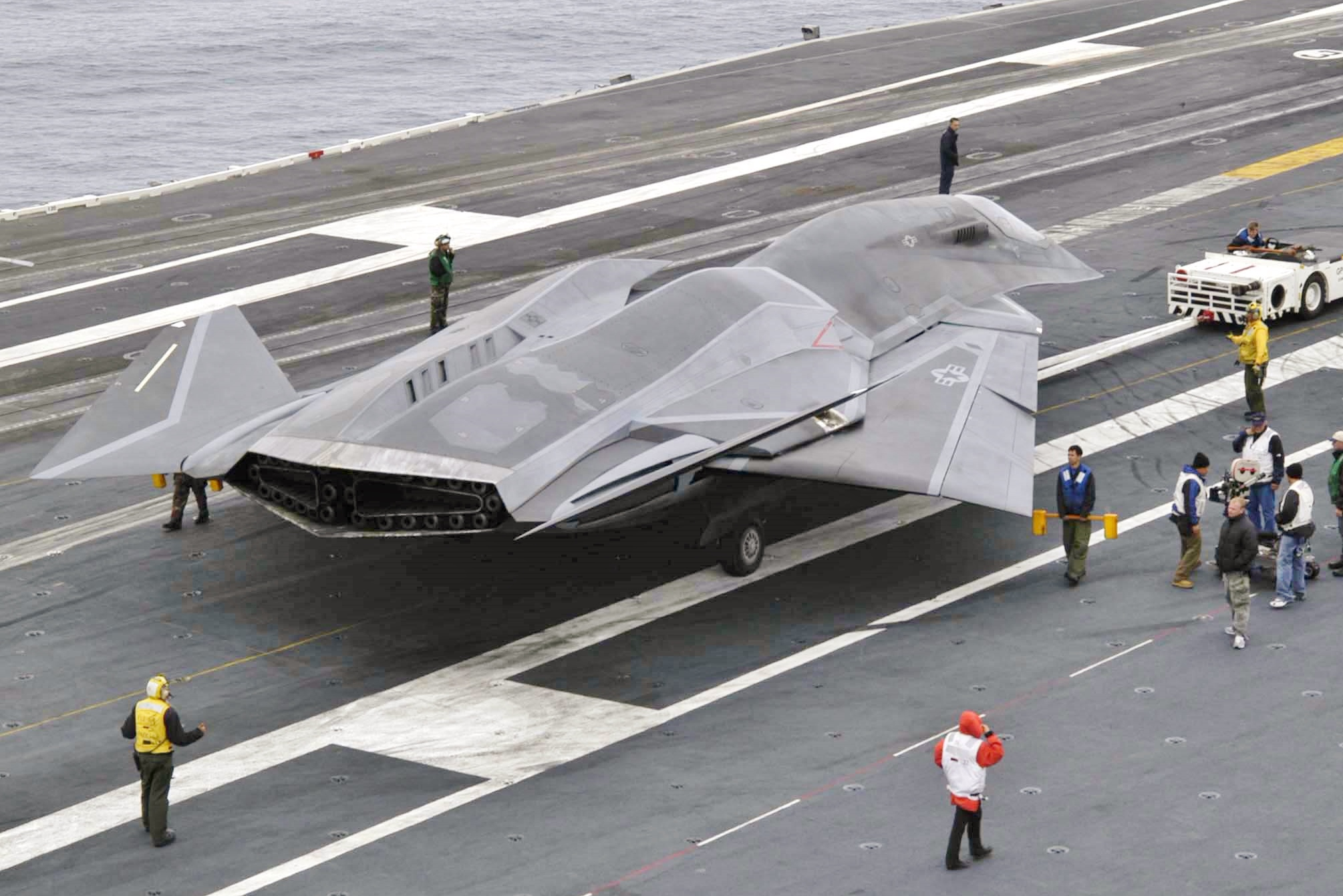
A F/A-37 Talon mockup on the flight deck of the USS Abraham Lincoln from the film Stealth

This is a list of fictional aircraft, including fixed-wing aircraft, rotary wing aircraft, and lighter-than-air craft. The aircraft in this list are generally intended to operate in an atmosphere, though a few have been stated as being capable of exoatmospheric or sub-orbital flight as well.

These aircraft appear in notable works of fiction, including novels, stories, films, TV series, animation, video games, comics, and other works. They are either the subject of the work or an important element.

== Fighters ==
- Advanced Dominance Fighter: A family of supermaneuverable air superiority superfighters developed by Gründer Industries in the Ace Combat series of video games.
  - ADFX-01/02 Morgan: A family of experimental fighters capable of carrying a chemical laser system and airburst missiles, first featured in Ace Combat Zero: The Belkan War.
  - ADF-01 FALKEN: A superfighter armed with an internal laser system, the ability to jam and disrupt HUDs, and backwards-fire capabilities. It is the first aircraft in the Ace Combat series with Connection For Flight Interface (COFFIN), featuring a fully enclosed cockpit with sensors for picking up electromagnetic wavelengths, and the use of eye movement and voice commands to control the aircraft. First featured in Ace Combat 2.
  - ADF-11F Raven: A modular superfighter that can optionally use a UCAV module in place of a manned cockpit, from Ace Combat 7: Skies Unknown. This UCAV can detach from its RAW-F wing unit and transform to fly on its own as the ADF-11. Unlike preceding ADF aircraft, the ADF-11F lacks forward-swept wings and rearward vertical stabilizers.
- Angel Interceptor: A carrier-based fighter jet from the 1967 TV series Captain Scarlet and the Mysterons. The aircraft operates from an airborne aircraft carrier named Cloudbase. The craft is based on the World Air Force Viper, powered by twin turbo-jet compressors feeding a single ramjet. It is armed with a nose cannon and rockets.
- ASF-X Shinden II: An experimental multirole fighter jet that features forward-swept wings, a two-tiered engine configuration (akin to that of the English Electric Lightning), and variable-geometry wing tips and vertical stabilizers. It was designed by Macross creator Shōji Kawamori for Ace Combat: Assault Horizon.
- ATD-0: A fictional fighter variant of the Mitsubishi X-2 Shinshin in Ace Combat Infinity, made as part of a collaboration with the Japanese Ministry of Defense.
- AV-14 Attack VTOL: A UNSC airborne attack vehicle, also known as the Hornet, from the Halo video game series.
- A/V-32 Pegasus: A fictional jump jet operated by the US Marine Corps in the Jim DeFelice novel Havana Strike.
- Cobra Rattler: A VTOL attack plane based on the Fairchild Republic A-10 Thunderbolt II. It made its first appearance in G.I. Joe: A Real American Hero in 1984.
- CFA-44 Nosferatu: An advanced carrier-based fighter jet with all-directional multi-purpose missiles (ADMMs), internal jamming pods, and dual railguns, from Ace Combat 6: Fires of Liberation.
  - QFA-44 Carmilla: A UCAV variant of the CFA-44 remotely operated by the "Butterfly Master", from Ace Combat Infinity.
- F-19 Ghostrider: based on the Have Blue project of the 1970s. The Testors Model Company released a conceptual model airplane in 1986, and Monogram followed with its own version in 1987. Earning massive media attention, the design became the shape of the mysterious "Stealth Fighter" in the public eye until the F-117 Nighthawk was unveiled in 1990. As it turned out, the sleek and low-profile design looked nothing like the highly angular, faceted F-117 it was meant to portray. The aircraft was described as the F-19A Ghostrider in the Tom Clancy novel Red Storm Rising. The book described the aircraft as being nicknamed the "Frisbee" and having no corners, high-bypass turbofans, and appearing to mimic the shape of a cathedral bell when viewed from above.
- F-41 Broadsword: A UNSC exoatmospheric multirole strike fighter. It is capable of operating within an atmosphere or in a vacuum; the F-41E variant features energy shielding, as seen in Halo 4. This craft comes from the Halo video game series.
- F-22V Velociraptor: A delta wing version of the F-22 Raptor featured in the Jim DeFelice novel Cyclops One.
- F-302 Fighter-Interceptor: An exoatmospheric combat craft developed, and initially fielded by, the Stargate franchise's depiction of the United States of America. Developed as a response to the imminent threat posed by the Milky Way galaxy's dominant power, the Goa'uld System Lords, it was described as having made use of various alien-derived technologies that had been procured through the series' eponymous Stargate Program. Among the various alien-based materials and subsystems said to have been incorporated into the aircraft were its inertial dampening systems, a 'Naquadah'-based airframe composite, and even a short-range 'hyperspace-window generator' granting it limited superluminal propulsion.
- F/A-32C Erne: A twin-engine stealth multirole aircraft developed by General Resource Limited, based on the Boeing X-32. From Ace Combat 3: Electrosphere.
- F/A-37 Talon: A single-seat fighter attack aircraft of the U.S. Navy, which appeared in the 2005 film Stealth. It is capable of Mach 3.5 and supercruise, and has a range of 4,000 miles. It is also accompanied by an AI-operated UAV, which assists in targeting and ISR for the Talon.
- F/A-40 Stalker: A stealth fighter used by the Western Coalition from Frontlines: Fuel of War. It is based on the F-22 Raptor.
- Firehawk: A VTOL multi-role fighter jet that appears in Command & Conquer 3. The craft is a two-seat, forward-swept wing design with rearwards-swept winglets and canards. It can be outfitted with special boosters that enable it to go sub-orbital, allowing it to bypass anti-aircraft fire.
- GAF-1 Varcolac: An advanced multirole fighter jet that features extreme maneuverability and a machine gun on the tail for defense against missiles. It was developed by the Golden Axe Plan from Ace Combat: Joint Assault.
- Gilbert XF-120: A fictitious X-plane portrayed by an XB-51 in camouflage, from the 1956 film Toward the Unknown.
- Gunyip: A multirole combat jet aircraft from Ty the Tasmanian Tiger 3: Night of the Quinkan operated by Bush Rescue. It has a gull wing configuration with dual winglets on both wingtips and uses a variety of weapons ranging from the wing-mounted autocannons, guided missiles, and lasers.
- Hughes Devastator: A fighter aircraft manufactured by Hughes Aircraft in Crimson Skies.
- Manta Fighter: A single-place 1939 twin-prop design, with a delta tail & straight wings near the aft, from the 2004 film Sky Captain and the World of Tomorrow.
- Mikoyan CF-121 Redhawk: An April Fools' prank detailing the RCAF purchase of thirty MiG-21s for Squadron 441 in 1960.
- MiG-28: A fictional aircraft flown by the antagonists in the 1986 film Top Gun. The real aircraft used to portray the MiG-28 was a Northrop F-5.

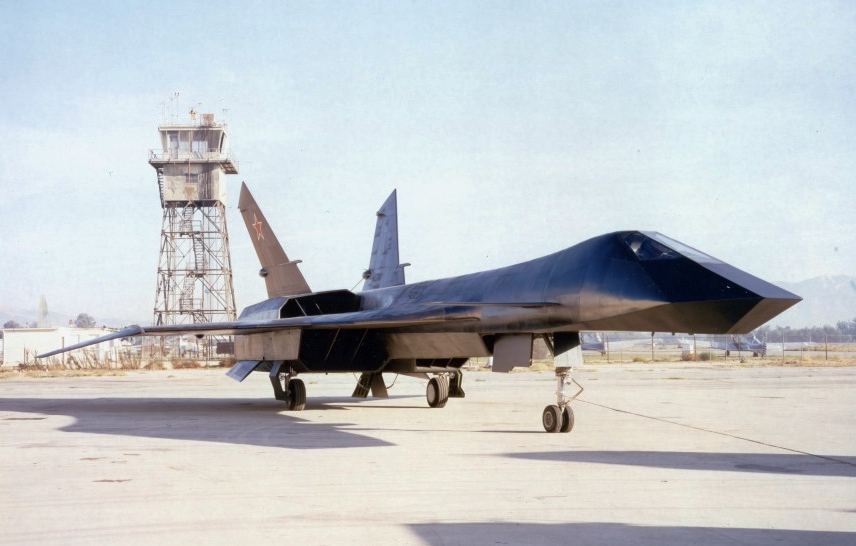
Full-scale MiG-31 Firefox model used in the film Firefox parked at Van Nuys Airport, California in May 1982

- MiG-31 Firefox: A fictional aircraft that appeared in Craig Thomas's novels Firefox and Firefox Down, as well as the 1982 film by the same name starring Clint Eastwood. The aircraft was portrayed as a Soviet interceptor with stealth capabilities, and had a thought-controlled weapons system. Its designation is shared with the real MiG-31 Foxhound.
- MiG-37 Ferret: A fictional Soviet stealth model aircraft, produced by Testors as a counter to the American F-19. The craft combined a faceted airframe design with cooled exhausts and radar-absorbing skin. Purely conjectural, the design nonetheless turned out to be closer in shape to the actual F-117 Nighthawk.
- MiG-242: A fictional Soviet aircraft appearing in the 1968 pilot episode of Joe 90, a British Supermarionation television series co-created by Gerry and Sylvia Anderson
- Pan Spatial Dragon wing: a VTOL Fighter that is Half Helicopter Half fighter jet.
- R-101 Delphinus #1: An agile fighter-attacker and the first R-Series aircraft developed by Neucom Incorporated, used as their main fighter during the Intercorporate War. First featured in Ace Combat 3: Electrosphere.
  - R-102 Delphinus #2: An evolved model with a single jet engine, more armor, and ability to fire pulse lasers.
  - R-103 Delphinus #3: The most advanced Delphinus model with higher top speed, more weapons variety, and greater stability.
- R-311 Remora: A parasite attacker developed by Neucom Incorporated. It is dropped from the R-531 Mobura at high altitude to rapidly attack ground facilities, then reattached to the aircraft. From Ace Combat 3: Electrosphere.
- RF-12A2 Blackbird: A large high-speed interceptor developed by General Resource Limited, based on the SR-71 Blackbird. Designed for combat within the stratosphere, it has a long-range interception radar and an internal bay re-engineered to carry missiles instead of reconnaissance equipment. However, its speed and weight make air combat maneuvering difficult. From Ace Combat 3: Electrosphere.
- Savoia S.21: A fictional fighter seaplane that appears in the anime film Porco Rosso, directed by Hayao Miyazaki. Its name is shared with the real-life Savoia S.21, but the two do not look similar.
- Su-38 Slamhound: A Russian Spetsnaz Guard Brigade support fighter in EndWar.
- Su-50 Flatlin: A Russian fifth-generation stealth fighter in Lars Wilderäng's book Midsommargryning.
- Tornado: Sonic the Hedgehog's personal biplane. First featured in Sonic the Hedgehog 2.
  - Tornado 2: An upgraded model built by Miles "Tails" Prower, able to alter its wings into an X-shape to become more maneuverable. First featured in Sonic Adventure.
  - Cyclone: Sometimes referred to as the "Tornado III", it is a rocket-powered monoplane that can transform into a bipedal battle mech for land combat or a four-wheeled vehicle for driving on roads. First featured in Sonic Adventure 2.
- UI-4054 Aurora: A secret aircraft used by Abyssal Dision, leader of the terrorist organization Ouroboros. It is partially based on the SR-91 Aurora myth. From Ace Combat 3: Electrosphere.
- VF-0 Phoenix: A prototype "variable fighter" from the Macross Zero sci-fi anime series, which can transform into mecha. It was designed and manufactured in-universe by Northrop Grumman for use by the U.N. Spacy against the Anti-UN Alliance.
- VF-1 Valkyrie: An evolution of the VF-0 that was primarily used by the U.N. Spacy against Zentradi during Space War I in Super Dimension Fortress Macross (adapted as Robotech in the US). Its design was inspired by the F-14 Tomcat, while its name was taken from the North American XB-70 Valkyrie. Prominently featured variants include:
  - VF-1A: Standard variant with one anti-aircraft laser cannon for armament. Dubbed "cannon fodder" due to its high loss rate during Space War I.
  - VF-1D: Two-seater variant with two anti-aircraft laser cannons. Primarily deployed as trainers.
  - VF-1J: Squadron leader's variant developed by Shinnakasu and Kyuusei Industries. Has two anti-aircraft laser cannons like the VF-1D and can be equipped with Shinnakasu GBP-1S "Armored" system.
  - VF-1S: Squadron commander's (in-universe equivalent of US Navy CAGs) variant. Carries the heaviest load with four anti-aircraft laser cannons and firepower upgrades. Primarily used by the Skull Squadron stationed aboard SDF-1 Macross.
- Willis JA-3: A rocket/jet-powered X-plane capable of 1,400 mph (2,300 km/h), from the 1950 film Chain Lightning, piloted by Humphrey Bogart's character.
- X-02 Wyvern: An advanced fighter aircraft developed by the fictional nation of Erusea, with 3D thrust vectoring nozzles and variable-geometry tail fins and wings that can switch between a forward- and backward-swept configuration. First featured in Ace Combat 04: Shattered Skies.
  - X-02S Strike Wyvern: A two-seat variant with an internally mounted electromagnetic launcher (EML), from Ace Combat 7: Skies Unknown.
- X-49 Night Raven: An advanced experimental fighter aircraft with a closed flying wing design. It is equipped with a laser cannon, and requires its pilot to undergo artificial nerve surgery in order to operate it. It was used by the terrorist organization Ouroboros during the Intercorporate War. First featured in Ace Combat 3: Electrosphere.
  - XR-900 Geopelia: A UCAV with optional manned piloting capability. Developed by Neucom Incorporated using the Night Raven as its basis. From Ace Combat 3: Electrosphere.
- XA-20 Razorback: A main support fighter in the United States Joint Strike Force in EndWar. The Razorback also appears in H.A.W.X as a reward for completing the game, where it is revealed it to have stealth capabilities.
- XFA-24A Apalis: An experimental multirole fighter developed in the 2010s, featuring a double-delta airframe with canards and a paddle-like thrust-vectoring design. First featured in Ace Combat X: Skies of Deception.
- XFA-27: A multirole fighter aircraft with variable geometry wings, boasting high maneuverability and the ability to fire off four missiles simultaneously (being the first aircraft in an Ace Combat game to do so). First featured in Ace Combat 2.
- XFA-33 Fenrir: A multirole aircraft possessing a massive airframe and equipped with the "COFFIN" system, optical camouflage, a microwave radiation gun, VTOL capabilities, thrust-vectoring engines, wingtips, delta wing configuration, canards and V-tail. First featured in Ace Combat X: Skies of Deception.
- XFA-36A Game: An advanced twin-engine stealth fighter developed by General Resource Limited, based on the McDonnell Douglas X-36. It is equipped with the "COFFIN" and "ENSI" systems and features a tailless lambda wing configuration with canards, folding wingtips, and multiple-vane 3D thrust vectoring. From Ace Combat 3: Electrosphere.
  - FA-36 Game: A precursor to the XFA-36A featuring a standard transparent canopy. From Ace Combat 8: Wings of Theve.
- XP-14F Skystriker: the primary air-superiority fighter used by G.I. Joe in the comics and animated series in the early 1980s, sold as a toy from 1983 to 1986. It closely resembles the real-life U.S. Navy F-14 Tomcat.
- XR-45 Cariburn: A highly maneuverable forward-swept wing twin-engine fighter equipped with the "COFFIN" system. First featured in Ace Combat X: Skies of Deception.
- Yak-12: A fictional Soviet jet aircraft featured in the film Jet Pilot starring John Wayne. A Lockheed T-33 was used to portray the fictitious plane. The designation does, however, exist in the form of the Yakovlev Yak-12, a utility airplane from the Soviet Union.
- YR-99 Forneus: A prototype twin-engine multirole stealth fighter built with a laminar flow control system to reduce drag. It uses radiation-absorbent material and onboard electronic equipment for its stealth. It is also equipped with the "COFFIN" system. First featured in Ace Combat X: Skies of Deception.
- YSS-1000 Sabre: A fictional spaceplane being developed by the UNSC. It appears in Halo: Reach.

== Bombers and attackers ==
- ADA-01A/01B ADLER: Two attacker variants of the ADF-01 FALKEN fighter. As the first aircraft in the ADA series developed by Gründer Industries, it was designed to complement the FALKEN and defend it from surface-to-air attacks. It was also designed to test the experimental "SDBM" weapon. It was planned to appear in Ace Combat 5: The Unsung War, but the idea was scrapped. The B model, which replaces the SDBM from the ADA-01A with the MPBM (Multi-Purpose Burst Missile), appears in Ace Combat Infinity as a playable aircraft. It is shown to have the same "COFFIN" system as the FALKEN.
- B-3: A fictional derivative of the B-2 Spirit featured in the 1996 film Broken Arrow and Command & Conquer: Generals – Zero Hour.
- B-39 Peacemaker: A fictional Cold War-era nuclear-powered USAF bomber in the Charles Stross novelette A Colder War.
- Bm-335 Lindwurm: A large strategic bomber with a prominent radome below the cockpit, used by the Belkan Air Force. From Ace Combat Zero: The Belkan War.
- EB-52 Megafortress: The Megafortress first appears in Dale Brown's novel Flight of the Old Dog and is expanded upon and upgraded in his later books. The design contains a long SST nose, with a stealth shape and twin V-tails. Its eight engines are later replaced by four larger turbofans.
- EB-1C Vampire: first appearing in Dale Brown's novel Battle Born, the EB-1C is an advanced variant of the real-life B-1 Lancer. It differs from the real B-1 in that its wings are always swept all the way back, the tail is smaller and lacks the horizontal stabilizer, and it utilizes "Mission Adaptive Skin" that uses micro-hydraulics to affect the shape of its wings in-flight.
- R-201 Asterozoa: A ground attack jet developed by Neucom Incorporated with a twin-hull fuselage, each having its own engine, cockpit, and weapons bay. From Ace Combat 3: Electrosphere.
- R-211 Orcinus: An advanced twin-engine supersonic attacker with laser weaponry developed by Neucom Incorporated. From Ace Combat 3: Electrosphere.
- SuperCOIL: A secretly developed radar-invisible B-2 variant, which carries an airborne "COIL" chemical laser powerful enough to shoot down missiles in mid-flight, featured in the thriller novel SuperCOIL by Robert Ari.
- YR-302 Fregata: A four-engine heavy attacker equipped with the "COFFIN" system, first featured in Ace Combat X: Skies of Deception.
- YRB-89: A large tactical bomber version of the YR-99 Forneus. From Ace Combat Xi: Skies of Incursion.

== Gunships ==
- AC400: A gunship inspired by the Airbus A400M Atlas, featured in the video game Turboprop Flight Simulator.
- AT-99 Scorpion: A VTOL gunship which uses two transverse ducted rotors for lift. It has a crew of one. The aircraft appears in the 2009 film Avatar.
- C-21 Dragon: A VTOL four-post ducted-fan transport and gunship, which appears in the film Avatar.
- R-701 Triakis: An attack helicopter developed by Neucom Incorporated. From Ace Combat 3: Electrosphere.
- SA-2 Samson: A ducted-fan transverse rotor utility assault transport from the film Avatar.
- Vertibird: A VTOL gunship similar to the V-22 Osprey in the Fallout video game series. It was developed before the apocalypse and used by the U.S military on many fronts. In the games, the aircraft is used by several factions, most notably the Enclave, New California Republic, and Brotherhood of Steel.

== Unmanned aerial vehicles ==
- Barrier drone: A support UAV deployed in groups by the rogue submarine Alicorn. It bears a unique hexagonal flying saucer shape with six rotors for movement. An electromagnetic emitter at the center of the drone creates a force field around it to protect the Alicorn for a few seconds. When the shield deactivates, the drone falls, evidently making them unusable after one use. From Ace Combat 7: Skies Unknown.
- EDI: Featured in the film Stealth, the Extreme Deep Invader (EDI) was developed as an assistant to the F/A-37 Talon. The craft has an artificial intelligence system that allows it to operate without a human pilot. The sensors can identify a human target by fingerprints, voice identification, or facial recognition. It has V/STOL capabilities and pulse detonation scramjet engines fueled by catalyzed A1 methane.
- MQ-90 Quox: A UCAV developed by the Japan Air Self-Defense Force. It uses a tailless W-wing configuration capable of extending or contracting. It originally appeared in Ace Combat: Ikaros in the Sky as the Q-X before being featured in Ace Combat Infinity as support for the QFA-44.
  - MQ-90L Quox bis: A variant of the MQ-90 equipped with a laser. From Ace Combat Infinity.
- MQ-99: A UCAV developed by Gründer Industries and used by Erusea to intercept enemy aircraft that cross the boundary lines of a "drone interceptor network". MQ-99s will launch if any pilot in the area does not identify themselves as friendly after a certain amount of time, and are also capable of being launched from shipping containers. It is based on the EADS Barracuda. From Ace Combat 7: Skies Unknown.
- MQ-101: A UCAV used by Erusea that resembles the Northrop Grumman X-47B. It is carried by the Arsenal Bird airborne aircraft carrier, which deploys them to defend itself from enemy aircraft. From Ace Combat 7: Skies Unknown.
- UAV-45: Also referred to as "Malebolge," a UCAV deployed in large numbers to support the CFA-44 Nosferatu in Ace Combat 6: Fires of Liberation.
- Weapon UAV: A UCAV that can be equipped to each wing of an ADF-11F Raven, detaching to protect the main craft. Its design resembles the Boeing X-45, and it features laser weaponry. From Ace Combat 7: Skies Unknown.

== Special operations ==
- Aerowing: An aircraft built by Lex Luthor. It has two fuselages, six engines and undernose guns, and was flown from the mid-Atlantic Ocean to the Amazon rainforest in the DC Comics book Elseworld's Finest #2.
- Airwolf: An attack helicopter from the 1984 TV series of the same name. It was capable of supersonic flight and carried retractable weapons. The helicopter used was a modified Bell 222.
- Albatross: Appears in New Captain Scarlet.
- AmphibiCopter: A 21st century submersible two-seater aircraft which appeared in the 2001 film A.I. Artificial Intelligence.
- Arkbird: A long-range low-orbiting lifting body spacecraft conceived by the nation of Osea. Its laser cannon was originally meant to neutralize space debris, but was repurposed to shoot down ground targets and ordnance alike. Further tampering with the design gave it the ability to deploy UCAVs and ballistic cannons for self-defense. From Ace Combat 5: The Unsung War.
- Batcopter: A modified Bell 47G-3 which made an appearance in the 1966 Batman film.
- Batwing: The aircraft was used in the 1989 Batman film starring Michael Keaton.
- Blue Thunder: A fictional police helicopter from the film and television series of the same name. The aircraft incorporated an optically tracked rotary gun, a "whisper mode" for quiet flight, surveillance equipment, and an infrared camera. The helicopter used in the film was a modified Aérospatiale Gazelle.
- Bubble ship: An aircraft that resembles a dragonfly combined with the canopy of a Bell 47 helicopter. The machine features rotating VTOL engines and a cockpit that swivels along with the upper and lower guns fixed to it. The craft was flown by Tom Cruise's character Jack Harper in the sci-fi film Oblivion.
- BV-38 Flying Wing: A bent-winged twin-prop transport, which appeared in the 1981 film Raiders of the Lost Ark.
- Cobra F.A.N.G.: A short range one-man light-attack gyrocopter, equipped with air-to-air heat-seeking rockets. This craft appeared in the comics and the first season of the G.I. Joe animated series, as well in the 1985 computer game.
- D79-TC Pelican: An extremely versatile dropship used by the UNSC, mainly for the transportation of personnel, vehicles and equipment. Occasionally used as a support gunship in the Halo video game franchise.
- SR-72 Darkstar: A prototype hypersonic jet powered by a scramjet based on the SR-72, capable of reaching speeds over Mach 10. Test-flown by the title character in Top Gun: Maverick.
- EA-200: A jammer aircraft used by the Estovakian Air Force in Ace Combat 6: Fires of Liberation. It resembles a modified Boeing 767.
- Egg Mobile: Doctor Eggman's personal egg-shaped hovercraft, capable of being fitted with various mech attachments, becoming the cockpit of the mech. First featured in Sonic the Hedgehog (1991).
- Flying Sub FS-1: Introduced in the Voyage to the Bottom of the Sea TV series, this hybrid submersible is capable of flight, as well as conducting underwater operations. The design resembles that of a stingray, with twin tail fins on the back, and has room for a crew of two.
- Gleipnir: An amphibious airborne fortress deployed by Leasath during the Aurelian War. It is equipped with thermobaric shock wave ballistic missiles, a meson-based shock cannon, and an optical camouflage system. From Ace Combat X: Skies of Deception.
  - Gandr: A prototype of the Gleipnir deployed early in the Aurelian War. From Ace Combat Xi: Skies of Incursion.
- Invisible Plane: from the Wonder Woman comic books and TV series.
- KC777 ASST: A tanker aircraft used by General Resource in Ace Combat 3: Electrosphere.
- Metal Carrier: A flying weapons platform used by Metal Sonic in Sonic the Hedgehog 4: Episode II. It can launch plasma balls and laser beams from its four laser cannons and fire cannonballs from its cannon.
- Ornithopter: A flapping-wing craft featured in the novel Dune by Frank Herbert and in the 1984 and the 2021 films of the same name.
- P-1113 Kottos: An airborne Electronic Support Measures to the Aigaion. Originally featured in Ace Combat 6: Fires of Liberation.
- P-1114 Gyges: An airborne support/backup to the Aigaion. Originally featured in Ace Combat 6: Fires of Liberation.
- Quinjet: A craft featured in the Avengers comic books and films. It is a multirole jet aircraft used by S.H.I.E.L.D, with VTOL capabilities and a tilted cockpit to provide pilots with better visibility during landings.
- R-501 Rhincodon: A large supersonic cargo plane developed by Neucom Incorporated. From Ace Combat 3: Electrosphere.
- Snowspeeder: A military variant of the T-47 airspeeder, adapted for cold climates. The craft appeared in the 1980 film The Empire Strikes Back.
- Spider's Wing: A flying wing aircraft used by the leader of the Spider Gang to terrorize citizens in the Dick Tracy comics.
- Spiridus: An airborne fortress developed under the Golden Axe Plan. It has a box wing design with large upward-canted winglets, as well as a second pair of winglets on the tail. The first model included a Balaur railgun, three air to ground electrolaser cannons, one anti-air electrolaser cannon, and infrared countermeasure shells. The second model added the READS electromagnetic shield and Hi-TASM thermobaric missiles. From Ace Combat: Joint Assault.
- Tiltrotor craft: A stealth VTOL tiltrotor vehicle used by the antagonists in the film Resident Evil: Afterlife. The craft has similarities to the real life V-22 Osprey.
- Thunderbird 2: From Thunderbirds. It is a bulbous VTOL cargo carrier that comes equipped with a variety of service modules.
- UH-144 Falcon: A tiltrotor troop transport used by the UNSC in the Halo franchise.
- UI-4052 Cralias: A dirigible loaded with a lethal biochemical weapon. The payload is released by crashing. From Ace Combat 3: Electrosphere.
- X-Jet Blackbird: Featured in the X-Men films, it is a modified SR-71 Blackbird with forward-swept wings and VTOL capabilities. The craft has room for a dozen personnel.
  - YF-12A X-Jet Prototype: The predecessor to the X-Jet and the SR-71, the aircraft was designed and flown by Hank McCoy. The prototype incorporates VTOL capabilities and an internal cargo hold for personnel. The plane appeared in the 2011 film X-Men: First Class.

== Airborne aircraft carriers ==
- Argo: A flying wing operated by Monarch that deploys and recovers V-22 Ospreys in Godzilla: King of the Monsters.
- Arsenal Bird: A large unmanned aircraft carrier designed to hold up to 80 MQ-101 UCAVs, featured in Ace Combat 7: Skies Unknown. It is a flying wing powered by numerous contra-rotating propeller engines and armed with three laser defense systems, air-to-air missile launchers, and a force field referred to as the Active Protection System (APS). Originally built by Osea to protect the International Space Elevator, the two Arsenal Birds in operation were later hijacked by Erusea before the events of the game. It also deploys beyond-visual-range "Helios" airburst missiles.
- Cloudbase/Skybase: A command ship and operational headquarters of the international security organisation Spectrum from Gerry Anderson's 1960s "Supermarionation" television series Captain Scarlet and the Mysterons and its 2005 computer-animated remake New Captain Scarlet.
- Daedalus: A flying aircraft carrier used by the STAG (Special Tactical Anti-Gang) unit in Saints Row: The Third.
- Egg Carrier: A flying fortress serving as a base of operations for Doctor Eggman. It can transform into a cruise form and a battle form. It is equipped with laser turrets, deployable air mines, missile launchers, and cannons along the body, a giant laser cannon inside the bow, and hangars for deployment of aerial robots. First featured in Sonic Adventure.
- Egg Cauldron: A cauldron-shaped flying fortress used by Doctor Eggman. It has missile launchers on top and can launch a large amount of aerial robots. From Sonic Unleashed.
- Fortress-1 and Fortress-2: A successive pair of massive vehicles employed by the fictional Cyberbiotics Corporation in the Disney animated series Gargoyles, commissioned by the firm's founder, the disabled CEO Halcyon Renard.
- Helicarrier: A series of massive carriers in Marvel comics that resemble conventional seaborne aircraft carriers and also serve as capital ships.
- Iron Vulture: An airship captained by the air pirate leader Don Karnage in the Disney animated series TaleSpin.
- Orgoi: A bomber and airborne aircraft carrier developed under the Golden Axe Plan. It has a flying wing design with two massive engines on the trailing edge of its wings, making it highly agile and able to perform erratic maneuvers. Ventral weapons bays carrying bomb loads are along the underside. From Ace Combat: Joint Assault.
- P-1112 Aigaion: An airborne closed flying wing "heavy command cruiser" armed with "Nimbus" airburst cruise missiles (delegating terminal guidance to Searcher UAVs for long-range strikes). It also serves as a base for the infamous Estovakian elite squadron "Strigon Team". Originally featured in Ace Combat 6: Fires of Liberation.
- Pandora: An airship used by Nathan Zachary and his air pirate gang the Fortune Hunters in the Crimson Skies game franchise.
- R-531 Mobura: A stratospheric transport aircraft developed by Neucom Incorporated. It is shaped like a manta ray and carries two R-311 Remoras to deploy for attack missions. From Ace Combat 3: Electrosphere.
- Royal Navy flying aircraft carriers: Appear in Sky Captain and the World of Tomorrow.
- UI-4053 Sphyrna: A dirigible used as the main headquarters of the terrorist organization Ouroboros. It functions as an ECM platform and can launch and recover several types of aircraft, including the X-49 Night Raven. From Ace Combat 3: Electrosphere.
- Valiant: A flying command ship/aircraft carrier used by UNIT in Doctor Who.
- XB-0 Hresvelgr: A huge airborne twin-boom "heavy command cruiser" with six jet engines and a wingspan of 503 m (1,650 ft), from Ace Combat Zero: The Belkan War. It is purportedly able to carry and deploy up to 50 fighter planes.
- Airship cargo transports that carry mercenary fighter squadrons for protection are featured in the 2019 anime series The Magnificent Kotobuki.

== Civilian ==
=== Commercial ===
- Antonov 500: A heavy transport that appears in the film 2012. It is based on the Antonov An-225 Mriya (and possibly the An-325, an even larger variant that was proposed, but never built.) but is outfitted with a rear cargo ramp, presumably in addition to the front ramp.
- Budgie the Little Helicopter
- Carreidas 160: A prototype supersonic business jet with 10 seats, seen in Flight 714 to Sydney, one of The Adventures of Tintin.
- Elgin E-474: Featured in the 2005 film Flightplan, based on the Airbus A380.
- Jimbo and the Jet-Set
- Fireflash: A hypersonic transport featured in Thunderbirds TV series.
- Hindenburg III: An upgraded dirigible featured in the film Sky Captain and the World of Tomorrow.
- Norton N-22: A wide-body passenger aircraft at the center of a safety investigation in Michael Crichton's novel Airframe.
- Rutland Reindeer: Appeared in No Highway in the Sky, a film based loosely on Neville Shute's No Highway. The aircraft used was a modified Handley Page Halifax.
- Skyfleet S570: A prototype airplane that appeared in the 2006 film Casino Royale, which was actually a Boeing 747-200 originally owned by British Airways. It was refitted with two mock-up engines on each inner pylon and external fuel tanks on the outer pylons, somewhat anachronistically resembling a B-52 Stratofortress.
- Spectrum Passenger Jet: A twin-turbojet personnel transport, from Captain Scarlet and the Mysterons.
- Starflight: A hypersonic transport which was featured in the 1983 TV movie Starflight: The Plane That Couldn't Land.
- Rocket plane: A Concorde-like rocket-powered plane used by the Nazi Empire in The Man in the High Castle novel and TV series.
- Luxemburg (LZ131): A dirigible based on a Zeppelin design, which appeared in the climatic ending of the 1991 film The Rocketeer.

=== Personal ===
- Albatross: A 19th-century large propeller-powered airship in the novel Robur the Conqueror, aka Clipper of the Clouds by Jules Verne, and in the film version of Verne's Master of the World.
- Capsule 576 Airplane: A VTOL plane flown by Krillin, Yamcha and Bulma.
- Conwing L-16: An amphibious seaplane based on the Fairchild C-119 Flying Boxcar, featured in the animated Disney series TaleSpin, an example of which is the Sea Duck flown by bush pilot Baloo.
- Drake Bullet: An air racer flown by Clark Gable's character in the 1938 film Test Pilot. A Seversky P-35 was used to fulfill the aircraft's role.
- Harold the Helicopter: A cartoon helicopter based on the Sikorsky H-19, featured in the Thomas & Friends TV series.
- Kelvin 40: A concept jet by Marc Newson, first exhibited in 2004 at the Fondation Cartier pour l’Art Contemporain.
- Möwe: A jet-powered motor glider–like craft used by the titular character in Nausicaä of the Valley of the Wind. The craft was brought from fiction to reality by fans of the film under the name OpenSky.
- R-505U: A passenger aircraft used by the Universal Peace Enforcement Organization for the transportation of high-ranking personnel. From Ace Combat 3: Electrosphere.
- T-16 Skyhopper: Luke Skywalker's canyon flyer on the planet Tatooine, which appeared in Star Wars: A New Hope.
- The Terror: A 19th-century land, sea and air craft invented by Robur the Conqueror, featured in Jules Verne's The Master of the World.

== See also ==
- Aircraft in fiction
- Airborne aircraft carrier
- List of fictional spacecraft
