= Firefox (novel) =

1977 thriller novel by Craig Thomas

- First edition cover
- Author: Craig Thomas
- Language: English
- Genre: Techno-thriller
- Publisher: Michael Joseph (UK) & Holt, Rinehart and Winston (USA)
- Publication date: 8 August 1977
- Publication place: United Kingdom
- Media type: Print (hardback and paperback)
- Pages: 288 pp (first edition, hardback)
- ISBN: 0-03-020791-6 (first edition, hardback) & ISBN 0-7181-1570-8 (UK hardback edition)
- OCLC: 2966300
- Dewey Decimal: 823/.9/14
- LC Class: PZ4.T4543 Fi3 PR6070.H56
- Followed by: Firefox Down

Firefox is a thriller novel by British novelist Craig Thomas, published in 1977. Set amid the Cold War, the plot recounts an attempt by the CIA and MI6 to steal a highly advanced Soviet fighter jet. The lead character, Mitchell Gant, is an American fighter pilot and Vietnam veteran turned spy. The novel was made into a 1982 film adaptation produced, directed by, and starring Clint Eastwood. A bestseller, the book had 33 printings in the 17 years following its publication, and has been credited with starting the "techno-thriller" genre.

Friends with Royal Air Force backgrounds helped Thomas research the novel's subject. Despite its level of detail, he finished it in only four and a half months. Sphere Books printed a 250,000-copy paperback edition, leveraging the recent 1976 defection of Viktor Belenko, a Soviet Air Defence pilot who flew his MiG-25 Foxbat to Japan and gained asylum in the United States. Belenko's defection occurred just before Thomas finished the novel, and is referred to in the story. Firefox was followed by a sequel, Firefox Down, in 1983.

== Plot summary ==
During the Cold War, British and American intelligence services learn of the MiG-31 aircraft developed by the Soviet Union. The plane (given the NATO code name "Firefox") embodies a number of technology advances – including stealth technology, hypersonic flight above Mach 5 and a thought-guided weapons system – dramatically surpassing those of the West.

Faced with an aircraft which will give the Soviet Union the ability to completely dominate the skies, the CIA and MI6 launch a joint mission to steal one of the two Firefox prototype aircraft. Their plan involves using veteran US Air Force fighter pilot Mitchell Gant, who travels to the Soviet Union under an assumed identity. On paper, Gant is ideally trained to steal Firefox, being fluent in Russian and having already flown captured Soviet planes. Overlooked by his superiors is Gant's wartime experiences in Vietnam, including his capture by Viet Cong after being shot down, an ordeal exacerbated when the enemy guerrillas are wiped out almost immediately by napalm from an American air strike.

With the help of a network of dissidents and sympathizers, Gant reaches Bilyarsk air base where the two prototype aircraft are being developed. Jewish dissident scientists, forced to work on the project, help Gant penetrate the base, then start a fire to destroy the second prototype and also to distract security troops while Gant steals one of the planes. Having escaped with the plane, Gant first heads east to the Ural Mountains, then turns south toward Turkey. The Soviets reason that Gant must escape north to the Arctic Circle or south to Turkey, a NATO member. The plane lacks fuel to reach China, and even with stealth capability would never risk the dense Moscow defences to the west. Gant intentionally encounters an Aeroflot jetliner, then vanishes north, hoping to mislead his pursuers. As a result, the Soviets concentrate their search to the south.

Gant hugs the eastern slopes of the Ural Mountains to evade Soviet acoustical listening stations, but is spotted and fired upon by a SAM station equipped with infrared search and track sensors. Gant decoys the incoming infrared homing missiles by destroying a Badger aircraft that chances upon the scene. Gant escapes, but the Soviets are now alerted to his heading and redirect their search efforts to the Barents Sea area of the Arctic. A Soviet missile cruiser spots Gant and attacks, firing missiles and attempting to launch a helicopter. Gant destroys the helicopter, but he is now nearly out of fuel so he climbs to stretch out his range. His receiver then detects the homing signal, directing Gant to an ice floe. Landing, Gant finds an American submarine bearing kerosene fuel and using the floe as an ad-hoc runway. The Americans rearm and refuel the Firefox, giving Gant the necessary range, but barely finish before the arrival of a Soviet submarine.

Thinking that he has made good his escape, Gant finds himself under attack by the second Firefox prototype. Realizing that the Soviet scientists failed to destroy the second plane, Gant is forced to dogfight. The second MiG is flown by Firefox test-pilot Tretsov, who is more experienced in the Firefox aircraft and consistently outflies Gant. Nevertheless, after desperate manoeuvrers, Gant realises that the second plane has been destroyed – during the dogfight he reflexively ordered the thought-controlled weapons system to eject a decoy flare, which was immediately ingested by the second MiG's jet intake, triggering an internal explosion that destroyed it. Free of pursuit, Gant continues on his journey.

== Characters ==
- Mitchell Gant – American fighter pilot and spy, protagonist
- Kenneth Aubrey – British spy master
- Colonel Mihail Yurievich Kontarsky – Soviet head of counterintelligence at the Bilyarsk air base
- Dmitri Priabin – Soviet intelligence officer serving under Colonel Kontarsky at the Bilyarsk air base.
- Peter Shelley – British agent
- Charles Buckholtz – American agent with the CIA
- General Med Vladimirov – Soviet Air Force commandant of the "Wolfpack" tasked with stopping Gant.
- Air Marshal Mihail Ilyich Kutuzov – Soviet Air Force chief
- Yuri Andropov – Head of the KGB (as he was when the novel was written in the mid-1970s)

== Inspiration ==
By the time Thomas began writing Firefox the Soviets had introduced into operational service the MiG-25 Foxbat, the fastest interceptor aircraft in the world, with a top speed of Mach 2.8. Its appearance in the USSR and the Near East (overflying Israel with impunity) caused a stir in Western aviation and intelligence communities. Thomas' fictional MiG-31 was depicted on the cover of many printings as the MiG-25. At the time of the book's first issue in 1977, stealth technology was a subject of top secret research in defence establishments (Lockheed Have Blue had its first flight in 1977) and had not been operationally deployed (though the Lockheed SR-71 did exhibit stealth-like features). The publisher of the book's first paperback edition, Sphere, gambled on real-life events such as the 1976 defection of the Soviet pilot Viktor Belenko, to risk a 250,000-copy printing. The background material for Firefox was a result of meticulous research, and provided by friends formerly with the RAF, and the Russian setting was derived from guidebooks as he could not afford to visit Moscow.

== Adaptations and sequels ==
Firefox was made into a film by Warner Brothers based on the novel and released in 1982. Clint Eastwood was the director, producer, and played Mitchell Gant. The novel Firefox Down is a continuation of the story of Firefox, beginning at the moment at which the previous book had concluded.

Many of the characters of Firefox and Firefox Down return for the novel Winter Hawk (1987) and A Different War (1997).

== Release details ==
- 1977, USA, Holt Rinehart and Winston ISBN 0-03-020791-6, Pub date 1 August 1977, hardback (First edition)
- 1977, UK, Michael Joseph ISBN 0-7181-1570-8, Pub date 8 August 1977, hardback
- 1978, UK, Sphere ISBN 0-7221-0445-6, Pub date 27 July 1978, paperback
- 1978, USA, Bantam Books ISBN 0-553-11820-X, Pub date ? ? 1978, paperback
- 1988, USA, Time Warner ISBN 0-7515-1138-2, Pub date 1 January 1988, paperback (reissue)
- 1992, USA, Chivers Audio Books ISBN 0-7451-4096-3, Pub date ? December 1992, Audio book cassette (narrated by Stephen Thorne)
