= Firefox Down =

1983 novel by Craig Thomas

- First edition (publ. Michael Joseph)
- Author: Craig Thomas
- Language: English
- Publication date: 1983

Firefox Down is a 1983 novel by author Craig Thomas. It is a sequel to his novel Firefox. Craig Thomas dedicated the first edition of the novel to actor/director/producer Clint Eastwood, who starred as Mitchell Gant in the film adaptation of the first novel, stating, "For Clint Eastwood — pilot of the Firefox".

== Plot summary ==
As with the first novel, the book focuses on the efforts of Mitchell Gant to steal the fictional prototype MiG-31 Firefox Soviet aircraft. At the climax of Firefox, Gant engaged in combat with a second MiG-31; the second novel begins mere moments later, with Gant discovering that his aircraft sustained damage in the dogfight and is losing fuel rapidly. After a brief engagement with two Soviet MiG-25s, Gant lands the Firefox on a frozen lake in neutral Finland, whereupon the weight of the aircraft causes it to break through the ice and become submerged.

Upon fleeing the lake, Gant is captured by the KGB and taken back to the Soviet Union, while a NATO task force attempts to recover the Firefox from the lake before its location is discovered by the Soviets. In Moscow, Gant is interrogated by KGB Colonel Dmitri Priabin (who had a minor role in Firefox) and Soviet Air Force General Vladimirov, the officer charged with recovering the Firefox. Gant resists the interrogation, and eventually escapes from the KGB facility. Meanwhile, Priabin has discovered that his lover, Anna, has been passing information to the Americans under the codename Burgoyne, but he keeps this to himself.

After Gant's escape, Anna is ordered by the British, under threat of death, to find and help Gant escape from the Soviet Union. A member of the Jewish dissident network finds Gant and delivers him to Anna, who arranges for them to travel by train to Leningrad, where Harris, a British agent, will drive Gant to the Finnish border. Priabin discovers that Anna is helping Gant, and pursues them alone.

Priabin catches up with them and attempts to kill Gant, who points out that if he is killed or recaptured, Anna will also be killed by her handlers. Gant offers to arrange for the Company to release Anna as an informant, in exchange for Anna accompanying him over the border, to which Priabin reluctantly agrees.

Near the border, Priabin returns and kills Harris. While Gant searches for Harris, Priabin rashly tries to force Anna to return to Moscow with him, despite her protests. Gant returns after finding Harris' body and knocks out Priabin, leaving him by the roadside. At the border, Gant and Anna are allowed to cross. Priabin, now obsessed with killing Gant, arrives and orders the border guards to fire at Gant's car, but end up killing Anna instead, while Gant escapes across the border.

By this time, the Soviets have discovered the location of the Firefox. Vladimirov attempts to capture it intact, but is overruled by the First Secretary, who orders its destruction. Gant learns that due to bad weather, the mission to recover the Firefox has failed, and they are resorting to dismantling what they can before the Soviets arrive. Gant, not willing to let those who have helped him to have died in vain, declares that he will fly the Firefox from the lake.

The aircraft is prepared for flight, but it is discovered that the anti-radar capability is no longer functioning. Nonetheless, Gant successfully takes off, narrowly avoiding destruction by Mi-24 helicopters, and is then pursued by MiGs into Norway. With the aircraft's systems deteriorating, Gant attempts to land at Bardufoss, but it is closed due to the weather, so Gant heads for his original destination of RAF Scampton, using the Firefox's speed advantage to outrun the MiGs. Gant is almost killed again when his oxygen supply malfunctions, and is barely able to activate the emergency supply. Despite MiGs being scrambled from Rostock to intercept him, the RAF reach Gant first, and escort him to safety.

== Reception ==
A 1984 review in School Library Journal rated Firefox Down as "nearly equal to its predecessor", faulting Thomas' characterization of Gant as having gained "superhuman qualities" with "unbelievable poise".

== Legacy ==
Unlike its predecessor, Firefox Down did not become a feature film. The book, however, depicts the MiG-31 from the movie on the cover and the text of the novel describes it as black, as it was in the movie, rather than the original silver.

=== Continuity ===
Aside from being an immediate sequel to Firefox, Firefox Down fits within the larger fictional universe of the Craig Thomas novels.

Mitchell Gant continues his appearances in the novels Winter Hawk (1987) and A Different War (1997). The characters Colonel Kontarsky, Vasilly, General Vladimirov, the Communist Party of the Soviet Union (CPSU) First Secretary, and Kenneth Aubrey return from Firefox. Yuri Andropov, who was the Chairman of the KGB in Firefox (first published in 1977) retains this role, even though by the time the sequel was published, he had already become the General Secretary of the CPSU, as explained in a prefatory note inserted by the author. Dmitri Priabin reappears in later books as well, though mostly by reference. As with Gant, Priabin has a major role as an antagonist/protagonist in Winter Hawk, largely based on a personal vendetta against Gant due to the events of Firefox Down. Alan Waterford features as well in Snow Falcon, and CIA Deputy Director Charles Buckholz appears in several other novels.
