= Craig Thomas (author) =

Welsh author of thrillers (1942–2011)

- Born: 1942; Cardiff, Wales
- Died: 4 April 2011 (aged 68); Somerset, England
- Occupations: Teacher; novelist
- Writing career
- Period: 1982–2011
- Genres: Techno-thriller, Essay

Craig Thomas (1942 – 4 April 2011) was a Welsh author of thrillers, most notably the Mitchell Gant and Kenneth Aubrey series of novels.

== Background ==
Thomas was the son of the Western Mail rugby union writer JBG Thomas. He was educated at Cardiff High School. He graduated from University College, Cardiff in 1967, obtaining his M.A. after completing a thesis on Thomas Hardy. Thomas became an English teacher, working at Stafford Girl’s High School, Shire Oak Grammar School in Walsall Wood, where he was Head of the English Department, as well as King Edward VI Grammar School in Lichfield and other grammar schools in the West Midlands.

== Writing career ==
After unsuccessfully trying script writing for radio, Thomas wrote part-time, with his wife as editor, in two fields: philosophical thoughts in books of essays; and techno-thrillers, a genre whose invention is often attributed to the better-known Tom Clancy, though many fans feel that Thomas was its true originator. Most of Thomas's novels are set within MI6 and feature the characters of Sir Kenneth Aubrey and Patrick Hyde.

His best-known novel was Firefox, which brought him to global prominence and spawned a successful film adaptation, directed by and starring Clint Eastwood. After publishing his third novel, the Cold War espionage thriller Wolfsbane, he left teaching altogether, in 1977. His later books include Snow Falcon and A Different War. Shortly before his death he finished a two-volume commentary on German philosopher Friedrich Nietzsche.

Thomas and his wife Jill had lived in Whittington near Lichfield, Staffordshire for over 25 years, but moved to Somerset in 2010. He died at age 68 on 4 April 2011 from pneumonia, following a short battle with acute myeloid leukemia.

== Publications ==
- Rat Trap – Michael Joseph, London (1976)
- Firefox – Michael Joseph, London (1977)
- Wolfsbane – Michael Joseph, London (1978)
- Moscow 5000 – Michael Joseph, London (1979) (as David Grant)
- Snow Falcon – Michael Joseph, London (1980)
- Emerald Decision – Michael Joseph, London (1980) (as David Grant)
- Sea Leopard – Michael Joseph, London (1981)
- Jade Tiger – Michael Joseph, London (1982)
- Firefox Down – Michael Joseph, London (1983)
- The Bear's Tears – Michael Joseph, London (1985) (published in the United States as Lion's Run)
- Winter Hawk – Collins, London (1987)
- All the Grey Cats – Collins, London (1988) (published in the United States as Wildcat (1989))
- The Last Raven – Collins, London (1990)
- A Hooded Crow – HarperCollins, London (1992)
- Playing with Cobras – HarperCollins, London (1993)
- A Wild Justice – HarperCollins, London (1995)
- A Different War – Little Brown, (1997)
- Slipping into Shadow – Little Brown (1998)

Non-fiction

- There to Here: Ideas of Political Society – HarperPerennial, London (1991)
