= Firefox (mythology) =

Finnish mythical creature

Firefox (tulikettu or tulirepo or tulikko) is a mythical creature in the folklore of northern and eastern Finland. It is a fox whose tail twinkles fire.

According to folk stories, the Firefox lives far away in hideouts in the woods, or in the north, and very few are said to have seen it. Firefox is black during days but twinkles fire during nights. When Firefox's skin is brushed in a right manner it glitters strange light. According to stories, the leather of a Firefox has been used to illuminate powder storages at nights instead of dangerous open fire. The leather of a Firefox has been considered as immensely valuable. Hunters dream of the Firefox, since it has been said that catching it makes the hunter rich for the rest of his life.

Firefox has given its name for northern lights which are called "fox's fires" (revontulet) in the Finnish language. In Lapland it has been told that the Firefox causes the northern lights with its tail which flings sparks when it touches low hanging branches or bushes while the fox is running.

On December 12, 2025, NASA published a photograph of a wild fox under the northern lights as their Astronomy Picture of the Day, taken by photographer Dennis Lehtonen in Kilpisjärvi, Finland, and referencing Finnish mythology in the description.
