= Firefox (film) =

1982 film directed by Clint Eastwood

- Theatrical release poster
- Directed by: Clint Eastwood
- Screenplay by: Alex Lasker; Wendell Wellman
- Based on: Firefox by Craig Thomas
- Produced by: Clint Eastwood
- Starring: Clint Eastwood
- Cinematography: Bruce Surtees
- Edited by: Ron Spang; Ferris Webster
- Music by: Maurice Jarre
- Production company: Malpaso Productions
- Distributed by: Warner Bros.
- Release dates: June 13, 1982 (Washington, D.C.); June 18, 1982 (U.S.)
- Running time: 136 minutes
- Country: United States
- Language: English; Russian
- Budget: $21 million
- Box office: $70.7 million

Firefox is a 1982 American action techno-thriller film produced, directed by, and starring Clint Eastwood. The cast also includes Freddie Jones, Kenneth Colley, Warren Clarke, and Nigel Hawthorne. Based on the 1977 novel of the same name by Craig Thomas, Firefox is the only film appearance of Thomas's character Mitchell Gant. The film recounts Gant's mission to secretly enter the Soviet Union, hijack a cutting-edge fighter plane, and fly the aircraft back into U.S. and British hands.

Although the story is largely set in the Soviet Union, Cold War considerations meant that Eastwood's and Fritz Manes's Malpaso Company used several locations in Austria, including Vienna, for many scenes. One source states that the film was shot on a $21 million budget, the largest-ever production budget for Malpaso. Another source indicates that over $20 million was spent on special effects. The effects have been called "particularly innovative", as the "reverse bluescreen" technique was invented for the film.

Firefox was also inspired by the 1976 defection of Viktor Belenko, a Soviet Air Defense pilot who flew his MiG-25 Foxbat to Japan. Belenko's defection took place shortly before Thomas finished writing his novel. The film continues to be discussed, and its futuristic "thought-control" helmet has been compared to 21st century brain–computer interface devices. Considered one of Eastwood's "most personal" works, it was praised for its special effects, flying scenes, and thriller aspects, although critics took issue with the film's pacing, running time, and character development. Grossing $70 million in worldwide, the film "was a modest box-office success".

== Plot ==
MiG-31 Firefox, the film's fictional aircraft

A joint British–American plan is devised to steal the MiG-31 "Firefox", a highly advanced Soviet fighter jet. Capable of Mach 6 hypersonic flight, the Firefox is invisible to radar and carries weaponry controlled by human thought, threatening to give the Soviets a military advantage over the West. Retired U.S. Air Force Major Mitchell Gant—an experienced pilot, Vietnam veteran, ex-member of an aggressor squadron, and former prisoner of war—is deemed well-suited for the task, despite his affliction with "delayed stress syndrome". Air Force Captain Buckholz makes an unannounced helicopter trip to Gant's home in Alaska and explains the mission.

Gant has two further advantages: he speaks Russian, thanks to his Russian mother, and will be aided by a network of Soviet dissidents, three of whom are scientists working on the fighter plane itself. His mission, as directed by the British–American team and arranged by the S.I.S., is to infiltrate the Soviet Union, steal the Firefox, and fly it back to friendly territory for analysis. Kenneth Aubrey, the British spymaster guiding the plan, briefs Gant in London.

Gant enters Moscow disguised as Leon Sprague, a businessman and heroin smuggler. Gant and the dissidents make a rendezvous with the real Sprague but, to the shock of Gant, one of them kills Sprague and plants Gant's false identification papers on the corpse. Gant assumes several identities during his mission. He is questioned by a KGB agent in a metro station, but blows his cover and kills the agent in a fight, barely escaping the station afterward. While the KGB is concerned about the Firefox, they do not yet know who Gant is. Aided by the dissidents, Gant remains one step ahead of the KGB and reaches the air base at Bilyarsk, where the Firefox prototype is under heavy guard.

The dissidents working on the Firefox help Gant infiltrate the base. Pyotr Baranovich, one of the dissident scientists, briefs Gant about the aircraft and warns that there is a second prototype in the hangar. A fire will destroy the second plane and cause a diversion, allowing Gant to hijack the first plane. Gant knocks out Lt. Colonel Yuri Voskov, a Soviet pilot assigned to perform a test flight while the Soviet First Secretary visits. Alone with the unconscious Voskov, Gant decides to spare his life. The KGB finally learns Gant's identity, but it is too late. Although the scientists start the fire, the second prototype survives. Baranovich is singled out by Soviet personnel and draws a pistol, managing to shoot one of the guards before he is gunned down. As the commotion unfolds, Gant boards the Firefox and taxis out of the hangar. Colonel Kontarsky orders his men to open fire, but Gant successfully takes off. The British–American team, monitoring Soviet communications, realize that he is airborne.

The Soviet First Secretary contacts Gant and tells him to return the plane. After Gant refuses, he orders the plane destroyed. Gant begins flying south to confuse his pursuers, then turns north. He narrates his actions on the cockpit voice recorder while the Soviets frantically try to stop him. General Vladimirov plans a trap for the Firefox, but Gant destroys a Soviet plane instead, and the First Secretary berates Vladimirov. Gant engages a homing device en route to a U.S. submarine, which will refuel him after he lands on the polar ice pack. A Soviet ship launches missiles, but none hit the plane. Gant reaches the submarine, whose crew refuel and rearm the Firefox. However, Gant's decision to let Voskov live has consequences—the Soviet pilot flies the second prototype, with orders to intercept him in the North Cape area. Gant is flying home when Voskov appears, engaging him in a dogfight. After a hard-fought battle, Gant fires a rearward missile with the aircraft's thought-control system, and Voskov's plane is destroyed. Gant continues his flight to safety.

== Cast ==
- Clint Eastwood as Major Mitchell Gant
- Freddie Jones as Kenneth Aubrey
- David Huffman as Captain Arthur Buckholz
- Warren Clarke as Pavel Upenskoy
- Ronald Lacey as Dr. Maxim Ilyich Semelovsky
- Kenneth Colley as Colonel Kontarsky
- Klaus Löwitsch as General Vladimirov
- Nigel Hawthorne as Dr. Pyotr Baranovich
- Stefan Schnabel as First Secretary
- Thomas Hill as General Brown
- Curt Lowens as Dr. Schuller
- Clive Merrison as Major Viktor Lanyev
- Kai Wulff as Lieutenant Colonel Yuri Voskov
- Dimitra Arliss as Dr. Natalia Baranovich
- Austin Willis as Walters
- Michael Currie as Captain Seerbacker
- Alan Tilvern as Air Marshal Kutuzov
- Oliver Cotton as Dmitri Priabin
- Hugh Fraser as Police Inspector Aleksei Tortyev
- Wolf Kahler as KGB Chairman Yuri Andropov
- George Pravda as General Borov
- John Ratzenberger as Chief Peck

== Production ==
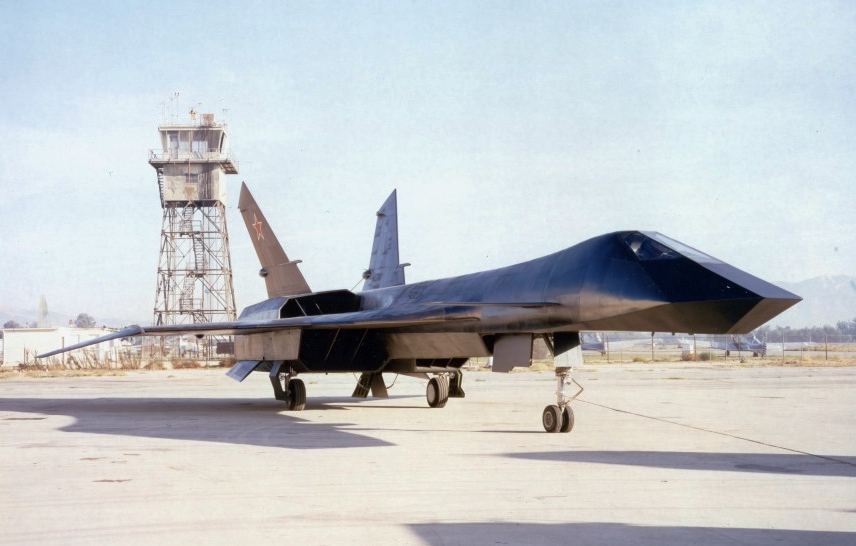
Full-scale MiG-31 Firefox model used in the film, parked at Van Nuys Airport, California in May 1982

The film is based on the creation of a "mythical" super fighter: the MiG-31 Firefox. The original Firefox from the novel was nearly identical in appearance to the Mikoyan-Gurevich MiG-25. The more intimidating version seen in the movie, however, takes many of its design cues from the SR-71 Blackbird. In the sequel novel, Firefox Down, the Firefox's appearance is described as matching the one in the film. For filming, four large-scale replicas were created, along with one full-size model measuring 66 ft (20 m) long, 44 ft (13 m) wide, and 20 ft (6.1 m) high. The full-size model was built from a radio station broadcast-antenna skeleton and was capable of taxiing at 30–40 mph (48–64 km/h).

=== Development ===
On April 25, 1977, Publishers Weekly reported that Talent Associates purchased the film rights to Craig Thomas’ novel from Holt, Rinehart and Winston. However, on June 6, 1979, Hollywood Reporter claimed that Warner Bros. had acquired the property earlier. On September 11, 1980, Daily Variety announced Clint Eastwood's involvement. According to production notes held in the AMPAS files, Eastwood first hesitated to make the story into a film, worried that its appeal would be limited, but after reading the book he decided to move forward.

=== Filming ===
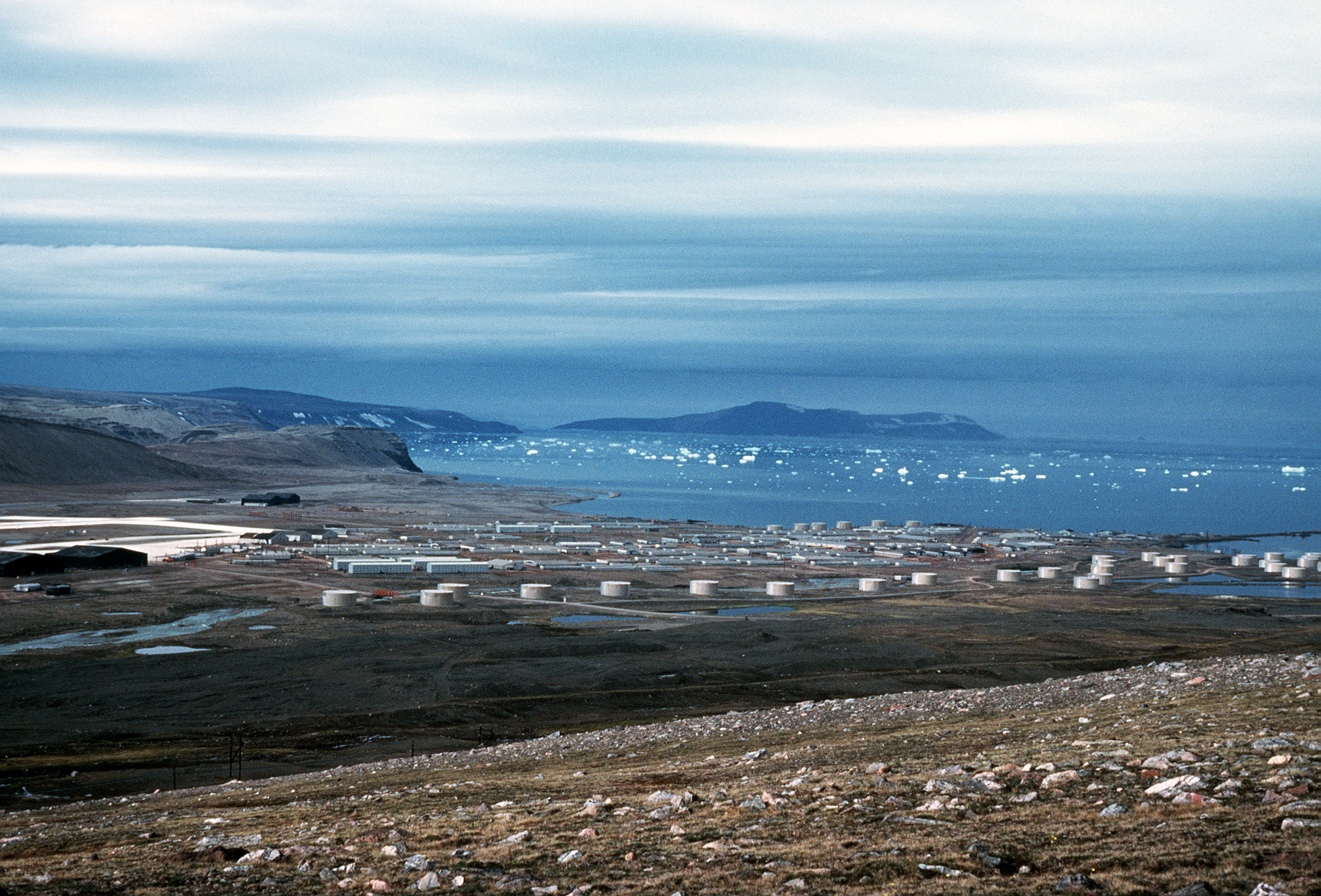
Thule Air Force Base in Greenland, seen in 1984, where flight consultant Clay Lacy flew a Learjet 23 for filming

Production began with principal photography on August 26, 1981, in San Diego, Los Angeles, and Vienna, Austria. Filming occurred at other locations also, including Montana, London, and Greenland's Thule Air Force Base. Second unit filming was in San Diego, California. Hollywood aerial cinematographer Clay Lacy flew second unit aerial sequences in a Learjet 23 high-speed aerial platform, for scenes that were later integrated into the film. Clay Lacy's flying cost "$1,200 an hour, across the western U.S. and to the Thule Air Force Base in Greenland, with $150,000 worth of computer and camera equipment on board", with the recorded footage to "be stored and played back as backdrops when composited with shots of the model planes filmed against a blue screen".

=== Special effects ===
In August 1982, Moviegoer magazine reported that, in 1981, Eastwood had "approached John Dykstra ... to develop special effects for the Firefox airplane". As special effects supervisor for the film, Dykstra pioneered a new technique for shooting the complex flying sequences, called reverse blue-screen photography. This involved coating the model with phosphorus paint and photographing it first with strong lighting against a black background and then with ultraviolet light to create the necessary male and female mattes to separate the foreground model and the background footage. This enabled the shiny black model to be photographed flying against a clear blue sky and gleaming white snow; compare this with traditional bluescreen technique used in The Empire Strikes Back. The original scale model made by Greg Jein used in the bluescreen work is now on display at the Warner Bros. Museum. The "team spent fifteen months and 'several million dollars' on 250 optical effects shots".

== Release ==
The film debuted on VHS in 1982 and was released on LaserDisc in 1983. A DVD release arrived on October 1, 2002, featuring a documentary titled Clint Eastwood – Director, showing the film's premiere in Washington D.C. and reviewing Eastwood's career. Firefox was released in Blu-ray on June 7, 2011.

== Reception ==
U.S. President Ronald Reagan screened Firefox at Camp David in 1982. In his diary entry for June 18 of that year, Reagan called the film "darn good" and applauded it as "a one man job—act, direct, produce". A number of critics, however, were less enthusiastic about Firefox. Author Howard Hughes gave the film a negative review, saying: "Watch the trailer, read the book, play the game – just avoid the film, it's another Eiger Sanction. Less a 'Firefox', it's more of a damp squib, or at best a smoldering turkey." Vincent Canby's review in The New York Times made a similar assessment, zeroing in on Eastwood's lack of control over the plot line: "Firefox is only slightly more suspenseful than it is plausible. It's a James Bond movie without girls, a Superman movie without a sense of humor."

However, Roger Ebert gave the film three-and-a-half stars out of four, praising its special effects and describing it as "a slick, muscular thriller that combines espionage with science fiction", also saying that the "movie works like a well-crafted machine". Ebert identified "one sensational chase sequence", where Soviet pilot Voskov chases Eastwood in a "crevice between two ice cliffs", as a "homage" to Star Wars. Todd McCarthy of Variety panned the film as "a burn-out. Lethargic, characterless and, at 137 minutes, at least a half-hour too long." Gene Siskel of the Chicago Tribune gave the film two-and-a-half stars out of four and wrote that it was "generally entertaining", but "would be a lot more so if Eastwood, who served as producer-director, had excised some of the laborious buildup to the final shootout. Instead, we are asked to sit through some boring patches in which he avoids detection by Russian security officers, who seem to speak Russian or English whenever they like. What's uninteresting about all of this is that we know that Clint is going to make it to the plane. So, let's get on with it."

Sheila Benson of the Los Angeles Times called the film "a sagging, overlong disappointment, talky and slow to ignite. It is the first time that Eastwood the director has served Eastwood the actor-icon so badly, and it is unnerving." Gary Arnold of The Washington Post wrote: "Both loyal fans and neutral observers may agree that Eastwood has steered himself into a peculiarly murky flight path on this occasion", calling the plot "far-fetched" and expressing disappointment that "the Firefox doesn't look all that formidable on the screen... The only in-flight special effect that stirs the imagination is the parallel curtains of water that suddenly erupt in the wake of the plane as it whooshes across the ocean." As of August 2023, the review aggregation website Rotten Tomatoes gives the film a score of 41% based on reviews from 17 critics with a mean of 5.1 of a possible 10.

=== Re-evaluation ===
Several recent assessments of the film have been positive. Writing in 2024, Lloyd Farley of Collider called the film a "touchstone moment" in Eastwood's career, as it "marks the first time we see an Eastwood character with weaknesses". While Eastwood had previously "played characters who were unstoppable, steely, cool heroes and anti-heroes", Mitchell Gant "is crippled at inopportune times by PTSD flashbacks and an overwhelming sense of anxiety that it's all going to come crashing down around him". Farley wrote that Eastwood's role in the film "laid down the building brick that would elevate his performance as the tortured William Munny in Unforgiven" and his performance as Frank Horrigan in In the Line of Fire. While judging the film as "one of Eastwood's lower lights", Farley argued that it "certainly deserves better".

David Grove of MovieWeb wrote in 2024 that while the film's "expansive budget was antithetical to Eastwood’s core efficiency, the result was a spectacular piece of entertainment". Grove called the espionage scenes "effectively staged" and the flying scenes a "thrilling final 45 minutes". As the only time that Eastwood "ventured into science fiction" and the "only Eastwood starring vehicle to rely heavily on special visual effects", Grove stated that the film "represents an anomaly in his career", and applauded Eastwood's "willingness to subvert his iconic screen persona".

In a 2004 article paired with the PBS American Masters episode on Clint Eastwood, critic David Kehr described Firefox as "one of Eastwood’s most personal" films and a work that is "structured as a series of exclusions and escapes". Kehr wrote that "Gant is slowly stripped of the few elements of social identity he possesses: sent to the Soviet Union ... he is first asked to assume the disguise of an American businessman, then as a Russian worker, and finally as the Soviet fighter pilot." Gant is an "isolated" man and a notable example "of Eastwood’s many loners" who lives "in seclusion in the wilderness, haunted by his war experiences". Kehr observed that the film ends unexpectedly: "In the final shot, Gant ... flies away into the distance. Eastwood does not give us the expected triumphant climax", yet nonetheless, by defeating the other Firefox prototype and its pilot, Gant "met and destroyed his double, and in the process, liberated himself". Rather than "the plane landing and Gant being applauded by his peers", Kehr argued that the film's "triumph" lies instead "in Gant’s final evaporation", as he overcomes his "nightmarish" memory of the Vietnam War and flies away, gaining "liberation from himself".

== Academic study ==
In 1982, Allen E. Fuhs, aeronautics professor at the U.S. Naval Postgraduate School, analyzed the Firefox's design and radar cross section (RCS) in lecture notes he prepared while on sabbatical at the NASA Ames Research Center. Fuhs discussed how stealthy the plane would be, using it as "an example of estimating RCS for an aircraft". Among other calculations, he stated the radar cross section of all four engine inlets to be 57 dBsm. (Note: Radar Cross Section (RCS) is often measured in dBsm, meaning "decibels relative to one square meter")

In the May 2023 issue of Proceedings, published by the U.S. Naval Institute, Lt. Cmdr. Mark Wess discussed Firefox in his article "Brain-Machine Interface—the New ‘BMI’", comparing the thought-control helmet used aboard the plane to present-day brain–computer interface developments. Wess commented that the "brain–machine interface (BMI), which may have seemed outlandish in 1982, is a good example of how science fiction can be prophetic: Prototype BMIs are a reality today".

== Video game ==
A laserdisc arcade game based on the movie, also titled Firefox, was released by Atari in 1984.

== See also ==
- List of American films of 1982
- Defection of Viktor Belenko

== Bibliography ==
- Carlson, Mark. Flying on Film: A Century of Aviation in the Movies, 1912–2012. Duncan, Oklahoma: BearManor Media, 2012. ISBN 978-1-59393-219-0.
- Culhane, John. Special Effects in the Movies: How They Do It. New York: Ballantine Books, 1981. ISBN 0-345-28606-5.
- Hardwick, Jack and Ed Schnepf. "A Viewer's Guide to Aviation Movies". The Making of the Great Aviation Films, General Aviation Series, Volume 2, 1989.
- Hughes, Howard. Aim for the Heart. London: I.B. Tauris, 2009. ISBN 978-1-84511-902-7.
- Munn, Michael. Clint Eastwood: Hollywood's Loner. London: Robson Books, 1992. ISBN 0-86051-790-X.
- Schickel, Richard. Clint Eastwood: A Biography. New York: Knopf, 1996. ISBN 978-0-679-74991-2.
- Thomas, Craig. Firefox. New York: Holt Rinehart and Winston, 1977. ISBN 0-03-020791-6.
- Thomas, Walter. "Filming Firefox". Air Classics, Vol. 44, No. 9, September 1982.
