= Dan Pinchbeck =

British writer and video game developer

Dan Pinchbeck is British author, scriptwriter, and game developer. He is best known as co-creator of the video games Dear Esther and Everybody's Gone to the Rapture. Both games were nominated for several British Academy Games Awards (BAFTA) awards with Everybody's Gone to the Rapture winning three along with winning the Writers' Guild of Great Britain Best Writing in a Videogame award. He is the co-founder of the British video game development studio The Chinese Room where he was creative director until 2023.

== Career ==
Pinchbeck started making games whilst undertaking a PhD and working as a lecturer at the University of Portsmouth. After receiving a grant from the Arts & Humanities Research Council., he led a team that made a series of experimental game mods exploring different aspects of game design. Pinchbeck worked closely with the composer Jessica Curry on the development of the mods, which were released for free on the Moddb website. One of the mods, Dear Esther, was a breakout, if controversial, hit that has gone on to be a frequently cited title in conversations about the definition of games and the relationship between games and art..

In 2009, Pinchbeck and Curry were approached by game artist Robert Briscoe about creating a commercial version of Dear Esther. They secured investment from the US backer Indie Fund and the game was launched in 2012, paying back its investment in less than six hours. The game was an overnight cult hit. In his review for The Telegraph, Tom Hoggins described it as "oil painting, poetry, eulogy and video game all at once". For IGN, Keza MacDonald noted that "Dear Esther doesn't need puzzles or mechanics to draw you in. The strength of the writing and the world alone is enough", praising the writing's depth: "I can't give away anything of Dear Esther's story and premise without spoiling it, but it's layered enough to support multiple playthroughs. The writing is dense with intertextual references, most of them biblical, and there are clues and allusions in the narrator's musings that you won't notice the first time you play through.". She concluded that "Dear Esther can change your perspective on what games could be doing.". Dear Esther "is generally regarded as kick-starting the walking simulator sub-genre." It won an IndieCade award in 2012 for Best World/Story and was nominated for five British Academy Games Awards (BATFA).

At that point, under the brand name The Chinese Room, the development team had begun working on a sequel to Frictional Games' Amnesia: The Dark Descent.. The game, Amnesia: A Machine for Pigs was released in 2013. Pinchbeck stated that his aim with the game was to create a horror without simple morality and strong thematic links to 20th Century history.

In his review of the game, Kirk Hamilton stated "Writer Dan Pinchbeck has stitched together literary influences both obvious and surprising, and the result is a wonderfully macabre indictment of the industrial revolution: Upton Sinclair‘s The Jungle meets H.G. Wells’ The Island of Doctor Moreau.” The New York Times stated, "The game's writer, Dan Pinchbeck, is colorful and creative in the cruelty he describes"

By the time of Amnesia: A Machine for Pigs release, The Chinese Room were working on a prototype for the openworld game Everybody's Gone to the Rapture. The story was inspired in part by Pinchbeck's experience of the Great storm of 1987 while growing up in a small village during the Cold War. In their review of the game, The Washington Post credited his "moxie" as creative director in helping The Chinese Room become a "vanguard in the industry."

Everybody's Gone to the Rapture was released in 2015 and was a critical and commercial hit with Pinchbeck's writing frequently cited as major factor in its success.In his review for IGN, Marty Sliva wrote "For a span of five hours, Everybody’s Gone to the Rapture transported me to one of the most detailed, fully realized worlds I’ve ever experienced in a video game. Even the most earth shattering of these revelations are presented in a way that’s painfully melancholy, but I wholly appreciated that Rapture made me actually feel connected to these characters and this place in a way that stirred something in me, which is a task not very many video game stories have managed to accomplish.". Andy Kelly in PC Gamer picked up on the deliberate literary skew of the story, writing that "Apocalyptic fiction rarely focuses on how normal, everyday people would cope when faced with the end of the world, which makes Rapture’s story all the more powerful. I couldn’t help but see myself and my loved ones in the people living in the valley, which gave it an extra resonance".. The game went on to win 3 BAFTAs,and was nominated for another seven, including Best Story. The BAFTA-winning score by studio co-founder and composer Jessica Curry was also singled out as critical to the game's success, with Pinchbeck writing the lyrics to the original songs.

During this period, Dear Esther was also ported to console with the publisher Curve Digital.

Following the release of the mobile VR title So Let Us Melt in 2017, The Chinese Room became a subsidiary studio of Sumo Digital. Pinchbeck led the studio through acquisition and the development of 2020's Little Orpheus. The game saw Pinchbeck expand his writing and directing into comedy and once again, this was picked out as a central plank in the game's success. In Eurogamer, Vikki Blake called it "a captivating yarn, and a glorious adventure to boot" and Thomas Hughes in The Sixth Axis described the game as setting "a new bar in mobile gaming experiences" with "Its rich, lush world is only surpassed by the fantastic narrative and voice acting".. Writing for Switch Player, Joe Westcott said "It really is the story that makes Little Orpheus as enjoyable as it is... The juxtaposition between the fumbling, bumbling Ivan and the stoic General doesn’t portray a pairing that inspires anything new, but the writing is so sharp that the story feels fresh regardless. Unlikely relationships such as theirs have been mined for every shred of comedy they’re worth for years, so for me to still find enjoyment and laughter in what could have been a very stale scenario speaks to the strength of both the writing and the acting.". In 2021, Little Orpheus won an Apple Design award for Delight & Fun, citing it's "excellent storytelling".

Pinchbeck's last game for The Chinese Room was the original horror title Still Wakes the Deep. Pitched as "The Thing Meets Boys From the Black Stuff on an oil rig. Oil Rig sinks", Still Wakes the Deep saw Pinchbeck return to the blend of social drama and horror of Machine for Pigs and Everybody's Gone to the Rapture. James Stephanie Sterling described it as "an impeccable horror production, a gorgeously sickening nightmare in a rarely used setting propelled by stellar acting and sublimely nasty body horror. It’s more than just “The Thing on an oil rig,” though it makes good on that elevator pitch too. It's going to remain with me for a long time. A true genre classic.". It went on to win 3 BAFTAs for Best New Intellectual Property and Best Performer wins for Alec Newman and Karen Dunbar.

In 2023, Pinchbeck stepped down as co-studio head and creative director of The Chinese Room. Since leaving the games industry, Pinchbeck has focused on being a full-time writer.

== Academic Work ==
Prior to starting The Chinese Room, Pinchbeck was a Reader in Computer Games at the University of Portsmouth where he lectured and researched game design and game narrative.

In 2009, Pinchbeck completed his PhD, entitled Story as a function of gameplay in First Person Shooters and an analysis of FPS diegetic content 1998-2007.

He is the author of Doom: ScaryDarkFast, an academic analysis of the 1993 video game Doom.

== Awards ==
Pinchbeck's games have been nominated for 23 BAFTAs and won 6. Other notable awards include 2 Apple Design Award nominations and 1 win, 4 DICE nominations , 4 Develop awards, 8 TIGA awards, an IGF award and nominations and wins at GDC Choice, South by South West (SXSW), Golden Joystick and NAVGTR

=== Selected BAFTA Awards ===
Year	Nominee / work	Award	Result	Ref.
2013	Dear Esther	Best Debut Game	Nominated	
2013	Dear Esther	Best British Game	Nominated	
2013	Dear Esther	Artistic Achievement	Nominated	
2013	Dear Esther	Audio Achievement	Nominated	
2016	Everybody's Gone to the Rapture	Audio Achievement	Won	
2016	Everybody's Gone to the Rapture	Music	Won	
2016	Everybody's Gone to the Rapture	Best British Game	Nominated	
2016	Everybody's Gone to the Rapture	Best Game	Nominated	
2016	Everybody's Gone to the Rapture	Original Property	Nominated	
2016	Everybody's Gone to the Rapture	Story	Nominated	
2016	Everybody's Gone to the Rapture	Artistic Achievement	Nominated	
2016	Still Wakes the Deep	New IP	Won	
2016	Still Wakes the Deep	Narrative	Nominated	
2016	Still Wakes the Deep	British Game	Nominated	

=== Writer's Guild of Great Britain Awards ===
Year	Nominee / work	Award	Result	Ref.
2013	Amnesia: A Machine for Pigs	Best Writing in a Videogame	Nominated	
2015	Everybody's Gone to the Rapture	Best Writing in a Videogame	Won	

== Works ==
Video games
Year	Title
2008	Dear Esther
2009	Korsakovia
2013	Amnesia: A Machine for Pigs
2015	Everybody's Gone to the Rapture
2017	So Let Us Melt
2020	Little Orpheus
2024	Still Wakes The Deep
2025	Vampire: The Masquerade - Bloodlines 2
