= British Academy Games Award for Artistic Achievement =

Video game award

- Awarded for: The best visual art in a game.
- Country: United Kingdom
- Presented by: British Academy of Film and Television Arts
- Currently held by: Death Stranding 2: On the Beach
- Website: www.bafta.org/games

The British Academy Video Games Award for Artistic Achievement is an award presented annually by the British Academy of Film and Television Arts (BAFTA). It is given "for demonstrating exceptional visual art across all genres".

The award was first presented at the 2nd British Academy Games Awards in 2005 to Half-Life 2 under the name Art Direction. The following year it was awarded as Artistic Achievement and has been presented under that name ever since. As developers, Ubisoft Montreal hold the record for most nominations, with seven, as well as most nominations without a win. Media Molecule and Thatgamecompany are the only developers to have won the category twice. The most nominated publisher is Sony Interactive Entertainment, who has thirty-five and seven wins. Electronic Arts and Xbox Game Studios are tied for most nominations without a win, with seven.

The current holder of the award is Death Stranding 2: On the Beach by Kojima Productions, published by Sony Interactive Entertainment which won at the 22nd British Academy Games Awards in 2026.

== Winners and nominees ==
In the following table, the years are listed as per BAFTA convention, and generally correspond to the year of game release in the United Kingdom.

Table key
Indicates the winner

Year	Game	Recipient(s)	Developer(s)	Publisher(s)	Ref.
2003/04 (2nd)	Half-Life 2		Valve		
2003/04 (2nd)	Burnout 3: Takedown		Criterion Games	Electronic Arts	
2003/04 (2nd)	Doom 3		id Software	Activision	
2003/04 (2nd)	Killzone		Guerrilla Games	Sony Computer Entertainment	
2003/04 (2nd)	Onimusha 3: Demon Siege		Capcom		
2003/04 (2nd)	Prince of Persia: Warrior Within		Ubisoft Montreal	Ubisoft	
2005/06 (3rd)	Shadow of the Colossus		Team Ico and Japan Studio	Sony Computer Entertainment	
2005/06 (3rd)	Black		Criterion Games	Electronic Arts	
2005/06 (3rd)	Hitman: Blood Money		IO Interactive	Eidos Interactive	
2005/06 (3rd)	LocoRoco		Japan Studio	Sony Computer Entertainment	
2005/06 (3rd)	The Elder Scrolls IV: Oblivion		Bethesda Game Studios	Bethesda Softworks	
2005/06 (3rd)	We Love Katamari		Namco		
2006/07 (4th)	Ōkami	Atsushi Inaba	Clover Studio	Capcom	
2006/07 (4th)	BioShock		2K Boston and 2K Australia	2K Games	
2006/07 (4th)	Heavenly Sword		Ninja Theory	Sony Computer Entertainment	
2006/07 (4th)	Ratchet & Clank: Tools of Destruction		Insomniac Games	Sony Computer Entertainment	
2006/07 (4th)	Skate		EA Black Box	Electronic Arts	
2006/07 (4th)	Viva Piñata	Ryan Stevenson, Ed Bryan	Rare	Microsoft Game Studios	
2007/08 (5th)	LittleBigPlanet	Kareem Ettouney, Mark Healey, Leo Cubbin	Media Molecule	Sony Computer Entertainment	
2007/08 (5th)	Assassin's Creed	Jade Raymond, Patrice Desilets, Claude Langlais	Ubisoft Montreal	Ubisoft	
2007/08 (5th)	Call of Duty 4: Modern Warfare		Infinity Ward	Activision	
2007/08 (5th)	Dead Space		Visceral Games	Electronic Arts	
2007/08 (5th)	Gears of War 2		Epic Games	Microsoft Game Studios	
2007/08 (5th)	Metal Gear Solid 4: Guns of the Patriots	Yoji Shinkawa	Konami		
2009 (6th)	Flower		thatgamecompany	Sony Computer Entertainment	
2009 (6th)	Assassin's Creed II	Sebastien Puel, Patrice Desilets	Ubisoft Montreal	Ubisoft	
2009 (6th)	Batman: Arkham Asylum		Rocksteady Studios	Eidos Interactive and Warner Bros. Interactive Entertainment	
2009 (6th)	Call of Duty: Modern Warfare 2		Infinity Ward	Activision	
2009 (6th)	Street Fighter IV	Yoshinori Ono	Dimps and Capcom	Capcom	
2009 (6th)	Uncharted 2: Among Thieves		Naughty Dog	Sony Computer Entertainment	
2010 (7th)	God of War III	Stig Asmussen, Ken Feldman, Cecil Kim	Santa Monica Studio	Sony Computer Entertainment	
2010 (7th)	Assassin's Creed: Brotherhood	Mohamed Gambouz	Ubisoft Montreal	Ubisoft	
2010 (7th)	Call of Duty: Black Ops	Colin Whitney, Brian Anderson, Dominique Drozdz	Treyarch	Activision	
2010 (7th)	Heavy Rain	David Cage, Guillaume de Fondaumiere, Scott Johnson	Quantic Dream	Sony Computer Entertainment	
2010 (7th)	Limbo	Arnt Jensen, Morten Bramsen	Playdead	Microsoft Game Studios	
2010 (7th)	Mass Effect 2		BioWare	Electronic Arts	
2011 (8th)	Rayman Origins	Michel Ancel, Celine Tellier, Christophe Villez	Ubisoft		
2011 (8th)	Batman: Arkham City		Rocksteady Studios	Warner Bros. Interactive Entertainment	
2011 (8th)	L.A. Noire	Ben Brudenell, Cheekin Chan, Simon Wood	Team Bondi	Rockstar Games	
2011 (8th)	LittleBigPlanet 2		Media Molecule	Sony Computer Entertainment	
2011 (8th)	Uncharted 3: Drake's Deception		Naughty Dog	Sony Computer Entertainment	
2011 (8th)	The Elder Scrolls V: Skyrim	Todd Howard	Bethesda Game Studios	Bethesda Softworks	
2012 (9th)	Journey		thatgamecompany	Sony Computer Entertainment	
2012 (9th)	The Room		Fireproof Games		
2012 (9th)	Halo 4		343 Industries	Microsoft Game Studios	
2012 (9th)	Dear Esther	Robert Briscoe	The Chinese Room		
2012 (9th)	Borderlands 2	Randy Pitchford, Paul Hellquist, Jeramy Cooke	Gearbox Software	2K Games	
2012 (9th)	Far Cry 3	Jean-Alexis Doyon, Genseki Tanaka, Vincent Jean	Ubisoft Montreal	Ubisoft	
2013 (10th)	Tearaway		Tarsier Studios and Media Molecule	Sony Computer Entertainment Europe	
2013 (10th)	BioShock Infinite	Scott Sinclair, Shawn Robertson, Stephen Alexander	Irrational Games	2K Games	
2013 (10th)	Beyond: Two Souls	John Rostron, David Cage, Guillaume De Fondaumiere	Quantic Dream	Sony Computer Entertainment	
2013 (10th)	The Last of Us		Naughty Dog	Sony Computer Entertainment	
2013 (10th)	Device 6		Simogo		
2013 (10th)	Ni no Kuni: Wrath of the White Witch	Yoshiyuki Momose	Level-5	Bandai Namco Games	
2014 (11th)	Lumino City		State of Play Games		
2014 (11th)	Assassin's Creed Unity	Mohamed Gambouz, Patrick Limoges, Jean-Sébastien Guay	Ubisoft Montréal	Ubisoft	
2014 (11th)	Far Cry 4	Jean-Alexis Doyon, David Wilkinson, Scott Mitchell	Ubisoft Montréal	Ubisoft	
2014 (11th)	Valiant Hearts: The Great War	Paul Tumelaire, Ghislain Avrillon, Laurent Labouille	Ubisoft Montpellier	Ubisoft	
2014 (11th)	Hohokum		Honeyslug and Santa Monica Studio	Sony Computer Entertainment Europe	
2014 (11th)	Monument Valley		ustwo Games		
2015 (12th)	Ori and the Blind Forest		Moon Studios	Microsoft Studios	
2015 (12th)	Assassin's Creed Syndicate		Ubisoft Quebec	Ubisoft	
2015 (12th)	Batman: Arkham Knight		Rocksteady Studios	Warner Bros. Interactive Entertainment	
2015 (12th)	Everybody's Gone to the Rapture		The Chinese Room and Santa Monica Studio	Sony Computer Entertainment	
2015 (12th)	Metal Gear Solid V: The Phantom Pain		Kojima Productions	Konami Digital Entertainment	
2015 (12th)	The Witcher 3: Wild Hunt		CD Projekt Red	CD Projekt	
2016 (13th)	Inside		Playdead		
2016 (13th)	Abzû		Giant Squid Studios	505 Games	
2016 (13th)	Dishonored 2		Arkane Studios	Bethesda Softworks	
2016 (13th)	The Last Guardian		Japan Studio	Sony Interactive Entertainment	
2016 (13th)	Uncharted 4: A Thief's End		Naughty Dog	Sony Interactive Entertainment	
2016 (13th)	Unravel		Coldwood Interactive	Electronic Arts	
2017 (14th)	Hellblade: Senua's Sacrifice		Ninja Theory		
2017 (14th)	Cuphead		StudioMDHR Entertainment		
2017 (14th)	Gorogoa		Jason Roberts	Annapurna Interactive	
2017 (14th)	Horizon Zero Dawn		Guerrilla Games	Sony Interactive Entertainment Europe	
2017 (14th)	Uncharted: The Lost Legacy		Naughty Dog	Sony Interactive Entertainment Europe	
2017 (14th)	The Legend of Zelda: Breath of the Wild		Nintendo EPD	Nintendo	
2018 (15th)	Return of the Obra Dinn	Lucas Pope	Lucas Pope	3909	
2018 (15th)	Detroit: Become Human	Guillaume de Fondaumière, David Cage, John OBrien	Quantic Dream	Sony Interactive Entertainment	
2018 (15th)	God of War		Santa Monica Studio	Sony Interactive Entertainment	
2018 (15th)	Marvel's Spider-Man		Insomniac Games	Sony Interactive Entertainment	
2018 (15th)	Gris		Nomada Studio	Devolver Digital	
2018 (15th)	Red Dead Redemption 2		Rockstar Games		
2019 (16th)	Sayonara Wild Hearts		Simogo	Annapurna Interactive	
2019 (16th)	Concrete Genie		Pixelopus	Sony Interactive Entertainment	
2019 (16th)	Death Stranding		Kojima Productions	Sony Interactive Entertainment	
2019 (16th)	Control		Remedy Entertainment	505 Games	
2019 (16th)	Disco Elysium		ZA/UM		
2019 (16th)	Knights and Bikes	Rex Crowle, Moo Yu, Kenneth C M Young	Foam Sword	Double Fine Presents	
2020 (17th)	Hades	Jen Zee	Supergiant Games		
2020 (17th)	Cyberpunk 2077		CD Projekt Red	CD Projekt	
2020 (17th)	Dreams		Media Molecule	Sony Interactive Entertainment	
2020 (17th)	The Last of Us Part II		Naughty Dog	Sony Interactive Entertainment	
2020 (17th)	Ghost of Tsushima	Jason Connell, Joanna Wang, Ian Jun Wei Chiew	Sucker Punch Productions	Sony Interactive Entertainment	
2020 (17th)	Half-Life: Alyx		Valve Corporation		
2021 (18th)	The Artful Escape		Beethoven & Dinosaur	Annapurna Interactive	
2021 (18th)	It Takes Two		Hazelight Studios	Electronic Arts	
2021 (18th)	Psychonauts 2		Double Fine	Xbox Game Studios	
2021 (18th)	Ratchet & Clank: Rift Apart		Insomniac Games	Sony Interactive Entertainment	
2021 (18th)	Returnal		Housemarque	Sony Interactive Entertainment	
2021 (18th)	Resident Evil Village		Capcom		
2022 (19th)	Tunic		Finji		
2022 (19th)	Elden Ring		FromSoftware	Bandai Namco	
2022 (19th)	God of War Ragnarök	Raf Grassetti, Dan McKim, Eric Valdes	Santa Monica	Sony Interactive Entertainment	
2022 (19th)	Immortality	Doug Potts, Stephanie Reese, Kerry Hennessy	Half Mermaid Productions		
2022 (19th)	Pentiment	Hannah Kennedy, Soojin Paek	Obsidian	Xbox Game Studios	
2022 (19th)	A Plague Tale: Requiem		Asobo	Focus	
2023 (20th)	Alan Wake 2		Remedy Entertainment	Epic Games	
2023 (20th)	Baldur's Gate 3		Larian Studios		
2023 (20th)	Cocoon		Geometric Interactive	Annapurna Interactive	
2023 (20th)	Diablo IV		Blizzard Entertainment		
2023 (20th)	Final Fantasy XVI		Square Enix		
2023 (20th)	Hi-Fi Rush		Tango Gameworks	Bethesda Softworks	
2024 (21st)	Neva		Nomada Studios	Devolver Digital	
2024 (21st)	Astro Bot		Team Asobi	Sony Interactive Entertainment	
2024 (21st)	Black Myth: Wukong		Game Science		
2024 (21st)	Harold Halibut	Ole Tillmann, Fabian Preuschoff, Onat Hekimoglu	Slow Bros.		
2024 (21st)	Senua's Saga: Hellblade II		Ninja Theory	Xbox Game Studios	
2024 (21st)	Still Wakes the Deep		The Chinese Room	Secret Mode	
2025 (22nd)	Death Stranding 2: On the Beach	Hideo Kojima, Yoji Shinkawa, Megan Tuckwell	Kojima Productions	Sony Interactive Entertainment	
2025 (22nd)	Clair Obscur: Expedition 33		Sandfall Interactive	Kepler Interactive	
2025 (22nd)	Dispatch	Derek Stratton	AdHoc Studio		
2025 (22nd)	Ghost of Yōtei		Sucker Punch Productions	Sony Interactive Entertainment	
2025 (22nd)	Hollow Knight: Silksong		Team Cherry		
2025 (22nd)	South of Midnight		Compulsion Games	Xbox Game Studios	

- Note: The games that don't have recipients on the table had Development Team credited on the awards page.

== Multiple nominations and wins ==
=== Developers ===
Developer	Nominations	Wins
Ubisoft Montreal	7	0
Naughty Dog	6	0
Santa Monica Studio	5	1
Media Molecule	4	2
Capcom	3	0
Insomniac Games	3	0
Japan Studio	3	0
Quantic Dream	3	0
Rocksteady Studios	3	0
Bethesda Game Studios	2	0
CD Projekt RED	2	0
Criterion Games	2	0
Guerrilla Games	2	0
Infinity Ward	2	0
Kojima Productions	2	0
Ninja Theory	2	1
Playdead	2	1
Remedy Entertainment	2	1
Simogo	2	1
Thatgamecompany	2	2
The Chinese Room	2	0
Valve	2	0

=== Publishers ===
Publisher	Nominations	Wins
Sony Computer/Interactive Entertainment	33	6
Ubisoft	9	1
Electronic Arts	7	0
Microsoft/Xbox Game Studios	7	0
Activision	4	0
Annapurna Interactive	4	2
Bethesda Softworks	4	0
Capcom	4	1
2k Games	3	0
Bandai Namco Games	3	0
Bethesda Softworks	4	0
Warner Bros Interactive	3	0
505 Games	2	0
CD Projekt	2	0
Eidos Interactive	2	0
Konami	2	0
Valve	2	0
