= British Academy Games Award for Audio Achievement =

Annual video game award

- Awarded for: The best design and application of sound, dialogue and music for a video game.
- Country: United Kingdom
- Presented by: British Academy of Film and Television Arts
- Currently held by: Dispatch
- Website: www.bafta.org/games

The British Academy Video Games Award for Audio Achievement is an award presented annually by the British Academy of Film and Television Arts (BAFTA). It is given in honor to "excellence in the design and application of sound, dialogue and music to create an exceptional audio experience".

The award was first presented at the 1st British Academy Games Awards in 2004 to Grand Theft Auto: Vice City under the name Sound. Since then, it has gone through several name changes, going by Audio Achievement at the 2nd British Academy Games Awards, Audio at the 3rd British Academy Games Awards and Use of Audio from the 3rd to the 7th British Academy Games Awards. The category returned to Audio Achievement at the 8th British Academy Games Awards and has been handed out under that name ever since.

As developers, EA DICE hold the record for most nominations in this category, with seven, while Santa Monica Studio has the most wins, with three. Sledgehammer is the developer with the most nominations without a win, with five. Sony Interactive Entertainment is the publisher with the most nominations, with twenty eight and have a leading nine wins in the category. Xbox Game Studios have the most nominations without a win, with six.

The current holder of the award is Dispatch by AdHoc Studio, which won at the 22nd British Academy Games Awards in 2026.

== Winners and nominees ==
In the following table, the years are listed as per BAFTA convention, and generally correspond to the year of game release in the United Kingdom.

Table key
Indicates the winner

Year	Game	Recipient(s)	Developer(s)	Publisher(s)	Ref.
2002/03 (1st)	Grand Theft Auto: Vice City		Rockstar North	Rockstar Games	
2002/03 (1st)	Amplitude		Harmonix	Sony Computer Entertainment	
2002/03 (1st)	Command & Conquer: Generals		EA Pacific	EA Games	
2002/03 (1st)	Harry Potter and the Chamber of Secrets		EA UK	Electronic Arts	
2002/03 (1st)	Metroid Prime		Retro Studios and Nintendo	Nintendo	
2002/03 (1st)	TimeSplitters 2		Free Radical Design	Eidos Interactive	
2003/04 (2nd)	Call of Duty: Finest Hour		Spark Unlimited	Activision	
2003/04 (2nd)	DJ Decks & FX: House Edition		Relentless Software	Sony Computer Entertainment	
2003/04 (2nd)	SingStar / SingStar Party		London Studio	Sony Computer Entertainment	
2003/04 (2nd)	Doom 3		id Software	Activision	
2003/04 (2nd)	Forgotten Realms: Demon Stone		Stormfront Studios and Zono	Atari	
2003/04 (2nd)	Manhunt		Rockstar North	Rockstar Games	
2005/06 (3rd)	Electroplankton		indieszero	Nintendo	
2005/06 (3rd)	Black		Criterion Games	Electronic Arts	
2005/06 (3rd)	LocoRoco		Japan Studio	Sony Computer Entertainment	
2005/06 (3rd)	Tom Clancy's Ghost Recon Advanced Warfighter		Ubisoft Paris	Ubisoft	
2005/06 (3rd)	Tomb Raider: Legend		Crystal Dynamics	Eidos Interactive	
2005/06 (3rd)	We Love Katamari		Namco		
2006/07 (4th)	Crackdown		Realtime Worlds	Microsoft Game Studios	
2006/07 (4th)	Elite Beat Agents		iNiS	Nintendo	
2006/07 (4th)	Gears of War	Mike Larson, Lee Perry, Desmond Rogers	Epic Games	Microsoft Game Studios	
2006/07 (4th)	God of War II	Dave Murrant, Philip Kovats, Chuck Russom	Santa Monica Studio	Sony Computer Entertainment	
2006/07 (4th)	Guitar Hero II		Harmonix	Activision	
2006/07 (4th)	Skate		EA Black Box	Electronic Arts	
2007/08 (5th)	Dead Space	Don Veca	Visceral Games	Electronic Arts	
2007/08 (5th)	Call of Duty 4: Modern Warfare		Infinity Ward	Activision	
2007/08 (5th)	Gears of War 2		Epic Games	Microsoft Game Studios	
2007/08 (5th)	Grand Theft Auto IV		Rockstar North	Rockstar Games	
2007/08 (5th)	LittleBigPlanet	Kenneth Young, Mark Healey, Leo Cubbin	Media Molecule	Sony Computer Entertainment	
2007/08 (5th)	Super Mario Galaxy		Nintendo EAD Tokyo	Nintendo	
2009 (6th)	Uncharted 2: Among Thieves	Amy Hennig, Bruce Swanson, Greg Edmonson	Naughty Dog	Sony Computer Entertainment	
2009 (6th)	Batman: Arkham Asylum		Rocksteady Studios	Eidos Interactive and Warner Bros. Interactive Entertainment	
2009 (6th)	Call of Duty: Modern Warfare 2		Infinity Ward	Activision	
2009 (6th)	DJ Hero	Jamie Jackson, Dan Neil, Tim Riley	FreeStyleGames and Exient Entertainment	Activision	
2009 (6th)	Flower	Vincent Diamante, Steve Johnson, Jenova Chen	thatgamecompany	Sony Computer Entertainment	
2009 (6th)	Left 4 Dead 2	Gabe Newell, Chet Faliszek, Tom Leonard	Valve		
2010 (7th)	Battlefield: Bad Company 2	Stefan Strandberg	EA DICE	Electronic Arts	
2010 (7th)	Alan Wake		Remedy Entertainment	Microsoft Game Studios	
2010 (7th)	Assassin's Creed: Brotherhood	Mathieu Jeanson	Ubisoft Montreal	Ubisoft	
2010 (7th)	Call of Duty: Black Ops	Brian Tuey, Chris Cowell	Treyarch	Activision	
2010 (7th)	DJ Hero 2		FreeStyleGames	Activision	
2010 (7th)	Limbo	Martin Stig Andersen	Playdead		
2011 (8th)	Battlefield 3	Bence Pajor, Stefan Strandberg, Carl Vikman	EA DICE	Electronic Arts	
2011 (8th)	Batman: Arkham City		Rocksteady Studios	Warner Bros. Interactive Entertainment	
2011 (8th)	Call of Duty: Modern Warfare 3		Infinity Ward and Sledgehammer Games	Activision	
2011 (8th)	Uncharted 3: Drake's Deception		Naughty Dog	Sony Computer Entertainment	
2011 (8th)	Dead Space 2	Andrew Boyd, Steve Papoutsis, J White	Visceral Games	Electronic Arts	
2011 (8th)	The Nightjar		Somethin' Else		
2012 (9th)	Journey	Steve Johnson, Austin Wintory, Keith Leary	thatgamecompany	Sony Computer Entertainment	
2012 (9th)	Far Cry 3	Dan Hay, Tony Gronick, Brian Tyler	Ubisoft Montreal	Ubisoft	
2012 (9th)	Assassin's Creed III	Mathieu Jeanson	Ubisoft Montreal	Ubisoft	
2012 (9th)	Beat Sneak Bandit	Simon Flesser, Magnus "Gordon" Gardebäck	Simogo		
2012 (9th)	Halo 4		343 Industries	Microsoft Game Studios	
2012 (9th)	Dear Esther	Jessica Curry	The Chinese Room		
2013 (10th)	The Last of Us		Naughty Dog	Sony Computer Entertainment	
2013 (10th)	Battlefield 4		EA DICE	Electronic Arts	
2013 (10th)	BioShock Infinite	Patrick Balthrop, Scott Haraldsen, James Bonney	Irrational Games	2K Games	
2013 (10th)	Device 6		Simogo		
2013 (10th)	Grand Theft Auto V		Rockstar North	Rockstar Games	
2013 (10th)	Tomb Raider		Crystal Dynamics	Square Enix	
2014 (11th)	Alien: Isolation		The Creative Assembly	Sega	
2014 (11th)	The Banner Saga	Austin Wintory, Michael Theiler, Peret von Sturmer	Stoic	Versus Evil	
2014 (11th)	Call of Duty: Advanced Warfare		Sledgehammer Games	Activision	
2014 (11th)	Fantasia: Music Evolved		Disney Interactive Studios and Harmonix Music Systems	Disney Interactive Studios	
2014 (11th)	Mario Kart 8		Nintendo EAD	Nintendo	
2014 (11th)	The Sailor's Dream		Simogo		
2015 (12th)	Everybody's Gone to the Rapture		The Chinese Room and Santa Monica Studio	Sony Computer Entertainment	
2015 (12th)	Assassin's Creed Syndicate		Ubisoft Quebec	Ubisoft	
2015 (12th)	Batman: Arkham Knight		Rocksteady Studios	Warner Bros. Interactive Entertainment	
2015 (12th)	Metal Gear Solid V: The Phantom Pain		Kojima Productions	Konami Digital Entertainment	
2015 (12th)	Star Wars Battlefront		EA DICE	Electronic Arts	
2015 (12th)	The Witcher 3: Wild Hunt		CD Projekt Red	CD Projekt	
2016 (13th)	The Last Guardian		Japan Studio	Sony Interactive Entertainment	
2016 (13th)	Battlefield 1		EA DICE	Electronic Arts	
2016 (13th)	Doom		id Software	Bethesda Softworks	
2016 (13th)	Inside	Martin Stig Andersen	Playdead		
2016 (13th)	Rez Infinite	Tetsuya Mizuguchi, Takako Ishida, Noboru Mutoh	United Game Artists	Enhance Games	
2016 (13th)	Uncharted 4: A Thief's End		Naughty Dog	Sony Interactive Entertainment	
2017 (14th)	Hellblade: Senua's Sacrifice	David Garcia Diaz	Ninja Theory		
2017 (14th)	Call of Duty: World War II		Sledgehammer Games	Activision	
2017 (14th)	Destiny 2		Bungie	Activision	
2017 (14th)	Horizon Zero Dawn		Guerrilla Games	Sony Interactive Entertainment Europe	
2017 (14th)	Uncharted: The Lost Legacy		Naughty Dog	Sony Interactive Entertainment Europe	
2017 (14th)	Star Wars: Battlefront II		EA DICE	Electronic Arts	
2018 (15th)	God of War	Mike Niederquell, Todd Piperi, Leilani Ramirez	Santa Monica Studio	Sony Interactive Entertainment Europe	
2018 (15th)	Battlefield V		EA Dice	Electronic Arts	
2018 (15th)	Detroit: Become Human	Guillaume de Fondaumière, David Cage, John OBrien	Quantic Dream	Sony Interactive Entertainment Europe	
2018 (15th)	Marvel's Spider-Man	Paul Mudra, Phillip Kovats, Dwight Okahara	Insomniac Games	Sony Interactive Entertainment Europe	
2018 (15th)	Red Dead Redemption 2		Rockstar Games		
2018 (15th)	Tetris Effect	Hydelic, Noboru Mutoh, Takako Ishida	Monstars Inc. and Resonair	Enhance, Inc.	
2019 (16th)	Ape Out	Matt Boch	Gabe Cuzzillo	Devolver Digital	
2019 (16th)	Call of Duty: Modern Warfare		Infinity Ward	Activision	
2019 (16th)	Control		Remedy Entertainment	505 Games	
2019 (16th)	Death Stranding	Ludvig Forssell, Mike Niederquell, Jodie Kupsco	Kojima Productions	Sony Interactive Entertainment	
2019 (16th)	Star Wars Jedi: Fallen Order		Respawn Entertainment	Electronic Arts	
2019 (16th)	Untitled Goose Game		House House	Panic Inc.	
2020 (17th)	Ghost of Tsushima		Sucker Punch Productions	Sony Interactive Entertainment	
2020 (17th)	Hades	Darren Korb	Supergiant Games		
2020 (17th)	Astro's Playroom		Japan Studio	Sony Interactive Entertainment	
2020 (17th)	The Last of Us Part II		Naughty Dog	Sony Interactive Entertainment	
2020 (17th)	Spider-Man: Miles Morales		Insomniac Games	Sony Interactive Entertainment	
2020 (17th)	Half-Life: Alyx		Valve Corporation		
2021 (18th)	Returnal		Housemarque	Sony Interactive Entertainment	
2021 (18th)	The Artful Escape		Beethoven & Dinosaur	Annapurna Interactive	
2021 (18th)	Call of Duty: Vanguard		Sledgehammer Games	Activision	
2021 (18th)	Deathloop		Arkane Studios	Bethesda Softworks	
2021 (18th)	Halo Infinite		343 Industries	Xbox Game Studios	
2021 (18th)	Marvel's Guardians of the Galaxy		Eidos-Montréal	Square Enix	
2022 (19th)	God of War Ragnarök	Jodie Kupsco, Michael Kent, Sean LaValle	Santa Monica	Sony Interactive Entertainment	
2022 (19th)	A Plague Tale: Requiem		Asobo	Focus	
2022 (19th)	Horizon Forbidden West		Guerrilla	Sony Interactive Entertainment	
2022 (19th)	Metal: Hellsinger	Elvira Björkman, Nicklas Hjertberg	The Outsiders	Funcom Oslo	
2022 (19th)	Stray		BlueTwelve	Annapurna Interactive	
2022 (19th)	Tunic		Finji		
2023 (20th)	Alan Wake 2		Remedy Entertainment	Epic Games	
2023 (20th)	Call of Duty: Modern Warfare III		Sledgehammer Games	Activision	
2023 (20th)	Hi-Fi Rush		Tango Gameworks	Bethesda Softworks	
2023 (20th)	The Legend of Zelda: Tears of the Kingdom		Nintendo		
2023 (20th)	Marvel's Spider-Man 2		Insomniac Games	Sony Interactive Entertainment	
2023 (20th)	Star Wars Jedi: Survivor		Respawn Entertainment	Electronic Arts	
2024 (21st)	Astro Bot		Team Asobi	Sony Interactive Entertainment	
2024 (21st)	Animal Well	Billy Basso	Shared Memory	Bigmode	
2024 (21st)	Helldivers 2		Arrowhead Game Studios	Sony Interactive Entertainment	
2024 (21st)	Senua's Saga: Hellblade II		Ninja Theory	Xbox Game Studios	
2024 (21st)	Star Wars Outlaws		Massive Entertainment	Ubisoft	
2024 (21st)	Still Wakes the Deep		The Chinese Room	Secret Mode	
2025 (22nd)	Dispatch		AdHoc Studio		
2025 (22nd)	ARC Raiders	Bence Pajor, Olof Strömqvist, Simon Svanbäck	Embark Studios		
2025 (22nd)	Clair Obscur: Expedition 33		Sandfall Interactive	Kepler Interactive	
2025 (22nd)	Death Stranding 2: On the Beach	Hideo Kojima, Hiroyuki Nakayama, Noburo Masuda	Kojima Productions	Sony Interactive Entertainment	
2025 (22nd)	Ghost of Yōtei		Sucker Punch Productions	Sony Interactive Entertainment	
2025 (22nd)	Indiana Jones and the Great Circle		MachineGames	Bethesda Softworks	

- Note: The games that don't have recipients on the table had Development Team credited on the awards page.

== Multiple nominations and wins ==
=== Developers ===
Developer	Nominations	Wins
EA DICE	7	2
Naughty Dog	6	1
Sledgehammer Games	5	0
Infinity Ward	4	0
Rockstar North	4	1
Santa Monica Studio	4	3
Harmonix	3	0
Insomniac Games	3	0
Japan Studio	3	1
Remedy Entertainment	3	1
Rocksteady Studios	3	0
Simogo	3	0
343 Industries	2	0
Crystal Dynamics	2	0
Epic Games	2	0
FreeStyleGames	2	0
Guerrilla Games	2	0
Id Software	2	0
Kojima Productions	2	0
Nintendo EAD	2	0
Respawn Entertainment	2	0
Thatgamecompany	2	1
The Chinese Room	2	1
Ubisoft Montreal	2	0
Valve	2	0
Visceral Games	2	1

=== Publishers ===
Developer	Nominations	Wins
Sony Computer/Interactive Entertainment	28	9
Activision	15	1
Electronic Arts	14	3
Microsoft/Xbox Game Studios	6	0
Nintendo	6	1
Rockstar Games	5	1
Ubisoft	4	0
Eidos Interactive	3	0
Simogo	3	0
Warner Bros Interactive	3	0
Annapurna Interactive	2	0
Enhance	2	0
Square Enix	2	0
