= British Academy Games Award for Narrative =

Video game award

- Awarded for: The best story or narrative for a game
- Country: United Kingdom
- Presented by: British Academy of Film and Television Arts
- Currently held by: Kingdom Come: Deliverance II
- Website: www.bafta.org/games

The British Academy Video Games Award for Narrative is an award presented annually by the British Academy of Film and Television Arts (BAFTA). It is given to recognize "excellence in the creation and delivery of the best story or narrative that captivates and engages the player". The award is given to the writers/development team, the developer and the publisher of the winning game. The award was first presented at the 3rd British Academy Games Awards under the name Screenplay. The following year it was renamed into Story and Character. From the 6th edition to the 12th, it was presented as Story. Since the 13th British Academy Games Awards, it has been presented with its current name.

Naughty Dog and Santa Monica Studio are the only developers with two wins in the category, while Ubisoft Montreal are the developer with the most nominations without a win, with five. Among publishers, Sony Interactive Entertainment has a leading nineteen nominations, with six wins. Bethesda Softworks, Ubisoft and Electronic Arts are tied for most nominations without a win, with seven each. To date, two writers (Neil Druckmann and Cory Barlog) have won the BAFTA twice for their work on The Last of Us and God of War franchises respectively. With three nominations, Tim Schafer is the most nominated writer without a win.

The current holder of the award is Kingdom Come: Deliverance II by Warhorse Studios and Deep Silver, which won at the 22nd British Academy Games Awards in 2026.

== Winners and nominees ==
In the following table, the years are listed as per BAFTA convention, and generally correspond to the year of game release in the United Kingdom.

Table key
Indicates the winner

Year	Game	Recipient(s)	Developer(s)	Publisher(s)	Ref.
2005/06 (3rd)	Psychonauts		Double Fine Productions	Majesco	
2005/06 (3rd)	24: The Game		SCE Studio Cambridge	Sony Computer Entertainment Europe	
2005/06 (3rd)	Rogue Trooper		Rebellion Developments	Eidos Interactive	
2005/06 (3rd)	Tomb Raider: Legend		Crystal Dynamics	Eidos Interactive	
2005/06 (3rd)	The Elder Scrolls IV: Oblivion		Bethesda Game Studios	Bethesda Softworks	
2005/06 (3rd)	Tom Clancy's Ghost Recon Advanced Warfighter		Ubisoft Paris	Ubisoft	
2006/07 (4th)	God of War II	Cory Barlog, James Barlog and Marianne Krawczyk	Santa Monica Studio	Sony Computer Entertainment	
2006/07 (4th)	Final Fantasy XII	Daisuke Watanabe, Miwa Shoda and Yasumi Matsuno	Square Enix		
2006/07 (4th)	Heavenly Sword	Tameem Antoniades, Rhianna Pratchett and Andrew S. Walsh	Ninja Theory	Sony Computer Entertainment	
2006/07 (4th)	Ōkami	Hideki Kamiya	Clover Studio	Capcom	
2006/07 (4th)	The Darkness	Denby Grace, Lars Johansson, Jerk Gustafsson	Starbreeze Studios	2K Games	
2006/07 (4th)	The Simpsons Game	Matt Selman, Scot Amos	EA Redwood Shores	Electronic Arts	
2007/08 (5th)	Call of Duty 4: Modern Warfare		Infinity Ward	Activision	
2007/08 (5th)	Assassin's Creed	Jade Raymond, Patrice Desilets, Claude Langlais	Ubisoft Montreal	Ubisoft	
2007/08 (5th)	Fable II		Lionhead Studios	Microsoft Game Studios	
2007/08 (5th)	Mass Effect	Casey Hudson, Drew Karpyshyn, Derek Watts	BioWare	Microsoft Game Studios	
2007/08 (5th)	Fallout 3	Todd Howard, Emil Pagliarulo	Bethesda Game Studios	Bethesda Softworks	
2007/08 (5th)	Grand Theft Auto IV		Rockstar North	Rockstar Games	
2009 (6th)	Uncharted 2: Among Thieves		Naughty Dog	Sony Computer Entertainment	
2009 (6th)	Assassin's Creed II	Corey May, Joshua Rubin, Jeffrey Yohalem	Ubisoft Montréal	Ubisoft	
2009 (6th)	Batman: Arkham Asylum		Rocksteady Studios	Eidos Interactive and Warner Bros. Interactive Entertainment	
2009 (6th)	Broken Sword: Shadow of the Templars – The Director's Cut	Charles Cecil, Neil Richards, Tony Warriner	Revolution Software	Ubisoft	
2009 (6th)	Brütal Legend	Tim Schafer	Double Fine Productions	Electronic Arts	
2009 (6th)	Dragon Age: Origins	Ray Muzyka, Greg Zeschuk, Mike Laidlaw	BioWare	Electronic Arts	
2010 (7th)	Heavy Rain	David Cage, Guillaume de Fondaumiere, Scott Johnson	Quantic Dream	Sony Computer Entertainment	
2010 (7th)	Alan Wake		Remedy Entertainment	Microsoft Game Studios	
2010 (7th)	BioShock 2	Jordan Thomas, Zak McClendon	2K Marin	2K Games	
2010 (7th)	Call of Duty: Black Ops	Dave Anthony, Craig Houston	Treyarch	Activision	
2010 (7th)	Fallout: New Vegas	John Gonzalez, Eric Fenstermaker, Travis Stout	Obsidian Entertainment	Bethesda Softworks	
2010 (7th)	Mass Effect 2		BioWare	Electronic Arts	
2011 (8th)	Portal 2		Valve Corporation		
2011 (8th)	Batman: Arkham City		Rocksteady Studios	Warner Bros. Interactive Entertainment	
2011 (8th)	Deus Ex: Human Revolution	Jean-François Dugas, Marie DeMarle, James Swallow	Eidos-Montréal	Square Enix Europe	
2011 (8th)	L.A. Noire	Brendan McNamara	Team Bondi	Rockstar Games	
2011 (8th)	The Elder Scrolls V: Skyrim	Todd Howard	Bethesda Game Studios	Bethesda Softworks	
2011 (8th)	Uncharted 3: Drake's Deception		Naughty Dog	Sony Computer Entertainment	
2012 (9th)	The Walking Dead		Telltale Games		
2012 (9th)	Journey		thatgamecompany	Sony Computer Entertainment	
2012 (9th)	Far Cry 3	Jeffrey Yohalem, Lucien Soulban, Li Kuo	Ubisoft Montréal	Ubisoft	
2012 (9th)	Dishonored		Arkane Studios	Bethesda Softworks	
2012 (9th)	Mass Effect 3	Mac Walters	BioWare	Electronic Arts	
2012 (9th)	Thomas Was Alone	Mike Bithell	Mike Bithell		
2013 (10th)	The Last of Us	Bruce Straley, Neil Druckmann	Naughty Dog	Sony Computer Entertainment	
2013 (10th)	The Stanley Parable		Galactic Cafe		
2013 (10th)	Ni no Kuni: Wrath of the White Witch	Akihiro Hino	Level-5	Namco Bandai Games	
2013 (10th)	Grand Theft Auto V	Dan Houser, Rupert Humphries	Rockstar North	Rockstar Games	
2013 (10th)	Gone Home		Fullbright		
2013 (10th)	Brothers: A Tale of Two Sons		Starbreeze Studios	505 Games	
2014 (11th)	The Last of Us: Left Behind	Neil Druckmann	Naughty Dog	Sony Computer Entertainment Europe	
2014 (11th)	80 Days	Joseph Humfrey, Jon Ingold, Meg Jayanth	Inkle		
2014 (11th)	Broken Age	Tim Schafer	Double Fine Productions		
2014 (11th)	Far Cry 4	Mark Thompson, Lucien Soulban, Li Kuo	Ubisoft Montréal	Ubisoft	
2014 (11th)	The Wolf Among Us		Telltale Games		
2014 (11th)	Never Alone (Kisima Inŋitchuŋa)		Upper One Games	E-Line Media	
2015 (12th)	Life Is Strange		Dontnod Entertainment	Square Enix Europe	
2015 (12th)	Everybody's Gone to the Rapture		The Chinese Room	Sony Computer Entertainment	
2015 (12th)	Until Dawn		Supermassive Games	Sony Computer Entertainment	
2015 (12th)	Her Story	Sam Barlow	Sam Barlow		
2015 (12th)	Undertale		Toby Fox		
2015 (12th)	The Witcher 3: Wild Hunt		CD Projekt Red	CD Projekt	
2016 (13th)	Inside	Arnt Jensen	Playdead		
2016 (13th)	Dishonored 2		Arkane Studios	Bethesda Softworks	
2016 (13th)	Firewatch		Campo Santo	Panic	
2016 (13th)	Mafia III		Hangar 13	2K Games	
2016 (13th)	Oxenfree		Night School Studio		
2016 (13th)	Uncharted 4: A Thief's End	Neil Druckmann, Josh Scherr	Naughty Dog	Sony Interactive Entertainment	
2017 (14th)	Night in the Woods	Scott Benson, Alec Holowka, Bethany Hockenberry	Infinite Fall	Finji	
2017 (14th)	Hellblade: Senua's Sacrifice	Tameem Antoniades	Ninja Theory		
2017 (14th)	Horizon Zero Dawn		Guerrilla Games	Sony Interactive Entertainment	
2017 (14th)	Tacoma	Steve Gaynor, Karla Zimonia	Fullbright		
2017 (14th)	What Remains of Edith Finch		Giant Sparrow	Annapurna Interactive	
2017 (14th)	Wolfenstein II: The New Colossus	Jens Matthies, Tommy Tordsson Björk, Tom Keegan	MachineGames	Bethesda Softworks	
2018 (15th)	God of War	Cory Barlog, Matt Sophos, Richard Zangrande Gaubert	Santa Monica Studio	Sony Interactive Entertainment	
2018 (15th)	Florence		Mountains	Annapurna Interactive	
2018 (15th)	Frostpunk		11 bit studios		
2018 (15th)	Marvel's Spider-Man		Insomniac Games	Sony Interactive Entertainment	
2018 (15th)	Red Dead Redemption 2	Dan Houser, Rupert Humphries, Michael Unsworth	Rockstar Games		
2018 (15th)	Return of the Obra Dinn	Lucas Pope	Lucas Pope		
2019 (16th)	Disco Elysium		ZA/UM		
2019 (16th)	Control		Remedy Entertainment	505 Games	
2019 (16th)	Life Is Strange 2		Dontnod Entertainment	Square Enix	
2019 (16th)	Outer Wilds		Mobius Digital	Annapurna Interactive	
2019 (16th)	The Outer Worlds		Obsidian Entertainment	Private Division	
2019 (16th)	Star Wars Jedi: Fallen Order	Aaron Contreras, Matt Michnovetz, Stig Asmussen	Respawn Entertainment	Electronic Arts	
2020 (17th)	Hades	Greg Kasavin	Supergiant Games		
2020 (17th)	Assassin's Creed Valhalla		Ubisoft Montreal	Ubisoft	
2020 (17th)	Cyberpunk 2077		CD Projekt Red	CD Projekt	
2020 (17th)	Ghost of Tsushima	Nate Fox, Ian Ryan, Writing Team	Sucker Punch Productions	Sony Interactive Entertainment	
2020 (17th)	Marvel's Spider-Man: Miles Morales		Insomniac Games	Sony Interactive Entertainment	
2020 (17th)	Kentucky Route Zero: TV Edition		Cardboard Computer	Annapurna Interactive	
2021 (18th)	Unpacking	Wren Brier, Tim Dawson, Annie VanderMeer	Witch Beam	Humble Bundle	
2021 (18th)	It Takes Two		Hazelight Studios	Electronic Arts	
2021 (18th)	Life Is Strange: True Colors		Deck Nine	Square Enix	
2021 (18th)	Marvel's Guardians of the Galaxy		Eidos-Montréal	Square Enix	
2021 (18th)	Psychonauts 2	Tim Schafer	Double Fine	Xbox Game Studios	
2021 (18th)	Returnal		Housemarque	Sony Interactive Entertainment	
2023 (20th)	Baldur's Gate 3		Larian Studios		
2023 (20th)	Alan Wake 2		Remedy Entertainment	Epic Games	
2023 (20th)	Dredge	Joel Mason, Alex Ritchie, Nadia Thorne	Black Salt Games	Team17	
2023 (20th)	Final Fantasy XVI	Kazutoyo Maehiro, Michael-Christopher Koji Fox	Square Enix Creative Business Unit III	Square Enix	
2023 (20th)	The Legend of Zelda: Tears of the Kingdom		Nintendo EPD	Nintendo	
2023 (20th)	Star Wars Jedi: Survivor		Respawn Entertainment	Electronic Arts	
2024 (21st)	Metaphor: ReFantazio		Studio Zero	Sega	
2024 (21st)	Black Myth: Wukong		Game Science		
2024 (21st)	Dragon Age: The Veilguard		BioWare	Electronic Arts	
2024 (21st)	Final Fantasy VII Rebirth		Square Enix		
2024 (21st)	Senua's Saga: Hellblade II		Ninja Theory	Xbox Game Studios	
2024 (21st)	Still Wakes the Deep		The Chinese Room	Secret Mode	
2025 (22nd)	Kingdom Come: Deliverance II		Warhorse Studios	Deep Silver	
2025 (22nd)	Blue Prince	Tonda Ros	Dogubomb	Raw Fury	
2025 (22nd)	Clair Obscur: Expedition 33	Guillaume Broche, Jennifer Svedberg-Yen	Sandfall Interactive	Kepler Interactive	
2025 (22nd)	Death Stranding 2: On the Beach	Hideo Kojima, Kenji Yano, Ray Khalastchi	Kojima Productions	Sony Interactive Entertainment	
2025 (22nd)	Indiana Jones and the Great Circle		MachineGames	Bethesda Softworks	
2025 (22nd)	The Alters	Tomasz Kisilewicz, Katarzyna Tybinka	11 Bit Studios		

- Note: The games that don't have recipients on the table had Development Team or Writing Team credited on the awards page.

== Multiple nominations and wins ==
=== Writers ===
Developer	Nominations	Wins
Neil Druckmann	3	2
Tim Schafer	3	0
Cory Barlog	2	2
Dan Houser	2	0
Jeffrey Yohalem	2	0
Li Kuo	2	0
Lucien Soulban	2	0
Matt Sophos	2	1
Richard Gaubert	2	1
Rupert Humphries	2	0
Sam Barlow	2	1
Tameem Antoniades	2	0
Todd Howard	2	0

=== Developers ===
Developer	Nominations	Wins
Naughty Dog	5	2
Ubisoft Montreal	5	0
BioWare	5	0
Double Fine	4	1
Bethesda Game Studios	3	0
Obsidian Entertainment	3	0
Remedy Entertainment	3	0
Santa Monica Studio	3	2
Arkane Studios	2	0
CD Projekt Red	2	0
Don't Nod	2	1
Eidos-Montréal	2	0
Fullbright	2	0
Insomniac Games	2	0
Ninja Theory	3	0
Respawn Entertainment	2	0
Rockstar North	2	0
Rocksteady Studios	2	0
Starbreeze Studios	2	0
Telltale Games	2	1
The Chinese Room	2	0

=== Publishers ===
Developer	Nominations	Wins
Sony Computer/Interactive Entertainment	19	6
Electronic Arts	9	0
Bethesda Softworks	7	0
Square Enix	8	0
Ubisoft	7	0
Annapurna Interactive	5	0
Microsoft/Xbox Game Studios	6	0
Rockstar Games	4	0
2k Games	3	0
505 Games	2	0
Activision	2	1
CD Projekt	2	0
Eidos Interactive	2	0
Warner Bros Interactive	2	0
Xbox Game Studios	2	0
