= Still Wakes the Deep =

2024 video game

- Developer: The Chinese Room
- Publisher: Secret Mode
- Directors: Dan Pinchbeck; John McCormack
- Producer: Bruno Julien
- Designer: Rob McLachlan
- Programmer: Louis Larsson-De Wet
- Artists: Laura Dodds; John McCormack
- Writer: Dan Pinchbeck
- Composer: Jason Graves
- Engine: Unreal Engine 5
- Platforms: Windows; PlayStation 5; Xbox Series X/S
- Release: 18 June 2024
- Genres: Stealth, puzzle
- Mode: Single-player

Still Wakes the Deep is a 2024 psychological horror video game developed by The Chinese Room and published by Secret Mode. The story follows an electrician named Cameron "Caz" McLeary (Alec Newman), who is trapped on a damaged oil drilling platform in the North Sea in the 1970s, having no way to escape while being pursued by mysterious monsters under harsh weather conditions. Played from a first-person perspective, the game does not feature any combat system, and players must rely on stealth and solving simple puzzles to survive. As the player continues the story, the oil rig will gradually evolve and change, though the game itself is largely linear.

Studio co-founder Dan Pinchbeck first pitched Still Wakes the Deep as "The Thing set on an oil rig", and served as the game's director until his departure in mid-2023. The studio, which previously released Amnesia: A Machine for Pigs (2013) and Everybody's Gone to the Rapture (2015), announced Still Wakes the Deep as its return to story-driven horror games. While the game features a supernatural entity, the ocean was described as the game's secondary enemy, and the team felt that the setting would evoke a variety of fears, such as vertigo, drowning, and claustrophobia. The Poseidon Adventure and Annihilation both served as inspirations for the team. The team interviewed engineers who used to work on an oil rig, and viewed BP's documentary archives to ensure that the oil rig presented in the game was authentic and period-accurate. Scottish actors were also recruited, with Alec Newman voicing the game's protagonist.

Announced in June 2023, the game was released for Windows, PlayStation 5, and Xbox Series X and Series S in June 2024. The game received generally positive reviews, with critics praising the game's story, atmosphere, graphics, sound design, and voice performances, while criticizing its gameplay, linear structure, and overall length. Still Wakes the Deep received two nominations at the 28th Annual D.I.C.E. Awards, and eight nominations at the 21st British Academy Games Awards, winning three. An expansion for the game, titled Siren's Rest, was released on 18 June 2025.

== Gameplay ==
As players progress in the game, the environments inside the oil rig will slowly evolve as they are either destroyed or flooded.

Still Wakes the Deep is a psychological horror video game played from a first-person perspective. The game is set in December 1975, on an oil rig named Beira D in the North Sea. Player assumes control of a Glaswegian electrician named Cameron "Caz" McLeary, who must navigate through the oil rig following a catastrophic event, looking for a way to escape while surviving the harsh weather and evading the pursuit of creatures. Caz can run, jump, and climb ladders, though Caz may tremor when navigating through the rig's hostile environments, causing him to fall if the player does not respond in time to quick-time events. Caz is equipped with a flashlight, which can be used to illuminate otherwise dimly lit areas.

The game has no head-up display. If the monster is in close proximity to the player, colored floaters will appear in Caz's peripheral vision. The game does not have a combat system, and players have to rely on stealth (such as hiding behind objects and inside vents or throwing objects to distract enemies) and solving environmental puzzles to survive and progress. When the player is being chased by the monster, they have the option to quickly look behind while running forward. Still Wakes the Deep is a linear game, and the development team uses yellow paint on various surfaces to direct players towards their objectives. Players have to visit several locations multiple times throughout the game's campaign, though the environment will gradually change as events in the game unfold. The game also has a story mode, allowing players to play the game on a lower difficulty.

== Plot ==
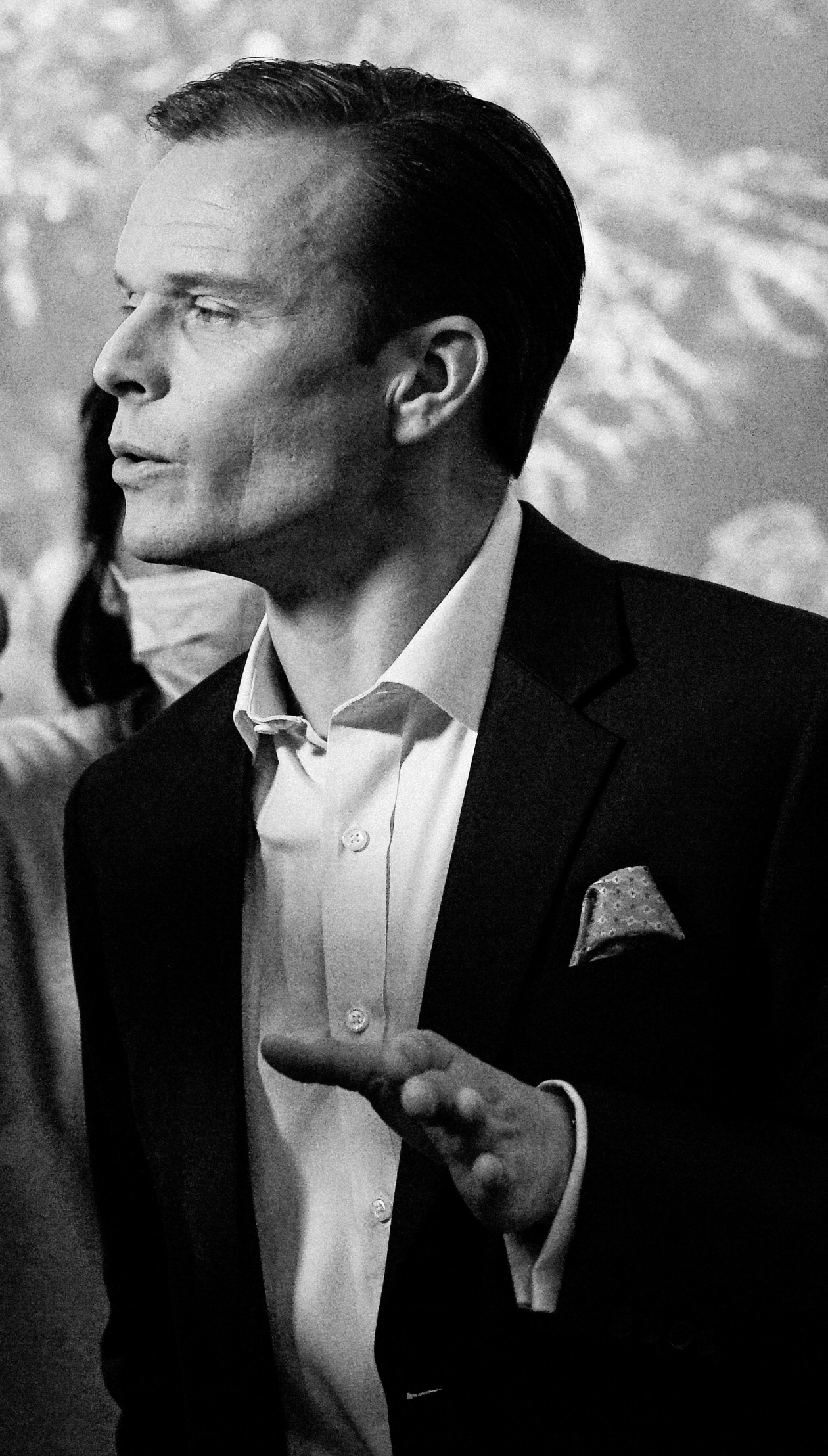
Alec Newman voiced Cameron "Caz" McLeary, the game's protagonist.

On Boxing Day 1975, Cameron "Caz" McLeary (Alec Newman), an electrician for the "Beira D" oil rig in the North Sea, is fired by his bad-tempered boss Davy Rennick (Clive Russell), who discovered Caz is wanted by the Strathclyde Police for a violent altercation and evading arrest. Before Caz can board a helicopter bound for the mainland, a catastrophic drilling failure rocks the facility, knocking him and several men into the sea. Only Caz is rescued and, after coming to, discovers the rig is being overtaken by mysterious blood vessel-like tendrils that were brought up on the drill and contaminated the oil, which mutated numerous workers into bloodthirsty monsters. Evading them, Caz locates his diabetic best friend: the Beira D's cook, Roy (Shaun Dooley), who has taken refuge in the kitchen. Caz then leaves to secure the lifeboats, only to lose them to poor construction.

Rennick orders an evacuation by helicopter, but he leaves without waiting for the others. However, the helicopter crashes into the rig shortly after takeoff. With the tendrils damaging the Beira D further, Caz helps his coworkers Brodie (Michael Abubakar) and Finlay (Karen Dunbar) stop it from capsizing. All the while, the trio are hunted by the monsters, whose presence causes them to hallucinate seeing and hearing their families. After preventing a gas explosion when the flare tower fails, Caz attempts to rescue Roy, but finds him dead from diabetic ketoacidosis. After Brodie sacrifices himself to float the rig, a despondent Finlay snaps and attempts to blow up the platform using a lighter that Caz had given her, but is crushed by falling machinery. Before dying, Finlay convinces Caz to do it to prevent the infestation from spreading to the mainland. Caz agrees and, in his last moments, relives memories of meeting his wife Suze (Neve McIntosh) and the birth of their children.

Back in Scotland, Suze, who previously sent Caz a letter hinting at divorce, writes a new letter to him; resolving to persevere in their marriage and wishing for him and Roy to come home.

=== Siren's Rest ===
On 14 May 1986, eleven years after the Beira D was destroyed, saturation divers Mhairi and Rob are sent on an underwater search and recovery mission to retrieve the rig's data logger, catalogue the remains of its deceased crew, and retrieve their personal effects to return them to their families. Searching the rig, Mhairi discovers some of the bodies are covered in fossilized coral-like growths. She soon retrieves the data logger, but is temporarily knocked out by falling debris and briefly experiences a vision of herself on the Isle of Skye before coming to and narrowly escaping the rig as it falls apart. While making her way back to the diving bell, she sees more of the Beira D's wreckage at the bottom of a trench. Mhairi reports her findings to Rob, who is initially reluctant to investigate further until she convinces him that this may be their only chance at finding out what happened. Their diving supervisor, Hans, eventually agrees to send them down a second time, on the condition that communications will not be lost at such a low depth.

Upon returning to the wreckage, Mhairi makes her way to the accommodation block, where she becomes trapped and is forced to sever her umbilical cable. Unable to reach her, Rob gives her several flares and tells her to meet him back at the diving bell. Mhairi navigates through the rig and eventually finds an air pocket, where she hallucinates Rob chasing her before being chased by a monster. She successfully escapes, but is drawn into another vision and finds herself exploring the Beira D before it was destroyed. After locating her father Brodie's room and finding a sentimental photograph, she regains her senses and escapes the rig. Mhairi returns to the diving bell, but Rob is not there. After failing to reach Hans, the monster suddenly attacks and destroys the bell. Mhairi flees back to the Beira D, where she has one final vision that sees her reuniting with Brodie, who offers his hand and asks her to "dive together" as the Beira D and several of the deceased crew members appear. At this point, Mhairi is presented with two options. If Mhairi accepts and takes Brodie's hand, she silently accepts her fate and drowns in the wreck. If Mhairi refuses and lets go, she awakens to find Rob rescuing her.

== Development ==
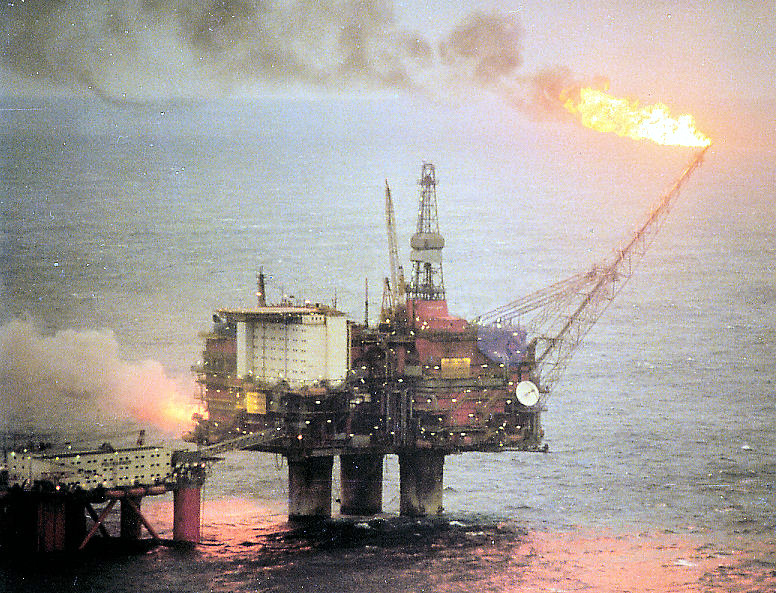
The game is set on an offshore oil drilling platform in the North Sea.

Development of Still Wakes the Deep was led by The Chinese Room, the studio behind Dear Esther, Amnesia: A Machine for Pigs, and Everybody's Gone to the Rapture. The concept was created by the studio's co-founder, Dan Pinchbeck, who directed the game until his departure in mid-2023. John McCormack, the game's art director, was then promoted to replace Pinchbeck. Pinchbeck pitched the game as "The Thing set on an oil rig," while Who Goes There? inspired the overall atmosphere of the game. The team believed that the setting, which sees a group of professionals stranded in a remote place with no outside connections, provided an excellent venue for character drama. An oil rig was chosen to be the game's setting because it provided opportunities to explore various types of fears, such as "vertigo, drowning, claustrophobia". A wide range of films, such as Annihilation, Midsommar, The Southern Reach Trilogy, Sapphire & Steel, and Suspiria all influenced the game. The game was designed to be narrative-driven and intended to evoke these fears through creating tension instead of using tangible gameplay mechanics. The team intentionally avoided implementing punishing gameplay design so that the momentum of the story would not be disrupted. While body horror tropes were used extensively, the team wanted to maintain a sense of mystery, often shrouding them with fog, mist and darkness. Through creating obscurity, the team felt that players would "fill in the gaps themselves with their own worst fears", resulting in a more terrifying experience.

The game does not have a combat system, and the team emphasized that the player character is not an action hero. Reverend Frank Scott from The Poseidon Adventure was described as the "perfect archetype" to Caz McLeary, the game's "unathletic" main character. This is an intentional choice to make players feel "powerless", so that every decision made by players would feel impactful. Puzzle solving and traversal, therefore, become the main ways for players to progress. While Caz is an everyman, he was not designed to be an "empty shell" for players to inhabit. He, and his surrounding cast of characters had their own backstory and reactions to the events unfolding in the game. The goal for the team was to create a story in which "extraordinary events" happened to a very ordinary person, and the horror aspects of the game were grounded with common, relatable themes concerning love, family, and relationships with loved ones. To save money, the team chose to set the game at Christmas. This allowed them to create fewer characters, as only a skeleton crew would remain on the oil rig during the holiday.

Early sections of the game focus on meeting the crew. This section of the game was inspired by the documentary films made by British director Ken Loach. They were used to juxtapose with the later events in the game, which focus more on horror and action. These sections of the game were inspired by the works of Stanley Kubrick. As the game is set in a small environment, players sometimes have to visit the same locations multiple times. To keep the overall experience interesting, the oil rig is gradually changed as events unfold in the game, with portions becoming completely destroyed or flooded, potentially opening up new areas for players to explore. Designer Rob McLachlan compared the oil rig in the game to the spaceships and space stations in Event Horizon and Dead Space. Spaces inside the oil rig are small, and navigation through its various compartments was designed to be difficult. This was an intentional decision made by the design team, as in the design of an oil rig, most areas are reserved for machines, and the needs of humans are not prioritized. The time period was chosen as during that time, there was little to no workplace safety awareness, with workers having limited or no access to advanced equipment such as GPS and satellite phones to connect with the outside world, ultimately evoking a strong sense of isolation and helplessness.

As the game is set in Scotland, the team was able to include voices not commonly represented in games set in the United Kingdom. Voice actors from the Isle of Skye, Dundee, Aberdeen and Glasgow were recruited. Alec Newman provided the voice for Caz, and the supporting cast includes Neve McIntosh, Karen Dunbar, Michael Abubakar, Clive Russell and Shaun Dooley. McCormack felt so strongly about properly reflecting Scottish identity that he pushed for a Scottish Gaelic language option, even at the potential expense of other game features. The team spent an extensive amount of time interviewing people who used to work on an oil rig, and viewed BP's documentary archives to ensure that the oil rig presented in the game was authentic and period-accurate. The team also watched urban exploration videos of stranded oil rigs on YouTube, and carried out research on storm history and freak waves. The team also made unsuccessful attempts to visit decommissioned oil rigs in Hartlepool and Hull. McCormack, who is a Scot himself, advised the team on the aesthetic of Scotland in the 1970s. Abigail's Party, Scarfolk Council, Don't Look Now and Rosemary's Baby were cited as inspirations for the game's overall look, which was intended to be "unnerving" and "unsettling" despite its initial innocuous presentation. The team wanted players to "fear the waves, and to feel trapped above the cold dark water." The team also wanted to capture the feeling of "dreich", a Scottish word representing grey and gloomy weather, one that "has taken all the colour and joy out of the surroundings". The sections set on the exteriors of the rigs where the player is surrounded by ocean were used to create contrast with the claustrophobic environments inside the oil rig. Elaborating on the ocean setting, McLachlan described the North Sea as inglamorious, an endless "grey ocean filled with sediment", one that is both "unknown and unknowable".

Still Wakes the Deep was announced in June 2023 by The Chinese Room and publisher Secret Mode. It was released on 18 June 2024, for Windows PC, PlayStation 5, and Xbox Series X and Series S. The Chinese Room released an expansion for the game on 18 June 2025. Titled Siren's Rest, it is set in 1986 and follows a new cast of characters as they explore the sunken ruins of Beira D.

== Reception ==
Reception

Aggregate scores
Aggregator	Score
Metacritic	(PC) 77/100 (PS5) 74/100 (XSXS) 83/100
OpenCritic	70% recommend (Note: Based on 83 reviews.)

Review scores
Publication	Score
Destructoid	8/10
Eurogamer	3/5
Game Informer	7/10
GameSpot	7/10
GamesRadar+	4/5
Hardcore Gamer	4.5/5
IGN	6/10
PC Gamer (US)	86/100
VG247	4/5

According to review aggregator website Metacritic, the PS5 version of the game received "mixed or average" reviews, while the PC and Xbox Series X/S versions received "generally favourable" reviews. It was the 10th best-selling retail game in the United Kingdom in its week of release.

Tauriq Moosa from The Verge praised the game's visuals and sound design for contributing to an immersive experience and concluded his review by describing the game as a "worthy addition to the horror canon" and "further proof that the great void of the ocean is something I want to avoid". Matthew Murphy from Hardcore Gamer also praised Beira D as the "most accurate depiction of an oil rig" ever shown in a game, and liked how the in-game environments altered as players progressed in the game and revisited certain locations. He also liked the performance of the game's all-Scottish cast, adding that they "brought the script and their characters to life and held nothing back in their work", and singled out Alec Newman's performance as Caz. Elie Gould from PC Gamer strongly praised the game's story, calling it "emotional", and liked the game's cast of characters. He added that the game delivered "the most traumatic dialogue and voice acting" he had ever seen in a horror game. Mark Delaney from GameSpot also liked the game's story, describing it as "somber", "sad" and "spooky". Jim Trinca from VG247 called it Chinese Room's best game and an "incredible artistic achievement" for blending the horror aspect of Amnesia: A Machine for Pigs and the atmosphere and world-building of Dear Esther.

Gould liked the game's pacing and its balance of action and horror, and added that the game was not as "exhausting" as other horror games available in the market. Jamie Moorcroft-Sharp from Destructoid compared the game to Alien: Isolation, and liked the game's enemy and environment variety. He commended the enemy design, which was "ripped right out of nightmares". He concluded his review by saying that "outside of Dredge, I don't know if a game has felt so uniquely Lovecraftian". Writing for GamesRadar, Leon Hurley praised its similarity to The Thing, though he noted that it focused more on "eldritch and cosmic horror". He strongly praised the game's atmosphere and pacing, and how the game often teased the presence of a monster instead of directly showing it. He also praised the game's lack of a head up display, which contributed to player's immersion.

Gameplay received generally mixed reviews. Moosa found the options to be limiting and linear, though he praised the controls for being very "tactile" and "intuitive". Eurogamer's Matt Wales disliked the gameplay, calling it "disengaging" and critiqued its overly linear structure and its excessive use of visual cues to guide players forward, leaving no room for exploration. Leana Hafer from IGN also found the gameplay to be uninspiring, and that players who have experience with games of similar nature may no longer find Still Wakes the Deep scary because it did nothing to stand out from its competition. In addition, she remarked that it was "frustrating to play with its nearly on-rails structure that actively scoffs at the idea of exploration" and expressed her disappointment for the puzzles in the games for being underwhelming and simple. While Jason Rodriguez from Game Informer liked the chase sequences, he found them to be too sporadic, and further criticized the game's enemy artificial intelligence for undermining the horror aspect of the game. Several critics remarked that the game was short.

=== Awards ===
Year	Ceremony	Category	Result	Ref.
2024	Golden Joystick Awards	Best Audio Design	Nominated	
2024	Golden Joystick Awards	Best Supporting Performer (Neve McIntosh)	Nominated	
2025	28th Annual D.I.C.E. Awards	Outstanding Achievement in Audio Design	Nominated	
2025	28th Annual D.I.C.E. Awards	Outstanding Achievement in Story	Nominated	
2025	Game Audio Network Guild Awards	Best Ensemble Cast Performance	Nominated	
2025	21st British Academy Games Awards	Artistic Achievement	Nominated	
2025	21st British Academy Games Awards	Audio Achievement	Nominated	
2025	21st British Academy Games Awards	British Game	Nominated	
2025	21st British Academy Games Awards	Narrative	Nominated	
2025	21st British Academy Games Awards	New Intellectual Property	Won	
2025	21st British Academy Games Awards	Performer in a Leading Role (Alec Newman)	Won	
2025	21st British Academy Games Awards	Performer in a Supporting Role (Michael Abubakar)	Nominated	
2025	21st British Academy Games Awards	Performer in a Supporting Role (Karen Dunbar)	Won	
2025	Develop:Star Awards	Best Game	Nominated	
2025	Develop:Star Awards	Best Visual Art	Won	
2025	Develop:Star Awards	Best Original IP	Nominated	
2025	Golden Joystick Awards	Best Game Expansion (Siren's Rest)	Nominated	
