= Jessica Curry =

British video game composer

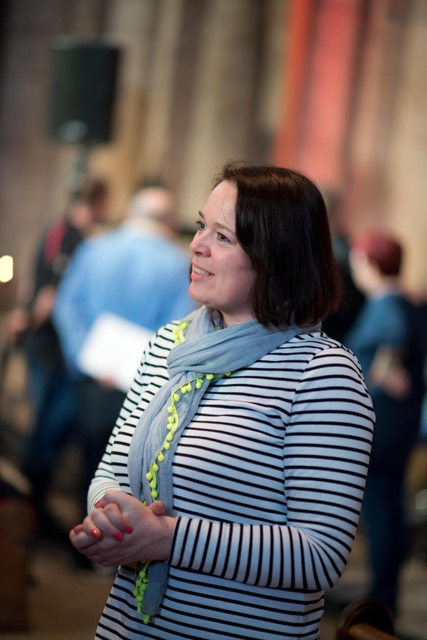
- Education: University College London; National Film and Television School
- Occupation: Composer
- Spouse: Dan Pinchbeck
- Website: jessicacurry.co.uk

Jessica Curry is an English composer, radio presenter, and former co-head of the British video game development studio The Chinese Room. She won a BAFTA award in 2016 for her score for the video game Everybody's Gone to the Rapture and received an honorary doctorate from Abertay University in 2023.

== Career ==
When Dan Pinchbeck was developing his experimental video game Dear Esther he turned to his wife Curry to write a score. Thus Curry became the co-founder of The Chinese Room game studio.

Following the success of that game, The Chinese Room went on to develop Amnesia: A Machine for Pigs which Curry describes as her first "journey into interactivity."

While Amnesia was in production, The Chinese Room received an approach from Sony Computer Entertainment's Santa Monica Studio to develop an exclusive game for them. Everybody's Gone to the Rapture, which had originally been envisioned as a PC release, subsequently became a PlayStation 4 exclusive. Curry describes Rapture as "the first time I would say that I wrote a truly interactive score".

In October 2015 Curry announced via her blog on The Chinese Room's website that, while she would remain a company director, she was lessening her creative involvement with the studio.

In April 2016, Curry won a BAFTA at the 12th British Academy Games Awards for her music on Everybody's Gone to the Rapture.

In 2018, in recognition of her outstanding contribution to music, along with her efforts in the promotion of games and game music within arts and culture and her dedication to making the industry a better place to work, she was awarded the Outstanding Contribution award by MCV Women in Games.

After her departure from The Chinese Room, Curry embarked on various other projects including a collaboration with poet laureate Carol Ann Duffy which saw poems by Duffy performed to music by Curry and others at Durham Cathedral in July 2016 as part of a centenary remembrance of the Battle of the Somme.

In October 2016 Curry's score to Dear Esther was performed live by a full orchestra at London's Barbican Centre to coincide with the release of the game for the PS4 and Xbox One consoles.

In January 2017, it was announced that Curry would present High Score, Classic FM's six-episode series on video game music. In October 2017 it was announced that Curry's show was renewed for another six episodes, starting 4 November.

Starting October 2019, Curry presented Sound of Gaming on BBC Radio 3, a weekly series on video game music.

In 2022 Curry's music rounded out the first ever Prom dedicated to games music.

In June 2025, Curry released Shielding Songs, an album mostly made up of new versions of her favourite pieces featuring the London Voices choir.

== Personal life ==
Curry and husband Dan Pinchbeck have been together since 2000. They are based in Brighton and have one child, Oscar.

She is a fan of film director Peter Greenaway and his frequent collaborator, composer Michael Nyman.

She is the daughter of the late James Curry, of the Currys Electrical chain, and writer Chris Curry Cliff. Her step father, the late Tony Cliff, was a Radio 4 drama producer.

== Awards ==
=== BAFTA Awards ===
Year	Nominee / work	Award	Result	Ref.
2013	Dear Esther	Best Audio	Nominated	
2016	Everybody's Gone to the Rapture	Best Audio	Won	
2016	Everybody's Gone to the Rapture	Best Music	Won	

=== D.I.C.E. Awards ===
Year	Nominee / work	Award	Result	Ref.
2016	Everybody's Gone to the Rapture	Outstanding Achievement in Original Music Composition	Nominated	
2021	Little Orpheus	Outstanding Achievement in Original Music Composition	Nominated	

=== Ivor Novello Awards ===
Year	Nominee / work	Award	Result
2020	Little Orpheus	Best Original Video Game Score	Nominated

=== MCV Women in Games Awards ===
Year	Nominee / work	Award	Result
2018	Jessica Curry	Outstanding Contribution	Won

=== Game Audio Network Guild Awards ===
Year	Nominee / work	Award	Result
2012	Dear Esther	Best Audio	Nominated
2013	Jessica Curry	Rookie of the Year	Won
2013	Amnesia: A Machine for Pigs	Best Soundtrack	Won
2013	Amnesia: A Machine for Pigs	Best Original Vocal: Songs	Won
2016	Everybody's Gone to the Rapture	Music of the Year	Nominated
2016	Everybody's Gone to the Rapture	Best Interactive Score	Nominated
2016	Everybody's Gone to the Rapture	Best Mix	Nominated
2016	Everybody's Gone to the Rapture	Best Soundtrack Album	Nominated
2016	Everybody's Gone to the Rapture	Best Original Song	Won
2016	Everybody's Gone to the Rapture	Best Dialogue	Won
2018	So Let Us Melt	Best Music for a Casual/Social Game	Won
2018	So Let Us Melt	Best Music for an Indie Game	Won
2018	So Let Us Melt	Best Sound Design in a Casual/Social Game	Won
2021	Little Orpheus	Best new original IP audio	Nominated

=== Other awards ===
Year	Nominee / work	Award	Category	Result	Ref.
2012	Dear Esther	TIGA	Best Audio	Won	
2012	Dear Esther	Music + Sound	Best Audio	Nominated	
2012	Dear Esther	IGF	Excellence in Audio	Nominated	
2013	Amnesia: A Machine for Pigs	TIGA	Best Sound	Won	
2013	Amnesia: A Machine for Pigs	SXSW	Best Sound	Nominated	
2013	Amnesia: A Machine for Pigs	Music + Sound	Best Audio Production	Nominated	
2013	Amnesia: A Machine for Pigs	Music + Sound	Best Sound	Nominated	
2015	Everybody's Gone to the Rapture	VGMO	Score of the year Cinematic/Orchestral	Nominated	
2015	Everybody's Gone to the Rapture	VGMO	Western Artist of the Year	Nominated	
2015	Everybody's Gone to the Rapture	VGMO	Album of the Year	Nominated	
2015	Everybody's Gone to the Rapture	VGMO	Audio of the Year: Music Production	Nominated	
2015	Everybody's Gone to the Rapture	TIGA	Audio Design	Nominated	
2016	Everybody's Gone to the Rapture	Emotional Games Awards	Best Music	Won	
2016	Everybody's Gone to the Rapture	Game Developer Choice	Best Audio	Nominated	
2016	Everybody's Gone to the Rapture	SXSW	Excellence in Musical Score	Nominated	
2016	Everybody's Gone to the Rapture	MOSMA	Best Video Game Music	Won	
2016	Everybody's Gone to the Rapture	NAVGTR	Best Video Game Music	Won	
2016	Everybody's Gone to the Rapture	NAVGTR	Song, Original or Adapted	Nominated	
2016	Everybody's Gone to the Rapture	NAVGTR	Sound Effects	Nominated	
2016	Everybody's Gone to the Rapture	NAVGTR	Use of Sound	Nominated	
2021	Little Orpheus	Develop	Best Audio	Nominated	
2021	Little Orpheus	Music + Sound	Best original composition	Nominated	

== Works ==
Video games
Year	Title
2008	Dear Esther
2009	Korsakovia
2013	Amnesia: A Machine for Pigs
2015	Everybody's Gone to the Rapture
2017	So Let Us Melt
2020	Little Orpheus
