= Little Orpheus =

2020 video game

- Developer: The Chinese Room
- Publishers: Sumo Digital; Secret Mode (PC, console)
- Director: Dan Pinchbeck
- Composers: Jim Fowler; Jessica Curry
- Engine: Unity
- Platforms: iOS; macOS; Microsoft Windows; Nintendo Switch; PlayStation 4; PlayStation 5; Xbox One; Xbox Series X/S
- Release: 12 June 2020; Windows, Nintendo Switch, PS4, PS5, Xbox One, Xbox Series X/S; 13 September 2022
- Genres: Adventure, platform
- Mode: Single-player

Little Orpheus is a 2020 adventure-platform game developed by The Chinese Room and published by Sumo Digital. The game was released on Apple Arcade on 12 June 2020 for iOS, macOS, and tvOS. Ports for Microsoft Windows, Nintendo Switch, PlayStation 4, PlayStation 5, Xbox One and Xbox Series X/S were released by subsidiary label Secret Mode on 13 September 2022.

== Gameplay ==
The game is a 2.5D adventure platform game, featuring cinematic platforming and environmental storytelling. Players control protagonist Ivan Ivanovich as he traverses fantastical landscapes, jumping across terrain and ropes and occasionally interacting with environmental objects for progression.

== Plot ==
In 1962, Soviet cosmonaut Ivan Ivanovich was sent into an extinct volcano to explore the centre of the earth in an atomically powered exploration capsule named Little Orpheus; he was never heard of again until he reappeared in 1965, noting that he had lost Little Orpheus and was taken into custody.

Ivan proceeds to tell an unnamed General about his purported journey, where he traverses untamed wilds and extreme terrain, while attempting to rescue Little Orpheus from an apparently living and insane Eduard von Toll, who enslaved humanoid beings named Menkv and attempted to use Little Orpheus to manipulate time and consequently the human race. Eventually, his story becomes increasingly absurd and logically flawed to the point he could not continue, revealing his story to be a farce covering up his desertion from the faulty Little Orpheus. Despite contemplating execution by firing squad, the general was entertained by the story and impressed by Ivan's storytelling skills; he helped Ivan complete his story to record it and spared him of execution, instead allowing him to retire with a pension by the insanity defense. Ivan returns home to his dog Laika (whom he had apparently rescued from orbit) and told her his imaginary return to the surface, which was omitted from his conversation with the general due to a lack of time.

== Development and release ==
The game was first shown in an Apple Arcade showcase at the Apple Event on 25 March 2019. The company's Twitter account posted a teaser with a cryptic message in the form of a telegram. Creative Europe had published the application of successful grants in August 2017, with a project "Little Orpheus" being awarded a maximum of grant €72 339 with 50% co-funding.

Creative Director Dan Pinchbeck said the game's intent was described as applying the studio's "arthouse background to traditional genres moving forward" and with a world filled with ridiculous "Soviet space technology, Russian mythology, and ancient creatures", like a homage to Ray Harryhausen movies.

The game was released on Apple Arcade on 12 June 2020. A new game plus mode was released on 9 October 2020. An update added episode 9 on 15 January 2021. The title was set to release on Microsoft Windows, Nintendo Switch, PlayStation 4, PlayStation 5, Xbox One, and Xbox Series X/S on 1 March 2022 but was delayed due to its Soviet themes in light of the Russo-Ukrainian War. The game launched on 13 September 2022.

== Reception ==
=== Critical reception ===
Reception

Aggregate scores
Aggregator	Score
Metacritic	IOS: 71/100; PC: 67/100; PS4: 68/100; NS: 65/100; XSXS: 72/100
OpenCritic	34% recommend

Review scores
Publication	Score
Destructoid	7/10
IGN	8/10
Nintendo Life	6/10
Pocket Gamer	4/5
The Guardian	4/5
VideoGamer.com	7/10

Little Orpheus received "mixed or average" reviews according to review aggregator website Metacritic. Fellow review aggregator OpenCritic assessed that the game received weak approval, being recommended by 34% of critics.

Matt Gardner writing for Forbes gave the game a mixed review, praising its story but criticizing its gameplay: "Little Orpheus over-relies its strongest assets–great voice acting, an intriguing script, beautiful art, and engaging gameplay–and doesn't hit these highs with its core gameplay." Nintendo Life's Lowell Bell criticized the narration of the game: "there's no narrative payoff here, no greater meaning or memorable conclusion that sticks with you".

=== Accolades ===
Develop awarded it Best Mobile Game at the Star Awards in 2021. Pocket Gamer awarded it Best Platformer Game in 2021.

Award	Date of ceremony	Category	Recipient(s)	Result	Ref.
Apple Design Awards	June 10, 2021	Best Game: Delight and Fun	Little Orpheus	Won	
Apple Design Awards	June 10, 2021	Best Game: Visuals and Graphics	Little Orpheus	Nominated	
D.I.C.E Awards	April 22, 2021	Mobile Game of the Year	Dan Pinchbeck, Alex Girling, Matt Duff, Rob McLachlan	Nominated	
D.I.C.E Awards	April 22, 2021	Outstanding Achievement in Original Music Composition	Jessica Curry, Jim Fowler	Nominated	
TIGA Awards	November 24, 2020	Best Casual Game	Little Orpheus	Won	
TIGA Awards	November 24, 2020	Best Visual Game	Little Orpheus	Nominated	
TIGA Awards	November 24, 2020	Best Action and Adventure Game	Little Orpheus	Nominated	
Ivor Novello Awards	September 21, 2021	Best Original Videogame Score	Jessica Curry, Jim Fowler	Nominated	
Golden Joystick Awards	November 24, 2020	Best Mobile Game	Little Orpheus	Nominated	
The Game Audio Network Guild Awards	April 28, 2021	Best New Original IP - Audio	Little Orpheus	Nominated	
