= Korsakovia =

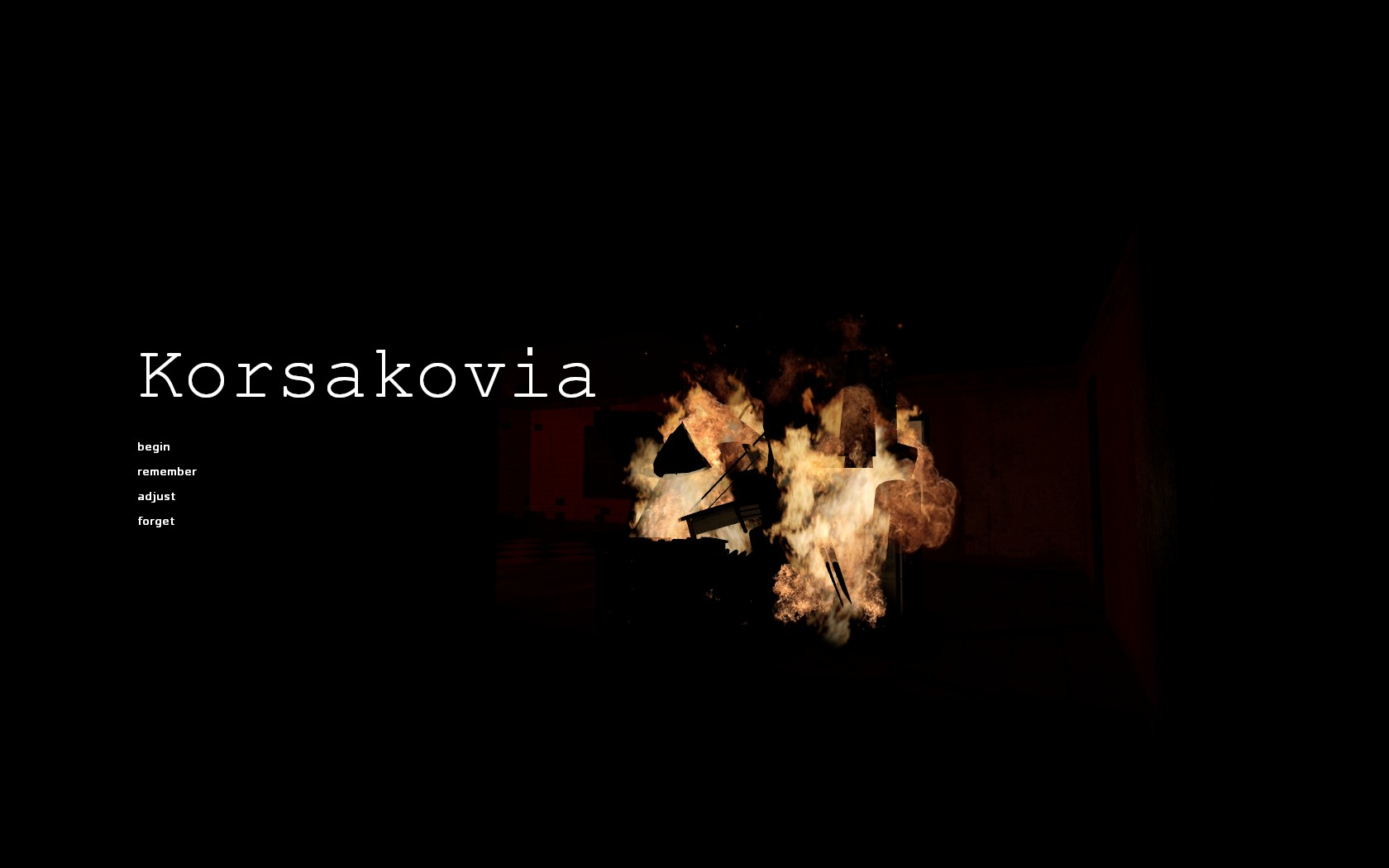
- Developer: The Chinese Room
- Publisher: The Chinese Room
- Composer: Jessica Curry
- Engine: Source
- Platform: Microsoft Windows
- Release: 20 September 2009
- Genre: Psychological horror
- Mode: Single-player

Korsakovia is a single-player mod for Valve's video game Half-Life 2. It was developed by The Chinese Room. Korsakovia was released as freeware download on 20 September 2009.

== Plot ==
In Korsakovia, the player travels through the delusions of Christopher, a man suffering from Korsakoff's syndrome. The player hears the voices of Christopher and a doctor as they try to help Christopher.

== Location ==
The game takes place in numerous presumably illusory locations, ranging from an asylum to a factory. Objects sometimes float or otherwise defy the ordinary laws of physics. The player has the standard Half-Life 2 flashlight, but it often runs out of electricity and must be turned off to recharge. The overall ambiance is nightmarishly grim, grimy, and depressing, an effect that is amplified considerably by atmospheric music and sound effects.

The narrator's words imply that the player is under treatment in a hospital while he is having the delusions that constitute the game. Before the beginning of the game, Christopher was found in his living room with copper wire around his hands. He had punched the television and the wires caught fire, which is the cause of the damage to his hands. He also seems to have ripped his own eyeballs out and eaten them as reported by the paramedics. These injuries and their rationale are referenced repeatedly in the narration and by objects the player finds in his illusory landscape.

== Gameplay ==
Like The Chinese Room's previous mod, Dear Esther, the player explores the environment while listening to narration. However, this time the player can move far more freely and is sometimes armed with a crowbar, which he uses to smash through obstacles or ward off monsters composed of black smoke. The player can also pick up health packs to repair damage, the existence and extent of which is indicated by cracks spreading inward from the edges of his screen. If the player "dies" as a result of too much damage, they are returned to the last previous save point.
