= Amnesia: A Machine for Pigs =

2013 video game

- Developer: The Chinese Room
- Publisher: Frictional Games
- Designers: Dan Pinchbeck; Peter Howell; Andrew Crawshaw; Patrik Dekhla; Thomas Grip; Jens Nilsson
- Programmers: Maarten Demeyer; Thomas Grip; Luis Rodero Morales; Peter Wester
- Artists: Sindre Grønvoll; Brady Jones; Wesley Tack; Aaron Clifford; Marcus Johansson; Marc Nicander
- Writer: Dan Pinchbeck
- Composer: Jessica Curry
- Series: Amnesia
- Engine: HPL Engine 2
- Platforms: Windows, OS X, Linux, PlayStation 4, Xbox One, Nintendo Switch
- Release: 10 September 2013: Windows, OS X, Linux; 10 September 2013; PlayStation 4; 22 November 2016; Xbox One; 28 September 2018; Switch; 19 September 2019
- Genre: Survival horror
- Mode: Single-player

Amnesia: A Machine for Pigs is a 2013 survival horror game developed by The Chinese Room and published by Frictional Games. Originally meant to be a mod, the game is an indirect sequel to Amnesia: The Dark Descent (2010), which was both developed and published by Frictional Games. While set in the same universe as the previous game, it features a new cast of characters and time setting.

Amnesia: A Machine for Pigs was released for Windows on 10 September 2013. The game was released for PlayStation 4 on 22 November 2016 as part of the Amnesia Collection, including Amnesia: The Dark Descent and its Amnesia: Justine expansion. It received mixed reviews from critics.

== Gameplay ==
Amnesia: A Machine for Pigs is a survival horror game played from a first-person perspective. As protagonist Oswald Mandus, players explore and interact with a variety of environments using an electric lantern and discover diary entries and notes for information on Mandus's lost memory. Some areas are patrolled by "manpigs": monstrous humanoid pigs who will chase and attack Mandus on sight. While the core mechanics of the game are the same as in The Dark Descent, some elements have been removed or altered for the sake of providing a fresh gameplay experience to players of the first game. The inventory system has been removed, as has the need to find oil and tinderboxes to maintain adequate lighting. Most of the puzzles are based on physically interacting with the environment because of this change. The sanity mechanic of the first game has been removed, meaning that standing in the darkness and looking at enemies no longer have any drawbacks. Health lost when Mandus is injured will regenerate after a certain period of time, thereby eliminating the need to find items to restore health as in The Dark Descent. The game's level design has been touted as "significantly different" from that of The Dark Descent, with larger areas and outdoor environments included. Enemy AI was also adjusted to ensure players are unable to predict enemy behavior based on their experiences with the original game.

== Plot ==
The game features several interlocking storylines. Some take place in the past, some in the present, and some are overtly real while some may be imagined. Set in London on New Year's Eve, 1899, the game's protagonist is Oswald Mandus, a wealthy industrialist and butcher. At the beginning of the game, he awakens from a fever that has lasted for several months, after returning from a disastrous expedition to explore Aztec ruins in Mexico. He hears the voices of his sons, Edwin and Enoch, calling for him as they lead him through the different areas.

Mandus receives a call from "the Engineer", who tells Mandus that Edwin and Enoch have been trapped far below them, in the "Machine" which Mandus created beneath his house. The Machine has been sabotaged, putting his sons in danger. The Engineer tasks Mandus with clearing the floodwaters and bringing the Machine back online, providing ongoing guidance through telephones throughout the facility. Mandus is opposed in his tasks by the Manpigs, deformed swine-like monstrosities that patrol the depths through which he descends.

After a series of puzzle-like tasks, Mandus eventually reactivates the Machine, but the Engineer betrays him, taking control of the Machine and unleashing Manpigs out into the streets of London to round up unsuspecting victims with which to feed itself. Mandus regains his memory, recalling the recent past: after returning from Mexico, Mandus was consumed with obsession over a vision of the future presented by an artifact discovered in an Aztec temple by him and his children, known as the "egg,” hinted to be an Orb. In this vision, Mandus witnesses numerous horrors and atrocities that will occur in the coming century, including Edwin and Enoch's deaths at the Battle of the Somme. Driven mad by the vision, Mandus decided that he could not allow it to come to pass, and he built the Machine to create a godlike being via mass ritual human sacrifice to save humanity from its own carnage. He sacrificed Edwin and Enoch to the machine to spare them their fate at the Somme. From there, Mandus began a one-man vendetta against mankind, holding massive parties where he would capture and grind up rich socialites into sausage to sell, and killing hordes of child workers to feed the captive Manpigs. At one point, Mandus' soul ended up splintered in the madness, with the evil, wicked fragments merging with the Machine, creating the Engineer. Mandus, however, soon came to realize the error of his ways and in a bid to stop the Machine, he attempted to sabotage it, before he was hindered by the onset of amnesia and sickness.

Now remembering everything, Mandus vows to finish what he started by destroying the Machine once and for all. Despite the pleas of the Engineer, who believes the world would be better off if the Machine is allowed to consume it, Mandus succeeds in recreating most of the sabotage. As Mandus reaches the core of the Machine; built to resemble an Aztec temple, the Engineer begs for Mandus to stop, reminding him of the future atrocities he witnessed, including the atomic bombings, and the Cambodian genocide. Ultimately, Mandus sacrifices himself to the Machine, putting an end to both it and the Engineer, and ending the horrors above as year 1900 begins.

== Development ==
"How come a game meant for Halloween 2012 has been delayed for so long? Originally we thought it would be a short, experimental game set in the universe of Amnesia, but The Chinese Room had a vision that was bigger than that. As their work progressed, the potential for a much greater project emerged. What we ended up with is no longer what we had first imagined, but a fully fledged Amnesia game. A different kind of Amnesia, but definitely not a short experiment."

— Frictional Games on the delay of the game.

In 2010, after the release of The Dark Descent, Frictional Games wanted to further the Amnesia franchise, but had no time for it. Later, they met Dan Pinchbeck of The Chinese Room at GDC Europe 2011, where the plan for the game began to form. It was originally intended by The Chinese Room to be a small mod, but it was expanded to a larger scale project when "the two companies realized what could be achieved with a larger game."

Development for the game began in December 2011 at The Chinese Room, while Frictional Games was producing and publishing the title. The game was originally set to release before Halloween 2012, but was later delayed to early 2013 due to overwhelming response and to meet the expectations. In February 2013 Frictional Games announced a status update about the game in which they announced they would release the game in Q2 2013.

In late May 2013, Jens Nilsson, the co-founder of Frictional Games, stated in a forum post that: "We know we will not make Q2 (2013), we also know when the game will be ready for launch. We have not set the exact day yet. You can however make good use of the weather outside this summer and look forward to gaming with the piggies as the summer comes to an end." Dan Pinchbeck stated, "Frictional's take is, release it when it's done." In August 2013, The Chinese Room confirmed on their Twitter feed that the final release date for the game was 10 September 2013. The game was available to pre-order since 16 August.

A PlayStation 4 version is included in the Amnesia Collection, released on 22 November 2016 via PlayStation Network, containing Amnesia: The Dark Descent and its expansion Amnesia: Justine.

Two days after its release on PS4 Frictional Games posted a tweet stating that the port managed to recoup all costs and "more".

Frictional Games announced on 23 September 2020 that they would make Amnesia: A Machine for Pigs and Amnesia: The Dark Descent open-source video games under the GNU GPL-3.0-or-later.

== Marketing ==
Initially code-named "gameB" by The Chinese Room, the announcement of Amnesia: A Machine for Pigs was preceded by a viral marketing and alternate reality game campaign that began when Frictional Games updated their website Next Frictional Game, which has prior been used to announce the first installment, in early 2012. The website featured a heavily blurred image, the Amnesia logo and a caption reading "Something is emerging...".

The blurred image was hyperlinked to Google Maps with the search field set as "China". The website was later updated with a slightly less blurred image, and hyperlinked to Google Maps with the search field set as "Boreray." It was updated for a second time, with a non-blurred image (a piece of concept art), redirecting to Google Maps with the search field set as 502 2nd Avenue in Seattle. The three hyperlinks were hints towards The Chinese Room's involvement in the game (a previous game by The Chinese Room, Dear Esther, was set on a Hebridean island like Boreray, and the address in Seattle pointed towards a restaurant named 'The Chinese Room').

Examination of the site's source code led fans to a webpage that resembled a computer console with usable commands and a countdown. After the expiration of the countdown, a message on the page read "A machine for pigs coming fall two thousand twelve." The game was formally announced via video game blog Joystiq.

On 14 June 2012, the first teaser trailer was released on Frictional Games' YouTube channel. It showed various scenes from the game, from industrial settings to more studious rooms. In the final shot, the character wakes up to the sound of an enemy breaking down a door making piglike grunts and squeals. An unseen creature enters the room, its shadow is cast against the back wall as the player hides under a set of stairs. On 31 October 2012, to coincide with Halloween, a second trailer was posted on Frictional Games' YouTube channel. Many new features were shown, such as the updated lantern and the new voice for the main character. The trailer also shows the protagonist being confronted by one of the enemies in the game. On 3 September 2013, Eurogamer released a video of the first 30 minutes of the game.

== Reception ==
Reception

Aggregate score
Aggregator	Score
Metacritic	PC: 72/100

Review scores
Publication	Score
Edge	7/10
Eurogamer	7/10
Game Informer	7.75/10
GameSpot	8/10
IGN	8.3/10
PC Gamer (US)	89/100

Amnesia: A Machine for Pigs received "mixed or average" reviews from critics, according to review aggregator website Metacritic.

Eurogamer gave A Machine for Pigs a score of 7 out of 10, noting that it "will absolutely keep you fed". GameSpot gave the game a score of 8 out of 10, saying that while it's a "captivating adventure", it is also "a very dark and disturbing one that touches on depressing real-world themes and doles out psychological horror along with monsters and gore". Edge magazine wrote that "A Machine For Pigs will prove divisive among fans of Frictional Games' much-lauded original".

Jim Rossignol of Rock, Paper, Shotgun noted in his review of A Machine for Pigs that it "is a marvellous, revolting, disturbing sequel to Dark Descent". PC Gamer's T.J. Hafer expressed his opinion that A Machine for Pigs adds to the palette of The Dark Descent's "helplessness to explore the emotion of fear". Hafer also added that the game "will hold your head underwater until you're about to drown and then bring you back up for air, again and again".

A writer for Game Informer said that The Chinese Room "proves once again that it has wonderful, affecting stories to tell and can create environments that ooze atmosphere", also adding that while having trouble "giving into the scares", it "will still rattle of the faint of heart". He criticized the game however, saying that it is "hard to remain frightened [...] when you feel like the game is pulling punches".

James Stephanie Sterling of Destructoid said that "if you want to be told a vexingly bizarre story presented with a real sense of style, The Chinese Room may have exactly what you want". She also said that "if you're a massive survival horror fan who wants to be made to scream, however, you probably want to stick your snout in someone else's offal".

=== Sales ===
Amnesia: A Machine for Pigs sold 120,000 units in its first week.
