= Incoboto =

2012 puzzle-platformer game

- App icon
- Developer: Fluttermind
- Publisher: Fluttermind
- Platform: iOS
- Release: March 1, 2012
- Genres: Puzzle, platformer
- Mode: Single-player

Incoboto is a 2012 puzzle and platformer game developed and published by the American indie studio Fluttermind. It was released on March 1, 2012, for iOS.

== Reception ==
Reception

Aggregate score
Aggregator	Score
Metacritic	85/100

Review score
Publication	Score
TouchArcade	4.5/5

On Metacritic, the game has a "generally favorable" score of 85 based on nine critics. The game was praised.
