= 9th British Academy Games Awards =

Game award ceremony in 2013

- Date: 5 March 2013
- Location: London Hilton
- Hosted by: Dara Ó Briain
- Best Game: Dishonored
- Most awards: Journey (5)
- Most nominations: Journey (8)

The 9th British Academy Video Game Awards awarded by the British Academy of Film and Television Arts, is an award ceremony that was held on 5 March 2013 in the London Hilton on Park Lane. The ceremony honoured achievement in video gaming in 2012 and was hosted by Dara Ó Briain. This was the first ceremony to introduce the award for British Game, and has been present in every ceremony thus far.

== Winners and nominees ==
Winners are shown first in bold.

**Action**: **Far Cry 3 – Ubisoft Montreal/Ubisoft**; Hitman: Absolution – IO Interactive/Square Enix; Call of Duty: Black Ops II – Treyarch/Activision; Halo 4 – 343 Industries/Microsoft Game Studios; Mass Effect 3 – BioWare/Electronic Arts; Borderlands 2 – Gearbox Software/2K Games	**Mobile & Handheld**: **The Walking Dead – Telltale Games/Telltale Games**; LittleBigPlanet PS Vita – Double Eleven and Tarsier Studios/Sony Computer Entertainment; The Room – Fireproof Games; New Star Soccer – New Star Games/New Star Games; Incoboto – Dene Carter; Super Monsters Ate My Condo – Adult Swim/PikPok
**Artistic Achievement**: **Journey – Matt Nava, Aaron Jessie, thatgamecompany/Sony Computer Entertainment**; The Room – Robert Dodd, Mark Hamilton, Fireproof Games; Halo 4 – Scott Warner, Kenneth Scott, 343 Industries/Microsoft Game Studios; Dear Esther – Robert Briscoe, The Chinese Room/The Chinese Room; Borderlands 2 – Jeramy Cooke, Gearbox Software/2K Games; Far Cry 3 – Jean-Alexis Doyon, Vincent Jean, Genseki Tanaka, Ubisoft Montreal/Ubisoft	**Online – Browser**: **SongPop – FreshPlanet**; The Settlers Online – Blue Byte/Ubisoft; Merlin: The Game – Bobbs Studios; RuneScape – Jagex/Jagex; Amateur Surgeon Hospital – Mediatonic; Dick and Dom’s HOOPLA! – Team Cooper
**Audio Achievement**: **Journey – thatgamecompany/Sony Computer Entertainment**; Far Cry 3 – Ubisoft Montreal/Ubisoft; Beat Sneak Bandit – Simogo; Halo 4 – 343 Industries/Microsoft Game Studios; Assassin's Creed III – Ubisoft Montreal/Ubisoft; Dear Esther – The Chinese Room/The Chinese Room	**Online Multiplayer**: **Journey – thatgamecompany/Sony Computer Entertainment**; Assassin's Creed III – Ubisoft Montreal/Ubisoft; Call of Duty: Black Ops II – Treyarch/Activision; Need for Speed: Most Wanted – Criterion Games/Electronic Arts; Halo 4 – 343 Industries/Microsoft Game Studios; Borderlands 2 – Gearbox Software/2K Games
**Best Game**: **Dishonored – Arkane Studios/Bethesda Softworks**; Far Cry 3 – Ubisoft Montreal/Ubisoft; FIFA 13 – EA Canada/Electronic Arts; Journey – thatgamecompany/Sony Computer Entertainment; Mass Effect 3 – BioWare/Electronic Arts; The Walking Dead – Telltale Games/Telltale Games	**Original Music**: **Journey – Austin Wintory, thatgamecompany/Sony Computer Entertainment**; Diablo III – Russell Brower, Derek Duke, Glenn Stafford, Blizzard Entertainment/Blizzard Entertainment; Assassin's Creed III – Lorne Balfe, Ubisoft Montreal/Ubisoft; Thomas Was Alone – David Housden, Mike Bithell; The Unfinished Swan – Joel Corelitz, Giant Sparrow and Santa Monica Studio/Sony Computer Entertainment; The Walking Dead – Jared Emerson-Johnson, Telltale Games/Telltale Games
**British Game**: **The Room – Fireproof Games**; Need for Speed: Most Wanted – Criterion Games/Electronic Arts; Forza Horizon – Playground Games/Microsoft Studios; Dear Esther – The Chinese Room/The Chinese Room; Super Hexagon – Terry Cavanagh; Lego The Lord of the Rings – Traveller's Tales/Warner Bros. Interactive Entertainment	**Performer**: **Danny Wallace –** **Thomas Was Alone as the Narrator**; Nolan North – Uncharted: Golden Abyss as Nathan Drake; Melissa Hutchison – The Walking Dead as Clementine; Dave Fennoy – The Walking Dead as Lee Everett; Adrian Hough – Assassin's Creed III as Haytham Kenway; Nigel Carrington – Dear Esther as the Narrator
**Debut Game**: **The Unfinished Swan – Giant Sparrow and Santa Monica Studio/Sony Computer Entertainment**; Deadlight – Tequila Works/Microsoft Studios; Forza Horizon – Playground Games/Microsoft Studios; Dear Esther – The Chinese Room/The Chinese Room; The Room – Fireproof Games; Proteus – Ed Key, David Kanaga	**Sports/Fitness**: **New Star Soccer – New Star Games/New Star Games**; Forza Horizon – Playground Games/Microsoft Studios; F1 2012 – Codemasters/Codemasters; FIFA 13 – EA Canada/Electronic Arts; Nike+ Kinect Training – Sumo Digital/Microsoft Studios; Trials Evolution – RedLynx and Ubisoft Shanghai/Microsoft Studios
**Family**: **Lego Batman 2: DC Super Heroes – Traveller's Tales/Warner Bros. Interactive Entertainment**; Minecraft: Xbox 360 Edition – Mojang/Microsoft Studios; Just Dance 4 – Ubisoft/Ubisoft; Skylanders: Giants – Toys for Bob/Activision and Vivendi Games; Clay Jam – Fat Pebble/Zynga; Lego The Lord of the Rings – Traveller's Tales/Warner Bros. Interactive Entertainment	**Story**: **The Walking Dead – Sean Vanaman, Mark Darin, Gary Whitta, Telltale Games/Telltale Games**; Journey – thatgamecompany/Sony Computer Entertainment; Far Cry 3 – Jeffrey Yohalem, Lucien Soulban, Li Kuo, Ubisoft Montreal/Ubisoft; Thomas Was Alone – Mike Bithell; Mass Effect 3 – Mac Walters, BioWare/Electronic Arts; Dishonored – Harvey Smith, Austin Grossman, Terri Brosius, Arkane Studios/Bethesda Softworks
**Game Design**: **Journey – thatgamecompany/Sony Computer Entertainment**; Dishonored – Arkane Studios/Bethesda Softworks; Far Cry 3 – Ubisoft Montreal/Ubisoft; XCOM: Enemy Unknown – Firaxis Games/2K Games; Borderlands 2 – Gearbox Software/2K Games; The Walking Dead – Telltale Games/Telltale Games	**Strategy**: **XCOM: Enemy Unknown – Firaxis Games/2K Games**; Dark Souls – FromSoftware/Namco Bandai Games; Diablo III – Blizzard Entertainment/Blizzard Entertainment; Great Big War Game – Rubicon Developments; Total War: Shogun 2: Fall of the Samurai – The Creative Assembly/Sega; Football Manager 2013 – Sports Interactive/Sega
**Game Innovation**: **The Unfinished Swan – Giant Sparrow and Santa Monica Studio/Sony Computer Entertainment**; Fez – Polytron Corporation/Trapdoor; Call of Duty: Black Ops II – Treyarch/Activision; Wonderbook: Book of Spells – London Studio/London Studio; Journey – thatgamecompany/Sony Computer Entertainment; Kinect Sesame Street TV – Microsoft Studios and Soho Productions/Microsoft Studios	**BAFTA Ones to Watch Award (in association with Dare to Be Digital)**: **Starcrossed – Kajak Games**; Project Thanatos – Raptor Games; Pixel Story – Lamplight Studios

=== Academy Fellowship ===
- **Gabe Newell**

=== Games with multiple nominations and wins ===
==== Nominations ====
Nominations	Game
8	Journey
7	The Walking Dead
6	Far Cry 3
5	Dear Esther
4	Assassin's Creed III
4	Borderlands 2
4	Halo 4
4	The Room
3	Call of Duty: Black Ops II
3	Dishonored
3	Forza Horizon
3	Mass Effect 3
3	The Unfinished Swan
3	Thomas Was Alone
2	Diablo III
2	FIFA 13
2	Lego The Lord of the Rings
2	Need for Speed: Most Wanted
2	New Star Soccer
2	XCOM: Enemy Unknown

==== Wins ====
Awards	Game
5	Journey
2	The Unfinished Swan
2	The Walking Dead
