= 12th British Academy Games Awards =

Game award ceremony in 2016

- Date: 7 April 2016
- Location: Tobacco Dock, London
- Hosted by: Dara Ó Briain
- Best Game: Fallout 4
- Most awards: Everybody's Gone to the Rapture, Her Story, Rocket League (3)
- Most nominations: Everybody's Gone to the Rapture (10)

The 12th British Academy Game Awards awarded by the British Academy of Film and Television Arts, is an award ceremony that was held on 7 April 2016 at Tobacco Dock in London. The ceremony honoured achievement in video gaming in 2015 and was hosted by Dara Ó Briain.

== Winners and nominees ==
The nominees for the 12th British Academy Games Awards were announced on 10 March 2016.

The winners were announced during the awards ceremony on 7 April 2016.

=== Awards ===
Winners are shown first in bold.

**Artistic Achievement**: **Ori and the Blind Forest – Moon Studios/Microsoft Studios**; Assassin's Creed Syndicate – Ubisoft/Ubisoft; Batman: Arkham Knight – Rocksteady Studios/Warner Bros. Interactive Entertainment; Everybody's Gone to the Rapture – The Chinese Room and Santa Monica Studio/Sony Computer Entertainment; Metal Gear Solid V: The Phantom Pain – Kojima Productions/Konami Digital Entertainment; The Witcher 3: Wild Hunt – CD Projekt Red/CD Projekt	**Mobile & Handheld**: **Her Story – Sam Barlow**; Alphabear – Spry Fox; Fallout Shelter – Bethesda Game Studios and Behaviour Interactive/Bethesda Softworks; Lara Croft Go – Square Enix Montréal/Square Enix; Prune – Joel McDonald and Kyle Preston; The Room Three – Fireproof Games
**Audio Achievement**: **Everybody's Gone to the Rapture – The Chinese Room and Santa Monica Studio/Sony Computer Entertainment**; Assassin's Creed Syndicate – Ubisoft/Ubisoft; Batman: Arkham Knight – Rocksteady Studios/Warner Bros. Interactive Entertainment; Metal Gear Solid V: The Phantom Pain – Kojima Productions/Konami Digital Entertainment; Star Wars Battlefront – EA DICE/Electronic Arts; The Witcher 3: Wild Hunt – CD Projekt Red/CD Projekt	**Multiplayer**: **Rocket League – Psyonix/Psyonix**; Destiny: The Taken King – Bungie/Activision; Lovers in a Dangerous Spacetime – Matt Hammill, Jamie Tucker, Adam Winkels, Asteroid Base/Asteroid Base; Splatoon – Nintendo EAD/Nintendo; Tom Clancy's Rainbow Six Siege – Ubisoft Montreal/Ubisoft; World of Warships – Lesta Studio/Wargaming
**Best Game**: **Fallout 4 – Bethesda Game Studios/Bethesda Softworks**; Everybody's Gone to the Rapture – The Chinese Room and Santa Monica Studio/Sony Computer Entertainment; Life Is Strange – Dontnod Entertainment/Square Enix; Metal Gear Solid V: The Phantom Pain – Kojima Productions/Konami Digital Entertainment; Rocket League – Psyonix/Psyonix; The Witcher 3: Wild Hunt – CD Projekt Red/CD Projekt	**Music**: **Everybody's Gone to the Rapture – Jessica Curry, The Chinese Room and Santa Monica Studio/Sony Computer Entertainment**; Assassin's Creed Syndicate – Austin Wintory, Tripod and Bear McCreary, Ubisoft/Ubisoft; Batman: Arkham Knight – Nick Arundel and David Buckley, Rocksteady Studios/Warner Bros. Interactive Entertainment; Fallout 4 – Inon Zur, Bethesda Game Studios/Bethesda Softworks; Halo 5: Guardians – Kazuma Jinnouchi, Nobuko Toda and Peter Cobbin, 343 Industries/Microsoft Studios; Ori and the Blind Forest – Gareth Coker, Moon Studios/Microsoft Studios
**British Game**: **Batman: Arkham Knight – Rocksteady Studios/Warner Bros. Interactive Entertainment**; Everybody's Gone to the Rapture – The Chinese Room and Santa Monica Studio/Sony Computer Entertainment; Her Story – Sam Barlow; Prison Architect – Introversion Software/Introversion Software; Tearaway Unfolded – Tarsier Studios and Media Molecule/Sony Computer Entertainment; Until Dawn – Supermassive Games/Sony Computer Entertainment	**Original Property**: **Until Dawn – Supermassive Games/Sony Computer Entertainment**; Everybody's Gone to the Rapture – The Chinese Room and Santa Monica Studio/Sony Computer Entertainment; Her Story – Sam Barlow; Life Is Strange – Dontnod Entertainment/Square Enix; Ori and the Blind Forest – Moon Studios/Microsoft Studios; Splatoon – Nintendo EAD/Nintendo
**Debut Game**: **Her Story – Sam Barlow**; Keep Talking and Nobody Explodes – Ben Kane, Brian Fetter and Allen Pestaluky; Lovers in a Dangerous Spacetime – Matt Hammill, Jamie Tucker, Adam Winkels; Mini Metro – Dinosaur Polo Club/Dinosaur Polo Club and Playism; Ori and the Blind Forest – Moon Studios/Microsoft Studios; Prune – Joel McDonald and Kyle Preston	**Performer**: **Merle Dandridge – Everybody's Gone to the Rapture as Kate Collins**; Ashly Burch – Life Is Strange as Chloe Price; Doug Cockle – The Witcher 3: Wild Hunt as Geralt of Rivia; Oliver Dimsdale – Everybody's Gone to the Rapture as Stephen Appleton; Mark Hamill – Batman: Arkham Knight as The Joker; Masasa Moyo – Broken Age: Act 2 as Vella
**Family**: **Rocket League – Psyonix/Psyonix**; Disney Infinity 3.0 – John Blackburn, John Vignocchi and Bob Lowe, Avalanche Software/Disney Interactive Studios; FIFA 16 – EA Canada/EA Sports; Guitar Hero Live – FreeStyleGames/Activision; Lego Dimensions – Jon Burton, James McLoughlin and Nick Ricks, TT Games/Warner Bros. Interactive Entertainment; Super Mario Maker – Nintendo EAD/Nintendo	**Persistent Game**: **Prison Architect – Introversion Software/Introversion Software**; Destiny: The Taken King – Bungie/Activision; Final Fantasy XIV: A Realm Reborn – Square Enix/Square Enix; Guitar Hero Live – FreeStyleGames/Activision; Lego Dimensions – Jon Burton, James McLoughlin and Dave Dootson; The Witcher 3: Wild Hunt – CD Projekt Red/CD Projekt
**Game Design**: **Bloodborne – FromSoftware/Sony Computer Entertainment**; Grow Home – Ubisoft Reflections/Ubisoft; Her Story – Sam Barlow; Lovers in a Dangerous Spacetime – Matt Hammill, Jamie Tucker, Adam Winkels, Asteroid Base/Asteroid Base; Rocket League – Psyonix/Psyonix; The Witcher 3: Wild Hunt – CD Projekt Red/CD Projekt	**Sport**: **Rocket League – Psyonix/Psyonix**; Dirt Rally – Codemasters/Codemasters; FIFA 16 – EA Canada/EA Sports; Football Manager 2016 – Sports Interactive/Sega; Forza Motorsport 6 – Ryan Cooper, Bill Giese and Dave Gierok, Turn 10 Studios/Microsoft Studios; Pro Evolution Soccer 2016 – PES Productions/Konami
**Game Innovation**: **Her Story – Sam Barlow**; Everybody's Gone to the Rapture – The Chinese Room and Santa Monica Studio/Sony Computer Entertainment; Life Is Strange – Dontnod Entertainment/Square Enix; Metal Gear Solid V: The Phantom Pain – Kojima Productions/Konami Digital Entertainment; Splatoon – Nintendo EAD/Nintendo; Until Dawn – Supermassive Games/Sony Computer Entertainment	**Story**: **Life Is Strange – Dontnod Entertainment/Square Enix**; Everybody's Gone to the Rapture – The Chinese Room and Santa Monica Studio/Sony Computer Entertainment; Her Story – Sam Barlow; Undertale – Toby Fox; Until Dawn – Supermassive Games/Sony Computer Entertainment; The Witcher 3: Wild Hunt – CD Projekt Red/CD Projekt

=== BAFTA Fellowship Award ===
- **John Carmack**

=== BAFTA Ones to Watch Award ===
- **Sundown – Steven Li, Aaron Hong, Mclean Goldwhite, Theodore Park, Kenny Regan, Cynthia Cantrell, Gracie May and Jade Kim**

=== AMD eSports Audience Award ===
- **Smite**

=== Games with multiple nominations and wins ===
==== Nominations ====
Nominations	Game
10	Everybody's Gone to the Rapture
7	Her Story
7	The Witcher 3: Wild Hunt
5	Batman: Arkham Knight
5	Life Is Strange
5	Rocket League
4	Metal Gear Solid V: The Phantom Pain
4	Ori and the Blind Forest
4	Until Dawn
3	Assassin's Creed Syndicate
3	Lovers in a Dangerous Spacetime
3	Splatoon
2	Destiny: The Taken King
2	Fallout 4
2	FIFA 16
2	Guitar Hero Live
2	Lego Dimensions
2	Prison Architect
2	Prune

==== Wins ====
Awards	Game
3	Everybody's Gone to the Rapture
3	Her Story
3	Rocket League
