= Everybody's Gone to the Rapture =

2015 video game

- Developer: The Chinese Room (Note: Additional work by Santa Monica Studio.)
- Publisher: Sony Computer Entertainment
- Director: Jessica Curry
- Designer: Andrew Crawshaw
- Writer: Dan Pinchbeck
- Composer: Jessica Curry
- Engine: CryEngine
- Platforms: PlayStation 4 Windows
- Release: PlayStation 4; 11 August 2015; Windows; 14 April 2016
- Genre: Adventure
- Mode: Single-player

Everybody's Gone to the Rapture is a 2015 adventure video game developed by The Chinese Room and published by Sony Computer Entertainment for the PlayStation 4. The game takes place in a small English village whose inhabitants have mysteriously disappeared. It is considered a spiritual successor to Dear Esther (2012), also by The Chinese Room. It was released for PlayStation 4 on 11 August 2015 and for Windows on 14 April 2016. It received positive reviews from critics.

== Gameplay ==
In Everybody's Gone to the Rapture, the player explores a small English village whose inhabitants have mysteriously disappeared. The player can interact with floating lights throughout the world, most of which can reveal parts of the story. The player can interact with objects such as doors, radios, phones, fences, and power switches.

== Plot ==
The game takes place in 1984 in a fictional Shropshire village named Yaughton. The player's objective is to explore and try to discover how and why everybody in the village has disappeared. Mysterious floating orbs of light swim around the air and lead the player to scenes made up of other human-shaped lights, which re-enact various previously occurring events. Following the orbs' evidence from scene-to-scene across the valley, as well as finding telephones and radios that replay conversations, recordings, and broadcasts, eventually provide all of the puzzle pieces to the game's main event, the "rapture".

There are five areas in the game, each of which revolve around a different character, with the main protagonists being Dr Katherine "Kate" Collins and her husband, Stephen Appleton, both scientists at the observatory. During their work, Kate and Stephen encounter a strange pattern of lights in the night sky which they believe is an unknown form of life. They observe the pattern infecting and sometimes killing other lifeforms such as birds and cows, before spreading to humans. Kate concludes that the pattern is attempting to communicate with humans, ignorant to the harm that it is causing them.

After confronting Stephen about his ongoing affair with his former fiancée Lizzie Graves, Kate locks herself in the observatory and spends the vast majority of the story attempting to communicate with the pattern. During this time, Stephen becomes convinced that the pattern is a deadly threat capable of destroying the human race.

Most of the valley's inhabitants begin to succumb to symptoms of unexplained haemorrhaging, and pressure in the brain that is normally consistent with a brain tumour, as the doctor notes in a left-behind recording. Other people disappear, leaving behind a room full of odd specks of light and the lingering scent of unidentifiable ash. Convinced that this is connected to the pattern and that it will spread beyond the village if not contained, Stephen urges the local government to quarantine the area, blocking the roads and cutting the telephone lines. The locals are told that it is due to an outbreak of Spanish flu, though many are sceptical of this and become even more so when the corpses of the dead begin to disappear into thin air.

As the town's population rapidly dwindles, Stephen realises that the quarantine has failed and that the 'pattern', or 'It' as it is often referred to, has learnt to adapt. He believes that it has learned to travel not just through direct human contact, but through the telephone lines, radio waves, and television sets. In light of this, he desperately insists to the local government that they must gas the valley.

In the penultimate chapter of the game, the player is led to a bunker where Stephen waited out the nerve gas bombings with the intention of killing himself once he ensured that every other infected person in the valley is dead. When he is unable to reach anyone at all outside the valley via telephone, he realises that he has failed and that the pattern has spread, presumably to the entire planet. The pattern comes for him and he confronts It. He tells It that he has decided to set fire to himself, having doused himself in petrol to prevent being taken by It. Moments before he ignites the fuel, an image of Kate appears in the pattern of the light. Stephen stands in awe, reaching out to her. The scene fades out as Stephen's lighter slips out of his hand and hits the ground, igniting the petrol.

In the final part of the game the player is transported to the inside of the observatory's locked entrance gate. The player makes their way up the hill to the top-most observatory and upon entering, sees the human light shape of Kate inside in the darkness, making the last of the recordings heard. She states that she is the last one left, and it is revealed that she did achieve communication with It. Kate explains that when she told the pattern that what it did to everyone in the valley — the people, the birds, the insects, the cows — was wrong; It countered that it was not wrong, because now everyone that wanted to be together was together, and that everyone had found their counterpart and was no longer alone. Kate explains how she finally understands and says that she has accepted her fate, and that she and 'the pattern' will soon join the others. She states that humanity can finally 'slip away, unafraid'. Kate turns and appears to reach out to the pattern coming down from above as it reaches out to meet her, her last words being her belief that the pattern was her own counterpart.

== Development ==
During the development of Dear Esther, the team wanted to introduce interactive elements. When this proved to be impractical, the concept of Everybody's Gone to the Rapture was born. The developers were inspired by "the very British apocalyptic sci-fi of the 60s and 70s", like John Christopher's The Death of Grass and Charles Eric Maine's The Tide Went Out. The voice cast includes Merle Dandridge, Oliver Dimsdale, Aimee-Ffion Edwards, Susan Brown and Jonathan Bailey.

The team made the decision to partner with Sony's Santa Monica Studio as they felt they could not raise enough money for the project through crowdfunding sources or through sales of alpha versions. A Windows version of the game was released on 14 April 2016. The game's soundtrack composed by Jessica Curry was published by Sony Classical as a 28-track album in the UK.

== Reception ==
Reception

Aggregate score
Aggregator	Score
Metacritic	(PS4) 78/100 (PC) 76/100

Everybody's Gone to the Rapture received "generally favorable" reviews from critics, according to the review aggregator website Metacritic.

GamesRadar called the game "brave, [...] challenging, and [...] essential", while IGN talked about "a beautiful, heart-breaking journey into the end of the world". Everybody's Gone to the Rapture was featured on several "Best games of the year" lists, such as Kirk Hamilton's from Kotaku, Alexa Ray Corriea's from GameSpot or Kill Screen's "Best Videogames of 2015" list.

Some reviewers criticised what was perceived as too little interactivity from the player. James Stephanie Sterling, while analysing games often derided as "walking simulators", said that Everybody's Gone to the Rapture is a model of what not to do in this genre, such as by not shifting the tone of the game as it progresses, and by making the back-story more interesting than the game itself. They unfavourably compared it to Gone Home and The Stanley Parable.

=== Accolades ===
Year	Award	Category	Recipient(s)	Result	Ref.
2015	TIGA Games Industry Awards 2015	Creative UK Gameplay Award	Everybody's Gone to the Rapture	Won	
2015	TIGA Games Industry Awards 2015	Casual Game - Large Studio	Everybody's Gone to the Rapture	Nominated	
2015	TIGA Games Industry Awards 2015	Diversity Award	Everybody's Gone to the Rapture	Nominated	
2015	TIGA Games Industry Awards 2015	Original Game	Everybody's Gone to the Rapture	Nominated	
2015	TIGA Games Industry Awards 2015	TIGA Audio Design Award	Everybody's Gone to the Rapture	Nominated	
2015	TIGA Games Industry Awards 2015	TIGA Visual Design Award	Everybody's Gone to the Rapture	Nominated	
2016	19th Annual D.I.C.E. Awards	Outstanding Achievement in Original Music Composition	Everybody's Gone to the Rapture	Nominated	
2016	12th British Academy Games Awards	Audio Achievement	Everybody's Gone to the Rapture	Won	
2016	12th British Academy Games Awards	Music	Jessica Curry	Won	
2016	12th British Academy Games Awards	Performer	Merle Dandridge	Won	
2016	12th British Academy Games Awards	Artistic Achievement	Everybody's Gone to the Rapture	Nominated	
2016	12th British Academy Games Awards	Best Game	Everybody's Gone to the Rapture	Nominated	
2016	12th British Academy Games Awards	British Game	Everybody's Gone to the Rapture	Nominated	
2016	12th British Academy Games Awards	Original Property	Everybody's Gone to the Rapture	Nominated	
2016	12th British Academy Games Awards	Performer	Oliver Dimsdale	Nominated	
2016	12th British Academy Games Awards	Game Innovation	Everybody's Gone to the Rapture	Nominated	
2016	12th British Academy Games Awards	Story	Everybody's Gone to the Rapture	Nominated	
2016	Game Audio Network Guild Awards 2016	Best Original Soundtrack Album	Everybody's Gone to the Rapture	Won	
2016	Game Audio Network Guild Awards 2016	Best Dialogue	Everybody's Gone to the Rapture	Won	
2016	Game Audio Network Guild Awards 2016	Best Original Song: Choral	"The Light We Cast" by Jessica Curry	Won	
2016	Game Audio Network Guild Awards 2016	Best Original Song: Pop	"The Mourning Tree" by Jessica Curry	Won	
2016	Game Audio Network Guild Awards 2016	Audio of the Year	Everybody's Gone to the Rapture	Nominated	
2016	Game Audio Network Guild Awards 2016	Music of the Year	Everybody's Gone to the Rapture	Nominated	
2016	Game Audio Network Guild Awards 2016	Sound Design of the Year	Everybody's Gone to the Rapture	Nominated	
2016	Game Audio Network Guild Awards 2016	Best Mix	Everybody's Gone to the Rapture	Nominated	
2016	Game Audio Network Guild Awards 2016	Best Interactive Score	Everybody's Gone to the Rapture	Nominated	
2016	British Writers' Guild Awards 2016	Best Writing in a Video Game	Everybody's Gone to the Rapture by Dan Pinchbeck	Won	
2016	Develop Awards 2016	Audio Accomplishment	Everybody's Gone to the Rapture	Won	
2016	Develop Awards 2016	New Games IP – PC/console	Everybody's Gone to the Rapture	Nominated	
2016	Develop Awards 2016	Visual Arts	Everybody's Gone to the Rapture	Nominated	
2016	Develop Awards 2016	Use of Narrative	Everybody's Gone to the Rapture	Nominated	
2016	Develop Awards 2016	Independent Studio	The Chinese Room	Nominated	
2016	Emotional Games Awards 2016	Best Emotional Artistic Game Achievement	Everybody's Gone to the Rapture	Won	
2016	Emotional Games Awards 2016	Best Emotional Music	Everybody's Gone to the Rapture	Won	
2016	Emotional Games Awards 2016	Best Emotional Game	Everybody's Gone to the Rapture	Nominated	
