= Sumo Group =

British video game holding company

Sumo Group Limited
- Type: Subsidiary
- Founded: December 2017; 8 years ago
- Headquarters: Sheffield, England
- Key people: Carl Cavers (CEO)
- Number of employees: 1,400 (2023)
- Parent: Tencent (2022–present)
- Subsidiaries: Sumo Digital
- Website: Official website

Sumo Group Limited was a British video game holding company based in Sheffield. It was formed in December 2017 as the parent company for Sumo Digital and Atomhawk, followed by its initial public offering on the London Stock Exchange later that month. After purchasing a minority stake in Sumo Group in November 2019, Tencent wholly acquired the company in January 2022. After divesting all assets apart from Sumo Digital, it effectively ceased to exist in 2025.

== History ==
Carl Cavers, Paul Porter, Darren Mills and James North-Hearn, four former members of the defunct Infogrames Studios, established the developer Sumo Digital in 2003. It was bought by Foundation 9 Entertainment in March 2008 before Cavers, Porter, Mills and Chris Stockwell completed a management buyout of the studio in November 2014. Ian Livingstone served as chairman from 2015 to 2022. In December 2017, Sumo Group was formed in December 2017 as the parent company for Sumo Digital and its Atomhawk subsidiary. Sumo Group had its initial public offering on the London Stock Exchange's (LSE) AIM market later that month.

In November 2019, the Chinese conglomerate Tencent acquired 15 million shares of Sumo Group, representing a 10% stake. Sumo Group acquired Pipeworks Studios in October 2020 and opened a publishing label, Secret Mode, in March 2021. In July that year, Tencent and Sumo Group agreed that Tencent would, through its subsidiary Sixjoy Hong Kong Limited, wholly acquire the company for £5.13 per share (143.3% of the shares' previous closing price of £3.58), totalling £919 million. At the time, Tencent was Sumo Group's second-largest shareholder at 8.75%.

In September 2021, Sumo Group acquired Auroch Digital, a Bristol-based developer, £6 million. Tencent's acquisition was approved by the Committee on Foreign Investment in the United States in December 2021, followed by the High Court of Justice on 13 January 2022. Sumo Group was consequently delisted from the LSE on 17 January and became a subsidiary of Tencent through the latter's Sixjoy Hong Kong Limited holding subsidiary. On July 21, 2022, Sumo Group sold Pipeworks Studios to RuneScape developer Jagex for an undisclosed sum. In September 2023, it was announced Sumo Group had acquired the Leamington Spa-based game development studio, Midoki.

On June 11, 2024, the company announced it would be laying off up to 15% of its workforce and shutting down Timbre Games.

On March 3, 2025, Secret Mode was sold to Emona Capital to operate as a fully independent games publisher. Auroch Digital was acquired by Roundtable Interactive in November 2025.

== Subsidiaries ==
- Sumo Digital
  - Atomhawk
    - Atomhawk Advance
    - Atomhawk Canada
    - Atomhawk Gateshead
  - Lab42
  - Leamington
    - Midoki
  - Red Kite Games
  - Sumo Digital Europe
  - Sumo Digital India
    - Sumo Bangalore
    - Sumo Pune
  - Sumo Digital Nottingham
  - Sumo Digital Sheffield

=== Former subsidiaries ===
- Auroch Digital (divested in 2025)
- Secret Mode (divested in 2025)
- The Chinese Room (divested in 2025)
- Timbre Games (closed in 2024)
