= Dear Esther =

2012 video game

- Developer: The Chinese Room
- Publishers: The Chinese Room; Curve Digital (consoles); Secret Mode (Landmark Edition)
- Producer: Dan Pinchbeck
- Programmer: Jack Morgan
- Artist: Robert Briscoe
- Writer: Dan Pinchbeck
- Composer: Jessica Curry
- Engine: Source; Unity (Landmark Edition)
- Platforms: Microsoft Windows; OS X; PlayStation 4; Xbox One; iOS
- Release: Microsoft Windows; 14 February 2012; OS X 15 May 2012; PlayStation 4, Xbox One; 20 September 2016 iOS; 3 October 2019
- Genre: Adventure
- Mode: Single-player

Dear Esther is a 2012 adventure game developed and published by The Chinese Room. First released in 2008 as a free modification for the Source game engine, the game was entirely redeveloped for a commercial release in 2012. The commercial version was released for Microsoft Windows in February 2012 and OS X in May 2012; ports for PlayStation 4 and Xbox One were released by Curve Digital in September 2016.

Dear Esther is a narrative-focused game with almost no interactions between the player and the world, a design which was controversial on release but later proved influential. The player's only objective in the game is to explore an unnamed island in the Hebrides, Scotland, listening to a troubled man read a series of letters to his deceased wife. Details of her mysterious death are revealed as the player moves throughout the island.

Dear Esther received positive reviews from critics, and is credited with popularising the walking simulator genre in the 2010s. The Chinese Room released a spiritual successor to Dear Esther, titled Everybody's Gone to the Rapture, in 2015.

== Gameplay and plot ==
The gameplay in Dear Esther is minimal, with the only task being to explore an uninhabited Hebridean island, listening to an anonymous man read a series of letter fragments to his deceased wife, Esther. As the player reaches new locations on the island, the game plays a new letter fragment relating to that area. Different audio fragments are revealed in each playthrough of the game, presenting a slightly different narrative each time. Several other characters are referred to by the narrator: a man named Donnelly, who charted the island in the past; Paul, who is suggested to be the drunk driver in the accident in which Esther died; and a shepherd named Jakobson who lived on the island in the 18th century. As the player explores the island, they find the derelict remains of buildings, a shipwreck, and a cave system whose walls are adorned with images resembling chemical diagrams, circuit diagrams, neurons and bacteria. At various points, a figure is seen walking away from the player in the distance, but disappears before they can be reached. As the game progresses, the identities of the characters become more blurred and the player is made to draw their own conclusions of the story.

== Development and release ==
A screenshot showing the cave. The game received praise for its graphical detail.

The original rendition of Dear Esther was one of several Source Engine mods developed by The Chinese Room while the studio was still a research project at the University of Portsmouth. The project was funded by a grant from the Arts and Humanities Research Council and led by Dan Pinchbeck, a professor and lecturer at the university. The story and script were composed by Pinchbeck, who cited the works of William S. Burroughs as influential in the writing: "... looking at the way William Burroughs worked structurally was a big influence, but also I was really interested in moving towards a quite image-heavy, symbolic, poetic use of language rather than the normal descriptive tone we find in games".

Independent games artist Robert Briscoe began work on completely redeveloping Dear Esther in 2009, with the full support of Pinchbeck. Briscoe and The Chinese Room worked in parallel on the game's remake, with much of the level design completed solely by Briscoe based on concept art done by Ben Andrews. In redesigning the island's landscape, Briscoe aimed to eliminate the confusion caused by the original game's layout, and to fill out the environment with "richer, visually interesting" features to improve on the barren landscape of the original mod. In March 2011, while the game was still in development, The Chinese Room lost the financial backing of the University it had relied on. The studio had needed the University to pay for the Source Engine license needed for a commercial release of the game, but the University's legal department was dissatisfied with the license agreement and refused to sign it. The Chinese Room turned to the Indie Fund for finances, who were hesitant at first, but after playing a demo, agreed to fund the project. The Fund's Ron Carmel stated "As soon as people started playing it, the tone of the conversation just completely shifted, and people were very much in favor of supporting this project". Within six hours of the release on Steam, over 16,000 units had been sold, allowing the developers to pay back the full Indie Fund investment.

The voice of Dear Esther's narrator was performed by Nigel Carrington, whose script was extended for the remake. The game's music was composed by Pinchbeck's wife, Jessica Curry, a freelance music composer and co-director of The Chinese Room. In the remake's development, Curry overhauled and re-orchestrated the score to be fuller and longer, featuring more instruments and reaching nearly double the length of the original soundtrack. The music of the original game was released for free in July 2008, shortly after the mod itself was released, and the remastered soundtrack was released on 14 February 2012.

Ports for PlayStation 4 and Xbox One were released by Curve Digital's Secret Mode, a publishing label of Sumo Digital, in September 2016. In February 2017, an updated version based on the Unity engine, Dear Esther: Landmark Edition was released as a free update by Secret Mode. An iOS version was released in October 2019.

== Reception ==
=== Initial release ===
The original free release of Dear Esther was selected for the Animation Exhibition at the 2008 Prix Ars Electronica and made Mod DB's top 100 mods of 2008. In 2009, the game won the award for Best World/Story at the IndieCade Independent Game awards.

Reviewing the game for Honest Gamers in 2009, Lewis Denby praised the game's original tone, saying that the game "taps into an emotion that few games dare to approach: unhappiness" and stated that Curry's soundtrack created "an impressively ethereal atmosphere". Despite commendations for its premise and story, the original mod release received complaints of poor level design and numerous glitches or bugs in moving about the terrain.

=== Commercial release ===
Reception

Aggregate score
| Aggregator | Score |
|---|---|
| Metacritic | PC: 75/100; PS4: 68/100; XONE: 68/100 |

Review scores
| Publication | Score |
|---|---|
| Destructoid | 4.5/10 |
| Eurogamer | 8/10 |
| GameSpot | 8.0/10 |
| IGN | 8/10 |
| PC Gamer (US) | 84% |
| VideoGamer.com | 9/10 |
| The Daily Telegraph | 4/5 |

The 2012 Dear Esther received positive reviews for Windows on Metacritic. The PlayStation 4 and Xbox One version received mixed reviews. Despite questioning whether it truly constitutes a video game, reviewers praised the game's originality and commented favourably on the emphasis on the story; IGN stated that the game "will leave you feeling edified, contemplative, and possibly even emotionally moved." Strategy Informer awarded the game 9/10, calling it "one of the most haunting and well-executed titles of this or any other generation." However, critics were divided by the suitability of the video game medium for conveying the story of Dear Esther. Maxwell McGee of GameSpot claimed that "[the] story in Dear Esther works well in video game form—possibly more than as a book or movie." McGee went further to claim that "video games allow for pacing and discovery that would be impossible to reproduce elsewhere." Reviewing for Destructoid, Allistair Pinsof claimed the opposite, stating that the game "would be better as a short film", although doubted whether "if Dear Esther were a short film, if its vague plot and predictable conclusion would be effective." Eurogamer also offered criticism of the plot, calling the writing "purple in places and wantonly obscure in ways which will draw accusations of pretentiousness", and joked that "the [game's] tendency to deploy extended car metaphors occasionally steers the writing into oncoming traffic." However, the review commended the lasting impact of the story, stating that "its two-hour long chill will remain in your bones for a long while after."

The limited interactivity between the player and the narrative in Dear Esther also divided reviewers. Destructoid's Pinsof stated that "[the] ironic thing is that the most pedestrian of stories can be convincing when coupled with intelligently applied interaction—something Dear Esther stubbornly stands against." PC Gamer did not find the basic gameplay to be a problem, stating that "the lack of puzzles is necessary: it's crucial to the experience that you're allowed to keep moving at your own pace. […] Without puzzles, the visuals and narrative are allowed to take precedence."

The level of detail in Dear Esther's environment was given broad praise by critics. Reviewing for bit-tech, Joe Martin called the game "a graphical masterpiece", commenting that "what gives Dear Esther's visuals such a poignant edge is how masterfully it extends the sense of loneliness and isolation that's conveyed in the script". Writing for The Daily Telegraph, Tom Hoggins noted the effect of the game's more minor details, stating that "[the] broad strokes of Dear Esther's visuals are majestic, but the finer details on the landscape are the most revealing."

At the 2012 Independent Games Festival, Dear Esther received the prize for "Excellence in Visual Arts". In its 2012 Awards, Develop awarded Dear Esther the prize for "Best use of narrative". At the TIGA Games Industry Awards 2012, the game won the "Originality Award" along with the prizes for "Best Action/Adventure game", "Best Visual Design", "Best Audio Design" and "Best Debut Game". The game was nominated for five awards in the 9th British Academy Video Games Awards.

One week within its release on Steam, Dear Esther sold more than 50,000 units. As of September 2013, the game had sold over 850,000 copies.
