= The Chinese Room =

British video game developer

The Chinese Room Ltd.
- Logo used since 2016
- Formerly: Thechineseroom (2007–2013)
- Type: Private
- Industry: Video games
- Founded: 2007; 19 years ago in Portsmouth, England
- Founders: Dan Pinchbeck; Jessica Curry
- Headquarters: Brighton, United Kingdom
- Key people: Dan Pinchbeck (creative director 2007–2023); Ed Daly (CEO); John McCormack (creative director 2023–present)
- Products: Amnesia: A Machine for Pigs; Dear Esther; Everybody's Gone to the Rapture; Korsakovia; Little Orpheus; Still Wakes the Deep; Still Wakes the Deep: Siren's Rest; Vampire: The Masquerade – Bloodlines 2
- Number of employees: 55 (2025)
- Parent: Sumo Digital (2018–2025)
- Website: www.thechineseroom.co.uk

The Chinese Room (formerly Thechineseroom) is a British video game developer based in Brighton that is best known for exploration games. The company originated as a mod team for Half-Life 2, based at the University of Portsmouth in 2007, and is named after John Searle's Chinese room thought experiment. It was a subsidiary of Sumo Digital from 2018 to 2025.

== History ==
=== Early years (2007–2017) ===
Thechineseroom's first three projects were two mods for Half-Life 2, named Antlion Soccer and Dear Esther, and a Doom 3 mod, Conscientious Objector. The modding project was backed by the Arts and Humanities Research Council. Of these, Dear Esther became a cult hit. In 2009, Thechineseroom developed Korsakovia, which was a survival horror mod.

After Korsakovia, Thechineseroom worked with Robert Briscoe to develop a remake of Dear Esther, this time as a full-fledged video game, distributed through Valve's Steam distribution service. This stand-alone version of the mod received several IGF nominations, such as the Seamus McNally Grand Prize, Excellence in Visual Arts and Audio, and the Nuovo Award. It finally won for Excellence in Visual Art. The remake featured improved graphics, but was based on the same engine as the previous mods, Source. The game was released in early 2012 and reached 50,000 copies sold within one week.

In February 2012, Thechineseroom announced that they began development on Amnesia: A Machine for Pigs, a survival horror game and indirect sequel to Amnesia: The Dark Descent. This project was produced by the makers of the original game, Frictional Games.

Thechineseroom also began work on their newest game, Everybody's Gone to the Rapture alongside the development of Amnesia: A Machine for Pigs. During that time, on 11 June 2013, they renamed themselves to the Chinese Room, introducing a new logo. The studio team partnered with Santa Monica Studio to produce Everybody's Gone to the Rapture. It was re-revealed at Gamescom 2013 during Sony's conference as a PlayStation 4 exclusive and released on 11 August 2015.

=== Acquisition and expansion (2017–2025) ===
In late July 2017, the Chinese Room's directors, Dan Pinchbeck and Jessica Curry, laid off the entire staff—at that point eight people—and ditched their Brighton office for home. They cited the lack of ability to pay their staff during the interim between projects as the reason for the closure, and expressed their intentions that the studio itself was still running without the development team, with Pinchbeck and Curry working on prototyping and acquiring funds on their own time. The company released a VR game, So Let Us Melt, for Google Daydream in September, which was the final project of the former studio. At the time, Pinchbeck, Curry, and Andrew Crawshaw were working alone on the studio's next project, 13th Interior, which was to push away from the "walking simulator" model the studio had been known for.

In August 2018, Sumo Group, the parent company of Sumo Digital, acquired the Chinese Room for £2.2 million, making it the fourth UK-based studio under Sumo Digital. Co-founder Pinchbeck took the role of creative director for the Chinese Room, while Curry continued as an independent composer for the studio. Pinchbeck described the acquisition as "the end of a chapter" for the studio as they determined their next project. From late summer 2018, the Chinese Room began re-staffing, adding veteran developers Ed Daly as studio director and John McCormack as art director. Dear Esther launched on iOS on 30 September 2019. On 12 June 2020 the Chinese Room released its first Apple Arcade game, Little Orpheus, to positive reviews. In July 2020, the studio announced it was working on a new game. The Chinese Room revealed their new game, Still Wakes the Deep, at the Xbox Games Showcase 2023.

On 17 July 2023, following the announcement of their new game, co-founder and creative director Dan Pinchbeck announced his departure from the studio after 15 years. At their PAX West panel, Paradox Interactive revealed that the Chinese Room had taken over development duties on Vampire: The Masquerade – Bloodlines 2 from Hardsuit Labs, who were fired from the project in 2021.

=== Second independence (2025–present) ===
Sumo Group was acquired by Tencent in 2022, and in early 2025, underwent a management change with a goal of focusing only on co-development work using licensed intellectual property. As part of this change, the Chinese Room had around a dozen staff downsized in June 2025. In July 2025, the Chinese Room was bought out by management with help from Hiro Capital, with studio head Ed Daly continuing to lead the company. The studio said the buyout was done to avoid being sold off by the Sumo Group to another publisher or private equity group. Daly said the buyout "allows us to scratch the creative itch of continuing to work on new, original intellectual property, but also to partner with other studios on other projects when they fit in with our vision". In February 2026, the Chinese Room announced a publishing deal with Lyrical Games for a new game.

== Accolades ==
The Chinese Room received six BAFTA Games Awards for Everybody's Gone to the Rapture (Audio Achievement, Music and Performer) and Still Wakes the Deep (Best British Game, New Intellectual Property and Performer in a Leading Role). Other significant honors include eight G.A.N.G. Award wins for Amnesia: A Machine for Pigs, Everybody's Gone to the Rapture and So Let Us Melt, eleven wins at The Independent Game Developers' Association, five D.I.C.E. Award nominations, six Golden Joystick Award nominations. The studio has also been recognized by Apple Design Awards for Little Orpheus.

== Games ==
Year	Game
2008	Conscientious Objector (mod)
2008	Dear Esther (mod)
2008	Antlion Soccer (mod)
2009	Korsakovia (mod)
2012	Dear Esther
2013	Amnesia: A Machine for Pigs
2015	Everybody's Gone to the Rapture
2017	So Let Us Melt
2020	Little Orpheus
2024	Still Wakes the Deep
2025	Vampire: The Masquerade – Bloodlines 2
