= British Academy Games Award for Music =

Video game award

- Awarded for: The best music for a video game
- Country: United Kingdom
- Presented by: British Academy of Film and Television Arts
- Currently held by: Ghost of Yōtei – Toma Otowa, Peter Scaturro, Keith Leary
- Website: www.bafta.org/games

The British Academy Video Games Award for Music is an award presented annually by the British Academy of Film and Television Arts (BAFTA). It is given to recognize "excellence in composition for a game music score, through original music and/or creative use of licensed track". The award is given to the composers/development team, the developer and the publisher of the winning game.

The award was first presented at the 1st British Academy Games Awards under the name Original Music. From the 3rd edition to the 7th, the category was named Original Score. It returned to its original name from the 8th to the 10th editions. Since the 11th edition it is presented under its current name. Santa Monica Studio and Sony Interactive Entertainment are the most awarded developer and publisher, with three and eight wins respectively. Among developers, Ubisoft Montreal holds the record for most nominations and most nominations without a win, with seven, while Xbox Game Studios is the most nominated publisher without a win, with nine. Bear McCreary, Keith Leary and Peter Scaturro are the only composers to win two BAFTA awards in this category, winning together for their work on the God of War franchise. Jesper Kyd and Lorne Balfe are the only composers with two nominations who have yet to win.

BAFTA presented earlier games-related music and sound categories at the BAFTA Interactive Awards before the later BAFTA Games Awards format.

As well as his three nominations at the Games Awards, James Hannigan is also credited by BAFTA with two earlier Music nominations at the BAFTA Interactive Awards in 2000, for Theme Park World and FA Premier League Football Manager 1999, taking his total BAFTA-recognised music nominations to five. He also shared recognition in the 2000 Interactive Award for Sound for Theme Park World with Bullfrog Productions; the category at the time encompassed both sound and music.

The current holders of the award are Toma Otowa, Peter Scaturro, and Keith Leary, the composers of Ghost of Yōtei by Sucker Punch Productions and Sony Interactive Entertainment, which won at the 22nd British Academy Games Awards in 2026.

== Winners and nominees ==
In the following table, the years are listed as per BAFTA convention, and generally correspond to the year of game release in the United Kingdom.

Table key
Indicates the winner

Year	Game	Composer(s)	Developer(s)	Publisher(s)	Ref.
2002/03 (1st)	Harry Potter and the Chamber of Secrets	Jeremy Soule	Argonaut	Electronic Arts	
2002/03 (1st)	Command & Conquer: Generals	Bill Brown and Mikael Sandgren	EA Pacific	EA Games	
2002/03 (1st)	Primal	Paul Arnold, Andrew Barnabas and 16Volt	SCE Studio Cambridge	Sony Computer Entertainment	
2002/03 (1st)	Republic: The Revolution	James Hannigan	Elixir Studios	Eidos Interactive	
2002/03 (1st)	TimeSplitters 2	Graeme Norgate	Free Radical Design	Eidos Interactive	
2002/03 (1st)	Return to Castle Wolfenstein	Bill Brown	Gray Matter Studios	Activision	
2003/04 (2nd)	Hitman: Contracts	Jesper Kyd	IO Interactive	Eidos Interactive	
2003/04 (2nd)	Evil Genius	James Hannigan	Elixir Studios	Sierra Entertainment	
2003/04 (2nd)	Fable	Danny Elfman and Russell Shaw	Big Blue Box Studios and Lionhead Studios	Microsoft Game Studios	
2003/04 (2nd)	Forgotten Realms: Demon Stone	Robb Mills	Stormfront Studios and Zono	Atari	
2003/04 (2nd)	Harry Potter and the Prisoner of Azkaban	Jeremy Soule	Griptonite Games, KnowWonder and EA UK	Electronic Arts	
2003/04 (2nd)	Rome: Total War	Jeff van Dyck	The Creative Assembly	Sega	
2005/06 (3rd)	Tomb Raider: Legend	Troels Brun Folmann	Crystal Dynamics	Eidos Interactive	
2005/06 (3rd)	Dragon Quest VIII: Journey of the Cursed King	Koichi Sugiyama	Level-5	Square Enix	
2005/06 (3rd)	LocoRoco	Nobuyuki Shimizu and Kemmei Adachi	Japan Studio	Sony Computer Entertainment	
2005/06 (3rd)	Shadow of the Colossus	Kow Otani	Japan Studio and Team Ico	Sony Computer Entertainment	
2005/06 (3rd)	The Elder Scrolls IV: Oblivion	Jeremy Soule	Bethesda Game Studios	Bethesda Softworks	
2005/06 (3rd)	The Movies	Daniel Pemberton	Lionhead Studios	Activision	
2006/07 (4th)	Ōkami	Masami Ueda, Hiroshi Yamaguchi, Rei Kondoh and Akari Groves	Clover Studio	Capcom	
2006/07 (4th)	Final Fantasy XII	Hitoshi Sakimoto, Hayato Matsuo and Masaharu Iwata	Square Enix		
2006/07 (4th)	God of War II	Gerard Marino, Ron Fish, Mike Reagan and Cris Velasco	Santa Monica Studio	Sony Computer Entertainment	
2006/07 (4th)	Lair	John Debney	Factor 5	Sony Computer Entertainment	
2006/07 (4th)	The Legend of Zelda: Twilight Princess	Toru Minegishi, Asuka Ohta	Nintendo EAD	Nintendo	
2006/07 (4th)	Viva Piñata	Grant Kirkhope	Rare	Microsoft Game Studios	
2007/08 (5th)	Dead Space	Jason Graves, Don Veca	Visceral Games	Electronic Arts	
2007/08 (5th)	Assassin's Creed	Jesper Kyd	Ubisoft Montreal	Ubisoft	
2007/08 (5th)	Fable II	Danny Elfman, Russell Shaw	Lionhead Studios	Microsoft Game Studios	
2007/08 (5th)	Fallout 3	Inon Zur	Bethesda Game Studios	Bethesda Softworks	
2007/08 (5th)	LittleBigPlanet	Kenneth C M Young, Mat Clark, Daniel Pemberton	Media Molecule	Sony Computer Entertainment	
2007/08 (5th)	Metal Gear Solid 4: Guns of the Patriots	Harry Gregson-Williams, Nobuko Toda, Shuichi Kobori, Kazuma Jinnouchi	Konami		
2009 (6th)	Uncharted 2: Among Thieves	Greg Edmonson, Carmen Rizzo	Naughty Dog	Sony Computer Entertainment	
2009 (6th)	Assassin's Creed II	Jesper Kyd	Ubisoft Montreal	Ubisoft	
2009 (6th)	Batman: Arkham Asylum	Nick Arundel, Ron Fish	Rocksteady Studios	Eidos Interactive and Warner Bros. Interactive Entertainment	
2009 (6th)	Call of Duty: Modern Warfare 2	Lorne Balfe, Hans Zimmer	Infinity Ward	Activision	
2009 (6th)	Harry Potter and the Half-Blood Prince	James Hannigan	EA Bright Light Studio	Electronic Arts	
2009 (6th)	PixelJunk Shooter	High Frequency, Bandwidth, Alex Paterson, Dom Beken	Q-Games and Double Eleven	Q-Games	
2010 (7th)	Heavy Rain	Normand Corbeil	Quantic Dream	Sony Computer Entertainment	
2010 (7th)	Alan Wake	Petri Alanko	Remedy Entertainment	Microsoft Game Studios	
2010 (7th)	Fable III	Russell Shaw	Lionhead Studios	Microsoft Game Studios	
2010 (7th)	James Bond 007: Blood Stone	Richard Jacques	Bizarre Creations	Activision	
2010 (7th)	Mass Effect 2	Jack Wall, Jimmy Hinson, Sam Hulick, David Kates	BioWare	Electronic Arts	
2010 (7th)	Super Mario Galaxy 2	Mahito Yokota, Ryo Nagamatsu, Koji Kondo	Nintendo EAD Tokyo	Nintendo	
2011 (8th)	L.A. Noire	Andrew Hale, Simon Hale	Team Bondi	Rockstar Games	
2011 (8th)	Assassin's Creed: Revelations	Jesper Kyd, Lorne Balfe	Ubisoft Montreal	Ubisoft	
2011 (8th)	Batman: Arkham City	Nick Arundel, Ron Fish	Rocksteady Studios	Warner Bros. Interactive Entertainment	
2011 (8th)	Uncharted 3: Drake's Deception	Greg Edmonson	Naughty Dog	Sony Computer Entertainment	
2011 (8th)	Deus Ex: Human Revolution	Michael McCann	Eidos Montréal	Square Enix	
2011 (8th)	The Elder Scrolls V: Skyrim	Jeremy Soule	Bethesda Game Studios	Bethesda Softworks	
2012 (9th)	Journey	Austin Wintory	thatgamecompany	Sony Computer Entertainment	
2012 (9th)	Diablo III	Russell Brower, Derek Duke, Glenn Stafford	Blizzard Entertainment		
2012 (9th)	Assassin's Creed III	Lorne Balfe	Ubisoft Montreal	Ubisoft	
2012 (9th)	Thomas Was Alone	David Housden	Mike Bithell		
2012 (9th)	The Unfinished Swan	Joel Corelitz	Giant Sparrow and Santa Monica Studio	Sony Computer Entertainment	
2012 (9th)	The Walking Dead	Jared Emerson-Johnson	Telltale Games		
2013 (10th)	BioShock Infinite	James Bonney and Garry Schyman	Irrational Games	2K Games	
2013 (10th)	Tearaway	Kenneth C M Young and Brian D'Oliveira	Tarsier Studios and Media Molecule	Sony Computer Entertainment	
2013 (10th)	The Last of Us	Gustavo Santaolalla	Naughty Dog	Sony Computer Entertainment	
2013 (10th)	Beyond: Two Souls	Lorne Balfe	Quantic Dream	Sony Computer Entertainment	
2013 (10th)	Super Mario 3D World	Mahito Yokota and Koji Kondo	Nintendo EAD Tokyo and 1-Up Studio	Nintendo	
2013 (10th)	Assassin's Creed IV: Black Flag	Brian Tyler and Aldo Sampaio	Ubisoft Montreal	Ubisoft	
2014 (11th)	Far Cry 4	Cliff Martinez, Tony Gronick and Jerome Angelot	Ubisoft Montreal	Ubisoft	
2014 (11th)	Alien: Isolation*		The Creative Assembly	Sega	
2014 (11th)	The Banner Saga	Austin Wintory	Stoic	Versus Evil	
2014 (11th)	Fantasia: Music Evolved	Inon Zur	Disney Interactive Studios and Harmonix Music Systems	Disney Interactive Studios	
2014 (11th)	Middle-earth: Shadow of Mordor	Garry Schyman, Nathan Grigg	Monolith Productions	Warner Bros. Interactive Entertainment	
2014 (11th)	The Sailor's Dream*		Simogo		
2015 (12th)	Everybody's Gone to the Rapture	Jessica Curry	The Chinese Room and Santa Monica Studio	Sony Computer Entertainment	
2015 (12th)	Assassin's Creed Syndicate	Austin Wintory, Tripod and Bear McCreary	Ubisoft Quebec	Ubisoft	
2015 (12th)	Batman: Arkham Knight	Nick Arundel and David Buckley	Rocksteady Studios	Warner Bros. Interactive Entertainment	
2015 (12th)	Fallout 4	Inon Zur	Bethesda Game Studios	Bethesda Softworks	
2015 (12th)	Halo 5: Guardians	Kazuma Jinnouchi, Nobuko Toda and Peter Cobbin	343 Industries	Microsoft Studios	
2015 (12th)	Ori and the Blind Forest	Gareth Coker	Moon Studios		
2016 (13th)	Virginia	Lyndon Holland	Variable State	505 Games	
2016 (13th)	Doom	Mick Gordon, Chris Hite, Chad Mossholder	id Software	Bethesda Softworks	
2016 (13th)	Abzû	Austin Wintory	Giant Squid Studios	505 Games	
2016 (13th)	Inside	Martin Stig Andersen, Søs Gunver Ryberg	Playdead		
2016 (13th)	The Last Guardian	Takeshi Furukawa	Japan Studio and GenDesign	Sony Interactive Entertainment	
2016 (13th)	Uncharted 4	Henry Jackman, Jonathan Mayer, Scott Hanau	Naughty Dog	Sony Interactive Entertainment	
2017 (14th)	Cuphead	Kristofer Maddigan	StudioMDHR Entertainment Inc.		
2017 (14th)	Get Even*		The Farm 51	Bandai Namco Entertainment Europe	
2017 (14th)	Hellblade: Senua's Sacrifice	David Garcia Diaz, Andy LaPlegua	Ninja Theory		
2017 (14th)	Horizon Zero Dawn*		Guerrilla Games	Sony Interactive Entertainment Europe	
2017 (14th)	The Legend of Zelda: Breath of the Wild*		Nintendo EPD	Nintendo	
2017 (14th)	What Remains of Edith Finch	Jeff Russo	Giant Sparrow	Annapurna Interactive	
2018 (15th)	God of War	Bear McCreary, Keith Leary, Peter Scaturro	Santa Monica Studio	Sony Interactive Entertainment Europe	
2018 (15th)	Celeste	Lena Raine	Matt Makes Games		
2018 (15th)	Far Cry 5*		Ubisoft Montreal	Ubisoft	
2018 (15th)	Florence*		Mountains	Annapurna Interactive	
2018 (15th)	Gris*		Nomada Studio	Devolver Digital	
2018 (15th)	Tetris Effect	Hydelic, Noboru Mutoh, Takako Ishida	Monstars and Resonair	Enhance Games	
2019 (16th)	Disco Elysium	British Sea Power	ZA/UM		
2019 (16th)	Control	Petri Alanko, Martin Stig Andersen	Remedy Entertainment	505 Games	
2019 (16th)	Death Stranding	Ludvig Forssell, Peter Scaturro, Keith Leary	Kojima Productions	Sony Interactive Entertainment	
2019 (16th)	Outer Wilds*		Mobius Digital	Annapurna Interactive	
2019 (16th)	The Legend of Zelda: Link's Awakening*		Grezzo	Nintendo	
2019 (16th)	Wattam	Asuka Takahashi, Brad Fotsch, Sam Bird	Funomena	Annapurna Interactive	
2020 (17th)	Spider-Man: Miles Morales	John Paesano, Scott Hanau, Alex Hackford	Insomniac Games	Sony Interactive Entertainment	
2020 (17th)	Ghost of Tsushima	Ilan Eshkeri, Shigeru Umebayashi, Peter Scaturro	Sucker Punch Productions	Sony Interactive Entertainment	
2020 (17th)	The Last of Us Part II	Gustavo Santaolalla, Mac Quayle, Scott Hanau	Naughty Dog	Sony Interactive Entertainment	
2020 (17th)	Sackboy: A Big Adventure	Jay Waters, Joe Thwaites, Joanna Skorupa	Sumo Digital	Sony Interactive Entertainment	
2020 (17th)	Hades	Darren Korb	Supergiant Games		
2020 (17th)	Ori and the Will of the Wisps	Gareth Coker	Moon Studios	Xbox Game Studios	
2021 (18th)	Returnal	Bobby Krlic, Joe Thwaites, Harry Krueger	Housemarque	Sony Interactive Entertainment	
2021 (18th)	Deathloop	Tom Salta, Erich Talaba, Ross Tregenza	Arkane Studios	Bethesda Softworks	
2021 (18th)	Far Cry 6*		Ubisoft Toronto	Ubisoft	
2021 (18th)	Halo Infinite	Gareth Coker, Joel Corelitz, Curtis Schweitzer	343 Industries	Xbox Game Studios	
2021 (18th)	Psychonauts 2	Peter McConnell	Double Fire	Xbox Game Studios	
2021 (18th)	Ratchet & Clank: Rift Apart	Scott Hanau, Wataru Hokoyama, Mark Mothersbaugh	Insomniac Games	Sony Interactive Entertainment	
2022 (19th)	God of War Ragnarök	Bear McCreary, Keith Leary, Peter Scaturro	Santa Monica	Sony Interactive Entertainment	
2022 (19th)	Cuphead: The Delicious Last Course	Kristofer Maddigan	Studio MDHR		
2022 (19th)	Elden Ring*		FromSoftware	Bandai Namco	
2022 (19th)	A Plague Tale: Requiem	Olivier Deriviere	Asobo	Focus	
2022 (19th)	Stray*		BlueTwelve	Annapurna Interactive	
2022 (19th)	Tunic	Lifeformed, Janice Kwan	Finji		
2023 (20th)	Baldur's Gate 3	Borislav Slavov	Larian Studios		
2023 (20th)	Alan Wake 2		Remedy Entertainment	Epic Games	
2023 (20th)	Assassin's Creed Mirage		Ubisoft Bordeaux	Ubisoft	
2023 (20th)	Marvel's Spider-Man 2	John Paesano, Scott Hanau, Keith Leary	Insomniac Games	Sony Interactive Entertainment	
2023 (20th)	Star Wars Jedi: Survivor	Gordy Haab, Stephen Barton	Respawn Entertainment	Electronic Arts	
2023 (20th)	The Legend of Zelda: Tears of the Kingdom		Nintendo		
2024 (21st)
2024 (21st)	Helldivers 2	Wilbert Roget II, Ross Tregenza, Keith Leary	Arrowhead Game Studios	Sony Interactive Entertainment	
2024 (21st)	Astro Bot	Kenneth CM Young	Team Asobi	Sony Interactive Entertainment	
2024 (21st)	Black Myth: Wukong		Game Science		
2024 (21st)	Final Fantasy VII Rebirth		Square Enix		
2024 (21st)	Senua's Saga: Hellblade II		Ninja Theory	Xbox Game Studios	
2024 (21st)	Star Wars Outlaws	Wilbert Roget II, Simon Koudriavtsev, Erik Jacobsson	Massive Entertainment	Ubisoft	
2025 (22nd)
2025 (22nd)	Ghost of Yōtei	Toma Otowa, Peter Scaturro, Keith Leary	Sucker Punch Productions	Sony Interactive Entertainment	
2025 (22nd)	Clair Obscur: Expedition 33	Lorien Testard, Alice Duport-Percier	Sandfall Interactive	Kepler Interactive	
2025 (22nd)	Death Stranding 2: On the Beach	Hideo Kojima, Woodkid, Ludvig Forssell	Kojima Productions	Sony Interactive Entertainment	
2025 (22nd)	Dispatch	Andrew Arcadi, Skyler Barto	AdHoc Studio		
2025 (22nd)	Hollow Knight: Silksong	Christopher Larkin	Team Cherry		
2025 (22nd)	Indiana Jones and the Great Circle	Gordy Haab, Pete Ward, Christoffer Larsson	MachineGames	Bethesda Softworks	

(*Note: Games that don't have composers on the table had Development Team credited on the awards page.)

== Multiple nominations and wins ==
=== Composers ===
Developer	Nominations	Wins
Peter Scaturro	4	2
Jeremy Soule	4	1
Austin Wintory	4	1
Scott Hanau	4	1
Jesper Kyd	4	0
Lorne Balfe	4	0
Bear McCreary	3	2
Keith Leary	3	2
Inon Zur	3	0
Gareth Coker	3	0
James Hannigan	3	0
Ron Fish	2	0
Russell Shaw	3	0
Nick Arundel	2	0
Garry Schyman	2	1
Greg Edmonson	2	1
Kristofer Maddigan	2	1
Joe Thwaites	2	1
Gustavo Santaolalla	2	0
Bill Brown	2	0
Daniel Pemberton	2	0
Danny Elfman	2	0
Joel Corelitz	2	0
Kenneth Young	2	0
Koji Kondo	2	0
Mahito Yokota	2	0
Martin Stig Andersen	2	0
Kazuma Jinnouchi	2	0
Nobuko Toda	2	0
Petri Alanko	2	0

=== Developers ===
Developer	Nominations	Wins
Ubisoft Montreal	7	0
Naughty Dog	5	1
Santa Monica Studio	5	3
Bethesda Studios	4	0
Lionhead Studios	4	0
Nintendo EAD/EPD	4	0
Japan Studio	3	0
Rocksteady Studios	3	0
343 Industries	2	0
The Creative Assembly	2	0
Elixir Studios	2	0
Giant Sparrow	2	0
Insomniac Games	2	1
Media Molecule	2	0
Moon Studios	2	0
Quantic Dream	2	0
Remedy Entertainment	2	0

=== Publishers ===
Developer	Nominations	Wins
Sony Computer/Interactive Entertainment	27	8
Ubisoft	9	1
Microsoft/Xbox Game Studios	9	0
Bethesda Softworks	6	0
Electronic Arts	5	1
Annapurna Interactive	5	0
Nintendo	5	0
Activision	4	0
Eidos Interactive	4	1
Warner Bros Interactive	4	0
505 Games	3	1
Bandai Namco Entertainment	2	0
Sega	2	0
Square Enix	2	0

== See also ==
- Grammy Award for Best Score Soundtrack for Video Games and Other Interactive Media
