= British Academy Games Award for Technical Achievement =

Video game award

British Academy Games Award for Technology Achievement
- Awarded for: "The best innovation in gameplay or technology."
- Country: United Kingdom
- Presented by: BAFTA
- First award: 2006
- Currently held by: Ghost of Yōtei
- Website: www.bafta.org/games

The British Academy Games Award for Technical Achievement (formerly the British Academy Games Award for Game Innovation) is an award presented annually by the British Academy of Film and Television Arts (BAFTA) as part of the British Academy Games Awards. It is given in honour of "the best innovation in gameplay or technology". The award was initially known as Innovation at the 3rd British Academy Games Awards ceremony, held in 2006, and was awarded to Dr. Kawashima's Brain Training: How Old is Your Brain?, developed and published by Nintendo. The award was absent from ceremonies held in 2008 to 2010. before returning to the 8th ceremony held in 2011, under the name Game Innovation. For the 2020 awards, the category was renamed again for Technical Achievement as to encompass gameplay programming and visual engineering.

Since its inception, the award has been given to thirteen games. As a developer, Nintendo Entertainment Analysis & Development has a leading six nominations in the category, including two wins, tied with Media Molecule. Japan Studio holds the record for most nominations without a win, with four. Among publishers, Sony Interactive Entertainment has the most wins, with six. Xbox Game Studios are the publisher with the most nominations without a win, with five.

The current holder of the award is Ghost of Yōtei by Sucker Punch Productions and Sony Interactive Entertainment, which won at the 22nd British Academy Games Awards in 2026.

== Winners and nominees ==
In the following table, the years are listed as per BAFTA convention, and generally correspond to the year of game release in the United Kingdom.

Table key
Indicates the winner

Year	Game	Developer(s)	Publisher(s)	Ref.
2006 (3rd)	Dr. Kawashima's Brain Training: How Old Is Your Brain?	Nintendo SPD	Nintendo	
2006 (3rd)	Electroplankton	indieszero	Nintendo	
2006 (3rd)	Guitar Hero	Harmonix	RedOctane	
2006 (3rd)	LocoRoco	Japan Studio	Sony Computer Entertainment	
2006 (3rd)	Shadow of the Colossus	Team Ico, Japan Studio	Sony Computer Entertainment	
2006 (3rd)	We Love Katamari	Namco	Namco	
2007 (4th)	Wii Sports	Nintendo EAD	Nintendo	
2007 (4th)	Battlefield 2142	EA DICE	Electronic Arts	
2007 (4th)	Crackdown	Realtime Worlds	Microsoft Game Studios	
2007 (4th)	Guitar Hero II	Harmonix	Activision	
2007 (4th)	World in Conflict	Massive Entertainment	Sierra Entertainment	
2007 (4th)	World of Warcraft: The Burning Crusade	Blizzard Entertainment	Blizzard Entertainment	
Not Awarded between 2008 and 2010				
2011 (8th)	LittleBigPlanet 2	Media Molecule	Sony Computer Entertainment Europe	
2011 (8th)	Bastion	Supergiant Games	Warner Bros. Interactive Entertainment	
2011 (8th)	Child of Eden	Q Entertainment	Ubisoft	
2011 (8th)	From Dust	Ubisoft Montpellier	Ubisoft	
2011 (8th)	L.A. Noire	Team Bondi	Rockstar Games	
2011 (8th)	The Legend of Zelda: Skyward Sword	Nintendo EAD	Nintendo	
2012 (9th)	The Unfinished Swan	Giant Sparrow, Santa Monica Studio	Sony Computer Entertainment	
2012 (9th)	Fez	Polytron Corporation	Trapdoor	
2012 (9th)	Call of Duty: Black Ops II	Treyarch	Activision	
2012 (9th)	Wonderbook: Book of Spells	London Studio	London Studio	
2012 (9th)	Journey	thatgamecompany	Sony Computer Entertainment	
2012 (9th)	Kinect Sesame Street TV	Microsoft Studios, Soho Productions	Microsoft Studios	
2013 (10th)	Brothers: A Tale of Two Sons	Starbreeze Studios	505 Games	
2013 (10th)	Grand Theft Auto V	Rockstar North	Rockstar Games	
2013 (10th)	Papers, Please	Lucas Pope, 3909 LLC	3909 LLC	
2013 (10th)	The Stanley Parable	Galactic Café	Galactic Café	
2013 (10th)	Tearaway	Tarsier Studios, Media Molecule	Sony Computer Entertainment Europe	
2013 (10th)	Year Walk	Simogo	Simogo	
2014 (11th)	The Vanishing of Ethan Carter	The Astronauts	The Astronauts, Nordic Games	
2014 (11th)	80 Days	Inkle	Inkle, Profile Books	
2014 (11th)	Alien: Isolation	The Creative Assembly	Sega	
2014 (11th)	Lumino City	State of Play Games	State of Play Games	
2014 (11th)	Middle-earth: Shadow of Mordor	Monolith Productions	Warner Bros. Interactive Entertainment	
2014 (11th)	Titanfall	Respawn Entertainment	Electronic Arts	
2015 (12th)	Her Story	Sam Barlow	Sam Barlow	
2015 (12th)	Everybody's Gone to the Rapture	The Chinese Room, Santa Monica Studio	Sony Computer Entertainment	
2015 (12th)	Life Is Strange	Dontnod Entertainment	Square Enix	
2015 (12th)	Metal Gear Solid V: The Phantom Pain	Kojima Productions	Konami Digital Entertainment	
2015 (12th)	Splatoon	Nintendo EAD	Nintendo	
2015 (12th)	Until Dawn	Supermassive Games	Sony Computer Entertainment	
2016 (13th)	That Dragon, Cancer	Numinous Games	Numinous Games	
2016 (13th)	Batman: Arkham VR	Rocksteady Studios	Warner Bros. Interactive Entertainment	
2016 (13th)	Firewatch	Campo Santo	Panic	
2016 (13th)	Pokémon Go	Niantic	Niantic	
2016 (13th)	Unseen Diplomacy	Triangular Pixels	Triangulars Pixels	
2016 (13th)	The Witness	Thekla, Inc.	Thekla, Inc.	
2017 (14th)	The Legend of Zelda: Breath of the Wild	Nintendo EPD	Nintendo	
2017 (14th)	Gorogoa	Jason Roberts, Buried Signal	Annapurna Interactive	
2017 (14th)	Hellblade: Senua's Sacrifice	Ninja Theory Ltd	Ninja Theory Ltd	
2017 (14th)	NieR: Automata	PlatinumGames	Square Enix	
2017 (14th)	Snipperclips	SFB Games	Nintendo	
2017 (14th)	What Remains of Edith Finch	Giant Sparrow	Annapurna Interactive	
2018 (15th)	Nintendo Labo	Nintendo EPD	Nintendo	
2018 (15th)	Astro Bot Rescue Mission	Japan Studio	Sony Interactive Entertainment Europe	
2018 (15th)	Celeste	Matt Makes Games Inc.	Matt Makes Games Inc.	
2018 (15th)	Cultist Simulator	Weather Factory	Humble Bundle	
2018 (15th)	Moss	Polyarc	Polyarc	
2018 (15th)	Return of the Obra Dinn	Lucas Pope	3909	
2019 (16th)	Death Stranding	Kojima Productions	Sony Interactive Entertainment	
2019 (16th)	A Plague Tale: Innocence	Asobo Studio	Focus Home Interactive	
2019 (16th)	Call of Duty: Modern Warfare	Infinity Ward	Activision	
2019 (16th)	Control	Remedy Entertainment	505 Games	
2019 (16th)	Metro Exodus	4A Games	Deep Silver	
2019 (16th)	Sekiro: Shadows Die Twice	FromSoftware	Activision	
2020 (17th)	Dreams	Media Molecule	Sony Interactive Entertainment	
2020 (17th)	Demon's Souls	Japan Studio	Sony Interactive Entertainment	
2020 (17th)	Doom Eternal	id Software	Bethesda Softworks	
2020 (17th)	Microsoft Flight Simulator	Asobo Studio	Xbox Game Studios	
2020 (17th)	The Last of Us Part II	Naughty Dog	Sony Interactive Entertainment	
2020 (17th)	Spider-Man: Miles Morales	Insomniac Games	Sony Interactive Entertainment	
2021 (18th)	Ratchet & Clank: Rift Apart	Insomniac Games	Sony Interactive Entertainment	
2021 (18th)	Forza Horizon 5	Playground Games	Xbox Game Studios	
2021 (18th)	Hitman 3	IO Interactive		
2021 (18th)	Psychonauts 2	Double Fine	Xbox Game Studios	
2021 (18th)	Resident Evil Village	Capcom		
2021 (18th)	Returnal	Housemarque	Sony Interactive Entertainment	
2022 (19th)	Horizon Forbidden West	Guerrilla	Sony Interactive Entertainment	
2022 (19th)	God of War Ragnarök	Santa Monica	Sony Interactive Entertainment	
2022 (19th)	The Last of Us Part I	Naughty Dog	Sony Interactive Entertainment	
2022 (19th)	Elden Ring	FromSoftware	Bandai Namco	
2022 (19th)	Immortality	Half Mermaid Productions		
2022 (19th)	Stray	BlueTwelve	Annapurna Interactive	
2023 (20th)	The Legend of Zelda: Tears of the Kingdom	Nintendo		
2023 (20th)	Alan Wake 2	Remedy Entertainment	Epic Games Publishing	
2023 (20th)	Final Fantasy XVI	Square Enix		
2023 (20th)	Horizon Call of the Mountain	Firesprite, Guerrilla Games	Sony Interactive Entertainment	
2023 (20th)	Marvel's Spider-Man 2	Insomniac Games	Sony Interactive Entertainment	
2023 (20th)	Starfield	Bethesda Game Studios	Bethesda Softworks	
2024 (21st)	Senua's Saga: Hellblade II	Ninja Theory	Xbox Game Studios	
2024 (21st)	Astro Bot	Team Asobi	Sony Interactive Entertainment	
2024 (21st)	Black Myth: Wukong	Game Science		
2024 (21st)	Call of Duty: Black Ops 6	Treyarch, Raven Software	Activision	
2024 (21st)	Tiny Glade	Tomasz Stachowiak, Anastasia Opara	Pounce Light	
2024 (21st)	Warhammer 40,000: Space Marine 2	Saber St. Petersburg	Focus Entertainment	
2025 (22nd)	Ghost of Yōtei	Sucker Punch Productions	Sony Interactive Entertainment	
2025 (22nd)	ARC Raiders	Embark Studios		
2025 (22nd)	Death Stranding 2: On the Beach	Kojima Productions	Sony Interactive Entertainment	
2025 (22nd)	Doom: The Dark Ages	id Software	Bethesda Softworks	
2025 (22nd)	Indiana Jones and the Great Circle	MachineGames	Bethesda Softworks	
2025 (22nd)	Split Fiction	Hazelight Studios	Electronic Arts	

== Multiple nominations and wins ==
=== Developers ===
Developer	Nominations	Wins
Nintendo SPD/Nintendo EAD	6	2
Japan Studio	4	0
Media Molecule	3	2
Santa Monica Studio	3	1
Giant Sparrow	2	1
Harmonix	2	0
Insomniac Games	2	1
Kojima Productions	2	1
Lucas Pope	2	0
Naughty Dog	2	0

=== Publishers ===
Developer	Nominations	Wins
Sony Computer/Interactive Entertainment	19	6
Nintendo	8	4
Microsoft/Xbox Game Studios	5	0
Activision	4	0
Annapurna Interactive	3	0
Warner Bros Interactive	3	0
3909	2	0
505 Games	2	1
Electronic Arts	2	0
Namco	2	0
Rockstar Games	2	0
Square Enix	2	0
Ubisoft	2	0
