= Blue Prince =

2025 puzzle video game

- Developer: Dogubomb
- Publisher: Raw Fury
- Director: Tonda Ros
- Producer: Axel Haavikko
- Designer: Tonda Ros
- Artist: Davide Pellino
- Writer: Tonda Ros
- Composers: Trigg & Gusset
- Engine: Unity
- Platforms: PlayStation 5; Windows; Xbox Series X/S; macOS; Nintendo Switch 2
- Release: PS5, Windows, XSX/S; April 10, 2025; macOS; September 29, 2025; Nintendo Switch 2; March 3, 2026
- Genres: Puzzle-adventure, roguelike
- Mode: Single-player

Blue Prince is a puzzle adventure game developed by Dogubomb and published by Raw Fury. It was released on April 10, 2025, for PlayStation 5, Windows and Xbox Series X/S systems, with a later release for macOS on September 29, 2025, and Nintendo Switch 2 on March 3, 2026.

The game challenges the player to explore a mansion with ever-shifting rooms that change every day, represented by ad-hoc construction of the mansion's 45 rooms through the drafting of randomized cards representing new rooms, with an initial goal to reach a hidden 46th room. In addition, the mansion includes lore and other mysteries that can be solved by the player, leaving puzzle threads that can extend beyond that initial goal.

Blue Prince was developed over eight years by solo developer Tonda Ros. Ros was influenced by the illustrated book Maze: Solve the World's Most Challenging Puzzle by Christopher Manson and other puzzle books along with tabletop games that featured drafting.

The game received critical acclaim upon release, and won Outstanding Achievement for an Independent Game and Outstanding Achievement in Game Design at the 29th Annual D.I.C.E. Awards.

== Gameplay ==
The player takes the role of Simon P. Jones, who has been willed the Mt. Holly Estate, a mansion owned by his deceased great uncle Herbert S. Sinclair. The one stipulation in Herbert's will is that Simon must locate a hidden 46th room within the mansion in order to secure his inheritance. Failure to reach that room within the span of a single day means Simon must start the search fresh the next day, as the house's architecture is rearranged overnight. While discovering the 46th room is the primary goal of the game, there are other mysteries that the player can discover related to the mansion, such as the disappearance of children's author Marion Marigold.

The mansion is represented by a grid of 45 room tiles, nine rows by five. Only two rooms persist in the same locations every day: the Entrance Hall where the player starts, and the Antechamber that leads to the 46th room on the opposite side of the map. Upon opening a door to a new room, the player is prompted to draft that room by choosing one of three randomly selected floor plans to place in the adjacent space. The doors and walls of the new room do not necessarily need to align with already-placed rooms' existing doors, but failure to align them results in blocked, unusable doors. Many potential rooms are dead-ends. These are sometimes still desirable, offering rewards for constructing them.

When placing a room, the player is informed of the room's contents. This can include keys (used to open locked doors to other rooms), gems (used to purchase certain floor plans), coins (used to purchase food and tools), and tools that can help access spaces in specific rooms. Rooms may also include puzzles, some which are isolated to the room itself, while others require searching through multiple rooms to deduce the answer. Rooms have different tiers depending on which row of the grid they have been played, with higher-tier rooms having more complex puzzles or more lucrative rewards.

Traversing from one room into another costs one "step". The player begins each day with 50 steps, but can replenish them by eating food items and entering bedrooms. Once the player exhausts their steps or otherwise finds they cannot progress further, they are forced to leave the mansion for the night and abandon all objects they have collected. There are means to retain items between runs, as well as gain permanent upgrades that provide extra steps, gems, or coins at the start of a run. The player also retains knowledge of the larger puzzles in the mansion, and is encouraged to take notes.

Once the player has successfully reached the 46th room for the first time, they unlock challenges for future runs, and can collect trophies to denote completed challenges. There is an extensive post-game to Blue Prince, with many secrets and areas only available after reaching room 46. These become increasingly challenging and labyrinthine; as of November 2025 a number of puzzles remain unsolved by the community. Ros has indicated that he will not formally announce when everything has been solved, as the developers of the comparably deep Animal Well did.

== Plot ==
The game begins with Simon P. Jones arriving at Mt. Holly Estate, where he has set up a camping tent outdoors. Though not explicitly told to the player, the estate is located in the realm of Fenn Aries, one of numerous city-states on the low fantasy, parallel universe planet of Mora. While superficially similar to Earth, major differences in technology include commonplace use of airships as transport, and a building technique called "drafting" that is able to materialize and disintegrate individual rooms on a space-time level. As Simon traverses the estate, he is able to view various clues to the world's history. While censored in its typical form, a secret original copy of a history book explains the realm's past: the formerly peaceful realm of Orinda Aries, named after that world's paragon, or angel, of royalty, was overthrown by an uprising — the Fennsurrection — led by nobles from the cities of Fenn and Oris who opposed King Desilets III's generosity towards commoners. After the War of Ruin, the highly unpopular Desilets IV was forced into exile, and the traitorous General Teskin set up an authoritarian regime under the name of Fenn Aries. The original black color of the Orinda Aries sigil was changed to red.

This in turn provides a basis for solving the disappearance of Simon's mother, the children's book writer Mary Jones, who wrote under the pen name Marion Marigold. Angered by the government's oppression, including its censorship of The Red Prince, a book about Simon's childhood obsession with the color red whose ending of him seeing the blue sky was deemed a political statement - Mary joined the Children of Black Water, an Orinda Aries restorationist resistance group. After stealing the ruby crown of Orinda Aries in a major heist, she fled the country, hoping that Simon would discover the clues one day. Sinclair was an accomplice in the heist, and was later blackmailed by the estate's disgruntled gardener, Denny Revane, using stolen letters from Room 46. Reaching the antechamber to the 46th room allows Simon to access the estate's inner sanctum, which contains remnants of a mining operation that stumbled upon ancient Castle Orindia, the original capitol of Orinda Aries. Simon also realizes that the 46th room contains the stolen crown, though the rubies have been replaced with sapphires, making it the Crown of the Blueprints. Using the crown and other items, Simon can reclaim the original Orinda Aries throne by drafting the castle's throne room, making him the eponymous "Blue Prince". He can subsequently go on to find the secret will of the manor's original designer, Baroness Auravei.

== Development ==
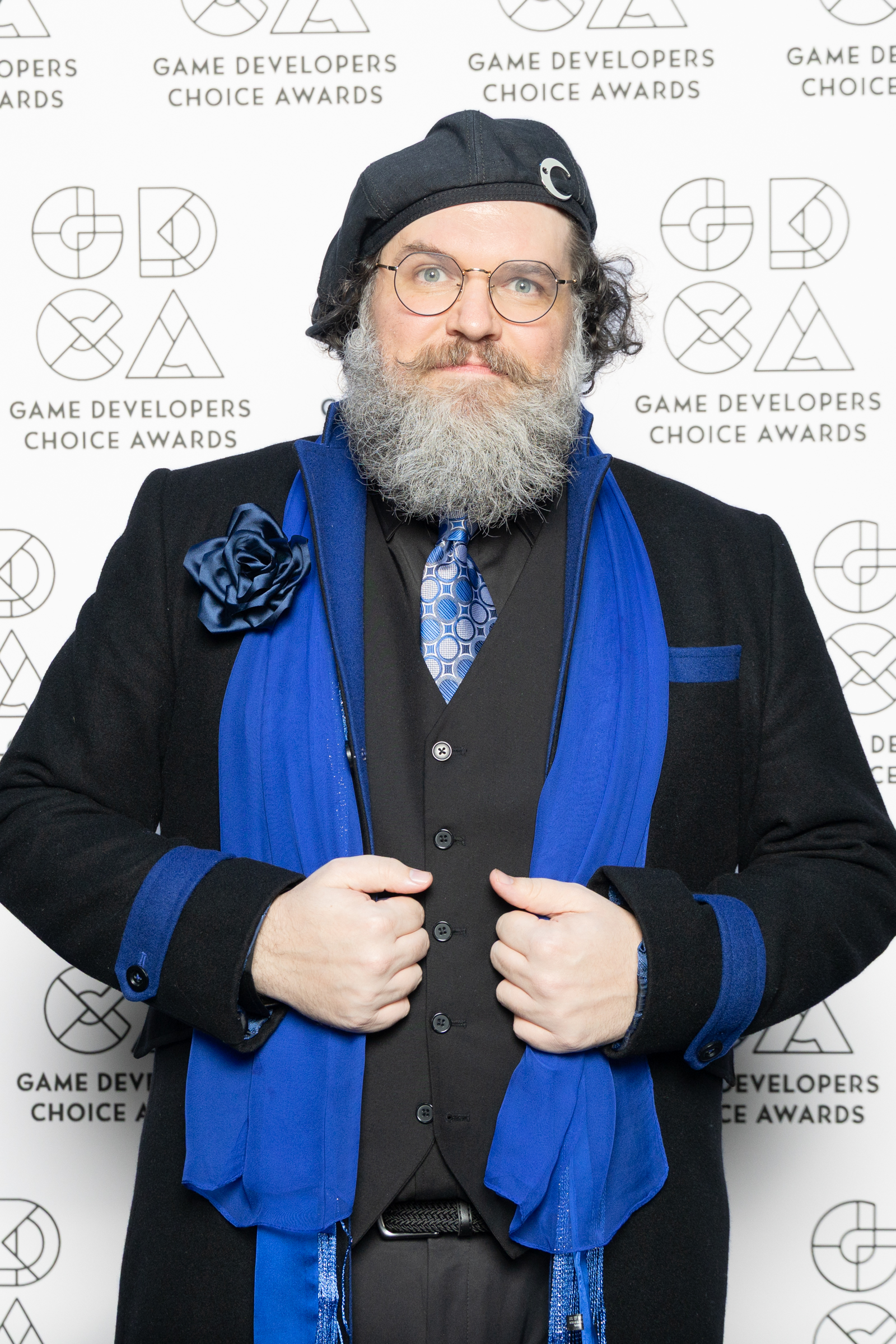
Tonda Ros, lead developer of Blue Prince, at the Game Developers Conference 2026

Blue Prince was primarily developed by Tonda Ros. Prior to development he had frequently held annual gatherings for his friends at different rental vacation homes, spending time to devise a puzzle game spanning the home based on ideas in the 1992 board game Jewels in the Attic. He had been inspired by the documentary Indie Game: The Movie, which had shown him that it was possible to create complete games with a simple toolset of development tools. After playing through the games Gone Home and The Witness, Ros became inspired to test ideas with the Unity game engine, finding development would be easier than he originally thought.

A principal influence for Ros for Blue Prince was the Maze: Solve the World's Most Challenging Puzzle by Christopher Manson, a book featuring 45 illustrated rooms that challenged the reader to find the shortest path from the entrance to the center of the maze and back out, and when first published, featured a monetary prize for those that solved it within a limited time. Maze had intrigued Ros in his youth, and he considered it a predecessor to modern day first person adventure games. Ros was able to find an online Maze group and through them contacted and commissioned Manson to develop art and one of the puzzles within Blue Prince. Other puzzles in the game were inspired by those of Martin Gardner and Raymond Smullyan. Other "armchair mystery" books contributed to Ros' ideas for Blue Prince, including Masquerade by Kit Williams. Another area of influence for Blue Prince were card and tabletop games that featured drafting, where players select a card or other token from a random pool, such as in Magic: The Gathering and Agricola. He wanted to make the puzzle solving similar to how The Legend of Zelda games would place clues to puzzle solutions in disparate locations but would not require the player to find all the clues to progress.

Around 2016, Ros started to toy with developing a prototype, intending to only spend about six months on it, but as his ideas came together, opted to quit his commercial development job to focus on the game, spending eight years to develop it further, using his private savings as well as ad revenue from a Magic: The Gathering website that he had been running. While the game was mostly developed as a one-person project, Ros also commissioned work from others, including art director Davide Pellino and the jazz duo Trigg & Gusset, to help with the atmosphere of the game. Ros had brought Pellino around two years into development to replace the base Unity assets he used to prototype the game with original art; Ros thought this effort would have taken six months, but this extended to three years to develop a unique art style for the game. The game was fully playable by 2021, after which Ros spent most of the rest of the development period balancing the game, making sure that hints to the puzzles and game's structure were presented in multiple places, as well as "widening the well" by expanding the mysteries and supporting lore that the player could find within the game.

Ros was originally planning to use the name "Bequest". However, during development, a game with that name was released on Steam. As such, Ros sought another title. He eventually settled on Blue Prince, partially due to the wordplay with "blueprints"; but it also became a theme for puzzles within the game. Ros has described using the concept of “drafting” as a double entendre, referring both to selecting a room from a random set and to drafting architectural blueprints.

Ros has no plans for a direct sequel to Blue Prince, instead considering a game set in the same universe that could stand on its own, citing the relationship between Riven and Myst as an example.

== Reception ==
Reception

Aggregate scores
Aggregator	Score
Metacritic	(PC) 92/100 (PS5) 85/100 (XSXS) 90/100
OpenCritic	95% recommend

Review scores
Publication	Score
Destructoid	8.5/10
Digital Trends	4.5/5
Edge	9/10
Eurogamer	5/5
Game Informer	9.5/10
GameSpot	9/10
GamesRadar+	4/5
IGN	9/10
PC Gamer (US)	92/100
PCGamesN	9/10
Push Square	7/10
RPGFan	90/100
Shacknews	9/10
The Guardian	5/5

Blue Prince received "critical acclaim" from critics for the PC and Xbox Series X/S versions, while the PlayStation 5 version received "generally favorable" reviews, according to review aggregator website Metacritic. At the time of release, it was the highest-rated game for 2025 based on Metacritic averages. OpenCritic determined that 95% of critics recommend the game.

In Eurogamer's five star review, Christian Donlan singled out the game keeping its secrets hidden and releasing them slowly as the most impressive aspect. "It's the pleasure of finding hidden aspects to things you thought you understood in full, the pleasure of coming back to something you thought was simple and finding that it's not simple at all." Polygon writer Maddy Myers noted the lack of colorblind support to be "a big problem", as the emphasis on colors in some of the puzzles may make the game unplayable for certain players. As of April 2026 this issue has been addressed by an accessibility update of the game. Giovanni Colantonio, also for Polygon, said that because the game only provided support for the English language, the game would have a difficult time competing in The Game Awards, due to the awards' international jury. Ros acknowledged that it would be near-impossible for his team to provide all the necessary translations, in part because several of the puzzles are based on the English language or use clues from texts in their original language, and that it would take years to complete a minimal set of localizations, equating the task to "creating a second game".

=== Accolades ===
The game was selected by Eurogamer, The Guardian, and Polygon as their Game of the Year.

Year	Award	Category	Result	Ref.
2025	Golden Joystick Awards	Ultimate Game of the Year	Nominated	
2025	Golden Joystick Awards	Best Storytelling	Nominated	
2025	Golden Joystick Awards	Best Indie Game	Won	
2025	The Game Awards 2025	Best Independent Game	Nominated	
2025	The Game Awards 2025	Best Debut Indie Game	Nominated	
2025	The Indie Game Awards	Game of the Year	Won	
2025	The Indie Game Awards	Innovation	Won	
2026	The Steam Awards 2025	Most Innovative Gameplay	Nominated	
2026	15th New York Game Awards	Big Apple Award for Best Game of the Year	Nominated	
2026	15th New York Game Awards	Off Broadway Award for Best Indie Game	Won	
2026	29th Annual D.I.C.E. Awards	Game of the Year	Nominated	
2026	29th Annual D.I.C.E. Awards	Adventure Game of the Year	Nominated	
2026	29th Annual D.I.C.E. Awards	Outstanding Achievement for an Independent Game	Won	
2026	29th Annual D.I.C.E. Awards	Outstanding Achievement in Game Direction	Nominated	
2026	29th Annual D.I.C.E. Awards	Outstanding Achievement in Game Design	Won	
2026	26th Game Developers Choice Awards	Best Debut	Nominated	
2026	26th Game Developers Choice Awards	Best Design	Won	
2026	26th Game Developers Choice Awards	Innovation Award	Won	
2026	26th Game Developers Choice Awards	Game of the Year	Nominated	
2026	22nd British Academy Games Awards	Best Game	Nominated	
2026	22nd British Academy Games Awards	Debut Game	Nominated	
2026	22nd British Academy Games Awards	Game Design	Won	
2026	22nd British Academy Games Awards	Narrative	Nominated	
2026	22nd British Academy Games Awards	Music	Longlisted	
2026	Develop:Star Awards 2026	Best Game	Nominated	
2026	Develop:Star Awards 2026	Best Game Design	Won	

=== Legacy ===
Players of Blue Prince have developed a speedrunning challenge for the game, which has been featured at venues like Games Done Quick. The challenge is based on completing various side objectives in the game, which fill in spaces on a randomized bingo-like grid based on the game's map. The goal is to complete enough spaces to connect the entrance room to the antechamber.
