= D.I.C.E. Award for Outstanding Achievement in Game Direction =

Annual award presented by the Academy of Interactive Arts & Sciences

- Country: United States
- Presented by: Academy of Interactive Arts & Sciences
- First award: 2009
- Currently held by: Clair Obscur: Expedition 33
- Website: www.interactive.org

The D.I.C.E. Award for Outstanding Achievement in Game Direction is an award presented annually by the Academy of Interactive Arts & Sciences during the D.I.C.E. Awards. This recognizes "the individual or small group of individuals who are responsible for directing and driving an interactive game and its team through a combination of skills that include vision, management execution, and game design to create a cohesive experience. This award recognizes the role of the creative director and game director - in guiding all elements of a title and shaping the final outcome of a game". Creative/technical Academy members with expertise as a game designer or producer are qualified to vote for this award.

The award's most recent winner is Clair Obscur: Expedition 33, developed by Sandfall Interactive and published by Kepler Interactive.

== Game Direction and Game of the Year ==
Since the award for Outstanding Achievement in Game Direction was first offered at the 12th Annual Interactive Achievement Awards, most of the finalists for Game Direction were also finalists for Game of the Year. In addition, most award winners for Game Direction had also won Game of the Year. The winners for Game Direction that did not win Game of the Year were:

- Red Dead Redemption
- Middle-earth: Shadow of Mordor
- Inside
- Control
- Deathloop
- Animal Well (Note: It was not nominated for Game of the Year at its awards ceremony.)

The only winners for Game of the Year that were not finalists for Game Direction were:

- Dragon Age: Inquisition
- Overwatch
- Astro Bot

2025 was the only year when none of the games nominated for Game Direction were finalists for Game of the Year.

== Winners and nominees ==
Table key
Indicates the winner

=== 2000s ===
Year	Game	Developer(s)	Publisher(s)	Ref.
2008 (12th)	LittleBigPlanet	Media Molecule	Sony Computer Entertainment	
2008 (12th)	Fallout 3	Bethesda Game Studios	Bethesda Softworks	
2008 (12th)	Gears of War 2	Epic Games	Microsoft Game Studios	
2008 (12th)	Left 4 Dead	Valve South	Valve	
2008 (12th)	Metal Gear Solid 4: Guns of the Patriots	Kojima Productions	Konami	
2009 (13th)	Uncharted 2: Among Thieves	Naughty Dog	Sony Computer Entertainment	
2009 (13th)	Assassin's Creed II	Ubisoft Montreal	Ubisoft	
2009 (13th)	Batman: Arkham Asylum	Rocksteady Studios	Warner Bros. Interactive Entertainment	
2009 (13th)	Brütal Legend	Double Fine Productions	Electronic Arts	
2009 (13th)	Flower	Thatgamecompany	Sony Computer Entertainment	

=== 2010s ===
Year	Game	Developer(s)	Publisher(s)	Ref.
2010 (14th)	Red Dead Redemption	Rockstar San Diego	Rockstar Games	
2010 (14th)	Assassin's Creed: Brotherhood	Ubisoft Montreal	Ubisoft	
2010 (14th)	Enslaved: Odyssey to the West	Ninja Theory	Namco Bandai Games	
2010 (14th)	Limbo	Playdead	Playdead	
2010 (14th)	Mass Effect 2	BioWare	Electronic Arts	
2011 (15th)	The Elder Scrolls V: Skyrim	Bethesda Game Studios	Bethesda Softworks	
2011 (15th)	Batman: Arkham City	Rocksteady Studios	Warner Bros. Interactive Entertainment	
2011 (15th)	L.A. Noire	Team Bondi	Rockstar Games	
2011 (15th)	Portal 2	Valve	Valve	
2011 (15th)	Uncharted 3: Drake's Deception	Naughty Dog	Sony Computer Entertainment	
2012 (16th)	Journey	Thatgamecompany	Sony Computer Entertainment	
2012 (16th)	Dishonored	Arkane Studios	Bethesda Softworks	
2012 (16th)	Far Cry 3	Ubisoft Montreal	Ubisoft	
2012 (16th)	The Unfinished Swan	Giant Sparrow, Santa Monica Studio	Sony Computer Entertainment	
2012 (16th)	The Walking Dead	Telltale Games	Telltale Games	
2013 (17th)	The Last of Us	Naughty Dog	Sony Computer Entertainment	
2013 (17th)	Brothers: A Tale of Two Sons	Starbreeze Studios	505 Games	
2013 (17th)	Grand Theft Auto V	Rockstar North	Rockstar Games	
2013 (17th)	Papers, Please	Lucas Pope	3909	
2013 (17th)	Tearaway	Media Molecule	Sony Computer Entertainment	
2014 (18th)	Middle-earth: Shadow of Mordor	Monolith Productions	Warner Bros. Interactive Entertainment	
2014 (18th)	Lumino City	State of Play Games	State of Play Games	
2014 (18th)	Monument Valley	ustwo	ustwo	
2014 (18th)	Never Alone (Kisima Ingitchuna)	Upper One Games	E-Line Media	
2014 (18th)	The Vanishing of Ethan Carter	The Astronauts	The Astronauts	
2015 (19th)	Fallout 4	Bethesda Game Studios	Bethesda Softworks	
2015 (19th)	Life Is Strange	Don't Nod	Square Enix Europe	
2015 (19th)	Rise of the Tomb Raider	Crystal Dynamics	Square Enix Europe	
2015 (19th)	Undertale	Toby Fox	Toby Fox	
2015 (19th)	The Witcher 3: Wild Hunt	CD Projekt Red	CD Projekt	
2016 (20th)	Inside	Playdead	Playdead	
2016 (20th)	1979 Revolution: Black Friday	iNK Stories	iNK Stories	
2016 (20th)	Battlefield 1	DICE	Electronic Arts	
2016 (20th)	The Last Guardian	Japan Studio	Sony Interactive Entertainment	
2016 (20th)	Uncharted 4: A Thief's End	Naughty Dog	Sony Interactive Entertainment	
2017 (21st)	The Legend of Zelda: Breath of the Wild	Nintendo EPD	Nintendo	
2017 (21st)	Gorogoa	Jason Roberts, Buried Signal	Annapurna Interactive	
2017 (21st)	Horizon Zero Dawn	Guerrilla Games	Sony Interactive Entertainment	
2017 (21st)	Uncharted: The Lost Legacy	Naughty Dog	Sony Interactive Entertainment	
2017 (21st)	What Remains of Edith Finch	Giant Sparrow	Annapurna Interactive	
2018 (22nd)	God of War	Santa Monica Studio	Sony Interactive Entertainment	
2018 (22nd)	Florence	Mountains	Annapurna Interactive	
2018 (22nd)	Marvel's Spider-Man	Insomniac Games	Sony Interactive Entertainment	
2018 (22nd)	Red Dead Redemption 2	Rockstar Games	Rockstar Games	
2018 (22nd)	Return of the Obra Dinn	Lucas Pope	3909	
2019 (23rd)	Control	Remedy Entertainment	505 Games	
2019 (23rd)	A Short Hike	Adam Robinson-Yu	Adam Robinson-Yu	
2019 (23rd)	Disco Elysium	ZA/UM	ZA/UM	
2019 (23rd)	Outer Wilds	Mobius Digital	Annapurna Interactive	
2019 (23rd)	Untitled Goose Game	House House	Panic Inc.	

=== 2020s ===
Year	Game	Developer(s)	Publisher(s)	Ref.
2020 (24th)	Hades	Supergiant Games	Supergiant Games	
2020 (24th)	Ghost of Tsushima	Sucker Punch Productions	Sony Interactive Entertainment	
2020 (24th)	Half-Life: Alyx	Valve	Valve	
2020 (24th)	Kentucky Route Zero	Cardboard Computer	Annapurna Interactive	
2020 (24th)	The Last of Us Part II	Naughty Dog	Sony Interactive Entertainment	
2021 (25th)	Deathloop	Arkane Studios	Bethesda Softworks	
2021 (25th)	Inscryption	Daniel Mullins Games	Devolver Digital	
2021 (25th)	It Takes Two	Hazelight Studios	Electronic Arts	
2021 (25th)	Ratchet & Clank: Rift Apart	Insomniac Games	Sony Interactive Entertainment	
2021 (25th)	The Artful Escape	Beethoven & Dinosaur	Annapurna Interactive	
2022 (26th)	Elden Ring	FromSoftware	Bandai Namco Entertainment	
2022 (26th)	God of War Ragnarök	Santa Monica Studio	Sony Interactive Entertainment	
2022 (26th)	Horizon Forbidden West	Guerrilla Games	Sony Interactive Entertainment	
2022 (26th)	Immortality	Half Mermaid Productions	Half Mermaid Productions	
2022 (26th)	Tunic	Isometricorps Games	Finji	
2023 (27th)	Baldur's Gate 3	Larian Studios	Larian Studios	
2023 (27th)	Cocoon	Geometric Interactive	Annapurna Interactive	
2023 (27th)	Marvel's Spider-Man 2	Insomniac Games	Sony Interactive Entertainment	
2023 (27th)	Super Mario Bros. Wonder	Nintendo EPD	Nintendo	
2023 (27th)	The Legend of Zelda: Tears of the Kingdom	Nintendo EPD	Nintendo	
2024 (28th)	Animal Well	Shared Memory	Bigmode	
2024 (28th)	1000xResist	Sunset Visitor	Fellow Traveller Games	
2024 (28th)	Lorelei and the Laser Eyes	Simogo	Annapurna Interactive	
2024 (28th)	Riven	Cyan Worlds	Cyan Worlds	
2024 (28th)	Thank Goodness You're Here!	Coal Supper	Panic Inc.	
2025 (29th)	Clair Obscur: Expedition 33	Sandfall Interactive	Kepler Interactive	
2025 (29th)	Blue Prince	Dogubomb	Raw Fury	
2025 (29th)	Ghost of Yōtei	Sucker Punch Productions	Sony Interactive Entertainment	
2025 (29th)	Hades II	Supergiant Games	Supergiant Games	
2025 (29th)	Kingdom Come: Deliverance II	Warhorse Studios	Deep Silver	

== Multiple nominations and wins ==
=== Developers and publishers ===
Sony has published the most nominees and the most winners, and is the only publisher with back-to-back wins. Sony's developer Naughty Dog has developed the most nominees, and is tied with Bethesda Game Studios for developing the most winners. Ubisoft Montreal and Insomniac Games are tied for developing the most nominees without a winner, while Annapurna Interactive has published the most nominees without a winner.

Developers
Developer	Nominations	Wins
Naughty Dog	6	2
Bethesda Game Studios	3	2
Nintendo EPD	3	1
Santa Monica Studio	3	1
Arkane Studios	2	1
Media Molecule	2	1
Playdead	2	1
Supergiant Games	2	1
Thatgamecompany	2	1
Insomniac Games	3	0
Ubisoft Montreal	3	0
Giant Sparrow	2	0
Guerrilla Games	2	0
Lucas Pope	2	0
Rocksteady Studios	2	0
Sucker Punch Productions	2	0
Valve	2	0

Publishers
Publisher	Nominations	Wins
Sony Computer/Interactive Entertainment	21	5
Bethesda Softworks	5	3
Rockstar Games	4	1
Nintendo	3	1
Warner Bros. Interactive Entertainment	3	1
505 Games	2	1
Bandai Namco Entertainment	2	1
Supergiant Games	2	1
Annapurna Interactive	8	0
Electronic Arts	4	0
Ubisoft	3	0
Valve	3	0
3909	2	0
Panic Inc.	2	0
Square Enix Europe	2	0

=== Franchises ===
Only twelve franchises have been nominated more than once, with none being repeat winners. Uncharted has been the most nominated franchise in this category.

Franchises
Franchise	Nominations	Wins
Uncharted	4	1
Fallout	2	1
God of War	2	1
Hades	2	1
The Last of Us	2	1
The Legend of Zelda	2	1
Red Dead	2	1
Assassin's Creed	2	0
Batman: Arkham	2	0
Ghost	2	0
Horizon	2	0
Marvel's Spider-Man	2	0
