= Gorogoa =

2017 puzzle video game

- Developer: Jason Roberts
- Publisher: Annapurna Interactive
- Composer: Joel Corelitz
- Engine: Unity
- Platforms: Microsoft Windows iOS; Nintendo Switch; PlayStation 4 Xbox One; Android
- Release: Microsoft Windows, iOS, Nintendo Switch; 14 December 2017; PlayStation 4, Xbox One; 22 May 2018; Android; 19 June 2018
- Genre: Puzzle
- Mode: Single-player

Gorogoa is a 2017 puzzle video game developed by Jason Roberts and published by Annapurna Interactive. The game was released for Microsoft Windows, Nintendo Switch, and iOS on 14 December 2017, PlayStation 4 and Xbox One on 22 May 2018, and shortly thereafter an Android and Kindle Fire release.

Gorogoa has the player manipulate images placed in a two-by-two grid, exploring within each image as well as placing or stacking images relative to others, to solve puzzles. The game, solely developed by Roberts, started as a failed attempt at an interactive graphic novel, and took nearly six years to complete.

== Gameplay ==
Puzzles in Gorogoa involve manipulating the scenes within each of the panels, as well as moving the panels around themselves to connect them up and create new scenes.

In Gorogoa players are presented with up to four images in a two-by-two grid. Most images can be manipulated on their own, such as zooming in or out from the image, or panning across the image. The player can also move the image to any of the other grid spaces. In some cases, the image presents a hole such as a doorway, so when moved onto a different image, the moved image becomes a mask to cover the existing image, creating a new image. Through this method, the player must stack, combine, and explore each image to find a connection between them in order to advance and open new areas. Players are not guided through the process, as the game contains no language, and must work out what they need to do to finish each level, though when the player has successfully completed a connection, the images will briefly animate on their own, showcasing their result to the player.

The plot involves a boy seeking an encounter with a divine monster, exploring themes of spirituality and religion. The scenes in the game follow periods of time in the 19th and 20th centuries, including love, peace, war, and rebuilding, and the life of the boy as a survivor of war, living through the rebuilding, and then reflecting on his past as an old man.

== Story ==
Through the puzzles, the player guides a boy as they encounter a strange monster among a landscape that becomes war-ravaged and then rebuilt. The boy grows older and ends up as an old man reflecting on his past.

== Development ==
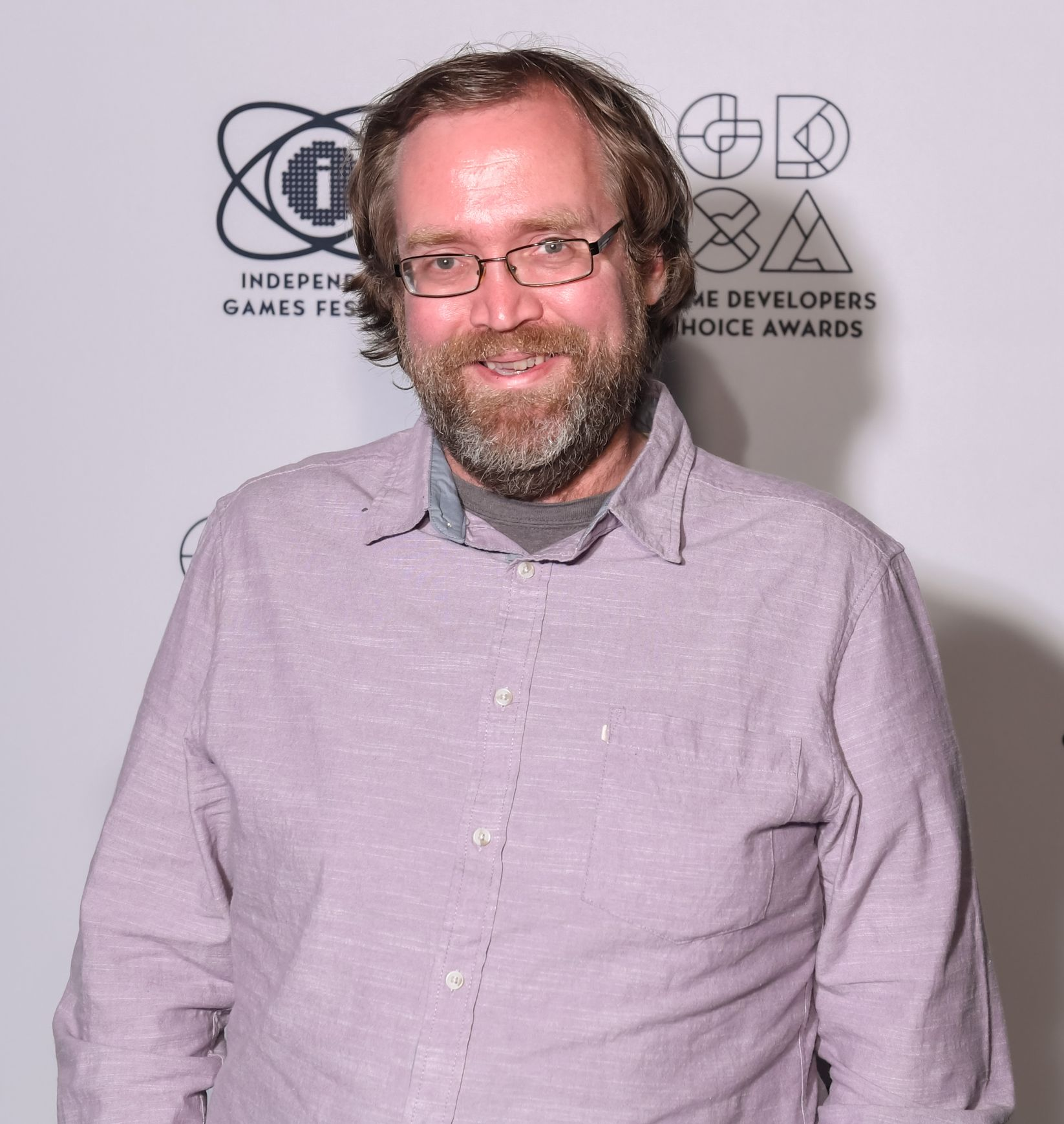
Roberts at the 2018 Game Developers Conference

Jason Roberts began development of a card game inspired by interactive comics in his spare time while working full-time, but later decided the style was too complex. Roberts considered writing a graphic novel, but following the success of indie games such as Braid, he realised he could combine his love of art and interactive video games, despite knowing very little about how to develop them. Development on the game began in 2011, with Roberts quitting his full-time job to focus on the game. Originally planned for release in 2013, Roberts ran out of money two years after starting development. He was able to fund his work for another year through investment from Indie Fund, and in December 2016 Annapurna Pictures announced that it would begin publishing games as Annapurna Interactive, with Gorogoa being one of its first published games.

Roberts adopted the title Gorogoa from a name he invented for an imaginary creature in his youth. He chose it for the game because it was not part of any existing language, wanting the game to be accessible to anyone, regardless of language, and therefore also choosing not to add any to the game.

Gorogoa was originally written in a custom-built game engine created by Roberts in Java, but was ultimately ported to the Unity game engine by Wholesale Algorithms so that it could be more easily distributed on multiple platforms, including the Nintendo Switch. All illustrations are hand drawn by Roberts. Roberts cites David Roberts, Gustave Doré, Christopher Manson, and Chris Ware as influences to his art style. Roberts also stated that his illustration style was indirectly influenced by Byzantine art, due to travels to Istanbul and other similar locations. Roberts found such two-dimensional art challenged him of how to explore that within three dimensional spaces within his puzzles. Further, it helped to suggest a world with a similar history to the real world. The game's audio, for the first few years of development, was composed by Austin Wintory, until Roberts decided he wanted a different style and instead hired Joel Corelitz, who also composed the audio for 2012 video game The Unfinished Swan. Eduardo Ortiz Frau is the game's sound designer. The score is a composite of audio from each panel currently viewed by the player.

The game was revealed at the 2012 IndieCade, with a demo version released shortly afterwards, and was released in full in December 2017. Roberts says the game took much longer to develop than he anticipated, in part because as his drawing skills grew he kept going back to re-draw earlier scenes. He also scrapped and recreated large completed sections of the game multiple times during development.

== Reception ==
Reception

Aggregate scores
Aggregator	Score
Metacritic	PC: 84/100; NS: 83/100 iOS: 91/100; XONE: 80/100
OpenCritic	91% recommend

Review scores
Publication	Score
Destructoid	9/10
Edge	9/10
Game Informer	6/10
GameSpot	8/10
IGN	8.5/10
Nintendo Life	9/10
Nintendo World Report	8.5/10
PlayStation Official Magazine – UK	9/10
PC Gamer (US)	85/100
Pocket Gamer	5/5
TouchArcade	5/5

=== Critical response ===
Prior to release, Gorogoa won the Visual Design Award at the 2012 IndieCade, and in 2013 won the Good Game Club top prize. The game also won the 2014 Independent Games Festival Excellence in Visual Art award for which it also received honorable mentions in the Design and Narrative categories.

Following the full release of the game, it received generally positive reviews from critics, holding a score of 84/100 on PC and 91/100 on iOS on Metacritic. Reviewers particularly praised Gorogoa's illustrations and graphics. Sam Machkovech of Ars Technica described the game as the "prettiest hand-drawn, hand-illustrated video game ever made", and Philippa Warr, writing for PC Gamer, called it "utterly beautiful".

Writing for The Verge, Andrew Webster praised the game's lack of frustration, rarely finding himself stuck or unable to progress with a puzzle as a result of the game's design, a sentiment echoed by Warr. In VentureBeat's review, Stephanie Chan praised the game's accessibility and the satisfaction of completing the puzzles. Rob Kershaw at Jump Dash Roll agreed, writing that Gorogoa was "beautifully illustrated" and "a marvel of game design". Machkovech, though, found some annoyance with puzzles which didn't have a clear solution process.

At two to three hours, the game's length was described as "short-and-sweet" by Machkovech, albeit wishing it was longer. Some reviewers, such as Warr, expressed a desire to play through the game multiple times to digest the story.

=== Awards and accolades ===
Eurogamer ranked Gorogoa 49th on its list of the "Top 50 Games of 2017", while Polygon ranked it 35th on their list of the 50 best games of 2017. The game was nominated for "Best Mobile Game", "Best Puzzle Game", and "Most Innovative" in IGN's Best of 2017 Awards. Polygon named the game among the decade's best.

Year	Awards	Category	Result	Ref.
2017	Game Developers Choice Awards	Best Mobile Game	Won	
2017	Game Developers Choice Awards	Innovation Award	Won	
2017	Game Developers Choice Awards	Best Debut	Nominated	
2018	21st Annual D.I.C.E. Awards	D.I.C.E. Sprite Award	Nominated	
2018	21st Annual D.I.C.E. Awards	Mobile Game of the Year	Nominated	
2018	21st Annual D.I.C.E. Awards	Outstanding Achievement in Game Direction	Nominated	
2018	21st Annual D.I.C.E. Awards	Outstanding Achievement in Game Design	Nominated	
2018	17th Annual National Academy of Video Game Trade Reviewers Awards (NAVGTR Awards)	Game Design	Nominated	
2018	17th Annual National Academy of Video Game Trade Reviewers Awards (NAVGTR Awards)	New IP	Nominated	
2018	14th British Academy Games Awards	Debut Game	Won	
2018	14th British Academy Games Awards	Artistic Achievement	Nominated	
2018	14th British Academy Games Awards	Game Innovation	Nominated	
2018	14th British Academy Games Awards	Mobile Game	Nominated	
2018	14th British Academy Games Awards	Original Property	Nominated	
2018	Golden Joystick Awards	Best Storytelling	Nominated	
2018	Golden Joystick Awards	Best Visual Design	Nominated	
2018	Golden Joystick Awards	Best Indie Game	Nominated	
2018	Golden Joystick Awards	Mobile Game of the Year	Nominated	
2018	SXSW Gaming Awards	Excellence in Art	Nominated	
2018	SXSW Gaming Awards	Mobile Game of the Year	Nominated	
