= Legendary Gary =

2018 video game

- Steam version header art
- Developer: Evan Rogers
- Publisher: Evan Rogers
- Platform: Windows
- Release: 20 February 2018
- Genre: Adventure
- Mode: Single-player

Legendary Gary is a 2018 video game created by independent developer Evan Rogers. Rogers was previously a programmer on the 2017 Giant Sparrow adventure game What Remains of Edith Finch. The game is an adventure game about the titular main character's engagement with a fictional role-playing game, Legend of the Spear, and the emerging parallels between the game and his real life. It was released on 20 February 2018.

== Plot ==
Gary is an average man who lives an unremarkable life, living with his mother and working at a supermarket. At night, he plays the role-playing game Legend of the Spear on his computer, featuring a cast of characters that resemble Gary's few friends and family members. Gary's personal life involves many difficult issues, as he confronts several crises being faced by himself and the people in his life, including his mother, his partner, and his friends. Over time, the boundaries between Gary's personal life and the world within Legend of the Spear begin to blur in complex and unexpected ways.

== Gameplay ==
A screenshot of Legendary Gary, depicting combat in Legend of the Spear.

Legendary Gary is an adventure game separated into two sections of gameplay. The main gameplay comprises sessions playing Legend of the Spear, which imitates the mechanics of a role-playing game. Players explore a fantasy world and engage in turn-based combat on a hexagonal grid with a party of team members. Combat involves the use of attacks to deplete enemy hit points and abilities that cost special points. Contrary to combat in conventional turn-based role-playing games, Legend of the Spear resolves all player and enemy attacks simultaneously once committed by the player. The secondary gameplay involves the player guiding Gary's personal life outside of Legend of the Spear, making choices through dialog.

== Development ==
An announcement trailer for Legendary Gary was released by Evan Rogers on 29 November 2017. The preview received positive reception, with Robert Purchese of Eurogamer remarking that the game "looks quite good", noting "the wry tone and self-awareness, not to mention (the) synth soundtrack - keep Legendary Gary afloat."

== Reception ==
Reception

Aggregate scores
Aggregator	Score
Metacritic	78/100
OpenCritic	80% recommend

Review scores
Publication	Score
Punished Backlog	8/10
Twinfinite	4/5

Legendary Gary received "generally favorable" reviews from video game critics, according to review aggregator website Metacritic. Praise was directed towards the game's narrative and the theme of interaction between fantasy and reality in the video game medium. Jake Green of Rock Paper Shotgun stated the game presented a rather touching tale about how games can offer much-needed escapism, but how ultimately, they cannot stand in for real-life relationships." Alice Bell of Video Gamer stated the narrative was "pleasantly, frighteningly familiar" and praised the realism of the writing.

Critics were more divided on the implementation of the role-playing mechanics in the Legend of the Spear section of the game. Geron Graham of The Punished Backlog stated the combat was a "mostly engrossing affair despite never providing much challenge", noting "the system is forgiving to the point of undermining itself altogether" and ultimately felt he was "just going through the motions" of combat. Writing for Twinfinite, Jake Green noted "the combat mostly serves as a way to break up the story so the choice to keep it relatively friendly and quick is a smart one, managing to keep the pace up where it might otherwise have fallen," although finding "no real challenge" in this section of the game. Alice Bell of Video Gamer stated that "for the most part (the combat is) fun, and not too taxing, though some of the very end-game fights become a frustrating exercise in trial and error."
