= Maze: Solve the World's Most Challenging Puzzle =

1985 puzzle book by Christopher Manson

- Original cover with contest label
- Author: Christopher Manson
- Illustrator: Christopher Manson
- Language: English
- Subject: Puzzle book
- Genre: Games, Puzzles
- Publisher: Henry Holt and Company
- Publication date: 1985
- Publication place: United States
- Media type: Paperback
- ISBN: 0-8050-1088-2

Maze: Solve the World's Most Challenging Puzzle (1985, Henry Holt and Company) is a puzzle book written and illustrated by Christopher Manson. The book was originally published as part of a contest to win $10,000.

Each page of the book represents a room or space in a hypothetical house, and each room leads to other "rooms" in this "house". Part of the puzzle involves reaching the center of the house, Room #45 (page 45 in the book), and back to Room #1 in only sixteen steps. Some rooms lead to circuitous loops; others lead nowhere. This gives the puzzle the feel of a maze or labyrinth.

The book was adapted as the computer game Riddle of the Maze in 1994 by Interplay. This version featured full color illustrations and voice-overs for the narrator.

The contest has been void since 1987, and the book is long out of print. Used copies sell in the $250 range as of 2025.

== Puzzle ==
Manson described the book as "not really a book", but "a building in the shape of a book . . . a maze", whereby "Each numbered page depicts a room in the maze". There are 45 rooms in the maze, each represented by a page in the book. Doors in each room lead to other rooms. With this structure established, Manson challenges readers to solve three tasks: to journey from Room #1 to Room #45 and back to Room #1 in only sixteen steps, to interpret the riddle hidden in Room #45 based on visual and verbal clues, and to find the solution to this riddle hidden along the shortest possible path found in the first task.

== Contest ==
A contest to win $10,000 was released with the book in October, 1985. The contest ended September 1, 1987, which was an extension of the original contest deadline. In early January 1988, Ventura Associates, Inc. sent a letter to the winners of the contest stating that twelve entrants "were equally close to guessing the correct solutions". The $10,000 prize was split between these twelve, all of whom discovered the correct path, but not the solution to the riddle.

Until November 1, 1987, Ventura Associates sent one or two letters containing clues to the riddle found in Room #45 on request.

== Reviews ==
- Games #72

== Legacy ==
The book was a major influence on the 2025 video game Blue Prince; Manson himself contributed some minor parts to the game.

The four pieces of artwork found in Blue Prince's gallery are attributed to Christopher Manson. Each piece of artwork has a plaque to its left, featuring four rows reading: "Christopher Manson (b. 1954)", the name of each painting (dynamic based on player input), "Acrylic and Oil on Canvas", and "Collection of Mt. Holly" from top to bottom.

The gallery also features two statues, each supporting a chest using their back. This may be a nod to the riddle of Maze: Solve the World's Most Challenging Puzzle and its solution.

== See also ==
- The House of Asterion by Jorge Luis Borges. A short story with the same twist on the Greek myth of Theseus and the Minotaur from 1947.
