= Joel Corelitz =

American composer

- Born: Chicago, Illinois, United States
- Genres: Sound design; video game music; classical; electronic; film score
- Occupation: Composer
- Years active: 2012–present
- Website: joelcorelitz.com

Joel Corelitz is an American composer and sound designer. He is best known for his work on The Unfinished Swan which garnered him a BAFTA nomination for Best Music. His other works include Gorogoa, Death Stranding and Halo Infinite.

== Life and career ==
Having grown up in the late 1980s, Corelitz developed an interest for sounds and electronic music at the age of five. He later attended Oberlin Conservatory of Music pursuing a Major in Technology in Music and Related Arts. Before his foray into video games, Corelitz had worked on various commercials with composition studio, Steve Ford Music. He later set up his own studio, Waveplant Studios, dedicated to creating soundscapes and music for visual mediums and installations.

His breakthrough would come in 2012 when Sony Interactive Entertainment approached him to compose for The Unfinished Swan. Speaking about his process on the game, he said that "We wanted the music to serve as a companion for Monroe and the player as they explored the world of the game." With that in mind, Corelitz based the score around an assortment of strings and percussion which included harps, violins and marimbas mixed with electronic elements. He noted that "The music is not just background noise, it's part of the world, it's part of how you feel, how the character feels."

In 2017, Corelitz was hired by Ludvig Forssell, composer for Death Stranding to assist him in creating sounds for the game. In order to do this, the duo went to Home Depot to gather tools and random objects for use in recording. They recorded various metallic, rustic and unearthly sounds in a three day session with Forssell also integrating the sounds into his score. Corelitz also experimented with a prepared piano which he calls "..the ultimate percussion instrument". He struck piano strings with various objects like a rubber mallet and a sledgehammer producing a string sound that was "dominant". The collaboration later led Corelitz to write additional music citing the studio's preference to "keep things fresh and different".

In 2020, Corelitz was announced as one of three composers on Halo Infinite, along with Curtis Schweitzer and Gareth Coker.

== Discography ==
Video games
Year	Title	Developer(s)	Notes
2012	The Unfinished Swan	Giant Sparrow	Nominated — BATFA Game Award for Best Music
2014	Hohokum	Honeyslug	Additional music
2016	The Tomorrow Children	Japan Studio; Q-Games	Discontinued in November 2017
2017	TumbleSeed	Greg Wohlwend; Benedit Fritz	
2017	Gorogoa	Jason Roberts	Replaced Austin Wintory
2018	Death Stranding	Kojima Productions	Main score composed by Ludvig Forssell; Additional music / Sound designer
2021	Eastward	Pixpil	
2021	Halo Infinite	343 Industries	Composed with Curtis Schweitzer and Gareth Coker
2022	The Last Clockwinder	Pontoco	
2023	The Murder of Sonic the Hedgehog	Sega	Composed with Troupe Gammage
2024	Eastward: Octopia	Pixpil	
