= Halo Infinite =

2021 video game

- Developer: 343 Industries (Note: Additional work by Atomhawk, Certain Affinity, SkyBox Labs, Sperasoft, and The Coalition)
- Publisher: Xbox Game Studios
- Composers: Gareth Coker; Joel Corelitz; Curtis Schweitzer; Alex Bhore
- Series: Halo
- Engine: Slipspace
- Platforms: Windows; Xbox One; Xbox Series X/S
- Release: December 8, 2021
- Genre: First-person shooter
- Modes: Single-player, multiplayer

Halo Infinite is a 2021 first-person shooter game developed by 343 Industries and published by Xbox Game Studios. It is the sixth mainline installment in the Halo series, following Halo 5: Guardians (2015). The game's campaign follows the human supersoldier Master Chief and his fight against a mercenary organization, known as the Banished, on the Forerunner ringworld Zeta Halo. Unlike previous mainline entries in the series, the multiplayer portion of the game is free-to-play.

Infinite was intended to release as a launch title for the Xbox Series X/S, but was delayed in August 2020 after its gameplay reveal in July 2020 drew negative feedback from both critics and Halo fans. Following an open beta release of the multiplayer component on November 15, 2021, coinciding with the franchise's 20th anniversary, the campaign was released on December 8, 2021, for Windows, Xbox One, and Xbox Series X/S.

Halo Infinite received generally favorable reviews from critics, who deemed it a return to form for the series, with praise for the visuals, gameplay, open world design, soundtrack, and story.

== Gameplay ==
In this screenshot, Master Chief is infiltrating Ransom Keep, one of the game's outposts.

Halo Infinite is a first-person shooter. In the game's story mode, players assume the role of player character Master Chief, as he wages a war against the Banished, an alien faction. Players traverse the setting of the ringworld Zeta Halo, fighting the Banished with a mixture of vehicles and weapons. Players also have access to special equipment, such as the Grappleshot, which pulls Chief towards foes, retrieves items, or help to traverse the terrain.

The campaign mode's semi-open world structure allows players to freely explore parts of Zeta Halo, which are segmented off from each other and initially impassable. Scattered across the environment are Forward Operating Bases (FOBs), which can be captured once cleared of enemies. Captured bases serve as fast-travel points. Other points of interest found across Zeta Halo's surface include "high-value targets" to eliminate, Marine squads to rescue, and Banished propaganda towers to destroy. Completing these side objectives earns the player Valor, which is used to earn weapons and vehicles that players can call in from FOBs. The more linear environments within the ring's surface hew more to traditional Halo mission design. These missions serve to advance the story, and can be replayed once completed via the in-game TACMAP. Collectibles found in the environment, such as audio logs, provide additional story details.

Infinite's multiplayer component features deathmatch, capture the flag, and other modes played in standard 4-versus-4 and Big Team Battle variants; the latter bumps the player count in matches up to 24. Ability pickups allow players to activate special powers a limited number of times. Powers include dashing, active camouflage, and "repulsor" charges that can knock enemies, projectiles, and vehicles back. A training mode allows players to test weapons in weapon drills, or play against computer-controlled bot players in practice matches. Players customize their player avatars through armor customization, color and pattern groups called coatings, and different weapon models. These are unlocked through finding them in the campaigns, through free or paid battle passes, and through micro transactions.

== Synopsis ==
=== Setting and characters ===
Halo Infinite is set in the year 2560. During the events of Halo 5: Guardians, the human artificial intelligence Cortana and allied artificial intelligences (AIs) rebel against their creators, the United Nations Space Command (UNSC). Taking control of ancient Forerunner weapons known as Guardians, Cortana subjugates the galaxy. Also fighting against Cortana and the UNSC are the Banished, a mercenary organization composed of aliens and humans led by the Brute Atriox. The game is set on the Forerunner ringworld Installation 07 (Zeta Halo), which has mysteriously suffered damage. The player character, Master Chief Petty Officer John-117 is a UNSC "Spartan" supersoldier on a mission to neutralize Cortana, his former partner.

In addition to the narrative told in the campaign, Halo Infinite's multiplayer component features a seasonal story that centers on Spartan Commander Laurette Agryna's efforts to lead a new generation of Spartan supersoldiers in the aftermath of Cortana's attacks on various UNSC military strongholds.

=== Plot ===
In December 2559, the UNSC ship Infinity arrives at Halo Installation 07. Upon arrival, the ship is ambushed by several dreadnoughts that are operated by the Banished. While defending the ship's hangar bay from multiple raiding parties, the Master Chief is caught off-guard by Atriox, the leader of the Banished, and is subsequently defeated in a one-on-one duel. Atriox throws the Chief from the edge of the hangar bay, leaving him stranded in space.

Six months later, a UNSC pilot recovers the Chief adrift in space. While the Pilot wants to flee, Master Chief insists on continuing the fight against the Banished. The Chief and Pilot travel to Zeta Halo, which has been severely damaged by an unknown calamity. On the ring, Master Chief locates the Weapon, an AI designed to imitate Cortana in order to capture her for deletion. While the Weapon states that she was successful in her mission, she has failed to self-delete as per her directives. Master Chief retrieves the Weapon, and experiences visions of Cortana's memories and thoughts left as residual data.

Zeta Halo is controlled by the Banished, now led by Atriox's lieutenant Escharum after Atriox's apparent death. The dying Brute is invigorated to have Master Chief as his final opponent. Master Chief, the Weapon, and a reluctant Pilot rally scattered UNSC forces on the ring's surface, while looking for any Spartans that haven't been picked off by The Hand of Atriox, Escharum's team of Spartan killers. Inside the Forerunner installation known as the Conservatory, Master Chief encounters Despondent Pyre, the AI caretaker of Zeta Halo. Despondent Pyre attempts to warn Master Chief of a threat contained on the installation, but is destroyed by the Harbinger, an alien awoken by the Banished. The Harbinger claims that her people, the Endless, were imprisoned by the Forerunners on Zeta Halo. She has allied herself with the Banished in order to rebuild the Silent Auditorium, a facility that will allow her to free her people. The Banished, in turn, will use the repaired Halo as a weapon against humanity.

Master Chief defends the Pilot from a duo of Spartan killers deployed by Escharum. The Pilot reveals that he was a civilian engineer aboard Infinity who stole a Pelican to flee the battle. The Chief comforts him, admitting his own guilt over his failure to save Cortana. Master Chief and the Weapon stop Zeta Halo's repair process by disabling a series of spires on the ring, but are unable to stop a section of the Auditorium from being rebuilt. When the Harbinger attempts to hack the Weapon, the Chief activates a failsafe to delete the AI. The Weapon repels the Harbinger and deactivates the failsafe, angrily asking why Master Chief does not trust her. After seeing a vision in which Cortana uses the Guardians to destroy the Brutes' home planet of Doisac, the Weapon realizes that she is a copy of Cortana, and insists that Master Chief delete her so she does not become like her predecessor; Master Chief refuses, stating that he wants to trust her. The Pilot is captured by Jega 'Rdomnai, an Elite Spartan killer and a close friend of Escharum, as bait for Master Chief. Unwilling to let the Pilot die, Master Chief infiltrates the Banished facility and saves him, defeating Jega 'Rdomnai and Escharum in the process.

Master Chief and the Weapon rush to the Auditorium to stop the Harbinger. The two learn that Cortana was captured by Atriox after the Weapon locked her down; upon realizing that Atriox intended to access the ring's secrets, Cortana destroyed herself, damaged Zeta Halo, and prevented the Weapon from being deleted. In a recorded message, Cortana says goodbye to the Chief and encourages him to work with the Weapon. The Chief defeats the Harbinger, but is unable to stop her from contacting someone regarding the Endless. Afterwards, the Weapon and Chief reunite with the Pilot, who reveals his name is Fernando Esparza. The Weapon decides to choose a name for herself.

In a post-credits scene, the surviving Atriox uses a key to unlock a sealed door, leading to the Endless. If the game is finished on Legendary difficulty, the scene features dialogue between Despondent Pyre and a Forerunner official about the imprisonment of the Endless. When Despondent Pyre states that she cannot oversee the study of the Endless alone, the Forerunner replies that the AI Offensive Bias has been deployed to assist her.

== Development ==
Developer 343 Industries produced Halo 4 (2012) and Halo 5: Guardians (2015) as part of the "Reclaimer Saga", a series of games initially planned as a trilogy. Halo Infinite was developed by 343 Industries with assistance from SkyBox Labs, Sperasoft, The Coalition, Certain Affinity and Atomhawk.

The studio played with the idea of making Halo an open world game, drawing inspiration from other video games such as The Legend of Zelda: Breath of the Wild, with the idea of allowing to explore a large open area, with the freedom of completing the game in any order.

While reception to Halo 5 was overall positive, the campaign received criticism for not including enough of Master Chief; 343 Industries promised to refocus on the character going forward.

It utilizes the new Slipspace Engine. The game was written by Paul Crocker, who was also associate creative director of the campaign. Justin Dinges and Nicolas Bouvier were chosen as artists. The multiplayer component of the game was directed by Tom French, Associate Creative Director of multiplayer, and Pierre Hintze, Project Lead and Partner Head of multiplayer. The tools used for the Slipspace Engine used basic development tools called Faber. Some parts of Faber dated back to the early 2000s, having also been used for Bungie's Halo games. As a result, its coding became notoriously difficult to use by 343 Industries, being considered technical debt. 343 Industries had also excessively relied on hiring contract workers to the point of making up half the studio according to estimates. Due to Microsoft's policy that limits contract workers to keep their jobs for up to 18 months, the number of workers at 343 Industries gradually fell.

Halo Infinite was beset by further issues during development. The game suffered from creative instability for some time; the studio was described to be split into "fiefdoms", and that the struggle to complete the game and the conflicting decisions resulted in "four or five games being developed simultaneously." Two-thirds of the planned game was cut by summer 2019, which severely removed some of the initial vision. Despite this, the planned deadline of November 2020 to be a launch game for the Xbox Series X/S was decided to be impossible to meet. Development director Frank O'Connor stated in August 2019 that Halo Infinite was being built "so it plays and looks fantastic" on Xbox One, but would have enhancements when played on Xbox Series X/S.

Following the campaign gameplay reveal for Halo Infinite on July 23, 2020, publications and audiences expressed disappointment over the graphics and performance. Eurogamer wrote that "Halo Infinite looks like the fake plastic trees version of Halo, like a video game designed with Mega Bloks in mind. It pops in all the wrong places. [...] It doesn't feel grounded. It doesn't feel like it has depth. It feels, well, surface level, smooth and uninteresting." Aaron Greenberg, general manager of Xbox marketing, responded in an interview with Inside Gaming: "Listen, we're in the middle of a global pandemic. It's July, we're far from [launch in] Holiday, you're seeing a work-in-progress game." He said that the final game would be a "visual showcase". Narrative experience director Dan Chosich tweeted: "I want you to know your voice matters + is heard [...] I always want to live up to the legacy that Bungie pioneered. I personally care a lot about honoring that."

A screenshot from the gameplay reveal in July 2020, demonstrating a Brute (nicknamed "Craig") being attacked

A screenshot of the gameplay showing an attacking Brute with a deadpan expression, given the moniker "Craig" by internet commenters, became an internet meme, and was embraced by 343 Industries' community director Brian Jarrard. When 343 Industries released improved gameplay videos closer to Halo Infinite's release, they included shots that purposely showed an improvement in visuals and appearance of "Craig", which character and combat director Steve Dyck and character art lead Bryan Repka considered a "glow-up", and that the community response to "Craig" was "one of the factors in gaining some more time to finish work and get Brutes to a place where the team is happy with them". A reference to "Craig" in the form of an Easter egg was added to Halo Infinite's campaign.

The gameplay reveal on July 23, 2020, saw criticism from the gaming community for the game's visual quality, which saw further changes to development. On August 27, 2020, 343 Industries announced that Joseph Staten, the former lead writer and cinematic director of the Halo series at Bungie, had joined as Campaign Project Lead for Halo Infinite. 343 Industries later announced that Staten's role had changed to Head of Creative for Halo Infinite. Staten had convinced Microsoft to delay the game to 2021 in order to release a stable launch. He had provided a list of reasons why the game would be better if the deadline was pushed. When the game was delayed, features were added and improved, including the graphics. On October 28, 2020, Bloomberg News reported that (now former) Studio Head Chris Lee had departed the project.

Halo Infinite was intended to have split-screen campaign co-op in response to the backlash of its removal in Halo 5: Guardians, but the feature was delayed several times and was ultimately cancelled by September 2022. The game supports both cross-platform play and cross-platform save progression between Xbox and Windows versions. Campaign network co-op was eventually included as part of the Winter Update in November 2022 along with several other features, including the ability to replay old missions via the in-game TACMAP, which was absent from the game's release.

=== Music ===
Halo 5 in-house composer Kazuma Jinnouchi left 343 Industries in 2018 to pursue an independent career. The music for Halo Infinite was a collaboration between Gareth Coker, Curtis Schweitzer, Joel Corelitz, Alex Bhore, and Eternal Time & Space, overseen by 343 Industries Music Supervisor Joel Yarger. Infinite's soundtrack was released digitally on December 8, 2021, in two albums, one covering the score for the campaign, and another covering the music for the game's multiplayer component. An additional soundtrack album, featuring music written for Infinite's post-launch seasons, was released on February 23, 2024.

== Release ==
Halo Infinite was announced in a trailer at E3 2018 with its release confirmed, at the time, for Xbox One and Windows. The developer said that all of the scenes in the trailer were running in-engine. During E3 2018 it was confirmed that Infinite was planned to have a beta prior to its release, described as an insider flight program.

At E3 2019 the following year, Halo Infinite was confirmed that it would be a launch game for the next-generation Xbox consoles. In January 2020, Xbox Game Studios head Matt Booty confirmed that the studio had no immediate plans for Xbox Series X exclusives at launch, preferring to phase out compatibility with older hardware over a longer period, similar to PCs. The COVID-19 pandemic forced developers to remote work.

After the Xbox Games Showcase on July 23, 2020, 343 Studio Head Chris Lee stated that a public beta was unlikely due to the impact of the ongoing pandemic, despite Microsoft stating at E3 2018 that there would be a public beta ahead of launch. 343 Industries said that the game would receive a free ray tracing update post-launch. On July 31, 2020, it was announced that the game's multiplayer portion would be released as a free-to-play game.

On August 11, 2020, it was announced that the game had been delayed to an undefined date in 2021, due to a range of factors impacting development, including the COVID-19 pandemic. Microsoft initially planned to split the game into several parts but ultimately decided against it. It was reported that 343 Industries was heavily outsourcing the game to external developers, resulting in development troubles, and was a contributing factor to the delay. Speaking to IGN, a spokesperson for 343 Industries denied that the Halo TV show was having an impact on Halo Infinite's development, but IGN stated that "the spokesperson did not speak to the report's claim that 'a significant portion of the game is being outsourced to third-party contractors.'"

In December 2020, 343 Industries announced Halo Infinite would be released in late 2021, later giving a December 8, 2021, release date.

A technical test for the multiplayer portion of the game ran from July 29 – August 2, 2021, where select members of the Halo Insider Program could compete in teams across three maps against bots in 4v4 Slayer mode. On August 20, 2021, it was announced that the game would be launching without campaign co-op, a longtime feature of the series. It was also announced that Forge, a creative environment where players could design their own maps and gametypes, would not be available at launch. On August 25, 2021, Infinite was announced to be releasing on December 8, 2021. Additional testing "flights" ran September 23–26 and September 30 – October 3, with the first round centered around 4v4 player-versus-player multiplayer, and the second introducing 12v12 Big Team Battle on the larger map Fragmentation. 343 used player feedback during the flights to make changes to the game before release.

On October 25, 2021, 343 Industries published a video depicting the game's campaign mode for the first time since its initial panned debut in July 2020; the footage offers a first look into several previously untold aspects of the mode's gameplay and plot.

On November 15, 2021, an open beta of Halo Infinite's multiplayer aspect was released on Windows, Xbox One and Xbox Series X/S in celebration of the Xbox and the Halo series' 20th anniversary. The game was released to manufacturing on November 19, 2021. Halo Infinite released on December 8, 2021.

=== Marketing ===
As the industry exposition E3 2020 was canceled due to the COVID-19 pandemic, Microsoft revealed the first gameplay footage of Halo Infinite via livestream. On June 24, 2020, the official Halo YouTube channel premiered a teaser titled "SIGNAL DETECTED. TAG DESIGNATION: FOE", which featured an audio clip of an anonymous character who represents the Banished, a faction introduced in Halo Wars 2.

Among the merchandising tie-ins for the game was Monster Energy Drink, a "Moa burger"-flavored version of Pringles, and Dr. Squatch "Spartan Soap". Participants can earn a variety of in-game weapon skins, player nameplates and weapon emblems. There are also several augmented reality experiences through Snapchat as part of the promotion.

Coinciding with Infinite's gameplay reveal was a trailer, "Step Inside", produced by 215 McCann, who had previously worked on the "Believe" campaign for Halo 3. The spot, showing Master Chief's armor being made, was the kickoff to a wider campaign, "Become", which focused on how the events of the games are shaped by ordinary people in the Halo universe.

At E3 2021, Microsoft unveiled two new trailers for the game, one showcasing the multiplayer campaign and the other a general story trailer.

On August 25, 2021, a CGI trailer for the first season of Infinite's multiplayer mode was released, focusing on the backstory of the new character Commander Agryna in an occupied London.

Microsoft created an Infinite-themed console and Elite Wireless Controller to tie in with the game's release. Other tie-in hardware included hard drives, keyboards, mice, and a limited number of Halo-themed Radeon RX 6900 graphics processing units.

== Reception ==
=== Pre-release ===
In contrast to the game's initial gameplay reveal, Halo Infinite's multiplayer beta release in August 2021 received praise, particularly for its gameplay improvements. The multiplayer's Battle Pass system, however, received criticism for its slow progression; in response, 343 adjusted the battle pass progression to speed up progress.

=== Critical reception ===
Reception

Aggregate scores
| Aggregator | Score |
|---|---|
| Metacritic | XSXS: 87/100; PC: 80/100 |
| OpenCritic | 94% recommend |

Review scores
| Publication | Score |
|---|---|
| Destructoid | 9/10 |
| Easy Allies | 8.0/10 |
| Game Informer | 9.25/10 |
| GameRevolution | 7.5/10 |
| GameSpot | 9/10 |
| GamesRadar+ | 4.5/5 |
| IGN | 9/10 |
| PC Gamer (US) | 78/100 |
| PCGamesN | 8/10 |
| PCMag | 4.5/5 |
| Video Games Chronicle | 4/5 |
| VG247 | 5/5 |

Halo Infinite received "generally favorable" reviews from critics, according to review aggregator website Metacritic. GamesRadar summarized it by saying "Halo as you've never seen it before" and Eurogamer called the release of Halo Infinite in the series "the best it's been in a decade".

TechRadar wrote Halo Infinite was "a triumph", saying "From its captivating story to its liberating gameplay, developer 343 Industries has created a campaign that will resonate with veteran Halo fans and inspire a new generation of players." IGN believed the Halo series to still belong amongst the best shooter games, especially praising Halo Infinite's single-player campaign and multiplayer, though considered the rewards gained in the latter's Battle Pass to be lackluster. The game's use of open world design and greater player freedom in certain areas received particular praise from others. Additionally, GameSpot editor Jordan Ramée praised the game's new grappleshot feature and rewarding single-player progression system.

PCMag complimented the soundtrack for providing "a mix of atmospheric exploration music, thrilling combat tracks, and songs and compositions that exist somewhere in between". PCGamesN praised the feel of each gun and engaging variety of the arsenal, saying "switching to the plasma rifle to knock the shield off a Jackal and then back to the VK78 Commando to get a snappy headshot never gets old". While praising the combat, PC Gamer were mixed on the level design of "lush forests, valleys and marine-rescue setup", finding it strongly evoked the mission Halo from Combat Evolved, but felt inferior to "the timeless design of The Silent Cartographer, or even Halo 3's less-fondly remembered meat labyrinth, Cortana". Rock Paper Shotgun liked the world design, but criticized the plot as being held back by prior entries; "Infinite's story is still ankle-clamped by the overindulgence of its predecessors, even though it does what it can to shrink things down into a tighter, more coherent spacetale". The game was selected by Game Informer as their Game of the Year. By January 2022, Halo Infinite had reached 20 million players.

=== Accolades ===
| Year | Award | Category | Result | Ref. |
|---|---|---|---|---|
| 2020 | The Game Awards 2020 | Most Anticipated Game | Nominated | |
| 2021 | Golden Joystick Awards | Most Wanted Game | Nominated | |
| 2021 | The Game Awards 2021 | Player's Voice | Won | |
| 2022 | Game Developers Choice Awards | Best Technology | Nominated | |
| 2022 | Game Developers Choice Awards | Best Design | Nominated | |
| 2022 | 25th Annual D.I.C.E. Awards | Action Game of the Year | Won | |
| 2022 | 25th Annual D.I.C.E. Awards | Online Game of the Year | Won | |
| 2022 | 25th Annual D.I.C.E. Awards | Outstanding Achievement in Audio Design | Nominated | |
| 2022 | 18th British Academy Games Awards | Audio Achievement | Nominated | |
| 2022 | 18th British Academy Games Awards | Multiplayer Game | Nominated | |
| 2022 | 18th British Academy Games Awards | Music | Nominated | |
| 2022 | 69th Golden Reel Awards | Outstanding Achievement in Sound Editing – Game Audio | Nominated | |
| 2022 | New York Game Awards 2022 | Big Apple Award for Game of the Year | Nominated | |
| 2022 | NAVGTR Awards | Outstanding Control Design, 3D | Nominated | |
| 2022 | NAVGTR Awards | Outstanding Control Precision | Nominated | |
| 2022 | NAVGTR Awards | Outstanding Game, Franchise Action | Won | |
| 2022 | NAVGTR Awards | Outstanding Graphics, Technical | Nominated | |
| 2022 | NAVGTR Awards | Outstanding Original Dramatic Score, Franchise | Won | |
| 2022 | NAVGTR Awards | Outstanding Sound Effects | Nominated | |
| 2022 | SXSW Gaming Awards | Excellence in Multiplayer | Nominated | |
| 2022 | Steam Awards | Better With Friends | Nominated | |
| 2022 | Video Game Accessibility Awards | Clear Text | Won | |
| 2022 | Video Game Accessibility Awards | Training Grounds | Won | |
| 2022 | Game Audio Network Guild Awards | Best Main Theme | Nominated | |
| 2022 | Game Audio Network Guild Awards | Best Original Soundtrack Album | Nominated | |
| 2022 | Game Audio Network Guild Awards | Best Physical Soundtrack Release | Won | |
| 2022 | Game Audio Network Guild Awards | Creative and Technical Achievement in Music | Nominated | |
| 2022 | Game Audio Network Guild Awards | Best UI Reward or Objective Sound Design | Nominated | |
| 2022 | Game Audio Network Guild Awards | Creative and Technical Achievement in Sound Design | Nominated | |
| 2022 | Game Audio Network Guild Awards | Best Ensemble Cast Performance | Nominated | |
| 2022 | Game Audio Network Guild Awards | Best Voice Performance (Darin De Paul as Escharum) | Nominated | |
| 2022 | Game Audio Network Guild Awards | Best Voice Performance (Jen Taylor as Cortana) | Nominated | |
| 2022 | Game Audio Network Guild Awards | Best Cinematic & Cutscene Audio | Nominated | |
| 2022 | Game Audio Network Guild Awards | Excellence in Audio Accessibility | Won | |
| 2022 | Golden Joystick Awards | Xbox Game of the Year | Nominated | |
