= Christopher Manson =

American writer and artist

Christopher Manson is a children's book author and illustrator noted for his use of traditional hand tools to painstakingly make the pine woodcuts that fill his several highly acclaimed works.

== Background ==
Born in Buffalo, New York, Manson graduated in 1975 from the Nova Scotia College of Art and Design in Halifax, Nova Scotia, having specialized in printmaking. He also obtained a Master of Fine Arts from the State University of New York at New Paltz (SUNY New Paltz).

He returned to Buffalo, where he took a job at a local arts council in arts management, a position that required fundraising skills. "It wasn't for me," he later recalled. "I figured out that I was tired of helping others make their art."

== Career ==
After illustrating a friend's cookbook, he published the puzzle book, MAZE: Solve the World's Most Challenging Puzzle (1985), issued by the publishing house Henry Holt and Company. The book promised a $10,000 award to whoever solved the book's many visual puzzles, and even after the contest has ended, the book remained in print, and was reissued as a computer game in CD-ROM format.

Manson summed up his approach to his authoring and illustrating children's books like so: "What I'm really after is the perfect book. The kind where you just can't imagine the words without the pictures, or the pictures without the words . . . like [Winnie-the-Pooh author A. A.] Milne. But there aren't that many out there to point to as perfect. I'm constantly working toward it." He added, "Even if I won the 40 million dollar lottery, I'd still do this — I'd have a fancier studio, but I'd still do this."

== Works ==
Author and illustrator:

- MAZE: Solve the World's Most Challenging Puzzle (1985)
- The Rails I Tote: Forty-Five Illustrated Spoonerisms to Decipher (1987)
- The Practical Alchemist: Showing The Way An Ordinary House-Cat May Be Transformed Into True Gold (1988)
- A Gift For The King: A Persian Tale (1989)
- Two Travelers (1990)
- The Crab Prince: An Entertainment For Children (1991)
- The Marvellous Blue Mouse (1992)

Illustrator:

- The Norman Table: The Traditional Cooking of Normandy (1985)
- A Farmyard Song (1992)
- The Tree in the Wood: An Old Nursery Song (1993)
- Good King Wenceslas (1994)
- Till Year's Good End (1997)
- Over the River and through the Wood (1998)
- Uncle Sam and Old Glory (2000)
- Black Swan/White Crow (2007)
- Blue Prince (2025)
