= 14th British Academy Games Awards =

Game award ceremony in 2018

- Date: 12 April 2018
- Location: Troxy, London
- Hosted by: Dara Ó Briain
- Best Game: What Remains of Edith Finch
- Most awards: Hellblade: Senua's Sacrifice (5)
- Most nominations: Hellblade: Senua's Sacrifice (9)

The 14th British Academy Video Game Awards hosted by the British Academy of Film and Television Arts on 12 April 2018 at Troxy honoured the best video games of 2017. It was hosted by Dara Ó Briain, who had previously hosted the 12th ceremony in 2016.

== Category changes ==
For the 13th ceremony, one new category was introduced. The Game Beyond Entertainment Award will be awarded to celebrate games that have a profound social impact. An official statement from BAFTA explains that the category will award

the best game that capitalises on the unique and maturing medium of games to deliver a transformational experience beyond pure entertainment - whether that is to raise awareness through empathy and emotional impact, to engage with real world problems, or to make the world a better place. While BAFTA has long been rewarding these games for their creative excellence, entries in this new category will be judged solely on content: its emotional impact, thematic fit and innovative use of the medium to explore and deliver impactful messages.

== Nominations ==
On 21 February 2018, it was announced that Tim Schafer, founder of Double Fine Productions, would be awarded the Fellowship award, the highest honour BAFTA can bestow. The nominations for other awards were announced on 15 March 2018.

=== Awards ===
The awards were presented on 12 April 2018.

Best Game: What Remains of Edith Finch – Giant Sparrow / Annapurna Interactive; Assassin's Creed Origins – Ubisoft Montreal / Ubisoft; Hellblade: Senua's Sacrifice – Ninja Theory Ltd; Horizon Zero Dawn – Guerrilla Games / Sony Interactive Entertainment Europe; Super Mario Odyssey – Nintendo EPD / Nintendo; The Legend of Zelda: Breath of the Wild – Nintendo EPD / Nintendo	Artistic Achievement: Hellblade: Senua's Sacrifice – Ninja Theory Ltd; Cuphead – StudioMDHR Entertainment Inc.; Gorogoa – Jason Roberts, Buried Signal / Annapurna Interactive; Horizon Zero Dawn – Guerrilla Games / Sony Interactive Entertainment Europe; The Legend of Zelda: Breath of the Wild – Nintendo EPD / Nintendo; Uncharted: The Lost Legacy – Naughty Dog / Sony Interactive Entertainment Europe
Audio Achievement: Hellblade: Senua's Sacrifice – Ninja Theory Ltd; Call of Duty: WWII – Sledgehammer Games / Activision; Destiny 2 – Bungie / Activision; Horizon Zero Dawn – Guerrilla Games / Sony Interactive Entertainment Europe; Star Wars: Battlefront II - EA DICE / Electronic Arts; Uncharted: The Lost Legacy – Naughty Dog / Sony Interactive Entertainment Europe	British Game: Hellblade: Senua's Sacrifice – Ninja Theory Ltd; Monument Valley 2 – ustwo games; Reigns: Her Majesty – Nerial Ltd / Devolver Digital; The Sexy Brutale – Cavalier Game Studios / Tequila Works; Sniper Elite 4 – Rebellion; Total War: Warhammer II – Creative Assembly / SEGA
Debut Game: Gorogoa – Jason Roberts, Buried Signal / Annapurna Interactive; Cuphead – StudioMDHR Entertainment Inc.; Hollow Knight – Team Cherry; Night in the Woods – InfiniteFall / Finji; The Sexy Brutale – Cavalier Game Studios / Tequila Works; Slime Rancher – Monomi Park	Evolving Game: Overwatch – Blizzard Entertainment; Clash Royale – Supercell; Final Fantasy XV – Square Enix; Fortnite – Epic Games; PlayerUnknown's Battlegrounds – PUBG Corp / Bluehole, Inc.; Tom Clancy's Rainbow Six Siege – Ubisoft Montreal / Ubisoft
Family: Super Mario Odyssey – Nintendo EPD / Nintendo; Just Dance 2018 – Ubisoft Paris / Ubisoft; Lego Worlds – TT Games / Warner Bros. Interactive Entertainment; Mario + Rabbids: Kingdom Battle – Ubisoft; Monument Valley 2 – ustwo games; Snipperclips – SFB Games / Nintendo	Game Beyond Entertainment: Hellblade: Senua's Sacrifice – Ninja Theory Ltd; Bury Me, My Love – The Pixel Hunt & Fig / ARTE & Playdius; Last Day of June – Ovosonico / 505 Games; Life Is Strange: Before the Storm – Deck Nine / Square Enix; Night in the Woods – InfiniteFall / Finji; Sea Hero Quest VR – Glitchers
Game Design: Super Mario Odyssey – Nintendo EPD / Nintendo; Assassin's Creed Origins – Ubisoft Montreal / Ubisoft; Horizon Zero Dawn – Guerrilla Games / Sony Interactive Entertainment Europe; The Legend of Zelda: Breath of the Wild – Nintendo EPD / Nintendo; NieR: Automata – PlatinumGames / Square Enix; What Remains of Edith Finch – Giant Sparrow / Annapurna Interactive	Game Innovation: The Legend of Zelda: Breath of the Wild – Nintendo EPD / Nintendo; Gorogoa – Jason Roberts, Buried Signal / Annapurna Interactive; Hellblade: Senua's Sacrifice – Ninja Theory Ltd; NieR: Automata – PlatinumGames / Square Enix; Snipperclips – SFB Games / Nintendo; What Remains of Edith Finch – Giant Sparrow / Annapurna Interactive
Mobile Game: Golf Clash – Playdemic; Bury Me, My Love – The Pixel Hunt & Fig / ARTE & Playdius; Gorogoa – Jason Roberts, Buried Signal / Annapurna Interactive; Kami 2 – State of Play; Monument Valley 2 – ustwo games; Stranger Things: The Game – BonusXP, Inc.	Multiplayer: Divinity: Original Sin II – Larian Studios / Larian Studios Games; Fortnite – Epic Games; Gang Beasts – Boneloaf / Double Fine Productions; PlayerUnknown's Battlegrounds – PUBG Corp / Bluehole, Inc.; Splatoon 2 – Nintendo EPD / Nintendo; Star Trek: Bridge Crew – Red Storm Entertainment / Ubisoft
Music: Cuphead – StudioMDHR Entertainment Inc.; Get Even – The Farm 51 / Bandai Namco Entertainment Europe; Hellblade: Senua's Sacrifice – Ninja Theory Ltd; Horizon Zero Dawn – Guerrilla Games / Sony Interactive Entertainment Europe; The Legend of Zelda: Breath of the Wild – Nintendo EPD / Nintendo; What Remains of Edith Finch – Giant Sparrow / Annapurna Interactive	Narrative: Night in the Woods – InfiniteFall / Finji; Hellblade: Senua's Sacrifice – Ninja Theory Ltd; Horizon Zero Dawn – Guerrilla Games / Sony Interactive Entertainment Europe; Tacoma – Fullbright; What Remains of Edith Finch – Giant Sparrow / Annapurna Interactive; Wolfenstein II: The New Colossus - Machine Games / Bethesda
Original Property: Horizon Zero Dawn – Guerrilla Games / Sony Interactive Entertainment Europe; Cuphead – StudioMDHR Entertainment Inc.; Gorogoa – Jason Roberts, Buried Signal / Annapurna Interactive; Night in the Woods – InfiniteFall / Finji; PlayerUnknown's Battlegrounds – PUBG Corp / Bluehole, Inc.; What Remains of Edith Finch – Giant Sparrow / Annapurna Interactive	Performer: Melina Juergens – Hellblade: Senua's Sacrifice as Senua; Abubakar Salim – Assassin's Creed Origins as Bayek; Ashly Burch – Horizon Zero Dawn as Aloy; Claudia Black – Uncharted: The Lost Legacy as Chloe Frazer; Laura Bailey – Uncharted: The Lost Legacy as Nadine Ross; Valerie Rose Lohman – What Remains of Edith Finch as Edith Finch

=== BAFTA Fellowship ===
Tim Schafer

=== Games with multiple nominations and wins ===
==== Nominations ====
Nominations	Game
9	Hellblade: Senua's Sacrifice
8	Horizon Zero Dawn
7	What Remains of Edith Finch
5	Gorogoa
5	The Legend of Zelda: Breath of the Wild
4	Cuphead
4	Night in the Woods
4	Uncharted: The Lost Legacy
3	Assassin's Creed Origins
3	Monument Valley 2
3	PlayerUnknown's Battlegrounds
3	Super Mario Odyssey
2	Bury Me, My Love
2	Fortnite
2	NieR: Automata
2	The Sexy Brutale
2	Snipperclips

==== Wins ====
Wins	Game
5	Hellblade: Senua's Sacrifice
2	Super Mario Odyssey
