= What Remains of Edith Finch =

2017 exploration game

- Developer: Giant Sparrow
- Publisher: Annapurna Interactive
- Director: Ian Dallas
- Producers: Alvin Nelson; Michael Fallik
- Designer: Chris Bell
- Programmer: Joshua Sarfaty
- Artist: Brandon Martynowicz
- Writer: Ian Dallas
- Composer: Jeff Russo
- Engine: Unreal Engine 4
- Platforms: PlayStation 4; Windows; Xbox One; Nintendo Switch; iOS; PlayStation 5; Xbox Series X/S
- Release: PlayStation 4, Windows; April 25, 2017; Xbox One; July 19, 2017; Nintendo Switch; July 4, 2019; iOS; August 16, 2021; PS5, Xbox Series X/S; July 28, 2022
- Genre: Walking simulator
- Mode: Single-player

What Remains of Edith Finch is a first-person walking simulator developed by Giant Sparrow and published by Annapurna Interactive. The game was released in 2017 for PlayStation 4, Windows, and Xbox One; for Nintendo Switch in 2019; for iOS in 2021; and for PlayStation 5 and Xbox Series X/S in 2022

The story follows the seventeen-year-old Edith Finch, the last surviving member of her family, as she returns to her ancestral home for the first time in seven years. Reexploring the house, she uncovers her family's mysterious past and learns about the series of deaths that eventually caused the complete collapse of her family structure. The game is presented as an interconnected anthology. The story utilizes unique media from multiple perspectives and is told through a series of vignettes; however, the player is made to doubt the authenticity of each story being told. The magical realist story touches on themes of free will, fate, memory, and death.

What Remains of Edith Finch received critical acclaim, receiving praise for its immersive storytelling, characters, and presentation; and is considered an example of video games as an art form. Among other awards and nominations, it won the British Academy Games Award for Best Game 2017 and the Best Narrative category at both The Game Awards 2017 and the 2018 Game Developers Choice Awards.

== Gameplay ==
In one gameplay sequence, the player must balance manipulating Lewis Finch's imaginary fantasy on the left side of the screen whilst decapitating fish on the right with separate sets of controls.

What Remains of Edith Finch is a narrative-focused adventure game. As Edith, the player explores the Finch house and surrounding wilderness through a semi-linear series of rooms, footpaths, crawlspaces, and secret passages. Edith's narration guides the player, providing commentary on her own thoughts, experiences, and relations to each character; and therefore provides exposition and nuance relating to many of the semi-self-contained sequences in the game. Various narrative-related objects such as books, clutter, and decorations provide Edith this opportunity; which is framed as the vocalization of Edith's own writings in her journal revealed chronologically as she makes her way through the house. Throughout which, the player encounters the former bedrooms of deceased family members which have been memorialized and preserved since the time of the respective individual's death. Having the option to skip multiple sequences, the player interacts with objects placed at these memorials to progress through the story, each of which inspire a unique vignette revealing the circumstances of each person's death. These vignettes vary wildly in medium, perspective, genre, stylization, and gameplay mechanics, as well as intent and veracity of their source; therefore providing a series of unique and semi-self-contained stories throughout the game, oftentimes evoking themes of magical realism, the total accuracy of which the player is made to doubt.

== Plot ==
The player character takes a ferry to Orcas Island, Washington carrying the journal of Edith Finch. The journal details Edith's experience returning to her ancestral home on the island for the first time in seven years. As a 17-year-old, Edith writes that she is the last surviving member of her family. The player then takes the perspective of Edith as she reexplores the house and discovers the alleged circumstances of each relative's death, the authenticity of which is confused due to the unique mediums and perspectives of each source.

Edith explains that her family is believed to be cursed because of the untimely deaths they frequently experience. In 1937, in an effort to escape the curse after the death of his wife Ingeborg and newborn son Johann, Edith's great-great-grandfather Odin Finch emigrates from Norway to the United States. Alongside his daughter Edith (Edith Sr., or 'Edie'), her husband Sven (né Hoffstad), and their newborn daughter Molly, he ferries his family house with them. However, waves off the shore of Orcas Island capsize the house and Odin drowns. The remaining family builds a new home and accompanying graveyard nearby. Here, Edie gives birth to Barbara, twins Calvin and Sam, and Walter.

For a while, Edie believes they have left the curse behind, but unusual tragedies begin to befall her family. At 10 years old, Molly dies after ingesting fluoridated toothpaste and holly berries due to her mother's neglect; at 16, Barbara is murdered after a heated argument with her boyfriend Rick; at 11, Calvin falls to his death after swinging off the edge of a cliff; at 49, Edie's husband Sven dies during a construction accident at the house; and, at 53, after spending 30 years living in a bunker beneath the house, Walter finally decides to leave and is immediately hit by a train upon exiting. Edie memorializes each death by turning their respective bedrooms into shrines.

Sam marries a woman named Kay Carlyle, and they have three children: Dawn, Gus, and Gregory. However, Dawn is the only one to live to adulthood. At 22 months, Gregory drowns in the bathtub after being left unattended by his mother; and, at 13, Gus is crushed while flying a kite during a storm. Sam and Kay get a divorce and, at 33, whilst on a hunting trip with Dawn, Sam falls to his death after being bucked from a cliff by a deer.

Traumatized, Dawn moves to Kolkata, India, marries Sanjay Kumar, and they have three children: Lewis, Milton, and Edith (Jr.). In 2002, Sanjay dies in an earthquake and Dawn returns with her children to the Finch home. At 11 years old, Milton inexplicably disappears, (Note: Ian Dallas of Giant Sparrow confirmed that Milton escaped into his artwork and became the king character of The Unfinished Swan, the team's previous game.) and Dawn becomes paranoid. She seals off the memorialized bedrooms of the deceased and forbids her children from learning about their family history in an effort to save them from a similar fate.

In 2010, after struggling with substance abuse and mental illness, Lewis commits suicide at the age of 21, cutting his head off with the fish-cutting machine he used at work. Now desperate, Dawn decides they must all leave the house. Edie, however, refuses to go, and, after a heated argument, Dawn and Edith flee the house without her, leaving most of their possessions behind. The next day, Edie is found dead at the age of 93 after consuming alcohol alongside her prescription medication.

Seven years later, Dawn succumbs to an undisclosed illness and 17-year-old Edith inherits the property. Returning to the house, Edith discovers for herself the stories of her family's unique history, documenting her own thoughts and experiences in her journal. Edith reveals that she is pregnant (though the player can figure this out already if they look straight down) and that the journal is intended for her unborn child in case she should die before she is able to tell them the stories herself.

In the final scene, the initial player character seen on the ferry at the start of the game is revealed to be Edith's son, Christopher, Edith having died during the labor in 2017. In an unspecified time in the future, Christopher places flowers on his mother's grave.

== Development ==
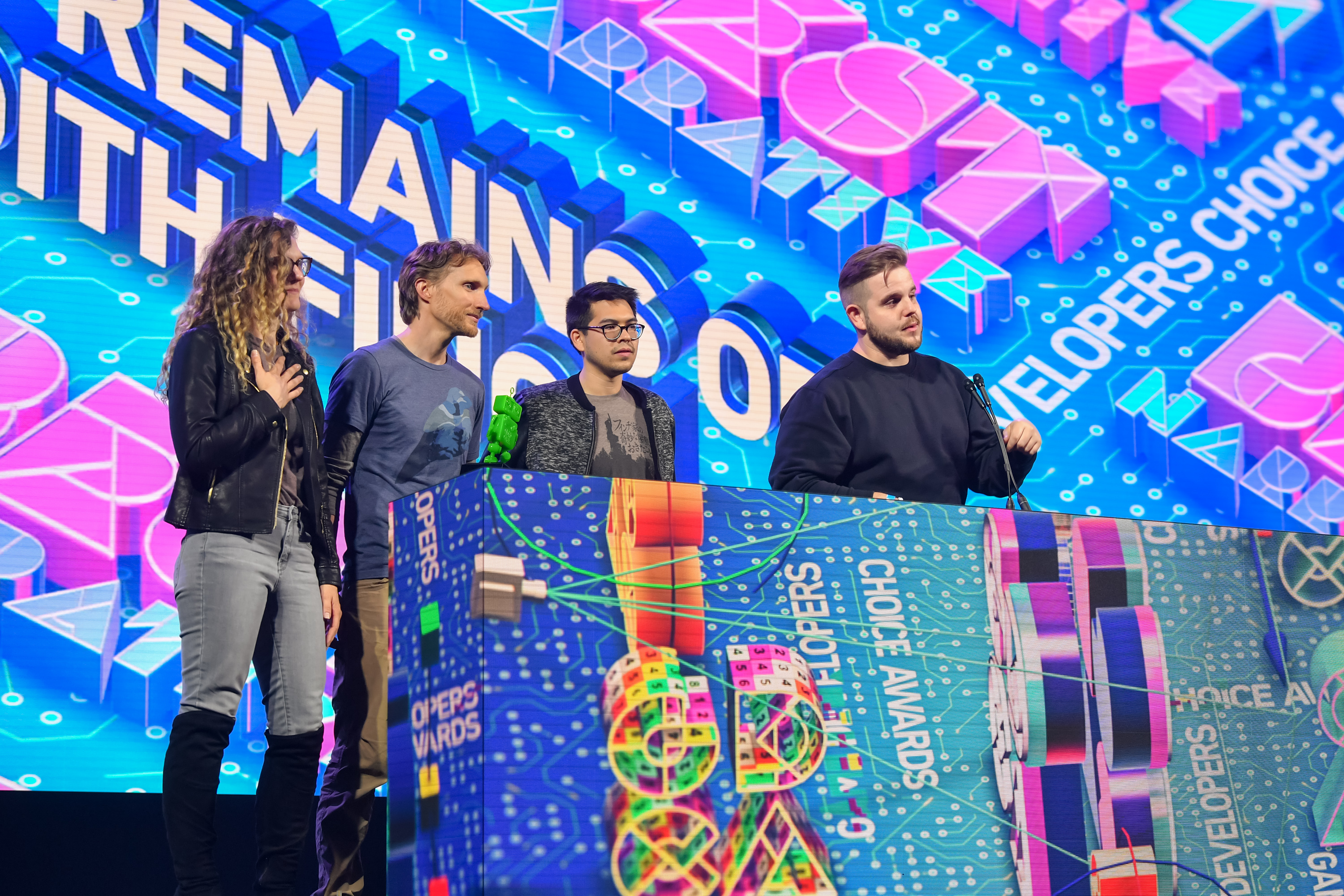
The Giant Sparrow team, at the 2018 Game Developers Choice Awards. From left: Chelsea Hash, Ian Dallas, Michael Kwan, Chris Bell

What Remains of Edith Finch is the second game developed by the team at Giant Sparrow, led by creative director Ian Dallas. Their debut effort was the BAFTA-award-winning The Unfinished Swan. The concept of What Remains of Edith Finch grew out from trying to create something sublime, as described by Dallas, "an interactive experience that evokes what it feels like to have a moment of finding something beautiful, yet overwhelming". Dallas embodied this concept by using his own experience as a scuba diver while he had lived in Washington State, and seeing the ocean fall off into darkness into the distance. The game initially was based on this scuba diving approach, but this created a number of problems with conveying narrative. While the game was in this state, they came up with the idea of using floating text captions of the narrative to be seen by the player, which remained as a key gameplay element through the game's ongoing changes. The team struggled on the diver idea until Dallas came up with the idea of a shark falling into a forest with a child uttering the line "and suddenly I was a shark", which sparked the idea of moving into more strange and unnatural scenarios; this specific one would eventually become the mini-experience for Molly, who died after eating poisonous holly berries and whose bedroom is the first the player explores in the game. While the Molly scenario was fleshed out further, the team broke out to develop other scenarios that captured the same sense, giving the player something interesting to watch or do but knowing that their characters were about to die, creating the type of experience they wanted to evoke.

The Finches' home, with new additions built atop it in a seemingly haphazard manner. The game guides the player by presenting the voice-over narration as text within the game's setting.

To link these mini-experiences, they had to come up with a framing device. Initially, they considered a scenario similar to The Canterbury Tales but set in a modern-day high school, but soon recognized that placing these deaths in context of a cursed family would work better, forming an anthology work like The Twilight Zone, while borrowing concepts from the novel One Hundred Years of Solitude, which similarly involved the overlapping stories of various family members. With this approach set, the team then only had to determine the genealogical nature of this family and how the house should be styled. For the house itself, Dallas stated they had three words they worked from: sublime, intimate and murky. Their goal was to make the house itself feel like "a natural force. It begins to look almost like the bark of a tree; something that has an order to it, but it's too chaotic for us to be able to follow." While they had designed all the bedrooms in roughly the same order the player experienced them in the game, it was not until the second-to-last bedroom, that of Lewis who had been into marijuana use, that they realized that these bedrooms can be used to say much more about each family member by how they were decorated. Lewis' had been heavily decorated with posters and other items that indicated his drug abuse, and the team realized this shared a lot about his character they did not have to communicate via narration or the death sequence. Major changes were made to all the previous bedrooms to provide similar expository elements for each character over the last few months before release.

External videos
- Greenlight trailer for What Remains of Edith Finch

The team also recognized that from some of these mini-experiences they created, they wanted to leave them open-ended as to exactly what happened, following the convention of weird fiction to leave the player questioning if the mini-experiences they had played through were grounded in reality or not. They did not want to make a horror game, where their purpose would be to intentionally scare the player, but wanted to borrow concepts common in the horror genre, such as Lovecraftian elements. The game had started out titled The Nightmares of Edith Finch, and its greenlight trailer has a spookier nature to it, such as the protagonist exploring the house mostly in the dark with a flashlight, but the team eventually backed off on these elements to leave the more eerie elements, renaming the game to its final title. The game's ending was considered the most difficult part for the team, according to Dallas, as they did not know if they should end the game on a mini-experience that elevated the sense of unease from previous ones. Eventually, they opted to go with something completely different, a closure on the story that was intended to give time for the player to reflect on what they had just played through. Dallas credits suggestions made by Dino Patti of Playdead and Jenova Chen of thatgamecompany, following a playtest of the game, of inspiring the pregnancy and childbirth facets to close out the story after all the death that they had experienced. In an unusual move, the player is able to look down from the first-person view in-game at Edith's body and see her belly, hinting about her pregnancy. Though Dallas had not wanted to have the player see parts of the character's body, their tech artist Chelsea Hash insisted on keeping this in, which Dallas found later to be a pleasant surprise for players that discovered this on their own.

The game had been in development since at least 2013, when Giant Sparrow partnered with Sony Computer Entertainment. It was first announced in an on-stage trailer at the 2014 PlayStation Experience, as a title to be published by Santa Monica Studio, with a subsequent trailer released prior to E3 2015. In the interim, Sony started to wane on its support for independently developed video games, and Santa Monica Studios dropped the title from its lineup. However, several people that had been at Santa Monica Studios working with Giant Sparrow left the studio to form Annapurna Interactive, which then became the game's new publisher. Annapurna relaxed some of the deadlines that Sony had originally had for the title, allowing Giant Sparrow to keep and refine some of the more significant mini-experiences they created and would have otherwise had to cut under a tighter schedule. These included the infant Gregory, who drowns while in the bath while his mother is distracted. The drowning sequence set to "The Waltz of the Flowers" from The Nutcracker by Pyotr Ilyich Tchaikovsky, and Lewis', a mini-adventure game taking place in Lewis' mind while at the same time decapitating fish at a cannery that was inspired by "The Coronation of Mr. Thomas Shap" from The Book of Wonder. Gregory's story was particularly one of concern since it involved the death of an infant, which raised concerns with their publisher. To help alleviate these, Giant Sparrow specifically brought in parents to help playtest as to make sure the story handled the topic in a sensitive manner.

One of the most-changed stories was Walter's, Edie's son that withdrew after the death of his older sister Barbara and locked himself away in a basement bunker, only decades later deciding to leave via a tunnel and getting hit by a passing train. Originally, once in the bunker, Walter would have experienced still people that moved when he looked away, similar to Doctor Who's Weeping Angels or The Prisoner, and then would imagine himself living on a model trainset where an invisible hand would move pieces around on the set. Both aspects were to represent the passage of time for the decades Walter lived there, and out of paranoia, Walter would then escape through the tunnel and to his demise. This was ultimately trimmed down to showing Walter going through the same routine each day, eating peaches from a can, until one day he decides to escape. Another scrapped idea for the game was to bring in "Weird Al" Yankovic to compose a song about Edie. Inspired by the story of Harry R. Truman, a man who had refused to leave his home prior to the eruption of Mount St. Helens, the team had envisioned a scenario that Edie would have also refused to leave her family home despite the threat of a nearby forest fire sometime in the 1980s. With this concept, her story made national news and made her a national icon that, in the timeline, Yankovic would have made a song about her that would have been included as part of Edie's story. However, this idea came too late in the development without enough time to follow up on it.

Composer Jeff Russo, whose previous works include the soundtracks to the Fargo TV series, The Night Of, and Power, composed the soundtrack for What Remains of Edith Finch. The sequence involving Barbara, who gained fame as an adolescent scream queen and who longs to return to Hollywood but dies on her birthday on Halloween night, is played out in the pages of a comic book styled after Tales from the Crypt. Following several horror genre tropes, her boyfriend intends to inspire real fear to induce her to regain her famous scream, but they then seem to be stalked by a serial killer whom she disables, only to be scared to death by either friends throwing her a surprise birthday party or supernatural monsters or a band of hoodlums in costume. Dallas had Russo try to create a soundtrack similar to the theme from John Carpenter's Halloween. Dallas had considered asking Carpenter to narrate this section, but at the time, the video game voice actor strike was ongoing, making this impossible, but Carpenter did agree to license the use of the Halloween theme for this sequence.

== Reception ==
Reception

Aggregate score
Aggregator	Score
Metacritic	PC: 89/100; PS4: 88/100; XONE: 92/100; NS: 88/100

Review scores
Publication	Score
Destructoid	9/10
Electronic Gaming Monthly	7/10
Game Informer	8.75/10
GameRevolution	3.5/5
GameSpot	9/10
IGN	8.8/10
PC Gamer (US)	91/100
Polygon	9/10
TouchArcade	4.5/5
VideoGamer.com	9/10

What Remains of Edith Finch received "generally favorable" reviews for the Windows, PlayStation 4, and Nintendo Switch versions, while the Xbox One version received "universal acclaim", according to review aggregator website Metacritic.

Destructoid's Brett Makedonski scored the game a 9/10 with the consensus "A hallmark of excellence. There may be flaws, but they are negligible and won't cause massive damage."

Marty Sliva's 8.8/10 score on IGN stated that "What Remains of Edith Finch is a gorgeous experience and one of the finest magical-realism stories in all of games."

Andy Chalk's gave a score of 91 out of 100 on PC Gamer and said it was "Touching, sad, and brilliant; a story worth forgiving the limited interactivity to experience."

Josh Harmon of EGMNow awarded it 7/10, stating that Edith Finch is "a brilliant accomplishment. It's also a game that repeatedly fails to live up to its potential in serious, heartbreaking ways. Until now, I'd never realized it was possible to be both at the same time."

Griffin Vacheron from GameRevolution gave the game a score of 3.5 stars out of 5, saying that "If you're more like me, though, and deviate from the assessment of tragic events as an inherently higher form, then you may find the Finch's tale doesn't activate your almonds as much as it probably should. Still, as a spooky, logical evolution of the Gone Homes and Firewatches of the world, with an impressive short-story style to boot, What Remains of Edith Finch is ultimately worth your time if its premise grabs you."

"In What Remains of Edith Finch, death is a certainty and life is the surprise. Its stories are enchanting, despite their unhappy ends. I was sad I never had the chance to know the Finches while they were alive, but thankful for the opportunity, however brief, to learn a bit about them. The final farewell left me crying, but What Remains of Edith Finch is, without doubt, love," was Susan Arendt's conclusion on Polygon with a score of 9/10.

Colm Ahern's score of 9/10 on VideoGamer.com said that "First-person, narrative-driven games generally follow a pattern. What Remains of Edith Finch plays with those established conventions to create a beautiful story that breaks your heart, while making you smile just as much. A triumph in the genre."

Eurogamer ranked the game second on their list of the "Top 50 Games of 2017", while GamesRadar+ ranked it fifth on their list of the 25 Best Games of 2017. In Game Informer's Reader's Choice Best of 2017 Awards, the game came at fourth place for "Best Adventure Game" with just 10% of the votes, about 4% behind Life Is Strange: Before the Storm. The same website also gave it the award of "Best Adventure Game" in their Best of 2017 Awards, and of "Best Narrative" and "Adventure Game of the Year" in their 2017 Adventure Game of the Year Awards. EGMNow ranked the game at #25 in their list of the 25 Best Games of 2017, while Polygon ranked it 13th on their list of the 50 best games of 2017.

The game won the award for "Best Story" in PC Gamer's 2017 Game of the Year Awards, and was nominated for "Game of the Year". It was also nominated for "Best Xbox One Game" in Destructoid's Game of the Year Awards 2017; for "Best Adventure Game" and "Best Story" in IGN's Best of 2017 Awards; and for "Best Moment or Sequence" (Cannery Sequence) in Giant Bomb's 2017 Game of the Year Awards.

=== Accolades ===
Year	Award	Category	Result	Ref.
2017	35th Annual Golden Joystick Awards	Best Storytelling	Nominated	
2017	35th Annual Golden Joystick Awards	Best Indie Game	Nominated	
2017	35th Annual Golden Joystick Awards	Breakthrough Award (Giant Sparrow)	Nominated	
2017	The Game Awards 2017	Best Narrative	Won	
2017	The Game Awards 2017	Games for Impact	Nominated	
2017	The Game Awards 2017	Best Independent Game	Nominated	
2017	Titanium Awards	Game of the Year	Nominated	
2017	Titanium Awards	Best Indie Game	Nominated	
2018	New York Game Awards 2018	Big Apple Award for Best Game of the Year	Nominated	
2018	New York Game Awards 2018	Off-Broadway Award for Best Indie Game	Nominated	
2018	New York Game Awards 2018	Herman Melville Award for Best Writing	Nominated	
2018	New York Game Awards 2018	Statue of Liberty Award for Best World	Nominated	
2018	New York Game Awards 2018	Great White Way Award for Best Acting in a Game (Valerie Rose Lohman)	Nominated	
2018	21st Annual D.I.C.E. Awards	Outstanding Achievement in Game Direction	Nominated	
2018	21st Annual D.I.C.E. Awards	Outstanding Achievement in Story	Nominated	
2018	National Academy of Video Game Trade Reviewers Awards	Camera Direction in a Game Engine	Nominated	
2018	National Academy of Video Game Trade Reviewers Awards	Game Design, New IP	Nominated	
2018	National Academy of Video Game Trade Reviewers Awards	Game, Original Adventure	Won	
2018	National Academy of Video Game Trade Reviewers Awards	Lighting/Texturing	Won	
2018	National Academy of Video Game Trade Reviewers Awards	Original Light Mix Score, New IP	Nominated	
2018	Italian Video Game Awards	Game of the Year	Nominated	
2018	Italian Video Game Awards	Best Narrative	Nominated	
2018	Italian Video Game Awards	Best Indie Game	Won	
2018	Italian Video Game Awards	Game Beyond Entertainment	Nominated	
2018	SXSW Gaming Awards	Excellence in Narrative	Won	
2018	SXSW Gaming Awards	Matthew Crump Cultural Innovation Award	Nominated	
2018	Game Developers Choice Awards	Innovation Award	Nominated	
2018	Game Developers Choice Awards	Best Narrative	Won	
2018	14th British Academy Games Awards	Best Game	Won	
2018	14th British Academy Games Awards	Game Design	Nominated	
2018	14th British Academy Games Awards	Game Innovation	Nominated	
2018	14th British Academy Games Awards	Music	Nominated	
2018	14th British Academy Games Awards	Narrative	Nominated	
2018	14th British Academy Games Awards	Original Property	Nominated	
2018	14th British Academy Games Awards	Performer (Valerie Rose Lohman)	Nominated	
2018	2018 Webby Awards	Best Art Direction	Nominated	
2018	2018 Webby Awards	Best Game Design	Nominated	
2018	2018 Games for Change Awards	Best Gameplay	Won	
