= Giant Sparrow =

Video game company

- Company type: Private
- Industry: Video games
- Founded: March 22, 2009
- Headquarters: Santa Monica, California, U.S.
- Key people: Ian Dallas, creative director
- Products: The Unfinished Swan; What Remains of Edith Finch
- Website: giantsparrow.com

Giant Sparrow is an American independent video game developer based in Santa Monica, California. It is best known for developing adventure games with emphasis on narrative elements, including The Unfinished Swan (2012) and What Remains of Edith Finch (2017).

== History ==
Giant Sparrow was founded by developer Ian Dallas in 2009. Prior to founding, Dallas originally had graduated from Yale University with a degree in film, moved to Los Angeles, and worked in writing for television, having written for Rock Me Baby, Spaceballs: The Animated Series, Drawn Together, and Help Me Help You. He found that writers had little direction on how a project could take shape in the television industry. He turned his sights towards video games, enrolling at the University of Southern California for a post-graduate program in game design. During his studies, he developed some small game prototypes, one which drew attention of Sony Interactive Entertainment and led to his securing a deal with Sony to develop the prototype into a full title. He dropped out of school and formed Giant Sparrow, with a small office set up within the space of Sony's Santa Monica Studio in Los Angeles. With its formation, Sony gave Giant Sparrow a three-game development deal, giving Sony right of first refusal for publishing. Giant Sparrow became the second independent studio, following Thatgamecompany, to be treated as a first-party developer within Sony.

As of 2024, the studio remains with only three developers including Dallas, but receives support from Santa Monica Studios for its development.

== Games ==
The Unfinished Swan is the company's debut game, based on Dallas' post-graduate prototype. It is set in a surreal, blank world, in which the player, a boy named Monroe, chases a swan that has escaped a painting. The player must throw paint at their white surroundings to reveal the world. The game was released for the PlayStation 3 on October 23, 2012 and for PlayStation 4 and PlayStation Vita by Sony Computer Entertainment in 2014, while ports for Windows and iOS were released by Annapurna Interactive in 2020. The Unfinished Swan received the BAFTA "Best Game" and "Best Debut Game" awards in 2013.

What Remains of Edith Finch is a first-person narrative adventure game, presented as a series of vignettes around the seemingly cursed fate of the Finch family. Originally a diving simulator, it grew to incorporate an anthology style inspired by The Twilight Zone and One Hundred Years of Solitude. It was released for Microsoft Windows and PlayStation 4 on April 25, 2017. On December 7, 2017, it was awarded the "Best Narrative" for The Game Awards and received the BAFTA "Best Game" award in April 2018.

A new game is in development, which Dallas described as a series of short stories focused on a field biologist and "the strangeness of organic life". The game bore out from ideas based on nature documentaries from David Attenborough and the mythological world of Spirited Away.

| Year | Title | Publisher | Platforms |
|---|---|---|---|
| 2012 | The Unfinished Swan | Sony Computer Entertainment (PS3, PS4, Vita); Annapurna Interactive (Windows, iOS) | PS3, PS4, Vita, Windows, iOS |
| 2017 | What Remains of Edith Finch | Annapurna Interactive | PS4, PS5, Windows, Xbox One, Xbox Series X/S, Switch, iOS |

== See also ==
- Legendary Gary
