= The Unfinished Swan =

2012 video game

- Developers: Giant Sparrow (Note: Additional work by Santa Monica Studio); Armature Studio (PS4, Vita)
- Publishers: Sony Computer Entertainment (PS3, PS4, Vita); Annapurna Interactive (Windows, iOS)
- Directors: Ian Dallas; Joshua M. Sarfaty; Hokyo Lim
- Producer: Max Geiger
- Designers: Benjamin Esposito; Mike Niederquell
- Programmers: Joshua Sarfaty; Joshua Beeler; Chris Oates; Gavin Dodd; Eric Itomura; David Seims; Nathan Frost
- Artists: Hokyo Lim; Gary Brunetti; Cory Davis; Miriam Nagi; Flavien Courbier
- Writers: Ian Dallas; Hans Rodionoff
- Composer: Joel Corelitz
- Engine: Gamebryo
- Platforms: PlayStation 3; PlayStation 4; Vita; Windows; iOS
- Release: PS3: NA: October 23, 2012; PAL: October 24, 2012; JP: December 13, 2012; PS4, Vita: JP: October 23, 2014; NA: October 28, 2014; PAL: October 29, 2014; Windows, iOS: WW: September 10, 2020
- Genre: Adventure
- Mode: Single-player

The Unfinished Swan is an adventure video game developed by Giant Sparrow and published by Sony Computer Entertainment for the PlayStation 3 in October 2012. The game starts with a completely white space in which the player, a boy named Monroe (voiced by Nicholas Marj), is chasing after a swan that has escaped a painting, while simultaneously learning the story of a lonely king (voiced by Terry Gilliam). The PlayStation 4 and PlayStation Vita versions of the game, which was developed by Armature Studio, was released in October 2014. The game was released on Microsoft Windows and iOS by Annapurna Interactive in September 2020.

== Plot ==
Monroe is a young boy whose mother has recently died. She was a painter who is known to have never finished a painting, having created over 300 incomplete works. Monroe is told by his orphanage that he is only allowed to keep one of her paintings, so he chooses her favorite, a painting of a swan missing its neck.

One night, Monroe wakes up to find the swan has escaped its painting, and he chases it until he finds himself in a mysterious painted world. With the help of his mother's magical silver paintbrush, Monroe begins to explore the painted world as he chases the swan. He soon discovers the remains of a vast but deserted kingdom, where he learns that the kingdom was once ruled by the King, who used his powers to build the kingdom. However, due to a combination of his negligence and incompetence, all of the King's subjects became fed up with his rule and left the kingdom.

Monroe continues to pursue the swan to a distant island off of the coast. There, he learns that the King, wanting to leave behind some sort of legacy, decided to make a family, so he painted a woman to be his companion. The two quickly fell in love, and the woman became pregnant. However, she left without a trace, implying that the woman is in fact Monroe's mother, making him the King's son. Monroe continues to travel deeper into the island where he finds a massive, but incomplete, statue of the King. He further learns that the King, depressed at the departure of his wife, decided to build the statue to serve as his lasting legacy, but his powers began to fade until he fell into an eternal sleep. Monroe climbs his way to the top of the statue where he finds the King, who finally wakes up.

The King (voiced by Terry Gilliam) recounts to Monroe of a strange dream he had, and how he has come to accept that his works and the painted world will not last forever and will eventually fade away. The King then passes his silver paintbrush on to Monroe and confirms Monroe is his son before sending him back to the real world. That night, Monroe decides to finish his mother's painting, giving the swan its missing neck and adding a pair of baby swans.

== Development ==
Development of The Unfinished Swan began in February 2008, using the Microsoft XNA toolkit which took about 2 months to complete. Later in the year the prototype was expanded and submitted to the Independent Games Festival where it was part of the student finalists, but ultimately losing against Tag: The Power of Paint in its category.

The 2008 tech demo presented a "cold and desolate" atmosphere, using songs released by Moby under a non-commercial license. However, within the same year, the development team had settled on the concept of an "interactive children's book."

After its showing at the IGF, Sony and Giant Sparrow signed an "incubation deal", which provides funding, office space, equipment and advice in the form of help from Santa Monica Studio.

The finished game uses Gamebryo LightSpeed and was initially released for the PlayStation 3. It was released on Microsoft Windows and iOS on September 10, 2020.

=== Soundtrack ===
The score to The Unfinished Swan, composed by Joel Corelitz, mixes electronic music with a string orchestra and string quartet. The orchestra and string quartet were recorded in Nashville at Ocean Way Studios by the Nashville Music Scoring orchestra. The music often provides hints to the player by changing in style as the player makes progress through the puzzles.

== Reception ==
Reception

Aggregate score
Aggregator	Score
Metacritic	PS3: 79/100; PS4: 83/100

Review scores
Publication	Score
Destructoid	7.5/10
Edge	6/10
Eurogamer	6/10
Game Informer	8/10
GameSpot	6.5/10
GamesRadar+	4/5
GameTrailers	8.9/10
IGN	9.0/10
Joystiq	4/5
PlayStation Official Magazine – UK	7/10
TouchArcade	4/5

The Unfinished Swan received "generally favorable" reviews, according to review aggregator website Metacritic.

The game won two BAFTA awards in 2013, one for Game Innovation and one for Debut Game. During the 16th Annual D.I.C.E. Awards, the Academy of Interactive Arts & Sciences nominated The Unfinished Swan for "Downloadable Game of the Year", "Outstanding Innovation in Gaming", and "Outstanding Achievement in Game Direction".
