= 2019 in video games =

In the video game industry during 2019, both Sony and Microsoft announced their intent to reveal their next-generation consoles in 2020, while Nintendo introduced a smaller Nintendo Switch Lite, and Google announced its streaming game platform Stadia. The controversy over loot boxes as a potential gambling route continued into 2019, with some governments like Belgium and the Netherlands banning games with them under their gambling laws, while the United Kingdom acknowledging their current laws prevent enforcing these as if they were games of chance. The first video cards to support real-time ray tracing were put onto the consumer market, including the first set of games that would take advantage of the new technology. The Epic Games Store continued its growth in challenging the largest digital PC game distribution service Steam, leading to concern and debate about Epic Games' methods to seek games for its service. Dota Auto Chess, a community-created mod for Dota 2, introduced a new subgenre of strategy games called auto battlers, which saw several games in the genre released throughout the year. Blizzard Entertainment faced criticism due to their involvement in the Blitzchung controversy, which began after they had banned a Hearthstone player for making comments during a tournament regarding the 2019–20 Hong Kong protests.

Series with new installments in 2019 include Ace Combat, Age of Wonders, Bloodstained, Borderlands, Bubsy, Call of Duty, Contra, Crackdown, Crash Bandicoot, Dead or Alive, Devil May Cry, Digimon, Dr. Mario, Earth Defense Force, Far Cry, Final Fantasy, Fire Emblem, Gears of War, God Eater, Kingdom Hearts, Kirby, Luigi's Mansion, Mario & Sonic, Marvel: Ultimate Alliance, MediEvil, Metro, MLB The Show, Mortal Kombat, Need for Speed, No More Heroes, Onimusha, Persona, Pokémon, Rage, Resident Evil, Rivals of Aether, Science Adventure, Shantae, Shenmue, Sonic the Hedgehog, Star Wars, Super Mario, Terminator, Tetris, The Legend of Zelda, Tom Clancy's Ghost Recon, Tom Clancy's The Division, Total War, Trials, Tropico, Umihara Kawase, Vampire: The Masquerade, Wolfenstein, WWE 2K, Yooka-Laylee, Yoshi, and Yu-Gi-Oh!.

== Financial performance ==
SuperData Research estimated that the video game industry grew 4% in 2019, reaching $120.1 billion in global revenues. SuperData stated the market was dominated by mobile games which made up $64.4 billion, with personal computer games at $29.6 billion and console games at $15.4 billion.

App Annie, which tracks all mobile app sales, estimated that mobile games accounted for 72% of the $120 billion spent on the various app stores in 2019, or $86 billion, with the potential to exceed $100 billion by 2020. Mobile game expenditures made up 56% of all video game-related revenues in 2019.

=== Highest-grossing games ===
The following were 2019's top ten highest-grossing video games in terms of worldwide digital revenue (including digital purchases, microtransactions, free-to-play and pay-to-play) across all platforms (including mobile, PC and console platforms). The top ten highest-grossing digital games of the year were all free-to-play games, each grossing more than $1 billion worldwide in 2019. Six of the top ten highest-grossing games, including the top five titles, are published and/or owned by Chinese conglomerate Tencent.

| Rank | Game | Revenue | Publisher(s) | Genre(s) | Business model | Ref. |
|---|---|---|---|---|---|---|
| 1 | Fortnite | $3,709,000,000 | Epic Games (Tencent) | Battle royale, Survival | Free-to-play | |
| 2 | PlayerUnknown's Battlegrounds (PUBG) | $1,788,000,000 | Bluehole / Tencent | Battle royale | Free-to-play / buy-to-play | (Note: PlayerUnknown's Battlegrounds digital revenue: PUBG Mobile / Game for Peace (free-to-play) – $1.5 billion; PC and consoles (buy-to-play) – $288 million) |
| 3 | Dungeon Fighter Online | $1,600,000,000 | Nexon / Tencent | Beat 'em up | Free-to-play | |
| 4 | Honor of Kings / Arena of Valor | $1,600,000,000 | Tencent | MOBA | Free-to-play | |
| 5 | League of Legends | $1,500,000,000 | Riot Games / Tencent | MOBA | Free-to-play | |
| 6 | Candy Crush Saga | $1,500,000,000 | King (Activision Blizzard) | Puzzle | Free-to-play | |
| 7 | Pokémon Go | $1,400,000,000 | Niantic / Nintendo / The Pokémon Company | AR | Free-to-play | |
| 8 | Crossfire | $1,400,000,000 | Smilegate / Tencent | FPS | Free-to-play | |
| 9 | Fate/Grand Order | $1,200,000,000 | Aniplex (Sony Music Entertainment Japan) | RPG | Free-to-play | |
| 10 | Last Shelter: Survival | $1,100,000,000 | Long Tech | Simulation | Free-to-play | |

=== Best-selling games by country ===
The following were 2019's top ten best-selling video games by country, in terms of software units sold (excluding microtransactions and free-to-play titles) on PC and console platforms, for the United States, Japan, and United Kingdom.

| Rank | Japan (Note: Not including PC sales) | United Kingdom (Note: Physical sales only) | United States |
|---|---|---|---|
| 1 | Pokémon Sword / Shield | FIFA 20 | Call of Duty: Modern Warfare |
| 2 | Super Smash Bros. Ultimate | Call of Duty: Modern Warfare | NBA 2K20 |
| 3 | Kingdom Hearts III | Mario Kart 8 Deluxe | Madden NFL 20 |
| 4 | Super Mario Maker 2 | Star Wars Jedi: Fallen Order | Borderlands 3 |
| 5 | Monster Hunter World: Iceborne | Pokémon Sword / Shield | Mortal Kombat 11 |
| 6 | New Super Mario Bros. U Deluxe | Red Dead Redemption 2 | Kingdom Hearts III |
| 7 | Monster Hunter World: Iceborne Master Edition | FIFA 19 | Tom Clancy's The Division 2 |
| 8 | Mario Kart 8 Deluxe | Crash Team Racing Nitro-Fueled | Pokémon Sword / Shield |
| 9 | Minecraft: Nintendo Switch Edition | Grand Theft Auto V | Super Smash Bros. Ultimate |
| 10 | Luigi's Mansion 3 | Tom Clancy's The Division 2 | Star Wars Jedi: Fallen Order |

== Top-rated games ==
=== Critically acclaimed games ===
Metacritic is an aggregator of video game journalism reviews. It generally considers expansions and re-releases as separate entities.

Releases scoring higher than 90/100 in 2019
| Title | Developer(s) | Publisher(s) | Release | Platform(s) | MC score |
|---|---|---|---|---|---|
| Divinity: Original Sin II – Definitive Edition | Larian Studios | | September 4, 2019 | NS | 93 |
| Red Dead Redemption 2 | Rockstar Games | | November 5, 2019 | WIN | 93 |
| Beat Saber | Beat Games | | May 21, 2019 | WIN | 93 |
| Resident Evil 2 | Capcom | | January 25, 2019 | XBO | 93 |
| Dragon Quest XI S: Echoes of an Elusive Age – Definitive Edition | Square Enix | | September 27, 2019 | NS | 91 |
| Sekiro: Shadows Die Twice | FromSoftware | Activision | March 22, 2019 | XBO | 91 |
| Final Fantasy XIV: Shadowbringers | Square Enix | | July 2, 2019 | PS4 | 91 |
| Disco Elysium | ZA/UM | | October 15, 2019 | WIN | 91 |
| Nier: Automata – Game of the Yorha Edition | PlatinumGames | Square Enix | February 26, 2019 | PS4 | 91 |
| Resident Evil 2 | Capcom | | January 25, 2019 | PS4 | 91 |
| Final Fantasy XIV: Shadowbringers | Square Enix | | July 2, 2019 | WIN | 90 |
| Monster Hunter: World – Iceborne | Capcom | | September 6, 2019 | XBO | 90 |
| Ori and the Blind Forest: Definitive Edition | Moon Studios | Microsoft Studios | September 27, 2019 | NS | 90 |
| Tetris Effect | Monstars, Resonair | Enhance Games | July 23, 2019 | WIN | 90 |
| Sekiro: Shadows Die Twice | FromSoftware | Activision | March 22, 2019 | PS4 | 90 |

=== Major awards ===
| Category/Organization | | 37th Golden Joystick Awards November 16, 2019 | The Game Awards 2019 December 12, 2019 | 23rd Annual D.I.C.E. Awards February 13, 2020 | 20th Game Developers Choice Awards March 18, 2020 | | 16th British Academy Games Awards April 2, 2020 |
|---|---|---|---|---|---|---|---|
| Game of the Year | | Resident Evil 2 | Sekiro: Shadows Die Twice | Untitled Goose Game | | | Outer Wilds |
| Independent / Debut (Note: Some award presentations combine these categories.) | Indie | Outer Wilds | Disco Elysium | Untitled Goose Game | Disco Elysium | | |
| Independent / Debut | Debut | Outer Wilds | Disco Elysium | Untitled Goose Game | Disco Elysium | | |
| Mobile/Portable | | BTS World | Call of Duty: Mobile | Sayonara Wild Hearts | What the Golf? | | Call of Duty: Mobile |
| VR/AR | | Beat Saber | | Pistol Whip | Vader Immortal: A Star Wars VR Series | | —N/a |
| Artistic Achievement | Animation | Devil May Cry 5 | Control | Luigi's Mansion 3 | Control | | Luigi's Mansion 3 |
| Artistic Achievement | Art Direction | Devil May Cry 5 | Control | Control | Control | | Sayonara Wild Hearts |
| Audio | Music | Resident Evil 2 | Death Stranding | Control | Control | | Disco Elysium |
| Audio | Sound Design | Resident Evil 2 | Call of Duty: Modern Warfare | Death Stranding | Control | | Ape Out |
| Character or Performance | Leading Role | Logan Marshall-Green as David Smith; Telling Lies | Mads Mikkelsen as Cliff Unger; Death Stranding | The Goose; Untitled Goose Game | —N/a | | Gonzalo Martin as Sean Diaz; Life Is Strange 2 |
| Character or Performance | Supporting Role | Logan Marshall-Green as David Smith; Telling Lies | Mads Mikkelsen as Cliff Unger; Death Stranding | The Goose; Untitled Goose Game | —N/a | | Martti Suosalo as Ahti the Janitor; Control |
| Game Direction or Design | Game Design | —N/a | Death Stranding | Baba Is You | Baba Is You | | Outer Wilds |
| Game Direction or Design | Game Direction | —N/a | Death Stranding | Control | Baba Is You | | Outer Wilds |
| Narrative | | Days Gone | Disco Elysium | | | | |
| Technical Achievement | | —N/a | | Death Stranding | Control | | Death Stranding |
| Multiplayer/Online | | Apex Legends | | | —N/a | | Apex Legends |
| Action | | —N/a | Devil May Cry 5 | Control | —N/a | | |
| Adventure | | —N/a | Sekiro: Shadows Die Twice | Star Wars Jedi: Fallen Order | —N/a | | |
| Family | | —N/a | Luigi's Mansion 3 | Super Mario Maker 2 | —N/a | | Untitled Goose Game |
| Fighting | | —N/a | Super Smash Bros. Ultimate | Mortal Kombat 11 | —N/a | | |
| Role-Playing | | —N/a | Disco Elysium | The Outer Worlds | —N/a | | |
| Sports/Racing | Sports | —N/a | Crash Team Racing Nitro-Fueled | FIFA 20 | —N/a | | |
| Sports/Racing | Racing | —N/a | Crash Team Racing Nitro-Fueled | Mario Kart Tour | —N/a | | |
| Strategy/Simulation | | —N/a | Fire Emblem: Three Houses | | —N/a | | |
| Social Impact | | —N/a | Gris | —N/a | | | Kind Words |
| Special Award | | Lifetime Achievement | —N/a | Hall of Fame | Ambassador Award | Pioneer Award | BAFTA Fellowship |
| Special Award | | Yu Suzuki | —N/a | Connie Booth | Kate Edwards | Roberta Williams | Hideo Kojima |

== Major events ==
| Date | Event | Ref. |
|---|---|---|
| January 10 | Bungie terminated its publishing deal with Activision, maintaining rights to the Destiny series. | |
| January 30 | Nintendo ceases service operations of the Wii Shop Channel app for the Nintendo Wii. | |
| February 4 | Respawn Entertainment and Electronic Arts surprise-released Apex Legends, a battle royale game that within a week gained 25 million players and challenged the dominance of Fortnite Battle Royale. | |
| February 11–13 | Academy of Interactive Arts & Sciences hosted the 2019 D.I.C.E. Summit and 22nd Annual D.I.C.E. Awards at the Aria Resort and Casino in Las Vegas, Nevada. Bonnie Ross was inducted into the AIAS Hall of Fame. | |
| February 12 | Activision Blizzard announced that despite a record quarter, it would be laying off about 8% or 775 positions, primarily from non-development sectors. | |
| February 13 | THQ Nordic acquired Warhorse Studios. | |
| March 18–22 | The 2019 Game Developers Conference was held in San Francisco. | |
| March 19 | Google revealed Stadia, a game streaming service. | |
| March 26 | Electronic Arts announced it would be cutting about 350 jobs or about 4% of its workforce. | |
| March 28–31 | PAX East was held in Boston. | |
| March 31 | Dies irae and Silverio developer Light suspended activity as its parent company Greenwood dissolved. | |
| April 13–14 | The inaugural Twitchcon Europe was held in Berlin. | |
| April 15 | Reggie Fils-Aimé retired as president and CEO of Nintendo of America and was replaced by Doug Bowser. | |
| May 1 | Epic Games acquired Rocket League developer Psyonix. | |
| May 7 | Microsoft released the "All-Digital" version of the Xbox One S console, which lacks an optical drive for a lower price point. | |
| May 10 | Sega acquired Two Point Studios, the creator of Two Point Hospital. | |
| June 9 | Xbox Game Studios announced their acquisition of Double Fine, the developers of the Psychonauts series. | |
| June 9 | Microsoft announced their next-generation Xbox console, Project Scarlett. | |
| June 11–13 | E3 2019 was held in Los Angeles, California. | |
| June 18 | Kaz Hirai retired from Sony Corporation after serving the company for 35 years, most recently as CEO and chairman for 6 years. | |
| June 19 | Popular streamer and YouTuber Etika disappeared; his body was discovered in the East River five days later in an act of suicide by drowning. | |
| July 12 | Chiyomaru Studio acquired Science Adventure developer Mages. | |
| July 26–28 | The inaugural Fortnite World Cup was held at Arthur Ashe Stadium in New York City. | |
| August 16–18 | The Pokémon World Championships was held at the Walter E. Washington Convention Center in Washington, D.C., United States. | |
| August 19 | Worldwide Studios announced the acquisition of Insomniac Games for $229 million. The deal was completed on November 15. | |
| August 20–24 | Gamescom 2019 was held in Cologne, Germany. | |
| August 20–25 | The International 2019, the ninth iteration of the annual Dota 2 global esports tournament, was held in Shanghai. | |
| August 28 | LCG Entertainment acquired the remaining assets of Telltale Games and relaunched it as a new company. | |
| August 31 – September 3 | PAX West was held in Seattle. | |
| September 5 | Nintendo Switch Online adds Super Nintendo Entertainment System titles to its library of emulated games. | |
| September 12–15 | Tokyo Game Show was held in Chiba, Japan. | |
| September 17 | Valve lost a lawsuit in France, requiring the company to allow users to resell games on Steam required by Directives from the European Union. | |
| September 19 | Apple Arcade, a game subscription service by Apple Inc., launched. | |
| September 27–29 | TwitchCon was held at San Diego, California | |
| September 29 | The San Francisco Shock won the 2019 Overwatch League Grand Finals over the Vancouver Titans | |
| September 30 | Shawn Layden announced his departure as CEO of Worldwide Studios. | |
| October 1 | Japanese developer AlphaDream filed for bankruptcy. | |
| October 6–11 | Blizzard Entertainment dealt with fallout from issuing bans related to pro-Hong Kong speech at the Hearthstone Grandmasters event. | |
| October 11–13 | PAX Australia was held in Melbourne. | |
| October 25 | The defunct developer Light was revived to finish their Silverio series in a collaboration with Ares Co. and Nexton. | |
| October 29 | Electronic Arts announced they would begin to publish games again on Valve's Steam service. They had originally stopped in 2011. | |
| November 1–2 | BlizzCon was held at the Anaheim Convention Center in Anaheim, California. | |
| November 7 | Sony Interactive Entertainment announced that Hermen Hulst would become the new head of Worldwide Studios, while Shuhei Yoshida became the "Head of Independent Developer Initiative" at PlayStation. | |
| November 13 | Human Head Studios closed down while transitioning its employees to the newly formed Roundhouse Studios under Bethesda Softworks. | |
| November 27 | Facebook acquired Beat Games. | |
| November 28 | Codemasters acquired Slightly Mad Studios for $30 million. | |
| December 6 | Starbreeze Studios completed a year-long restructuring process. | |
| December 12 | The Game Awards 2019 were held at Microsoft Theater in Los Angeles. | |
| December 12 | Microsoft unveiled the design and name of their next-generation Xbox console previously known as Project Scarlett, the Xbox Series X, set for a late 2020 release. | |
| December 19 | Stadia Games and Entertainment acquired Typhoon Studios. | |

== Notable deaths ==
- March 4 – Luke Perry, 52, actor who played Sub-Zero in Mortal Kombat: Defenders of the Realm.
- May 14 – Tim Conway, 85, voice actor best known for the character Barnacle Boy in the SpongeBob SquarePants franchise.
- June 24 – Etika, 29, YouTuber and Twitch streamer who played Nintendo games.
- August 31 – Alec Holowka, 35, co-game designer on Night in the Woods and former co-founder of Infinite Fall.
- October 2 – John Kirby, 79, lawyer who represented Nintendo in Universal v. Nintendo and namesake of Kirby.

== Hardware releases ==
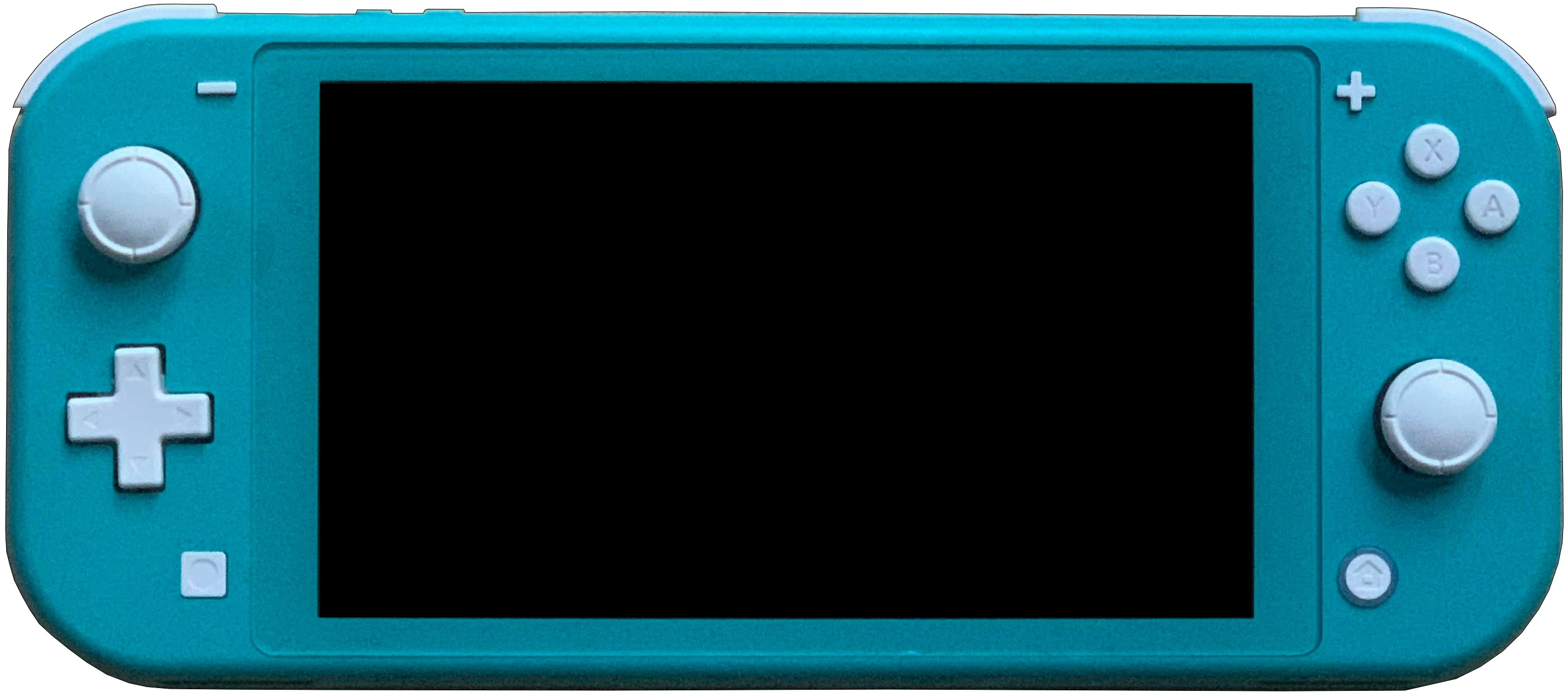
Nintendo Switch Lite

The list of game-related hardware released in 2019 in North America.

| Date | Console | Developer | Ref. |
|---|---|---|---|
| March 25 | Mega Sg | Analogue | |
| May 7 | Xbox One S All-Digital Edition | Microsoft | |
| May 21 | Oculus Rift S | Lenovo, Oculus VR | |
| May 21 | Oculus Quest | Oculus VR | |
| June 28 | Valve Index | Valve Corporation | |
| August | Nintendo Switch (HAC-001(-01) model) | Nintendo | |
| September 19 | Sega Genesis Mini | Sega, M2 | |
| September 20 | Nintendo Switch Lite | Nintendo | |
| October 10 | Atari Flashback X | AtGames | |
| October 25 | Capcom Home Arcade | Capcom | |
| November 7 | HoloLens 2 | Microsoft | |
| November 11 | NEOGEO Arcade Stick Pro | SNK | |
| November 19 | Stadia | Google | |
| December 5 | THEC64 | Retro Games | |

== Video game-based film and television releases ==
| Title | Date | Type | Distributor(s) | Franchise | Original game publisher(s) | Ref. |
|---|---|---|---|---|---|---|
| Dead Pixels | March 28, 2019 | Television series | E4 | —N/a | —N/a | |
| Detective Pikachu | May 10, 2019 | Feature film | Warner Bros. Pictures (worldwide); Toho (Japan) | Pokémon | Nintendo; The Pokémon Company | |
| Brave Father Online: Our Story of Final Fantasy XIV | June 21, 2019 | Comedy film | Gaga Corporation | Final Fantasy | Square Enix | |
| Pokémon: Mewtwo Strikes Back—Evolution | July 12, 2019 (Note: The anime film made its VOD debut on Netflix worldwide as a "Netflix Original" in February 2020, except for Japan and Korea.) | Anime film | Toho (Japan); Netflix (international) | Pokémon | Nintendo; The Pokémon Company | |
| Dragon Quest: Your Story | August 2, 2019 (Note: The CG animated film made its VOD debut on Netflix as a "Netflix Original" in February 2020.) | CGI animated film | Toho (Japan); Netflix (international) | Dragon Quest | Square Enix | |
| The Angry Birds Movie 2 | August 13, 2019 | CGI animated film | Sony Pictures Releasing | Angry Birds | Rovio Entertainment | |
| The King's Avatar: For the Glory | August 16, 2019 | Chinese animated film | Wanda Media (China); Amazon Prime Video (international) | —N/a | —N/a | |
| NiNoKuni | August 23, 2019 | Anime film | Warner Bros. | Ni no Kuni | Bandai Namco Entertainment | |
| Doom: Annihilation | October 1, 2019 | Feature film | Universal Pictures Home Entertainment | Doom | Bethesda Softworks | |
| Pokémon Journeys: The Series | November 17, 2019 (Note: The series debuted on Netflix in June 2020, and released consequent batches of episodes every 3 months till March 2021.) | Anime television series | TV Tokyo (Japan); Netflix (United States) | Pokémon | Nintendo; The Pokémon Company | |
| Jumanji: The Next Level | December 13, 2019 | Feature film | Sony Pictures Motion Picture Group | Jumanji | —N/a | |

== See also ==
- 2019 in esports
- 2019 in games
