= 10th British Academy Games Awards =

Game award ceremony in 2014

- Date: 12 March 2014
- Location: Tobacco Dock
- Hosted by: Dara Ó Briain
- Best Game: The Last of Us
- Most awards: The Last of Us (5)
- Most nominations: The Last of Us (10)

The 10th British Academy Video Game Awards awarded by the British Academy of Film and Television Arts, is an award ceremony that was held on 12 March 2014 at Tobacco Dock. The ceremony honoured achievement in video gaming in 2013 and was hosted by Dara Ó Briain.

== Winners and nominees ==
The nominees for the 10th British Academy Video Games Awards were announced on 12 February 2014.

The winners were announced during the awards ceremony on 12 March 2014.

=== Awards ===
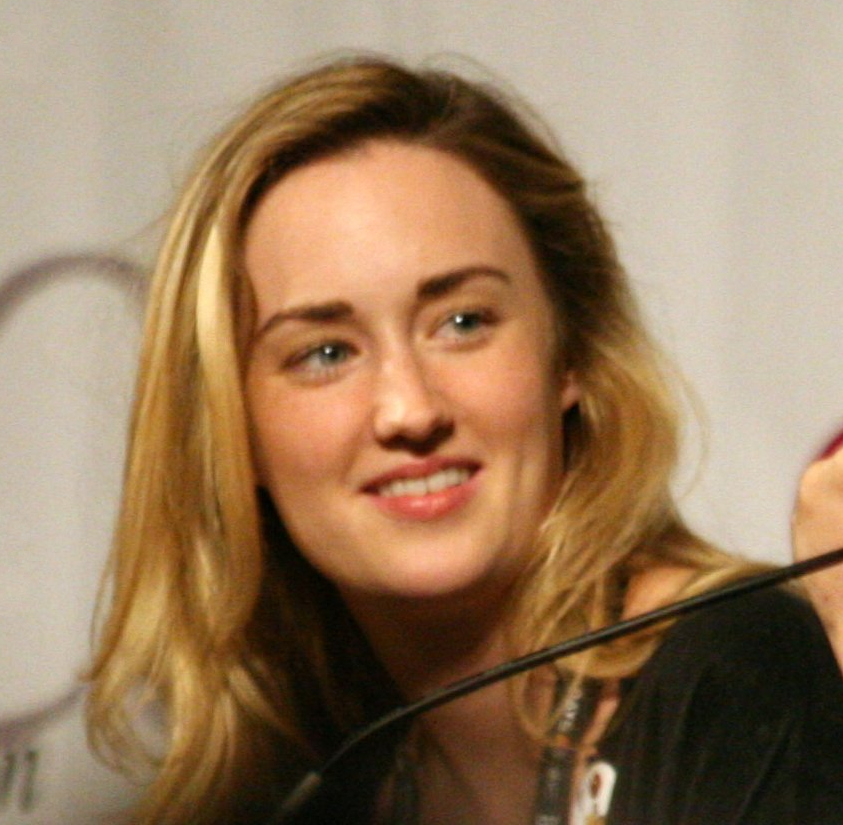
Ashley Johnson, winner of the Performer award.

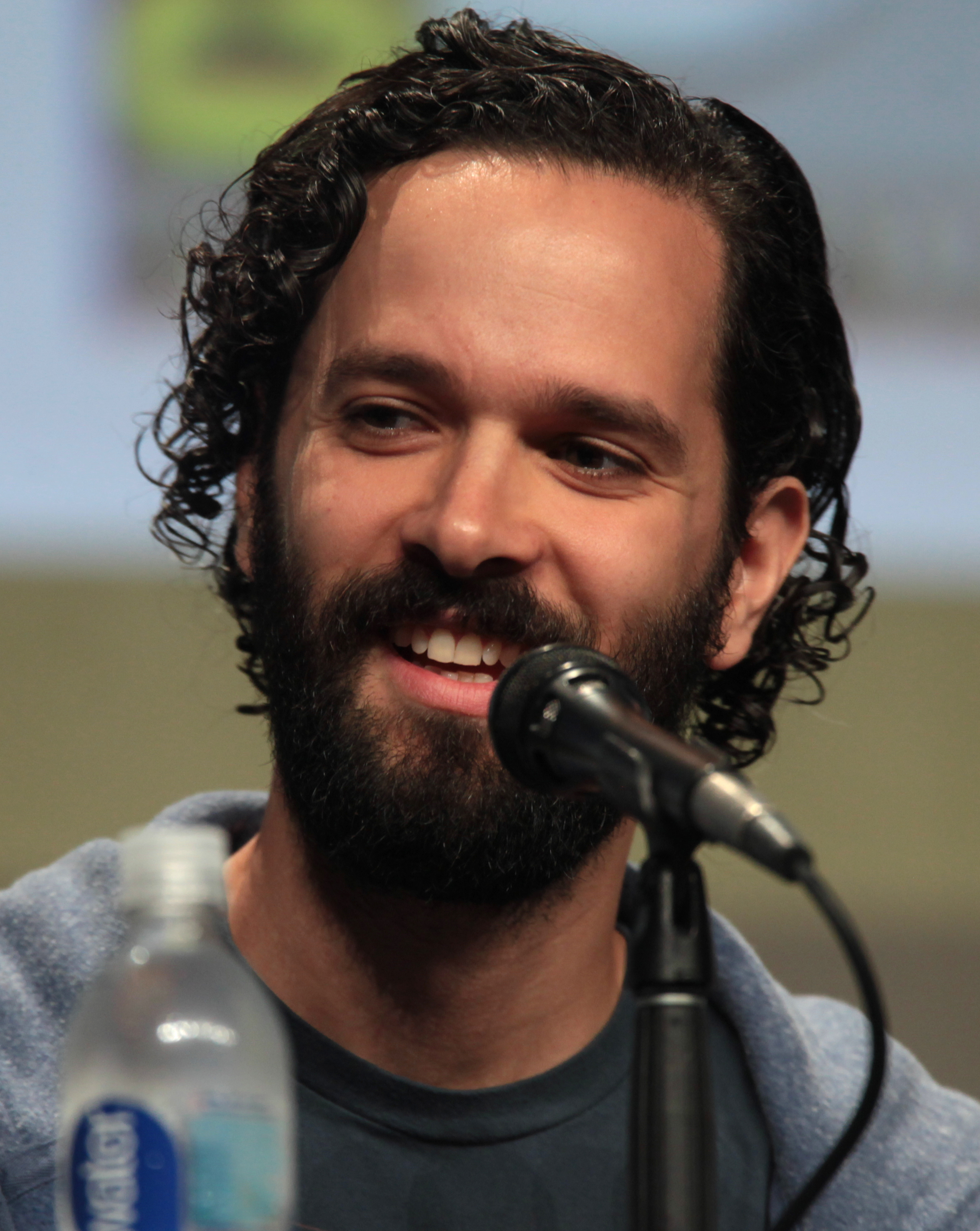
Neil Druckmann, winner of the Story award.

Rockstar Games won the BAFTA Fellowship, the second company to do so after Merchant Ivory Productions. The award was accepted by Dan Houser, Sam Houser, Leslie Benzies and Aaron Garbut.

Winners are shown first in bold.

**Action & Adventure**: **The Last of Us – Naughty Dog/Sony Computer Entertainment**; Assassin's Creed IV: Black Flag – Ubisoft Montreal/Ubisoft; Badland – Johannes Vuorinen and Juhana Myllys, Frogmind Games/Frogmind Games; Grand Theft Auto V – Rockstar North/Rockstar Games; Lego Marvel Super Heroes – Jon Burton, Arthur Parsons and Phillip Ring, Traveller's Tales/Warner Bros. Interactive Entertainment; Tomb Raider – Crystal Dynamics/Square Enix	**Game Innovation**: **Brothers: A Tale of Two Sons – Starbreeze Studios/505 Games**; Grand Theft Auto V – Rockstar North/Rockstar Games; Papers, Please – Lucas Pope, 3909 LLC/3909 LLC; The Stanley Parable – Galactic Cafe/Galactic Cafe; Tearaway – Tarsier Studios and Media Molecule/Sony Computer Entertainment Europe; Year Walk – Simogo/Simogo
**Artistic Achievement**: **Tearaway – Tarsier Studios and Media Molecule/Sony Computer Entertainment Europe**; Beyond: Two Souls – John Rostron, David Cage and Guillaume De Fondaumiere, Quantic Dream/Sony Computer Entertainment; BioShock Infinite – Patrick Balthrop, Scott Haraldsen and James Bonney, Irrational Games/2K Games; Device 6 – Simogo/Simogo; The Last of Us – Naughty Dog/Sony Computer Entertainment; Ni no Kuni: Wrath of the White Witch – Yoshiyuki Momose, Level-5/Bandai Namco Games	**Mobile & Handheld**: **Tearaway – Tarsier Studios and Media Molecule/Sony Computer Entertainment Europe**; Badland – Johannes Vuorinen and Juhana Myllys, Frogmind Games/Frogmind Games; Device 6 – Simogo/Simogo; Plants vs. Zombies 2: It's About Time – PopCap Games/Electronic Arts; Ridiculous Fishing – Vlambeer/Vlambeer; The Room Two – Fireproof Games
**Audio Achievement**: **The Last of Us – Naughty Dog/Sony Computer Entertainment**; Battlefield 4 – EA DICE/Electronic Arts; BioShock Infinite – Patrick Balthrop, Scott Haraldsen and James Bonney, Irrational Games/2K Games; Device 6 – Simogo/Simogo; Grand Theft Auto V – Rockstar North/Rockstar Games; Tomb Raider – Crystal Dynamics/Square Enix	**Multiplayer**: **Grand Theft Auto V – Rockstar North/Rockstar Games**; World of Tanks – Wargaming/Wargaming; Super Mario 3D World – Nintendo EAD Tokyo and 1-Up Studio/Nintendo; The Last of Us – Naughty Dog/Sony Computer Entertainment; Dota 2 – Valve/Valve; Battlefield 4 – EA DICE/Electronic Arts
**Best Game**: **The Last of Us – Naughty Dog/Sony Computer Entertainment**; Assassin's Creed IV: Black Flag – Ubisoft Montreal/Ubisoft; Grand Theft Auto V – Rockstar North/Rockstar Games; Papers, Please – Lucas Pope, 3909 LLC/3909 LLC; Super Mario 3D World – Nintendo EAD Tokyo and 1-Up Studio/Nintendo; Tearaway – Tarsier Studios and Media Molecule/Sony Computer Entertainment Europe	**Original Music**: **BioShock Infinite – James Bonney and Garry Schyman, Irrational Games/2K Games**; Tearaway – Kenneth C M Young and Brian D'Oliveira, Tarsier Studios and Media Molecule/Sony Computer Entertainment Europe; Super Mario 3D World – Mahito Yokota and Koji Kondo, Nintendo EAD Tokyo and 1-Up Studio/Nintendo; The Last of Us – Gustavo Santaolalla, Naughty Dog/Sony Computer Entertainment; Beyond: Two Souls – Lorne Balfe, Quantic Dream/Sony Computer Entertainment; Assassin's Creed IV: Black Flag – Brian Tyler and Aldo Sampaio, Ubisoft Montreal/Ubisoft
**British Game**: **Grand Theft Auto V – Rockstar North/Rockstar Games**; Tearaway – Tarsier Studios and Media Molecule/Sony Computer Entertainment Europe; The Room Two – Fireproof Games; Lego Marvel Super Heroes – Jon Burton, Arthur Parsons and Phillip Ring, Traveller's Tales/Warner Bros. Interactive Entertainment; Gunpoint – Tom Francis, John Roberts and Ryan Ike, Suspicious Developments/Suspicious Developments; DmC: Devil May Cry – Ninja Theory/Capcom	**Performer**: **Ashley Johnson –** **The Last of Us as Ellie**; Courtnee Draper – BioShock Infinite as Elizabeth; Elliot Page – Beyond: Two Souls as Jodie; Kevan Brighting – The Stanley Parable as The Narrator; Steven Ogg – Grand Theft Auto V as Trevor Philips; Troy Baker – The Last of Us as Joel
**Debut Game**: **Gone Home – Fullbright/Fullbright**; The Stanley Parable – Galactic Cafe/Galactic Cafe; Remember Me – Jean-Maxime Moris, Hervé Bonin and Oskar Guilbert, Dontnod Entertainment/Capcom; Gunpoint – Tom Francis, John Roberts and Ryan Ike, Suspicious Developments/Suspicious Developments; Castles in the Sky – Jack de Quidt and Dan Pearce; Badland – Johannes Vuorinen, Juhana Myllys, Frogmind Games/Frogmind Games	**Sports**: **FIFA 14 – EA Canada/EA Sports**; F1 2013 – Codemasters/Codemasters; NBA 2K14 – Visual Concepts/2K Sports; GRID 2 – Codemasters/Codemasters; Forza Motorsport 5 – Bill Giese, Dave Gierok and Barry Feather, Turn 10 Studios/Microsoft Studios; Football Manager 2014 – Sports Interactive/Sega
**Family**: **Tearaway – Tarsier Studios and Media Molecule/Sony Computer Entertainment Europe**; Animal Crossing: New Leaf – Nintendo EAD/Nintendo; Super Mario 3D World – Nintendo EAD Tokyo and 1-Up Studio/Nintendo; Skylanders: Swap Force – Vicarious Visions/Activision; Rayman Legends – Michael Ancel, Christophe Heral and Jean-Christophe Alessandri, Ubisoft/Ubisoft; Brothers: A Tale of Two Sons – Starbreeze Studios/505 Games	**Story**: **The Last of Us – Neil Druckmann and Bruce Straley, Naughty Dog/Sony Computer Entertainment**; The Stanley Parable – Galactic Cafe/Galactic Cafe; Ni no Kuni: Wrath of the White Witch – Akihiro Hino, Level-5/Bandai Namco Games; Grand Theft Auto V – Dan Houser, Rupert Humphries, Rockstar North/Rockstar Games; Gone Home – Fullbright/Fullbright; Brothers: A Tale of Two Sons – Starbreeze Studios/505 Games
**Game Design**: **Grand Theft Auto V – Rockstar North/Rockstar Games**; Tomb Raider – Crystal Dynamics/Square Enix; Tearaway – Tarsier Studios and Media Molecule/Sony Computer Entertainment Europe; Papers, Please – Lucas Pope, 3909 LLC/3909 LLC; The Last of Us – Naughty Dog/Sony Computer Entertainment; Assassin's Creed IV: Black Flag – Ubisoft Montreal/Ubisoft	**Strategy & Simulation**: **Papers, Please – Lucas Pope, 3909 LLC/3909 LLC**; Civilization V: Brave New World – Firaxis Games/2K Games; Democracy 3 – Cliff Harris, Positech Games/Positech Games; Forza Motorsport 5 – Bill Giese, Davie Gierok and Barry Feather, Turn 10 Studios/Microsoft Studios; Surgeon Simulator 2013 – Bossa Studios/Bossa Studios; XCOM: Enemy Within – Firaxis Games/2K Games

=== BAFTA Fellowship Award ===
- **Rockstar Games**

=== BAFTA Ones to Watch Award ===
- **Size DOES Matter – Mattis Delerud, Silje Dahl, Lars Anderson, Trond Fasteraune and Nick La Rooy**

=== Games with multiple nominations and wins ===
==== Nominations ====
Nominations	Game
10	The Last of Us
9	Grand Theft Auto V
8	Tearaway
4	Assassin's Creed IV: Black Flag
4	BioShock Infinite
4	Papers, Please
4	The Stanley Parable
4	Super Mario 3D World
3	Badlands
3	Beyond: Two Souls
3	Brothers: A Tale of Two Sons
3	Device 6
3	Tomb Raider
2	Battlefield 4
2	Forza Motorsport 5
2	Gone Home
2	Gunpoint
2	Lego Marvel Super Heroes
2	Ni no Kuni: Wrath of the White Witch
2	The Room Two

==== Wins ====
Awards	Game
5	The Last of Us
3	Grand Theft Auto V
3	Tearaway
