= Lorelei and the Laser Eyes =

2024 video game

- Developer: Simogo
- Publisher: Annapurna Interactive
- Designers: Simogo; Simon Flesser
- Programmer: Magnus Gardebäck
- Artist: Simon Flesser
- Writers: Simon Flesser; Jonas Tarestad
- Composers: Daniel Olsén; Linnea Olsson; Jonathan Eng
- Engine: Unity
- Platforms: Nintendo Switch; Windows; PlayStation 4; PlayStation 5; Nintendo Switch 2
- Release: Switch, Windows; May 16, 2024; PS4, PS5; December 3, 2024; Switch 2; April 23, 2026
- Genre: Puzzle
- Mode: Single-player

Lorelei and the Laser Eyes is a 2024 puzzle game developed by Simogo and published by Annapurna Interactive centered on exploring and problem-solving across a massive hotel, without prior explanation as to the player's whereabouts, identity, or relations. This information is instead revealed over the course of the game. Likened to classic point-and-click adventure games such as the Monkey Island series, the game has been described as "one big puzzle box" by IGN. The game was released for Nintendo Switch and Windows on 16 May 2024, PlayStation 4 and PlayStation 5 on 3 December 2024, and Nintendo Switch 2 on 23 April 2026. The game was nominated for Independent Game Of The Year at The Game Awards 2024.

== Gameplay ==
Rather than being provided with exposition, the player is simply put into the shoes of a woman outside her car in front of a large, black and white hotel. The player is solely given the objective to "find the truth", and must explore the mansion to find out the circumstances of her arrival, while the situation becomes progressively more "dangerous and surreal". The game features more than 150 puzzles, which can be completed in a non-linear sequence. These problems frequently require knowledge of specific symbols, such as Roman numerals, the Greek alphabet, and Astrological symbols. These puzzles are randomized for each playthrough, such that players are unable to solely consult a guide for the solution to a puzzle. The game is played from a third-person perspective, and the player can interact with various characters and objects. The game also possesses a one-button control system, where all interactions with the environment are governed by pressing any button. The game features manual saves, and some puzzles result in a game over if the player fails to answer a question correctly.

== Plot ==
In 1962, Lorelei Weiss, a 30-year-old artist who specializes in puzzle boxes and interactive computer games, becomes fascinated with Un Animal Terrible, a film by eccentric director Renzo Nero. She writes to him, and he lambasts the film and invites her to create "real art" with him at the Hotel Letztes Jahr ("Hotel Last Year") in January 1963. Upon arriving, Lorelei meets Renzo, whose behaviors are unpredictable, offputting, and concerning. He tasks her with creating an interactive computer maze, which requires heavily experimental technology for the computer systems of the 1960s.

Meanwhile, Renzo works on his newest film, The Third Eye, set in 1847 and focusing on a magician named Lorenzo and a woman named Renate. The Third Eye ends with Renate gouging out her eyes and Lorenzo pushing her out of a third-story window in fear. Unbeknownst to Lorelei, the "true art" Renzo seeks to create is a recreation of the film's events, with himself as Renate and Lorelei as Lorenzo. He continually provokes Lorelei, including deleting her maze after its completion, before gouging out his eyes and approaching her with a revolver. With Renzo holding a firm grip, Lorelei's only choice is to push Renzo out of the window, mirroring the ending to The Third Eye.

Lorelei retreats from the art world and becomes known almost entirely for the 1963 incident with Renzo. On her deathbed in 2014, she relives the experience one last time, which is the perspective from which the player sees the event as a whole. After solving the various puzzles and mysteries throughout the mansion, the player unlocks a supercomputer in the basement of the hotel, triggering an ending sequence where an apparition of Renzo speaks to the elderly Lorelei before closing her eyes.

== Development ==
Lorelei and the Laser Eyes is the ninth game developed by Simogo, which had previously created games such as Device 6 and Sayonara Wild Hearts. Unlike Sayonara Wild Hearts, the game is mostly colored in black and white, with occasional uses of bright red. These flashes of red were used partially to direct players, but also "to play with... such a weird style." The studio wanted to create a "3D collage, a fragmented memory world", and therefore combined various visual styles, using "photographs, low-polygon geometry, line-rendering, and distinct sharp shading on higher res-characters" to create a surreal atmosphere. According to Simon Flesser, the game's director, the team wanted to evoke "a constant feeling of ambivalence" and "a sense of absurdity", in which players will begin to question what is happening due to the peculiar scenarios presented in the game's story. He further went on to add that the puzzles designed in the game were also built "around the idea of the players understanding the connection between things." In 2026, Simogo released an internal trailer created in 2020 which showed the game feature large monsters; the company's social media account confirmed that the game originally featured combat sequences.

According to Flesser, the decision to implement a one-button control system arose from a desire to deemphasize dexterity and increase accessibility for all audiences. Additionally, the development team was drawn to this unconventional form, and believed it "interesting... to try to sort of find a new solution." This design influenced the game's structure, which Flesser described as an "always-forward, never-backward" design where players were forced to commit to their decisions. Lorelei and the Laser Eyes was inspired by a variety of films, particularly of the silent film genre, including Last Year at Marienbad, as well as the novel The Magus.

In March 2020, Annapurna Interactive and Simogo announced a multi-year agreement to publish Simogo's games further after the success of Sayonara Wild Hearts in 2019. During the Nintendo Direct Mini: Partner Showcase in June 2022, the game was officially revealed. While the game was set to be released in 2023, an update during the Annapurna Interactive Showcase in June 2023 reveals the game delayed with a cyphered message around its launch. The release date was finally revealed later during the Indie World Showcase in April 2024 with the game being set to launch on May 16, 2024.

Lorelei and the Laser Eyes was released for Nintendo Switch 2 on April 23, 2026.

== Reception ==
Reception

Aggregate scores
Aggregator	Score
Metacritic	NS: 88/100; PS5: 91/100; Win: 88/100
OpenCritic	94% recommend

Review scores
Publication	Score
Destructoid	9/10
Digital Trends	5/5
Eurogamer	4/5
Game Informer	8.75/10
GameSpot	9/10
GamesRadar+	4.5/5
Hardcore Gamer	5/5
IGN	9/10
Nintendo Life	8/10
PC Gamer (US)	89/100
Push Square	8/10
Shacknews	8/10
The Guardian	5/5
TouchArcade	5/5

=== Critical response ===
Lorelei and the Laser Eyes received "generally favorable" reviews from critics for its Nintendo Switch and Windows versions, and "universal acclaim" for the PlayStation 5 version, according to the review aggregator website Metacritic. OpenCritic determined that 94% of critics recommended the game.

IGN described the game as "one big, masterfully assembled puzzle box," praising the wide variety of puzzle design and the freedom afforded to the player, while criticizing the one-button control system. Another review by Polygon praised the game's complexity and difficulty, as well as the character of Renzo Nero, likening him to characters of Twin Peaks and The X-Files.

=== Awards ===
Lorelei and the Laser Eyes received nominations for its storytelling and for Best Indie Game at the Golden Joystick Awards. It was also nominated for Best Independent Game at the Game Awards in 2024. The game appeared on several lists of the top video games of 2024, being ranked in third place by the Associated Press and eighth place by The A.V. Club. In 2025, Lorelei and the Laser Eyes received a nomination for "Outstanding Achievement in Game Direction" at the 28th Annual D.I.C.E. Awards.

Year	Ceremony	Category	Result	Ref.
2024	Golden Joystick Awards	Best Storytelling	Nominated	
2024	Golden Joystick Awards	Best Indie Game	Nominated	
2024	The Game Awards 2024	Best Independent Game	Nominated	
2025	New York Game Awards	Off Broadway Award for Best Indie Game	Nominated	
2025	28th Annual D.I.C.E. Awards	Outstanding Achievement in Game Direction	Nominated	
2025	25th Game Developers Choice Awards	Best Audio	Honorable mention	
2025	25th Game Developers Choice Awards	Best Design	Nominated	
2025	25th Game Developers Choice Awards	Innovation Award	Honorable mention	
