= Sayonara Wild Hearts =

2019 video game

- Developer: Simogo
- Publisher: Annapurna Interactive
- Director: Simon Flesser
- Programmer: Magnus "Gordon" Gardebäck
- Artists: Carl Karjalainen; Ása Wallander
- Composers: Daniel Olsén; Jonathan Eng
- Engine: Unity
- Platforms: iOS, macOS, Nintendo Switch, PlayStation 4, tvOS, Windows, Xbox One, PlayStation 5, Nintendo Switch 2
- Release: iOS, macOS, Nintendo Switch, PlayStation 4, tvOS; 19 September 2019; Windows; 12 December 2019; Xbox One; 25 February 2020; PlayStation 5; 24 February 2025; Nintendo Switch 2; 23 April 2026
- Genres: Rhythm, action
- Mode: Single-player

Sayonara Wild Hearts is a 2019 rhythm action video game developed by Simogo and published by Annapurna Interactive. Described as a "pop album video game", Sayonara Wild Hearts follows the story of a heartbroken young woman through a surrealistic landscape. Each level of the game is set to a song, with the player guiding the woman while collecting hearts, avoiding obstacles, and fighting enemies. The game was released for iOS, macOS and tvOS through Apple Arcade, Nintendo Switch, PlayStation 4 in September 2019, for Windows in December 2019, for Xbox One in February 2020, for PlayStation 5 in February 2025, and for Nintendo Switch 2 in April 2026. It was met with positive reviews for its visuals, soundtrack, and gameplay, and nominated for several year-end awards.

== Gameplay ==
One of the chase sequences in Sayonara Wild Hearts

Sayonara Wild Hearts is a rhythm game broken into 23 levels. In each level, the player controls the main character as they automatically travel through a surrealistic landscape alongside a pop music soundtrack. The exact mechanics of each level change, but in general the player attempts to guide the character to collect hearts across the level to earn points, while avoiding obstacles. In some levels, the player will be prompted to press a button in time with the soundtrack to make a jump or avoid an obstacle. Other levels may require the player to move a cursor on screen to target a bow-and-arrow weapon to defeat enemies, in a manner similar to Rez. During the levels, the player will encounter different boss encounters, which will incorporate a mix of movement and timed button presses to avoid attacks. The player earns points for hearts collected, timing on button presses, and avoiding obstacles, and are rated on a bronze, silver, or gold rating for each. Should the player hit an obstacle or enemy projectile, they are returned to a checkpoint. If the player fails to clear a section after a few tries, the game provides a means for the player to skip that section (The Magician), only losing out on possibly earnable points.

== Plot ==
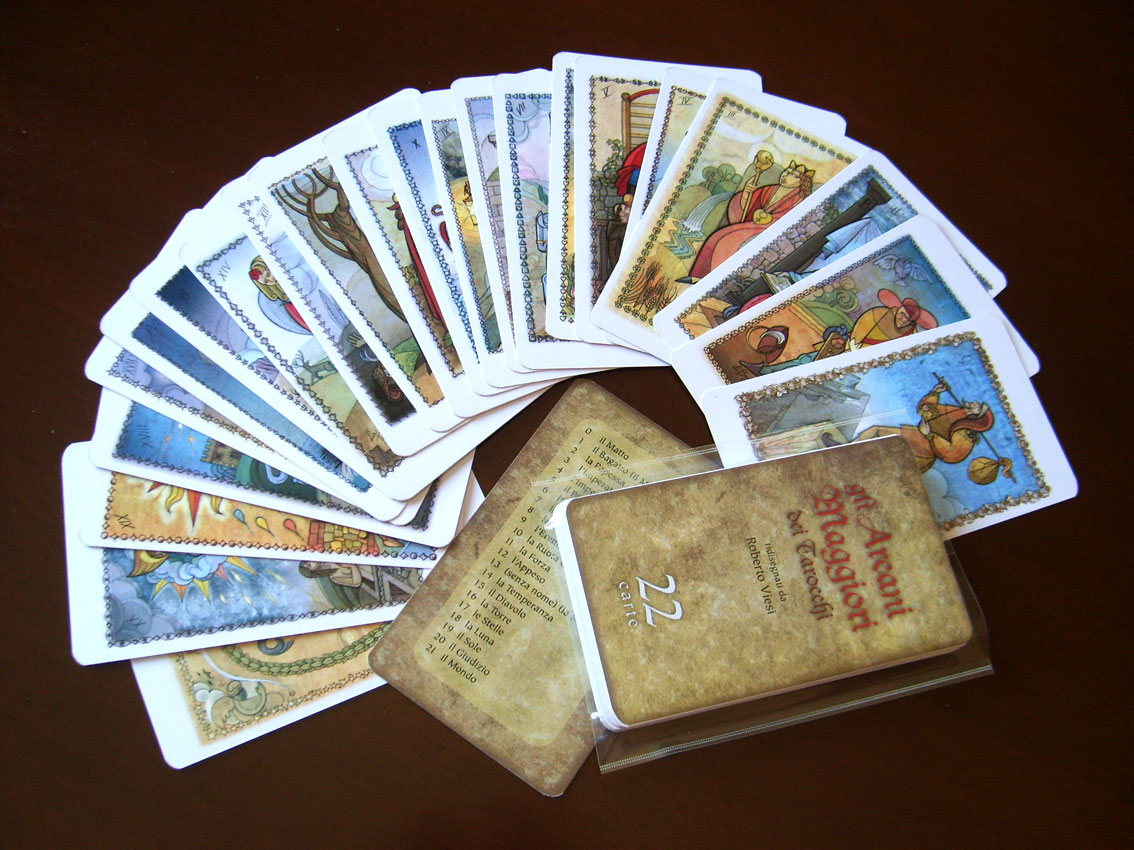
Sayonara Wild Hearts' plot is based on the Major Arcana of the tarot.

In an alternate universe watched over by three divine arcana of the Tarot (The High Priestess, The Hierophant, and The Empress), a cursed arcanum named Little Death (Death), and her allies, the Dancing Devils (The Devil), the Howling Moons (The Moon), the Stereo Lovers (The Lovers), and Hermit64 (The Hermit), stole all harmony, and hid it in their hearts. Before the divine arcana began to fade, they created a heroine from the shards of a broken heart.

In a time near the present, there lives a woman named Lorelei whose heart has been violently broken. The heroine that the divine arcana created transforms into a butterfly and flies to Lorelei, who is resting in bed. The butterfly transports her to the alternate universe. Riding her longboard along an ethereal highway, she chases the butterfly, and upon capturing it, she transforms into a masked heroine (The Fool).

She then falls through a passage and arrives in a purple and pink city. She summons a motorcycle (Wheel of Fortune), and begins to ride through it. Weaving through cars, trams and buildings, she meets a trio of devil-masked women, the Dancing Devils. They fight on the street, before riding through the city on motorcycles. Lorelei chases and defeats each member of the trio in turn, and takes back their hearts. The Fool then travels to a mythical forest. With the help of a white stag (The Emperor), she rides through the forest and meets the Howling Moons, a quartet of wolf-masked gangsters. After she chases them the quartet howls to summon a pack of wolves, and Lorelei equips her motorbike with dual automatic guns (Justice and Judgement). The masked quartet jump into a large mechanical cerberus and a battle ensures, but the Fool destroys their mech, and claims the quartet's hearts.

The Fool is then transported to a tower (The Tower), and upon climbing it, is transported to a floating city. She meets and fights a masked foe with a sword (Strength), who splits into female twins, the Stereo Lovers. The twins then snap their fingers to switch up the universe they are in every couple of seconds, but the Fool learns to do the same, and chases the twins through the city. She defeats them on top of a plane and claims their heart, before travelling to a desert. Driving a car (The Chariot) through the night, she meets Hermit64, a foe wearing a virtual reality headset as a mask. The Fool travels into the hermit's virtual reality world (The World), and obtains the heart trapped inside.

Summoning a ship (The Star) to sail across an ocean, she then arrives in a dark and rainy city. There she meets a skull-masked villainess with a scythe, Little Death. The villainess sends flying skulls (The Hanged Man) after the heroine, but she summons a bow (Temperance) and shoots them down, and likewise survives the electrified obstacles in the path (The Sun). She then defeats Little Death, but the foe's heart fragments reassemble into a gigantic final monster. After defeating it, the Fool transforms back into her former self, Lorelei. She then imagines herself as each of her former foes, and proceeds to fight each in turn. Instead of defeating them however, she forgives them with a brief kiss. The divine arcana then tell Lorelei that she has restored harmony to their world, and wish her farewell. She returns to her world slightly older, but right back in her groove.

== Development ==
Simogo had developed several narrative-based mobile games prior to Sayonara, including Year Walk and Device 6. According to studio lead Simon Flesser, they "wanted to make something that was a little more gut than brain", and began brainstorming ideas. An early idea was a sketch of a woman wearing a mask inspired by the teddy girl fad of the 1950s, which they grew out into an experience involving traveling through a dreamscape on motorcycles inspired by the tarot. They initially thought that the music for the game should be surf music, but as they were prototyping the game, they had a playlist of pop music on, which Flesser said immediately set the tone they wanted for the game; artists that inspired the soundtrack included Sia, Chvrches and Carly Rae Jepsen. The game's score was composed by Daniel Olsén and Jonathan Eng, with vocals by Linnea Olsson. While most of the compositions are original, the soundtrack also incorporates portions of Debussy's "Clair de lune" and "Rêverie".

Controls for the game were important to Simogo, as they had a general philosophy that their games could be played by those that did not normally play video games. They looked back to classic arcade games to consider their control schemes to come up with simple gameplay elements that only had the player manipulating the character with a joystick or through a touchscreen, and a single button press for certain actions, such as jumping or performing fighting moves. With the latter button mechanic, they found this allowed them to include the visual indicators on screen to help let players know the right time to perform these actions, enabling the various choreographed fighting sequences in some levels. Mechanics of some elements were pared down to keep interactions with movement and this button press as simple as possible.

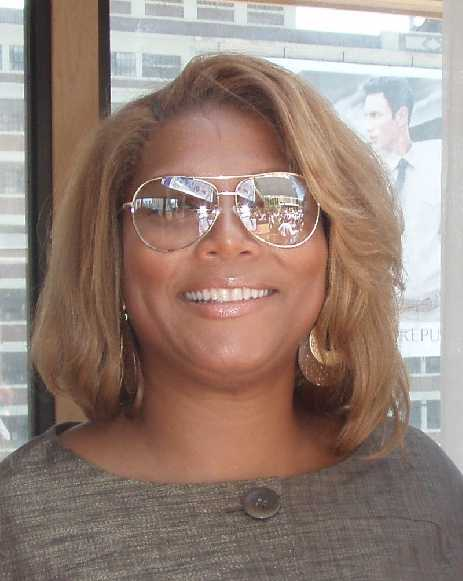
Queen Latifah was a last-minute addition as the game's narrator.

The levels represented a number of disparate ideas they had for the game. Simogo had not considered endless runners as a base, but instead looked to rail shooters such as Sin and Punishment, Space Harrier, and Star Fox which mixed both movement and shooting controls. Other games that inspired levels included WarioWare, Out Run and Osu! Tatakae! Ouendan. Initially the game had included some sections presented in third-person perspective allowing the character to walk around and solve puzzles, but found this slowed down the game. Similarly, mechanics that involved shooting targets in a specific order were also found detrimental to the pacing of the game. Many of the initial concepts were cut or reworked to maintain the simplicity of controls. Ultimately, they wanted the game to play out like a musical album with the songs and levels presented in a specific order to tell their story, but which could be replayed individually or out of order without detriment.

Development of the game took about four years starting in 2015. About midway through, Annapurna Interactive approached Simogo for publishing support, and with their funding, were able to hire two additional programmers to help complete the game's development. Flesser also noted that Annapurna brought some necessary rigor into the development cycle to keep them to schedule. As Simogo neared the end of production, Flesser had been in discussion with Annapurna about how they wished they had someone unexpected to narrate the brief lines they had for the story. When asked who they were thinking of, Flesser threw out Queen Latifah's name, not taking the request seriously. A few weeks later, within a month of release, Annapurna had been able to secure Queen Latifah for a voice recording session, to Flesser's surprise.

Sayonara Wild Hearts was first revealed at The Game Awards 2018 for the Nintendo Switch and other possible platforms. It was later affirmed both for release on the PlayStation 4, as well as a launch title for the Apple Arcade subscription service for macOS, tvOS and iOS devices, with the Switch, PlayStation 4, macOS, tvOS and iOS releases all on 19 September 2019. The game was released for Windows on 12 December 2019 and Xbox One on 25 February 2020. The game was released for the PlayStation 5 on 24 February 2025 during a showcase by Annapurna Interactive, with an exclusive mode titled "Remix Arcade".

A limited physical release of the game for both Nintendo Switch and PlayStation 4 was published by iam8bit in early 2020, alongside a double LP release of the soundtrack. A global physical release for the Switch and PlayStation 4 was released on 29 September 2020.

Since August 2024, the game is no longer available on Apple Arcade.

== Reception ==
Reception

Aggregate score
Aggregator	Score
Metacritic	iOS: 88/100; NS: 84/100; PS4: 84/100; XONE: 85/100

Review scores
Publication	Score
Destructoid	8/10
Edge	9/10
Eurogamer	Recommended
Game Informer	7/10
GameRevolution	4.5/5 stars
GameSpot	6/10
Hardcore Gamer	4.5/5
IGN	7.9/10
Nintendo Life	9/10 stars
Nintendo World Report	9/10
PCGamesN	9/10
Push Square	7/10 stars
TouchArcade	5/5 stars
USgamer	4/5
VideoGamer.com	9/10

Sayonara Wild Hearts received "generally favorable reviews" according to review aggregator Metacritic. The game was generally praised for its visuals and soundtrack.

The game's soundtrack was critically acclaimed. PlayStation Universe thought the soundtrack was "absolutely outstanding", and the best soundtrack of any game released in 2019. Edge thought that track "Mine" sounded like "a parallel-universe chart-topper", while "The World We Knew" "a gorgeous, swooning, sigh of a ballad." Rock Paper Shotgun wrote that the soundtrack was a large part of the game's appeal, "Sayonara's excellent soundtrack is a collection of swooping, pulsing pop songs that feel both modern and retro at the same time".

Eurogamer's Christian Donlan enjoyed the game's genre switches, saying "Sayonara Wild Hearts can change suits so often because the rules of the game remain constant". Jenna Stoeber of Polygon thought that Sayonara was "much more style than substance", but that the visuals and soundtrack were strong enough to justify a playthrough. The Washington Post praised the game's artstyle as a retro callback, writing, Sayonara Wild Hearts is a concentrated blast of audiovisual delight — its minimalist graphics evokes an era where wire-frame graphics and on-the-rail shooters were dazzling technology.

Nicole Clark of Vice thought that the ending of Sayonara was a departure from the usual hero's journey in a fictive narrative. "Rather than becoming your mask, you abandon it. Rather than becoming someone new and unbreakable you recover to the point of self-acceptance." Nintendo Life felt the game constantly managed to surprise the player throughout its runtime, "half the fun here is starting a new level... as you realise how the game's managed to transform its basic mechanic into yet another different style".

=== Accolades ===
In addition, several game magazines and websites named Sayonara Wild Hearts among their Games of the Year, including Eurogamer, Polygon, Edge, and Salon. Additionally, Edge gave Sayonara its Best Visual Design award and nominated the game for Best Audio Design in their 2019 awards. Sayonara also won "Apple Arcade Game of the Year" by Apple.

Award	Date	Category	Result	Ref.
Game Critics Awards	27 June 2019	Best Independent Game	Nominated	
Golden Joystick Awards	16 November 2019	Best Visual Design	Nominated	
Golden Joystick Awards	16 November 2019	Best Indie Game	Nominated	
Titanium Awards	9 December 2019	Best Soundtrack	Nominated	
The Game Awards	12 December 2019	Best Art Direction	Nominated	
The Game Awards	12 December 2019	Best Score / Music	Nominated	
The Game Awards	12 December 2019	Best Mobile Game	Nominated	
New York Game Awards	21 January 2020	A-Train Award for Best Mobile Game	Won	
New York Game Awards	21 January 2020	Off Broadway Award for Best Indie Game	Nominated	
New York Game Awards	21 January 2020	Tin Pan Alley Award for Best Music in a Game	Won	
Pocket Gamer Mobile Games Awards	21 January 2020	Game of the Year	Nominated	
Pocket Gamer Mobile Games Awards	21 January 2020	Best Audio/Visual Accomplishment	Nominated	
Guild of Music Supervisors Awards	6 February 2020	Best Music Supervision in a Video Game - Daniel Olsen	Nominated	
D.I.C.E. Awards	13 February 2020	Portable Game of the Year	Won	
D.I.C.E. Awards	13 February 2020	Outstanding Achievement for an Independent Game	Nominated	
D.I.C.E. Awards	13 February 2020	Outstanding Achievement in Audio Design	Nominated	
NAVGTR Awards	24 February 2020	Art Direction, Contemporary	Nominated	
NAVGTR Awards	24 February 2020	Camera Direction in a Game Engine	Nominated	
NAVGTR Awards	24 February 2020	Game, Music or Performance-Based	Nominated	
NAVGTR Awards	24 February 2020	Song Collection	Nominated	
Pégases Awards 2020	9 March 2020	Best International Mobile Game	Won	
Game Developers Choice Awards	18 March 2020	Best Audio	Nominated	
Game Developers Choice Awards	18 March 2020	Best Visual Art	Nominated	
Game Developers Choice Awards	18 March 2020	Best Mobile Game	Nominated	
SXSW Gaming Awards	24 March 2020	Mobile Game of the Year	Nominated	
SXSW Gaming Awards	24 March 2020	Excellence in Art	Nominated	
SXSW Gaming Awards	24 March 2020	Excellence in Musical Score	Nominated	
British Academy Games Awards	2 April 2020	Animation	Nominated	
British Academy Games Awards	2 April 2020	Artistic Achievement	Won	
Webby Awards	19 May 2020	Best Art Direction	Nominated	
Webby Awards	19 May 2020	Best Game Design	Won	
Webby Awards	19 May 2020	Best Music/Sound Design	Nominated	
Apple Design Awards	29 June 2020	Outstanding Design and Innovation	Won	
