= Andrew Prahlow =

American composer and musician

- Born: March 5, 1988 (age 38); Winter Park, Florida, U.S.
- Genres: Video game music, post-rock, ambient
- Occupation: Composer
- Years active: 2010–present
- Website: Official website

Andrew Prahlow (born March 5, 1988, in Winter Park, Florida) is an American video game, film, and television composer based in Los Angeles, California. He is a BAFTA-nominated composer. Prahlow is best known for his work on the action-adventure game Outer Wilds and its expansion, Outer Wilds: Echoes of the Eye. His music has been featured in many trailers, including Star Wars: The Force Awakens and The Martian. He also co-wrote music featured at Disney's Epcot and in Westworld. He began his career as a composer's assistant for Legend of Korra and Kung Fu Panda: Legends of Awesomeness.

In 2020, his Outer Wilds score was nominated for two G.A.N.G. Awards, Best Music for an Indie Game and Best Interactive Score.

In 2022, his score for Outer Wilds: Echoes of the Eye earned him a G.A.N.G. Award for Best Music for an Indie Game as well as two nominations, Best Main Theme and Creative and Technical Achievement in Music. The score also earned him a Music+Sound Award nomination for Best Original Composition in Gaming.

In August 2022, Prahlow released an expansion to Outer Wilds: Echoes of the Eye titled Outer Wilds: Echoes of the Eye (The Lost Reels).
