= Bumpy Road =

2011 video game

- App icon
- Developer: Simogo
- Publisher: Simogo
- Platforms: iOS, Mac
- Release: May 19, 2011
- Genre: Platform
- Mode: Single-player

Bumpy Road is a platforming video game developed and published by Simogo for iOS and Mac. The game employs a unique control scheme: the player moves the road under a car instead of the car itself to achieve the objectives of the game.

== Plot ==
The story begins at a cafe, where a waiter slips a girl a note asking her on a date. The two soon fall in love, buying a car and getting married. The couple has a baby, to whom they give their harmonica. The child grows up and meets a girl, whom he marries. He later goes off to war, where he presumably dies. His family mourns him, and eventually they give his four-year-old son his harmonica.

== Gameplay ==
In Bumpy Road, players navigate a car through an endless stage by tapping the ground, which creates hills and moves the car. Tapping below the car makes it jump, which can be used to jump on platforms and over water. Along the way, players have to pick up fuel in the form of small circular pellets to avoid stopping. Players can also collect pictures, which tell the story of the two main characters. The game has two modes. Evergreen Ride sees players going as far as they can without falling into water. In Sunday Trip, players drive through a level in an attempt to reach the finish line as fast as possible.

== Reception ==
Reception

Aggregate score
Aggregator	Score
Metacritic	86/100

Review score
Publication	Score
TouchArcade	5/5

The game has a Metacritic score of 86/100 based on 15 critic reviews.
