= Årsgång =

Archaic form of Swedish divination

Årsgång (pronounced [ˈoːʂgɔŋ]) is an archaic form of Swedish divination. It is sometimes translated as the year walk or yearly round.

According to Swedish researcher Tommy Kuusela, årsgång was a complex form of divination in Swedish folk tradition, usually practiced at Christmas or New Year’s Eve. The phenomenon could vary greatly regionally or even in the same district, but the general course was the same: if the practitioners ("year walkers") had managed to follow certain instructions and to solve particular challenges (such as encounters with supernatural beings), they would catch glimpses of what would happen the following year.

Petrus Gaslander's 18th-century Beskriftning om Svenska Allmogens Sinneslag och Seder… ("Character and Customs of the Peasantry") describes the årsgång, and says that it is no longer practiced. He writes that to undertake the årsgång, one must walk into a forest before first light on Christmas Eve, without looking at a fire and without food or drink, and walking so far that the crowing of a cock cannot be heard. Having done so, the "year walker" will now be able to see the events of the future, and by looking at fields and the roads approaching churches can learn of the harvests and funerals of the coming year.

== In popular culture ==
Årsgång was the basis for a 2013 adventure video game called Year Walk.
