= Beat Sneak Bandit =

2012 video game

- Developer: Simogo
- Publisher: Simogo
- Platform: iOS
- Release: February 16, 2012
- Genres: Music, stealth, puzzle
- Mode: Single-player

Beat Sneak Bandit is a 2012 music puzzle game developed and published by Simogo and released for iOS on February 16, 2012. The game has been met with critical acclaim.

== Plot ==
Beat Sneak Bandit and his sidekick Herbie is seen watching tv on their sofa, and are all relaxed until a breaking news headline appears on their tv.

The tv reporter says that all the clocks in the world has been stolen, and says that all evidence points to the Clockface mansion, home of Duke Clockface, the games antagonist.

Duke Clockface then denies all evidence, however the Bandit and Herbie easily sees through his lie, and starts collecting the clocks back.

They then manage to reach his mansion, and manages to trap him in his own machine.

== Reception ==
Reception

Aggregate score
Aggregator	Score
Metacritic	92/100

Review scores
Publication	Score
Edge	9/10
IGN	9/10
Pocket Gamer	4.5/5
TouchArcade	5/5
Slide to Play	Must Have

The game has a rating of 92/100 on Metacritic based on 19 critic reviews.

Multiple critics praised the game.

Other critics gave positive reviews.

Beat Sneak Bandit won Best Mobile Game at the 2012 Independent Games Festival.
