= Simogo =

Swedish video game developer

Simogo AB
- Type: Private
- Industry: Video games
- Founded: 2010
- Headquarters: Malmö, Sweden
- Products: Bumpy Road; Beat Sneak Bandit; Year Walk; Device 6 The Sailor's Dream; Sayonara Wild Hearts; Lorelei and the Laser Eyes
- Number of employees: 2 (as of 2026)
- Website: simogo.com

Simogo is a Swedish independent video game developer based in Malmö. The company was founded in 2010 and is best known for creating games for mobile devices, including Year Walk and Device 6. Its name comes from the name of its founders Simon (sim), and Gordon (go); the "o" from the Swedish word "och" meaning "and".

Prior to Simogo, founders Simon Flesser and Magnus "Gordon" Gardebäck worked at Southend Interactive, creating ilomilo amongst other games.

== History ==
In 2004, Simon Flesser was an animator for movies and commercials. With the release of the Nintendo DS in the same year, he became interested in developing games for the then-new platform. In 2007, he produced art for several Southend Interactive games.

While working at Southend Interactive, he met Magnus “Gordon” Gardebäck. In 2010, the duo decided to leave and establish their own company. Although their roles are not clearly defined, Flesser works on art, sound, and design, while Gardebäck programs and manages paperwork.

Before releasing a game, Simogo posts a visual collage teasing its inspirations. Hints are also visible throughout their blog, often hidden throughout seemingly normal announcements. After releasing their games, the company will usually provide insight into the development process as well as explain their previously cryptic clues.

Following the 2019 release of Sayonara Wild Hearts through Annapurna Interactive, Simogo and Annapurna announced they had reached a multi-year agreement for further publishing of Simogo's games.

== Games developed ==
Simogo is primarily a mobile game developer; as such, its games are usually first released for mobile products and then ported to other platforms such as PC and Mac.

=== Kosmo Spin (2010) ===
The new studio's first release was Kosmo Spin, where the player attempts to save a planet populated with breakfast cereal people from aliens. This game was made available on the App Store 2 December 2010 for USD $0.99. Reviewers praised the simplicity and "cute" graphics of the game. It was featured by Apple on the App Store following its release. Following the game's 5-year anniversary, the price of the game was raised to $2.99 in 2015.

=== Bumpy Road (2011) ===
Their next game was Bumpy Road, following the adventure of an old couple on a road trip. The distinguishing feature of this game was the mechanic where the player moves the road under the car instead of the car itself to reach objectives in the game. It was made available 19 May 2011 at a price of US$2.99 for iOS and 12 April 2012 at the same price for Mac. The game was featured on the front page of the Mac App Store when released.

=== Beat Sneak Bandit (2012) ===
Following the success of their previous games, they released their third, Beat Sneak Bandit. Playing as a bandit who must "sneak to the beat", the user sneaks into the mansion of "Duke Clockface" to take back the clocks the Duke has stolen from the town. It was made available 16 Feb 2012. Reviews praised the originality of the game, along with its design. The game was featured as the iPad Game of the Week. By January 2013, this game had sold 100,000 copies.

=== Year Walk (2013) ===
Their next game, Year Walk, departed from their style of happy, cute games. Year Walk is an adventure game about the Swedish tradition of "årsgång", or "year walking". It was released 21 Feb 2013 on the App Store for US$3.99, and PC and Mac on March 6, 2014. The game was met with overwhelmingly positive reception: reviewers praised the dark atmosphere, graphics, sound, and the story of the game. By 2014, it had sold over 200,000 copies. A version of the game for the Wii U console was released in 2015.

=== Device 6 (2013) ===
Device 6 is a text-based puzzle adventure game. The game is played from Player249's point of view as they guide a person named Anna through a strange island with no memory of getting there. Using clues hidden throughout the text and images, the player attempts to travel through the story. The app's text forms the map with which the player interacts; for example, a block of text moves as the player descends in an elevator. It was released on the App Store 17 October 2013 for iOS. Reception to this title was also overwhelmingly positive: reviewers lauded the creativity of the genre, the narrative, and the use of sound. By April 2014, it had sold 200,000 copies.

=== The Sailor's Dream (2014) ===
It was announced on 28 July 2014 that this game would be released in late 2014. It is, according to the game developers, 'more open and quite non-linear', unlike their previous titles. Several screencaps and a trailer of the game were provided with the announcement. Jonas Tarestad and Jonathan Eng, who previously worked with Simogo on Device 6, returned to work on this game. The Sailor's Dream was released on 6 November 2014.

=== SPL-T (2015) ===
SPL-T is a puzzle game for iOS which was released on 28 September 2015. The main goal of the game is 'splitting' blocks by tapping on them. The game is over when no more splits are possible.

=== Sayonara Wild Hearts (2019) ===
Sayonara Wild Hearts is a pop album video game released on 19 September 2019 for Nintendo Switch, PlayStation 4, and Apple devices via Apple Arcade and later for Microsoft Windows, and Xbox One. It was revealed at The Game Awards 2018. The game was created with support from Annapurna Interactive.

=== Lorelei and the Laser Eyes (2024) ===
Lorelei and the Laser Eyes is a murder mystery game released on 16 May 2024 for Nintendo Switch and Microsoft Windows, and on 3 December 2024 for PlayStation 4 and PlayStation 5. The game was published by Annapurna Interactive.

=== Simogo Legacy Collection (2025) ===
Simogo Legacy Collection is a video game collection released on 2 December 2025 for Nintendo Switch, Nintendo Switch 2, and Microsoft Windows, including seven games released on the App Store between 2010 and 2015, as well as bonus content from Simogo's history. Unlike their previous two releases, the collection is self-published.

== Reception and awards ==
While Bumpy Road and Kosmo Spin received positive reviews, earning aggregate scores of 86% and 83% on the review aggregator website Metacritic, Beat Sneak Bandit, Device 6 and Year Walk received even more praise, with scores of 92%, 92% and 87% respectively. Device 6, with a score of 92%, was in the top 100 games of all time at the time of its release. Sayonara Wild Hearts attained an aggregate score of 82–88% depending on platform. Lorelei and the Laser Eyes attained a score of 88–91% depending on platform.

=== Kosmo Spin ===
- Nordic Best Nordic Handheld Game Award 2011 (Nominated)
- Swedish Casual Mobile Game of the Year Award 2011 (Won)

=== Bumpy Road ===
- Pocket Gamer 2011: Silver Award

=== Beat Sneak Bandit ===
- BAFTA Games Awards 2013: Audio Achievement (Nominated)
- EDGE Award 2011: Best Audio Design (Won)
- IGF 2012: Best Mobile Game Award (Won)
- IndieCade 2012 (Nominated)
- Unity Awards 2012: Best Visual Experience (Nominated)
- Unity Awards 2012: Best Gameplay (Won)
- Rocket & Raygun Awards 2012: Best Mobile Puzzle Game (Won)

=== Year Walk ===
- BAFTA Games Awards 2014: Games Innovation (Nominated)
- IGF 2013: Excellence in Visual Art (Nominated)
- International Mobile Game Awards: Excellence in Art Design (Won)
- International Mobile Game Awards: Excellence in Storytelling (Nominated)
- Nordic Games Awards 2014: Best Nordic Handheld Game Award (Won)
- Nordic Games Awards 2014: Best Nordic Game (Nominated)
- Nordic Games Awards 2014: Best Nordic Innovation Award (Nominated)
- Pocket Gamer Top 10 iPhone Games of 2013
- Pocket Gamer 2014 Best Adventure Game Award (Honorable Mention)
- Pocket Gamer 2014 Best Role Playing Game Award (Honorable Mention)
- Swedish Game App of the Year Award 2014 (Won)
- TouchArcade Game of the Year Award 2013 (Runner-Up)
- Unity Awards 2013: Best 2D Visual Experience (Won)
- Unity Awards 2013: Community Choice (Finalist)
- Unity Awards 2013: Golden Cube (Finalist)

=== Device 6 ===
- Apple Design Awards 2014 (Won)
- BAFTA Games Awards 2014: Artistic Achievement (Nominated)
- BAFTA Games Awards 2014: Mobile and Handheld (Nominated)
- BAFTA Games Awards 2014: Audio Achievement (Nominated)
- Develop Awards 2014: Audio Accomplishment (Finalist)
- Develop Awards 2014: Use of Narrative (Finalist)
- Game Developers Choice 2014: Best Handheld/Mobile Game Award (Nominated)
- Game Developers Choice 2014: Innovation Award (Nominated)
- Global Mobile Awards 2014: Best Entertainment App (Won)
- IGF 2014: Excellence in Audio (Won)
- IGF 2014: Excellence in Visual Art (Finalist)
- IGF 2014: Excellence in Design (Honourable Mention)
- IGF 2014: Excellence in Narrative (Finalist)
- IGF 2014: Nuovo Award (Honourable Mention)
- IGF 2014: Seumas McNally Grand Prize (Finalist)
- International Mobile Game Awards: Excellence in Innovation (Nominated)
- International Mobile Game Awards: Excellence in Sound Design (Nominated)
- International Mobile Game Awards: Excellence in Storytelling (Nominated)
- Mobile Mavericks Awards 2013: Game of the Year (Won)
- Nordic Games 2014: Best Nordic Handheld Game (Nominated)
- Nordic Games 2014: Best Nordic Innovation Award (Won)
- Pocket Gamer 2014 Best App Ever Award (Won)
- Pocket Gamer 2014 Most Innovative Game Award (Won)
- Pocket Gamer 2014 Best Adventure Game Award (Honorable Mention)
- Pocket Tactics 2013: Word/Puzzle Game of the Year (Runner-Up)
- Swedish Game App of the Year Award 2014 (Nominated)

=== The Sailor's Dream ===
- BAFTA Games Awards 2015: Audio Achievement (Nominated)
- BAFTA Games Awards 2015: Music (Nominated)
- IGF 2015: Excellence in Audio (Finalist)
- Nordic Game 2015: Best Artistic Achievement (Nominated)
- Nordic Game 2015: Best Nordic Handheld Game (Nominated)
- App Store Editors' Choice (Runner-Up)

=== Sayonara Wild Hearts ===
- Apple Arcade Game of the Year 2019 (Won)
- Apple Design Award 2020 (Won)
- Game Critics Awards 2019: Best Independent Game (Nominated)
- Golden Joystick Awards 2019: Best Visual Design (Nominated)
- Golden Joystick Awards 2019: Best Indie Game (Nominated)
- Titanium Awards 2019: Best Soundtrack (Jonathan Eng) (Nominated)
- The Game Awards 2019: Best Art Direction (Nominated)
- The Game Awards 2019: Best Score/Music (Nominated)
- The Game Awards 2019: Best Mobile Game (Nominated)
- New York Game Awards 2020: A-Train Award for Best Mobile Game (Won)
- New York Game Awards 2020: Off Broadway Award for Best Indie Game (Nominated)
- New York Game Awards 2020: Tin Pan Alley Award for Best Music in a Game (Won)
- 23rd Annual D.I.C.E. Awards: Portable Game of the Year (Won)
- 23rd Annual D.I.C.E. Awards: Outstanding Achievement for an Independent Game (Nominated)
- 23rd Annual D.I.C.E. Awards: Outstanding Achievement in Audio Design (Nominated)
- 20th Game Developers Choice Awards: Best Audio (Nominated)
- 20th Game Developers Choice Awards: Best Visual Art (Nominated)
- 20th Game Developers Choice Awards: Best Mobile Game (Nominated)
- BAFTA Games Awards 2020: Artistic Achievement (Won)
- BAFTA Games Awards 2020: Animation (Nominated)
- Pocket Gamer Awards 2019: Game of the Year (Nominated)
- Pocket Gamer Awards 2019: Best Audio/Visual Accomplishment (Nominated)
- Guild of Music Supervisors Awards: Best Music Supervision in a Video Game (Daniel Olsén) (Nominated)
- NAVGTR Awards 2019: Contemporary Art Direction (Nominated)
- NAVGTR Awards 2019: Camera Direction in a Game Engine (Nominated)
- NAVGTR Awards 2019: Music or Performance-Based Game (Nominated)
- NAVGTR Awards 2019: Song Collection (Nominated)
- Pégases Awards 2020: Best International Mobile Game (Won)
- SXSW Gaming Awards 2020: Mobile Game of the Year (Nominated)
- SXSW Gaming Awards 2020: Excellence in Art (Nominated)
- SXSW Gaming Awards 2020: Excellence in Musical Score (Nominated)

=== Lorelei and the Laser Eyes ===
- DIGY awards 2025: Most Innovative (Won)
- Thinky Awards 2024: Game of the Year (Won)
- Thinky Awards 2024: Best Presentation (Won)
- Thinky Awards 2024: Best Aha Moment (Nominated)
- The Nordic Game Awards 2025: Best Game Design (Won)
- The Game Awards 2024: Best Independent games (Nominated)
- Golden Joystick Awards 2024: Best Storytelling (Nominated)
- Golden Joystick Awards 2024: Best Indie Game (Nominated)
- The EDGE Awards 2024: Game of the Year (3rd place)
- 28th Annual D.I.C.E. Awards: Outstanding Achievement in Game Direction (Finalist)
- Game Developers Choice Awards 2025: Best Design (Nominated)
- Game Developers Choice Awards 2025: Innovation Award (Honorable Mention)
- Game Developers Choice Awards 2025: Best Audio (Honorable Mention)
- The Hugo Awards 2025: Best Game or Interactive Work (Finalist)
