= 2019 in esports =

List of esports events in 2019 (also known as professional gaming).

== Calendar of events ==
=== Tournaments ===
Date	Game	Event	Location	Winner(s)
January 9 – 13	Dota 2	The Bucharest Minor	PGL Studios − Bucharest, Romania	EHOME
January 10 – 12	PlayerUnknown's Battlegrounds	PUBG Asia Invitational 2019	Cotai Arena − Macau, China	Actoz Starz Red
January 19 – 27	Dota 2	The Chongqing Major	Bloomage Culture and Sports Center − Chongqing, China	Team Secret
January 25 – 27	Counter-Strike: Global Offensive	ELEAGUE CS:GO Invitational 2019	ELEAGUE Arena − Atlanta, United States	FaZe Clan
February 1 – 3	Super Smash Bros. Ultimate; Super Smash Bros. Melee; Super Smash Bros.	Genesis 6	Oakland Convention Center and Paramount Theatre − Oakland, United States	MKLeo (SSBU); Hungrybox (SSBM) k y s k (SSB)
February 4 – July 6	Call of Duty: Black Ops 4	2019 CWL Pro League	Nationwide Arena − Columbus, United States	eUnited
February 11 – 17	Rainbow Six Siege	Six Invitational 2019	Place Bell − Laval, Canada	G2 Esports
February 13 – March 3	Counter-Strike: Global Offensive; StarCraft II	Intel Extreme Masters Season XIII – World Championship	Spodek − Katowice, Poland	Astralis (CS:GO); Dignitas (female CS:GO) soO (StarCraft II)
February 15 – 17	various fighting games	Evo Japan 2019	Fukuoka Kokusai Center − Fukuoka, Japan	See main article
February 22 – 24	Dota 2	ESL One Katowice 2019	Spodek − Katowice, Poland	Team Secret
March 1 – 3	Fortnite	ESL Katowice Royale	Spodek − Katowice, Poland	Vinny1x
March 7 – 10	Dota 2	StarLadder ImbaTV Dota 2 Minor Season 1	Cybersport Arena − Kyiv, Ukraine	Vici Gaming
March 14 – 24	Dota 2	DreamLeague Season 11	Annexet − Stockholm, Sweden	Vici Gaming
March 15–17	Call of Duty: Black Ops 4	CWL Fort Worth	Fort Worth Convention Center − Texas, United States	Luminosity Gaming
March 22 – 23	Counter-Strike: Global Offensive	BLAST Pro Series São Paulo 2019	Ginásio do Ibirapuera − São Paulo, Brazil	Astralis
March 30 – April 7	Counter-Strike: Global Offensive	StarSeries i-League CS:GO Season 7	Baoshan Sport Center − Shanghai, China	Natus Vincere
April 12 – 13	Counter-Strike: Global Offensive	BLAST Pro Series Miami 2019	Watsco Center − Coral Gables, United States	FaZe Clan
April 16 – 21	Dota 2	ESL One Mumbai	Sardar Vallabhbhai Patel Indoor Stadium − Mumbai, India	Keen Gaming
April 16 – 21	PlayerUnknown's Battlegrounds	FACEIT Global Summit: PUBG Classic	ExCeL − London, United Kingdom	OP Gaming
April 22 – 28	Dota 2	OGA Dota Pit Minor	Spaladium Arena − Split, Croatia	Ninjas in Pyjamas
April 25 – 28	Hearthstone	2019 HCT World Championship	Heping Basketball Gymnasium − Taipei, Taiwan	Hunterace
May 1–19	League of Legends	2019 Mid-Season Invitational	VCS Studio − Ho Chi Minh City, Vietnam (play-in stage) Vietnam National Convention Center - Hanoi, Vietnam (group stage) Heping Basketball Gymnasium − Taipei, Taiwan (playoffs)	G2 Esports
May 3–5	Call of Duty: Black Ops 4	CWL London	Copper Box Arena − London, United Kingdom	100 Thieves
May 4 – 12	Dota 2	MDL Disneyland Paris Major	Disneyland Paris − Paris, France	Team Secret
June 12 – 16	Dota 2	StarLadder ImbaTV Dota 2 Minor Season 2	Cybersport Arena − Kyiv, Ukraine	Ninjas in Pyjamas
June 14–16	Call of Duty: Black Ops 4	CWL Anaheim	Anaheim Convention Center − California, United States	100 Thieves
June 19 – 23	Mobile Legends: Bang Bang	Mobile Legends: Bang Bang Southeast Asia Cup (MSC) 2019	Smart Araneta Coliseum − Manila, Philippines	Onic Esports
June 22 – 30	Dota 2	Epicenter Major	VEB Arena − Moscow, Russia	Vici Gaming
June 26 – 28	Fortnite	2019 Fortnite World Cup Finals	Arthur Ashe Stadium − New York City, United States	Bugha (solo); Aqua & Nyhrox (duo)
June 27 - July 14	Arena of Valor	Arena of Valor World Cup	Tiên Sơn Sports Complex - Đà Nẵng, Vietnam	Team Vietnam
July 18–21	Counter-Strike: Global Offensive	Intel Extreme Masters Season XIV - Chicago	United Centre − Chicago, United States	Team Liquid
August 2 – 4	various fighting games	Evo 2019	Mandalay Bay − Las Vegas, United States	Various
August 09–11	PlayerUnknown's Battlegrounds	PUBG Nations Cup - Seoul 2019	Jangchung Arena − Seoul, South Korea	Russia
August 12–18	Rainbow Six Siege	Six Major Raleigh	Raleigh Convention Center − Raleigh, United States	Team Empire
August 14–18	Call of Duty: Black Ops 4	2019 Call of Duty Championship	Pauley Pavilion − Los Angeles, United States	eUnited
August 16 – 18	Hearthstone	Masters Tour 2019 Seoul	OGN Studios − Seoul, South Korea	Felkeine
August 20 – 25	Dota 2	The International 2019	Mercedes-Benz Arena − Shanghai, China	OG
August 23–28	Counter-Strike: Global Offensive	Starladder Berlin Major 2019	Mercedes-Benz Arena − Berlin, Germany	Astralis
September 29	Overwatch	2019 Overwatch League Grand Finals	Wells Fargo Center − Philadelphia, United States	San Francisco Shock
September 26–29	Counter Strike: Global Offensive	ESL One: New York 2019	Barclays Centre New York, United States	Evil Geniuses
October 1 – 6	Counter Strike: Global Offensive	DreamHack Masters Malmö 2019	MalmöMässan (group stage) and Malmö Arena (playoffs) Malmö, Sweden	Fnatic
October 2 - November 10	League of Legends	2019 League of Legends World Championship	LEC Studio - Berlin, Germany (play-in stage) Verti Music Hall - Berlin, Germany (group stage) Palacio Vistalegre - Madrid, Spain (quarter- and semi-finals) AccorHotels Arena - Paris, France (final)	FunPlus Phoenix
October 28	Virtual Regatta - Inshore	eSailing World Championship Final	Fairmont Southampton Hotel, Bermuda	Velista71 (ITA)
November 1 – 2	Overwatch	2019 Overwatch World Cup	Anaheim Convention Center − Anaheim, United States	United States
November 2	Soulcalibur VI	Soulcalibur World Invitational 2019	ESports Arena Las Vegas − Las Vegas, United States	Skyll
November 5–24	Arena of Valor	Arena of Valor International Championship	Garena Esports Studio - Bangkok, Thailand (group stage & Quarter-finals) ICONSIAM (semi-finals and Grand Finals)	Team Flash (Vietnam)
November 7 – 10	Counter Strike: Global Offensive	Intel Extreme Masters Season XIV - Beijing	Beijing University Students Stadium- Beijing, China	Astralis
November 8 – 24	PlayerUnknown's Battlegrounds	PUBG Global Championship 2019	Oakland Arena — Oakland, USA	Gen.G
November 15–17	Mobile Legends: Bang Bang	Mobile Legends: Bang Bang World Championship (M1) 2019	Axiata Arena − Kuala Lumpur, Malaysia	EVOS Legends
November 29 - December 1	Counter Strike: Global Offensive	DreamHack Open Winter 2019	Elmia Convention Centre − Jönköping, Sweden	forZe
December 7	Clash Royale	Clash Royale League World Finals 2019	Shrine Auditorium and Expo Hall − Los Angeles, United States	Team Liquid
December 3 – 8	Counter Strike: Global Offensive	ESL Pro League Season 10: Finals	Odense Congress Centre (group stage) and Jyske Bank Arena (playoffs) - Odense, Denmark	mousesports
December 6 – 8	Counter Strike: Global Offensive	DreamHack Deli Invitational 2019	NSIC Exhibition Ground − New Delhi, India	pro100
December 7 – 8	Tekken 7	2019 Tekken World Tour Finals	KBank Siam Pic-Ganesha − Bangkok, Thailand	Chikurin
December 12 – 14	Counter Strike: Global Offensive	Blast Pro Series: Global Final 2019	ISA Sports City − Riffa, Bahrain	Astralis
December 13 – 15	Counter Strike: Global Offensive	cs_summit 5	Summit Studios − Los Angeles, United States	mousesports
December 13 – 15	Street Fighter V	Capcom Cup 2019	The Novo by Microsoft − Los Angeles, United States	Idom
December 13 – 15	Counter Strike: Global Offensive	DreamHack Open Sevilla 2019	FIBES − Sevilla, Spain	North
December 17 – 22	Counter Strike: Global Offensive	EPICENTER 2019	Crocus Expo Hall − Moscow, Russia	Team Vitality
