= Outer Wilds =

2019 video game

- Developer: Mobius Digital
- Publisher: Annapurna Interactive
- Director: Alex Beachum
- Producers: Masi Oka; Loan Verneau
- Designers: Alex Beachum; Loan Verneau
- Programmers: Logan ver Hoef; Jeffrey Yu
- Artist: Wesley Martin
- Writer: Kelsey Beachum
- Composer: Andrew Prahlow
- Platforms: Windows; Xbox One; PlayStation 4; PlayStation 5; Xbox Series X/S; Nintendo Switch
- Release: May 28, 2019: Windows, Xbox One; May 28, 2019; PS4; October 15, 2019; PS5, Xbox Series X/S; September 15, 2022; Nintendo Switch; December 7, 2023
- Genre: Action-adventure
- Mode: Single-player

Outer Wilds is a 2019 action-adventure game developed by Mobius Digital and published by Annapurna Interactive. The game follows the player character as they explore a planetary system stuck in a 22-minute time loop that resets after the sun goes supernova and destroys the system. Through repeated attempts, they investigate the alien ruins of the Nomai to discover their history and the cause of the time loop.

The game began development in 2012 as director Alex Beachum's master's thesis. He was inspired to create a game focused on exploration in which the player character was not the center of the game world. Beachum led a small team in building the game, first as an independent project, then as a commercial game at Mobius after the project won the Excellence in Design and Seumas McNally Grand Prize awards at the 2015 Independent Games Festival. Annapurna joined the project as the publisher in 2015 and funded its expansion beyond a student project.

Outer Wilds was released for Windows, Xbox One, and PlayStation 4 in 2019, for PlayStation 5 and Xbox Series X/S in 2022, and for Nintendo Switch in 2023. An expansion which explores further themes in a new location in the planetary system, Echoes of the Eye, was begun in 2019 and released for the same platforms in 2021. Outer Wilds was positively received upon release, with most critics acclaiming its design and some criticizing the uneven difficulty of gameplay and pursuing the game's mysteries. Echoes of the Eye was also positively received, with some criticism for its introduction of horror elements. Outer Wilds was featured in several game of the year lists for 2019 as well as game of the decade and game of the era lists, won in multiple categories at award shows, including the Best Game award at the 16th British Academy Games Awards, and is regarded as one of the greatest video games ever made.

== Gameplay ==
The Hatchling in their spacesuit on one of the Hourglass Twins, with the fuel and oxygen gauges visible. Nomai writing is being read by the translator tool, with unread writing in blue. The Sun, the spaceship, Brittle Hollow and its moon Hollow's Lantern are visible in the background.

Outer Wilds is an action-adventure game set in a small planetary system in which the player character, an unnamed space explorer referred to as "hatchling", explores and investigates its mysteries in a self-directed manner. Whenever the Hatchling dies, the game resets to the beginning; this happens regardless after 22 minutes of gameplay due to the star going supernova. The player uses these repeated time loops to discover the secrets of the Nomai, an alien species that has left ruins scattered throughout the planetary system, including why the star is exploding. A downloadable content expansion, Echoes of the Eye, adds additional locations and mysteries to the game.

The Hatchling moves around the game space by walking and jumping; if they are wearing their spacesuit they may also use its jetpack to propel themselves upwards. The spacesuit has a limited supply of fuel, which can be refilled at specific locations, and a limited supply of oxygen, which is refilled when the Hatchling is near trees. If the Hatchling runs out of fuel, they can use oxygen as a propellant. Running out of oxygen, hitting an object or surface too hard, or being crushed will injure the Hatchling or damage their suit, killing them if too much injury is sustained. While wearing the spacesuit, an interface showing the remaining fuel and oxygen is shown. Damage to the Hatchling is shown by their suit icon turning red, with no explicit health amount given. The Hatchling also has a signalscope, which can be used to scan for the source of audio transmissions.

The Hatchling can also freely fly a small spacecraft throughout the planetary system. The spacecraft and the celestial bodies of the system follow an exaggerated system of Newtonian physics, causing the planets and other bodies to swiftly orbit the sun and exert their own variable gravity fields, and requiring the player to counteract their own momentum to slow down while flying. Collisions can damage parts of the spacecraft and make them inoperable; too much damage can destroy it and kill the Hatchling, but can otherwise be repaired by exiting the spacecraft and interacting with the damaged component. Both the spacecraft and the spacesuit can launch a small probe to light up an area or take pictures.

The player character can only carry a single object at a time. Nothing is brought back with the Hatchling when the time loop resets, with the exception of the data on the spacecraft's computer, which displays the information and mysteries that the player has found so far, organized either by location or in a web of connections. Locations evolve throughout the duration of the time loop, such as parts of a planet collapsing or sand flowing from one area to another, making some areas only accessible from specific points in the time loop. Other people throughout the planetary system can be communicated with in text-based dialogue trees, while Nomai writing, found in their ruins and presented as a branching tree of messages, can be read with a translator tool.

== Plot ==
The map of the planetary system that can be seen in the Hatchling's ship

=== Setting ===
Outer Wilds is set in a planetary system consisting of a star orbited by a number of celestial bodies: the Hourglass Twins, a pair of planets orbiting each other with sand flowing from one to the other; Timber Hearth, a forested Earth-like planet that is the homeworld of the four-eyed Hearthian species; the Attlerock, a small rocky moon orbiting Timber Hearth; Brittle Hollow, a hollow planet that is collapsing into a black hole at its center and is orbited by Hollow's Lantern, a volcanic moon; Giant's Deep, a cloud-covered water planet containing several floating islands; and Dark Bramble, a shattered planet largely composed of a space-warping vine plant, inhabited by giant, aggressive anglerfish. Each planet has a distinct visual identity, such as Timber Hearth resembling a campsite in the woods with browns and greens, while Giant's Deep has blue-green ocean with rocky islands. Each planet has a distinct auditory identity as well, with a member of the Outer Wilds space exploration program playing the same song on a unique instrument, which can be listened to from anywhere in the solar system with the signalscope. Additionally, there is the Quantum Moon, which moves to orbit different planets when not observed; the Interloper, an icy comet; and space stations orbiting the sun and Giant's Deep left by the Nomai, a race that went extinct in the planetary system long before the game begins. Hearthians are a four-eyed species that resemble aquatic animals with legs, while the Nomai are a three-eyed, fur-covered, antlered species that wear robes and large masks.

=== Story ===
The player takes the role of an unnamed Hearthian space explorer, referred to as "hatchling" by other Hearthians, preparing for their first space flight as part of Outer Wilds Ventures. They are to be the first explorer to travel with a Nomai text translator tool. Prior to departure, a Nomai statue in a museum activates and turns towards them. The player discovers that whenever the Hatchling dies, a vision of a Nomai mask appears, and they are sent back in time to the start of the game in a time loop. Additionally, the loop resets after 22 minutes regardless, as the sun abruptly goes supernova, destroying the solar system.

The player, through repeated time loops, explores the planetary system and the ruins that the Nomai left behind. From their writings, the Nomai were a nomadic species that explored the universe in large spaceships called Vessels; one Vessel discovered a signal older than the universe emanating from the Hatchling's star system. Upon warping to the system, the Vessel became embedded in Dark Bramble, with some of the Nomai surviving in escape pods. No longer able to detect the signal, the Nomai built a civilization throughout the system while trying to find the source, dubbed the "Eye of the Universe". They eventually discover that, with enough power, they can send objects or information backwards in time using a linked pair of black and white holes. This inspires them to build a probe cannon in orbit around Giant's Deep to fire a probe in a random direction to locate the Eye, and a station in orbit around the star, the Sun Station, that would artificially induce a supernova, generating enough power to send the probe's data back in time 22 minutes. Together, this would allow the probe to be fired in as many times and directions as necessary to find the Eye, at which point the Nomai would shut down the Sun Station, ending the time loop. However, the Sun Station failed to induce a supernova and before an alternate power source could be found, the Interloper entered the solar system. The Nomai investigating found that the Interloper contained an extremely pressurized source of "ghost matter", a highly lethal and invisible substance. Before they could inform the others, the source ruptured and a powerful wave of ghost matter spread throughout the system, killing all of the Nomai.

A long time later, after the animals of Timber Hearth evolved into the Hearthians, the sun goes supernova as part of the natural end of the universe, triggering the time loop repeatedly until the probe cannon finds the Eye at the beginning of the game and through the statue inducts the Hatchling into the loop. Armed with this knowledge, the Hatchling is able to repower the Vessel and warp to the Eye. Upon entering the Eye, the Hatchling encounters echoes of the other members of Outer Wilds, as well as a Nomai if they had met on the Quantum Moon. As the universe ends the Eye creates a new universe in a Big Bang. The ending shows a similar planetary system with new life forms 14.3 billion years after its creation, with influences of the Hearthians and Nomai.

=== Echoes of the Eye ===
The Echoes of the Eye expansion adds an exhibit to the museum at the beginning of the game, which shows off the deep space satellite used to generate the player's system map. The player discovers an object that eclipses the star—a planet-sized rotating ship, hidden within a cloaking field. Within this ship, called the Stranger, the player finds an abandoned village by a circular river, containing heavily damaged slide reels that can be projected to tell the story of the Stranger's inhabitants.

Similar to the Nomai, the unnamed species that built the Stranger also came to the Hearthian system after discovering the Eye of the Universe's signals, forming a religion around it and ravaging their homeworld moon to build the Stranger. Upon reaching the system and discovering that the Eye heralded the end of the universe, they destroyed their monuments to the Eye and constructed a device to block its signal from other races. The inhabitants built a virtual reality of their homeworld, which could be entered using lantern-like devices and in which they could remain after death. The player discovers their corpses, still holding the lanterns, as well as one inhabitant, the Prisoner, who is locked away from the others both in reality and in the virtual world.

The player learns how to enter the simulation via the lanterns and discovers the active consciousnesses of the inhabitants, who are hostile to the player. The Prisoner's vault, however, cannot be entered. After discovering slide reels showing the limitations of the virtual reality system, the player uses glitches in the system to unlock the vault's three seals and open it. Communicating with the player via a telepathic projection staff, the Prisoner transmits a memory of their crime, which was to disable the signal blocker surrounding the Eye temporarily before they were imprisoned. The player uses the staff to explain to the Prisoner how their actions led the Nomai to discover the signal of the Eye and enter the system, setting the events of the game in motion. The Prisoner exits the vault and vanishes, leaving footprints leading into a nearby lake and their staff on the shore, which shows the player a vision of the Prisoner riding into the sunrise on a raft, accompanied by the player. If the player travels to the Eye of the Universe after having met with the Prisoner, they will find an echo of the Prisoner alongside the other characters, and the ending scene has an influence from the Stranger's inhabitants.

== Development and release ==
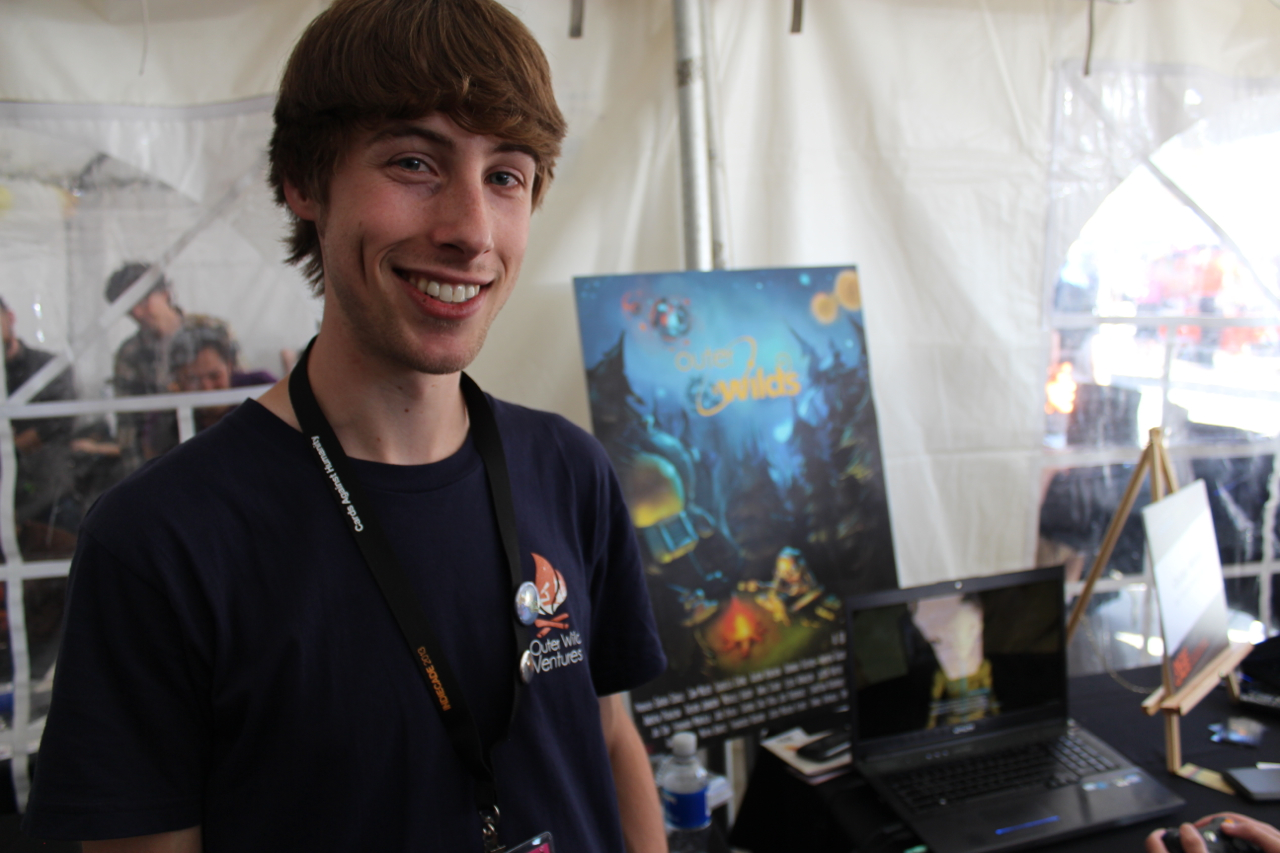
Game director Alex Beachum in 2013

The development of Outer Wilds began in late 2012 as Alex Beachum's thesis for his master's degree at USC Interactive Media & Games Division. Beachum was the creative director for the project, which he developed along with 30 other developers, including students from USC and student artists from Laguna College of Art and Design and Atlantic University College. Beachum reused elements from previous projects at the school, including a planetary system changing over time, a planet falling apart, and trees that moved when they were not observed. His goal was a game where the player would engage in space exploration in an open system that changed over time, with the primary goal being the exploration itself rather than traditional gameplay elements like resources or conquering. The game universe was designed to not be centered on the player, in that it continued to change whether or not the player was present or performing actions and the player was not the "chosen one" of the narrative. He was inspired by the "spirit of space exploration" in an uncontrollable environment in the films Apollo 13 (1995) and 2001: A Space Odyssey (1968), and took cues from The Legend of Zelda: The Wind Waker's (2002) non-player characters that would tell tales of distant lands to entice the player to explore those areas for themselves, and the sense of impending doom of The Legend of Zelda: Majora's Mask.

Initially unsure of where to start, he was encouraged by a fellow student to make an "emotional prototype" of the game he wanted to make; the result was a short sequence of the player roasting a marshmallow over a campfire while the sun explodes above them. Beachum kept this as the core of the game thereafter, representing the theme of the differences in scale between forces outside the player character's control and the small moments they could focus on instead. At the conclusion of his thesis, the game had the core gameplay mechanics of the player exploring a planetary system until the sun explodes and resets the time loop, along with the central puzzle of the time loop itself and the planets that were included in the final game.

After graduating in May 2013, Beachum worked for a time at Microsoft, and in March 2014 took a job at Mobius Digital, founded in 2013 by his classmate Loan Verneau, who had worked on the Outer Wilds project, and actor Masi Oka. Several other members of the development team were hired by Mobius as well, as Oka had seen the game at a USC exhibition and was impressed by their work. There, they worked on mobile games, while continuing to work on Outer Wilds as a side project. Beachum also made a text adventure version of the game to prototype the story and mystery aspect of the game, which he publicly released in 2024. The team submitted Outer Wilds, which had implemented some but not all of the narrative elements of the text prototype, to the 2015 Independent Games Festival, where it won the Excellence in Design and Seumas McNally Grand Prize awards and received honorable mention for the Excellence in Narrative and Nuovo Award categories.

In response to its positive reception, Mobius took the game on as a development project, with the aim of spending a year polishing it into a commercial game for Windows. Mobius launched a crowdfunding campaign for the game on Fig, after being invited to be the platform's first game, raising US$125,000. Beachum continued as creative director for the game, with Verneau as a designer, Logan Ver Hoef and Jeffrey Yu as programmers, and Beachum's sister Kelsey as writer. Mobius additionally hired art director Wesley Martin, who had initially seen the game at IGF. During this second phase of development, the team focused on creating a unified art style for the game and refining the design, but due to the time and budget constraints did not try to expand the game's size or increase the visual quality beyond the IGF version. Mobius later stated in 2024 that they did not expect that the game would reach a wide audience and would likely result in the closure of the studio, but that it could not afford to create a more complete and polished game.

During that year of development, Annapurna Interactive approached the studio to be the publisher, buying out the investment and rights from Fig. The original investors in the game received a 245% return on their investment. Annapurna, in turn, pushed for the game to be more than a polished student project, and the development timeline was extended, delaying the planned launch from 2016 to 2018. This was later delayed to 2019, with the game also planned for release on the Xbox One. Mobius began work with Section Studios, a video game art company, to develop concept art for the revamped game. The two companies went through several iterations of design prototypes, while Mobius built development tools, before they aligned on a coherent aesthetic and Mobius built a vertical slice of Giants Deep for Annapurna. Mobius then hired an in-house art team and built the rest of the game as the last phase of development. This was largely due the difficulty of explaining to new contractors the design constraints of having the game world made up of moving, explorable spheres, which prevented many common game art techniques and forced several uncommon programming and development restrictions.

Outer Wilds was released digitally on PC and Xbox One on May 28, 2019. In exchange for additional financial support, the game was initially a timed exclusive on the Epic Games Store, delaying support for a Linux version. A PlayStation 4 version was released on October 15, 2019, a PlayStation 5 and Xbox Series X and Series S version on September 15, 2022, and a Nintendo Switch version on December 7, 2023. A physical PlayStation 4 version was released by Limited Run Games in 2020, and physical PlayStation 5 and Switch versions were released as part of collectors editions by iam8bit and Happinet in 2024. Two books with concept art and developer interviews, Field Guide to the Outer Wilds and Outer Wilds: Design Works, were released in 2024 and 2025.

=== Design ===
The game heavily employs a camping motif, reflecting Beachum's personal interest in backpacking while also emphasizing that the player character is far from their home and alone in space. Martin combined this with his childhood in the Santa Cruz mountains to make a visual design for Timber Hearth of a redwood forest, which was expanded to give many of the planets designs based on specific areas. Timber Hearth is based on Yellowstone National Park, Sequoia National Park, and Mount Rainier; Brittle Hollow is based on Iceland and Greenland; and Giant's Deep is loosely based on Santa Cruz beach cliffs. The Outer Wilds space program aesthetic follows a design of "camping in space", and combines a rustic camping site with the aesthetic of NASA in the 1960s and 1970s. To help direct players, the art design is not uniformly detailed, with less detail present where there is nothing to find. This is intended to train players to not exhaustively check every area, in order to steer them towards the paths the team wanted them to find first and not hidden shortcuts or empty areas.

The writing of the game was designed by Kelsey Beachum to take the player on the same journey that the Nomai had taken, with the branching writing intended to feel like a conversation and based on her own note-taking style. As the player's journey is self-guided, they are not forced to read any of the writing at a specific time or order, so the writing is designed to interest the player and let them take in information at their own pace. It is constructed to be a major part of the gameplay loop, as learning new things is the only feedback the player gets. To that end, it is composed of a set of smaller mysteries, which each encourage exploration to solve and reward the player with new knowledge more often than fewer, larger mysteries would. In order to incentivize players to read the text, Beachum wrote conversations between strongly defined personalities, and made sure that conversations would not contain only background "lore" unrelated to the game's mystery so that players would expect that it was all valuable, important content that should not be skipped. As players could find writings out of linear order, each conversation needed to hint to the player where previous conversations could be found, as well as what the Nomai writers planned to do next and where.

=== Music ===
The music of the game was composed by Andrew Prahlow, who had worked with Beachum previously. The central motif was based on sitting around a campfire, coming from Beachum's emotional core of the game. Prahlow joined the project in 2012 and began with a simple melody on a banjo as a "campfire song", and expanded the music from there. He gave each of the other Outer Wilds explorers an instrument based on their personality, with the concept that they were all playing the same song apart but still together. This can be heard in-game with the signalscope when the five planets with Outer Wilds members are lined up. The Nomai were given piano and synthesizers as a technological counterpoint to the more woodsy Hearthians, with sound effects in their ruins that corresponded to indicate how the Nomai expressed themselves through technology.

The music was written alongside the game's story, allowing it to grow and change as the story was refined, resulting in a unified theme about the joy of life and its bittersweet journey. Prahlow did not write general background music, so that music would only play when the player was in a location where it would be noticeable and meaningful. The title theme was both the first and last song written, as Prahlow recorded himself playing banjo music at the beginning of development and again at the very end to symbolize the growth and change over the course of the game's creation. A soundtrack album for the game, Outer Wilds, was released on June 1, 2019, with a vinyl version, Signals From The Outer Wilds, released in 2020.

=== Echoes of the Eye ===
Mobius began working on the Echoes of the Eye expansion shortly before finishing the original game. The team quickly came up with the central concept for the story: that another race, acting as a foil to the Nomai, had reached the Eye of the Universe first and, afraid of what they had found, blocked the signal. This necessitated making a small change to the base game before it was released, to ensure that the Nomai did not report detecting the signal at all once they warped into the system. When developing the base game, the team had created the concepts of the planets before writing the story, but in Echoes they did the opposite, designing the game world around the story. The initial concept to tie into the game's camping motif was that of a ghost story told around a campfire. They came up with a central motif of light and darkness, with the truth hidden in the darkness waiting to be found, but might be scary or unpleasant. This in turn meant that Echoes would be more of a horror game, with more frightening elements; the original summary pitch to Annapurna was exploring ancient alien ruins only to discover that the aliens were still haunting them.

The original fundraising campaign for Outer Wilds had included an invisible planet as a stretch goal, and in Echoes the team revised the concept into an invisible artificial structure. The structure was originally going to be a flat circle or "coin" of swampland with one side light and the other side dark, with the aliens in a computer world while their ghosts wandered the dark side of the coin. The player would traverse the coin with a raft, occasionally chased by a water monster. After initial prototyping, the coin world was scrapped in favor of the ringworld of the final version, with the raft retained but the water monster replaced with the dam breaking. The swampland of the coin, initially chosen as an unused national park-esque setting, was relegated to the dreamworld, while the ringworld was given a white water rafting theme. The ending of the story also changed during development: originally, the Prisoner would be met early in the story, and they and the player would unhide the eye of the universe at the end and journey there. This was removed after Beachum and Verneau decided that they did not want Echoes to change the game path of the original game. The elements of "breaking" the simulation were added to replace finding the combinations to the three seals on the Prisoner's cage, as the designers could not justify why the aliens would have kept the codes to the locks written down when they never intended to open the cage and had destroyed so much else.

The slide reels were added to the game to tell the story visually because the player character could not understand the alien language, and in turn those visuals needed to be both linear and under the player's control so that it would be clearly understandable. The art direction for the ringworld combined Pacific Northwest Native American, Louisiana swamp, and Egyptian elements. Unlike with the Nomai, the player interacts with the aliens to add to the horror elements. Their design was changed iteratively throughout development to be frightening while still human enough to visually emote in the slide reel images. Prahlow returned as the composer for the expansion, incorporating new instruments alongside the ones from the original soundtrack to give the impression of stepping into somewhere new and scary but still anchored to where the player character came from. Echoes of the Eye was released as downloadable content for all platforms on September 28, 2021. A soundtrack album, Outer Wilds: Echoes of the Eye Original Game Soundtrack, was released the same day, and an expanded version, Outer Wilds: Echoes of the Eye (The Lost Reels), was published the following year. A vinyl version, Secrets From The Outer Wilds, released on September 19, 2024.

== Reception ==
Reception

Aggregate score
Aggregator	Score
Metacritic	(PC) 85/100 (XONE) 85/100 (PS4) 82/100

Review scores
Publication	Score
Destructoid	9/10
Game Informer	7.75/10
GameSpot	9/10
IGN	8.4/10
Jeuxvideo.com	18/20
PC Gamer (US)	89/100
USgamer	5/5

Outer Wilds received "generally favorable reviews", according to the review aggregator website Metacritic. Its aggregated scores ranked it as one of the top 30 games of 2019 for Windows, Xbox One, and PlayStation 4. It was estimated as having sold over 2 million copies by August 2021, just before the expansion was released. The game was featured in several game of the year lists for 2019, including overall game of the year by Eurogamer and Polygon, and Edge, Polygon, PC World, and Paste also featured it on their "best games of the decade", "best games of the console generation", and "best games of the past 30 years" lists, Slant, GQ, and USA Today featured it on their "best games of all times" lists, and Eurogamer in 2024 said it was the 3rd best game that was available for current systems.

Critics highly praised the gameplay, though some aspects had a mixed reception. Alessandro Barbosa of GameSpot praised the way each step in the loop of discovery "feels like a hard-earned reward", while mrderiv of Jeuxvideo.com said that the game creates a constant desire to solve the next mystery without them being too overwhelming or obtuse. The changes to the planetary system over the time loop were often compared to clockwork, with Josh Tolentino of Destructoid calling it a "tightly packed cuckoo clock" and Javy Gwaltney of Game Informer and Edwin Evans-Thirlwell of Eurogamer comparing it to a pocket watch. Phil Savage of PC Gamer also praised the unique, evolving nature of the different planets. Reviewers praised the adventure aspects of the game; Colin Campbell of Polygon applauded the exploration and the continual sense of discovering new things, and Jake Green of USGamer called Outer Wilds "an adventure game in the purest sense". The reviewers for Destructoid, Jeuxvideo.com, and PC Gamer, however, found themselves stuck at points later in the game without a clear direction, and the reviewers for Game Informer, GameSpot, and Polygon criticized the potential for the player to die or be unable to complete a goal in a loop due to what they perceived as unfairly difficult or unexpected gameplay.

Reviewers also praised the graphics and aesthetics. Game Informer said that "the art style is gorgeous and memorable", while Jeuxvideo.com said it was simple but pleasing and PC Gamer called it "expressive" and "characterful". Several reviewers, such as GameSpot and Mike Epstein of IGN, praised the uniqueness and variation of the planets, and Destructoid called the game setting "bespoke and intimate in scale". Eurogamer called out the Nomai writing as particularly of note for giving a "feeling of displaced community, of mutual striving across the extinction barrier". PC Gamer also noted the soundtrack as "blend[ing] Hearthian personality with the promise of sci-fi revelations", Game Informer said it reflected the aesthetics and personality of the game, and Jeuxvideo.com said it perfectly carried the player on to the next mystery. Polygon concluded that "Outer Wilds is a game of intense originality, charm and beauty".

=== Echoes of the Eye ===
Echoes of the Eye also received "generally favorable reviews", according to Metacritic. Alessandro Barbosa of GameSpot and Indee of Jeuxvideo.com praised the size of the expansion, with Cameron Faulkner of The Verge saying that it was different and large enough to be considered a new game. GameSpot, Matthew Castle of Rock Paper Shotgun, and Evans-Thirlwell of Eurogamer praised the new mechanics and puzzles of the expansion, and Jeuxvideo.com, Tom Marks of IGN, and Chris Plante of Polygon praised the way the DLC was integrated into the base game. The horror elements received some criticism, however; IGN said only that they were not as good as the rest of the game, but GameSpot called them "frustrating" and "consistently disappointing".

Several reviewers, such as Jeuxvideo.com, Eurogamer, and The Verge, praised the visual and level design of the Stranger, with The Verge saying that they "marvel[ed] at the artistic and technical achievement". Rock Paper Shotgun applauded the way the themes and design echoed and related to that of the base game. The story was also praised, with Jeuxvideo.com and Eurogamer appreciating the way it is told visually as opposed to the base game's text. GameSpot praised the combination of the level design of the Stranger and the soundtrack. Polygon concluded that Echoes of the Eye was a "masterpiece living within another masterpiece".

=== Awards ===
At the 2015 Game Developers Conference-sponsored Independent Games Festival, Outer Wilds won in the Seumas McNally Grand Prize and Excellence in Design categories. It was an honorable mention in the Excellence in Narrative and Nuovo Award categories. After release, it was nominated for multiple categories at several award shows, including for Game of the Year at the Golden Joystick Awards, the D.I.C.E. Awards, the Game Developers Choice Awards, and the British Academy Games Awards, winning Best Indie Game at the Golden Joystick Awards and Best Game, Game Design, and Original Property awards at the British Academy Games Awards. The soundtrack for Echoes of the Eye additionally won the Best Music for an Indie Game category at the Game Audio Network Guild Awards.

Awards and nominations
Year	Award	Category	Result	Ref.
2015	Independent Games Festival Awards	Seumas McNally Grand Prize	Won	
2015	Independent Games Festival Awards	Excellence in Design	Won	
2015	Independent Games Festival Awards	Nuovo Award	Nominated	
2018	Game Critics Awards	Best Independent Game	Nominated	
2019	Golden Joystick Awards	Game of the Year	Nominated	
2019	Golden Joystick Awards	Best Visual Design	Nominated	
2019	Golden Joystick Awards	Best Storytelling	Nominated	
2019	Golden Joystick Awards	Best Indie Game	Won	
2019	Golden Joystick Awards	Best Audio	Nominated	
2019	Golden Joystick Awards	Xbox Game of the Year	Nominated	
2019	The Game Awards 2019	Best Game Direction	Nominated	
2019	The Game Awards 2019	Best Independent Game	Nominated	
2019	The Game Awards 2019	Fresh Indie Game (Mobius Digital)	Nominated	
2020	23rd Annual D.I.C.E. Awards	Game of the Year	Nominated	
2020	23rd Annual D.I.C.E. Awards	Outstanding Achievement in Game Direction	Nominated	
2020	23rd Annual D.I.C.E. Awards	Outstanding Achievement in Game Design	Nominated	
2020	23rd Annual D.I.C.E. Awards	Outstanding Achievement in Story	Nominated	
2020	20th Game Developers Choice Awards	Game of the Year	Nominated	
2020	20th Game Developers Choice Awards	Best Debut (Mobius Digital)	Nominated	
2020	20th Game Developers Choice Awards	Best Design	Nominated	
2020	20th Game Developers Choice Awards	Innovation Award	Nominated	
2020	20th Game Developers Choice Awards	Best Narrative	Nominated	
2020	SXSW Gaming Awards	Excellence in Design	Nominated	
2020	SXSW Gaming Awards	Excellence in Musical Score	Nominated	
2020	SXSW Gaming Awards	Excellence in Narrative	Nominated	
2020	16th British Academy Games Awards	Best Game	Won	
2020	16th British Academy Games Awards	Game Design	Won	
2020	16th British Academy Games Awards	Music	Nominated	
2020	16th British Academy Games Awards	Narrative	Nominated	
2020	16th British Academy Games Awards	Original Property	Won	
2020	Game Audio Network Guild Awards	Best Music for an Indie Game	Nominated	
2020	Game Audio Network Guild Awards	Best Interactive Score	Nominated	
2022	Game Audio Network Guild Awards	Best Music for an Indie Game (Echoes of the Eye)	Won	
2022	Game Audio Network Guild Awards	Best Main Theme (Echoes of the Eye)	Nominated	
2022	Game Audio Network Guild Awards	Technical Achievement in Music (Echoes of the Eye)	Nominated	
