= Kate Edwards =

American geographer

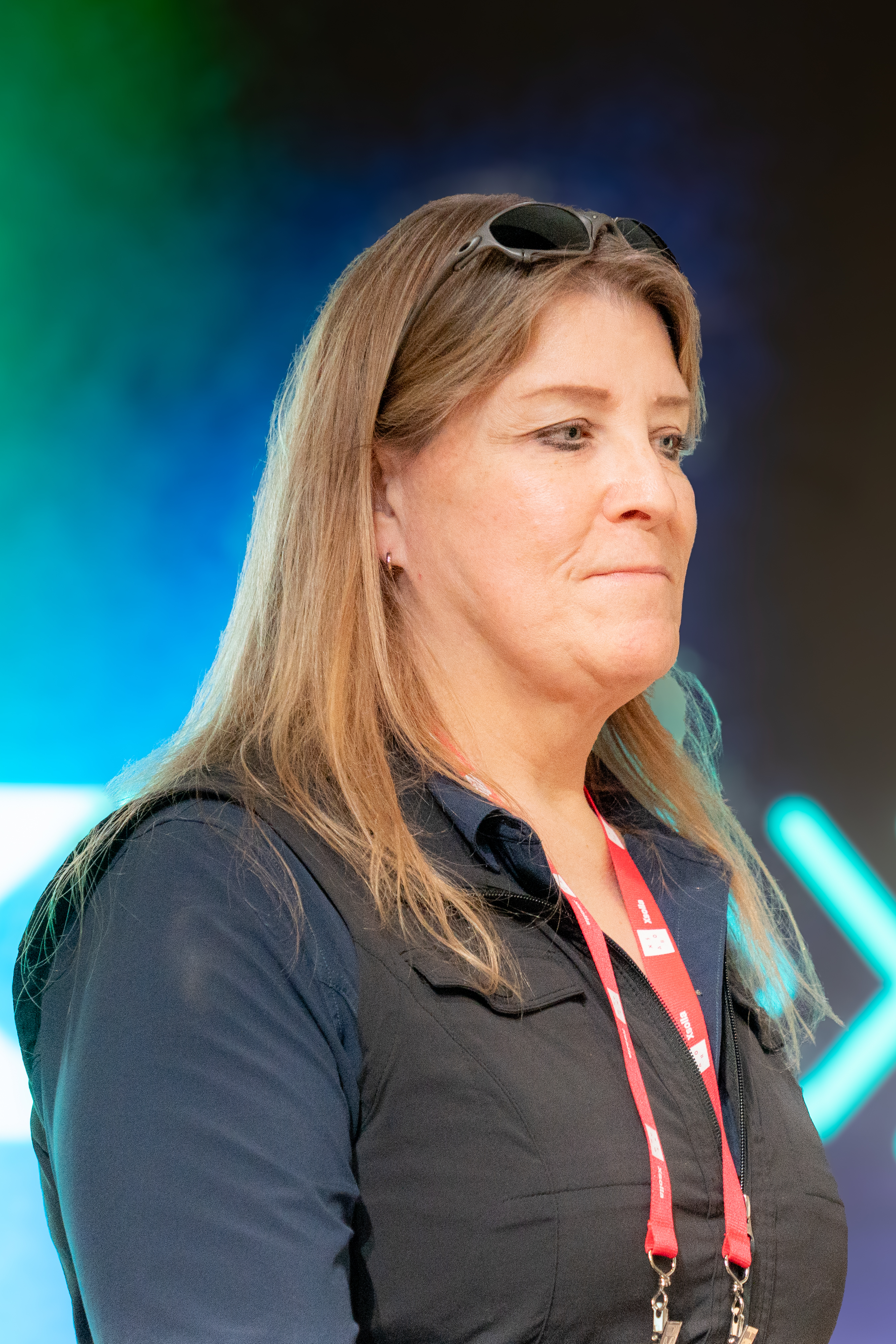
- Edwards at GB Next 2025
- Born: Los Angeles
- Citizenship: United States
- Education: California State University Long Beach; University of Washington
- Occupations: Geographer; Executive Director; Consultant
- Known for: Executive Director of International Game Developers Association
- Scientific career
- Fields: Geography; Cartography; Video games Geopolitics; Author
- Workplaces: University of Washington; Microsoft; Geogrify LLC; International Game Developers Association

Kate Edwards (born c. 1965) is a geographer, writer, and content culturalization strategist, most active in information-based cartography and video game content. She was the executive director of the International Game Developers Association from December 2012 to June 2017. Edwards spent over a decade working in various roles at Microsoft, creating the Geopolitical Strategy team and working to evaluate and manage geopolitical and cultural content in software products. After leaving Microsoft she founded Englobe (now Geogrify) as a consulting firm engaged in content culturalization and strategy, primarily for the video game industry.

== Education and career ==
Edwards received a B.A. in geography and a certificate in cartography from California State University, Long Beach. She received an M.A. and PhD in geography at the University of Washington.

Edwards was the geopolitical strategist for Microsoft between 1992 and 2005. She assisted with Microsoft's virtual earth technology and Encarta World Atlas project. She proposed and founded a new team called Geopolitical Strategy in 1998. As Microsoft's Senior Geopolitical Strategist, Edwards was responsible for the risk assessment of geopolitical and cultural content across all products and locales. In the Microsoft Studios, Edwards implemented a geopolitical quality review process which was used to evaluate PC and Xbox titles.

In March 2005, she left Microsoft to launch Englobe (now Geogrify), a consulting firm specializing in content culturalization and strategy in video games, cartography and general cultural sensitivities in digital content. Through Englobe, Edwards was involved on games such as Dragon Age II and Star Wars: The Old Republic.

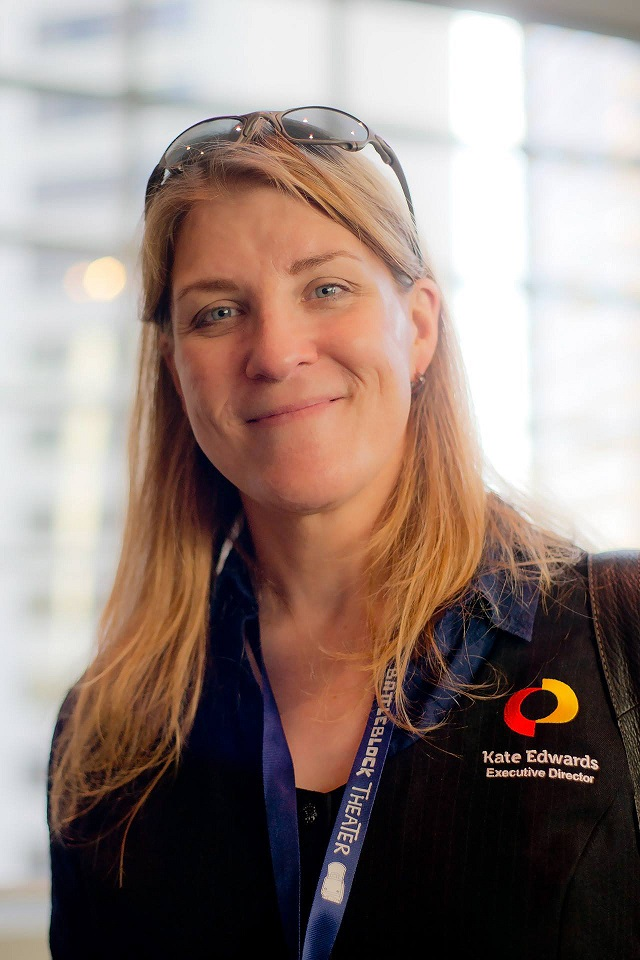
Edwards in 2014

Edwards was the founder and chair of the Game Localization Special Interest Group (SIG) in the International Game Developers Association (IGDA), and served as a board of directors member for the IGDA Seattle chapter. Edwards was awarded the IGDA's 2011 MVP award for her contributions to the organization and to the game industry. In December 2012, she was appointed as the executive director of the International Game Developers Association after Gordon Bellamy moved on from the position. Edwards left IDGA in 2017.

Edwards was listed as one of "The 10 Most Powerful Women In Gaming" in 2013 by Fortune, and in 2014 she was named as one of the video games industry's six "People of the Year".

Edwards conceived of the 50 Over 50 List to showcase game developers who were over the age of 50, and "as a response to the reality that ageism is a rampant problem in the game industry and within the broader technology sector." The yearly list was first published in 2018.

Edwards received the Ambassador Award at the 20th Game Developers Choice Awards in March 2020 for her past work in the IGDA and current work in the Global Game Jam.

In 2021, Edwards was inducted into the Women in Games Hall of Fame.
