= 20th Game Developers Choice Awards =

2020 video game awards ceremony

- Date: March 18, 2020
- Venue: Online
- Hosted by: Kim Swift

Highlights
- Most awards: Control (3)
- Most nominations: Death Stranding (7)
- Ambassador Award: Kate Edwards
- Pioneer Award: Roberta Williams
- Game of the Year: Untitled Goose Game

The 20th Game Developers Choice Awards was an award ceremony by Game Developers Choice Awards for outstanding game developers and video games held on March 18, 2020, hosted by Kim Swift. Though normally held at the Game Developers Conference, due to the 2020 coronavirus outbreak, the conference was postponed to later in 2020, and the awards were presented via online streaming media, alongside the Independent Games Festival awards.

Kate Edwards, former head of the International Game Developers Association and current head of the Global Game Jam, will receive the Ambassador Award for her past and current work in the industry.

Following from a similar event with The Game Awards 2019, Geoff Keighley worked with several of the games featured in the Awards as well as other indie developers to present forty game demos to be available from March 18 to March 23 through Steam as part of the Steam Game Festival - Spring Edition. Keighley planned to offer further events throughout the year to tie to other award shows and game conferences. In addition to games that were featured as part of the GDC and IGF, the Steam Game Festival also featured demos from other GDC-sponsored events that had been affected by the pandemic such as the Indie Megabooth and the Day of the Devs.

== Winners and nominees ==
Nominees were announced on January 8, 2020, and winners (in bold below) named on March 18, 2020.

=== Game of the Year ===
- **Untitled Goose Game (House House/Panic)**
  - Death Stranding (Kojima Productions/Sony Interactive Entertainment)
  - Control (Remedy Entertainment/505 Games)
  - Sekiro: Shadows Die Twice (FromSoftware/Activision)
  - Outer Wilds (Mobius Digital/Annapurna Interactive)

=== Best Audio ===
- **Control (Remedy Entertainment/505 Games)**
  - Death Stranding (Kojima Productions/Sony Interactive Entertainment)
  - Sayonara Wild Hearts (Simogo/Annapurna Interactive)
  - Untitled Goose Game (House House/Panic)
  - Call of Duty: Modern Warfare (Infinity Ward/Activision)

=== Best Debut Developer ===
- **ZA/UM (Disco Elysium)**
  - Mobius Digital (Outer Wilds)
  - William Chyr Studios(Manifold Garden)
  - Foam Sword Games (Knights and Bikes)
  - Chance Agency (Neo Cab)

=== Best Design ===
- **Baba Is You (Hempuli)**
  - Outer Wilds (Mobius Digital/Annapurna Interactive)
  - Death Stranding (Kojima Productions/Sony Interactive Entertainment)
  - Sekiro: Shadows Die Twice (FromSoftware/Activision)
  - Untitled Goose Game (House House/Panic)

=== Best Mobile Game ===
- **What the Golf? (Triband/The Label)**
  - Sayonara Wild Hearts (Simogo/Annapurna Interactive)
  - Grindstone (Capybara Games)
  - Sky: Children of the Light (thatgamecompany)
  - Call of Duty: Mobile (TiMi Studios/Activision)

=== Innovation Award ===
- **Baba Is You (Hempuli)**
  - Untitled Goose Game (House House/Panic)
  - Disco Elysium (ZA/UM)
  - Death Stranding (Kojima Productions/Sony Interactive Entertainment)
  - Outer Wilds (Mobius Digital/Annapurna Interactive)

=== Best Narrative ===
- **Disco Elysium (ZA/UM)**
  - Control (Remedy Entertainment/505 Games)
  - Death Stranding (Kojima Productions/Sony Interactive Entertainment)
  - The Outer Worlds (Obsidian Entertainment/Private Division)
  - Outer Wilds (Mobius Digital/Annapurna Interactive)

=== Best Technology ===
- **Control (Remedy Entertainment/505 Games)**
  - Death Stranding (Kojima Productions/Sony Interactive Entertainment)
  - Call of Duty: Modern Warfare (Infinity Ward/Activision)
  - Apex Legends (Respawn Entertainment/Electronic Arts)
  - Noita (Nolla Games)

=== Best Visual Art ===
- **Control (Remedy Entertainment/505 Games)**
  - Death Stranding (Kojima Productions/Sony Interactive Entertainment)
  - Sekiro: Shadows Die Twice (FromSoftware/Activision)
  - Sayonara Wild Hearts (Simogo/Annapurna Interactive)
  - Disco Elysium (ZA/UM)

=== Best VR/AR Game ===
- **Vader Immortal (ILMxLAB/Disney)**
  - Blood & Truth (SCEE Studio London/Sony Interactive Entertainment)
  - Asgard's Wrath (Sanzaru Games/Oculus Studios)
  - Boneworks (Stress Level Zero)
  - Pistol Whip (Cloudhead Games)

=== Audience Award ===
- Sky: Children of the Light (Thatgamecompany)

=== Pioneer Award ===
- **Roberta Williams**

=== Ambassador Award ===
- **Kate Edwards**

== In Memorandum ==
The ceremony honored the following individuals that died over the prior year:

- Stephan Ash
- Keith Boesky
- Ryan Brant
- Jason Brookes
- Craig Goodman
- Anita Hamil Frazier
- Kazuhisa Hashimoto
- Steve Henifin
- Takashi Iwade
- Brad McQuaid
- Patrick Munnik
- Andy O'Neil
- Tim Skelly
- Mark Vitello
- Jose Zambrano
