= Year Walk =

2013 video game

- iOS icon
- Developer: Simogo
- Publisher: Simogo: JP: Nintendo (Wii U)
- Writer: Jonas Tarestad
- Composers: Daniel Olsén, Jonathan Eng
- Engine: Unity
- Platforms: iOS, OS X, Microsoft Windows, Wii U
- Release: iOS; 21 February 2013; Microsoft Windows; 6 March 2014; OS X 3 April 2014; Wii U: WW: 17 September 2015; JP: 13 November 2015
- Genre: Adventure
- Mode: Single-player

Year Walk is a 2013 adventure game developed and published by Swedish mobile game developer Simogo for iOS devices. The game is loosely based on an ancient Swedish tradition called "Årsgång" (pronounced [ˈoːʂgɔŋ] or [ˈoːrsˌɡoŋ] depending on dielect; "Year Walk"). The game was ported to Windows and OS X PC platforms via Steam in 2014, and on the Wii U via eShop on 17 September 2015. It was succeeded by the free, e-picturebook Year Walk: Bedtime Stories for Awful Children.

== Plot ==
Year Walk begins with the protagonist Daniel Svensson visiting his lover, Stina, who hints that she has been proposed to, and warns the player about the dangers of year walking (a divination ritual on New Year’s Eve which involves circling a churchyard). She also implies that her cousin had died while engaging in the activity. Daniel returns home, and prepares to engage in the Year Walk anyway.

As he proceeds towards the church, the protagonist encounters a series of fairies and mythical creatures from Swedish folklore: the Huldra, the Brook Horse, Mylings, the Night Raven, and finally the Church Grim.

In the end, the player succeeds in receiving glimpses of the future, in the form of ominous bits of conversation that are presumably from Stina. They then see a beautiful grassy meadow. When they venture right, they see Stina on the ground, her eyes closed. At first, she appears unharmed, but then blood seeps from her chest onto her clothes and the grass.

If the player uses the hints given after the credits to access the Journal component of the PC Game/iOS companion app, they can discover the journal of Theodor Almsten, a modern-day man obsessed with Swedish folklore, as he investigates the meaning behind the Year Walk. Through his research, the full story is revealed. The fate of Almsten himself is also uncertain; his research seems to have taken a toll on his mental state, and his final entry takes place immediately before he went on a Year Walk of his own. However, Almsten believes that the desire to Year Walk alone is enough to be punished for the Watchers, so it is implied he met the same fate as Daniel Svennson.

Ultimately, clues from the Journal can be used in-game to reach an alternate ending, considered the ultimate ending (as it says "the end"). Daniel receives a knife along with a newspaper article from the future describing his execution for the murder of Stina, and a letter from Almsten telling him to do what must be done to save Stina. It is left ambiguous whether Daniel kills himself or uses the knife to conduct the murder.

== Development ==
Year Walk started out as a film script that writer Jonas Tarestad shared with developer Simon Flesser. The two considered turning the script into a game, according to Flesser, "almost jokingly to start with". However the two eventually grew serious about the prospect and changed the script so that it would better suit the medium. In the transition from movie script to game script, according to Flesser, they "basically rewrote everything about it" keeping only the beginning and ending the same. In designing the game Flesser studied horror movies, specifically the timing "to get the scary bits right". He has additionally cited the games Killer7, Fez and The Legend of Zelda series as well as the film Hedgehog in the Fog as inspiration.

In collaboration with Dakko Dakko, the developers behind Scram Kitty and his Buddy on Rails, Simogo rebuilt the game from the ground up for release on Nintendo's Wii U console in 2015, taking advantage of the Wii U GamePad for various mechanics.

== Reception ==
Reception

Aggregate score
Aggregator	Score
Metacritic	iOS: 87/100; PC: 87/100; WIIU: 82/100

Review score
Publication	Score
TouchArcade	5/5

Year Walk received "generally favorable reviews", according to the review aggregator platform Metacritic.

148 Apps praised nearly every aspect of the game, writing that "Year Walk is a haunting adventure game from Simogo that blends a dark world and involved mythology together to create an absolutely amazing experience." TouchArcade liked Year Walk's companion app, feeling it freed up the game from having to rely on exposition, "Knowing which creatures exist and what they’re capable of... makes every screen transition, every peek inside an abandoned shack fraught with apprehension". Game Informer enjoyed the puzzles, saying that they often relied on clever solutions, "each demands that you think in a new and surprising way, and draws you deeper into the cold and minimalistic presentation".

IGN criticized the puzzle design of the game, noting that it could often lean into obtuse solutions, "there are a handful of obstacles that are oblique in their presentation and execution, to the point where I nearly lost all motivation for solving them". Pocket Gamer liked the game's atmosphere, describing it as "pervasively uneasy". PC Gamer praised the constant variety in Year Walk, writing, "It's in turn bamboozling and disturbing, constantly throwing up both chilling curiosities and fresh interactive experiences". Nintendo Life felt the game's story left a lasting impact, "Like most great art, though, Year Walk sticks with you well beyond your time with it".

As for the Wii U version, Nintendo World Report enjoyed the title's use of motion controls with the GamePad, "This creates a whole new way to solve puzzles, from carefully manipulating an object to large and fast movements".

At the 2013 Unity Awards, Year Walk won the award for Best 2D Artistic Experience. Year Walk was included in Pocket Gamer's "top 10 best iPhone and iPad games of the year - 2013 edition" list.

The game sold 200,000 copies in 2013.
