= Device 6 =

2013 video game

- App Store icon
- Developer: Simogo
- Publisher: Simogo
- Engine: Unity
- Platforms: iOS; Simogo Legacy Collection; Nintendo Switch; Nintendo Switch 2; Windows
- Release: 17 October 2013: Simogo Legacy Collection; WW: December 1, 2025
- Genre: Interactive fiction
- Mode: Single-player

Device 6 (stylized as DEVICE 6) is a text-based adventure game developed by Swedish game developer Simogo, released in 2013 for iOS. The game uses text, images and sounds to guide the player through a set of puzzles, which the in-game protagonist, Anna, needs to solve to escape from an unknown island. In 2025, the game was made available on Windows, Nintendo Switch and Nintendo Switch 2 as part of the Simogo Legacy Collection.

== Gameplay ==
The player must rotate their device to read certain lines of text as they navigate through the game world.

Device 6 uses mainly text in its gameplay, and the player swipes the screen to move through or review the story. The text may turn or split into branches in certain points of the game, adapting to the protagonist's movements in the story. The player uses buttons to interact with in-game elements shown in black-and-white pictures like machines to get hints or to solve a puzzle.

== Plot ==
The game begins with Anna, the protagonist, waking up in an unknown castle, only with an unpleasant doll in her memory. Throughout her journey, she meets strange people and creatures appearing to be unresponsive or electronically controlled, raising her suspicion.

In the end, its revealed that an organization named HAT knocked her out with a doll, and drove her to the island, letting her explore the island and exposing her to a fake story in hope of making her join the organization.

However, she never believed anything of the things she experienced in the island, and finds out that shes trapped on the island by a device named DEVICE 4, used for creating the text and images you see in the game, she then destroys the device, eventually killing herself.

Its then revealed that the points that you collect in the game, can be used to buy the same doll that knocked her out.

== Reception ==
Device 6

Aggregate score
Aggregator	Score
Metacritic	92/100

Review scores
Publication	Score
Edge	9/10
Eurogamer	9/10
Game Informer	8.75/10
IGN	9.5/10
Gamezebo	4.5/5
Digital Spy	5/5
TouchArcade	5/5

Awards
Publication	Award
Apple	Apple Design Awards 2014
IGF	Excellence in Audio
Pocket Gamer	2014 Best App Ever
Pocket Gamer	2014 Most Innovative Game

Device 6 has received highly positive reviews from critics. The game is listed with a score of 92/100, indicating "universal acclaim" on review aggregation site Metacritic. Critics applaud the game for its creative way of storytelling, the well-written prose and the audio effects, while noting its short gameplay.

The game won the Excellence in Audio award in the 2014 Independent Games Festival, Apple Design Awards 2014, 2014 Best App Ever Award from Pocket Gamer and several others. It was also nominated for several BAFTA Games Awards.

As of March 2014, the game has sold 200,000 copies on App Store, according to the developer.

== Soundtrack ==
Music in Device 6 is composed by Daniel Olsén. The soundtrack album of the game, DEVICE 6 Original Soundtrack, was released on 1 November 2013. The singer of the lead single in the album, Jonathan Eng, also makes an appearance in-game.
