= The Room (disambiguation) =

The Room is a 2003 American romantic drama film.

The Room may also refer to:

== Film and television ==
- The Room (2019 film), a French horror film
- "The Room", 2001 series episode, see list of Six Feet Under episodes
- "The Room", 2005 series episode, see list of Life with Derek episodes
- "The Room", late 1980s projected series episode, see Captain Power and the Soldiers of the Future

== Gaming ==
- The Room (video game), a 2012 puzzle game
  - The Room Two, a 2013 sequel
  - The Room Three, a 2015 second sequel
  - The Room: Old Sins, the 2018 fourth game in the series
  - The Room VR: A Dark Matter, the 2020 virtual reality spinoff sequel
- The Room Tribute or The Room: The Game, a 2010 adventure game based on the 2003 film
- Silent Hill 4: The Room (2004)

== Literature ==
- The Room (novel), a 1971 novel by Hubert Selby Jr.
- The Room (play), a 1957 play by Harold Pinter

== Music ==
- The Room (band), a 1980s new wave band from Liverpool
- The Room (album), a 2000 album by Harold Budd
- The Room (EP), a 2005 EP by Zoé
- "The Room" (song), a 2010 song by the Twilight Sad
- "The Room (Brainwash)", a 1981 song by Rick Wakeman from 1984

== Other uses ==
- The Room (store), a section in some Hudson's Bay department stores

== See also ==
- Room (disambiguation)
- The Rooms, a cultural facility in St. John's, Canada
- Basements, a TV film by Robert Altman featuring Pinter's play
- The Lost Room, a 2006 science fiction mini-series
