= Roome =

Roome may refer to:

== Places ==
- Roome Township, Polk County, Minnesota, U.S.

== People ==
- Alfred Roome (1908–1997), British film editor and director
- Charles Roome (1812–1890), American soldier and engineer
- Edward Roome (died 1729), English lawyer and writer
- Horace Roome (1887–1964), British army officer, father of Oliver Roome
- Howard Roome (died 1931), American football player
- Ian Roome, British politician
- John Roome (born 1972), British hiphop artist
- Oliver Roome (1921–2009), British army officer, son of Horace Roome
- William Frederick Roome (1841–1921), Canadian politician

== See also ==
- Room (disambiguation)
