= Room (disambiguation) =

A room is an enclosed space in a building.

Room or rooms may also refer to:

== Arts, entertainment and media ==
- Room (2005 film), an independent drama film
- Room (novel), by Emma Donoghue, 2010
  - Room (2015 film), an independent drama film, based on the novel
  - Room (play), a Broadway play, based on the novel and the film
- Room: The Mystery, a 2014 Indian thriller film
- Room (Katey Sagal album), 2004
- Room (Nels Cline and Julian Lage album), 2014
- Room (magazine), a Canadian quarterly literary journal
- Rooms (album), by Goya Dress
- "Rooms" (song), by Mike Will Made It, YoungBoy Never Broke Again and Chief Keef
- "Rooms", a song by Inhale Exhale from the 2009 album Bury Me Alive
- Rooms (TV series), 1970s British drama serial

== People ==
- Abram Room (1894–1976), a Russian film director
- Adrian Room (1933–2011), a British toponymist and onomastician
- Eloy Room (born 1989), a Dutch-Curaçaoan footballer
- Frederick George Room (1895–1932), an English recipient of Victoria Cross
- Henry Room (1802–1850), an English painter
- Thomas Gerald Room (1902–1986), an Australian mathematician

== Other uses ==
- Room (Chinese constellation)
- Real-Time Object-Oriented Modeling, a domain specific language
- Room for PlayStation Portable (ROOM), a social networking service
- Room, an obsolete unit of measurement for coal

== See also ==
- The Room (disambiguation)
- Roome (disambiguation)
- Rheum
- Rum, Nepal
- Room number, a number assigned to a room within a building
