= The Incident at Galley House =

2026 video game

- Developer: Evil Trout Inc
- Designer: William Rous
- Artist: Henning Ludvigsen
- Engine: Godot
- Platforms: Linux; macOS; Windows
- Release: 14 July 2026
- Genre: Puzzle
- Mode: Single-player

The Incident at Galley House is a 2026 horror and mystery-themed puzzle video game developed by Evil Trout for Linux, macOS and Windows. It is a remake of the 2025 text-based browser game Type Help. Given an advanced machine which allows a psychic glimpse into the past, the player is tasked with solving an unexplained series of deaths which occurred in the titular manor. The game was well received for its gameplay, narrative, and thematic complexity.

== Gameplay ==
The game makes use of a point and click interface, through which the player can interact with the psychic machinery. The machine can be provided with codes to view scenes from the past, in the format 01-XX-1-2-3... The first digits correspond to a time period, the letters to a location in or near the house, and finally the following numbers to the IDs of the different characters present in a scene. The letters of locations are not given and deducing them is part of the puzzle. In order to view a scene, the player must therefore deduce when, and where, a particular group of people were. This is generally derived from conversation hints, observing known character movement, and process of elimination. There is also some documentation available for the player to examine. This includes historic photographs of the known victims which come with descriptions of the condition in which they were found. Additionally, a scanner will occasionally reproduce documents found in scenes, and other documents appear for initially-mysterious reasons over the course of the investigation.

The machine does offer some assistance in keeping track of the different locations, people, and scenes which have been established. It's for example possible to search transcripts of known scenes. Nonetheless some reviewers suggest that the player keep a notebook handy to make their own records. The game is 10 to 12 hours in length.

== Plot ==
Reya, an engineer for spectronoetic technology company D&M enters the abandoned Galley House. The house was the site of a set of mysterious deaths in 1936 and has sat vacant since. With the aid of a "seance machine" which allows the user to see into the past, she begins the task of uncovering exactly what happened during the incident.

In 1936, piano salesman John Hobbes arrives to the Galley House where a family gathering is held; Hobbes claims to have a letter of invitation from "Rupert Galley", but of the Galley family present, nobody can recall a "Rupert Galley" as part of the family. After the gathering in the living room, Hobbes and the butler Harry Thornton uncover a dead body lying in the study, which only Thornton can identify as Rupert. After Thornton's sudden and unexplained death, nobody in the house can remember him either; Hobbes puts this down to people not knowing the servant on a personal basis.

As Reya continues tracking these deaths through the house, it becomes apparent that a strange curse is at work: Whenever someone dies, there is a thunderclap, and everyone who knew the victim all forget they ever existed – even if they were in the same room as the person dying – leading to confused horror as dead bodies seemingly begin manifesting in the house. However, as soon as someone remembers who the last deceased person was, often via some memento, they themselves die and are forgotten. In this fashion, with the house isolated by geography and poor weather, a chain of deaths moves through the family. With parts of the family tree missing, people at the house begin forgetting the familial ties that originally connected them all; in particular Rupert's brother Oswald is left with no apparent link to the others and is ostracized. He realises what is happening during a visit to the on-site chapel, but is too late to do anything about it and is killed by the curse. In her final moments, the guest Annie Beaumont shoots herself in the hopes that it will break the chain, but committing suicide before the curse can kill her fails; when Hobbes speaks to Annie's mother Katherine on the phone – not understanding why he is alone in a house full of corpses – the curse leaps to Katherine when she remembers her daughter, killing her as well. Hobbes comes to believe he is responsible for the killings and commits suicide by jumping to his death from the attic window.

In the present day, just as Reya understands the mechanism behind the deaths, a corpse appears in the room she is studying in, holding a note instructing her to use the machine to view the events of that night. It becomes apparent that there were other engineers helping her through the night, who she cannot remember now, and that the curse has returned to Galley House after having killed many across the world in the years since. She identifies the chain of deaths that have gone through the other people in the house, and that they were seemingly brought to Galley House by Meg, an engineer who has also died to the curse, and who was the last in the chain to pass away.

However, another lightning strike occurs, causing an additional person to appear in the memories. This person is Ervin, the mysterious founder of D&M who had been investigating it for years. He had never found the curse's origin, but set about ending it after he lost his wife and children to it. Understanding the mechanism behind it, he deliberately used a bag of mementos to guide the curse into killing everyone who ever knew him. With Meg's assistance, he then invited his old colleagues, along with a relation of the most recent victim in the chain to the manor to kill the last of them. Reya was not part of the plan, as she had only recently joined the company and never actually met Ervin, having been invited along by another engineer. At last, Ervin burns down the chapel and examines a memento from Meg to draw the curse into himself. He dies in the knowledge that with every trace of his existence removed and everyone once close to him dead, nobody in the world will remember he ever lived, and so the curse will end with him. In doing so, he causes Reya to forget his existence, so it seems that he only just appeared in the machine after this death. When Reya learns his story, she sets fire to the manor and leaves.

== Development ==
The game is a remake of Type Help (2025), a free text-based browser game developed by William Rous. The original game was inspired by Return of the Obra Dinn, Her Story, Unheard, and The Roottrees are Dead, the last of which was also remade by Evil Trout. Rous had the idea for Type Help while studying at university, and tinkered with it for two years. It was built in Twine and exported to HTML. He indicated in interview that he had "lost faith in it", and simply released for free on Itch.io so that it would count as a shipped title. When Evil Trout's owner Robin Ward came across Type Help, he was taken with it. He described it as offering the same feeling that Roottrees evoked, and contacted Rous on Discord before he had even finished playing.

Evil Trout remade the game, adding voice acting and a graphical presentation on a budget of $250,000, largely funded by the success of Roottrees. The addition of the machine interface came from a desire to better support controllers, as mouse-only design had hampered Roottrees several years earlier. The more tactile design for the machine came from Jeremy Johnston, the original designer of Roottrees and by that stage a member of Evil Trout. The team utilized the Godot engine running on Linux, which did necessitate setting up a Windows and Mac build server to package the project for those platforms. Some in-house tooling was produced including importers to bring in game data from the spreadsheets they were authored in, as well as a scene editor. The game used priority rendering to handle layering within the scenes. Evil Trout mentioned that localization was among the most challenging part of the game's development, given a need to edit custom textures like newspapers.

The remake's new final act was first built in text-only form through Twine by Rous, and tested in that fashion by external players. This was a cost effective way of doing so, given that it didn't require the art and voice work at that stage. Asked about their success with that kind of remake, Ward commented that “I’m still not sure whether lighting struck me twice in terms of finding these awesome gems... or if Itch is just full of them, and few people are paying attention.”

== Reception ==
Reception

Aggregate scores
Aggregator	Score
Metacritic	84/100
OpenCritic	92% recommend

The Incident at Galley House received generally favorable reviews from critics, according to the review aggregation website Metacritic. Fellow review aggregator OpenCritic assessed that the game received "mighty" approval, being recommended by 92% of critics.

Polygon commented that it could be the best mystery game of the year, or at least the "most unusual remake". The operation of the machine, which involves turning various dials and knobs, has been described as giving the game a gothic science fiction aesthetic and moving away from the police procedural approach that would usually be associated with a murder mystery story. The interface was positively received, with Bloody Disgusting offering praise for the moment of tension waiting to see if a code would work. The game was praised for the manner in which it approaches themes of grief, and the fear of forgetting lost ones. The visual and audio presentation was well regarded, particularly the voice work. The graphics are compared favourably to the illustrative style of the studio's previous work with The Roottrees are Dead.

Criticism of the final act (new for the remake) was more mixed. Some found it confusing or criticised the reliance on longer scenes and exposition. It was more positively received by A. V. Club which described it as "a few flashes of deep cleverness that serve as a reminder of what made Type Help so exceptional."

=== Comparison to Type Help ===
Many reviewers made comparisons between the original text based version and the remake; they were generally not in agreement about which version they preferred. Some reviewers preferred the original's minimalism, with Polygon for example mentioning that the psychological horror element was made less powerful by the addition of graphics. They did however welcome the additional development to the story. In contrast Bloody Disgusting commented that the higher budget presentation only served to improve on the solid detective foundation from the original. Others were more ambivalent; Digital Spy positively reviewed the original in 2025, and commented that the quality of life features introduced in the remake made the game more accessible but reduced the necessity of manual note taking, and made the game's structure feel less "personalized". The publication also found something more intimate in the manually-typed codes of the original game, over the mechanical interface of the remake.

The A. V. Club instead suggested that the nuance of the two versions would cater to different audiences. Their recommendations largely rested on the familiarity of the audience with text parser based gameplay versus the accessibility of the remake. They also suggested that players who had encountered the original game the year before give the remake a go, given the new content. There was an acknowledgement that this remake was not given a full expansion in the same way that the Roottreemania expanded The Roottrees are Dead, but the new final act was welcomed.
