= 15th British Academy Games Awards =

Game award ceremony in 2019

- Date: 4 April 2019
- Location: Queen Elizabeth Hall, South Bank, London
- Hosted by: Dara Ó Briain
- Best Game: God of War
- Most awards: God of War (5)
- Most nominations: God of War (10)

The 15th British Academy Video Game Awards was hosted by the British Academy of Film and Television Arts on 4 April 2019 at the Queen Elizabeth Hall in London to honour the best video games of 2018.

== Category changes ==
For the 15th ceremony, one new category was introduced. The EE Best Mobile Game of the Year Award is similar to the Mobile Game Award but, while the winner of the latter category is voted for by the BAFTA committee, the EE Mobile Game winner is voted for by the British public and the winners receive a special solid yellow BAFTA statuette as opposed to the standard golden statuette given to the winners of the other categories.

== Winners and nominees ==
The nominations were announced on 14 March 2019. Winners were presented on 4 April 2019.

Best Game: God of War – Santa Monica Studio / Sony Interactive Entertainment Europe; Assassin's Creed Odyssey – Ubisoft Quebec / Ubisoft; Astro Bot Rescue Mission – Japan Studio / Sony Interactive Entertainment Europe; Celeste - Maddy Makes Games Inc. / Maddy Makes Games Inc.; Red Dead Redemption 2 – Rockstar Games; Return of the Obra Dinn – Lucas Pope / 3909	Artistic Achievement: Return of the Obra Dinn – Lucas Pope / 3909; Detroit: Become Human – Quantic Dream / Sony Interactive Entertainment Europe; Gris – Nomada Studio / Devolver Digital; God of War - Santa Monica Studio / Sony Interactive Entertainment Europe; Marvel's Spider-Man – Insomniac Games / Sony Interactive Entertainment Europe; Red Dead Redemption 2 – Rockstar Games
Audio Achievement: God of War – Santa Monica Studio / Sony Interactive Entertainment Europe; Battlefield V – EA Dice / Electronic Arts; Detroit: Become Human – Quantic Dream / Sony Interactive Entertainment Europe; Marvel's Spider-Man – Insomniac Games / Sony Interactive Entertainment Europe; Red Dead Redemption 2 – Rockstar Games; Tetris Effect – Monstars Inc. and Resonair / Enhance, Inc.	British Game: Forza Horizon 4 – Playground Games / Microsoft Studios; 11-11: Memories Retold – DigixArt, Aardman & Bandai Namco Entertainment Europe / Bandai Namco Entertainment Europe; Red Dead Redemption 2 – Rockstar Games; The Room: Old Sins – Fireproof Games; Overcooked 2 – Ghost Town Games & Team17 / Team17; Two Point Hospital – Two Point Studios / Sega
Debut Game: Yoku's Island Express – Villa Gorilla / Team17; Beat Saber – Beat Games; Cultist Simulator – Weather Factory / Humble Bundle; Donut County – Ben Esposito / Annapurna Interactive; Florence – Mountains / Annapurna Interactive; Gris – Nomada Studio / Devolver Digital	EE Mobile Game: Old School RuneScape (Jagex); Brawl Stars (Supercell); Clash Royale (Supercell); Fortnite (Epic Games); Pokémon Go (The Pokémon Company/Niantic/Nintendo); Roblox (Roblox Corporation)
Evolving Game: Fortnite – Epic Games; Destiny 2: Forsaken – Bungie / Activision; Elite Dangerous: Beyond - Frontier; Overwatch – Blizzard Entertainment; Sea of Thieves - Rare / Microsoft Studios; Tom Clancy's Rainbow Six Siege – Ubisoft Montreal / Ubisoft	Family: Nintendo Labo – Nintendo EPD / Nintendo; Lego Disney Pixar's The Incredibles – TT Games / WB Games; Overcooked 2 – Ghost Town Games & Team17 / Team17; Pokémon: Let's Go, Pikachu! and Let's Go, Eevee! – Game Freak / The Pokémon Company and Nintendo; Super Mario Party – NDcube / Nintendo; Yoku's Island Express – Villa Gorilla / Team17
Game Design: Return of the Obra Dinn – Lucas Pope / 3909; Astro Bot Rescue Mission – Japan Studio / Sony Interactive Entertainment Europe; Celeste – Maddy Makes Games Inc.; God of War – Santa Monica Studio / Sony Interactive Entertainment Europe; Into the Breach – Subset Games; Minit – JW, Kitty, Jukio, and Dom / Devolver Digital	Game Innovation: Nintendo Labo – Nintendo EPD / Nintendo; Astro Bot Rescue Mission – Japan Studio / Sony Interactive Entertainment Europe; Celeste – Maddy Makes Games Inc.; Cultist Simulator – Weather Factory / Humble Bundle; Moss – Polyarc; Return of the Obra Dinn – Lucas Pope / 3909
Mobile Game: Florence – Mountains / Annapurna Interactive; Alto's Odyssey – Team Alto / Snowman; Brawl Stars – Supercell; Donut County – Ben Esposito / Annapurna Interactive; Reigns: Game of Thrones – Neiral / Devolver Digital; The Room: Old Sins – Fireproof Games	Multiplayer: A Way Out – Hazelight / EA Originals; Battlefield V – EA Dice / Electronic Arts; Overcooked 2 – Ghost Town Games & Team17 / Team17; Sea of Thieves – Rare / Microsoft Studios; Super Mario Party – NDcube / Nintendo; Super Smash Bros. Ultimate –Bandai Namco Studios and Sora Ltd. / Nintendo
Music: God of War – Santa Monica Studio / Sony Interactive Entertainment Europe; Celeste – Maddy Makes Games Inc.; Far Cry 5 – Ubisoft Montreal / Ubisoft; Florence – Mountains / Annapurna Interactive; Gris – Nomada Studio / Devolver Digital; Tetris Effect – Monstars Inc. and Resonair / Enhance, Inc.	Narrative: God of War – Santa Monica Studio / Sony Interactive Entertainment Europe; Florence – Mountains / Annapurna Interactive; Frostpunk – 11 Bit Studios; Marvel's Spider-Man – Insomniac Games / Sony Interactive Entertainment Europe; Red Dead Redemption 2 – Rockstar Games; Return of the Obra Dinn – Lucas Pope / 3909
Original Property: Into the Breach – Subset Games; Dead Cells – Motion Twin; Florence – Mountains / Annapurna Interactive; Moss – Polyarc; Return of the Obra Dinn – Lucas Pope / 3909; Subnautica – Unknown Worlds Entertainment	Performer: Jeremy Davies – God of War as The Stranger; Christopher Judge – God of War as Kratos; Danielle Bisutti – God of War as Freya; Melissanthi Mahut – Assassin's Creed Odyssey as Kassandra of Sparta; Roger Clark – Red Dead Redemption 2 as Arthur Morgan; Sunny Suljic – God of War as Atreus
Game Beyond Entertainment: My Child Lebensborn – Sarepta Studio / Teknopilot and Sarepta Studio; 11-11: Memories Retold – DigixArt, Aardman & Bandai Namco Entertainment Europe / Bandai Namco Entertainment Europe; Celeste – Maddy Makes Games Inc.; Florence – Mountains / Annapurna Interactive; Life Is Strange 2 – Dontnod Entertainment / Square Enix; Nintendo Labo – Nintendo EPD / Nintendo

=== Games with multiple nominations and wins ===
==== Nominations ====
Nominations	Game
10	God of War
6	Florence
6	Red Dead Redemption 2
6	Return of the Obra Dinn
5	Celeste
3	Astro Bot: Rescue Mission
3	Gris
3	Marvel's Spider-Man
3	Nintendo Labo
3	Overcooked 2
2	11-11: Memories Retold
2	Assassin's Creed Odyssey
2	Battlefield V
2	Brawl Stars
2	Cultist Simulator
2	Detroit: Become Human
2	Donut County
2	Fortnite
2	Into the Breach
2	Moss
2	The Room: Old Sins
2	Sea of Thieves
2	Super Mario Party
2	Tetris Effect
2	Yoku's Island Express

==== Wins ====
Wins	Game
5	God of War
2	Nintendo Labo
2	Return of the Obra Dinn
