= Sea of Thieves =

2018 video game

- Developer: Rare (Note: Purple Lamp Studios co-developed the Steam version with Rare. Third Kind Games ported it to PlayStation 5.)
- Publisher: Activision (Note: Xbox Game Studios published the game until 2026 when it was shifted to Activision.)
- Director: Gregg Mayles
- Producer: Joe Neate
- Designer: Mike Chapman
- Programmer: Peter Campbell
- Artist: Ryan Stevenson
- Writers: Chris Allcock; Mike Chapman
- Composers: Robin Beanland; Chloe Kwok
- Engine: Unreal Engine 4
- Platforms: Windows; Xbox One; Xbox Series X/S; PlayStation 5
- Release: Windows, Xbox One; 20 March 2018; Xbox Series X/S; 13 March 2024; PlayStation 5; 30 April 2024
- Genre: Action-adventure
- Mode: Multiplayer

Sea of Thieves is a 2018 action-adventure game developed by Rare and published by Activision. The player assumes the role of a pirate who completes voyages from different trading companies. The multiplayer game sees players explore an open world via a pirate ship from a first-person perspective. Players may encounter each other during their adventures, sometimes forming alliances, and sometimes going head-to-head.

The concept of Sea of Thieves was conceived in 2014. Rare was inspired by players of PC games such as Eve Online (2003), DayZ (2018), and Rust (2018), who used the game tools to create their own stories. Rare explored different settings, such as vampires and dinosaurs, before settling on a pirate theme inspired by the Pirates of the Caribbean films and The Goonies (1985). The game features a progression system that only unlocks cosmetic items as the development team wanted to encourage both casual and experienced players to play together. Rare departed from its reputation for secrecy during Sea of Thieves's development, inviting players to test early builds.

Sea of Thieves was released in March 2018 for Windows and Xbox One; it was one of the earliest first-party games released for Xbox Game Pass subscribers. It received mixed reviews; critics praised the ship combat, multiplayer, visuals, and physics, but criticized the progression, gameplay, and lack of content. Rare envisioned Sea of Thieves as a "game as a service" and has released numerous content updates after the initial release, which improved its reception. Sea of Thieves was a commercial success and became Microsoft's most successful original intellectual property of the eighth generation, attracting more than 40 million players by April 2024. A native Xbox Series X/S version of the game was released on 13 March 2024, and the game was released for the PlayStation 5 on 30 April 2024, making it Rare's first game to be released on a PlayStation console. Sea of Thieves was the final Rare title to be directed by veteran designer Gregg Mayles, before he departed the company in 2025. In June 2026, a live-action film adaptation was reported to be in development, with Destin Daniel Cretton producing.

== Gameplay ==
In this gameplay screenshot, the player is firing cannonballs at an opposing pirate ship, which is controlled by another group of players.

Sea of Thieves is a first-person perspective action-adventure game. At the beginning of the game, the player selects their procedurally generated player avatar and ventures out onto the ocean, completing voyages and quests for the various trading companies in-game. Completion of these voyages will reward the player with treasure, which can then be sold to trading company representatives at outposts to gain reputation. The game is set in a shared world, which means groups of players will encounter each other throughout their adventures, often engaging in naval battles and trying to steal treasure from each other.

=== Ship operation ===
Solo and duo players sail around in a nimble sloop while players playing in a group control a larger three-person brigantine or a four-person galleon cooperatively by assuming different roles, such as steering the ship, manning the cannons, navigating, boarding enemy ships, and scouting from the crow's nest. Players can save the loadout of the ship and customize the ship's hull, figurehead, sails and captain's quarters, as well as name their ship once they have sufficient gold to purchase one. Occasionally players may encounter hostile players who may attack them with cannonballs or board their ship. If areas under the deck take damage, water will flow in through holes and cause the ship to gradually fill with water. Players can patch up these holes with planks of wood and bail out water using buckets.

Alliances can be formed with other player crews. When a treasure item is sold by a member of an alliance, all other members receive gold and reputation points at half of the item's normal value. Ships in an alliance fly the same flag and are visible on the map tables on other ships in the alliance. Forming an alliance does not prevent players from attacking each other. If a player dies, there is a limited window of time during which they are able to be revived by crewmates or allied player crews. If they are not revived in time, they are sent to a ghost ship known as the Ferry of the Damned where they wait until they can respawn on their crew's ship. A competitive multiplayer mode named "Arena" was introduced in the Anniversary update, allowing up to six teams of players to compete against each other by gathering silver in smaller maps. Due to low player participation, this game mode was subsequently removed in a later update. "Arena" was replaced with a new multiplayer PvP mode called "Hourglass" in Season 8. A player-versus-environment mode named "Safer Seas" was introduced in December 2023.

=== Game objectives ===
Players can complete voyages offered by the game's multiple trading companies: Gold Hoarders, Order of Souls, the Merchant Alliance, Hunters call, Reapers bones, Athena's fortune, and the Smugglers League. In the quests offered by Gold Hoarders, players are given a treasure map or a riddle to locate a treasure chest. The voyages offered by the Order of Souls are combat challenges, in which players travel to islands specified by the quest to defeat waves of skeletons. The Merchant Alliance's missions require players to deliver animals or cargo to certain vendors within a limited time. Three other factions also exist. One of them, the Reaper's Bones, will pay for all kinds of treasures, and players can also give them special cursed treasures or emissary flags stolen from other ships. Players must deliver treasure to representatives of the quest-giving faction, though the player holding the chest is defenseless and it may be taken from them by other players. In the hunters call, players must hunt different animals and deliver them to a seatpost. For Athena's Fortune, there are legendary quests which are harder and take longer, but gives you larger rewards. Players must be level 50 in at least three of the factions to be able to even purchase these quests. Finally, the Smugglers League, you must deliver paintings and black powder barrels to the smugglers representatives. Selling the treasure earns players gold, which can be used to purchase cosmetic items. Pets, emotes, and further cosmetic items can also be purchased using real-world currency by accessing the Pirate Emporium store.

Doubloons, earned through completing commendations from the Bilge Rats, the fourth trading company that distributes quests, challenges, and cosmetics added to the game via post-launch updates, can be traded for cosmetics, gold, or reputation to the other factions. The Anniversary update added Tall Tales, which are a series of structured narrative missions. Selling treasures to any of the three main trading companies, as well as Reaper's Bones or Athena's Fortune, earns the player reputation points, which unlock more complicated quests from each faction and additional purchasable cosmetics. When players reach rank 50 with any three of the six trading companies, they will earn the title of "Pirate Legend", which grants players new cosmetic items and access to a pirate hideout, the Tavern of Legends, as well as a special trading company called Athena's Fortune.

=== Game setting ===
Players can freely explore the game's open world on their own or with other players. When exploring islands players can find various resources: food like bananas, coconuts, and mangos, which restore their health, as well as wood planks, firebombs, blunderbombs, and cannonballs. Rowboats can be used to carry cargo while avoiding potential hazards. There are eight weapons players can choose from, including cutlasses, pistols, blunderbusses, sniper rifles, throwing knives, double barrel pistols, blowpipes and harpoon guns, that can be used to defeat hostile enemies.

When players are sailing on the ocean, they may sometimes face adverse weather conditions such as thunderstorms, or encounter shipwrecks, messages in bottles, barrels, skeleton ships, ghost fleets, or two monsters: the megalodon and the kraken. Skull-shaped clouds indicate the locations of Skeleton Forts, which are raids that can be completed by players in the same server. Players can interact with each other using emotes and by speaking via an in-game text and voice system. They can also play musical instruments together and drink at taverns. The Anniversary update allows players to engage in leisure activities like fishing, hunting, and cooking.

== Development ==
Sea of Thieves was developed by the UK-based developer Rare. Almost all of Rare's 200 staff members worked on the game. The team began conceptualizing the game in 2014 and wanted to create a title where players could create stories together. The team took five months to create the game's playable prototype, named Athena, using the Unity game engine. After playing the prototype, Microsoft executives including Phil Spencer and Kudo Tsunoda agreed to green-light the game's development. Rare employees also provided the voices for all of the non-playable characters. Sea of Thieves marked Rare's shift from using its own proprietary engine to using Unreal Engine 4.

Prior to Sea of Thieves, Rare was often considered a secretive studio. Since Sea of Thieves is a multiplayer-focused game, the studio adopted a more transparent approach to the game's development to ensure that the game's content would resonate with players. The team allowed fans to take part in the game's development by joining the Insider's Program, which granted players access to an early build of the game. The program allowed Rare to experiment with different features while collecting players' feedback. The participants could also discuss with the developers in a private forum. More than 30,000 players joined the program. Through the program, Rare learned more about how players interact with each other and used the information to help the team make gameplay decisions; for instance, the team decided to include solo play after many players from the Insider's Program requested it.

=== Influences and setting ===
I love the idea of things happening in the world that literally can shape the ongoing fabric and lore of Sea of Thieves. The Black Beard of Sea of Thieves being a real player in a real crew with a real name - that's really hard to do if you've already painted everyone down a path you want them to go through.

— Joe Neate, executive producer of Rare

Studio director Craig Duncan described Sea of Thieves as the "friendliest" multiplayer game. While Rare is traditionally a console game developer, it realized how players from PC survival games like DayZ and Rust and simulation games such as Eve Online crafted their own stories by using the tools provided in the game. However, Rare remarked that these games are often very punishing in nature, and the team aspired to create a more light-hearted and accessible version of these games. Sea of Thieves was designed to be a "light canvass of a world" where players create their own stories. The game did not feature any narrative component at launch because the team felt that by offering players a structured narrative, they would only be playing a handcrafted experience. Joe Neate, the game's executive director, described the game as an "improv" comedy, and added that the game is about going "off-script". Rare shaped the world and the game's lore to reflect players' actions, including various easter eggs to celebrate their actions or achievements. The team believed that if a narrative campaign was included, incorporating players' actions into the game's lore would become difficult.

The company initially explored different settings and themes for the game, such as vampires and dinosaurs, though it eventually settled on the pirate theme because it matched the game's core concept of encouraging cooperation. Rare also saw less competition in the market for pirate-themed games. The pirate theme allows players to have the freedom to do what they want in the game's world and decide freely how they want to play and behave. The team looked at various sources for inspiration, including Pirates of the Caribbean and Black Sails. Designer Mike Chapman believed a lot of parallels can be drawn between Sea of Thieves and The Goonies, in which a group of friends bond together while they search for treasure, creating a journey that all of them would fondly remember. Neate added that the game's goal was to evoke "[a] sense of travel and exploration and discovery", and the team was inspired by the 2002 video game The Legend of Zelda: Wind Waker. The team implemented the "infinite pirate generator" instead of allowing players to customize their avatar as they feared that some players would create "abominations" that would not have fit the game's visual style. The game features a stylized visual style with hand-painted textures. Duncan added that the team chose this painted art style because they wanted it to be "timeless" and reflect the "joyful" and "delightful" game world.

=== Gameplay design ===
Rare noticed that in many multiplayer games, experienced players would focus on grinding for endgame content instead of playing with other players, while novice players would worry about their progression lagging significantly behind more experienced players. Therefore, the team introduced free ancient coins, gold, and doubloons, in which players would only earn cosmetic items as they achieved a higher rank; all items have the same attributes, so endgame content would not confer gameplay bonuses to experienced players. Rare thought this progression system would encourage more experienced players to assist novice players in completing voyages, and reduce the gap between the two experience levels. As a "shared world" adventure game, Rare opted to maintain the distance between each player group in a server rather than limiting the number of players a server can accommodate, so that players get to encounter other players regularly but not too frequently. Chapman estimated that a player will see another player-controlled ship every 15 minutes to half an hour.

The gameplay was designed to encourage player interactions and to test the player's soft skills. Players need to exercise their common sense in order to solve the challenges: for instance, players need to learn to read maps. To encourage players to develop these skills, the game does not feature a beginner's tutorial as the team wanted players to discover the game's mechanics by themselves. The team also intentionally avoided setting gameplay rules to encourage players to utilize their creativity. Despite this, Rare also included emergent gameplay in a more systematic manner by introducing shipwrecks and forts that players can discover. Chapman described these locations of interest as the "catalyst for stories" which draw different players together, fostering cooperation or competition. Being attacked by sea monsters also adds a layer of unpredictability to the game as these encounters are random. Due to the emergent gameplay, Sea of Thieves was also considered a "watchable and sharable game", and the team hoped that this would lure players who watched the game on video game live streaming platforms such as Twitch or Mixer to purchase it.

While the game allows solo play, the game is designed to be a multiplayer game in which players cooperate with each other. Chapman added that cooperative gameplay enhances the experience because "it makes sense in the world". The game does not feature any character class or specialization to encourage players to adopt different roles. The maximum crew size is four as Rare felt that if the group was too large, it would not reflect a sense of "intimate friendship" and players might splinter off and hinder inter-player communication. Neate described the game as a "friendship creation tool" and hoped that the game could become a platform where players can befriend strangers. Rare further added that they felt they had a responsibility to create a "positive online social space". Design changes were made to champion the concept of cooperation and friendship. For instance, players cannot hurt others in the same crew, and all rewards are shared equally among crew members. In one of the game's early prototypes, players in the same crew can betray each other, though the feature was scrapped because the team felt that the experience was "horrible". Neate added that the game provided "literally no reason or motivation to do anything other than cooperate". Rare incorporated several anti-toxicity measures. For instance, players can vote to lock a disruptive player into the brig.

== Release ==
Sea of Thieves was announced during Microsoft's press conference at E3 2015, with Duncan describing the game as the "most ambitious project" from Rare. Initially set to be released in 2017, the game was delayed to early 2018 to allow additional development time. Microsoft marketed the game extensively. Players who pre-ordered the game received the Black Dog Pack, which included exclusive cosmetic content and access to a closed beta. Players could also purchase a separate Sea of Thieves-themed Xbox wireless controller, and anyone who purchased the Xbox One X console from 18 to 24 March would receive a free digital copy of the game. Microsoft's Australian branch partnered with music band Captain Hellfire & The Wretched Brethren for a two-day event in which the pirate band sang different sea shanties requested by players. The program was broadcast via Facebook, Mixer, and Twitch from 24 to 25 March 2018. Microsoft also launched "The Quest", an alternate reality game where players needed to solve different riddles. The winners would receive one of four golden bananas (each valued at £20,000) as rewards. Rare also hosted a competition which tasked fans to create achievements for the game. Several stress tests and betas were released ahead of the game's official launch on 17 March. At launch, many players reported that they could not log into the game. Duncan said that Rare underestimated the server capacity as the number of people logging in to play the game during the launch period was unexpectedly high. Various fixes have been released to improve the game's online infrastructure. Sea of Thieves was released on Steam on 3 June 2020, and reached the "global top sellers" list in the same week. The game was released for the PlayStation 5 on 30 April 2024, as part of Microsoft's strategy to bring some of its games to rival platforms. It went on to become the platform's most downloaded game in North America in May 2024.

In addition to being a retail release, Sea of Thieves is an Xbox Play Anywhere title and the game was made available for Xbox Game Pass subscribers at launch. However, crossplay between PC and Xbox One players was made optional in February 2019 to ensure that all players feel that "they have a level playing field". On PC, the game was initially only available through Xbox Game Pass and Microsoft Store before Microsoft announced a release for Steam in April 2020. Players began to set rules, develop their own sets of challenges, and host their own events. To further encourage these players, Rare announced plans to incorporate private servers into the game.

=== Live service ===
Rare envisioned Sea of Thieves to be a "game as a service" and expected it to continue receiving updates for ten years. After the team had fixed most of the technical issues, they began looking at players' feedback and identified that players were complaining that there were not enough activities for them to participate in. Chapman stated that the team's strategy was to give players what they want, ensure that they fit within the Sea of Thieves universe, and "surprise" players. Rare has four teams of employees working in parallel to create the game's various expansions so that large content updates can be released frequently while ensuring that sufficient development time can be given to each team. The team hoped to release a large content update every six weeks to two months, and used "Bilge Rat Adventures", which are time-limited challenges, to fill the gap between each expansion. The ultimate goal was to make the game "as big and successful as it can be". The first major expansion, The Hungering Deep, was developed within two months. The second expansion, Cursed Sails, introduced skeleton ships controlled by artificial intelligence (AI). Despite being adamant about not doing so prior to the game's launch, the team decided to implement the feature as it was one of the biggest fan requests. The Anniversary update that added both Tall Tales and Arena mode was so massive that it was described as a "relaunch" for the game. All the expansions are free of charge as they did not want to divide the player base. Smuggler's Fortune, which was released in September 2019, added the Pirate Emporium, a new store that supports microtransactions. A new type of currency named "Ancient Coins" can be purchased from both the Xbox store and in-game. Rare released monthly updates and introduced new Tall Tales, new modes, new quests, and new features until December 2020.

In December 2020, Rare announced that they would move away from producing monthly updates for the game and instead, adopt the "battle pass" model popularised by games such as Fortnite and Fall Guys. Each season, which would last for about three months, would introduce new content or new ways of playing the game, with live events being hosted regularly. Rare also introduced the "Plunder Pass", an optional premium tier that grants players additional rewards which does have free options. The first season began in January 2021 and Season 2 began in April 2021. Rare also announced that they would stop updating the Arena mode as the vast majority of the players spent their time playing the cooperative adventure mode. Arena mode was shut down in March 2022 after an announcement earlier in the year. Rare described 2022 as the "biggest year yet" for Sea of Thieves, and the studio planned to add more features, including Adventures, which are story-driven live events that last for around two weeks, and Mysteries, which would unfold over the course of several months. Each adventure was designed as a chapter in a long story, as the team hoped that these live events can "bring a sense of continual danger to the world". Mysteries were inspired by alternate reality games, in which hints would be given to the player both in and out of the game. In July 2025, following layoffs at Rare that cancelled its upcoming game Everwild, the studio reaffirmed its commitment to Sea of Thieves. Rare also changed the release format for each season, rolling out content gradually each month instead of delivering it all at launch. It also announced that it will launch a subscription service that allow players to host custom servers. In June 2026, Rare introduced the "Custom Seas" update, adding a level editor where players can create custom modes.

Sea of Thieves saw frequent collaborations with other Microsoft franchises. The Bird and Bear Figurehead, based on Rare's own Banjo-Kazooie series, was released in July 2018. Ships based on the Halo series and the Gears of War franchise were released in June and November 2019 respectively, as well as a ship set based on Ori and the Will of the Wisps released in March 2020. Rare also expanded Sea of Thieves to other media. It had partnered with Mongoose Publishing to release a tabletop game titled Sea of Thieves Roleplaying Game in October 2019. Titan Comics debuted a comic series written by Jeremy Whitley in March 2018. Titan Books also worked with Rare to publish an art book named Tales from the Sea of Thieves. A free expansion titled A Pirate's Life, which is based on Disney's Pirates of the Caribbean franchise, was released on 22 June 2021, and spans five Tall Tales. The expansion was in development for about two years. A second free expansion titled The Legend of Monkey Island, based on Lucasfilm Games' Monkey Island series, was released on 20 July 2023, and spans three Tall Tales. A cosmetic set based on the Destiny series was released in March 2025.

== Reception ==
=== Critical reception ===
Reception

Aggregate score
Aggregator	Score
Metacritic	PC: 67/100; XONE: 69/100; PS5: 81/100

Review scores
Publication	Score
Destructoid	6.5/10
Eurogamer	Recommended
Game Informer	7/10
GameRevolution	2.5/5
GameSpot	6/10
GamesRadar+	3.5/5
IGN	8/10 (2020)
PC Gamer (US)	72/100
Polygon	6.5/10

Sea of Thieves received "mixed or average" reviews from critics according to review aggregator website Metacritic. Most critics agreed that the game had potential to be successful but lamented that the game suffered from a lack of content and questioned Rare's decision to release it as a full-priced product. The game's graphics and the game physics also received praise.

The multiplayer portion of the game was well received. Jordan Devore from Destructoid noted that with a full crew, the game could get chaotic and situations could turn volatile very quickly. He added that cooperation with strangers could create unforgettable experiences for players which could be deeply satisfying. Peter Brown from GameSpot also enjoyed coordinating with other players and goofing around, though he remarked that some players were trolling others which caused the experience to be frustrating. Kyle Hilliard from Game Informer stated that each session "results in a story" due to the emergent gameplay, and praised Rare for successfully creating an excellent "pirate simulator" and "manufacturing a digital playground that is fun to explore". Sam Loveridge from GamesRadar likewise commented that the game is "an anecdote generator at its very best" due to its emergent storytelling. Brandin Tyrrel from IGN stated that "Sea of Thieves works well when treated like a chat room or a party game, where it serves as catalyst for having a good time with the people you're with".

The gameplay received generally negative reviews. Devore felt that the quests were repetitive and that the world did not have a lot of interesting things to do. Paul Tamburro from Game Revolution agreed, remarking that the quests had little variety and did not allow room for creativity. While he praised the sandbox format, he felt that there were not enough secrets or stories players could discover in the world. Loveridge called the voyages "elaborated fetch quests". He lamented that there was no option to turn off PvP and players could not customize their own characters. Russ Frushtick from Polygon remarked that misbehaving players may make the experience frustrating because PvP could never be disabled. However, he remarked that the game offered no incentive for players who wanted to engage in PvP combat. Hilliard felt that the game did not have enough content to keep players engaged, and remarked that the combat felt bland. Many critics commented that players would not be motivated to complete quests because only cosmetic items are unlocked. Tyrrel praised the ship combat, though he felt that the respawn system was too forgiving. Christian Donlan from Eurogamer likewise called the ship combat "thrilling" and the general combat "crunchy, pleasantly basic". Tyler Wilde from PC Gamer liked exploring the shipwrecks, believing that exploration evokes a sense of discovery, though he commented that he wished more emergent events would happen in the ocean. Solo play received mixed opinions. Some critics thought that it was more difficult, boring, and maddening, while some remarked that it was entertaining, satisfying, and relaxing.

After a year of updates, the game received more positive reviews from critics. Following the Anniversary update, IGN stated that players should give the game a second chance and that it was the "perfect time" to return to the game. One of its writers, David Jagneaux, praised the Tall Tales and its riddles in his second review, which he described as "brain teasers that really challenge [player's] detective skills". In his summary, he wrote that the game is a "pirate fantasy sandbox with an enormous amount of things to do, made unpredictable and exciting by the addition of other players". Nicole Carpenter from Polygon praised the post-launch updates for making the title more "curated" with more structure and direction. The game also received PC Gamer's Best Ongoing Game 2019 award, and was listed by Gameindustry.biz as one of their Games of the Year in 2019.

=== Commercial performance ===
Sea of Thieves was a commercial success, attracting more than 1 million players two days after it released. During its week of release, it was the best-selling retail game in the UK, sixth best-selling in Switzerland, and it became the second best-selling game in the US in March 2018 behind Far Cry 5. On 28 March 2018, Microsoft declared the game as the fastest-selling new IP released for the Xbox One. Rare attributed the game's success to the title releasing for Xbox Game Pass subscribers at launch, which enabled the game to achieve Rare's sales target for three months in a single day. Game Pass contributed to half of the game's sales, though Microsoft added that the game also sold well in both retail and digital formats. The game passed five million players in August 2018. In January 2020, Rare declared the game was "the most successful IP [Microsoft has] released in the generation", with it amassing more than 10 million players. In addition to good sales, Sea of Thieves was also popular with viewers, with the title being ranked as one of the most watched titles on Twitch in January 2019 following the Shrouded Spoils update.

The game would launch on Steam on 3 June 2020. By July 2020, Sea of Thieves would top 15 million players, including 1 million units sold on Steam and over 3.3 million players logging in during June 2020. The total number of players would continue to rise, reaching 20 million players by March 2021. During the month of June 2021, following the release of the Pirates of the Caribbean crossover A Pirate's Life content update, 4.8 million players logged in, setting a new record. In October 2021, Sea of Thieves had reached 25 million players. On Steam, 5 million units have been sold as of December 2021. During the 2022 Xbox/Bethesda Games Showcase, a trailer for Sea of Thieves Season 7, the game had reached over 30 million players. In April 2024, Sea of Thieves reached 40 million players.

=== Controversy ===
In May 2026, Rare's community management team became the centre of a controversy over the promotion of a player known as Bruno (known online as 'heslashthem') to Boatswain, a community ambassador role. Several players online alleged that Bruno had been engaging in sexual behaviours towards minors within the Sea of Thieves community, including soliciting CSAM from minors, with the community management team allegedly dismissing previous incidents and signs in the lead up through several documents referred to as "The Bruno Files", which were published and spread around social media. In the immediate aftermath, Bruno's account was banned from Sea of Thieves, whilst several large content creators for the game announced that they were stepping away from the game's Partner Program as a result and demanded further action be taken by Rare. On 18 May, Rare announced via a statement posted online that they would be discontinuing the Boatswain Program with immediate effect, and announced that they would launch an internal investigation into the incident.

=== Awards ===
Year	Award	Category	Result	Ref.
2016	Game Critics Awards	Best of Show	Nominated	
2016	Game Critics Awards	Best Original Game	Nominated	
2016	Game Critics Awards	Best Online Multiplayer	Nominated	
2016	Gamescom 2016	Best Xbox One Game	Won	
2016	Gamescom 2016	Best Social/Online Game	Nominated	
2016	Gamescom 2016	Best Multiplayer Game	Won	
2016	Golden Joystick Awards	Most Wanted Game	Nominated	
2017	Game Critics Awards	Best Original Game	Nominated	
2017	Game Critics Awards	Best Online Multiplayer	Nominated	
2017	Golden Joystick Awards	Most Wanted Game	Nominated	
2018	Develop Awards	Animation	Nominated	
2018	Develop Awards	Visual Design	Nominated	
2018	Develop Awards	Music Design	Nominated	
2018	Develop Awards	Sound Design	Nominated	
2018	Develop Awards	Gameplay Innovation	Nominated	
2018	The Independent Game Developers' Association Awards	Best Action and Adventure Game	Nominated	
2018	The Independent Game Developers' Association Awards	Creativity Award	Nominated	
2018	The Independent Game Developers' Association Awards	Best Audio Design	Nominated	
2018	The Independent Game Developers' Association Awards	Visual Design	Won	
2018	Golden Joystick Awards	Best Audio Design	Nominated	
2018	Golden Joystick Awards	Best Co-operative Game	Nominated	
2018	Golden Joystick Awards	Xbox Game of the Year	Nominated	
2018	The Game Awards 2018	Best Multiplayer Game	Nominated	
2019	22nd Annual D.I.C.E. Awards	Online Game of the Year	Nominated	
2019	15th British Academy Games Awards	Evolving Game	Nominated	
2019	15th British Academy Games Awards	Multiplayer	Nominated	
2019	Ivor Novello Awards	Best Original Video Game Score	Won	
2019	The Independent Game Developers' Association Awards	Best Social Game	Nominated	
2019	Golden Joystick Awards	Best Game Expansion (Anniversary Update)	Nominated	
2021	17th British Academy Games Awards	Evolving Game	Won	
2025	21st British Academy Games Awards	Evolving Game	Nominated	
