= The Room (video game) =

2012 video game

- Developer: Fireproof Games
- Publishers: Fireproof Games; Team17 (Nintendo Switch)
- Designers: Robert Dodd; Mark Hamilton
- Writer: Oliver Reid-Smith
- Composer: David Newby
- Engine: Unity
- Platforms: iOS, Android, Microsoft Windows, Nintendo Switch
- Release: iOS: WW: 12 September 2012; Android: WW: 23 March 2013; Microsoft Windows: WW: 28 July 2014; Nintendo Switch: WW: 18 October 2018
- Genre: Puzzle
- Mode: Single-player

The Room is a 2012 puzzle video game developed by Fireproof Games. The game was originally developed for the iOS platform and released in 12 September 2012. The Android version debuted as part of a Humble Bundle in March 2013 and was subsequently released on Google Play. A free expansion for the title was released in August 2013. An enhanced version of the game was released for Microsoft Windows in July 2014, and for the Nintendo Switch in October 2018.

At the time of The Room's creation, Fireproof had been providing art assets for other publishers, and The Room reflects the studio's first attempt to make their own game, but with limited finances, focused on a mobile title with the goal of taking advantage of the platform's unique interface aspects. The Room presents the player with a series of strange puzzle boxes that feature a number of physical mechanisms. The player is challenged to figure out how to open each one – typically by undoing a series of locks – to access another puzzle box within it. The game uses a variety of motions enabled by mobile device touchscreens to simulate actions in real life, such as looking around the device, turning keys, and activating switches. Through the game, a story involving the research of an unnamed person into the fifth classical element, "null," which is described in notes found through the various box puzzles.

The Room has received positive reception, and the iOS version received several awards. It is considered among the greatest mobile games of all time. The game has sold more than 6.5 million copies. Fireproof Games have since released four sequels to The Room, with total collective sales of 11.5 million by 2016.

== Gameplay ==
A core puzzle element of The Room is a lens that allows the player to see secrets otherwise hidden. Here, the player must manipulate the camera view to match up the hidden number fragments to obtain a combination code.

The Room is a three-dimensional puzzle game. The game has a minimal story, in which the player is told by letters of a mysterious box in a room in a house; as the player solves the puzzles around the box, more notes from the same author – one who previously had solved the mystery of the box – are found, describing the box's use of an ethereal material called "Null", as well as showing the author slowly descending into madness.

On starting the game, the player is presented with the first of four puzzle boxes. The first box is offered as a tutorial to the game's controls, which demonstrate how to move around the box and interact with the features of the box. The player has a small inventory for items like keys found in compartments in the box. A key inventory element is a special lens that, in-game, allows the player to see things made from the Null element that compose parts of the box. The lens can generally be equipped at any time to see these secrets, often requiring the player to manipulate the view to align secrets into a coherent symbol. The goal is to fully unlock each puzzle box, extracting a smaller but increasingly complex box within it.

== Development ==
Fireproof Games is a British development firm born out from six developers that had been working at Criterion Games on the Burnout racing series; together they decided to quit to form their own small team to provide outsourceable artwork to other developers. Their work was included in both LittleBigPlanet games, DJ Hero, and other racing titles like Split/Second and Blur. They desired to get into developing their own game around 2012, but at that time, they found the costs of developing for a console or personal computer title were too high, and opted to go into mobile gaming which was cheaper to develop for; they also recognized that many mobile games developed by teams with experience in consoles and computers did not make great mobile games, often simply porting or cloning existing titles, and set out to prove that it was possible to make a good mobile game, something that "fit for this piece of hardware, for this audience", according to Fireproof Games cofounder Barry Meade. With The Room, the goal was "to make the best iOS game we could, not just try to make a big console game for iOS", according to Meade. They wanted to emphasise the use of the touchscreen of mobile devices in its own unique way, similar to the success of Cut the Rope and Angry Birds. At the same time, they wanted to create a game that would be immersive for the player, and had devised the appropriate touch controls to provide tactile responses that worked alongside their art and music assets to help towards this.

Fireproof hired a programmer in January 2012 to create their own title, The Room; during its development, the game only took two of Fireproof's team, the rest of the company continuing to work on other outsourcing jobs. The game was developed in the Unity game engine, mostly due to its very low costs, a financial limitation Fireproof had at the time. Total development costs for the initial iPad version were estimated to be £160,000. They early on hit on the idea of Asian puzzle boxes, which may have had hundreds of steps to be performed to open while having a degree of art and beauty in their creation. Meade compared this to an early successful mobile title, Zen Bound, which, while it was a simple game without any challenge, "was really pleasant and beautiful to look at", according to Meade. Initially planning on calling the game Puzzle Box, they crafted a playable demonstration within a few weeks of the idea, and then built out from there. To achieve the tactile nature they wanted for the game, they made sure to include a physics engine so that all the moving parts of each puzzle had some type of weight, as Meade felt that simulated physical responses to direct touchscreen controls, "you've automatically wiped out this massive barrier to entry that people have", in contrast to using a game pad or controller. The name "The Room" came from Meade's time at Media Molecule, where "The Room" was a codename of an unused tech demo.

The game was initially created for Apple's iPad (compatible with iPad 2 upwards) and released in September 2012. Fireproof also ported the game to work on the Apple iPhone 4S and newer models; however, at the time of its release, there was no way to indicate to users of the Apple App Store that the game would not work on the iPhone 4. For this reason, they created a free-to-play version, The Room Pocket on 3 December 2012, which included the first puzzle of The Room and the option to buy the rest of the game so that they would not draw ire of iPhone 4 users. Meade said that as of 2018 The Room Pocket had more sales than The Room.

An Android version of The Room was created for mobile devices as part of the Humble Mobile Bundle which was released on 26 March 2013. A free expansion to The Room was released in August 2013 which updated the game with a new level and links the end of the first game to the sequel. Fireproof developed a Microsoft Windows version that was released on 28 July 2014, providing support for mouse controls. The Windows version was only planned once they had found the game successful on mobile, and it had to be rebuilt from the ground up, requiring a larger team, about half of their 14-person staff at the time, with a risk of how popular this version would be.

A version of The Room was released for the Nintendo Switch on 18 October 2018 with publishing support of Team17, making its console debut. The game supports the same touchscreen controls from the mobile game, but uses the Switch's Joy-Con for playing the game in television mode. The Switch version includes improved graphics and the original game's DLC.

== Reception ==
Reception

Aggregate score
Aggregator	Score
Metacritic	iOS: 88/100; PC: 73/100; Switch: 80/100

Review scores
Publication	Score
Edge	iOS: 4/5
Pocket Gamer	iOS: 9/10
TouchArcade	iOS: 4/5
MacLife	iOS: 9.0/10
Slant Magazine	PC: 2/5
Digitally Downloaded	PC: 4/5

The Room was met with "generally favorable reviews" for the iOS and Nintendo Switch, and "mixed or average" for PC, according to Metacritic.

=== Sales ===
Fireproof Games broke even on the first week of release for the iPad version, allowing them to plan for the expansions and sequels, and to start to consider other projects. As of March 2013, The Room on iPad has sold over 1.4 million copies and near its initial release, ranked as one of the top-selling games on several iOS lists. The free pocket version has been downloaded over 2.4 million times. By October 2016, The Room has sold more than 6.5 million units, and collectively, the three games in the series have sold more than 11.5 million copies.

=== Awards ===
Upon its release The Room was featured as Apple's Editors choice across the world, going on to receive the coveted "Apple iPad Game of the Year 2012" and the BAFTA for best British video game. It won the following awards:

Date	Award	Category	Ref.
2012	Apple Inc	iPad Game of the Year	
2012	BAFTA	Best British Game	
2012	Game Developers Choice Awards	Best Handheld/Mobile Game	
2012	The International Mobile Game Awards	Excellence in Visuals	
2012	TIGA	Best Game Design	
2012	New York Video Game Critics Circle Awards	Best Mobile/iOS Game	
2012	JayisGames.com	Best Mobile Puzzle Game	
2012	Gamezebo	Best iPad Game	
2012	Cnet Aus	Best Mobile Game	

== Sequels ==
The Room was followed by several sequels: The Room Two, was released on iTunes on 12 December 2013 and on Steam.

In 2014, Fireproof Games announced a third title, The Room Three which was released for mobile platforms in November 2015 and on Steam.

A fourth game, The Room: Old Sins, was released on 25 January 2018. It was released on Steam on 11 February 2021.

A spin-off title, The Room VR: A Dark Matter was released exclusively for VR platforms on 26 March 2020.
