= Yoku's Island Express =

2018 video game

- Cover art, depicting the protagonist, Yoku
- Developer: Villa Gorilla
- Publisher: Team17
- Designer: Linus Larsson
- Programmer: Jens Andersson
- Artist: Mattias Snygg
- Composer: Jesse Harlin
- Platforms: Windows; Nintendo Switch; PlayStation 4; Xbox One; Amazon Luna
- Release: Windows, Switch, PS4, Xbox One; 29 May 2018; Amazon Luna; 20 October 2020
- Genres: pinball, Metroidvania
- Mode: Single-player

Yoku's Island Express is a platform pinball adventure game developed by Swedish studio Villa Gorilla and published by Team17. The studio's debut project, the game was released in May 2018 for Windows, Nintendo Switch, PlayStation 4, and Xbox One. A version was released for Amazon Luna in October 2020.

In Yoku's Island Express, players control Yoku, a dung beetle, who becomes a postmaster as he arrives at a fictional island of Mokumana. The player is tasked with saving the island from a looming calamity, as the island's deity figure is attacked.

== Gameplay ==
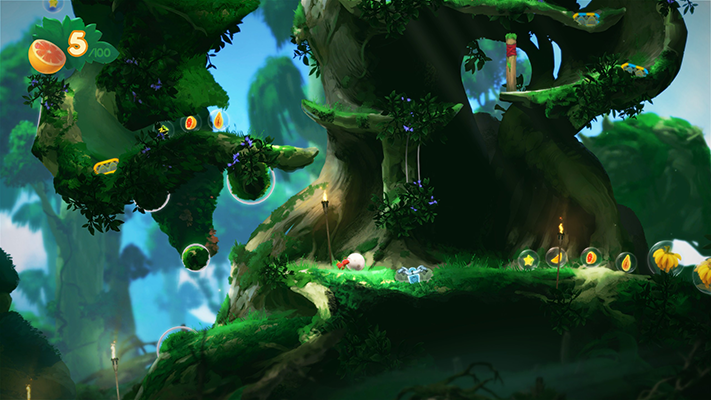
Gameplay screenshot

The gameplay of Yoku's Island Express consists mainly of side-scrolling platforming. The player can move Yoku left and right, but unlike most platform games, they can't jump. Instead, the player uses pinball paddles (flippers) placed throughout the map to launch a ball attached to Yoku into the air, pulling Yoku with it. Yoku's Island Express takes place on a Metroidvania-style open-world island with many bumpers, tracks and ramps to utilise the pinball mechanics.

A large part of the story is told through the art and environment.

== Development ==
Villa Gorilla was founded in Stockholm, Sweden in 2013 by Jens Andersson and Mattias Snygg. They wanted to make a game in one year, choosing to "make a game about a ball" as they did not have an animator. Eventually, they started calling their project an "open-world pinball game".

The developers created a proprietary game engine suited for the needs of their project.

After play testing an earlier version of the game, at the time called Pinball Stories, the developers realized they had focused too much on the pinball aspect. They subsequently decided it should be an "adventure game with pinball mechanics, rather than a pinball game with adventure elements". During this change, a planned release for iOS was dropped.

Yoku's Island Express was announced on 20 February 2017. On 16 May 2017, it was announced that Team17 would be the game's publisher. Yoku's Island Express was released worldwide on 29 May 2018. The game was released for Amazon Luna on 20 October 2020.

In 2021, a randomize mode was added which shuffled items in the game.

== Reception ==
Reception

Aggregate score
Aggregator	Score
Metacritic	NS: 82/100; PC: 84/100; PS4: 83/100; XONE: 83/100

Review scores
Publication	Score
Destructoid	9/10
Eurogamer	Recommended
GameSpot	9/10
IGN	8/10
Nintendo Life	9/10

Yoku's Island Express received "generally favorable" reviews, according to review aggregator Metacritic.

Critics called Yoku's Island Express "unique". and "ingenious" They praised how the developers managed to combine several genres, with GameSpot's Alexander Pan stating "Yoku's Island Express takes two unlikely genres and combines them into one playful, natural experience".

Reviewers criticised the occasional retreading or backtracking in the game's world as sometimes being tedious or even causing frustration. Jon Mundy of Nintendo Life stated that "figuring out exactly how to get from A to B in the early to mid-game stretch can feel like groping around in the dark". Critics who reviewed the Nintendo Switch version complained about the in-game map being hard to read in handheld mode.

The game was nominated for "Best Debut Indie Game" at The Game Awards 2018, and for the Central Park Children's Zoo Award for Best Kids Game at the New York Game Awards, and won the award for "Game, Original Family" at the National Academy of Video Game Trade Reviewers Awards; it was also nominated for "Best Debut" with Villa Gorilla at the Game Developers Choice Awards, and for "Best Sound Design for an Indie Game" at the 2019 G.A.N.G. Awards, and won the award for "Debut Game" at the 15th British Academy Games Awards, whereas its other nomination was for "Family". In addition, it was nominated for "Best Visual Art", "Best Game Design", and "Best Original IP" at the Develop:Star Awards, and for "Best Arcade Game" at The Independent Game Developers' Association Awards 2019.
