= The Roottrees are Dead =

2023 video game

- Steam version digital art
- Developers: Jeremy Johnston, Robin Ward
- Artist: Henning Ludvigsen
- Engine: Unity (original); Godot (remastered)
- Platforms: Linux (including SteamOS), macOS, Microsoft Windows
- Release: Windows; 8 Nov 2023; Remastered: Steam; 15 Jan 2025
- Genre: Puzzle
- Mode: Single-player

The Roottrees are Dead is a 2023 video game developed and published by Jeremy Johnston. The game is a detective puzzle game in which the player is required to undertake research to fill the incomplete Roottree family tree. Originally released as a browser game, a 2025 remaster of the game was released by developer Robin Ward in collaboration with Johnston. The remaster features an updated design and visual presentation, as well as an additional case, called Roottreemania, which extends the narrative of the original game.

== Gameplay ==
The game is a puzzle game in which the player is tasked to fill in the names, pictures and occupations of characters on a family tree, represented on an evidence board. In order to uncover the identities of characters on the family tree and infer their relationships, the player must inspect photographs and attached notes, and use a web browser on their in-game computer to search for relevant names or concepts. Once the player has correctly guessed the entries in a stage, they are locked onto the screen and cannot be changed. Correct optional names and portraits are also locked and removed from the pool of names. An 'Intuition' tab provides a list of items of evidence organised by the number of clues contained within the evidence. A list of Notable Roottrees is also provided to the player, listing family members which are more easily searchable on the web browser and marked with stars on the family tree.

== Plot ==
The game takes place in Butler County, Pennsylvania. In December 1998, the private jet of the Roottree family crashes in a winter storm, leading to the deaths of Carl Roottree and his three daughters, the Roottree Sisters. The Roottrees are the owners of the Roottree Candy Company, a company founded generations before by Carl's great-grandfather Elias Roottree in Butler County, Pennsylvania. Due to an agreement called the Clanced Trust, only blood relatives are eligible to partake in the Roottree inheritance. The player is an investigator approached by a shadowy woman asked to verify the relations of all claimants to the Roottree inheritance, offering a substantial reward if the family tree is completed. As the player progresses their work, the woman reveals she is a Roottree, and is making plans to publish a book on the family she expects the rest of the family will disapprove of. Upon completion of the family tree, the woman reveals herself to be Samantha Madsen, an illegitimate Roottree descendant. Samantha reveals that she was raised by John Miller and Edward Clancy Roottree, a twin brother removed from the family bloodline by the founder Elias Roottree due to his gay relationship. Samantha's book aims to reveal Elias' conduct and prove that Samantha's daughter and granddaughters are equal heirs to the Roottree inheritance, as well as establish her adoptive father's place in the family. Following the conclusion of the game, Samantha's book is published to mixed reviews and the Roottrees fade from media attention.

=== Roottreemania expansion ===
In the wake of Samantha's book, a rapper named Felix Fellowes publicly claims to be another "secret Roottree". After his claim is backed up by the newly available DNA testing technology, there is a wave of public attention on the subject and the possibility of further unknown, illegitimate children. Due to the "blood relative" wording in the Clanced Trust terms, these heirs are entitled to a share of the family fortune. Around the same time, an anonymous woman goes public claiming that her child was also fathered by Guy Hudson, who was the company president in the late 1970s and early 1980s. The media hype begins to fade after the anonymous woman's claim is disproved through a DNA test.

In August 1999, eight months after the main plot, the new company president Clark Rafferty tasks the player with investigating potential hidden blood relatives entitled to a part of the Roottree fortune. The player discovers descendants resulting from the affairs of several prominent Roottrees. In particular this includes many illegitimate children of Hudson, fathered during his presidency. While initially appearing that Hudson was frequently cheating on his wife Patricia, it is revealed that their relationship was a lavender marriage, designed to allow both of them to have consensual non-monogamous relationships with various women. By the end of the investigation, it is revealed that Fellowes' claim was fabricated: he and the company's lawyer were childhood friends and together falsified DNA evidence to claim a portion of the Roottree fortune. However, the anonymous woman's claim proves genuine, and the investigation ultimately uncovers that her child was one of six children secretly fathered by Hudson.

== Development ==
In 2023, The Roottrees are Dead was created for a Global Game Jam by Jeremy Johnston in under a week. The art for the game was generated using Midjourney, a generative artificial intelligence (AI) program. Johnston then spent eleven months building on the game and released it on browsers, hosted on itch.io. Johnston released the game for free due to the use of AI generated art, but included a donation link that made $2,000-$3,000 from over 10,000 players.

Johnston was later contacted by Robin Ward, who had enjoyed The Roottrees are Dead, to create a remastered version of the game without AI generated art, to which Johnston agreed. Ward and Johnston both were opposed to selling a game with AI artwork. Furthermore, Steam had forbidden the sale of games using generative AI on their storefront at the time. Ward reprogrammed the game and hired illustrator Henning Ludvigsen to replace the AI generated art. Ludvigsen used the original art as reference, while also doing research into the time periods that the art was meant to evoke. The remastered version of the game was released on Steam in January 2025, and includes Roottreemania, an additional case following the original story.

== Reception ==
Reception

Aggregate score
Aggregator	Score
Metacritic	87%

Review scores
Publication	Score
Game Informer	9.25/10
PC Gamer (UK)	86%
PC Gamer (US)	87%
Game Rant	7/10
Siliconera	9/10
Softpedia	4/5
Vice	Recommended

The Roottrees are Dead received "generally favorable" reviews, according to review aggregator Metacritic. Many critics praised the game's detective gameplay. Describing the game as an "exceptional detective game", PC Gamer UK wrote that the game had a "riveting story" anchored around the "interesting" Roottree family, and that the gameplay was "difficult and time-consuming, but extremely satisfying". Reviewers expressed reservations about the game's use of generative art, but PC Gamer UK found them to help "breath a sense of life" into the family. William Hughes of The A.V. Club considered the game to be a "good mystery" and "polished" in its execution, finding the core gameplay of understanding the Roottree family background to be a "pleasure" and reminiscent of the game The Return of the Obra Dinn. The website later named The Roottrees are Dead as the fifth-best game of 2023, describing it as "refreshing" and "one of the most concentrated doses of gaming joy we received all year".

== Legacy ==
The game inspired William Rous to develop the horror mystery title Type Help (2025). The game was also picked up by Evil Trout Inc. and was remade in a similar fashion, largely funded by the money from the commercial version of The Roottrees are Dead. Jeremy Johnston, the original designer for Roottrees, joined Evil Trout and assisted on the game. It released in 2026 as The Incident at Galley House.
