= Room =

Distinguishable space within a building or other structure

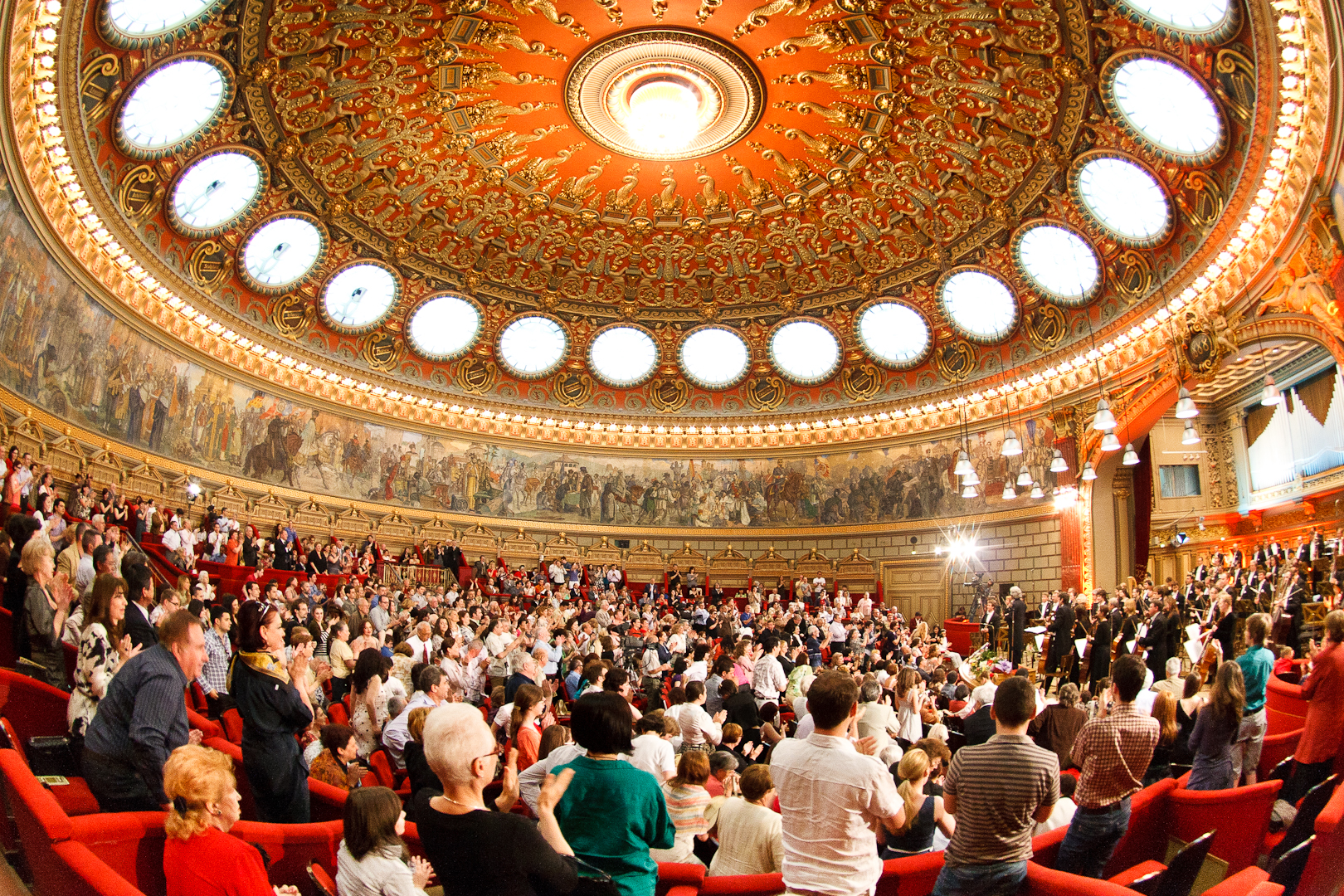
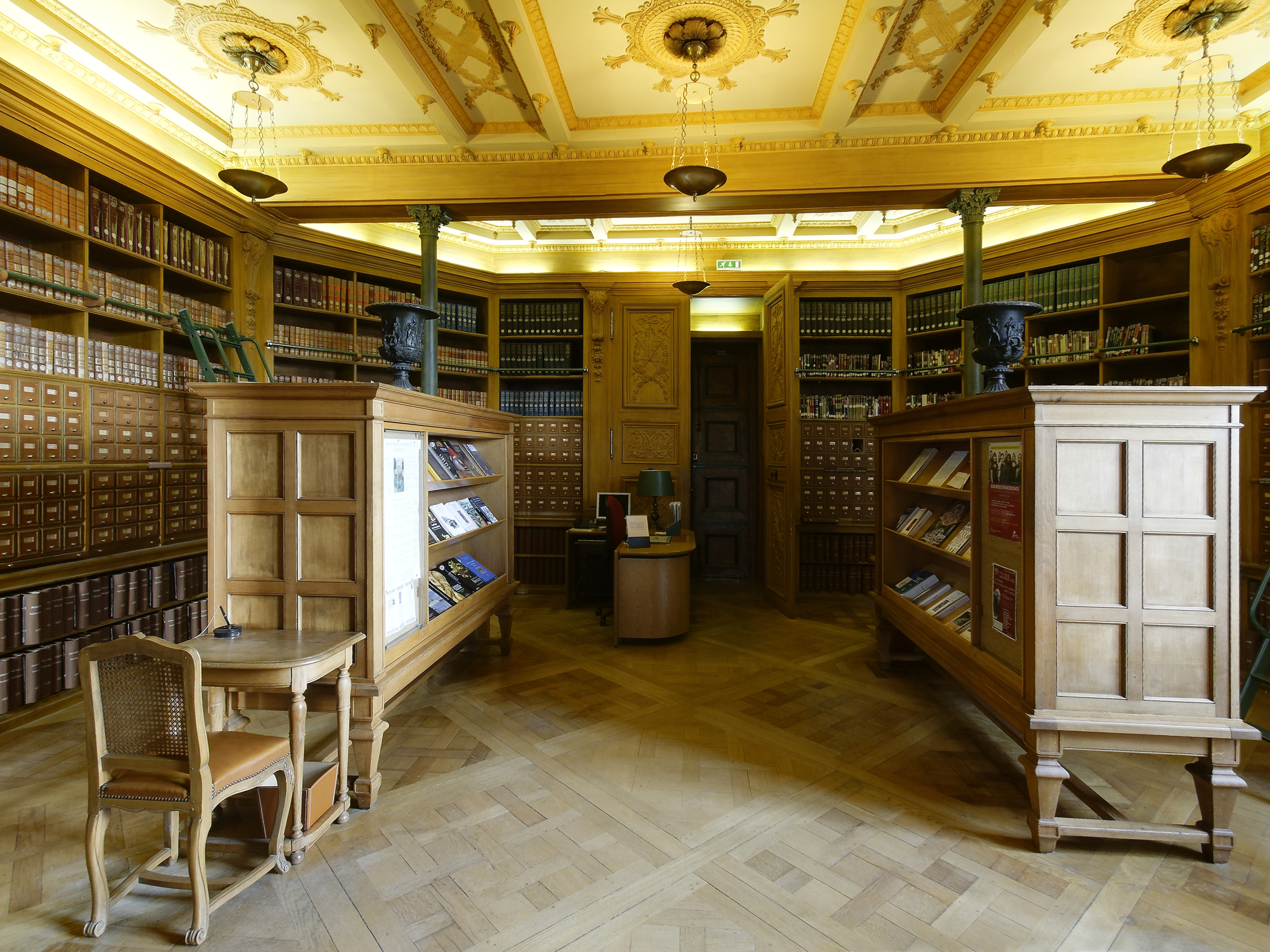
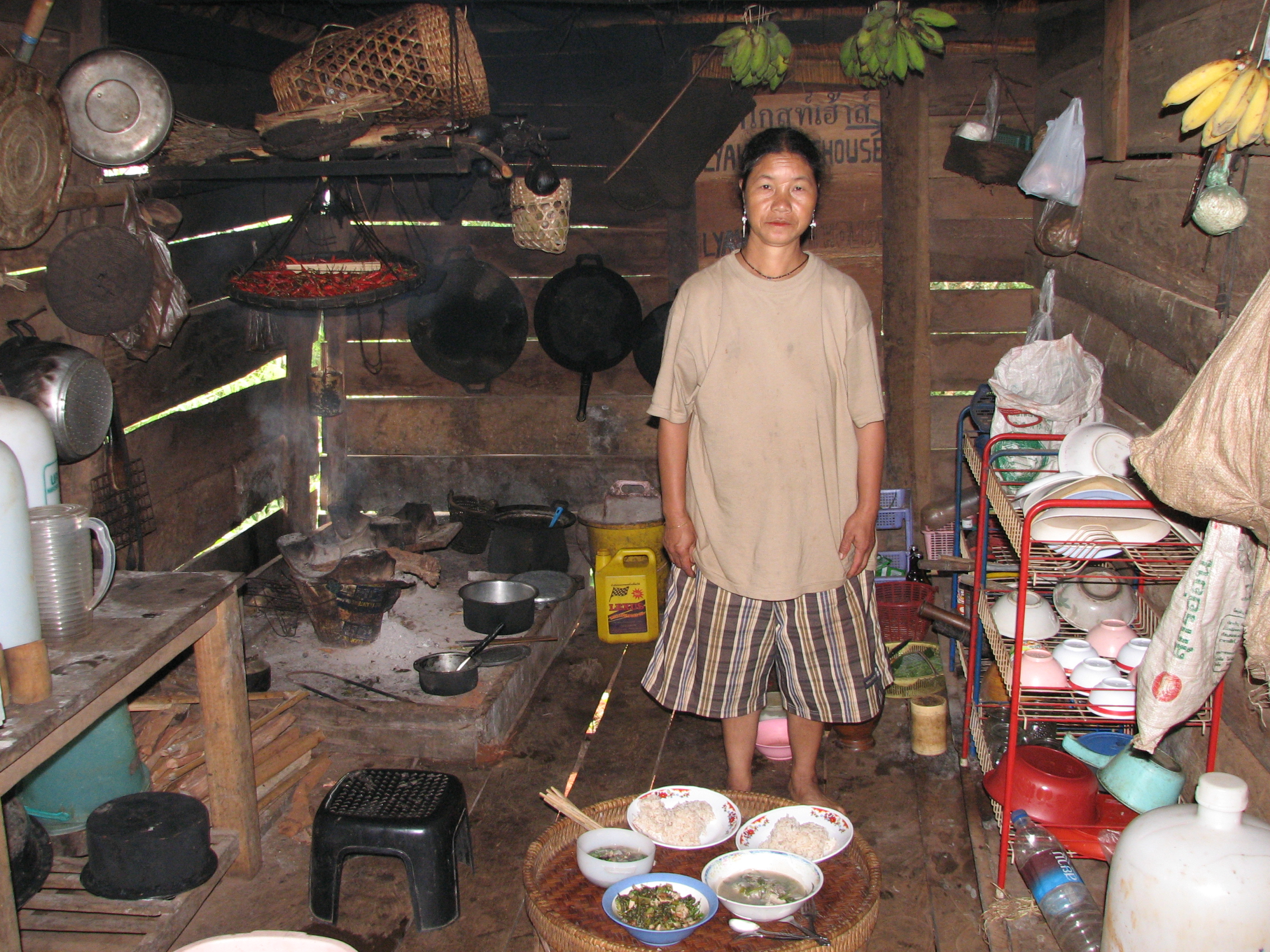
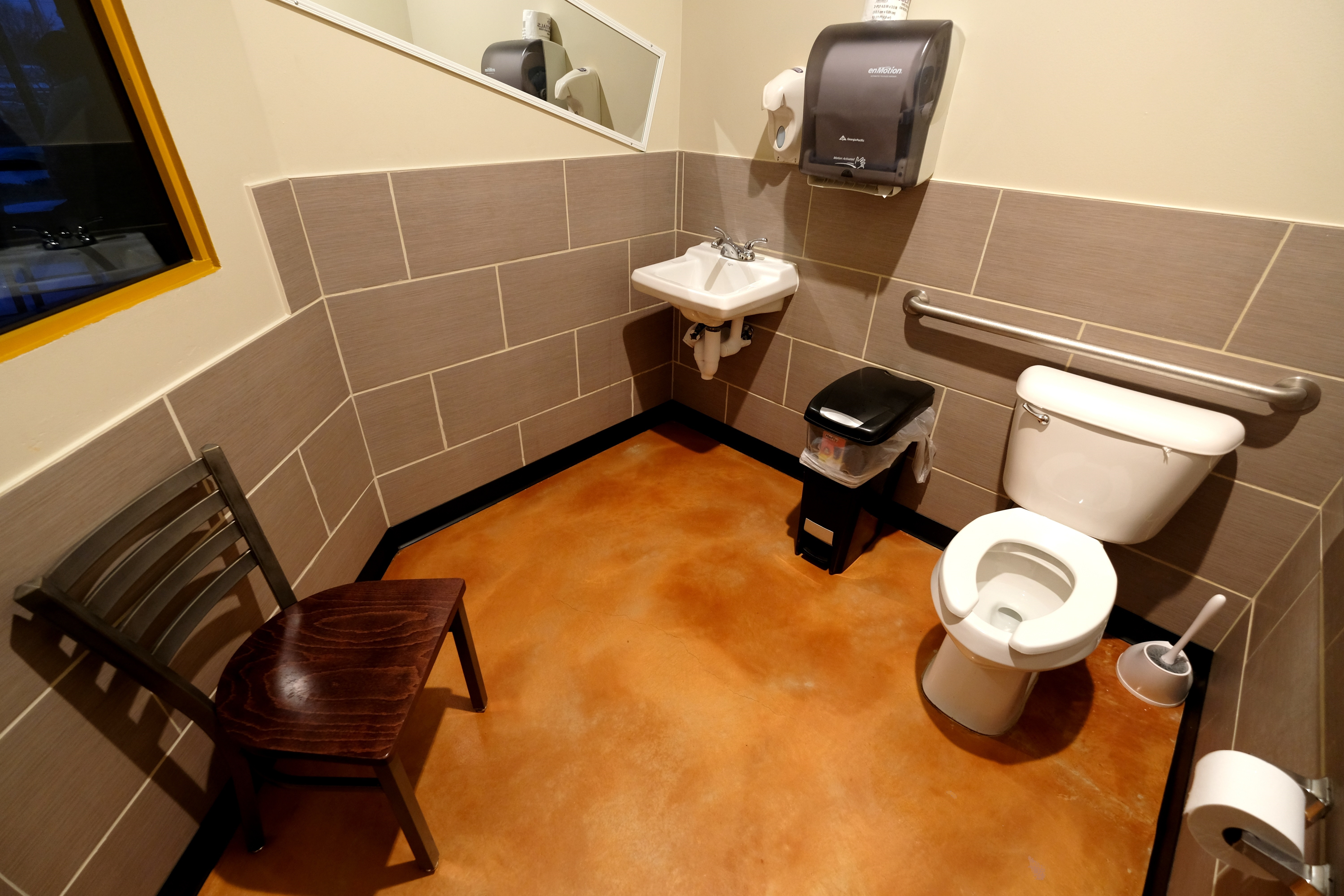
Various examples of rooms and interiors. Clockwise from top left: the Romanian Athenaeum concert hall in Bucharest; the catalog room of the Bibliothèque Mazarine in Paris; a restaurant bathroom in Oklahoma; and a kitchen in Thailand.

A room is any enclosed space within a structure, typically bounded by walls to which entry is possible only via a door or other dividing structure. The entrance connects it to either a passageway, another room, or the outdoors. The space is typically large enough for several people to move about. The size, fixtures, furnishings, and sometimes placement of the room within the building or ship (or sometimes a train) support the activity to be conducted in it.

== History ==
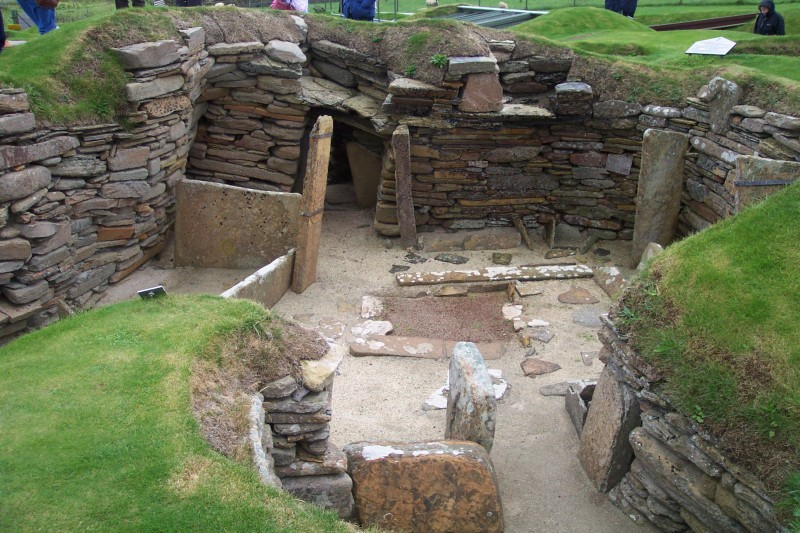
Neolithic room at Skara Brae, Orkney, c. 3,000 BC

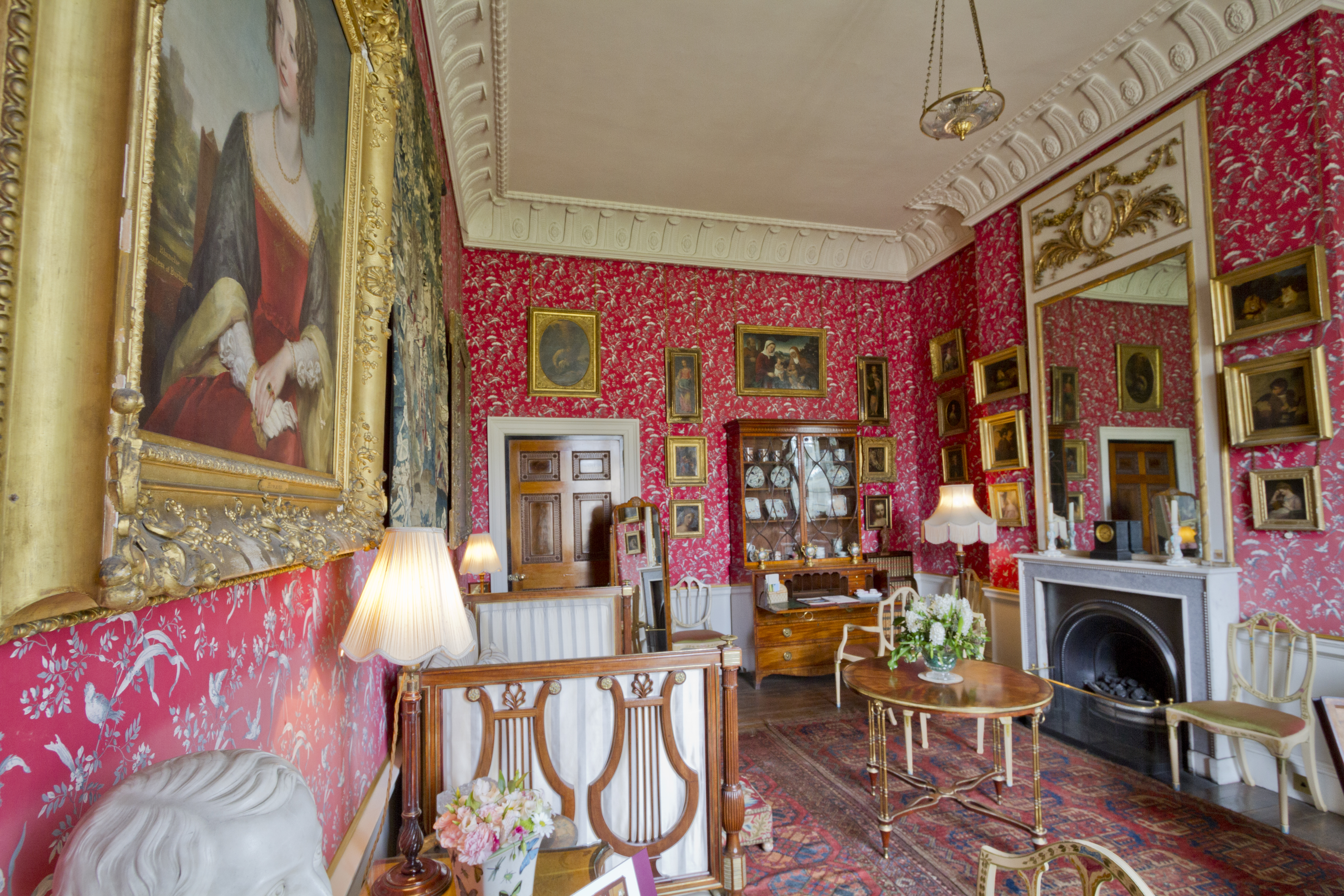
Castle Howard, "Lady Georgianas' Dressing Room"

Historically, the use of rooms dates at least to early Minoan cultures about 2200 BC, where excavations at Akrotiri on Santorini reveal clearly defined rooms within certain structures.

In early structures, the different room types could be identified to include bedrooms, kitchens, bathing rooms, closets, reception rooms, and other specialized uses. The aforementioned Akrotiri excavations reveal rooms sometimes built above other rooms connected by staircases, bathrooms with alabaster appliances such as washbasins, bathing tubs, and toilets, all connected to an elaborate twin plumbing systems of ceramic pipes for cold and hot water separately. Ancient Rome manifested very complex building forms with a variety of room types, including some of the earliest examples of rooms for indoor bathing. The Anasazi civilization also had an early complex development of room structures, probably the oldest in North America, while the Maya of Central America had very advanced room configurations as early as several hundred AD. By at least the early Han dynasty in China (e.g. approximately 200 BC), comfort room complex multi-level building forms emerged, particularly for religious and public purposes; these designs featured many roomed structures and included vertical connections of rooms.

== Types of rooms ==
=== Work rooms ===
Some rooms were specially designed to support the work of the household, such as kitchens, pantries, and root cellars, all of which were intended for the preparation and storage of food. A home office or study may be used for household paperwork or external business purposes. Some work rooms are designated by the intended activity: for example, a sewing room is used for sewing, and the laundry room is used for washing and ironing laundry.

Other rooms are meant to promote comfort and cleanliness, such as the toilet and bathroom, which may be combined or which may be in separate rooms. The public equivalent is the restroom, which usually features a toilet and handwashing facilities, but not usually a shower or a bathtub. Showers are only available in athletic or aquatic facilities which feature a changing room.

In the 17th, 18th, and 19th centuries, among those who could afford it, these facilities were kept in separate areas. The kitchen was detached from the main part of the house, or later put in the basement, to reduce the risk of fire and keep the heat and smell of cooking away from the main house during the warm months. The toilet, often a simple pit latrine, was put in an outhouse or privy, to keep the smell and insects away from the main house.

=== Social rooms ===
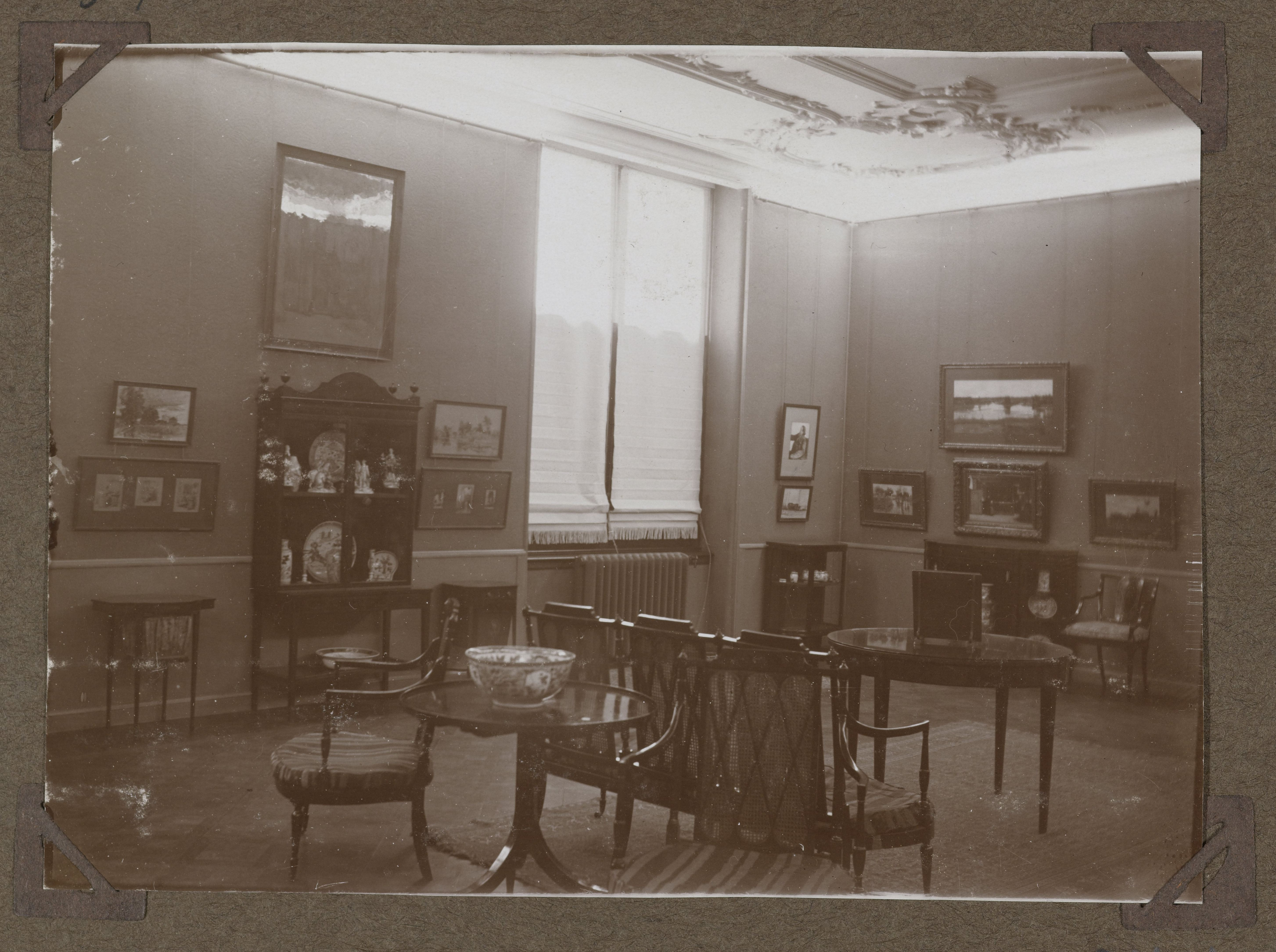
Social room pictured in 1927

A variety of room types have been distinguished over time, the main purpose of which was socializing with other people.

In previous centuries, very large homes often featured a great hall. This room was so named because it was very large, regardless of any excellence in it. It was originally a public room and most likely seen in the main home of a noble estate. In this room, people who had business with the local landowner or his household could meet. As the largest room, it could also be used as a dining room for large banquets, or cleared of tables, provided with music, and turned into a ballroom. Off the side, or in a different part of the house, might be a drawing room, used as a room with greater privacy, for the owner's family and their friends to talk.

A sitting room, living room, or parlour is a place for social visits and entertainment. One decorated to appeal to a man might be called a man cave; in an older style, the cabinet was used by men who wanted a separate room. Some large homes have special rooms for entertainment; these may include a library, a home theater, a billiard room, a game room, or a music room.

=== Sleeping room ===
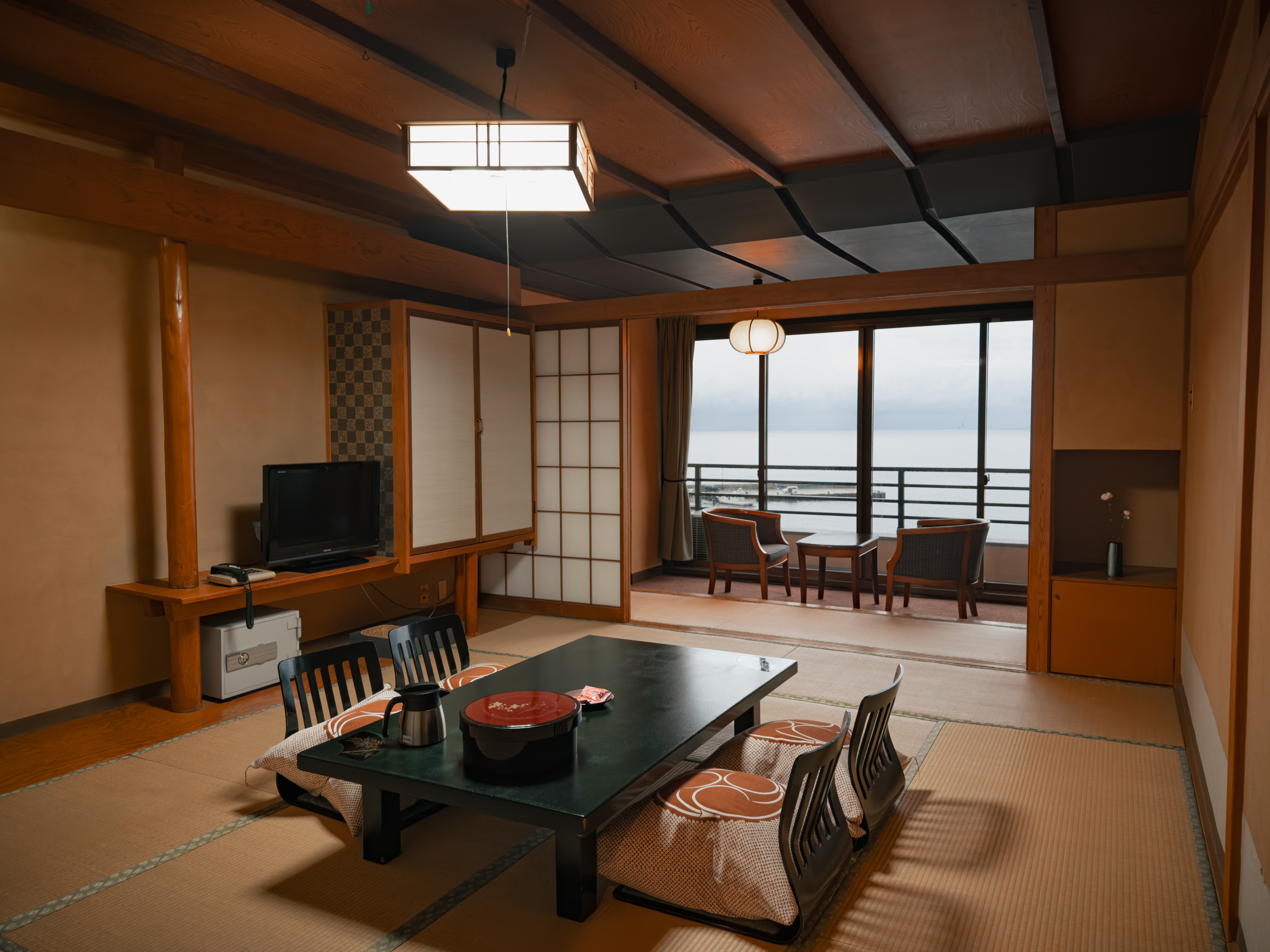
Japanese style sleeping room

A bedroom is the room where a bed is located, and whose primary purpose is sleeping. A master bedroom may have an en suite bathroom. A guest room is a bedroom used primarily by overnight guests. The nursery is a bedroom for babies or young children. It may be separate from the playroom, which is a room where the children's toys are kept.

Bedrooms may be used for other purposes. A large house might have separate rooms for these other functions, such as a dressing room for changing clothes (also seen in clothing stores and businesses where people need to change clothes, but do not need to sleep). In Tudor times, a bedroom might have a separate closet, for praying and seeking privacy; this architectural idea lives on in the storage closet.

In the United Kingdom, many houses are built to contain a box-room (box room or boxroom) that is easily identifiable, being smaller than the others. The small size of these rooms limits their use, and they tend to be used as a small single bedroom, small child's bedroom, or as a storage room. Other box rooms may house a live-in domestic worker. Traditionally, and often seen in country houses and larger suburban houses up until the 1930s in Britain, the box room was for the storage of boxes, trunks, portmanteaux, and the like, rather than for bedroom use. In Ireland, a return room is a box room added between floors at the turn ("return") of a staircase. Return rooms may be added as extensions, and are sometimes used or converted for other functions such as a kitchen or bathroom.

A sick room is a specialized room, sometimes just large enough to contain a bed, where a family member could be conveniently tended and kept separate from the rest of the household while recuperating from an illness.

=== Multi-purpose rooms ===
In smaller homes, most rooms were multi-purpose. In a bedsit, communal apartment, or studio apartment, a single main room may serve most functions, except usually the toilet and bath. Types of multi-purpose rooms include the great room, which removes most walls and doors between the kitchen, dining and living rooms, to create one larger, open area.

In some places, a lady's boudoir was a combination sleeping room and place to entertain small numbers of friends. In others, the boudoir was an anteroom before her bedroom.

=== En-suite room ===
An en-suite room is a type of room which includes a private room, private washroom and access to a communal kitchen. The washroom generally includes an en-suite shower, a sink and a toilet. "En-suite" usually indicates a private space, especially if it is student accommodation. En-suite rooms for students are intended to provide study space and a peaceful environment.

== See also ==
- Entryway
- Great hall
- Room number
- The Room (disambiguation)
- Classroom
- Ballroom
