= Oliver Roome =

British Army officer (1921–2009)

Major-General Oliver Roome CBE
- Born: 9 March 1921; Dehra Dun, India
- Died: 8 November 2009 (aged 88)
- Relatives: Major General Sir Horace Roome (father)
- Military career
- Allegiance: United Kingdom
- Branch: British Army
- Service years: 1939–1976
- Rank: Major-General
- Unit: Royal Engineers
- Commands: Joint Services Liaison Organisation; 107 Corps Engineer Regiment; 38 (Berlin) Field Squadron; 219 Field Park Company; 625 Field Squadron
- Conflicts: Second World War; North African campaign; Second Battle of El Alamein; Italian campaign; Allied invasion of Sicily
- Awards: Commander of the Order of the British Empire

Major-General Oliver McCrea Roome, CBE (9 March 1921 – 8 November 2009) was a British Army officer.

He was the son of Major General Sir Horace Roome.
