= The Room Two =

2013 video game

- Developer: Fireproof Games
- Publisher: Fireproof Games
- Composer: Chris Green
- Engine: Unity
- Platforms: iOS, Android, Windows, Apple Arcade, Nintendo Switch
- Release: iOS; 12 December 2013; Android; 13 February 2014; Windows; 5 July 2016; Apple Arcade; 2 April 2021; Nintendo Switch; 18 August 2022
- Genre: Puzzle
- Mode: Single-player

The Room Two is a 2013 puzzle video game developed by British-based Fireproof Games as a sequel to The Room. The game was originally developed for the iPad and released in December 2013; it was made universal to work with the iPhone in January 2014. The Android version was released in February 2014. A Windows version was released on 5 July 2016. An Apple Arcade version, named «The Room Two+», was released on 2 April 2021. It was also released for Nintendo Switch in August 2022.

A third title, The Room Three, was released for mobile platforms in November 2015.

== Gameplay ==
The Room Two is a three-dimensional puzzle game. As in the original, each level is in a single room and tasks the player with solving a series of connected puzzles, typically involving collecting clues and parts of mechanisms to unlock complex puzzle boxes and collect new clues and components they contain. The game uses the mobile device's touch screen controls to simulate actions like turning a key or opening a drawer, as well as to zoom in and out of the various puzzles. Each room may contain several different puzzles in different locations, which the player can move freely between. Ultimately, the player is seeking an exit from each room as to proceed to the next. The player has a lens that shows special messages and areas made from "Null", a strange material central to the game's plot.

== Plot ==
The game's story continues from the previous title, in which the player is trapped in a mysterious Null-based dimension, and is following in the footsteps of an acquaintance (known only as "A.S.") who has discovered these boxes based on the Null element, which imbues them with supernatural properties. Through a series of notes, A.S. reveals his entrapment in this dimension; he has found rooms that are attached to others that have come in contact with Null, the material warping the reality around these self-contained rooms, yet linking them together. Passage is only possible when the puzzle is solved, revealing a piece of Null, which, when viewed with the player's eyepiece, reveals the next door. The letters from the friend tell the player-character to move through each room quickly, warning of the risk of insanity to those who are exposed to it too long. A.S. reveals that he had become too far gone to find an escape. While working within one of the rooms, the player discovers the body of A.S., who has been trapped with the rooms for many years due to the strange passage of time within Null. The player, on completing the final room, finds the exit leading back to the house where the first game started, but chased by tendrils of an evil entity using the Null. The player-character escapes the house in time as the tendrils cause parts of the house to implode, taking away the passage to Null with it.

== Development and release ==
The Room Two was released on iTunes for iPad iOS 7 devices on 12 December 2013. The iPad version became a universal app to include iPhones in January 2014, and the Android version was released on 13 February 2014. A reworked version for Windows, enhancing much of the game's graphics, was released on 5 July 2016. A version for the Nintendo Switch was released on 18 August 2022.

== Reception ==
Reception

Aggregate score
Aggregator	Score
Metacritic	88/100

Review scores
Publication	Score
Edge	8/10
Eurogamer	8/10
Game Informer	8.25/10
Hardcore Gamer	5/5
IGN	8.6/10
Pocket Gamer	iOS: 4.5/5
TouchArcade	iOS: 5/5

Upon release, The Room Two garnered critical acclaim. It was featured on the iTunes Editor's Choice list. Metacritic awarded the game an 88 out of 100, with 25 reviewers. It was nominated for two BAFTAs - British Game and Handheld/Mobile Game. The Verge praised the inventive and mentally taxing puzzles and scenarios. Hardcore Gamer gave the game a perfect score, calling it a "fascinating game and perhaps the truest take on classic horror in recent memory."

On 6 March 2014 Fireproof Games revealed that they had sold over 1.2 million copies of the game. Along with the sales of its predecessor The Room, the series has sold over 5.4 million copies.
