= Return of the Obra Dinn =

2018 video game

- Publisher: 3909 LLC.
- Designer: Lucas Pope
- Artist: Lucas Pope
- Engine: Unity
- Platforms: macOS; Windows; Nintendo Switch; PlayStation 4; Xbox One
- Release: macOS, Windows; October 18, 2018; Switch, PS4, Xbox One; October 18, 2019
- Genres: Adventure, puzzle
- Mode: Single-player

Return of the Obra Dinn is a 2018 adventure and puzzle video game created by Lucas Pope and published by 3909 LLC. It was Pope's second commercial game, following 2013's Papers, Please, and was first released for macOS and Windows before being ported to Nintendo Switch, PlayStation 4, and Xbox One a year later. Return of the Obra Dinn was praised for its gameplay, art style, and narrative; it won several awards, including the Seumas McNally Grand Prize.

The game is set in 1807 with the player assuming the role of an unnamed investigator for the East India Company. The Obra Dinn, a merchant ship missing for five years, has reappeared off the coast of England with no known surviving crew or passengers. The player is dispatched to the ghost ship to perform an appraisal, reconstruct the events of the voyage, and determine the fates of all sixty souls aboard, providing a cause of death for those deceased or a probable current location for those presumed living. Investigation is accomplished through the use of the "Memento Mortem", a pocket watch capable of recreating a death at the moment it occurred. The game, played in first-person perspective, uses a "1-bit" monochromatic graphical style inspired by games on early Macintosh computers.

Return of Obra Dinn first released on macOS and Windows on October 18, 2018. It received generally positive reviews from critics who praised its story, puzzles, creativity, and favorably compared it to Her Story (2015). It was cited by several outlets as among the best video games of 2018, and retrospectively, one of the greatest of all time.

== Gameplay ==
The Memento Mortem being used to investigate the cause of death of one of the crewmembers

The Obra Dinn, insured by the East India Company, went missing in 1803 as it was to sail around the Cape of Good Hope. It has since reappeared with all sixty passengers and crew dead or missing. The player is tasked with determining the fate of all souls on board, including their names, how they met their fate, who or what their killer was, and their location should they be alive.

Return of the Obra Dinn is effectively one large logic puzzle. The game is played as a first-person adventure game, allowing the player to fully explore the Obra Dinn, using a monochromatic dithering style to mimic the shading and color methods of early computer games. To help track their progress, the player is given a logbook that includes a drawing of all the crew members, the crew roster, and a plan of the ship. They are also given the Memento Mortem, a pocket watch that can be used on a corpse to hear the events that transpired in the seconds immediately before death and explore the moment of death frozen in time. This is used to identify who was present, to examine moments in other rooms or on other decks, and to note details at the scene. These are used to help connect the faces of crewmates to their names and roles. While exploring a moment of death, the player can use the pocket watch again to explore the fates of other corpses in the vision.

With each death, the logbook automatically fills in basic information. The player is tasked only with naming those present and accurately describing their cause of death. Naming the crew is done through small clues, inferences, and logical deduction—mainly, narrowing possibilities as the game progresses. The causes of death are selected out of a catalogue, and some deaths will accept more than one solution. The player can revise their logbook as they gain more information, but to deter guesswork, correct fates are validated only in sets of three, with the exception of the last six fates discovered in a playthrough, which are validated in sets of two until closer to the end when the player accurately logs the names and causes of death for fifty-eight of the sixty who were on board.

== Plot ==
The Obra Dinn, an East Indiaman under the command of Captain Robert Witterel, departs with 52 crewmen and 8 passengers from Falmouth, Cornwall, to the Orient in 1802. Among the ship's passengers are Witterel's wife Abigail; musician Nunzio Pasqua; wealthy Englishwoman Jane Bird; and two Formosan nobles and their guards transporting an exquisite chest. The ship fails to keep her rendezvous at the Cape of Good Hope and is declared lost. Five years later, the vessel reappears off the coast of England with every soul dead or missing. The East India Company sends a newly appointed chief inspector to determine what happened. The inspector receives a copy of the Obra Dinn's logbook, drawings of the passengers and crew, and the Memento Mortem—a magical pocket watch—from the ship's surgeon Henry Evans, who lives in Morocco. The Mortem, when used on a corpse or its traces, enables the user to observe the exact moment of the corpse's death, frozen in time.

Early in the voyage, a seaman and a stowaway are crushed to death by unsecured cargo, and two seamen die of pneumonia. As the ship passes the Canary Islands, Pasqua discovers the second mate, Edward Nichols, skulking after the Formosans' chest in the cargo hold. Nichols stabs Pasqua dead and frames one of the Formosan guards. Witterel, bound to Company regulations, has the guard executed by firing squad. Nichols and a small party of defectors steal the chest, abduct the Formosan nobles, and make for the Canaries in the ship's two jollyboats. Three mermaids ambush and kill most of the group. One of the nobles uses a magical shell pulled from the chest to stun the mermaids at the cost of his life. Nichols, now the sole survivor, captures the mermaids and returns to the Obra Dinn with the chest and the dead nobles, but is fatally shot by the surviving Formosan guard as he approaches. As they are brought aboard, the mermaids, who hold shells of their own, lash out and kill several crewmen before they are locked away in the lazarette. Witterel's steward Fillip Dahl kills a seaman and proclaims that the mermaids are cursed, so he is locked in the lazarette alongside the mermaids and the chest.

Captain Witterel orders the ship to return to England. The mermaids summon a storm and a pair of mermen mounted on giant spider crabs to attempt to rescue them. The mermen and their mounts are killed, but the crew suffer heavy casualties. The mermaids then summon a kraken, whose assault kills Abigail and more crew members and badly damages the ship. In the lazarette, Dahl reaches into the chest and retrieves a shell before he is killed by a quicksilver-like substance inside. Witterel enters the lazarette and kills two of the mermaids before the third finally sends the kraken away. The third mate Martin Perrott and some men enter the lazarette later to set the last mermaid free. The mermaid instinctively spikes Perrott, who in his dying moments asks her to see the Obra Dinn home in exchange for her freedom. The others return the shell to the mermaid before putting her back in the sea.

Evans decides to abandon the Obra Dinn and make for Africa. Before leaving, Evans ties a rope to his monkey's wrist and sends it into the locked lazarette. He shoots the monkey dead and uses the rope to retrieve its paw, intending to use the Mortem on it later. Evans escapes with some others in a jollyboat, and a series of scuffles reduces the Obra Dinn's crew to four, including Witterel. The three others mutiny, seeking the shells, but Witterel states that he has thrown them into the sea and kills the mutineers in combat. Now the only one left, Witterel commits suicide near the body of his wife.

Unable to access the lazarette, the inspector catalogues the fates of 58 of the 60 souls aboard and leaves before a storm sinks the Obra Dinn. The inspector writes an insurance report, compensating or fining the estates of lost crewmen and passengers depending on their conduct, and mails the logbook back to Evans. A year later, Jane Bird—one of the three survivors who escaped with Evans—mails back the book alongside the monkey's paw and a letter explaining that Evans, now dead of an illness, requested that the inspector be given the means to complete the book as an expression of his gratitude. The inspector uses the Mortem on the monkey's paw to determine what happened in the lazarette and catalogue the last two fates, completing the story of the Obra Dinn for their collection.

=== Alternative endings ===
Bird reports Evans's death in every ending, but she only sends the book and the monkey's paw if the inspector determined all available fates. Otherwise, she will report that Evans appreciated the investigator's attempt or regretted trusting the investigator, depending on how many fates were determined.

== Development ==
Over the course of his career, American video game designer Lucas Pope had developed an appreciation of "1-bit" graphics used in many early Macintosh games. Following his prior game Papers, Please, Pope had wanted to use the 1-bit aesthetic in an experimental game, leading him to develop a game engine that allowed the player to move in a three dimensional space, rendered in a vintage style. Pope wanted to ensure the game was visually legible from most angles, challenging him on some of the rendering aspects. Separately, he found that while the 1-bit graphics worked fine when displayed in an on-screen window, at full screen resolution, players suffered from motion sickness. Rendering routines were modified to create the equivalent of motion blur for this dithering approach. At one point, Pope had considered creating a cathode ray tube render effect, but opted against this.

With the style in place, Pope worked backwards to determine what game to make. His initial idea was one where the player character repeatedly died; the player would see the events of the death from their corpse, and would then be transported back one minute to manipulate the environment so as to recreate that death. However, Pope found this technically challenging, and instead sparked the idea of using freeze-frame flashbacks depicting moments of death to tell a story.

The game's narrative took the longest portion of development. Pope teased Return of the Obra Dinn in 2014 while completing Papers, Please, anticipating a release the next year. Instead, it took four more years. Pope released a limited demo for the 2016 Game Developers Conference, which had only six fates for the player to deduce. Feedback from this was positive, so he began to expand the game's story more than he expected. Internally, Pope created spreadsheets to link all the various characters and their fates, and to ensure that players would be able to logically follow chains of deaths. This ended with him writing the necessary dialog for some scenes and hiring voice actors, provided by locals Pope auditioned, who could mimic the accents of the time period.

With a more complete story, Pope created a new demo to take to PAX Australia in November 2016, adding thirteen additional characters to the original demo. However, unlike the first demo, the deaths were presented out of chronological order, and players were confused about how to progress. Pope realized this confusion would become worse with the full cast of characters. He found a solution by having ten events in the narrative serve as a catalyst for deaths, breaking the story into sections and allowing the plot to be more digestible to the player. Dividing the game into "chapters" then led to the creation of the logbook, serving as the timeline for the game and cataloguing the ship's crew in the same manner as the real East India Company.

Pope stated he was not worried about how well Return of the Obra Dinn would perform financially, as he was still earning appreciable revenue from Papers, Please. He considered Obra Dinn a passion project and did not pressure himself with deadlines or marketing. Return of the Obra Dinn was released for macOS and Windows computers on October 17, 2018, published by the Japanese-based studio 3909. Versions for the Nintendo Switch, PlayStation 4, and Xbox One, ported by Warp Digital, were released on October 18, 2019. Physical editions were released through Limited Run Games for the PS4 and Nintendo Switch in 2020.

In an interview with the YouTuber Cressup, Lucas Pope stated that the game was originally supposed to be a series and that the ending scene of Obra Dinn, if the game was 100% completed, would have given a clue as to the adventures the character was supposed to go on in later games. However, the length of time it took to create the game meant that Lucas then decided to move onto something else rather than continue with the series.

== Reception ==
Reception

Aggregate score
| Aggregator | Score |
|---|---|
| Metacritic | PC: 89/100; NS: 86/100 |

Review scores
| Publication | Score |
|---|---|
| Destructoid | 9.5/10 |
| Eurogamer | Essential |
| Game Informer | 8.75/10 |
| GameSpot | 9/10 |
| IGN | 9.2/10 |
| PC Gamer (US) | 90/100 |
| PC World | 4.5/5 |

Return of the Obra Dinn received "generally favorable reviews", according to review aggregator website Metacritic. Polygon's Colin Campbell recommended the game, saying "Return of the Obra Dinn takes the whodunit's conventions and twists them into kaleidoscopic narratives that are perplexing and delightful. This isn't merely a great game, it's the work of an intense and creative intelligence." Patrick Hancock for Destructoid commented that Pope had "knocked it out of the park" as a follow-up to Papers, Please, and commented that even after finishing the game, he "could not stop thinking about" it. Game Informer's Javy Gwaltney called the art style "visually arresting", and praised the pacing and thought put into the game. However, they were less praising of the ending, commenting that the "ultimate payoff fails to complement the thoughtful gameplay".

The game received praise for being unique. Andreas Inderwildi of Rock Paper Shotgun commented that the game was more than just about logical reasoning, but that players were supposed to take into account how humans would act in an emergency. In his review for Eurogamer, Christian Donlan commented that the graphical style in the game made it "feel like no other", and likened it to Sudoku. Gamasutra's Katherine Cross praised the game's minimalist feel, and that the characters "came off as people". Tom Marks for IGN described the game as being full of life, despite the use of still images to convey the story. GameSpot's David Wildgoose praised the game's book-based interface as a "masterpiece of interconnected design," and that it trusts the player to find the correct answers independently.

Some outlets favorably compared the game to Her Story, a similar mystery-driven game where the player must work out the timeline of events and come to conclusions using numerous video clips. Campbell commented that the two games both made him reach for "a notepad and pen", whilst Andrew Webster writing for The Verge commented that both games were about creating clarity even in confusing situations. Webster went on to comment that there were many ways to enjoy the game, that a player could obsessively find the mysteries in the game, or simply enjoy the "grim, shocking story".

In a review of Return of the Obra Dinn in Black Gate, Joshua Dinges said "It being a very well-constructed mystery game, there's not going to be a lot of replay value, but the modest entry price is more than worth it for the sheer gaming bliss you'll encounter in that single play through."

=== Awards ===
Several video game publications named Return of the Obra Dinn among 2018's best games, including Edge, Polygon, USGamer, GameSpot, The Nerdist, The Daily Telegraph, The New Yorker, and The Escapist. A 2023 poll published by GQ listed Return of the Obra Dinn as among the greatest games of all time.

Awards won
| Year | Award | Category | Result | Ref. |
|---|---|---|---|---|
| 2018 | Peabody Awards | Facebook Futures of Media Award - Video Game | Won | |
| 2018 | The Game Awards 2018 | Best Independent Game | Nominated | |
| 2018 | The Game Awards 2018 | Best Art Direction | Won | |
| 2019 | 22nd Annual D.I.C.E. Awards | Game of the Year | Nominated | |
| 2019 | 22nd Annual D.I.C.E. Awards | Adventure Game of the Year | Nominated | |
| 2019 | 22nd Annual D.I.C.E. Awards | Outstanding Achievement for an Independent Game | Nominated | |
| 2019 | 22nd Annual D.I.C.E. Awards | Outstanding Achievement in Game Direction | Nominated | |
| 2019 | 22nd Annual D.I.C.E. Awards | Outstanding Achievement in Game Design | Nominated | |
| 2019 | 22nd Annual D.I.C.E. Awards | Outstanding Achievement in Story | Nominated | |
| 2019 | SXSW Gaming Awards | Excellence in Art | Nominated | |
| 2019 | SXSW Gaming Awards | Excellence in Design | Nominated | |
| 2019 | Independent Games Festival Awards | Seumas McNally Grand Prize | Won | |
| 2019 | Independent Games Festival Awards | Excellence in Visual Art | Nominated | |
| 2019 | Independent Games Festival Awards | Excellence in Narrative | Won | |
| 2019 | Independent Games Festival Awards | Excellence in Audio | Nominated | |
| 2019 | Independent Games Festival Awards | Excellence in Design | Nominated | |
| 2019 | Game Developers Choice Awards | Game of the Year | Nominated | |
| 2019 | Game Developers Choice Awards | Best Narrative | Won | |
| 2019 | Game Developers Choice Awards | Best Visual Art | Nominated | |
| 2019 | Game Developers Choice Awards | Innovation Award | Nominated | |
| 2019 | 15th British Academy Games Awards | Best Game | Nominated | |
| 2019 | 15th British Academy Games Awards | Artistic Achievement | Won | |
| 2019 | 15th British Academy Games Awards | Game Design | Won | |
| 2019 | 15th British Academy Games Awards | Game Innovation | Nominated | |
| 2019 | 15th British Academy Games Awards | Narrative | Nominated | |
| 2019 | 15th British Academy Games Awards | Original Property | Nominated | |

== Legacy ==
Return of the Obra Dinn is credited with inspiring a wave of deduction-based games over the following years, such as The Case of the Golden Idol (2022) and The Roottrees are Dead (2023). In particular, the mechanic that requires players to have three correct pieces of information before anything can be "locked in" became commonplace in the detective genre after its release, as other games used it to prevent brute-force tactics. By 2026, the lack of such a mechanic was a point of note in reviews for the deduction game TR-49.

== See also ==
- Ditherpunk
