= Room number =

Number assigned to a room

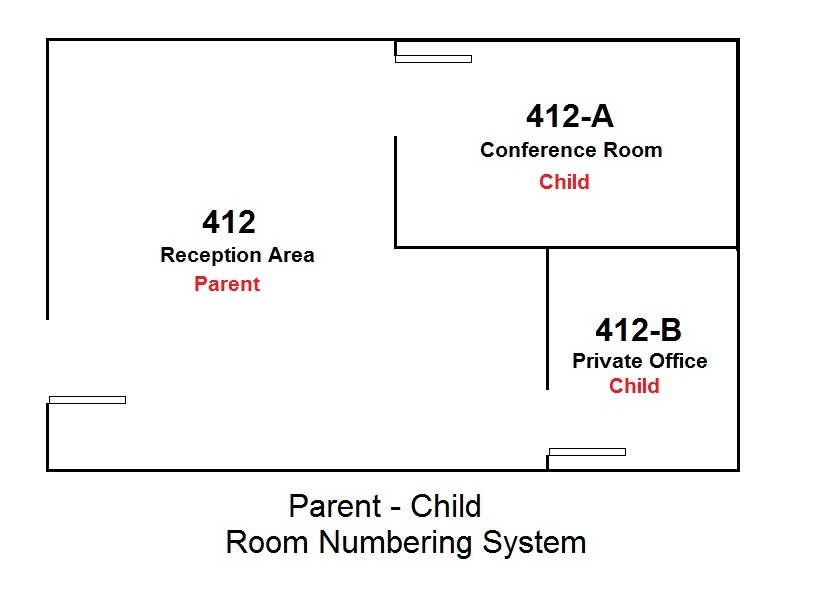
Parent-child room numbering system

A room number is a number assigned to a room within a building. Its purpose is to identify a particular room, and help building inhabitants locate that room.

Room numbers may consist of three digits, but can be any number of digits. The room number is generally assigned with the first digit indicating the floor on which the room is located.

== Numbering systems ==
Similarly to how house numbering systems vary depending on the region, room numbering systems do too. Some numbering systems inform the floor in which the room is located, but not all.

=== Floor + one digit ===
Some places in Brazil use a system in which the floor number is followed by only one number. In this system, apartment 52 is the second apartment on the 5th floor.

=== Floor + two digits ===
In many places, the number of a room is determined by the number of the floor followed by two digits that inform the number of the room itself, even if there are fewer than 10 rooms per floor. This system is used in the United States by the University of Hawaiʻi at Mānoa for buildings with fewer than 99 rooms per floor. This way, the 5th's floor 2nd apartment would be number 502.

In Sweden, floor numbers must have two digits, followed by two digits for the room number. Floor numbers start from 10 at ground level, and go down for underground floors, and up for above ground floors. In Sweden, the 5th's floor 2nd apartment would be number 1502.

=== Italy ===
In Rome, Italy, some addresses explicitly mention which floor ("piano") the apartment is located at. So an address could read "piano 5, interno 2" for the second apartment in the 5th floor.
