= The Room Three =

2015 video game

- Developer: Fireproof Games
- Publisher: Fireproof Games
- Series: The Room
- Engine: Unity
- Platforms: Android, iOS, Microsoft Windows
- Release: iOS: WW: 4 November 2015; Android: WW: 11 January 2016; Microsoft Windows: WW: 13 November 2018
- Genre: Puzzle
- Mode: Single-player

The Room Three is a 2015 puzzle video game developed by Fireproof Games. It was released for iOS in November 2015, Android in January 2016 and Microsoft Windows in November 2018.

== Gameplay ==
The Room Three, as its predecessors, is an escape the room game, where by solving puzzle boxes and other similar puzzles, the player reveals new secrets and puzzles towards reaching the game's conclusion. The game is presented in a first-person, three-dimensional view, allowing the player to look around rooms from a spot, or rotate their view around a puzzle box or similar object. Elements of objects can be interacted with, such as pushing buttons, inserting and turning keys, or sliding sections around. Items can be collected and examined from the player's inventory, which many include manipulation of that object to reveal secret chambers or the like. As with previous games, The Room Three also has some puzzles made out of the classical element Null, which can bend reality. The player-character has a special eyepiece that he can wear to see through the Null, revealing hidden clues or puzzle parts. The Room Three introduces an additional lens for this eyepiece that allows the player-character to manipulate objects within small spaces like keyholes. The Room Three is structured around a central hub area and with four main areas that are accessed through this. There are optional puzzles scattered in the central hub that can be solved as to reach one of the game's alternate endings.

== Plot ==
Continuing after the events of The Room Two, the player-character has escaped the home of "A.S." before it was consumed by the entity from the Null. A journal written by the protagonist indicates that he is haunted by the events of The Room Two, and has tried to find answers via the Royal Institute. The Journal also indicates that he has found some clue that directs him to a strange island. He leaves on the train to go to the island. A strange box appears in his passenger compartment as the train passes through a tunnel, inside which is revealed a pyramid with strange etchings. When the train passes through the next tunnel, the player-character is mysteriously transported to Grey Holm, an island estate some ways off the English coastline in the English Channel. A series of notes inform the character that he was brought here by "The Craftsman", who also claims the credit of creating puzzles that were in the previous games, and is impressed with the character's ability to resist the Null. He wants to release the Null with help of the player character, and instructs him to collect four additional Null Shards, the same as the pyramid he collected on the train, which will help him gain the Craftsman's Key and open an exit from Grey Holm.

The game has four different endings. Should the player only end up collecting the Craftsman's Key, he directs his character towards the Grey Holm tower, opening an exit back to the train with the key. However, once aboard the train, he finds a new note from The Craftsman that reveals that it was a ruse, and that his soul will be trapped forever. The camera pulls back to reveal the train to be running on rails within an infinite maze within a globe in Grey Holm (The "Imprisoned" ending).

If the player solves additional puzzles in Grey Holm, a mechanical clairvoyant called Mystical Maggie aids the player by revealing that The Craftsman intends to use the player's soul as a sacrifice to the Null element; additional notes reveal Maggie had been human once and had also been lured by the Craftsman to Grey Holm. Interacting with Maggie provides additional clues to more devices like the Craftsman's Key. Depending on how the player uses these devices alongside the Craftsman's Key at the tower puzzle, the player-character can either escape Grey Holm and watch it be destroyed by the Null entity ("Escape"), escape Grey Holm and watch the Null entity be released to the world ("Release"), or get teleported to the giant temples on the planet he remotely explored earlier in the game ("Lost").

== Reception ==
Reception

Aggregate score
| Aggregator | Score |
|---|---|
| Metacritic | 90/100 |

Review score
| Publication | Score |
|---|---|
| TouchArcade | 5/5 |

The Room Three gained critical acclaim, with Metacritic giving a Metascore of 90 out of 100 based on 14 critics, and a reviewer from Hardcore Gamer giving a score of 4 out of 5.

The game received a score of 9.0/10 by IGN, 5/5 by TouchArcade, and 8/10 by Game Informer. It was entitled with the Pocket Gamer Gold Award. Later it won iOS Game of the Year in Pocket Gamer Awards 2016. The game was enlisted among 60 Best Educational Apps by Tutora. It emerged as finalist under Best 3D Visuals and Best Mobile Game categories of Unity Awards 2016. The game was nominated for a BAFTA award for the best "Mobile & Handheld" game in 2016. During the 19th Annual D.I.C.E. Awards, the Academy of Interactive Arts & Sciences nominated The Room Three for "Mobile Game of the Year".

== Sequel ==
Fireproof Games released a sequel titled The Room: Old Sins. It was released on iOS on 15 January 2018 and on Android on 19 April 2018.
