= Horace Roome =

Major-General Sir Horace Roome KCIE CB CBE MC DL
- Roome in 1945
- Born: 17 May 1887; Westbury, Tasmania, Australia
- Died: 29 June 1964 (aged 77); East Cowes, Isle of Wight, England
- Relatives: Major-General Oliver Roome (son)
- Military career
- Allegiance: United Kingdom
- Branch: British Army
- Service years: 1907–1947
- Rank: Major-General
- Unit: Royal Engineers
- Conflicts: First World War; Second World War
- Awards: Knight Commander of the Order of the Indian Empire; Companion of the Order of the Bath; Commander of the Order of the British Empire; Military Cross; Mentioned in Despatches

Major-General Sir Horace Eckford Roome, KCIE, CB, CBE, MC, DL (17 May 1887 – 29 June 1964) was an officer of the Royal Engineers.

Roome was commissioned into the Royal Engineers from the Royal Military Academy, Woolwich, on 18 December 1907. He served during the First World War, during which he was awarded the Military Cross in 1916 for "distinguished service in the field in Mesopotamia" and was Mentioned in Despatches.

During the Second World War, Roome was appointed Brigadier and Chief Engineer India from 1 August 1939 to 20 November 1941. He was promoted to acting major-general on 21 November 1941, temporary major-general on 21 November 1942, and finally substantive major-general on 8 May 1944 (with seniority 25 September 1941). He was Engineer-in-Chief at General Headquarters, India in 1945.

Roome was appointed a Commander of the Order of the British Empire in 1941 and a Companion of the Order of the Bath in 1944. He was knighted as a Knight Commander of the Order of the Indian Empire in 1946. He retired on 8 January 1947.

His son was Major-General Oliver Roome of the Royal Engineers.
