= Fireproof Studios =

British video game development studio

Fireproof Studios Ltd
- Company type: Private
- Industry: Video games
- Founded: 3 September 2008; 17 years ago
- Founders: Christopher Cannon; Tony Cartwright; Mark Hamilton; Barry Meade; David Rack; Damien Leigh Rayfield
- Headquarters: Guildford, England
- Products: The Room series
- Number of employees: 17 (2018)
- Divisions: Fireproof Games
- Website: fireproofgames.com

Fireproof Studios Ltd is a British video game art studio based in Guildford, England, and founded in September 2008. Fireproof Games, a division of the company, acts as video game developer. The company is best known for its The Room series of puzzle video games, of which the first, The Room (2012), was named "Best British Game" at the 2013 British Academy Games Awards, and sold over two million copies as of May 2013.

== History ==
Fireproof Studios was founded on 3 September 2008 by Christopher Cannon, Tony Cartwright, Mark Hamilton, Barry Meade, David Rack and Damien Leigh Rayfield. The six founders were formerly employed by Criterion Games and met while working on Burnout 3 and developed the idea of working as a team during work on Burnout Paradise.

The studio was intended to be a freelance art studio, but eventually started creating its own games. Fireproof Studios credited LittleBigPlanet creator Media Molecule, who outsourced art creation for LittleBigPlanet's downloadable content and LittleBigPlanet 2 to Fireproof Studios, as a major help during their first two years. Fireproof Studios worked closely with Guerrilla Games to provide the art for multiplayer levels within Killzone: Shadow Fall and Killzone: Mercenary. Fireproof Studios has also contributed art and assets to Ridge Racer Unbounded, the DJ Hero series, and Kinect Sesame Street TV.

In 2012, Fireproof Studios opened a division, Fireproof Games, that would focus on video game development. Their first game was The Room, and they have since developed four sequels to the game by 2020, building their team to about 17 employees. They also currently working on a new title unrelated to The Room games.

In 2025, their game Ghost Town was nominated for "Best VR/AR Game" at The Game Awards 2025. During the 29th Annual D.I.C.E. Awards in 2026, Ghost Town won the award for "Immersive Reality Game of the Year", along with a nomination for "Immersive Reality Technical Achievement".

=== The Room series ===
Fireproof's principal product has been a series of puzzle games called The Room. As of 2020, there have been five titles in the series, first released for mobile devices (iOS and Android), and have seen selected ports to Microsoft Windows and the Nintendo Switch, with the most recent game being released exclusively for virtual reality. The name "The Room" came from producer Barry Meade's time at Media Molecule, where "The Room" was a codename of an unused tech demo.

Each non VR game involves a series of highly detailed virtual puzzle boxes, which the player sees from a first-person perspective, giving them the ability to zoom in and out and move around the puzzle box to locate its features. Each puzzle box requires the player to manipulate elements on the box to access hidden caches or mechanisms so as to explore the contents of each box further. Manipulation of these elements is via the device's touchscreen (or in the case of Windows, through the mouse interface), such as turning handles or sliding boxes. The game's mythos involves a fifth classical element called "Null" which has the ability to bend reality and warp the mind of those in contact with it. Some portions of these boxes are constructed from Null. The player can tap a special icon to wear an eyepiece that lets them see into the Null to discover hidden information or manipulate parts of the puzzle box. Each game in the series generally has several puzzles, with a narrative of the player following in the footsteps of one that previously had been in contact with the Null, leaving notes behind that become more and more deranged with each puzzle.

The first game, The Room took six months to develop and was released in September 2012 by Fireproof Games. It was featured as editor's choice on its release and later named the iPad Game of the Year for 2012. At the 2012 British Academy Video Games Awards, The Room won the award for Best British Game, as well as being nominated in the Mobile & Handheld, Artistic Achievement and Debut Game categories. By May 2013, The Room sold over two million copies.

Following the success of the first game they began development of a sequel, The Room Two, which was released on iPad on 12 December 2013. Fireproof Games released The Room Two to iOS and Android devices in early 2014.

A second sequel, The Room Three, was released for mobile devices in November 2015. In August 2017, Fireproof Games noted on their social media that they had "no immediate plans" to bring the game to Microsoft Windows, as they did with the previous episodes, but later amended that they were "hoping to get that done" in the second half of 2018. The PC port was later released on 13 November 2018.

The third sequel, The Room: Old Sins was first released for mobile on the iOS on 25 January 2018; the Android version was released on 19 April 2018. It was released on Windows on 11 February 2021.

The Room VR: A Dark Matter was released on 26 March 2020. A virtual reality game supporting Oculus VR, Steam VR, and PlayStation VR devices, The Room VR features new puzzles with the player able to manipulate them through VR controls and to explore environments. It was available on the Vive. During the 24th Annual D.I.C.E. Awards, the Academy of Interactive Arts & Sciences nominated The Room VR: A Dark Matter for "Immersive Reality Game of the Year".

== Games developed ==
- The Room (2012)
- The Room Two (2013)
- The Room Three (2015)
- Omega Agent (2015)
- The Room: Old Sins (2018)
- The Room VR: A Dark Matter (2020)
- Ghost Town (2025)
