= The Room: Old Sins =

2018 video game

- Developer: Fireproof Games
- Publisher: Fireproof Games
- Engine: Unity
- Platforms: Android, iOS, Microsoft Windows
- Release: iOS; 25 January 2018; Android; 19 April 2018; Microsoft Windows; 11 February 2021
- Genre: Puzzle
- Mode: Single-player

The Room: Old Sins or The Room 4: Old Sins is a puzzle video game developed by Fireproof Games, and the fourth game in their series, The Room. It was released for mobile platforms in January 2018 and Windows in February 2021.

== Gameplay ==
Like the preceding games, The Room: Old Sins is a variation on escape the room games, in which the player is presented with a highly detailed dollhouse to examine and find various secrets within it by manipulating objects within it and solving its puzzles. Parts of these puzzles involve interacting with a unique material known as the Null, which has the ability to warp reality. Using a special eyepiece, the player can see objects made of Null, with hidden objects or puzzles seen through the Null item. Items can be collected and examined, and in some cases, manipulated to reveal another object or prepare the item to be used in a puzzle. If the player becomes stuck, the game provides a hint system, where after a certain amount of time, the player can request a hint; there is no penalty for using these.

Unlike previous games, where the players worked their way through a series of rooms with one or more puzzles within each, the dollhouse of Old Sins presents several interconnected puzzles between multiple rooms of the dollhouse. The player may have up to three different rooms as well as the exterior of the dollhouse to solve each puzzle, with new rooms becoming accessible through the course of the game. There are interconnected puzzle elements between these rooms as well; for example, water that is being pumped into the kitchen must be heated to generate steam that is needed to drive equipment in the workshop. Each room contains a special artifact as its ultimate "prize". Once this artifact is collected, the room is overtaken by a malevolent entity that is tied to the Null, making it no longer accessible.

== Plot ==
At the turn of the 20th century, the player character enters Waldegrave Manor, searching for any clues to the wealthy couple that once lived there: Edward, an ambitious engineer, and Abigail, his high-society wife. The only item of interest found is a detailed dollhouse, mirroring Waldegrave Manor, in the attic. As the player-character examines the dollhouse, he finds notes left by Edward and Abigail, detailing their fate. Edward had received a piece of Null and took great interest in studying it, devoting more and more of his time to it than Abigail. Abigail recognized that Edward's work with the Null was twisting both his mind and the reality of their home, and tried to pull him away from his work. After he attacked her when she got in his way, she took the Null and hid it in a dollhouse within the Manor's attic and then fled. Edward, driven insane by the Null, searched frantically through the house for Abigail or the Null, but never could escape himself due to the reality-warping powers of the Null that caused him to become stuck in a recursive loop between the dollhouse and the Manor. He ended up realizing that the Null was hidden in the dollhouse but could not find the means to open it, and allowed the malevolent force drawn by the Null to take his life.

The player-character finds Edward's body near the dollhouse and is able to open it to find the hidden Null piece within it, placing it within a special compartment of their toolkit. Once removed, the dollhouse reverts to a more ordinary plaything. The player-character is revealed to be a member of the Circle, a secret organization that are collecting the various pieces of Null that have been discovered before; the player's actual task was to locate the Null found by Edward. Narration reveals that the members of the Circle should have been more wary of Abigail for having the insight of how to hide the Null from Edward.

== Development and release ==
Like previous titles, The Room: Old Sins was developed using the Unity game engine. The game was announced on 6 March 2017 and was released on iOS on 23 January 2018. When discussing the delay for Android version, Fireproof Games explained there were multiple reported bugs that needed to be fixed first on the iOS version before they could focus on the Android version. They further noted that there are a large number of devices with wider range in CPU speeds, memory sizes and screen resolutions, including the more active versions of that operating system and customized versions that device manufactures supply. Fireproof Games revealed their approach to handling the situation is get a solid representative set by picking a baseline of minimum capabilities. For The Room: Old Sins specifically, they've restricted themselves to OpenGL ES3.0, making it easier for them to develop the game. After that, they hired a dedicated Quality Assurance company to test the game. Before the Android release on 19 April, the game had an open beta.

Fireproof released the Windows version The Room: Old Sins on 11 February 2021.

== Reception ==
Reception

Aggregate score
Aggregator	Score
Metacritic	86/100

Review scores
Publication	Score
Game Informer	iOS: 8.3/10
Pocket Gamer	iOS: 4.5/5
TouchArcade	iOS: 5/5

The Room: Old Sins gained critical acclaim, with Metacritic giving a score of 86 out of 100 based on 8 critics. TouchArcade rated it 5 out of 5 describes it to be among the best puzzle game the App Store has to offer. 148Apps rated it 4.5 out of 5 and said "An incredible game, sets the bar of quality for this kind of experience ridiculously high." According to The Verge, "The creepy touchscreen puzzle boxes are better than ever in The Room: Old Sins." Game Informer said "The Room: Old Sins is already one of the year's best mobile games" and gave it a score of 8.3/10. The game won Pocket Gamer Gold Award and a rating of 9/10.

The game was nominated for "British Game" and "Mobile Game" at the 15th British Academy Games Awards.
