= British Academy Games Award for Game Design =

Video game award

British Academy Video Games Award for Game Design
- Awarded for: The best game design that captivates and engages the player
- Country: United Kingdom
- Presented by: BAFTA
- First award: 2012
- Currently held by: Blue Prince
- Website: www.bafta.org/games

The British Academy Video Games Award for Game Design is an award presented annually by the British Academy of Film and Television Arts (BAFTA). It is given in honor of "the best game design that captivates and engages the player", including recognition of elements such as game mechanics, use of controls, level and world structure, and pacing.

The award was first given at the 8th British Academy Video Games Awards ceremony, held in 2012, to the Valve title Portal 2. Since its inception, the award has been given to eleven games and, to date, no developer has won the award more than once. Nintendo EPD and Ubisoft Montreal hold the record for most nominations among developers, with four each, though the former won in 2017, leaving the latter as the developer with most nominations without a win. Sony Interactive Entertainment lead the publishing nominees, with fifteen nominations and two wins, while Ubisoft are the publisher with the most nominations without a win, with five.

The current holder of the award is Blue Prince by Dogubomb and published by Raw Fury, which won at the 22nd British Academy Games Awards in 2026.

== Winners and nominees ==
In the following table, the years are listed as per BAFTA convention, and generally correspond to the year of game release in the United Kingdom.

Table key
| Indicates the winner |

| Year | Game | Developer(s) | Publisher(s) | Ref. |
|---|---|---|---|---|
| 2011 (8th) | Portal 2 | Valve | | |
| 2011 (8th) | Batman: Arkham City | Rocksteady Studios | Warner Bros. Interactive Entertainment | |
| 2011 (8th) | L.A. Noire | Team Bondi | Rockstar Games | |
| 2011 (8th) | LittleBigPlanet 2 | Media Molecule | Sony Computer Entertainment | |
| 2011 (8th) | Super Mario 3D Land | Nintendo EAD | Nintendo | |
| 2011 (8th) | The Elder Scrolls V: Skyrim | Bethesda Game Studios | Bethesda Softworks | |
| 2012 (9th) | Journey | Thatgamecompany | Sony Computer Entertainment | |
| 2012 (9th) | Borderlands 2 | Gearbox Software | 2K Games | |
| 2012 (9th) | Dishonored | Arkane Studios | Bethesda Softworks | |
| 2012 (9th) | Far Cry 3 | Ubisoft Montreal | Ubisoft | |
| 2012 (9th) | The Walking Dead | Telltale Games | | |
| 2012 (9th) | XCOM: Enemy Unknown | Firaxis Games | 2K Games | |
| 2013 (10th) | Grand Theft Auto V | Rockstar North | Rockstar Games | |
| 2013 (10th) | Assassin's Creed IV: Black Flag | Ubisoft Montreal | Ubisoft | |
| 2013 (10th) | The Last of Us | Naughty Dog | Sony Computer Entertainment | |
| 2013 (10th) | Papers, Please | 3909 | | |
| 2013 (10th) | Tearaway | Media Molecule | Sony Computer Entertainment | |
| 2013 (10th) | Tomb Raider | Crystal Dynamics | Square Enix | |
| 2014 (11th) | Middle-earth: Shadow of Mordor | Monolith Productions | Warner Bros. Interactive Entertainment | |
| 2014 (11th) | Alien: Isolation | The Creative Assembly | Sega | |
| 2014 (11th) | Destiny | Bungie | Activision | |
| 2014 (11th) | Far Cry 4 | Ubisoft Montreal | Ubisoft | |
| 2014 (11th) | Hearthstone: Heroes of Warcraft | Blizzard Entertainment | Blizzard Entertainment | |
| 2014 (11th) | Threes! | Sirvo | | |
| 2015 (12th) | Bloodborne | FromSoftware | Sony Computer Entertainment | |
| 2015 (12th) | Grow Home | Ubisoft Reflections | Ubisoft | |
| 2015 (12th) | Her Story | Sam Barlow | Sam Barlow | |
| 2015 (12th) | Lovers in a Dangerous Spacetime | Asteroid Base | Asteroid Base | |
| 2015 (12th) | Rocket League | Psyonix | Psyonix | |
| 2015 (12th) | The Witcher 3: Wild Hunt | CD Projekt Red | CD Projekt | |
| 2016 (13th) | Inside | Playdead | | |
| 2016 (13th) | Battlefield 1 | EA DICE | Electronic Arts | |
| 2016 (13th) | Dishonored 2 | Arkane Studios | Bethesda Softworks | |
| 2016 (13th) | Overwatch | Blizzard Entertainment | Blizzard Entertainment | |
| 2016 (13th) | Titanfall 2 | Respawn Entertainment | Electronic Arts | |
| 2016 (13th) | The Witness | Thekla, Inc. | | |
| 2017 (14th) | Super Mario Odyssey | Nintendo EPD | Nintendo | |
| 2017 (14th) | Assassin's Creed Origins | Ubisoft Montreal | Ubisoft | |
| 2017 (14th) | Horizon Zero Dawn | Guerrilla Games | Sony Interactive Entertainment Europe | |
| 2017 (14th) | The Legend of Zelda: Breath of the Wild | Nintendo EPD | Nintendo | |
| 2017 (14th) | NieR: Automata | PlatinumGames | Square Enix | |
| 2017 (14th) | What Remains of Edith Finch | Giant Sparrow | Annapurna Interactive | |
| 2018 (15th) | Return of the Obra Dinn | Lucas Pope | 3909 | |
| 2018 (15th) | Astro Bot Rescue Mission | Japan Studio | Sony Interactive Entertainment Europe | |
| 2018 (15th) | God of War | Santa Monica Studio | Sony Interactive Entertainment Europe | |
| 2018 (15th) | Celeste | Matt Makes Games Inc. | | |
| 2018 (15th) | Into the Breach | Subset Games | | |
| 2018 (15th) | Minit | JW, Kitty, Jukio, and Dom | Devolver Digital | |
| 2019 (16th) | Outer Wilds | Mobius Digital | Annapurna Interactive | |
| 2019 (16th) | Baba Is You | Arvi Teikari | Hempuli Oy | |
| 2019 (16th) | Control | Remedy Entertainment | 505 Games | |
| 2019 (16th) | Disco Elysium | ZA/UM | | |
| 2019 (16th) | Sekiro: Shadows Die Twice | FromSoftware | Activision | |
| 2019 (16th) | Wattam | Funomena | Annapurna Interactive | |
| 2020 (17th) | Hades | Supergiant Games | | |
| 2020 (17th) | Animal Crossing: New Horizons | Nintendo EPD | Nintendo | |
| 2020 (17th) | Astro's Playroom | Japan Studio | Sony Interactive Entertainment | |
| 2020 (17th) | Ghost of Tsushima | Sucker Punch Productions | Sony Interactive Entertainment | |
| 2020 (17th) | The Last of Us Part II | Naughty Dog | Sony Interactive Entertainment | |
| 2020 (17th) | Half-Life: Alyx | Valve Corporation | | |
| 2021 (18th) | Inscryption | Daniel Mullins Games | Devolver Digital | |
| 2021 (18th) | Deathloop | Arkane Studios | Bethesda Softworks | |
| 2021 (18th) | Forza Horizon 5 | Playground Games | Xbox Game Studios | |
| 2021 (18th) | It Takes Two | Hazelight Studios | Electronic Arts | |
| 2021 (18th) | Ratchet & Clank: Rift Apart | Insomniac Games | Sony Interactive Entertainment | |
| 2021 (18th) | Returnal | Housemarque | Sony Interactive Entertainment | |
| 2022 (19th) | Vampire Survivors | Poncle | | |
| 2022 (19th) | Elden Ring | FromSoftware | Bandai Namco | |
| 2022 (19th) | God of War Ragnarök | Santa Monica | Sony Interactive Entertainment | |
| 2022 (19th) | Horizon Forbidden West | Guerrilla | Sony Interactive Entertainment | |
| 2022 (19th) | Tunic | Finji | | |
| 2022 (19th) | Cult of the Lamb | Massive Monster | Devolver Digital | |
| 2023 (20th) | Dave the Diver | Mintrocket | | |
| 2023 (20th) | Cocoon | Geometric Interactive | Annapurna Interactive | |
| 2023 (20th) | Dredge | Black Salt Games | Team17 | |
| 2023 (20th) | The Legend of Zelda: Tears of the Kingdom | Nintendo | | |
| 2023 (20th) | Marvel's Spider-Man 2 | Insomniac Games | Sony Interactive Entertainment | |
| 2023 (20th) | Viewfinder | Sad Owl Studios | Thunderful Group | |
| 2024 (21st) | Astro Bot | Team Asobi | Sony Interactive Entertainment | |
| 2024 (21st) | Animal Well | Shared Memory | Bigmode | |
| 2024 (21st) | Balatro | LocalThunk | Playstack | |
| 2024 (21st) | Helldivers 2 | Arrowhead Game Studios | Sony Interactive Entertainment | |
| 2024 (21st) | The Legend of Zelda: Echoes of Wisdom | Nintendo EPD, Grezzo | Nintendo | |
| 2024 (21st) | Tactical Breach Wizards | Suspicious Developments | | |
| 2025 (22nd) | Blue Prince | Dogubomb | Raw Fury | |
| 2025 (22nd) | Ball x Pit | Kenny Sun | Devolver Digital | |
| 2025 (22nd) | Clair Obscur: Expedition 33 | Sandfall Interactive | Kepler Interactive | |
| 2025 (22nd) | Ghost of Yōtei | Sucker Punch Productions | Sony Interactive Entertainment | |
| 2025 (22nd) | Hades II | Supergiant Games | | |
| 2025 (22nd) | Split Fiction | Hazelight Studios | Electronic Arts | |

== Multiple nominations and wins ==
=== Developers ===
| Developer | Nominations | Wins |
|---|---|---|
| Nintendo EPD/EAD | 4 | 1 |
| Ubisoft Montreal | 4 | 0 |
| Arkane Studios | 3 | 0 |
| FromSoftware | 3 | 0 |
| Blizzard Entertainment | 2 | 0 |
| Guerrilla Games | 2 | 0 |
| Japan Studio | 2 | 0 |
| Media Molecule | 2 | 0 |
| Naughty Dog | 2 | 0 |
| Santa Monica Studio | 2 | 0 |
| Valve | 2 | 1 |

=== Publishers ===
| Developer | Nominations | Wins |
|---|---|---|
| Sony Computer/Interactive Entertainment | 15 | 2 |
| Ubisoft | 5 | 0 |
| Bethesda Softworks | 4 | 0 |
| Nintendo | 4 | 1 |
| Annapurna Interactive | 3 | 1 |
| Devolver Digital | 3 | 1 |
| Electronic Arts | 3 | 0 |
| 2k Games | 2 | 0 |
| 3909 | 2 | 1 |
| Activision | 2 | 0 |
| Blizzard Entertainment | 2 | 0 |
| Rockstar Games | 2 | 1 |
| Square Enix | 2 | 0 |
| Valve | 2 | 1 |
| Warner Bros Interactive | 2 | 1 |
