= British Academy Games Award for Debut Game =

Award

British Academy Video Games Award for Debut Game
- Awarded for: The best first game from any studio or individual
- Country: United Kingdom
- Presented by: BAFTA
- First award: 2012
- Currently held by: Clair Obscur: Expedition 33 (2025)
- Website: BAFTA Games Awards

The British Academy Video Games Award for Debut Game is an award presented annually by the British Academy of Film and Television Arts (BAFTA). It is given in honor of the best first game from any studio or individual.

Since its inception, the award has been given to eleven games. The category was first presented at the 8th British Academy Video Games Awards ceremony, held in 2012, with the Microsoft Studios-published title Insanely Twisted Shadow Planet as the inagurual recipient. The publishers Annapurna Interactive has received the most nominations in this category with six, followed by Xbox Game Studios with five. To date, no publisher has won in the category more than once.

The current holder of the award is Clair Obscur: Expedition 33, developed by Sandfall Interactive and published by Kepler Interactive, which won at the 22nd British Academy Games Awards in 2026.

== Winners and nominees ==
In the following table, the years are listed as per BAFTA convention, and generally correspond to the year of game release in the United Kingdom.

Table key
Indicates the winner

Year	Game	Developer(s)	Publisher(s)	Ref.
2011 (8th)	Insanely Twisted Shadow Planet	Shadow Planet Productions	Microsoft Studios	
2011 (8th)	Bastion	Supergiant Games	Warner Bros. Interactive Entertainment	
2011 (8th)	Eufloria	Omni Systems	Omni Systems	
2011 (8th)	L.A. Noire	Team Bondi	Rockstar Games	
2011 (8th)	Monstermind	Bossa Studios	Bossa Studios	
2011 (8th)	Rift	Trion Worlds	Trion Worlds	
2012 (9th)	The Unfinished Swan	Giant Sparrow, Santa Monica Studio	Sony Computer Entertainment	
2012 (9th)	Deadlight	Tequila Works	Microsoft Studios	
2012 (9th)	Dear Esther	The Chinese Room	The Chinese Room	
2012 (9th)	Forza Horizon	Playground Games, Turn 10 Studios	Microsoft Studios	
2012 (9th)	Proteus	Ed Key, David Kanaga	Valve	
2012 (9th)	The Room	Fireproof Games	Fireproof Games	
2013 (10th)	Gone Home	Fullbright	Fullbright	
2013 (10th)	Badland	Frogmind Oy	Frogmind Oy	
2013 (10th)	Castles in the Sky	The Tall Trees	The Tall Trees	
2013 (10th)	Gunpoint	Suspicious Developments	Suspicious Developments	
2013 (10th)	Remember Me	Dontnod Entertainment	Capcom	
2013 (10th)	The Stanley Parable	Galactic Cafe	Galactic Cafe	
2014 (11th)	Never Alone	Upper One Game, E-Line Media	E-Line Media	
2014 (11th)	The Banner Saga	Stoic Studios	Versus Evil	
2014 (11th)	CounterSpy	Dynamighty	Sony Computer Entertainment	
2014 (11th)	Hitman Go	Square Enix Montreal	Square Enix	
2014 (11th)	Shovel Knight	Yacht Club Games	Yacht Club Games	
2014 (11th)	The Vanishing of Ethan Carter	The Astronauts	The Astronauts	
2015 (12th)	Her Story	Sam Barlow		
2015 (12th)	Keep Talking and Nobody Explodes	Steel Crate Games	Steel Crate Games	
2015 (12th)	Lovers in a Dangerous Spacetime	Asteroid Base	Asteroid Base	
2015 (12th)	Mini Metro	Dinosaur Polo Club	Dinosaur Polo Club, Playism	
2015 (12th)	Ori and the Blind Forest	Moon Studios	Microsoft Studios	
2015 (12th)	Prune	Joel McDonald	Joel McDonald	
2016 (13th)	Firewatch	Campo Santo	Panic	
2016 (13th)	Overcooked	Ghost Town Games	Team17	
2016 (13th)	Oxenfree	Night School Studio	Night School Studio	
2016 (13th)	That Dragon, Cancer	Numinous Games	Numinous Games	
2016 (13th)	Virginia	Variable State	505 Games	
2016 (13th)	The Witness	Thekla, Inc.	Thekla, Inc.	
2017 (14th)	Gorogoa	Buried Signal	Annapurna Interactive	
2017 (14th)	Cuphead	StudioMDHR Entertainment Inc.	StudioMDHR Entertainment Inc.	
2017 (14th)	Hollow Knight	Team Cherry	Team Cherry	
2017 (14th)	Night in the Woods	InfiniteFall	Finji	
2017 (14th)	The Sexy Brutale	Cavalier Game Studios	Tequila Works	
2017 (14th)	Slime Rancher	Monomi Park	Monomi Park	
2018 (15th)	Yoku's Island Express	Villa Gorilla	Team17	
2018 (15th)	Beat Saber	Beat Games	Beat Games	
2018 (15th)	Cultist Simulator	Weather Factory	Humble Bundle	
2018 (15th)	Donut County	Ben Esposito	Annapurna Interactive	
2018 (15th)	Florence	Mountains	Annapurna Interactive	
2018 (15th)	Gris	Nomada Studio	Devolver Digital	
2019 (16th)	Disco Elysium	ZA/UM		
2019 (16th)	Ape Out	Gabe Cuzzillo	Devolver Digital	
2019 (16th)	Death Stranding	Kojima Productions	Sony Interactive Entertainment	
2019 (16th)	Katana Zero	Askiisoft	Devolver Digital	
2019 (16th)	Knights and Bikes	Foam Sword	Double Fine Presents	
2019 (16th)	Manifold Garden	William Chyr Studios	William Chyr Studios	
2020 (17th)	Carrion	Phobia Game Studio	Devolver Digital	
2020 (17th)	Airborne Kingdom	The Wandering Bard		
2020 (17th)	Call of the Sea	Out of the Blue	Raw Fury Games	
2020 (17th)	Factorio	Wube Software		
2020 (17th)	The Falconeer	Tomas Sala	Wired Productions	
2020 (17th)	Röki	Polygon Treehouse	United Label	
2021 (18th)	Toem	Something We Made		
2021 (18th)	The Artful Escape	Beethoven and Dinosaur	Annapurna Interactive	
2021 (18th)	Eastward	Pixpil	Chucklefish	
2021 (18th)	The Forgotten City	Modern Storyteller	Dear Villagers	
2021 (18th)	Genesis Noir	Feral Cat Den	Fellow Traveller	
2021 (18th)	Maquette	Graceful Decay	Annapurna Interactive	
2022 (19th)	Tunic	Finji		
2022 (19th)	The Case of the Golden Idol	Color Gray Games	Playstack	
2022 (19th)	Stray	BlueTwelve	Annapurna Interactive	
2022 (19th)	Trombone Champ	Holy Wow Studios		
2022 (19th)	As Dusk Falls	Interior Night	Xbox Game Studios	
2022 (19th)	Vampire Survivors	Poncle		
2023 (20th)
2023 (20th)	Venba	Abhi, Sam Elkana, Shahrin Khan	Visai Games	
2023 (20th)	Cocoon	Geometric Interactive	Annapurna Interactive	
2023 (20th)	Dave the Diver	Mintrocket		
2023 (20th)	Dredge	Black Salt Games	Team17	
2023 (20th)	Stray Gods: The Roleplaying Musical	Summerfall Games	Humble Games	
2023 (20th)	Viewfinder	Sad Owl Studios	Thunderful Group	
2024 (21st)
2024 (21st)	Balatro	LocalThunk	Playstack	
2024 (21st)	Animal Well	Shared Memory	Bigmode	
2024 (21st)	Pacific Drive	Ironwood Studios	Kepler Interactive	
2024 (21st)	The Plucky Squire	All Possible Futures	Devolver Digital	
2024 (21st)	Tales of Kenzera: Zau	Surgent Studios	Electronic Arts	
2024 (21st)	Thank Goodness You're Here!	Coal Supper	Panic Inc.	
2025 (22nd)
2025 (22nd)	Clair Obscur: Expedition 33	Sandfall Interactive	Kepler Interactive	
2025 (22nd)	Blue Prince	Dogubomb	Raw Fury	
2025 (22nd)	Consume Me	Jenny Jiao Hsia, AP Thomson	Hexacutable	
2025 (22nd)	Despelote	Julián Cordero, Sebastián Valbuena	Panic	
2025 (22nd)	Dispatch	AdHoc Studio		
2025 (22nd)	The Midnight Walk	MoonHood	Fast Travel Games	

== Multiple nominations ==
The following publishers received two or more Debut Game nominations:

Nominations	Publisher
6	Annapurna Interactive
5	Microsoft/Xbox Game Studios
4	Devolver Digital
3	Sony Computer Entertainment/Sony Interactive Entertainment
2	Finji
