= 2023 in video games =

In the video game industry, 2023 saw significant changes within larger publishers and developers. Microsoft, after having satisfied worldwide regulatory bodies, completed its $69 billion acquisition of Activision Blizzard, making them the third largest game publisher in the world. Embracer Group, which had been in an acquisition spree over the previous few years, had an estimated $2 billion deal fall through, causing many of the studios under Embracer to either lay off staff or close entirely. Similar layoffs were seen at Unity, Amazon, ByteDance, Epic Games, Bungie, and Ubisoft, leading to over 9,000 jobs lost in the industry in 2023 and part of a larger trend of layoffs at technology companies in 2023.

== Financial performance ==
=== Best-selling premium games by region ===
The following titles were 2023's top ten best-selling premium games by region (excluding microtransactions and free-to-play titles) on PC and console platforms, for Japan, the United States, and Europe.

Rank	Japan	United States	Europe
1	The Legend of Zelda: Tears of the Kingdom	Hogwarts Legacy	EA Sports FC 24
2	Super Mario Bros. Wonder	Call of Duty: Modern Warfare III	Hogwarts Legacy
3	Pikmin 4	Madden NFL 24	FIFA 23
4	Pokémon Scarlet and Violet	Marvel's Spider-Man 2	Call of Duty: Modern Warfare III
5	Momotaro Dentetsu World: Chikyuu wa Kibou de Mawatteru!	The Legend of Zelda: Tears of the Kingdom (Note: Not including digital sales)	Grand Theft Auto V
6	Mario Kart 8 Deluxe	Diablo IV	Diablo IV
7	Kirby's Return to Dream Land Deluxe	Call of Duty: Modern Warfare II	The Legend of Zelda: Tears of the Kingdom
8	Dragon Quest Monsters: The Dark Prince	Mortal Kombat 1	Red Dead Redemption 2
9	Splatoon 3	Star Wars Jedi: Survivor	Super Mario Bros. Wonder
10	Super Mario RPG	EA Sports FC 24	Marvel's Spider-Man 2

== Top-rated games ==
=== Critically acclaimed titles ===
The number of highly praised video games released in 2023 was considered unusually high compared to most years, with 25 games having a 90 out of 100 or better aggregate score on Metacritic by October 2023; this made it the best year by number of acclaimed games, the largest since 2004. This year was comparable to the slate of highly praised releases in 1992, 1997 and 2008. The reasons for this include the fact that most of the top games were delayed or not even developed until after the COVID-19 pandemic lockdowns, leading to greater quality in gaming overall, and that the ninth generation of consoles had become entrenched for developers.

The following table lists the top-rated games released in 2023 based on Metacritic, which generally considers expansions as separate entities.

2023 releases scoring 90/100 or higher on Metacritic
Title	Developer(s)	Publisher(s)	Release	Platform(s)	Average score
Baldur's Gate 3	Larian Studios		August 3, 2023	OSX, PS5, WIN, XSX/S	96
The Legend of Zelda: Tears of the Kingdom	Nintendo EPD	Nintendo	May 12, 2023	NS	96
Metroid Prime Remastered	Retro Studios	Nintendo	February 8, 2023	NS	94
Resident Evil 4	Capcom		March 24, 2023	iOS, iPadOS, OSX, PS4, PS5, WIN, XSX/S	93
Street Fighter 6	Capcom		June 2, 2023	Arcade, PS4, PS5, WIN, XSX/S	92
Super Mario Bros. Wonder	Nintendo EPD	Nintendo	October 20, 2023	NS	92
Xenoblade Chronicles 3: Expansion Pass Wave 4 - Future Redeemed	Monolith Soft	Nintendo	April 25, 2023	NS	92
Against the Storm	Eremite Games	Hooded Horse	December 8, 2023	WIN	91
Dave the Diver	Mintrocket		June 28, 2023	OSX, NS, PS4, PS5, WIN	90
Jack Jeanne	Broccoli	Aksys Games	June 15, 2023	DROID, iOS, NS	90
Marvel's Spider-Man 2	Insomniac Games	Sony Interactive Entertainment	October 20, 2023	PS5	90
Slay the Princess	Black Tabby Games		October 23, 2023	LIN, OSX, NS, PS4, PS5, XBO, XSX/S	90
Videoverse	Kinmoku		August 7, 2023	LIN, OSX, WIN	90

=== Major awards ===
Baldur's Gate 3 was the first game to sweep the Game of the Year categories at the five major awards ceremonies: the Golden Joystick Awards, the Game Awards, the D.I.C.E. Awards, the Game Developers Choice Awards, and the BAFTA Games Awards.

Category / Organization		41st Golden Joystick Awards November 20, 2023	The Game Awards 2023 December 7, 2023	27th Annual D.I.C.E. Awards February 15, 2024	24th Game Developers Choice Awards March 20, 2024		20th British Academy Games Awards April 11, 2024
Game of the Year		Baldur's Gate 3					
Independent / Debut (Note: Some award presentations combine these categories.)	Indie	Sea of Stars	Sea of Stars	Cocoon	Venba		
Independent / Debut	Debut	Sea of Stars	Cocoon	Cocoon	Venba		
Mobile		—N/a	Honkai: Star Rail	What the Car?	—N/a		
VR / AR		Horizon Call of the Mountain	Resident Evil Village	Asgard's Wrath 2	—N/a		
Artistic Achievement	Animation	Baldur's Gate 3	Alan Wake 2	Marvel's Spider-Man 2	Alan Wake 2		Hi-Fi Rush
Artistic Achievement	Art Direction	Baldur's Gate 3	Alan Wake 2	Alan Wake 2	Alan Wake 2		Alan Wake 2
Audio	Music	Final Fantasy XVI	Final Fantasy XVI	Marvel's Spider-Man 2	Hi-Fi Rush		Baldur's Gate 3
Audio	Sound Design	Final Fantasy XVI	Hi-Fi Rush	Marvel's Spider-Man 2	Hi-Fi Rush		Alan Wake 2
Character or Performance	Leading Role	Ben Starr as Clive Rosfield; Final Fantasy XVI	Neil Newbon as Astarion; Baldur's Gate 3	Miles Morales; Marvel's Spider-Man 2	—N/a		Nadji Jeter as Miles Morales; Marvel's Spider-Man 2
Character or Performance	Supporting Role	Neil Newbon as Astarion; Baldur's Gate 3	Neil Newbon as Astarion; Baldur's Gate 3	Miles Morales; Marvel's Spider-Man 2	—N/a		Andrew Wincott as Raphael; Baldur's Gate 3
Game Direction or Design	Game Design	—N/a	Alan Wake 2	Baldur's Gate 3	Baldur's Gate 3		Dave the Diver
Game Direction or Design	Game Direction	—N/a	Alan Wake 2	Baldur's Gate 3	Baldur's Gate 3		Dave the Diver
Narrative		Baldur's Gate 3	Alan Wake 2	Baldur's Gate 3			
Technical Achievement		—N/a		Marvel's Spider-Man 2	The Legend of Zelda: Tears of the Kingdom		
Multiplayer / Online		Mortal Kombat 1	Baldur's Gate 3	Diablo IV	—N/a		Super Mario Bros. Wonder
Action		—N/a	Armored Core VI: Fires of Rubicon	Marvel's Spider-Man 2	—N/a		
Adventure		—N/a	The Legend of Zelda: Tears of the Kingdom		—N/a		
Family		—N/a	Super Mario Bros. Wonder		—N/a		Super Mario Bros. Wonder
Fighting		—N/a	Street Fighter 6		—N/a		
Role-Playing		—N/a	Baldur's Gate 3		—N/a		
Sports/Racing	Sports	—N/a	Forza Motorsport	MLB The Show 23	—N/a		
Sports/Racing	Racing	—N/a	Forza Motorsport	Forza Motorsport	—N/a		
Strategy/Simulation		—N/a	Pikmin 4	Dune: Spice Wars	—N/a		
Social Impact		—N/a	Tchia	—N/a	Venba		Tchia
Special Award		—N/a		Hall of Fame	Ambassador Award	Lifetime Achievement	BAFTA Special
Special Award		—N/a		Koji Kondo	Fawzi Mesmar	Yoko Shimomura	SpecialEffect

== Major events ==
Date	Event	Ref.
January 6	NetEase Games acquired SkyBox Labs.	
January 17	Unity Technologies laid off 284 employees.	
January 18	Google's cloud streaming service Stadia closed, with all hardware and software purchases being refunded.	
February 8	Nintendo Switch Online adds Game Boy & Game Boy Color titles to its library of emulated games. Game Boy Advance titles were also added to the service (exclusive to the Expansion Pack subscription).	
February 17	Super Nintendo World opened to the public in Universal Studios Hollywood in California.	
February 21–23	Academy of Interactive Arts & Sciences hosted the 2023 D.I.C.E. Summit and the 26th Annual D.I.C.E. Awards at the Resorts World Las Vegas in Las Vegas, Nevada. Tim Schafer inducted into the AIAS Hall of Fame.	
March 20–24	The Game Developers Conference returned to an all-physical format at the Moscone Center in San Francisco.	
March 22	Atari announced its intent to acquire Nightdive Studios for $10 million.	
March 27	Nintendo closed the Nintendo eShop for the Nintendo 3DS and Wii U.	
March 29	Electronic Arts laid off about 800 staff.	
March 30	The Entertainment Software Association announced that E3 2023 was cancelled due to lack of major publisher attendance.	
April 3	Legendary Entertainment secured TV and film rights of Capcom's Street Fighter franchise.	
April 5	Savvy Games Group announced its intent to acquire Scopely for $4.9 billion.	
April 19	Epic Games acquired Brazil-based studio Aquiris.	
April 20	Focus Entertainment acquired publisher studio Dovetail Games.	
April 20	Sony Interactive Entertainment acquired Firewalk Studios under its PlayStation Studios label.	
May 3	Unity Technologies announced plans to cut 600 jobs.	
June 5	Apple announced the Apple Vision Pro, a mixed reality headset, set to release in early 2024.	
June 8–11	Summer Game Fest 2023 was held through a combination of various in-person and streamed video events from over forty publishing partners at the YouTube Theater in Inglewood, California.	
June 14	Embracer Group began undergoing a large-scale restructuring program due to the failure of a planned US$2 billion deal, which would affect some of its studios and ongoing projects.	
June 25	The Hollywood Bowl Orchestra performed a 10-year anniversary concert for The Game Awards, an end-of-the-year awards ceremony that has been running since 2014, at the Hollywood Bowl in Los Angeles.	
July 24	Tencent announced its intent to acquire majority shares of Techland.	
August 10–12	Quakecon returned as a live in-person event in Grapevine, Texas, following three years of digital formats due to the COVID-19 pandemic.	
August 11–13	The 2023 Pokémon World Championships took place at the Pacifico Yokohama convention center in Yokohama, Japan.	
August 18	Sega Sammy Group completed the acquisition of Rovio Entertainment for US$775M.	
August 21	Nintendo announced that Charles Martinet would be stepping back from recording voices for Mario, Luigi, and other characters.	
August 23–27	The Gamescom convention took place at the Koelnmesse in Cologne, Germany.	
August 31	As part of its restructuring, Embracer Group shuttered Volition.	
September 1–4	Nintendo of America hosted Nintendo Live, an in-person event that was introduced in Japan back in 2017, in Seattle.	
September 7	The ESA announced that there would be no E3 in 2024.	
September 13	Unity Technologies announced a new retroactive licensing fee for the Unity game engine to start in 2024, generating backlash within the indie game community. The criticism led Unity to rework the fee structure to less-aggressive terms one week later.	
September 21–24	The Tokyo Game Show convention took place at the Makuhari Messe in Chiba, Japan.	
September 27	Jim Ryan, CEO of Sony Interactive Entertainment, announced his intent to leave Sony by April 2024.	
September 28	Epic Games laid off about 16% of its workforce, approximately 850 employees, including divestment of Bandcamp and SuperAwesome.	
October 4	Nintendo announced that the online services for Nintendo 3DS and Wii U software will discontinue in early April 2024.	
October 13	The acquisition of Activision Blizzard by Microsoft was completed following approval from the United Kingdom's Competition and Markets Authority.	
October 13	Kevin Afghani was announced to be replacing Charles Martinet as the voice of Mario and Luigi.	
October 30	Bungie laid off about 100 employees as part of cost-cutting measures due to lower player counts of Destiny 2.	
October 31	Atari announced its intent to acquire Digital Eclipse for $20 million.	
November 3–4	Blizzard Entertainment hosted BlizzCon, an in-person event, at the Anaheim Convention Center in California.	
November 7	Ubisoft laid off 124 employees worldwide, most from its Canadian studios.	
November 8	Blizzard Entertainment announced its intent to transition the Overwatch League into a more traditional esports structure.	
November 15	Series of layoffs were announced at Amazon Games, Digital Bros, Humble Games, and Kongregate.	
November 28	Unity Technologies announced another set of layoffs consisting of 3.8% or 265 employees as part of a company "reset" following its licensing changes in September 2023.	
December 7	The Game Awards 2023 was held at the Peacock Theater in Los Angeles.	
December 11	Free Radical Design was shut down as part of the fallout from Embracer Group's failed $2 billion deal.	
December 11	Google was found to have maintained an illegal monopoly in the Android market by a jury trial in Epic Games v. Google.	
December 12	The ESA confirmed that they would no longer hold E3 trade shows for the foreseeable future.	
December 15	Activision Blizzard and the California Civil Rights Department agreed to a $54 million settlement in the lawsuit into sexual harassment at the company.	
December 19	Insomniac Games suffered a data breach and had its ten-year plans released, as well as personnel information and several historical details around the company and Sony Interactive Entertainment, after failing to pay the hacking group to prevent its release.	
December 29	As part of Microsoft's acquisition, Bobby Kotick retired from Activision Blizzard after being its CEO for 32 years.	

== Notable deaths ==
- January 5
  - Sim Wong Hoo, 67, founder and CEO of Creative Labs.
  - Earl Boen, 81, voice actor across multiple media titles, including for World of Warcraft and Monkey Island.
- January 29 – Annie Wersching, 45, actress known for portraying Tess in The Last of Us and Tassyn in Anthem.
- February 14 – Tohru Okada, 73, musician and creator of the PlayStation logo sound effect.
- February 15 – Shōzō Iizuka, 89, voice actor across multiple media franchises, most notably as the Japanese dub of Doctor Neo Cortex in the Crash Bandicoot series.
- March 3 – Tom Sizemore, 61, actor known for voicing Sonny Forelli in Grand Theft Auto: Vice City.
- March 17 – Lance Reddick, 60, actor known in video games for the voice of Commander Zavala in the Destiny franchise and the voice and performance of Sylens in the Horizon series.
- March 23 – Brendan O'Brien, 60, voice actor for Crash Bandicoot.
- March 30 – Mike Berlyn, 73, game designer and creator of Bubsy, and co-founder of Bend Studio.
- April 1 – Klaus Teuber, 70, creator of Catan.
- July 5 – Emile Morel, 40, game developer for Ubisoft, including lead designer on Rayman Legends and creative lead on Beyond Good and Evil 2.
- July 30 – Paul Reubens, 70, actor known for voicing Lock in The Nightmare Before Christmas: Oogie's Revenge.
- August 23 – Arleen Sorkin, 67, actress known for voicing Harley Quinn in Batman: The Animated Series and its various video game adaptations, as well as in Batman: Arkham Asylum.
- August 24 – Bray Wyatt, 36, pro wrestler who appeared in the WWE 2K titles (WWE '12, WWE 2K15-2K20, 2K23-2K24).
- October 26 – Richard Moll, 80, actor known for voicing Devil Hulk in The Incredible Hulk: Ultimate Destruction and Death in Dante's Inferno.
- October 28 – Matthew Perry, 54, actor known for voicing Benny in Fallout: New Vegas.
- November 19 – Peter Spellos, 69, actor known for voicing Rojie in Seven Samurai 20XX and Michael in Star Ocean: Second Evolution.
- December 17 – James McCaffrey, 65, actor with several voice roles, including Max Payne.
- December 24 – Kamar de los Reyes, 56, actor known for portraying Raul Menendez in Call of Duty: Black Ops II.
- December 30
  - Bryan Ansell, 68, game designer and manager of Games Workshop, and co-developer of the Warhammer 40,000 franchise.
  - Tom Wilkinson, 75, actor known for portraying Carmine Falcone in Batman Begins and its video game adaptation, and secondary antagonist Thomas Pendrew in Sleeping Dogs.

== Hardware releases ==
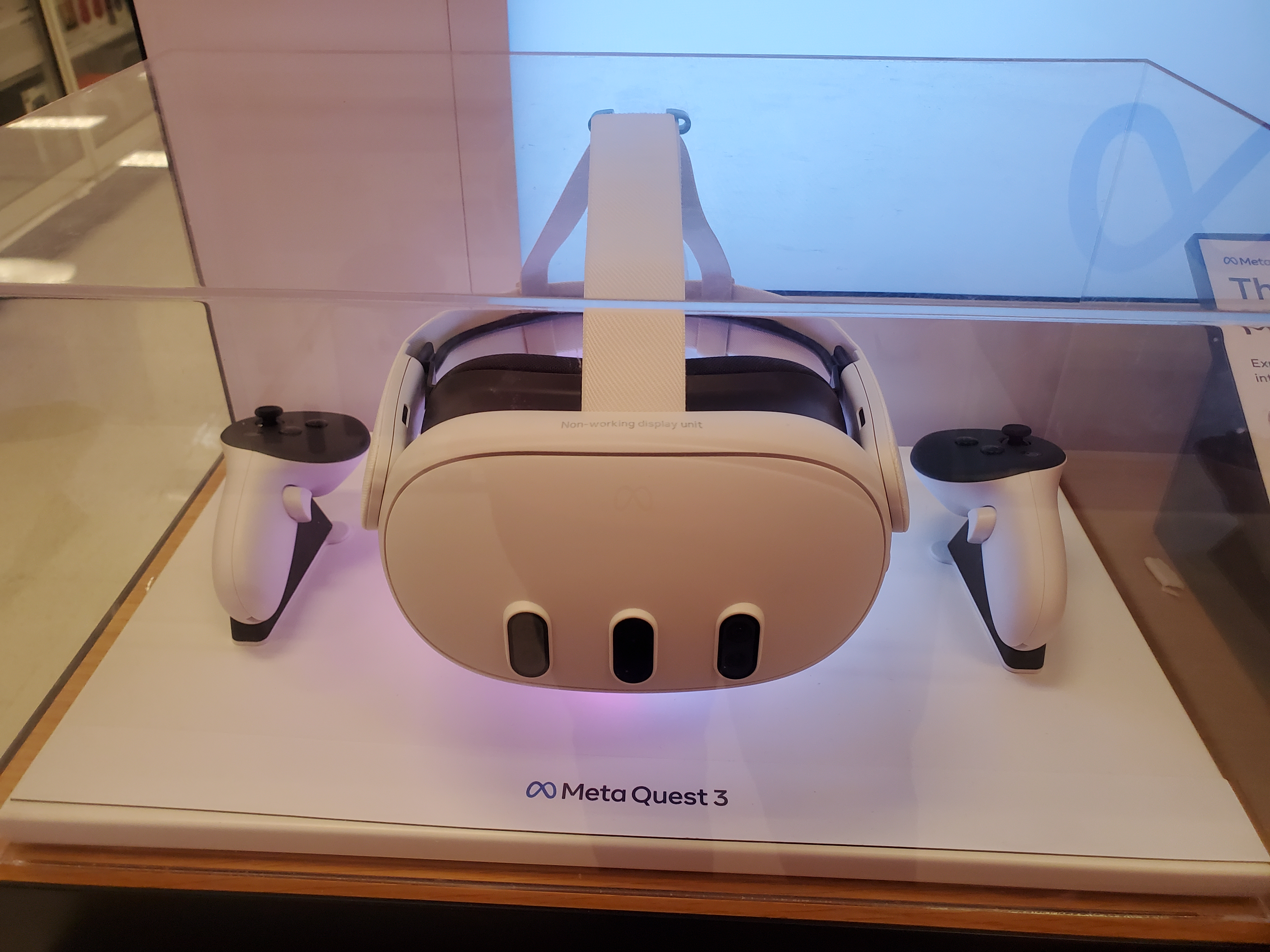
Meta Quest 3

Date	Console	Manufacturer	Ref.
January 26	Razer Edge	Razer Inc.	
February	HTC Vive XR Elite	HTC	
February 22	PlayStation VR2	Sony	
June 13	Asus ROG Ally	Asus	
October 10	Meta Quest 3	Reality Labs	
October 31	Lenovo Legion Go	Lenovo	
November 10	PlayStation 5 Slim	Sony	
November 15	PlayStation Portal	Sony	
November 16	Steam Deck OLED	Valve Corporation	
November 17	Atari 2600+	Atari, Plaion	

== Cancelled games ==
- Battlefield Mobile, Electronic Arts (iOS, DROID)
- Evil Dead: The Game, Saber Interactive (NS)
- Hyenas, Sega (WIN, PS4, PS5, XBO, XSX/S)
- Just Cause Mobile, Square Enix (iOS, DROID)
- The Last of Us Online, Naughty Dog (PS5)
- Marvel's Midnight Suns, 2K (NS)
- Metal Black S-Tribute, City Connection (NS, PS4)
- Quantamancy: The Purgatory, Corecell Technology (WIN, PS4, PS5, XBO, XSX/S)
- Revenant Hill, Finji (WIN, PS4, PS5)

== Discontinued games ==
- The Day Before, Fntastic (WIN)
- Them's Fighting Herds, Mane6 (WIN, NS, PS4, PS5, XBO, XSX/S)
- Second Extinction, Avalanche Studios (WIN, XBO, XSX/S)

== Video game-based film and television releases ==
Title	Release / premiere date	Type	Distributor(s)	Franchise(s)	Original game publisher(s)	Ref.
The Legend of Heroes: Trails of Cold Steel – Northern War	January 6, 2023	Anime television series	Tokyo MX (Japan)	Trails	Nihon Falcom (Japan); Xseed Games (worldwide)	
Nier: Automata Ver1.1a	January 8, 2023	Anime television series	Tokyo MX (Japan)	Drakengard	Square Enix	
The Last of Us	January 15, 2023	Television series	HBO (United States)	The Last of Us	Sony Interactive Entertainment	
Tetris	March 31, 2023	Biopic film	Apple TV+	Tetris	Atari Games	
Alice Gear Aegis Expansion	April 3, 2023	Anime television series	Tokyo MX (Japan); Hidive (worldwide except Asia)	Alice Gear Aegis	Colopl	
The Super Mario Bros. Movie	April 5, 2023	CGI animated film	Universal Pictures	Mario	Nintendo	
Pokémon Horizons: The Series	April 14, 2023 (Note: The series made its VOD debut on March 7, 2024, on Netflix.)	Anime television series	TV Tokyo (Japan); Netflix (United States)	Pokémon	Nintendo; The Pokémon Company	
Raid: Call of the Arbiter	May 18, 2023	Limited animated webseries	YouTube	Raid: Shadow Legends	Plarium Games	
Atelier Ryza: Ever Darkness & the Secret Hideout	July 1, 2023	Anime television series	Tokyo MX (Japan)	Atelier	Gust Co. Ltd. (Japan); Koei Tecmo (worldwide)	
Resident Evil: Death Island	July 7, 2023	CGI animated film	Sony Pictures Home Entertainment	Resident Evil	Capcom	
Twisted Metal	July 27, 2023	Television series	Peacock	Twisted Metal	Sony Interactive Entertainment	
The Sounds of Nightmares	August 22, 2023	Podcast series	YouTube	Little Nightmares	Bandai Namco Entertainment	
Gran Turismo	August 25, 2023	Feature film	Sony Pictures	Gran Turismo	Sony Interactive Entertainment	
Pokémon: Paldean Winds	September 6, 2023	Limited animated webseries	YouTube	Pokémon	Nintendo; The Pokémon Company	
Castlevania: Nocturne	September 28, 2023	Animated television series	Netflix	Castlevania	Konami	
Shangri-La Frontier	October 1, 2023	Anime television series	TBS (Japan); Crunchyroll (worldwide)	—N/a	—N/a	
Arknights: Perish in Frost	October 6, 2023	Anime television series	TV Tokyo (Japan); Crunchyroll (worldwide)	Arknights	Hypergryph (China); Yostar (worldwide)	
Good Night World	October 12, 2023	Anime series	Netflix	—N/a	—N/a	
Mortal Kombat Legends: Cage Match	October 17, 2023	Animated film	Warner Bros. Home Entertainment	Mortal Kombat	Midway Games	
Captain Laserhawk: A Blood Dragon Remix	October 19, 2023	Anime series	Netflix	Far Cry	Ubisoft	
Fill Your Pocket with Adventure	October 19, 2023	Television series	TV Tokyo (Japan)	Pokémon	Nintendo; The Pokémon Company	
Detective Pikachu & the Mystery of the Missing Flan	October 25, 2023	Animated short film	YouTube	Detective Pikachu; Pokémon	Nintendo; The Pokémon Company	
Five Nights at Freddy's	October 27, 2023	Feature film	Universal Pictures	Five Nights at Freddy's	Scott Cawthon	
Onimusha	November 2, 2023	Anime series	Netflix	Onimusha	Capcom	
Pokémon Concierge	December 28, 2023	Stop-motion animated series	Netflix	Pokémon	Nintendo; The Pokémon Company	

== See also ==
- 2023 in esports
- 2023 in games
