= Chants of Sennaar =

- Developer: Rundisc
- Publisher: Focus Entertainment
- Designers: Julien Moya; Thomas Panuel
- Programmer: Thomas Panuel
- Artists: Julien Moya; Rachelle "Lillycat" Bartel
- Composer: Thomas Brunet
- Engine: Unity
- Platforms: Nintendo Switch; PlayStation 4; Windows; Xbox One; Android; iOS
- Release: Switch, PlayStation 4, Windows, Xbox One; WW: 5 September 2023; Android, iOS; WW: 26 August 2025
- Genre: Adventure
- Mode: Single-player

Chants of Sennaar is a 2023 adventure video game developed by Rundisc and published by Focus Entertainment. It was released for the Nintendo Switch, PlayStation 4, Windows, and Xbox One on 5 September 2023. The game is inspired by Heaven's Vault and Captain Blood. The gameplay mostly involves solving puzzles and minigames which generally require decoding and understanding the fictional languages of the tower. It also features occasional sections of stealth gameplay. The plot is inspired by the Tower of Babel myth, and the player translates between various different tribes that do not understand each other.

The game received generally favorable reviews from critics who praised its design and puzzles, and The New York Times named it one of its top ten games of 2023.

== Gameplay ==
The player-protagonist, referred to as "the Traveler" by the developers, explores a structure full of people who speak fictional languages, represented by logographic writing systems. Encountered languages must be translated using clues such as non-verbal communication used by non-player characters, illustrated signs, or other contextual clues. The player is aided by a notebook that contains the list of graphemes the player has encountered up to that point, and they may type in a word they assume is the meaning for a grapheme, which is then displayed above that grapheme the next time they encounter it. Once the player encounters enough graphemes, the notebook offers tests to see if a player has correctly translated the graphemes by displaying drawings of nouns, verbs or adjectives which the player must match the correct grapheme to; if the player correctly matches all graphemes to meanings on the page, those graphemes will be considered solved, and their real meaning will be displayed above them. If all graphemes from a sentence are solved, a full translation is shown. As the player progresses higher through the tower, they encounter new languages that must be translated.

Dialog from one of the abstract languages in Chants of Sennaar

Different languages have different writing systems and different language characteristics: some languages signify plural by repeating the word (e.g. "doors" is written as "door door"), while others have a separate grapheme for marking the previous or next noun as plural (e.g. "[plural] door" or "door [plural]"). Different languages also can have differing syntax, putting the predicate and subject in different places of a sentence. The graphemes themselves may also provide hints towards the meaning, with languages having determinatives (e.g. verbs, or nouns that involve humans).

Some areas introduce stealth gameplay; if the player is caught, they are sent to the entrance of the area, where they may try again.

== Plot ==
The Traveler awakens from a sarcophagus situated at the ground level of a large spiraling ziggurat. Through exploring the mysterious structure, they find that every level is home to a distinct caste of people with their own culture and language. The Traveler must decipher each caste's language, using the knowledge gained to help them ascend to the next level.

First, they encounter the Devotees, who wish to climb the high tower to be closer to God. The Devotees are blocked by the imposing Warriors, who have a sworn duty to drive away those they consider "impure," while awaiting a message from the revered Bards on the level above. The Bards celebrate beauty and the arts, though their hedonistic lifestyle is only possible through the involuntary servitude of some of their members. They mock the Warriors beneath them and the very idea of ascending further up the tower, as a deadly monster is said to devour those who try. The Traveler is able to elude the monster and find the Alchemists, a group of miners and scientists conducting esoteric research to unlock a giant gate created by beings they call Fairies. The Traveler then has to discover how to unlock the giant gate to reach the highest level, where the tower's mythical creators reside.

Beyond the gate, the Traveler finds the technologically advanced Anchorites, who wear virtual reality headsets at all times, shutting themselves away from the rest of the tower which they consider doomed. In a secret chamber, one of the Anchorites explains that their people built the tower long ago and were its first residents. Others then arrived and populated the lower levels, but would not communicate due to fear and misunderstanding, thus forming the castes. The Anchorites live in self-imposed exile, a state of detachment perpetuated by their computer system's AI called Exile, which artificially prolongs their lifespans and attempts to preserve the static status quo. The Traveler discovers they were created to reconnect the castes; they are then tasked with dismantling Exile and translating between the castes using communication terminals on each level.

Through the Traveler's efforts, the Devotees win over the Warriors by playing music and invite the Bards' slaves down to their abbey; the Warriors assist the Alchemists in dealing with the monster; the Alchemists teach the Bards about their shared ancestry and help the Devotees with their dying plants; and the Bards perform a concert for the Warriors. Eventually, the Anchorites are able to connect with the other castes through the terminals as well.

Nearing the end of their mission, the Traveler is captured by the Exile AI as they attempt to climb to the highest point of the tower. The Traveler reawakens and finds a ceremonial altar, but it does not activate. The game seemingly ends with the Traveler's disappointment, restarting at the sarcophagus. This time, however, the world has a glitched, uncanny quality to it, devoid of most characters and appearing damaged. The Traveler traverses the tower again, while Exile attempts to torment them, but the Traveler eventually manages to break free from Exile's virtual reality and defeat Exile.

Upon returning to the real world, they find the Anchorites now disconnected from their headsets, socializing with one another and expressing gratitude. Resuming their mission, the Traveler is finally able to activate the altar at the tower's peak, with several others in observance. The altar lights up and reveals that the graphemes representing ideals of each caste (God, Duty, Beauty, Transformation, Exile) in their respective languages are in fact the same grapheme rotated in 3D. The game ends with members of all castes on top of the tower conversing, having overcome the language barrier.

== Development ==
Chants of Sennaar was developed by independent French studio Rundisc, consisting of Julien Moya (art direction and game design) and Thomas Panuel (code and game design). Moya's wife, Rachelle Bartel, provided the illustrations for the language journal at this stage. Panuel and Moya had previously created Varion, released in 2018. While it had few sales, they felt it demonstrated their ability to develop and release a game on their own.

Chants emerged at the start of the COVID-19 pandemic in March 2020. Initially, they wanted to have a game about a protagonist that used stealth, but Moya played Heaven's Vault, a 2019 game with a similar mechanic around language deciphering, and the 1988 game Captain Blood. With Heaven's Vault, the pair felt that they could better implement such a system into their game. Additional games that inspired the puzzle-solving aspects of Chants included Return of the Obra Dinn, Outer Wilds and The Talos Principle. While the narrative was inspired by the Tower of Babel, the direction of their narrative was based on the blind men and an elephant parable, where individuals only have access to parts of the whole of information they need.

The visual design was influenced by a range of cultures, movements and artists, as Moya said "We knew the ancient city had to be covered in architectural marvels and labyrinthian side paths". Among the architectures they used included brutalist, Indian, sub-Saharan, industrial, and art deco, as well as Romanesque and Gothic structures right near Toulouse, France. From artists including Thierry Urbain, François Schuiten Jean Giraud, and Philippe Druillet, Moya said "We immersed ourselves in their work, and learned how to play with radical colors." Additionally, they used the isometric approach and strangeness of several adventure games from the 1980s, including La Abadía del Crimen, Get Dexter, Knight Lore, and Fairlight, as part of their level design for Chants.

They worked on Chants of Sennaar over the next year and a half. They brought it to the 2021 Gamescom convention, seeking out a publisher to help with marketing. Focus Entertainment saw potential in the game and offered to help fund the rest of the game's development. With the extra funding, they were able to bring a freelance sound designer to help add sounds and music to the game over the next two years.

Chants of Sennaar was released for the Nintendo Switch, PlayStation 4, Windows, and Xbox One on 5 September 2023, and for iOS and Android on 26 August 2025.

With the success of Chants, Focus renewed their contract with Rundisc for their next game in June 2024, which will be another original intellectual property.

== Reception ==
Reception

Aggregate score
Aggregator	Score
Metacritic	(NS) 84/100 (PC) 85/100 (PS4) 78/100 (XONE) 86/100

Review scores
Publication	Score
Digital Trends	4.5/5
Edge	9/10
Eurogamer	4/5
Nintendo Life	7/10
Polygon	Recommended
Push Square	8/10
The Games Machine (Italy)	8.4/10

Chants of Sennaar received positive reviews on Metacritic. Eurogamer likened it to innovative Amiga games and called it "a fascinating, thoughtful game". Although Polygon found the puzzles occasionally frustrating, they said, "When Chants of Sennaar is on a roll, there's really nothing else like it." Hardcore Gamer praised its concept and called it "immensely clever and unique". They especially liked the epiphany of solving what words mean and learning about the different cultures. Digital Trends praised what they felt were "ingenious puzzles", "thoughtfully built languages", an "engrossing setting", and "striking art style". They ultimately selected it as an editors' choice. Commenting on its lack of pleasurable hooks, Slant Magazine described Chants of Sennaar as "an interesting and impressive game that ultimately feels more than a bit academic". Push Square "highly recommended" the game, which they found "terrifically unique", though they found the stealth sequences irritating.

Zachary Small of The New York Times named Chants of Sennaar as one of his top ten games for 2023.

=== Awards ===
Awards and nominations for Chants of Sennaar
Year	Award	Category	Result	Ref.
2023	Golden Joystick Awards	Xbox Game of the Year	Nominated	
2023	The Game Awards	Games for Impact	Nominated	
2024	The Steam Awards	Best Soundtrack	Nominated	
2024	New York Game Awards	Off Broadway Award for Best Indie Game	Won	
2024	New York Game Awards	Statue of Liberty Award for Best World	Nominated	
2024	Independent Games Festival	Seumas McNally Grand Prize	Honorable mention	
2024	Independent Games Festival	Excellence in Visual Art	Honorable mention	
2024	Independent Games Festival	Excellence in Design	Nominated	
2024	20th British Academy Games Awards	Game Beyond Entertainment	Nominated	
2024	20th British Academy Games Awards	New Intellectual Property	Nominated	
2024	Nebula Awards	Best Game Writing	Nominated	
2024	Hugo Awards	Best Game or Interactive Work	Nominated	
