= 20th British Academy Games Awards =

Game award ceremony in 2024

- Date: 11 April 2024
- Location: Queen Elizabeth Hall
- Hosted by: Phil Wang
- Best Game: Baldur's Gate 3
- Most awards: Baldur's Gate 3 (5)
- Most nominations: Baldur's Gate 3 (11)

The 20th British Academy Video Game Awards were hosted by the British Academy of Film and Television Arts on 11 April 2024 to honour the best video games of 2023. Held at the Queen Elizabeth Hall in London, the ceremony was hosted by comedian Phil Wang for the first time. Nominations were announced on March 7, 2024, with epic fantasy roleplaying game Baldur's Gate 3 earning a leading eleven nominations. Charity SpecialEffect was honoured with the BAFTA Special Award for their work in making gaming more accessible to people with physical disabilities. Baldur's Gate 3 received the most wins at the ceremony, with five including Best Game.

== Background ==
=== Eligibility ===
Any game released between 10 December 2022 and 24 November 2023 was eligible for nomination.

=== Awards changes ===
For the 20th BAFTA Games Awards, a number of changes were announced:

- Voting opened on 1 June 2023, three months earlier than the previous ceremony.
- Submissions for the awards are now encouraged within 30 days of launch, with developers and publishers who submit their games within this window being charged half the price of a regular submission. BAFTA advised that this is to give members more time to play each of the submissions and to encourage them to play games that they normally wouldn't, with BAFTA chair Tara Saunders stating that "our goal is to allow more people to play a broader selection of titles ahead of the first round voting and continue to make the awards as representative of the industry as we can."
- British Academy Games Award for Original Property was renamed to New Intellectual Property.
- Winners of Best Game and British Game are now selected by the entire BAFTA Games membership, with all 1000+ members being invited to vote. Previously, the winners of these categories were decided by a jury of industry experts. All other categories will continue to be decided by juries, with Saunders explaining that "juries only allow for a small amount of the membership to be involved, so the changes we've made are to be more inclusive to all members. Jury discussions are especially great when they are focused around a specific craft or element of a game, like animation, art direction, audio, and so on. We feel it's important to continue to build specialist juries of highly-skilled talent that know the award category inside out and this will continue to be an important part of the awards process for us. Although award categories like Best Game and British Game still work in the jury format, by going back out to all members, it will have a positive impact on overall membership engagement and bring wider opinions into awards. They are all qualified to give input and we trust our members to vote wisely and with consideration to uphold the quality that the BAFTA games awards is already known for in the industry."

=== Longlist ===
On 14 December 2023, BAFTA released their official longlist for the first time, featuring over sixty games across their seventeen categories. Larian Studios' epic fantasy RPG Baldur's Gate 3 lead longlist appearances, with fifteen, followed by Remedy Entertainment's survival horror game Alan Wake II, which is longlisted fourteen times. Other top performing games include Insomniac's action-adventure game Spider-Man 2 which received ten appearances, and Avalanche Software's fantasy action-RPG Hogwarts Legacy which featured nine times. Regarding the decision to reveal the longlist to the public, rather than informing developers and publishers directly that their game has been longlisted as they have in the past, Saunders stated that "by now doing so, we hope this transparency will recognise and shine a light on a wider selection of games ahead of the jury and round two vote stages".

20th BAFTA Games Awards Longlist
- Animation: Alan Wake II, Assassin's Creed Mirage, Baldur's Gate 3, Final Fantasy XVI, Hi-Fi Rush, Hogwarts Legacy, The Legend of Zelda: Tears of the Kingdom, Marvel's Spider-Man 2, Star Wars Jedi: Survivor, Super Mario Bros. Wonder
- Artistic Achievement: Alan Wake II, Baldur's Gate 3, Cocoon, Diablo IV, Final Fantasy XVI, Hi-Fi Rush, Hogwarts Legacy, Hogwarts Legacy, The Legend of Zelda: Tears of the Kingdom, Marvel's Spider-Man 2, Super Mario Bros. Wonder
- Audio Achievement: Alan Wake II, Assassin's Creed Mirage, Baldur's Gate 3, Call of Duty: Modern Warfare III, Final Fantasy XVI, Hi-Fi Rush, The Legend of Zelda: Tears of the Kingdom, Marvel's Spider-Man 2, Star Wars Jedi: Survivor
- Best Game: Alan Wake II, Baldur's Gate 3, Cocoon, Dave the Diver, Dredge, Hogwarts Legacy, The Legend of Zelda: Tears of the Kingdom, Marvel's Spider-Man 2, Star Wars Jedi: Survivor, Super Mario Bros. Wonder
- British Game: Cassette Beasts, Dead Island 2, Disney Illusion Island, EA Sports WRC, F1 23, Football Manager 2024, The Texas Chain Saw Massacre, Tron: Identity, Viewfinder, Warhammer Age of Sigmar: Realms of Ruin
- Debut Game: Atomic Heart, Cocoon, Dave the Diver, Dredge, En Garde, Lords of the Fallen, Planet of Lana, Stray Gods: The Roleplaying Musical, Venba, Viewfinder
- Evolving Game: Battlefield 2042, Cyberpunk 2077, Final Fantasy XIV Online, Fortnite, Forza Horizon 5, Genshin Impact, Mario Kart 8 Deluxe, No Man's Sky, PowerWash Simulator, Sea of Thieves
- Family: Bluey: The Videogame, Cocoon, Dave the Diver, Disney Illusion Island, EA Sports FC 24, Hi-Fi Rush, Hogwarts Legacy, Lego 2K Drive, Sonic Superstars, Super Mario Bros. Wonder
- Game Beyond Entertainment: Chants of Sennaar, Deliver Us Mars, Goodbye Volcano High, Jusant, The Making of Karateka, Tchia, Terra Nil, Thirsty Suitors, Venba, Viewfinder
- Game Design: Alan Wake II, Baldur's Gate 3, Cocoon, Dave the Diver, Dredge, Hogwarts Legacy, The Legend of Zelda: Tears of the Kingdom, Marvel's Spider-Man 2, Super Mario Bros. Wonder, Viewfinder
- Multiplayer: Baldur's Gate 3, Call of Duty: Modern Warfare III, Diablo IV, EA Sports FC 24, Forza Motorsport, Lego 2K Drive, Mortal Kombat 1, Party Animals, Super Mario Bros. Wonder
- Music: Alan Wake II, Assassin's Creed Mirage, Baldur's Gate 3, Diablo IV, Final Fantasy XVI, Hi-Fi Rush, Hogwarts Legacy, The Legend of Zelda: Tears of the Kingdom, Marvel's Spider-Man 2, Star Wars Jedi: Survivor
- Narrative: Alan Wake II, Baldur's Gate 3, Dave the Diver, Diablo IV, Dredge, Final Fantasy XVI, Hogwarts Legacy, The Legend of Zelda: Tears of the Kingdom, Star Wars Jedi: Survivor, Starfield
- New Intellectual Property: Chants of Sennaar, Cocoon, Dave the Diver, Dredge, Hi-Fi Rush, Jusant, Lies of P, Sea of Stars, Starfield, Viewfinder
- Technical Achievement: Alan Wake II, Baldur's Gate 3, Call of Duty: Modern Warfare III, Final Fantasy XVI, Hogwarts Legacy, Horizon Call of the Mountain, The Legend of Zelda: Tears of the Kingdom, Marvel's Spider-Man 2, Starfield, Viewfinder
- Performer in a Leading Role: Alan Wake II (Ilkka Villi, Matthew Porretta, Melanie Liburd), Baldur's Gate 3 (Amelia Tyler, Neil Newbon, Samantha Béart), Final Fantasy XVI (Ben Starr), Marvel's Spider-Man 2 (Nadji Jeter, Yuri Lowenthal), Star Wars Jedi: Survivor (Cameron Monaghan)
- Performer in a Supporting Role: Alan Wake II (James McCaffrey, Martti Suosalo, Sam Lake), Baldur's Gate 3 (Andrew Wincott, Dave Jones, Tracy Wiles), Cyberpunk 2077 (Idris Elba), Final Fantasy XVI (Ralph Ineson), Marvel's Spider-Man 2 (Tony Todd), Star Wars Jedi: Survivor (Debra Wilson)

== Winners and nominees ==
The nominees were announced on 7 March 2024 via a livestream on the official BAFTA YouTube channel hosted by journalist Lucy James and panelists Isla Hinck, Blessing Adeoye, Jr., Leah Alexandra, and Aoife Wilson.

Best Game (presented by John Romero): Baldur's Gate 3 – Larian Studios; Alan Wake 2 – Remedy Entertainment/Epic Games; Dave the Diver – Mintrocket; The Legend of Zelda: Tears of the Kingdom – Nintendo; Marvel's Spider-Man 2 – Insomniac Games/Sony Interactive Entertainment; Super Mario Bros. Wonder – Nintendo	Animation (presented by Lucy James): Hi-Fi Rush – Tango Gameworks/Bethesda Softworks; Alan Wake 2 – Remedy Entertainment/Epic Games; Hogwarts Legacy – Avalanche Software/Warner Bros. Games; Marvel's Spider-Man 2 – Insomniac Games/Sony Interactive Entertainment; Star Wars Jedi: Survivor – Respawn Entertainment/Electronic Arts; Super Mario Bros. Wonder – Nintendo
Artistic Achievement (presented by Danny Sapani): Alan Wake 2 – Remedy Entertainment/Epic Games; Baldur's Gate 3 – Larian Studios; Cocoon – Geometric Interactive/Annapurna Interactive; Diablo IV – Blizzard Entertainment; Final Fantasy XVI – Square Enix; Hi-Fi Rush – Tango Gameworks/Bethesda Softworks	Audio Achievement (presented by Ellie Gibson): Alan Wake 2 – Remedy Entertainment/Epic Games; Call of Duty: Modern Warfare III – Sledgehammer Games/Activision; Hi-Fi Rush – Tango Gameworks/Bethesda Softworks; The Legend of Zelda: Tears of the Kingdom – Nintendo; Marvel's Spider-Man 2 – Insomniac Games/Sony Interactive Entertainment; Star Wars Jedi: Survivor – Respawn Entertainment/Electronic Arts
British Game (presented by Craig Duncan): Viewfinder – Sad Owl Studios/Thunderful Group; Cassette Beasts – Bytten Studios/Raw Fury; Dead Island 2 – Dambuster Studios/Plaion; Disney Illusion Island – Dlala Studios/Disney; Football Manager 2024 – Sports Interactive/Sega Europe; Warhammer Age of Sigmar: Realms of Ruin – Frontier Developments	Debut Game (presented by Asa Butterfield): Venba – Visai Games; Cocoon – Geometric Interactive/Annapurna Interactive; Dave the Diver – Mintrocket; Dredge – Black Salt Games/Team17; Stray Gods: The Roleplaying Musical – Summerfall Games/Humble Games; Viewfinder – Sad Owl Studios/Thunderful Group
Evolving Game (presented by CyborgAngel and Sweet Anita): Cyberpunk 2077 – CD Projekt RED; Final Fantasy XIV – Square Enix; Fortnite – Epic Games; Forza Horizon 5 – Playground Games/Xbox Game Studios; Genshin Impact – HOYOVERSE; No Man's Sky – Hello Games	Family (presented by Inel Tomlinson and Braydon Bent): Super Mario Bros. Wonder – Nintendo; Cocoon – Geometric Interactive/Annapurna Interactive; Dave the Diver – Mintrocket; Disney Illusion Island – Dlala Studios/Disney; Hi-Fi Rush – Tango Gameworks/Bethesda Softworks; Hogwarts Legacy – Avalanche Software/Warner Bros. Games
Game Beyond Entertainment (presented by Samantha Béart): Tchia – Awaceb/Kepler Interactive; Chants of Sennaar – Rundisc/Focus Entertainment; Goodbye Volcano High – KO OP; Terra Nil – Free Lives/Devolver Digital; Thirsty Suitors – Outerloop Games/Annapurna Interactive; Venba – Visai Games	Game Design (presented by Jane Douglas): Dave the Diver – Mintrocket; Cocoon – Geometric Interactive/Annapurna Interactive; Dredge – Black Salt Games/Team17; The Legend of Zelda: Tears of the Kingdom – Nintendo; Marvel's Spider-Man 2 – Insomniac Games/Sony Interactive Entertainment; Viewfinder – Sad Owl Studios/Thunderful Group
Multiplayer (presented by Ben Starr): Super Mario Bros. Wonder – Nintendo; Baldur's Gate 3 – Larian Studios; Call of Duty: Modern Warfare III – Sledgehammer Games/Activision; Diablo IV – Blizzard Entertainment; Forza Motorsport – Turn 10 Studios/Xbox Game Studios; Party Animals – Recreate Games/Source Technology	Music (presented by Daniel Pemberton): Baldur's Gate 3 – Larian Studios; Alan Wake 2 – Remedy Entertainment/Epic Games; Assassin's Creed Mirage – Ubisoft; The Legend of Zelda: Tears of the Kingdom – Nintendo; Marvel's Spider-Man 2 – Insomniac Games/Sony Interactive Entertainment; Star Wars Jedi: Survivor – Respawn Entertainment/Electronic Arts
Narrative (presented by Tamoor Hussain): Baldur's Gate 3 – Larian Studios; Alan Wake 2 – Remedy Entertainment/Epic Games; Dredge – Black Salt Games/Team17; Final Fantasy XVI – Square Enix; The Legend of Zelda: Tears of the Kingdom – Nintendo; Star Wars Jedi: Survivor – Respawn Entertainment/Electronic Arts	New Intellectual Property (presented by Shelley Blond): Viewfinder – Sad Owl Studios/Thunderful Group; Chants of Sennaar – Rundisc/Focus Entertainment; Dave the Diver – Mintrocket; Dredge – Black Salt Games/Team17; Hi-Fi Rush – Tango Gameworks/Bethesda Softworks; Jusant – Don't Nod
Performer in a Leading Role (presented by David Harewood): Nadji Jeter as Miles Morales in Marvel's Spider-Man 2; Amelia Tyler as Narrator in Baldur's Gate 3; Cameron Monaghan as Cal Kestis in Star Wars Jedi: Survivor; Neil Newbon as Astarion in Baldur's Gate 3; Samantha Béart as Karlach in Baldur's Gate 3; Yuri Lowenthal as Peter Parker in Marvel's Spider-Man 2	Performer in a Supporting Role (presented by Eleanor Matsuura): Andrew Wincott as Raphael in Baldur's Gate 3; Debra Wilson as Cere Junda in Star Wars Jedi: Survivor; Ralph Ineson as Cidolfus Telamon in Final Fantasy XVI; Sam Lake as Alex Casey in Alan Wake 2; Tony Todd as Venom in Marvel's Spider-Man 2; Tracy Wiles as Jaheira in Baldur's Gate 3
Technical Achievement (presented by Ebonix): The Legend of Zelda: Tears of the Kingdom – Nintendo; Alan Wake 2 – Remedy Entertainment/Epic Games; Final Fantasy XVI – Square Enix; Horizon Call of the Mountain – Guerrilla Games, Firesprite/Sony Interactive Entertainment; Marvel's Spider-Man 2 – Insomniac Games/Sony Interactive Entertainment; Starfield – Bethesda Game Studios/Bethesda Softworks	EE Player's Choice Award (presented by Yami): Baldur's Gate 3 – Larian Studios; Cyberpunk 2077 – CD Projekt RED; Fortnite – Epic Games; The Legend of Zelda: Tears of the Kingdom – Nintendo; Lethal Company – Zeekerss; Marvel's Spider-Man 2 – Insomniac Games/Sony Interactive Entertainment

- Special Award (presented by Sir Ian Livingstone): SpecialEffect

== Games with multiple wins ==
Game	Wins
Baldur's Gate 3	5
Alan Wake 2	2
Super Mario Bros. Wonder	2
Viewfinder	2

== Games with multiple nominations ==
Game	Nominations
Baldur's Gate 3	11
Spider-Man 2	10
Alan Wake 2	8
The Legend of Zelda: Tears of the Kingdom	7
Star Wars Jedi: Survivor	6
Dave the Diver	5
Hi-Fi Rush	5
Cocoon	4
Dredge	4
Final Fantasy XVI	4
Super Mario Bros. Wonder	4
Viewfinder	4
Call of Duty: Modern Warfare III	2
Chants of Sennaar	2
Cyberpunk 2077	2
Diablo IV	2
Disney Illusion Island	2
Fortnite	2
Hogwarts Legacy	2
Venba	2
