= Lego 2K Drive =

Lego-based racing game

- Cover art featuring a Lego Speed Champions McLaren Solus GT
- Developer: Visual Concepts (Note: Additional work by Tantalus Media, Wicked Witch, Torus Games, and Mass Media)
- Publisher: 2K
- Director: Brian Silva
- Engine: Unreal Engine 4
- Platforms: Nintendo Switch; PlayStation 4; PlayStation 5; Windows; Xbox One; Xbox Series X/S
- Release: WW: May 19, 2023
- Genre: Racing
- Modes: Single-player, multiplayer

Lego 2K Drive is a Lego-based kart racing game developed by Visual Concepts and published by 2K. It was released on May 19, 2023, for Nintendo Switch, PlayStation 4, PlayStation 5, Windows, Xbox One, and Xbox Series X/S. The game is played in an open world that can be explored. The game received mixed reviews from critics, who praised the gamplay while criticizing the live-service nature of the title.

== Gamplay ==
Lego 2K Drive is a racing game played from a third-person perspective. The game is set in Bricklandia, an open world which consists of a number of regions which can be freely explored by players. The game features destructible environments, as is common in Lego games. In addition to completing the story, players can complete different mini-games and challenges in the game's world. In the game, players can create their vehicles with 1,000 unique LEGO pieces, though more conventional options, such as those from Lego City and Lego Creator, are also available. Vehicles can also transform, similar to Sonic & All-Stars Racing Transformed. For instance, a land-based vehicle can transform into a boat if it is driven into water. The game also includes both cooperative and competitive multiplayer modes, two-player split-screen, and six-player online play.

== Development ==
While TT Games developed most Lego games, Lego 2K Drive was developed by Visual Concepts South, which is mostly known for developing the NBA 2K series and the WWE 2K series. Members of the team had experience working on racing games such as Hydro Thunder and San Francisco Rush. The title is the first Lego racing game since the Lego Speed Champions DLC for Forza Horizon 4 in 2019. Lego 2K Drive marked the beginning of a multi-game deal between The Lego Group and 2K. Development of the game took about five years. According to the team, the game was intended to be a casual and approachable experience. Creative director Brian Silva added that 2K Drive was designed to be more than just a "racing game", as it encourages players to build their vehicles, explore the game's world and complete various side activities.

== Release ==
Announced in March 2023, the game was released on May 19, 2023, for Nintendo Switch, PlayStation 4, PlayStation 5, Windows, Xbox One, and Xbox Series X and S. Visual Concepts planned to support the game with additional downloadable content upon launch. The game is sold in three editions: a standard edition, an Awesome Edition and an Awesome Rivals Edition. The latter two editions include additional premium content and were released three days ahead of the game's street date. The Nintendo Switch version of the game does not support crossplay and wallet sharing.

The game was delisted on May 19, 2026. Online services will be shut down on May 31, 2027.

=== Downloadable content ===
Announced June 2023, 2K Games unveiled a downloadable content pack, Drive Pass Season 1 was released on June 28, 2023. It adds the 1970 Dodge Charger R/T and the Nissan Skyline GT-R as playable. It includes Bricklandia’s Fast Crew, sisters Rita and Lita Malachi, pilot Doug and resident techie Ronnie (aka CoNfL8t).

== Reception ==
Reception

Aggregate score
Aggregator	Score
Metacritic	(PS5) 73/100 (PS4) 60/100 (XSX) 72/100 (XONE) N/A (NS) 61/100 (PC) 74/100

Review scores
Publication	Score
Destructoid	6.5/10
Digital Trends	3/5
Game Informer	8/10
GameSpot	8/10
GamesRadar+	4/5
IGN	8/10
Push Square	7/10
The Guardian	3/5

Lego 2K Drive received "mixed or average reviews", according to the review aggregator website Metacritic. The game was nominated for Racing Game of the Year at the 27th Annual D.I.C.E. Awards, and was longlisted for Family and Multiplayer at the 20th British Academy Games Awards.

IGN enjoyed the in-game courses, writing, "The track design is also generally strong, with plenty of technical segments, environmental hazards, and rewarding shortcuts". GamesRadar+ felt the game's rubber-banding made early races feel artificial, "No matter how well you drive, the leader (and maybe another car or two) will always zoom off out of sight, reappearing with a lap to go". While criticizing the title's live service component, Rock Paper Shotgun praised the polished visuals, "Everything from the menu's thocks and snaps, to the sheen off a character's plastic casing suggests a level of care the Danes would be chuffed with".

Kotaku liked the way the game automatically switches vehicles on the fly, "Instead, as you race around, the game auto-swaps between either your car, boat, or off-road ride of choice. This streamlines what could have been an annoying part of 2K Drive, and also means that you can explore the entire Lego-filled world of Bricklandia as you please". Game Informer felt the writing effectively parodied other racing titles, saying that, "Lego 2K Drive's constant barrage of dialogue kept me giggling throughout".

Lego 2K Drive was the 7th best-selling boxed game in the United Kingdom in its week of release.
