= Dredge (video game) =

2023 video game

- Developer: Black Salt Games
- Publisher: Team17
- Producer: Nadia Thorne
- Programmer: Joel Mason
- Artist: Alex Ritchie
- Writer: Joel Mason
- Composer: David Mason
- Engine: Unity
- Platforms: Nintendo Switch; PlayStation 4; PlayStation 5; Windows; Xbox One; Xbox Series X/S; Android; iOS
- Release: Switch, PS4, PS5, Windows, Xbox One, Xbox Series X/S; March 30, 2023; Android, iOS; February 27, 2025
- Genre: Fishing
- Mode: Single-player

Dredge is a 2023 video game developed by Black Salt Games and published by Team17 that combines genres of fishing, survival, and horror. It follows a fisherman who faces Lovecraftian creatures as he fishes and explores an open world consisting of five archipelagos. As the game progresses, the player can upgrade the character's fishing equipment and abilities. It follows a day–night cycle; the day is serene, while the night contains the game's horror elements, such as supernatural events and sea monsters.

Black Salt Games conceived Dredge as a top-down turn-based game; that notion was scrapped during the prototype phase. Not wanting Dredge to be a jump scare horror game, they worked to create a psychological thriller atmosphere. Four of the five archipelagos are based on geological formations. After development was completed, they approached various publishers before settling on Team17. Dredge was released for Nintendo Switch, PlayStation 4, PlayStation 5, Windows, Xbox One, and Xbox Series X/S on March 30, 2023, with versions for Android and iOS following on February 27, 2025. Two downloadable content packs (DLCs), The Pale Reach and The Iron Rig, were released in 2023 and 2024, respectively.

Critics positively received Dredge, praising its gameplay, presentation, and exploration, while some complained that the fishing portions are repetitive. The game's story, horror elements, thriller undertones, and art style were also commended. Its DLCs were well received by critics. It was deemed one of the top video games of 2023 by several news outlets and was nominated for numerous awards.

== Gameplay ==
A screenshot showcasing the player's fishing boat. Players explore the world while avoiding sea monsters.

Dredge is a fishing and survival horror video game. The player controls a fisherman as he travels by boat through an ocean. He can help inhabitants of various islands, catch regular fish and mutated versions called aberrations, such as fish with multiple eyes, and dredge for materials such as wood and metal. The player fishes by participating in quick-time mini-games; clicking the mouse reels the fish quicker. Dredge features four archipelagos surrounding the central starting region, The Marrows. Each archipelago features different fish, quests, and enemies. When selling fish, players earn more money for aberrations and fresher catch. The money can be used to repair the boat, buy crab pots, and upgrade the motors. The game also features a progression system centered on upgrading the player's boat and equipment. Players can improve features such as the engine and lights, obtain better fishing lines and nets, and expand inventory space by collecting materials and "research parts" found while fishing or completing quests. This is all part of the game's skill tree. The fisherman's abilities can also be improved by reading books. In the inventory, items are represented by icons of varying shapes and sizes, that the player can arrange to permit more storage. In the base game, the player can catch up to 128 different species of fish, each tied to specific times of day and environments.

The game takes place on a day–night cycle, with time advancing whenever the player performs actions such as sailing or fishing. During the day, the ambience is relatively peaceful; at night, horror elements emerge when a fog appears across the sea. A mechanic during these nighttime sections is the panic meter, which reflects the player's sanity. Staying out too long after dark or neglecting sleep causes the meter to rise, increasing the likelihood of supernatural events. As panic grows, rocks can appear suddenly in the water, crows may steal the player's catch, and massive sea monsters may begin pursuing the boat. The higher the meter, the more frequently these dangers occur. Dredge features a game mode that prevents enemies from hunting the player.

== Plot ==
A Fisherman sails to the coastal town of Greater Marrow, situated in a distant archipelago, to take up a job as the town's angler. While the job starts typically, the fisherman begins to encounter strange phenomena, especially at night: a strange mist, rocks that suddenly appear from nowhere, ghost ships, hostile wildlife, sea monsters, and he has a feeling of being watched. As he sails around the archipelago, he finds messages in bottles, featuring diary entries written by a newlywed woman named Julie, who recounts her arrival in the archipelago with her husband. She witnessed him dredging up from the sea floor a mysterious casket which he opened, releasing the supernatural fog that plagues the archipelago. A gargantuan sea monster called the Leviathan then awoke and destroyed their boat, killing Julie and stranding the husband and the old mayor on a small island. The Fisherman finds himself stalked by the Leviathan, which is the archipelago's guardian and is set on preventing the Fisherman from leaving the area.

The Fisherman meets the Collector, a man living alone in an island mansion. The Collector tasks the Fisherman with exploring the other archipelago islands and the ancient ruins they hide to recover several relics. The Collector uses the Book of the Deep to grant the Fisherman supernatural powers. Once the Fisherman collects the relics, he can hand them over to the Collector.

- When the Fisherman hands over the relics, the Collector reveals that he is Julie's husband, who recovered the Book of the Deep from the casket and discovered a ritual that could resurrect Julie. He had the Fisherman gather the relics, all personal items of Julie's, because they are required for the ritual. The Fisherman takes the Collector to the part of the ocean where Julie had drowned and performs the ritual by throwing the collected relics overboard. The ritual successfully resurrects Julie but also awakens a massive Cthulhu-like eldritch beast, destroying Greater Marrow and presumably the rest of the world.
- If the Fisherman finds the old mayor in one of the five camps scattered across the map, a new ending is unlocked. This involves speaking with the lighthouse keeper and discovering that the Collector is a figment of the Fisherman's own imagination, an avatar of his own repressed memories and guilt over Julie's death. Rather than follow the Collector's bidding, the Fisherman heads out to sea and throws the Book of the Deep into the ocean, resulting in him, the book, and his boat being swallowed by the Leviathan. Afterwards, the supernatural fog plaguing the archipelago disappears. Alternatively, you can proceed with the first stated ending. The only difference will be that the pronouns will become second person.

=== The Pale Reach ===
The Fisherman heads south of the archipelago to discover the Pale Reach, a frozen biome that appears and disappears every few years. He helps a nature photographer capture a photo of a ravenous creature resembling a narwhal and assembles an icebreaker ram for his boat. The Fisherman then pursues the trail of an Antarctic expedition crew that disappeared nearly 100 years ago while investigating the Pale Reach. He finds journal entries that reveal that the Captain, Navigator, and Boatswain of the crew became enthralled by the ravaged and still-living remains of an enormous eldritch monster trapped in the ice. As the crew attempted to free the creature under the promise of treasure, the First Officer led a mutiny, which ended in most of the crew dying or fleeing the Pale Reach. Four men remained and became trapped in the ice, still bound to the creature and unable to die. After finding enchanted ice axes, the Fisherman frees the men from their torment, with their deaths killing the creature as well.

=== The Iron Rig ===
The Fisherman comes across an oil rig owned by the Ironhaven Company and meets two of its chief staff, the Foreman and the Scientist. The Foreman asks the Fisherman to recover lost supply shipments so they can complete the construction of the oil rig, while the Scientist requests that the Fisherman collect samples of the local wildlife for study. The Fisherman brings back enough supplies for the Foreman to finish construction of the oil rig, and they drill into the sea floor. This causes fissures to open up on the sea floor, releasing a dark ooze and species thought to be extinct. The Scientist has the Fisherman collect samples of the new species; eating them causes the Scientist to mutate into a monster, and he escapes to the ocean. The Executive arrives and orders the Foreman to continue drilling, even though it angers the local sea monsters. Fearful of the monsters, but equally fearful of the Executive, the Foreman asks the Fisherman to sabotage the oil rig's defense system to convince the Executive to abort the drilling. With the defense system down, a tentacled sea monster attacks the oil rig, destroying the drill before being eaten by the Leviathan. The Executive flees via helicopter, and the Foreman agrees to continue providing the Fisherman with advanced equipment until he and the rest of the oil rig crew can evacuate.

== Development ==
Dredge was developed by the New Zealand-based independent studio Black Salt Games and published by Team17. It was created using the Unity game engine. The studio initially experimented with three prototypes: a real-time strategy game, a stealth game, and Dredge. After playtesting them with friends and colleagues, Dredge was considered the most enjoyable and selected for further development. The original concept, written in two paragraphs, was inspired by games like Papers, Please (2013) and Moonlighter (2018), with the developers aiming to combine at least two core gameplay loops into a single experience. Early version of Dredge was conceived as a top-down turn-based game.

=== Design ===
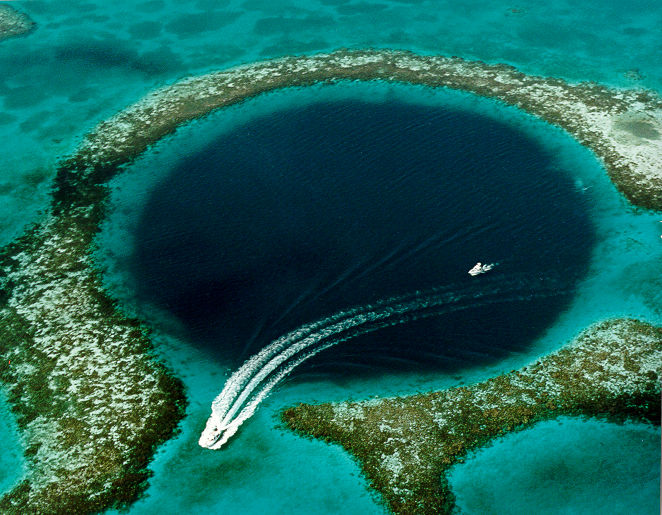
A blue hole served as an inspiration for one of the archipelagos.

The prototype initially included only the starting area, The Marrows. The first six months of development were spent refining that region, as well as controls and movement systems. Once the foundation was established, the team developed four additional biomes. Producer Nadia Thorne stated that each biome took roughly two to three months to complete. The open-world structure that allows players to travel freely between regions was partly inspired by The Legend of Zelda: Breath of the Wild (2017). Programmer and writer Joel Mason explained that while the archipelagos can be explored in any order, they were subtly designed to encourage a particular progression. Gale Cliffs draws on Scandinavian aesthetics, while Stellar Basin was inspired by blue holes (marine sinkholes), Twisted Strand by mangrove swamps, and Devil's Spine by Volcanoes. The team planned to add an ice biome, but postponed it until it was used in The Pale Reach downloadable content pack (DLC).

Although Black Salt Games wanted Dredge to have narrative depth, the small size of the team meant they had to be selective in scope. Early ideas included having characters represent different stages of grief, but as development progressed, the team shifted toward a broader mystery-driven story that better suited the game's structure. To support this approach, they adopted Yarn Spinner, an open-source dialogue tool that helped shape much of the game's narrative framework. The main story was further expanded through messages in bottles and quest descriptions. Rather than relying on voice acting, the developers chose to have characters communicate through stylized vocal sounds.

Michael Bastianes, the studio's 3D art director, said the team deliberately designed Dredge to feel unsettling without depending on jump scares. Rather than making a conventional horror game, Black Salt Games aimed for a "spooky" atmosphere rooted in psychological tension and Lovecraftian horror. (Note: Lovecraftian horror is a subgenre of horror which emphasizes the fear of the unknown instead of gore.) Bastianes explained that the studio wanted to leave much to the player's imagination. To support this, the team intentionally made daytime feel calm and inviting so that players would develop a false sense of security before being pressured into dangerous nighttime voyages. The daytime soundtrack reinforces this tranquil mood, helping establish the contrast that makes the game's horror elements more effective. At night, the music gives way to static-like noise. For these nighttime sections, the team also created a fog shader centered on the player rather than the camera. The developers designed sea monsters both for specific archipelagos and for the open ocean between them, gradually introducing these threats as players progressed.

=== Art style ===
Dredge uses a low-poly (a polygon mesh that has a low number of polygons) art style that has been part of the project since its earliest prototype. Art director Alex Ritchie chose subdued colors and simple shapes to create a stylized, cartoon-like world with minimal gradients. In shaping the game's visual identity, Ritchie drew particular inspiration from Disco Elysium (2019), especially its abstract, painterly approach to atmosphere. That influence helped inform Dredge's muted palette and subtly unsettling visual tone. The team also iterated on the game's water shaders throughout development to ensure that each archipelago felt visually distinct. This work included adjusting water hues and transparency depending on the region. Transparency was not present in the game's early stages, but was later added so players could see fish swimming beneath the surface.

=== Gameplay ===
Players improve their boat and equipment through an upgrade system that incorporates materials and that ties progression to exploration and resource gathering. In early versions of the game, upgrades were handled through a simple menu that displayed a list of purchasable improvements. The developers ultimately found this approach unengaging and evolved the game into its final version. While building the inventory system, the team also considered tying upgrades more directly to the player's loadout, for example letting players choose between faster or slower boats depending on which engines they carried. The material-based system was introduced later in the game.

Joel Mason played a central role in shaping Dredge's fishing systems, drawing both on his own knowledge of fish and on research from sources like Wikipedia to decide which species to include. Ritchie then designed the fish visually, including the human-like features seen in many aberrations. Early in development, the game featured only one fishing mini-game, but playtesters found it repetitive. In response, the developers introduced several different mini-game variations. Mason said the team wanted these mechanics to feel simple and accessible. He also noted that while engaging with mini-games is optional (clicking the mouse), the players will eventually catch the fish by waiting.

== Release ==
The team announced the game in August 2022 with a trailer, and showcased it at Gamescom later in the month. Black Salt Games looked for a publisher since the early development of the game, but were unsure if they could get one because Dredge was the studio's first game. They contacted about 40 publishers, and 20 responded. They settled with Team17, who had seen their content on Twitter. Dredge was released on March 30, 2023, for Windows, PlayStation 4, PlayStation 5, Xbox One, Xbox Series X/S, and Nintendo Switch platforms. The developers released several editions of the game: a standard edition of the base game, a digital edition that also features the Blackstone Key downloadable content (DLC), and a physical edition that included a poster, soundtrack, and in-game items. In October 2024, the developers announced that Dredge would be released on Android and iOS platforms. Initially scheduled to release in late 2024, the studio delayed the game to February 27, 2025, for iOS and Android Platforms. A collector's edition for PlayStation 5 and Nintendo Switch was released in November 2024.

The first DLC, Blackstone Key, was available from the release date. The DLC allows the player to unlock the Blackstone Isle Workshop, which enables the player to obtain a powerful boat engine. The second DLC, The Pale Reach, was released in November 2023 and introduced a polar biome, as well as new types of fish and pursuits. The third DLC, The Iron Rig, was supposed to come out in the fourth quarter of 2023, but was delayed to August 2024. The DLC introduced tasks related to an oil rig located in the ocean, and over 50 new types of fish.

In December 2023, Dredge collaborated with Dave the Diver (2023) to introduce crossover content into the latter game. In August 2025, Two Point Museum (2025) received crossover content from Dredge.

== Reception ==
Reception

Aggregate score
Aggregator	Score
Metacritic	(PC) 80/100 (Switch) 84/100 (XSXS) 85/100 (PS5) 81/100

Review scores
Publication	Score
Destructoid	6/10
Famitsu	9/10, 9/10, 8/10, 8/10
GameSpot	7/10
GamesRadar+	4.5/5
IGN	8/10
Nintendo Life	8/10
Nintendo World Report	8.5/10
NME	3/5
PC Gamer (US)	89/100
Pocket Gamer	4.5/5
Push Square	7/10
RPGFan	77/100
Shacknews	8/10
The Guardian	4/5
Bloody Disgusting	5/5

Dredge received a "generally favorable" reception from critics, according to the review aggregator website Metacritic. It sold over 100,000 copies within the first twenty-four hours of release, a milestone that the developers had expected would take a year or longer to reach. In October 2023, Black Salt Games reported that Dredge had sold one million copies.

Reviewers praised Dredge for its presentation. Harrison Abbot of Bloody Disgusting described the game experience as "well-balanced and thought-through", while Steven Green of Nintendo World Report called Dredge a "near-perfect indie game" due to being entertaining and innovative. Several reviewers also praised the game's balance of cozy and horror elements. The art style was praised by critics, with Gabriel Moss of IGN describing it as "mesmerizing" and "colorful", while Mollie Taylor of PC Gamer wrote that "horrific moments make it strangely even more gorgeous to look at". Green noted that the soundtrack "keeps things eerie throughout" and Moss praised the overall sound design, while Ricardo Fernández of MeriStation said that the soundtrack was somewhat sparse.

The fishing mechanics received mixed responses; those who praised it found it easy-to-understand, simple, snappy, and engaging, while others found it dull and repetitive. Most critics commended the Tetris (1988)-style inventory management system, though Stephen Tailby of Push Square stated it was "fiddly". The progression system garnered widespread approval. While Gamekult wrote that the milestones, part of the progression system, encourage the player to keep playing the game, Ali Jones of GamesRadar+ noted the imbalance of late-stage progression. Several reviewers complained about the speed of the day–night cycle, considering the days too short. The game's exploration aspect was praised, with Ozzie Mejia of Shacknews describing it as "rewarding" because players had to take risks especially during night time. Mejia complained that the map could have been incorporated as part of the heads-up display, while Famitsu said that they wished the map was easier to use. Green complained about long loading times on the Nintendo Switch and disliked that some quests were on a timer. Multiple reviewers noted that the game is not difficult to complete.

The game's story and dialogue have been commended by critics, with praise directed towards its mysteriousness and open-endedness. However, Evans-Thirlwell from Eurogamer found the story to be predictable. The Lovecraftian elements were praised by several reviewers, Stephen Gregson-Wood of Pocket Gamer wrote that the horror elements were "brilliantly executed", and Roland Ingram from Nintendo Life commended the mysterious monsters. Alessandro Barbosa of GameSpot complained that its Lovecraftian elements were mostly present in the final stages of the game. Taylor also found the Gale Cliffs archipelago frustrating, considering that the player is tasked with escaping from a "snaking monster" that is faster than the player, while Gregson-Wood disliked the fourth and fifth islands for not being as interesting as the first three.

=== Downloadable content ===
Reception

Aggregate score
Aggregator	Score
Metacritic	(PC) 83/100 (The Pale Reach) (PS5) 76/100 (The Pale Reach) (PC) 80/100 (The Iron Rig)

Review scores
Publication	Score
Destructoid	8.5/10 (The Iron Rig)
IGN	7/10 (The Iron Rig)
TouchArcade	3.5/5 (The Pale Reach)
VG247	4/5 (The Iron Rig)
PlayStation Universe	8/10 (The Pale Reach)

The Pale Reach for the PC and PlayStation 5 received a positive reception, according to the aggregator website Metacritic. Hirun Cryer of Rock Paper Shotgun praised the DLC's game design and the narwhal. He noted that questions about its story were left unanswered, which was a positive feature. Tommy Holloway of PlayStation Universe said he wished to see more detail in the design of the polar biome; he noted that the area is not as challenging as the main five areas of the game, and criticized the main quest for lacking depth. Shaun Musgrave of TouchArcade said that there was a lack of content in the DLC.

The Iron Rig for the PC received a positive reception, according to the aggregator website Metacritic. Castle saw the DLC as engaging. Compared to Still Wakes the Deep (2024), The Iron Rig is "a little toothless", according to Castle. Mark Warren of VG247 commended the new types of fish. Jamie Moorcroft-Sharp of Destructoid criticized the inconsistency in NPC reactions, while praising the integrated progression. Erwan Lafleuriel of IGN disliked the vagueness of the story and repetitiveness while praising the streamlined experience.

=== Accolades ===
Dredge was named among the best games of 2023 in lists compiled by Digital Spy, GamesRadar+, Time, The Guardian, Svenska Dagbladet, and Polygon. Shacknews featured it on its list of best indie games of 2023. Pocket Gamer and Rock Paper Shotgun featured Dredge on their most anticipated games lists.

Awards and nominations
Year	Ceremony	Category	Result	Ref(s).
2023	2023 Golden Joystick Awards	Best Indie Game	Nominated	
2023	The Game Awards 2023	Best Independent Game	Nominated	
2023	The Game Awards 2023	Best Debut Indie Game	Nominated	
2024	2023 The Steam Awards	Best Game on Steam Deck	Nominated	
2024	27th Annual D.I.C.E. Awards	Outstanding Achievement for an Independent Game	Nominated	
2024	24th Game Developers Choice Awards	Game of the Year	Nominated	
2024	24th Game Developers Choice Awards	Best Debut	Nominated	
2024	24th Game Developers Choice Awards	Best Design	Nominated	
2024	24th Game Developers Choice Awards	Innovation Award	Honorable mention	
2024	24th Game Developers Choice Awards	Best Narrative	Honorable mention	
2024	24th Game Developers Choice Awards	Best Visual Art	Honorable mention	
2024	24th Game Developers Choice Awards	Audience Award	Nominated	
2024	20th British Academy Games Awards	Best Game	Longlisted	
2024	20th British Academy Games Awards	Debut Game	Nominated	
2024	20th British Academy Games Awards	Game Design	Nominated	
2024	20th British Academy Games Awards	Narrative	Nominated	
2024	20th British Academy Games Awards	New Intellectual Property	Nominated	
2024	59th Nebula Awards	Best Game Writing	Nominated	
2024	2024 Hugo Awards	Best Game or Interactive Work	Nominated	
2025	Apple Design Awards	Interaction	Won	
2025	2025 Apple App Store Awards	iPad Game of the Year	Won	

== Film adaptation ==
In April 2024, Black Salt Games and production company Story Kitchen announced that they were working on a film adaptation of Dredge.
