= 27th Annual D.I.C.E. Awards =

2024 video-game awards event

- Date: February 15, 2024
- Venue: Aria Resort & Casino
- Hosted by: Stella Chung, Greg Miller

Highlights
- Most awards: Marvel's Spider-Man 2 (6)
- Most nominations: Marvel's Spider-Man 2 (9)
- Game of the Year: Baldur's Gate 3
- Hall of Fame: Koji Kondo

The 27th Annual D.I.C.E. Awards was the 27th edition of the D.I.C.E. Awards ("Design Innovate Communicate Entertain"), an annual awards event that honored the best games in the video game industry during 2023. The awards were arranged by the Academy of Interactive Arts & Sciences (AIAS), and was part of the 2024 D.I.C.E. Summit. The ceremony took place on February 15, 2024, at the Aria Resort & Casino in Las Vegas, Nevada. Greg Miller of Kinda Funny Games and Stella Chung returned as hosts for the ceremony. The nominees were announced on January 10, 2024.

Baldur's Gate 3, developed and published by Larian Studios, won the top award for "Game of the Year" along with four other awards. Marvel's Spider-Man 2 led the ceremony with the most nominations with nine, as well as the most wins with six. Sony Interactive Entertainment was the most nominated publisher of the ceremony, and is tied with Nintendo and Electronic Arts for publishing the most nominated games; Sony ended up being the most award-winning publisher, as well as publishing the most award-winning games. Insomniac Games and Nintendo EPD are the most nominated developers, with Insomniac winning the most awards as a developer. Nintendo EPD was the only developer with more than one award-winning game.

Koji Kondo, composer and sound designer from Nintendo who has worked on the Mario, The Legend of Zelda, and Star Fox games, was inducted into the Academy's Hall of Fame.

== Winners and nominees ==
Winners are listed first, highlighted in boldface, and indicated with a double dagger (‡).

=== Game of the Year awards ===
**Game of the Year**: **Baldur's Gate 3 (Larian Studios) — Swen Vincke, David Walgrave**‡; Alan Wake 2 (Remedy Entertainment, Epic Games) — Sam Lake, Kyle Rowley, Joonas Tamminen; Cocoon (Geometric Entertainment, Annapurna Interactive) — Jeppe Carlsen, Mads Engberg Hansen; Marvel's Spider-Man 2 (Insomniac Games, Sony Interactive Entertainment) — Bryan Intihar, Ryan Smith, Jeannette Lee; The Legend of Zelda: Tears of the Kingdom (Nintendo EPD) — Hidemaro Fujibayashi, Eiji Aonuma	**Online Game of the Year**: **Diablo IV (Blizzard Entertainment) — Joe Shely, Nick Rivera, Tiffany Wat**‡; Call of Duty: Modern Warfare III (Sledgehammer Games, Activision) — Greg Reisdorf, Zach Hodson, Adam Iscove, Matt Abbott, Mike Prestia, Robbie Elias, Ben Furneaux; Omega Strikers (Odyssey Interactive) — Dax Andrus, Thomas Bourus, David Cupurro, Alex Huang, Jesse Li, Chris Shankland; Street Fighter 6 (Capcom) — Yuta Kawamura, Takuya Ishibashi, Jumpei Nakajima, Mitsugu Ashida, Takayuki Nakayama, Ryuichi Shigerno; The Finals (Embark Studios) — Gustav Tilleby
**Mobile Game of the Year**: **What the Car? (Triband) — Tim Garbos, Lasse Astrup, Martin Donhal, Oscar Losada, Joachim Bruel Gerber**‡; Gubbins (Studio Folly) — Jessica Shupard, Darcy Smith; Hello Kitty Island Adventure (Sunblink) — Tom Blind, Chelsea Howe, Andy Vella; Honkai: Star Rail (HoYoverse) — David Jiang; Terra Nil (Free Lives, Devolver Digital) — Sam Alfred, Jonathan Hau-Yoon, Marcelle Marais	**Outstanding Achievement for an Independent Game**: **Cocoon (Geometric Entertainment, Annapurna Interactive) — Jeppe Carlsen, Mads Engberg Hansen**‡; Dredge (Black Salt Games, Team17) — Alex Ritchie, Joel Mason, Nadia Thorne; El Paso, Elsewhere (Strange Scaffold) — Xalavier Nelson Jr., Candace Hudert; Thirsty Suitors (Outerloop Games, Annapurna Interactive) — Sunny Dube, Chandana Ekanayake; Venba (Visai Games) — Abhi, Shahrin Khan

=== Immersive Reality awards ===
**Immersive Reality Game of the Year**: **Asgard's Wrath 2 (Sanzaru Games, Oculus Studios) — Bill Spence, Mat Kraemer, Evan Arnold**‡; Assassin's Creed Nexus VR (Red Storm Entertainment, Ubisoft) — David Votypka, Mark Russell, Olivier Palmieri, Philipp Sonnefeld; Horizon Call of the Mountain (Guerrilla Games, Firesprite, Sony Interactive Entertainment) — Jan-Bart van Beek, Alex Barnes, Stu Tilley; Vampire: The Masquerade – Justice (Fast Travel Games) — Erik Odeldahl, Andrea Wästlund; Vertigo 2 (Zulubo Productions) — Zach Tsiakalis-Brown	**Immersive Reality Technical Achievement**: **Horizon Call of the Mountain (Guerrilla Games, Firesprite, Sony Interactive Entertainment) — Tom Vernon, Pantelis Lekakis, Michiel van der Leeuw**‡; Asgard's Wrath 2 (Sanzaru Games, Oculus Studios) — Evan Arnold; Assassin's Creed Nexus VR (Red Storm Entertainment, Ubisoft) — Andrew Davies, Clark Cibson, Bobby Stewart, Robert Hexter, Jack Couvela, Peter Grinbergs, Vincent Maury, Rodrigo Cano, Steven Proctor, Sam Bigos, Jonas de Maeseneer, Martin Strohacker; Vertigo 2 (Zulubo Productions) — Zach Tsiakalis-Brown; We Are One (Flat Head Studio, Fast Travel Games) — Philipp Sigl, Melanie Barti, Daniel Wiendl, Fabian Linzbauer, Christian Höll, Arnold Holler

=== Craft awards ===
**Outstanding Achievement in Game Direction**: **Baldur's Gate 3 (Larian Studios) — Swen Vincke**‡; Cocoon (Geometric Entertainment, Annapurna Interactive) — Jeppe Carlsen; Marvel's Spider-Man 2 (Insomniac Games, Sony Interactive Entertainment) — Bryan Intihar, Ryan Smith; Super Mario Bros. Wonder (Nintendo EPD) — Shiro Mouri; The Legend of Zelda: Tears of the Kingdom (Nintendo EPD) — Hidemaro Fujibayashi	**Outstanding Achievement in Game Design**: **Baldur's Gate 3 (Larian Studios) — Nick Pechenin, Edouard Imbert, Farhang Namdar**‡; Cocoon (Geometric Entertainment, Annapurna Interactive) — Jeppe Carlsen, Asger Kirkemann Strandby, Martin Fasterholdt; Dave the Diver (Mintrocket) — Jaeho Hwang, Chanhee Woo; Super Mario Bros. Wonder (Nintendo EPD) — Koichi Hayashida, Masanobu Sato, Shiro Mouri; The Legend of Zelda: Tears of the Kingdom (Nintendo EPD) — Hidemaro Fujibayashi
**Outstanding Achievement in Animation**: **Marvel's Spider-Man 2 (Insomniac Games, Sony Interactive Entertainment) — Bobby Coddington, Danny Garnett**‡; Final Fantasy XVI (Square Enix) — Ryouhei Sakai, Takaharu Aono, Hirotaka Sawada; Hi-Fi Rush (Tango Gameworks, Bethesda Softworks) — Koichi Hatakeyama; Mortal Kombat 1 (NetherRealm Studios, Warner Bros. Games) — Tony Zeffiro, Fredy Palma; Super Mario Bros. Wonder (Nintendo EPD) — Tatsuya Sakai, Takahiro Nishigaki	**Outstanding Achievement in Art Direction**: **Alan Wake 2 (Remedy Entertainment, Epic Games) — Janne Pulkkinen, Anssi Määttä, Nazareno Urbano, Damien Stempniewski, John Crossland, Johannes Richter, Ron Frölich, Antti Puomio**‡; Hogwarts Legacy (Avalanche Software, Warner Bros. Games) — Jeff Bunker, Mike Thompson, Tyler Lybbert; Marvel's Spider-Man 2 (Insomniac Games, Sony Interactive Entertainment) — Jacinda Chew, D. Carvalho; Star Wars Jedi: Survivor (Respawn Entertainment, Electronic Arts) — Nate Stephens, Chris Sutton; Starfield (Bethesda Game Studios) — Istvan Pely
**Outstanding Achievement in Character**: **Miles Morales, Marvel's Spider-Man 2 (Insomniac Games, Sony Interactive Entertainment) — Portrayed by Nadji Jeter; senior narrative director Jon Paquette; narrative director Ben Arfmann; advanced senior writer Lauren Mee**‡; Saga Anderson, Alan Wake 2 (Remedy Entertainment, Epic Games) — Portrayed by Melanie Liburd; lead writer Sam Lake; lead narrative designer Simon Wasselin; lead mission designer Anne-Marie Grönroos; cinematics lead Mircea Purdea; cinematic animation lead Matias Leminen; lead narrative animator Kaj Lydecken; principal writer Clay Murphy; lead character artist John Crossland; performance director Hannah Price; principal narrative designer Molly Maloney; live action & cinematics director Anssi Määttä; Astarion, Baldur's Gate 3 (Larian Studios) — Portrayed by Neil Newbon; writing director Adam Smith; lead writer Chrystal Ding; senior writer Stephen Rooney; Karlach, Baldur's Gate 3 (Larian Studios) — Portrayed by Samantha Béart; writing director Adam Smith; lead writer Chrystal Ding; senior writer Sarah Baylus; Jala, Thirsty Suitors (Outerloop Games, Annapurna Interactive) — Portrayed by Farah Merani; written by Meghna Jayanth, Nadie Sharmmas, Sunny Dube, and Phillip Russell	**Outstanding Achievement in Original Music Composition**: **Marvel's Spider-Man 2 (Insomniac Games, Sony Interactive Entertainment) — John Paesano, Scott Hanau, Keith Leary, Rob Goodson**‡; Alan Wake 2 (Remedy Entertainment, Epic Games) — Petri Alanko, Richard Lapington; Diablo IV (Blizzard Entertainment) — Ted Reedy, Leo Kaliski, Derek Duke; Planet of Lana (Wishfully Studios, Thunderful Publishing) — Takeshi Furukawa; Star Wars Jedi: Survivor (Respawn Entertainment, Electronic Arts) — Stephen Barton, Gordy Haab, Nick Laviers, Steve Schnur, Alan Meyerson
**Outstanding Achievement in Audio Design**: **Marvel's Spider-Man 2 (Insomniac Games, Sony Interactive Entertainment) — Paul Mudra, Jerry Berlongieri, Dwight Okahara**‡; Alan Wake 2 (Remedy Entertainment, Epic Games) — Richard Lapington, Joshua Bell, Adam Butterworth, Kit Challis, Gulli Gunnarsoon, Thomas Holmes, Pauli Ondruska, Tazio Schiesari, Henry Scott, Ville Sorsa, Taneli Suoranta, Arthur Tisseront; Cocoon (Geometric Entertainment, Annapurna Interactive) — Jakob Schmid; Hi-Fi Rush (Tango Gameworks, Bethesda Softworks) — Shuichi Kobori, Makoto Yamaguchi; Star Wars Jedi: Survivor (Respawn Entertainment, Electronic Arts) — Nick von Kaenel, Collin Gregory Peck, Tom Jaine, Alex Barnhart, Oscar Coen, Nick Laviers, Harrison Deutsch, Ashton Faydenko, Kartika Dewi Luky, Tori Ano, Colin Andrew Grant, Andrew Karbowski	**Outstanding Achievement in Story**: **Baldur's Gate 3 (Larian Studios) — Adam Smith, Chrystal Ding**‡; Alan Wake 2 (Remedy Entertainment, Epic Games) — Sam Lake, Simon Wasselin, Anne-Marie Grönroos, Mircea Purdea, Matias Leminen, Kaj Lydecken, Clay Murphy, Tyler Burton Smith, Molly Maloney, Anssi Määttä; Dave the Diver (Mintrocket) — Jaeho Hwang; Thirsty Suitors (Outerloop Games, Annapurna Interactive) — Meghna Jayanth, Chandana Ekanayake, Nadie Sharmmas, Phillip Russell; Venba (Visai Games) — Abhi
**Outstanding Technical Achievement**: **Marvel's Spider-Man 2 (Insomniac Games, Sony Interactive Entertainment) — Doug Sheahan, Mike Fitzgerald, Jess Scott**‡; Alan Wake 2 (Remedy Entertainment, Epic Games) — Antti Kerminen, Anssi Hyytiäinen, Timo Sihvo, Riho Kroll, Tatu Aalto, Sami Hakkarainen; Hogwarts Legacy (Avalanche Software, Warner Bros. Games) — Rob Nelson, Jose Villeta, Jeff Gosztyla; The Finals (Embark Studios) — Mikael Linderholm, Adrian Björkerud, Andreas Glad, Joakim Stigsson, Ludvig Kingfors, Måns Isaksson, Johannes Hirche, Michael Ewert, Niklas Börestam, Emilie Granqvist, Marcus Svensson, Robert Kihl, Hedvig Axelsson, Gabór Szaloki, Malte Hildingsson, Olof Strömqvist; The Legend of Zelda: Tears of the Kingdom (Nintendo EPD) — Takuhiro Dohta

=== Genre awards ===
**Action Game of the Year**: **Marvel's Spider-Man 2 (Insomniac Games, Sony Interactive Entertainment) — Bryan Intihar, Ryan Smith, Jeannette Lee**‡; Armored Core VI: Fires of Rubicon (FromSoftware, Bandai Namco Entertainment) — Masaru Yamamura, Shohei Shimokobe, Yasunori Ogura; Dead Space (Motive Studios, Electronic Arts) — Roman Campos-Oriola, Eric Baptizat, Phillippe Ducharme; Hi-Fi Rush (Tango Gameworks, Bethesda Softworks) — John Johanas, Shinji Mikami; Remnant II (Gunfire Games, Gearbox Publishing) — Ben Gabbard, David Adams	**Adventure Game of the Year**: **The Legend of Zelda: Tears of the Kingdom (Nintendo EPD) — Hidemaro Fujibayashi, Eiji Aonuma**‡; Alan Wake 2 (Remedy Entertainment, Epic Games) — Sam Lake, Kyle Rowley, Joonas Tamminen; Cocoon (Geometric Entertainment, Annapurna Interactive) — Mads Engberg Hansen, Jeppe Carlsen; Dave the Diver (Mintrocket) — Jaeho Hwang, Chanhee Woo, Bosung Seo; Star Wars Jedi: Survivor (Respawn Entertainment, Electronic Arts) — Stig Asmussen, Jason de Heras, Jeff Magers
**Family Game of the Year**: **Super Mario Bros. Wonder (Nintendo EPD) — Shiro Mouri, Takashi Tezuka**‡; Disney Illusion Island (Dlala Studios, Disney Electronic Content) — Aj Grand-Scrutton, Grant Allen, Ben Waring; Fae Farm (Phoenix Labs) — Kate De Sousa, Isaac Epp, Ed Tam; Hello Kitty Island Adventure (Sunblink) — Tom Blind, Chelsea Howe, Andy Vella; Midnight Girl (Italic) — Thomas Ryder, Camilla Pedersen	**Fighting Game of the Year**: **Street Fighter 6 (Capcom) — Takayuki Nakayama, Shuhei Matsumoto, Kansuke Sakurai, Kaname Fujioka**‡; Granblue Fantasy Versus: Rising (Arc System Works, Cygames) — Tetsuya Fukuhara, Kazuya Tsuchiya; Mortal Kombat 1 (NetherRealm Studios, Warner Bros. Games) — Ed Boon, Graeme Bayless; Nickelodeon All-Star Brawl 2 (Fair Play Labs, GameMill Entertainment) — Diego Rodriguez, Sergio Chacón; Pocket Bravery (Statera Studio, Pqube) — Jonathan Silva, Anderson Halfeld
**Racing Game of the Year**: **Forza Motorsport (Turn 10 Studios, Xbox Game Studios) — Chris Esaki, Andy Beaudoin, Kyle Emtman, Srirekha Matety, Brian Yu**‡; F-Zero 99 (Nintendo Software Technology) — Chris Polney, Shinya Saito, Takao Nakano, Takeshi Hayakawa; Hot Wheels Unleashed 2: Turbocharged (Milestone) — Michele Caletti, Domenico Celenza; Lego 2K Drive (Visual Concepts, 2K) — Brian Silva, David Msika, Steve Ranck	**Role-Playing Game of the Year**: **Baldur's Gate 3 (Larian Studios) — Swen Vincke, David Walgrave**‡; Cyberpunk 2077: Phantom Liberty (CD Projekt Red) — Maciej Włodarkiewicz, Igor Sarzyński, Gabriel Amatangelo; Diablo IV (Blizzard Entertainment) — Rod Fergusson, Gavian Whishaw, Joe Shely; Final Fantasy XVI (Square Enix) — Naoki Yoshida, Hiroshi Takai; Starfield (Bethesda Game Studios) — Todd Howard, Angela Browder, Timothy Lamb
**Sports Game of the Year**: **MLB The Show 23 (SIE San Diego Studio, MLB Advanced Media) — Steve Merka, Jason Villa, Chris Cutliff, Chris Gill**‡; EA Sports FC 24 (EA Vancouver, EA Romania, EA Sports) — John Shepherd, Adam Shaikh, Karim Versi; WWE 2K23 (Visual Concepts, 2K) — Greg Thomas, Lynell Jinks, Colin O'Hara	**Strategy/Simulation Game of the Year**: **Dune: Spice Wars (Shiro Games, Funcom) — Sebastien Vidal**‡; Against the Storm (Eremite Games, Hooded Horse) — Michał Ogłoziński, Aron Pietroń; Cobalt Core (Rocket Rat Games, Brace Yourself Games) — John Guerra, Ben Driscoll; The Last Spell (Ishtar Games, The Arcade Crew) — Matthieu Richez, Benjamin Coquelle; Wartales (Shiro Games) — Nicolas Cannasse

=== Special awards ===
Hall of Fame

- Koji Kondo

=== Multiple nominations and awards ===
==== Multiple nominations ====
Games that received multiple nominations
Nominations	Game
9	Marvel's Spider-Man 2
8	Alan Wake 2
7	Baldur's Gate 3
6	Cocoon
5	The Legend of Zelda: Tears of the Kingdom
4	Star Wars Jedi: Survivor
4	Super Mario Bros. Wonder
3	Dave the Diver
3	Diablo IV
3	Hi-Fi Rush
3	Thirsty Suitors
2	Asgard's Wrath 2
2	Assassin's Creed Nexus VR
2	Final Fantasy XVI
2	The Finals
2	Hello Kitty Island Adventure
2	Hogwarts Legacy
2	Horizon Call of the Mountain
2	Mortal Kombat 1
2	Starfield
2	Street Fighter 6
2	Venba
2	Vertigo 2

Nominations by company
Nominations	Games	Company
12	3	Sony Interactive Entertainment
10	3	Nintendo
9	2	Annapurna Interactive
9	1	Insomniac Games
8	1	Epic Games
8	1	Remedy Entertainment
7	1	Larian Studios
6	3	Electronic Arts
6	1	Geometric Entertainment
5	2	Bethesda Softworks
4	2	Warner Bros. Games
4	1	Respawn Entertainment
3	1	Blizzard Entertainment
3	1	Mintrocket
3	1	Outerloop Games
3	1	Tango Gameworks
2	2	2K
2	2	Fast Travel Games
2	2	Shiro Games
2	1	Avalanche Software
2	1	Capcom
2	1	Embark Studios
2	1	Firesprite
2	1	Guerrilla Games
2	1	NetherRealm Studios
2	1	Oculus Studios
2	1	Red Storm Entertainment
2	1	Sanzaru Games
2	1	Square Enix
2	1	Sunblink
2	1	Ubisoft
2	1	Vesai Games
2	1	Zulubo Productions

==== Multiple awards ====
Games that received multiple awards
Awards	Game
6	Marvel's Spider-Man 2
5	Baldur's Gate 3

Awards by company
Awards	Games	Company
8	3	Sony Interactive Entertainment
6	1	Insomniac Games
5	1	Larian Studios
2	2	Nintendo
