= British Academy Games Award for Intellectual Property =

Video game award

British Academy Games Award for New Intellectual Property
- Awarded for: The best game from a new intellectual property
- Country: United Kingdom
- Presented by: British Academy of Film and Television Arts
- Currently held by: South of Midnight
- Website: www.bafta.org/games

The British Academy Video Games Award for New Intellectual Property is an award presented annually by the British Academy of Film and Television Arts (BAFTA). It is given in honor to "the best game which is not part of an established series and represents a new intellectual property".

The award was first presented at the 2nd British Academy Games Awards as Originality, after which the category was discontinued. It was revived in 2015 at the 11th edition, when it was presented as Original Property. The category received its current name at the 20th British Academy Games Awards.:

To date, no developer has won this award more that once. Nintendo EAD are the only developers with two nominations in the category and therefore have the most nominations without a win. Among publishers, Sony Interactive Entertainment has a leading eight nominations and two wins, tied with Annapurna Interactive for most wins. Devolver Digital has the most nominations without a win, with five.

The current holder of the award is South of Midnight by Compulsion Games and Xbox Game Studios, which won at the 22nd British Academy Games Awards in 2026.

== Winners and nominees ==
In the following table, the years are listed as per BAFTA convention, and generally correspond to the year of game release in the United Kingdom.

Table key
Indicates the winner

Originality

Year	Game	Developer(s)	Publisher(s)	Ref.
2003/04 (2nd)	SingStar / SingStar Party	London Studio	Sony Computer Entertainment	
2003/04 (2nd)	Animal Crossing	Nintendo EAD	Nintendo	
2003/04 (2nd)	Donkey Konga	Namco	Nintendo	
2003/04 (2nd)	Fable	Big Blue Box Studios and Lionhead Studios	Microsoft Game Studios	
2003/04 (2nd)	Second Sight	Free Radical Design	Codemasters	
2003/04 (2nd)	Sid Meier's Pirates!	Firaxis Games	Atari	

Original Property

Year	Game	Developer(s)	Publisher(s)	Ref.
2014 (11th)	Valiant Hearts: The Great War	Ubisoft Montpellier	Ubisoft	
2014 (11th)	Kalimba	Press Play	Microsoft Studios	
2014 (11th)	Sunset Overdrive	Insomniac Games	Microsoft Studios	
2014 (11th)	Monument Valley	ustwo Games		
2014 (11th)	Titanfall	Respawn Entertainment	Electronic Arts	
2014 (11th)	The Vanishing of Ethan Carter	The Astronauts		
2015 (12th)	Until Dawn	Supermassive Games	Sony Computer Entertainment	
2015 (12th)	Everybody's Gone to the Rapture	The Chinese Room and Santa Monica Studio	Sony Computer Entertainment	
2015 (12th)	Her Story	Sam Barlow		
2015 (12th)	Life Is Strange	Dontnod Entertainment	Square Enix	
2015 (12th)	Ori and the Blind Forest	Moon Studios	Microsoft Studios	
2015 (12th)	Splatoon	Nintendo EAD	Nintendo	
2016 (13th)	Inside	Playdead		
2016 (13th)	Firewatch	Campo Santo	Panic	
2016 (13th)	The Last Guardian	Japan Studio	Sony Interactive Entertainment	
2016 (13th)	Overwatch	Blizzard Entertainment		
2016 (13th)	Unravel	Coldwood Interactive	Electronic Arts	
2016 (13th)	The Witness	Thekla, Inc.		
2017 (14th)	Horizon Zero Dawn	Guerrilla Games	Sony Interactive Entertainment Europe	
2017 (14th)	Cuphead	Studio MDHR		
2017 (14th)	Gorogoa	Jason Roberts	Annapurna Interactive	
2017 (14th)	What Remains of Edith Finch	Giant Sparrow	Annapurna Interactive	
2017 (14th)	Night in the Woods	InfiniteFall	Finji	
2017 (14th)	PlayerUnknown's Battlegrounds	PUBG Corp	Bluehole, Inc.	
2018 (15th)	Into the Breach	Subset Games		
2018 (15th)	Dead Cells	Motion Twin		
2018 (15th)	Florence	Mountains	Annapurna Interactive	
2018 (15th)	Moss	Polyarc		
2018 (15th)	Return of the Obra Dinn	Lucas Pope	3909	
2018 (15th)	Subnautica	Unknown Worlds Entertainment		
2019 (16th)	Outer Wilds	Mobius Digital	Annapurna Interactive	
2019 (16th)	Baba Is You	Hempuli		
2019 (16th)	Control	Remedy Entertainment	505 Games	
2019 (16th)	Death Stranding	Kojima Productions	Sony Interactive Entertainment	
2019 (16th)	Disco Elysium	ZA/UM		
2019 (16th)	Untitled Goose Game	House House	Panic	
2020 (17th)	Kentucky Route Zero: TV Edition	Cardboard Computer	Annapurna Interactive	
2020 (17th)	Carrion	Phobia Game Studio	Devolver Digital	
2020 (17th)	Fall Guys	Mediatonic	Devolver Digital	
2020 (17th)	Ghost of Tsushima	Sucker Punch Productions	Sony Interactive Entertainment	
2020 (17th)	Hades	Supergiant Games		
2020 (17th)	Spiritfarer	Thunder Lotus	Kowloon Nights	
2021 (18th)	It Takes Two	Hazelight Studios	Electronic Arts	
2021 (18th)	Deathloop	Arkane Studios	Bethesda Softworks	
2021 (18th)	Death's Door	Acid Nerve	Devolver Digital	
2021 (18th)	Inscryption	Daniel Mullins Games	Devolver Digital	
2021 (18th)	Returnal	Housemarque	Sony Interactive Entertainment	
2021 (18th)	Unpacking	Witch Beam	Humble Bundle	
2022 (19th)	Elden Ring	FromSoftware	Bandai Namco	
2022 (19th)	Cult of the Lamb	Massive Monster	Devolver Digital	
2022 (19th)	Citizen Sleeper	Jump Over the Age	Fellow Traveller	
2022 (19th)	Sifu	Sloclap		
2022 (19th)	Stray	BlueTwelve	Annapurna Interactive	
2022 (19th)	Vampire Survivors	Poncle		

New Intellectual Property

Year	Game	Developer(s)	Publisher(s)	Ref.
2023 (20th)	Viewfinder	Sad Owl Studios	Thunderful Group	
2023 (20th)	Chants of Sennaar	Rundisc	Focus Entertainment	
2023 (20th)	Dave the Diver	Mintrocket		
2023 (20th)	Dredge	Black Salt Games	Team17	
2023 (20th)	Hi-Fi Rush	Tango Gameworks	Bethesda Softworks	
2023 (20th)	Jusant	Don't Nod		
2024 (21st)	Still Wakes the Deep	The Chinese Room	Secret Mode	
2024 (21st)	Animal Well	Shared Memory	Bigmode	
2024 (21st)	Balatro	LocalThunk	Playstack	
2024 (21st)	Black Myth: Wukong	Game Science		
2024 (21st)	Metaphor: ReFantazio	Studio Zero	Sega, JP: Atlus	
2024 (21st)	Thank Goodness You're Here!	Coal Supper	Panic Inc.	
2025 (22nd)	South of Midnight	Compulsion Games	Xbox Game Studios	
2025 (22nd)	ARC Raiders	Embark Studios		
2025 (22nd)	Clair Obscur: Expedition 33	Sandfall Interactive	Kepler Interactive	
2025 (22nd)	Dispatch	AdHoc Studio		
2025 (22nd)	Split Fiction	Hazelight Studios	Electronic Arts	
2025 (22nd)	The Alters	11 Bit Studios		

== Multiple nominations and wins ==
=== Developers ===
Developer	Nominations	Wins
Nintendo EAD	2	0

=== Publishers ===
Developer	Nominations	Wins
Sony Computer/Interactive Entertainment	8	2
Annapurna Interactive	6	2
Devolver Digital	5	0
Microsoft/Xbox Game Studios	4	0
Electronic Arts	3	1
Nintendo	3	0
Panic	2	0
