= Cocoon (video game) =

2023 video game

- Developer: Geometric Interactive
- Publisher: Annapurna Interactive
- Director: Jeppe Carlsen
- Producer: Mads Engberg Hansen
- Designer: Jeppe Carlsen
- Artist: Erwin Kho
- Composer: Jakob Schmid
- Engine: Unity
- Platforms: Nintendo Switch; PlayStation 4; PlayStation 5; Windows; Xbox One; Xbox Series X/S
- Release: September 29, 2023
- Genres: Adventure; puzzle
- Mode: Single-player

Cocoon is a 2023 puzzle adventure game developed by Geometric Interactive and published by Annapurna Interactive. The player controls a beetle that can hop between worlds, solving puzzles to unravel the universe's mysteries. The game was released on September 29, 2023 for Nintendo Switch, PlayStation 4, PlayStation 5, Windows, Xbox One and Xbox Series X/S.

Cocoon received generally positive reviews from critics.

== Gameplay ==
The player can pull specific objects found throughout the world.

Cocoon is a third-person puzzle video game. The player controls a small insectoid creature navigating multiple desolate worlds.

The player wakes up in a barren wasteland, soon after discovering a mysterious orb. Each orb contains one of the game's worlds, allowing the player to hop between them, while also doubling as a unique ability in itself. The orb can also be used to power the various machinery found in these desolate worlds, such as lifts and platforms. As the player reaches the end of each orb, they are confronted by a boss fight they must complete by using a mechanic to impede the creature.

== Development ==
Cocoon was directed by Jeppe Carlsen, who previously designed Limbo and Inside. According to Carlsen, the game started development shortly after he left Playdead in 2016, and was centered around how "spatial relationships between interconnected realms could be used in puzzles". Composer Jakob Schmid and art director Erwin Kho joined Carlsen to form Geometric Interactive.

The game was initially conceived as a sidescroller, but they found that it lessened the impact of traveling between worlds and switched the perspective to top-down. Cocoon's sound design is entirely made up of synthetic noises rather than recordings. Certain orb designs did not make the final cut: a rhythm orb that worked in tandem with the game's music, for instance, proved too distracting to players.

== Reception ==
Reception

Aggregate scores
Aggregator	Score
Metacritic	(PC) 88/100 (PS5) 90/100 (XSXS) 89/100 (NS) 89/100
OpenCritic	87/100; 98% Critics Recommend

Review scores
Publication	Score
Digital Trends	4/5 stars
Easy Allies	9/10
Eurogamer	5/5 stars
Game Informer	8.75/10
GamesRadar+	5/5 stars
Hardcore Gamer	3.5/5
IGN	9/10
PC Gamer (US)	90/100
Polygon	Recommended
Push Square	9/10 stars
Shacknews	8/10

Cocoon received "generally favorable" reviews, according to review aggregator Metacritic. 98% of critics recommend the game on OpenCritic.

Hana Kim of IGN praised the design of the puzzles, writing, "seeing how each piece of the puzzle interacts with others and figuring out the layers between them is some of the most mesmerizing and engaging stuff I've seen in a while". Eurogamer's Christian Donlan enjoyed the art direction of Cocoon, feeling that it captured the alien nature of the setting, "you're exploring worlds that are both gloopy and organic, filled with heavily vesseled tumours and sacs and twitching mandibles".

Rachel Watts of GamesRadar+ liked how the game placed the player into a "flowstate" with its puzzles, "Sure, you may need to get those neurons firing for one or two puzzles, but solving the majority is a more meditative experience".

In Game Informer's review of the game, Kyle Hilliard felt that some of the puzzles could be a bit drawn out, saying, "there are a few instances where I felt I was going through a motion to finish a puzzle as opposed to arriving at a moment of brilliant catharsis". Writing for Polygon, Grayson Morley said that he loved the soundtrack, feeling it complemented the atmosphere perfectly, "A gorgeous synth soundtrack accompanies your journey, occasionally threaded with a dampened piano glissando that never fails to inspire dread".

Ed Thorn’s Rock Paper Shotgun review praised the game for not being overly obtuse, writing that "solutions are often intuitive twists on a blueprint", rather than "brain-busting world swappery".

=== Awards ===
The game was selected by Eurogamer as their Game of the Year.

Awards and nominations
Year	Ceremony	Category	Result	Ref.
2023	Golden Joystick Awards	Ultimate Game of the Year	Nominated	
2023	Golden Joystick Awards	Best Indie Game	Nominated	
2023	Golden Joystick Awards	Breakthrough Award	Won	
2023	The Game Awards 2023	Best Independent Game	Nominated	
2023	The Game Awards 2023	Best Debut Indie Game	Won	
2024	27th Annual D.I.C.E. Awards	Game of the Year	Nominated	
2024	27th Annual D.I.C.E. Awards	Adventure Game of the Year	Nominated	
2024	27th Annual D.I.C.E. Awards	Outstanding Achievement for an Independent Game	Won	
2024	27th Annual D.I.C.E. Awards	Outstanding Achievement in Game Direction	Nominated	
2024	27th Annual D.I.C.E. Awards	Outstanding Achievement in Game Design	Nominated	
2024	27th Annual D.I.C.E. Awards	Outstanding Achievement in Audio Design	Nominated	
2024	24th Game Developers Choice Awards	Game of the Year	Nominated	
2024	24th Game Developers Choice Awards	Best Audio	Honorable mention	
2024	24th Game Developers Choice Awards	Best Debut	Nominated	
2024	24th Game Developers Choice Awards	Best Design	Nominated	
2024	24th Game Developers Choice Awards	Innovation Award	Nominated	
2024	24th Game Developers Choice Awards	Best Technology	Honorable mention	
2024	24th Game Developers Choice Awards	Best Visual Art	Nominated	
2024	24th Game Developers Choice Awards	Audience Award	Nominated	
2024	Independent Games Festival	Seumas McNally Grand Prize	Nominated	
2024	Independent Games Festival	Excellence in Audio	Nominated	
2024	Independent Games Festival	Excellence in Design	Nominated	
2024	Game Audio Network Guild Awards	Creative and Technical Achievement in Music	Nominated	
2024	Game Audio Network Guild Awards	Sound Design of the Year	Nominated	
2024	20th British Academy Games Awards	Best Game	Longlisted	
2024	20th British Academy Games Awards	Debut Game	Nominated	
2024	20th British Academy Games Awards	Artistic Achievement	Nominated	
2024	20th British Academy Games Awards	Family	Nominated	
2024	20th British Academy Games Awards	Game Design	Nominated	
2024	20th British Academy Games Awards	New Intellectual Property	Longlisted	
