= SpecialEffect =

British video gaming charity

- Formation: 2007
- Founder: Mick Donegan
- Type: NGO
- Legal status: Charity
- Headquarters: The Stable Block, Cornbury Park, Charlbury, Oxfordshire OX7 3EH, United Kingdom
- Website: https://www.specialeffect.org.uk/

SpecialEffect is a charity based in the United Kingdom founded in 2007. It specialises in helping physically disabled people, specifically children, play video games. The organisation works with developers to create specialised game control devices as well as making their games more accessible. This includes controllers using inputs from any part of the body that can move, such as small toe movements or the player's gaze. The ability to play video games, now seen as an almost universal pastime, can help improve the mental health of disabled people who otherwise could not play them.

== History ==
SpecialEffect was founded by Mick Donegan, a former teacher, who remains its CEO. It was created to focus on the people with the most complex physical disabilities, allowing them to play games effectively and with the greatest chance of winning. The organisation uses a team of specialists including occupational therapists and a technical and software design team.

The charity uses Eye Gaze, a technology that utilises eye motion for control input. They have worked with publishers to produce specialist equipment such as adaptive controllers.

In 2024, SpecialEffect were announced as the recipient for the BAFTA Special Award for their work promoting accessibility in gaming. The award was presented at the 20th British Academy Games Awards.

== Charity ==
SpecialEffect has organised charity events to fund its ventures such as GameBlast and One Special Day. Well-established companies as well as trending game designers have aided in creating charity events such as the 2020 video game developers of Fall Guys, who set up an event to award the highest donator during a specified time.
