= Dave the Diver =

2023 video game

- Developer: Mintrocket
- Publishers: Mintrocket; Arc System Works (Anniversary Edition)
- Director: Jaeho Hwang
- Producer: Daehwon Kim
- Designer: Chanhee Woo
- Programmer: Bosung Seo
- Artist: Kiyeop Chung
- Composers: D'Anthoni Wooten; Jukio Kallio
- Engine: Unity
- Platforms: macOS; Windows; Nintendo Switch; PlayStation 4; PlayStation 5; Nintendo Switch 2; Xbox One; Xbox Series X/S; iOS; Android
- Release: macOS, Windows; June 28, 2023; Nintendo Switch; October 26, 2023; PlayStation 4, PlayStation 5; April 16, 2024; Nintendo Switch 2; November 6, 2025; Xbox One, Xbox Series X/S; November 20, 2025; iOS, Android; September 17, 2026
- Genre: Adventure
- Mode: Single-player

Dave the Diver is a 2023 video game developed and published by Mintrocket. The game combines both action-adventure and management gameplay styles as players explore deep sea environments to gather ingredients for a sushi restaurant. It was released for macOS and Windows in June 2023 following an early access release in October 2022.

A Nintendo Switch version was released in October 2023. Versions for PlayStation 4 and PlayStation 5 were released in April 2024,, for Nintendo Switch 2, Xbox One and Xbox Series X/S in November 2025 and for iOS and Android in September 2026.

== Plot ==
Dave, a diver, is approached by his friend Cobra, who starts up a sushi restaurant venture with the skilled chef Bancho. Setting up location at the Blue Hole, a spot said to contain fish from all over the world, Dave is tasked with fishing for ingredients during the day, and helping Bancho with the restaurant at night. During his escapades, Dave comes across a race of sea people which leads him to the mystery behind the random earthquakes that have been occurring.

== Gameplay ==
Later in the game, players can unlock the ability to dive at night.

Dave the Diver, in which players control the eponymous Dave, is a game with a pixel art aesthetic that is divided into two main gameplay styles; diving into the sea during the day and running a sushi restaurant in the evening. Twice per in-game day, with the option to dive again during the evening unlocked later on in the game, players dive into the Blue Hole in search of fish, sealife and various other materials.

Dave is equipped with a harpoon gun for attacking and reeling in fish, and can use various guns, melee weapons, harpoon attachments and items that can be found during each diving session. Dave has a limited supply of oxygen which further decreases if he is attacked by aggressive sealife and other obstacles. If he runs out of oxygen before he can return to the surface, the diving session will end prematurely and only one resource that was found can be taken back. Players can use gold earned throughout the game to improve Dave's equipment in various ways, such as increasing his weight and oxygen capacity or allowing him to dive deeper. Players can also unlock additional means for catching sealife as the game progresses, such as fishing nets and drones.

At the end of each in-game day, Dave helps sushi chef Bancho run the restaurant, using fish gathered from diving sessions to craft sushi and other menu items. Players must then serve these dishes to customers while serving drinks, cleaning tables and topping up wasabi. Performing well will earn players gold and increase the restaurant's representation, unlocking new recipes, upgrades and cosmetics. Occasionally, special customers and VIP guests will appear, requiring the player to gather specific ingredients to create their desired dish.

Clearing these requests unlocks additional features, such as staff to assist in the restaurant and a farm to grow rice and vegetables. The game features multiple side characters who offer side-quests and upgrades, events that appear during the in-game calendar, and various unlockable minigames. To advance further, players will face multiple bosses, each with special powers, weaknesses, and ingredient drops. Players will need to solve puzzles to unlock new areas that contain different fish, which are valued at a higher price.

End game areas such as the Glacial Passage, Glacier Zone and Hydrothermal Vents feature the most valuable fish but also the most dangerous enemies.

== Development ==
The development of Dave the Diver started in 2017 as a prototype named Dave, where a diver obtains various fish as rewards. This version was considered too simplistic and mundane, and the developer decided to restart the project with a version built around resource management.

Dave the Diver was initially announced as a mobile game in 2018 by Nexon Mobile subsidiaries NeoPle and Studio 42 in collaboration with National Geographic to "bring awareness to all the beauty the ocean has and how it's slowly fading away," before being reannounced in May 2022 as the first game by Nexon subsidiary Mintrocket. The game's director Jaeho Hwang based the initial concept on a real-life restaurant on Jeju Island, whose owner dives for ingredients during the day and serves them during the evening. The development team's own diving experiences served as inspiration, along with games such as Torneko's Great Adventure, Abzu and Metal Gear Solid.

Mintrocket found it challenging to balance the game's various mechanics so no particular gameplay element becomes repetitive, which they resolved through trial and error during early access. The game entered early access in October 2022 and was officially released for macOS and Windows on June 28, 2023. An update in August improved accessibility support, allowing people to bypass quick-time events, among other quality-of-life improvements. A port for Nintendo Switch was released on October 26, 2023, ports for PlayStation 4 and PlayStation 5 were released on April 16, 2024, and for Xbox One and Xbox Series X/S on November 20, 2025. A Nintendo Switch 2 Edition of the game was released on November 6, 2025, with a free upgrade pack for existing Switch owners. A port for mobile phones is scheduled to release on September 17, 2026.

Free downloadable content based on Black Salt Games' Dredge video game was released on December 15, 2023. The DLC adds a fog weather event in which the player can dredge for valuable items and catch unique types of fish. A second batch of free, limited-time DLC featuring crossover content from the Godzilla franchise was released on May 23, 2024. The DLC adds missions that, when completed, can unlock new recipes and decorations. The DLC was delisted on November 23, but returned to digital stores on June 27, 2025. A free update featuring collaboration content with the Balatro and Potion Craft video games and singer-songwriter Mxmtoon was released on October 24, 2024. A batch of paid, limited-time DLC featuring crossover content from the Like a Dragon franchise was released on April 10, 2025. An expansion DLC titled Dave the Diver: In the Jungle was released on June 18, 2026. This DLC adds a new storyline in a village with new characters, an underwater lake with new fish, and additional weapons, minigames and collaborations with more games. A final batch of free DLC featuring crossover content from Subnautica 2 was announced to release in early 2027.

A physical "Anniversary Edition" featuring crossover content from Guilty Gear Strive (which was later released as free DLC in September 2026) was published by Arc System Works for Nintendo Switch on June 28, 2024. A second physical edition, published by Silver Lining Interactive and including all previously released DLC, released on September 30th, 2026 for PlayStation 5 and Nintendo Switch 2.

== Reception ==
Reception

Aggregate score
Aggregator	Score
Metacritic	PC: 90/100; NS: 88/100; PS5: 91/100

Review scores
Publication	Score
Destructoid	9/10
Eurogamer	5/5
Famitsu	36/40
Game Informer	8.75/10
IGN	9/10
PC Gamer (US)	91/100
Shacknews	9/10

Dave the Diver received "universal acclaim" based on 44 critic reviews according to review aggregator website Metacritic. In Japan, four critics from Famitsu gave the game a total score of 36 out of 40, with one critic awarding the game a perfect 10.

Praising the game's complexity, yet calling it "utterly relaxing", PC Gamer's reviewer said it already made his shortlist for game of the year as of June 2023. Destructoid called the gameplay "engaging", and said the story was "silly, yet endearing". IGN labeled it as an editors' choice and said it is "wholesome, wonderfully complex, and delightfully hard to put down". Eurogamer said it was "wholesome, harmonious, and completely unwilling to settle", calling it one of the most generous games in years.

Game Informer praised it for being able to handle being both an exploration experience and management sim and said it was a "unique and memorable vacation away from expectations". Polygon said its myriad minigames come together unexpectedly well, anchored by well-made cutscenes. Cutscenes were further praised by players for their style and humour. VideoGamer.com said "there's always something to do" without it ever seeming like busy work, which they called "refreshingly different" from the games as a service model. GamesRadar+ called it "a smash-hit success story". Several major publications included it on their 'best games of 2023' rundowns, including ReadWrite, Game Rant, The Guardian and The Verge.

=== Sales ===
Two days after its release, Dave the Diver was the fifth best-selling product on Steam. It had sold over one million copies within ten days of release, and three million copies by January 2024. As a result of the title's success, Nexon made Mintrocket a wholly owned subsidiary in September 2024 to continue developing innovative games. In November 2024, Mintrocket announced that Dave the Diver has surpassed 5 million copies sold across all platforms.

=== Awards ===
Although Dave the Diver's developer Mintrocket is wholly owned by Nexon, several commentators and publications have referred to the game as an "indie game", and the game was nominated for the "Best Independent Game" categories at The Game Awards 2023 and Golden Joystick Awards 2023. Although it did not win either award, the game's nominations in these categories raised criticism over how its inclusion potentially prevented other indie games from being nominated, sparking a debate on how indie games should be defined.

Responding to the game's nomination, Geoff Keighley, organizer of The Game Awards, stated "independent can mean different things to different people and it's sort of a broad term, right?" The game's director, Jaeho Hwang, said that he does not consider the game to be indie.

Year	Ceremony	Category	Result	Ref.
2023	41st Golden Joystick Awards	Best Indie Game	Nominated	
2023	41st Golden Joystick Awards	PC Game of the Year	Nominated	
2023	41st Golden Joystick Awards	Best Game Trailer (Accolades Trailer)	Nominated	
2023	The Game Awards 2023	Best Independent Game	Nominated	
2023	The Steam Awards	Sit Back and Relax	Won	
2024	27th Annual D.I.C.E. Awards	Adventure Game of the Year	Nominated	
2024	27th Annual D.I.C.E. Awards	Outstanding Achievement in Game Design	Nominated	
2024	27th Annual D.I.C.E. Awards	Outstanding Achievement in Story	Nominated	
2024	24th Game Developers Choice Awards	Game of the Year	Nominated	
2024	24th Game Developers Choice Awards	Best Debut	Nominated	
2024	24th Game Developers Choice Awards	Best Design	Honorable mention	
2024	24th Game Developers Choice Awards	Innovation Award	Honorable mention	
2024	24th Game Developers Choice Awards	Audience Award	Nominated	
2024	20th British Academy Games Awards	Best Game	Nominated	
2024	20th British Academy Games Awards	Debut Game	Nominated	
2024	20th British Academy Games Awards	Family	Nominated	
2024	20th British Academy Games Awards	Game Design	Won	
2024	20th British Academy Games Awards	New Intellectual Property	Nominated	
2024	20th British Academy Games Awards	Narrative	Longlisted	
2026	44th Golden Joystick Awards	Best Game Expansion (In the Jungle Content Pack)	Nominated	

== Manga adaptation ==
A manga adaptation illustrated by Shinnosuke Tsuchida began serialization in the September 2023 issue of Shogakukan's children's manga magazine Monthly CoroCoro Comic on August 12, 2023.

== Spin-off ==
A prequel titled Bancho the Chef was revealed on June 2, 2026 and is set to release on PC and PlayStation 5.
