= Lovers in a Dangerous Spacetime =

2015 video game

- Developer: Asteroid Base
- Publisher: Asteroid Base
- Producer: Jamie Tucker
- Designers: Matt Hammill; Jamie Tucker; Adam Winkels
- Programmers: Adam Winkels; Jamie Tucker
- Artist: Matt Hammill
- Composer: Ryan Henwood
- Engine: Unity
- Platforms: Linux, Microsoft Windows, OS X, PlayStation 4, Nintendo Switch, Xbox One
- Release: Microsoft Windows, Linux, OS X, Xbox One; September 9, 2015; PlayStation 4; February 9, 2016; Nintendo Switch; October 3, 2017
- Genres: Action, platform
- Modes: Single-player, multiplayer

Lovers in a Dangerous Spacetime is a space shooter video game developed by Asteroid Base for Microsoft Windows, OS X, PlayStation 4, Linux, Xbox One, and Nintendo Switch. The project is part of the ID@Xbox program. The game's title is a reference to the Bruce Cockburn song "Lovers in a Dangerous Time".

== Gameplay ==
The game can be played alone or with two to four players. The players pilot a spaceship with a variety of stations located inside it. These stations control the ship's weapons, engine, shield, Yamato cannon, and map. Each player controls only a single avatar (as well as commanding the AI pet in single-player mode), and thus must constantly move from station to station in order to balance flying the ship, protecting it from damage, and attacking enemies. During the course of gameplay, gift boxes can be discovered which may contain gems. These gems can be attached to the stations, giving them new, enhanced powers.

The game consists of four campaigns; each contains four levels and a boss fight. The goal of the regular levels is to find and rescue an assortment of captured creatures including bunnies, frogs, foxes, and ducks. After capturing five such creatures in a level, a heart-shaped portal to the next level is unlocked and the players may enter it to complete the level. A few levels feature an alternative gameplay mode in which a special engine is attached to the ship which the players must protect as it warps the ship to a new area. Up to ten creatures may be rescued per level. Creatures saved count towards improving the effectiveness of the ship by allowing two gems per station or unlocking new ship layouts.

== Development ==
Designer Matt Hammill described the development of Lovers as "almost an accident", having wanted to create a game for a game jam that "was supposed to be this small three-day thing". However, after the jam was over the development team wanted to continue on with the concept. The team sought to avoid "default gunmetal, chrome, cyberpunk textured-look", with Hammill stating that they wanted to go in the opposite direction. The team focused on a brighter aesthetic based on such sources as Sailor Moon and Katamari Damacy.

Lovers in a Dangerous Spacetime was showcased in July 2013 at PAX Prime. The game was released for Microsoft Windows, OS X, Linux, and Xbox One on September 9, 2015.

By 2016, the developers added 4-player co-op on top of the original 2-player co-op mode.

== Release ==
Lovers in a Dangerous Spacetime was released on September 9, 2015, for Microsoft Windows, Xbox One, OS X, and Linux, and on October 3, 2017, for Nintendo Switch.

In February 2016, Asteroid Base teamed up with the monthly subscription box service IndieBox to create an exclusive, custom-designed, physical release of the game. This limited collector's edition included, among others, a themed USB flash drive with DRM-free copy of the game, the original soundtrack on CD, a Steam key (downloadable on Windows, Mac, and Linux platforms), and various collectibles.

Lovers in a Dangerous Spacetime became free to members on Xbox Live Gold in February 2017 and to members on PS Plus in April 2017.

== Reception ==
Lovers in a Dangerous Spacetime received positive reviews from critics. Aggregate review website Metacritic assigned a score of 82/100 for the Xbox One and PlayStation 4 versions, and a score of 80/100 for the PC versions.

Simon Parkin from Eurogamer, playing the PC version, recommended the game. Destructoid awarded it a score of 10 out of 10, saying "If you've got a loved one to play with, do yourselves a favor and play this game as soon as possible, you won't regret your lovely journey through space." [sic]

== Awards and nominations ==
Year	Award	Presented by	Result
2014	Best Gameplay	Brazil's Independent Games Festival	Won
2014	Best Game	Brazil's Independent Games Festival	Nominated
2013	Excellence In Visual Art	Independent Games Festival	Nominated
