= 22nd British Academy Games Awards =

Game award ceremony in 2026

- Date: 17 April 2026
- Location: Queen Elizabeth Hall
- Hosted by: Elz the Witch
- Best Game: Clair Obscur: Expedition 33
- Most awards: Clair Obscur: Expedition 33 and Dispatch (3)
- Most nominations: Clair Obscur: Expedition 33 (12)

The 22nd British Academy Video Game Awards were hosted by the British Academy of Film and Television Arts on 17 April 2026 to honour the best video games of 2025. Held at the Queen Elizabeth Hall in London, the ceremony was hosted by content creator Elz the Witch for the first time.

Clair Obscur: Expedition 33 led the nominees, with twelve total nominations, and tied with Dispatch for most wins at the ceremony, with three. Clair Obscur won the top prize: Best Game.

== Background ==
=== Eligibility ===
Any game released between 16 November 2024 and 14 November 2025 was eligible for nomination.

=== Awards changes ===
For the 22nd BAFTA Games Awards, the following changes were announced:

- To bring the voting processes more in line with the Film Awards, BAFTA has created three additional craft chapters, allowing only members with experience in art, audio, and performance to participate in first round voting of their respective categories (Artistic Achievement, Audio Achievement, Performer in a Leading Role, and Performer in a Supporting Role). These chapters join the already established chapters who vote in the Game Design and Technical Achievement categories. Previously, the entire BAFTA membership would vote on these categories during round one.
- The criteria for the two performance categories has been amended to allow individuals to submit a supporting clip reel to highlight the best representation of their performance.
- The criteria for the Animation, Artistic Achievement, Audio Achievement, Game Design, Narrative, Music, and Technical Achievement categories has been amended to allow greater representation in nominations for individuals who made a significant creative contribution in their respective area.

=== Longlist ===
On 9 December 2025, the official longlist, featuring sixty-four games, was revealed in a YouTube livestream by British journalist Jane Douglas. Of the list, BAFTA chair Tara Saunders stated, “the BAFTA Games Awards longlists offers a fantastic opportunity to spotlight the creativity and craft shaping this year's games, ahead of nominations on March 12. It's a moment to acknowledge the breadth of remarkable work recognised by our wonderful BAFTA games members – 1,700 industry professionals whose expertise and passion continue to drive the games industry forward. This list showcases a wide range of games to dive into over the holiday season, honours the teams behind these standout titles and shines a light on the incredible skill across our whole industry.”

Clair Obscur: Expedition 33 led the longlist, with seventeen appearances, followed by Dispatch with eleven mentions, as well as Death Stranding 2: On the Beach and Indiana Jones and the Great Circle, each with ten mentions.

22nd BAFTA Games Awards Longlist
- Animation: Assassin's Creed Shadows, Battlefield 6, Clair Obscur: Expedition 33, Death Stranding 2: On the Beach, Dispatch, Donkey Kong Bananza, Ghost of Yōtei, Hades II, Hollow Knight: Silksong, Indiana Jones and the Great Circle
- Artistic Achievement: Clair Obscur: Expedition 33, Death Stranding 2: On the Beach, Dispatch, Ghost of Yōtei, Hades II, Hollow Knight: Silksong, Indiana Jones and the Great Circle, Kingdom Come: Deliverance II, South of Midnight, Sword of the Sea
- Audio Achievement: ARC Raiders, Battlefield 6, Clair Obscur: Expedition 33, Death Stranding 2: On the Beach, Dispatch, Ghost of Yōtei, Hades II, Indiana Jones and the Great Circle, Split Fiction, Vampire: The Masquerade – Bloodlines 2
- Best Game: ARC Raiders, Blue Prince, Clair Obscur: Expedition 33, Death Stranding 2: On the Beach, Dispatch, Ghost of Yōtei, Hades II, Hollow Knight: Silksong, Indiana Jones and the Great Circle, Split Fiction
- British Game: Atomfall, Citizen Sleeper 2: Starward Vector, F1 25, Jurassic World Evolution 3, Little Nightmares III, Mafia: The Old Country, Monument Valley 3, PowerWash Simulator 2, Two Point Museum, Vampire: The Masquerade – Bloodlines 2
- Debut Game: Blue Prince, Clair Obscur: Expedition 33, Consume Me, Date Everything!, Despelote, Dispatch, Is This Seat Taken?, The Midnight Walk, The Rogue Prince of Persia, Tiny Bookshop
- Evolving Game: Age of Empires II: Definitive Edition, Cyberpunk 2077, Fallout 76, Helldivers 2, Hitman World of Assassination, Marvel Rivals, No Man's Sky, Sea of Thieves, The Elder Scrolls Online, Vampire Survivors, Warhammer 40,000: Space Marine 2
- Family: Donkey Kong Bananza, EA Sports FC 26, Is This Seat Taken?, Lego Party, Mario Kart World, Monument Valley 3, Pokémon Legends: Z-A, PowerWash Simulator 2, Sonic Racing: CrossWorlds, Two Point Museum
- Game Beyond Entertainment: And Roger, Citizen Sleeper 2: Starward Vector, Clair Obscur: Expedition 33, Consume Me, Death Stranding 2: On the Beach, Despelote, Monument Valley 3, S.T.A.L.K.E.R. 2: Heart of Chornobyl, Silent Hill f, The Alters
- Game Design: Ball x Pit, Blue Prince, Clair Obscur: Expedition 33, Death Stranding 2: On the Beach, Donkey Kong Bananza, Ghost of Yōtei, Hades II, Indiana Jones and the Great Circle, Split Fiction, The Alters
- Multiplayer: ARC Raiders, Battlefield 6, Borderlands 4, Call of Duty: Black Ops 7, Dune: Awakening, Elden Ring Nightreign, Lego Party, Mario Kart World, Peak, Split Fiction
- Music: ARC Raiders, Blue Prince, Clair Obscur: Expedition 33, Death Stranding 2: On the Beach, Dispatch, Doom: The Dark Ages, Ghost of Yōtei, Hades II, Hollow Knight: Silksong, Indiana Jones and the Great Circle
- Narrative: Blue Prince, Clair Obscur: Expedition 33, Death Stranding 2: On the Beach, Dispatch, Ghost of Yōtei, Hades II, Indiana Jones and the Great Circle, Kingdom Come: Deliverance II, Split Fiction, The Alters
- New Intellectual Property: Absolum, ARC Raiders, Atomfall, Ball x Pit, Clair Obscur: Expedition 33, Dispatch, Peak, South of Midnight, Split Fiction, The Alters
- Performer in a Leading Role: Aaron Paul (Dispatch), Alex Jordan (The Alters), Ben Starr (Clair Obscur: Expedition 33), Erika Ishii (Ghost of Yōtei), Jennifer English (Clair Obscur: Expedition 33), Judy Alice Lee (Hades II), Kaja Chan (Split Fiction), Laura Bailey (Dispatch), Suzie Yeung (Silent Hill f), Tom McKay (Kingdom Come: Deliverance II), Troy Baker (Indiana Jones and the Great Circle)
- Performer in a Supporting Role: Alix Wilton Regan (Lies of P: Overture), Amelia Tyler (Hades II), Andy Serkis (Clair Obscur: Expedition 33), Charlie Cox (Clair Obscur: Expedition 33), David Menkin (Still Wakes the Deep: Siren's Rest), Jane Perry (Dead Take), Jeffrey Wright (Dispatch), Kirsty Rider (Clair Obscur: Expedition 33), Rich Keeble (Clair Obscur: Expedition 33), Troy Baker (Death Stranding 2: On the Beach)
- Technical Achievement: ARC Raiders, Battlefield 6, Clair Obscur: Expedition 33, Death Stranding 2: On the Beach, Donkey Kong Bananza, Doom: The Dark Ages, Ghost of Yōtei, Indiana Jones and the Great Circle, Kingdom Come: Deliverance II, Split Fiction

=== Fellowship ===
Finnish games executive and co-founder of Supercell Ilkka Paananen was announced as the recipient of the BAFTA Fellowship on 8 April 2026. In a statement, BAFTA CEO Jane Millichip explained, "It is a real privilege to honour Ilkka with the BAFTA Fellowship this year. A visionary leader in games, he has built a globally influential company while championing creative collaboration and trust at every level. His deep respect and commitment to nurturing emerging talent and his ongoing support for young people reflect the very best of BAFTA's values."

Shortly before the ceremony, a trailer for the upcoming game The Quiet Things was withdrawn. The game, which explores autobiographical themes including childhood trauma and abuse, had been scheduled for inclusion in the broadcast. The decision was described by the developer as having been communicated shortly beforehand and as distressing. BAFTA stated that the trailer was removed as a "compliance decision" due to potentially triggering content and insufficient time to provide appropriate audience warnings.

== Winners and nominees ==
First round voting took place between 18 November and 2 December 2025 to determine the official longlist, with all BAFTA membership voting on all categories aside from those selected by the specialised craft chapters. Second round voting took place for the Best Game and British Game categories between 3 and 12 February 2026 to determine the five nominees. The BAFTA juries for each category met on 25 February to narrow down to the five nominees in each of the other categories. The official nominees were announced on 12 March 2026. Third round voting to determine the winners will take place between 18 and 26 March 2026. The winners will be announced at the BAFTA Games Awards ceremony on 17 April 2026.

Best Game: Clair Obscur: Expedition 33 – Sandfall Interactive / Kepler Interactive; ARC Raiders – Embark Studios; Blue Prince – Dogubomb / Raw Fury; Dispatch – AdHoc Studio; Ghost of Yōtei – Sucker Punch Productions / Sony Interactive Entertainment; Indiana Jones and the Great Circle – MachineGames / Bethesda Softworks
Animation: Dispatch – AdHoc Studio; Battlefield 6; Death Stranding 2: On the Beach – Kojima Productions / Sony Interactive Entertainment; Ghost of Yōtei – Sucker Punch Productions / Sony Interactive Entertainment; Hades II – Supergiant Games; Hollow Knight: Silksong – Team Cherry	Artistic Achievement: Death Stranding 2: On the Beach – Kojima Productions / Sony Interactive Entertainment; Clair Obscur: Expedition 33 – Sandfall Interactive / Kepler Interactive; Dispatch – AdHoc Studio; Ghost of Yōtei – Sucker Punch Productions / Sony Interactive Entertainment; Hollow Knight: Silksong – Team Cherry; South of Midnight – Compulsion Games / Xbox Game Studios
Audio Achievement: Dispatch – AdHoc Studio; ARC Raiders – Embark Studios; Clair Obscur: Expedition 33 – Sandfall Interactive / Kepler Interactive; Death Stranding 2: On the Beach – Kojima Productions / Sony Interactive Entertainment; Ghost of Yōtei – Sucker Punch Productions / Sony Interactive Entertainment; Indiana Jones and the Great Circle – MachineGames / Bethesda Softworks	British Game: Atomfall – Rebellion Developments; Citizen Sleeper 2: Starward Vector – Jump Over the Age / Fellow Traveller; Mafia: The Old Country – Hangar 13 / 2K; Monument Valley 3 – Ustwo Games; PowerWash Simulator 2 – FuturLab; Two Point Museum – Two Point Studios / Sega
Debut Game: Clair Obscur: Expedition 33 – Sandfall Interactive / Kepler Interactive; Blue Prince – Dogubomb / Raw Fury; Consume Me – Jenny Jiao Hsia and AP Thomson / Hexacutable; Despelote – Julián Cordero, Sebastián Valbuena / Panic; Dispatch – AdHoc Studio; The Midnight Walk – MoonHood / Fast Travel Games	Evolving Game: No Man's Sky – HelloGames; Fallout 76 – Bethesda Game Studios / Bethesda Softworks; Helldivers 2 – Arrowhead Game Studios / Sony Interactive Entertainment; Hitman World of Assassination – IO Interactive; Vampire Survivors – Poncle; Warhammer 40,000: Space Marine 2 – Saber St. Petersburg / Focus Entertainment
Family: Lego Party – SMG Studio / Fictions; Donkey Kong Bananza – Nintendo EPD; Is This Seat Taken? – Poti Poti Studio / Wholesome Games; Mario Kart World – Nintendo EPD; PowerWash Simulator 2 – FuturLab; Two Point Museum – Two Point Studios / Sega	Game Beyond Entertainment: Despelote – Julián Cordero, Sebastián Valbuena / Panic; And Roger – TearyHand Studio / Kodansha; Citizen Sleeper 2: Starward Vector – Jump Over the Age / Fellow Traveller; Consume Me – Jenny Jiao Hsia and AP Thomson / Hexacutable; S.T.A.L.K.E.R. 2: Heart of Chornobyl – GSC Game World; The Alters – 11 Bit Studios
Game Design: Blue Prince – Dogubomb / Raw Fury; Ball x Pit – Kenny Sun / Devolver Digital; Clair Obscur: Expedition 33 – Sandfall Interactive / Kepler Interactive; Ghost of Yōtei – Sucker Punch Productions / Sony Interactive Entertainment; Hades II – Supergiant Games; Split Fiction – Hazelight Studios / Electronic Arts	Multiplayer: ARC Raiders – Embark Studios; Dune: Awakening – Funcom; Elden Ring Nightreign – FromSoftware / Bandai Namco Entertainment; Lego Party – SMG Studio / Fictions; Peak – Aggro Crab / Landfall Games; Split Fiction – Hazelight Studios / Electronic Arts
Music: Ghost of Yōtei – Sucker Punch Productions; Clair Obscur: Expedition 33 – Sandfall Interactive / Kepler Interactive; Death Stranding 2: On the Beach – Kojima Productions / Sony Interactive Entertainment; Dispatch – AdHoc Studio; Hollow Knight: Silksong – Team Cherry; Indiana Jones and the Great Circle – MachineGames / Bethesda Softworks	Narrative: Kingdom Come: Deliverance II – Warhorse Studios / Deep Silver; Blue Prince – Dogubomb / Raw Fury; Clair Obscur: Expedition 33 – Sandfall Interactive / Kepler Interactive; Death Stranding 2: On the Beach – Kojima Productions / Sony Interactive Entertainment; Indiana Jones and the Great Circle – MachineGames / Bethesda Softworks; The Alters – 11 Bit Studios
New Intellectual Property: South of Midnight – Compulsion Games / Xbox Game Studios; ARC Raiders – Embark Studios; Clair Obscur: Expedition 33 – Sandfall Interactive / Kepler Interactive; Dispatch – AdHoc Studio; Split Fiction – Hazelight Studios / Electronic Arts; The Alters – 11 Bit Studios	Performer in a Leading Role: Jennifer English as Maelle in Clair Obscur: Expedition 33; Aaron Paul as Robert Robertson in Dispatch; Ben Starr as Verso in Clair Obscur: Expedition 33; Erika Ishii as Atsu in Ghost of Yōtei; Tom McKay as Henry of Skalitz in Kingdom Come: Deliverance II; Troy Baker as Indiana Jones in Indiana Jones and the Great Circle
Performer in a Supporting Role: Jeffrey Wright as Chase in Dispatch; Alix Wilton Regan as Lea Florence Monad in Lies of P: Overture; Charlie Cox as Gustave in Clair Obscur: Expedition 33; Jane Perry as Lia Cain in Dead Take; Kirsty Rider as Lune in Clair Obscur: Expedition 33; Troy Baker as Higgs in Death Stranding 2: On the Beach	Technical Achievement: Ghost of Yōtei – Sucker Punch Productions / Sony Interactive Entertainment; ARC Raiders – Embark Studios; Death Stranding 2: On the Beach – Kojima Productions / Sony Interactive Entertainment; Doom: The Dark Ages – id Software / Bethesda Softworks; Indiana Jones and the Great Circle – MachineGames / Bethesda Softworks; Split Fiction – Hazelight Studios / Electronic Arts
BAFTA Fellowship: Ilkka Paananen

== Presenters and performers ==
- Charlie Cox – presented Multiplayer
- AlicesPixels – presented Artistic Achievement
- Shai Matheson – presented Evolving Game
- Angela Sant'Albano and Nick Apostolides – presented Performer in a Supporting Role
- Jade Scott and DanTDM – presented British Game
- Jane Douglas and Lucy James – presented Game Design
- Talia Mar – performed "Lady"
- Abubakar Salim – presented Animation
- Lee Petty – presented Technical Achievement
- James Phoon and Mei Mac – presented Family Game
- Big Zuu and AJ Tracey – presented Audio Achievement
- David Arnold – presented Music and introduced a 007 First Light sneak peek
- Mark Choi and the Sonaris Ensemble – performed "Suteki Da Ne" to celebrate the 25th anniversary of Final Fantasy X
- Alix Wilton Regan – presented Narrative
- Ludi Lin – presented New Intellectual Property
- Dylan Llewellyn and Emma Naomi – presented Debut Game
- Jacksepticeye and Erin Yvette – presented Game Beyond Entertainment
- David Gardner – presented the BAFTA Fellowship to Ilkka Paananen
- Lennie James – presented Performer in a Leading Role
- Swen Vincke – presented Best Game

== Games with multiple wins ==
Game	Wins
Clair Obscur: Expedition 33	3
Dispatch	3
Ghost of Yōtei	2

== Games with multiple nominations ==
Game	Nominations
Clair Obscur: Expedition 33	12
Dispatch	9
Ghost of Yōtei	8
Death Stranding 2: On the Beach	7
Indiana Jones and the Great Circle	6
ARC Raiders	5
Blue Prince	4
Split Fiction	4
Hollow Knight: Silksong	3
The Alters	3
Citizen Sleeper 2: Starward Vector	2
Consume Me	2
Despelote	2
Hades II	2
Kingdom Come: Deliverance II	2
Lego Party	2
PowerWash Simulator 2	2
South of Midnight	2
Two Point Museum	2
