= Moving Out =

Moving out may refer to:

- Relocation (personal), the act of leaving one dwelling and settling in another
- Leaving the nest, a young person moving out of the accommodation provided by their guardian, fosterers or parent

== Music ==
- Movin' Out (musical), a jukebox musical featuring the songs of Billy Joel
- "Movin' Out" (Aerosmith song), 1973
- "Movin' Out (Anthony's Song)", a song by Billy Joel
- Moving Out (album), by jazz saxophonist Sonny Rollins

== Film, television, and video games ==
- "Movin' Out (Brian's Song)", a Family Guy episode
- "Movin' Out" (Glee), a 2013 episode
- Moving Out (film), a 1983 Australian film
- Moving Out (video game), a 2020 simulation video game
  - Moving Out 2, a 2023 simulation video game
- "Moving Out", the first episode of the British television sitcom So What Now?
