= British Academy Games Award for Family =

Video game award

- Awarded for: The best game targeted to young audiences
- Country: United Kingdom
- Presented by: British Academy of Film and Television Arts
- Currently held by: Lego Party
- Website: www.bafta.org/games

The British Academy Video Games Award for Family is an award presented annually by the British Academy of Film and Television Arts (BAFTA). It is given in honor to "the best game experience for a family audience, whether played as individuals or as a group", the category is open for games with a PEGI age rating of 12 or under.

The category was first presented in 2004 at the 1st British Academy Games Awards under the name Children's Game to EyeToy: Play. The category has gone through several name changes since its inception, being known as Casual at the 4th and 5th British Academy Games Awards, while for the 6th edition, it was presented as Family & Social. Since the 7th British Academy Games Awards in 2008, it has been awarded under its current name. As developers, Nintendo EAD have received the most nominations in the category, with fourteen and are tied with Media Molecule for most wins, with two each. Ubisoft hold the record for most nominations without a win, with five. For publishers, Sony Interactive Entertainment leads the nominations with twenty five, while Nintendo leads the wins with seven. Activision have the most nominations without a win, with eight.

The current holder of the award is Lego Party by SMG Studio and published by Fictions, which won at the 22nd British Academy Games Awards in 2026.

== Winners and nominees ==
In the following table, the years are listed as per BAFTA convention, and generally correspond to the year of game release in the United Kingdom.

Table key
Indicates the winner

Year	Game	Developer(s)	Publisher(s)	Ref.
2002/03 (1st)	EyeToy: Play	London Studio	Sony Computer Entertainment	
2002/03 (1st)	Disney Sports Soccer	Konami		
2002/03 (1st)	Dog's Life	Frontier Developments	Sony Computer Entertainment	
2002/03 (1st)	Sly Cooper and the Thievius Raccoonus	Sucker Punch Productions	Sony Computer Entertainment	
2002/03 (1st)	Pokémon Ruby and Sapphire	Game Freak	The Pokémon Company	
2002/03 (1st)	Wallace & Gromit in Project Zoo	Frontier Developments	BAM! Entertainment	
2003/04 (2nd)	Donkey Konga	Namco	Nintendo	
2003/04 (2nd)	EyeToy: Groove	London Studio	Sony Computer Entertainment	
2003/04 (2nd)	EyeToy: Play 2	London Studio	Sony Computer Entertainment	
2003/04 (2nd)	SingStar / SingStar Party	London Studio	Sony Computer Entertainment	
2003/04 (2nd)	Sly 2: Band of Thieves	Sucker Punch Productions	Sony Computer Entertainment	
2003/04 (2nd)	Shrek 2	Luxoflux	Activision	
2005/06 (3rd)	LocoRoco	Japan Studio	Sony Computer Entertainment	
2005/06 (3rd)	Ice Age II: The Meltdown	Eurocom	Sierra Entertainment, Fox Interactive and Vivendi Universal Games	
2005/06 (3rd)	Daxter	Ready at Dawn	Sony Computer Entertainment	
2005/06 (3rd)	Lego Star Wars II: The Original Trilogy	Traveller's Tales	LucasArts	
2005/06 (3rd)	New Super Mario Bros.	Nintendo EAD	Nintendo	
2005/06 (3rd)	We Love Katamari	Namco		
2006/07 (4th)	Wii Sports	Nintendo EAD	Nintendo	
2006/07 (4th)	Cake Mania	Sandlot Games		
2006/07 (4th)	Big Brain Academy for Wii	Nintendo Entertainment Analysis & Development Group No. 4	Nintendo	
2006/07 (4th)	Guitar Hero II	Harmonix	Activision	
2006/07 (4th)	More Brain Training	Nintendo SPD	Nintendo	
2006/07 (4th)	SingStar	London Studio	Sony Computer Entertainment	
2007/08 (5th)	Boom Blox	EA Los Angeles and Amblin Interactive	Electronic Arts	
2007/08 (5th)	Buzz!: Quiz TV	Relentless Software	Sony Computer Entertainment Europe	
2007/08 (5th)	Guitar Hero World Tour	Neversoft	Activision	
2007/08 (5th)	LittleBigPlanet	Media Molecule	Sony Computer Entertainment	
2007/08 (5th)	SingStar Vol. 2	London Studio	Sony Computer Entertainment	
2007/08 (5th)	Wii Fit	Nintendo EAD Group No. 5	Nintendo	
2009 (6th)	Wii Sports Resort	Nintendo EAD Group No. 2	Nintendo	
2009 (6th)	The Beatles: Rock Band	Harmonix	MTV Games	
2009 (6th)	Buzz! Quiz World	Relentless Software	Sony Computer Entertainment Europe	
2009 (6th)	EyePet	London Studio and Playlogic Game Factory	Sony Computer Entertainment	
2009 (6th)	Guitar Hero 5	Neversoft	Activision	
2009 (6th)	New Super Mario Bros. Wii	Nintendo EAD	Nintendo	
2010 (7th)	Kinect Sports	Rare	Microsoft Game Studios	
2010 (7th)	Dance Central	Harmonix	MTV Games	
2010 (7th)	Kinect Adventures!	Good Science Studio	Microsoft Game Studios	
2010 (7th)	Kinectimals	Frontier Developments	Microsoft Game Studios	
2010 (7th)	Lego Harry Potter: Years 1–4	Traveller's Tales	Warner Bros. Interactive Entertainment	
2010 (7th)	Toy Story 3: The Video Game	Avalanche Software	Disney Interactive Studios	
2011 (8th)	LittleBigPlanet 2	Media Molecule	Sony Computer Entertainment Europe	
2011 (8th)	Dance Central 2	Harmonix	Microsoft Game Studios	
2011 (8th)	Lego Pirates of the Caribbean: The Video Game	Traveller's Tales	Disney Interactive Studios	
2011 (8th)	Lego Star Wars III: The Clone Wars	Traveller's Tales	LucasArts	
2011 (8th)	Kinect Sports: Season Two	Rare and BigPark	Microsoft Studios	
2011 (8th)	Mario Kart 7	Nintendo EAD Group No. 1 and Retro Studios	Nintendo	
2012 (9th)	Lego Batman 2: DC Super Heroes	Traveller's Tales	Warner Bros. Interactive Entertainment	
2012 (9th)	Minecraft: Xbox 360 Edition	Mojang	Microsoft Studios	
2012 (9th)	Just Dance 4	Ubisoft		
2012 (9th)	Skylanders: Giants	Toys for Bob	Activision and Vivendi Games	
2012 (9th)	Clay Jam	Fat Pebble	Zynga	
2012 (9th)	Lego The Lord of the Rings	Traveller's Tales	Warner Bros. Interactive Entertainment	
2013 (10th)	Tearaway	Tarsier Studios and Media Molecule	Sony Computer Entertainment Europe	
2013 (10th)	Animal Crossing: New Leaf	Nintendo EAD	Nintendo	
2013 (10th)	Super Mario 3D World	Nintendo EAD Tokyo and 1-Up Studio	Nintendo	
2013 (10th)	Skylanders: Swap Force	Vicarious Visions	Activision	
2013 (10th)	Rayman Legends	Michel Ancel, Christophe Heral and Jean-Christophe Alessandri, Ubisoft	Ubisoft	
2013 (10th)	Brothers: A Tale of Two Sons	Starbreeze Studios	505 Games	
2014 (11th)	Minecraft: Console Editions	Mojang and 4J Studios	Microsoft Studios	
2014 (11th)	The Lego Movie Videogame	TT Games	Warner Bros. Interactive Entertainment	
2014 (11th)	LittleBigPlanet 3	Pete Smith, Paul Porter and Darius Sardeghian, Sumo Digital and XDev Studios Europe	Sony Computer Entertainment Europe	
2014 (11th)	Mario Kart 8	Nintendo		
2014 (11th)	Skylanders: Trap Team	Toys for Bob and Vicarious Visions	Activision	
2014 (11th)	Twelve a Dozen	Bossa Studios		
2015 (12th)	Rocket League	Psyonix		
2015 (12th)	Disney Infinity 3.0	John Blackburn, John Vignocchi and Bob Lowe, Avalanche Software	Disney Interactive Studios	
2015 (12th)	FIFA 16	EA Canada	EA Sports	
2015 (12th)	Guitar Hero Live	FreeStyleGames	Activision	
2015 (12th)	Lego Dimensions	Jon Burton, James McLoughlin and Nick Ricks, TT Games	Warner Bros. Interactive Entertainment	
2015 (12th)	Super Mario Maker	Nintendo EAD	Nintendo	
2016 (13th)	Overcooked	Ghost Town Games	Team17	
2016 (13th)	Lego Star Wars: The Force Awakens	Mike Taylor, Jamie Eden and James Norton, TT Games	Warner Bros. Interactive Entertainment	
2016 (13th)	The Playroom VR	Japan Studio	Sony Interactive Entertainment	
2016 (13th)	Ratchet and Clank	Insomniac Games	Sony Interactive Entertainment	
2016 (13th)	Pokémon Go	Niantic		
2016 (13th)	Toca Hair Salon 3	Toca Boca		
2017 (14th)	Super Mario Odyssey	Nintendo EDP	Nintendo	
2017 (14th)	Just Dance 2018	Ubisoft Paris	Ubisoft	
2017 (14th)	Mario + Rabbids: Kingdom Battle	Ubisoft Milan	Ubisoft	
2017 (14th)	Lego Worlds	TT Games	Warner Bros. Interactive Entertainment	
2017 (14th)	Monument Valley 2	ustwo games		
2017 (14th)	Snipperclips	SFB Games	Nintendo	
2018 (15th)	Nintendo Labo	Nintendo EDP	Nintendo	
2018 (15th)	Lego Disney Pixar's The Incredibles	TT Games	WB Games	
2018 (15th)	Super Mario Party	NDCube	Nintendo	
2018 (15th)	Overcooked 2	Ghost Town Games and Team17	Team17	
2018 (15th)	Yoku's Island Express	Villa Gorilla	Team17	
2018 (15th)	Pokémon: Let's Go, Pikachu! and Let's Go, Eevee!	Game Freak	The Pokémon Company and Nintendo	
2019 (16th)	Untitled Goose Game	House House	Panic	
2019 (16th)	Concrete Genie	Pixelopus	Sony Interactive Entertainment	
2019 (16th)	Knights and Bikes	Rex Crowle, Moo Yu, Kenneth C M Young (Foam Sword)	Double Fine Presents	
2019 (16th)	Luigi's Mansion 3	Next Level Games	Nintendo	
2019 (16th)	Vacation Simulator	Owlchemy Labs		
2019 (16th)	Wattam	Funomena	Annapurna Interactive	
2020 (17th)	Sackboy: A Big Adventure	Sumo Digital	Sony Interactive Entertainment	
2020 (17th)	Animal Crossing: New Horizons	Nintendo EPD	Nintendo	
2020 (17th)	Astro's Playroom	Japan Studio	Sony Interactive Entertainment	
2020 (17th)	Dreams	Media Molecule	Sony Interactive Entertainment	
2020 (17th)	Fall Guys	Mediatonic	Devolver Digital	
2020 (17th)	Minecraft Dungeons	Mojang Studios	Double Eleven	
2021 (18th)	Chicory: A Colorful Tale	Greg Lobanov	Finji	
2021 (18th)	Alba: A Wildlife Adventure	ustwo games		
2021 (18th)	Forza Horizon 5	Playground Games	Xbox Game Studios	
2021 (18th)	Mario Party Superstars	NDcube	Nintendo	
2021 (18th)	Ratchet & Clank: Rift Apart	Insomniac Games	Sony Interactive Entertainment	
2021 (18th)	Unpacking	Witch Beam	Humble Bundle	
2022 (19th)	Kirby and the Forgotten Land	HAL Laboratory	Nintendo	
2022 (19th)	Disney Dreamlight Valley	Gameloft		
2022 (19th)	Lego Star Wars: The Skywalker Saga	TT Games	Warner Bros Interactive	
2022 (19th)	Mario + Rabbids Sparks of Hope	Ubisoft		
2022 (19th)	Nintendo Switch Sports	Nintendo EPD		
2022 (19th)	Teenage Mutant Ninja Turtles: Shredder's Revenge	Tribute Games	Dotemu	
2023 (20th)	Super Mario Bros. Wonder	Nintendo EPD	Nintendo	
2023 (20th)	Cocoon	Geometric Interactive	Annapurna Interactive	
2023 (20th)	Dave the Diver	Mintrocket		
2023 (20th)	Disney Illusion Island	Dlala Studios	Disney	
2023 (20th)	Hi-Fi Rush	Tango Gameworks	Bethesda Softworks	
2023 (20th)	Hogwarts Legacy	Avalanche Software	Warner Bros. Games	
2024 (21st)	Astro Bot	Team Asobi	Sony Interactive Entertainment	
2024 (21st)	Cat Quest III	The Gentlebros	Kepler Interactive	
2024 (21st)	Lego Horizon Adventures	Guerrilla Games, Studio Gobo	Sony Interactive Entertainment	
2024 (21st)	Little Kitty, Big City	Double Dagger Studio		
2024 (21st)	The Plucky Squire	All Possible Futures	Devolver Digital	
2024 (21st)	Super Mario Party Jamboree	Nintendo Cube	Nintendo	
2025 (22nd)	Lego Party	SMG Studio	Fictions	
2025 (22nd)	Donkey Kong Bananza	Nintendo EPD	Nintendo	
2025 (22nd)	Is This Seat Taken?	Poti Poti Studio	Wholesome Games	
2025 (22nd)	Mario Kart World	Nintendo EPD	Nintendo	
2025 (22nd)	PowerWash Simulator 2	FuturLab		
2025 (22nd)	Two Point Museum	Two Point Studios	Sega	

== Multiple nominations and wins ==
=== Developers ===
Developer	Nominations	Wins
Nintendo EAD	14	2
London Studio	7	1
Traveller's Tales	6	1
Ubisoft	5	0
Harmonix	4	0
Media Molecule	4	2
Frontier Developments	3	0
Japan Studio	3	1
Mojang	3	1
Avalanche Software	2	0
Game Freak	2	0
Ghost Town Games	2	1
Insomniac Games	2	0
Namco	2	1
NDcube	2	0
Neversoft	2	0
Rare	2	1
Relentless Software	2	0
Sucker Punch Productions	2	0
Sumo Digital	2	1
Toys for Bob	2	0
Ustwo Games	2	0
Vicarious Visions	2	0

=== Publishers ===
Developer	Nominations	Wins
Sony Computer/Interactive Entertainment	25	5
Nintendo	25	7
Activision	8	0
Microsoft/Xbox Game Studios	8	2
Warner Bros Interactive	9	1
Ubisoft	5	0
Disney Interactive Studios	3	0
Team17	3	1
Annapurna Interactive	2	0
LucasArts	2	0
MTV Games	2	0
The Pokémon Company	2	0
Ustwo Games	2	0
Vivendi Games	2	0
