= Needle in a Haystack Simulator =

2026 upcoming video game

Needle In A Haystack Simulator
- Steam storefront header
- Developer: Nas Nakarus
- Publisher: Nas Nakarus
- Designer: Nas Nakarus
- Programmer: Nas Nakarus
- Artist: Nas Nakarus
- Platform: Windows
- Release: Q4 2026
- Genre: Simulation
- Modes: Single-player, multiplayer

Needle In A Haystack Simulator is an upcoming casual and simulation video game developed and published by Studio Bitdot, a company owned by indie game developer Nas Nakarus.

== Gameplay ==
Needle In A Haystack Simulator is a first-person, casual simulation video game in which the player has to dig through a haystack consisting of five million pieces of hay in order to find a needle. The player can find valuables which can be sold to buy tools which allow for larger amounts of hay to be moved and processed. It can be played multi-player.

== Development ==
The game is developed by indie game developer Nas Nakarus under his label Studio BitDot.

Footage of the game as a development experiment went viral on X, quickly gaining around 50 million views and over 200,000 likes. Nakarus stated the project was meant to be an extreme boundary for players who wanted to treat repetitive and mundane tasks as a meditative activity. The concept originated as a satirical thought experiment regarding the commercial success of highly granular, repetitive simulation games. The game, released for Microsoft Windows, is expected to release in the fourth quarter of 2026.

== Reception ==
Polygon writer Rebecca Corgan reports that the game has been criticized for being an example of "sort slop."

== See also ==
- PowerWash Simulator
