= Lego Party =

2025 video game

- Developer: SMG Studio
- Publisher: Fictions
- Director: Mark Fennell
- Composers: Brad Gentle; The DA's Office; David Huxtable; Rory Chenoweth; Sam Marks; Sig Pierson; Mitch Stewart; David Bruggerman; Adam Sofo
- Series: Lego
- Engine: Unity
- Platforms: Nintendo Switch; Nintendo Switch 2; PlayStation 4; PlayStation 5; Windows; Xbox One; Xbox Series X/S
- Release: September 30, 2025; Nintendo Switch 2; July 30, 2026
- Genre: Party
- Mode: Multiplayer

Lego Party (stylized as LEGO Party!) is a 2025 party video game developed by SMG Studio and published by Fictions. It was released on September 30, 2025 for Nintendo Switch, PlayStation 4, PlayStation 5, Windows, Xbox One and Xbox Series X/S, with a Nintendo Switch 2 version released on July 30, 2026.

== Gameplay ==
Lego Party is heavily inspired by franchises such as Mario Party, allowing four players to compete by rolling numbers and progressing through various boards. There are four levels to choose from, each inspired by an existing Lego theme, such as Lego Ninjago, Lego Pirates, and Lego Space. Varying spots on the board will have effects on the player, such as handing them a disadvantage through traps or allowing them to progress further with shortcuts.

After the four players have completed one round, a bonus game will begin from a pool of over 60 unique minigames. Examples of minigames in Lego Party include balancing on a unicycle to win a race, and jumping over a spinning octopus tentacle until one player remains standing. Minigames can also be triggered during a round by landing on a unique tile, which will trigger a 2-vs-2 game forcing players to form a duo and temporarily work together.

The winner(s) of the chosen minigame will receive Lego studs, similar to Mario Party's coins, which can be spent on modifiers to gain an advantage on the board. For example, players can earn movement modifiers to land on spots with golden bricks.

== Development and release ==
Lego Party! was first announced at Summer Game Fest with a release window of late 2025. It was developed by Australian team SMG Studio, who is best known for the 2020 game Moving Out, and it is the first game published by Fictions since their formation. The game was directed by SMG Studio project director Mark Fennell. Lego Party was developed in the Unity 3D engine.

During development of the game, over 100 playtests were completed with families of all ages to determine ways to make the game accessible. Some children cried during these playtests due to unforgiving rules where golden bricks would be indiscriminately stolen from their inventory. This feedback prompted the developers to enable a mercy choice which lets players decide if they want to steal a brick or not.

== Reception ==
Reception

Aggregate score
Aggregator	Score
OpenCritic	83% recommend

Early previews of Lego Party! were conducted at Summer Game Fest with 30-minute play sessions for journalists. Christopher Cruz of Rolling Stone included Lego Party on his list of best games at the event, calling it "ludicrously fun" and describing it as "potentially the best modern contender for the casual couch boardgame crown". Matt Kim of IGN pointed out the game's accessibility across platforms, concluding that if "the rest of the games are anywhere near as fun as the handful that [IGN] played, I can see Lego Party having the kind of addictive appeal Mario Party has had – which is especially good news for PlayStation and Xbox players that don't have access to Mario Party".

=== Awards ===
Year	Award	Category	Result	Ref.
2025	The Game Awards 2025	Best Family Game	Nominated	
2026	15th New York Game Awards	Central Park Children’s Zoo Award for Best Kids Game	Nominated	
2026	29th Annual D.I.C.E. Awards	Family Game of the Year	Won	
2026	22nd British Academy Games Awards	Family	Won	
2026	22nd British Academy Games Awards	Multiplayer	Nominated	
