= Is This Seat Taken? =

2025 video game

- Developer: Poti Poti Studio
- Publisher: Wholesome Games
- Designers: Sergi Pérez Crespo; Ausiàs Dalmau Roig
- Programmer: Ausiàs Dalmau Roig
- Artist: Sergi Pérez Crespo
- Writers: Alexis Cosano Rodríguez; James Tillman; Matthew Taylor
- Composer: Rupert Cole
- Platforms: Android iOS; Linux macOS; Nintendo Switch; Windows
- Release: August 7, 2025
- Genre: Puzzle
- Mode: Single-player

Is This Seat Taken? is a 2025 puzzle video game developed by Poti Poti Studio and published by Wholesome Games. It was released on Android, iOS, Linux, macOS, Nintendo Switch, and Windows on August 7, 2025.

Is This Seat Taken? received positive reviews from critics.

== Gameplay ==
Is This Seat Taken? is a logic puzzle game set in a world of sentient shapes. Each level depicts a scenario in which the player must arrange these shapes until they all are satisfied with their position. Examples include shapes who wish to be seated next to a specific person, next to a window, or away from loud music. There are five worlds, each themed after a world city (those being Barcelona, Brussels, London and New York City, with Barcelona being repeated as the final world), with each world containing five or six levels, and the levels themselves being divided up into three or four sections. By satisfying all shapes within a level, the player earns a star, and earning all stars within a world unlocks that world's special level.

== Story ==
Aspiring rhombus actor Nat attempts to meet their idol Luca and get the confidence they need. On their way, they encounter characters like their best friend Alexis, Val and Koda. In the game, Nat struggles by feeling unworthy and different because they believe they are not a "normal shape". However, after facing all their triumphs and hardships they learn that they can do it and that they are no different than the other shapes.

== Development ==
Is This Seat Taken? was announced on January 30, 2025. It is developed by Poti Poti Studio, an independent game developer with members based in Brussels, Belgium; and Barcelona, Spain. A demo was released as a part of Steam Next Fest on February 10.

At the Wholesome Direct 2025, Poti Poti Studio announced a release window of August 2025.

On August 7, 2025, during the Indie World presentation, the game was announced to be coming to the Nintendo Switch that same day.

== Reception ==
Reception

Aggregate scores
Aggregator	Score
Metacritic	(NS) 84/100 (PC) 79/100
OpenCritic	90% recommend

Review scores
Publication	Score
Game Informer	9.25/10
GamesRadar+	3.5/5
Nintendo Life	7/10
Nintendo World Report	9/10
Shacknews	8/10

Is This Seat Taken? received "generally favorable" reviews, according to review aggregator Metacritic. According to OpenCritic, 90% of critics recommended the game.

Jenny Windom of Wholesome Games said, "So seeing this game that took this very, very mundane thing of sitting on a bus and finding your seat and then making it really joyful and in a lot of ways magical and fun and memorable, I think, it utterly charmed me. And I remember playing it and thinking, 'I can’t wait for the next levels. I want to see more.' And that initial just charm was really what attracted my attention."

=== Accolades ===
Year	Award	Category	Result	Ref.
2026	15th New York Game Awards	A-Train Award for Best Mobile Game	Won	
2026	Independent Games Festival	Excellence in Design	Honorable mention	
2026	Independent Games Festival	Excellence in Visual Arts	Honorable mention	
2026	22nd British Academy Games Awards	Debut Game	Longlisted	
2026	22nd British Academy Games Awards	Family	Nominated	
