= Despelote =

2025 slice-of-life video game

- Developers: Julián Cordero; Sebastián Valbuena
- Publisher: Panic
- Producer: Gabe Cuzzillo
- Programmer: Julián Cordero
- Composer: Sebastián Valbuena
- Engine: Unity
- Platforms: PlayStation 4; PlayStation 5; Windows; Xbox One; Xbox Series X/S; macOS; Nintendo Switch
- Release: PS4, PS5, Windows, Xbox One, Xbox Series X/S: WW: May 1, 2025; macOS: WW: September 8, 2025; Switch: NA/SA: December 11, 2025; JP: December 18, 2025; WW: January 13, 2026
- Genre: Adventure
- Mode: Single-player

Despelote is a first-person adventure video game and that released on 1 May 2025. It is slice-of-life set in Quito during Ecuador's qualification for the 2002 FIFA World Cup, where the player is able to explore and play with a soccer ball in the city. The game is autobiographical and from the perspective of an eight year old Julián Cordero, one of the developers.

== Gameplay ==
Gameplay screenshot.

Despelote is a first-person narrative exploration game, mostly set in Quito in 2001. Players wander the city as an eight year old Julián Cordero, the designer of the game, and interact with locals, observe street life, and use a soccer ball to engage with the environment. The ball can be kicked, passed, and used to trigger small vignettes and conversations that reveal the community's mood during Ecuador's 2002 World Cup qualifying run. The game emphasizes ambient storytelling, with unscripted-feeling encounters rather than traditional objectives or puzzles. It incorporates flash-forward moments, with the player controlling Cordero as a teenager, as well.

== Development ==
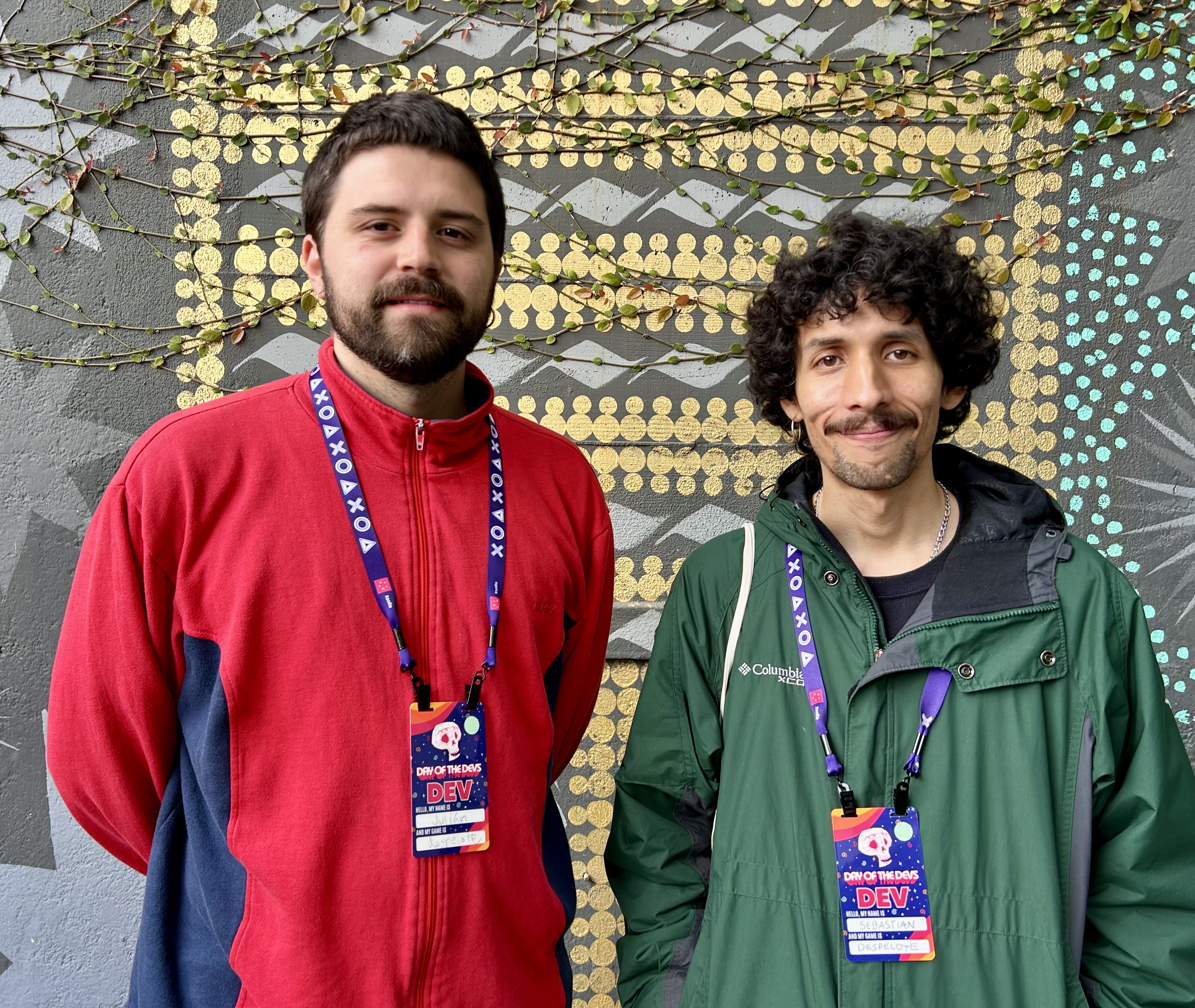
The two developers of Despelote in March 2025: Julián Cordero and Sebastian Valbuena.

Julián Cordero initially conceived of a game about the "universal language" of football, inspired by his childhood in Ecuador and his time in New York City. Cordero wanted the game to avoid the look of high budget sport games like FIFA, which did not represent the soccer that he grew up with.

After realizing that the game was not working in that format, Cordero's New York University Professor Gabe Cuzzillo, the designer of Ape Out, suggested that Cordero bring the "place" of Quito to the front of the game, using documentary audio and visual design in addition to the gameplay.

== Reception ==
=== Critical reception ===
Reception

Aggregate score
Aggregator	Score
OpenCritic	78% recommend (Note: Based on 41 reviews)

Despelote received positive marks from critics. Eurogamer's Chris Tapsell called the game something "personal and universal all at once" and praised how the developers handled the experience of childhood memories. Polygon's Oli Welsh felt that Despelote felt "fully realized" and said that it might "be the best game ever about childhood." The Guardian's Keith Stuart compared the game favorably to "the great works of independent game design", such as The Unfinished Swan, Gravity Bone, and Virginia. Stuart also called the game "fascinating, formally daring stuff." Rock Paper Shotgun's Graham Smith praised the game generally as a football fan, commenting "In a medium often dominated by genre pastiche and YA fiction tropes, what a treat it is to have a video game that feels true."

RPGFan's Tom Naylor noted in a generally positive review that the kicking controls can be "finicky" and cautioned that the game was relatively short. Slant Magazine's Steven Scaife instead felt that the game's "underlying clumsiness" in its first-person sections helped to capture its "vision of a messy childhood."

=== Awards ===
Year	Award	Category	Result	Ref.
2025	Independent Games Festival	Seumas McNally Grand Prize	Nominated	
2025	Independent Games Festival	Excellence in Audio	Won	
2025	Independent Games Festival	Excellence in Narrative	Nominated	
2025	Independent Games Festival	Nuovo Award	Nominated	
2025	Golden Joystick Awards	Best Indie Game	Nominated	
2025	The Game Awards 2025	Games for Impact	Nominated	
2025	The Game Awards 2025	Best Debut Indie Game	Nominated	
2026	15th New York Game Awards	Big Apple Award for Best Game of the Year	Nominated	
2026	15th New York Game Awards	Off Broadway Award for Best Indie Game	Nominated	
2026	15th New York Game Awards	Excelsior Award for Best New York Game	Nominated	
2026	29th Annual D.I.C.E. Awards	Outstanding Achievement for an Independent Game	Nominated	
2026	29th Annual D.I.C.E. Awards	Outstanding Achievement in Story	Nominated	
2026	26th Game Developers Choice Awards	Best Narrative	Nominated	
2026	26th Game Developers Choice Awards	Social Impact	Nominated	
2026	22nd British Academy Games Awards	Debut Game	Nominated	
2026	22nd British Academy Games Awards	Game Beyond Entertainment	Won	
