= 26th Game Developers Choice Awards =

2026 awards ceremony in California, US

- Date: March 12, 2026
- Venue: Moscone Center; San Francisco, California
- Hosted by: Sam Maggs

Highlights
- Most awards: Clair Obscur: Expedition 33 (5)
- Most nominations: Clair Obscur: Expedition 33 (8)
- Lifetime Achievement Award: Don Daglow
- Ambassador Award: Rebecca Ann Heineman
- Game of the Year: Clair Obscur: Expedition 33

The 26th Game Developers Choice Awards was an award ceremony honoring outstanding achievements by game developers and video games released in 2025. The event took place on March 12, 2026, at the Moscone Center in San Francisco, California and was hosted by Sam Maggs. It was held alongside the Independent Games Festival awards.

== Winners and nominees ==
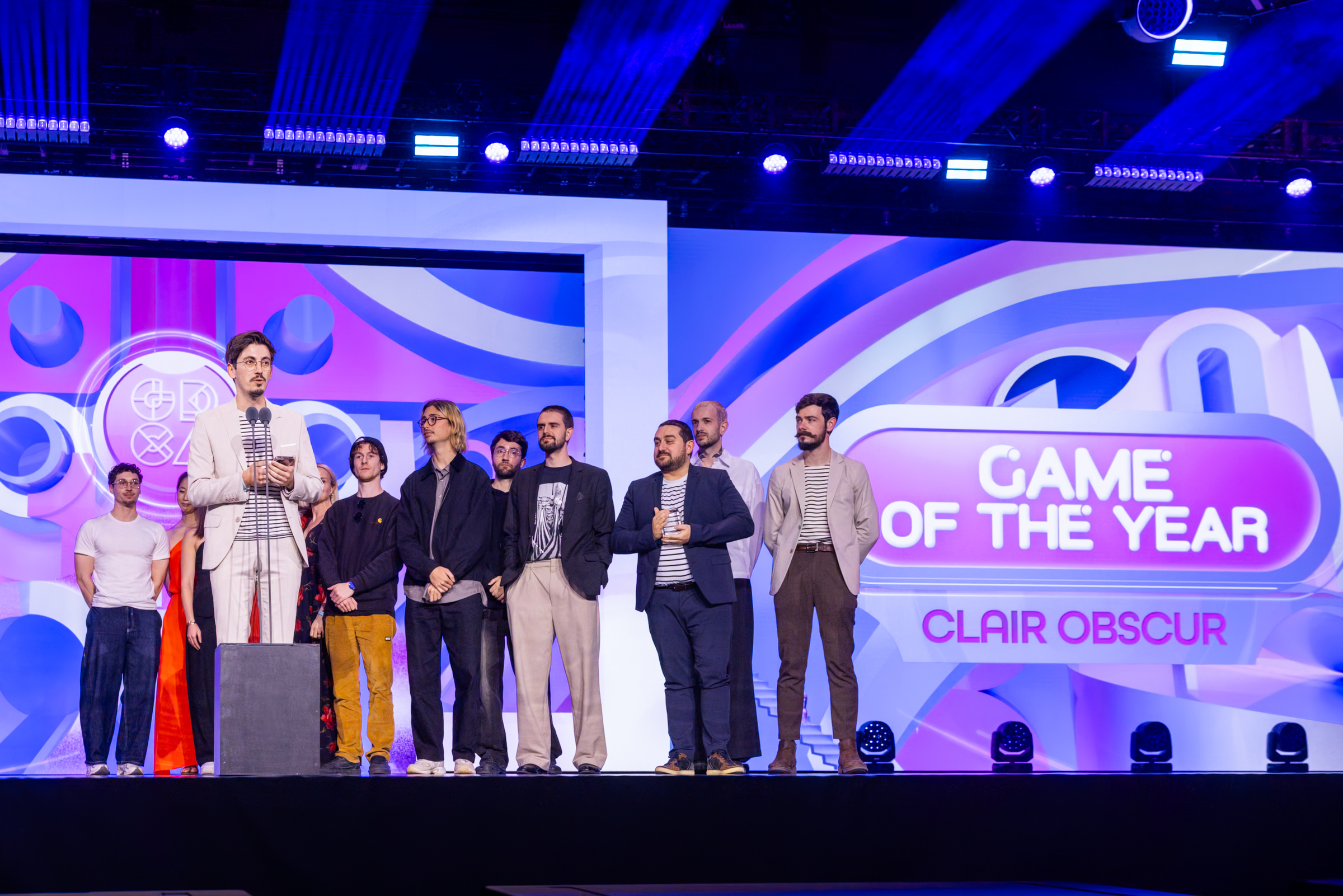
The Game of the Year Award was given to Sandfall Interactive for their work on Clair Obscur: Expedition 33.

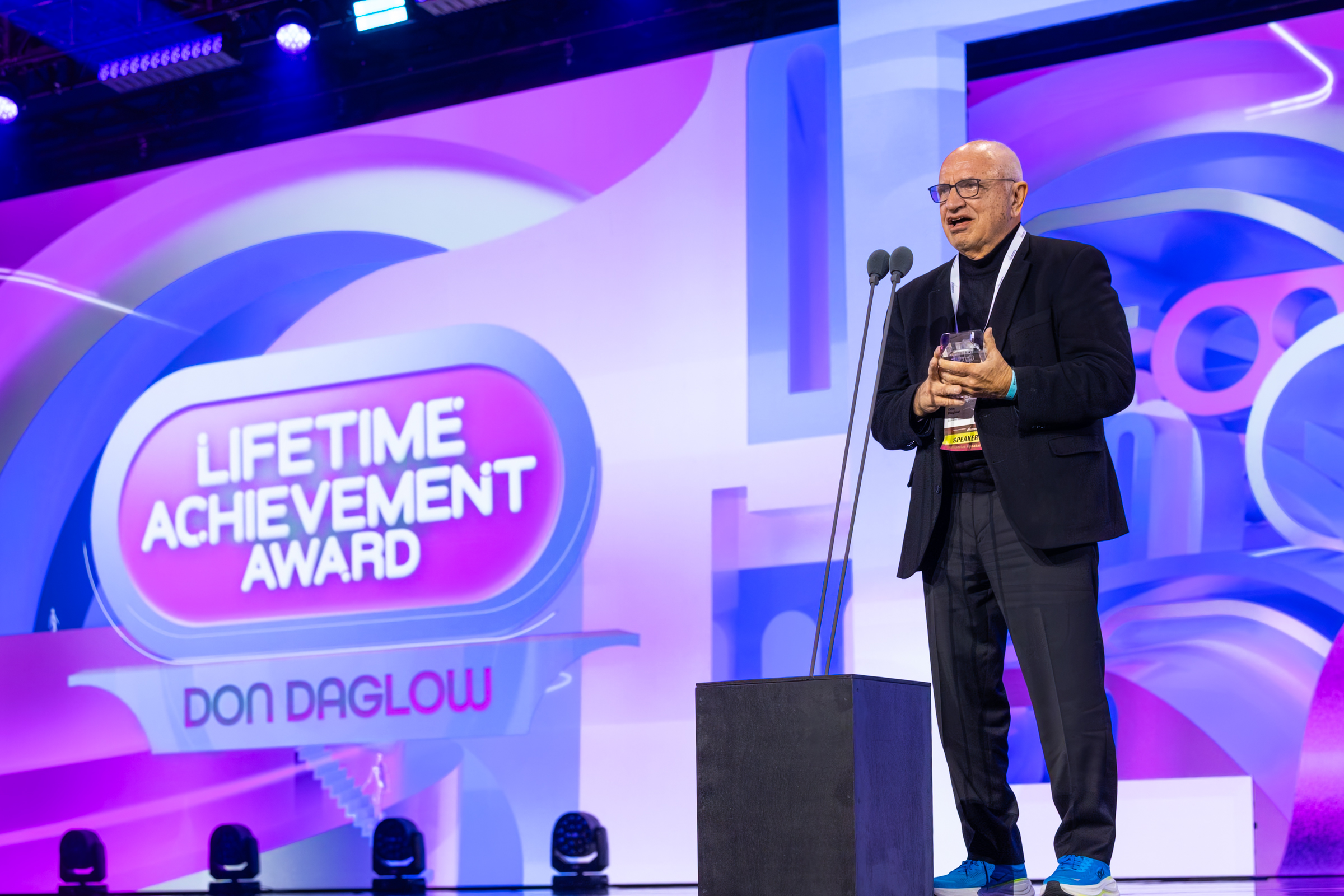
Don Daglow received the Lifetime Achievement Award.

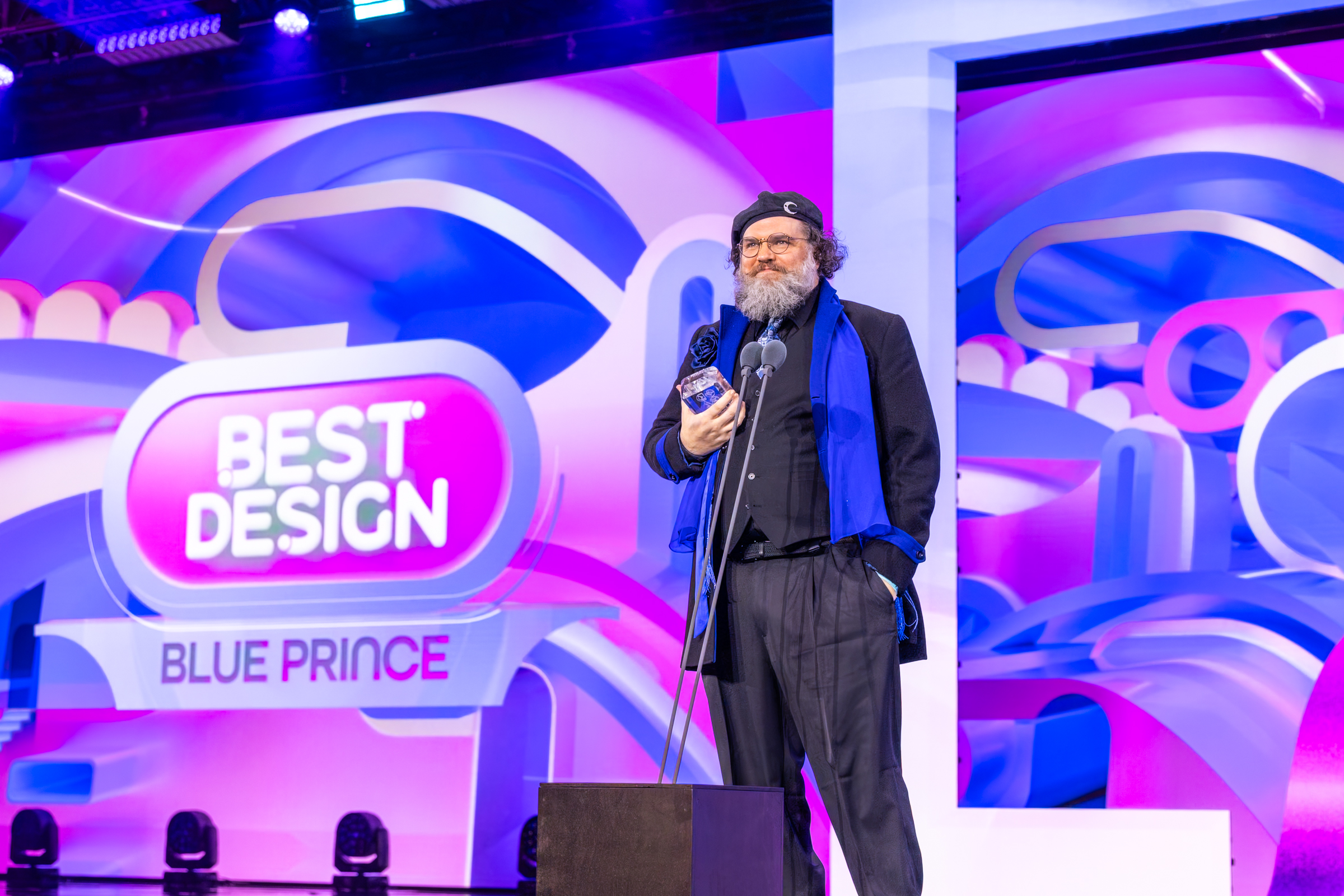
Dogubomb received the Best Design award for their game Blue Prince.

=== Game of the Year ===
- Clair Obscur: Expedition 33 (Sandfall Interactive/Kepler Interactive)
  - Blue Prince (Dogubomb/Raw Fury)
  - Donkey Kong Bananza (Nintendo EDP/Nintendo)
  - Ghost of Yōtei (Sucker Punch Productions/Sony Interactive Entertainment)
  - Hollow Knight: Silksong (Team Cherry)
  - Split Fiction (Hazelight Studios/Electronic Arts)

=== Best Audio ===
- Clair Obscur: Expedition 33 (Sandfall Interactive/Kepler Interactive)
  - Death Stranding 2: On the Beach (Kojima Productions/Sony Interactive Entertainment)
  - Ghost of Yōtei (Sucker Punch Productions/Sony Interactive Entertainment)
  - Rift of the NecroDancer (Brace Yourself Games/Tic Toe Games/Klei Entertainment)
  - South of Midnight (Compulsion Games/Xbox Game Studios)

=== Best Debut ===
- Clair Obscur: Expedition 33 (Sandfall Interactive/Kepler Interactive)
  - Ball x Pit (Kenny Sun/Devolver Digital)
  - Blue Prince (Dogubomb/Raw Fury)
  - Dispatch (AdHoc Studio)

=== Best Design ===
- Blue Prince (Dogubomb/Raw Fury)
  - Ball x Pit (Kenny Sun/Devolver Digital)
  - Clair Obscur: Expedition 33 (Sandfall Interactive/Kepler Interactive)
  - Donkey Kong Bananza (Nintendo EDP/Nintendo)
  - Split Fiction (Hazelight Studios/Electronic Arts)

=== Innovation Award ===
- Blue Prince (Dogubomb/Raw Fury)
  - Ball x Pit (Kenny Sun/Devolver Digital)
  - Baby Steps (Gabe Cuzzillo, Maxi Boch, Bennett Foddy/Devolver Digital)
  - Clair Obscur: Expedition 33 (Sandfall Interactive/Kepler Interactive)
  - Donkey Kong Bananza (Nintendo EDP/Nintendo)

=== Best Narrative ===
- Clair Obscur: Expedition 33 (Sandfall Interactive/Kepler Interactive)
  - Despelote (Julián Cordero, Sebastián Valbuena/Panic)
  - Dispatch (AdHoc Studio)
  - Ghost of Yōtei (Sucker Punch Productions/Sony Interactive Entertainment)
  - Split Fiction (Hazelight Studios/Electronic Arts)

=== Best Technology ===
- Death Stranding 2: On the Beach (Kojima Productions/Sony Interactive Entertainment)
  - Clair Obscur: Expedition 33 (Sandfall Interactive/Kepler Interactive)
  - Donkey Kong Bananza (Nintendo EDP/Nintendo)
  - Ghost of Yōtei (Sucker Punch Productions/Sony Interactive Entertainment)
  - Split Fiction (Hazelight Studios/Electronic Arts)

=== Best Visual Art ===
- Clair Obscur: Expedition 33 (Sandfall Interactive/Kepler Interactive)
  - Absolum (Guard Crush Games, Supamonks/Dotemu)
  - Death Stranding 2: On the Beach (Kojima Productions/Sony Interactive Entertainment)
  - Ghost of Yōtei (Sucker Punch Productions/Sony Interactive Entertainment)
  - Hades II (Supergiant Games)
  - Keeper (Double Fine/Xbox Game Studios)

=== Social Impact ===
- Consume Me (Jenny Jiao Hsia, AP Thomson/Hexacutable)
  - And Roger (TearyHand Studio/Kodansha)
  - Despelote (Julián Cordero, Sebastián Valbuena/Panic)
  - Dispatch (AdHoc Studio)

=== Audience Award ===
- And Roger (TearyHand Studio/Kodansha)

=== Lifetime Achievement Award ===
- Don Daglow

=== Ambassador Award ===
- Rebecca Ann Heineman
