= And Roger =

2025 video game

- Developer: TearyHand Studio
- Publisher: Kodansha
- Engine: Unity
- Platforms: Windows; macOS; Nintendo Switch; Android; iOS; Nintendo Switch 2
- Release: Windows, macOS, Nintendo Switch; 23 July 2025; Android, iOS, Nintendo Switch 2; June 18, 2026
- Genre: Adventure
- Mode: Single-player

And Roger (stylised as and Roger) is a 2025 video game developed by TearyHand Studio and published by Kodansha. The game is a visual novel in which players complete basic household tasks through interactive gameplay and puzzles. Players assume the role of Sofia, who first appears as a girl struggling with delusions affecting her reality, and later as a woman experiencing dementia.

Upon release, And Roger received favorable reviews from critics, with praise directed to the impact of the narrative and the effect of the gameplay mechanics to convey the emotional state of the characters, with some criticism at the intuitiveness of those mechanics. Following release, the game received several awards at the Tokyo Games Show Sense of Wonder Night, including the Audience Award Grand Prix.

== Gameplay ==
Players use point and click interaction to complete puzzles around basic tasks, such as brushing teeth.

Gameplay consists of progressing the narrative through text and interactive elements through point and click controls. The player completes interactive tasks, often simple household activities such as washing hands or brushing teeth, by pressing unmarked buttons on the screen. To complete some tasks, players must complete the button in the correct sequence. Later sequences involve other interactions, including puzzle sequences where players trace patterns or lines over visuals to progress.

== Plot ==
Players assume the role of a woman named Sofia, who appears as a young girl, an adult, and an older woman throughout the narrative. As a young girl, Sofia wakes and prepares for school, only to find a stranger sleeping on her couch. The stranger, who insists they have always lived in the house, helps her with household tasks, pressures her to eat, cleans up after her, and urges her to take her medicine. Sofia eventually escapes, running down the street in the darkness to a bakery.

In a flashback scene in the form of a young woman, players see Sofia meet a man named Roger working at the same bakery, begin a relationship with him, and eventually marry him. The couple struggles as Sofia finds it increasingly difficult to complete basic household tasks and becomes distressed by her reflection, which shifts between child and adult states. It is revealed that Sofia's delusions are a result of dementia. Sofia's husband Roger and the stranger in the house are revealed as the same person, shown through juxtaposed scenes of the stranger tearfully praying that he could reach her and Roger admitting that he had hit her in the past so she would take her medicine.

At the end of the game, Sofia is institutionalized and visited by her husband, who admits he has made mistakes in their relationship, reaffirms his wedding vows to her, and urges her to "wait a bit longer" before she can come home. The game concludes with a biblical quote from 1 Corinthians 13:13: "And now these three remain: faith, hope and love. But the greatest of these is love."

== Development and release ==
And Roger is the project of Japanese independent developer Yona. Yona aimed to create a game that was more than a visual novel, using interactive elements to "express the protagonist's situation, the setting, and emotions not through words, but through gameplay itself". The game's art was created in Adobe Illustrator, with Yona aiming to create a "simple ... but super cute" visual style by conveying characters through minimalist lines and expressions. And Roger was published by the Game Creators Lab, a game publishing department of Japanese company Kodansha, who provided feedback on the demo. The game was released on 23 July 2025. Ports for Android, iOS, and Nintendo Switch 2 released on June 18, 2026.

== Reception ==
Reception

Review scores
Publication	Score
Game Informer	8.5/10
Nintendo World Report	9.5/10

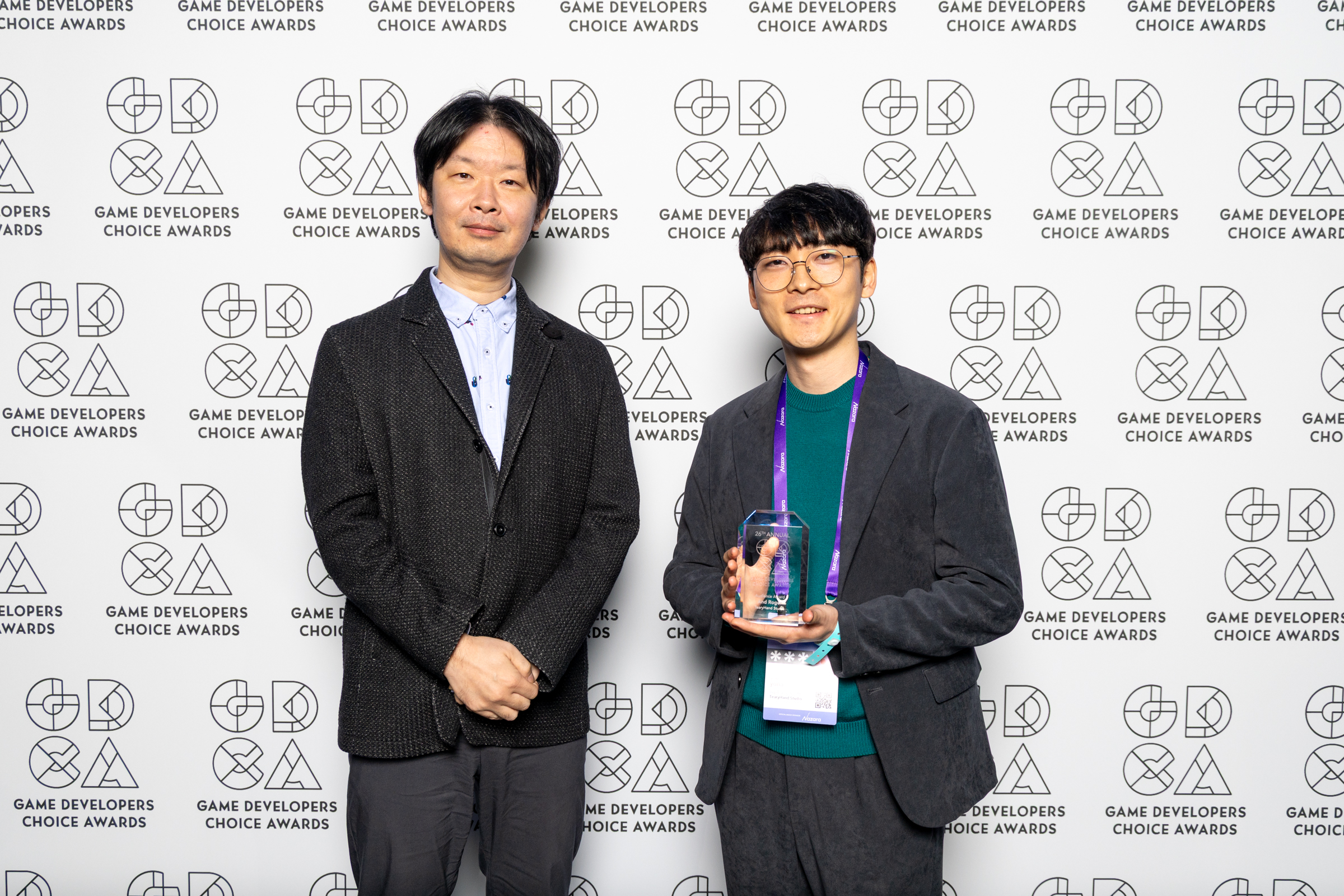
Yona holding the Audience Award he won at the 26th Game Developers Choice Awards. The game's composer, Yasuhiro Nakashima, stands on the left.

Upon release, critics praised And Roger for its narrative and emotional impact. Commending the game as a "strong example of video games' strength as a storytelling medium" Marcus Stewart of Game Informer praised the "novel and playful ways" that the game used to convey emotion and hardship, which "strengthened [his] personal connection and empathy" for the game's characters. Describing the game as "walking the tightrope between some of the darkest subject matter [and] toying with the expectations of the player, and yet still showcasing the warmth and love of human connections", Willem Hilhorst of Nintendo World Report similarly considered the mechanics "elevate the entire experience in a way that is rarely seen in games". Riley Macleod of Aftermath commended the game's "nuanced" representation of cognitive decline, praising the game for being a "gentle and moving exploration of what it's like to care for a declining loved one", but also not downplaying the "hard parts" of this process. Several critics compared it to Florence, a title with a similar art style and gameplay mechanics. Some critics stated the gameplay could be cumbersome or confusing at first, although felt this was intentional. Kenneth Shepard of Kotaku stated the game was "clunky" and encountered "frustration and friction", but found this complemented the game's narrative. Similarly, Macleod said the minigames felt "confusing and frustrating" to play, but considered these were an "evocative way to portray her distress, once the game's real subject matter becomes clear".

=== Accolades ===
And Roger received the Audience Award Grand Prix, Best Arts Award, and the Best Presentation Award at the Tokyo Games Show Sense of Wonder Night in September 2025, an event to recognise experimental and creative games. It was also nominated for Game Beyond Entertainment at the 22nd British Academy Games Awards. At the 26th Game Developers Choice Awards, it received the Audience Award and was nominated for the Social Impact award.
