= Ball x Pit =

2025 video game

- Developer: Kenny Sun
- Publisher: Devolver Digital
- Director: Kenny Sun
- Designer: Kenny Sun
- Programmer: Kenny Sun
- Composer: Amos Roddy
- Engine: Unity
- Platforms: macOS; Nintendo Switch; PlayStation 5; Windows; Xbox Series X/S; Nintendo Switch 2; iOS; Android
- Release: macOS, Nintendo Switch, PlayStation 5, Windows, Xbox Series X/S; October 15, 2025; Nintendo Switch 2; October 28, 2025; iOS, Android; March 12, 2026
- Mode: Single-player

Ball x Pit is a roguelike video game developed by Kenny Sun and published by Devolver Digital. It was released on macOS, Nintendo Switch, PlayStation 5, Windows and Xbox Series X/S in October 2025, with a Nintendo Switch 2 version released later that month. The game combines two separate gameplay loops, an Arkanoid-inspired action stage where the player defeats monsters by bouncing balls against them, and a city builder stage where resources collected can be used to improve buildings that grant new characters and abilities in the action stage.

== Gameplay ==
Ball x Pit takes place in the ruins of Ballbylon after the city was destroyed by a meteor, leaving a giant pit. Adventurers come to the ruins to seek riches of the former city but must face hordes of monsters that lurk in the pit. Game Informer describes it as a game that combines roguelike, bullet hell and town-building simulation genres.

The game has two separate stages. The first stage is inspired by block breaker games like Arkanoid. In this stage, the player controls one of several adventurers, launching various balls at enemy forces that march slowly towards them; if any monster reaches the bottom of the field, they will damage the adventurer, and the run will be over if the adventurer takes too much damage. Each adventurer starts with a certain inventory of balls, some which can inflict special damage to the monsters. Similar to Vampire Survivors, collecting gems dropped by the monsters levels up the adventurer, giving them the choice to add new balls, leveling up existing balls, or receiving passive items that affect the gameplay loop. At times, monsters will drop a special item that can be fissioned to drop several powerups, or used to fuse two existing balls into one with the effects of both, or evolve balls into a more powerful version. Each run is broken into multiple segments; the early segments end with a mini-boss fight while the final stage is against a powerful boss character.

After either completing a run or losing all health, the adventurer returns to the surface to work on expanding a small village adjacent to the elevator that takes them into the pit. Using gold, blueprints, and material resources like wood and stone collected during the action stage, the player can build resource spaces or start the construction of buildings which can bring in additional adventurer characters or improve the attributes of all characters at the start of the action stage. The player can also expand the size of the village or upgrade existing structures with gold. To complete most of these actions or to collect resources, the player can assign workers to these spaces. The workers can collect resources or advance construction of buildings. Over multiple runs, the player can also gain gears from boss fights that allow the pit elevator to reach different levels with new monsters and bosses to defeat.

== Development ==
Lead developer Kenny Sun said he was inspired by Punball, a ball-breakout mobile game he had found around November 2021 that included roguelike elements. While he enjoyed the game, he felt there were several elements he could improve on, and after a few weeks, started work on his own game. As he expanded on his ideas, elements like introducing multiple adventures and the city-building supported the meta-progression between runs and keep the game interesting over multiple runs.

On January 26, 2026, the game's first update, the Regal Update was released. The update features two new characters (The Falconer and The Carouser), eight new special balls and three passive abilities. The update also features an endless mode and is the first of three planned updates for 2026.

On April 27, 2026, the second update, the Shadow Update was released. The update features an additional two new characters (The Tunneller and The Tiptoer), eleven new special balls and four new passive abilities. The update also adds an option to re-roll past upgrades.

An iOS and Android port of the game was released on March 12, 2026.

An expansion, Risen Ballbaylon, is scheduled for release on November 12, 2026. The expansion adds new characters, balls, building, and biomes.

== Reception ==
Reception

Aggregate scores
Aggregator	Score
Metacritic	PS5: 88/100; NS: 89/100; PC: 84/100
OpenCritic	92% recommend

Review scores
Publication	Score
Eurogamer	4/5
Game Informer	8.75/10
PC Gamer (US)	80/100

Ball x Pit received "generally favorable" reviews on multiple platforms according to the review aggregation website Metacritic. Fellow review aggregator OpenCritic assessed that the game received "mighty" approval, being recommended by 92% of critics. The newly released iOS and Android version also received positive reviews.

=== Sales ===
The game sold more than 300,000 units across all platforms in its first five days.

In December 2025, the game surpassed 1 million copies sold worldwide. Following this success, the developers announced plans to support the game with three free content updates scheduled for release throughout 2026.

=== Accolades ===
Year	Award	Category	Result	Ref.
2025	The Game Awards 2025	Best Independent Game	Nominated	
2026	15th New York Game Awards	Excelsior Award for Best New York Game	Won	
2026	Ultra Game Awards 2025	Surprise of the Year (Independent Game)	Nominated	
2026	Ultra Game Awards 2025	Best Innovation (Independent Game)	Won	
2026	Ultra Game Awards 2025	Independent Game of the Year (Players' Voice)	Nominated	
2026	26th Game Developers Choice Awards	Best Debut	Nominated	
2026	26th Game Developers Choice Awards	Best Design	Nominated	
2026	26th Game Developers Choice Awards	Innovation Award	Nominated	
2026	28th Independent Games Festival Awards	Seumas McNally Grand Prize	Honorable mention	
2026	28th Independent Games Festival Awards	Excellence in Audio	Nominated	
2026	22nd British Academy Games Awards	Game Design	Nominated	
2026	22nd British Academy Games Awards	New Intellectual Property	Longlisted	
