= Tiny Bookshop =

2025 video game

- Developer: Neoludic Games
- Publisher: Skystone Games
- Platforms: Windows; Mac; Linux; Nintendo Switch, Xbox Series X and Series S; Android
- Release: August 7, 2025
- Genre: Casual game; role-playing video game; simulation
- Mode: Single-player

Tiny Bookshop is a shopkeeping simulation video game developed by Neoludic Games and published by Skystone Games. It is set in a fictional seaside town where the player manages a mobile bookshop. It was released on August 7, 2025 for Windows, Mac, Linux, and Nintendo Switch. It was later released on the Xbox Series X and S and became available on Xbox Game Pass on Day 1.

== Gameplay ==
In Tiny Bookshop, the player assumes the role of a bookseller running a mobile bookshop in the fictional seaside town of Bookstonbury. The game allows players to design and decorate their trailer-turned-bookshop, sell and recommend real-world books to customers, make friends with locals, discover new locations, and complete missions around town.

Each day the player selects a location to take their mobile bookshop in Bookstonbury. Then the player selects how many of each of the seven book genres they want to stock, up to the limit allowed by the bookshelves equipped in their shop. After starting their day, the player opens their shop and waits for customers to browse their books. Some non-player characters are regulars and the player can befriend them through missions.

While selling a number of customers request help from the player to recommend a book from the shop that meets the criteria they want to read. These requests vary in difficulty, and the player can browse the specific titles currently populating the shelves to select a book to recommend or tell the customer they don't have a book that fits their needs. As the player browses available books, they see the title, author, publication date, number of pages, and a short description to help them determine what the book is. Most of these are real books, and some of them are fictional.

== Development ==
Tiny Bookshop was developed by Neoludic Games, a small developer based in Cologne, Germany.

In May 2026, the studio announced they were working on downloadable content (DLC) to extend the story of the original game.

== Reception ==
Reception

Aggregate scores
Aggregator	Score
Metacritic	81/100
OpenCritic	84% recommend (Note: Based on 50 reviews)

Review score
Publication	Score
Nintendo Life	8/10

Tiny Bookshop received largely positive reviews, and was praised by critics for its relaxing gameplay and cozy atmosphere.

=== Awards ===
Tiny Bookshop won Most Charming Game at the Indie Cup Germany 2022 festival and the Ubisoft Newcomer Award at the German Developer Award in 2023. At Gamescom 2025, it won the Games for Impact award and was nominated for Most Wholesome.
