= Outside Xbox =

British YouTube group

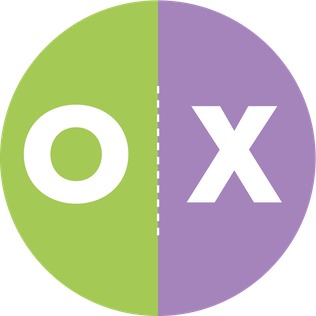
- Other names: Oxboxtra; OxBox; Oxtra
- Occupations: YouTubers; Journalists

YouTube information
- Channels: outsidexbox; Outside Xtra
- Years active: 2012–present
- Genres: Commentary; Entertainment; Journalism; Gaming; Vlog
- Subscribers: 2.68 million (outsidexbox); 1.04 million (Outside Xtra)
- Views: 1.49 billion (outsidexbox); 443 million (Outside Xtra)
- Last updated: 22 October 2025
- Website: www.outsidexbox.com; www.outsidextra.com

Outside Xbox, or Oxbox, is a British YouTube channel and group consisting of Jane Douglas, Andy Farrant and Mike Channell. The group also has a sister channel, Outside Xtra, or Oxtra, consisting of Ellen Rose. The group is best known for video games commentary, journalism, and gameplay. The channel also hosts the Oxventure, a real-play tabletop role-playing game series primarily encompassing Dungeons & Dragons but occasionally others such as Blades in the Dark and Deadlands, featuring fellow YouTubers Johnny Chiodini and Luke Westaway, and which was later launched as its own channel. The group has over 3.8 million subscribers (combined) and over 1.9 billion views across all three channels as of July 2025.

== Members ==
The following people are part of OutsideXbox and its associated channels:

Editors:

- Andy Farrant – OutsideXbox (2012–present)
- Jane Douglas – OutsideXbox (2012–present)
- Mike Channell – OutsideXbox (2012–present)
- Ellen Rose – Outside Xtra (2016–present)
- Luke Westaway – Outside Xtra (2016–2024)

Producers:

- James Hills – video producer
- Jon Garnham – video producer
- Zack Fortais-Gomm – producer (Oxventure)

Series regulars:

- Johnny Chiodini – Dungeon Master and role-player (2017–present)
- Luke Westaway – role-player (2024–present)

== History ==
OutsideXbox was launched in 2012 by the then EuroGamer Network (now Gamer Network) as a website focused on Xbox gaming and its community. The founding members all had previous games journalism experience: Andy Farrant was part of Inside Xbox in Europe; Jane Douglas was working with GameSpot; and Mike Channell previously worked for the magazine PC Format and was the UK deputy editor of the Official Xbox Magazine. The group expanded in 2016 to include a second channel, Outside Xtra, to cover the wider games industry beyond Xbox. New members included Luke Westaway, previously a CNET senior editor and contributor to Nintendo Life; and Ellen Rose, who worked for Attention Seekers' official Xbox channel Xbox On.

Outside Xbox reached one million subscribers in July 2015.

In February 2018, OutsideXbox and the rest of the Gamer Network, was acquired by ReedPOP, a subsidiary of RELX Group. In 2019, Douglas was named as one of the 100 Most Influential Women in the UK games industry for her work at OutsideXbox.

On 24 June 2021, Hitman 3 released featured contracts on the Dartmoor map curated by Farrant, Douglas and Channell focused on stealth, poison and explosions. This was part of the game's Season 3 Seven Deadly Sins DLC content, specifically Act 3: Season of Sloth.

Douglas made cameo appearances as a Sixer in Ready Player One and a scientist in Jurassic World: Dominion.

Outside Xtra reached one million subscribers in June 2023. Westaway announced his departure from the channel on 10 April 2024, with his final video airing on 3 May, though he continues to appear regularly on the Oxventure channel. The Gamer Network was acquired by IGN, a subsidiary of Ziff Davis, in May 2024.

== Oxventure ==
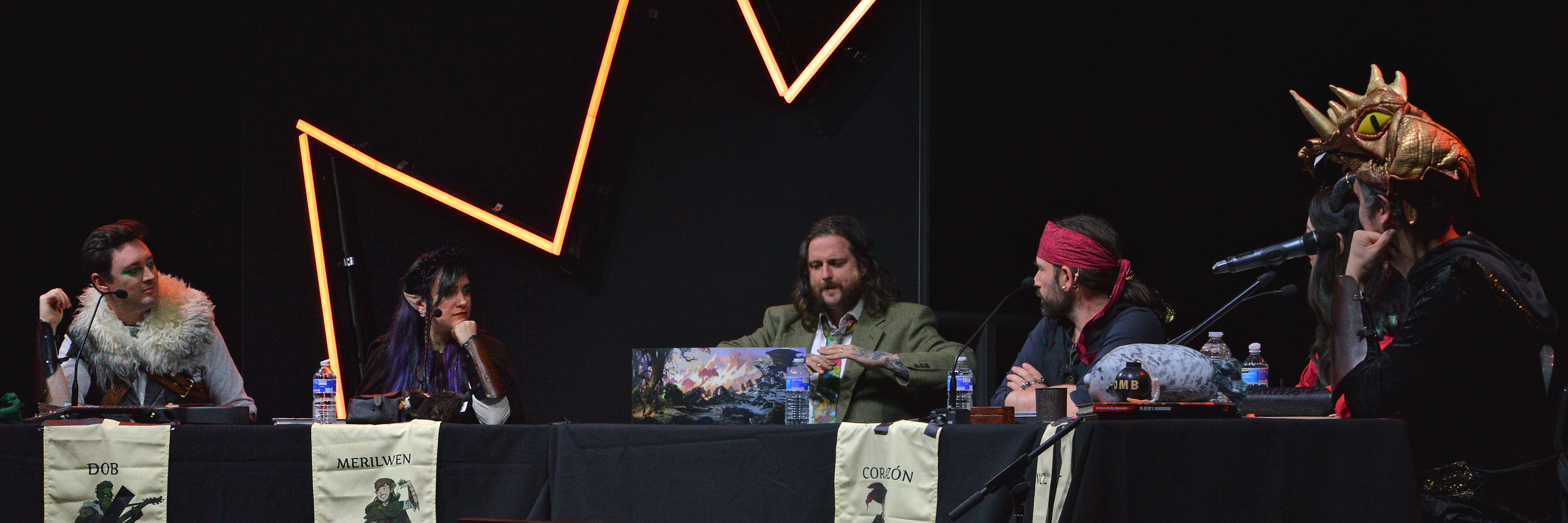
The Oxventurers Guild at MCM London Comic Con October 2023

Both OutsideXbox channels began the Oxventure Dungeons & Dragons campaign in 2017, with Johnny Chiodini as Dungeon Master. The Oxventure began a podcast in August 2020 hosted by Jane Douglas to replay old D&D sessions and chat with other members of OutsideXbox. At New York Comic Con x MCM Metaverse 2020, the Oxventure did three virtual sessions of the TTRPG Lasers & Feelings on 14 August 2020, 10 October 2020 and 11 June 2021. On 8 January 2021, the Oxventure began a Blades in the Dark series, DM'd by Westaway.

The Oxventure released a Dungeons & Dragons appreciation music video and single "Literally Everyone Else in the World" on 27 November 2019. It also had elements reflecting the upcoming Christmas holiday. The song's title is a reference to a Dungeon Master's role of being responsible for all NPC's in a fictional world, combined with DM Johnny Chiodini's introduction for themself to the audience. Luke Westaway and Andy Farrant wrote the single, with Farrant playing bass guitar for the track. Vocals were provided by all five Outside Xbox and Xtra editors, with CNET editor Andrew Hoyle on the drum. All proceeds from the single and its live-streamed premiere were donated to the UK mental health charity Mind.

In 2022, OutsideXbox advertised that it was looking to hire a new producer with the aim of developing its Oxventure brand, hiring Zack Fortais-Gomm and in September that year the Oxventure was relaunched under its own dedicated YouTube channel 'Oxventure', moving all previously uploaded Oxventure videos to it and beginning a new season titled Legacy of Dragons. While Dungeons & Dragons remains the focus of Oxventure, it has continued to expand its scope to other TTRPGs such as Deadlands which received a full series under the banner 'Oxventure Presents' in the summer of 2023, as well as a number of other games through their 'One Shot Wonder' series.

=== Dungeons & Dragons ===
==== The Oxventurer's Guild ====
The channel's flagship series featuring Johnny Chiodini as the Dungeon Master and the other members as the Oxventurers, premiered in September 2017. The final season, simply called "The Final Season", concluded in May 2024. In the series, Farrant plays as Corazón de Ballena, a rogueish pirate and arcane trickster with a cursed secret, Douglas portrays Prudence, a tiefling warlock serving Cthulhu who was abandoned by her parents, Rose plays as Merilwen, a wood elf druid with a love of animals and nature, Westaway plays as Dob, a half-orc bard initially searching for his long-lost sister, and Channell portrays Egbert the Careless, a dragonborn paladin who is seeking atonement for an unspecified crime.

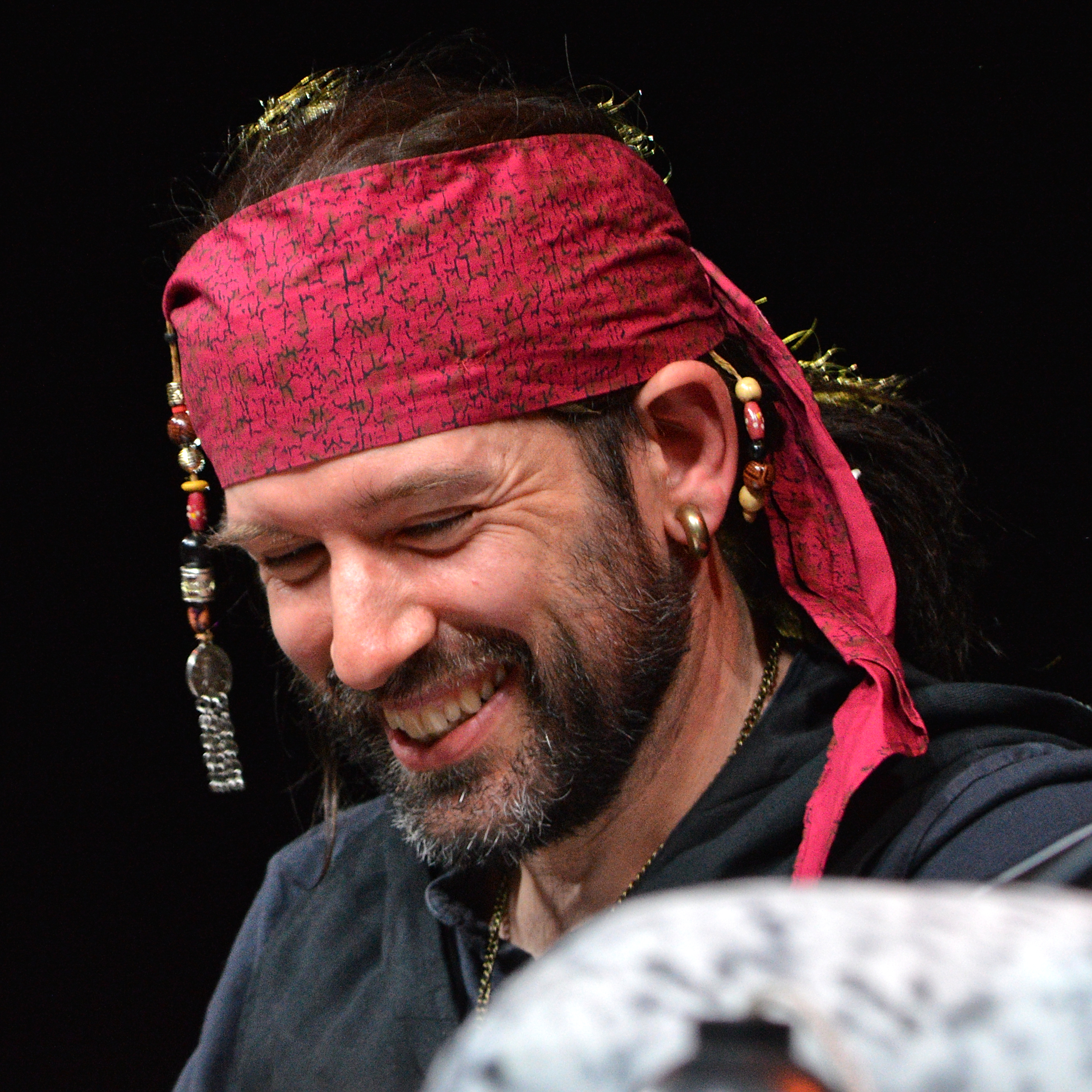
Andy Farrant as Corazón de Ballena, the Human Rogue Pirate

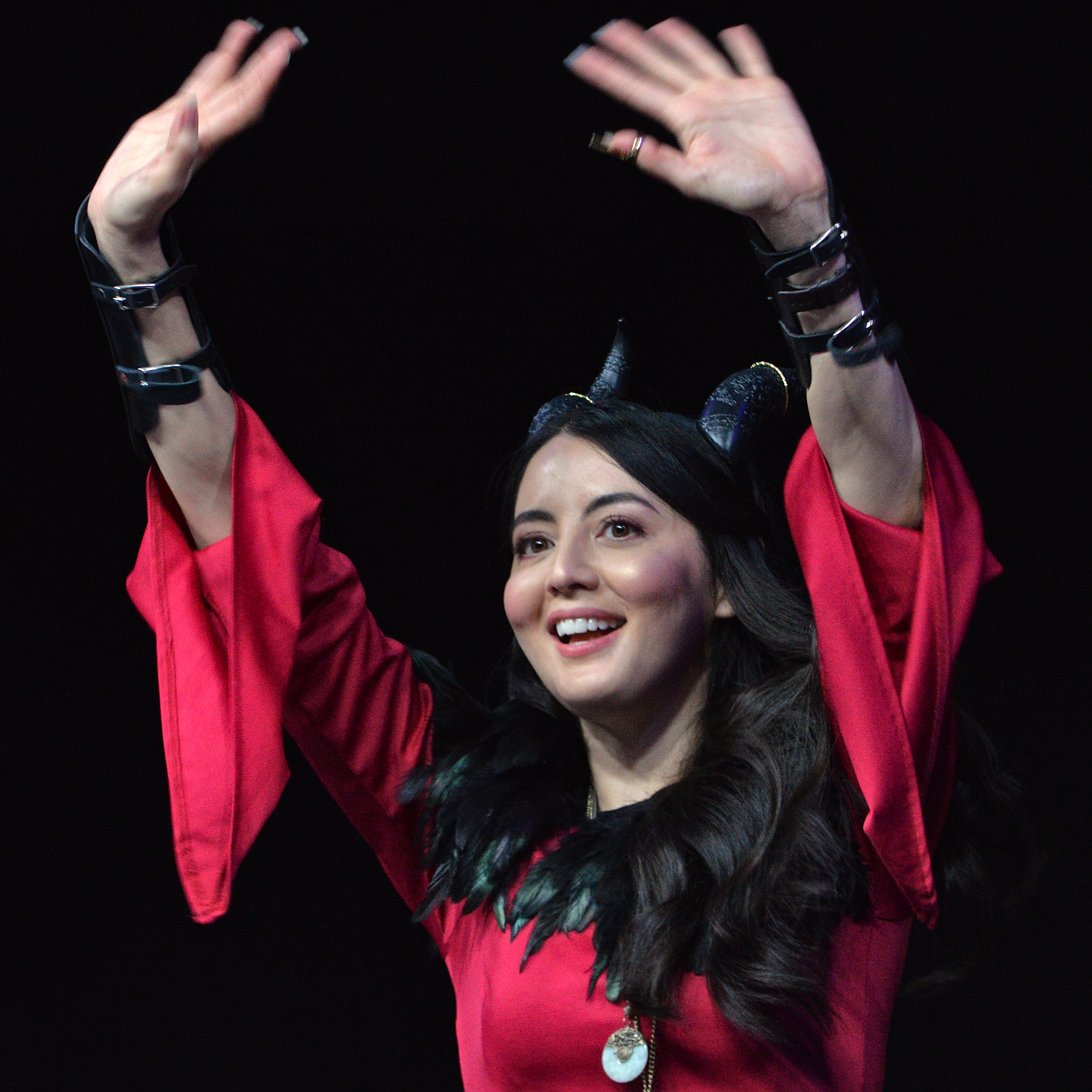
Jane Douglas as Prudence, the Tiefling Warlock

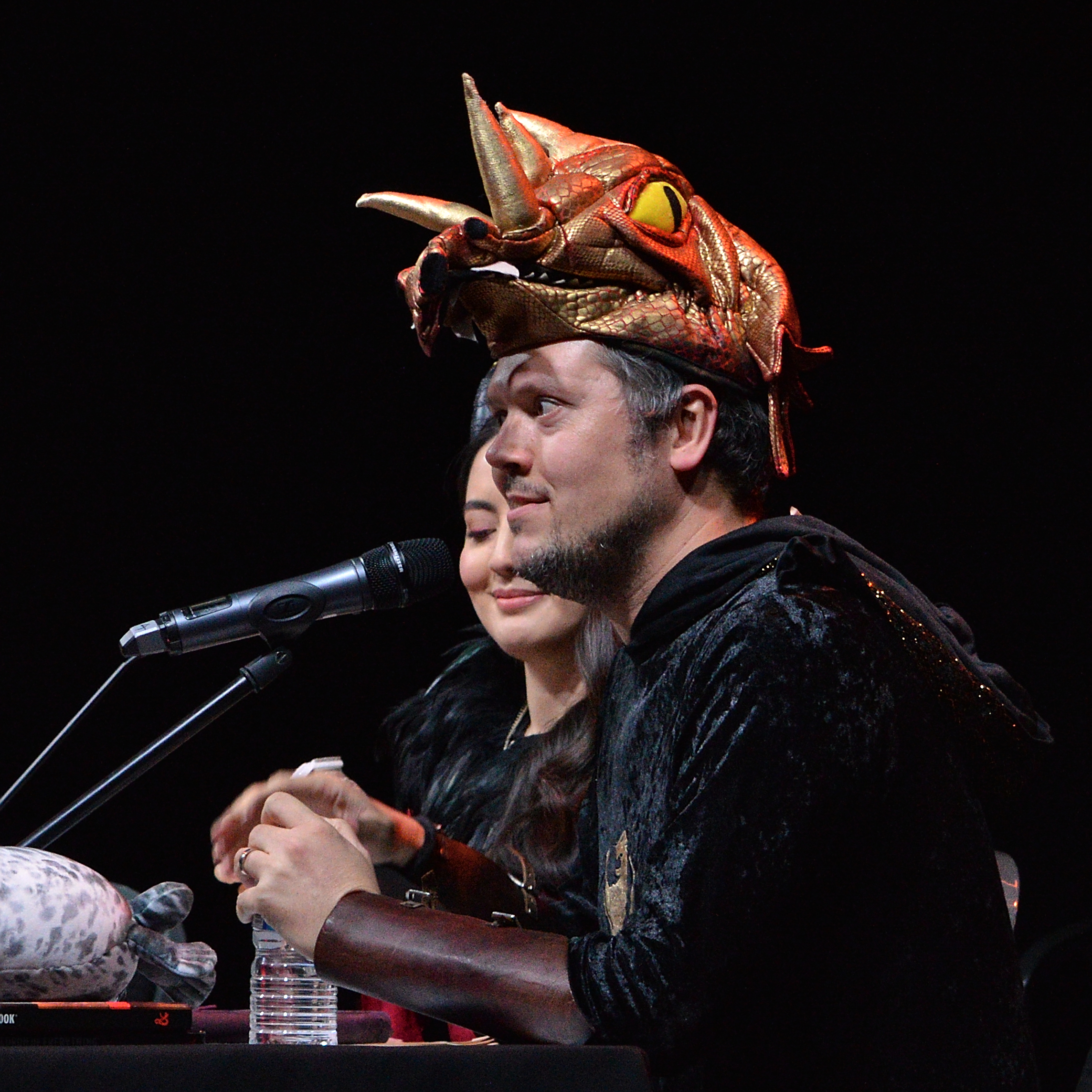
Mike Channell as Egbert, the Dragonborn Paladin

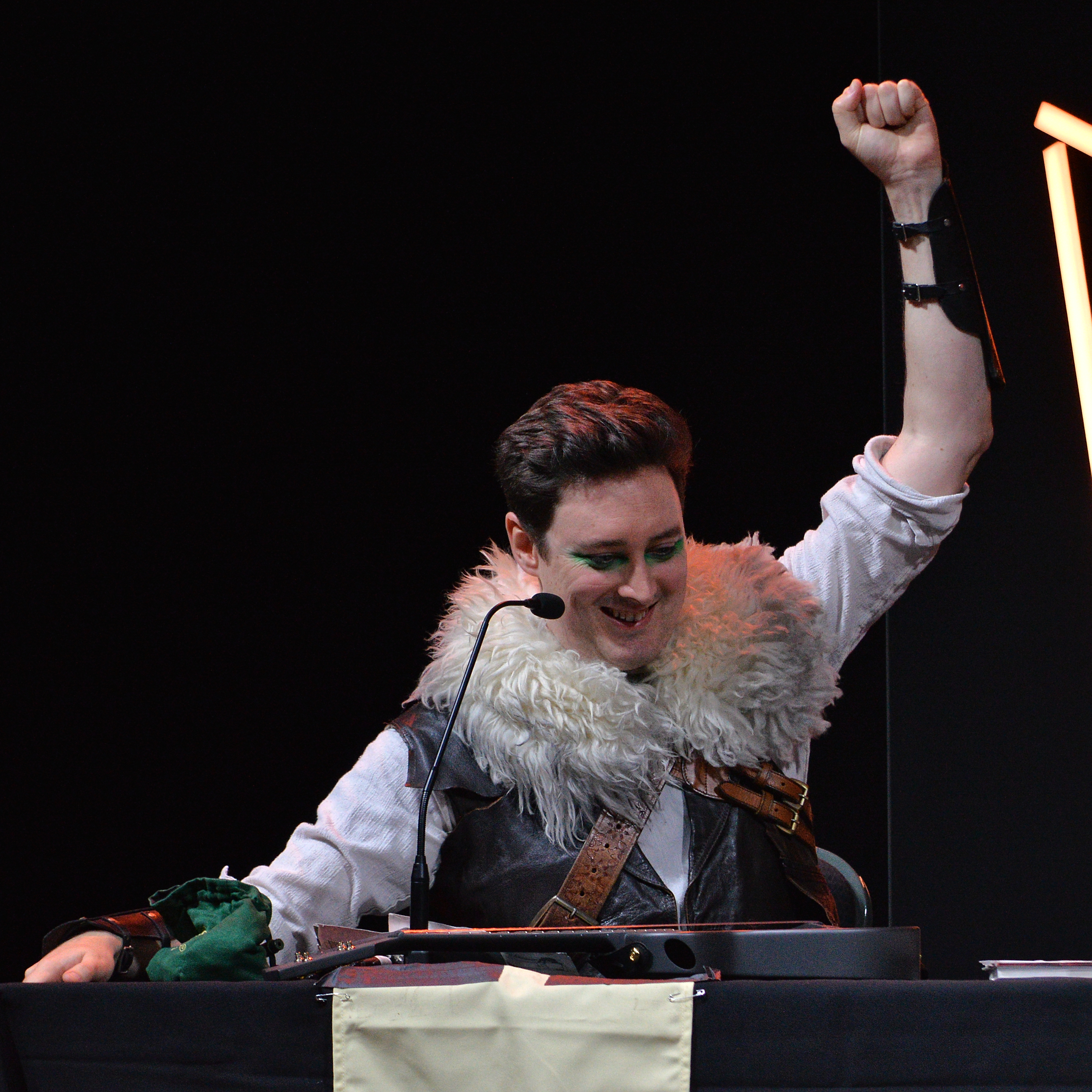
Luke Westaway as Dob, the Half-Orc Bard

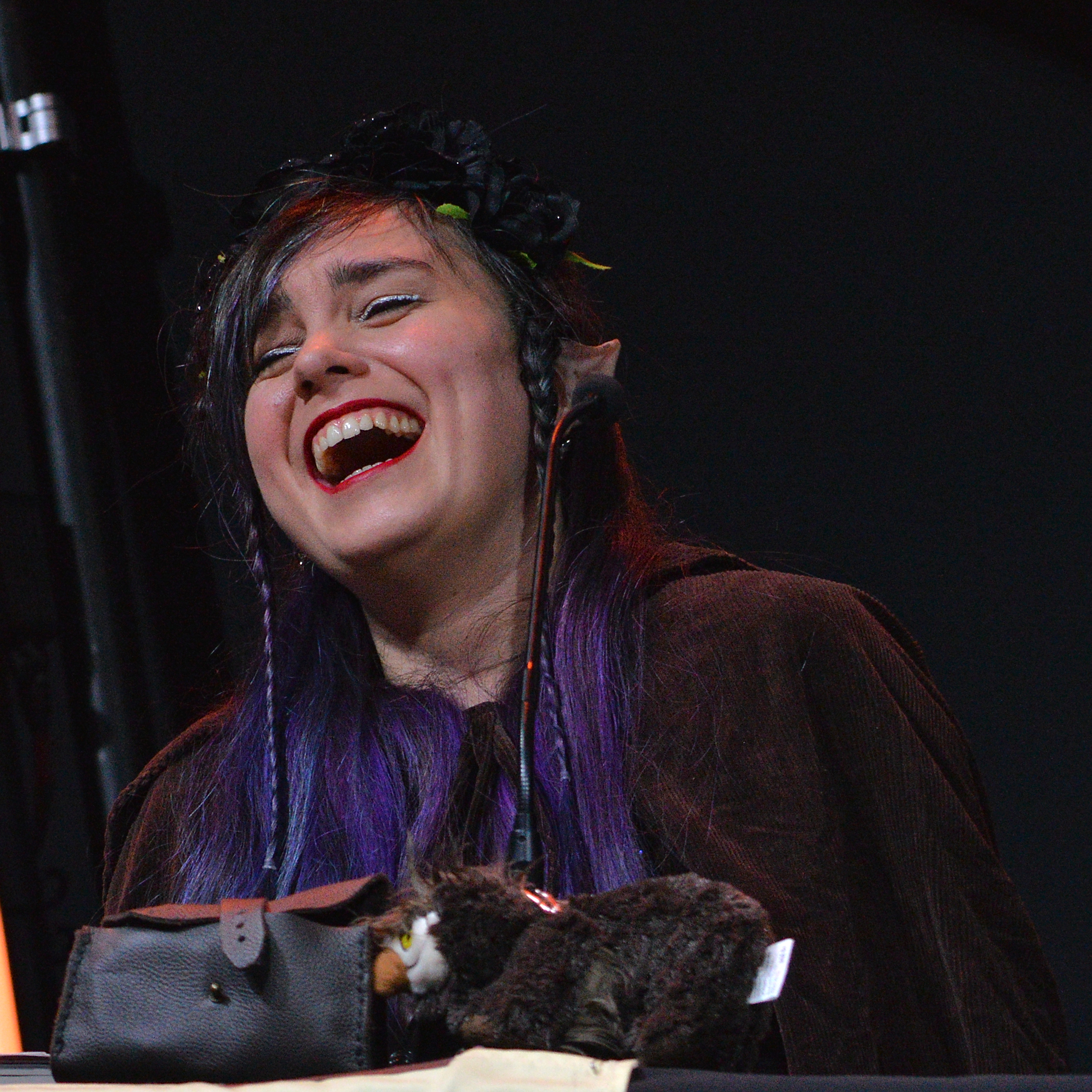
Ellen Rose as Merilwen, the Wood-Elf Druid

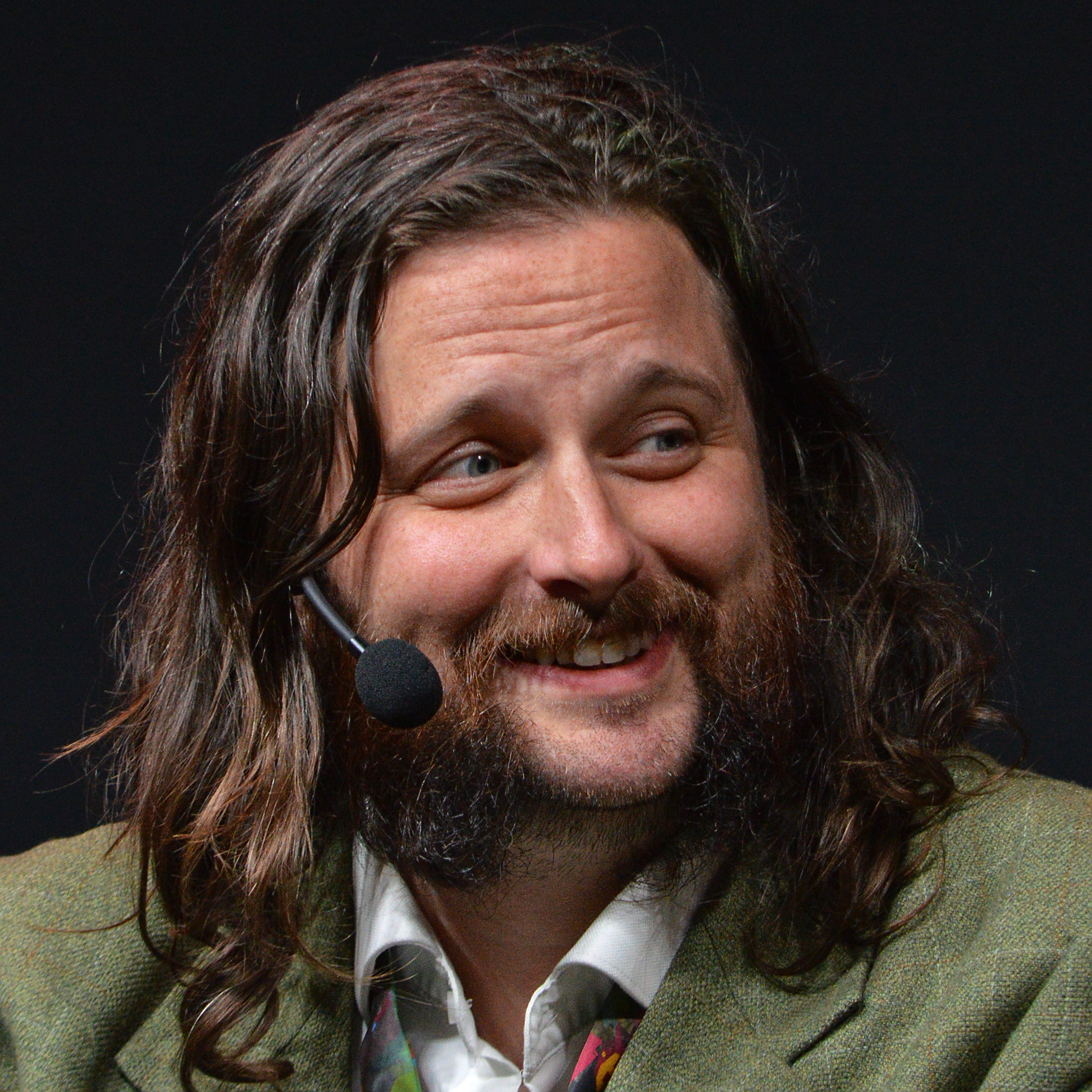
Johnny Chiodini, the Dungeon Master (Literally Everyone Else in the World)

Season One
Episode	Title	Original Release Date
1	The Spicy Rat Caper	8 September 2017
2	The Spicy Rat Caper	15 September 2017
3	The Spicy Rat Caper	24 September 2017
4	Spot of Bother	29 December 2017
5	Spot of Bother	5 January 2018
6	Spot of Bother	12 January 2018
7	Wild Wild Woods	14 February 2017
8	Wild Wild Woods	14 February 2017
9	An Orcward Encounter	23 April 2018
10	An Orcward Encounter	25 April 2018
11	Quiet Riot	18 September 2018
12	Quiet Riot	18 September 2018
13	Plunder Siege	15 October 2018
14	Plunder Siege	15 October 2018
15	A Fishmas Carol	27 December 2018
16	A Fishmas Carol	27 December 2018
17	A Fishmas Carol	28 December 2018
18	A Fishmas Carol	28 December 2018
19	Bad Chair Day	2 April 2019
20	Brawl of the Wild	3 April 2019
21	Heist Society	8 April 2019
22	Stop Hammer Time	15 April 2019
23	Spell Check	19 June 2019

Season Two
Episode	Title	Original Release Date
—N/a	The Levelling	7 August 2019
1	Out of Order	14 August 2019
2	Out of Order	21 August 2019
3	Out of Order	28 August 2019
4	Ship Happens	1 November 2019
5	Mind Your Manors	8 November 2019
6	Rolling in the Deep	26 November 2019
7	Peak Performance	30 December 2019
8	Peak Performance	31 December 2019
9	Peak Performance	1 January 2020
10	Peak Performance	2 January 2020
11	Exhibition Impossible	13 March 2020
12	Exhibition Impossible	20 March 2020
13	Exhibition Impossible	27 March 2020
14	Faire Trial	3 April 2020
15	Sect Appeal	17 April 2020
16	The Corn Ultimatum	1 May 2020
17	Hunter Pressure	15 May 2020
—N/a	Levelling Up Special	22 May 2020
18	Elf Hazard	29 May 2020
19	Bone to Pick	19 June 2020
20	Bone to Pick	3 July 2020
21	Tower Rangers	17 July 2020
22	Watch Out!	31 July 2020
23	Gnome Alone	28 August 2020
24	Fast and Furriest	16 September 2020
25	Snow Mercy	2 October 2020
26	Mule Be Sorry	9 October 2020
27	Unreal Estate	16 September 2020
28	Unreal Estate	31 October 2020
29	Court in the Act	13 November 2020
30	Heir Superiority	30 November 2020
31	Silent Knight	28 December 2020
32	Silent Knight	29 December 2020
33	Chart of Darkness	15 January 2021
34	Sail of the Century	29 January 2021
35	Sail of the Century	30 January 2021
36	Brine and Punishment	12 February 2021
37	Brine and Punishment	13 February 2021
38	High Moon	26 February 2021
39	High Moon	27 February 2021
40	Crawl Me Maybe	12 March 2021
41	Crawl Me Maybe	13 March 2021

Season Three - The Orbpocalypse Saga
Episode	Title	Original Release Date
—N/a	Season One + Two Recap	22 March 2021
—N/a	The Levelling	19 May 2021
1	Sphere We Go	23 May 2021
2	Epic Jail	30 May 2021
3	Escaped Crusaders	6 June 2021
4	Wrangle in the Tangle	13 June 2021
5	Twin it to Win it	20 June 2021
6	Monky Business	27 June 2021
7	Party Fowl	4 July 2021
8	No Way Rosé	11 July 2021
9	Fools of Engagement	18 July 2021
10	Plandemonium	25 July 2021
11	Dine Hard	1 August 2021
12	Season Finale	8 August 2021

2021-2022 Specials
Title	Original Release Date
A Fête Worse Than Death	31 October 2021
Tome Sweet Tome	7 November 2021
Wedded Redemption	14 November 2021
Let's Get Fiscal	5 December 2021
Hog Wild	27 December 2021
Hog Wild	28 December 2021
Battle for Bardcon	9 March 2022
Big Deck Energy	10 June 2022
Bride or Die	17 June 2022

Season Four - Legacy of Dragons
Episode	Title	Original Release Date
1	Shell Shock	30 September 2022
2	Record Time	7 October 2022
3	Bad Altitude	14 October 2022
4	Carpe Idiom	21 October 2022
5	Parley Hard	11 November 2022
6	Mean Gulls	18 November 2022
7	Mist Opportunity	25 November 2022
8	Ballot Time	2 December 2022
9	Ready Lair One	9 December 2022
10	Corpse and Robbers	16 December 2022

2022-2023 Specials
Title	Original Release Date
Snow Escape	30 December 2022
Knight Shift	6 January 2023
Grad Attitude	13 January 2023
Baking Bad	20 January 2023

Season Five - Extinction
Episode	Title	Original Release Date
1	Paddle Royale	24 February 2023
2	Life Finds a Dob	3 March 2023
3	Centaur of Attention	10 March 2023
4	Hag Reflex	17 March 2023
5	Below the Pelt	24 March 2023
6	In Dino Veritas	31 March 2023
7	Cursed Case Scenario	14 April 2023
8	Cavern a Bad Day	21 April 2023
9	Staff Wars	28 April 2023

2023-2024 Specials
Title	Original Release Date
Play Fight	7 April 2023
Squid Pro Quo	23 June 2023
Halloween Special	31 October 2023
Clear & Present Danger	22 December 2023
Battle Royale	15 March 2024

Season Six - The Final Season
Episode	Title	Original Release Date
1	Frenemy at the Gates	12 April 2024
2	Elf-Fulfilling Prophecy	19 April 2024
3	Fails from the Crypt	26 April 2024
4	Eldritch or Die Trying	3 May 2024
5	Prism Break	10 May 2024
6	Portal Combat	17 May 2024

==== Wyrdwood ====
Following the conclusion of the flagship Dungeons & Dragons series, Oxventure launched Wyrdwood, a new campaign created by Chiodini based on British folklore and folk horror media. The first season debuted on 13 September 2024 and concluded on 1 November 2024. The second season ran from July 11 to August 29, 2025. In the series, Rose plays as Cressida Blackwater, a snobbish and shrewd banker and human/elf wizard, Westaway plays Happen, a human ranger who belongs to a cult that worships Cadence the Goddess of Luck, Channell plays as Lug, a kind and knowledgeable firbolg barbarian, Douglas plays Willowfine, an aasimar cleric and healer, and Farrant plays the dual roles of Robin Oatcake, a young and unremarkable human commoner, and Morven Hellwain, an impatient and powerful aberrant sorcerer who possesses Robin's body and takes control whenever he is asleep or knocked unconscious.

Season One
Chapter	Title	Original Release Date
1	Folkmoot	13 September 2024
2	Rootbound	20 September 2024
3	Howls in the Night	27 September 2024
4	The Path of Broken Oaths	4 October 2024
5	Ironclad	11 October 2024
6	Shapes in the Mist	18 October 2024
7	Friends & Falsehoods	4 October 2024
8	Friends & Falsehoods	1 November 2024

Season Two
Episode	Title	Original Release Date
1	Mossfold	11 July 2025
2	Homecoming	18 July 2025
3	Marsh & Malice	25 July 2025
4	The Fog	1 August 2025
5	Angler	8 August 2025
6	Robin's Gambit	15 August 2025
7	The Tower - Part 1	22 August 2025
8	The Tower - Part 2	29 August 2025

=== Blades in the Dark ===
The channel's Blades in the Dark campaign featured Luke Westaway as the Game Master and premiered in January 2021, ending in May and was followed by a Christmas special later in December. A second season began in July 2022 and concluded in September. Within the series, Channell plays as Barnaby Fortescue, a wealthy aristocrat, Farrant portrays Edvard Lumiere, a brilliant inventor, Chiodini plays as Kasimir Jones, a career criminal, Rose portrays Lilith Capellinaga, a scholar of ghosts and the supernatural, and Douglas plays Zillah Bruzaud, a former prize-fighter with a family to support.

Season One
Episode	Title	Original Release Date
Phase One
1	Dead Man's Debt	8 January 2021
2	Dead Man's Debt	9 January 2021
3	Ironhook's Bounty	22 January 2021
4	Ironhook's Bounty	23 January 2021
5	The Cab-Con Caper	5 February 2021
6	The Cab-Con Caper	6 February 2021
7	High Stakes at the Splintered Bone	19 February 2021
8	High Stakes at the Splintered Bone	20 February 2021
9	The Dreadful Dimmer Sisters	5 March 2021
10	The Dreadful Dimmer Sisters	6 March 2021
Phase Two
11	The Gut Cutter Bargain	19 March 2021
12	The Gut Cutter Bargain	20 March 2021
13	The Astor Gambit	2 April 2021
14	The Astor Gambit	3 April 2021
15	First Flight of the Sparrowhawk	16 April 2021
16	First Flight of the Sparrowhawk	17 April 2021
17	Murder at Volisport Academy	30 April 2021
18	Murder at Volisport Academy	1 May 2021
19	The Lampblack Wedding	14 May 2021
20	The Lampblack Wedding	15 May 2021
21	The Big Score	28 May 2021
22	The Big Score	29 May 2021
Christmas Special
23	A Crimsnight Carol	17 December 2021

Season Two
Episode	Title	Original Release Date
1	The Marriage of Lady Fyengeh	15 July 2022
2	The Death of Cornelius Bagshot	22 July 2022
3	To the Depths	29 July 2022
4	The Wardens of Bellweather Crematorium	5 August 2022
5	The Horrors of Castle Wisenshire	12 August 2022
6	Into the Deathlands	19 August 2022
7	The Fate of the Dimmer Sisters	26 August 2022
8	Foundry No. 12	2 September 2022
9	Magic, Ghosts, Danger & Death	9 September 2022

=== Deadlands ===
The channel's Deadlands campaign featured Andy Farrant as The Marshal and premiered in July 2023, concluding its first season in October. In the series, Douglas plays as Garnet Munro, a huckster card dealer turned demon hunter, Westaway portrays Delacy, a 13-year-old farmboy with a large, ornate gun named Rooster, Rose plays Edie Valentine, a saloon girl who works as a mercenary when money gets tight, Channel plays Silas Flint, a disillusioned lawman with a crippling fear of horses, and Chiodini portrays Nate Janssen, an elderly gravedigger traveling the rails. The first season focuses on the five "wild cards" coming together to answer a help wanted ad from a mysterious woman. The second season premiered on 21 March 2025.

Season One
Episode	Title	Original Release Date
1	Running Them Down	28 July 2023
2	Dead Man's Worth	4 August 2023
3	Dead Man's Worth	11 August 2023
4	Forty Times a Killer	18 August 2023
5	Forty Times a Killer	25 August 2023
6	The Town That Dreaded Justice	1 September 2023
7	The Town That Dreaded Justice	8 September 2023
8	More Wonders Than There Are in the Heavens	15 September 2023
9	More Wonders Than There Are in the Heavens	22 September 2023
10	Amat Victoria Curam	29 September 2023
—N/a	Season One Q&A	6 October 2023

Season Two
Episode	Title	Original Release Date
—N/a	Season One Recap/Season Two Preview	14 March 2025
1	The Beast of Bisley Bayou	21 March 2025

=== One Shots ===
These special episodes feature several guest players, including Josh Hayes, Jasper Cartwright, Liv Kennedy, Grant Howitt, Aoife Wilson, and Doug Cockle. Different episodes have different Game Masters; for brevity, they are listed alongside each episode.

Title	Game Master	Original Release Date
Dread	Luke Westaway	28 October 2022
You Awaken in a Strange Place	Johnny Chiodini	4 November 2022
Dragonlance: Shadow of the Dragon Queen	Johnny Chiodini	6 December 2022
Adventure Skeletons	Luke Westaway	27 January 2023
Teatime Adventures	Ellen Rose	8 March 2023
Blade Runner: The Roleplaying Game	Mike Channell	30 June 2023
D&D But... Everyone's a Kobold	Luke Westaway	8 March 2024
D&D But... Everyone Has Amnesia	Luke Westaway	22 March 2024
D&D But... Everyone Has Amnesia	Luke Westaway	29 March 2024
D&D But... It's Pokemon	Luke Westaway	21 June 2024
World Wide Wrestling RPG	Johnny Chiodini	5 July 2024
D&D But... Everyone's A Kobold LIVE!	Luke Westaway	19 July 2024
Discworld: Adventures in Ankh-Morpork	Andy Farrant	14 October 2024
D&D But... Everyone's Has Amnesia Again	Luke Westaway	29 November 2024
D&D But... Everyone's a Flumph!	Johnny Chiodini	6 December 2024
D&D But... It's Cluedo	Johnny Chiodini	20 December 2024
Alien: The Roleplaying Game	Mike Channell	25 March 2025

== Discography ==
Singles with year released
Title	Year
"Literally Everyone Else in the World"	2019
