= Moving Out 2 =

2023 cooperative moving simulation video game

- Developers: DevM Games; SMG Studio
- Publisher: Team17
- Producers: Caitlin Lomax; John Szoke
- Programmer: Stephen Woolcock
- Artist: Jack Kirby Crosby
- Writer: Scott Dettrick
- Composer: Brad Gentle
- Series: Moving Out
- Engine: Unity
- Platforms: Windows; Nintendo Switch; PlayStation 4; PlayStation 5; Xbox One; Xbox Series X/S
- Release: WW: August 15, 2023
- Genre: Simulation
- Modes: Single-player, multiplayer

Moving Out 2 is a 2023 cooperative simulation game developed by SMG Studio and DevM Games and published by Team17. It is a sequel to Moving Out. Players attempt to move objects across various levels without hitting objections. It combines elements of strategy, puzzle, and party video games. Team17 published it for Windows, Nintendo Switch, PlayStation 4, PlayStation 5, Xbox One, and Xbox Series X/S.

== Gameplay ==
Players attempt to move items from one location to another while avoiding obstacles. It plays similarly to Moving Out and includes elements of strategy, puzzle, and party video games. Later levels include additional environmental elements not found in the first game, such as one-way doors, teleporters, and time-limited passages. It features single-player and cooperative multiplayer, both online and local. Online multiplayer is a first for the series. It supports up to four players at once.

The game also supports a robust list of accessibility features. Similar to the original it has an assist mode which features enabling longer time limits, skipping levels after failing, reduced difficulty and objects disappearing on delivery, among others. Players can also change button mappings, user interface settings (such as font size and color) and disable certain repeating animations on levels to avoid motion sickness.

== Downloadable Content ==
The first DLC, F.A.R.Tastic Four Pack, was released at the launch of the game and was included with certain pre-orders. It was later released for purchase. It includes four new characters: Chum, Bastion, Hootacris and Cera Tops.

== Development ==
Developer SMG Studio is based in Sydney, Australia. Team17 released Moving Out 2 on August 15, 2023.

== Reception ==
Moving Out 2 received positive reviews on Metacritic. Although they criticized the single-player game for not being as much fun, IGN said the co-op gameplay is "as challenging as it is charming" and praised its humor. Nintendo Life praised the environments, scenarios, humor, and multiplayer, but they criticized the performance on Switch. Slant Magazine called it a "fun-packed, faster-paced, wackier sequel" and said its silliness rests on "enjoyable, rock-solid gameplay". Push Square said Moving Out 2 "can get a little repetitive" and the gameplay is "quite familiar", but they said it is "a solid good time" when played in bursts. They recommended it to fans of Overcooked and ultimately found it to be "a successful follow-up" to Moving Out.
