= Death Squared =

2017 puzzle video game

- Developer: SMG Studio
- Publisher: SMG Studio
- Engine: Unity
- Platforms: Windows; macOS; Nintendo Switch; Xbox One; PlayStation 4; iOS; Android; AirConsole
- Release: March 14, 2017: Windows, Mac, PS4, Xbox One; March 14, 2017; Switch; July 13, 2017; iOS; February 13, 2018; Android; March 28, 2018
- Genre: Puzzle
- Mode: Co-op mode; multiplayer; single-player

Death Squared is a puzzle video game developed and published by SMG Studio. It was released in 2017 for Microsoft Windows, macOS and Nintendo Switch, PS4 and Xbox One, and in 2018 for iOS and Android.

== Gameplay ==
Death Squared is a puzzle game centered around guiding color-coded cube-shaped robots to their designated goal zones. Moving the robots around can trigger changes in the environment, such as shifting platforms, rising spikes or activating lasers. The game features a Story Mode that can be played solo or cooperatively with one other player and a Party Mode that supports cooperative play for up to four players.

== Reception ==
Reception

Aggregate score
Aggregator	Score
Metacritic	(NS) 78/100 (PS4) 72/100 (XONE) 80/100

Review scores
Publication	Score
Nintendo Life	8/10
Nintendo World Report	8/10
Push Square	6/10

Death Squared received "generally favorable" reviews for the Nintendo Switch and Xbox One versions, while the PlayStation 4 version received "mixed or average" reviews, according to review aggregator Metacritic. Writing for Destructoid, Kevin McClusky gave a positive review of the Nintendo Switch version of the game, saying that while the single player mode is enjoyable, it was "much more fun" to "give the second controller to another player and shout advice at one another as you try to work your way through the maze." McClusky also complimented the level design, calling the levels "clean and easy to read" and while he noticed some lag while the game was in fullscreen mode calling it "annoying" he mentioned it never affected the gameplay and was hopeful that it would be addressed in a future software update.

In his positive review Nintendo Life reviewer Matthew Mason gave the game 8/10 stars, indicating that the game was "great". He said that while it was "cooperative at its core" it was "imminently [sic] playable as a solo experience" and that he found sitting next to someone watching them play it to be a pleasurable experience.

The game was nominated for "Australian Developed Game of the Year" at the Australian Games Awards 2018.
