= PowerWash Simulator =

2022 video game

- Developer: FuturLab
- Publisher: Square Enix Collective
- Director: James Marsden
- Producer: Toby Adam-Smith
- Designer: Dan Chequer
- Programmer: Peter Hansen
- Artists: Sean Frisby; Kev Martin; Torger Naerland
- Writer: Mark Ginbey
- Composer: Dan Bibby
- Engine: Unity
- Platforms: Windows; Xbox One; Xbox Series X/S; Nintendo Switch; PlayStation 4; PlayStation 5; Meta Quest (2, Pro, 3); macOS; iOS; tvOS; visionOS
- Release: Windows, Xbox One, Xbox Series X/S; 14 July 2022; Switch, PS4, PS5; 31 January 2023; Meta Quest (2, Pro, 3); 2 November 2023 macOS, iOS, tvOS, visionOS; 3 December 2025
- Genre: Simulation
- Modes: Single-player, multiplayer

PowerWash Simulator is a 2022 simulation video game developed by British studio FuturLab and published by Square Enix Collective. Players manage a power washing business and complete various jobs to earn money. Gameplay primarily revolves around using a power washer to clean dirt off of objects and buildings.

The game was first made available in early access through Steam on 19 May 2021, and was fully released for Microsoft Windows, Xbox One, and Xbox Series X/S on 14 July 2022. Further ports for the Nintendo Switch, PlayStation 4 and PlayStation 5, were for a 31 January 2023 release. A standalone VR port titled PowerWash Simulator VR for Meta Quest 2, Meta Quest 3 and Meta Quest Pro was released on 2 November 2023. A sequel, PowerWash Simulator 2, was released in 2025.

== Gameplay ==
An example of one of the game's environments, a skate park; portions have been cleaned, while other areas remain covered in grime.

PowerWash Simulator is a simulation game played in the first-person perspective. Set in the fictional town of Muckingham, players manage a small power washing business and take on jobs for a variety of clients in different locations in the form of levels. The main career mode features a total of 38 jobs, with several bonus jobs also available. Using a power washer, players remove dirt, grime, lichen, moss and rust from various vehicles and locations, ranging from residential houses to a Mars rover, to complete each job. The power washer is equipped with four washer nozzles with varying power and spray diameter, making each one best suited for a specific type of surface. Cleaning solutions designed for specific surfaces can be applied. Progress bars in the user interface indicate how much debris remains in the level or on individual objects, and the player can press a button to highlight any dirt remaining. Upon completing a job, players earn money that can be reinvested to purchase cosmetic items and upgrade their power washing tools. These upgrades allow the player to customise their washer to be more effective at certain ranges or in certain situations. Some levels grant players the use of a ladder or scaffolding, which can be placed to reach higher areas.

The game features online cooperative multiplayer for two players in career mode, and up to six players in free play. Players can join sessions in progress or matchmake to join an existing game. All scenarios and environments are available in cooperative play. An additional single-player challenge mode tasks players with completing certain jobs with limited water or within a time limit, with players being ranked based on their performance.

== Plot ==
At the beginning of the game, the player character has just started their own power washing business in the town of Muckingham. They are gifted a van by their friend, archaeologist Harper Shaw, who helps them find their first few clients. During each job, the power washer character receives text messages from the client; these text messages often include information about the location or vehicle being cleaned, explanations on how it became so dirty, and their thoughts on things going on around Muckingham. As the power washer completes each job, their reputation around town grows and they are hired for more work by returning and new clients.

Over the following weeks, the people of Muckingham begin noticing strange occurrences, such as unusual activity near the dormant Mount Rushless volcano and the disappearance of all of Muckingham's cats, including Mayor Jeff Jefferson XIII's cat Ulysses. Further messages reveal that Mayor Jefferson has been diverting the town's water to an illegal mining operation by corrupt tycoon Blake Thrust, leading the mayor to flee the town. Eventually, the power washer is hired to clean a flying saucer controlled by time-travelling scientists from the year 2278. One of the scientists, Ceruleon Skye, explains they were investigating the impending eruption of Mount Rushless, which in their future triggered the eruption of every volcano on the Pacific Rim, blocking out the sky with ash for decades and causing near global extinction. However, Thrust shot down their ship and stole some of its technology, upsetting the timeline and causing the volcano to become active ahead of schedule.

Several previous clients begin evacuating from Muckingham to escape the volcano. Shaw discovers two ancient merman statues unearthed by the recent seismic activity, one of which fires a beam towards Mount Rushless after being cleaned, and the other of which points to a temple emerging from the ocean, the fishy smell of which had attracted Muckingham's cats. With the help of some of their clients, the power washer reaches the temple, finding it filled with tributes to themself. When the power washer finishes cleaning the temple, a gem emerges that fires another beam at the volcano. Thrust's private jet flies towards the temple, but it is shot down by the flying saucer. Skye notifies the power washer that the temple was built by the Pacifists, the Pacific counterparts of the Atlanteans, and that Thrust's search for their civilization and its rare ores punctured Mount Rushless's magma chamber, triggering its premature eruption. To prevent this, Skye travelled back to the Pacifists' time and told them the power washer's story, and they agreed to convert the temple into an offshore platform with a neutralizing beam that would stop Mount Rushless from erupting when cleaned by an experienced power washer. With the timeline now safe, the power washer returns to their business, finding Ulysses hiding in their van with her kittens.

== Development ==
FuturLab is a smaller developer that had previously released games like Velocity 2X. Company founder James Marsden encouraged FuturLab to remain video game genre-agnostic. During a brainstorming session about first-person shooter (FPS) ideas suitable for a small studio, Marsden made "a throwaway comment" about an "FPS powerwashing game." Development director Kirsty Rigden, who had recently been watching power-washing videos, immediately took interest in the idea. The company put together a prototype that was released on Itch.io where it received positive reception, and it inspired the company to move forward with a larger release. PowerWash Simulator has had several downloadable content packs that have released since launch that feature other companies' intellectual property. FuturLab hired a licensing and business development manager to work full-time with companies and brands, and secured permission to use Square Enix properties for free for their initial releases, partially due to their relationship with them as their publisher. Paramount was the first company to grant a license to use their characters from SpongeBob SquarePants, and other companies waited to see the pack's performance before agreeing to licenses.

== Release ==
The game was first released for Microsoft Windows on 19 May 2021 via Steam's early access feature.

Several bonus jobs have been added to the game via a series of free updates and content packs since launch, the last of which was released on 29 May 2025. Multiple "Special Pack" expansions themed after other media franchises have been released as downloadable content. These include the "Tomb Raider Special Pack" on 31 January 2023; the Final Fantasy VII Remake-themed "Midgar Special Pack" on 2 March 2023; the "SpongeBob SquarePants Special Pack" on 29 June 2023; the "Back to the Future Special Pack" on 16 November 2023; the "Warhammer 40,000 Special Pack" on 27 February 2024, the "Alice's Adventures Special Pack" on 2 July 2024, the "Shrek Special Pack" on 10 October 2024, and the "Wallace & Gromit Special Pack" on 4 March 2025.

== Reception ==
Reception

Aggregate score
Aggregator	Score
Metacritic	PC: 73/100; XSXS: 75/100; NS: 84/100; PS5: 75/100

Review scores
Publication	Score
IGN	7/10
Pure Xbox	8/10

=== Pre-release ===
Cass Marshall of Polygon praised the game for its casual gameplay, writing that it "[captures] the most relaxing bits of home care with none of the hassle." Jordan Devore of Destructoid also praised the game for its "robust" gameplay, but noted that slight issues were present in the game's demo, including walking on slopes and finishing the last portion of levels. Gabriel Zamora of PCMag similarly gave praise to the satisfying gameplay loop, relaxing game feel, variety of items to clean, and "terrific" graphical style and presentation but took issue with the "poorly implemented" soap system, "unnatural" water and dirt simulation, "bland" sound, and "sluggish" character movement.

=== Critical reception ===
PowerWash Simulator received "generally favorable" reviews according to review aggregation website Metacritic, but received "mixed or average" reviews for the Windows version.

Ed Thorn of Rock Paper Shotgun praised the game's career mode, zen-like gameplay feel, variety of substantial modes, and addition of online co-op, but criticised the pacing of some jobs, concluding, "...issues with the game are small in comparison with the true satisfaction and serene spaces it provides...It's not overly complex, doesn't take itself too seriously, and still has plenty of depth for those who just want to hose down a bungalow." Fraser Gilbert of Pure Xbox appreciated its intuitive gameplay, leisurely pace, variety of modes, and inclusion of online co-op while noting its repetitive nature and lack of a proper soundtrack.

== Sequel ==
A sequel, PowerWash Simulator 2, was released on 23 October 2025 for Windows, Nintendo Switch 2, PlayStation 5 and Xbox Series X/S without involvement from Square Enix Collective.
