= Moving Out (video game) =

2020 cooperative moving simulation video game

- Developers: DevM Games; SMG Studio
- Publisher: Team17
- Director: Brett White
- Producer: Nick Pantis
- Designers: Jan Rigerl; Brodie Duncanson; Dave Lockman
- Programmer: Stephen Woolcock
- Artist: Jonathan Swanson
- Writer: Mike Rosenthal
- Composer: Jacek Tuschewski
- Series: Moving Out
- Engine: Unity
- Platforms: Microsoft Windows; Nintendo Switch; PlayStation 4; Xbox One; Amazon Luna
- Release: Windows, Switch, PlayStation 4, Xbox One; April 28, 2020; Amazon Luna; January 28, 2021
- Genres: Puzzle, action
- Modes: Single-player, multiplayer

Moving Out is a 2020 cooperative moving simulation game developed by Swedish studio DevM Games and Australian developer SMG Studio. In a local cooperative experience, players move objects from houses into a moving van while coping with exaggerated physics. The game was released for Microsoft Windows, Nintendo Switch, PlayStation 4, and Xbox One on April 28, 2020, and for Amazon Luna on January 28, 2021.

A sequel, titled Moving Out 2, was released on August 15, 2023.

== Gameplay ==
Players in Moving Out take on the role of movers, moving marked furniture and appliances (such as couches, refrigerators, and microwaves) from a house to a moving truck under a time limit. Along the way, obstacles like rakes, fires, ice, and even ghosts may be encountered. Some heavy objects require two people to move, while other objects are fragile and may be easily broken. Objects may be thrown. Players are ranked on a bronze, silver and gold scale, based on how quickly all of the objects are packed into the moving truck. The levels also have optional objectives, such as breaking all of the house's windows or packing an unmarked object. Additional bonus levels may also be unlocked.

Moving Out features an "Assist Mode" feature, which helps reduce game difficulty. With this feature, the player can add extra time to the time limit, vanish objects on delivery, remove obstacles, make objects lighter or even skip levels.

== Downloadable content ==
The first DLC, the Employees of the Month Pack, contains four new playable characters: Professor Inkle, Bruce, Sprinkles and Dials.

In February 2021, an expansion via DLC for all supported platforms was released under the name Movers in Paradise, which added 14 new levels in a tropical environment as well as new characters and new types of items to be moved. New game mechanics include cranks, jetpacks, fans, breakable walls and rafts, which can add puzzle elements to levels. Reviewers agreed that if someone enjoyed the main game that they would also enjoy the expansion. They also commended its low price, but there was some criticism regarding its relatively short length.

A free downloadable update introduced a new game mode for 12 of the original game levels which reverse the game play; asking players to remove items from a moving truck and place them in appropriate locations. The update also included new character costumes and dance moves.

== Development ==
The idea came from developer Jan Rigerl helping a friend move. Rigerl noted he became fascinated with the process and the strategies involved in such things as "moving a couch around a hallway choke point or fitting multiple things into the elevator" and also noting that the concept would appeal to people because of the general poor reception most moving companies have. He started to develop such a game but as it grew in size he decided to team up with Ashley Ringrose, CEO of SMG Games. Ringrose had previously collaborated with Rigerl and had been trying unsuccessfully to get him join the studio. SMG's previous game Death Squared helped inform the game development, as they wanted to avoid the mistakes made with that game with Ringrose stating that the lessons were "Focus on a strong, vibrant and visual identity. Have a name that's fun and doesn't mention Death! And have strong characters people can identify with."

Upon the game's announcement comparisons began being made to Overcooked, a similar multiplayer game released a few years earlier. Ringrose has noted that prior to Moving Out's prototype being made he never played Overcooked and while embracing the comparison as a "shorthand reference", he also noted the various differences including Moving Out having a more focused single player experience.

A sequel, titled Moving Out 2, was released on August 15, 2023 for Microsoft Windows, Nintendo Switch, PlayStation 4, PlayStation 5, Xbox One, and Xbox Series X/S.

== Reception ==
Reception

Aggregate score
Aggregator	Score
Metacritic	PC: 79/100; NS: 77/100; PS4: 74/100; XONE: 78/100

Review scores
Publication	Score
Eurogamer	Recommended
Game Informer	6.5/10
GamesRadar+	3.5/5
IGN	8/10

Moving Out has received generally positive reviews, with most reviewers commending its multiplayer game play. Comparisons to Overcooked were common.
