= PowerWash Simulator 2 =

2025 video game

- Developer: FuturLab
- Publisher: FuturLab
- Director: Dan Chequer
- Producer: Franck Dias
- Designer: Nick McCarthy
- Programmers: Martin Finch; John Atkinson
- Artist: Torger Naerland
- Writer: Mark Ginbey
- Composers: Steve Collett; Tim Cotterell
- Platforms: Nintendo Switch 2; PlayStation 5; Windows; Xbox Series X/S
- Release: 23 October 2025
- Genre: Simulation
- Modes: Single-player, multiplayer

PowerWash Simulator 2 is a simulation video game developed and published by British studio FuturLab. It is the sequel to PowerWash Simulator (2022), and builds on that game's core gameplay with additional mechanics. The game was released in October 2025 on Nintendo Switch 2, PlayStation 5, Windows, and Xbox Series X/S.

== Gameplay ==
PowerWash Simulator 2 retains the same basic gameplay loop as the original game, with players using power washing equipment to remove dirt and grime from the surfaces of objects until they are completely cleaned. While cleaning, players can switch between different nozzles, which affect the strength and diameter of the water spray, including a new adaptable nozzle which can be manually adjusted. In the original game, players could use soap to instantly clean tougher stains, though they had limited quantities available and were required to purchase refills, with different types of soap being effective on different surfaces; in the sequel, soap is no longer limited, is effective on all surfaces, and when applied to grime will now stay visible, making tougher stains easier for players to clean. Players are also able to obtain a circular surface cleaner, allowing them to clean flat surfaces more effectively due to its wider radius. New mission-specific tools available to players include an adjustable scissor lift for cleaning areas at different heights, and abseiling equipment for moving along walls while cleaning. An added "dirt finder" feature automatically highlights areas on the map with dirt remaining when the player has nearly completed a job. Multiplayer options have been expanded, including the addition of split-screen local multiplayer, and support for shared campaign progression in online multiplayer.

While the original game was set almost entirely within the fictional town of Muckingham, the sequel expands the range of locations to other cities and towns within the surrounding Caldera County, such as Lubri City and Pumpton. A total of 38 jobs are available in the base game. Certain jobs feature multi-stage progression, requiring players to finish cleaning available objects before the next set are revealed, such as cleaning the exterior of a restroom before the interior becomes available. New to the sequel is the home base, which acts as a central hub that the player can return to between power washing jobs. There, the player can clean furniture and use it to customize the home base's appearance, select new jobs from a large map, or interact with their pet cats. Completing each job adds a memento to a shelf in the home base's office, which can be selected to replay jobs. Players will earn money and PowerWash Points through gameplay, which can be spent on new power washing equipment and upgrades, new cosmetics for the power washer, and new furniture for the home base.

== Plot ==
Three years after preventing the eruption of the Mount Rushless volcano, (Note: As depicted in PowerWash Simulator (2022)) the power washer and their friend Harper Shaw have purchased a new building for their business in Muckingham. Now once again equipped, the power washer begins taking on new jobs across Caldera County, receiving periodic text messages from clients about the objects being cleaned and other recent goings-on.

As the power washer resumes work, disgraced former Muckingham mayor Jeff Jefferson XIII becomes the mayor of all of Caldera County and announces a competition for a "Town of the Year" award, hoping to extort favors from the towns in exchange for better chances of winning. This leads to multiple new jobs for the Power Washer due to towns beginning renovation initiatives to win the competition, as well as cleanup after protests of the mayor's overt corruption. Jefferson also demands the return of his cat Ulysses, whom the power washer and Shaw have been caring for since the mayor abandoned her, threatening legal action if they do not comply. At the same time, the jewels from Muckingham's giant merman statue go missing, disabling the stabilising beam to Mount Rushless.

While cleaning the local monks' temple, the power washer opens a secret passage, discovering Shaw's old cell phone inside. On it, they find messages from the time traveler Ceruleon Skye, who was trapped in the past while trying to prevent another cataclysm in the power washer's time, warning that the power washer needs to restore the stolen jewels to the statue. The power washer learns from geologist Karen Chissell that the jewels are made from pacithyst, a rare mineral created by the collision of an unknown planet with Earth eons ago, which is what Blake Thrust was seeking when he began his mining operation three years prior. Chissell also reveals that since the jewels' removal, a significant amount of seismic activity has been detected at Mount Rushless and on the moon, which has begun visibly spinning in the sky.

The power washer cleans the home of Xavion LeSage, a lawyer who secluded himself after his attempts to bring Jefferson to justice were foiled by a dirty jury. LeSage explains that Jefferson has legal right to Ulysses due to a lack of formal transfer of ownership. The power washer also learns of a covert mining operation being conducted, one which has continually failed due to equipment being disabled by a mysterious roving dirt storm. When hired to clean a transport truck that was caught in the storm, the power washer manages to open it and finds the stolen jewels inside, along with a phone containing messages which implicate Jefferson as the thief, having planned to smuggle the jewels to Thrust. Under LeSage's prosecution, Jefferson is stripped of his position and arrested, and the power washer becomes Ulysses' legal owner.

While the people of Caldera County hold a communal festival in place of the Town of the Year ceremony, Shaw reinstalls the jewels, triggering a second beam, but the moon remains out of control. The power washer follows the beam to Mount Rushless, discovering a door leading to a massive pacithyst deposit and an unknown Pacifist relic. Finding that the dirt is preventing the beam from activating the relic, the power washer cleans it, triggering another beam that fires at the moon, returning its rotation to normal. Satisfied that the world is safe, the power washer watches the festival fireworks show with Ulysses and her kittens.

== Development and release ==
FuturLab lead designer Nick McCarthy noted that after the success of the first game, the company was looking to "evolve" the original game and iterate on it instead of building a different experience. For the larger levels of the game that they were developing, FuturLab decided to add equipment like a scissor lift to make it easier for players to traverse the spaces.

The game was announced on 13 March 2025 for Windows, PlayStation 5 and Xbox Series X/S. A Nintendo Switch 2 version was subsequently announced on 12 September. While the previous series entry was published by Square Enix Collective, PowerWash Simulator 2 is instead being independently published by FuturLab themselves. The game was released on 23 October 2025, and was available via Xbox Game Pass at launch. The game attracted some attention for its low US$25 price point, at a time when several publishers were increasing the prices of their games due to tariffs and other economic factors. Like its predecessor, PowerWash Simulator 2 has received additional bonus jobs via free updates, as well as paid downloadable content based on other media properties, including Adventure Time in April 2026, Star Wars in July 2026, and Barbie in December 2026.

== Reception ==
Reception

Aggregate score
Aggregator	Score
Metacritic	(PC) 82/100 (PS5) 82/100

Review scores
Publication	Score
Destructoid	8.5/10
Eurogamer	4/5
Game Informer	7.5/10
GameSpot	7/10
IGN	8/10
Push Square	7/10
Shacknews	9/10

PowerWash Simulator 2 received "generally favorable" reviews from critics, according to review aggregator website Metacritic.

IGN's Rachel Weber described the game as a "rare example" of a sequel that tweaked the right mechanics, and specifically praised the gameplay mechanic that allowed the player to used soap becoming free as an example of these improvements. Destructoid's Adam Newell noted that the game improved on the original in several areas, from better controls to improved level design. GameSpot's Mark Delaney also noted the improvements and praised the online multiplayer for sharing progression with the single player mode, but felt that overall, the sequel played it safer than it needed to.

PowerWash Simulator 2 was nominated for the "Family" and "British" game categories of the 2026 BAFTA Games Awards.
