= SMG Studio =

Video game developer

- Industry: Video games
- Founded: July 2013
- Founder: Ashley Ringrose
- Headquarters: Sydney, Australia
- Area served: Worldwide
- Website: smgstudio.com

SMG Studio is a video game developer based in Sydney, Australia. They are best known for their video games Death Squared (2017), Moving Out (2020), Lego Party (2025) and the One More series. Their first release, Over The Top Tower Defence, first launched for mobile devices on May 24, 2014.

SMG Studio was one of ten companies which received funding from Screen Australia's Games Enterprise in 2013.

== History ==
SMG Studio was established in 2013 as a gaming unit of Soap Creative, an Australian digital creative agency founded in 2002.

SMG Studio was acquired by multinational digital marketing group Dentsu in February 2015.

== Products ==
- ThumbZilla (2011)
- Over The Top Tower Defence (2014)
- One More Line (2014)
- One More Dash (2015)
- Risk: Global Domination (2015)
- One More Jump (2016)
- One More Bounce (2016)
- Thumb Drift (2016)
- Death Squared (2017)
- Super One More Jump (2018)
- No Way Home (2020)
- Moving Out (2020)
- SP!NG (2021)
- Moving Out 2 (2023)
- Lego Party (2025)
