= SockMonkey Studios =

British video game studio

- Industry: Video games
- Founded: February 2013
- Headquarters: Middlesbrough, England
- Key people: Bob Makin; Darren Cuthbert; Darren Falcus; Ron Ashtiani
- Owner: Behaviour Interactive (2023–present)
- Website: sockmonkeystudios.net

Behaviour UK – North (formerly SockMonkey Studios) is a British video game developer, founded by Teesside University graduates Bob Makin and Darren Cuthbert, in Middlesbrough, North East England.

== History ==
Founded in February 2013 with the help of DigitalCity, prior to SockMonkey Studios Makin and Cuthbert worked at other studios including Team17, Jagex and Iguana.

Makin and Cuthbert were later joined by industry veteran Darren Falcus. Building their foundation on primarily work for hire jobs, the studio collaborated with numerous video game companies such as SEGA, Double Eleven and Team 17 to assist in the porting of their games to other consoles.

After setting up their offices on Victoria Road in Middlesbrough, in 2015 they moved their headquarters to the Phoenix Building at Teesside University, moving again to Boho 5 as the studio grew and as of 2021 reside at 16/26 Albert Road North in Middlesbrough.

From its inception, the studio experienced growth due to increasing demand within the gaming industry and by 2020 had added dozens of positions. In 2019 alone they reported doubling the headcount in their Teesside office.

In 2020, during an expansion phase, Ron Ashtiani – former CEO of Sumo Group's Atomhawk Business – was added to the board of directors. During 2020, the studio also received funding from Northern Powerhouse Investment Fund.

In February 2023 it was announced that SockMonkey Studios had been acquired by Behaviour Interactive, becoming Behaviour UK – North.

== Contract work ==
Although the studio also worked on full-scale development, SockMonkey was predominantly a work-for-hire studio, having worked globally on contracts for both PC and console, including US-based developers such as tinyBuild and Outfit7.

== Awards ==
Year	Institution	Award	Result
2015	GameBridge	Business Award	Won
2020	Tees Tech Awards 2020	Tech Ambassador	Nominated
2020	Tees Tech Awards 2020	Company of the Year	Nominated
2020	North East Business Awards	Small Business Award: Teesside	Won
2020	North East Business Awards	Small Business Award: Grand Final	Won
2021	Tees Tech Awards 2021	Unsung Hero: Darren Falcus	Won
2021	Tees Tech Awards 2021	Business Leader: Bob Makin	Won
2022	Tees Tech Awards 2022	Company of the Year	Nominated
2022	Game Dev Heroes Awards 2022	Design Hero 2022: Dewi Roberts	Nominated
2022	Gi.biz Best Places to Work 2022	Best Boss UK : Bob Makin	Nominated
2022	Gi.biz Best Places to Work 2022	Best Places to Work: Small Company	Won
2023	Velocitees Awards	Job Creation: Small Business	Nominated
2023	Velocitees Awards	Turnover: Small Business	Nominated

== Games ==
Year	Game title	Role	Notes
2013	Wurdy	Development	
2014	Joe Danger	Porting	Ported to Android
2014	SockaMonkeys	Full Development	
2014	The Soccer Monkey	Full Development	
2015	Joe Danger Infinity	Porting	Ported to Android
2015	Unannounced Title	Porting	Unreleased title
2016	Farm Fighters	Development	Added online multiplayer and design work
2016	Kingdom Conquest (Unreleased)	Art and Animation	Unreleased mobile title
2017	The Rocky Horror Show: Touch Me	Development	Code development
2017	PlayPhoto	Development	Addition of Imessage add-on
2017	The Escapists	Porting	
2018	Beat the Intro	Development	
2018	Songbringer	Porting	Ported to Nintendo Switch
2018	Prison Architect	Porting	Ported to Nintendo Switch
2019	Prison Architect	Development	Created content and updates for console and PC
2020	Talking Tom Candy Run	Porting	Ported to Nintendo Switch, Xbox One and PlayStation 4, and added Multiplayer Mode
2020	Deliver Us the Moon	Porting	Ported to Xbox One and PlayStation 4
2020	Tens!	Porting and Development	Ported to PC, Mac and Nintendo Switch added content, Story Mode and Multiplayer Mode
2020	Kill it with Fire	Porting	Ported to Nintendo Switch, Xbox One, PlayStation 4, iOS and Android
2021	Totally Accurate Battlegrounds	Development	Co-development of future updates and content and changing the game from premium to free to play
2022	Happy's Humble Burger Farm	Porting	Ported to Xbox One, PlayStation 4 and Nintendo Switch
2022	Little Orpheus	Porting and Development	Remastered and Ported to Xbox One, PlayStation 4 / 5, Switch and PC
2022	Tinykin	Porting	Ported to Xbox One, Xbox Series X/S, MS Store, PlayStation 4 / 5 and Switch
2022	CoComelon: Play with JJ	Full Development	Nintendo Switch
