= Stage Fright (video game) =

Upcoming co-op adventure video game

- Developer: Ghost Town Games
- Publisher: Hello Games
- Platforms: Windows; Nintendo Switch; Nintendo Switch 2
- Release: 2027
- Genres: Adventure, puzzle
- Mode: Multiplayer

Stage Fright is an upcoming cooperative adventure game developed by Ghost Town Games and published by Hello Games. Intended for two players, it combines exploration and puzzles that require players to share information, with a story centred on three children in a mysterious town. The game was announced in December 2024, and is scheduled for release in 2027 for Windows, Nintendo Switch and Nintendo Switch 2.

== Gameplay ==
Stage Fright is designed for two people playing either locally or online. Players control different combinations of three children, Drew, Blake and Charlie, as they investigate an unexplained mystery. Progress involves exploring environments, overcoming hazards and completing puzzles with elements of escape rooms. The story is structured around the children's changing relationships and the different perspectives through which they experience events.

The game uses a persistent split-screen presentation, including when played online. The two players may be situated in different places or have access to different information, requiring them to describe what they see in order to progress. Some activities assign different tasks to each player; the developers have said that the allocation of roles changes as the story proceeds. They cited a sequence in which one player directs a spotlight while the other remains within its illuminated area to avoid danger.

Although it retains some action-based challenges, the games places less emphasis on continuous time pressure than Ghost Town Games' earlier Overcooked titles. Puzzles incorporate different kinds of reasoning, and the developers intend for players with differing levels of experience to participate. The game uses physical objects rather than a conventional inventory system, while communication between the players is central to solving puzzles.

== Development and release ==
Stage Fright is being developed by Ghost Town Games, the studio responsible for Overcooked. The project was known internally as Project Attic, a reference to the attic in which core team members had been working. The development team included studio co-founders Oli De-Vine and Phil Duncan, writer Gemma Langford, and additional contributors.

Hello Games, known for developing No Man's Sky, is publishing the game. This is the company's first reported publishing project for a game developed by another studio. According to Hello Games representatives, the arrangement grew out of a longstanding relationship with Ghost Town Games, which had previously received assistance from Hello Games in finding a publisher for Overcooked.

The game was revealed at The Game Awards 2024 in December 2024. Contemporary coverage described its two-player cooperative format and a setting influenced in part by Luigi's Mansion, while noting the mixture of puzzles and more hectic sequences associated with Overcooked.

In interviews published in October 2026, developers De-Vine and Duncan explained that the team had moved away from the repeated, time-limited tasks of Overcooked in favour of a longer, story-led experience. They described communication as the main means by which the players overcome challenges, rather than requiring both players to have similar skill with a controller. The developers also said that the game would alternate between more demanding sections and periods in which players could consider puzzles without the same time pressure.

A gameplay trailer was shown during a Nintendo Direct presentation in September 2026, when Nintendo Switch and Nintendo Switch 2 versions were confirmed alongside the previously announced PC version. The game is scheduled for release in 2027.
