= British Academy Games Award for Evolving Game =

Video game award

- Awarded for: The best ongoing game
- Country: United Kingdom
- Presented by: British Academy of Film and Television Arts
- Currently held by: No Man's Sky
- Website: www.bafta.org/games

The British Academy Video Games Award for Evolving Game is an award presented annually by the British Academy of Film and Television Arts (BAFTA). It is given in honor to "the best game that displays excellence in ongoing developer support", this includes games that "receive ongoing content and updates".

The award was first presented at the 11th British Academy Games Awards in 2015 to League of Legends under the name of Persistent Game. The category received its current name in 2017 at the 13th edition. Since the inception of the award, no game has ever won more than once. No Man's Sky has the most nominations at 7, and also has 1 win. Destiny, Destiny 2 and Apex Legends are tied for most nominations without a win, with three each. Hello Games is the most nominated developer, with seven. Among publishers, Activision have the most nominations without a win, with five.

The current holder of the award is No Man's Sky by Hello Games, which won at the 22nd British Academy Games Awards in 2026.

== Winners and nominees ==
In the following table, the years are listed as per BAFTA convention, and generally correspond to the year of game release in the United Kingdom.

Table key
Indicates the winner

Year	Game	Developer(s)	Publisher(s)	Ref.
2014 (11th)	League of Legends	Riot Games		
2014 (11th)	Destiny	Bungie	Activision	
2014 (11th)	EVE Online: Phoebe	CCP Games		
2014 (11th)	World of Warcraft: Warlords of Draenor	Blizzard Entertainment		
2014 (11th)	World of Tanks (PC Edition)	Wargaming		
2015 (12th)	Prison Architect	Introversion Software		
2015 (12th)	Destiny: The Taken King	Bungie	Activision	
2015 (12th)	Final Fantasy XIV: A Realm Reborn	Square Enix		
2015 (12th)	Guitar Hero Live	FreeStyleGames	Activision	
2015 (12th)	Lego Dimensions	Jon Burton, James McLoughlin and Dave Dootson, Traveller's Tales	Warner Bros. Interactive Entertainment	
2015 (12th)	The Witcher 3: Wild Hunt	CD Projekt Red	CD Projekt	
2016 (13th)	Rocket League	Psyonix		
2016 (13th)	Destiny: Rise of Iron	Bungie	Activision	
2016 (13th)	Elite Dangerous: Horizons	Frontier Developments		
2016 (13th)	EVE Online	CCP Games		
2016 (13th)	Final Fantasy XIV: A Realm Reborn	Square Enix		
2016 (13th)	Hitman	IO Interactive	Square Enix	
2017 (14th)	Overwatch	Blizzard Entertainment		
2017 (14th)	Clash Royale	Supercell		
2017 (14th)	Final Fantasy XV	Square Enix		
2017 (14th)	Fortnite	Epic Games		
2017 (14th)	PlayerUnknown's Battlegrounds	PUBG Corp	Bluehole, Inc.	
2017 (14th)	Tom Clancy's Rainbow Six Siege	Ubisoft Montreal	Ubisoft	
2018 (15th)	Fortnite	Epic Games		
2018 (15th)	Destiny 2: Forsaken	Bungie	Activision	
2018 (15th)	Elite Dangerous: Beyond	Frontier		
2018 (15th)	Overwatch	Blizzard Entertainment		
2018 (15th)	Sea of Thieves	Rare	Microsoft Studios	
2018 (15th)	Tom Clancy's Rainbow Six Siege	Ubisoft Montreal	Ubisoft	
2019 (16th)	Path of Exile	Grinding Gear Games		
2019 (16th)	Apex Legends	Chad Grenier, Drew McCoy, Respawn Entertainment	Electronic Arts	
2019 (16th)	Destiny 2	Bungie		
2019 (16th)	Final Fantasy XIV: Shadowbringers	Square Enix		
2019 (16th)	Fortnite	Epic Games		
2019 (16th)	No Man's Sky: Beyond	Hello Games		
2020 (17th)	Sea of Thieves	Rare	Xbox Game Studios	
2020 (17th)	Destiny 2: Beyond Light	Bungie		
2020 (17th)	Dreams	Media Molecule	Sony Interactive Entertainment	
2020 (17th)	No Man's Sky	Hello Games		
2020 (17th)	Fall Guys	Mediatonic	Devolver Digital	
2020 (17th)	Fortnite	Epic Games		
2021 (18th)	No Man's Sky	Hello Games		
2021 (18th)	Among Us	Innersloth		
2021 (18th)	Animal Crossing: New Horizons	Nintendo EPD	Nintendo	
2021 (18th)	Apex Legends	Respawn Entertainment	Electronic Arts	
2021 (18th)	Disco Elysium	ZA/UM		
2021 (18th)	Fortnite	Epic Games		
2022 (19th)	Final Fantasy XIV Online	Creative Business Unit III	Square Enix	
2022 (19th)	Dreams	Media Molecule	Sony Interactive Entertainment	
2022 (19th)	The Elder Scrolls Online	ZeniMax Online Studios	Bethesda Softworks	
2022 (19th)	Apex Legends	Respawn Entertainment	Electronic Arts	
2022 (19th)	Forza Horizon 5	Playground Games	Xbox Game Studios	
2022 (19th)	No Man's Sky	Hello Games		
2023 (20th)	Cyberpunk 2077	CD Projekt RED	CD Projekt	
2023 (20th)	Final Fantasy XIV Online	Creative Business Unit III	Square Enix	
2023 (20th)	Fortnite	Epic Games		
2023 (20th)	Forza Horizon 5	Playground Games	Xbox Game Studios	
2023 (20th)	Genshin Impact	HoYoverse		
2023 (20th)	No Man's Sky	Hello Games		
2024 (21st)	Vampire Survivors	poncle		
2024 (21st)	Final Fantasy XIV Online	Creative Business Unit III	Square Enix	
2024 (21st)	No Man's Sky	Hello Games		
2024 (21st)	Sea of Thieves	Rare	Xbox Game Studios	
2024 (21st)	Diablo 4	Blizzard Entertainment		
2024 (21st)	World of Warcraft	Blizzard Entertainment		
2025 (22nd)	No Man's Sky	Hello Games		
2025 (22nd)	Fallout 76	Bethesda Game Studios		
2025 (22nd)	Helldivers 2	Arrowhead Game Studios	Sony Interactive Entertainment	
2025 (22nd)	HITMAN World of Assassination	IO Interactive		
2025 (22nd)	Vampire Survivors	poncle		
2025 (22nd)	Warhammer 40,000: Space Marine 2	Saber Interactive	Focus Entertainment	

== Multiple nominations ==
=== Games ===
The following games received two or more nominations, including their nominated updates or expansions:

Nominations	Game
7	No Man's Sky
6	Final Fantasy XIV
6	Fortnite
3	Destiny
3	Destiny 2
3	Apex Legends
3	Sea of Thieves
2	EVE Online
2	Elite: Dangerous
2	Overwatch
2	Tom Clancy's Rainbow Six Siege
2	Dreams
2	Vampire Survivors

=== Developers ===
Developer	Nominations	Wins
Bungie	6	0
Epic Games	6	1
Hello Games	7	1
Square Enix	4	1
Blizzard Entertainment	5	1
Respawn Entertainment	3	0
CCP Games	2	0
Frontier Developments	2	0
Media Molecule	2	0
Ubisoft Montreal	2	0
poncle	2	1
IO Interactive	2	0

=== Publishers ===
Developer	Nominations	Wins
Activision	5	0
Square Enix	8	1
Blizzard Entertainment	5	1
CCP Games	2	0
Epic Games	5	1
Electronic Arts	3	0
Bungie	2	0
Frontier Developments	2	0
Hello Games	5	1
Sony Interactive Entertainment	2	0
Ubisoft	2	0
Xbox Game Studios	5	1
