= Joe Danger Infinity =

2014 video game

- Developer: Hello Games
- Publisher: Hello Games
- Platform: iOS
- Release: January 9, 2014
- Genre: Endless runner
- Mode: Single-player

Joe Danger Infinity is a 2014 endless runner game developed and published by the British indie studio Hello Games. The game was released for iOS on January 9, 2014, and was met with a positive reception.

== Release ==
Infinity was intended as an upgrade to Joe Danger, but due to the excessive amount of added features, Infinity had to be made into a separate game.

Hello Games announced Infinity in December 2013. The game was released for iOS on January 9, 2014.

== Reception ==
Reception

Aggregate score
| Aggregator | Score |
|---|---|
| Metacritic | 80/100 |

Review scores
| Publication | Score |
|---|---|
| Destructoid | 7/10 |
| Edge | 7/10 |
| Eurogamer | 8/10 |
| Game Informer | 8/10 |
| Gamezebo | 4/5 |
| IGN | 8.6/10 |
| MacLife | 4/5 |
| Pocket Gamer | 4/5 |
| TouchArcade | 3.5/5 |
| USgamer | 3.5/5 |
| Digital Spy | 5/5 |
| National Post | 7/10 |

On Metacritic, Infinity received "generally favorable" reviews.

Other critics received the game positively.
