= Light No Fire =

Upcoming video game

- Developer: Hello Games
- Publisher: Hello Games
- Platform: Windows
- Genres: Adventure, MMO
- Mode: Multiplayer

Light No Fire is an upcoming adventure and open world video game developed by Hello Games. Announced at The Game Awards 2023, Light No Fire is set on a fictional world similar to Earth, where players survive in a procedural landscape. The game is expected to be released after 2026, and has been confirmed for Windows.

== Setting ==
Light No Fire has been described as "a game about adventure, building, survival and exploration together" and "an ambitious open world the size of planet Earth". The game itself is set on a multiplayer, procedurally generated planet, with a fantasy theme. Weapons and magic are a primary aspect of the title, with Stone Age cabins observed as player abodes. The official website said "Light No Fire presents you with an ancient earth to uncover".

== Development ==
Light No Fire was announced at The Game Awards 2023 by developer Hello Games. Managing director Sean Murray said that the game had already been in development since 2018. Murray confirmed that the development team for Light No Fire is small.

Light No Fire uses the same internal engine as No Man's Sky, and several of the developments made for Light No Fire have been adapted and added in various updates for the latter. The engine had to be highly optimized for Light No Fire, which led the ability for Hello.Games to port No Man's Sky to iOS by October 2026.

A trailer was released in an August 2025 No Man's Sky "Voyagers" update post from Hello Games, describing the planet as "shared, with real oceans to traverse, needing large boats and crews". David W. Duffy of TheGamer described No Man's Sky's "Worlds Part 1" update as a "proof of concept" for the "fantasy-themed Super-Earth" of Light No Fire, citing the storms and realistic water effects visible in the trailer. Screenshots featuring dragons and rabbits were published to 4Gamer in December 2023.

== Release ==
A release date for Light No Fire has not yet been given by Hello Games. Estimates put the release date sometime after 2026. Sean Murray was absent from The Game Awards 2025 and Summer Game Fest 2025. After No Man's Sky was nominated for the "Labor of Love" award at The Steam Awards 2025, Murray gave a brief update on Light No Fire, saying, "I am really pleased with the progress we are making". Some players took cryptic emojis that Murray posted ahead of updates for No Man's Sky as possible hints towards Light No Fire , though Murray has confirmed that these updates share elements they had developed for Light No Fire. In interviews discussing the tenth anniversary of No Man's Sky during August 2026, Murray has expected they would have had material to show for Light No Fire, but to avoid the problems that No Man's Sky had at launch, where Murray had engaged in extensive press that had set higher expectations on the game's state than where they actually were at release, Murray opted to wait until they were closer to release to share more details and avoid setting expectations.

Light No Fire has only been confirmed for Steam, with other platforms yet to be announced.
