= Joe Danger 2: The Movie =

2012 racing and platform video game

- The "movie poster" for Joe Danger: The Movie
- Developer: Hello Games
- Publishers: Hello Games; Microsoft Studios (XBLA)
- Director: David Ream
- Producer: Daniel Gray
- Artist: Grant Duncan
- Composer: Paul Weir
- Platforms: PlayStation 3, Xbox 360, Windows, OS X, Linux, PlayStation Vita
- Release: 14 September 2012: Xbox 360; WW: 14 September 2012; PlayStation 3; NA: 9 October 2012; EU: 10 October 2012; Windows; WW: 24 June 2013; OS X, Linux; WW: 7 January 2014; PlayStation Vita; NA: 13 January 2015; EU: 14 January 2015
- Genres: Racing, platform
- Modes: Single-player, multiplayer

Joe Danger 2: The Movie is a racing and platform video game developed by Hello Games for the PlayStation 3, Xbox 360, Microsoft Windows, Mac OS X, Linux and PlayStation Vita. According to Hello Games' managing director, it is "kind of" a sequel to the successful Joe Danger. The game was announced in August 2011 and released for Xbox 360 on 14 September 2012 and 9 October 2012 for PlayStation 3. A Microsoft Windows version was released on 24 June 2013, followed by Mac OS X and Linux on 7 January 2014, and PlayStation Vita in January 2015. The game centers around the titular character, stuntman Joe Danger, as he performs stunts for an action film. It features multiple vehicle types and has local multiplayer for up to four players.

== Gameplay ==
Joe Danger 2 brings new scenarios and vehicles for the titular stuntman character.

Joe Danger 2: The Movie is a pseudo-sequel to its predecessor. In it, stuntman Joe Danger has gained favor with a movie director in Hollywood and is brought on to perform all the stunts on set. The fictional movie sequences consist entirely of cliche action stunts, and so he must perform chase scenes on mini carts, skis, and police bikes. This spans 25 stages across five acts, with a director's cut unlocking once all stages are complete. This gives alternative stages and scenarios to play. Secondary objectives can be completed in each stage. Each level has collectable letters spelling D-A-N-G-E-R, similar to the Tony Hawk's Pro Skater games and the collection of the letters S-K-A-T-E. Other secondary objects are themed according to the stage and what the scene for the movie requires.

The game features a level editor that allows players to create their own scenarios. Local multiplayer is available for up to four players. The PlayStation 3 version also features additional Gaiden stages, which are additional motorcycle-based challenges that are a "throwback to when [Hello Games] made the original Joe Danger", according to Sean Murray. Players can unlock various helmets and racing suits, and Joe's main racing suit and helmet are available as avatar awards on the Xbox 360. A downloadable content pack was released entitled Undead Movie, which featured several Halloween and horror themed environments and characters such as zombies, werewolves, and a suit for Joe akin to Marvel Comics' Ghost Rider. In total, it adds 15 stages and six new characters to the game.

== Development and marketing ==
Following the commercial success of Joe Danger, Hello Games began to run job adverts on their website, indicating work on a new project. They began to hire and moved offices towards the end of the year. After an announcement on Hello Games' website the week before, Joe Danger: The Movie, as it was then known, was presented for the first time at Gamescom in Cologne in August 2011. The game has similar gameplay, but takes place on the set of a film about the daredevil; players complete objectives unique to each level set by a "mysterious director". IGN noted that the premise is a "good excuse" to parody famous scenes from certain films.

Sean Murray told Matt Miller of Game Informer that the game is "kind of" a sequel to Joe Danger, but that he envisioned the game as big enough to dwarf the original. He indicated the game involves "a load of vehicles" in a variety of locales. At the Penny Arcade Expo, the game was presented on both Microsoft Windows and Xbox 360, which Stephen Totilo of Kotaku interpreted as a broadening of scope for the studio; a promotional image released with the announcement indicated Hello were unsure of how it would be released. The game was released on PlayStation 3 and Xbox 360 on 14 September 2012. It was released on Microsoft Windows on 24 June 2013, followed by Mac OS X and Linux on 7 January 2014. This release features Team Fortress 2 characters and Minecraft-themed levels. A PlayStation Vita release followed in January 2015, featuring Sackboy and Tearway, characters from the PlayStation LittleBigPlanet franchise.

== Reviews ==
Joe Danger 2: The Movie

Aggregate score
Aggregator	Score
Metacritic	78/100 (PS3); 81/100 (PS Vita); 82/100 (PC); 82/100 (X360)

Review scores
Publication	Score
Eurogamer	8/10
Game Informer	8.25/10
IGN	8/10
Official Xbox Magazine (UK)	9/10
PC Gamer (US)	8.5/10
Pocket Gamer	4/5
Push Square	8/10

Joe Danger 2: The Movie received generally favorable reviews. On review aggregator Metacritic it holds a score of 78/100, 79/100, 82/100 and 82/100 for PlayStation 3, PlayStation Vita, Microsoft Windows and Xbox 360, respectively.
