= No Man's Sky =

2016 video game

- Cover art by Simon Stålenhag
- Developer: Hello Games
- Publisher: Hello Games (Note: Sony Interactive Entertainment published the PS4 physical version.) (Note: 505 Games published the Xbox One physical version.) (Note: Bandai Namco published the Nintendo Switch and PS5 physical versions.)
- Producer: Will Braham
- Designer: Gareth Bourn
- Programmers: Daniel Armesto; Iain Brown; Simon Carter; Harry Denholm; Ryan Doyle; Innes McKendrick; Sean Murray; David Ream; Charlie Tangora
- Artists: Aaron Andrews; Grant Duncan; Jake Golding; Beau Lamb; Levi Naess
- Composers: 65daysofstatic; Earcom / Paul Weir
- Platforms: iOS; macOS; Nintendo Switch; Nintendo Switch 2; PlayStation 4; PlayStation 5; Windows; Xbox One; Xbox Series X/S
- Release: 9 August 2016: PlayStation 4; NA: 9 August 2016; EU: 10 August 2016 Windows; WW: 12 August 2016 Xbox One; WW: 24 July 2018 Xbox Series X/S; WW: 10 November 2020 PlayStation 5; NA/OC: 12 November 2020; WW: 19 November 2020 Nintendo Switch; WW: 7 October 2022 macOS; WW: 1 June 2023 Nintendo Switch 2; WW: 5 June 2025 iOS; WW: 28 October 2026
- Genres: Action-adventure, survival
- Modes: Single-player, multiplayer (Note: The game lacked multiplayer features at launch, but they were added with the "Next" update in August 2018. See description of multiplayer features and issues found with multiplayer after release for details.)

No Man's Sky is an action-adventure survival game developed and published by Hello Games. It was released worldwide for the PlayStation 4 and Windows in August 2016, for Xbox One in July 2018, for the PlayStation 5 and Xbox Series X and Series S consoles in November 2020, for Nintendo Switch in October 2022, for macOS in June 2023, for Nintendo Switch 2 in June 2025, and for iOS in October 2026.

The game is built around four pillars: exploration, survival, combat, and trading. Players can engage with the entirety of a procedurally generated deterministic open world universe, which includes over 18 quintillion planets. Through the game's procedural generation system, planets have their own ecosystems with unique forms of flora and fauna, and various alien species may engage the player in combat or trade within planetary systems. Players advance by mining resources to power and improve their equipment, buying and selling resources using currencies earned by documenting flora and fauna or trading with the lifeforms, building planetary bases and expanding space fleets, or otherwise following the game's overarching plot by seeking out the mystery around the entity known as The Atlas.

Sean Murray, the founder of Hello Games, wanted to create a game that captured the sense of exploration and optimism of science fiction literature and art of the 1970s and 1980s. The game was developed over three years by a small team at Hello Games with promotional and publishing help from Sony Interactive Entertainment. The gaming media saw this as an ambitious project for a small team, and Murray and Hello Games drew significant attention leading to its release.

No Man's Sky initially received mixed reviews at its 2016 launch, with some critics praising the technical achievements of the procedurally generated universe, while others considered the gameplay lackluster and repetitive. However, the critical response was marred by the lack of several features that had been reported to be featured, particularly multiplayer capabilities. The game was further criticised due to Hello Games's lack of communication in the months following the launch, creating backlash from some of its players. Murray later stated that Hello Games had failed to control the hype and the larger-than-expected player count at launch, and have taken an approach of remaining quiet about updates until they are nearly ready to release. The promotion and marketing for No Man's Sky became a subject of debate and has been cited as an example of what to avoid in video game marketing.

Since the game's initial release, Hello Games has continued to improve and expand No Man's Sky to achieve the vision of the experience they wanted to build. The game has received multiple free major content updates that have added several previously missing features, such as multiplayer components, while adding features like surface vehicles, base-building, space fleet management, cross-platform play, and virtual reality support. This has substantially improved No Man's Sky's overall reception, with multiple websites citing it as one of the greatest redemption stories in the gaming industry.

== Gameplay ==
No Man's Sky allows players to explore planets with procedurally generated flora and fauna.

No Man's Sky is an action-adventure survival game played from a first or third person perspective that allows players to engage in four principal activities: exploration, survival, combat, and trading. The player takes the role of a specimen of alien humanoid planetary explorer, known in-game as a Traveller or Anomaly, in an uncharted universe. They start on a randomised planet near a crashed spacecraft towards the edge of the galaxy and are equipped with a survival exosuit with a jetpack and a "multitool" that can be used to scan, mine and collect resources as well as to attack or defend from creatures and hostile forces. The player can upgrade, change, repair, and refuel the ship, allowing them to travel around the planet, between other planets or in open space inside the local planetary system, as well as engage in space combat with alien factions, or make hyperspace jumps to other star systems. While the game is open-ended, the player may follow the guidance of the entity known as The Atlas to head toward the centre of the galaxy, following the main story line.

The defining feature of No Man's Sky is that nearly all parts of the galaxy, including stars, planets, flora and fauna on these planets, and sentient alien encounters, are created through procedural generation using deterministic algorithms and random number generators from a single seed number. This 64-bit value leads to there being over 18 quintillion (Note: Specifically, the number of planets is 2^{64} or 18,446,744,073,709,551,616.) (1.8×10^{19}) planets to explore within the game. As of August 2026, the game's ten year anniversary, Murray said that players had visited less than 1% of the planets in the game. Very little data is stored on the game's servers, as all elements are created through deterministic calculations when the player is near them, assuring that other players will see the same elements as another player by travelling to the same location in the galaxy. The player may make temporary changes on planets, such as mining resources, but these changes are not tracked once the player leaves that vicinity. Until July 2020, the game used different servers for each platform; following a July 2020 patch, cross-platform play was enabled for all supported platforms.

Ships of players in a space environment, flying towards a hive of glass

Through exploration, the player is credited with units, the main in-game currency, by scanning planets, alien bases, flora and fauna in their travels. If the player is first to discover one of these, they can earn additional units by uploading this information to The Atlas, as well as having their name credited with the discovery to be seen by other players. Players have the opportunity to rename these features at this point within limits set by a content filter. No Man's Sky can be played offline, but interaction with The Atlas requires online connectivity.

The player must ensure the survival of the Traveller, as many planets have dangerous atmospheres such as extreme temperatures, toxic gases, and dangerous storms. Though the player can seek shelter at alien bases or caves, these environments will wear away at the exosuit's hazard protection module and can kill the Traveller. Thus the player must collect resources necessary for survival. By collecting blueprints, the player can use resources to craft upgrades to their exosuit, multitool, and spacecraft to make survival easier, with several of these upgrades working in synergistic manners to improve the survivability and capabilities of the Traveller. Each of these elements have a limited number of slots for both upgrades and resource space, requiring the player to manage inventories and feature sets, though the player can either gain new slots for the exosuit or purchase new ships and multitools with more slots. The player may also buy additional slots for his starship or use storage augmentations. Many features of the exosuit, multitool, and spacecraft need to be refuelled after prolonged use, using collected resources as a fuel source.

While on a planet, the Traveller may be attacked by hostile creatures. They also may be attacked by Sentinels, a self-replicating robot force that patrols the planets and takes action against those that take the planet's resources or attack peaceful fauna. Players may also be attacked for taking special resources, such as gravitino balls, or directly assaulting sentinels. The player can fend these off using the weapons installed on the multitool. The game uses a "wanted level". Low wanted levels may cause small drones to appear which may be easily fought off, while walking machines, such as the Walker or Quad can assault the player at higher wanted levels. While in space, the Traveller may be attacked by pirates seeking cargo, or by alien factions with whom they have a poor reputation. The player can use the ship's weapon systems to engage in these battles. Should the Traveller die on a planet, he'll be respawned at his last save point without his exosuit's inventory; the player can recover these materials if the player can reach the last death location. The player cannot respawn if playing on Permadeath mode. If the Traveller dies in space, they will similarly respawn at the local system's space station, but having lost all the goods aboard his ship. Again, these goods can be recovered by travelling to the point at which the player died in space, but with the added uncertainty of pirates claiming the goods first.

Most star systems have a space station where the Traveller can trade resources, multitools, and ships, and interact with one or more aliens from three different races that populate the galaxy as well as other travellers. Trading posts on planets offer similar functions. Each alien race has its own language, with word-for-word substitutions which initially will be nonsense to the player. By frequent communications with that race, as well as finding monoliths scattered on planets that help in translating, the player can better understand these languages and perform proper actions when interacting with the alien non-player characters, gaining favour from the alien and its race for future trading and combat. Consequentially, improper responses to aliens may cause them to dislike the Traveller, and their space-bound fleets may attack the Traveller on sight. The game includes a free market galactic store accessible at space stations and trading posts, where some resources and goods have higher values in some systems compared to others, enabling the player to profit on resource gathering and subsequent trade.

The game has deep crafting capabilities, allowing players to craft technology upgrades, components for more complex items, tradable resources, base construction parts, food and ammo. Crafting requires blueprints, which are unlocked by digging up data modules and trading them in at space stations. Resources are stored in inventories in the player's exosuit, ship, freighter, exocraft, nutrient processor, and storage containers. Resources can be processed into other resources using refiners or nutrient processors, allowing all kinds of food to be created.

No Man's Sky is primarily designed as a single-player game, though discoveries can be shared to all players via the Steam Workshop, and friends can track each other on the game's galactic map. Hello Games's Sean Murray stated that one might spend about forty hours of game-time to reach the centre of the galaxy if no side activities are performed, but he also said that he fully anticipated that players would play the game in a manner that suits them, such as having those that might try to catalogue the flora and fauna in the universe, while others may attempt to set up trade routes between planets. Players can track friends on the galactic map and the system maps. Due to limited multiplayer aspects at launch, Sony did not require PlayStation 4 users to have a PlayStation Plus subscription to play the game online.

=== Post-release updates ===
Since its release, No Man's Sky has gained numerous free updates which have added in new gameplay features, including those originally envisioned by Hello Games but not included by release such as base building, alongside gameplay and engine improvements, quality of life features, and bug fixes. Murray said that such expansions to bring in new features were more appropriate than offering downloadable content due to the procedural generation systems within the game. Former Sony executive Shahid Ahmad, who led Sony's efforts to get No Man's Sky, stated that Hello Games had a planned schedule of updates for the game as early as 2013. With the release of "Sentinel" in February 2022, Murray said that Hello Games considers No Man's Sky nowhere near finished, as "the team are always coming up with new things that they want to do with the game: new content and features and areas for improvement." Later patches starting with "Worlds, Part One", were based on technology and gameplay that Hello Games had developed for their next game, Light No Fire, and brought into No Man's Sky. For example, Murray said that the Voyagers update, which introduced customized spaceships with expandable interiors, were based on similar technology that will be in Light No Fire to support ocean-going vessels. Murray says that they plan to continue to release updates to No Man's Sky following the release of Light No Fire.

With the "Expeditions" update in March 2021, the game has introduced time-limited Expeditions that are curated experiences to introduce various features of the gameplay through milestones. Players can earn rewards consisting of customization options that can be redeemed in any other saved game. For example, one such reward during the second seasonal expedition was the ability to unlock a version of the Normandy, the spacecraft from the Mass Effect series from BioWare, coinciding with the release of Mass Effect Legendary Edition. Another Expedition in October 2021 just ahead of both Halloween and the release of the theatrical Dune adaptation, introduced giant worms to the game's fauna. A seventh expedition named "Leviathan", released in May 2022, introduced "space whale" organic frigates, which can be recruited into a player's frigate fleet. More recently, Expeditions have been released after each major update to introduce the new gameplay features of that update to the player, and with the "Omega" update, players can start an Expedition with an existing character, bringing in a limited set of resources to help them get started, and then return with their gains back into their original save at the conclusion of the expedition.

List of major updates to No Man's Sky
Release date	Patch name	New features	Ref.
November 2016	Foundation	User-made bases built from modular components, which can be crewed by recruited aliens, customizable space freighters for transporting goods across systems, and the addition of the "Survival" and "Creative" gameplay modes.	
March 2017	Pathfinder	Ability to share bases with other players, new exocraft to aid in exploration of planet's surfaces, and the addition of a Permadeath gameplay mode.	
August 2017	Atlas Rises	Addition of new narrative branch to main game's storyline, procedurally-generated missions available at space stations, and joint Exploration support for up to 16 players on the same planet with voice and text chat support. Considered the "Important first step into the world of synchronous co-op".; This was preceded by the "Waking Titan" alternate reality game.	
July 2018	Next	Added support for Xbox One and WeGame, a full multiplayer experience, and the ability to acquire fleets of ships.; This update also revamped procedural generation of planets, And introduced weekly community missions.; Introduction of Galactic Atlas, an external website used for tracking discoveries; Introduction of third-person perspective	
October 2018	The Abyss	Expanded aquatic biomes features include new creatures, underwater bases, and personal submarine vessels	
November 2018	Visions	Expansion of biome types, with introduction of new abnormal flora and fauna; Added crashed freighters, alien bases, and fossilized creatures that provide valuable in-game resources	
August 2019	Beyond	Expansion of multiplayer experience with larger player counts; Virtual reality support; Industrial resource automation for bases	
November 2019	Synthesis	Expanded inventory systems; Starship upgrading	
February 2020	Living Ship	Addition of sentient living ships along with narrative elements	
April 2020	Exo-Mech	Addition of mechanized suits that can be used to traverse hazardous planets and increase resource gathering	
July 2020	Desolation	Addition of abandoned and infested starships	
September 2020	Origins	Increased variation in flora and fauna generation; Binary and trinary star systems; Volcanos and localized weather patterns	
November 2020	Next Generation	Added support for PlayStation 5 and Xbox Series X and Series S consoles; Improved visuals for newer consoles and on Windows.	
February 2021	Companions	Added ability to tame creatures as pets to bring on further exploration.	
March 2021	Expeditions	Introduced short-term Expeditions, curated experiences to introduce players to new features within the game through various milestones, with ability to gain unique rewards for customization.	
June 2021	Prisms	Enhancement of visual effects; Support for NVidia DLSS for compatible systems	
September 2021	Frontiers	Addition of management and expansion of alien settlements; Expansion of base-building components	
February 2022	Sentinel	Expanded game combat systems, including expanded weapons and more difficult planetary defense systems.	
April 2022	Outlaws	Expanded starship combat	
July 2022	Endurance	Further expansion of base-building and freighter customization options	
October 2022	Waypoint	Support for Nintendo Switch, though without multiplayer features; Introduction of Relaxed gameplay mode with lower difficulty compared to standard	
February 2023	Fractal	Added support for PlayStation VR2, improved visuals for all VR versions; Introduction of additional activities for all players	
April 2023	Interceptor	Added support for macOS; Increased varieties of Sentinel units; Addition of corrupted worlds with rampant Sentinels	
August 2023	Echoes	Added fourth alien race based on sentient robots; Added pirate space fleets which can be fought and defeated	
February 2024	Omega	Allowed Expeditions to be started with established characters; Introduced planet-based mission; Ability to raid and capture pirate spacecraft	
March 2024	Orbital	Revamped layouts and appearances of planetary space stations; Added starship customization options	
July 2024	Worlds Part I	Overhaul of planetary generation systems; Improved water, cloud, and weather visual effects; Enhancement of localized weather systems	
September 2024	Aquarius	Addition of fishing, including creating bait, subsequent recipes using fish, and a water-borne fishing platform	
October 2024	The Cursed	Expedition themed around Lovecraftian horror	
January 2025	Worlds Part II	Addition of worlds like gas giants and water worlds, ability to create own system of planets.	
March 2025	Relics	Expansion of buried fossil and relic system.	
June 2025	Beacon	Adds support for Nintendo Switch 2. Improvements to settlement features allowing the player to manage multiple settlements.	
August 2025	Voyagers	Adds a new Corvette class starship with interior sections that can be used for planetary landings and space combat.	
October 2025	Breach	Expands range of Corvette parts, including salvaging parts from derelict ships.	
February 2026	Remnant	Adds ability to scavenge and manipulate large materials with multitool from planet surfaces and transport them through customized exocraft trucks	
April 2026	Xeno Arena	Adds ability to capture alien fauna and use them in fights against those from other players or NPCs, similar to Pokemon.	
May 2026	Swarm	Expedition where the collective player base split into three factions and fights off the Hive.	
September 2026	Cosmos	Adds customizable space stations, both within star systems and between stars along with other points of interest. Introduces player alliances.	
October 2026	Forsaken	Adds new corvette parts, interstellar trading options, and seamless warping to any visible star. Ties with iOS release.	

== Plot ==
The Traveller (the player character) wakes up on a remote planet with amnesia and must locate their crashed starship. After finding their starship, its computer guides the Traveller to make the necessary repairs and to collect the resources needed to fuel a hyperspace jump to another planetary system. During their voyage, the Traveller is guided by an unknown force to reach the centre of the galaxy, encountering individual members of three alien species - the Gek, the Korvax and the Vy'keen, that inhabit the galaxy.

Along the way to the centre, the Traveller is alerted to a presence of an anomaly in a nearby system. Travelling there, they find a special space station ("The Space Anomaly") where many strange aliens reside. Two of the aliens, Priest Entity Nada and Specialist Polo, have knowledge beyond what other aliens in the galaxy appear to possess, including being able to speak to the Traveller without translation. They tell of a strange being, found at the centre of the galaxy, and are able to guide the Traveller towards meeting it by directing them to a nearby black hole that can quickly take them closer to the centre.

As the Traveller continues on their journey, they begin receiving messages from an alien entity named Artemis. Artemis says that they are also a "Traveller" and wished to meet others of their kind, but were trapped on a sunless world after stepping through a strange, ancient portal. After triangulating Artemis' position and seeking help from the local alien species, the Traveller discovers that Artemis' location does not exist. Upon telling the news, the transmission ends mysteriously and the Traveller learns of yet another of their kind, named Apollo.

The Traveller contacts Apollo, telling them about Artemis' predicament. They are instructed by Apollo to uncover the connection between the portals and the Sentinels, the robotic beings protecting each planet. After a skirmish with the Sentinels, the Traveller passes through a portal and is taken aboard a large, unknown vessel in space, where they come face to face with the cosmic being Nada spoke about, named the Atlas. The Traveller is then sent to an unknown planet where they find the grave of Artemis, revealing Artemis has been dead the entire time. While trying to contact Apollo, the Traveller accidentally contacts a new entity named -null-, who tells the Traveller that Artemis can be saved using a "Mind Ark". Once they construct the Mind Ark, the Traveller is told to choose whether to upload Artemis' soul into a machine aboard the Anomaly or to let them die. Regardless of the choice, the Traveller is directed by a distress beacon to another portal where they learn that the Atlas is dying.

The Traveller becomes aware that they, like Nada and Polo, are unique from the other sentient beings in the galaxy, having some sense of the universe's construction and nature. It is revealed that the galaxy itself exists as a computer simulation managed by the supercomputer Atlas, and the Travellers are entities that were created by the Atlas to explore the simulation. It is also revealed how Nada and Polo met, and how they are "errors" that had become self-aware of being in a simulation and isolated themselves in the Anomaly to help others.

Eventually, the Traveller reaches the galaxy's centre, finding one final Atlas Interface. The Traveller must choose to either restart the simulation, saving the Atlas, or reject the offer.

If the Traveller chooses to reject the Atlas' offer, the main storyline ends and the Traveller is allowed to explore the galaxy as they wish. Otherwise, if the Traveller chooses to restart the simulation, they are teleported to the new galaxy, effectively restarting the game. It is then revealed that this has happened many times before, each time shortening the life of the Atlas - Atlas tries to observe the future past its death, but sees nothing, besides the hand of its creator on its glass casing.

The Echoes update continued the story by introducing a new robotic race, with a new story segment leading to the creation of a new class of Purple Star systems, which feature new planet types, including Gas giants and Ocean worlds, and new flora and fauna.

== Development ==
No Man's Sky represented Hello Games's vision of a broad, attention-getting game that they wanted to pursue while they secured their financial well-being through the Joe Danger series of games. The game's original prototype was worked on by Hello Games's Sean Murray, who wanted to create a game about the spirit of exploration inspired by the optimistic science fiction of Isaac Asimov, Arthur C. Clarke, and Robert Heinlein, and the cover artwork of these works in the 1970s and 1980s. Murray wanted to re-create the feelings of space exploration seen in older procedurally generated games, including the galaxies of Star Control II, Elite and Freelancer. Development expanded into a small four-person team prior to its first teaser in December 2013. About a dozen developers worked on the game in the three years leading up to its release, with Sony Interactive Entertainment providing promotional and marketing support. Sony formally announced the title during their press conference at the Electronic Entertainment Expo 2014, the first independently developed game to be presented at the Expo's centrepiece events.

"Elite was procedurally generated, and so were lots of games at the time, like Star Control and Freelancer. It's almost like we've gone back to those games. We're trying to explore ideas about openness, and vastness, and freedom."

— Sean Murray, Hello Games co-founder

The game's engine employs several deterministic algorithms such as parameterised mathematical equations that can mimic a wide range of geometry and structure found in nature. Art elements created by human artists are used and altered as well. The game's audio, including ambient sounds and its underlying soundtrack, also uses procedural generation methods from base samples created by audio designer Paul Weir and the British musical group 65daysofstatic.

== Release ==
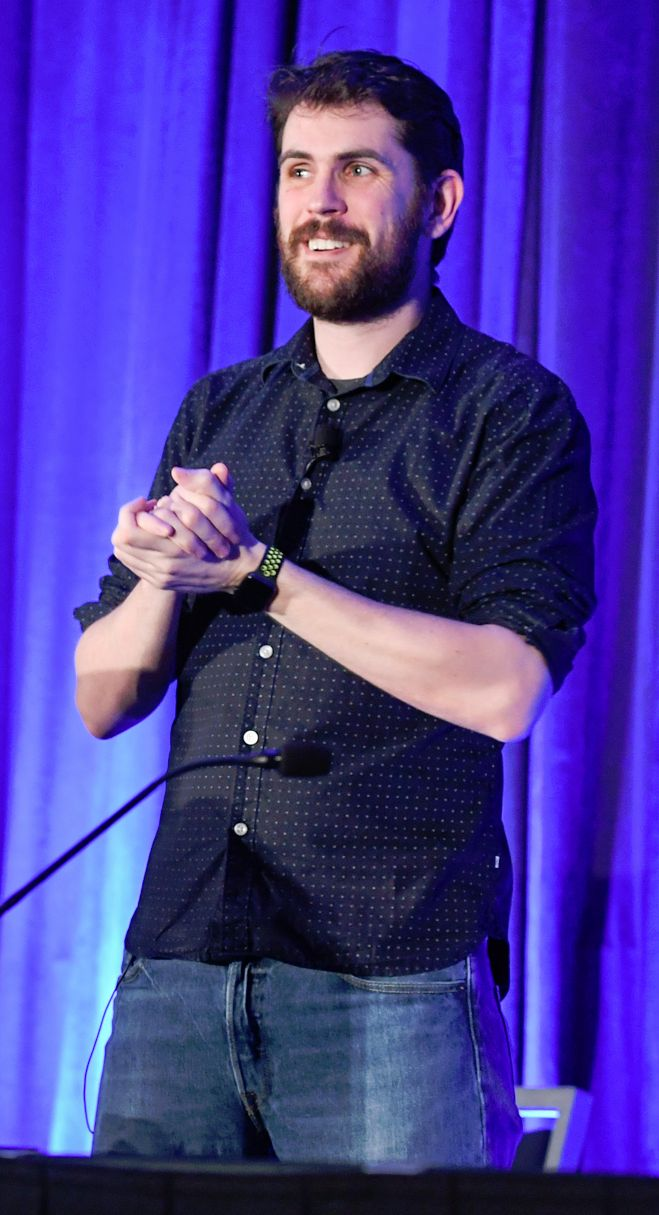
Hello Games co-founder Sean Murray at the 2017 Game Developers Conference

=== Promotion and marketing ===
No Man's Sky was revealed at the VGX Awards in December 2013, and subsequently gained significant attention from the gaming press. Hello Games sought help from a publisher and got the interest of Sony Interactive Entertainment (then Sony Computer Entertainment). Sony offered to provide development funding but Hello Games only requested financial assistance for promotion and publication. Sony presented the game at their media event during Electronic Entertainment Expo 2014 (E3); until that point, no independently developed game has been demonstrated during these centre-stage events.

Rumors circulated in the lead-up to the 2015 Paris Games Week in October 2015 that No Man's Sky would be released alongside Sony's press conference, but Murray and Sony denied these rumours. Instead, Sony used their press conference to announce the game's expected release in June 2016 for the PlayStation 4.

The game's scheduled release during the week of 21 June 2016 was announced in March 2016, along with the onset of preorders for both PlayStation 4 and Windows versions. Hello Games also announced that the PlayStation 4 version would also be available in both a standard and "Limited Edition" retail release, published by Sony, alongside the digital version. About a month before this planned release, Sony and Hello Games announced that the game would be delayed until August 2016, with Murray opting to use the few extra weeks as "some key moments needed extra polish to bring them up to our standards". Hello Games opted not to present at the Electronic Entertainment Expo 2016 in June 2016 so as to devote more time to polishing the game, with Murray noting that due to the structure of the game, "we get one shot to make this game and we can't mess it up." The game had gone gold on 7 July 2016, and was released on 9 August 2016.

The release date in the United Kingdom, originally slated for 12 August and two days after the rest of Europe, was later pushed up to 10 August due in part to a new deal Sony arranged with retailers to allow for simultaneous release in both regions. Two weeks before release, the worldwide Windows version release was pushed out a few days, to 12 August 2016. Murray stated through Twitter that they felt the best experience for players would be a simultaneous worldwide release on the Windows platform, something they could not control with the retail aspects that were associated with the regional PlayStation 4 market, and thus opted to hold back the Windows release to make this possible. They used the few extra days to finish additional technical features that they wanted to include at the Windows launch, such as multiple monitor widescreen support.

The limited edition retail version includes an art book and a comic written by Dave Gibbons, James Swallow and Angus McKie; Sony previously expressed interest in companion fiction for the game's release, and Murray had engaged with Gibbons on developing such a work. Swallow helped with some of the in-game narrative. A limited-run "Explorer's Edition" for the Windows version, published by iam8bit, included a miniature replica of one of the game's spacecraft alongside other materials. Sony released a limited edition bundle with No Man's Sky and a custom face plate for the PlayStation 4 in Europe.

The New Yorker featured No Man's Sky in their 2015 The New Yorker Festival as part of their inaugural Tech@Fest event, highlighting topics on the intersection of culture and technology. On 2 October 2015, Murray made an appearance and gave a demonstration of the game on The Late Show with Stephen Colbert, an American television late-night talk show.

In the weeks leading up to the game's release, Sony released a set of four videos, each focused on the principal activities of the game: exploring, fighting, trading, and surviving. Sony Interactive Entertainment Europe also released a television advertisement for the game featuring comedian Bill Bailey.

=== Intellectual property issues ===
Hello Games had been in legal negotiations with Sky Group (formerly Sky plc) over the trademark on the word "Sky" used for No Man's Sky, a trademark Sky had previously defended against Microsoft's choice of "SkyDrive". The issue was ultimately settled in June 2016, allowing Hello Games to continue to use the name.

A few weeks before the game's launch, No Man's Sky was claimed to be using the superformula based on work done by Dr. Johan Gielis in 2003 and subsequently patented by Gielis under the Dutch company Genicap which Gielis founded and serves as Chief Research Officer. Murray had mentioned the superformula while describing the procedural generation aspects of the game in an interview with The New Yorker during development. Genicap anticipates developing a software tool using the superformula for their own product that they can see being used in video game development, which Hello Games would be infringing on if they had used the superformula in the game. The company states they have attempted to reach out to Hello Games to ask them about its use for No Man's Sky but have not received anything back. Genicap said they did not want to stop the launch of No Man's Sky, considered the game to be "very impressive", and that they would like to talk more with Hello Games to exchange knowledge with them, but "if the formula is used we'll need to have a talk". Murray replied that No Man's Sky does not use the superformula, and was working to arrange a meeting with Genicap to discuss the situation and their respective mathematics. The patent expired in 2020.

=== Leaked copies and prerelease review delays ===
Two weeks before release, a Reddit user was able to purchase a leaked copy of the game for the PlayStation 4 from eBay for roughly $1,250, and started posting various videos of their experiences in the game. Other users claimed to have leaked copies and began sharing their own gameplay videos. Some of these reports included negative elements about the game, including frequent crashes and a much-shorter time to "complete" the game by reaching the centre of the virtual galaxy than Hello Games had claimed, leading many fans to express concern and frustration that the game might not be as good as they anticipated. In response, Murray asked people waiting for the game to avoid these spoilers, stating "We've spent years filling No Man's Sky with surprises. You've spent years waiting. Please don't spoil it for yourself."

Some retailers broke the street date, as several players, including journalists at Kotaku and Polygon, streamed their starting playthroughs of the game starting from 5 August 2016. Polygon noted that Sony had not issued any review embargoes for the game at this point. Hello Games reset the servers for the game just prior to 9 August 2016 so as to give all players a clean slate. Prior to release, Sony requested sites to take down videos from early copies, citing that due to the nature of the game, they considered that Hello Games's vision of the game would only be met once a day-one patch was made available at release. Some of these video takedowns had accidentally included users discussing the game but without using these prerelease footage videos, a situation that Murray and Sony worked to resolve.

The day-one patch, which Hello Games had been at work at since the game went gold in July, altered several aspects of how the procedurally generated universe was created, such that existing saves from previous copies would no longer work. This patch removed an exploit that was observed by prerelease players that allowed them to complete the game much faster than anticipated. Commentators noted that the patch would substantially change the aspects of the game previously critiqued by aforementioned early players, and believed some of the changes were made specifically to address these concerns.

Concern was raised by the fan community when OpenCritic, a review aggregator platform, stated that there were going to be no review copies of the game prior to the public release and a review embargo that would end on the date of release. The lack of review copies is a general sign within the industry that there are concerns by the developers or publishers that a game may not live up to expectations and thus indicates that they want to minimise any impact reviews may have prior to release. However, both OpenCritic and Sony later affirmed there would be prerelease review copies and that they were waiting on a prerelease patch before sending these out to journalists. Eurogamer noted that they had expected to have review copies by 5 August, but these were pushed until 8 August so as to get the day-one patch in place, a situation they attributed to the certification process required by Sony for any games on their service. Because of the late arrival of the review copies, and the size of the game, critics presented their reviews "in progress" over several days, omitting a final review score until they had completed enough of the game to their satisfaction.

At launch, a number of software bugs affected both the PlayStation 4 and Windows versions. A game-breaking bug occurred with an in-game preorder bonus spaceship players could collect that would potentially strand them on a planet, and a resource duplication exploit could significantly reduce the time needed to reach the game's endings. The Windows version garnered several reports of poor graphics rendering, framerates, and the inability to even start the game. Within a day, Hello Games had identified several of the common issues and issued patches while working to provide better technical support and resolve other issues. Murray stated that their initial patches for both systems would be "focused on customer support" before moving onto adding in new features.

=== Release on other platforms ===
Initially released on the PlayStation 4 and Windows, No Man's Sky has since expanded to several other gaming platforms. Xbox One support was released alongside the "Next" update in July 2018. Virtual reality support for HTC Vive, Steam VR, and PlayStation VR was added in the "Beyond" update in August 2019. PlayStation 5 and Xbox Series X and Series S versions were released in November 2020 alongside the "Next Generation" update. A port for the Nintendo Switch was released in October 2022 alongside the "Waypoint" update. The Switch version had been at work at Hello Games for a few years, according to the studio, and had several technical challenges they overcame but were able to make the version work on the lower-power hardware. The Switch version includes all updates through "Endurance". However, the game will not initially support multiplayer features, though Hello Games plans to add this in sometime after launch. Support for the PlayStation VR2 was released in February 2023 along with the "Fractal" update. PlayStation 5 Pro support was added in November 2024 along with cross platform save testing.

Apple announced that they have worked with Hello Games to bring the title to macOS and iPadOS, which will utilize the Metal framework with the MetalFX enhanced that Apple unveiled at the 2022 WWDC. The macOS port was released on 1 June 2023. An iOS version for both iPhone and iPad was released on 28 October 2026. Murray credited significant optimization improvements made for Light No Fire for them to be able to release No Man's Sky's on mobile platforms.

Cross-platform play between all released versions, save for the Switch, was introduced in June 2020.

An April 2019 update to the Windows version provided a complete overhaul of the graphics API replacing OpenGL with Vulkan. This brought performance improvements, particularly for players with AMD GPUs. The update includes improved loading times, HDR support and more graphic settings. The VR version of No Man's Sky was one of the first titles to support NVidia's Deep learning super sampling (DLSS) technology for VR games with a patch in May 2021.

=== Future ===
In 2014, Murray suggested the possibility of releasing modding tools for Windows players to alter the game, though noted that they would be limited, and would not allow players to create new planets in the game, for example. About a week after the Windows release players had already started to examine the game's files and create unofficial mods, with at least one mod-sharing website offering these for distribution. Hello Games have since provided patches that help to support these user mods.

Murray stated in an interview with IGN prior to release that virtual reality "would be a really good fit" for No Man's Sky, as the immersive experience could create "really intense moments within a game"; virtual reality support was subsequently announced as part of the free "Beyond" update in mid-2019. Murray also commented on the potential for a remastering of No Man's Sky for a system with more hardware capabilities, suggesting that they would be able to both increase the texture resolution and the degree of complexity of the flora and fauna on the planets.

== Reception ==
Reception

Aggregate scores
Aggregator	Score
Metacritic	PS4: 71/100; PC: 61/100; XONE: 77/100; NS: 83/100; NS2: 93/100; PS4 (Beyond): 83/100
OpenCritic	37% recommend

Review scores
Publication	Score
Destructoid	7/10
Electronic Gaming Monthly	7/10
Game Informer	7.5/10
GameRevolution	3.5/5
GameSpot	7/10
GamesRadar+	3.5/5
IGN	6/10
Nintendo Life	9/10
PC Gamer (US)	64/100
Polygon	6/10
The Guardian	4/5
USgamer	3.5/5
VideoGamer.com	6/10
PC Magazine	4/5
Time	4.5/5

The first introduction of No Man's Sky at the 2013 VGX awards was considered to be the best aspect of the awards presentation. Its expanded coverage at E3 2014 was also met with similar praise, with several critics considering it to have "stolen the show". The title won the show's "Best Original Game" and "Best Independent Game" by a panel of game critics, as well as receiving the "Special Commendation for Innovation" title.

Upon release, No Man's Sky received "mixed or average" reviews, according to review aggregator Metacritic, with the later release on Xbox One receiving "generally favorable reviews". Fellow review aggregator OpenCritic assessed that the game received fair approval, being recommended by 36% of critics. While many praised the technical achievement of No Man's Sky's procedurally generated universe, several found that the nature of the game can become repetitive and monotonous, with the survival gameplay elements being lacklustre and tedious. As summarised by Jake Swearingen in New York, "You can procedurally generate 18.6 quintillion unique planets, but you can't procedurally generate 18.6 quintillion unique things to do."

Some of the game's criticism stemmed from the limitations of what procedural generation can bring to a game. While the engine can produce a vast array of different planets, it is built atop a finite number of predetermined assets, such as basic creature shapes or planetary biomes, and one quickly exhausts these core assets even with the variations allowed by procedural generation. An evaluation of the game's code showed that Hello Games had the foresight to enable new predetermined assets to be added into the game through updates, which Gamasutra's Alissa McAloon suggested that with more artists to provide more content, Hello Games or third-parties could exponentially expand the perceived uniqueness of each planet. Kate Compton, who worked on the procedural generation elements of Spore, called this issue "procedural oatmeal", in that while it is possible to pour a near infinite number of bowls of oatmeal with various differences, the result still will look like a bowl of oatmeal. Compton noted that No Man's Sky lacks a quality of perceptual uniqueness, a problem that other game researchers are looking to try to solve to provide a more crafted but still procedurally generated experience to the player, placing less emphasis on the vastness of potential outcomes as No Man's Sky's marketing relied on.

Polygon's Ben Kuchera hypothesised that No Man's Sky could follow the same route as Destiny, a 2014 game that, at release, received lukewarm reviews as it lacked much of the potential that its developers and publishers had claimed in marketing, but became highly praised after several major updates. Kuchera referred to Hello Games's statements regarding new features, downloadable content, and tracking what players are interested in as evidence that No Man's Sky would evolve over time.

Reviewing the Switch version of the game, Shaun Musgrave of TouchArcade indicated that it would be one of the best games of the year for Nintendo's console. Reilly from Nintendo Life was surprised at how successful the game was in porting to the Switch, although there was some sacrifice in visual quality, and rated it excellent. Just pointed out as a negative factor the absence of multiplayer mode, something that is expected in future updates.

=== Music ===
The game's first soundtrack, No Man's Sky: Music for an Infinite Universe by 65daysofstatic, was released on 5 August 2016, and received positive reviews from music critics. The first 10 tracks of the album were composed by 65daysofstatic specifically for No Man's Sky and its planned OST. These tracks, along with other recording snippets, were then sampled/disassembled for use by the in-game procedural music engine. The final 6 tracks, on the other hand, are tracks generated by the procedural music engine that were then selected for inclusion in the album. Andrew Webster of The Verge described the soundtrack as an extension of past 65daysofstatic albums, particularly from Wild Light, but with a greater science-fiction vibe to it, considering the track "Asimov" to be like "taking flight into a Chris Foss painting". Sam Walker-Smart for Clash rated the album 8 out of 10, considered the album one of 65daysofstatic's best, and that it was "apocalyptic, transcendental and drenched in a sense of pure epic-ness".

On September 18, 2025, a second soundtrack was released. Titled No Man's Sky: Journeys, the album was created by 65daysofstatic and Hello Games' audio designer Paul Weir, and was published by Laced Records. Unlike Music for an Infinite Universe, Journeys features 32 tracks instead of 16, all of which are assembled from loops/snippets originally created exclusively for use by No Man's Sky's procedural music engine. The album also includes some previously unreleased audio snippets used outside of No Man's Sky (such as "Ident", the audio that is typically emitted by The Atlas at the end of the game's trailers). Certain tracks also contain spoken dialogue, which does not exist in-game - it is possible the voice providing the dialogue is that of The Atlas, based on information found in No Man's Sky's narrative and the Waking Titan ARG.

=== Sales ===
Within a day of the game's launch, Hello Games reported that more than 10 million distinct species were registered by players, exceeding the estimated 8.7 million species identified to date on Earth. On the first day of the Windows release, No Man's Sky saw more than 212,000 concurrent players on Steam, exceeding the largest number of concurrent players for most other games, including other 2016 releases such as XCOM 2 and Dark Souls III. Chart-Track reported that sales of the physical release of No Man's Sky in the United Kingdom during the first week was the second-largest PlayStation 4 launch title published by Sony, following Uncharted 4, and the fifth highest across all publishers and Sony formats. However, a week later, these numbers had dropped significantly; the concurrent player count on Steam fell under 23,000, and United Kingdom sales fell by 81% in the second week. The number of concurrent players on Steam fell to around 2,100 by the end of September 2016. While player dropoff after release is common in games, the dropoff rate for No Man's Sky was considered unusually high. Steam Spy reported that No Man's Sky had the third-highest "hype factor", a statistical measure of concurrent player dropoff from publicly available reports, of all games released on Steam from the start of 2016 to August of that year.

The game was the top downloaded title from the PlayStation Store in the month of August 2016. Physical sales of No Man's Sky across both PlayStation 4 and Windows in August 2016 made it the second-highest selling game in North America by revenue that month, according to NPD Group. SuperData Research stated that for the month of August 2016, No Man's Sky was the second highest-grossing game in digital sales across all consoles, and sixth-highest for PC. Steam developer Valve reported that No Man's Sky was one of the top twelve highest-grossing revenue games available on the platform during 2016, while Steam Spy estimated that more than 823,000 copies were sold in 2016 for a total gross revenue of more than $43 million. With the release of "Next" and the Xbox One version of the title in July 2018, SuperData reported No Man's Sky was the sixth top-selling console game globally for the month, bringing in around US$24 million across all platforms. At the 2019 Game Developers Conference, Murray stated that sales figures for No Man's Sky Next were comparable to what would satisfy a large AAA publisher at launch. After the game was added to the Xbox Game Pass service in June 2020, Hello Games reported a month later that No Man's Sky had seen more than one million new players.

Player counts on Steam typically spike briefly after each new major update, with the "Voyagers" update in August 2025 which introduced the ability to build customized spacecraft, the player counts reached the game's highest point since the game's launch, with numerous players sharing their spacecraft creations on social media. Murray said "Often during development you lose perspective, and you can't see the wood for the trees. With Voyagers though, even from the earliest days it was obvious there was something really special about just flying around in a ship you built with your friends. It's just something that we've all seen glimpses of in other games, but there's a certain magic about exploring the universe in your own USS Enterprise or Millennium Falcon."

=== Awards ===
The game has notably received six nominations for Best Community Support from The Game Awards, two wins for Best Ongoing Game at The Game Awards 2020 and The Game Awards 2025, seven nominations (with two wins) for Evolving Game from the BAFTA Games Awards, as well as several other nominations and wins from the likes of SXSW Gaming Awards, Golden Joystick Awards, and others.

Year	Award	Category	Result	Ref(s).
2014	2014 Game Critics Awards	Best of Show	Nominated	
2014	2014 Game Critics Awards	Best Original Game	Won	
2014	2014 Game Critics Awards	Best Independent Game	Won	
2014	2014 Game Critics Awards	Special Commendation for Innovation	Won	
2015	2015 Game Critics Awards	Best Independent Game	Won	
2015	The Game Awards 2015	Most Anticipated Game	Won	
2016	2016 Golden Joystick Awards	Best Original Game	Nominated	
2016	2016 Golden Joystick Awards	Best Visual Design	Nominated	
2016	2016 Golden Joystick Awards	Best Audio	Nominated	
2016	2016 Golden Joystick Awards	Best Indie Game	Nominated	
2016	2016 Golden Joystick Awards	Innovation of the Year	Nominated	
2016	2016 Golden Joystick Awards	PlayStation Game of the Year	Nominated	
2016	2016 Golden Joystick Awards	Game of the Year	Nominated	
2017	2017 New York Game Awards	Tin Pan Alley Award for Best Music in a Game	Nominated	
2017	20th Annual D.I.C.E. Awards	Outstanding Technical Achievement	Nominated	
2017	17th Game Developers Choice Awards	Innovation Award	Won	
2017	17th Game Developers Choice Awards	Best Technology	Nominated	
2017	2017 SXSW Gaming Awards	Excellence in Technical Achievement	Nominated	
2017	13th British Academy Games Awards	British Game	Nominated	
2018	2018 Golden Joystick Awards	Best Co-operative Game	Nominated	
2018	2018 Golden Joystick Awards	Xbox Game of the Year	Nominated	
2018	The Game Awards 2018	Best Ongoing Game	Nominated	
2018	2018 Steam Awards	Labor of Love	Nominated	
2019	2019 SXSW Gaming Awards	Most Evolved Game	Won	
2019	Italian Video Game Awards	Best Evolving Game	Nominated	
2019	2019 Golden Joystick Awards	Best Game Expansion	Nominated	
2019	2019 Golden Joystick Awards	Best VR/AR Game	Nominated	
2019	The Game Awards 2019	Best VR/AR Game	Nominated	
2020	2020 SXSW Gaming Awards	XR Game of the Year	Won	
2020	16th British Academy Games Awards	Evolving Game	Nominated	
2020	2020 Golden Joystick Awards	Best Game Expansion	Won	
2020	The Game Awards 2020	Best Ongoing Game	Won	
2020	2020 Steam Awards	Labor of Love	Nominated	
2021	17th British Academy Games Awards	Evolving Game	Nominated	
2021	2021 Golden Joystick Awards	Best Game Community	Nominated	
2021	The Game Awards 2021	Best Community Support	Nominated	
2021	2021 Steam Awards	Labor of Love	Nominated	
2022	18th British Academy Games Awards	Evolving Game	Won	
2022	2022 Golden Joystick Awards	Best Game Community	Nominated	
2022	The Game Awards 2022	Best Community Support	Nominated	
2022	2022 Steam Awards	Labor of Love	Nominated	
2023	19th British Academy Games Awards	Evolving Game	Nominated	
2023	2023 Golden Joystick Awards	Still Playing Award	Won	
2023	The Game Awards 2023	Best Community Support	Nominated	
2024	20th British Academy Games Awards	Evolving Game	Nominated	
2024	The Game Awards 2024	Best Community Support	Nominated	
2024	2024 Steam Awards	Labor of Love	Nominated	
2025	21st British Academy Games Awards	Evolving Game	Nominated	
2025	2025 Golden Joystick Awards	Best Game Expansion	Nominated	
2025	The Game Awards 2025	Best Ongoing Game	Won	
2025	The Game Awards 2025	Best Community Support	Nominated	
2025	2025 Steam Awards	Labor of Love Award	Nominated	
2026	22nd British Academy Games Awards	Evolving Game	Won	
2026	2026 Golden Joystick Awards	Still Playing Award (PC & Console)	Nominated	
2026	The Game Awards 2026	Best Ongoing Game	Pending	
2026	The Game Awards 2026	Best Community Support	Pending	

=== Player community ===
Due to the open-ended nature of the game, players have worked in-game and through online communities to create an in-game system of planets with bases and other features called the Galactic Hub as early as 2016, working to overcome the initial lack of multiplayer features in the game. The players in the Hub have worked to catalog planets and their features within its local area, thus allowing players to use this information to plan resource gathering and trade routes, and once multiplayer features were added, creating interconnected colonies using the game's base-building tools. The Hub has its own form of governance called the Galactic Council to guide how the Hub should expand, particularly after major game patches that render changes to planets, as well as an in-game cryptocurrency called Hubcoin, which is operated by the experimental testnet of Ethereum and has no true monetary value but can be traded in for in-game resources, and intended to be used to pay players for custom bases and other such features.

== Backlash over marketing ==
Since its reveal at the 2013 VGX show and over the course of its development, the potential of No Man's Sky had been widely promoted across the video game industry and created a great deal of hype. Matt Kamen of Wired UK called No Man's Sky "perhaps one of, if not the, most hyped indie titles in the history of gaming". Much of the attention has been drawn to the massive scope realised by the procedural generation of the game, and the relatively small size of the Hello Games's team behind it. No Man's Sky was seen as a potential industry-changing title, challenging the status quo of triple-A game development, which, according to Peckham, had become "rich and complacent". The game had been considered to have similar potential to affect the game industry as Minecraft, though in contrast, The Atlantic's David Sims opined that Minecraft's relevance took several years to develop, while No Man's Sky was burdened with expectations from the start. No Man's Sky has been considered by Nathan Lawrence of IGN as a mainstream-friendly space flight simulator game, providing controls that were "simple to learn and fascinating to plumb" compared to Elite Dangerous and Star Citizen while still offering engaging gameplay.

=== During development ===
The concepts behind No Man's Sky, allowing for a "grail-like feedback loop" around the exploration of near-infinite space according to Time's Matt Peckham, created a great amount of anticipation for the game from gamers, as such lofty goals were often seen as a dare for them to challenge. In a specific example, Hello Games had first claimed their system would achieve 4.3 billion planets (2^{32}) through the use of a 32-bit key; when players expressed doubt that this scope could be done, Hello Games altered their approach to use a 64-bit number as to create 18 quintillion planets to prove otherwise. Many commentators compared No Man's Sky to 2008's Spore by Maxis, which had promised similar ambitions to use procedural generation to construct new creatures and worlds. However, by Spore's release, the extent of the use of procedural generation was scaled back during the course of production, and the resulting game was not as well-received as anticipated. Murray was aware that some critics were applying caution to their view of No Man's Sky due to their previous experiences with Spore.

Kris Graft for Gamasutra commented that many players and journalists had lofty expectations for the game, with some believing that it would be, among other aspects, the "best space sim", the "best multiplayer action shooter", and the "best pure exploration game". Ars Technica's Kyle Orland found that, unlike with the developers of Spore or Fable- games promoted with "saturation PR campaigns that promised revolutionary and industry-changing gameplay features" which failed to appear in final releases- Hello Games's statements about No Man's Sky were "relatively restrained and realistic about what they were promising". Orland surmises that many players and journalists "layer[ed] their own expectations onto the game's gaps" from what Hello Games actually claimed. Vlambeer's founder Rami Ismail regarded the framing of concepts like magnitude and scale rather than absolutes "a little masterclass in explaining an abstract concept to the largest possible audience" by the marketing campaign of Hello Games and Sony; Polygon's Ben Kuchera agreed on this point, but considered that the marketing may have gotten away from Sony and Hello Games, since players did not have a concrete understanding of the game's limitations prior to launch. Murray himself was aware of the "unrealistic, intangible level of excitement" that fans had of the game and given that they had been waiting three years to play it, would be expecting it to be perfect. He countered that he felt he and Hello Games tried to be "reasonably open and honest about what the game is" all throughout the marketing cycle to set expectations. On the day before the official release, Murray cautioned players that No Man's Sky may not have been "the game you imagined from those trailers" and instead that the title was meant as a "very very chill game", giving players a universe-sized sandbox that makes you feel as if you "stepped into a sci-fi book cover"; Murray believed the game would have a "super divisive" response from players due to some of these expectations.

No Man's Sky developed a dedicated fan-base before its release, with many congregating in a subreddit to track and share information published about the game. Sam Zucchi writing for Kill Screen proposed that the players anxiously awaiting No Man's Sky were a kind of religion, putting faith in Hello Games to be able deliver an experience that has otherwise never been offered by video games before, the ability to explore a near-infinite universe.

Following the news of the game's delay from June to August 2016, Murray, along with Kotaku writer Jason Schreier, who first reported on the rumour of the delay, received a number of death threats in response, which Murray publicly responded to in good humour. The situation was seen by other journalists as a growing issue between the prerelease hype created by marketing for video games, and the excited nature of the fans of these games even before their release. New Statesman's Phil Hartup considered that when marketing for a game drives a need for any type of news by those anxious to play the game, disappointing news such as delays could readily lead to online fans reacting in a paranoid manner against marketing expectations. Phil Owen writing for TheWrap blamed such issues on the video game marketers, as the field had become less about selling a game and more about creating a cult-like following for the game and "weaponizing fandom".

=== At release ===
In addition to its mixed response from critics, player reaction to the release version of No Man's Sky was generally negative in response to several issues at the game's launch, buoyed by early reactions from those that had played the game before its official release. Users expressed concern with the apparent lack of features and other issues associated with the PlayStation 4 launch, while many players on the Windows version via Steam and GOG.com gave the game negative reviews due to the poor graphics capabilities or inability to launch the game. Players were also disappointed at the apparent lack of features that Hello Games and Sony had stated in earlier announcements and interviews would be included in the game; a list initially compiled by members of the No Man's Sky subreddit consisting of all such features appeared around a week after launch. By October 2016, the game had one of the worst user-based ratings on Steam, with an aggregate "mostly negative" average from more than 70,000 users. At the 2017 Game Developers Conference, Murray admitted they have far underestimated the number of players that would initially get the game; using estimates from Inside and Far Cry: Primal, both released just before No Man's Sky, the studio had expected about 10,000 concurrent players at launch, but in actuality saw over 500,000 players across both PlayStation 4 and Windows, with about half coming from the Windows side. This overwhelmed their expected server capacity and overloaded their support team with bug reports and technical help, leading to the noted problems with communications within the release window. At the same event, Hello Games announced that they had started their own support programme, known as "Hello Labs", which will help fund and support the developers of games using procedural generation, or otherwise experimental gameplay. Murray stated they anticipate funding one or two games at a time, and that one title was already part of the programme at the time of announcement.

One of the more significant features that appeared to be absent from the release version of No Man's Sky was its multiplayer capabilities. Hello Games had stated during development that No Man's Sky would include multiplayer elements, though the implementation would be far from traditional methods as one would see in a massively multiplayer online game, to the point where Murray has told players to not think of No Man's Sky as a multiplayer game. Because of the size of the game's universe, Sean Murray estimated that more than 99.9% of the planets would never be explored by players, and that the chance of meeting other players through chance encounters would be "incredibly slim". Murray had stated in a 2014 interview that No Man's Sky would include a matchmaking system that is similar to that used for Journey when such encounters do occur; each online player would have an "open lobby" that any players in their in-universe proximity would enter and leave. This approach was envisioned to provide "cool moments" for players as they encounter each other, but not meant to support gameplay like player versus environment or fully cooperative modes. According to Murray in 2018, Hello Games had worked to try to keep this light multiplayer element in the game through the final part of their development cycle, but found that it was very difficult to include, and opted to remove it for the game's release, believing that with the size of the game's universe, only a few players would end up experiencing it.

Questions regarding the multiplayer aspects of No Man's Sky were raised a day following the official release on the PlayStation 4. Two players attempted to meet at a location in the game's virtual universe after one player recognised the other upon seeing their username attached to a planetary discovery. Despite confirming they had been at the same spot on the same planet outside of the game through their respective Twitch streams, they could not see each other. Furthering this was the discovery that European copies of the limited edition packaging used a sticker to cover the PEGI online play icon. Journalists noted a number of potential reasons why the players may not have encountered each other, including the users being on separate instances or server problems reported by Hello Games at launch, though some opined that this may have been a feature removed before launch. Hello Games noted that they have had "far more" players than they expected at launch and are bringing on more people to help support the game along with patching the critical issues at the game's launch, but they had not made a direct statement on the multiplayer situation as of September 2016.

Outside of patch notes, Hello Games had effectively gone silent on social media right after the game's release up until the announcement of the Foundation update in late November 2016. Murray, who used the Hello Games's Twitter account with some frequency before release, had not been visible online for the first two months following the game's release. In the announcement of this update, Hello Games admitted to being "quiet" but have been paying attention to the various criticisms levelled at the game. Schreier from Kotaku and Ben Kuchera of Polygon commented that some of the negative player reaction was due to a lack of clarification on these apparently missing features from either Hello Games or Sony in the weeks just after release, with Kuchera further stating that with the silence from either company, "the loudest, most negative voices are shouting unopposed" and leading to a strong negative perception of the game. Kuchera later wrote that many of the issues in the lead-up and follow-up to No Man's Sky's release, whether by choice or happenstance, provide many lessons on the importance of proper public relations. Kuchera specifically pointed to the decision to withhold review copies and an apparent lack of public relations (PR) to manage statements relating to what features would be in the game. Kuchera also noted that many people had taken the hype generated by the press only to be disappointed by the final game and that consumers did have ways to evaluate the game following its release before they purchased the title. Sony president Shuhei Yoshida admitted that Hello Games did not have "a great PR strategy" for No Man's Sky, in part for lacking a dedicated PR staff to manage expectations, but still support the developers as they continue to patch and update the game. Jesse Signal, writing for the Boston Globe noted that some of the hype for No Man's Sky may be attributed to game journalists themselves for getting too excited about the game, positing "Had journalists asked certain questions at certain times, perhaps it would have been more difficult for Hello Games to make promises it couldn't deliver on." Murray himself stated in a 2019 interview that prior to the game's release, much of their contact was with journalists who Hello Games believed understood the nature of video game development, and thus expected their statements about what No Man's Sky would be tempered to reflect the reality of Hello Games being a small team with limited time. Instead, Murray found that the press took their words for granted, and created expectations for players that they could not have met at launch. As a result, Hello Games has since switched to communicating directly with the community rather than the press and keeping only to patch updates or near-release features to keep expectations in check.

The lack of features in the release version of the game became a point of contention, with many players using the Steam and GOG.com review pages, along with Metacritic reviews, to give it poor ratings. Sean Murray received a great deal of online criticism from players, including accusations of lying. A Reddit user temporarily took down the documented list of removed features after he received messages that congratulated him on "really sticking it to these 'dirtbag' devs", which was not his intention in publishing the list; he wanted no part of the anger towards Hello Games. The subreddit forum had become hostile due to a lack of updates from Hello Games or Sony, leading one moderator to shutting down the subreddit due to the toxicity of the comments, later undoing that action on further review.

In an interview in July 2018, Murray stated that the period following No Man's Sky' release was difficult for him and the studio due to the backlash that included numerous death and bomb threats during that period that forced the studio to be in constant contact with Scotland Yard. Murray stated of that period, "I find it really personal, and I don't have any advice for dealing with it." The Hello Games's Twitter account had been hacked into in October 2016 and used to post the message "No Man's Sky was a mistake" among other tweets before the companies regained control of it, leading to confusion and additional drama within the community. Users sought refunds for the game via both Sony and Valve outside of the normal time allowance for claiming such refunds by their policies, citing the numerous bugs within the game and/or the lack of features, and while some players claim to have received such refunds, both companies have reemphasised their refund policies in response to the volume of refund requests.

Game journalist Geoff Keighley, who had been in discussions with Murray and Hello Games throughout the development, had expressed concern to Murray in the year leading up to its release, according to Keighley in September 2016. He said he was "internally conflicted" about the state of the game near its release, recognising that many of the features that Murray had been talking about were not going to make it, and compared Murray to Peter Molyneux who had overpromised on a vision for his games that ultimately fell short. Keighley had expressed to Murray his concern that the $60 price tag was a bit steep for the current state of the game and recommended that they take an early access approach instead. According to Keighley, Murray said he didn't want to be around Keighley anymore as he was "a little too negative about the game and [Keighley]'s assessment of where the team was at". Keighley felt that Murray could not "rip off that band-aid" and explain exactly what had made it and had to be cut for the game prior to release, and in the end, appeared to "disrespect his audience". As such, Keighley sympathised with those that felt they were misled by the marketing. Keighley rekindled the relationship with Murray since launch, and anticipated discussing more of what happened near release with him. Sony chairman Shawn Layden, in November 2016, stated that Hello Games had an "incredible vision" and a "very huge ambition" for No Man's Sky, and that the developers are still working to update the game to bring it to what they wanted, adding that "sometimes you just don't get all the way there at the first go". Layden further expressed that from Sony's side, they recognised that they "don't want to stifle ambition" and force a specific style of play onto their games.

In September 2016, the Advertising Standards Authority (ASA) of the United Kingdom, following on "several complaints", began an investigation into the promotion of No Man's Sky. The ASA has the authority to require publishers to remove offending advertising materials if they are found in violation of ASA standards. In the No Man's Sky complaints directed at Hello Games and Valve, the ASA specifically evaluated materials used on the Steam store page to promote the game that demonstrates features that do not appear to be a part of the final game but have also reviewed other official promotional outlets including the game's official YouTube channel. Several game industry lawyers, speaking to PC Gamer, noted that while the ASA has successfully taken action in previous cases of false advertising, demonstrating such for a procedurally generated game of No Man's Sky scope may be difficult since it is impossible to play the entire game to prove something does not exist. The lawyers also noted that most of what Murray and other Hello Games members said outside of any official promotional channels, such as interviews or through social media, cannot be taken as part of the game's advertising, further limiting the claims that the ASA can act on. The ASA ruled in November 2016 that the Steam storepage advertising of No Man's Sky was not in breach of their standards, attributing the used footage and screenshots to be reasonably representative of the average player's experience with a procedurally generated game, and dismissed the submitted complaints; the ASA further ruled that as Valve has no control over what Hello Games included on the store page, they were not liable for the material either.

=== Subsequent updates ===
On 25 November 2016, Hello Games announced it was planning on bringing a large update, known as the "Foundation" Update, to the game, stating that "We have been quiet, but we are listening and focusing on improving the game that our team loves and feels so passionately about." Hello Games had not mentioned a release window, and many journalists were surprised when the update was released just two days later. The update was generally well received by journalists, that while not fully satisfying all the features that seemed to have been promised for the game, helped to push the game into the right direction in anticipation of future major patches. The update had drawn back some players that had previously turned their back on the game and created a better reception from some players, while others still remained disappointed by the game's initial release problems. The second major update, "Path Finder", was released in March 2017. By the time of the third major update, "Atlas Rises", a year after its initial release, many felt the game was now much better and approaching what they had expected. Wired's Julie Muncy said that the ability of the updates to No Man's Sky demonstrates the game can be more organic, adding significant new features that can dramatically change the feel of the game.

Following the first patch, journalists generally commended Hello Games for staying quiet about the exact details of the update until just prior to its release to avoid the same situation that the game fell into upon its initial release. To avoid any repeat of the mistakes from the game's launch, nearly all subsequent major updates were only preannounced by Murray tweeting an emoji that hinted at the contents of the update two or three days before the update was released, allowing the game's community to get hyped up without drawing out their anticipation. Gamasutra named Hello Games one of its top ten developers for 2016 not only for the technical achievements within No Man's Sky, but also for not collapsing amid the anger directed at the company and instead continuing to make improvements to the game. The continued free improvements to No Man's Sky have been considered a redemption for Hello Games and the game's launch by several outlets. By the time of its five-year anniversary, No Man's Sky's user reviews on Steam had swung to "mostly positive" after initially starting at "overwhelmingly negative" at the time of its release, and reached 'very positive', representing 80% or more positive reviews, eight years from launch. At the five-year anniversary and after it, journalists from websites such as IGN, TechRadar, and TheGamer started to report on the game as one of the greatest redemption arcs in gaming.

=== Influence ===
The discrepancy between No Man's Sky's expectations and its initially released product are considered a milestone in video game promotion, with many sources considering how to properly promote a game in a "post-No Man's Sky world". The situation around the game's promotion using screenshots and videos that were not from its final state, a practice known as "bullshotting", led to discussion among developers, publishers, and journalists of how to best showcase upcoming games without being deceptive to the audience. Keighley, who felt some responsibility for the No Man's Sky situation, announced that all games that would be shown at The Game Awards 2016 would be more focused on gameplay of near-completed games using a Let's Play-type format rather than allowing for scripted or pre-rendered videos. Several journalists attribute a change in Valve's Steam storefront policies in November 2016, requiring all game screenshots and videos to be from the final product, as a response to No Man's Sky.

The failure of No Man's Sky's promotional aspects has affected other space simulation and open world games that are based on the premise of providing a vast ranging sandbox for players, as players have become wary of the broad claims that these games might make. Novaquark, the developers of the upcoming open-world Dual Universe, found themselves struggling to complete their Kickstarter funding in the months immediately after No Man's Sky's release, but have recognised the need to be open and transparent to potential funders on what the game will and will not have. Fenix Fire, the developers of the space exploration game Osiris: New Dawn, used the various question-and-answers that Sean Murray had to handle during the prerelease period to gauge what players were looking for in such games and guide development of their own game. According to a report from Kotaku, BioWare had envisioned that Mass Effect: Andromeda would use procedural generation for creating a universe to explore prior to No Man's Sky's announcement, and further pushed for this following the excitement for No Man's Sky once it was announced, but could not get the procedural generation to work well with the Frostbite 3 game engine, and had to scrap these plans by 2015.

Eurogamer's Wesley Yin-Poole observed that following No Man's Sky's problematic release, developers appear to be "keeping their cards close to their chests for fear of failing to deliver on a promise that never should have slipped out in the first place"; as an example, he stated that Rare's Sea of Thieves, whereas having only been promoted through obscure videos that left too many questions to potential players in its earlier stages, has started an "Insider" programme in December 2016 to provide limited alpha-testing access and more concrete gameplay videos. Similarly, Compulsion Games, who premiered their game We Happy Few at PAX East 2015 to similar hype as No Man's Sky, worked to backtrack on perceived expectations of their game after seeing what had happened to No Man's Sky at its launch. Specifically, Compulsion, a small developer, found that many were treating their game as a AAA release, and wanted to be clear what the game was to be, deciding to use the early access approach to provide transparency.
