= Hello Games =

British video game developer

Hello Games Ltd
- Hello Games' logo introduced with No Man's Sky
- Type: Private
- Industry: Video games
- Founded: February 2008; 18 years ago
- Founders: Sean Murray; Grant Duncan; Ryan Doyle; David Ream
- Headquarters: Guildford, United Kingdom
- Key people: Sean Murray (managing director)
- Products: Joe Danger series; No Man's Sky; The Last Campfire; Light No Fire
- Revenue: ▼£28.07 million (2023)
- Operating income: ▼£18.03 million (2023)
- Net income: ▼£20.85 million (2023)
- Total assets: ▲£145.19 million (2022)
- Total equity: ▲£136.11 million (2022)
- Number of employees: 50 (2023)
- Parent: Hello Games Holdings
- Subsidiaries: Hello Labs
- Website: hellogames.org

Hello Games Ltd is a British video game company based in Guildford, Surrey. The company was founded by Sean Murray, Grant Duncan, Ryan Doyle and David Ream in February 2008 (incorporated on 4 August 2008) and has developed the Joe Danger series, No Man's Sky, The Last Campfire, and the upcoming Light No Fire.

== History ==
=== Founding and Joe Danger ===
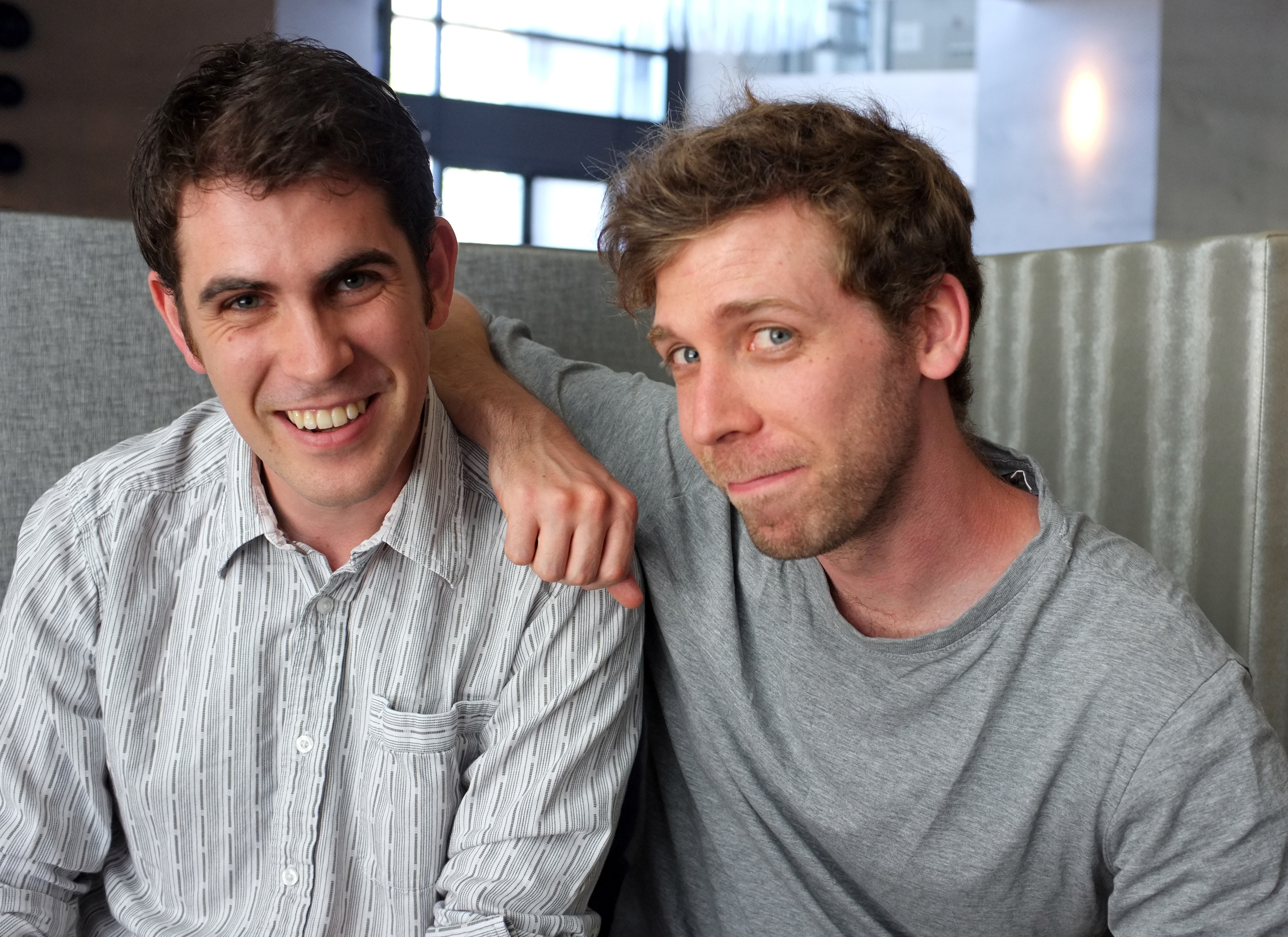
Co-founders Sean Murray (left) and Grant Duncan

Hello Games was founded in February 2008 by Sean Murray and Grant Duncan, together with friends Ryan Doyle and David Ream. Murray had been a developer at Electronic Arts prior and had grown tired of developing repeated sequels, and decided to leave to form his own studio to make a game he always wanted to make, Joe Danger, which was the studio's first release in 2010. At the 2010 Develop Awards, they won two awards: Best New Studio and Best Micro Studio. In September 2010, they were listed by The Guardian as one of the 100 most innovative and creative British companies of the previous 12 months. The popularity and success of Joe Danger led them to develop a sequel, Joe Danger 2: The Movie.

=== No Man's Sky ===
Murray said that coming back to do a sequel after having left Electronic Arts from doing sequels led to a mid-life crisis for himself, and gave rise for the idea of No Man's Sky, inspired by science fiction of the 1980s, with an entire universe of over 18 quintillion planets created through procedural generation. Developed by only a small four-person team led by Murray, No Man's Sky, was revealed at the VGX 2013 award show and generated a large amount of hype for the game. On 24 December 2013, the studio's offices were flooded after a nearby river broke its bank, with much of the hardware used in the development of the game being destroyed, but they were able to recover most of their projects' code and were able to relocate.

The media continued to build excitement for No Man's Sky, furthered by Sony Interactive Entertainment obtaining publishing rights for it on the PlayStation 4. However, the game was launched a few months late, and players found soon after launch many of the features in the game that had been seemingly promised in early media were absent such as multiplayer functions. Hello Games had also gone silent save for technical support. Hello Games was accused of dishonesty surrounding their promotion of the game, and the subsequent lack of promised features, but which Murray explained in later interviews that they failed to control the hype being generated by the media nor setting expectations for players of what the game would be like at launch and how they would develop it over time. Since the launch, many of these missing features were added via numerous free post-release updates as well as new features including support for virtual reality and cross-platform play across multiple consoles, leading to the studio being praised for staying true to their vision of the game.

=== Post-No Man's Sky ===
In 2017, the studio announced an initiative to fund multiple experimental and procedural generation projects based on their work in No Man's Sky called Hello Labs. At The Game Awards 2018, Hello Games announced The Last Campfire, a game developed by three employees, that was released in August 2020.

In September 2020, Murray said that while some of the staff were still working on continued updates for No Man's Sky, the remaining staff were working on a new game, but to avoid the issues around No Man's Sky's launch hype, he planned to keep specifics of the game quiet. Murray said in April 2022 of the game, still in its early stages, "it's the kind of project that even if we had a thousand people working on it, it'd still seem impossible".

At The Game Awards 2023 in December, Murray introduced Light No Fire, another exploration and survival game like No Man's Sky based around procedural generation. However, instead of multiple worlds, Light No Fire was focused on one singular world all players would participate in, which Murray said was a "truly open world" that was "bigger than the Earth", with more realistic features and denser content than the planets generated by No Man's Sky. Murray said Light No Fire was "something more ambitious" than No Man's Sky. While Murray's announcement of Light No Fire was seen to mimic how No Man's Sky was announced and the subsequent hype that it generated that led to its poorly-received launch, commentators believe that Hello Games is more mature and will better temper expectations, with Murray using social media to joke with players about overhyping Light No Fire.

In December 2024, Hello Games announced that they will be publishing Stage Fright, a cooperative game developed by Ghost Town Games.

== Games developed ==
Year	Title	Platform(s)
2010	Joe Danger	Android, iOS, PlayStation 3, PlayStation Vita, Windows, Xbox 360
2012	Joe Danger 2: The Movie	Linux, macOS, PlayStation 3, PlayStation Vita, Windows, Xbox 360
2014	Joe Danger Infinity	iOS
2016	No Man's Sky	macOS, Nintendo Switch, Nintendo Switch 2, PlayStation 4, PlayStation 5, Windows, Xbox One, Xbox Series X/S
2020	The Last Campfire	iOS, macOS, Nintendo Switch, PlayStation 4, Windows, Xbox One
TBA	Light No Fire	TBA

== Games published ==
Year	Title	Developer	Platform(s)
2027	Stage Fright	Ghost Town Games	Nintendo Switch, Nintendo Switch 2, Windows
