= Joe Danger =

2010 video game

- Joe Danger in front of the game's logo
- Developer: Hello Games
- Publisher: Hello Games
- Director: David Ream
- Designer: Sean Murray
- Programmer: Ryan Doyle
- Artist: Grant Duncan
- Series: Joe Danger
- Platforms: PlayStation 3, Xbox 360, Windows, iOS, Android, PlayStation Vita
- Release: 8 June 2010: PlayStation 3; NA: 8 June 2010; EU: 9 June 2010 Xbox 360 14 December 2011 iOS 10 January 2013 Windows 24 June 2013 PlayStation Vita; NA: 2 September 2014; EU: 3 September 2014
- Genres: Racing, platform
- Modes: Single-player, multiplayer

Joe Danger is a 2010 racing game developed and published by British studio Hello Games. In the platform game, the player controls the eponymous daredevil and navigates courses within a set amount of time, aiming to complete enough objectives to continue to further rounds.

Joe Danger was released for the PlayStation 3, via the PlayStation Network, in June 2010, after Hello Games originally chose to publish it exclusively with Sony Computer Entertainment. A "Special Edition" for the Xbox 360, via the Xbox Live Arcade, was released in December 2011, followed by an iOS spin off in January 2013 and a version for Android in April 2015.

Joe Danger received generally positive reviews; most reviewers praised the accessible gameplay and the ability to edit courses while playing them. Some suggested the game would have benefited from more options, such as sharing and rating user-generated content, and criticised the lack of an online multiplayer mode. Hello Games subsequently released downloadable content to add features that users and reviewers had requested in the months following the game's release. Using leaderboard statistics, Joe Danger was estimated to have sold at least 108,000 units in its first three months on sale. It was nominated for several awards, including the grand prize at the 2010 Independent Games Festival.

== Gameplay ==
The player controls the titular motorbike stuntman Joe Danger and guides him through ten trials to defeat his nemeses, the members of Team Nasty. The game uses elements of both racing and side-scrolling platform genres in which the protagonist can move to the right and, by reversing, to the left as well as hopping over and ducking under various obstacles. Although the game is based on a two-dimensional plane, some of its courses are designed with three layers accessible by changing lanes. The bike is controllable in the air, allowing various tricks to be performed, for which points are awarded with higher scores awarded for long trick sequences, and for manoeuvring onto targets. Executing a stunt will build a "boost meter", which is used to increases Joe's speed, but drains the meter. The Select button is used to teleport Joe back to the last checkpoint passed.

The boxing glove obstacle is representative of art director Grant Duncan's artwork and comic level design, the inspiration for which came from past jobs with Sega.

Joe Danger's level design was directly influenced by the Sonic the Hedgehog game series, as evidenced by the use of avoidable spikes, vertical loops, and springs placed in levels to allow higher jumps. Some elements are designed to hinder the player, such as conveyor belts, which slow the motorbike, oversized boxing gloves, which will propel the player backwards and barricades, which make it necessary to switch to an alternative lane.

The primary goal in each level is to collect as many "stars" as possible. A star is collected for completing an objective, and once enough are collected, the next course is unlocked. The player is free to choose which objectives to complete, with the option of replaying a level to earn more stars. The most common objective is to finish a course within a time limit with as many points as possible. Other level-specific objectives include collecting a series of coins, hidden stars or letters spelling "Danger", while in others the player is required to land on every target, or to complete a course in one continuous sequence of tricks. Later levels require the player to do more than one objective simultaneously.

Joe Danger contains a sandbox mode, which allows the player to drag and drop objects onto the course to customise levels. This mode is integrated into some single-player levels where the game may instruct the player to introduce obstacles such as ramps to access later sections. New levels can be shared online with friends via the PlayStation Network. The game has a split screen multiplayer mode for up to four players on a selection of specially-made tracks. There is leaderboard support, initially limited to those on the player's PlayStation Network friend list.

== Development ==
"Grant [Duncan, artist] had a box of toys he brought down from his attic. Something kind of beautiful happened when he brought those in. There was an instant power to demonstrating your latest game idea with Optimus Prime in your hands. I like to think we designed our next five games that first week, just setting up toys on the office floor."

— Sean Murray, managing director of Hello Games, on the conception of the project

Joe Danger arose from the team's wish to make "something that puts a smile on people's faces" similar to games such as Mario Kart and Micro Machines. An Evel Knievel toy was a main source of inspiration for the "Joe" character; the team had fun "firing that stunt cycle out of windows and down halls". Nevertheless, Murray likened work as an independent developer to "the reality of eating ice cream every day for every meal" as the novelty of working for themselves wore off. The team often spent more than 60 hours a week working on the project because of the "unrealistic" time scales for development and with only four team members, each had to fulfil several roles; they had no public relations representative nor did they have a business manager or a designer. No software design document was made throughout the production of Joe Danger, since the team felt they understood each other's ideas.

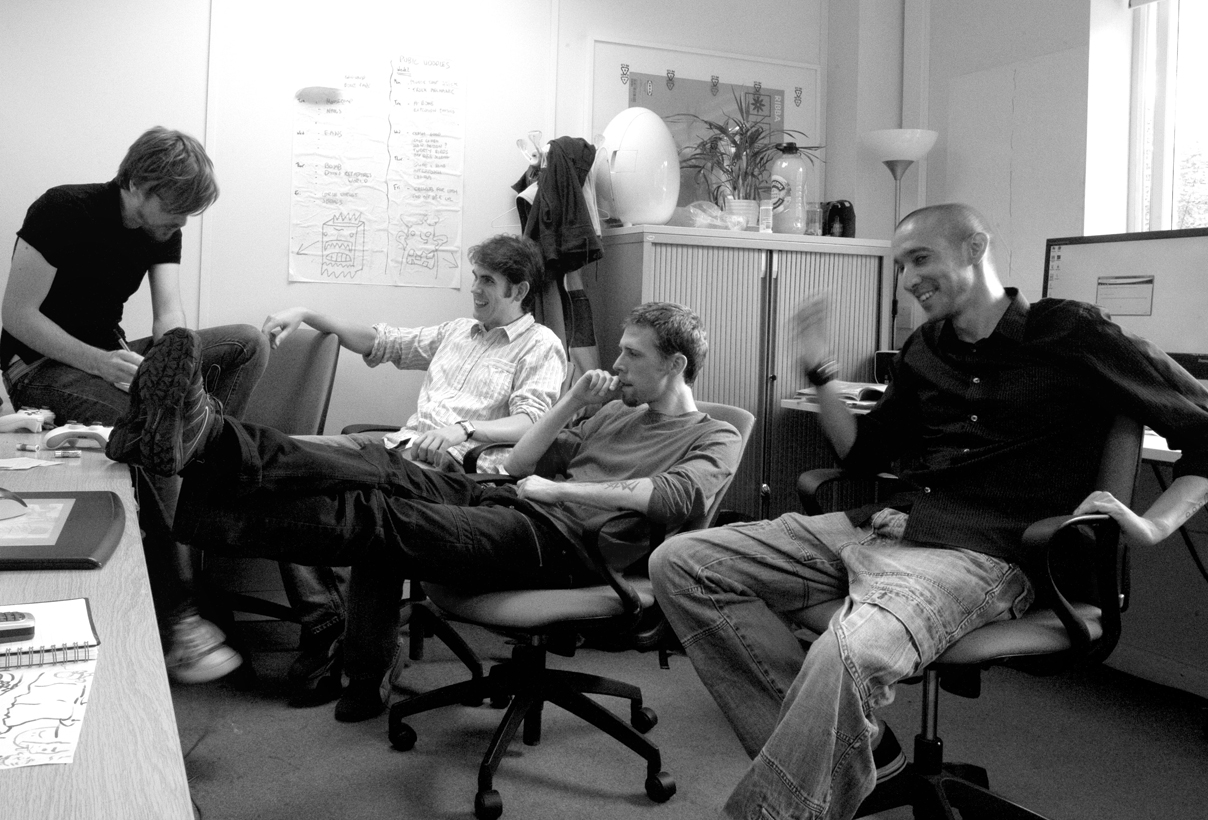
The staff of Hello Games in their office in Guildford. From left: David Ream, Sean Murray, Grant Duncan, and Ryan Doyle.

The game was announced on the developers' website on 23 September 2009 and given its first public showcase in November 2009 at the Eurogamer Expo in Earls Court. The team used this event as an opportunity for extensive playtesting, receiving feedback from those playing the game and creating new software builds for each day of the expo. Murray cited numerous "happy accidents" during development, which led to incorporation of various features into the end product. An example of this was a bug in the programming which enabled players to jump as often as they liked in mid-air; the team decided this was fun and incorporated it as a double jump.

Hello Games struggled to find a third-party publisher for the game. Some of the reasons include worries about the lack of potential for porting it to other platforms, and comments such as "collecting giant coins feels unrealistic to me", and "we want games that are less about fun right now". One prospective publisher intimated that they might have published the game if the main character had been a monkey. When players were invited to make suggestions for additional characters, there was popular support for the monkey idea; this led to the introduction of a downloadable bonus character, Chuckles the Chimp. After nine months looking for a publisher, the team ran out of money. Murray later came up with the idea of selling his home to help fund development. He explained to Jessica Conditt of Engadget that he considered the house "like a blood diamond", since it was paid for with money earned at his job with Electronic Arts.

== Release ==
After initially being unsure of the best platform on which to release Joe Danger, the developers announced in March 2010 that they would be releasing the game only on Sony's PlayStation 3. This decision enabled Hello to make use of Sony's "Publishing Fund", a scheme which offered advantageous financial terms in exchange for exclusivity. Murray said that the PlayStation Network was the ideal place to release the game because it was the only way they could publish by themselves and branded the Xbox Live Arcade platform a "slaughterhouse for small developers" due to poor sales figures for independent works. Joe Danger was released on 8 June 2010 in the North American PlayStation Store, with a European release the following day.

In October 2011, Eurogamer picked up on an Xbox Live Arcade listing for a Joe Danger: Special Edition on the Korea Media Rating Board. The project was officially announced on 3 November; a GameSpot-exclusive trailer was released the same day. Murray said that the Special Edition will include new gameplay modes and characters; another new addition is the "Laboratory" mode, in which the player must complete unique "developer challenges". The edition was released on 14 December 2011 and was exclusive to the Xbox 360. Murray stood by his earlier statements criticising Microsoft's platform; he said,

Obviously a comment like that isn't meant exactly how it sounds. For probably a few years XBLA was basically the only show in town. If you managed to get your game on there it was almost a guarantee of success. I don't think that's the case now. That isn't Microsoft's fault, and it isn't developers' fault. It's just that a hundred games come out there a year, and of those maybe ten break through and make an impact. The rest don't.

He stressed the decision to port the game "made business sense", and that the team "jumped at the chance without even thinking about the economics of it".

Since the release of Special Edition, a spin-off version for iOS and Android devices has been in development. The team decided not to directly adapt the original game for the new device; Murray told Mike Rose of Gamasutra that "simply porting a game is never something I could get excited about, it's soulless work". He explained that the team's aim is to create a game with similar graphics to a console game, while also keeping the frame rate at 60 frames per second. The game is being co-developed by Steven Burgess, who previously worked on WiiWare game LostWinds with Frontier Developments. It was given its first public showcase at the Penny Arcade Expo in Boston, Massachusetts, on 7 April. The iOS version, titled Joe Danger Touch, was listed on the iTunes Store on 10 January 2013.

A version of the game for the PlayStation Vita was announced on 27 August 2014, containing both levels from the original game and levels exclusive to the PlayStation Vita. It was made available for free on the PlayStation Plus Instant Game Collection service in September 2014. There are 25 playable characters available in the game, as well as a modified level editor.

=== Downloadable content ===
Since the game's initial release, additional downloadable content has been made available. The first patch for the game, dubbed "The People's Patch", was released in August 2010 adding two features: the ability to upload video replays to YouTube and the ability to share customised courses with those not on the player's friends list. Their absence had been the source of early criticism by reviewers. Other additional features included custom soundtracks, new levels, and alternative costumes. The announcement of the game's expansion coincided with a level-designing competition in which the top five contestants won T-shirts and artwork. Murray said Hello were trying to respond to all suggestions from users, and that they would release a patch addressing "every concern we could". In November 2010, the team announced four new playable characters, each with a unique appearance and range of moves.

=== 2022 re-release ===
The game was re-released on 27 January 2022 after Hello Games received an email from the father of an autistic child, explaining how the game had become an enabling mechanism for his son's social interaction and a coping and reward mechanism for stressful situations and adding that due to changes to Apple's iOS operating system, the game would no longer run on modern devices. Hello Games said the message "broke [their] hearts and made [them] want to set things right", so they rebuilt the game as a hobby project and upgraded the eight year old game to modern technology.

== Reception ==
=== Critical ===
Reception

Aggregate score
Aggregator	Score
Metacritic	86/100

Review scores
Publication	Score
1Up.com	B+
Eurogamer	8/10
Game Informer	9/10
IGN	9.5/10

The single-player gameplay mode of Joe Danger was generally well received by critics. The game's accessibility was a source of praise; according to Eric Neigher of 1UP.com, it allows for "five-minute sprints" of gameplay, although more in-depth options take up more time. IGN's Daemon Hatfield compared the game favourably to Nintendo Entertainment System launch title Excitebike, and said that Joe Danger felt like a Nintendo game. Other critics focused on similarities to Super Mario Bros., such as non-linear level progression (the ability to play levels in any order, providing that the player has earned enough stars to "unlock" the level), the encouragement to play through multiple times to complete every objective, and the use of platforms. Another influences noted with favour by critics was the combo system, which some compared with the Tony Hawk's series of skateboarding games. Comments were also made on the influence of early Sonic the Hedgehog titles. The cheerful, cartoon-like nature of Joe Danger's artwork was well received; Eurogamer's Tom Bramwell said "I've worked on games websites for over a decade and not enough games are happy and colourful. This one is. More of this, please, everyone."

Opinions were less uniformly complimentary about other modes of the game. Scott Alan Marriott of G4 TV was disappointed with the shortage of options in multiplayer modes, in particular the inability to play against others online. The game's leaderboard feature was another source of criticism, with several reviewers noting severe lag issues. The Daily Telegraph's Martin Gaston said "it would also have been nice to see the game give dedicated players the opportunity to study from the world's finest by implementing online replays", an option not originally included; the decision not to allow sharing custom courses with users outside the player's friend's list was labelled "questionable" and "obtuse". Minor criticisms related to the lack of variety in sound design and background scenery. Two months after the initial release, Hello Games' first patch for Joe Danger contained features to cover most critics' concerns.

Before its release, Joe Danger was up for the "Seumas McNally Grand Prize" and for the "Technical Excellence" award at the 2010 Independent Games Festival at the Game Developers Conference, losing to Monaco: What's Yours Is Mine and Limbo respectively. The game was unsuccessfully nominated for the "Best New Download IP" award at the same year's Develop Industry Excellence Awards in Brighton, instead winning the studio the "Best New Studio" and "Micro Studio" awards. It received a nomination for "Best PlayStation Network Exclusive Game" at the PlayStation Network Gamers' Choice Awards in March 2011 but was beaten by Dead Nation; it appeared in the "Best Downloadable Game" category at GamesMaster's Golden Joystick Awards in September 2011, but missed out to Minecraft. The same month, Play placed it top of its "50 Best PSN Games" feature, ahead of titles such as Braid and The Last Guy.

=== Commercial ===
Joe Danger sold over 50,000 units in its first week on sale on the PlayStation Network. The team announced at the Develop Conference 2010 that they broke even on the day of release. Based on research published by Gamasutra's Ryan Langley, who used the number of unique entries on a game's online leaderboard to estimate the number of sales, it sold more than 68,000 units in its first month of release. In July, the same statistics indicated a further 24,000 units had been sold, bringing the two-month total to over 92,000. The next month saw at least 16,000 new players. Exact sales figures are uncertain because only a limited number of scores can be held within a leaderboard for PlayStation Network games, but on the basis of these numbers the game sold at least 108,000 units in its first three months. Murray said that as Joe Danger does not allow scores of zero to make the leaderboards, the true quantity sold was likely to be substantially higher than indicated. In December 2011, PlayStation Network's senior director Susan Panico named Joe Danger the year's third best-selling game to be supported by Sony's Publishing Fund behind Hoard and Tales from Space: About a Blob.

Sales for the Xbox Live Arcade version were less impressive; Langley's statistics indicate that 8,300 units sold in the first week, and by December's end that figure rested at around 16,800. At least 6,800 further sales were noted with the same technique in January 2012, and by March the overall figure was thought to be least 37,500 units.

== Sequel ==
After Joe Danger's release, Hello Games advertised job positions on their website, indicating that work was proceeding on a new project. New staff were hired, and towards the end of the year, the organisation moved its offices. After an announcement on their website a week prior, Joe Danger: The Movie was presented for the first time at Gamescom in Cologne in August 2011. Murray said the game is "kind of" a sequel to Joe Danger, and he envisioned it was big enough to dwarf the original. Named Joe Danger 2: The Movie, the game was released on 14 September 2012 and was the last of Hello Games' projects to be based around the character.
