= God of Rock =

- Developer: Modus Studios Brazil
- Publisher: Modus Games
- Platforms: Nintendo Switch; PlayStation 4; PlayStation 5; Windows; Xbox One; Xbox Series X/S
- Release: WW: April 18, 2023
- Genres: Rhythm, fighting
- Modes: Single-player, multiplayer

God of Rock is a video game developed by Modus Studios Brazil and published by Modus Games. It combines gameplay from rhythm games and fighting games.

== Gameplay ==
Players control combatants in tournaments, as in fighting games. Instead of complex moves that must be memorized, players must time their inputs according to music, as in rhythm games. If both players' inputs are perfectly timed, they block each others' attacks. They can also do special moves, which allow them to heal themselves or alter their opponent's music. These special attacks can be countered with one's own special moves. The rhythm component becomes more difficult as time goes on. God of Rock has online multiplayer.

== Development ==
Modus Games released it for Nintendo Switch, PlayStation 4 and 5, Windows, and Xbox One and Series X/S on April 18, 2023.

== Reception ==
God of Rock received mixed reviews on Metacritic. Fellow review aggregator OpenCritic assessed that the game received weak approval, being recommended by 14% of critics. Though intrigued by the idea of combing the two genres, PC Gamer said that it would be difficult to do well, and God of Rock's implementation is "mostly frustrating or uninteresting". Push Square enjoyed the additional strategy of the special moves, which they likened to the Street Fighter or Mortal Kombat series. They said the single player can eventually easy and recommended the game for its online multiplayer. Though TouchArcade praised the effort put into the game, they felt the fusion of genres did not work well enough and found mobile devices' small displays to make reading upcoming notes difficult. Shacknews said they had trouble with keyboard inputs and crashes on Windows, and they disliked how God of Rock did not have accessibility features that let you increase the size of the interface. They concluded that it could be a good game with more polish.

God of Rock was nominated for Best Fighting Game by The Game Awards in 2023.
