= Venba (video game) =

2023 video game

- Developer: Visai Games
- Publisher: Visai Games
- Producer: Shahrin Khan
- Designer: Abhi
- Programmers: Abhi; Tatsuya Morita-Ahad
- Artists: Sam Elkana; Rae Minos; Danik Tomyn
- Writers: Abhi; Shahrin Khan
- Composer: Alpha Something
- Engine: Unity
- Platforms: Nintendo Switch; PlayStation 5; Windows; Xbox One; Xbox Series X/S; macOS
- Release: Nintendo Switch, PS5, Windows, Xbox One, Xbox Series X/S; July 31, 2023; macOS; July 28, 2025
- Genres: Cooking; Puzzle
- Mode: Single-player

Venba is a narrative cooking video game developed and published by Visai Games. The story begins in 1988 and follows an immigrant Indian couple settling down in Canada and adjusting their day-to-day lives in the new environment. The player controls the titular character, Venba, an Indian woman who moves with her husband to Toronto, where they eventually have a son. The game draws heavily from Tamil culture and South Indian cuisine.

The game was released on July 31, 2023 for Nintendo Switch, PlayStation 5, Windows, Xbox One, and Xbox Series X/S. A macOS version was released in July 2025.

== Gameplay ==
Screenshot from Venba

The core gameplay involves Venba's journey of restoring lost recipes through trial and error. In each chapter, Venba and her son, Kavin, explore their familial relationships through food, which plays out in puzzles. Venba's mother's cookbook has been damaged over time, leading to smudged instructions that make the recipes difficult to follow. The player consults the cookbook to recreate the recipes, as Venba contemplates her own memories to help piece together any missing instructions. They will encounter these obstacles throughout the game when making different dishes and must investigate surrounding instructions and diagrams to fill in the gaps. This obstacle starts off with one or two lines from the recipe missing, to later on becoming an entire page with only diagrams to work with and no legible instructions to tackle cooking the meal properly.

Apart from the cooking mechanics, the player picks dialogue options in conversations with other characters. There is replayability in making different dialogue choices or going back to create past dishes without making mistakes.

== Plot ==
The story follows Venba and her husband Paavalan, who leave Tamil Nadu, a southern Indian state, to begin a new life in Toronto, Canada. The couple struggles with the new language, culture and a lack of job prospects, but hope that their newborn son Kavin has an easier time than them. As Kavin grows up, Venba aims to instil an appreciation for Tamil language and culture in him, but she faces difficulties as Kavin quickly assimilates to Canadian culture. Paavalan passes away, Kavin grows more distant, and without a firm source of income, Venba eventually returns to India alone. After some years, an adult Kavin comes to appreciate the unique culture his parents tried to teach him. He travels to India to visit Venba, apologizing for dismissing his heritage, and hopes she will help teach him more. Each short chapter is a vignette encapsulating a year in Venba’s life.

== Development and release ==
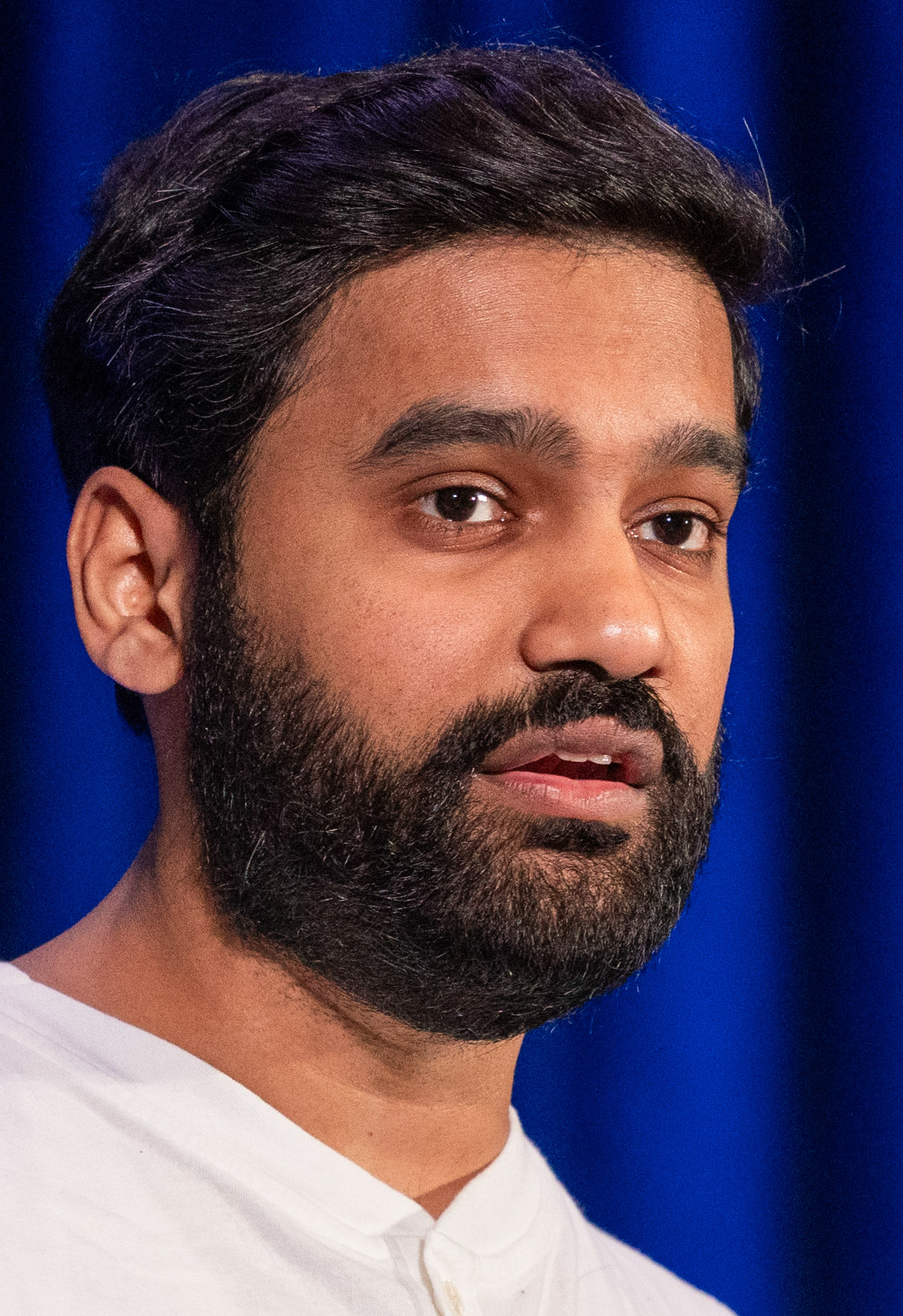
Lead developer Abhijeeth Swaminathan

In an interview with Eurogamer, lead developer Abhi explained that most media relating to immigrant stories focuses on second-generation children, rather than their parents, but it's the parents who have "a cooler story to tell, because they up and leave their country at the age of 40 or 50, and they move to a brand new place." Venba is told from the perspective of the mother, showcasing how cooking becomes a way for her to keep in touch with her roots.

Visai Games has spoken about the challenge of making a cooking game that is interesting to players who are familiar with the South Indian recipes, while ensuring the game is not too difficult for those who are unfamiliar. Because the game introduces players to Tamil cuisine, the developers aimed to ensure the recipes are authentic and representative of the culture. Initially, the developers struggled to design comprehensive puzzles out of the recipes, as Abhi explains: "[South Asian] recipes are usually quite long and complicated and while it was technically possible to make puzzles out of them, it didn't make for very fun gameplay." After extensive research, the developers found that some recipes had puzzles built into them already, and they simply needed to be properly contextualized. The fragmented recipe book mechanic showcases the game's narrative through its gameplay mechanics, in an effort to allow players to feel what it's like to want to express one's own culture from their roots and familial bonds, but not being able to completely translate it in challenging environments.

The developers have spoken about the pivotal role sound design played in ensuring players understood the sounds of southern Indian food, explaining that “capturing the recipes accurately was important to us, and so was making the players feel like they were stepping inside Tamil kitchen." Venba sound designer Neha Patel both cooked the meals and recorded sounds each step of the way, in an effort to capture the most authentic Foley. Beyond Foley for cooking, Abhi has described the lengths the team went to to create the essential background of Tamil cooking, specifically the music on the radio. He recalled his own experiences in his family kitchen with radio or the TV often playing in the background. Visai Games added an in-game radio with a soundtrack scored alongside each narrative era, all tied to the sounds of Tamil cinema from the aligned decade.

The game was released on July 31, 2023 for Nintendo Switch, PlayStation 5, Windows, Xbox One, and Xbox Series X/S. It was initially planned for spring that year.

=== Soundtrack ===
Venba's soundtrack is inspired by several decades of Tamil film music, bringing together a variety of genres and homages to popular composers, in an effort to accentuate the nostalgia and cultural palette of the game. The Tamil lyrics were written with the intention to take the listener on a journey through the evolution of Tamil music, using pop-culture references and poetic storytelling to mark each era. Venba features a track, entitled "Chellakutty", performed by famed Indian film composer, Deva. The soundtrack was released for digital purchase on July 21, 2023 on Bandcamp and additionally made available for purchase as downloadable content on Steam, alongside the game.

== Reception ==
Reception

Aggregate score
Aggregator	Score
Metacritic	(PC) 79/100 (NS) 81/100 (XSXS) 80/100 (PS5) 84/100

Review scores
Publication	Score
Destructoid	7/10
Digital Trends	4.5/5
Eurogamer	4/5
GameSpot	8/10
GamesRadar+	4.5/5
Nintendo Life	8/10
Push Square	9/10
Shacknews	9/10

Venba received generally favorable reviews from critics upon release, according to review aggregator Metacritic.

GameSpot's Veerender Singh Jubbal praised the game's soundtrack, cooking mechanics, and its execution of themes and story, noted that "having South Asian developers, all with different experiences, means Venba is a narrative cooking adventure about an immigrant mother's life that feels authentic." Destructoid writer CJ Andriessen praised Venba's exploration of Tamil culture and cuisine, but criticized its short length, writing that "the food is lovely to look at, as is the rest of the game, but it's all so brief." Nicole Carpenter of Polygon had praise for the game's length, writing that "that sort of pacing is a huge feat for a game like Venba, which packs decades of story into just over an hour. It would have been easy for the story to feel partial or rushed, but the cooking segments really help in slowing down even the most intense moments, letting me linger and feel before moving on."

=== Clones ===
In June 2024 Aftermath reported that the mobile game Sofra by Global Advertising Network LTD was a clone of Venba that "whitewashed out any of the things that make Venba incredible" and was a "sloppy mobile cash grab."

=== Awards and nominations ===
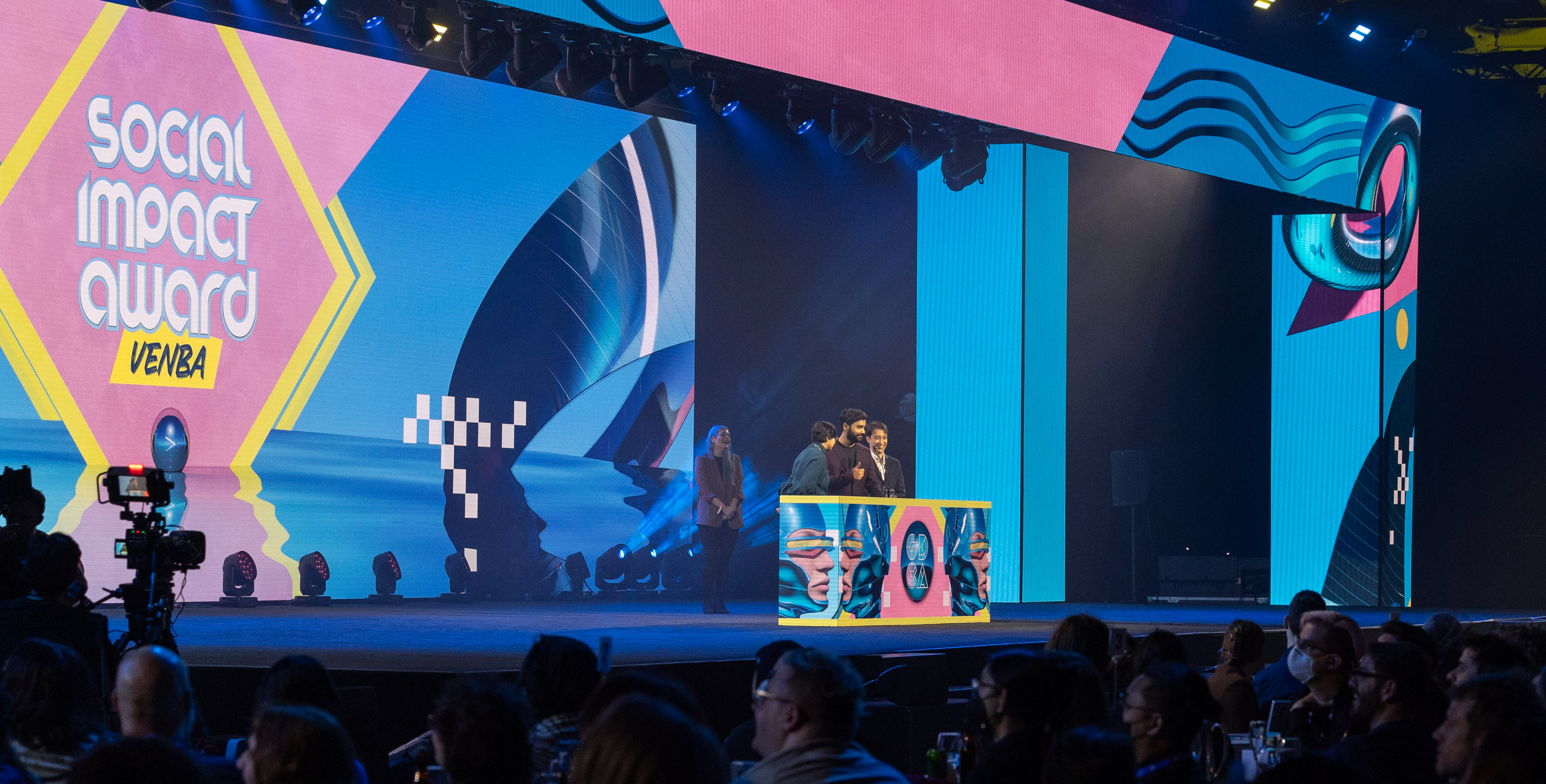
Venba won the Social Impact Award at the 24th Game Developers Choice Awards.

Year	Ceremony	Category	Result	Ref.
2023	The Game Awards 2023	Best Debut Indie Game	Nominated	
2023	The Game Awards 2023	Games for Impact	Nominated	
2024	27th Annual D.I.C.E. Awards	Outstanding Achievement for an Independent Game	Nominated	
2024	27th Annual D.I.C.E. Awards	Outstanding Achievement in Story	Nominated	
2024	24th Game Developers Choice Awards	Best Audio	Nominated	
2024	24th Game Developers Choice Awards	Best Debut	Won	
2024	24th Game Developers Choice Awards	Best Narrative	Nominated	
2024	24th Game Developers Choice Awards	Social Impact Award	Won	
2024	24th Game Developers Choice Awards	Audience Award	Nominated	
2024	Independent Games Festival	Seumas McNally Grand Prize	Won	
2024	Independent Games Festival	Excellence in Audio	Nominated	
2024	Independent Games Festival	Excellence in Narrative	Nominated	
2024	Independent Games Festival	Excellence in Visual Art	Nominated	
2024	20th British Academy Games Awards	Debut Game	Won	
2024	20th British Academy Games Awards	Game Beyond Entertainment	Nominated	
