= A Space for the Unbound =

2023 video game

- Cover featuring the main characters Raya and Atma
- Developer: Mojiken Studio
- Publishers: Toge Productions; Chorus Worldwide
- Director: Dimas Novan Delfiano
- Producer: Eka Pramudita M.
- Designers: Eka Pramudita M.; Elwin Lysander
- Programmer: Ahmad Fadlillah
- Artists: Dimas Novan Delfiano; Roland Melvin Z.; Wildan Rahmat R.
- Writers: Brigitta Rena; Galuh Elsa A. N.
- Composers: Masdito "Ittou" Bachtiar; Christabel Annora; Bambang Iswanto
- Engine: Unity
- Platforms: Nintendo Switch; PlayStation 4; PlayStation 5; Windows; Xbox One; Xbox Series X/S; iOS; Android
- Release: PlayStation 4, PlayStation 5, Xbox One, Xbox Series, Nintendo Switch, Microsoft Windows; January 19, 2023 iOS; April 4, 2025; Android; August 10, 2026
- Genre: Adventure
- Mode: Single-player

A Space for the Unbound is an adventure video game developed by Mojiken Studio and published by Toge Productions. It was released on January 19, 2023, for Nintendo Switch, PlayStation 4, PlayStation 5, Windows, Xbox One, and Xbox Series X/S, for iOS on April 4, 2025, and Android on August 10, 2026. The game is set in the late 1990s and follows Atma and his girlfriend Raya, who live in a suburban area in Indonesia, as they explore their newly attained magical abilities and deal with supernatural powers that threaten their existence.

The game director's focus was capturing the experience of growing up in Indonesia in the 1990s and preserving his memories as an Indonesian. The release was initially planned for 2020 but was delayed due to allegations of a publisher taking advantage of Mojiken Studio and Toge Productions. It received positive reception from critics, particularly on its magical realist setting and heartfelt story. A Space for the Unbound was the winner for Best Storytelling in the 2020 SEA Game Awards and a Games for Impact nominee in The Game Awards 2023.

== Gameplay ==
Critics remarked positively on the game's distinctive pixel artstyle.

A Space for the Unbound is a two-dimensional side-scrolling video game. The player controls Atma, an Indonesian student. His girlfriend is Raya; both are soon going to graduate from high school. Throughout the game, the player can move left or right and can interact with people, objects, and animals by directing Atma to walk or run toward them. Most of the game is at a slow pace and involves exploring the town, talking with people, and picking up objects to move them through point-and-click gameplay to solve puzzles. The game features minigames such as practicing kick-ups, dodging falling objects with button inputs, and fighting minigames that involve pressing a sequence of buttons in a time limit to attack and timed button presses to block attacks. Various game sections involve stealth mechanics and cross-examination scenes similar to Ace Attorney. The game also features cats, which the player can pet and name.

Through the powers of a red book that Atma finds, he gains the ability to "space dive" into people's minds and help fix their problems through puzzles that the player completes. Solving the puzzles during the space dive can affect the person's point of view and help them deal with their trauma, which allows the player to continue the story. Atma also gains the ability later in the game to "riftdive" to another time in a location, which can be done to solve puzzles and advance the plot.

== Plot ==
Atma and his girlfriend Raya, high school students in an Indonesian suburban city, create a bucket list of activities and start by watching a movie. Atma dreams of writing a story with a young girl named Nirmala, who gives him a red book that allows him to "space dive" and enter people's minds. In each dream, he drowns while trying to save Nirmala and then wakes up at his school desk.

During their cinema outing, Raya reveals her reality-altering powers, creating a world based on the film Cat Wonderland. The couple is warned of an impending apocalypse, prompting them to escape back to reality. Atma notices the cinema staff behaving like cats and uses his space diving ability to restore their sanity. Raya collapses shortly after and a crack appears in the sky, signaling an anomaly.

Later, Raya collapses again while trying to halt the anomaly. With help from Admiral, their adopted cat who gains the ability to speak, Atma prepares a cake to restore Raya's strength. Erik, a school bully, accidentally kills Admiral, takes the cake, and knocks out Atma. When Atma catches up to Erik and space dives into his mind, he uncovers Erik's abusive upbringing. Nirmala appears, ejects Atma from Erik's mind, and turns Erik into a monster. Raya restores Erik but seemingly kills him before fainting again as the crack in the sky expands.

Atma reawakens to find Raya missing and the school preparing for a festival. He discovers that Raya has altered the townspeople's minds in retaliation for past mistreatment. With help from his classmate Lulu, Atma restores them to normal. Raya, overwhelmed by the pressure of organizing the festival and trying to escape her trauma, has been rewriting reality. Nirmala transforms Lulu into a monster during a space dive. Atma finds Raya on a bridge, where she seemingly kills Lulu and reveals her intent to control the town. When Atma attempts to space dive into her mind, Raya destroys the book and summons a meteor to crash into the city.

Atma wakes up in the city's ruins while the festival continues undeterred. With Marin's help, Atma reaches the school and protects her from Raya. In a space dive dimension, Atma learns that Marin was once close with Raya but distanced herself after doubting Atma's existence. Nirmala turns Marin into a monster, and Raya destroys her before passing out. Atma retrieves the space diving book and enters Nirmala's mind.

A flashback reveals that the game's events occurred within Raya's mind and that Nirmala and Raya are the same person: Raya Fitri Nirmala. As a child, Raya met Atma, who had run away from home to start a career in writing, and the two became friends. One day, Atma, being unable to swim, drowned trying to save Nirmala. Raya, in a moment of resentment, separated "Nirmala," a representation of her hope and positivity, from herself and blames herself for Atma's death. Raya's inner conflict, compounded by her abusive father, led Nirmala to turn people who wronged Raya into monsters.

Atma space dives into Raya's mind and learns of her abusive father and that the story he and Nirmala wrote was an allegory for her life. Atma and Raya's mother guide her through her traumatic memories and convince her to confront her fears. Raya accepts her past and ascends from the dream world, leaving Atma behind as a memory.

Raya, now visibly older, awakens in a hospital bed to the real world, having recovered from an unstated incident. Her mother, now separated from her spouse, plans to move the family to a new city. She has one last walk around the neighborhood, reflecting on her journey and healing. If the player completes all the items on the bucket list, a post-credits scene shows Raya visiting the spot where Atma died, leaving a bouquet and the space diving book.

== Development ==
Dimas Novan Delfiano, Mojiken Studio member and game director for A Space for the Unbound, started development on the title in 2015. A team of two to three people began work on the game while the studio developed other games concurrently. Dimas completed an initial prototype of the story in 2015, which served as a core for what would be developed. Dimas found the first few years of development incredibly difficult, as he struggled to build a substantial game from the prototype. In 2019, Dimas noted that he had found the "right formula for the game" and Mojiken released a demo that "was released to positive reception" on January 23, 2020. Around the same year, everyone at the studio (numbering about 12–14 people) was reallocated to work on the game.

Dimas wanted to create a game set in an Indonesian high school from a young age and was inspired by the concept of an "anime pilgrimage," where people travel to compare real-life locations to their anime-depicted counterparts. He wanted to highlight his experience of growing up in 1990s Indonesia and wanted players to feel the same passage of time he experienced. Dimas was also inspired by another Japanese concept during development, including "mono no aware". The game was heavily inspired by the works of Japanese filmmaker Makoto Shinkai and the setting is inspired by locations in Surabaya, the city Dimas grew up in. He stated that the game was a preservation of his own memories growing up. The developers consulted professionals to accurately depict anxiety and depression in the story. The space diving mechanic was created to help explore these themes in more detail.

== Release and publishing conflict ==
A Space for the Unbound was announced to be released in late 2020. Chorus Worldwide published the video game in Japan and British video game publisher PQube Games was the global publisher of the console version. The developers postponed the release to the Q3 period of 2021, then in April 2021, the game was announced to be released sometime in 2022.

As part of the promotion of A Space for the Unbound, Mojiken Studio and Toge Productions collaborated with Indonesian comics publishing company Kosmik to create a webcomic titled A Space for the Unbound: Broken Memories. The webcomic was released on the LINE Webtoon application on May 20, 2022.

On August 24, 2022, Toge Productions and Mojiken Studio alleged that PQube Games had taken advantage of them to obtain diversity funds from "a well-known gaming console platform", a grant fund reserved for assisting under-represented game developers during the COVID-19 pandemic. Information about the funds was then withheld by PQube Games to "negotiate the increase of their revenue share." They denied the allegations, stating that Toge Productions had imposed unreasonable revisions to their agreement terms and that the allegations were the aftermath of Toge Productions's failure to reach the desired agreement. As a result of the conflict, Toge Productions postponed the initial release of the game. The conflict was resolved when a joint agreement was reached between Toge Productions, Mojiken Studio, PQube Games, and Chorus Worldwide. In the agreement, PQube Games provided their grant fund as previously promised, returned the publishing rights to Toge Productions, and handed over the global publishing rights for the console version to Chorus Worldwide.

After the agreement, the game's developers released a new trailer as part of Nintendo's Indie World Showcase video, which included a worldwide release date of January 19, 2023. American video game publisher Serenity Forge released physical copies of the game and a collector's edition, which contains an artbook, on the Q1 period of 2024. A mobile version on iOS was announced by Toge Productions on October 8, 2024, and was released on April 4, 2025. The Android version was announced on January 16, 2026 at their official YouTube channel, and was released on August 10, 2026.

== Reception ==
Reception

Aggregate score
Aggregator	Score
Metacritic	(NS) 85/100 (PC) 86/100 (PS5) 83/100

Review scores
Publication	Score
Eurogamer	Recommended
Nintendo Life	8/10 stars
Nintendo World Report	8.5/10
Push Square	8/10 stars
RPGFan	89%
The Guardian	5/5
TouchArcade	4.5/5

A Space for the Unbound received "generally favorable" reviews according to review aggregate website Metacritic.

Reviewers provided positive critical reception upon the game's release for its visuals and setting, which contains "subtle but effective" references to Indonesian culture. The game's pixel art style and soundtrack was described by GamesRadar's Hope Bellingham as "your favourite anime and Game Boy Advance game rolled into one". Reviewers also praised the soundtrack's variety of genres, which include lo-fi music and keroncong, a traditional Indonesian folk music genre. Rachel Watts of Rock Paper Shotgun called the game "part sci-fi drama, part high school romance" while Bellingham identified the game as slice of life.

Eurogamer's Chris Tapsell found the game's setting successful in its portrayal of both universal experiences and Indonesian culture as well as its confluence of mundane and familiar activities with paranormal and fantastical phenomena. Rachel Watts associated the setting to magical realism, a common theme in Mojiken Studio games. The "space dive" mechanic, which critics compared to Psychonauts, was unexpected by Bellingham for a slice of life game.

The gameplay received mixed reactions for its execution. Lex Luddy from TheGamer juxtaposed the slow pace of the game with the intense timing of quick time events in battle and stated that it could have been easier to execute. One game section where the player must quickly dodge objects falling from the sky becomes difficult to do precisely, as the player must double tap to run in one direction. The variety of the gameplay mechanics, which include references to Street Fighter II and Ace Attorney, maintains the game's pace and prevents the game from being "a bit of a chore", Watts says in their review. Reviewers described the gameplay as that of a standard adventure game and padded out by unnecessary tasks.

Reviewers praised the narrative of the game for its emotional story and careful approach in tackling trauma. RPGFan's Audra Bowling felt that the game succeeded in blending both despair and anxiety with themes of hope and healing, and that it could help players see their lives from a new perspective. However, some reviewers have commented on the plot's structure, which starts off with a slow pace as a series of short-term objectives that lack a particular narrative but eventually develop the game's plot. Piero Serra from Adventure Gamers considered the first few hours of the game confusing for Atma's contradictory interactions with other characters, although the main objective to relocate Raya and side quests in the bucket list provided direction to progress the story. Rebekah Valentine of IGN perceived this confusion positively, as the "sense of underlying mystery" urges the player to continue playing to uncover the plot. Tapsell remarked that the eventual incoherence of the plot was necessary and that the game has "no tidy answers" except if viewed as a whole.

=== Awards ===
A Space for the Unbound appeared on lists of the best games of 2023 by Kotaku and Inverse.

Awards and nominations
Date	Award	Category	Result	Ref.
2020	SEA Game Awards	Best Storytelling	Won	
2021	Valencia Indie Awards 2021	Best Game in Development	Won	
2022	Japan Game Awards	Future Division	Won	
2023	Indonesia Game Awards 2023	Game of the Year	Won	
2023	The Game Awards 2023	Games For Impact	Nominated	
2024	New York Game Awards	Off Broadway Award for Best Indie Game	Nominated	
2024	24th Game Developers Choice Awards	Social Impact Award	Nominated	
2024	24th Game Developers Choice Awards	Audience Award	Nominated	
