= The Game Awards 2023 =

American video game award show

- Date: December 7, 2023
- Venue: Peacock Theater, Los Angeles
- Country: United States
- Hosted by: Geoff Keighley
- Preshow host: Sydnee Goodman

Highlights
- Most awards: Baldur's Gate 3 (6)
- Most nominations: Baldur's Gate 3 (9)
- Game of the Year: Baldur's Gate 3
- Website: thegameawards.com

Online coverage
- Runtime: 2 hours, 52 minutes
- Viewership: 118 million
- Produced by: Geoff Keighley; Kimmie Kim
- Directed by: Richard Preuss

The Game Awards 2023 was an award show that honored the best video games of 2023. It was the tenth show hosted by Geoff Keighley, creator and producer of the Game Awards, held with a live audience at the Peacock Theater in Los Angeles, California, on December 7, 2023. The preshow ceremony was hosted by Sydnee Goodman. The event was live streamed across online platforms globally. It featured musical performances from Loren Allred, Heilung, and Old Gods of Asgard, and presentations from celebrity guests, including Timothée Chalamet, Christopher Judge, and Matthew McConaughey.

Baldur's Gate 3 led the show with nine nominations and six wins, including Game of the Year and Best Performance for Neil Newbon. Several new games were announced during the show, including Marvel's Blade, Lost Records: Bloom & Rage, and Visions of Mana. The show was viewed by over 118 million streams, the most in its history to date, (Note: The viewership record was beaten in 2024 with 154 million streams.) with more than 17,000 co-streams from content creators. Journalists criticized the show for prioritizing announcements and celebrities over awards, and its lack of acknowledgement of industry layoffs and the ongoing Gaza humanitarian crisis.

== Background ==
As with previous iterations of the Game Awards, the 2023 show was hosted and produced by Canadian games journalist Geoff Keighley. He returned as an executive producer alongside Kimmie Kim, and Richard Preuss and LeRoy Bennett returned as director and creative director, respectively. Sydnee Goodman returned as host of the 30-minute preshow, titled Opening Act. The presentation took place at the Peacock Theater in Los Angeles, California, on December 7, 2023, and was live streamed across more than 30 online platforms globally, including Facebook, Instagram, Steam, TikTok, Twitch, X, and YouTube.

Public tickets became available for purchase on November 6, and sold out within a week, quicker than any previous year. The show increased security following stage interruptions at the previous ceremony in December 2022 and Gamescom's Opening Night Live in August 2023. Keighley said the show and preshow aimed for a collective three-hour runtime, like its predecessor. The Game Awards 2023 was the fourth show to feature Future Class, a list of 50 individuals from across the video game industry who best represent its future, organized by Keighley and Emily Bouchac. The list was announced on December 5, featuring individuals like Marvel's Midnight Suns writer Emma Kidwell, The Sims 4 experience design lead Alister Lee, and accessibility consultant Ross Minor.

=== Announcements ===
According to Keighley, the show avoided the term "world premiere" for new announcements, instead treating all content equally. Announcements on both released and upcoming games were made for:

- Apex Legends
- Arknights: Endfield
- As Dusk Falls
- Asgard's Wrath 2
- Baldur's Gate 3
- Black Myth: Wukong
- Brothers: A Tale of Two Sons
- Dave the Diver
- Dragon Ball: Sparking! Zero
- Final Fantasy VII Rebirth
- Final Fantasy XVI
- The Finals
- The First Descendant
- Fortnite Rocket Racing
- God of War Ragnarök
- GTFO
- Guilty Gear Strive
- Honkai: Star Rail
- Lego Fortnite
- Metaphor: ReFantazio
- No Man's Sky
- The Outlast Trials
- Palia
- Persona 3 Reload
- Prince of Persia: The Lost Crown
- Ready or Not
- Rise of the Rōnin
- Senua's Saga: Hellblade II
- Skull and Bones
- Stormgate
- Suicide Squad: Kill the Justice League
- Warhammer 40,000: Rogue Trader
- Warhammer 40,000: Space Marine 2
- Zenless Zone Zero

New games announced included:

- Big Walk
- Untitled Crazy Taxi game
- Den of Wolves
- Exoborne
- Exodus
- Untitled Golden Axe game
- Harmonium: The Musical
- Untitled Jet Set Radio game
- Jurassic Park: Survival
- Kemuri
- Last Sentinel
- Light No Fire
- Lost Records: Bloom & Rage
- Marvel's Blade
- Mecha Break
- Monster Hunter Wilds
- No Rest for the Wicked
- OD
- Pony Island 2: Panda Circus
- Shinobi: Art of Vengeance
- Streets of Rage: Revolution
- Tales of Kenzera: Zau
- The Casting of Frank Stone
- The First Berserker: Khazan
- The Rise of the Golden Idol
- Thrasher
- Usual June
- Visions of Mana
- Windblown
- World of Goo 2

== Winners and nominees ==
Nominees were announced on November 13, 2023. Any game released for public consumption on or before November 17 was eligible for consideration. The nominees were compiled by a jury panel composed of members from over 100 media outlets globally. Specialized juries decided the nominees for categories such as accessibility, adaptation, and esports. Winners were determined between the jury (90 percent) and public voting (10 percent); the latter was held via the official website and Discord server (Note: In China, fan voting is held via Bilibili, WeChat, and other platforms.) until December 6. The exception is the Players' Voice award, fully nominated and voted-on by the public, for which voting opened on November 27. According to Keighley, first-day website voting saw a 73% increase over the previous year.

The Game Awards partnered with Nighttimes and Studio 568 to create an in-game hub world in Fortnite, available from November 14, allowing players to vote for their favorite user-created islands among ten nominees; the winner was announced during the ceremony. Keighley had been seeking to create more in-game events since hosting a live show in Fortnite in 2019, and sought to allow in-game live viewership of the show in the future. He felt it was a more effective advertising technique for the show than traditional marketing like billboards. According to Keighley, the hub world surpassed one million plays within three days, with more than 875,000 unique players.

=== Awards ===
Winners are listed first, highlighted in boldface, and indicated with a double dagger (‡).

==== Media ====
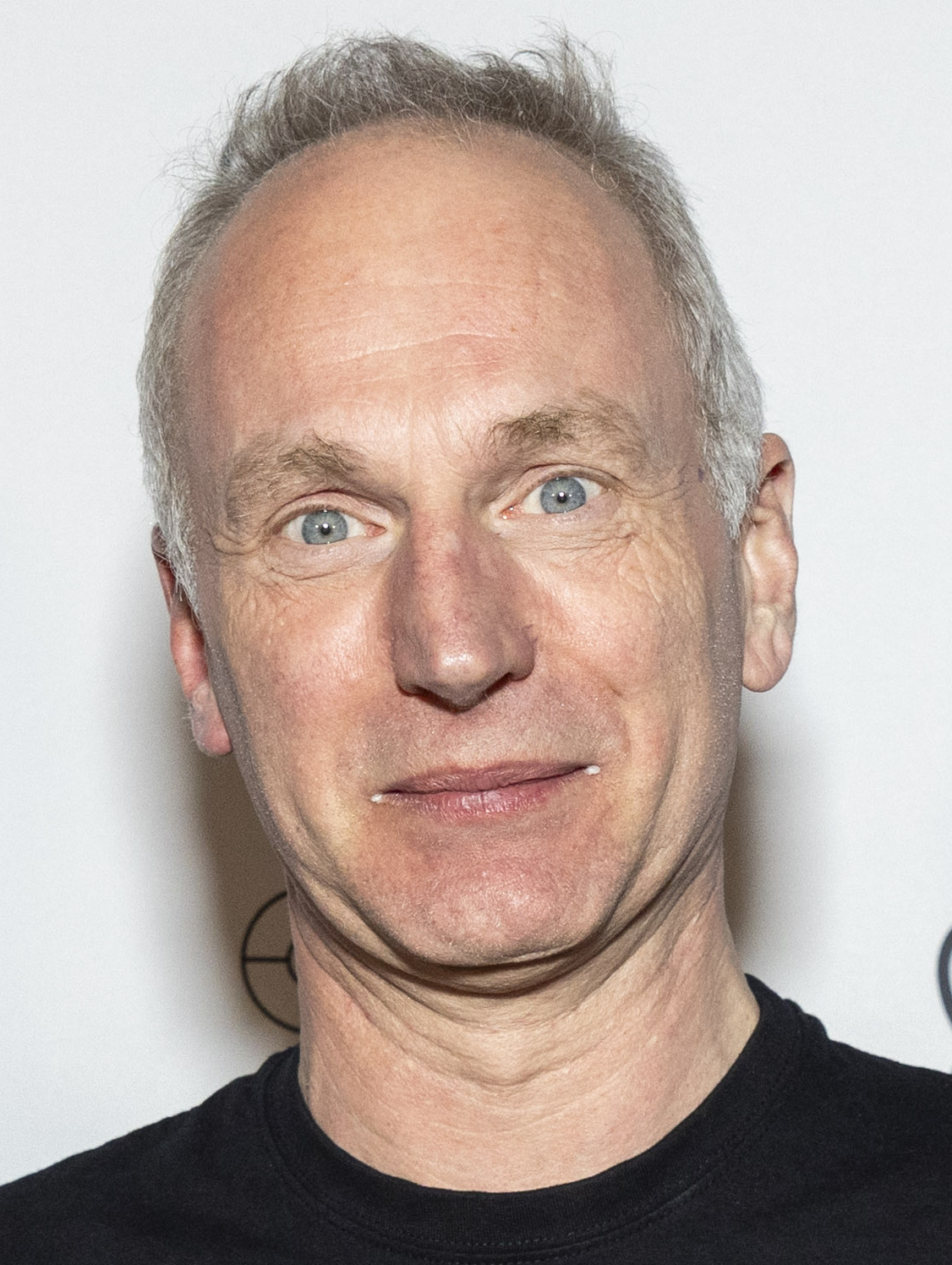
Swen Vincke accepted Game of the Year for Baldur's Gate 3.

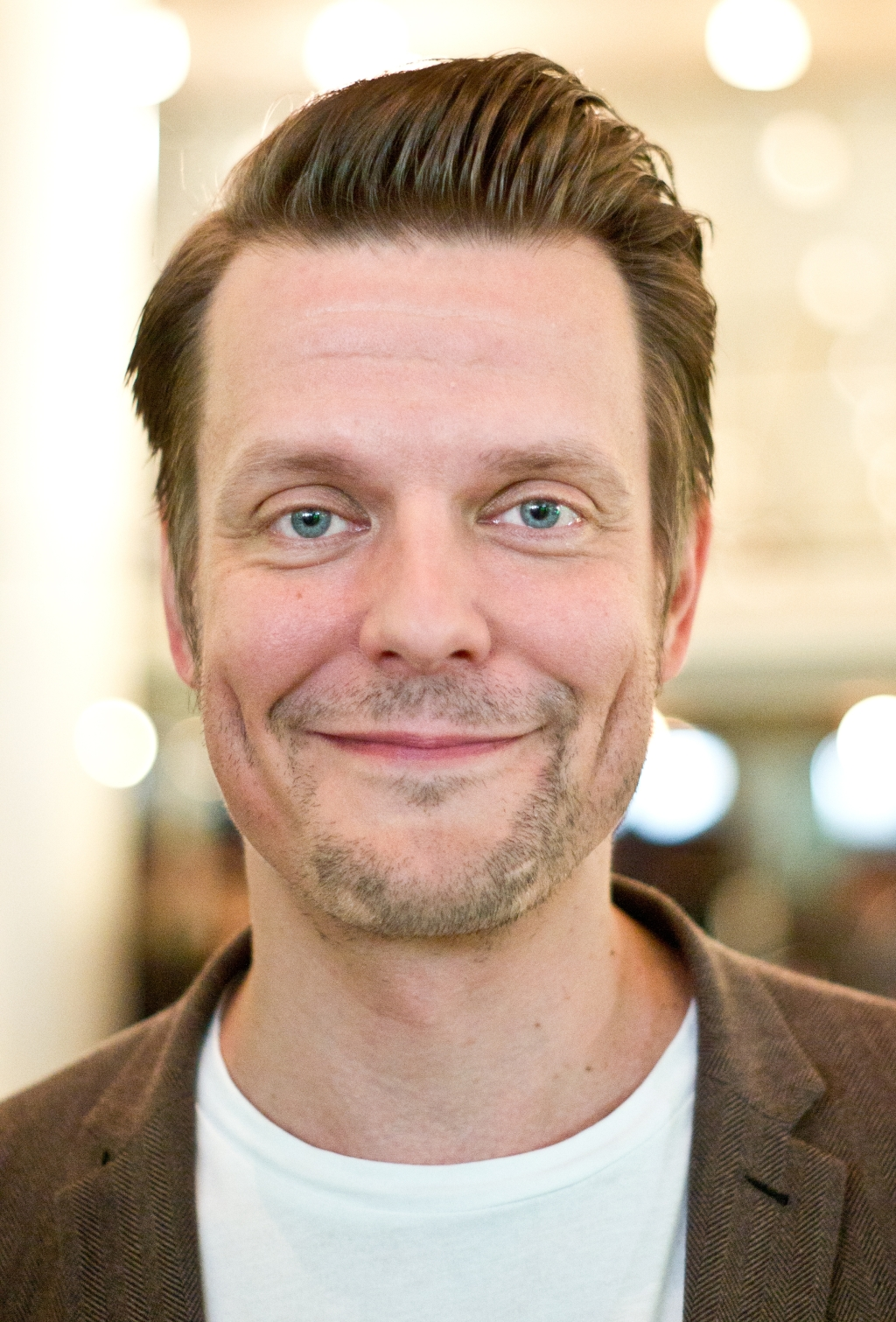
Sam Lake accepted Best Game Direction and Best Narrative for Alan Wake 2.

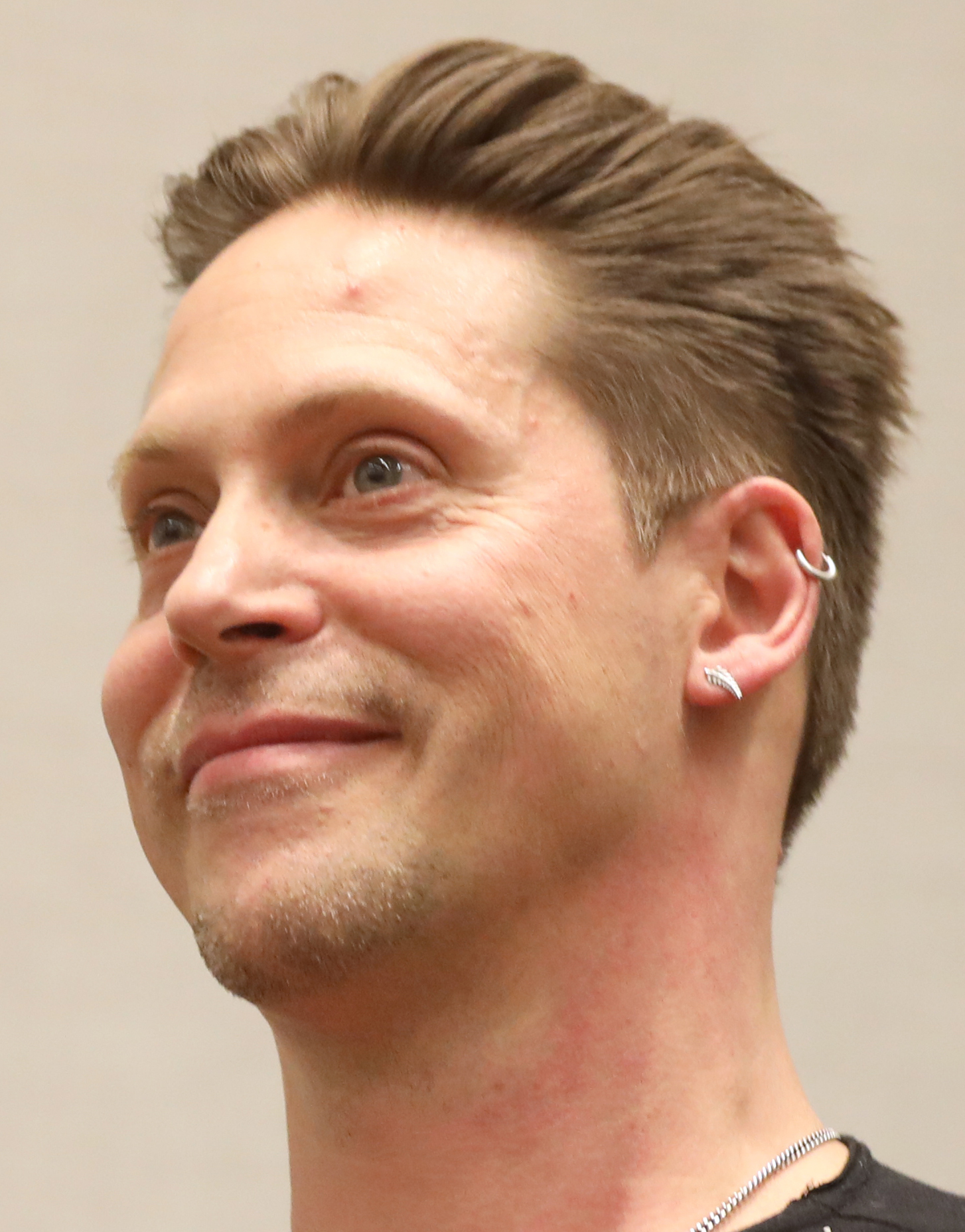
Neil Newbon won Best Performance for his role as Astarion in Baldur's Gate 3.

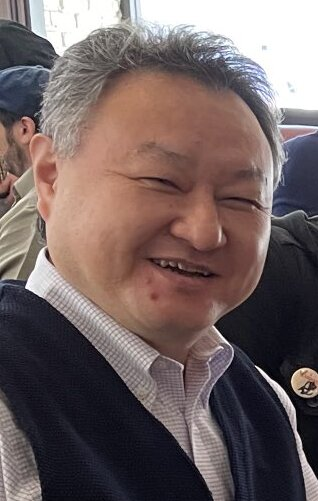
Shuhei Yoshida accepted Games for Impact for Tchia.

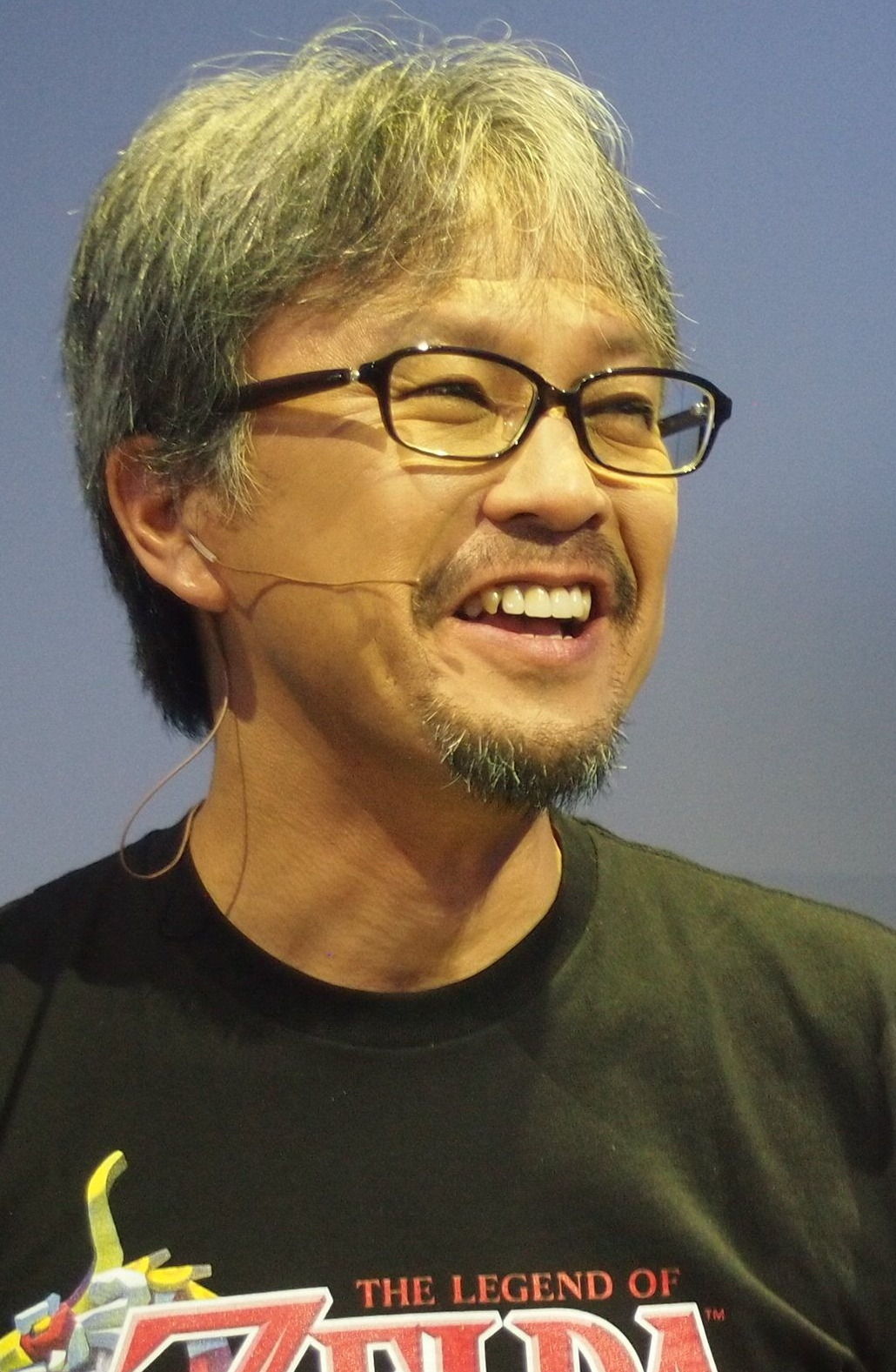
Eiji Aonuma accepted Best Action/Adventure Game for The Legend of Zelda: Tears of the Kingdom.

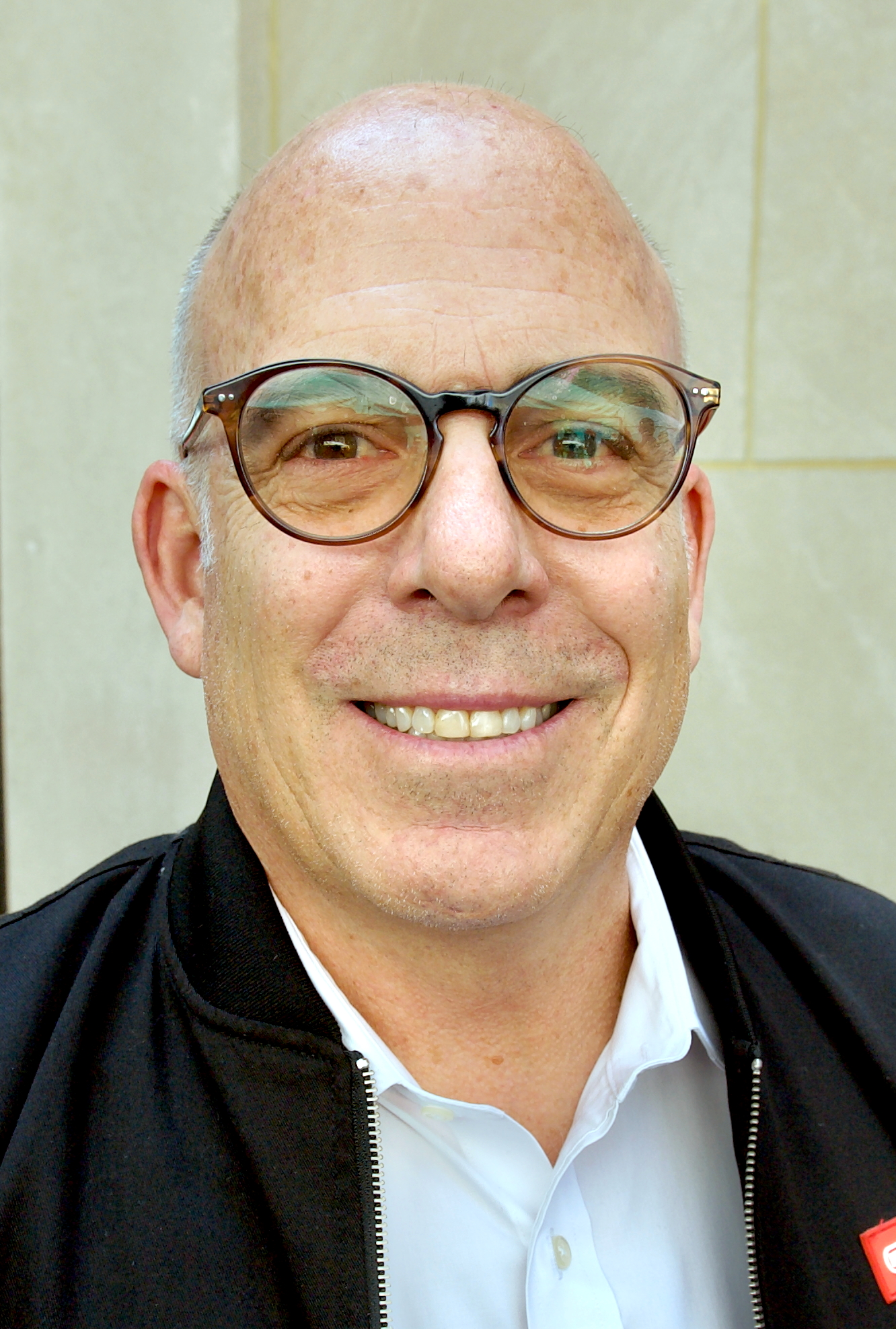
Doug Bowser accepted Best Family Game for Super Mario Bros. Wonder.

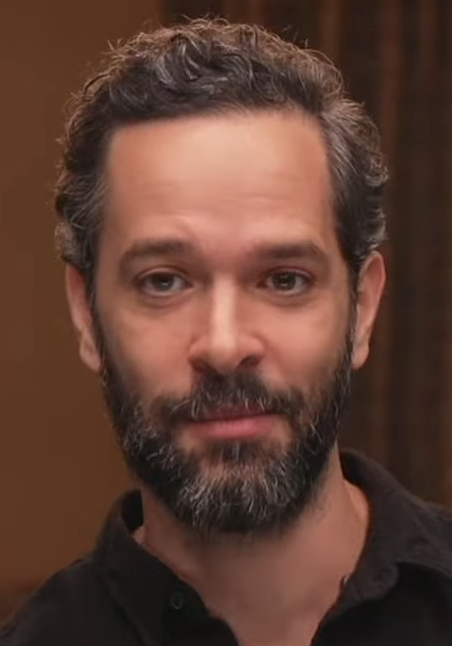
Neil Druckmann accepted Best Adaptation for The Last of Us alongside Asad Qizilbash.

Game of the Year	Best Game Direction
**Baldur's Gate 3 – Larian Studios**‡; Alan Wake 2 – Remedy Entertainment / Epic Games Publishing; The Legend of Zelda: Tears of the Kingdom – Nintendo EPD / Nintendo; Marvel's Spider-Man 2 – Insomniac Games / Sony Interactive Entertainment; Resident Evil 4 – Capcom; Super Mario Bros. Wonder – Nintendo EPD / Nintendo	**Alan Wake 2 – Remedy Entertainment / Epic Games Publishing**‡; Baldur's Gate 3 – Larian Studios; The Legend of Zelda: Tears of the Kingdom – Nintendo EPD / Nintendo; Marvel's Spider-Man 2 – Insomniac Games / Sony Interactive Entertainment; Super Mario Bros. Wonder – Nintendo EPD / Nintendo
Best Narrative	Best Art Direction
**Alan Wake 2 – Remedy Entertainment / Epic Games Publishing**‡; Baldur's Gate 3 – Larian Studios; Cyberpunk 2077: Phantom Liberty – CD Projekt Red / CD Projekt; Final Fantasy XVI – Square Enix; Marvel's Spider-Man 2 – Insomniac Games / Sony Interactive Entertainment	**Alan Wake 2 – Remedy Entertainment / Epic Games Publishing**‡; Hi-Fi Rush – Tango Gameworks / Bethesda Softworks; The Legend of Zelda: Tears of the Kingdom – Nintendo EPD / Nintendo; Lies of P – Round8 Studio / Neowiz; Super Mario Bros. Wonder – Nintendo EPD / Nintendo
Best Score and Music	Best Audio Design
**Final Fantasy XVI – Masayoshi Soken**‡; Alan Wake 2 – Petri Alanko; Baldur's Gate 3 – Borislav Slavov; Hi-Fi Rush – Shuichi Kobori; The Legend of Zelda: Tears of the Kingdom – Nintendo	**Hi-Fi Rush – Tango Gameworks / Bethesda Softworks**‡; Alan Wake 2 – Remedy Entertainment / Epic Games Publishing; Dead Space – Motive Studios / Electronic Arts; Marvel's Spider-Man 2 – Insomniac Games / Sony Interactive Entertainment; Resident Evil 4 – Capcom
Best Performance	Games for Impact
**Neil Newbon as Astarion – Baldur's Gate 3**‡; Idris Elba as Solomon Reed – Cyberpunk 2077: Phantom Liberty; Melanie Liburd as Saga Anderson – Alan Wake 2; Yuri Lowenthal as Peter Parker / Spider-Man – Marvel's Spider-Man 2; Cameron Monaghan as Cal Kestis – Star Wars Jedi: Survivor; Ben Starr as Clive Rosfield – Final Fantasy XVI	**Tchia – Awaceb / Kepler Interactive**‡; A Space for the Unbound – Mojiken Studio / Toge Productions; Chants of Sennaar – Rundisc / Focus Entertainment; Goodbye Volcano High – KO_OP; Terra Nil – Free Lives / Devolver Digital; Venba – Visai Games
Best Independent Game	Best Debut Indie Game
**Sea of Stars – Sabotage Studio**‡; Cocoon – Geometric Interactive / Annapurna Interactive; Dave the Diver – Mintrocket; Dredge – Black Salt Games / Team17; Viewfinder – Sad Owl Studios / Thunderful Publishing	**Cocoon – Geometric Interactive / Annapurna Interactive**‡; Dredge – Black Salt Games / Team17; Pizza Tower – Tour De Pizza; Venba – Visai Games; Viewfinder – Sad Owl Studios / Thunderful Publishing
Best Ongoing Game	Best Community Support
**Cyberpunk 2077 – CD Projekt Red / CD Projekt**‡; Apex Legends – Respawn Entertainment / Electronic Arts; Final Fantasy XIV – Square Enix; Fortnite – Epic Games; Genshin Impact – miHoYo / HoYoverse	**Baldur's Gate 3 – Larian Studios**‡; Cyberpunk 2077 – CD Projekt Red / CD Projekt; Destiny 2 – Bungie; Final Fantasy XIV – Square Enix; No Man's Sky – Hello Games
Best Mobile Game	Best VR / AR Game
**Honkai: Star Rail – miHoYo / HoYoverse**‡; Final Fantasy VII: Ever Crisis – Applibot, Square Enix Creative Business Unit I / Square Enix; Hello Kitty Island Adventure – Sunblink; Monster Hunter Now – Niantic, Capcom; Terra Nil – Free Lives / Devolver Digital	**Resident Evil Village – Capcom**‡; Gran Turismo 7 – Polyphony Digital / Sony Interactive Entertainment; Humanity – tha LTD. / Enhance Games; Horizon Call of the Mountain – Guerrilla Games, Firesprite / Sony Interactive Entertainment; Synapse – nDreams
Best Action Game	Best Action / Adventure Game
**Armored Core VI: Fires of Rubicon – FromSoftware / Bandai Namco Entertainment**‡; Dead Island 2 – Dambuster Studios / Deep Silver; Ghostrunner 2 – One More Level / 505 Games; Hi-Fi Rush – Tango Gameworks / Bethesda Softworks; Remnant 2 – Gunfire Games / Gearbox Publishing	**The Legend of Zelda: Tears of the Kingdom – Nintendo EPD / Nintendo**‡; Alan Wake 2 – Remedy Entertainment / Epic Games Publishing; Marvel's Spider-Man 2 – Insomniac Games / Sony Interactive Entertainment; Resident Evil 4 – Capcom; Star Wars Jedi: Survivor – Respawn Entertainment / Electronic Arts
Best Role Playing Game	Best Fighting Game
**Baldur's Gate 3 – Larian Studios**‡; Final Fantasy XVI – Square Enix; Lies of P – Round8 Studio / Neowiz; Sea of Stars – Sabotage Studio; Starfield – Bethesda Game Studios / Bethesda Softworks	**Street Fighter 6 – Capcom**‡; God of Rock – Modus Games; Mortal Kombat 1 – NetherRealm Studios / Warner Bros. Games; Nickelodeon All-Star Brawl 2 – Fair Play Labs / GameMill Entertainment; Pocket Bravery – Statera Studio / PQube
Best Family Game	Best Sim / Strategy Game
**Super Mario Bros. Wonder – Nintendo EPD / Nintendo**‡; Disney Illusion Island – Dlala Studios / Disney Electronic Content; Party Animals – Recreate Games / Source Technology; Pikmin 4 – Nintendo EPD / Nintendo; Sonic Superstars – Arzest, Sonic Team / Sega	**Pikmin 4 – Nintendo EPD / Nintendo**‡; Advance Wars 1+2: Re-Boot Camp – WayForward / Nintendo; Cities: Skylines II – Colossal Order / Paradox Interactive; Company of Heroes 3 – Relic Entertainment / Sega; Fire Emblem Engage – Intelligent Systems / Nintendo
Best Sports / Racing Game	Best Multiplayer Game (Note: Presented in conjunction with Discord)
**Forza Motorsport – Turn 10 Studios / Xbox Game Studios**‡; EA Sports FC 24 – EA Vancouver, EA Romania / EA Sports; F1 23 – Codemasters / EA Sports; Hot Wheels Unleashed 2: Turbocharged – Milestone; The Crew Motorfest – Ubisoft Ivory Tower / Ubisoft	**Baldur's Gate 3 – Larian Studios**‡; Diablo IV – Blizzard Team 3, Blizzard Albany / Blizzard Entertainment; Party Animals – Recreate Games / Source Technology; Street Fighter 6 – Capcom; Super Mario Bros. Wonder – Nintendo EPD / Nintendo
Innovation in Accessibility	Best Adaptation (Note: Awarded to media based on video games)
**Forza Motorsport – Turn 10 Studios / Xbox Game Studios**‡; Diablo IV – Blizzard Team 3, Blizzard Albany / Blizzard Entertainment; Hi-Fi Rush – Tango Gameworks / Bethesda Softworks; Marvel's Spider-Man 2 – Insomniac Games / Sony Interactive Entertainment; Mortal Kombat 1 – NetherRealm Studios / Warner Bros. Games; Street Fighter 6 – Capcom	**The Last of Us (television series) – PlayStation Productions / HBO; based on The Last of Us by Sony Interactive Entertainment**‡; Castlevania: Nocturne (animated series) – Powerhouse Animation / Netflix; based on Castlevania by Konami; Gran Turismo (film) – PlayStation Productions / Sony Pictures Releasing; based on Gran Turismo by Sony Interactive Entertainment; The Super Mario Bros. Movie (animated film) – Illumination, Nintendo / Universal Pictures; based on Mario by Nintendo; Twisted Metal (television series) – PlayStation Productions / Peacock; based on Twisted Metal by Sony Interactive Entertainment
Most Anticipated Game	Players' Voice (Note: 100 percent public-voted award with a three-round nomination process that began with 30 games)
**Final Fantasy VII Rebirth – Square Enix Creative Business Unit I / Square Enix**‡; Hades II – Supergiant Games; Like a Dragon: Infinite Wealth – Ryu Ga Gotoku Studio / Sega; Star Wars Outlaws – Massive Entertainment / Ubisoft; Tekken 8 – Bandai Namco Studios, Arika / Bandai Namco Entertainment	**Baldur's Gate 3 – Larian Studios**‡; Cyberpunk 2077: Phantom Liberty – CD Projekt Red / CD Projekt; Genshin Impact – miHoYo / HoYoverse; The Legend of Zelda: Tears of the Kingdom – Nintendo EPD / Nintendo; Marvel's Spider-Man 2 – Insomniac Games / Sony Interactive Entertainment

==== Esports and creators ====
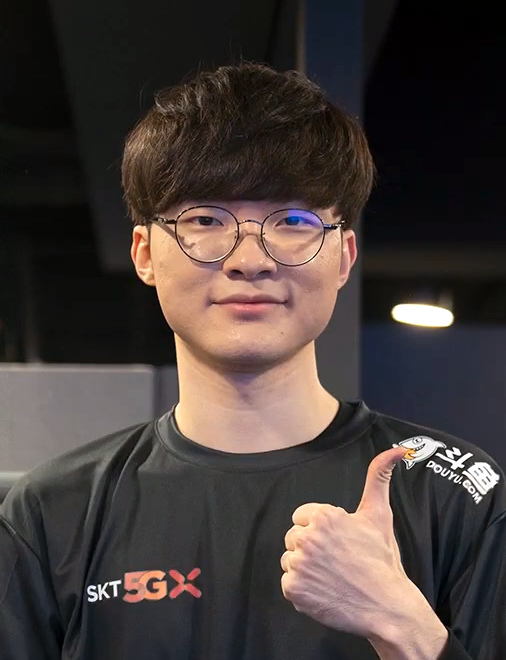
Lee "Faker" Sang-hyeok won Best Esports Athlete.

Rémy "XTQZZZ" Quoniam of Team Vitality requested the removal of his Best Esports Coach nomination as he had not coached any professional games in 2023.

Best Esports Game	Best Esports Athlete
**Valorant – Riot Games**‡; Counter-Strike 2 – Valve; Dota 2 – Valve; League of Legends – Riot Games; PUBG Mobile – Lightspeed & Quantum Studio / Level Infinite	**Lee "Faker" Sang-hyeok (T1, League of Legends)**‡; Phillip "ImperialHal" Dosen (TSM, Apex Legends); Mathieu "ZywOo" Herbaut (Team Vitality, Counter-Strike: Global Offensive); Park "Ruler" Jae-hyuk (JD Gaming, League of Legends); Max "Demon1" Mazanov (Evil Geniuses, Valorant); Paco "HyDra" Rusiewiez (New York Subliners, Call of Duty)
Best Esports Team	Best Esports Coach
**JD Gaming (League of Legends)**‡; Evil Geniuses (Valorant); Fnatic (Valorant); Gaimin Gladiators (Dota 2); Team Vitality (Counter-Strike 2)	**Christine "potter" Chi (Evil Geniuses, Valorant)**‡; Jordan "Gunba" Graham (Florida Mayhem, Overwatch 2); Rémy "XTQZZZ" Quoniam (Team Vitality, Counter-Strike: Global Offensive); Danny "zonic" Sørensen (Team Vitality, Counter-Strike: Global Offensive); Yoon "Homme" Sung-young (JD Gaming, League of Legends)
Best Esports Event	Content Creator of the Year
**2023 League of Legends World Championship**‡; BLAST.tv Paris Major 2023; Evo 2023; The International 2023; 2023 Valorant Champions	**Ironmouse**‡; People Make Games; Quackity; Spreen; SypherPK

=== Multiple nominations and awards ===
==== Multiple nominations ====
Baldur's Gate 3 led the show with nine nominations, followed by Alan Wake 2 and Marvel's Spider-Man 2 with eight each. Nintendo led the publishers with 15 nominations, (Note: Nintendo received an additional nomination as co-producer of The Super Mario Bros. Movie for Best Adaptation.) followed by Sony Interactive Entertainment with 10. In addition to video game publishers, PlayStation Productions received three nominations for its film and television products in Best Adaptation, and Sony Pictures Television received two.

Games that received multiple nominations
Nominations	Game
9	Baldur's Gate 3
8	Alan Wake 2
8	Marvel's Spider-Man 2
6	The Legend of Zelda: Tears of the Kingdom
5	Cyberpunk 2077
5	Hi-Fi Rush
5	Super Mario Bros. Wonder
4	Final Fantasy XVI
3	Resident Evil 4
3	Street Fighter 6
2	Cocoon
2	Diablo IV
2	Dredge
2	Final Fantasy XIV
2	Forza Motorsport
2	Genshin Impact
2	Lies of P
2	Mortal Kombat 1
2	Party Animals
2	Pikmin 4
2	Sea of Stars
2	Star Wars Jedi: Survivor
2	Terra Nil
2	Venba
2	Viewfinder

Nominations by publisher
Nominations	Publisher
15	Nintendo
10	Sony Interactive Entertainment
9	Epic Games
9	Larian Studios
8	Capcom
8	Square Enix
6	Bethesda Softworks
5	CD Projekt
4	Electronic Arts
4	Riot Games
4	Sega
3	HoYoverse
2	Annapurna Interactive
2	Bandai Namco Entertainment
2	Blizzard Entertainment
2	Devolver Digital
2	EA Sports
2	Neowiz
2	Sabotage Studio
2	Source Technology
2	Team17
2	Thunderful Publishing
2	Ubisoft
2	Visai Games
2	Warner Bros. Games
2	Xbox Game Studios

==== Multiple awards ====
Baldur's Gate 3 (Larian Studios) led the show with six wins, followed by Alan Wake 2 (Epic Games) with three, and Forza Motorsport (Xbox Game Studios) with two. Nintendo also won three awards, while Capcom and Square Enix won two.

Games that received multiple wins
Awards	Game
6	Baldur's Gate 3
3	Alan Wake 2
2	Forza Motorsport

Wins by publisher
Awards	Publisher
6	Larian Studios
3	Epic Games
3	Nintendo
2	Capcom
2	Square Enix
2	Xbox Game Studios

== Presenters and performers ==
=== Presenters ===
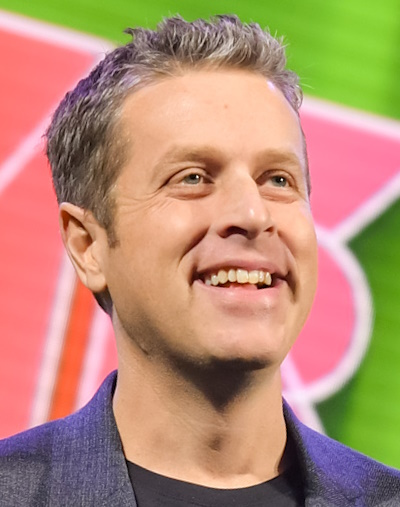
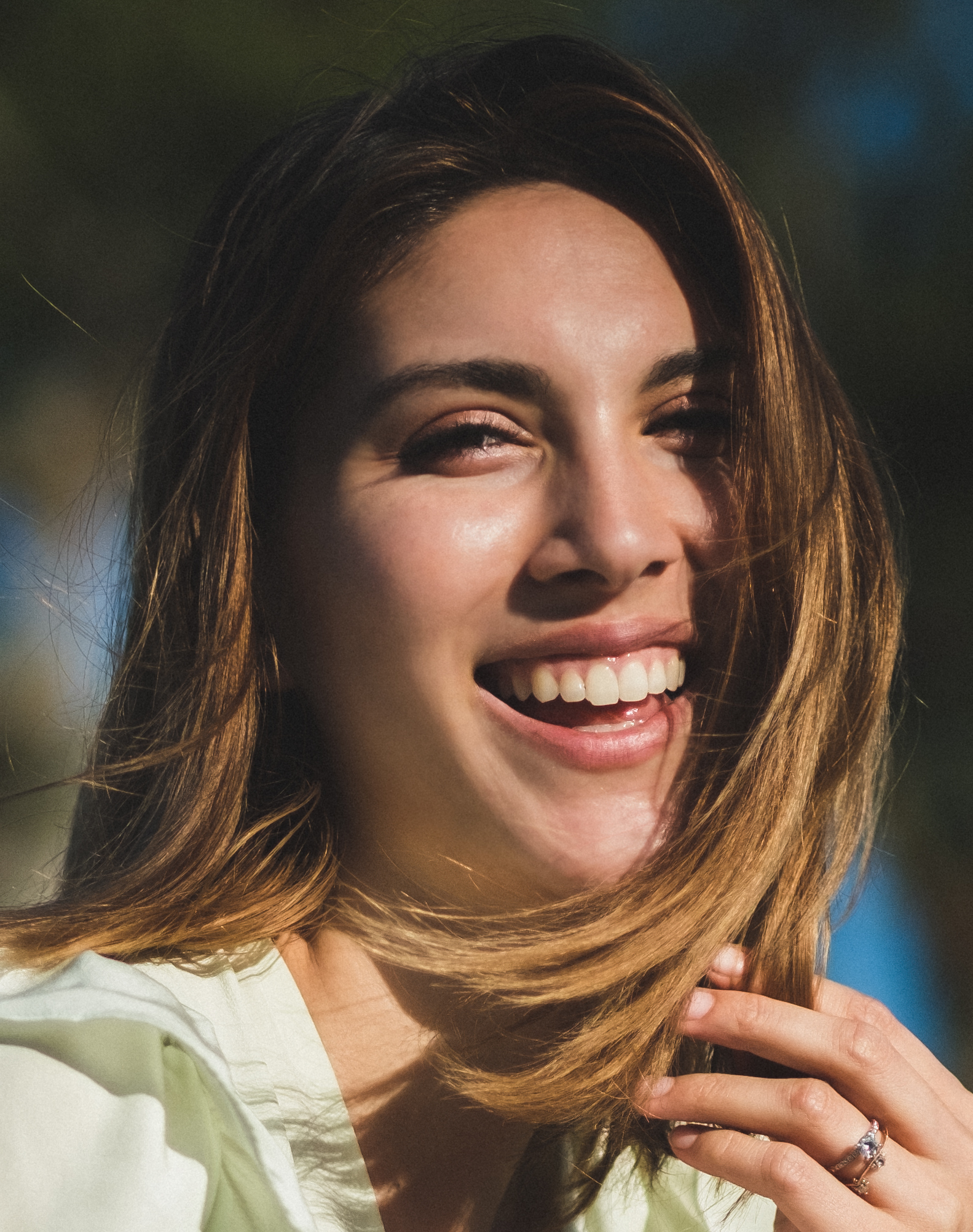
Geoff Keighley (top) hosted the main show while Sydnee Goodman (bottom) hosted the preshow.

The following individuals, listed in order of appearance, presented awards or introduced trailers. All other awards were presented by Keighley or Goodman.

Name	Role
Christopher Judge	Presented the award for Best Performance
Matthew McConaughey	Presented the announcement trailer for Exodus
Melina Juergens	Introduced performer Heilung
Ed Boon	Presented the award for Best Narrative
Ikumi Nakamura	Presented the announcement trailer for Kemuri
Gonzo (Note: Puppet performed by Bill Barretta and voiced by Dave Goelz)	Introduced the award for Best Debut Indie Game
Hideo Kojima	Introduced the announcement trailer for OD
Jordan Peele	Introduced the announcement trailer for OD
Zedd	Presented the award for Best Audio Design
Rebecca Ford	Introduced the gameplay trailer for Warframe: Whispers in the Walls
Megan Everett	Introduced the gameplay trailer for Warframe: Whispers in the Walls
Caroline Marchal	Presented the award for Games for Impact
Abubakar Salim	Introduced the announcement trailer for Tales of Kenzera: Zau
Dinga Bakaba	Introduced the announcement trailer for Marvel's Blade
Bill Roseman	Introduced the announcement trailer for Marvel's Blade
Anthony Mackie	Presented the award for Best Ongoing Game
Steve C. Martin	Introduced the announcement trailer for Last Sentinel
David Harewood	Introduced performer Old Gods of Asgard
Ulf Andersson	Introduced free weekend trailer for GTFO and announcement trailer for Den of Wolves
Matthew Mercer	Introduced the launch trailer for Asgard's Wrath 2
Walton Goggins	Presented the award for Best Adaptation
Aaron Moten	Presented the award for Best Adaptation
Ella Purnell	Presented the award for Best Adaptation
Sean Murray	Introduced the announcement trailer for Light No Fire
Simu Liu	Introduced the story and gameplay trailer for Stormgate
Simu Liu	Presented the award for Best Action/Adventure Game
Vince Zampella	Presented the award for Best Game Direction
Gustav Tilleby	Introduced the release trailer for The Finals
Ryōzō Tsujimoto	Introduced the announcement trailer for Monster Hunter Wilds
Timothée Chalamet	Presented the award for Game of the Year

=== Performers ===
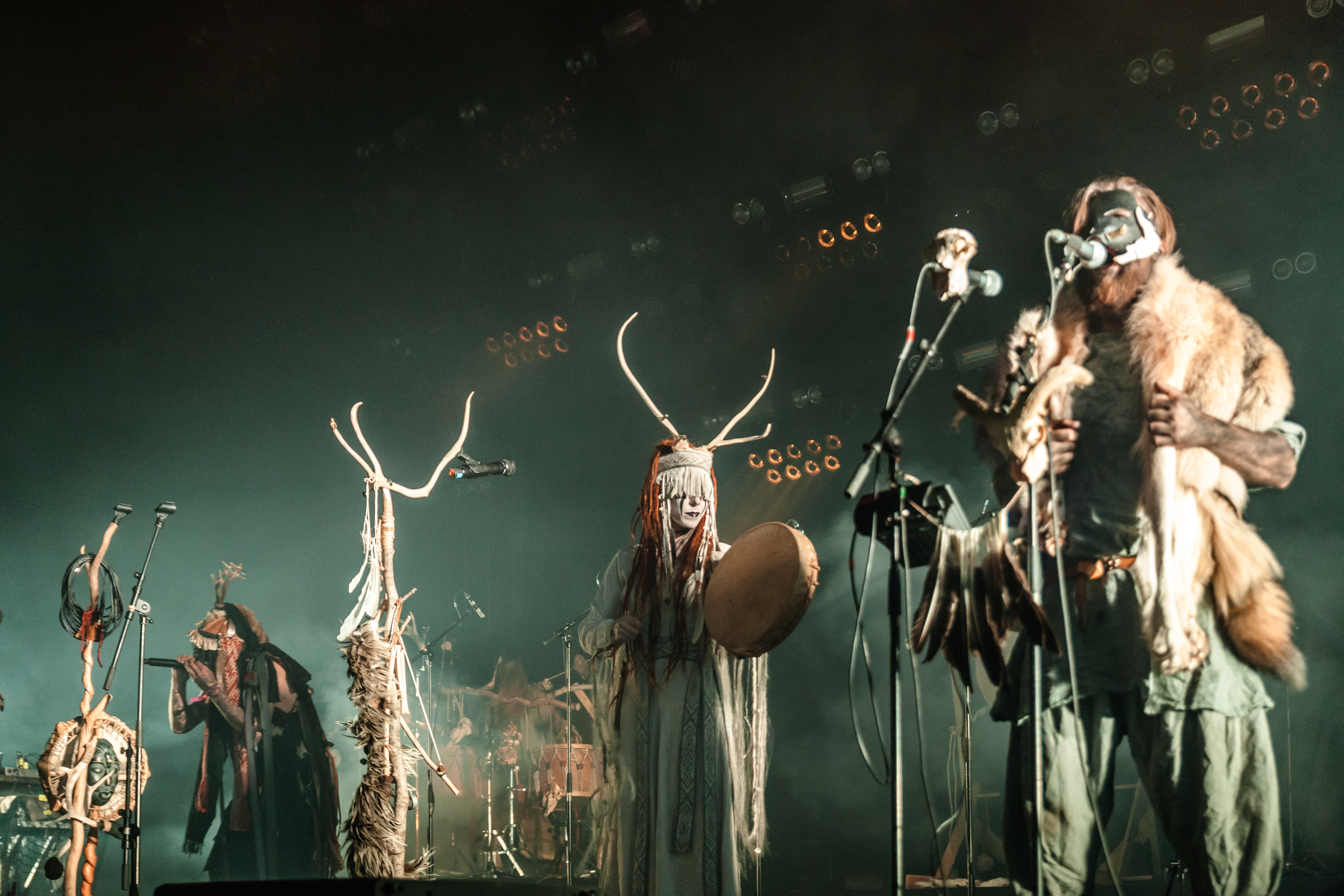
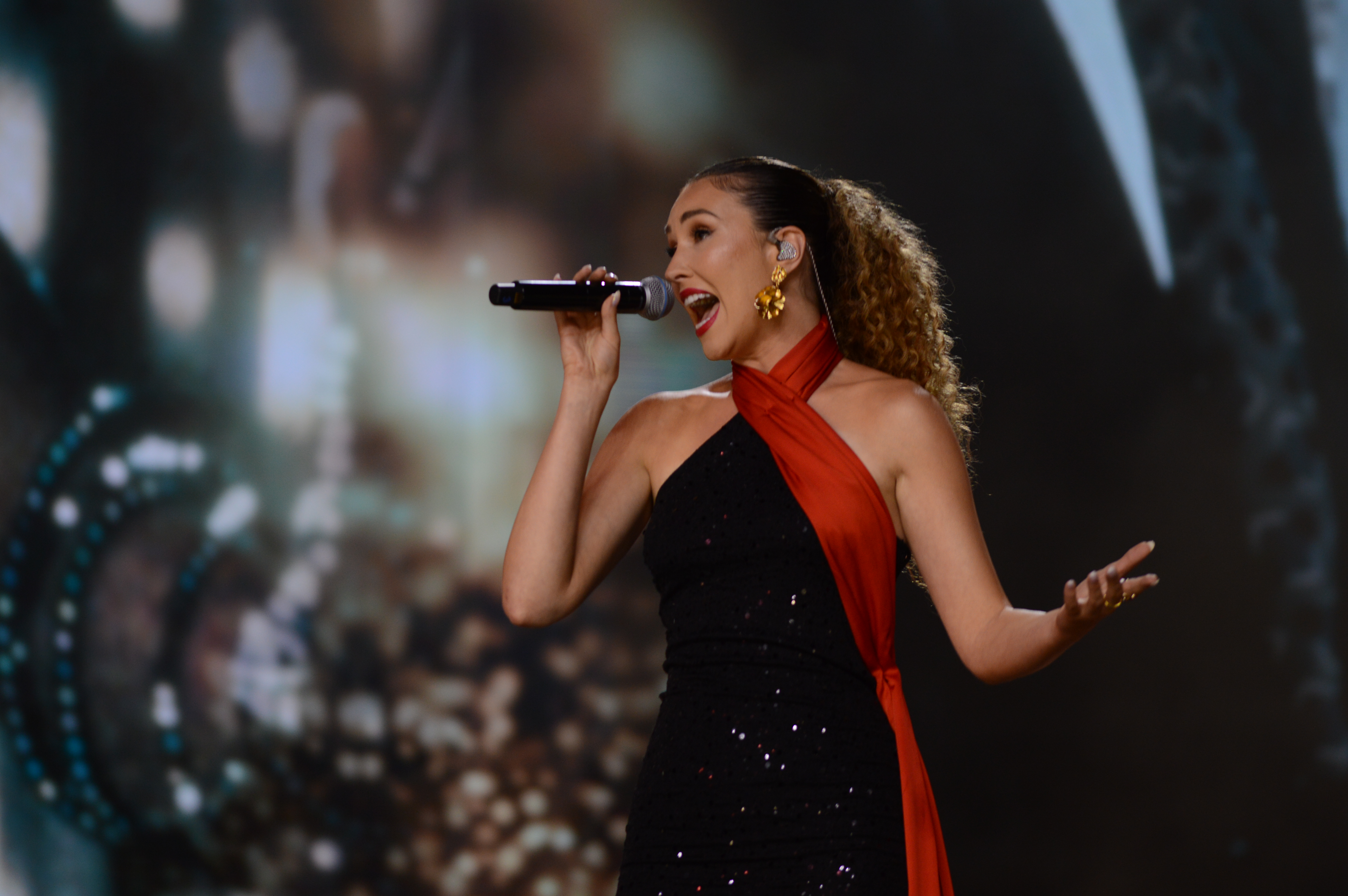
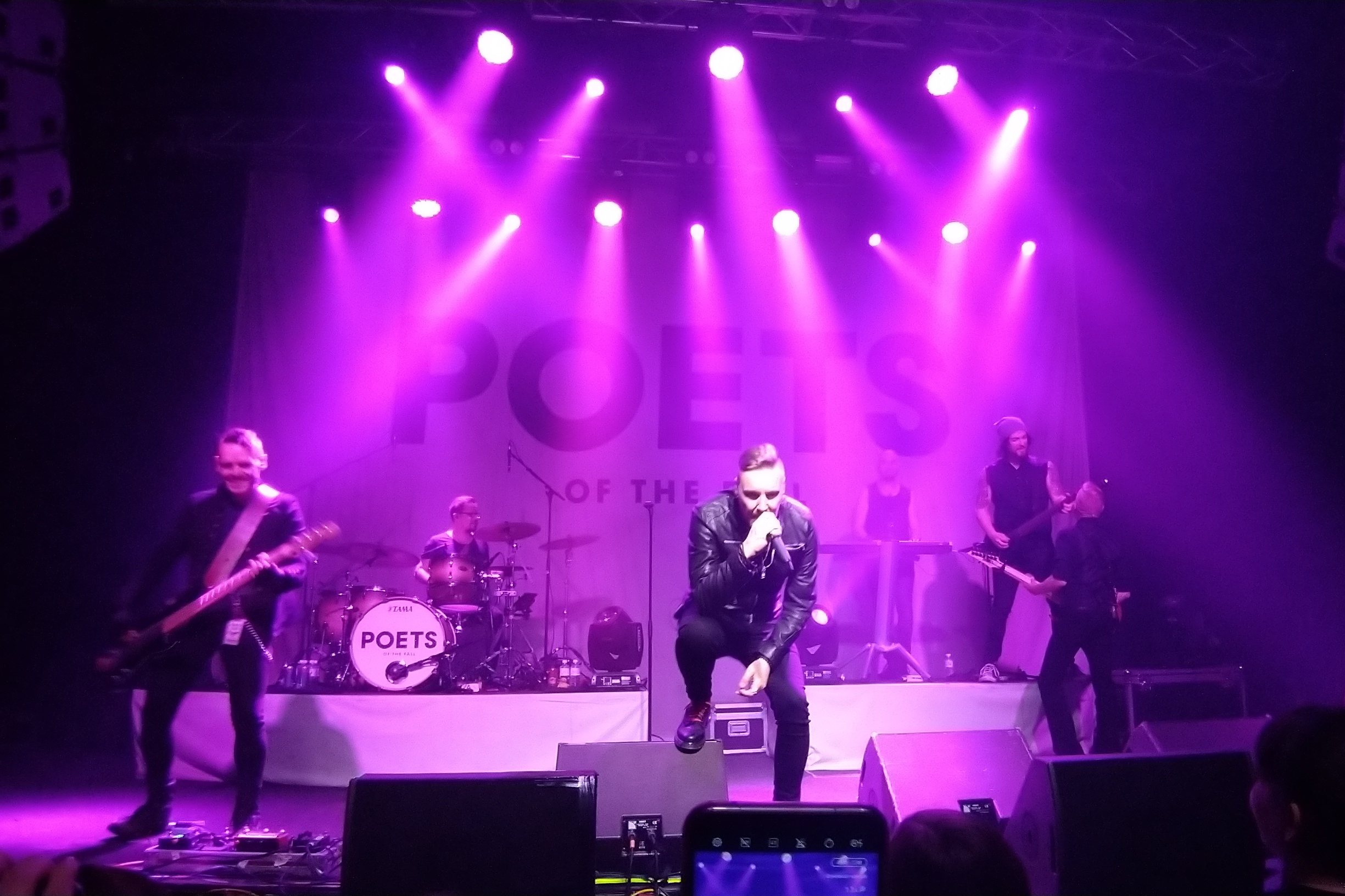
The Game Awards 2023 featured musical performances from (top to bottom) Heilung, Loren Allred, and Old Gods of Asgard.

The following individuals or groups performed musical numbers. Pedro Eustache, who became known as "Flute Guy" during the 2022 ceremony, returned to perform as part of the Game Awards Orchestra.

Name	Song	Game(s)
Heilung	"Seidh"	Senua's Saga: Hellblade II
The Game Awards Orchestra (Note: Conducted by Lorne Balfe)	"No Promises to Keep"	Final Fantasy VII Rebirth
Loren Allred	"No Promises to Keep"	Final Fantasy VII Rebirth
David Harewood	"Herald of Darkness"	Alan Wake 2
Sam Lake	"Herald of Darkness"	Alan Wake 2
Old Gods of Asgard	"Herald of Darkness"	Alan Wake 2
Matthew Porretta	"Herald of Darkness"	Alan Wake 2
Ilkka Villi	"Herald of Darkness"	Alan Wake 2
The Game Awards Orchestra	Game of the Year medley (Note: The Game of the Year medley's songs included: "Yötön Yö" from Alan Wake 2; "Main Theme Part I" from Baldur's Gate 3; "Grassland Theme" from Super Mario Bros Wonder; "Witness the Power" from Resident Evil 4; "Main Theme" from The Legend of Zelda: Tears of the Kingdom; "Greater Together" from Marvel's Spider-Man 2)	Alan Wake 2
The Game Awards Orchestra	Game of the Year medley	Baldur's Gate 3
The Game Awards Orchestra	Game of the Year medley	The Legend of Zelda: Tears of the Kingdom
The Game Awards Orchestra	Game of the Year medley	Marvel's Spider-Man 2
The Game Awards Orchestra	Game of the Year medley	Resident Evil 4
The Game Awards Orchestra	Game of the Year medley	Super Mario Bros. Wonder

== Reception ==
=== Nominees ===
Some journalists were surprised by Cyberpunk 2077's four nominations—twice as many as its original nominations in 2021—particularly due to the game's troubled launch. Many considered Destiny 2's Best Community Support nomination poorly timed, coming weeks after layoffs at developer Bungie, including much of its community team. Journalists felt several performances were overlooked and suggested Best Performance be split to consider leading and supporting performances to widen its scope. TheGamer's Stacey Henley found Pizza Tower's nomination for Best Debut Indie Game but not Best Independent Game incongruous.

The absence of nominations for Chained Echoes was highlighted as a flaw in the eligibility period for games released the preceding December; some writers opined the show had a recency bias, with half the Game of the Year nominees released in October. Many reporters and players highlighted the sole nomination for Starfield, a blockbuster game from a reputable developer, though some found it appropriate due to the game's lesser quality compared to its competition. The lack of nominations for Hogwarts Legacy was similarly highlighted, with some citing the game's divisiveness as a possible reason, though others felt it was due to its relative quality. Some lamented the omission of Octopath Traveler 2, and others felt Final Fantasy XVI was snubbed a Game of the Year nomination.

Several journalists and viewers expressed confusion at Dave the Diver's Best Independent Game nomination as its developer, Mintrocket, is a subsidiary of the larger company Nexon, which previously claimed the game was "not necessarily" an indie; TheGamer's Henley wrote that Baldur's Gate 3 was "technically an entirely independent game" but was likely not considered eligible due to developer Larian Studios's employee count and use of an existing intellectual property. In response, Keighley said "independent can mean different things to different people" and opted to allow the jury to decide the final selections. TheGamer's Jade King called Games for Impact "a locker to stuff all the diverse games into", with four of its six nominees not receiving any other nominations, and felt it was typically limited to independent games despite others fitting the criteria.

=== Ceremony ===
Before the ceremony, more than 3,000 game industry members, including 79 previous Future Class recipients—more than half of the 150 members to date—signed an open letter calling for a statement to be read during the show addressing the ongoing Gaza humanitarian crisis, supporting the rights of Palestinians and calling for a ceasefire, and asking the industry to address the dehumanization of people from South West Asia and North Africa and their portrayal as villains or terrorists in games. The letter's author, 2021 Future Class recipient Younès Rabii, said it was motivated by Meg Jayanth's withdrawal as a presenter at the Golden Joystick Awards in October after being barred from making a statement about Palestinians. The Mary Sue's Ana Valens bemoaned the show's lack of response and Paste's Garrett Martin criticized it as "cowardly". Rock Paper Shotgun's Alice Bell felt the show only would have voiced support if it "was a profitable stance rather than a moral one". After the ceremony, developers of nominees Goodbye Volcano High and Venba said they had planned to acknowledge the crisis in their acceptance speeches. Keighley spoke with Future Class members after the show; some members felt he was deflective and unprepared, while others found the meeting productive and hopeful. Members gave a presentation to Keighley and Bouchac in December about their negative experiences at the show and lack of resources and opportunities throughout the year; some felt their complaints were taken seriously and that the program consequently improved.

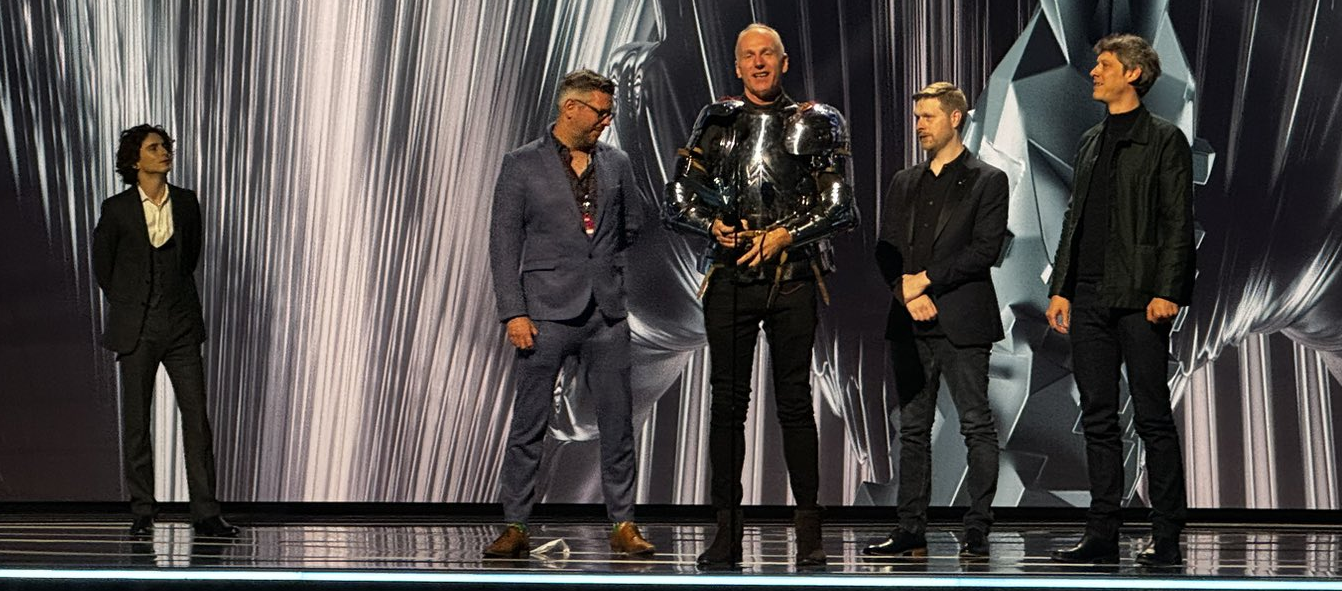
The show was criticized for prioritizing celebrities such as Timothée Chalamet (left) over nominees and winners, such as Larian Studios (right).

The ceremony was criticized for prioritizing announcements and celebrity guests over nominees and winners. Some journalists felt this was represented by actor Timothée Chalamet presenting Game of the Year instead of a game developer. Obsidian Entertainment director Josh Sawyer called the show "an embarrassing indictment of a segment of the industry desperate for validation via star power with little respect for the devs it's supposedly honoring". Eurogamer's Chris Tapsell felt future ceremonies should mirror the goals of its own industry rather than seek validation and relevance from others. Video Games Chronicle's Andy Robinson empathized with the production team's challenges and considered the show among the best to date but felt it suffered from runtime and curation problems. VentureBeat's Dean Takahashi felt the show "lived up to the reputation of being ... the Oscars of gaming". Some commentators considered highlights included Old Gods of Asgard's performance and Abubakar Salim announcing Tales of Kenzera: Zau in memory of his late father.

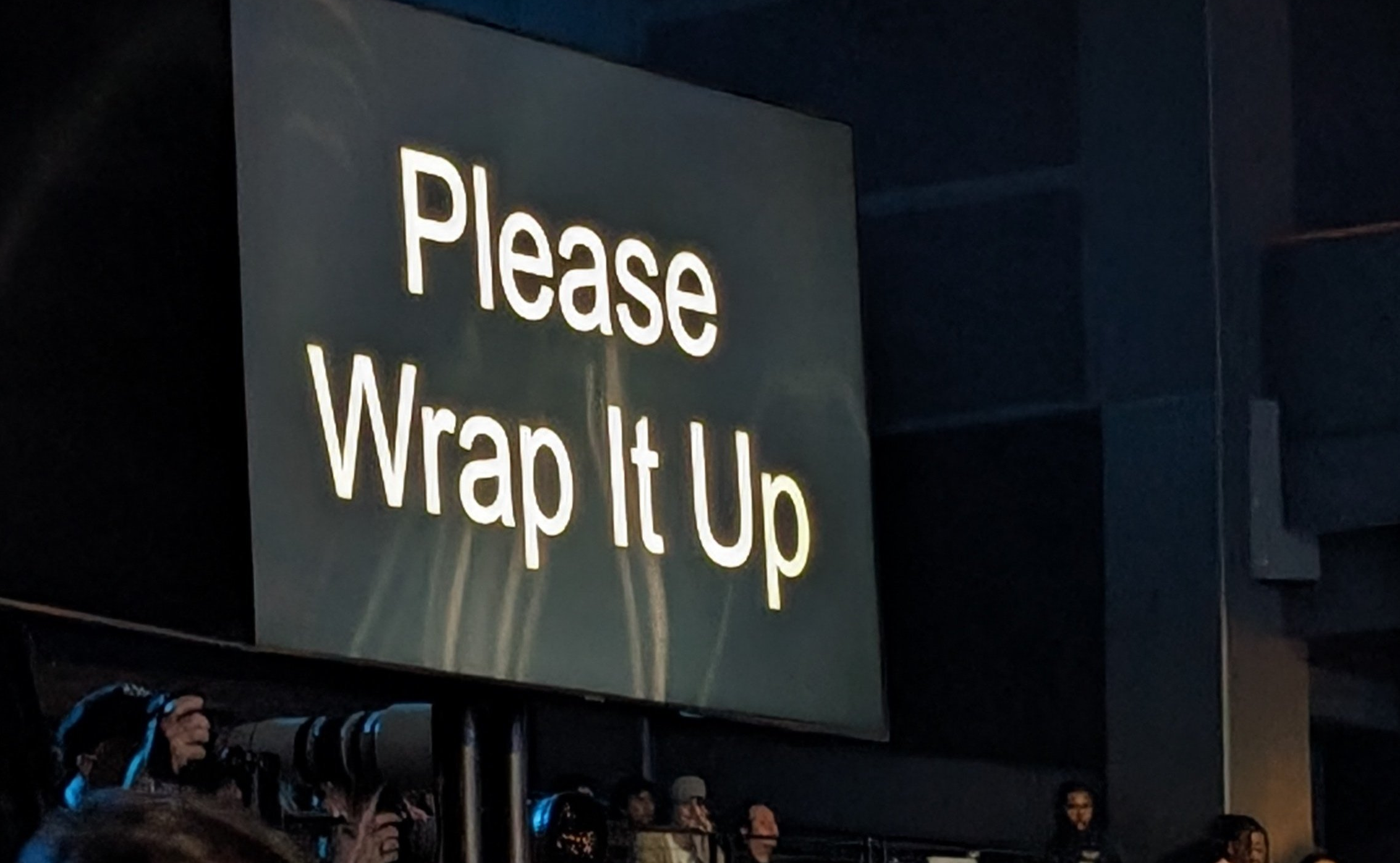
Journalists criticized the use of a teleprompter limiting winners' speeches to thirty seconds.

Journalists found it disrespectful that celebrity guests were given several minutes to speak—including more than six minutes for Hideo Kojima and Jordan Peele—while winners were allocated thirty seconds before being prompted to "wrap it up" and cut off by music, and others were relegated to the preshow or announced in quick succession without acceptance speeches. The Escapist's Liam Nolan calculated that winners' speeches cumulatively ran for less than 11 minutes, compared to the Academy Awards's 30-minute average. Commentators cited Best Performance winner Neil Newbon being cut off while talking about players' heartfelt responses to his work, and Game of the Year acceptee Swen Vincke while paying tribute to his deceased colleague, and found it disrespectful considering several acceptees speak English as a second language. Keighley said he asked his team to relax the rule during the show and acknowledged it would be addressed in the future. GameSpot and IGN published speeches from winners who were unable to accept at the show.

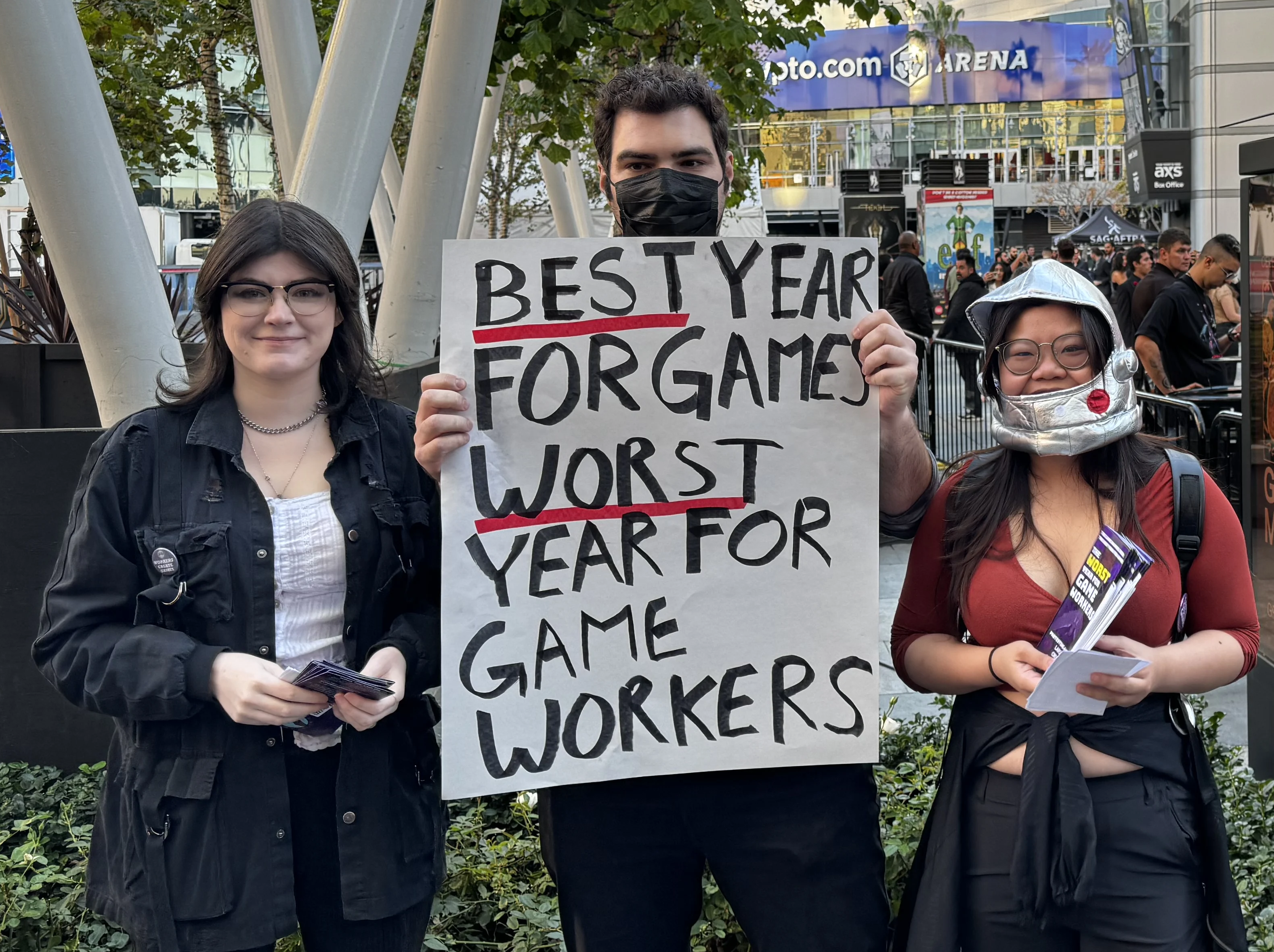
The show was picketed by pro-worker protestors advocating for unionization.

Critics bemoaned the show's lack of acknowledgement of the video game industry's mass layoffs; VentureBeat's Rachel Kaser found it particularly disappointing considering the show's focus on film and television industry professionals, and The Verge's Ash Parrish wrote that "Keighley let video game developers down". Dot Esports's Issy van der Velde called it "disappointing but not entirely unexpected" based on the show's history of avoiding acknowledgment. Game Developer's Chris Kerr criticized Keighley's opening speech for calling for unity but failing to address layoffs, and felt the show should spend "less time chasing a hollow sense of legitimacy by curating a showcase that has the cultural awareness and humanity of a shameless Super Bowl ad". The ceremony was picketed by pro-worker protestors advocating for unionization, including members of the Game Workers of Southern California and SAG-AFTRA; one picket sign read "best year for games, worst year for game workers".

Some Call of Duty developers criticized presenter Christopher Judge's joke that his 2022 acceptance speech was lengthier than Call of Duty: Modern Warfare III's (2023) single-player story campaign. Current and former developers countered by citing Call of Duty's higher commercial success, though some deleted their responses and said they respected God of War, in which Judge portrays Kratos. Barry Sloane, who portrays Modern Warfare's Captain Price, similarly criticized Judge's joke but later wrote "all's fair in games and war" and complimented his performances. Sledgehammer Games's Darcy Sandall found Judge's joke unexpected "from a peer, at an event that [sic] supposed to be celebrating this year's achievements in gaming", particularly in light of reports regarding its development involving crunch.

=== Viewership ===
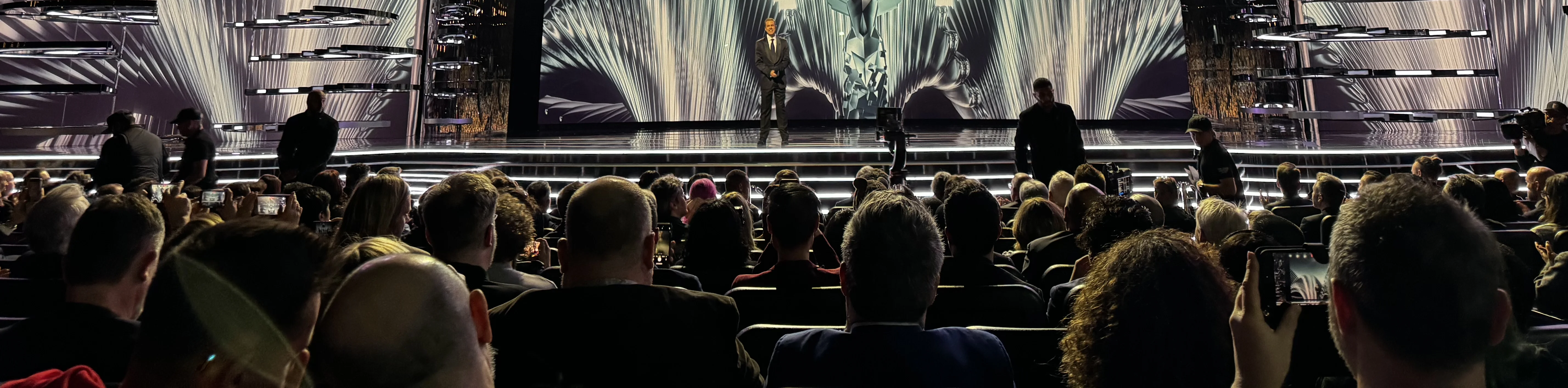
The in-person audience for the Game Awards 2023 at the Peacock Theater

An estimated 118 million viewers watched the ceremony, the most in the show's history to date and a 15% increase from the previous year. More than 17,000 content creators co-streamed the event, including over 13,680 on Twitch (a 24% increase) and 4,000 on YouTube. On Twitch, the show peaked at 1.94 million concurrent viewers and saw a 10% increase in total watch time. The extension "Twitch Predicts The Game Awards" reached almost four million views, with 330,000 concurrent viewers. On YouTube, the ceremony set a show record with a peak of 1.7 million concurrent viewers, a 35% increase, with over 900,000 on the official channel, a 53% increase.
