= 24th Game Developers Choice Awards =

Awards ceremony

- Date: March 20, 2024
- Venue: Moscone Center
- Hosted by: Alanah Pearce

Highlights
- Most awards: Baldur's Gate 3 (3)
- Most nominations: Baldur's Gate 3 and The Legend of Zelda: Tears of the Kingdom (7)
- Lifetime Achievement Award: Yoko Shimomura
- Ambassador Award: Fawzi Mesmar
- Game of the Year: Baldur's Gate 3

The 24th Game Developers Choice Awards was an award ceremony honoring outstanding achievements by game developers and video games released in 2023. The event took place on March 20, 2024, at the Moscone Center in San Francisco, California and was hosted by Alanah Pearce. It was held alongside the Independent Games Festival awards.

== Winners and nominees ==
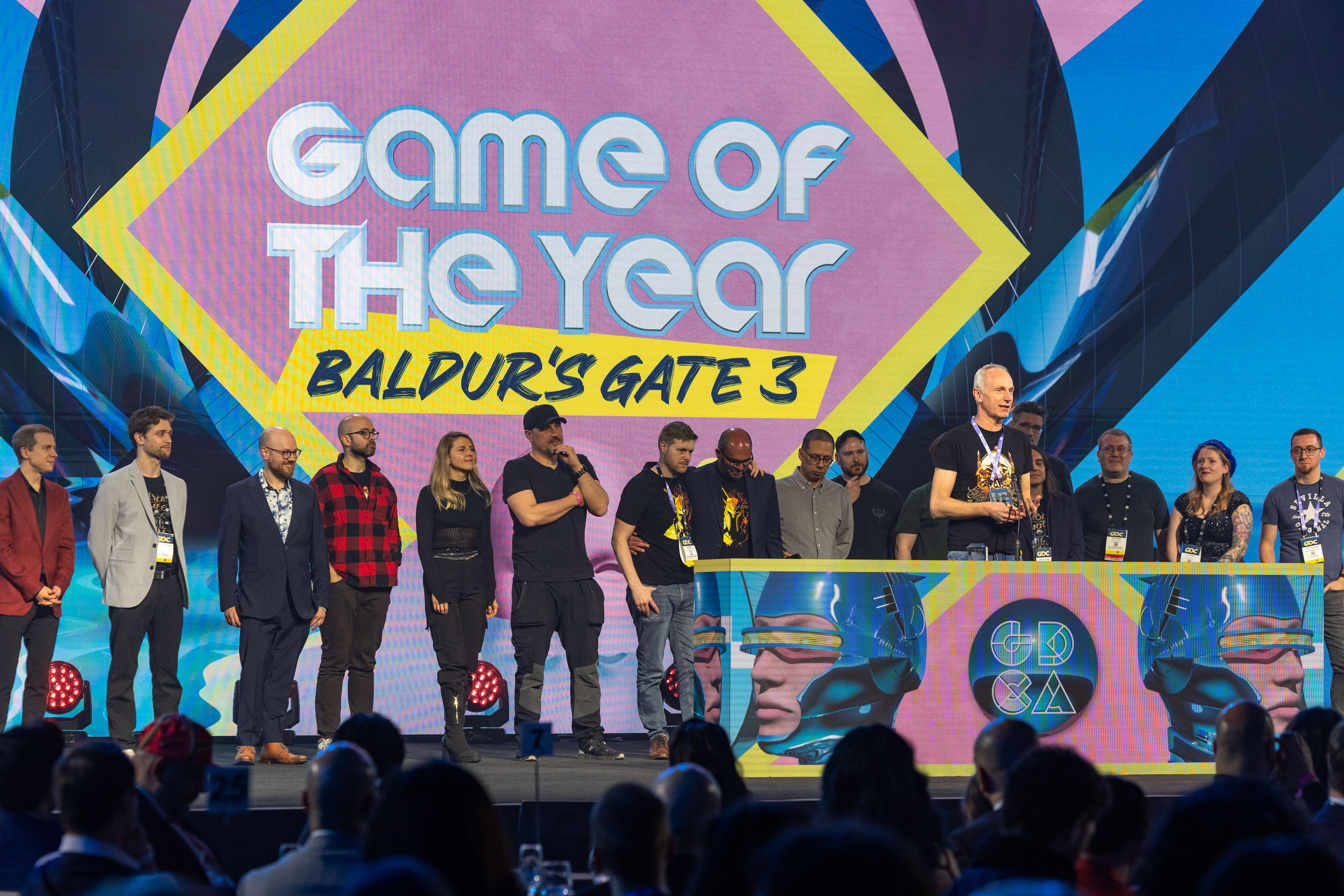
Baldur's Gate 3 won the Game of the Year Award, among others.

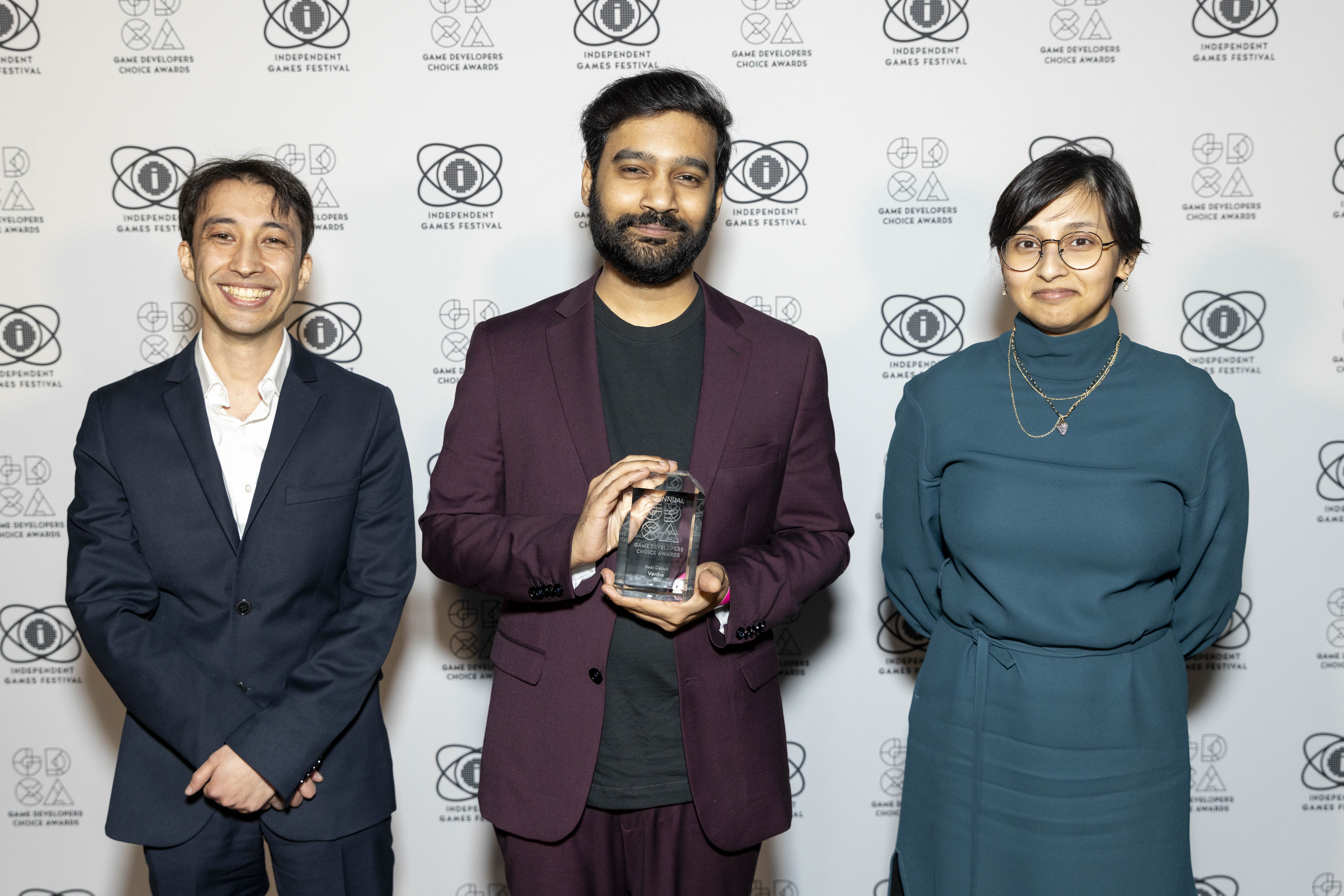
Visai Games won two awards for their work on Venba.

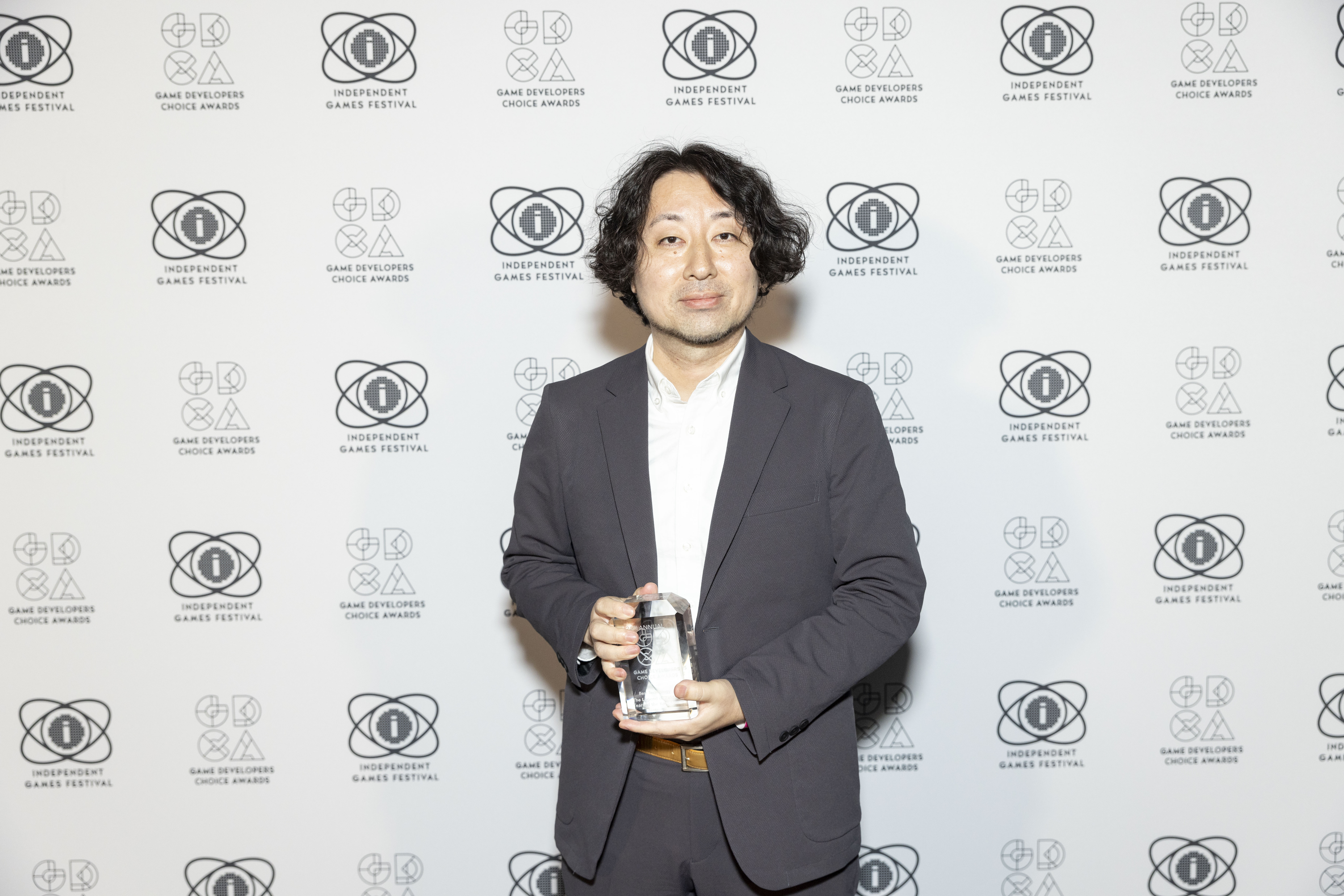
Takuhiro Dohta was representing Nintendo, which won two awards for The Legend of Zelda: Tears of the Kingdom.

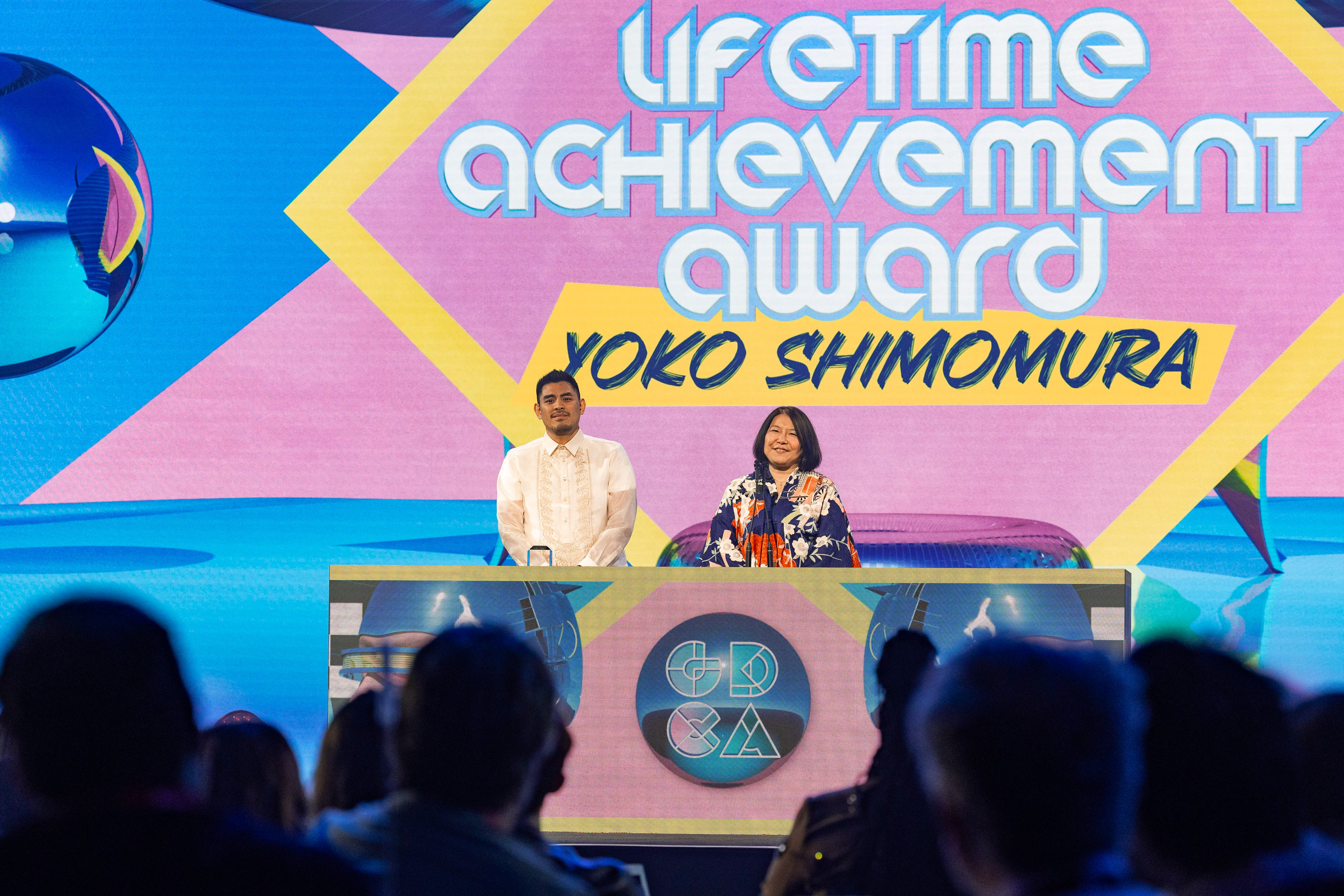
Yoko Shimomura won the Lifetime Achievement Award for her work as composer.

=== Game of the Year ===
- Baldur's Gate 3 (Larian Studios)
  - Cocoon (Geometric Interactive/Annapurna Interactive)
  - Dave the Diver (Mintrocket)
  - Dredge (Black Salt Games/Team17)
  - Marvel's Spider-Man 2 (Insomniac Games/Sony Interactive Entertainment)
  - The Legend of Zelda: Tears of the Kingdom (Nintendo)

=== Best Audio ===
- Hi-Fi Rush (Tango Gameworks/Bethesda Softworks)
  - Baldur's Gate 3 (Larian Studios)
  - Marvel's Spider-Man 2 (Insomniac Games/Sony Interactive Entertainment)
  - The Legend of Zelda: Tears of the Kingdom (Nintendo)
  - Venba (Visai Games)

=== Best Debut ===
- Venba (Visai Games)
  - Cocoon (Geometric Interactive/Annapurna Interactive)
  - Dave the Diver (Mintrocket)
  - Dredge (Black Salt Games/Team17)
  - Viewfinder (Sad Owl Studios/Thunderful Publishing)

=== Best Design ===
- Baldur's Gate 3 (Larian Studios)
  - Cocoon (Geometric Interactive/Annapurna Interactive)
  - Dredge (Black Salt Games/Team17)
  - Hi-Fi Rush (Tango Gameworks/Bethesda Softworks)
  - The Legend of Zelda: Tears of the Kingdom (Nintendo)

=== Innovation Award ===
- The Legend of Zelda: Tears of the Kingdom (Nintendo)
  - Baldur's Gate 3 (Larian Studios)
  - Cocoon (Geometric Interactive/Annapurna Interactive)
  - Hi-Fi Rush (Tango Gameworks/Bethesda Softworks)
  - The Making of Karateka (Digital Eclipse)

=== Best Narrative ===
- Baldur's Gate 3 (Larian Studios)
  - Alan Wake II (Remedy Entertainment/Epic Games)
  - Marvel's Spider-Man 2 (Insomniac Games/Sony Interactive Entertainment)
  - The Legend of Zelda: Tears of the Kingdom (Nintendo)
  - Venba (Visai Games)

=== Social Impact Award ===
- Venba (Visai Games)
  - A Space for the Unbound (Mojiken Studio/Toge Productions)
  - Assassin's Creed Mirage (Ubisoft Bordeaux/Ubisoft)
  - Baldur's Gate 3 (Larian Studios)
  - Terra Nil (Free Lives/Devolver Digital)

=== Best Technology ===
- The Legend of Zelda: Tears of the Kingdom (Nintendo)
  - Alan Wake II (Remedy Entertainment/Epic Games)
  - Baldur's Gate 3 (Larian Studios)
  - Marvel's Spider-Man 2 (Insomniac Games/Sony Interactive Entertainment)
  - Starfield (Bethesda Game Studios/Bethesda Softworks)

=== Best Visual Art ===
- Alan Wake II (Remedy Entertainment/Epic Games)
  - Cocoon (Geometric Interactive/Annapurna Interactive)
  - Final Fantasy XVI (Square Enix)
  - Hi-Fi Rush (Tango Gameworks/Bethesda Softworks)
  - The Legend of Zelda: Tears of the Kingdom (Nintendo)

=== Lifetime Achievement Award ===
- Yoko Shimomura, video game composer known for Final Fight, Street Fighter II, The King of Dragons, among others

=== Ambassador Award ===
- Fawzi Mesmar, creative director and game designer
