= List of Xbox One games (M–Z) =

This is a list of Xbox One games currently planned or released either at retail or via download. (Note: For a chronological list, click the sort button in any of the available region's columns. Games dated November 22, 2013 (North America and Europe) and September 4, 2014 (Japan) are launch titles for the specified regions.) See List of Xbox 360 & Xbox games for Xbox One for Xbox 360 & Xbox running on Xbox One with an emulator.

== List ==
There are currently 3157 games on both parts of this list. (Note: This number is always up to date by this script.)

| 360 / NS / PC Cross-play | K Kinect optional K required | HDR High Dynamic Range | PA Xbox Play Anywhere | X Xbox One X Enhanced | FPSB FPS Boost on Xbox Series X/S | XD Disc to Digital Licensing on XBOX |

| Title | Genre(s) | Developer(s) | Publisher(s) | Release date | | | Addons | Ref. |
| Title | Genre(s) | Developer(s) | Publisher(s) | JP | NA | PAL | Addons | Ref. |
|---|---|---|---|---|---|---|---|---|
| Mable & the Wood | Metroidvania | Graffiti Games | Triplevision | Sep 18, 2019 | Sep 18, 2019 | Sep 18, 2019 | | |
| Machinarium | Adventure | Amanita Design | Amanita Design | Apr 16, 2020 | Apr 16, 2020 | Apr 16, 2020 | | |
| Mad Games Tycoon | Strategy; simulation | Eggcode, Raylight Games | Toplitz Productions | Nov 12, 2019 | Nov 12, 2019 | Nov 12, 2019 | | |
| Madden NFL 15 | Sports | EA Tiburon | Electronic Arts | Aug 26, 2014 | Aug 26, 2014 | Aug 29, 2014 | | |
| Madden NFL 16 | Sports | EA Tiburon | Electronic Arts | Aug 25, 2015 | Aug 25, 2015 | Aug 27, 2015 | | |
| Madden NFL 17 | Sports | EA Tiburon | Electronic Arts | Oct 19, 2016 | Aug 23, 2016 | Aug 23, 2016 | | |
| Madden NFL 18 | Sports | EA Tiburon | Electronic Arts | Aug 24, 2017 | Aug 24, 2017 | Aug 24, 2017 | X | |
| Madden NFL 19 | Sports | EA Tiburon | Electronic Arts | Aug 10, 2018 | Aug 10, 2018 | Aug 10, 2018 | | |
| Madden NFL 20 | Sports | EA Tiburon | Electronic Arts | Aug 2, 2019 | Aug 2, 2019 | Aug 2, 2019 | | |
| Madden NFL 21 | Sports | EA Tiburon | Electronic Arts | Aug 28, 2020 | Aug 28, 2020 | Aug 28, 2020 | | |
| Madden NFL 22 | Sports | EA Tiburon | Electronic Arts | Aug 20, 2021 | Aug 20, 2021 | Aug 20, 2021 | | |
| Madden NFL 23 | Sports | EA Tiburon | Electronic Arts | Aug 19, 2022 | Aug 19, 2022 | Aug 19, 2022 | | |
| Madden NFL 24 | Sports | EA Tiburon | Electronic Arts | Aug 18, 2023 | Aug 18, 2023 | Aug 18, 2023 | | |
| Madden NFL 25 (2013) | Sports | EA Tiburon | Electronic Arts | Nov 22, 2013 | Nov 22, 2013 | Nov 22, 2013 | | |
| Madden NFL 25 (2024) | Sports | EA Tiburon | Electronic Arts | Aug 16, 2024 | Aug 16, 2024 | Aug 16, 2024 | | |
| Mad Max | Vehicular combat; action-adventure | Avalanche Studios | Warner Bros. Interactive Entertainment | Oct 1, 2015 | Sep 1, 2015 | Sep 4, 2015 | | |
| Mafia: Definitive Edition | Action-adventure; shooter | Hangar 13 | 2K Games | Sep 25, 2020 | Sep 25, 2020 | Sep 25, 2020 | | |
| Mafia III | Action-adventure; shooter | Hangar 13 | 2K Games | Oct 27, 2016 | Oct 7, 2016 | Oct 7, 2016 | X | |
| Magequit | Party | Bowlcut | Bowlcut | Unreleased | Oct 9, 2019 | Oct 9, 2019 | | |
| Mages of Mystralia | Adventure | Borealys Games | Borealys Games | Aug 24, 2017 | Aug 24, 2017 | Aug 24, 2017 | | |
| The Magic Circle: Gold Edition | Adventure | Question | Question | Unreleased | Jun 29, 2016 | Jun 29, 2016 | | |
| Magic: The Gathering – Duels of the Planeswalkers 2015 | Collectible card game | Stainless Games | Xbox Game Studios | Unreleased | Nov 5, 2014 | Nov 5, 2014 | | |
| Magical Brickout | Puzzle | Cunning Force Games | Cunning Force Games | Unreleased | Jun 29, 2018 | Jun 29, 2018 | | |
| Magnetic: Cage Closed | Puzzle; platformer | Guru Games | Gambitious Digital Entertainment | Unreleased | Aug 28, 2015 | Aug 28, 2015 | | |
| MagNets | Arena game | Total Monkery | Total Monkery | Unreleased | Mar 11, 2016 | Mar 11, 2016 | | |
| Mahjong | Puzzle | Sanuk Games | Bigben Interactive | Unreleased | Aug 29, 2016 | Aug 29, 2016 | | |
| Maid of Sker | Survival horror | Wales Interactive | Wales Interactive | Jul 28, 2020 | Jul 28, 2020 | Jul 28, 2020 | | |
| Maize | Adventure | Finish Line Games | Finish Line Games | Sep 11, 2017 | Sep 11, 2017 | Sep 11, 2017 | | |
| The Making of Karateka | | Digital Eclipse | Digital Eclipse | Aug 29, 2023 | Aug 29, 2023 | Aug 29, 2023 | | |
| Maldita Castilla EX | Action-adventure; platformer | Abylight Studios | Abylight Studios | Unreleased | Jul 20, 2016 | Jul 20, 2016 | | |
| Maneater | Action role-playing | Blindside Interactive | Tripwire Interactive | May 22, 2020 | May 22, 2020 | May 22, 2020 | | |
| Mantis Burn Racing | Racing | VooFoo Studios | VooFoo Studios | Oct 11, 2016 | Oct 11, 2016 | Oct 11, 2016 | PC X | |
| Manual Samuel | Adventure | Perfectly Paranormal | Curve Digital | Oct 13, 2016 | Oct 13, 2016 | Oct 13, 2016 | | |
| Marble Void | Platformer | Leveled Games | Leveled Games | Oct 3, 2017 | Oct 3, 2017 | Oct 3, 2017 | X | |
| Marenian Tavern Story: Patty and the Hungry God | Role playing, JRPG | Rideon | Kemco | May 22, 2019 | May 22, 2019 | May 22, 2019 | | |
| Maria the Witch | Adventure | Naps Team | Naps Team | Oct 31, 2017 | Oct 31, 2017 | Oct 31, 2017 | | |
| Mark of the Ninja | Stealth; action | Klei Entertainment | Klei Entertainment | Unreleased | Oct 9, 2018 | Oct 9, 2018 | X | |
| Marooners | Party; platform | M2H | M2H | Feb 6, 2018 | Feb 6, 2018 | Feb 6, 2018 | | |
| Mars: Chaos Menace | Shoot 'em up | Starcruiser Studio | BadLand Publishing | Mar 1, 2019 | Mar 1, 2019 | Mar 1, 2019 | | |
| Mars Horizon | Strategy; simulation | Auroch Digital | The Irregular Corporation | Nov 17, 2020 | Nov 17, 2020 | Nov 17, 2020 | | |
| Martha is Dead | Psychological horror | LKA | Wired Productions | TBA | TBA | TBA | | |
| Marvel Puzzle Quest: Dark Reign | Puzzle | WayForward Technologies | D3 Publisher | Feb 5, 2016 | Feb 5, 2016 | Feb 5, 2016 | | |
| Marvel: Ultimate Alliance | Action role-playing | Vicarious Visions | Activision | Jul 26, 2016 | Jul 26, 2016 | Jul 26, 2016 | | |
| Marvel: Ultimate Alliance 2 | Action role-playing | Vicarious Visions | Activision | Jul 26, 2016 | Jul 26, 2016 | Jul 26, 2016 | | |
| Marvel vs. Capcom: Infinite | Fighting | Capcom | Capcom | Sep 20, 2017 | Sep 20, 2017 | Sep 20, 2017 | PA X | |
| Marvel vs. Capcom Fighting Collection: Arcade Classics | Fighting; Beat 'em up | Capcom | Capcom | Feb 4, 2025 | Feb 4, 2025 | Feb 4, 2025 | | |
| Masquerada: Songs and Shadows | Tactical role-playing | Witching Hour Studios | Ysbryd Games | Aug 22, 2017 | Aug 22, 2017 | Aug 22, 2017 | | |
| Masquerade: The Baubles of Doom | Action-adventure | Big Ant Studios | Big Ant Studios | Apr 20, 2016 | Apr 20, 2016 | Apr 20, 2016 | | |
| Mass Effect: Andromeda | Action role-playing | BioWare | Electronic Arts | Mar 21, 2017 | Mar 21, 2017 | Mar 21, 2017 | | |
| Mass Effect Legendary Edition | Action role-playing | BioWare | Electronic Arts | May 14, 2021 | May 14, 2021 | May 14, 2021 | | |
| Massive Chalice | Turn-based tactics; real-time strategy | Double Fine Productions | Double Fine Productions | Jun 1, 2015 | Jun 1, 2015 | Jun 1, 2015 | | |
| Masters of Anima | Adventure | Passtech Games | Focus Home Interactive | Unreleased | Apr 10, 2018 | Apr 10, 2018 | X | |
| Matchpoint: Tennis Championships | Sports | Torus Games | Kalypso Media | 2022 | 2022 | 2022 | | |
| Max: The Curse of Brotherhood | Platformer; puzzle; side-scroller | Press Play | Xbox Game Studios | Sep 4, 2014 | Dec 20, 2013 | Dec 20, 2013 | | |
| Maximum Football 2018 | Sports | Canuck Play | Canuck Play | Unreleased | Jul 31, 2018 | Unreleased | | |
| Mayan Death Robots: Arena | Strategy | Sileni Studios | Daedalic Entertainment | May 19, 2017 | May 19, 2017 | May 19, 2017 | | |
| Mayhem Brawler | Beat 'em up | Hero Concept | Hero Concept | Unreleased | May 19, 2021 | May 19, 2021 | | |
| McDroid | Action-adventure | Elefantopia | Grip Digital | Unreleased | Mar 4, 2016 | Mar 4, 2016 | | |
| The Mean Greens: Plastic Warfare | Third-person shooter | Virtual Basement | Code Headquarters | Unreleased | Aug 5, 2020 | Aug 5, 2020 | | |
| Mechanika | Adventure | Mango Protocol | Mango Protocol | Unreleased | Nov 11, 2018 | Nov 11, 2018 | | |
| Mecho Tales | Side-scrolling action | Arcade Distillery | Arcade Distillery | Mar 13, 2020 | Mar 13, 2020 | Mar 13, 2020 | PA | |
| MechWarrior 5: Mercenaries | Vehicle simulation | Piranha Games | Piranha Games | May 27, 2021 | May 27, 2021 | May 27, 2021 | | |
| Mega Coin Squad | Platformer | Big Pixel Studios | Adult Swim Games | Unreleased | May 20, 2015 | May 20, 2015 | | |
| Mega Man 11 | Platformer | Capcom | Capcom | Oct 4, 2018 | Oct 2, 2018 | Oct 2, 2018 | X | |
| Mega Man Legacy Collection | Platformer | Digital Eclipse | Capcom | Aug 25, 2015 | Aug 25, 2015 | Aug 25, 2015 | | |
| Mega Man Legacy Collection 2 | Platformer | Digital Eclipse | Capcom | Aug 8, 2017 | Aug 8, 2017 | Aug 8, 2017 | | |
| Mega Man Star Force Legacy Collection | Role-playing; turn-based | Capcom | Capcom | Mar 27, 2026 | Mar 27, 2026 | Mar 27, 2026 | | |
| Mega Man X Legacy Collection | Platformer | Capcom | Capcom | Jul 24, 2018 | Jul 24, 2018 | Jul 24, 2018 | | |
| Mega Man X Legacy Collection 2 | Platformer | Capcom | Capcom | Jul 24, 2018 | Jul 24, 2018 | Jul 24, 2018 | | |
| Mega Man Zero/ZX Legacy Collection | Action; platformer | Capcom | Capcom | Feb 25, 2020 | Feb 25, 2020 | Feb 25, 2020 | | |
| Megaquarium | Strategy; simulation | Twice Circled | Auroch Digital | Dec 11, 2019 | Oct 18, 2019 | Oct 18, 2019 | | |
| Megaton Rainfall | Action | Pentadimensional Games | Pentadimensional Games | Aug 10, 2018 | Aug 10, 2018 | Aug 10, 2018 | PA | |
| Mekabolt | Platform | Somepx | Ratalaika Games | Aug 21, 2019 | Aug 21, 2019 | Aug 21, 2019 | | |
| Mekazoo | Platform | The Good Mood Creators | The Good Mood Creators | Nov 14, 2016 | Nov 14, 2016 | Nov 14, 2016 | | |
| Mekorama | Puzzle game | Martin Magni | Rainy Frog | Mar 26, 2020 | Mar 26, 2020 | Mar 26, 2020 | | |
| Melty Blood: Type Lumina | Fighting | French Bread | Delightworks | Sep 30, 2021 | Sep 30, 2021 | Sep 30, 2021 | | |
| A Memoir Blue | Interactive drama | Cloisters Interactive | Annapurna Interactive | Unreleased | TBA | TBA | | |
| Memories of Mars | Survival MMO | Limbic Entertainment | 505 Games | Unreleased | Mar 12, 2020 | Mar 11, 2020 | | |
| Meow Motors | Racing, Karting | ArtVostok | ArtVostok | Aug 2, 2019 | Aug 2, 2019 | Aug 2, 2019 | X | |
| Mercenary Kings | Action | Tribute Games | Tribute Games | Feb 6, 2018 | Feb 6, 2018 | Feb 6, 2018 | | |
| The Messenger | Metroidvania; platformer | Sabotage | Devolver Digital | Aug 30, 2018 | Aug 30, 2018 | Aug 30, 2018 | | |
| Metagal | Action; retro | Retro Revolution | Ratalaika Games | Mar 23, 2019 | Mar 23, 2019 | Mar 23, 2019 | | |
| Metal Gear Solid V: Ground Zeroes | Action-adventure; stealth | Kojima Productions | Konami | Sep 4, 2014 | Mar 18, 2014 | Mar 20, 2014 | | |
| Metal Gear Solid V: The Phantom Pain | Action-adventure; stealth | Kojima Productions | Konami | Sep 1, 2015 | Sep 1, 2015 | Sep 1, 2015 | | |
| Metal Gear Survive | Survival | Konami | Konami | Feb 20, 2018 | Feb 20, 2018 | Feb 22, 2018 | | |
| Metal Wolf Chaos XD | Third-person shooter | FromSoftware; General Arcade | Devolver Digital | Aug 5, 2019 | Aug 6, 2019 | Aug 6, 2019 | X | |
| Metaloid: Origin | Side-scrolling action | Retro Revolution | Totalconsole | Unreleased | Dec 11, 2019 | Dec 11, 2019 | | |
| Metamorphosis | Puzzle platformer | Ovid Works | All In! Games | Unreleased | Aug 12, 2020 | Aug 12, 2020 | | |
| Metrico+ | Platform; puzzle | Digital Dreams | Digital Dreams | Jan 20, 2017 | Jan 20, 2017 | Jan 20, 2017 | | |
| Metro Exodus | First-person shooter; survival horror | 4A Games | Deep Silver | Feb 22, 2019 | Feb 22, 2019 | Feb 22, 2019 | X | |
| Metro Redux | First-person shooter; survival horror | 4A Games | Deep Silver | Oct 14, 2014 | Aug 26, 2014 | Aug 29, 2014 | | |
| Metro: Last Light Redux | First-person shooter; survival horror | 4A Games | Deep Silver | Unreleased | Aug 26, 2014 | Aug 29, 2014 | | |
| Metropolis: Lux Obscura | Puzzle, Adventure | Ktulhu Solutions | Sometimes You | Dec 11, 2018 | Apr 3, 2018 | Apr 3, 2018 | | |
| The Metronomicon: Slay the Dance Floor | Music | Puuba | Akupara Games | Aug 29, 2017 | Aug 29, 2017 | Aug 29, 2017 | | |
| Micro Machines World Series | Racing | Codemasters | Koch Media | Apr 21, 2017 | Apr 21, 2017 | Apr 21, 2017 | | |
| Middle-earth: Shadow of Mordor | Action role-playing | Monolith Productions | Warner Bros. Interactive Entertainment | Dec 25, 2014 | Sep 30, 2014 | Oct 3, 2014 | | |
| Middle-earth: Shadow of War | Action role-playing | Monolith Productions | Warner Bros. Interactive Entertainment | Oct 10, 2017 | Oct 10, 2017 | Oct 10, 2017 | PA X | |
| Midnight Deluxe | Action | Petite Games | Ratalaika Games | Oct 24, 2018 | Oct 24, 2018 | Oct 24, 2018 | | |
| Mighty Morphin Power Rangers: Mega Battle | Action; Fighting | Bandai Namco | Bandai Namco | Jan 17, 2017 | Jan 17, 2017 | Jan 17, 2017 | | |
| Mighty No. 9 | Action; platformer | Comcept; Inti Creates | Deep Silver | Jun 24, 2016 | Jun 21, 2016 | Jun 24, 2016 | | |
| Mighty Switch Force! Collection | Puzzle-platformer | WayForward | WayForward | Jul 25, 2019 | Jul 25, 2019 | Jul 25, 2019 | | |
| Miles & Kilo | Platformer | Mike Burns | Four Horses | Mar 22, 2019 | Mar 22, 2019 | Mar 22, 2019 | PA | |
| Milo's Quest | Kids, action-adventure | Lightup | Ratalaika Games | Jan 29, 2020 | Jan 29, 2020 | Jan 29, 2020 | | |
| Mimic Arena | Multiplayer platform arena | Tiny Horse Games | Tiny Horse Games | Unreleased | May 18, 2016 | May 18, 2016 | | |
| Minecraft | Sandbox | Mojang | Xbox Game Studios | Sep 20, 2017 | Sep 20, 2017 | Sep 20, 2017 | NS PC | |
| Minecraft Dungeons | Dungeon crawler | Mojang | Xbox Game Studios | May 28, 2020 | May 28, 2020 | May 28, 2020 | | |
| Minecraft: Story Mode | Graphic adventure | Telltale Games; Mojang | Telltale Games | Unreleased | Oct 27, 2015 | Oct 30, 2015 | | |
| Minecraft: Story Mode - Season 2 | Graphic adventure | Telltale Games; Mojang | Telltale Games | Unreleased | Jul 11, 2017 | Jul 11, 2017 | | |
| Minecraft: Xbox One Edition | Sandbox | Mojang | 4J Studios | Sep 5, 2014 | Sep 5, 2014 | Sep 5, 2014 | | |
| Minesweeper Genius | Puzzle, Casual | MGaia | Blowfish Studios | Unreleased | Feb 12, 2019 | Feb 11, 2019 | X | |
| Mining Rail | Racing | WS Net | WS Net | Unreleased | Jun 1, 2018 | Jun 1, 2018 | X | |
| Mining Rail 2 | Racing | WS Net | WS Net | Unreleased | Sep 27, 2019 | Sep 27, 2019 | X | |
| Minit | Adventure | JW, Kitty, Jukio, and Dom | Devolver Digital | Apr 3, 2018 | Apr 3, 2018 | Apr 3, 2018 | | |
| Minoria | Action platformer | Bombservice | Dangen Entertainment | Sep 10, 2020 | Sep 10, 2020 | Sep 10, 2020 | | |
| Mirror's Edge Catalyst | Action-adventure; platform | EA Digital Illusions CE | Electronic Arts | Jun 9, 2016 | Jun 7, 2016 | Jun 9, 2016 | | |
| Missing: J.J. Macfield and the Island of Memories | Platformer | White Owls | Arc System Works | Oct 11, 2018 | Oct 11, 2018 | Oct 11, 2018 | | |
| Mitsurugi Kamui Hikae | Action | Zenith Blue | Zenith Blue | Nov 20, 2015 | Feb 16, 2016 | Feb 16, 2016 | | |
| MLB The Show 21 | Sports | San Diego Studio | Sony Interactive Entertainment | Apr 20, 2021 | Apr 20, 2021 | Apr 20, 2021 | | |
| MLB The Show 22 | Sports | San Diego Studio | Sony Interactive Entertainment | Apr 5, 2022 | Apr 5, 2022 | Apr 5, 2022 | | |
| MLB The Show 23 | Sports | San Diego Studio | Sony Interactive Entertainment | Mar 28, 2023 | Mar 28, 2023 | Mar 28, 2023 | | |
| MLB The Show 24 | Sports | San Diego Studio | Sony Interactive Entertainment | Mar 19, 2024 | Mar 19, 2024 | Mar 19, 2024 | | |
| Mochi Mochi Boy | Puzzle | Pixelteriyaki | Ratalaika Games | Jul 17, 2019 | Jul 17, 2019 | Jul 17, 2019 | | |
| Modern Tales: Age of Invention | Hidden object adventure | Orchid Games | Artifex Mundi | Unreleased | Apr 5, 2019 | Apr 4, 2019 | X | |
| Molecats | Puzzle | Vidroid | Vidroid | May 17, 2019 | May 17, 2019 | May 17, 2019 | X | |
| Momentum | Platformer | Projectile Entertainment | Projectile Entertainment | Unreleased | Aug 12, 2016 | Aug 12, 2016 | | |
| Momodora: Reverie Under the Moonlight | Action-adventure | Bombservice | Playism | Mar 17, 2017 | Mar 17, 2017 | Mar 17, 2017 | | |
| Momonga Pinball Adventures | Pinball | Paladin Studios; Seaven Studio | Plug In Digital | Unreleased | Dec 20, 2016 | Dec 20, 2016 | | |
| Monkey King Saga | Strategy | T-Rex Games | E-Home Entertainment | Apr 9, 2015 | Jun 15, 2016 | Jun 15, 2016 | | |
| Monkey Pirates | Action & Adventure | Henchmen Studio | Henchmen Studio | Unreleased | Oct 7, 2015 | Oct 7, 2015 | | |
| Monochroma | Platformer | Nowhere Studios | Nowhere Studios | Jun 24, 2016 | Jun 24, 2016 | Jun 24, 2016 | | |
| Monochrome Order | Role playing, JRPG | Hit Point | Kemco | Sep 4, 2019 | Sep 4, 2019 | Sep 4, 2019 | | |
| Monopoly Deal | Card & Board, Family | Asobo Studios | Ubisoft | Unreleased | Nov 18, 2014 | Nov 19, 2014 | | |
| Monopoly Madness | Card & Board, Family | Engine Software | Ubisoft | Dec 8, 2021 | Dec 9, 2021 | Dec 9, 2021 | | |
| Monopoly Plus | Card & Board, Family | Asobo Studios | Ubisoft | Unreleased | Nov 26, 2014 | Nov 26, 2014 | | |
| Monster Boy and the Cursed Kingdom | Platformer, Metroidvania | Game Atelier | FDG Entertainment | Unreleased | Dec 4, 2018 | Dec 4, 2018 | | |
| Monster Energy Supercross | Racing | Milestone srl | NA: Square Enix; EU: Milestone srl | Unreleased | Feb 13, 2018 | Feb 13, 2018 | X | |
| Monster Energy Supercross 2 | Racing | Milestone srl | Milestone srl | Unreleased | Feb 8, 2019 | Feb 8, 2019 | X | |
| Monster Energy Supercross 3 | Racing | Milestone srl | Milestone srl | Unreleased | Feb 4, 2020 | Feb 4, 2020 | | |
| Monster Hunter: World | Action role-playing | Capcom | Capcom | Jan 26, 2018 | Jan 26, 2018 | Jan 26, 2018 | X | |
| Monster Jam: Crush It! | Racing | Team-6 | GameMill Entertainment | Unreleased | Oct 24, 2016 | Oct 24, 2016 | | |
| Monster Jam: Steel Titans | Racing | Rainbow Studios | THQ Nordic | Unreleased | Jun 25, 2019 | Jun 25, 2019 | X | |
| Monster Jam: Steel Titans 2 | Racing | Rainbow Studios | THQ Nordic | Mar 2, 2021 | Mar 2, 2021 | Mar 2, 2021 | | |
| Monster Sanctuary | Role-playing; Metroidvania | Moi Rai Games | Team17 | Unreleased | Dec 8, 2020 | Dec 8, 2020 | | |
| Monster Slayers | Roguelike Card Battler | Nerdook Productions; Stage Clear Studios | Digerati | Unreleased | May 18, 2018 | May 18, 2018 | | |
| Monster Truck Championship | Racing | Teyon | Nacon | Oct 15, 2020 | Oct 20, 2020 | Oct 15, 2020 | | |
| Monster Viator | Role playing, JRPG | Hit Point | Kemco | Feb 5, 2020 | Feb 5, 2020 | Feb 5, 2020 | PA | |
| Monstrum | Horror | Junkfish | Soedesco | May 21, 2020 | May 22, 2020 | May 22, 2020 | | |
| Moonfall Ultimate | Action role-playing | Fishcow Studio | Wales Interactive | Unreleased | Sep 5, 2018 | Sep 5, 2018 | | |
| Moonlighter | Action role-playing | Digital Sun Games | 11 Bit Studios | Unreleased | May 29, 2018 | May 29, 2018 | PA | |
| Moons of Madness | Horror | Rock Pocket Games | Funcom | Mar 24, 2020 | Mar 24, 2020 | Mar 24, 2020 | | |
| The Mooseman | Adventure | Vladimir Beletsky; Mikhail Shvachko | Sometimes You | Unreleased | Jul 18, 2018 | Jul 18, 2018 | X | |
| Mordheim: City of the Damned | Strategy; simulation | Rogue Factor | Focus Home Interactive | Oct 17, 2016 | Oct 17, 2016 | Oct 17, 2016 | | |
| Morphite | Action & Adventure | Crescent Moon Games; We're Five Games | Blowfish Studios | Sep 20, 2017 | Sep 20, 2017 | Sep 20, 2017 | X | |
| Mortal Kombat 11 | Fighting | NetherRealm Studios | Warner Bros. Interactive Entertainment | Unreleased | Apr 23, 2019 | Apr 23, 2019 | X | |
| Mortal Kombat X | Fighting | NetherRealm Studios | Warner Bros. Interactive Entertainment | Apr 14, 2015 | Apr 14, 2015 | Apr 14, 2015 | | |
| Morkredd | Puzzle | Hyper Games | Aspyr | Dec 11, 2020 | Dec 11, 2020 | Dec 11, 2020 | | |
| Mothergunship | First person shooter, rouguelite | Terrible Posture Games | Grip Digital | Unreleased | Jul 17, 2018 | Jul 17, 2018 | | |
| Mosaic | Adventure | Krillbite Studio | Raw Fury | Jan 23, 2020 | Jan 23, 2020 | Jan 23, 2020 | X | |
| Moto Racer 4 | Racing | Microids | Kalypso Media | Jan 24, 2017 | Jan 24, 2017 | Jan 24, 2017 | | |
| MotoGP 15 | Racing | Milestone srl | Bandai Namco Entertainment | Oct 1, 2015 | Jun 24, 2015 | Jun 24, 2015 | | |
| MotoGP 17 | Racing | Milestone srl | Bandai Namco Entertainment | Jun 15, 2017 | Jul 11, 2017 | Jun 15, 2017 | | |
| MotoGP 18 | Racing | Milestone srl | Milestone | Jun 7, 2018 | Jun 7, 2018 | Jun 7, 2018 | | |
| MotoGP 19 | Racing | Milestone srl | Milestone | Jun 6, 2019 | Jun 6, 2019 | Jun 6, 2019 | HDR P | |
| MotoGP 20 | Racing | Milestone srl | Milestone srl | Apr 23, 2020 | Apr 23, 2020 | Apr 23, 2020 | | |
| MotoGP 21 | Racing | Milestone srl | Milestone srl | May 12, 2021 | Apr 22, 2021 | Apr 22, 2021 | | |
| Mount & Blade: Warband | Action role-playing | TaleWorlds Entertainment | TaleWorlds Entertainment | Sep 15, 2016 | Sep 15, 2016 | Sep 15, 2016 | | |
| Moving Out | Action; puzzle | DevM Games; SMG Studio | Team17 | Apr 30, 2020 | Apr 28, 2020 | Apr 28, 2020 | | |
| Moving Out 2 | Action; puzzle | DevM Games; SMG Studio | Team17 | Aug 15, 2023 | Aug 15, 2023 | Aug 15, 2023 | | |
| Mowin' & Throwin' | Party game | House Pixel | House Pixel | Nov 29, 2019 | Nov 29, 2019 | Nov 29, 2019 | | |
| Mr. Driller Drill Land | Puzzle | Bandai Namco | Bandai Namco | Nov 4, 2021 | Nov 4, 2021 | Nov 4, 2021 | | |
| Mr. Pumpkin's Adventure | Adventure | Cotton Game | E-Home Entertainment | May 17, 2017 | May 17, 2017 | May 17, 2017 | | |
| Mr. Shifty | Action | Team Shifty | TinyBuild | Aug 4, 2017 | Aug 4, 2017 | Aug 4, 2017 | | |
| Mugsters | Action Puzzler | Reinkout Games | Team17 | Unreleased | Jul 17, 2018 | Jul 17, 2018 | | |
| Mulaka | Action-adventure | Lienzo | Lienzo | Mar 2, 2018 | Mar 2, 2018 | Mar 2, 2018 | | |
| Mulletman and the Molemen | Action | Stevemata | Stevemata | Unreleased | Jan 18, 2019 | Jan 18, 2019 | | |
| The Mummy Demastered | Adventure | WayForward Technologies | WayForward Technologies | Oct 24, 2017 | Oct 24, 2017 | Oct 24, 2017 | | |
| Munchkin: Quacked Quest | Party game | Asmodee Digital | Asmodee | Nov 19, 2019 | Nov 19, 2019 | Nov 19, 2019 | PA | |
| Murder Miners | Arena shooter | Jforce | Jforce | Dec 27, 2019 | Dec 27, 2019 | Dec 27, 2019 | X | |
| Murdered: Soul Suspect | Adventure, Stealth | Airtight Games | Square Enix | Sep 4, 2014 | Jun 3, 2014 | Jun 6, 2014 | | |
| Mushroom Quest | Puzzle | Flying Islands Team | Xitilon | Dec 17, 2019 | Dec 17, 2019 | Dec 17, 2019 | | |
| Music Racer | Racing, music | AbstractArt; Light Road Games | Sometimes You | Jan 29, 2020 | Jan 29, 2020 | Jan 29, 2020 | X | |
| Must Dash Amigos | Racing, Party game | MiniBeast Games | MiniBeast Games | Aug 7, 2019 | Aug 7, 2019 | Aug 7, 2019 | | |
| Mutant Football League | Action, Sports | Digital Dreams Entertainment | Digital Dreams Entertainment | Unreleased | Jan 19, 2018 | Jan 19, 2018 | | |
| Mutant Year Zero: Road to Eden | Strategy, Turn-based tactics | The Bearded Ladies | Funcom | Unreleased | Dec 4, 2018 | Dec 4, 2018 | | |
| MX Nitro | Racing | Saber Interactive | Miniclip Games | Unreleased | Feb 14, 2017 | Feb 14, 2017 | | |
| MX Nitro: Unleashed | Racing | Saber Interactive | Mad Dog Games | Unreleased | Feb 27, 2020 | Feb 27, 2020 | | |
| MX vs. ATV: All Out | Racing | Rainbow Studios | THQ Nordic | Mar 23, 2018 | Mar 23, 2018 | Mar 23, 2018 | | |
| MX vs. ATV Legends | Racing | Rainbow Studios | THQ Nordic | TBA | TBA | TBA | | |
| MX vs. ATV Supercross Encore | Racing | Rainbow Studios | Nordic Games | Oct 27, 2015 | Oct 27, 2015 | Oct 27, 2015 | | |
| MXGP 2 | Racing | Milestone srl | Milestone srl | Jun 21, 2016 | Jun 21, 2016 | Jun 21, 2016 | | |
| MXGP 2019 | Racing | Milestone srl | Milestone srl | Unreleased | Aug 27, 2019 | Aug 26, 2019 | | |
| MXGP 2020 | Racing | Milestone srl | Milestone srl | Unreleased | Dec 16, 2020 | Dec 16, 2020 | | |
| MXGP 3 | Racing | Milestone srl | Milestone srl | Jun 20, 2017 | Jun 20, 2017 | Jun 20, 2017 | | |
| MXGP Pro | Racing | Milestone srl | Milestone srl | Jul 10, 2018 | Jul 10, 2018 | Jul 10, 2018 | | |
| My Big Sister | Adventure, Horror | Stranga Games | Ratalaika Games | Unreleased | May 7, 2019 | May 7, 2019 | | |
| My Brother Rabbit | Adventure | Artifex Mundi | Artifex Mundi | Sep 20, 2018 | Sep 21, 2018 | Sep 20, 2018 | X | |
| My Friend Pedro | Side-scrolling shooter | Deadtoast | Devolver Digital | Dec 5, 2019 | Dec 5, 2019 | Dec 5, 2019 | | |
| My Hero: One's Justice | Fighting | Byking | Bandai Namco Entertainment | Aug 23, 2018 | Oct 26, 2018 | Oct 26, 2018 | | |
| My Hero: One's Justice 2 | Fighting | Bandai Namco Entertainment | Bandai Namco Entertainment | Mar 12, 2020 | Mar 13, 2020 | Mar 13, 2020 | | |
| My Little Riding Champion | Kids and Family, Sports | Caipirinha Games | Bigben Interactive | Unreleased | Nov 29, 2018 | Nov 29, 2018 | X | |
| My Memory of Us | Puzzle-platformer, Stealth | Crunching Koalas; Juggler Games | Imgn Pro | Oct 10, 2018 | Oct 10, 2018 | Oct 10, 2018 | | |
| My Time at Portia | Role-playing, Simulation | Pathea Games | Team17 | Apr 16, 2019 | Apr 16, 2019 | Apr 16, 2019 | | |
| My Time at Sandrock | Role-playing, Simulation | Pathea Games | Pathea Games | Nov 2, 2023 | Nov 2, 2023 | Nov 2, 2023 | | |
| Myst | First-Person, Puzzle | Cyan Worlds | Cyan Worlds | Aug 26, 2021 | Aug 26, 2021 | Aug 26, 2021 | | |
| Mystery Castle | Action-adventure, Puzzle | Runestone Games | Runestone Games | Unreleased | May 6, 2016 | May 6, 2016 | | |
| Mystik Belle | Action-adventure | Last Dimension | WayForward Technologies | Unreleased | Oct 2, 2017 | Oct 2, 2017 | | |
| N++ | Platform | Metanet Software | Metanet Software | Oct 4, 2017 | Oct 4, 2017 | Oct 4, 2017 | | |
| Naraka: Bladepoint | Action-Adventure | 24 Entertainment | NetEase Game, ThunderFire Universe X Studio | Dec 22, 2022 | Dec 22, 2022 | Dec 22, 2022 | | |
| Narcos: Rise of the Cartels | Turn based strategy, Tactics | Kuju | Curve Digital | Unreleased | Nov 22, 2019 | Nov 22, 2019 | X | |
| Narcosis | Survival horror | Honor Code | Honor Code | May 10, 2017 | May 10, 2017 | May 10, 2017 | | |
| Narita Boy | Action-adventure | Studio Koba | Team17 | Mar 30, 2021 | Mar 30, 2021 | Mar 30, 2021 | | |
| Naruto: Ultimate Ninja Storm | Fighting | CyberConnect2 | Bandai Namco Entertainment | Aug 25, 2017 | Aug 25, 2017 | Aug 25, 2017 | | |
| Naruto Shippuden: Ultimate Ninja Storm 2 | Fighting | CyberConnect2 | Bandai Namco Entertainment | Aug 25, 2017 | Aug 25, 2017 | Aug 25, 2017 | | |
| Naruto Shippuden: Ultimate Ninja Storm 3 | Fighting | CyberConnect2 | Bandai Namco Entertainment | Aug 25, 2017 | Aug 25, 2017 | Aug 25, 2017 | | |
| Naruto Shippuden: Ultimate Ninja Storm 4 | Fighting | CyberConnect2 | Bandai Namco Entertainment | Feb 4, 2016 | Feb 9, 2016 | Feb 5, 2016 | | |
| Naruto to Boruto: Shinobi Striker | Fighting | Soleil | Bandai Namco Entertainment | Aug 31, 2018 | Aug 31, 2018 | Aug 31, 2018 | | |
| NASCAR Heat Evolution | Racing, sports | Monster Games | 704Games | Unreleased | Sep 13, 2016 | Nov 7, 2016 | | |
| NASCAR Heat 2 | Racing, sports | Monster Games | 704Games | Unreleased | Sep 12, 2017 | Sep 12, 2017 | | |
| NASCAR Heat 3 | Racing, sports | Monster Games | 704Games | Unreleased | Sep 7, 2018 | Sep 7, 2018 | | |
| NASCAR Heat 4 | Racing, sports | Monster Games | 704Games | Sep 12, 2019 | Sep 13, 2019 | Sep 13, 2019 | | |
| Natsuki Chronicles | Shoot 'em up | Qute Corporation | Qute Corporation | Dec 25, 2019 | Dec 25, 2019 | Dec 25, 2019 | | |
| NBA 2K14 | Sports | Visual Concepts | 2K Sports | Nov 22, 2013 | Nov 22, 2013 | Nov 22, 2013 | | |
| NBA 2K15 | Sports | Visual Concepts | 2K Sports | Nov 27, 2014 | Oct 10, 2014 | Oct 10, 2014 | | |
| NBA 2K16 | Sports | Visual Concepts | 2K Sports | Oct 29, 2015 | Sep 28, 2015 | Sep 28, 2015 | | |
| NBA 2K17 | Sports | Visual Concepts | 2K Sports | Sep 20, 2016 | Sep 20, 2016 | Sep 20, 2016 | | |
| NBA 2K18 | Sports | Visual Concepts | 2K Sports | Sep 15, 2017 | Sep 15, 2017 | Sep 15, 2017 | X | |
| NBA 2K19 | Sports | Visual Concepts | 2K Sports | Sep 7, 2018 | Sep 7, 2018 | Sep 7, 2018 | X | |
| NBA 2K20 | Sports | Visual Concepts | 2K Sports | Sep 6, 2019 | Sep 6, 2019 | Sep 6, 2019 | X | |
| NBA 2K21 | Sports | Visual Concepts | 2K Sports | Sep 4, 2020 | Sep 4, 2020 | Sep 4, 2020 | X | |
| NBA 2K22 | Sports | Visual Concepts | 2K Sports | Sep 10, 2021 | Sep 10, 2021 | Sep 10, 2021 | | |
| NBA 2K23 | Sports | Visual Concepts | 2K Sports | Sep 9, 2022 | Sep 9, 2022 | Sep 9, 2022 | | |
| NBA 2K24 | Sports | Visual Concepts | 2K Sports | Sep 8, 2023 | Sep 8, 2023 | Sep 8, 2023 | | |
| NBA 2K25 | Sports | Visual Concepts | 2K Sports | Sep 6, 2024 | Sep 6, 2024 | Sep 6, 2024 | | |
| NBA 2K26 | Sports | Visual Concepts | 2K Sports | Sep 5, 2025 | Sep 5, 2025 | Sep 5, 2025 | | |
| NBA 2K Playgrounds 2 | Sports | Saber Interactive | 2K Games | Oct 16, 2017 | Oct 16, 2017 | Oct 16, 2017 | | |
| NBA Live 14 | Sports | EA Tiburon | Electronic Arts | Nov 22, 2013 | Nov 22, 2013 | Nov 22, 2013 | | |
| NBA Live 15 | Sports | EA Tiburon | Electronic Arts | Oct 28, 2014 | Oct 28, 2014 | Oct 28, 2014 | | |
| NBA Live 16 | Sports | EA Tiburon | Electronic Arts | Oct 1, 2015 | Sep 29, 2015 | Oct 1, 2015 | | |
| NBA Live 18 | Sports | EA Tiburon | Electronic Arts | Sep 15, 2017 | Sep 15, 2017 | Sep 15, 2017 | X | |
| NBA Live 19 | Sports | EA Tiburon | Electronic Arts | Sep 7, 2018 | Sep 7, 2018 | Sep 7, 2018 | X | |
| NBA Playgrounds | Sports | Saber Interactive | Mad Dog Games | Unreleased | May 9, 2017 | May 9, 2017 | | |
| Nebulous | Puzzle | Namazu Studios | Namazu Studios | Unreleased | Nov 15, 2016 | Nov 15, 2016 | | |
| Necromunda: Hired Gun | First-person shooter | Streum On Studio | Focus Home Interactive | Unreleased | Jun 1, 2021 | Jun 1, 2021 | | |
| Necromunda: Underhive Wars | Turn-based strategy | Rogue Factor | Focus Home Interactive | Sep 8, 2020 | Sep 8, 2020 | Sep 8, 2020 | | |
| Necropolis | Action role-playing | Harebrained Schemes | Bandai Namco Entertainment | Oct 3, 2016 | Oct 3, 2016 | Oct 3, 2016 | | |
| Need for Speed | Racing | Ghost Games | Electronic Arts | Nov 12, 2015 | Nov 3, 2015 | Nov 5, 2015 | | |
| Need for Speed Heat | Racing | Ghost Games | Electronic Arts | Nov 7, 2019 | Nov 8, 2019 | Nov 7, 2019 | X | |
| Need for Speed: Hot Pursuit Remastered | Racing | Criterion Games | Electronic Arts | Nov 6, 2020 | Nov 6, 2020 | Nov 6, 2020 | | |
| Need for Speed Payback | Racing | Ghost Games | Electronic Arts | Nov 10, 2017 | Nov 10, 2017 | Nov 10, 2017 | X | |
| Need for Speed Rivals | Racing | Ghost Games | Electronic Arts | Sep 4, 2014 | Nov 22, 2013 | Nov 22, 2013 | | |
| Nefarious | Action-platformer | Stage Clear Studios; Starblade | Digerati | Unreleased | Sep 13, 2018 | Sep 13, 2018 | | |
| Neighborhorde | Action; shooter | Fermenter Games | Fermenter Games | Jun 6, 2017 | Jun 6, 2017 | Jun 6, 2017 | | |
| Neon Abyss | Action; roguelite; shooter | Veewo Games | Team17 | Jul 14, 2020 | Jul 14, 2020 | Jul 14, 2020 | | |
| Neon City Riders | Action-adventure, retro | Mecha Studios | Bromio | Unreleased | Mar 12, 2020 | Mar 12, 2020 | | |
| Neon Chrome | Shooter | 10tons | 10tons | Unreleased | Jun 8, 2016 | Jun 8, 2016 | X | |
| Neon Junctions | First-person puzzle | 9 Eyes Game Studio | Ratalaika Games | Jun 5, 2019 | Jun 5, 2019 | Jun 5, 2019 | | |
| Neonwall | Puzzle | Neorain | JanduSoft | Unreleased | Sep 13, 2018 | Sep 13, 2018 | | |
| NeoSprint | Racing | Headless Chicken | Atari | Jun 27, 2024 | Jun 27, 2024 | Jun 27, 2024 | | |
| Neptunia: Sisters VS Sisters | Role-playing | Compile Heart | Idea Factory | May 21, 2024 | May 21, 2024 | May 21, 2024 | | |
| Nerf Legends | First-person shooter | Fun Labs | GameMill Entertainment | Unreleased | Nov 19, 2021 | Nov 19, 2021 | | |
| Nero | Visual novel | Storm in a Teacup | Storm in a Teacup | Unreleased | May 15, 2015 | May 15, 2015 | | |
| NeuroBloxs | Arcade puzzle | Dighentis | Dighentis | Unreleased | Nov 21, 2018 | Nov 21, 2018 | X | |
| NeuroVoider | Shooter | Flying Oak Games | Plug In Digital | Unreleased | Mar 16, 2017 | Mar 16, 2017 | | |
| Nevermind | Adventure | Flying Mollusk | Flying Mollusk | Jan 11, 2017 | Jan 11, 2017 | Jan 11, 2017 | | |
| Neverout | First person puzzle game | Gamedust | Gamedust | May 27, 2019 | May 28, 2019 | May 27, 2019 | PA X | |
| Neverwinter Nights: Enhanced Edition | Role-playing | BioWare | Skybound Games | Dec 3, 2019 | Dec 3, 2019 | Dec 3, 2019 | | |
| New Super Lucky's Tale | Platform | Playful Studios | Playful Studios | Aug 21, 2020 | Aug 21, 2020 | Aug 21, 2020 | FPSB | |
| Newt One | Platformer | Devnari | Whitethorn Digital | Aug 30, 2019 | Aug 30, 2019 | Aug 30, 2019 | X | |
| Next Up Hero | Action RPG | Digital Continue | Aspyr | Unreleased | Jun 28, 2018 | Jun 28, 2018 | | |
| Never Alone | Platformer, puzzle, side-scroller | Upper One Games | Upper One Games | Nov 19, 2014 | Nov 19, 2014 | Nov 19, 2014 | | |
| NHL 15 | Sports | EA Canada | Electronic Arts | Unreleased | Sep 9, 2014 | Sep 12, 2014 | | |
| NHL 16 | Sports | EA Canada | Electronic Arts | Unreleased | Sep 15, 2015 | Sep 17, 2015 | | |
| NHL 17 | Sports | EA Canada | Electronic Arts | Sep 13, 2016 | Sep 13, 2016 | Sep 13, 2016 | | |
| NHL 18 | Sports | EA Canada | Electronic Arts | Sep 14, 2017 | Sep 14, 2017 | Sep 14, 2017 | X | |
| NHL 19 | Sports | EA Vancouver | Electronic Arts | Sep 11, 2018 | Sep 11, 2018 | Sep 11, 2018 | X | |
| NHL 20 | Sports | EA Vancouver | Electronic Arts | Sep 13, 2019 | Sep 13, 2019 | Sep 13, 2019 | X | |
| NHL 21 | Sports | EA Vancouver | Electronic Arts | Oct 16, 2020 | Oct 16, 2020 | Oct 16, 2020 | | |
| NHL 22 | Sports | EA Vancouver | Electronic Arts | Oct 15, 2021 | Oct 15, 2021 | Oct 15, 2021 | | |
| NHL 23 | Sports | EA Vancouver | Electronic Arts | Oct 14, 2022 | Oct 14, 2022 | Oct 14, 2022 | | |
| NHL 24 | Sports | EA Vancouver | Electronic Arts | Oct 16, 2023 | Oct 16, 2023 | Oct 16, 2023 | | |
| NHL 94 Rewind | Sports | Empty Clip Studios, EA Vancouver | Electronic Arts | Oct 30, 2020 | Oct 30, 2020 | Oct 30, 2020 | | |
| Nickelodeon All-Star Brawl | Fighting | Fair Play Labs; Ludosity | NA: GameMill Entertainment; EU: Maximum Games | Unreleased | Oct 5, 2021 | Oct 5, 2021 | | |
| Nickelodeon All-Star Brawl 2 | Fighting | Fair Play Labs | NA: GameMill Entertainment; EU: Maximum Games | Unreleased | Nov 7, 2023 | Nov 7, 2023 | | |
| Nickelodeon Kart Racers | Kart racing | Bamtang Games | NA: GameMill Entertainment; EU: Maximum Games | Unreleased | Oct 23, 2018 | Oct 26, 2018 | | |
| Nickelodeon Kart Racers 2: Grand Prix | Kart racing | Bamtang Games | NA: GameMill Entertainment; EU: Maximum Games | Unreleased | Oct 6, 2020 | Oct 6, 2020 | | |
| Nickelodeon Kart Racers 3: Slime Speedway | Kart racing | Bamtang Games | NA: GameMill Entertainment; EU: Maximum Games | Unreleased | Oct 7, 2022 | Oct 7, 2022 | | |
| Nidhogg 2 | Fighting | Messhof | Messhof | Unreleased | Jul 18, 2018 | Jul 18, 2018 | | |
| Nier: Automata | Action role-playing, hack and slash | PlatinumGames | Square Enix | Jun 25, 2018 | Jun 26, 2018 | Jun 26, 2018 | | |
| Nier Replicant ver.1.22474487139... | Action role-playing, hack and slash | Toylogic | Square Enix | Apr 22, 2021 | Apr 23, 2021 | Apr 23, 2021 | | |
| Niffleheim | Survival, Action role-playing | Ellada Games | Ellada Games | Sep 20, 2019 | Sep 20, 2019 | Sep 20, 2019 | X | |
| Night in the Woods | Adventure | Infinite Fall | Finji | Unreleased | Dec 12, 2017 | Dec 12, 2017 | | |
| Nightmare Boy | Platformer | The Vanir Project | BadLand Games | Oct 24, 2017 | Oct 24, 2017 | Oct 24, 2017 | | |
| Nightmares from the Deep: The Cursed Heart | Hidden Object puzzle | Artifex Mundi | Artifex Mundi | Unreleased | Sep 4, 2015 | Sep 4, 2015 | | |
| Nightmares from the Deep 2: The Siren's Call | Hidden Object puzzle | Artifex Mundi | Artifex Mundi | Unreleased | Aug 25, 2016 | Aug 25, 2016 | | |
| Nightmares from the Deep 3: Davy Jones | Hidden Object puzzle | Artifex Mundi | Artifex Mundi | Unreleased | Feb 2, 2018 | Feb 2, 2018 | | |
| Nine Parchments | Action | Frozenbyte | Frozenbyte | Mar 7, 2018 | Mar 7, 2018 | Mar 7, 2018 | | |
| Nine Witches: Family Disruption | Adventure | Indiesruption | Blowfish Studios | Unreleased | Dec 4, 2020 | Dec 4, 2020 | | |
| Ninja Gaiden: Master Collection | Action-adventure; hack and slash | Team Ninja | Koei Tecmo | Jun 10, 2021 | Jun 10, 2021 | Jun 10, 2021 | | |
| Ninja Pizza Girl | Platform, Parkour | Disparity Games | Disparity Games | Jul 20, 2016 | Jul 20, 2016 | Jul 20, 2016 | | |
| Ninja Shodown | Fighting | Bitmap Bureau | Rising Star Games | Oct 5, 2017 | Oct 5, 2017 | Oct 5, 2017 | | |
| Ninjin: Clash of Carrots | Beat 'em up | Pocket Trap | Modus | Sep 4, 2018 | Sep 4, 2018 | Sep 4, 2018 | | |
| Nippon Marathon | Racing, Sports | Onion Soup Interactive | PQube | Unreleased | Dec 18, 2018 | Dec 18, 2018 | | |
| No Man's Sky | Action-adventure, survival | Hello Games | 505 Games | Jul 24, 2018 | Jul 24, 2018 | Jul 24, 2018 | | |
| No More Heroes III | Action-adventure | Grasshopper Manufacture | Marvelous | 2022 | 2022 | 2022 | | |
| No Straight Roads | Action-adventure | Metronomik | Sold Out | Unreleased | Aug 25, 2020 | Aug 25, 2020 | | |
| No Time to Explain | Platform; action | TinyBuild | TinyBuild | Jul 17, 2015 | Jul 17, 2015 | Jul 17, 2015 | | |
| Noir Chronicles: City of Crime | Hidden object adventure | Brave Giant | Artifex Mundi | Nov 9, 2018 | Nov 9, 2018 | Nov 9, 2018 | X | |
| North | Walking Simulator | Outlands | Sometimes You | Mar 6, 2018 | Mar 6, 2018 | Mar 6, 2018 | | |
| Northgard | Real-time strategy | Shiro Games | Shiro Games | Unreleased | Sep 26, 2019 | Sep 26, 2019 | | |
| Not a Hero: Super Snazzy Edition | Action & Adventure | Roll7 | Team17 | Unreleased | May 24, 2016 | May 24, 2016 | | |
| Nova-111 | Action | Funktronic Games | Curve Digital | Aug 25, 2015 | Aug 25, 2015 | Aug 25, 2015 | | |
| Nuclear Throne | Twin-stick Shooter | Vlambeer | Vlambeer | Sep 9, 2020 | Sep 8, 2020 | Sep 9, 2020 | | |
| Null Drifter | Arcade; shoot 'em up | Panda Indie Studio; EastAsiaSoft | EastAsiaSoft | Apr 8, 2020 | Apr 8, 2020 | Apr 8, 2020 | | |
| Numantia | Strategy | Reco Technology | Reco Technology | Unreleased | Oct 31, 2017 | Oct 31, 2017 | | |
| Nutjitsu | Action | NinjaBee | NinjaBee | Unreleased | May 8, 2014 | Sep 22, 2014 | | |
| Obduction | Adventure | Cyan Worlds | Cyan Worlds | Apr 10, 2020 | Apr 10, 2020 | Apr 10, 2020 | X | |
| Obey Me | Action, hack & slash | Error 404 Game Studios | Blowfish Studios | Unreleased | Apr 21, 2020 | Apr 20, 2020 | X | |
| Obliteracers | Racing | Varkian Empire | Deck13 Interactive | Unreleased | Aug 26, 2016 | Aug 26, 2016 | | |
| Observer | Horror | Bloober Team | Aspyr Media | Unreleased | Aug 15, 2017 | Aug 15, 2017 | | |
| Observation | Adventure; puzzle | No Code | Devolver Digital | Jun 25, 2020 | Jun 25, 2020 | Jun 25, 2020 | | |
| Occultic;Nine | Visual novel | 5pb. | Mages | Nov 9, 2017 | Unreleased | Unreleased | | |
| The Occupation | First-person adventure, Stealth | White Paper Games | Humble Bundle | Unreleased | Mar 5, 2019 | Mar 4, 2019 | X | |
| Oceanhorn: Monster of Uncharted Seas | Adventure | Cornfox & Bros.; Engine Software | FDG Entertainment | Sep 7, 2016 | Sep 7, 2016 | Sep 7, 2016 | | |
| Octahedron | Platform | Demimonde | Square Enix | Mar 20, 2018 | Mar 20, 2018 | Mar 20, 2018 | | |
| Octodad: Dadliest Catch | Platform | Young Horses | Young Horses | Aug 26, 2015 | Aug 26, 2015 | Aug 26, 2015 | | |
| Octopath Traveler | Role-playing | Square Enix, Acquire | Square Enix | Mar 25, 2021 | Mar 25, 2021 | Mar 25, 2021 | | |
| Odallus: The Dark Call | Side scrolling action, Retro | Joymasher | Digerati | Dec 24, 2019 | Dec 24, 2019 | Dec 24, 2019 | | |
| Oddworld: New 'n' Tasty! | Puzzle platformer | Just Add Water | Oddworld Inhabitants | Mar 27, 2015 | Mar 27, 2015 | Mar 27, 2015 | | |
| Odium: To the Core | Action | 1-Dark Doo | 1-Dark Doo | Dec 26, 2018 | Dec 26, 2018 | Dec 26, 2018 | | |
| The Office Quest | Point & click adventure | 11Sheep | 11Sheep | Jan 22, 2020 | Jan 22, 2020 | Jan 22, 2020 | | |
| Offroad Racing: Buggy X ATV X Moto | Racing | Artefact Studio | Microids | Unreleased | Feb 4, 2020 | Dec 5, 2019 | | |
| Oh My Godheads | Fighting | Titutitech | Square Enix Collective | Dec 4, 2017 | Dec 4, 2017 | Dec 4, 2017 | | |
| Oh...Sir!! The Insult Simulator | Simulation | Vile Monarch | Vile Monarch | Aug 4, 2017 | Aug 4, 2017 | Aug 4, 2017 | | |
| OK K.O.! Let's Play Heroes | Action | Capybara Games | Cartoon Network Studios | Jan 23, 2018 | Jan 23, 2018 | Jan 23, 2018 | | |
| Ōkami HD | Action-adventure | Capcom | Capcom | Dec 12, 2017 | Dec 12, 2017 | Dec 12, 2017 | X | |
| Old Man's Journey | Adventure | Broken Rules | Broken Rules | Mar 4, 2019 | Mar 4, 2019 | Mar 4, 2019 | PA | |
| OlliOlli | Skateboarding | Carbon | Curve Digital | Mar 6, 2015 | Mar 6, 2015 | Mar 6, 2015 | | |
| OlliOlli2: Welcome to Olliwood | Skateboarding | Roll7 | Team17 | May 24, 2016 | May 24, 2016 | May 24, 2016 | | |
| Olija | Action-adventure | Skeleton Crew Studio | Devolver Digital | Jan 28, 2021 | Jan 28, 2021 | Jan 28, 2021 | | |
| Olympic Games Tokyo 2020 - The Official Video Game | Sports | Sega | Sega | Jun 22, 2021 | Jun 22, 2021 | Jun 22, 2021 | | |
| Omensight | Action murder mystery | Spearhead Games, Nephilim Game Studios | Digerati | Jun 7, 2019 | Jun 7, 2019 | Jun 7, 2019 | X | |
| Omno | Adventure | Studio Inkyfox | Studio Inkyfox, Future Friends Games | Jul 29, 2021 | Jul 29, 2021 | Jul 29, 2021 | | |
| OMORI | Role-playing | OMOCAT | Playism | TBA | TBA | TBA | | |
| On a Roll 3D | Platformer | Battenberg Software | Battenberg Software | Unreleased | Dec 7, 2018 | Dec 7, 2018 | PA X | |
| One Eyed Kutkh | Adventure, Puzzle | Baba Yaga Games | Sometimes You | Mar 9, 2018 | Mar 9, 2018 | Mar 9, 2018 | | |
| One Finger Death Punch 2 | Fighting, action | Silver Dollar Games | Silver Dollar Games | Feb 26, 2020 | Feb 26, 2020 | Feb 26, 2020 | | |
| One Hundred Ways | Puzzle | Sunlight Games | Sunlight Games | Oct 6, 2016 | Oct 6, 2016 | Oct 6, 2016 | | |
| One More Dungeon | First-person dungeon crawler roguelike | Stately Snail | Ratalaika Games | Unreleased | Aug 1, 2018 | Aug 1, 2018 | | |
| One Night Stand | Visual novel | Kinmoku | Ratalaika Games | Oct 2, 2019 | Oct 2, 2019 | Oct 2, 2019 | | |
| One Piece: Burning Blood | Fighting | Spike Chunsoft | Bandai Namco Entertainment | Apr 21, 2016 | May 31, 2016 | Jun 3, 2016 | | |
| One Piece: Pirate Warriors 4 | Platformer | Omega Force; Koei Tecmo | Bandai Namco Entertainment | Mar 26, 2020 | Mar 27, 2020 | Mar 27, 2020 | | |
| One Piece: World Seeker | Action-adventure | Ganbarion | Bandai Namco Entertainment | Unreleased | Mar 15, 2019 | Mar 15, 2019 | X | |
| One-Punch Man: A Hero Nobody Knows | Fighting | Spike Chunsoft | Bandai Namco | Feb 27, 2020 | Feb 28, 2020 | Feb 28, 2020 | | |
| The One We Found | Survival horror | Loveridge Designs | Loveridge Designs | Unreleased | Oct 31, 2018 | Oct 31, 2018 | | |
| Oniken | Retro, side-scrolling action | Joymasher | Digerati | Dec 24, 2019 | Dec 24, 2019 | Dec 24, 2019 | | |
| Onimusha: Warlords | Action-adventure | Capcom | Capcom | Dec 20, 2018 | Jan 15, 2019 | Jan 15, 2019 | | |
| Onirike | Platform | Devilish Games | Badland Publishing | Unreleased | Jun 29, 2021 | Jun 29, 2021 | | |
| Onrush | Racing | Codemasters | Codemasters | Jun 5, 2018 | Jun 5, 2018 | Jun 5, 2018 | | |
| oOo: Ascension | Action | Kenny Creanor | Extra Mile Studios | May 25, 2018 | May 25, 2018 | May 25, 2018 | | |
| Operencia: The Stolen Sun | Role-playing | Zen Studios | Zen Studios | Mar 29, 2019 | Mar 29, 2019 | Mar 29, 2019 | PA X | |
| Orangeblood | Role-playing | Grayfax Software | Playism | Oct 1, 2020 | Oct 1, 2020 | Oct 1, 2020 | | |
| Orbit | Shooter | 4Bit Games | 4Bit Games | Sep 30, 2015 | Sep 30, 2015 | Sep 30, 2015 | | |
| Ord. | Adventure | Mujo Games | Ratalaika Games | Nov 3, 2020 | Nov 3, 2020 | Nov 3, 2020 | | |
| Order of Battle: World War II | Computer wargame | The Artistocrats | Slitherine Software | Unreleased | Jun 23, 2021 | Jun 23, 2021 | | |
| Organic Panic | Platformer | Last Limb | Last Limb | Apr 1, 2016 | Apr 1, 2016 | Apr 1, 2016 | | |
| Ori and the Blind Forest | Metroidvania | Moon Studios | Xbox Game Studios | Mar 11, 2015 | Mar 11, 2015 | Mar 11, 2015 | | |
| Ori and the Will of the Wisps | Metroidvania | Moon Studios | Xbox Game Studios | Mar 11, 2020 | Mar 11, 2020 | Mar 11, 2020 | PA | |
| Our World is Ended | Visual novel | Red Entertainment | PQube | Feb 28, 2019 | Apr 18, 2019 | Apr 18, 2019 | | |
| Out of The Box: Xbox Edition | Life Sim, Puzzle | Nuclear Tales | Raiser Games | Unreleased | Sep 7, 2018 | Sep 7, 2018 | | |
| Outbreak | Survival-horror | Dead Drop Studios | Dead Drop Studios | Jun 16, 2017 | Jun 16, 2017 | Jun 16, 2017 | | |
| Outbreak: Epidemic | Survival-horror | Dead Drop Studios | Dead Drop Studios | Feb 12, 2020 | Feb 12, 2020 | Feb 12, 2020 | | |
| Outbreak: Lost Hope | Survival-horror | Dead Drop Studios | Dead Drop Studios | Jun 26, 2019 | Jun 26, 2019 | Jun 26, 2019 | | |
| Outbreak: The New Nightmare | Survival, Horror | Dead Drop Studios | Dead Drop Studios | Jan 2, 2018 | Jan 2, 2018 | Jan 2, 2018 | | |
| Outbreak: The Nightmare Chronicles | Survival, Horror | Dead Drop Studios | Dead Drop Studios | May 2, 2018 | May 2, 2018 | May 2, 2018 | X | |
| Outcast: Second Contact | Action Adventure | Appeal Studio | Bigben Interactive | Nov 27, 2017 | Nov 27, 2017 | Nov 27, 2017 | | |
| Outer Wilds | First person adventure | Mobius Digital | Annapurna Interactive | Unreleased | May 29, 2019 | May 29, 2019 | | |
| The Outer Worlds | Action role-playing | Obsidian Entertainment | Private Division | Oct 25, 2019 | Oct 25, 2019 | Oct 25, 2019 | | |
| Outlast | Survival horror | Red Barrels Studio | Red Barrels Studio | Jun 19, 2014 | Jun 19, 2014 | Jun 19, 2014 | | |
| Outlast 2 | Survival horror | Red Barrels Studio | Red Barrels Studio | Apr 25, 2017 | Apr 25, 2017 | Apr 25, 2017 | X | |
| Outriders | Third-person shooter | People Can Fly | Square Enix | Unreleased | Feb 2, 2021 | Feb 2, 2021 | | |
| Outward | Role-playing survival | Deep Silver | Nine Dots Studio | Unreleased | Mar 26, 2019 | Mar 26, 2019 | X | |
| Overcooked | Puzzle | Ghost Town Games | Team17 | Aug 3, 2016 | Aug 3, 2016 | Aug 3, 2016 | | |
| Overcooked 2 | Puzzle | Ghost Town Games | Team17 | Aug 7, 2018 | Aug 7, 2018 | Aug 7, 2018 | | |
| Overdriven Reloaded: Special Edition | Shoot 'em up | Toma Game Studio | Toma Game Studio | Feb 9, 2018 | Feb 9, 2018 | Feb 9, 2018 | PA | |
| Overkill's The Walking Dead | First-person shooter | Overkill Software | 505 Games | Nov 6, 2018 | Nov 6, 2018 | Nov 6, 2018 | | |
| Overland | Survival, Puzzle | Finji | Finji | Sep 19, 2019 | Sep 19, 2019 | Sep 19, 2019 | | |
| Overload | 6DoF Shooter | Revival Productions | Revival Productions | Unreleased | Mar 6, 2019 | Mar 5, 2019 | | |
| Overlord: Fellowship of Evil | Action & Adventure | Codemasters - Southam Digital | Codemasters | Unreleased | Oct 20, 2015 | Oct 20, 2015 | | |
| Overpass | Racing, simulation | Zordix Racing | Bigben Interactive | Feb 27, 2020 | Mar 17, 2020 | Feb 27, 2020 | | |
| Override: Mech City Brawl | Fighting | The Balance | Modus | Dec 4, 2018 | Dec 4, 2018 | Dec 4, 2018 | | |
| Override 2: Super Mech League | Beat 'em up | Modus Games Brazil | Maximum Games | Unreleased | Dec 22, 2020 | Dec 22, 2020 | | |
| Overruled! | Brawler | Dlala Studios | Team17 | Unreleased | Sep 15, 2015 | Sep 15, 2015 | | |
| Overwatch | First-person shooter | Blizzard Entertainment | Blizzard Entertainment | May 24, 2016 | May 24, 2016 | May 24, 2016 | X | |
| Overwatch 2 | First-person shooter | Blizzard Entertainment | Blizzard Entertainment | Unreleased | TBA | TBA | X | |
| Ovivo | Platformer | Izhard | Sometimes You | Jul 3, 2019 | Jul 3, 2019 | Jul 3, 2019 | X | |
| Owlboy | Platform-adventure | D-Pad Studio | D-Pad Studio | Apr 10, 2018 | Apr 10, 2018 | Apr 10, 2018 | | |
| Oxenfree | Action & Adventure | Night School Studio | Night School Studio | Unreleased | Jan 15, 2016 | Jan 15, 2016 | | |
| Pac-Man 256 | Arcade | Hipster Whale; 3 Sprockets | Bandai Namco Entertainment | Jun 21, 2016 | Jun 21, 2016 | Jun 21, 2016 | | |
| Pac-Man Championship Edition 2 | Arcade | Bandai Namco Entertainment | Bandai Namco Entertainment | Sep 12, 2016 | Sep 12, 2016 | Sep 12, 2016 | | |
| Pac-Man Museum + | Arcade | Bandai Namco Entertainment | Bandai Namco Entertainment | May 26, 2022 | May 27, 2022 | May 27, 2022 | | |
| The Padre | Survival horror | Shotgun with Glitters | Feardemic | Unreleased | Jun 27, 2019 | Jun 27, 2019 | | |
| Paladin | Shooter | Pumpkin Games | Pumpkin Games | Dec 7, 2017 | Dec 7, 2017 | Dec 7, 2017 | | |
| Paleo Pines | Farm life sim | Italic Pig | Modus Games | Sep 26, 2023 | Sep 26, 2023 | Sep 26, 2023 | | |
| Pandemic: The Board Game | Strategy | Asmodee Digital | Asmodee Digital | Aug 1, 2019 | Aug 1, 2019 | Aug 1, 2019 | | |
| Pang Adventures | Arcade, Action | DotEmu | DotEmu | Unreleased | Apr 19, 2016 | Apr 19, 2016 | | |
| Pankapu | Platformer, Adventure | Too Kind Studio | Plug In Digital | Sep 20, 2017 | Sep 20, 2017 | Sep 20, 2017 | | |
| Panzer Dragoon: Remake | Rail shooter | MegaPixel Studio | Forever Entertainment | Unreleased | Dec 11, 2020 | Dec 11, 2020 | | |
| Papa's Quiz | Party | Old Apes | Old Apes | Apr 2, 2021 | Apr 2, 2021 | Apr 2, 2021 | | |
| Paper Dolls Original | Horror | Beijing Litchi Culture Media | Gamera Game | Jul 10, 2019 | Jul 10, 2019 | Jul 10, 2019 | | |
| Paperbound Brawlers | Platform brawler, party game | Dissident Logic | Dissident Logic | Jan 10, 2020 | Jan 10, 2020 | Jan 10, 2020 | X | |
| Paper Trail | Puzzle | Newfangled Games | Newfangled Games | May 21, 2024 | May 21, 2024 | May 21, 2024 | | |
| Paradise Lost | Adventure | PolyAmorous | All in! Games | Mar 24, 2021 | Mar 24, 2021 | Mar 24, 2021 | | |
| Paradox Soul | Action & Adventure, metroidvania | Ritual Games | Ratalaika Games | Jul 7, 2019 | Jul 7, 2019 | Jul 7, 2019 | | |
| Parasol Stars: The Story of Bubble Bobble III | Platform | Taito | ININ Games | Unreleased | Jul 11, 2024 | Jul 11, 2024 | | |
| The Park | Action & Adventure | Funcom | Funcom | May 3, 2016 | May 3, 2016 | May 3, 2016 | | |
| Party Animals | Brawler; Party | Recreate Games | Source Technology | Sep 20, 2023 | Sep 20, 2023 | Sep 20, 2023 | | |
| Party Arcade | Party, Sports | FarSight Studios | FarSight Studios | May 8, 2019 | May 8, 2019 | May 8, 2019 | X | |
| Party Crasher Simulator | Simulation | Glob Games Studio | Glob Games Studio | TBA | TBA | TBA | | |
| Party Golf | Sports, party game | Giant Margarita | Giant Margarita | Jun 7, 2019 | Jun 7, 2019 | Jun 7, 2019 | X | |
| Party Hard | Strategy | Pinokl Games | TinyBuild | Apr 26, 2016 | Apr 26, 2016 | Apr 26, 2016 | | |
| Party Jousting | Party | Vikingfabian | Vikingfabian | Unreleased | Dec 4, 2018 | Dec 4, 2018 | X | |
| Past Cure | Action, Stealth | Phantom 8 Studio | Phantom 8 Studio | Unreleased | Feb 23, 2018 | Feb 23, 2018 | | |
| The Path of Motus | Puzzle-Platformer | MichaelArts | MichaelArts | Unreleased | Jul 17, 2018 | Jul 17, 2018 | | |
| Path of Sin: Greed | Hidden object adventure | Cordelia Games | Artifex Mundi | Aug 22, 2019 | Aug 23, 2019 | Aug 22, 2019 | | |
| Pathologic 2 | Adventure, Horror | Ice-Pick Lodge | TinyBuild | Dec 12, 2019 | May 23, 2019 | May 23, 2019 | | |
| Pato Box | Action, Sports | 2think Design Studio | Bromio | Unreleased | Aug 21, 2019 | Aug 21, 2019 | PA | |
| Paw Patrol: On a Roll | Kids, Action | Torus Games | Outright Games | Unreleased | Oct 23, 2018 | Oct 26, 2018 | | |
| Pawarumi | Shoot 'em up | Manufacture 43 | Manufacture 43 | Aug 21, 2019 | Jul 24, 2019 | Jul 24, 2019 | X | |
| Payday 2: Crimewave Edition | First-person shooter; tactical shooter | Overkill Software; Starbreeze Studios | 505 Games | Unreleased | Jun 16, 2015 | Jun 12, 2015 | | |
| PBA Pro Bowling | Sports | FarSight Studios | FarSight Studios | Oct 22, 2019 | Oct 22, 2019 | Oct 22, 2019 | X | |
| PC Building Simulator | Simulation | The Irregular Corporation | The Irregular Corporation | Aug 13, 2019 | Aug 13, 2019 | Aug 13, 2019 | PA | |
| Peaky Blinders: Mastermind | Action-adventure | FuturLab | Curve Digital | Unreleased | Aug 20, 2020 | Aug 20, 2020 | | |
| The Peanuts Movie: Snoopy's Grand Adventure | Platform | Beenox | Activision | Unreleased | Nov 3, 2015 | Nov 6, 2015 | | |
| The Pedestrian | Puzzle-platform | Skookum Arts | Skookum Arts | Unreleased | Jan 4, 2022 | Jan 4, 2022 | | |
| Peggle 2 | Puzzle | PopCap Games | Electronic Arts | Jan 13, 2015 | Dec 9, 2013 | Dec 9, 2013 | | |
| Penarium | Platformer | Self Made Miracle | Team17 | Sep 23, 2015 | Sep 23, 2015 | Sep 23, 2015 | | |
| Perception | Adventure; horror | Deep End Games | Feardemic | Jun 6, 2017 | Jun 6, 2017 | Jun 6, 2017 | | |
| Perfect Woman | Simulation | Peter Lu & Lea Schönfelder | Peter Lu & Lea Schönfelder | Sep 13, 2016 | Sep 13, 2016 | Sep 13, 2016 | | |
| Persian Nights: Sands of Wonders | Adventure; hidden object | Artifex Mundi | Sodigital | Unreleased | Aug 17, 2018 | Aug 17, 2018 | X | |
| The Persistence | Roguelike horror FPS | Firesprite | Firesprite | May 21, 2020 | May 21, 2020 | May 21, 2020 | | |
| Persona 3 Portable | Role-Playing | Atlus | Sega | Jan 19, 2023 | Jan 19, 2023 | Jan 19, 2023 | | |
| Persona 4 Golden | Role-Playing | Atlus | Sega | Jan 19, 2023 | Jan 19, 2023 | Jan 19, 2023 | | |
| Persona 5 Royal | Role-Playing | Atlus | Sega | Oct 21, 2022 | Oct 21, 2022 | Oct 21, 2022 | | |
| Petoons Party | Party game | Petoons Studio | Petoons Studio | Unreleased | Sep 27, 2019 | Sep 27, 2019 | | |
| Phantom Breaker: Omnia | Fighting | GameLoop; Mages | Rocket Panda Games | Mar 15, 2022 | Mar 15, 2022 | Mar 15, 2022 | | |
| Phantom Doctrine | Strategy, turn-based tactics | CreativeForge Games | Good Shepherd Entertainment | Unreleased | Aug 24, 2018 | Aug 24, 2018 | | |
| Phantom Dust | Action | Code Mystics | Xbox Game Studios | May 16, 2017 | May 16, 2017 | May 16, 2017 | PA | |
| Phantom Trigger | Role-playing | Bread Team | TinyBuild | Apr 20, 2018 | Apr 20, 2018 | Apr 20, 2018 | PA | |
| Phar Lap: Horse Racing Challenge | Sports | PikPok | Home Entertainment Suppliers | Unreleased | Mar 22, 2019 | Mar 22, 2019 | | |
| Pharaonic | Action role-playing | Milkstone Studios | Milkstone Studios | Jul 13, 2016 | Jul 13, 2016 | Jul 13, 2016 | | |
| Phoenix Point | Turn-based tactics | Snapshot Games | Snapshot Games | Unreleased | Jan 26, 2021 | Jan 26, 2021 | | |
| Phoenix Wright: Ace Attorney Trilogy | Adventure, visual novel | Capcom | Capcom | Feb 21, 2019 | Apr 9, 2019 | Apr 9, 2019 | | |
| Phoenotopia: Awakening | Action-adventure, platform, metroidvania | Cape Cosmic | Flyhigh Works | Aug 25, 2021 | Aug 25, 2021 | Aug 25, 2021 | | |
| Phogs! | Puzzle-platformer, adventure | Bit Loom Games | Coatsink | Unreleased | Dec 3, 2020 | Dec 3, 2020 | | |
| Pico Park 2 | Multiplayer action-puzzler | TECOPARK | TECOPARK | Sep 12, 2024 | Sep 12, 2024 | Sep 12, 2024 | | |
| Pier Solar and the Great Architects | Role-playing | WaterMelon Games | WaterMelon Games | Jun 5, 2015 | Nov 21, 2014 | Nov 21, 2014 | | |
| Pig Eat Ball | Arcade; puzzle | Mommy's Best Games | Mommy's Best Games | Oct 18, 2019 | Oct 18, 2019 | Oct 18, 2019 | | |
| Pikuniku | Platformer | Sectordub | Devolver Digital | Mar 12, 2020 | Mar 12, 2020 | Mar 12, 2020 | | |
| Pillar | Puzzle adventure | MichaelArts | MichaelArts | Unreleased | Sep 26, 2018 | Sep 26, 2018 | | |
| Pillars of Eternity: Complete Edition | Role-playing | Obsidian Entertainment | Paradox Interactive | Aug 29, 2017 | Aug 29, 2017 | Aug 29, 2017 | | |
| Pillars of Eternity II: Deadfire | Role-playing | Obsidian Entertainment | Versus Evil | Jan 28, 2020 | Jan 28, 2020 | Jan 28, 2020 | | |
| The Pillars of the Earth | Adventure | Daedalic Entertainment | Daedalic Entertainment | Aug 15, 2017 | Aug 15, 2017 | Aug 15, 2017 | | |
| Pilot Sports | Sports | Z-Software | Z-Software | Jul 31, 2019 | Jul 31, 2019 | Jul 31, 2019 | PA | |
| Ping Redux | Arcade | Nami Tentou Mushi | Nami Tentou Mushi | Oct 15, 2019 | Oct 16, 2019 | Oct 16, 2019 | X | |
| Pinstripe | Adventure, Puzzle | Atmos Games | Armor Games | Feb 7, 2018 | Feb 7, 2018 | Feb 7, 2018 | | |
| Pipe Push Paradise | Puzzle | Corey Martin; Stage Clear Studios | Digerati | Unreleased | Feb 8, 2019 | Feb 8, 2019 | | |
| Pirates of First Star | Adventure | Dynamic Voltage Games | Dynamic Voltage Games | Aug 27, 2019 | Aug 27, 2019 | Aug 27, 2019 | X | |
| Pit People | Turn based; adventure | The Behemoth | The Behemoth | Unreleased | Mar 2, 2018 | Mar 2, 2018 | | |
| Pix the Cat | Puzzle | Pasta Games | Neko Entertainment | Unreleased | Feb 8, 2017 | Feb 8, 2017 | | |
| Pixel Devil and The Broken Cartridge | Action, platform, retro | Level Evil | Victory Road | Dec 22, 2019 | Dec 23, 2019 | Dec 22, 2019 | | |
| Pixel Gladiator | Action-strategy | Flying Islands Team | Xitilon | Oct 25, 2019 | Oct 25, 2019 | Oct 25, 2019 | | |
| Pixel Heroes: Byte & Magic | Role-playing | The Bitfather | Headup Games | Unreleased | Feb 3, 2017 | Feb 3, 2017 | | |
| Pixel Piracy | Strategy | Quadro Delta; Abstraction Games | 505 Games | Unreleased | Feb 16, 2016 | Feb 17, 2016 | | |
| Pixel Story | Puzzle, Platform | Lamplight Studios | Rising Star Games | Unreleased | Feb 24, 2017 | Feb 24, 2017 | | |
| Pizza Titan Ultra | Action | Breakfall | Breakfall | Sep 26, 2018 | Sep 26, 2018 | Sep 26, 2018 | | |
| Plague Inc: Evolved | Turn-based strategy | Ndemic Creations | Ndemic Creations | Sep 18, 2015 | Sep 18, 2015 | Sep 18, 2015 | | |
| Plague Tale: Innocence | Stealth, Adventure | Asobo Studio | Focus Home Interactive | Unreleased | May 14, 2019 | May 14, 2019 | | |
| Plague Road | Role-playing | Arcade Distillery | Arcade Distillery | Unreleased | Dec 14, 2018 | Dec 14, 2018 | | |
| Planescape: Torment and Icewind Dale: Enhanced Editions | Role-playing | Black Isle Studios; Beamdog | Beamdog | Oct 14, 2019 | Oct 15, 2019 | Oct 14, 2019 | | |
| Planet Alpha | Platformer | Planet Alpha | Team17 | Unreleased | Sep 4, 2018 | Sep 4, 2018 | X | |
| Planet Coaster: Console Edition | Construction and management simulation | Frontier Developments | Frontier Developments | Nov 10, 2020 | Nov 10, 2020 | Nov 10, 2020 | | |
| Planet of the Apes: Last Frontier | Adventure | The Imaginati Studios | The Imaginarium | Unreleased | Aug 24, 2018 | Aug 24, 2018 | | |
| Planet of the Eyes | Puzzle, Platformer | Cococucumber | Cococucumber | Sep 11, 2017 | Sep 11, 2017 | Sep 11, 2017 | | |
| Planet Rix-13 | Adventure | 9 Eyes Game Studio | Sometimes You | Jan 16, 2019 | Jan 16, 2019 | Jan 16, 2019 | X | |
| Planetbase | Turn-based strategy | Madruga Works | Madruga Works | May 3, 2017 | May 3, 2017 | May 3, 2017 | | |
| Plants vs. Zombies: Battle for Neighborville | Third-person shooter | PopCap Games | Electronic Arts | Oct 17, 2019 | Oct 18, 2019 | Oct 17, 2019 | | |
| Plants vs. Zombies: Garden Warfare | Tower defense; third-person shooter | PopCap Games | Electronic Arts | Sep 4, 2014 | Feb 25, 2014 | Feb 20, 2014 | | |
| Plants vs. Zombies: Garden Warfare 2 | Tower defense; third-person shooter | PopCap Games | Electronic Arts | Feb 23, 2016 | Feb 23, 2016 | Feb 23, 2016 | | |
| PlayerUnknown's Battlegrounds | Battle royale | Bluehole | Xbox Game Studios | Sep 4, 2018 | Sep 4, 2018 | Sep 4, 2018 | X | |
| Please, Don't Touch Anything | Puzzle | ForwardXP | Four Quarters; Escalation Studios; ForwardXP | Feb 8, 2019 | Feb 8, 2019 | Feb 8, 2019 | X | |
| Plutobi: The Dwarf Planet Tales | Puzzle; action; adventure | Xiness | Xiness | Jun 1, 2017 | Jun 1, 2017 | Jun 1, 2017 | | |
| Pneuma: Breath of Life | First-person puzzle | Deco Digital | Deco Digital | Feb 27, 2015 | Feb 27, 2015 | Feb 27, 2015 | | |
| Poi | Platformer | PolyKid | PolyKid | Unreleased | Jun 27, 2017 | Jun 27, 2017 | | |
| Polychromatic | Shoot 'em up | Brushfire Games | Brushfire Games | Unreleased | Oct 2, 2015 | Oct 2, 2015 | | |
| PolyGod | Shooter | Krafted Games | Krafted Games | Unreleased | Aug 17, 2018 | Aug 17, 2018 | | |
| Pool Nation FX | Sports | Cherry Pop Games | Cherry Pop Games | Unreleased | Apr 1, 2015 | Apr 1, 2015 | | |
| Portal Knights | Role-playing | Keen Games | 505 Games | May 18, 2017 | May 18, 2017 | May 18, 2017 | X | |
| Post War Dreams | Action | Pulsetense Games | Kiss Publishing | Unreleased | Sep 4, 2019 | Sep 4, 2019 | | |
| Power Rangers: Battle for the Grid | Fighting | nWay | nWay | Unreleased | Mar 26, 2019 | Mar 26, 2019 | PC NS PS4 | |
| Powerstar Golf | Sports | Zoë Mode | Xbox Game Studios | Sep 4, 2014 | Nov 22, 2013 | Nov 22, 2013 | | |
| Praey for the Gods | Action-adventure; survival | No Matter Studios | No Matter Studios | Dec 14, 2021 | Dec 14, 2021 | Dec 14, 2021 | | |
| Premium Pool Arena | Sports | Iceflake Studios | Bigben Interactive | Feb 20, 2018 | Feb 20, 2018 | Feb 20, 2018 | | |
| Pressure Overdrive | Racing | Chasing Carrots | Chasing Carrots | Jul 26, 2017 | Jul 26, 2017 | Jul 26, 2017 | | |
| Prey | First-person shooter | Arkane Studios | Bethesda Softworks | May 18, 2017 | May 5, 2017 | May 5, 2017 | FPSB | |
| Prince of Persia: The Sands of Time Remake | Action-adventure; hack and slash | Ubisoft Pune; Ubisoft Munbai | Ubisoft | 2022 | 2022 | 2022 | | |
| Prince of Persia: The Lost Crown | Action-adventure; Metroidvania | Ubisoft Montpellier | Ubisoft | Jan 18, 2024 | Jan 18, 2024 | Jan 18, 2024 | | |
| Prison Architect | Simulation | Introversion Software | Double Eleven | Jun 28, 2016 | Jun 28, 2016 | Jun 28, 2016 | | |
| Pro Evolution Soccer 2015 | Sports | PES Productions | Konami | Nov 13, 2014 | Nov 11, 2014 | Nov 13, 2014 | | |
| Pro Evolution Soccer 2016 | Sports | PES Productions | Konami | Sep 15, 2015 | Sep 15, 2015 | Sep 15, 2015 | | |
| Pro Evolution Soccer 2017 | Sports | PES Productions | Konami | Sep 15, 2016 | Sep 13, 2016 | Sep 15, 2016 | | |
| Pro Evolution Soccer 2018 | Sports | PES Productions | Konami | Sep 14, 2017 | Sep 14, 2017 | Sep 14, 2017 | X | |
| Pro Evolution Soccer 2019 | Sports | PES Productions | Konami | Aug 28, 2018 | Aug 28, 2018 | Aug 28, 2018 | X | |
| Pro Fishing Simulator | Sports | Sanuk Games | Bigben Interactive | Unreleased | Feb 19, 2019 | Nov 29, 2018 | | |
| The Procession to Calvary | Point-and-click adventure | Joe Richardson | Digerati | Unreleased | Jul 2, 2021 | Jul 2, 2021 | | |
| Professional Farmer 2017 | Simulation | Visual Imagination Software | United Independent Entertainment | Unreleased | Jun 10, 2016 | Jun 10, 2016 | | |
| Project Cars | Sim racing | Slightly Mad Studios | Bandai Namco Entertainment | Feb 1, 2017 | May 12, 2015 | May 8, 2015 | | |
| Project Cars 2 | Sim racing | Slightly Mad Studios | Bandai Namco Entertainment | Sep 22, 2017 | Sep 22, 2017 | Sep 22, 2017 | X | |
| Project Cars 3 | Sim racing | Slightly Mad Studios | Bandai Namco Entertainment | Aug 28, 2020 | Aug 28, 2020 | Aug 28, 2020 | HDR P | |
| Project Highrise: Architect's Edition | Simulation; strategy | Somasim | Kalypso Media | Unreleased | Nov 13, 2018 | Nov 13, 2018 | | |
| Project Root | Shooter | OPQAM | Reverb Triple XP | Mar 25, 2015 | Apr 29, 2015 | Apr 29, 2015 | | |
| Project Spark | Sandbox | Team Dakota | Xbox Game Studios | Oct 9, 2014 | Oct 7, 2014 | Oct 10, 2014 | | |
| Project Starship | Shoot 'em up | Panda Indie Studio | EastAsiaSoft | Feb 12, 2020 | Feb 12, 2020 | Feb 12, 2020 | | |
| Prototype | Action & Adventure | Radical Entertainment/FunLabs | Activision | Aug 12, 2015 | Aug 12, 2015 | Aug 12, 2015 | | |
| Prototype 2 | Action & Adventure | Radical Entertainment; FunLabs | Activision | Aug 12, 2015 | Aug 12, 2015 | Aug 12, 2015 | | |
| Psycho-Pass | Visual novel | Nitroplus | 5pb. | May 28, 2015 | Unreleased | Unreleased | | |
| Psychonauts 2 | Platform | Double Fine Productions | Xbox Game Studios | Aug 25, 2021 | Aug 25, 2021 | Aug 25, 2021 | | |
| PUBG: Battlegrounds | Battle royale | PUBG Studios | Microsoft Studios | Dec 12, 2017 | Dec 12, 2017 | Dec 12, 2017 | | |
| Pumped BMX + | Sports; racing | Yeah Us! | Curve Digital | Unreleased | Sep 18, 2015 | Sep 18, 2015 | | |
| Pumped BMX Pro | Sports; racing | Warp Digital Entertainment | Curve Digital | Unreleased | Feb 7, 2019 | Feb 7, 2019 | | |
| Pumpkin Jack | Platformer | Nicolas Meyssonnier | Headup Games | Unreleased | Oct 23, 2020 | Oct 23, 2020 | | |
| Punch Club | Sports Management, Life Sim | Lazy Bear Games | TinyBuild | Mar 31, 2017 | Mar 31, 2017 | Mar 31, 2017 | | |
| Pure Chess | Chess | VooFoo Studios | Ripstone | Sep 9, 2016 | Sep 9, 2016 | Sep 9, 2016 | | |
| Pure Farming 2018 | Simulation | Ice Flames | Techland Publishing | Unreleased | Mar 13, 2018 | Mar 13, 2018 | | |
| Pure Hold'em | Sports | VooFoo Studios | Ripstone | Unreleased | Aug 21, 2015 | Aug 21, 2015 | | |
| Pure Pool | Sports | VooFoo Studios | Ripstone | Nov 14, 2014 | Nov 14, 2014 | Nov 14, 2014 | | |
| Purple Chicken Spaceman | Shoot 'em up | Holmade Games | Holmade Games | Unreleased | May 3, 2019 | May 3, 2019 | | |
| Puyo Puyo Champions | Puzzle | Sega | Sega | Unreleased | May 7, 2019 | May 6, 2019 | | |
| Puyo Puyo Tetris | Puzzle | Sonic Team | Sega | Dec 4, 2014 | Unreleased | Unreleased | | |
| Puyo Puyo Tetris 2 | Puzzle | Sonic Team | Sega | Dec 8, 2020 | Dec 8, 2020 | Dec 8, 2020 | | |
| Q | Puzzle | Liica | Liica | Jun 26, 2015 | Jun 26, 2015 | Jun 26, 2015 | | |
| Quantic Pinball | Pinball | Shine Research | Plug In Digital | Unreleased | Feb 9, 2018 | Feb 9, 2018 | | |
| Quantum Break | Third-person shooter | Remedy Entertainment | Xbox Game Studios | Apr 7, 2016 | Apr 5, 2016 | Apr 5, 2016 | X | |
| Quantum Replica | Stealth; action | ON3D Studios | PQube | Unreleased | May 13, 2021 | May 13, 2021 | | |
| Quantum Rush: Champions | Racing | GameArt Studio | GameArt Studio | Unreleased | Jun 19, 2015 | Unreleased | | |
| Quatros Origins | Puzzle | God As A Cucumber | God As A Cucumber | Unreleased | Jul 29, 2016 | Jul 29, 2016 | | |
| Quest of Dungeons | Turn-based roguelike | Upfall Studios | Upfall Studios | Sep 7, 2015 | Sep 7, 2015 | Sep 7, 2015 | | |
| Q.U.B.E.: Director's Cut | Puzzle | Toxic Games | Toxic Games | Jul 24, 2015 | Jul 24, 2015 | Jul 24, 2015 | | |
| Q.U.B.E. 2 | Puzzle | Toxic Games | Trapped Nerve Games | Mar 13, 2018 | Mar 13, 2018 | Mar 13, 2018 | PA | |
| Queen's Quest 2: Stories of Forgotten Past | Hidden object adventure | Brave Giant | Artifex Mundi | Feb 21, 2019 | Feb 22, 2019 | Feb 21, 2019 | X | |
| Queen's Quest 3: The End of Dawn | Hidden object adventure | Brave Giant | Artifex Mundi | Jun 13, 2019 | Jun 14, 2019 | Jun 13, 2019 | | |
| Queen's Quest 4: Sacred Truce | Hidden object adventure | Brave Giant | Artifex Mundi | Oct 10, 2019 | Oct 11, 2019 | Oct 10, 2019 | X | |
| Quern - Undying Thoughts | First person adventure | Zadbox | Zadbox | Unreleased | Apr 24, 2020 | Apr 24, 2020 | | |
| Quiplash | Party; trivia | Jackbox Games | Jackbox Games | Unreleased | Jun 30, 2015 | Sep 15, 2015 | | |
| Q*bert Rebooted | Arcade | GPC Games | Loot Interactive | Feb 12, 2016 | Feb 12, 2016 | Feb 12, 2016 | | |
| R.B.I. Baseball 14 | Sports | MLB.com | MLB.com | Unreleased | Jun 24, 2014 | Unreleased | | |
| R.B.I. Baseball 15 | Sports | MLB.com | MLB.com | Unreleased | Mar 31, 2015 | Unreleased | | |
| R.B.I. Baseball 16 | Sports | MLB.com | MLB.com | Unreleased | Mar 29, 2016 | Mar 29, 2016 | | |
| R.B.I. Baseball 17 | Sports | MLB.com | MLB.com | Unreleased | Mar 28, 2017 | Mar 28, 2017 | | |
| R.B.I. Baseball 18 | Sports | MLB.com | MLB.com | Unreleased | Mar 20, 2018 | Mar 20, 2018 | | |
| R.B.I. Baseball 19 | Sports | MLB Advanced Media | MLB Advanced Media | Mar 5, 2019 | Mar 5, 2019 | Mar 5, 2019 | | |
| R.B.I. Baseball 20 | Sports | MLB Advanced Media | MLB Advanced Media | Mar 17, 2020 | Mar 16, 2020 | Mar 24, 2020 | | |
| R.B.I. Baseball 21 | Sports | MLB Advanced Media | MLB Advanced Media | Mar 16, 2021 | Mar 16, 2021 | Mar 16, 2021 | | |
| Rabbids Invasion: The Interactive TV Show | Action | Ubisoft Barcelona | Ubisoft | Unreleased | Nov 18, 2014 | Nov 21, 2014 | K | |
| Race Arcade | Racing | Iceflake Studios | Iceflake Studios | Unreleased | Aug 4, 2017 | Aug 4, 2017 | | |
| Race the Sun | Racing | Flippfly | Flippfly | Apr 20, 2017 | Apr 20, 2017 | Apr 20, 2017 | | |
| Race With Ryan | Kart racing | 3D Clouds | Outright Games | Nov 1, 2019 | Nov 1, 2019 | Nov 1, 2019 | | |
| Rad | Action role-playing, roguelike | Double Fine Productions | Bandai Namco Entertainment | Unreleased | Aug 20, 2019 | Aug 20, 2019 | | |
| Rad Rodgers | Action, platform | Slipgate Studios | THQ Nordic | Unreleased | Feb 21, 2018 | Feb 21, 2018 | | |
| Rage 2 | First-person shooter | Avalanche Studios; id Software | Bethesda Softworks | May 14, 2019 | May 14, 2019 | May 14, 2019 | | |
| Rage of the Dragons | Fighting | QUByte Entertainment | QUByte Entertainment | TBA | TBA | TBA | | |
| Raging Justice | Beat 'em up | MakinGames | Team17 | Unreleased | May 8, 2018 | May 8, 2018 | | |
| Raid: World War II | Shooter | Lion Game Lion | Starbreeze Studios | Unreleased | Oct 10, 2017 | Oct 13, 2017 | | |
| Raiden V | Shoot 'em up | Moss | Moss | Feb 26, 2016 | May 11, 2016 | May 11, 2016 | | |
| Railway Empire | Simulation | Gaming Minds Studios | Kalypso Media | Unreleased | Jan 30, 2018 | Jan 30, 2018 | X | |
| Rain on Your Parade | Puzzle | Unbound Creations | Unbound Creations | Apr 15, 2021 | Apr 15, 2021 | Apr 15, 2021 | | |
| Rainbow Billy: The Curse of the Leviathan | Platform | ManaVoid Entertainment | Skybound Games | Unreleased | Oct 5, 2021 | Oct 5, 2021 | | |
| Raining Blobs | Puzzle | Endi Milojkoski | Black Shell Media | Unreleased | Dec 20, 2017 | Dec 20, 2017 | PA | |
| Rally Racers | Kart racing | West Coast Software | West Coast Software | Unreleased | Dec 14, 2018 | Dec 14, 2018 | | |
| Random Heroes | Action platformer | Woblyware Oy | Ratalaika Games | Apr 1, 2020 | Apr 1, 2020 | Apr 1, 2020 | | |
| Rare Replay | Compilation | Rare | Xbox Game Studios | Aug 4, 2015 | Aug 4, 2015 | Aug 4, 2015 | | |
| The Raven Remastered | Adventure | King Art | THQ Nordic | Unreleased | Mar 13, 2018 | Mar 13, 2018 | | |
| Rayman Legends | Platform | Ubisoft Montpellier | Ubisoft | Unreleased | Feb 18, 2014 | Feb 21, 2014 | | |
| Razed | Runner; platformer | Warpfish Games | PQube | Sep 14, 2018 | Sep 14, 2018 | Sep 14, 2018 | | |
| Read Only Memories: Neurodiver | Adventure | MidBoss | MidBoss | 2022 | 2022 | 2022 | | |
| Reagan Gorbachev | Action-adventure | Team2Bit | Team2Bit | Unreleased | Feb 24, 2016 | Feb 24, 2016 | | |
| Real Farm | Simulation | Soedesco | Soedesco | Oct 20, 2017 | Oct 20, 2017 | Oct 20, 2017 | X | |
| Realms of Arkania: Blade of Destiny | Role-playing | Crafty Studios; Kittehface Software | United Independent Entertainment | Unreleased | Oct 12, 2017 | Oct 12, 2017 | | |
| Realms of Arkania: Star Trail | Role-playing | Crafty Studios | United Independent Entertainment | Jan 30, 2019 | Jan 30, 2019 | Jan 30, 2019 | | |
| Rebel Cops | Strategy, Tactics | Weappy Studio | THQ Nordic | Unreleased | Sep 17, 2019 | Sep 17, 2019 | X | |
| Rebel Galaxy | Space flight simulator | Double Damage Games | Double Damage Games | Unreleased | Jan 13, 2016 | Jan 13, 2016 | | |
| Rebound Dodgeball Evolved | Sports, Party game | Hexterion | Hexterion | Sep 19, 2019 | Sep 20, 2019 | Sep 19, 2019 | | |
| Rec Room | Virtual world | Rec Room Inc. | Rec Room Inc. | Dec 3, 2020 | Dec 3, 2020 | Dec 3, 2020 | PC PS4 iOS OQ | |
| ReCore | Action-adventure | Comcept; Armature Studio | Xbox Game Studios | Sep 13, 2016 | Sep 13, 2016 | Sep 13, 2016 | PA X FPSB | |
| Record of Lodoss War: Deedlit in Wonder Labyrinth | Metroidvania | Team Ladybug; Why So Serious? | Playism | Dec 16, 2021 | Dec 16, 2021 | Dec 16, 2021 | | |
| Red Bow | Horror | Stranga Games, Grabthegames | Ratalaika Games | Jan 15, 2020 | Jan 15, 2020 | Jan 15, 2020 | | |
| Red Dead Redemption 2 | Action-adventure | Rockstar Games | Take-Two Interactive | Oct 26, 2018 | Oct 26, 2018 | Oct 26, 2018 | X | |
| Red Death | Shoot 'em up, retro | Panda Indie Studio | EastAsiaSoft | Mar 18, 2020 | Mar 18, 2020 | Mar 18, 2020 | | |
| Red Faction: Guerrilla Re-Mars-tered | Third-person shooter | Kaiko Games | THQ Nordic | Unreleased | Jul 3, 2018 | Jul 3, 2018 | | |
| Redeemer: Enhanced Edition | Brawler | Sobaka Studio | Ravenscourt | Unreleased | Jul 19, 2019 | Jul 19, 2019 | X | |
| Redout | Racing | 34BigThings | 34BigThings | Aug 29, 2017 | Aug 29, 2017 | Aug 29, 2017 | X | |
| Reed Remastered | Platformer | PXLink | Ratalaika Games | Feb 12, 2020 | Feb 12, 2020 | Feb 12, 2020 | | |
| Refunct | Platformer | Dominique Grieshofer | Dominique Grieshofer | Jun 6, 2017 | Jun 6, 2017 | Jun 6, 2017 | | |
| Regalia: Of Men and Monarchs - Royal Edition | Role-playing | Pixelated Milk | Crunching Koalas | Apr 13, 2018 | Apr 13, 2018 | Apr 13, 2018 | | |
| Regions of Ruin | Action role-playing, ARPG | Vox Games | JanduSoft | Jan 8, 2020 | Jan 8, 2020 | Jan 8, 2020 | | |
| Re:Legend | Role-playing | Magnus Games | 505 Games | Unreleased | TBA | TBA | | |
| Relicta | Puzzle | Mighty Polygon | Ravenscourt | Aug 4, 2020 | Aug 4, 2020 | Aug 4, 2020 | | |
| Rememoried | Platformer; puzzle | Vladimir Kudelka | Hangonit Studio | Unreleased | Dec 6, 2017 | Dec 6, 2017 | | |
| Remilore: Lost Girl in the Lands of Lore | Action role-playing | Pixellore; Remimory | Nicalis | Unreleased | Feb 26, 2019 | Feb 25, 2019 | | |
| Remnant: From the Ashes | Role-playing shooter | Gunfire Games | Perfect World Entertainment | Aug 20, 2019 | Aug 20, 2019 | Aug 20, 2019 | | |
| Remothered: Broken Porcelain | Survival horror | Stormind | Darril Arts | Unreleased | Oct 13, 2020 | Oct 13, 2020 | | |
| Remothered: Tormented Fathers | Survival horror | Stormind | Darril Arts | Unreleased | Jul 25, 2018 | Jul 25, 2018 | | |
| Rento Fortune | Board game; casual | Lan Games Eood | Lan Games Eood | Unreleased | Jun 1, 2018 | Jun 1, 2018 | | |
| Replay: VHS is not dead | Puzzle | Neko Entertainment | Neko Entertainment | Unreleased | Feb 24, 2016 | Feb 24, 2016 | | |
| Replica | Adventure | Somi | Playism | TBA | TBA | TBA | | |
| RESEARCH and DESTROY | Turn-based strategy | Implausible Industries | Spike Chunsoft | Apr 26, 2022 | Apr 25, 2022 | Apr 25, 2022 | | |
| Resident Evil HD Remaster | Survival horror | Capcom | Capcom | Jan 20, 2015 | Jan 20, 2015 | Jan 20, 2015 | | |
| Resident Evil 0 | Survival horror | Capcom | Capcom | Jan 21, 2016 | Jan 19, 2016 | Jan 19, 2016 | | |
| Resident Evil 2 | Survival horror | Capcom | Capcom | Jan 25, 2019 | Jan 25, 2019 | Jan 25, 2019 | X | |
| Resident Evil 3 | Survival horror | Capcom | Capcom | Apr 2, 2020 | Apr 3, 2020 | Apr 2, 2020 | | |
| Resident Evil 4 | Survival horror | Capcom | Capcom | Aug 29, 2016 | Aug 29, 2016 | Aug 29, 2016 | | |
| Resident Evil 5 | Survival horror | Capcom | Capcom | Jun 28, 2016 | Jun 28, 2016 | Jun 28, 2016 | | |
| Resident Evil 6 | Survival horror | Capcom | Capcom | Mar 29, 2016 | Mar 29, 2016 | Mar 29, 2016 | | |
| Resident Evil 7: Biohazard | Survival horror | Capcom | Capcom | Jan 26, 2017 | Jan 24, 2017 | Jan 24, 2017 | PA | |
| Resident Evil: Revelations | Survival horror | Capcom | Capcom | Aug 31, 2017 | Aug 29, 2017 | Aug 29, 2017 | | |
| Resident Evil: Revelations 2 | Survival horror | Capcom | Capcom | Mar 19, 2015 | Mar 17, 2015 | Mar 20, 2015 | | |
| Resident Evil Village | Survival horror | Capcom | Capcom | May 7, 2021 | May 7, 2021 | May 7, 2021 | | |
| Restless Hero | Action-adventure | Restless | Restless | Sep 6, 2019 | Sep 6, 2019 | Sep 6, 2019 | PA | |
| Restless Night | Top-down shooter | ChiliDog Interactive | ChiliDog Interactive | Jul 16, 2021 | Jul 16, 2021 | Jul 16, 2021 | | |
| Retro Machina | Real-time strategy | Orbit Studio | Super.com | Unreleased | May 12, 2021 | May 12, 2021 | | |
| RetroMania Wrestling | Sports | RetroMania Studios | RetroMania Studios | Unreleased | Feb 26, 2021 | Feb 26, 2021 | | |
| Return of the Obra Dinn | Puzzle adventure | Lucas Pope | 3909 | Oct 18, 2019 | Oct 18, 2019 | Oct 18, 2019 | | |
| Reus | Simulation | Abbey Games | Soedesco | Oct 10, 2016 | Oct 10, 2016 | Oct 10, 2016 | | |
| Revenant Dogma | Role-playing, JRPG | Exe Create | Kemco | Sep 12, 2018 | Sep 12, 2018 | Sep 12, 2018 | PA | |
| Revenant Saga | Role-playing, JRPG | Exe Create | Kemco | Apr 17, 2019 | Apr 17, 2019 | Apr 17, 2019 | | |
| Reverse Crawl | Roguelike tactical role-playing game | Nerdook Productions, Stage Clear Studios | Digerati | May 10, 2019 | May 10, 2019 | May 10, 2019 | | |
| Reversi Quest | Board game; role-playing | Yokogo Systems | Yokogo Systems | Unreleased | Jul 15, 2016 | Jul 15, 2016 | | |
| Revolve | Puzzle; platformer | Rusty Bolt | Rusty Bolt | Unreleased | Sep 22, 2017 | Sep 22, 2017 | | |
| Rex Rocket | Platformer | Castle Pixel | Castle Pixel | Sep 25, 2019 | Sep 25, 2019 | Sep 25, 2019 | PA | |
| RGX: Showdown | Racing | Shortround Games | Telltale Games | Unreleased | Sep 18, 2018 | Sep 18, 2018 | | |
| Rico | Shooter | Ground Shatter | Rising Star Games | Mar 13, 2019 | Mar 13, 2019 | Mar 13, 2019 | | |
| Ride | Racing | Milestone srl | Bandai Namco Entertainment | Jun 25, 2015 | Oct 6, 2015 | Apr 10, 2015 | | |
| Ride 2 | Racing | Milestone srl | Bandai Namco Entertainment | Unreleased | Feb 14, 2017 | Oct 6, 2016 | | |
| Ride 3 | Racing | Milestone srl | Bandai Namco Entertainment | Unreleased | Nov 30, 2018 | Nov 30, 2018 | | |
| Ride 4 | Racing | Milestone srl | Bandai Namco Entertainment | Unreleased | Oct 8, 2020 | Oct 8, 2020 | | |
| Riders Republic | Sports | Ubisoft Annecy | Ubisoft | Oct 28, 2021 | Oct 28, 2021 | Oct 28, 2021 | | |
| Rift Keeper | Action roguelite | Frymore | Sometimes You | Dec 10, 2019 | Dec 10, 2019 | Dec 10, 2019 | X | |
| RiftStar Raiders | Shooter | Climax Studios | Vision Games | Unreleased | Feb 28, 2018 | Feb 28, 2018 | | |
| Rime | Adventure | Tequila Works | Grey Box; Six Foot | Unreleased | May 26, 2017 | May 26, 2017 | | |
| RiMS Racing | Racing | RaceWard Studio | Nacon | Aug 19, 2021 | Aug 19, 2021 | Aug 19, 2021 | | |
| Riot: Civil Unrest | Real-time strategy; simulation | IVP Productions | Merge Games | Unreleased | Feb 6, 2019 | Feb 6, 2019 | | |
| Riptide GP: Renegade | Racing | Vector Unit | Vector Unit | Feb 24, 2017 | Feb 24, 2017 | Feb 24, 2017 | PA PC | |
| Riptide GP2 | Racing | Vector Unit | Vector Unit | Unreleased | Jan 23, 2015 | Jan 23, 2015 | | |
| Rise & Shine | Action-adventure | Super Awesome Hyper Dimensional Mega Team | Adult Swim Games | Unreleased | Jan 13, 2017 | Jan 13, 2017 | | |
| Rise of Insanity | Horror | Red Limb | Red Limb | Jun 15, 2018 | Jun 15, 2018 | Jun 15, 2018 | | |
| Rise of the Tomb Raider | Action-adventure | Crystal Dynamics | Square Enix | Nov 12, 2015 | Nov 10, 2015 | Nov 13, 2015 | X | |
| Risk | Card & Board, Family | Zoë Mode | Ubisoft | Unreleased | Feb 3, 2015 | Feb 3, 2015 | | |
| Risk of Rain | Shooter, roguelike | Hopoo Games | Gearbox Publishing | Aug 30, 2019 | Aug 30, 2019 | Aug 30, 2019 | | |
| Risk of Rain 2 | Shooter, roguelike | Hopoo Games | Code Mystics | Aug 30, 2019 | Aug 30, 2019 | Aug 30, 2019 | Vita | |
| Risk: Urban Assault | Card & Board, Family | Zoë Mode | Ubisoft | Unreleased | Aug 2, 2016 | Aug 2, 2016 | | |
| Ritual: Crown of Horns | Twin stick shooter | Draw Distance | Feardemic | Unreleased | Mar 13, 2020 | Mar 13, 2020 | | |
| Rival Megagun | Shoot 'em up | Spacewave Software | Degica | Nov 30, 2018 | Nov 30, 2018 | Nov 30, 2018 | | |
| Rivals of Aether | Fighting | Petra Jurošková | Dan Fornace | Unreleased | Aug 22, 2017 | Aug 22, 2017 | PA | |
| River City Girls | Beat 'em up | WayForward | Arc System Works; WayForward | Sep 5, 2019 | Sep 5, 2019 | Sep 5, 2019 | | |
| Riverbond | Action | Cococucumber | Cococucumber | Jun 9, 2019 | Jun 9, 2019 | Jun 9, 2019 | | |
| Road Rage | Racing, Action | Maximum Games | Maximum Games | Nov 14, 2017 | Oct 24, 2017 | Oct 24, 2017 | | |
| Road Redemption | Vehicular combat | DarkSeas Games | DarkSeas Games | Unreleased | Dec 19, 2018 | Dec 19, 2018 | | |
| Road to Ballhalla | Rhythm-based Action-Puzzler | Torched Hill | TinyBuild | Unreleased | Aug 1, 2018 | Aug 1, 2018 | | |
| Roarr! Jurassic Edition | Action, Family | Born Lucky Games | Klabater | Unreleased | Aug 9, 2019 | Aug 9, 2019 | | |
| Robocraft Infinity | Sandbox, Fighting | Freejam | Freejam | Apr 11, 2018 | Apr 11, 2018 | Apr 11, 2018 | PA X | |
| Roboquest | First-person shooter; roguelike | RyseUp Studios | RyseUp Studios | TBA | TBA | TBA | | |
| Rock 'N Racing Off Road DX | Racing | EnjoyUp Games | EnjoyUp Games | Unreleased | Oct 16, 2015 | Oct 16, 2015 | | |
| Rock Band 4 | Rhythm | Harmonix | Harmonix, Mad Catz | Unreleased | Oct 6, 2015 | Oct 6, 2015 | | |
| Rock of Ages 2: Bigger & Boulder | Tower Defense | Ace Team | Atlus | Unreleased | Aug 29, 2017 | Aug 29, 2017 | | |
| Rock Zombie | Action & Adventure | Quaternion Studio | EnjoyUp Games | Unreleased | Dec 4, 2015 | Dec 4, 2015 | | |
| Rocket League | Sports | Psyonix | Psyonix | Feb 17, 2016 | Feb 17, 2016 | Feb 17, 2016 | NS PC | |
| Rocket Wars | Multiplayer arena shoot 'em up | Archon Interactive | Rooftop Panda | Unreleased | May 9, 2018 | May 9, 2018 | | |
| Rocksmith 2014 | Music | Red Storm Entertainment | Ubisoft | Unreleased | Nov 4, 2014 | Nov 7, 2014 | | |
| Rogue Legacy | Roguelike action RPG | Cellar Door Games | Cellar Door Games | Unreleased | May 27, 2015 | May 27, 2015 | | |
| Rogue Stormers | Run and gun | Black Forest Games | Black Forest Games | Unreleased | Oct 6, 2016 | Oct 6, 2016 | | |
| Rogue Trooper Redux | Shooter | TickTock Games | Rebellion Developments | Oct 17, 2017 | Oct 17, 2017 | Oct 17, 2017 | | |
| Romance of the Three Kingdoms 13 | Turn-based strategy | Koei Tecmo | Koei Tecmo | Jan 28, 2016 | Apr 25, 2017 | Apr 25, 2017 | | |
| Romancing SaGa 2 | Role-playing | Square Enix | Square Enix | Dec 15, 2017 | Dec 15, 2017 | Dec 15, 2017 | PA | |
| Romancing SaGa 3 | Role-playing | Square Enix | Square Enix | Nov 11, 2019 | Nov 11, 2019 | Nov 11, 2019 | | |
| Rory McIlroy PGA Tour | Sports | EA Tiburon | EA Sports | Unreleased | Jul 14, 2015 | Jul 16, 2015 | | |
| Roundabout | Open world, racing | No Goblin | No Goblin | Feb 20, 2015 | Feb 20, 2015 | Feb 20, 2015 | | |
| Roundguard | Puzzle RPG | Wonderbelly Games | The Quantum Astrophysicists Guild | Mar 13, 2020 | Mar 13, 2020 | Mar 13, 2020 | X | |
| Royal Assault | Casual strategy, tower defense | Bionic Pony | Bionic Pony | Dec 21, 2018 | Dec 21, 2018 | Dec 21, 2018 | | |
| Royal Roads | Casual strategy, time management | 8floor | 8floor | Unreleased | Apr 5, 2019 | Apr 5, 2019 | | |
| RPGolf Legends | Role-playing; sports | ArcticNet | Kemco | Jan 20, 2022 | 2022 | 2022 | | |
| R-Type Final 2 | Shoot 'em up | Granzella | JP: Granzella; WW: NIS America | Apr 29, 2021 | Apr 30, 2021 | Apr 30, 2021 | | |
| Rubber Bandits | Party | Flashbulb Games | Flashbulb Games | Dec 2, 2021 | Dec 2, 2021 | Dec 2, 2021 | | |
| Rugby 15 | Sports | HB Studios | Bigben Interactive | Unreleased | Feb 24, 2015 | Jan 23, 2015 | | |
| Rugby 18 | Sports | EKO Software | Bigben Interactive | Oct 31, 2017 | Oct 31, 2017 | Oct 31, 2017 | X | |
| Rugby Challenge 3 | Sports | Wicked Witch Software | Home Entertainment Suppliers Pty | Unreleased | Apr 22, 2016 | Apr 22, 2016 | | |
| Rugby League Live 3 | Sports | Big Ant Studios | Home Entertainment Suppliers Pty | Unreleased | Sep 10, 2015 | Sep 10, 2015 | | |
| Rugby League Live 4 | Sports | Big Ant Studios | Home Entertainment Suppliers Pty | Jul 28, 2017 | Jul 28, 2017 | Jul 28, 2017 | | |
| Rugby World Cup 15 | Sports | HB Studios | Bigben Interactive | Unreleased | Sep 4, 2015 | Sep 4, 2015 | | |
| Ruined King: A League of Legends Story | Role-playing | Airship Syndicate | Riot Forge | Nov 16, 2021 | Nov 16, 2021 | Nov 16, 2021 | | |
| Ruiner | Shooter | Reikon Games | Devolver Digital | Sep 26, 2017 | Sep 26, 2017 | Sep 26, 2017 | PA | |
| Ruinverse | Role-playing | Kemco | Kemco | Dec 4, 2020 | Dec 4, 2020 | Dec 4, 2020 | | |
| Rumbleverse | Battle Royale | Iron Galaxy | Epic Games Publishing | Aug 11, 2022 | Aug 11, 2022 | Aug 11, 2022 | | |
| Runbow | Platformer | 13AM Games | 13AM Games | Jul 15, 2017 | Jul 15, 2017 | Jul 15, 2017 | | |
| Rune Lord | Puzzle | Alawar, Adept Studios | Victory Road | Unreleased | Feb 7, 2020 | Feb 7, 2020 | | |
| RunestoneKeeper | Role-playing, turn-based | Blackfire Games | E-Home Entertainment | Apr 25, 2018 | Apr 25, 2018 | Apr 25, 2018 | PA | |
| Rush Rover | Top-down shooter, roguelike | Radio | Ratalaika Games | Apr 8, 2020 | Apr 8, 2020 | Apr 8, 2020 | | |
| RWBY: Grimm Eclipse | Hack n' slash | Rooster Teeth Games | Rooster Teeth Games | Unreleased | Jan 17, 2017 | Jan 17, 2017 | | |
| Ryse: Son of Rome | Action-Adventure | Crytek | Xbox Game Studios | Sep 4, 2014 | Nov 22, 2013 | Nov 22, 2013 | K | |
| Sagebrush | Adventure | Redact Games | Ratalaika Games | Aug 7, 2019 | Aug 7, 2019 | Aug 7, 2019 | | |
| Saints Row: Gat out of Hell | action-adventure | Voliton | Deep Silver | Apr 16, 2015 | Jan 20, 2015 | Jan 23, 2015 | | |
| Saints Row IV: Re-Elected | action-adventure | Voliton | Deep Silver | Apr 16, 2015 | Jan 20, 2015 | Jan 23, 2015 | | |
| Sally's Law | Platformer | Nanali | Polaris-x Studios | Sep 25, 2019 | Sep 25, 2019 | Sep 25, 2019 | | |
| Salt and Sanctuary | Side Scrolling Action-RPG | Ska Studios | Ska Studios | Unreleased | Feb 6, 2019 | Feb 6, 2019 | | |
| Sam & Max Beyond Time and Space Remastered | Adventure | Skunkape Games | Skunkape Games | Unreleased | Dec 8, 2021 | Dec 8, 2021 | | |
| Sam & Max Save the World Remastered | Adventure | Skunkape Games | Skunkape Games | Unreleased | Aug 10, 2021 | Aug 10, 2021 | | |
| Sam & Max: The Devil's Playhouse Remastered | Adventure | Skunkape Games | Skunkape Games | Unreleased | Aug 14, 2024 | Aug 14, 2024 | | |
| Samsara | Puzzle | Marker | Marker | Feb 7, 2018 | Feb 7, 2018 | Feb 7, 2018 | PA | |
| Samurai Jack: Battle Through Time | Action; fighting | Soleil Ltd. | Adult Swim Games | Unreleased | Aug 21, 2020 | Aug 21, 2020 | | |
| Samurai Shodown | Fighting | SNK | SNK | Jun 27, 2019 | Jun 25, 2019 | Jun 25, 2019 | | |
| Samurai Warriors 5 | Hack and slash | Omega Force | Koei Tecmo Games | Jun 24, 2021 | Jul 27, 2021 | Jul 27, 2021 | | |
| Saturday Morning RPG | Role-playing | Mighty Rabbit Studios | Mighty Rabbit Studios | Oct 25, 2016 | Oct 25, 2016 | Oct 25, 2016 | | |
| Save the Ninja Clan | Platformer | Sometimes You | Sometimes You | May 5, 2017 | May 5, 2017 | May 5, 2017 | | |
| Save Your Nuts | Party game | Triple Scale Games | Triple Scale Games | Apr 16, 2020 | Apr 16, 2020 | Apr 16, 2020 | | |
| Sayonara Wild Hearts | Music, racing | Simogo | Annapurna Interactive | Apr 30, 2020 | Feb 25, 2020 | Feb 25, 2020 | | |
| Scarlett Mysteries: Cursed Child | Hidden object adventure | World Loom | Artifex Mundi | Nov 14, 2019 | Nov 15, 2019 | Nov 14, 2019 | X | |
| Scarlet Nexus | Action role-playing | Bandai Namco | Bandai Namco | Jun 25, 2021 | Jun 25, 2021 | Jun 25, 2021 | | |
| Scheming Through the Zombie Apocalypse: The Beginning | Adventure | Entertainment Forge | Ratalaika Games | Sep 18, 2019 | Sep 18, 2019 | Sep 18, 2019 | | |
| Schim | Platform | Ewoud van der Werf; Nils Slijkerman | WW: Extra Nice; JP: Playism | Jul 18, 2024 | Jul 18, 2024 | Jul 18, 2024 | | |
| Schrödinger's Cat and The Raiders of The Lost Quark | Action-adventure | Team17 | Team17 | Unreleased | May 13, 2015 | May 13, 2015 | | |
| Score Rush Extended | Shooter | Xona Games | Xona Games | Unreleased | TBA | TBA | | |
| Scott Pilgrim vs. the World: The Game - Complete Edition | Beat 'em up | Ubisoft Chengdu | Ubisoft | Jan 14, 2021 | Jan 14, 2021 | Jan 14, 2021 | | |
| ScourgeBringer | Rougelike | Flying Oak Games | Dear Villagers | Unreleased | Oct 21, 2020 | Oct 21, 2020 | | |
| Scrabble | Card & Board | Ubisoft Chengdu | Ubisoft | Unreleased | Jun 30, 2015 | Unreleased | | |
| Screamride | Puzzle | Frontier Developments | Xbox Game Studios | Mar 5, 2015 | Mar 3, 2015 | Mar 6, 2015 | | |
| Screencheat | First-person shooter | Surprise Attack Games | Surprise Attack Games | Mar 1, 2016 | Mar 1, 2016 | Mar 1, 2016 | | |
| Scribblenauts Mega Pack | Puzzle | Shiver Entertainment | Warner Bros. Interactive Entertainment | Unreleased | Sep 18, 2018 | Sep 18, 2018 | | |
| Scribblenauts Showdown | Party, Puzzle | Shiver Entertainment | Warner Bros. Interactive Entertainment | Unreleased | Mar 6, 2018 | Mar 6, 2018 | | |
| Sea of Solitude | Adventure | Jo-Mei Games | Electronic Arts | Unreleased | Jul 5, 2019 | Jul 5, 2019 | | |
| Sea of Thieves | Action-adventure | Rare | Xbox Game Studios | Mar 19, 2018 | Mar 20, 2018 | Mar 20, 2018 | PA PC | |
| Sea Salt | Action-strategy | YCJY Games | YCJY Games | Unreleased | Oct 17, 2019 | Oct 17, 2019 | | |
| Seasons After Fall | Platform, puzzle | Swing Swing Submarine | Focus Home Interactive | May 16, 2017 | May 16, 2017 | May 16, 2017 | | |
| Sébastien Loeb Rally Evo | Racing | Milestone srl | Milestone srl | Mar 17, 2016 | Jan 29, 2016 | Jan 29, 2016 | | |
| Secret Neighbor | Asymmetric Multiplayer | Hologryph | TinyBuild | Oct 23, 2019 | Oct 23, 2019 | Oct 23, 2019 | | |
| The Secret Order: Shadow Breach | Hidden object adventure | Sunward Games | Artifex Mundi | Mar 19, 2020 | Mar 20, 2020 | Mar 19, 2020 | X | |
| Seek Hearts | Role-playing, JRPG | Exe Create | Kemco | Dec 4, 2019 | Dec 4, 2019 | Dec 4, 2019 | PA | |
| Sega Genesis Classics | Multiple | Sega | Sega | Unreleased | May 29, 2018 | May 29, 2018 | | |
| Sekiro: Shadows Die Twice | Action-adventure | FromSoftware | Activision | Mar 22, 2019 | Mar 22, 2019 | Mar 22, 2019 | X | |
| Sephirothic Stories | Role-playing, Retro, JRPG | Exe Create | Kemco | Mar 15, 2019 | Mar 15, 2019 | Mar 15, 2019 | PA | |
| Sephonie | Puzzle-platform | Analgesic Productions | Ratalaika Games | Jul 21, 2023 | Jul 21, 2023 | Jul 21, 2023 | | |
| Serial Cleaner | Action, Stealth | iFun4All | Curve Digital | Unreleased | Jul 13, 2017 | Jul 13, 2017 | | |
| Serious Sam Collection | First-person shooter | Croteam | Devolver Digital | Unreleased | Nov 17, 2020 | Nov 17, 2020 | | |
| Session | Skateboarding | Creature Studios | Creature Studios | Unreleased | Jun 17, 2020 | Jun 17, 2020 | | |
| Seum: Speedrunners from Hell | Platformer | Pine Studio | Headup Games | Sep 22, 2017 | Sep 22, 2017 | Sep 22, 2017 | | |
| The Sexy Brutale | Adventure; puzzle | Cavalier Game Studios; Tequila Works | Tequila Works | Apr 12, 2017 | Apr 12, 2017 | Apr 12, 2017 | | |
| Shadow Complex Remastered | Shooter | Chair Entertainment; Hardsuit Labs | Epic Games | Mar 16, 2016 | Mar 16, 2016 | Mar 16, 2016 | | |
| Shadow Fencer Theater | Fighting, Physics | Shuddahaddalottafun | Shuddahaddalottafun | Jun 26, 2019 | Jun 26, 2019 | Jun 26, 2019 | X | |
| Shadow Man Remastered | Action-adventure | Nightdive Studios | Nightdive Studios | Unreleased | Jan 17, 2022 | Jan 17, 2022 | | |
| Shadow of Loot Box | Parody shooter | Stately Snail | Ratalaika Games | Nov 2, 2018 | Nov 2, 2018 | Nov 2, 2018 | | |
| Shadow of the Tomb Raider | Action-adventure | Eidos Montreal | Square Enix | Sep 14, 2018 | Sep 14, 2018 | Sep 14, 2018 | X | |
| Shadow Tactics: Blades of the Shogun | Real-time tactics; stealth | Mimimi Productions | Daedalic Entertainment | Jul 28, 2017 | Aug 1, 2017 | Jul 28, 2017 | | |
| Shadow Warrior | First-person shooter | Flying Wild Hog | Devolver Digital | Unreleased | Oct 21, 2014 | Oct 24, 2014 | | |
| Shadow Warrior 2 | First-person shooter | Flying Wild Hog | Devolver Digital | May 19, 2017 | May 19, 2017 | May 19, 2017 | | |
| Shadow Warrior 3 | First-person shooter | Flying Wild Hog | Devolver Digital | Unreleased | Mar 1, 2022 | Mar 1, 2022 | | |
| Shadowgate | Adventure | Abstraction Games | Abstraction Games | Apr 10, 2019 | Apr 11, 2019 | Apr 10, 2019 | | |
| Shadows: Awakening | Action role-playing | Games Farm | Kalypso Media | Sep 4, 2018 | Sep 4, 2018 | Sep 4, 2018 | | |
| Shadows of the Damned: Hella Remastered | Action-adventure | Grasshopper Manufacture | NetEase Entertainment Interactive | Oct 31, 2024 | Oct 31, 2024 | Oct 31, 2024 | | |
| Shalnor Legends: Sacred Lands | Role-playing | Johnny Ostad | Johnny Ostad | Sep 7, 2018 | Sep 7, 2018 | Sep 7, 2018 | | |
| Shantae Advance: Risky Revolution | Platform; Metroidvania | WayForward Technologies | WayForward Technologies | Aug 19, 2025 | Aug 19, 2025 | Aug 19, 2025 | | |
| Shantae: Half-Genie Hero | Platform; adventure | WayForward Technologies | WayForward Technologies | Dec 20, 2016 | Dec 20, 2016 | Dec 20, 2016 | | |
| Shantae and the Pirate's Curse | Platform; Metroidvania | WayForward Technologies | WayForward Technologies | Mar 16, 2016 | Mar 16, 2016 | Mar 16, 2016 | | |
| Shantae: Risky's Revenge - Director's Cut | Platform; Metroidvania | WayForward Technologies | WayForward Technologies | Oct 15, 2020 | Oct 15, 2020 | Oct 15, 2020 | | |
| Shantae and the Seven Sirens | Platform; Metroidvania | WayForward Technologies | WayForward Technologies | May 28, 2020 | May 28, 2020 | May 28, 2020 | | |
| Shape of the World | Adventure | Stu Maxwell | Plug In Digital | Jun 6, 2018 | Jun 6, 2018 | Jun 6, 2018 | | |
| Shape Up | Sports; fitness; motion controlled | Ubisoft Montreal | Ubisoft | Unreleased | Nov 11, 2014 | Nov 14, 2014 | K | |
| The Shapeshifting Detective | FMV Adventure | D'Avekki Studios | Wales Interactive | Nov 6, 2018 | Nov 6, 2018 | Nov 6, 2018 | | |
| Shaq Fu: A Legend Reborn | Action-adventure; beat 'em up | Saber Interactive | Wire Productions | Jun 5, 2018 | Jun 5, 2018 | Jun 5, 2018 | | |
| She Dreams Elsewhere | Adventure; role-playing | Studio Zevere | Studio Zevere | Unreleased | TBA | TBA | | |
| Shellshock Live | Artillery | KChamp | KChamp | Mar 8, 2019 | Mar 8, 2019 | Mar 8, 2019 | X | |
| Sheltered | Strategy | Unicube | Team17 | Unreleased | Mar 15, 2016 | Mar 15, 2016 | | |
| Shenmue I & II | Action-adventure; role-playing | D3T | Sega | Aug 21, 2018 | Aug 21, 2018 | Aug 21, 2018 | | |
| Sherlock Holmes: The Awakened | Adventure | Frogwares | Frogwares | Apr 11, 2023 | Apr 11, 2023 | Apr 11, 2023 | | |
| Sherlock Holmes: Crimes & Punishments | Adventure | Frogwares | Focus Home Interactive | Unreleased | Sep 30, 2014 | Oct 3, 2014 | | |
| Sherlock Holmes: The Devil's Daughter | Adventure | Frogwares | Bigben Interactive | Oct 25, 2016 | Oct 25, 2016 | Oct 25, 2016 | | |
| Shift Happens | Platform | Klonk Games | Deck13 | Unreleased | Feb 22, 2017 | Feb 22, 2017 | | |
| Shiftlings | Platform | Rock Pocket Games | Rock Pocket Games | Unreleased | Mar 4, 2015 | Mar 4, 2015 | | |
| Shikhondo: Soul Eater | Shoot 'em up | Nephilim Game Studios; Deer Farm | Digerati | Unreleased | Aug 28, 2018 | Aug 28, 2018 | | |
| Shiness: The Lightning Kingdom | Role-playing | Enigami | Focus Home Interactive | Apr 18, 2017 | Apr 18, 2017 | Apr 18, 2017 | | |
| Shining Resonance Refrain | Role-playing | Media.Vision | Sega | Jul 10, 2018 | Jul 10, 2018 | Jul 10, 2018 | X | |
| Shin Megami Tensei V: Vengeance | Role-playing | Atlus | Sega | Jun 14, 2024 | Jun 14, 2024 | Jun 14, 2024 | | |
| Shiny | Action | Garage 227 Studios | Garage 227 Studios | Oct 11, 2017 | Oct 11, 2017 | Oct 11, 2017 | | |
| Shovel Knight | Action & adventure, platformer | Yacht Club Games | Yacht Club Games | Apr 29, 2015 | Apr 29, 2015 | Apr 29, 2015 | | |
| Shred It! | Sports | Extra Mile Studios | Extra Mile Studios | Mar 18, 2016 | Mar 18, 2016 | Mar 18, 2016 | | |
| Shoppe Keep | Strategy; action | Strange Fire | Excalibur Games | Unreleased | Mar 2, 2018 | Mar 2, 2018 | | |
| Siegecraft Commander | Strategy | Blowfish Studios | Blowfish Studios | Jan 17, 2017 | Jan 17, 2017 | Jan 17, 2017 | | |
| Sigi: A Fart for Melusina | Side scrolling action | Pixel.lu | Pixel.lu | Sep 7, 2018 | Sep 7, 2018 | Sep 7, 2018 | X | |
| Silence: The Whispered World 2 | Point & click adventure | Daedalic Entertainment | Daedalic Entertainment | Dec 9, 2016 | Dec 9, 2016 | Dec 9, 2016 | PA | |
| The Sims 4 | Life simulation | Maxis | Electronic Arts | Nov 17, 2017 | Nov 17, 2017 | Nov 17, 2017 | | |
| Simulacra | FMV Adventure | Kaigan Games | Wales Interactive | Dec 3, 2019 | Dec 3, 2019 | Dec 3, 2019 | | |
| Sine Mora EX | Shoot 'em up | Digital Reality | THQ Nordic | Aug 8, 2017 | Aug 8, 2017 | Aug 8, 2017 | | |
| The Sinking City | Adventure, horror | Frogwares | Bigben Interactive | Jun 27, 2019 | Jun 27, 2019 | Jun 27, 2019 | | |
| Sinkr | Puzzle | Wahler Digital | Wahler Digital | Apr 16, 2020 | Apr 17, 2020 | Apr 16, 2020 | PA | |
| Sinner: Sacrifice for Redemption | Action role-playing | Dark Star Game Studios | Another Indie | Unreleased | Oct 18, 2018 | Oct 18, 2018 | | |
| Sisters Royale: Five Sisters Under Fire | Shoot 'em up | Alfa System | Chorus Worldwide | Jul 10, 2020 | Jul 10, 2020 | Jul 10, 2020 | | |
| Sixty Second Shooter Prime | Shooter | Happion Labs | Happion Labs | Unreleased | Jun 18, 2014 | Jun 18, 2014 | | |
| Skate City | Sports | Agens | Snowman | Unreleased | May 6, 2021 | May 6, 2021 | | |
| Skater XL | Sports; simulation | Easy Day Studios | Easy Day Studios | Unreleased | Jul 28, 2020 | Jul 28, 2020 | | |
| Skatebird | Sports | Glass Bottom Games | Glass Bottom Games | Sep 16, 2021 | Sep 16, 2021 | Sep 16, 2021 | | |
| Skelly Selest | Roguelite arena shooter | Anthony Case, Stage Clear Studios | Digerati | May 24, 2019 | May 24, 2019 | May 24, 2019 | | |
| Skul: The Hero Slayer | Platform | SouthPAW Games | Neowiz | Unreleased | Oct 21, 2021 | Oct 21, 2021 | | |
| Skull and Bones | Action & adventure | Ubisoft Singapore | Ubisoft | Unreleased | Nov 8, 2022 | Nov 8, 2022 | | |
| Sky Force Anniversary | Shoot 'em up | Infinite Dreams | Infinite Dreams | Dec 8, 2016 | Dec 8, 2016 | Dec 8, 2016 | | |
| Sky Force Reloaded | Shoot 'em up | Infinite Dreams | Infinite Dreams | Dec 1, 2017 | Dec 1, 2017 | Dec 1, 2017 | | |
| Sky Rogue | Arcade flight sim, roguelite | Fractal Phase | Fractal Phase | Jan 31, 2020 | Jan 31, 2020 | Jan 31, 2020 | PA | |
| SkyKeepers | Action, platformer | Sword Twin Studios | Sword Twin Studios | Unreleased | Mar 31, 2017 | Mar 31, 2017 | | |
| Skylanders: Imaginators | Platform | Toys For Bob | Activision | Unreleased | Oct 16, 2016 | Oct 14, 2016 | | |
| Skylanders: Swap Force | Platform | Vicarious Visions | Activision | Unreleased | Nov 22, 2013 | Nov 22, 2013 | | |
| Skylanders: SuperChargers | Platform | Vicarious Visions | Activision | Unreleased | Sep 20, 2015 | Sep 25, 2015 | | |
| Skylanders: Trap Team | Platform | Beenox | Activision | Unreleased | Oct 5, 2014 | Oct 10, 2014 | | |
| Skylar & Plux: Adventure on Clover Island | Action-adventure | Right Nice Games | Grip Digital | May 19, 2017 | May 19, 2017 | May 19, 2017 | | |
| Skyling: Garden Defense | Action & Adventure | Mighty Studios | Mighty Studios | Unreleased | Apr 19, 2016 | Apr 19, 2016 | | |
| Slabwell | Puzzle | Undercoders | JanduSoft | Oct 4, 2019 | Oct 4, 2019 | Oct 4, 2019 | | |
| Slain: Back from Hell | Side-scrolling action | 22nd Century Toys | Digerati | Oct 20, 2016 | Oct 20, 2016 | Oct 20, 2016 | | |
| SlashDash | 8-bit arena fighter | Nevernaut Games | Nevernaut Games | Jul 17, 2015 | Jul 17, 2015 | Jul 17, 2015 | | |
| Slay the Spire | Role-playing, Roguelike, Collectible card game | MegaCrit | Humble Bundle | Aug 14, 2019 | Aug 14, 2019 | Aug 14, 2019 | | |
| Slayaway Camp: The Butcher's Cut | Puzzle | Blue Wizard Digital; Stage Clear Studios | Digerati | Oct 23, 2017 | Oct 23, 2017 | Oct 23, 2017 | | |
| Sleepin' Deeply | Puzzle | Chubby Pixel | Chubby Pixel | Dec 4, 2020 | Dec 4, 2020 | Dec 4, 2020 | | |
| Sleeping Dogs: Definitive Edition | Action-adventure | United Front Games | Square Enix | Unreleased | Oct 14, 2014 | Oct 10, 2014 | | |
| Slender: The Arrival | Action & Adventure | Blue Isle Studios | Blue Isle Studios | Mar 25, 2015 | Mar 25, 2015 | Mar 25, 2015 | | |
| Slice Zombies for Kinect | Motion controlled | Made | Made | Unreleased | May 8, 2015 | May 8, 2015 | K | |
| Slime Rancher | Action-adventure | Monomi Park | Monomi Park | Aug 1, 2017 | Aug 1, 2017 | Aug 1, 2017 | X | |
| Slime-san Superslime Edition | Platformer | Fabraz | Headup Games | Jun 22, 2018 | Jun 22, 2018 | Jun 22, 2018 | | |
| Smelter | Action; strategy | X Plus | Dangen Entertainment | Apr 22, 2021 | Apr 22, 2021 | Apr 22, 2021 | | |
| Smoke and Sacrifice | Action role-playing; survival | Solar Sail Games | Curve Digital | Unreleased | Jan 15, 2019 | Jan 15, 2019 | X | |
| Smoots Summer Games | Sports | JanduSoft | Kaneda Games | Aug 21, 2019 | Aug 21, 2019 | Aug 21, 2019 | | |
| Smoots World Cup Tennis | Sports | Kaneda Games | Kaneda Games | Apr 5, 2019 | Apr 5, 2019 | Apr 5, 2019 | | |
| The Smurfs: Mission Vileaf | Action-adventure | OSome Studios | Microids | Nov 5, 2021 | Nov 16, 2021 | Nov 5, 2021 | | |
| Snake Pass | Puzzle platformer | Sumo Digital | Sumo Digital | Mar 29, 2017 | Mar 29, 2017 | Mar 29, 2017 | PA | |
| Snakeybus | Arcade | Stovetop, Stage Clear Studios | Digerati | Apr 3, 2020 | Apr 3, 2020 | Apr 3, 2020 | | |
| Sniper Elite 3 | Tactical shooter; stealth | Rebellion Developments | 505 Games | Unreleased | Jul 1, 2014 | Jun 27, 2014 | | |
| Sniper Elite 4 | Tactical shooter; stealth | Rebellion Developments | Rebellion Developments | Feb 14, 2017 | Feb 14, 2017 | Feb 14, 2017 | FPSB | |
| Sniper Elite V2 Remastered | Tactical shooter; stealth | Rebellion Developments | Rebellion Developments | May 14, 2019 | May 14, 2019 | May 14, 2019 | PA X | |
| Sniper Ghost Warrior 3 | Tactical shooter; stealth | CI Games | CI Games | Apr 25, 2017 | Apr 25, 2017 | Apr 25, 2017 | | |
| Sniper Ghost Warrior Contracts | Tactical shooter; stealth | CI Games | CI Games | Nov 21, 2019 | Nov 22, 2019 | Nov 22, 2019 | | |
| Sniper Ghost Warrior Contracts 2 | Tactical shooter; stealth | CI Games | CI Games | Jun 4, 2021 | Jun 4, 2021 | Jun 4, 2021 | | |
| SNK 40th Anniversary Collection | Retro collection | Digital Eclipse | Other Ocean | May 3, 2019 | May 3, 2019 | May 3, 2019 | X | |
| Snooker 19 | Sports | Lab42 | Ripstone | Apr 16, 2019 | Apr 17, 2019 | Apr 16, 2019 | X | |
| Snooker Nation Championship | Sports | Cherry Pop Games | Cherry Pop Games | May 28, 2019 | May 28, 2019 | May 28, 2019 | | |
| SnowRunner | Simulation | Saber Interactive | Focus Home Interactive | Apr 28, 2020 | Apr 28, 2020 | Apr 28, 2020 | | |
| So Many Me | Puzzle, Platforming | Extend Interactive | Origo Games | Jul 16, 2015 | Jul 16, 2015 | Jul 16, 2015 | | |
| Soccer Power Hero | Sports | Diyaa Games | Diyaa Games | Dec 25, 2019 | Dec 25, 2019 | Dec 25, 2019 | PC X | |
| Socketeer | Roguelite ARPG | Ice Beam | Alliance Digital Media | Unreleased | Aug 20, 2018 | Aug 20, 2018 | | |
| Soda Drinker Pro | Simulator | Snowrunner | Snowrunner | Apr 14, 2016 | Apr 14, 2016 | Apr 14, 2016 | | |
| The Sojourn | First-person puzzle adventure | Shifting Tides | Iceberg Interactive | Sep 20, 2019 | Sep 20, 2019 | Sep 20, 2019 | X | |
| Solar Shifter EX | Action & Adventure, Shooter | Elder Games | Headup Games | Unreleased | Aug 25, 2016 | Aug 25, 2016 | | |
| Sole | Adventure | Gossamer Games | Gossamer Games | Unreleased | Sep 28, 2019 | Sep 28, 2019 | | |
| Solitaire | Card Game | Sanuk Games | Bigben Interactive | Unreleased | Oct 10, 2016 | Oct 10, 2016 | | |
| SolSeraph | Action/strategy | Ace Team | Sega | Unreleased | Jul 10, 2019 | Jul 10, 2019 | | |
| Soma | Survival horror | Frictional Games | Frictional Games | Unreleased | Dec 1, 2017 | Dec 1, 2017 | | |
| Song of Horror | Survival horror | Raiser Games | Raiser Games | Unreleased | May 28, 2021 | May 28, 2021 | | |
| Song of the Deep | Adventure | Insomniac Games | Insomniac Games; GameTrust Games | Jul 12, 2016 | Jul 12, 2016 | Jul 12, 2016 | | |
| Songbringer | Action role-playing | Wizard Fu | Double Eleven | Sep 1, 2017 | Sep 1, 2017 | Sep 1, 2017 | PA | |
| Sonic Colors: Ultimate | Platformer | Blind Squirrel Games | Sega | Sep 9, 2021 | Sep 7, 2021 | Sep 7, 2021 | | |
| Sonic Forces | Platformer | Sonic Team | Sega | Nov 9, 2017 | Nov 7, 2017 | Nov 7, 2017 | X | |
| Sonic Mania | Platformer | PagodaWest Games / Headcannon | Sega | Aug 16, 2017 | Aug 15, 2017 | Aug 15, 2017 | | |
| Sonic Mania Plus | Platformer | Christian Whitehead; Headcannon; PagondaWest Games; Hyperkinetic Studios | Sega | Jul 19, 2018 | Jul 17, 2018 | Jul 17, 2018 | | |
| Soulcalibur VI | Fighting | Project Soul | Namco Bandai Games | Oct 19, 2018 | Oct 19, 2018 | Oct 19, 2018 | X | |
| Soul Hackers 2 | Role-playing | Atlus | Atlus | Aug 25, 2022 | Aug 26, 2022 | Aug 26, 2022 | | |
| Solo: Islands of the Heart | Puzzle | Team Gotham | Merge Games | Jul 31, 2019 | Jul 31, 2019 | Jul 31, 2019 | | |
| The Solus Project | Survival, Adventure | Teotl Studios | Grip Games | Jul 15, 2016 | Jul 15, 2016 | Jul 15, 2016 | | |
| Soul Axiom | Adventure, Puzzle | Wales Interactive | Wales Interactive | Jun 7, 2016 | Jun 7, 2016 | Jun 7, 2016 | | |
| South Park: The Fractured but Whole | Role-playing | Ubisoft San Francisco | Ubisoft | Oct 17, 2017 | Oct 17, 2017 | Oct 17, 2017 | | |
| South Park: The Stick of Truth | Role-playing | Obsidian Entertainment | Ubisoft | Oct 17, 2017 | Oct 17, 2017 | Oct 17, 2017 | | |
| Space Engineers | Sandbox, Simulation | Keen Software House | Keen Software House | Apr 15, 2020 | Apr 15, 2020 | Apr 15, 2020 | | |
| Space Hulk: Ascension | Turn-based strategy | Hoplite Research | Hoplite Research | Unreleased | Apr 20, 2018 | Apr 20, 2018 | | |
| Space Hulk: Tactics | Turn-based strategy | Cyanide | Focus Home Interactive | Unreleased | Oct 9, 2018 | Oct 9, 2018 | X | |
| Spaceland | Strategy, TBS | Tortuga Team | Ellada Games | Feb 14, 2020 | Feb 14, 2020 | Feb 14, 2020 | X | |
| Spacelines from the Far Out | Roguelike, Party | Coffeenauts | Skystone Games | Jun 7, 2022 | Jun 7, 2022 | Jun 7, 2022 | | |
| Spareware | Shooter | Rusto | Rusto | Unreleased | Mar 18, 2016 | Mar 18, 2016 | | |
| Spark the Electric Jester 2 | Platform | Feperd Games | Feperd Games | Sep 7, 2020 | Sep 7, 2020 | Sep 7, 2020 | | |
| Sparkle 2 | Puzzle | 10tons | 10tons | Unreleased | Jan 27, 2016 | Jan 27, 2016 | | |
| Sparkle Unleashed | Puzzle | 10tons | 10tons | Unreleased | Jun 3, 2015 | Jun 3, 2015 | | |
| Sparklite | Action-adventure, Roguelite | Red Blue Games | Merge Games | Nov 14, 2019 | Nov 14, 2019 | Nov 14, 2019 | | |
| Spartan | Platformer | Sinister Cyclops Game Studios | Sinister Cyclops Game Studios | Aug 23, 2017 | Aug 23, 2017 | Aug 23, 2017 | | |
| Spartan Fist | Action, roguelite | Glass Bottom Games | JanduSoft | Feb 28, 2020 | Feb 28, 2020 | Feb 28, 2020 | | |
| Spectra | Racing | Gateway Interactive | Gateway Interactive | Unreleased | May 8, 2015 | May 8, 2015 | | |
| Spectrum | Action & Adventure | 3D Avenue | Digerati | Unreleased | Aug 24, 2018 | Aug 24, 2018 | | |
| The Spectrum Retreat | First-person adventure | Dan Smith Studios | Ripstone | Unreleased | Jul 13, 2018 | Jul 13, 2018 | X | |
| Speed Brawl | Platform-brawler, Party | Double Stallion Games | Kongregate | Unreleased | Sep 18, 2018 | Sep 18, 2018 | X | |
| Speed Limit | Shoot 'em up | Gamechuck | Chorus Worldwide | Unreleased | Feb 19, 2021 | Feb 19, 2021 | | |
| Speedboat Challenge | Racing | WS Net | WS Net | Oct 4, 2016 | Oct 4, 2016 | Oct 4, 2016 | | |
| SpeedRunners | Platform | DoubleDutch Games | TinyBuild | Jun 1, 2017 | Jun 1, 2017 | Jun 1, 2017 | | |
| SpellForce 3 Reforced | Real-time strategy; role-playing | Grimlore Games | THQ Nordic | Dec 7, 2021 | Dec 7, 2021 | Dec 7, 2021 | | |
| Spellspire | Puzzle, Role-playing | 10tons | 10tons | Unreleased | May 26, 2017 | May 26, 2017 | | |
| Spelunky 2 | Platform | Mossmouth, Blitworks | Mossmouth | Jan 13, 2022 | Jan 13, 2022 | Jan 13, 2022 | | |
| Spencer | Platform | EntwicklerX | EntwicklerX | Oct 11, 2018 | Oct 11, 2018 | Oct 11, 2018 | | |
| Spheroids | Action, Platform | Eclipse Games | Eclipse Games | Unreleased | Feb 10, 2017 | Feb 10, 2017 | PA | |
| Spike Volleyball | Sports | Black Sheep | Bigben Interactive | Unreleased | Feb 5, 2019 | Feb 5, 2019 | X | |
| Spintires: MudRunner | Vehicle simulation | Saber Interactive | Focus Home Interactive | Oct 31, 2017 | Oct 31, 2017 | Oct 31, 2017 | | |
| Spiral Splatter | Puzzle | Neonchimp Games | Sometimes You | Mar 13, 2018 | Mar 13, 2018 | Mar 13, 2018 | | |
| Splash Blast Panic | Party Brawler | Team Kwakwa | Digital Smash | Unreleased | Aug 28, 2018 | Aug 28, 2018 | PA | |
| Splasher | Platformer | Splashteam | Plug In Digital | Sep 26, 2017 | Sep 26, 2017 | Sep 26, 2017 | | |
| Splitgate | First-Person Shooter | 1047 Games | 1047 Games | Jul 27, 2021 | Jul 27, 2021 | Jul 27, 2021 | | |
| SpongeBob SquarePants: Battle for Bikini Bottom – Rehydrated | Action-adventure; platform | Purple Lamp Studios | THQ Nordic | Jun 23, 2020 | Jun 23, 2020 | Jun 23, 2020 | | |
| SpongeBob SquarePants: The Cosmic Shake | Action-adventure; platform | Purple Lamp Studios | THQ Nordic | 2023 | 2023 | 2023 | | |
| Spy Chameleon | Puzzle | Unfinished Pixel | Unfinished Pixel | Unreleased | May 22, 2015 | May 22, 2015 | | |
| Spyro Reignited Trilogy | Action & adventure | Toys For Bob | Activision | Nov 13, 2018 | Nov 13, 2018 | Nov 13, 2018 | | |
| Squadron 51 | Shoot 'em up | Loomiarts | Assemble Entertainment | Unreleased | 2022 | 2022 | | |
| Squid Hero for Kinect | Family, motion controlled | Virtual Air Guitar Company | Virtual Air Guitar Company | Unreleased | Jul 29, 2015 | Jul 29, 2015 | K | |
| Squish and the Corrupted Crystal | Platformer | Cheat Code Studios | Cheat Code Studios | Sep 4, 2017 | Sep 4, 2017 | Sep 4, 2017 | | |
| Stab Stab Stab! | Party brawler | Sbug | Couch Monster | Unreleased | Feb 28, 2020 | Feb 28, 2020 | X | |
| Standpoint | Platformer | Unruly Attractions | Unruly Attractions | Unreleased | Sep 30, 2015 | Sep 30, 2015 | | |
| Star Balls | Puzzle, Action & Adventure | Bolder Games | Bolder Games | Unreleased | May 30, 2017 | May 30, 2017 | | |
| Star Hammer: The Vanguard Prophecy | Turn-based strategy | Black Lab Games | Slitherine | Unreleased | Jul 26, 2016 | Aug 24, 2016 | | |
| Star Renegades | Role-playing | Massive Damage, Inc. | Raw Fury | Unreleased | Nov 19, 2020 | Nov 19, 2020 | | |
| Star Wars Battlefront | Action; Shooter | EA Digital Illusions CE | Electronic Arts; LucasArts | Nov 19, 2015 | Nov 17, 2015 | Nov 19, 2015 | | |
| Star Wars Battlefront II | Action; Shooter | DICE; EA Motive | Electronic Arts; LucasArts | Nov 17, 2017 | Nov 17, 2017 | Nov 17, 2017 | X | |
| Star Wars Jedi: Fallen Order | Action-adventure | Respawn Entertainment | Electronic Arts | Nov 15, 2019 | Nov 15, 2019 | Nov 15, 2019 | | |
| Starbound | Adventure; role-playing | Chucklefish | Chucklefish | Unreleased | TBA | TBA | | |
| Stardew Valley | Adventure, Role-playing | ConcernedApe | ConcernedApe | Dec 14, 2016 | Dec 14, 2016 | Dec 14, 2016 | | |
| Stardust Galaxy Warriors: Stellar Climax | Shoot 'em up | Dreamloop Games | Dreamloop Games | Unreleased | Sep 8, 2016 | Sep 8, 2016 | | |
| Starlink: Battle for Atlas | Space combat | Ubisoft Toronto | Ubisoft | Oct 16, 2018 | Oct 16, 2018 | Oct 16, 2018 | | |
| Starpoint Gemini 2 | Space trading and combat game; Role-playing | Little Green Men Games | Little Green Men Games | Sep 26, 2014 | Sep 26, 2014 | Sep 26, 2014 | | |
| Starpoint Gemini: Warlords | Space trading and combat game, Role-playing | Little Green Men Games | Little Green Men Games | Feb 9, 2018 | Feb 9, 2018 | Feb 9, 2018 | | |
| Starwhal: Just the Tip | Action & Adventure, Fighting | Breakfall | Breakfall | Unreleased | Dec 9, 2015 | Dec 9, 2015 | | |
| Stash: No Loot Left Behind | Role-playing | FrogDice | FrogDice | Unreleased | TBA | TBA | | |
| State of Anarchy: Master of Mayhem | Shoot 'em up | Lapovich | Sometimes You | Unreleased | Aug 1, 2018 | Aug 1, 2018 | X | |
| State of Decay: Year One Survival Edition | Stealth, survival horror | Undead Labs | Xbox Game Studios | Apr 28, 2015 | Apr 28, 2015 | Apr 28, 2015 | | |
| State of Decay 2 | Survival horror | Undead Labs | Xbox Game Studios | May 22, 2018 | May 22, 2018 | May 22, 2018 | PA PC | |
| State of Mind | Adventure | Daedalic Entertainment | Daedalic Entertainment | Aug 15, 2018 | Aug 15, 2018 | Aug 15, 2018 | | |
| The Station | Adventure | The Station Game | The Station Game | Feb 20, 2018 | Feb 20, 2018 | Feb 20, 2018 | | |
| Stay | Adventure | Appnormals Team | PQube | May 30, 2018 | May 30, 2018 | May 30, 2018 | | |
| Stay Cool, Kobayashi-san!: A River City Ransom Story | Beat 'em up | Arc System Works | Arc System Works | Nov 7, 2019 | Nov 7, 2019 | Nov 7, 2019 | | |
| Stealth Inc. 2: A Game of Clones | Platform, stealth | Curve Studios | Curve Digital | Apr 3, 2015 | Apr 3, 2015 | Apr 3, 2015 | | |
| Steamroll | Arcade-puzzler | Anticto | Anticto | Jan 25, 2019 | Jan 25, 2019 | Jan 25, 2019 | X | |
| SteamWorld Dig | Platform, metroidvania | Image & Form | Image & Form | Unreleased | Jun 5, 2015 | Jun 5, 2015 | | |
| SteamWorld Dig 2 | Platform, metroidvania | Image & Form | Image & Form | Unreleased | Nov 21, 2018 | Nov 21, 2018 | | |
| Steel Rain X | Shoot 'em up, strategy, role-playing | Polarity Flow | Polarity Flow | Unreleased | Dec 16, 2016 | Dec 16, 2016 | | |
| Steel Rats | Action | Tate Multimedia | Tate Multimedia | Unreleased | May 17, 2019 | May 17, 2019 | | |
| Steep | Sports | Ubisoft Annecy | Ubisoft | Dec 21, 2016 | Dec 2, 2016 | Dec 2, 2016 | X | |
| Steins;Gate 0 | Visual novel | 5pb. | Mages | Feb 22, 2017 | Unreleased | Unreleased | | |
| Stela | Puzzle-platformer | Skybox Labs | Skybox Labs | Oct 17, 2019 | Oct 17, 2019 | Oct 17, 2019 | X | |
| Stellaris | 4X Strategy | Tantalus Media, Paradox Interactive | Paradox Interactive | Unreleased | Feb 22, 2019 | Feb 22, 2019 | | |
| Stellatum | Shoot 'em up | Satur Entertainment | Sometimes You | Oct 9, 2019 | Oct 9, 2019 | Oct 9, 2019 | X | |
| Steredenn | Shoot 'em up | Pixelnest Studio | Plug In Digital | Unreleased | Apr 1, 2016 | Apr 1, 2016 | | |
| Steven Universe: Save the Light | Role-playing | Grumpyface Studios | Cartoon Network Games | Unreleased | Nov 3, 2017 | Nov 3, 2017 | | |
| Stick It to the Man! | Platformer | Zoink | Ripstone | Unreleased | Aug 28, 2014 | Aug 28, 2014 | | |
| Stickbold! A Dodgeball Adventure | Sports | Game Swing | Curve Digital | Unreleased | Apr 8, 2016 | Apr 8, 2016 | | |
| Sticktype | Platformer | Mike Palotas | Mike Palotas | Nov 9, 2018 | Nov 9, 2018 | Nov 9, 2018 | | |
| Stone | Adventure | Convict Games | Convict Games | Jan 27, 2020 | Jan 27, 2020 | Jan 27, 2020 | X | |
| Stories of Bethem: Full Moon | Action & Adventure | GuGames Development | GuGames Development | Unreleased | Sep 1, 2016 | Sep 1, 2016 | | |
| Stories: The Path of Destinies | Action role-playing | Spearhead Games, Nephilim Game Studios | Digerati | Unreleased | Mar 22, 2019 | Mar 22, 2019 | X | |
| Stories Untold | Adventure; horror | No Code | Devolver Digital | Unreleased | Oct 27, 2020 | Oct 27, 2020 | | |
| Storm Boy | Kids & Family | Blowfish Studios | Blowfish Studios | Unreleased | Nov 20, 2018 | Nov 20, 2018 | X | |
| The Story Goes On | Roguelike Action-RPG | Scarecrow Arts | Kiss Publishing | Unreleased | Mar 2, 2018 | Mar 2, 2018 | | |
| Story of a Gladiator | Action, Fighting | Brain Seal | Brain Seal | Nov 27, 2019 | Nov 27, 2019 | Nov 27, 2019 | | |
| Straimium Immortaly | Roguelite shoot 'em up | Antohony Case, Stage Clear Studios | Digerati | Dec 24, 2019 | Dec 24, 2019 | Dec 24, 2019 | | |
| Stranded Deep | Survival | Beam Team Games | Beam Team Games | Unreleased | Apr 21, 2020 | Apr 21, 2020 | | |
| Stranded Sails: Explorers of the Cursed Isles | Survival adventure | Lemonbomb Entertainment | Merge Games | Oct 17, 2019 | Oct 17, 2019 | Oct 17, 2019 | | |
| Strange Brigade | Third-person shooter | Rebellion Developments | Rebellion Developments | Unreleased | Aug 28, 2018 | Aug 28, 2018 | X | |
| Stranger of Paradise: Final Fantasy Origin | Action role-playing | Team Ninja | Square Enix | Mar 18, 2022 | Mar 18, 2022 | Mar 18, 2022 | | |
| Stranger of Sword City | Japanese role-playing, dungeon crawler | Experience | Experience | Mar 24, 2016 | Mar 22, 2016 | Mar 29, 2016 | | |
| Stranger Things 3: The Game | Action-adventure, Retro | Bonusxp | Bonusxp | Jul 4, 2019 | Jul 4, 2019 | Jul 4, 2019 | | |
| Street Fighter 30th Anniversary Collection | Fighting | Capcom | Capcom | May 29, 2018 | May 29, 2018 | May 29, 2018 | | |
| Streets of Rage 4 | Beat 'em up | Lizardcube, Guard Crush Games, Sega | DotEmu | Apr 30, 2020 | Apr 30, 2020 | Apr 30, 2020 | | |
| Streets of Rogue | Roguelite ARPG | Matt Dabrowski | TinyBuild | Jul 12, 2019 | Jul 12, 2019 | Jul 12, 2019 | X | |
| Street Outlaws: The List | Racing | Team6 Game Studios | GameMill Entertainment | Unreleased | Oct 22, 2019 | Oct 21, 2019 | | |
| Strength of the Sword: Ultimate | Fighting game | Ivent | Ivent | Aug 23, 2019 | Aug 23, 2019 | Aug 23, 2019 | | |
| Strider | Action-adventure; platform | Double Helix Games | Capcom | Sep 4, 2014 | Feb 19, 2014 | Feb 19, 2014 | | |
| Strike Suit Zero: Director's Cut | Space combat simulator | Born Ready Games | Born Ready Games | Apr 4, 2014 | Apr 4, 2014 | Apr 4, 2014 | | |
| Stubbs the Zombie in Rebel Without a Pulse | Action | Wideload Games | Aspyr | Unreleased | Mar 16, 2021 | Mar 16, 2021 | | |
| Stumble Guys | Casual | Scopely | Scopely | Jan 23, 2024 | Jan 23, 2024 | Jan 23, 2024 | | |
| Stunt Kite Party | Action, Party | HandyGames | THQ Nordic | Unreleased | Jun 7, 2019 | Jun 7, 2019 | | |
| Sturmwind Ex | Shoot 'em up | Duranik | B-alive | Nov 8, 2019 | Nov 8, 2019 | Nov 8, 2019 | X | |
| Styx: Master of Shadows | Action-adventure, Stealth | Cyanide Studio | Focus Home Interactive | Oct 7, 2014 | Oct 7, 2014 | Oct 7, 2014 | | |
| Styx: Shards of Darkness | Action-adventure, Stealth | Cyanide Studio | Focus Home Interactive | Mar 14, 2017 | Mar 14, 2017 | Mar 14, 2017 | | |
| Subaeria | Action, roguelite | Illogika | Illogika | Unreleased | May 9, 2018 | May 9, 2018 | | |
| SubaraCity | Puzzle, Casual | Ryuji Kuwaki, Flyhigh Works | Esquadra | Aug 27, 2019 | Aug 28, 2019 | Aug 27, 2019 | | |
| Subdivision Infinity DX | Space Combat Simulator | Mistfly Games | Blowfish Studios | Unreleased | Aug 8, 2019 | Aug 7, 2019 | X | |
| Subject 13 | Adventure | Koneko | Microids | Unreleased | Jan 30, 2017 | Jan 30, 2017 | | |
| Sublevel Zero Redux | Shooter | Sigtrap Games | Merge Games | Unreleased | Mar 7, 2017 | Mar 7, 2017 | | |
| Submerged | Action & Adventure, Platformer | Uppercut Games | Uppercut Games | Aug 7, 2015 | Aug 7, 2015 | Aug 7, 2015 | | |
| Subnautica | Action & Adventure, Survival | Unknown Worlds / Grip Games | Unknown Worlds Entertainment | Unreleased | Dec 4, 2018 | Dec 4, 2018 | X | |
| Suikoden I & II HD Remaster: Gate Rune and Dunan Unification Wars | Tactical role-playing | Konami Digital Entertainment | Konami Digital Entertainment | Mar 6, 2025 | Mar 6, 2025 | Mar 6, 2025 | | |
| Subterrain | Action & Adventure, Survival | Pixellore | Pixellore | Jan 27, 2017 | Jan 27, 2017 | Jan 27, 2017 | | |
| Sudden Strike 4: European Battlefields Edition | Real-time tactics | Kite Games | Kalypso Media | May 29, 2018 | May 29, 2018 | May 29, 2018 | | |
| The Sun and Moon | Puzzle | Daniel Linssen | Digerati | Unreleased | Jan 27, 2017 | Jan 27, 2017 | | |
| Sundered: Eldritch Edition | Roguelite Metroidvania | Thunder Lotus Games | Thunder Lotus Games | Dec 21, 2018 | Dec 21, 2018 | Dec 21, 2018 | | |
| Sunset Overdrive | Open world, Shooter | Insomniac Games | Xbox Game Studios | Oct 30, 2014 | Oct 28, 2014 | Oct 31, 2014 | | |
| Sunshine Manor | Horror; role-playing | Fossil Games | Fossil Games | Unreleased | 2022 | 2022 | | |
| Sunshower | Action-adventure | NOKOGODO | NOKOGODO | Apr 16, 2025 | Apr 16, 2025 | Apr 16, 2025 | | |
| Super Blackjack Battle II Turbo Edition | Card, Fighting | Stage Clear Studios | Headup Games | Unreleased | Jul 25, 2018 | Jul 25, 2018 | | |
| Super Blood Hockey | Sports | Loren Lemcke, Kittehface Software | Digerati | Jun 7, 2019 | Jun 7, 2019 | Jun 7, 2019 | | |
| Super Bomb Rush! | Puzzle, Strategy | Curvature Systems | Curvature Systems | Jun 21, 2017 | Jun 21, 2017 | Jun 21, 2017 | | |
| Super Bomberman R | Action, maze | Konami Digital Entertainment | Konami | Jun 12, 2018 | Jun 12, 2018 | Jun 12, 2018 | | |
| Super Box Land Demake | Puzzle | Lightup | Ratalaika Games | Oct 9, 2019 | Oct 9, 2019 | Oct 9, 2019 | | |
| Super Cloudbuilt | Platform, Parkour | Coilworks | Double Eleven | Jul 28, 2017 | Jul 28, 2017 | Jul 28, 2017 | | |
| Super Comboman: Smash Edition | Action | Flashman Games | Flashman Games | Aug 22, 2017 | Aug 22, 2017 | Aug 22, 2017 | | |
| Super Destronaut DX | Shoot 'em up | Petite Games | Ratalaika Games | Unreleased | Jul 11, 2018 | Jul 11, 2018 | | |
| Super Destronaut: Land Wars | Shooter | Petite Games | Ratalaika Games | Mar 11, 2020 | Mar 11, 2020 | Mar 11, 2020 | | |
| Super Dodgeball Beats | Music/Rhythm, Sports | Finalboss Games | Playstack | Unreleased | Sep 12, 2019 | Sep 12, 2019 | | |
| Super Dungeon Bros | Role-playing | React Games | Wired Productions | Nov 1, 2016 | Nov 1, 2016 | Nov 1, 2016 | PC | |
| Super Hydorah | Action & Adventure, Shooter | Abylight Studios | Abylight Studios | Sep 20, 2017 | Sep 20, 2017 | Sep 20, 2017 | | |
| Super Hyperactive Ninja | Platformer | JanduSoft | JanduSoft | Unreleased | May 25, 2018 | May 25, 2018 | | |
| Super Lucky's Tale | Platform | Playful Corp | Xbox Game Studios | Nov 7, 2017 | Nov 7, 2017 | Nov 7, 2017 | PA X | |
| Super Meat Boy Forever | Platform | Team Meat | Team Meat | Unreleased | Apr 16, 2021 | Apr 16, 2021 | | |
| Super Mega Baseball | Sports | Metalhead Software | Metalhead Software | Aug 14, 2015 | Aug 14, 2015 | Aug 14, 2015 | | |
| Super Mega Baseball 2 | Sports | Metalhead Software | Metalhead Software | May 1, 2018 | May 1, 2018 | May 1, 2018 | X | |
| Super Mega Baseball 3 | Sports | Metalhead Software | Metalhead Software | May 13, 2020 | May 13, 2020 | May 13, 2020 | | |
| Super Mega Space Blaster Special Turbo | Arcade, shoot 'em up | Bare Knuckle Developments | Bare Knuckle Developments | Unreleased | Feb 12, 2020 | Feb 12, 2020 | X | |
| Super Monkey Ball: Banana Blitz | Platform | Sega | Sega | Oct 30, 2019 | Oct 29, 2019 | Oct 29, 2019 | | |
| Super Monkey Ball: Banana Mania | Platform | Ryu Ga Gotoku Studio | Sega | Oct 7, 2021 | Oct 5, 2021 | Oct 5, 2021 | | |
| Super Mutant Alien Assault | Shooter, Platformer | Cybernate | Surprise Attack Games | Jul 12, 2016 | Jul 12, 2016 | Jul 12, 2016 | | |
| Super Night Riders | Racing | Neko Works | Neko Works | May 18, 2016 | May 18, 2016 | May 18, 2016 | X | |
| Super Party Sports: Football | Puzzle | HandyGames | HandyGames | Unreleased | Dec 4, 2015 | Dec 4, 2015 | | |
| Super Pixel Racers | Racing | 21c Ducks | H2 Interactive; PQube | Nov 1, 2018 | Nov 1, 2018 | Nov 1, 2018 | X | |
| Super Space Serpent SE | Twin-stick shooter | Petrus Games | Productions Associees | Unreleased | May 10, 2019 | May 10, 2019 | PA | |
| Super Star Blast | Shoot 'em up, Arcade | EntwicklerX | EntwicklerX | Aug 2, 2019 | Aug 2, 2019 | Aug 2, 2019 | X | |
| Super Street: The Game | Racing | Team6 Game Studios | Lion Castle | Unreleased | Sep 11, 2018 | Sep 11, 2018 | | |
| Super Tennis Blast | Sports | Unfinished Pixel | Unfinished Pixel | May 24, 2019 | May 24, 2019 | May 24, 2019 | | |
| Super Time Force | Shooter; side scroller | Capybara Games | Capybara Games | May 14, 2014 | May 14, 2014 | May 14, 2014 | | |
| Super Toy Cars | Racing | Eclipse Games | Eclipse Games | Unreleased | Sep 4, 2015 | Sep 4, 2015 | | |
| Super Volley Blast | Sports | Unfinished Pixel | Unfinished Pixel | Oct 31, 2018 | Oct 31, 2018 | Oct 31, 2018 | | |
| Super Weekend Mode | Arcade | Pixelteriyaki | Ratalaika Games | Apr 10, 2019 | Apr 10, 2019 | Apr 10, 2019 | | |
| Super Wiloo Demake | Platformer, Retro | Lightup | Ratalaika Games | Jul 31, 2019 | Jul 31, 2019 | Jul 31, 2019 | | |
| Super Woden GP | Racing | ViJuDa | Eastasiasoft | Nov 9, 2022 | Nov 9, 2022 | Nov 9, 2022 | | |
| Superbeat: Xonic | Music, Rhythm | PM Studios | PM Studios | Jun 6, 2017 | Jun 6, 2017 | Jun 6, 2017 | | |
| SuperEpic: The Entertainment War | Action-adventure, Metroidvania | Undercoders | Numskull Games | Dec 12, 2019 | Dec 12, 2019 | Dec 12, 2019 | | |
| Superhot | First-person shooter | Superhot Team | Superhot Team | May 3, 2016 | May 3, 2016 | May 3, 2016 | | |
| Superhot: Mind Control Delete | First-person shooter | Superhot Team | Superhot Team | May 3, 2016 | May 3, 2016 | May 3, 2016 | | |
| Superliminal | Puzzle | Pillow Castle | Pillow Castle, PlayEveryWare | Jul 7, 2020 | Jul 7, 2020 | Jul 7, 2020 | | |
| Supermarket Shriek | Racing | Billy Goat Entertainment | Billy Goat Entertainment | Jun 9, 2019 | Jun 9, 2019 | Jun 9, 2019 | | |
| Supraland | Platformer; puzzle; action | Supra Games | Humble Games | Oct 22, 2020 | Oct 22, 2020 | Oct 22, 2020 | | |
| The Surge | Role-playing | Deck13 | Focus Home Interactive | May 16, 2017 | May 16, 2017 | May 16, 2017 | X | |
| The Surge 2 | Role-playing | Deck13 | Focus Home Interactive | Sep 24, 2019 | Sep 24, 2019 | Sep 24, 2019 | | |
| Surviving Mars | City-building, construction and management simulation | Haemimont Games | Paradox Interactive | Mar 15, 2018 | Mar 15, 2018 | Mar 15, 2018 | | |
| Surviving the Aftermath | Simulation; city-building | Iceflake Studios | Paradox Interactive | Unreleased | TBA | TBA | | |
| SwapQuest | Puzzle, Role-playing | Rebusmind | Rebusmind | Aug 22, 2017 | Aug 22, 2017 | Aug 22, 2017 | | |
| The Swapper | Platformer; puzzle | Facepalm Games | Curve Digital | Jun 5, 2015 | Jun 5, 2015 | Jun 5, 2015 | | |
| The Swindle | Action & Adventure | Dan Marshall | Curve Digital | Aug 7, 2015 | Aug 7, 2015 | Aug 7, 2015 | | |
| Switch or Die Trying | Puzzle, Platformer | Threye Interactive | Threye Interactive | Feb 28, 2018 | Feb 28, 2018 | Feb 28, 2018 | | |
| Sword Art Online: Alicization Lycoris | Role-playing | Aquria | Bandai Namco Entertainment | May 21, 2020 | May 22, 2020 | May 22, 2020 | | |
| Sword Art Online: Fatal Bullet | Role-playing, Shooter | Dimps | Bandai Namco Entertainment | Feb 23, 2018 | Feb 23, 2018 | Feb 23, 2018 | | |
| Sword Art Online: Last Recollection | Action role-playing | Aquria | Bandai Namco Entertainment | Oct 6, 2023 | Oct 6, 2023 | Oct 6, 2023 | | |
| Sword Coast Legends | Role-playing | n-Space; Digital Extremes | n-Space; Digital Extremes | Jul 20, 2016 | Jul 20, 2016 | Jul 20, 2016 | | |
| Sword of the Necromancer | Roguelike; role-playing | Grimorio of Games | JanduSoft | Jan 28, 2021 | Jan 28, 2021 | Jan 28, 2021 | | |
| Syberia III | Adventure | Anuman Interactive | Microïds | Unreleased | Apr 25, 2017 | Apr 20, 2017 | | |
| Sylvio | Action & Adventure | Stroboskop | Stroboskop | Jan 13, 2017 | Jan 13, 2017 | Jan 13, 2017 | | |
| Symmetry | Management, Survival | Sleepless Clinic | Imgn Pro | Feb 23, 2018 | Feb 23, 2018 | Feb 23, 2018 | | |
| Syndrome | Survival, Horror | Camel 101 | BigMoon Entertainment | Sep 28, 2017 | Sep 28, 2017 | Sep 28, 2017 | | |
| Synthetik: Ultimate | Top-down shooter | Flow Fire | Flow Fire | Unreleased | Dec 16, 2020 | Dec 16, 2020 | | |
| Syrup and the Ultimate Sweet | Visual novel | NomnomNami | Ratalaika Games | Mar 4, 2020 | Mar 4, 2020 | Mar 4, 2020 | | |
| System Shock | Action role-playing | Night Dive Studios | Prime Matter | May 21, 2024 | May 21, 2024 | May 21, 2024 | | |
| Table Top Racing: World Tour | Racing | Playrise Digital | Playrise Digital | May 3, 2016 | May 3, 2016 | May 3, 2016 | | |
| Tachyon Project | Shooter | Eclipse Games | Eclipse Games | Aug 22, 2017 | Jul 15, 2015 | Jul 15, 2015 | | |
| Tacoma | Adventure | Fullbright | Fullbright | Aug 2, 2017 | Aug 2, 2017 | Aug 2, 2017 | PA X | |
| Tactics V: Obsidian Brigade | Tactical role-playing | Nothing Games Studios | Nothing Games Studios | Aug 8, 2019 | Aug 9, 2019 | Aug 8, 2019 | | |
| Taiko no Tatsujin: The Drum Master | Rhythm | Bandai Namco Amusement Lab | Bandai Namco Entertainment | Jan 27, 2022 | Jan 27, 2022 | Jan 27, 2022 | | |
| Taimumari: Complete Edition | Platformer | Ternox | Victory Road | Unreleased | Apr 21, 2020 | Apr 21, 2020 | | |
| Talent Not Included | Platformer | Frima Games Studio | Frima Games Studio | Apr 5, 2017 | Apr 5, 2017 | Apr 5, 2017 | | |
| Tales from the Borderlands | Graphic adventure | Telltale Games | Telltale Games | Nov 26, 2014 | Nov 26, 2014 | Nov 26, 2014 | | |
| Tales of Arise | Action role-playing | Bandai Namco Games | Bandai Namco Entertainment | Sep 9, 2021 | Sep 10, 2021 | Sep 10, 2021 | | |
| Tales of Graces f Remastered | Role-playing | Tose | Bandai Namco Entertainment | Jan 17, 2025 | Jan 17, 2025 | Jan 17, 2025 | | |
| Tales of Vesperia: Definitive Edition | Role-playing | Bandai Namco Games | Bandai Namco Entertainment | Jan 11, 2019 | Jan 11, 2019 | Jan 11, 2019 | | |
| The Talos Principle | First Person Puzzler | Croteam | Devolver Digital | Unreleased | Aug 31, 2018 | Aug 31, 2018 | X | |
| Tamashii | Puzzle-platformer, Horror | Vikinator, Stage Clear Studios | Digerati | Dec 24, 2019 | Dec 24, 2019 | Dec 24, 2019 | | |
| Tandem: A Tale of Shadows | Puzzle; platform | Monochrome | Hatinh Interactive | Unreleased | Oct 21, 2021 | Oct 21, 2021 | | |
| Tango Fiesta | Action | Spilt Milk Studios | Merge Games | May 16, 2017 | May 16, 2017 | May 16, 2017 | | |
| Tanky Tanks | Arcade | Epixr | Epixr | Nov 8, 2019 | Nov 8, 2019 | Nov 8, 2019 | X | |
| Taxi Chaos | Racing | Team6 Game Studios | Lion Castle Entertainment | Feb 23, 2021 | Feb 23, 2021 | Feb 23, 2021 | | |
| Team Sonic Racing | Racing | Sumo Digital | Sega | May 21, 2019 | May 21, 2019 | May 21, 2019 | | |
| Tears of Avia | Turn-based strategy | CooCooSqueaky | PQube | Unreleased | Sep 24, 2020 | Sep 24, 2020 | | |
| The Technomancer | Role-playing | Spiders | Focus Home Interactive | Jun 28, 2016 | Jun 28, 2016 | Jun 28, 2016 | | |
| Teenage Mutant Ninja Turtles: Mutants in Manhattan | Action & Adventure | PlatinumGames | Activision | May 24, 2016 | May 24, 2016 | May 24, 2016 | | |
| Teenage Mutant Ninja Turtles: Shredder's Revenge | Beat 'Em Up | Tribute Games | Dotemu | Jun 16, 2022 | Jun 16, 2022 | Jun 16, 2022 | | |
| Tekken 7 | Fighting | Bandai Namco Entertainment | Bandai Namco Entertainment | Jun 2, 2017 | Jun 2, 2017 | Jun 2, 2017 | | |
| Telling Lies | FMV adventure | Sam Barlow | Annapurna Interactive | Apr 30, 2020 | Apr 28, 2020 | Apr 28, 2020 | | |
| Tempest 4000 | Shoot 'em up | Llamasoft | Atari | Unreleased | Jun 12, 2018 | Jun 12, 2018 | | |
| Tennis in the Face | Puzzle | 10tons | 10tons | Dec 8, 2016 | Dec 8, 2016 | Dec 8, 2016 | | |
| Tennis World Tour | Sports | Breakpoint Studio | Bigben Interactive | May 22, 2018 | May 22, 2018 | May 22, 2018 | | |
| Tennis World Tour 2 | Sports | Big Ant Studios | Nacon | Sep 24, 2020 | Sep 24, 2020 | Sep 24, 2020 | | |
| Terraria | Sandbox | Engine Software | 505 Games | Nov 14, 2014 | Nov 14, 2014 | Nov 14, 2014 | | |
| TerraTech | Vehicular Sandbox | Payload Studios | Payload Studios | Unreleased | Aug 10, 2018 | Aug 10, 2018 | | |
| Tesla vs Lovecraft | Shoot 'em up | 10tons | 10tons | Mar 16, 2018 | Mar 16, 2018 | Mar 16, 2018 | | |
| Teslagrad | Platformer | Rain Games | Rain Games | Mar 9, 2016 | Mar 9, 2016 | Mar 9, 2016 | | |
| Teslapunk | Shooter | klutzGames | klutzGames | Unreleased | Oct 7, 2015 | Oct 7, 2015 | | |
| Tetraminos | Puzzle | Sanuk Games | Bigben Interactive | Unreleased | Mar 8, 2016 | Mar 8, 2016 | | |
| Tetra's Escape | Puzzle | ABX Game Studios | Ratalaika Games | Unreleased | Aug 8, 2018 | Aug 8, 2018 | | |
| Tetris Effect Connected | Puzzle | Monstars; Resonair | Enhance Games | Nov 10, 2020 | Nov 10, 2020 | Nov 10, 2020 | | |
| Tetris Ultimate | Puzzle | SoMa Play | Ubisoft | Dec 17, 2014 | Dec 17, 2014 | Dec 17, 2014 | | |
| Tetrobot and Co. | Puzzle | Swing Swing Submarine | Neko Entertainment | Unreleased | Mar 16, 2016 | Mar 16, 2016 | | |
| Tetsumo Party | Party game | Monster Couch | Monster Couch | Jul 26, 2019 | Jul 26, 2019 | Jul 26, 2019 | | |
| Thea: The Awakening | Strategy, Simulation | MuHa Games | MuHa Games | Unreleased | May 31, 2017 | May 31, 2017 | | |
| TheHunter: Call of the Wild | Sport, Simulation | Expansive Worlds | Avalanche Studios | Oct 2, 2017 | Oct 2, 2017 | Oct 2, 2017 | X | |
| They Are Billions | Strategy, RTS | Numantian Games | BlitWorks | Jul 5, 2019 | Jul 5, 2019 | Jul 5, 2019 | | |
| Thief | Stealth | Eidos Montréal | Square Enix | Sep 4, 2014 | Feb 25, 2014 | Feb 28, 2014 | | |
| Thief of Thieves: Season One | Adventure, Stealth | Rival Games | Rival Games | Nov 10, 2018 | Nov 10, 2018 | Nov 10, 2018 | | |
| Thief Simulator | Action, Stealth | Noble Muffins, Console Labs | Playway | Unreleased | Feb 19, 2020 | Feb 19, 2020 | | |
| Thimbleweed Park | Point & Click Adventure | Ron Gilbert & Gary Winnick | Ron Gilbert & Gary Winnick | Mar 30, 2017 | Mar 30, 2017 | Mar 30, 2017 | PA | |
| Think of the Children | Co-op strategy-sim | Jammed Up Studios | Fellow Traveler | Unreleased | Sep 26, 2018 | Sep 26, 2018 | | |
| This Is the Police | Strategy, Management | Weappy Studio | THQ Nordic | Unreleased | Mar 22, 2017 | Mar 22, 2017 | | |
| This Is the Police 2 | Strategy, Management | Weappy Studio | THQ Nordic | Unreleased | Sep 25, 2018 | Sep 25, 2018 | | |
| This War of Mine: The Little Ones | Action & Adventure | 11 Bit Studios | Deep Silver | Unreleased | Jan 29, 2016 | Jan 29, 2016 | | |
| Thomas & Friends: Wonders of Sodor | Adventure; simulation | Dovetail Games | Dovetail Games | Mar 17, 2026 | Mar 17, 2026 | Mar 17, 2026 | | |
| Thomas Was Alone | Puzzle, platform | Curve Digital | Curve Digital | Jan 16, 2015 | Nov 21, 2014 | Nov 21, 2014 | | |
| Three Fourths Home: Extended Edition | Visual novel | [bracket] Games | Digerati | Oct 9, 2015 | Oct 9, 2015 | Oct 9, 2015 | | |
| Threes | Puzzle | Hidden Variable; Sirvo | Sirvo | Dec 4, 2014 | Dec 4, 2014 | Dec 4, 2014 | | |
| Thronebreaker: The Witcher Tales | Collectible card game; role playing | CD Projekt | CD Projekt | Dec 4, 2018 | Dec 4, 2018 | Dec 4, 2018 | | |
| Throne Quest Deluxe | Action role-playing | Valorware | Valorware | Unreleased | Sep 4, 2019 | Sep 9, 2019 | | |
| Through the Woods | Horror | Antagonist | 1C Company | May 2, 2018 | May 2, 2018 | May 2, 2018 | | |
| Thumper | Music; rhythm | Drool | Drool | Aug 18, 2017 | Aug 18, 2017 | Aug 18, 2017 | X | |
| Thunder Paw | Action, run & gun | Sergio Poverony | Ratalaika Games | Mar 18, 2020 | Mar 18, 2020 | Mar 18, 2020 | | |
| Ticket to Ride | Strategy, board game | Asmodee Digital | Asmodee Digital | Dec 10, 2019 | Dec 10, 2019 | Dec 10, 2019 | | |
| Tiles | Puzzle | Romans I XVI Gaming | Romans I XVI Gaming | Feb 20, 2018 | Feb 20, 2018 | Feb 20, 2018 | PA | |
| Time Carnage | Rail Shooter | Wales Interactive | Wales Interactive | Sep 12, 2018 | Sep 12, 2018 | Sep 12, 2018 | | |
| Time Recoil | Shooter | 10tons | 10tons | Sep 14, 2017 | Sep 14, 2017 | Sep 14, 2017 | | |
| Timespinner | Metroidvania, Action-adventure | Lunar Ray Games | Chucklefish | Unreleased | Jun 4, 2019 | Jun 4, 2019 | | |
| Tiny Tina's Wonderlands | Action role-playing; first-person shooter | Gearbox Software | 2K | Mar 25, 2022 | Mar 25, 2022 | Mar 25, 2022 | | |
| Tiny Troopers: Joint Ops | Shooter | Epiphany Games | Wired Productions | Unreleased | Feb 26, 2016 | Feb 26, 2016 | | |
| Titan Quest | Action; Role-playing | Black Forest Games | THQ Nordic | Mar 20, 2018 | Mar 20, 2018 | Mar 20, 2018 | | |
| Titanfall | First-person shooter; mecha | Respawn Entertainment | Electronic Arts | Sep 4, 2014 | Mar 11, 2014 | Mar 13, 2014 | | |
| Titanfall 2 | First-person shooter; mecha | Respawn Entertainment | Electronic Arts | Oct 28, 2016 | Oct 28, 2016 | Oct 28, 2016 | X | |
| Toby: The Secret Mine | action-adventure; platform | Lukáš Navrátil Games | Headup Games | Jan 20, 2017 | Jan 20, 2017 | Jan 20, 2017 | | |
| ToeJam & Earl: Back in the Groove | Adventure | HumaNature Studios | HumaNature Studios | Mar 1, 2019 | Mar 1, 2019 | Mar 1, 2019 | | |
| TOHU | Adventure | Fireart Games | The Irregular Corporation | Jan 28, 2021 | Jan 28, 2021 | Jan 28, 2021 | | |
| Toki Juju Densetsu | Platformer | Microids | Microids | Jun 17, 2019 | Jun 17, 2019 | Jun 17, 2019 | | |
| Tokyo 42 | Action | Smac Games | Mode 7 | May 31, 2017 | May 31, 2017 | May 31, 2017 | | |
| Tokyo Warfare Turbo | Shooter | Pablo Vidaurre Sanz | Pablo Vidaurre Sanz | Nov 14, 2019 | Nov 15, 2019 | Nov 14, 2019 | X | |
| Tom Clancy's Ghost Recon Breakpoint | Third-person shooter; looter shooter | Ubisoft Paris | Ubisoft | Oct 4, 2019 | Oct 4, 2019 | Oct 4, 2019 | X | |
| Tom Clancy's Ghost Recon Wildlands | Third-person shooter; tactical shooter | Ubisoft Paris | Ubisoft | Mar 7, 2017 | Mar 7, 2017 | Mar 7, 2017 | X | |
| Tom Clancy's The Division | Third-person shooter; action role-playing | Massive Entertainment | Ubisoft | Mar 8, 2016 | Mar 8, 2016 | Mar 8, 2016 | X | |
| Tom Clancy's The Division 2 | Third-person shooter; action role-playing | Massive Entertainment | Ubisoft | Mar 15, 2019 | Mar 15, 2019 | Mar 15, 2019 | X | |
| Tom Clancy's Rainbow Six Extraction | First-person shooter | Ubisoft Montreal | Ubisoft | Jan 20, 2022 | Jan 20, 2022 | Jan 20, 2022 | | |
| Tom Clancy's Rainbow Six Siege | First-person shooter | Ubisoft Montreal, Red Storm Entertainment, Ubisoft Toronto | Ubisoft | Dec 1, 2015 | Dec 1, 2015 | Dec 1, 2015 | | |
| Tomb Raider: Definitive Edition | Action-adventure | Crystal Dynamics | Square Enix | Sep 4, 2014 | Jan 28, 2014 | Jan 31, 2014 | K | |
| Tomb Raider I–III Remastered | Action-adventure | Aspyr | Aspyr, Crystal Dynamics | Feb 14, 2024 | Feb 14, 2024 | Feb 14, 2024 | | |
| Tony Hawk's Pro Skater 1 + 2 | Sports | Vicarious Visions | Activision | Sep 4, 2020 | Sep 4, 2020 | Sep 4, 2020 | X | |
| Tony Hawk's Pro Skater 3 + 4 | Sports | Iron Galaxy | Activision | Jul 11, 2025 | Jul 11, 2025 | Jul 11, 2025 | PA | |
| Tony Hawk's Pro Skater 5 | Sports | Robomondo | Activision | Unreleased | Sep 30, 2015 | Oct 2, 2015 | | |
| Tony Stewart's Sprint Car Racing | Racing | Monster Games | Monster Games | Feb 14, 2020 | Feb 14, 2020 | Feb 14, 2020 | | |
| Tools Up! | Party game | The Knights of Unity | All In! Games | Dec 3, 2019 | Dec 3, 2019 | Dec 3, 2019 | | |
| Top Run | Endless runner, action | Katata Games | Fantastico Studio | Jan 31, 2020 | Jan 31, 2020 | Jan 31, 2020 | X | |
| Torchlight II | Action role-playing | Runic Games; Panic Button | Perfect World Entertainment | Sep 3, 2019 | Sep 3, 2019 | Sep 3, 2019 | | |
| Torchlight III | Action role-playing | Echtra Games | Perfect World Entertainment | Unreleased | Oct 13, 2020 | Oct 13, 2020 | | |
| Torment: Tides of Numenera | Role-playing | inXile Entertainment | Techland Publishing | Feb 28, 2017 | Feb 28, 2017 | Feb 28, 2017 | | |
| Tormented Souls | Survival horror | Dual Effect | PQube | Feb 25, 2022 | Feb 25, 2022 | Feb 25, 2022 | | |
| Toro | Simulator | Reco Technology | Reco Technology | Unreleased | May 15, 2015 | May 15, 2015 | | |
| TorqueL: Physics Modified Edition | Platformer | Full Power Side Attack | Full Power Side Attack | Oct 17, 2017 | Oct 17, 2017 | Oct 17, 2017 | | |
| Totally Reliable Delivery Service | Action | We’re Five Games | TinyBuild | Apr 1, 2020 | Apr 1, 2020 | Apr 1, 2020 | | |
| Toto Temple Deluxe | Platform arena brawler | Juicy Beast Studio | Juicy Beast Studio | Unreleased | Sep 30, 2015 | Sep 30, 2015 | | |
| Touhou Luna Nights | Platform; Metroidvania | Team Ladybug | Playism | Sep 3, 2020 | Sep 3, 2020 | Sep 3, 2020 | | |
| Tour de France 2015 | Sports | Cyanide Studio | Focus Home Interactive | Unreleased | Jun 18, 2015 | Sep 19, 2015 | | |
| Tour de France 2016 | Sports | Cyanide Studio | Focus Home Interactive | Unreleased | Jun 16, 2016 | Jun 16, 2016 | | |
| Tour de France 2017 | Sports | Cyanide Studio | Focus Home Interactive | Unreleased | Jun 15, 2017 | Jun 15, 2017 | | |
| Tour de France 2018 | Sports | Cyanide Studio | Focus Home Interactive | Unreleased | Jun 28, 2018 | Jun 28, 2018 | | |
| Tour de France 2019 | Sports | Cyanide Studio | Bigben Interactive | Unreleased | Jul 2, 2019 | Jun 27, 2019 | | |
| Tour de France 2020 | Sports | Cyanide Studio | Nacon | Jun 4, 2020 | Jun 4, 2020 | Jun 4, 2020 | | |
| The Touryst | Action-adventure | Shin'en Multimedia | Shin'en Multimedia | Jul 30, 2020 | Jul 30, 2020 | Jul 30, 2020 | | |
| The Tower of Beatrice | Puzzle adventure | Fairy Forest | Sometimes You | Jul 31, 2019 | Jul 31, 2019 | Jul 31, 2019 | X | |
| Tower of Time | Role playing | Event Horizon, Stage Clear Studios | Digerati | Jun 26, 2020 | Jun 26, 2020 | Jun 26, 2020 | | |
| TowerFall Ascension | Arena combat, platform | Matt Thorson | Matt Makes Games | Jan 25, 2017 | Jan 25, 2017 | Jan 25, 2017 | | |
| Tower of Guns | First-person shooter | Terrible Posture Games | Terrible Posture Games | Apr 4, 2015 | Apr 10, 2015 | Apr 4, 2015 | | |
| Townscaper | City Builder | Oskar Stålberg | Oskar Stålberg | Dec 1, 2021 | Dec 1, 2021 | Dec 1, 2021 | | |
| The Town of Light | Adventure, horror | LKA.it | Wired Productions | Nov 16, 2017 | Jun 6, 2017 | Jun 6, 2017 | | |
| Townsmen: A Kingdom Rebuilt | Strategy, Management | HandyGames | HandyGames | Feb 20, 2020 | Feb 20, 2020 | Feb 20, 2020 | | |
| Toy Odyssey | Metroidvania | Hiker Games | Digital Smash | Unreleased | Sep 20, 2016 | Sep 20, 2016 | | |
| Toy Soldiers HD | Action; strategy | Signal Studios | Accelerate Games | Unreleased | Sep 9, 2021 | Sep 9, 2021 | | |
| Toy Soldiers: War Chest | Action; strategy | Signal Studios | Ubisoft | Aug 11, 2015 | Aug 11, 2015 | Aug 11, 2015 | | |
| Trackmania Turbo | Racing | Nadeo | Ubisoft | Mar 22, 2016 | Mar 22, 2016 | Mar 22, 2016 | | |
| Tracks: The Train Set Game | Sandbox, Simulation | Whoop Group | Excalibur Games | Nov 14, 2019 | Nov 14, 2019 | Nov 14, 2019 | X | |
| Trailblazers | Racing | Supergonk | Rising Star Games | May 9, 2018 | May 9, 2018 | May 9, 2018 | | |
| Trailmakers | Vehicular Sandbox, Simulation | Flashbulb Games | Flashbulb Games | Sep 18, 2019 | Sep 18, 2019 | Sep 18, 2019 | | |
| Train Sim World | Simulation | Dovetail Games | Dovetail Games | Jul 24, 2018 | Jul 24, 2018 | Jul 24, 2018 | | |
| Train Sim World 2020 | Simulation | Dovetail Games | Dovetail Games | Unreleased | Aug 15, 2019 | Aug 15, 2019 | | |
| Train Sim World 3 | Simulation | Dovetail Games | Dovetail Games | Sep 6, 2022 | Sep 6, 2022 | Sep 6, 2022 | | |
| Transcripted | Shooter | Alkemi; Seaven Studio | Plug In Digital | Sep 13, 2017 | Sep 13, 2017 | Sep 13, 2017 | X | |
| Transference | Adventure | Ubisoft; SpectreVision | Ubisoft | Sep 18, 2018 | Sep 18, 2018 | Sep 18, 2018 | | |
| Transformers: Battlegrounds | Tactical role-playing | Coatsink | Outright Games | Unreleased | Oct 23, 2020 | Oct 23, 2020 | | |
| Transformers: Devastation | Action; beat 'em up | PlatinumGames | Activision | Unreleased | Oct 6, 2015 | Oct 9, 2015 | | |
| Transformers: Fall of Cybertron | Action; beat 'em up | High Moon Studios; FunLabs | Activision | Unreleased | Aug 9, 2016 | Aug 9, 2016 | | |
| Transformers: Rise of the Dark Spark | Action-adventure | Edge of Reality | Activision | Jun 24, 2014 | Jun 24, 2014 | Jun 24, 2014 | | |
| Transport Giant: Gold Edition | Strategy | Reactor Games | Toplitz Productions | Unreleased | Oct 17, 2018 | Oct 17, 2018 | | |
| Treasure Stack | Puzzle | Pixelakes | Pixelakes | Unreleased | Mar 1, 2019 | Mar 1, 2019 | X | |
| Tricky Towers | Party, puzzle | WeirdBeard | WeirdBeard | Sep 14, 2017 | Sep 14, 2017 | Sep 14, 2017 | | |
| Trine 4: The Nightmare Prince | Action-adventure | Frozenbyte | Modus Games | Oct 7, 2019 | Oct 8, 2019 | Oct 7, 2019 | | |
| Tron RUN/r | Racing | Sanzaru Games | Disney Interactive | Apr 8, 2016 | Apr 8, 2016 | Apr 8, 2016 | | |
| Trover Saves the Universe | Action-adventure | Squanch Games | Squanch Games | Dec 3, 2019 | Dec 3, 2019 | Dec 3, 2019 | | |
| Trials Fusion | Racing; platform | RedLynx | Ubisoft | Sep 4, 2014 | Apr 16, 2014 | Apr 16, 2014 | | |
| Trials of the Blood Dragon | Racing; Platform | RedLynx | Ubisoft | Jun 13, 2016 | Jun 13, 2016 | Jun 13, 2016 | | |
| Trials Rising | Racing; Platform | RedLynx | Ubisoft | Feb 12, 2019 | Feb 12, 2019 | Feb 12, 2019 | | |
| Trivial Pursuit Live! | Board game | Longtail Studios | Ubisoft | Unreleased | Feb 3, 2015 | Feb 17, 2017 | | |
| Troll and I | Action & Adventure | Maximum Games | Maximum Games | Mar 21, 2017 | Mar 21, 2017 | Mar 21, 2017 | | |
| Tropico 5 | Strategy & Simulation | Haemimont Games | Kalypso Media | Unreleased | May 24, 2016 | May 24, 2016 | | |
| Tropico 6 | Strategy & Simulation | Limbic Entertainment | Kalypso Media | Sep 27, 2019 | Sep 27, 2019 | Sep 27, 2019 | | |
| Truck Driver | Simulation | Triangle Games | Soedesco | Sep 19, 2019 | Sep 19, 2019 | Sep 19, 2019 | X | |
| Trüberbrook | Adventure | btf | Headup Games | Unreleased | Apr 17, 2019 | Apr 17, 2019 | | |
| Trulon: The Shadow Engine | role-playing | Kyy Games | Headup Games | Unreleased | Feb 23, 2017 | Feb 23, 2017 | | |
| TT Isle of Man: Ride on the Edge | Racing | Kylotonn | Bigben Interactive | Mar 6, 2018 | Mar 6, 2018 | Mar 6, 2018 | | |
| TT Isle of Man: Ride on the Edge 2 | Racing | Kylotonn | Bigben Interactive | Mar 19, 2020 | Mar 19, 2020 | Mar 19, 2020 | X | |
| Tumblestone | Puzzle | The Quantum Astrophysicists Guild | The Quantum Astrophysicists Guild | Jul 16, 2016 | Jul 16, 2016 | Jul 16, 2016 | | |
| Tunche | Beat 'em up | Leap Game Studios | HypeTrain Digital | Unreleased | TBA | TBA | | |
| The Turing Test | Puzzle, Adventure | Bulkhead Interactive | Square Enix Collective | Aug 30, 2016 | Aug 30, 2016 | Aug 30, 2016 | | |
| Turnip Boy Commits Tax Evastion | Adventure | Snoozy Kazoo | Graffiti Games | Apr 18, 2022 | Apr 19, 2022 | Apr 18, 2022 | | |
| TurnOn | Platformer | Brainy Studio | Brainy Studio | Jun 1, 2016 | Jun 1, 2016 | Jun 1, 2016 | | |
| Turok: Dinosaur Hunter | First-person shooter | Night Dive Studios | Night Dive Studios | Unreleased | Mar 2, 2018 | Mar 2, 2018 | | |
| Turok 2: Seeds of Evil | First-person shooter | Night Dive Studios | Night Dive Studios | Unreleased | Mar 2, 2018 | Mar 2, 2018 | | |
| Twelve Minutes | Adventure | Luis Antonio | Annapurna Interactive | Aug 19, 2021 | Aug 19, 2021 | Aug 19, 2021 | | |
| TwinCop | Co-op twin-stick shooter | Finite Reflection Studios | Finite Reflection Studios | Unreleased | Oct 11, 2019 | Oct 11, 2019 | | |
| Twin Mirror | Adventure | Dontnod Entertainment | Dontnod Entertainment | Unreleased | Dec 1, 2020 | Dec 1, 2020 | | |
| Twin Robots: Ultimate Edition | Platformer | Thinice Games | Ratalaika Games | Aug 29, 2018 | Aug 29, 2018 | Aug 29, 2018 | | |
| Two Parsecs From Earth | Action, metroidvania | ABX Games Studios | Ratalaika Games | Unreleased | Oct 15, 2020 | Oct 15, 2020 | | |
| Two Point Campus | Business simulation | Two Point Studios | Sega | Aug 9, 2022 | Aug 9, 2022 | Aug 9, 2022 | | |
| Two Point Hospital | Business simulation | Two Point Studios | Sega | Unreleased | Feb 25, 2020 | Feb 24, 2020 | X | |
| Tyd Wag vir Niemand | First-person platform puzzler | Skobbejak Games | Skobbejak Games | Unreleased | Mar 22, 2019 | Mar 22, 2019 | PA | |
| Typoman | Puzzle; platformer | Brainseed Factory | Brainseed Factory | Unreleased | Feb 17, 2017 | Feb 17, 2017 | | |
| UglyDolls: An Imperfect Adventure | Kids & Family | Well Played Games | Outright Games | Unreleased | Apr 26, 2019 | Apr 26, 2019 | | |
| Ultimate Chicken Horse | Platformer | Clever Endeavour Games | Clever Endeavour Games | Unreleased | Dec 14, 2017 | Dec 14, 2017 | | |
| Ultimate Racing 2D | Racing | Applimazing | Applimazing | Dec 11, 2019 | Dec 11, 2019 | Dec 11, 2019 | | |
| Ultratron | Platformer | Carbon | Curve Digital | Unreleased | May 8, 2015 | May 8, 2015 | | |
| Umurangi Generation: Special Edition | Photography | Origame Digital | Origame Digital, Playism | May 17, 2022 | May 17, 2022 | May 17, 2022 | | |
| Unbox: Newbie's Adventure | Platformer | Prospect Games | Merge Games | Jul 26, 2017 | Jul 26, 2017 | Jul 26, 2017 | | |
| Uncanny Valley | Horror adventure | SPL | Digerati | Feb 10, 2017 | Feb 10, 2017 | Feb 10, 2017 | | |
| Uncharted Tides: Port Royal | Hidden object adventure | Cordelia Games | Artifex Mundi | Feb 20, 2020 | Feb 21, 2020 | Feb 20, 2020 | X | |
| Undead Horde | Action role-playing | 10tons | 10tons | May 15, 2019 | May 15, 2019 | May 15, 2019 | X | |
| Underhero | Platformer; role-playing | Paper Castle Games, Stage Clear Studios | Digerati | Feb 14, 2020 | Feb 14, 2020 | Feb 14, 2020 | | |
| Undernauts: Labyrinth of Yomi | Role-playing | Experience | JP: Experience; WW: Aksys Games | Jun 12, 2020 | Oct 28, 2021 | Oct 28, 2021 | | |
| Undertale | Role-playing | Tobyfox | 8-4 | Mar 16, 2021 | Mar 16, 2021 | Mar 16, 2021 | | |
| Underworld Ascendant | Action role-playing | Otherside Entertainment | 505 Games | Unreleased | Jun 26, 2019 | Jun 26, 2019 | | |
| Unepic | Platformer; role-playing | Francisco Tellez de Meneses | EnjoyUp Games | Jan 8, 2016 | Jan 8, 2016 | Jan 8, 2016 | | |
| Unexplored | Roguelite action-role-playing | Nephilim Game Studios; Ludomotion | Digerati | Unreleased | Feb 22, 2019 | Feb 22, 2019 | | |
| Unexplored 2: The Wayfarer's Legacy | Roguelite action-role-playing | Ludomotion | Ludomotion | Unreleased | Jun 3, 2022 | Jun 3, 2022 | | |
| Unit 4 | Platformer | Gamera Interactive | Gamera Interactive | May 23, 2017 | May 23, 2017 | May 23, 2017 | | |
| Unknown 9: Awakening | Action-adventure | Reflector Entertainment | Bandai Namco Entertainment | Oct 18, 2024 | Oct 18, 2024 | Oct 18, 2024 | | |
| Unknown Fate | 1st-person adventure | MarsLit Games | MarsLit Games | Apr 23, 2019 | Apr 24, 2019 | Apr 23, 2019 | | |
| Unmechanical: Extended | Puzzle-platformer | Talawa Games; Teotl Studios | Grip Games | Jan 30, 2015 | Jan 30, 2015 | Jan 30, 2015 | | |
| Unnamed Fiasco | Action-adventure; platformer | Unnamed Fiasco Team | Unnamed Fiasco Team | Aug 17, 2016 | Aug 17, 2016 | Aug 17, 2016 | | |
| Uno | Card & Board | Ubisoft Chengdu | Ubisoft | Aug 16, 2016 | Aug 16, 2016 | Aug 16, 2016 | | |
| Unpacking | Puzzle | Witch Beam | Humble Games | Nov 2, 2021 | Nov 2, 2021 | Nov 2, 2021 | | |
| Unrailed! | Party | Indoor Astronaut | Daedalic Entertainment | Oct 27, 2020 | Oct 27, 2020 | Oct 27, 2020 | | |
| Unravel | Puzzle platformer | Coldwood Interactive | Electronic Arts | Feb 9, 2016 | Feb 9, 2016 | Feb 9, 2016 | | |
| Unravel Two | Puzzle platformer | Coldwood Interactive | Electronic Arts | Jun 9, 2018 | Jun 9, 2018 | Jun 9, 2018 | | |
| Unruly Heroes | Platformer | Magic Design Studios | Magic Design Studios | Jan 23, 2019 | Jan 23, 2019 | Jan 23, 2019 | X | |
| Unspottable | Party | GrosChevaux | GrosChevaux | Jan 21, 2021 | Jan 21, 2021 | Jan 21, 2021 | | |
| Untitled Goose Game | Action-adventure, stealth | House House | Panic | Dec 17, 2019 | Dec 17, 2019 | Dec 17, 2019 | X | |
| Unto The End | Action-adventure | 2 Ton Studios | Big Sugar | Dec 9, 2020 | Dec 9, 2020 | Dec 9, 2020 | | |
| Use Your Words | Party | Smiling Buddha Games | Screenwave Media | Apr 4, 2017 | Apr 4, 2017 | Apr 4, 2017 | | |
| V-Rally 4 | Racing | Kylotonn | Bigben Interactive | Unreleased | Sep 11, 2018 | Sep 7, 2018 | X | |
| Vaccine | Action & Adventure | RNC | RNC | Feb 20, 2017 | Feb 20, 2017 | Feb 20, 2017 | | |
| Valentino Rossi: The Game | Racing | Milestone srl | Milestone srl | Jul 26, 2016 | Jul 26, 2016 | Jul 26, 2016 | | |
| Valfaris | Action, platformer | Steel Mantis | Digital Uppercut | Unreleased | Nov 8, 2019 | Nov 8, 2019 | | |
| Valhalla Hills: Definitive Edition | Strategy | Daedalic Entertainment | Kalypso | Apr 28, 2017 | Apr 28, 2017 | Apr 28, 2017 | | |
| Valiant Hearts: The Great War | Puzzle; adventure | Ubisoft Montpellier | Ubisoft | Jun 25, 2014 | Jun 25, 2014 | Jun 25, 2014 | | |
| Valkyria Chronicles 4 | Tactical role-playing | Sega | Sega | Sep 27, 2018 | Sep 25, 2018 | Sep 25, 2018 | | |
| Valkyria Revolution | Strategy role-playing | Sega | Sega | Jan 19, 2017 | Jun 27, 2017 | Jun 30, 2017 | | |
| Valley | Adventure | Blue Isle Studios | Blue Isle Studios | Unreleased | Aug 24, 2016 | Aug 24, 2016 | | |
| Vambrace: Cold Soul | Role-playing | Devespresso Games | Headup Games | Aug 27, 2019 | Aug 28, 2019 | Aug 28, 2019 | | |
| Vampire: The Masquerade – Bloodlines 2 | Action role-playing | Hardsuit Labs | Paradox Interactive | TBA | TBA | TBA | | |
| Vampire: The Masquerade – Coteries of New York | Visual novel | Draw Distance | Draw Distance | Unreleased | Apr 15, 2020 | Apr 15, 2020 | | |
| Vampyr | Action role-playing | Dontnod Entertainment | Focus Home Interactive | Jun 5, 2018 | Jun 5, 2018 | Jun 5, 2018 | | |
| The Incredible Adventures of Van Helsing | Action role-playing | NeocoreGames | NeocoreGames | Dec 1, 2015 | Dec 1, 2015 | Dec 1, 2015 | | |
| The Incredible Adventures of Van Helsing II | Action role-playing | NeocoreGames | NeocoreGames | Unreleased | Oct 18, 2016 | Oct 18, 2016 | | |
| The Incredible Adventures of Van Helsing III | Action role-playing | NeocoreGames | NeocoreGames | Dec 29, 2017 | Dec 29, 2017 | Dec 29, 2017 | X | |
| The Vanishing of Ethan Carter | Adventure, Puzzle | The Astronauts | The Astronauts | Unreleased | Jan 19, 2018 | Jan 19, 2018 | X | |
| Vanquish | Action, third-person shooter | PlatinumGames | Sega | Unreleased | Feb 18, 2020 | Feb 18, 2020 | X | |
| Vaporum | Role-playing | Fatbot Games | Merge Games | Apr 10, 2019 | Apr 10, 2019 | Apr 10, 2019 | | |
| Varenje | Hidden object adventure | Play Cute | Joybits | Aug 2, 2019 | Aug 2, 2019 | Aug 2, 2019 | PA | |
| Vasara HD Collection | Shoot 'em up | QuByte Interactive | QuByte Interactive | Nov 24, 2019 | Aug 14, 2019 | Aug 14, 2019 | | |
| Vasilis | Adventure | Marginal Act | Sometimes You | Feb 26, 2020 | Feb 26, 2020 | Feb 26, 2020 | X | |
| Velocity 2X | Action & Adventure, Platformer, Shooter | FuturLab | Sierra Entertainment | Unreleased | Aug 19, 2015 | Aug 19, 2015 | | |
| Velocity G | Racing | Andrew Jeffreys | Repixel8 | Apr 12, 2019 | Apr 12, 2019 | Apr 12, 2019 | X | |
| Vera Blanc: Full Moon | Visual novel | Winter Wolves | Ratalaika Games | Nov 11, 2020 | Nov 11, 2020 | Nov 11, 2020 | | |
| Verdun | Shooter | M2H Game Studio | Blackmill Games | Mar 8, 2017 | Mar 8, 2017 | Mar 8, 2017 | | |
| Verlet Swing | Action | Flamebait Games, Stage Clear Studios | Digerati | Unreleased | Jun 14, 2019 | Jun 14, 2019 | X | |
| Vertical Drop Heroes HD | Role-playing | SPL | Digerati | Unreleased | Feb 17, 2017 | Feb 17, 2017 | | |
| Vesta | Adventure, Puzzle | FinalBoss Games | FinalBoss Games | Unreleased | Jan 19, 2018 | Jan 19, 2018 | | |
| Vicious Attack Llama Apocalypse | Shooter | RogueCode | RogueCode | Mar 16, 2018 | Mar 16, 2018 | Mar 16, 2018 | PA | |
| Victor Vran | Action role-playing | Haemimont Games | Haemimont Games | May 29, 2017 | May 29, 2017 | May 29, 2017 | | |
| Videoball | Sports | Action Button | Iron Galaxy Studios | Jul 12, 2016 | Jul 12, 2016 | Jul 12, 2016 | | |
| The VideoKid | Action, Retro | VideoKid Games | Chorus Worldwide | Aug 30, 2018 | Aug 31, 2018 | Aug 31, 2018 | PA | |
| Vigor | Survival | Bohemia Interactive | Bohemia Interactive | Unreleased | Aug 19, 2019 | Aug 19, 2019 | | |
| Vikings: Wolves of Midgard | Action role-playing | Games Farm | Kalypso Media | Mar 28, 2017 | Mar 28, 2017 | Mar 28, 2017 | | |
| Virginia | Adventure | Variable State | 505 Games | Sep 22, 2016 | Sep 22, 2016 | Sep 22, 2016 | | |
| Visage | Survival Horror | SadSquare Studio | SadSquare Studio | Oct 30, 2020 | Oct 30, 2020 | Oct 30, 2020 | | |
| The Voice | Music | Voxler | Bigben Interactive | Unreleased | Unreleased | Nov 25, 2016 | | |
| Void Bastards | Roguelike first person shooter | Blue Munchu | Humble Bundle | May 29, 2019 | May 29, 2019 | May 29, 2019 | | |
| Void Vikings | Shoot 'em up | Ugly Beard Games | Ugly Beard Games | Unreleased | Jan 11, 2019 | Jan 11, 2019 | | |
| Volgarr the Viking | 2D Platform | Crazy Viking Studios | Crazy Viking Studios | Dec 5, 2014 | Oct 31, 2014 | Oct 31, 2014 | | |
| Volgarr the Viking II | 2D Platform | Crazy Viking Studios | Digital Eclipse | Aug 6, 2024 | Aug 6, 2024 | Aug 6, 2024 | | |
| Voodoo Vince | Platformer | Beep Games | Beep Games | Apr 18, 2017 | Apr 18, 2017 | Apr 18, 2017 | PA | |
| Vosaria: Lair of the Forgotten | Action-platformer | Johnny Ostad | Johnny Ostad | Mar 22, 2019 | Mar 22, 2019 | Mar 22, 2019 | | |
| Vostok Inc | Simulation | Nosebleed Interactive | BadLand Publishing | Aug 1, 2017 | Aug 1, 2017 | Aug 1, 2017 | | |
| Wailing Heights | Adventure | Outsider Games | Outsider Games | Aug 15, 2018 | Aug 15, 2018 | Aug 15, 2018 | | |
| Walk in the Dark | Platform | Flying Turtle Software | Flying Turtle Software | Unreleased | May 19, 2017 | May 19, 2017 | PA | |
| Walk The Light | Puzzle | AntiCrunch Studios | AntiCrunch Studios | Sep 7, 2017 | Sep 7, 2017 | Sep 7, 2017 | | |
| The Walking Dead: Michonne | Graphic adventure | Telltale Games | Telltale Games | Unreleased | Feb 23, 2016 | Feb 23, 2016 | | |
| The Walking Dead: Season One | Graphic adventure | Telltale Games | Telltale Games | Unreleased | Oct 14, 2014 | Oct 24, 2014 | | |
| The Walking Dead: Season Two | Graphic adventure | Telltale Games | Telltale Games | Unreleased | Oct 21, 2014 | Oct 24, 2014 | | |
| The Walking Dead: A New Frontier | Graphic adventure | Telltale Games | Telltale Games | Unreleased | Dec 20, 2016 | Dec 20, 2016 | | |
| The Walking Dead: The Final Season | Graphic adventure | Telltale Games | Telltale Games | Unreleased | Aug 14, 2018 | Aug 14, 2018 | | |
| The Walking Vegetables: Radical Edition | Roguelite shooter | Still Running | Merge Games | Unreleased | Jan 23, 2019 | Jan 23, 2019 | | |
| Wand Wars | Action & Adventure | Moonradish | Moonradish | Unreleased | Dec 5, 2016 | Dec 5, 2016 | | |
| Wandersong | Adventure | Greg Lobanov | Humble Bundle | Unreleased | Dec 6, 2019 | Dec 6, 2019 | | |
| War Tech Fighters | Space shooter, Mechs | Drakkar Dev | Blowfish Studios | Unreleased | Jun 27, 2019 | Jun 26, 2019 | X | |
| Wargroove | Strategy, Turn-based | Chucklefish | Chucklefish | Unreleased | Feb 1, 2019 | Feb 1, 2019 | PA | |
| Warhammer 40,000: Battlesector | Turn-based tactics | Black Lab Games | Slitherine Software | Unreleased | Dec 2, 2021 | Dec 2, 2021 | | |
| Warhammer 40,000: Inquisitor – Martyr | Action role-playing | NeocoreGames | NeocoreGames | Jun 5, 2018 | Jun 5, 2018 | Jun 5, 2018 | | |
| Warhammer 40,000: Mechanicus | Turn-based tactics | Bulwark Studios | Kasedo Games | Unreleased | Jul 17, 2020 | Jul 17, 2020 | | |
| Warhammer Age of Sigmar: Storm Ground | Turn-based strategy | Gastket Games | Focus Home Interactive | Unreleased | May 27, 2021 | May 27, 2021 | | |
| Warhammer: End Times – Vermintide | First-person shooter, Action | Fatshark | Fatshark | Oct 4, 2016 | Oct 4, 2016 | Oct 4, 2016 | X | |
| Warhammer: Vermintide 2 | First-person shooter, Action | Fatshark | Fatshark | Jul 11, 2018 | Jul 11, 2018 | Jul 11, 2018 | | |
| Warhammer: Chaosbane | Action role-playing | Eko Games | Bigben Interactive | Unreleased | Jun 4, 2019 | Jun 4, 2019 | | |
| Warhammer Quest | Tactical role-playing | Rodeo Games/Twistplay | Chilled Mouse | Feb 23, 2017 | Feb 23, 2017 | Feb 23, 2017 | | |
| Warhammer Quest 2: The End Times | Tactical role-playing | Perchang | Chilled Mouse | Unreleased | Dec 20, 2019 | Dec 20, 2019 | | |
| Warlock's Tower | Puzzle | Midipixel | Ratalaika Games | May 29, 2019 | May 29, 2019 | May 29, 2019 | | |
| War Mongrels | Real-time tactics | Destructive Creations | All In! Games | TBA | TBA | TBA | | |
| Warparty | Real-time strategy | Warcave | Crazy Monkey Studios | Unreleased | Mar 28, 2019 | Mar 28, 2019 | | |
| Warriors Orochi 3 Ultimate | Hack and slash | Omega Force | Koei Tecmo | Sep 4, 2014 | Sep 2, 2014 | Sep 5, 2014 | | |
| Warriors Orochi 4 | Hack and slash | Omega Force | Koei Tecmo | Nov 27, 2018 | Nov 27, 2018 | Nov 27, 2018 | | |
| Wartile | Tactics, strategy | Playwood Project | Deck13 | Mar 24, 2020 | Mar 24, 2020 | Mar 24, 2020 | | |
| Wasteland 2: Game of the Year Edition | Role-playing | Obsidian Entertainment | inXile Entertainment | Oct 16, 2015 | Oct 13, 2015 | Oct 16, 2015 | | |
| Wasteland Remastered | Role-playing | inXile Entertainment | Xbox Game Studios | Feb 25, 2020 | Feb 25, 2020 | Feb 25, 2020 | PA | |
| Watch Dogs | Action-adventure; stealth; open world | Ubisoft Montreal | Ubisoft | Sep 4, 2014 | May 27, 2014 | May 27, 2014 | | |
| Watch Dogs 2 | Action-adventure; stealth; open world | Ubisoft Montreal | Ubisoft | Nov 15, 2016 | Nov 15, 2016 | Nov 15, 2016 | FPSB | |
| Watch Dogs: Legion | Action-adventure | Ubisoft Toronto | Ubisoft | Oct 29, 2020 | Oct 29, 2020 | Oct 29, 2020 | | |
| The Way | Adventure, Platform | Puzzling Dream | Code Horizon | Aug 4, 2017 | Aug 4, 2017 | Aug 4, 2017 | | |
| Way Out | Action-adventure | Hazelight Studios | Electronic Arts | Unreleased | Mar 23, 2018 | Mar 23, 2018 | | |
| Way of the Passive Fist | Action | Household Games | Household Games | Unreleased | Mar 7, 2018 | Mar 7, 2018 | | |
| Way to the Woods | Action-adventure | Studio Happy Bee | Team17 | Unreleased | TBA | TBA | | |
| We Were Here | Co-op puzzle adventure | Total Mayhem Games | Total Mayhem Games | Sep 16, 2019 | Sep 16, 2019 | Sep 16, 2019 | | |
| We Were Here Too | Co-op puzzle adventure | Total Mayhem Games | Total Mayhem Games | Oct 2, 2019 | Oct 2, 2019 | Oct 2, 2019 | | |
| We. The Revolution | Adventure | Klabater | Poluslash | Jun 25, 2019 | Jun 25, 2019 | Jun 25, 2019 | | |
| Wenjia | Platformer | Delimma Studio | E-Home Entertainment | Sep 21, 2018 | Sep 21, 2018 | Sep 21, 2018 | PA | |
| Western Press | Action | Paul Godson & Walk with Kings | Surprise Attack Games | Unreleased | Mar 23, 2018 | Mar 23, 2018 | | |
| We Are Doomed | Shooter | Vertex Pop | Vertex Pop | Apr 17, 2015 | Apr 17, 2015 | Apr 17, 2015 | | |
| We Are the Dwarves | Adventure | Whale Rock Games | Whale Rock Games | Feb 24, 2017 | Feb 24, 2017 | Feb 24, 2017 | | |
| We Happy Few | Roguelite Stealth/Survival | Compulsion Games | Gearbox Publishing | Aug 10, 2018 | Aug 10, 2018 | Aug 10, 2018 | PA X | |
| We Sing Pop | Song & Rhythm | We Sing Productions | THQ Nordic | Oct 24, 2017 | Oct 24, 2017 | Oct 24, 2017 | | |
| Welcome to Hanwell | Survival horror | Steel Arts Software | Steel Arts Software | Jul 19, 2019 | Jul 19, 2019 | Jul 19, 2019 | | |
| Wells | Run and Gun | Tower Up Studios | Tower Up Studios | Jan 30, 2017 | Jan 30, 2017 | Jan 30, 2017 | | |
| Westerado: Double Barreled | Action | Ostrich Banditos | Adult Swim Games | Dec 8, 2016 | Dec 8, 2016 | Dec 8, 2016 | | |
| What Lies in the Multiverse | Adventure | Studio Voyager; IguanaBee | Untold Tales | Unreleased | 2022 | 2022 | | |
| What Remains of Edith Finch | Adventure | Giant Sparrow | Annapurna Interactive | Jul 18, 2017 | Jul 18, 2017 | Jul 18, 2017 | | |
| What the Box? | Competitive shooter | Bitten Toast Games | Bitten Toast Games | Jul 4, 2018 | Jul 4, 2018 | Jul 4, 2018 | | |
| Wheel of Fortune | Card & Board | Frima Studios | Ubisoft | Nov 7, 2017 | Nov 7, 2017 | Nov 7, 2017 | | |
| Wheels of Aurelia | Racing, Adventure | MixedBag | MixedBag | Unreleased | Nov 18, 2016 | Nov 18, 2016 | | |
| Wheelspin Frenzy | Top Down Racing | Mental Moose Games | Mental Moose Games | Jul 6, 2018 | Jul 6, 2018 | Jul 6, 2018 | | |
| Where Are My Friends? | Platformer, Puzzle | Beard Games Studio | Sometimes You | Dec 7, 2018 | Mar 21, 2018 | Mar 21, 2018 | | |
| Where the Bees Make Honey | Puzzle | Wakefield Interactive | Whitethorn Digital | Unreleased | Mar 26, 2019 | Mar 26, 2019 | X | |
| Where the Water Tastes Like Wine | Adventure | Dim Bulb Games, Serenity Forge | Serenity Forge | Nov 29, 2019 | Nov 29, 2019 | Nov 29, 2019 | | |
| Whipseey and the Lost Atlas | Platformer | Daniel Ramirez | Blowfish Studios | Unreleased | Aug 28, 2019 | Aug 27, 2019 | | |
| Whispering Willows | Action & Adventure | Abstraction Games | Abstraction Games | Aug 28, 2015 | Aug 28, 2015 | Aug 28, 2015 | | |
| White Night | Puzzle, survival horror | Osome Studio | Osome Studio | Unreleased | Mar 6, 2015 | Mar 6, 2015 | | |
| White Noise 2 | Survival horror | Milkstone Studios | Milkstone Studios | Aug 31, 2017 | Aug 31, 2017 | Aug 31, 2017 | | |
| The Wild at Heart | Action-Adventure, Puzzle | Moonlight Kids | Humble Games | May 20, 2021 | May 20, 2021 | May 20, 2021 | | |
| Wick | Horror | Hellbent Games | Hellbent Games | Unreleased | Dec 20, 2016 | Dec 20, 2016 | | |
| Wildfire | Stealth | Sneaky Bastards | Humble Games | Unreleased | Dec 3, 2020 | Dec 3, 2020 | | |
| Windscape | Action-adventure | Magic Sandbox | Headup Games | Mar 27, 2019 | Mar 27, 2019 | Mar 27, 2019 | | |
| Winter's Dream | Visual novel | Ebi-Hime | Sometimes You | Oct 8, 2019 | Oct 8, 2019 | Oct 8, 2019 | X | |
| Winx Club: Alfea Butterflix Adventures | Adventure, Puzzle | Tsumanga Studios | Tsumanga Studios | Dec 28, 2017 | Dec 28, 2017 | Dec 28, 2017 | | |
| The Witcher 3: Wild Hunt | Action role-playing | CD Projekt Red | CD Projekt; Warner Bros. Interactive Entertainment | May 21, 2015 | May 19, 2015 | May 19, 2015 | X | |
| Without Escape | Adventure, Puzzle | Bumpty Trail Games | EastAsiaSoft | Jan 15, 2020 | Jan 15, 2020 | Jan 15, 2020 | | |
| The Witness | Adventure, puzzle | Thekla | Thekla | Sep 12, 2016 | Sep 12, 2016 | Sep 12, 2016 | | |
| Wizard of Legend | Action role-playing | Contingent99 | Humble Bundle | Unreleased | May 15, 2018 | May 15, 2018 | X | |
| Wizards of Brandel | Role-playing, JRPG | Exe Create | Kemco | Nov 6, 2019 | Nov 6, 2019 | Nov 6, 2019 | PA | |
| The Wolf Among Us | Graphic adventure | Telltale Games | Telltale Games | Unreleased | Nov 4, 2014 | Nov 7, 2014 | | |
| Wolfenstein: The New Order | First-person shooter | MachineGames | Bethesda Softworks | Sep 4, 2014 | May 20, 2014 | May 23, 2014 | | |
| Wolfenstein: The Old Blood | First-person shooter | MachineGames | Bethesda Softworks | May 28, 2015 | May 5, 2015 | May 15, 2015 | | |
| Wolfenstein: Youngblood | First-person shooter | MachineGames | Bethesda Softworks | Jul 26, 2019 | Jul 26, 2019 | Jul 26, 2019 | | |
| Wolfenstein II: The New Colossus | First-person shooter | MachineGames | Bethesda Softworks | Oct 27, 2017 | Oct 27, 2017 | Oct 27, 2017 | X | |
| Wonder Boy: The Dragon's Trap | Action & Adventure | Lizardcube | DotEmu | Apr 18, 2017 | Apr 18, 2017 | Apr 18, 2017 | | |
| Wondershot | Action & Adventure | Leikir Studio | Leikir Studio | Unreleased | Feb 19, 2016 | Feb 19, 2016 | | |
| Woodle Tree Adventures | Platformer | Fabio Ferrara | Chubby Pixel | May 8, 2019 | May 8, 2019 | May 8, 2019 | | |
| Woodle Tree Adventures 2 | Platformer | Fabio Ferrara | Chubby Pixel | Apr 17, 2020 | Apr 17, 2020 | Apr 17, 2020 | X | |
| Worbital | Party game, artillery | Team Jolly Roger | Advanced Interactive Games | Unreleased | Oct 18, 2019 | Oct 18, 2019 | X | |
| World Enduro Rally | Racing | GraphicDNA | GraphicDNA | Feb 1, 2019 | Feb 1, 2019 | Feb 1, 2019 | | |
| World II: Hunting Boss | Fighting | Guangzhou Good Games / Taiwan OXON Game Studio | E-Home Entertainment | Jul 15, 2016 | Jul 15, 2016 | Jul 15, 2016 | | |
| World of Final Fantasy Maxima | Role-playing | Tose; Square Enix | Square Enix | Nov 6, 2018 | Nov 6, 2018 | Nov 6, 2018 | X | |
| The World of Van Helsing: Deathtrap | Tower defense; Action role-playing | Neocore Games | Neocore Games | Jan 3, 2017 | Jan 3, 2017 | Jan 3, 2017 | | |
| World War Z | Co-op shooter | Saber Interactive | Mad Dog Games | Unreleased | Apr 16, 2019 | Apr 16, 2019 | X | |
| World War Z: Aftermath | First-person shooter | Saber Interactive | Saber Interactive | Unreleased | Sep 21, 2021 | Sep 21, 2021 | | |
| World to the West | Action & Adventure | Rain Games | Soedesco | May 5, 2017 | May 5, 2017 | May 5, 2017 | | |
| Worlds of Magic: Planar Conquest | Strategy | Teyon | Maximum Games | Mar 24, 2017 | Mar 24, 2017 | Mar 24, 2017 | | |
| Worms Battlegrounds | Artillery; turn-based strategy | Team17 | Team17 | Unreleased | Jun 3, 2014 | May 30, 2014 | | |
| Worms Rumble | Artillery; turn-based strategy | Team17 | Team17 | Jun 23, 2021 | Jun 23, 2021 | Jun 23, 2021 | | |
| Worms W.M.D | Artillery; turn-based strategy | Team17 | Team17 | Aug 23, 2016 | Aug 23, 2016 | Aug 23, 2016 | | |
| Worse Than Death | Horror | Benjamin Rivers | Benjamin Rivers | Unreleased | Oct 8, 2019 | Oct 8, 2019 | X | |
| Woven | Action-adventure | Alterego Games | Stickylock | Nov 15, 2019 | Nov 15, 2019 | Nov 15, 2019 | X | |
| WRC 5 | Racing, Rally | Kylotonn Games | Bigben Interactive | Oct 16, 2015 | Oct 16, 2015 | Oct 16, 2015 | | |
| WRC 6 | Racing, Rally | Kylotonn Games | Bigben Interactive | Oct 7, 2016 | Oct 7, 2016 | Oct 7, 2016 | | |
| WRC 7 | Racing, Rally | Kylotonn Games | Bigben Interactive | Oct 3, 2017 | Oct 3, 2017 | Oct 3, 2017 | X | |
| WRC 8 | Racing, Rally | Kylotonn Games | Bigben Interactive | Unreleased | Sep 10, 2019 | Sep 5, 2019 | | |
| WRC 9 | Racing, Rally | Kylotonn Games | Bigben Interactive | Unreleased | Sep 3, 2020 | Sep 3, 2020 | | |
| WRC 10 | Racing, Rally | Kylotonn Games | Nacon | Unreleased | Sep 2, 2021 | Sep 2, 2021 | | |
| Wreckfest | Vehicular combat | Bugbear Entertainment | THQ Nordic | Unreleased | Aug 27, 2019 | Aug 27, 2019 | | |
| Wulverblade | Brawler, sidescroller | Darkwind Media | Darkwind Media | Feb 1, 2018 | Feb 1, 2018 | Feb 1, 2018 | | |
| Wuppo | Action-Adventure, Platformer | Knuist & Perzik | Soedesco | Nov 10, 2017 | Nov 10, 2017 | Nov 10, 2017 | | |
| WWE 2K15 | Sports | Yuke's/Visual Concepts | 2K Sports | Unreleased | Nov 18, 2014 | Nov 21, 2014 | | |
| WWE 2K16 | Sports | Yuke's/Visual Concepts | 2K Sports | Unreleased | Oct 27, 2015 | Oct 30, 2015 | | |
| WWE 2K17 | Sports | Yuke's/Visual Concepts | 2K Sports | Mar 22, 2017 | Oct 11, 2016 | Oct 11, 2016 | | |
| WWE 2K18 | Sports | Yuke's/Visual Concepts | 2K Sports | Oct 17, 2017 | Oct 17, 2017 | Oct 17, 2017 | | |
| WWE 2K19 | Sports | Yuke's/Visual Concepts | 2K Sports | Oct 9, 2018 | Oct 9, 2018 | Oct 9, 2018 | X | |
| WWE 2K20 | Sports | Visual Concepts | 2K Sports | Oct 22, 2019 | Oct 22, 2019 | Oct 22, 2019 | | |
| WWE 2K22 | Sports | Visual Concepts | 2K Sports | Mar 11, 2022 | Mar 11, 2022 | Mar 11, 2022 | | |
| WWE 2K23 | Sports | Visual Concepts | 2K Sports | Mar 14, 2023 | Mar 14, 2023 | Mar 14, 2023 | | |
| WWE 2K24 | Sports | Visual Concepts | 2K Sports | Mar 8, 2024 | Mar 8, 2024 | Mar 8, 2024 | | |
| WWE 2K25 | Sports | Visual Concepts | 2K Sports | Mar 14, 2025 | Mar 14, 2025 | Mar 14, 2025 | | |
| WWE 2K Battlegrounds | Sports | Saber Interactive | 2K Sports | Unreleased | Sep 18, 2020 | Sep 18, 2020 | | |
| X-Morph: Defense | Twin-stick shooter; tower defense | Exor Studios | Exor Studios | Aug 30, 2017 | Aug 30, 2017 | Aug 30, 2017 | | |
| Xcom 2 | Strategy & Simulation | Firaxis Games | 2K Games | Sep 6, 2016 | Sep 6, 2016 | Sep 6, 2016 | | |
| Xeno Crisis | Top-down shooter | Bitmap Bureau | Bitmap Bureau | Oct 30, 2019 | Oct 30, 2019 | Oct 30, 2019 | | |
| Xenon Racer | Racing | 3D Clouds | Soedesco | Mar 26, 2019 | Mar 26, 2019 | Mar 26, 2019 | | |
| Xenon Valkyrie+ | Platformer; role-playing | Diabolical Mind; CowCat | CowCat | Feb 20, 2018 | Feb 20, 2018 | Feb 20, 2018 | | |
| Xenoraid | Shoot 'em up | 10tons | 10tons | Nov 7, 2016 | Nov 7, 2016 | Nov 7, 2016 | | |
| Xenoraptor | Twin stick shooter | Peter Cleary, Stage Clear Studios | Digerati | Dec 24, 2019 | Dec 24, 2019 | Dec 24, 2019 | | |
| XIII | First-person shooter, stealth | PlayMagic | Microïds | Unreleased | Nov 10, 2020 | Nov 10, 2020 | | |
| Xuan-Yuan Sword: The Gate of Firmament | Role-playing | Softstar Entertainment | E-Home Entertainment | Jan 24, 2018 | Jan 24, 2018 | Jan 24, 2018 | | |
| Yaga | Action role-playing | Breadcrumbs Interactive | Versus Evil | Nov 12, 2019 | Nov 12, 2019 | Nov 12, 2019 | X | |
| Yakuza 0 | Action-adventure | Sega | Sega | Feb 26, 2020 | Feb 26, 2020 | Feb 26, 2020 | | |
| Yakuza 6: The Song of Life | Action-adventure | Sega | Sega | Mar 25, 2021 | Mar 25, 2021 | Mar 25, 2021 | X | |
| Yakuza Kiwami | Action-adventure | Sega | Sega | Apr 21, 2020 | Apr 21, 2020 | Apr 21, 2020 | | |
| Yakuza Kiwami 2 | Action-adventure | Sega | Sega | Jul 30, 2020 | Jul 30, 2020 | Jul 30, 2020 | X | |
| Yakuza: Like a Dragon | Role-playing | Ryu Ga Gotoku Studio | Sega | Feb 25, 2021 | Nov 10, 2020 | Nov 10, 2020 | X | |
| The Yakuza Remastered Collection | Action-adventure | Sega | Sega | Jan 28, 2021 | Jan 28, 2021 | Jan 28, 2021 | | |
| Yasai Ninja | Action & Adventure | Reco Technology | Reco Technology | Unreleased | Aug 26, 2015 | Aug 26, 2015 | | |
| Yes, Your Grace | Role-playing | Brave at Night | No More Robots | Jun 26, 2020 | Jun 26, 2020 | Jun 26, 2020 | | |
| Yesterday Origins | Adventure | Pendulo Studios | Microids | Sep 29, 2016 | Sep 29, 2016 | Sep 29, 2016 | | |
| YesterMorrow | Puzzle-platform | Bitmap Galaxy | Blowfish Studios | Unreleased | Nov 5, 2020 | Nov 5, 2020 | | |
| Yet Another Zombie Defense HD | Top-down shooter | Awesome Games Studio | Awesome Games Studio | Unreleased | Jun 22, 2018 | Jun 22, 2018 | X | |
| Yoku's Island Express | Platformer, pinball, adventure | Villa Gorilla | Team17 | May 29, 2018 | May 29, 2018 | May 29, 2018 | PA | |
| Yonder: The Cloud Catcher Chronicles | Adventure | Prideful Sloth | Merge Games | Feb 27, 2019 | Feb 27, 2019 | Feb 27, 2019 | PA X | |
| Yooka-Laylee | 3D Platformer | Playtonic Games | Team17 | Apr 11, 2017 | Apr 11, 2017 | Apr 11, 2017 | | |
| Yooka-Laylee and the Impossible Lair | 3D Platformer | Playtonic Games | Team17 | Oct 8, 2019 | Oct 8, 2019 | Oct 8, 2019 | | |
| You Suck at Parking | Arcade Racing | Happy Volcano | Curve Games | Sep 14, 2022 | Sep 14, 2022 | Sep 14, 2022 | | |
| Your Toy | Adventure, Puzzle | Viva Games | E-Home Entertainment | Nov 17, 2017 | Nov 17, 2017 | Nov 17, 2017 | | |
| Youtubers Life OMG! Edition | Life simulation, Strategy | UPlay Online | UPlay Online | Unreleased | Nov 21, 2018 | Nov 21, 2018 | | |
| Ys Origin | Action role-playing | DotEmu | DotEmu | Apr 11, 2018 | Apr 11, 2018 | Apr 11, 2018 | | |
| Yu-Gi-Oh! Legacy of the Duelist | Card & Board | Other Ocean Interactive | Konami | Unreleased | Jul 30, 2015 | Jul 30, 2015 | | |
| Yu-Gi-Oh! Legacy of the Duelist: Link Evolution | Card battle | Konami | Konami | Mar 24, 2020 | Mar 24, 2020 | Mar 24, 2020 | | |
| Yu-Gi-Oh! Master Duel | Card battle | Konami | Konami | TBA | TBA | TBA | | |
| Yuoni | Survival horror | Tricore | Chorus Worldwide | Aug 19, 2021 | Aug 19, 2021 | Aug 19, 2021 | | |
| The Z Axis: Continuum | Puzzle Platformer | Lazerpants Games | Lazerpants Games | Jul 30, 2018 | Jul 30, 2018 | Jul 31, 2018 | | |
| Zamb! Redux | Twin-stick shooter, tower defense | Nano Games | Nano Games | Unreleased | May 30, 2018 | May 30, 2018 | | |
| Zazen, zen meditation game | Exergaming | Nangok Software | Nangok Software | Jun 6, 2017 | Jun 6, 2017 | Jun 6, 2017 | | |
| Zengeon | Action role-playing | IndieLeague Studio | PQube | Unreleased | TBA | TBA | | |
| Zenith | Role-playing | Infinigon | BadLand Games | Sep 29, 2016 | Sep 29, 2016 | Sep 29, 2016 | | |
| Zeroptian Invasion | Shoot 'em up, Arcade | Josyanf1 | Ratalaika Games | Apr 24, 2019 | Apr 24, 2019 | Apr 24, 2019 | | |
| Zheros | Action & Adventure | Rimlight Studios | Rimlight Studios | Jan 15, 2016 | Jan 15, 2016 | Jan 15, 2016 | | |
| Ziggurat | First-person shooter; dungeon crawl | Milkstone Studios | Milkstone Studios | Unreleased | Apr 21, 2015 | Apr 22, 2015 | | |
| Zombi | Action & Adventure | Ubisoft Montpellier | Ubisoft | Aug 19, 2015 | Aug 18, 2015 | Jan 22, 2016 | | |
| Zombie Army 4: Dead War | Co-op shooter | Rebellion Developments | Rebellion Developments | Feb 4, 2020 | Feb 4, 2020 | Feb 4, 2020 | | |
| Zombie Army Trilogy | Tactical shooter, Stealth | Rebellion Developments | Rebellion Developments | Mar 6, 2015 | Mar 6, 2015 | Mar 6, 2015 | | |
| Zombie Driver: Ultimate Edition | Action-adventure, Racing | Exor Studios | Exor Studios | Unreleased | Jun 24, 2014 | Jul 1, 2014 | | |
| Zombie Party | Action-adventure | Peach Pie Productions | Black Shell Media | Oct 6, 2017 | Oct 6, 2017 | Oct 6, 2017 | | |
| Zombie Pinball | Pinball | Shine Research | Plug In Digital | Unreleased | May 9, 2018 | May 9, 2018 | | |
| Zombie Vikings | Brawler | Zoink | Zoink | Unreleased | Feb 22, 2018 | Feb 22, 2018 | | |
| Zombieland: Double Tap - Road Trip | Twin-stick shooter | High Voltage Software | GameMill Entertainment | Unreleased | Oct 15, 2019 | Oct 14, 2019 | | |
| Zombies Ate My Neighbors | Run and gun | Dotemu | Lucasfilm Games | Unreleased | Jun 29, 2021 | Jun 29, 2021 | | |
| Zoo Tycoon | Business simulation | Frontier Developments | Xbox Game Studios | Sep 4, 2014 | Nov 22, 2013 | Nov 22, 2013 | | |
| Zoo Tycoon: Ultimate Animal Collection | Business simulation | Asobo Studio | Xbox Game Studios | Oct 31, 2017 | Oct 31, 2017 | Oct 31, 2017 | PA X K | |
| Zumba Fitness: World Party | Exergaming | Zoë Mode | Majesco | Sep 4, 2014 | Nov 22, 2013 | Dec 6, 2013 | K | |

== Free-to-play ==
| Title | Genre(s) | Developer(s) | Publisher(s) | Release date | | | Addons | Ref. |
| Title | Genre(s) | Developer(s) | Publisher(s) | JP | EU | NA | Addons | Ref. |
|---|---|---|---|---|---|---|---|---|
| Magic Duels | Collectible card game | Stainless Games | Wizards of the Coast | Jul 29, 2015 | Jul 29, 2015 | Jul 29, 2015 | | |
| Minion Masters: Forced to Duel | Battle arena | BetaDwarf | BetaDwarf | Unreleased | May 24, 2019 | May 24, 2019 | X | |
| My Hero Academia: Ultra Rumble | Battle royale | Bandai Namco | Bandai Namco | TBA | TBA | TBA | | |
| NBA 2K17: The Prelude | Sports | Visual Concepts | 2K Sports | Sep 8, 2016 | Sep 8, 2016 | Sep 8, 2016 | | |
| NBA 2K18: The Prelude | Sports | Visual Concepts | 2K Sports | Sep 8, 2017 | Sep 8, 2017 | Sep 8, 2017 | | |
| NBA 2K19: The Prelude | Sports | Visual Concepts | 2K Sports | Aug 31, 2018 | Aug 31, 2018 | Aug 31, 2018 | X | |
| Neverwinter | Massively multiplayer online role-playing | Cryptic Studios | Perfect World Entertainment | Sep 29, 2014 | Mar 31, 2015 | Mar 31, 2015 | | |
| Onigiri | Action role-playing | CyberStep | CyberStep | Nov 27, 2014 | Apr 13, 2017 | Oct 2, 2015 | | |
| Paladins | First-person shooter | Hi-Rez Studios | Hi-Rez Studios | May 8, 2018 | May 8, 2018 | May 8, 2018 | | |
| Path of Exile | Action role-playing | Grinding Gear Games | Grinding Gear Games | Aug 24, 2017 | Aug 24, 2017 | Aug 24, 2017 | | |
| Phantasy Star Online 2 | Massively multiplayer online role-playing | Sega | Sega | Unreleased | Aug 6, 2020 | Apr 14, 2020 | X | |
| Phantom Dust | Arena shooter, deck building | Code Mystics | Xbox Game Studios | May 16, 2017 | May 16, 2017 | May 16, 2017 | PA PC | |
| The Pinball Arcade | Pinball | FarSight Studios | FarSight Studios | Nov 26, 2014 | Nov 26, 2014 | Nov 26, 2014 | | |
| Pinball FX 2 | Pinball | Zen Studios | Zen Studios | Aug 28, 2014 | Aug 28, 2014 | Aug 28, 2014 | | |
| Pinball FX 3 | Pinball | Zen Studios | Zen Studios | Sep 26, 2017 | Sep 26, 2017 | Sep 26, 2017 | PA PC | |
| Prominence Poker | Card & board | Pipeworks Studio | 505 Games | Aug 16, 2016 | Aug 16, 2016 | Aug 16, 2016 | | |
| Realm Royale | Battle royale | Hi-Rez Studios | Hi-Rez Studios | Unreleased | Jan 22, 2019 | Jan 22, 2019 | X | |
| Roblox | Crafting, game creator | Roblox | Roblox | Unreleased | Jun 29, 2016 | Jan 27, 2016 | PC | |
| Rogue Company | Third-person shooter | Hi-Rez Studios | Hi-Rez Studios | Unreleased | Oct 1, 2020 | Oct 1, 2020 | | |
| Roller Champions | Sports | Ubisoft Montreal | Ubisoft | Unreleased | 2021 | 2021 | | |
| Skyforge | Massively multiplayer online | Allods Team; Obsidian Entertainment | My.com | Nov 9, 2017 | Nov 9, 2017 | Nov 9, 2017 | | |
| Smite | Action, multiplayer online battle arena | Hi-Rez Studios | Hi-Rez Studios | Aug 19, 2015 | Aug 19, 2015 | Aug 19, 2015 | | |
| Space Jam: A New Legacy - The Game | Beat 'em Up | Digital Eclipse | Digital Eclipse | Jul 1, 2021 | Jul 1, 2021 | Jul 1, 2021 | | |
| Spacelords | Action-adventure | MercurySteam | MercurySteam | Sep 22, 2017 | Sep 22, 2017 | Sep 22, 2017 | PA PC X | |
| Star Trek Online | Massively multiplayer online | Cryptic Studios | Perfect World | Unreleased | Sep 7, 2016 | Sep 6, 2016 | | |
| Stern Pinball Arcade | Pinball | FarSight Studios | FarSight Studios | Unreleased | Mar 23, 2017 | Dec 2, 2016 | | |
| Super Bomberman R Online | Action; battle royale | Konami | Konami | May 27, 2021 | May 27, 2021 | May 27, 2021 | | |
| Tera | Massively multiplayer online role-playing | Bluehole | En Masse Entertainment | Apr 2, 2018 | Apr 2, 2018 | Apr 2, 2018 | | |
| Trove | Massively multiplayer online | Trion Worlds | Trion Worlds | Dec 12, 2016 | Dec 12, 2016 | Dec 12, 2016 | | |
| Virtual Villagers Origins 2 | Survival, Management | Last Day of Work | Gogii Games | Oct 9, 2019 | Oct 9, 2019 | Oct 9, 2019 | | |
| Voice Commander | Real-time strategy, top-down shooter | Microsoft Foundry | Xbox Game Studios | Unreleased | Unreleased | Oct 22, 2014 | | |
| War Thunder | Action, vehicular combat, combat flight simulator | Gaijin Entertainment | Gaijin Entertainment | Jun 19, 2018 | Jun 19, 2018 | Jun 19, 2018 | X | |
| Warface | Multiplayer first-person shooter | Mail.ru | My.com | Unreleased | Oct 9, 2018 | Oct 9, 2018 | | |
| Warframe | Third-person shooter, hack and slash | Digital Extremes | Digital Extremes | Sep 4, 2014 | Sep 2, 2014 | Sep 2, 2014 | | |
| World of Warships: Legends | Vehicular combat; Naval simulation | Wargaming | Wargaming | Unreleased | Apr 16, 2019 | Apr 16, 2019 | | |
| Zaccaria Pinball | Arcade, pinball | Magic Pixel | Magic Pixel | Apr 3, 2019 | Apr 3, 2019 | Apr 3, 2019 | | |

== See also ==
- List of best-selling Xbox One video games
- List of backward-compatible games for Xbox One and Series X/S
- List of Xbox One X enhanced games
- List of Xbox One and Series X/S applications
- List of Xbox Play Anywhere games
- List of Xbox Live games on Windows 10
