= 2016 in video games =

Numerous video games were released in 2016. New hardware came out as well, albeit largely refreshed and updated versions of consoles in the PlayStation 4 Pro, PlayStation 4 Slim, and Xbox One S. Commercially available virtual reality headsets were released in much greater numbers and at much lower price points than the enthusiast-only virtual reality headsets of earlier generations. Augmented reality also became mainstream with Pokémon Go. Top-rated games originally released in 2016 included Uncharted 4: A Thief's End, Inside, Overwatch, Forza Horizon 3, Madden NFL 17, WWE 2K17, NBA 2K17, Dark Souls III, and Battlefield 1 and Doom 2016. The top five highest-grossing video games of 2016 were League of Legends, Honor of Kings/Arena of Valor, Monster Strike, Clash Royale, and Dungeon Fighter Online.

Series with new installments in 2016 include Ace Attorney, Battlefield, Call of Duty, Civilization, Cossacks, Dark Souls, Dead Rising, Deus Ex, Dishonored, Digimon, Doom, Driveclub, Far Cry, FIFA, Final Fantasy, Fire Emblem, Forza Horizon, Gears of War, Hearts of Iron, Hitman, Homefront, Homeworld, Kirby, Mafia, Mario Party, Master of Orion, Metroid, Mirror's Edge, Paper Mario, Persona, Plants vs. Zombies: Garden Warfare, The Playroom, Pokémon, Ratchet & Clank, Shadow of the Beast, Shadow Warrior, Sonic the Hedgehog, Star Fox, Star Ocean, Street Fighter, Titanfall, Total War, Uncharted, Watch Dogs, XCOM, and Zero Escape.

In addition, 2016 saw the introduction of several new properties, including Abzû, Hyper Light Drifter, Inside, The Last Guardian, No Man's Sky, Owlboy, Obduction, Overwatch, Quantum Break, Stardew Valley, Tom Clancy's The Division, and The Witness.

== Financial performance ==
Analysis firm SuperData estimated that the global video game software market brought in $91 billion in revenues in 2016; this was an increase over the $74 billion estimated for 2015, but SuperData noted that their 2016 estimates included a larger data set. Of the $91 billion, $41 billion was attributed to mobile gaming, particularly the titles Clash Royale and Pokémon Go, with the largest mobile gaming section in Asia with total revenues near $25 billion. Personal computer video games made up $34 billion, with $19 billion contributed from free-to-play games, and console games, retail and downloadable, were $26 and $6.6 billion, respectively. The firm also identified that virtual reality (VR), professional video game sports, and streaming were still growing markets in the year. DFC Intelligence reported similar numbers for revenues in the various sectors, and noted that mobile gaming revenues overtook both console and personal computer revenues in 2016.

Newzoo estimated that $70.4 billion of video game revenues were made by the top 25 publicly-trading companies, led by Tencent ($10.2B), Sony ($7.9B), Activision Blizzard ($6.6B), Microsoft ($6.5B) and Apple, Inc. ($5.9B). The top ten companies brought in more than 54% of total revenues during 2016, up from 43% in 2015.

IHS Markit estimated that worldwide revenue related to console hardware, software, and services was $34.7 billion, down about 2.5% from 2015; hardware sales were down from $12.8 billion to $10.5 billion, while software and service revenues were up. Sony held about 57% of the market share during 2016, followed by Microsoft and Nintendo.

Within the United States, revenues from the video game industry in 2016 was estimated at $30.4 billion by the Entertainment Software Association and NPD Group, slightly up from 2015's $30.2 billion. Of that, $24.5 billion was spent on video game software, an increase of 6% from 2015. Digital purchases, which included full game purchases, downloadable content, game subscriptions, and mobile game microtransactions, made up 74% of this number, continuing a steady increase of digital sales over retail since 2010. Sales were driven by the introduction of VR, Pokémon Go and Pokémon Sun and Moon, and the games Battlefield 1, Call of Duty: Infinite Warfare, Madden NFL 17, NBA 2K17 and Tom Clancy's The Division.

=== Highest-grossing games ===
The following were 2016's top ten highest-grossing video games worldwide in terms of digital revenue (including digital purchases, microtransactions, free-to-play and pay-to-play) across all platforms (including Mobile, PC and console platforms). Six of the top ten highest-grossing games are published or owned by Tencent.

Rank	Game	Revenue	Publisher(s)	Genre	Platform	Ref.
1	League of Legends	$1,700,000,000	Riot Games / Tencent	MOBA	PC	
2	Honor of Kings / Arena of Valor	$1,610,000,000	Tencent	MOBA	Mobile	
3	Monster Strike	$1,300,000,000	Mixi	Physics	Mobile	
4	Clash of Clans	$1,200,000,000	Supercell (Tencent)	Strategy	Mobile	
5	Dungeon Fighter Online (DFO)	$1,100,000,000	Nexon / Tencent	Beat 'em up	PC	
6	Clash Royale	$1,100,000,000	Supercell (Tencent)	RTS	Mobile	
6	Crossfire	$1,100,000,000	Smilegate / Tencent	FPS	PC	
8	Puzzle & Dragons	$955,000,000	GungHo Online Entertainment	Puzzle	Mobile	
9	Pokémon Go	$950,000,000	Niantic / Nintendo / The Pokémon Company	AR	Mobile	
10	Game of War: Fire Age	$910,000,000	Machine Zone	Strategy	Mobile	

== Top-rated games ==
=== Critically acclaimed titles ===
Metacritic (MC) and GameRankings (GR) are aggregators of video game journalism reviews.

2016 games and expansions scoring at least 90/100 (MC) or 90% (GR)
Game	Publisher	Release Date	Platform	MC score	GR score
The Witcher 3: Wild Hunt – Blood and Wine	CD Projekt	May 31, 2016	XBO	94/100	94%
Persona 5	Atlus	September 15, 2016	PS4	93/100	93.3%
Inside	Playdead	June 29, 2016	XBO	93/100	92.81%
Uncharted 4: A Thief's End	Sony Interactive Entertainment	May 10, 2016	PS4	93/100	92.71%
Odin Sphere Leifthrasir	Atlus	January 14, 2016	PSV	93/100	89.25%
Forza Horizon 3	Microsoft Studios	September 27, 2016	XBO	91/100	92.14%
The Witcher 3: Wild Hunt – Blood and Wine	CD Projekt	May 31, 2016	WIN	92/100	91.58%
Out of the Park Baseball 17	Out of the Park Developments	March 22, 2016	WIN	92/100	91.25%
SteamWorld Heist	Image & Form	June 7, 2016	PSV	90/100	92%
Inside	Playdead	August 23, 2016	PS4	91/100	91.38%
Overwatch	Blizzard Entertainment	May 24, 2016	WIN	91/100	91.26%
Stephen's Sausage Roll	Increpare Games	April 18, 2016	WIN	90/100	91.25%
Overwatch	Blizzard Entertainment	May 24, 2016	XBO	91/100	90.58%
The Witcher 3: Wild Hunt – Blood and Wine	CD Projekt	May 31, 2016	PS4	91/100	90%
Overwatch	Blizzard Entertainment	May 24, 2016	PS4	90/100	90.87%
Dark Souls III	Bandai Namco Entertainment	March 24, 2016	XBO	87/100	90.4%
Owlboy	D-Pad Studio	November 1, 2016	WIN	88/100	90.39%
Tadpole Treble	BitFinity	May 6, 2016	WIN	90/100	90%
NBA 2K17	2K	September 20, 2016	WIN	90/100	90%
N++	Metanet Software	August 25, 2016	WIN	90/100	89.75%
Kentucky Route Zero – Act IV	Cardboard Computer	July 19, 2016	WIN	90/100	88.17%
NBA 2K17	2K	September 20, 2016	XBO	90/100	87.5%

=== Major awards ===
Category/Organization		34th Golden Joystick Awards November 18, 2016	The Game Awards 2016 December 1, 2016	20th Annual D.I.C.E. Awards February 23, 2017	17th Game Developers Choice Awards March 1, 2017	13th British Academy Games Awards April 6, 2017
Game of the Year		Dark Souls III	Overwatch			Uncharted 4: A Thief's End
Independent / Debut (Note: Certain award presentations combine these categories.)		Firewatch	Inside		Firewatch	
Mobile/Handheld	Mobile	Pokémon Go		Pokémon Go	Pokémon Go	
Mobile/Handheld	Handheld	Pokémon Go		Pokémon Sun and Moon	Pokémon Go	
VR/AR Game		—N/a	Rez Infinite	Superhot VR	Job Simulator	—N/a
Innovation		Pokémon Go	—N/a		No Man's Sky	That Dragon, Cancer
Artistic Achievement	Animation	The Witcher 3: Wild Hunt - Blood and Wine	Inside	Uncharted 4: A Thief's End	Inside	
Artistic Achievement	Art Direction	The Witcher 3: Wild Hunt - Blood and Wine	Inside	Inside	Inside	
Audio	Music	Fallout 4	Doom	Doom	Inside	Virginia
Audio	Sound Design	Fallout 4	Doom	Battlefield 1	Inside	The Last Guardian
Character or Performance		Doug Cockle as Geralt of Rivia; The Witcher 3: Wild Hunt – Blood and Wine	Nolan North as Nathan Drake; Uncharted 4: A Thief's End	Trico; The Last Guardian	—N/a	Cissy Jones as Delilah; Firewatch
Game Design or Direction	Game Design	—N/a	Overwatch	Overwatch	Overwatch	Inside
Game Design or Direction	Game Direction	—N/a	Overwatch	Inside	Overwatch	Inside
Narrative		The Witcher 3: Wild Hunt – Blood and Wine	Uncharted 4: A Thief's End		Firewatch	Inside
Technical Achievement		—N/a		Uncharted 4: A Thief's End		—N/a
Multiplayer/Online		Overwatch			—N/a	Overwatch
Action		—N/a	Doom	Overwatch	—N/a	
Adventure		—N/a	Dishonored 2	Uncharted 4: A Thief's End	—N/a	
Family		—N/a	Pokémon Go	Ratchet & Clank	—N/a	Overcooked
Fighting		—N/a	Street Fighter V		—N/a	
Role-Playing		—N/a	The Witcher 3: Wild Hunt - Blood and Wine	Dark Souls III	—N/a	
Sports/Racing	Sports	—N/a	Forza Horizon 3	Steep	—N/a	
Sports/Racing	Racing	—N/a	Forza Horizon 3	Forza Horizon 3	—N/a	
Strategy/Simulation		—N/a	Civilization VI		—N/a	
Special Award		Lifetime Achievement	Industry Icon Award	Hall of Fame	Lifetime Achievement Award	Special Award
Special Award		Eiji Aonuma	Hideo Kojima	Todd Howard	Tim Sweeney	Brenda Romero; Brandon Beck and Marc Merrill (Riot Games)

== Major events ==
Date	Event	Ref.
January 4	Activision Blizzard announced that they had acquired Major League Gaming.	
January 5	The Mixer streaming service is launched as Beam.	
January 6	Square Enix closed cloud video game subsidiary Shinra Technologies.	
January 8	Marc Laidlaw, lead writer of the Half-Life series, retired from Valve.	
January 8	David Brevik, the CEO of Gazillion Entertainment, left the company.	
January 12	Electronic Arts introduced Origin Access, a new subscription service for Windows.	
January 13	Leslie Benzies, producer and president of Rockstar North, left the company after a 16-month sabbatical. His positions were taken up by Aaron Garbut and Rob Nelson.	
January 16	Brian Horton, director of Rise of the Tomb Raider, left Crystal Dynamics for Infinity Ward.	
January 22	David Gaider, lead writer of Dragon Age, left BioWare.	
January 28	Bungie announced that Pete Parsons had replaced Harold Ryan as the company's president.	
January 28	GOG.com launched Games in Development, their own early access program.	
January 28	Sumo Digital announced their plan of establishing a new studio in Nottingham.	
January 29–31	PAX South 2016 held at the Henry B. Gonzalez Convention Center.	
February 8	Blizzard Entertainment celebrated its 25th anniversary.	
February 8	GameTrailers video game website was closed.	
February 15	Rapper Lupe Fiasco and esports player Daigo Umehara have an exhibition match of Street Fighter V to promote the game.	
February 16–18	Academy of Interactive Arts & Sciences hosted the 2016 D.I.C.E. Summit and 19th Annual D.I.C.E. Awards at the Mandalay Bay Convention Center in Las Vegas, Nevada; Hideo Kojima inducted into the AIAS Hall of Fame, and Satoru Iwata received the Lifetime Achievement Award.	
February 27	The Pokémon franchise celebrated its 20th anniversary.	
February	Ryan Barnard, game director of Tom Clancy's The Division, left Massive Entertainment for IO Interactive.	
March 7	Press Play, the developer of Max: The Curse of Brotherhood and Kalimba was closed by Microsoft Studios.	
March 9	Nexon acquired Big Huge Games, the developer of DomiNations.	
March 9	Riot Games acquired Radiant Entertainment, the developer of Rising Thunder.	
March 14–18	Game Developers Conference 2016 held in San Francisco, California.	
March 15	Jagex was acquired by Chinese mining company Shandong Honda.	
March 22	Bigpoint Games was acquired by Youzu Interactive.	
March 22	Evolution Studios, the developer of MotorStorm and Driveclub, was shut down by Sony Computer Entertainment.	
March 22	The Resident Evil franchise celebrated its 20th anniversary.	
March 24	Sony Computer Entertainment announced that they had founded a new studio, ForwardWorks to develop mobile games.	
March 31	n-Space, the developer of Sword Coast Legends, was closed.	
March 31	Sega completed its acquisition of Atlus. Future Atlus-developed titles localized for America will be published by Sega.	
April 5	Karthik and Guha Bala, founders of Vicarious Visions, left the company.	
April 11	Codemasters announced the company had employed the majority of Evolution Studios' employees.	
April 14	Leonard Boyarsky left Blizzard Entertainment to join Obsidian Entertainment.	
April 18	GameStop announced GameTrust, a new publishing division.	
April 20	Microsoft announced the discontinuation of the production of the Xbox 360.	
April 22	Tatsuya Minami, president of PlatinumGames, left the company.	
April 22–24	PAX East 2016 held at the Boston Convention and Exhibition Center.	
April 25	Patrice Desilets gained back the rights to 1666 Amsterdam and settled the lawsuit with Ubisoft.	
April 26	NIS America announced that they had cut ties with Atlus after Sega's acquisition of Atlus.	
April 26	SNK Playmore was restructured to form SNK.	
April 29	Lionhead Studios was closed by Microsoft Studios.	
May 10	Avalanche Software was shut down by parent company Disney Interactive Studios. Disney decided they would not self-publish any titles in the future, and instead rely on external partners.	
May 13	Yahoo! Games was shut down by Yahoo!.	
May 18	Electronic Arts announced that they had formed a new studio called Frostbite Lab.	
May 18	The creator of the Madden NFL series, Rich Hilleman, left Electronic Arts.	
May 18	IGN purchased assets of GameTrailers from Defy Media.	
May 30	Starbreeze Studios acquired the Payday franchise from 505 Games.	
June 1	Vivendi succeeded in Gameloft's hostile takeover, seizing control from the Guillemot brothers.	
June 2	Techland established a new publishing label called Techland Publishing.	
June 3	Aaron Linde, the writer of Battleborn, left Gearbox Software.	
June 6	Future Publishing purchased Imagine Publishing, the owner of GamesTM.	
June 10	Ubisoft Casablanca was closed by Ubisoft.	
June 12–14	Electronic Arts held their first fan-orientated public event named EA Play.	
June 14–16	E3 2016 was held at the Los Angeles Convention Center.	
June 21	Supercell, the developer of Clash of Clans, was acquired by Tencent for $8.6 billion.	
June 21	The Sonic the Hedgehog franchise celebrated its 25th anniversary.	
July 1	Josh Mosqueira, the director of Diablo III, announced that he had left Blizzard Entertainment.	
July 5	Sega announced that they had acquired Endless Space developer Amplitude Studios.	
July 8	Adam Boyes, VP of third party relations & developer technology group of Sony Interactive Entertainment, departed from the company.	
July 11	Splash Damage, the developer of the two Enemy Territory games, was acquired by Chinese chicken meat company Leyou.	
July 19	Dino Patti, co-founder of Playdead, departed the company.	
August 3–13	The International 2016, the second highest paying eSports tournament in history, was held at the KeyArena in Seattle.	
August 4–7	QuakeCon 2016 was held in Hilton Anatole in Dallas.	
August 5	Relentless Software, the developer of the Buzz! series, shut down.	
August 12	Nordic Games, the company that acquired most THQ's franchises, rebranded to THQ Nordic.	
August 15–16	Game Developers Conference Europe 2016 was held in Cologne, Germany.	
August 17–21	Gamescom 2016 held in Cologne, Germany.	
August 21	Shinzo Abe appears at the 2016 Summer Olympics closing ceremony out of a warp pipe while wearing Mario's hat to promote the 2020 Summer Olympics.	
August 29	Independent developer Renegade Kid was replaced by two companies: Atooi (who owns all of Renegade Kid's 2D IPs) and Infinitizmo (which owns all of Renegade Kid's 3D IPs).	
September 2–5	PAX West 2016 held at the Washington State Convention Center.	
September 9	The Crash Bandicoot franchise celebrated its 20th anniversary.	
September 13	Microsoft Studios launched Xbox Play Anywhere, a cross-play program between Windows 10 and Xbox One.	
September 13	Chris Metzen announced his departure from Blizzard Entertainment.	
September 15–18	Tokyo Game Show was held and celebrated its 20th Anniversary	
September 21	Blizzard Entertainment announced that they would be phasing out their online system Battle.net.	
September 28	Ubisoft acquired Ketchapp, the developer of 2048.	
October 12–13	Steam Dev Days held in Seattle, Washington.	
October 17	United Front Games, the developer of Sleeping Dogs, shut down.	
October 20	Nintendo publicly announces its next home console, the Switch.	
October 21	The Screen Actors Guild-American Federation of Television and Radio Artists begins a strike against eleven American video game developers and publishers over payments of residuals to voice and motion capture artists in video games.	
October 25	The Tomb Raider franchise celebrated its 20th anniversary.	
November 4–5	BlizzCon 2016 held in Anaheim, California.	
December 1	Annapurna Pictures establish video game division Annapurna Interactive.	
December 1	The Game Awards 2016 held in Los Angeles, California.	
December 3–4	PlayStation Experience 2016 held in Anaheim, California.	
December 16	Shinji Hirano, the former president of Konami Europe, became the CEO of Kojima Productions.	
December 20	Atlus formed a new development studio called Studio Zero.	
December 20	Crytek closed its studio in Bulgaria, Hungary, Turkey, South Korea, and China.	

== Notable deaths ==
- February 3 – Joe Alaskey, 63, voice actor known for the voice of Bugs Bunny and others in the Looney Tunes franchise.
- March 17 – Larry Drake, 67, voice actor known for the voice of Kazdan Paratus in Star Wars: The Force Unleashed.
- June 3 – Muhammad Ali, 74, boxer who appeared in Muhammad Ali Heavyweight Boxing, Foes of Ali, Knockout Kings, UFC 5, and WWE 2K24.
- June 10 – Christina Grimmie, 22, music YouTuber known as zeldaxlove64 and host of Disney.com's gaming show Power Up. Grimmie also appeared in a commercial for the Kinect.

== Hardware releases ==
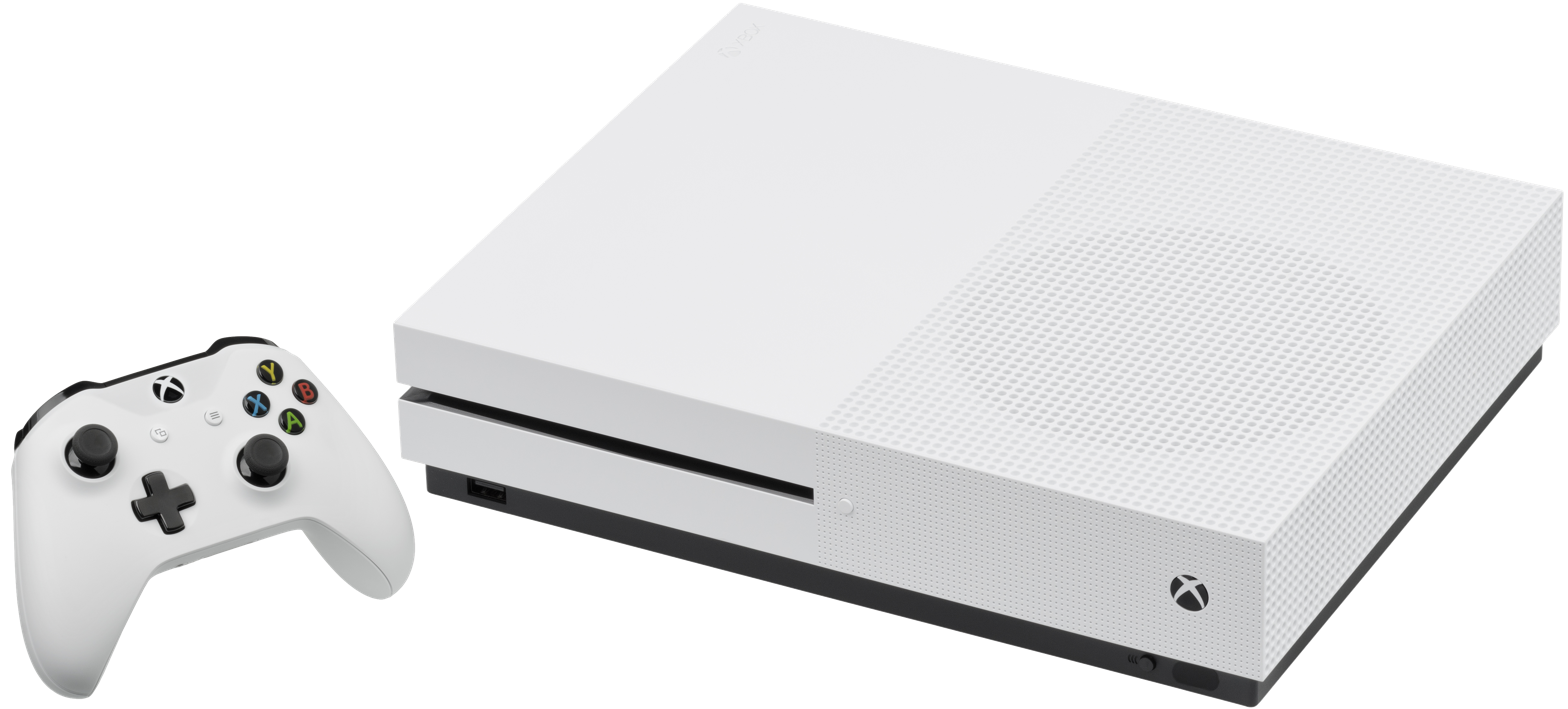
Xbox One S

The following is a list of game-related hardware released in 2016.

This year saw the launch of many Virtual reality headsets, such as the Oculus Rift CV1, Microsoft HoloLens, HTC Vive, PlayStation VR, and Google Daydream.

Microsoft released its first model revision of the Xbox One, the Xbox One S and Sony released its first and only two model revisions of the PlayStation 4, the PlayStation 4 Slim & PlayStation 4 Pro.

Date	Console	Manufacturer	Ref.
March 28	Oculus Rift CV1^{WW}	Oculus VR	
March 30	Microsoft HoloLens	Microsoft	
April 5	HTC Vive^{WW}	HTC	
August 2	Xbox One S^{WW}	Microsoft	
September 15	PlayStation 4 Slim^{WW}	Sony	
October 13	PlayStation VR^{WW}	Sony	
November 10	Google Daydream	Google	
November 10	PlayStation 4 Pro^{WW}	Sony	
November 10	NES Classic Edition^{JP}/^{AUS}	Nintendo	
November 11	NES Classic Edition^{NA}/^{EU}	Nintendo	

== Cancelled / discontinued games ==
=== Cancelled ===
- Batman: Arkham Knight (OSX, LIN)
- EverQuest Next (WIN, PS4)
- Fable Legends (WIN, XBO)
- Halo Online (WIN)
- Hyper Light Drifter (PSV, WiiU)
- Nosgoth (WIN)
- Not a Hero (PSV)
- Project: Knoxville (XBO)
- Rising Thunder (WIN)
- Scribblenauts: Fighting Words (iOS)
- Shantae: Half-Genie Hero (PS3, X360)
- Triad Wars (WIN)
- The Walking Dead: A New Frontier (PS3, X360)
- Unnamed extreme sports game by Criterion Games
- Whore of the Orient (WIN, PS4, XBO)
- Yooka-Laylee (WiiU)

=== Discontinued ===
- Darkspore (WIN)
- Dust 514 (PS3)
- Might & Magic: Duel of Champions (WIN)
- PlanetSide (WIN)
- Project Spark (WIN, X360, XBO)
- The Mighty Quest for Epic Loot (WIN)
- Tom Clancy's EndWar Online (WIN)
- Tom Clancy's Ghost Recon Phantoms (WIN)

== Video game-based film and television releases ==
Title	Date	Type	Distributor(s)	Franchise	Original game publisher(s)	Ref.
Persona 3 The Movie: No. 4, Winter of Rebirth	January 23, 2016	Anime film	Aniplex	Persona	Atlus	
Dofus – Book 1: Julith	February 3, 2016	Animated film	Gebeka Films	Dofus	Ankama	
Beep: A Documentary History of Game Sound	March 15, 2016	Documentary film	Ehtonal	—N/a	—N/a	
Street Fighter: Resurrection	March 15, 2016	Web series	Machinima	Street Fighter	Capcom	
Brotherhood: Final Fantasy XV	March 30, 2016	Original net animation	A-1 Pictures	Final Fantasy	Square Enix	
Ace Attorney	April 2, 2016	Anime television series	Funimation	Ace Attorney	Capcom	
Ratchet & Clank	April 29, 2016	CGI animated film	Focus Features	Ratchet & Clank	Sony Computer Entertainment	
The Angry Birds Movie	May 20, 2016	CGI animated film	Sony Pictures Releasing	Angry Birds	Rovio Entertainment	
ELeague	May 24, 2016	Esports television series	TBS	—N/a	—N/a	
Warcraft	June 10, 2016	Feature film	Universal Pictures	Warcraft	Blizzard Entertainment	
Dead Rising: Endgame	June 20, 2016	Feature film	Crackle	Dead Rising	Capcom	
Tales of Zestiria the X	July 3, 2016	Anime television series	Funimation	Tales	Bandai Namco Entertainment	
Puzzle & Dragons X	July 4, 2016	Anime television series	Funimation	Puzzle & Dragons	GungHo Online Entertainment	
Kingsglaive: Final Fantasy XV	July 9, 2016	CGI animated film	Sony Pictures Entertainment	Final Fantasy	Square Enix	
Volcanion and the Mechanical Marvel	July 16, 2016	Anime film	Toho (Japan); Disney XD (United States)	Pokémon	Nintendo; The Pokémon Company	
Pokémon Generations	September 16, 2016	Limited anime webseries	YouTube	Pokémon	Nintendo; The Pokémon Company	
Monster Hunter Stories: Ride On	October 2, 2016	Anime television series	Fuji TV	Monster Hunter	Capcom	
Skylanders Academy	October 28, 2016	3D animated series	Netflix	Skylanders	Activision	
Assassin's Creed	December 21, 2016	Feature film	20th Century Fox	Assassin's Creed	Ubisoft	
Resident Evil: The Final Chapter	December 23, 2016	Feature film	Sony Pictures Releasing	Resident Evil	Capcom	

== See also ==
- 2016 in esports
- 2016 in games
