= Moonrise (video game) =

Cancelled video game

- Developer: Undead Labs
- Publisher: Kabam
- Platforms: Android, iOS, Windows, MacOS
- Release: Cancelled
- Genres: Monster-taming, role-playing
- Modes: Single-player, multiplayer

Moonrise is a cancelled free-to-play role-playing video game developed by Undead Labs and published by Kabam for Android and iOS. It was to be the first game developed by Undead Labs to not be part of the State of Decay series and the first not developed in association with Xbox Game Studios. Undead Labs founder Jeff Strain, cited Monster Hunter, Pokémon, Magic: The Gathering and Hearthstone as influences in putting together Moonrise. It was later decided to also release Moonrise for macOS and Windows.

In May 2015, it was announced that Moonrise would be entering Steam Early Access on May 27, 2015. Early access bundles were being offered at $14.99 for the Warden's Edition and offered early access, an exclusive Solari skin, and a bundle of premium in-game content offered at less than the regular price. Guildmaster's Edition would go for $19.99 and offer early access, two Solari skins, and a bundle of more premium in-game for less than the than the regular price.
