= State of Decay (video game) =

2013 video game

State of DECAY
- Developer: Undead Labs
- Publisher: Microsoft Studios
- Producers: Jeff Strain; Jessica Brunelle
- Designers: James Phinney; Richard Foge; Nick Mhley
- Programmer: Shaun Leach
- Artist: Doug Williams
- Writer: Travis Stout
- Composers: Jesper Kyd; Dreissk
- Series: State of Decay
- Engine: CryEngine 3
- Platforms: Xbox 360; Windows; Xbox One
- Release: June 5, 2013: Original Version Xbox 360; WW: June 5, 2013; Windows; WW: November 5, 2013; Year One Survival Edition Windows & Xbox One; WW: April 28, 2015
- Genre: Action
- Mode: Single-player

State of Decay is a 2013 action-adventure survival video game developed by Undead Labs and published by Microsoft Studios. The game combines elements of shooters, stealth, role-playing and strategy games and the game challenges players to survive by exploring, scavenging, and fighting the undead. It places emphasis on how the player's leaderships skills fare against an onslaught of problems, such as diminishing survival resources, group trust and morale, zombie extermination, base defenses, and people's lives.

State of Decay was released for the Xbox 360 on June 5, 2013 to positive reviews from critics. A Windows version was released on September 20, 2013, via Steam's Early Access, with a release following on November 5, 2013. A remastered version called the Year-One Survival Edition was released for Windows and Xbox One on April 28, 2015 to mixed reviews from critics. The game had sold over 1 million units by November 2013.

State of Decay 2 was announced at Xbox's E3 2016 press conference. The game introduced cooperative multiplayer and was released on May 22, 2018. State of Decay 3 was announced at Xbox's 2020 Games Showcase and is in development.

== Gameplay ==
State of Decay emphasizes utilizing existing resources, which are finite. Here the player character stands atop a tower and scouts for possible survival camps and places that may contain supplies.

State of Decay contains elements of third-person shooter, combat and simulation (building base and outposts). The player is in charge of a small group of survivors and can either follow the storyline or perform tasks that ensure their community's survival. The game world is 16 square kilometers, 8 square kilometers of which is playable.

The player can choose from several locations to build a base, then reinforce and improve it with various facilities like watch towers, gardens, sleeping quarters, kitchens, workshops, medical bays, etc. to help keep survivors safe and healthy. Part of the game is balancing the use of resources: food, medicine, ammo and construction materials. They can be obtained by scavenging or trading with NPCs. Only food can be grown at the base.

The player can interact with survivors outside of their group: trading with them, helping them or recruiting them. The game features two relationship meters, the first determines if a survivor can be recruited, and the second dictates if they can be controlled. Only one survivor can be controlled at a time, though the player can ask an AI-controlled survivor to accompany them, and in certain missions, one or more AI-controlled survivors will accompany the player.

The Storyline mode features around 150 characters, with varying facial features and clothing. Each character has a fixed set of "traits" which give them advantages or flaws (such as tire out more easily, or can improve a certain skill faster). Except for the story-related characters, most characters can be assigned to survivor groups and be recruited. Each character also has an "attitude" parameter, affected by game events (a near death experience, death of another character, or having accomplished a difficult task). These attitudes can affect their behaviors, sometimes requiring player intervention.

Zombies are the main threat in State of Decay. They respawn infinitely (unless the player establishes an outpost, which prevents spawns), are attracted to noise, and are capable of sprinting nearly as fast as the characters. The player can choose to confront them directly, use stealth to sneak past them, or divert them using items like firecrackers. In addition, there are special types of zombies, such as the animal-like "Ferals" or the tank-like "Juggernauts" that are quite dangerous in one-on-one confrontations.

The game features over 100 different weapons, including around 30 melee weapons that can be found while scavenging (they cannot be crafted). Melee weapon and firearms are further divided into sub-categories, which have different attack animations and effects. All weapons have a durability rating, and will break when used excessively without repairs. Besides weapons, the player can find or create various consumables to improve their chances of survival, such as painkillers and pipe bombs. Besides walking, the player has access to several types of cars, each with its own characteristics like maneuverability and speed. All vehicles can be damaged and destroyed when running over zombies or hitting obstacles, although they can be repaired at the home base if they have the necessary facilities.

== Plot ==
The story takes place in the fictional Trumbull Valley. The first playable character is Marcus Campbell, a store clerk. After returning from a fishing trip with his friend and a Trumbull local, Ed Jones, he finds that the world has degenerated into a zombie apocalypse. The two are joined by Maya Torres, a soldier. They acquire a walkie-talkie and make contact with Lily Ritter. Following her direction, they make their way to a church called the Church of the Ascension, where Lily and several other survivors have made a home base. With Ed wounded, the trio accept Lily's offer to let them stay.

The survivors become aware of the United States Army's presence in Trumbull Valley, led by Sergeant Erik Tan and Captain Diane Montressor. They learn that the army's top priority is not to evacuate the survivors, but to contain and try to find the cause of the outbreak. The local civic leader Judge Lawton has barricaded the courthouse with the law enforcement. She places citizens in her care under martial laws, planning to rebuild after the zombie incursion blows over.

The courthouse falls to a zombie attack and Judge Lawton dies. Captain Montressor is evacuated, leaving behind Sergeant Tan and his men. The player, along with Tan, discovers numerous dead bodies dumped at the reservoir, explaining the cause of the, "Black Fever", that has plagued numerous survivors in Trumbull Valley. With their only water source contaminated and long-term survival no longer an option, they plan to leave the valley. After raiding a zombie-infested warehouse to get explosives, the group head to the only road leading out of the valley, blocked by a massive concrete wall.

While Tan sets up the explosives, the player holds off incoming zombies. Tan realizes the detonator has malfunctioned, and the explosives cannot be detonated from a safe distance. He volunteers to manually detonate it, claiming he is already infected. He sacrifices himself and sets off the explosives, which destroys the wall. As the smoke clears, the player sees the other side is also filled with destroyed cars and bodies, implying the apocalypse has already spread outside Trumbull Valley. The survivors leave the valley and the game ends.

== Downloadable content ==
=== Breakdown ===
On July 20, 2013, in conjunction with the PC development for State of Decay, Undead Labs announced downloadable content (DLC) titled "Breakdown" for both PC and console users. The DLC adds a sandbox mode, where the player leads a group of survivors in repairing an RV in order to escape the valley. The DLC allows infinite gameplay and no storyline, allowing players to put their survival skills to the test. Breakdown adds 6 levels/tiers for players to survive in, and as players progress from one level to the next, the difficulty increases, resulting in numerous faster and stronger zombies, along with higher numbers of special zombies, forcing players to sneak their way around the map and use distractions in order to survive the higher levels. To continue on to the next level, the player needs to find the RV, which spawns in random locations throughout the map with each level. The players are only allowed to take a total of six characters (Lily included) with them to the next level. On November 15, 2013, Undead Labs officially announced the Breakdown release date for November 29, 2013.

=== Lifeline ===
On February 11, 2014, Undead Labs announced the "Lifeline" DLC, confirming it to include the fictional city of Danforth that can be seen just outside Fairfield. On February 27, it was explained that the DLC will explore the military's side during the first days of the outbreak.

The player will play the role of a military unit by the name of Greyhound One in Danforth City. The player will be tasked with keeping a group of survivors alive long enough to get them to safety, as well as defending the main base by setting traps and planning tactics. But unlike the typical survival only bases that deal with just excesses of hordes, there is a new threat called sieges that get progressively harder with each one that passes. The DLC is set on more of a time-based approach instead of the never-ending approach seen in the Breakdown DLC. At the Pax East 2014 convention, Undead Labs expected it to be released on June 6, 2014. The release date was revealed to be Friday, May 30, earlier than was previously expected. The DLC features a new map and narrative. The DLC has been priced the same as the first DLC, Breakdown, which is $6.99 / £5.59.

== Development and release ==
State of Decay was announced in 2011 as an Xbox Live Arcade title originally titled Class 3. Jeff Strain, the founder of ArenaNet and co-creator of World of Warcraft, wanted a game where individual players could make up their own zombie survival plans and put them to the test. Then, he set out to create the game, which runs on CryEngine 3. On May 16, 2013, Undead Labs announced that State of Decay had gone into the final certification process and was ready for testing by the game's publisher, Microsoft Studios. State of Decay was envisioned as a step towards Undead Labs' full online console game, Class4. Class4 would have been one of the first zombie massively multiplayer online games (MMOs) to come to the Xbox One. In a 2014 interview, Undead Labs founder Jeff Strain stated that State of Decay had become a franchise, with the company's partnership with Microsoft Studios confirmed. He stated that the first State of Decay was "just the start of (Undead Labs') long-term ambitions".

The Australian Classification Board refused classification because "[the game] contains the option of self-administered drugs throughout, in order to restore players' health or boost their stamina". Jeff Strain said "we are going to come up with options, including changing names of certain medications in the game to comply with ratings requirements. Whatever our path forward, it's going to take a bit." On July 11, 2013 State of Decay was rated R18+ for high impact violence.

== Reception ==
Reception

Aggregate score
Aggregator	Score
Metacritic	X360: 78/100; PC: 79/100; XONE: 72/100

Review scores
Publication	Score
Destructoid	8.5/10
Game Informer	7/10
GameSpot	8/10
GameTrailers	8.2/10
IGN	8.9/10
Joystiq	3.5/5
Official Xbox Magazine (US)	8/10
Polygon	8.5/10
VideoGamer.com	9/10

State of Decay received "generally favorable" reviews from critics for the PC and Xbox 360 versions, while the Xbox One version "mixed or average" reviews, according to review aggregator website Metacritic. Sanje of Undead Labs stated that "2013 Was a Damned Good Year" in terms of the positive reviews the game received.

Polygon gave a positive review, praising the survival and role-playing aspects of the game. Reviewer Arthur Gies wrote, "State of Decay is one of the most cohesive, terrifying and engaging open-world games I've ever played."

=== Sales ===
State of Decay sold over 250,000 units in its first 48 hours of release to the Xbox Live Arcade. By of June 17, 2013, the game had sold over 550,000 units. By the end of June, the game had sold over 700,000 units, making it the second-fastest-selling XBLA game of all time. On October 4, 2013 Undead Labs announced that the game had sold 1 million units. This figure combined both XBLA and Steam Early Access sales. On November 30, Undead Labs had sold over 1 million units of State of Decay.

== Sequel ==
A sequel, State of Decay 2, was announced live at Xbox's E3 2016 press conference. The game was released on May 22, 2018.
