= 13th British Academy Games Awards =

Game award ceremony in 2017

- Date: 6 April 2017
- Location: Tobacco Dock
- Hosted by: Danny Wallace
- Best Game: Uncharted 4: A Thief's End
- Most awards: Inside (4)
- Most nominations: Uncharted 4: A Thief's End (8)

The 13th British Academy Video Game Awards awarded by the British Academy of Film and Television Arts, is an award ceremony that was held on 6 April 2017 at Tobacco Dock. The ceremony honoured achievement in video gaming in 2016 and was hosted by Danny Wallace.

== Nominees ==
The nominees for the 13th British Academy Video Games Awards were announced on 9 March 2017. Uncharted 4: A Thief's End received the most nominations with eight in total; Inside received the second most with seven nominations, followed by Firewatch with six and Overcooked, Overwatch, The Witness and The Last Guardian with four each.

The winners were announced during the awards ceremony on 6 April 2017.

=== Awards ===
Artistic Achievement: Inside – Playdead/Playdead; Abzû – Giant Squid/505 Games; Dishonored 2 – Arkane Studios/Bethesda Softworks; The Last Guardian – Japan Studio/Sony Interactive Entertainment; Uncharted 4: A Thief's End – Naughty Dog/Sony Interactive Entertainment; Unravel – Coldwood Interactive/Electronic Arts	Game Innovation: That Dragon, Cancer – Numinous Games/Numinous Games; Batman: Arkham VR – Rocksteady Studios/Warner Bros. Interactive Entertainment; Firewatch – Campo Santo/Panic; Pokémon Go – Niantic/Niantic; Unseen Diplomacy – Triangular Pixels/Triangular Pixels; The Witness – Thekla, Inc./Thekla, Inc.
Audio Achievement: The Last Guardian – Japan Studio/Sony Interactive Entertainment; Battlefield 1 – EA DICE/Electronic Arts; Doom – id Software/Bethesda Softworks; Inside – Playdead/Playdead; Rez Infinite – United Game Artists/Enhance Games; Uncharted 4: A Thief's End – Naughty Dog/Sony Interactive Entertainment	Mobile: Pokémon Go – Niantic/Niantic; The Banner Saga 2 – Stoic/Versus Evil; Dawn of Titans – NaturalMotion/Zynga; Deus Ex Go – Square Enix Montreal/Square Enix; Pokémon Sun and Moon – Game Freak/The Pokémon Company; Reigns – Nerial/Devolver Digital
Best Game: Uncharted 4: A Thief's End – Naughty Dog/Sony Interactive Entertainment; Firewatch – Campo Santo/Panic; Inside – Playdead/Playdead; Overwatch – Blizzard Entertainment/Blizzard Entertainment; Stardew Valley – ConcernedApe/Chucklefish; Titanfall 2 – Respawn Entertainment/Electronic Arts	Multiplayer: Overwatch – Blizzard Entertainment/Blizzard Entertainment; Battlefield 1 – EA DICE/Electronic Arts; Forza Horizon 3 – Playground Games/Microsoft Studios; Overcooked – Ghost Town Games/Team17; Titanfall 2 – Respawn Entertainment/Electronic Arts; Tom Clancy's The Division – Ubisoft Massive/Ubisoft
British Game: Overcooked – Ghost Town Games/Team17; Batman: Arkham VR – Rocksteady Studios/Warner Bros. Interactive Entertainment; Forza Horizon 3 – Playground Games/Microsoft Studios; No Man's Sky – Hello Games/Hello Games; Planet Coaster – Frontier Developments/Frontier Developments; Virginia – Variable State/505 Games	Music: Virginia – Lyndon Holland; Abzû – Austin Wintory; Doom – Mick Gordon, Chris Hite, Chad Mossholder; Inside – Martin Stig Andersen, SØS Gunver Ryberg; The Last Guardian – Takeshi Furukawa; Uncharted 4: A Thief's End – Henry Jackman, Jonathan Mayer, Scott Hanau
Debut Game: Firewatch – Campo Santo/Panic; Overcooked – Ghost Town Games/Team17; Oxenfree – Night School Studio/Night School Studio; That Dragon, Cancer – Numinous Games/Numinous Games; Virginia – Variable State/505 Games; The Witness – Thekla, Inc./Thekla, Inc.	Narrative: Inside – Playdead/Playdead; Dishonored 2 – Arkane Studios/Bethesda Softworks; Firewatch – Campo Santo/Panic; Mafia III – Hangar 13/2K Games; Oxenfree – Night School Studio/Night School Studio; Uncharted 4: A Thief's End – Naughty Dog/Sony Interactive Entertainment
Evolving Game: Rocket League – Psyonix/Psyonix; Destiny: Rise of Iron – Bungie/Activision; Elite Dangerous: Horizons – Frontier Developments/Frontier Developments; Eve Online – CCP Games/CCP Games; Final Fantasy XIV: A Realm Reborn – Square Enix/Square Enix; Hitman – IO Interactive/Square Enix	Original Property: Inside – Playdead/Playdead; Firewatch – Campo Santo/Panic; The Last Guardian – Japan Studio/Sony Interactive Entertainment; Overwatch – Blizzard Entertainment/Blizzard Entertainment; Unravel – Coldwood Interactive/Electronic Arts; The Witness – Thekla, Inc./Thekla, Inc.
Family: Overcooked – Ghost Town Games/Team17; Lego Star Wars: The Force Awakens – Mike Taylor, Jamie Eden and James Norton, TT Games/Warner Bros. Interactive Entertainment; The Playroom VR – Japan Studio/Sony Interactive Entertainment; Pokémon Go – Niantic/Niantic; Ratchet and Clank – Insomniac Games/Sony Interactive Entertainment; Toca Hair Salon 3 – Toca Boca/Toca	Performer: Cissy Jones – Firewatch as Delilah; Alex Hernandez – Mafia III as Lincoln Clay; Emily Rose – Uncharted 4: A Thief's End as Elena Fisher; Navid Negahban – 1979 Revolution: Black Friday as Hajj Agha; Nolan North – Uncharted 4: A Thief's End as Nathan Drake; Troy Baker – Uncharted 4: A Thief's End as Sam Drake
Game Design: Inside - Playdead/Playdead; Battlefield 1 – EA DICE/Electronic Arts; Dishonored 2 - Arkane Studios/Bethesda Softworks; Overwatch - Blizzard Entertainment/Blizzard Entertainment; Titanfall 2 - Respawn Entertainment/Electronic Arts; The Witness - Thekla, Inc./Thekla, Inc.

=== BAFTA Special Award ===
- Brenda Romero

=== BAFTA Ones to Watch Award ===
- Among the Stones - Lukasz Gomula, Alberto Taiuti, James Wood, Roberton Macken, Kevin McKenna, Rory Sweeney
- Pentagrab - Andrew Fullarton, Thomas Slade, Nick Kondylis, Cari Watterton, Dale Smith
- Rebound - Kieran Gallagher, Isaac Pringle, Mark Tempini, Andrew Graham, Alexander MacDiarmid, Vladislav Veselinov, Craig Russell, Alexandra Donaldson

=== AMD eSports Audience Award ===
- Clash Royale
- Counter Strike: Global Offensive
- Dota 2
- League of Legends
- Overwatch
- Street Fighter V

=== Games with multiple nominations and wins ===
==== Nominations ====
Nominations	Game
8	Uncharted 4: A Thief's End
7	Inside
6	Firewatch
5	Overwatch
4	Overcooked
4	The Last Guardian
4	The Witness
3	Battlefield 1
3	Dishonored 2
3	Pokémon Go
3	Titanfall 2
3	Virginia
2	Abzû
2	Batman: Arkham VR
2	Doom
2	Forza Horizon 3
2	Mafia III
2	Oxenfree
2	That Dragon, Cancer
2	Unravel

==== Wins ====
Wins	Game
4	Inside
2	Firewatch
2	Overcooked
