= Knoxville (video game) =

Project: Knoxville
- Promotional poster of Project: Knoxville
- Developer: Press Play
- Publisher: Microsoft Studios
- Director: Mikkel Thorsted
- Platform: Xbox One
- Release: Cancelled
- Genres: Survival, action
- Mode: Multiplayer

Project: Knoxville is a cancelled video game developed by Press Play and published by Microsoft Studios exclusively for the Xbox One. The game puts emphasis on survival and lets players co-operate with each other to achieve success. The game adapts an open development and allows the community to give input regarding the game's development. As Press Play was closed in March 2016, the game was no longer in development.

== Gameplay ==
Project: Knoxville is a third-person multiplayer survival game. Throughout the game, players can jump, sprint, and interact with the environments. The game's major objective is to survive and escape from an arena which is filled with different hostile enemies. These arenas are round-based, each one lasting for approximately ten to twenty minutes, and the game does not feature a persistent world. Players can interact with characters that are controlled by other players, and can choose whether to trust them or to distrust them. The game supports co-operative gameplay. As a result, players have the option to demand attention from other players, as well as requesting weapons, healing and currency from them. Some missions require multiple players to work and ally together, or else they will be unable to complete them. Competitive multiplayer elements are also present in the game, in which players can choose to eliminate or backfire at each other.

In the arena, the player will be accompanied by seven different players at the beginning of each match. They can pick up weapons that are sparsely scattered across the world to defend themselves and attack enemies They are also tasked to collect coins, which can be used to escape a level and upgrade the character the player is using. The number of coins in a level is limited, and some players may not be able to collect the coin needed to escape the level, and will get left behind in the arena. Players who die in the game can also enter an Afterlife mode. They can spawn objects that will influence a round, such as enemies or medkit next to surviving characters.

== Development ==
The game was developed by Press Play, who had previously worked on Max: The Curse of Brotherhood and Kalimba. On August 18, 2015, Press Play revealed three different projects they may work on, and asked the public to vote and choose the one that they wanted the most. The three projects were Project: Dwarka, Project: Karoo and Project: Knoxville. Dwarka is a dungeon crawler set in a first-person perspective. It tasks players to play as a dwarf and investigate dungeons, which are procedurally generated. Karoo is a simulation game, which tasks players to build and customize their own vehicles, and explore a wasteland to gather different resources. The third project is Knoxville, which was ultimately chosen by the community. All of them feature multiplayer components.

According to Press Play, the game was inspired by films like The Running Man and The Hunger Games. Similar to the films, they put emphasis on survival and the relationships between players. The game's development was aimed to be transparent, as they would share new information of the game every other week through Twitch. Supporters would also get to join meetings of the development team through Skype.

On March 7, 2016, Microsoft announced that Press Play was closing down, and that the development of Project: Knoxville had ended. The decision was made as Microsoft wished to "focus its investment and development on the games and franchises that fans find most exciting and want to play".
