= Undead Labs =

American video game developer

Undead Labs LLC
- Logo since 2024
- Type: Private
- Industry: Video games
- Founded: November 23, 2009; 16 years ago
- Founder: Jeff Strain
- Headquarters: Seattle, Washington, US
- Number of locations: 3 (2024)
- Key people: Philip Holt (studio head)
- Products: State of Decay series
- Number of employees: ~60 (2018)
- Parent: Xbox Game Studios (2018–2026)
- Website: undeadlabs.com

Undead Labs LLC is an independent American video game developer based in Seattle, Washington. The company was founded in November 2009 by Jeff Strain and developed the State of Decay series. In 2018, Undead Labs became part of Microsoft Studios (now known as Xbox Game Studios). In 2026, Undead Labs separated from Microsoft and became independent as an employee-owned studio.

== History ==
Undead Labs was founded on November 23, 2009, by Jeff Strain, with the sole focus on zombie-based games. On February 3, 2011, Undead Labs announced that they were partnering with Microsoft Game Studios to publish their games on the Xbox 360 and now also the Xbox One. This decision was made after most of the other publishers who showed interest in their games were requesting what they described as "World of Warcraft clones". The first game State of Decay was released on the Xbox 360 on June 5, 2013, and on Microsoft Windows on November 5, 2013.

On January 11, 2014, it was announced that Undead Labs has signed a multi-year, multi-title agreement with Microsoft Studios. Jeff Strain stated that the first State of Decay was "just the start of (Undead Labs') long-term ambitions", and spoke of many future titles potentially entering the franchise.

Moonrise was shut down at the end of 2015.

At E3 2018, Microsoft announced they had entered into an agreement to acquire Undead Labs into Microsoft Studios. In 2020, the studio announced their next title State of Decay 3 for Xbox Series X/S and PC. In July 2021 Undead Labs opened a second studio in Orlando, Florida focused on developing animation technology in Unreal Engine 5 for Undead Labs as well as for other studios under the Xbox Game Studios banner. Strain left the company by October 2021 and founded another studio, Possibility Space.

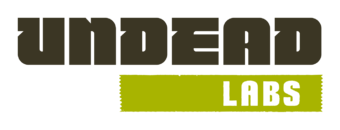
Undead Labs logo from 2009-2024

A 2022 investigation by Kotaku reported on a sexist studio culture, which was abetted by Philip Holt, the new studio head who replaced Strain, and then-head of HR Anne Schlosser. Schlosser was removed after a Microsoft HR investigation. The toxic work environment, which continued after Schlosser's departure, led to a high employee turnover rate, especially among experienced staff. These issues, combined with a lack of design vision, contributed to extensive delays in the development of State of Decay 3. Employees also blamed Microsoft for not living up to its goals of diversity, equity, and inclusion by not responding to reports of abuse in a timely manner.

On June 9, 2024, Undead Labs was rebranded with a new logo and website following the Xbox Showcase, where the company showed its first trailer for State of Decay 3.

State of Decay 3 was given another trailer during the 2026 Xbox Game Showcase, as well as being given a release date of 2027. Confirmed to be releasing on Windows, Xbox Series X/S, and PlayStation 5.

In June 2026, Bloomberg reported that Xbox planned massive layoffs to "reset" its struggling gaming business. Undead Labs, as well as four other gaming studios owned by Xbox, were named as "studios in danger," with Xbox potentially looking to close or sell the studio to another buyer. In July, Xbox announced that the studio would be sold to an undisclosed buyer, which was later to be revealed as Splash Damage, a UK studio funded by Emona Capital. However, that deal was not finalized. In September, Undead Labs separated from Microsoft and became independent as an employee-owned studio while retaining the rights to the State of Decay.

== Games developed ==
Year	Title	Platform(s)
2013	State of Decay	Windows, Xbox 360, Xbox One
2018	State of Decay 2	Windows, Xbox One, Xbox Series X/S
2027	State of Decay 3	PlayStation 5, Windows, Xbox Series X/S

=== Cancelled ===
Title	Platform(s)
Moonrise	Android, iOS, Windows, MacOS
