= Overcooked 2 =

2018 video game

- Developers: Team17; Ghost Town Games
- Publisher: Team17
- Engine: Unity
- Platforms: Linux; macOS; Nintendo Switch; PlayStation 4; Windows; Xbox One; PlayStation 5; Xbox Series X/S; Google Stadia; Nintendo Switch 2
- Release: Linux, macOS, NS, PS4, Windows, Xbox One: WW: August 7, 2018; Amazon Luna: US: October 20, 2020; Xbox Series X/S: WW: November 10, 2020; PlayStation 5: NA/OC: November 12, 2020; WW: November 19, 2020; Stadia: WW: May 5, 2022; Nintendo Switch 2: WW: November 6, 2025
- Genre: Simulation
- Modes: Single-player, multiplayer

Overcooked 2 (Note: Stylized as OVERCOOKED! 2) is a cooperative cooking simulation video game developed by Team17 alongside Ghost Town Games, and published by Team17. The sequel to Overcooked, it was released for Linux, macOS, Nintendo Switch, PlayStation 4, Windows, and Xbox One on August 7, 2018. The game was released for Amazon Luna on October 20, 2020.

Overcooked: All You Can Eat, a compilation game that includes both Overcooked and Overcooked 2, was released for PlayStation 5 and Xbox Series X/S on November 12, 2020. The compilation came to Nintendo Switch, PlayStation 4, Windows, and Xbox One on March 23, 2021 and on Google Stadia on May 5, 2022. A Nintendo Switch 2 edition released on November 6, 2025.

== Gameplay ==
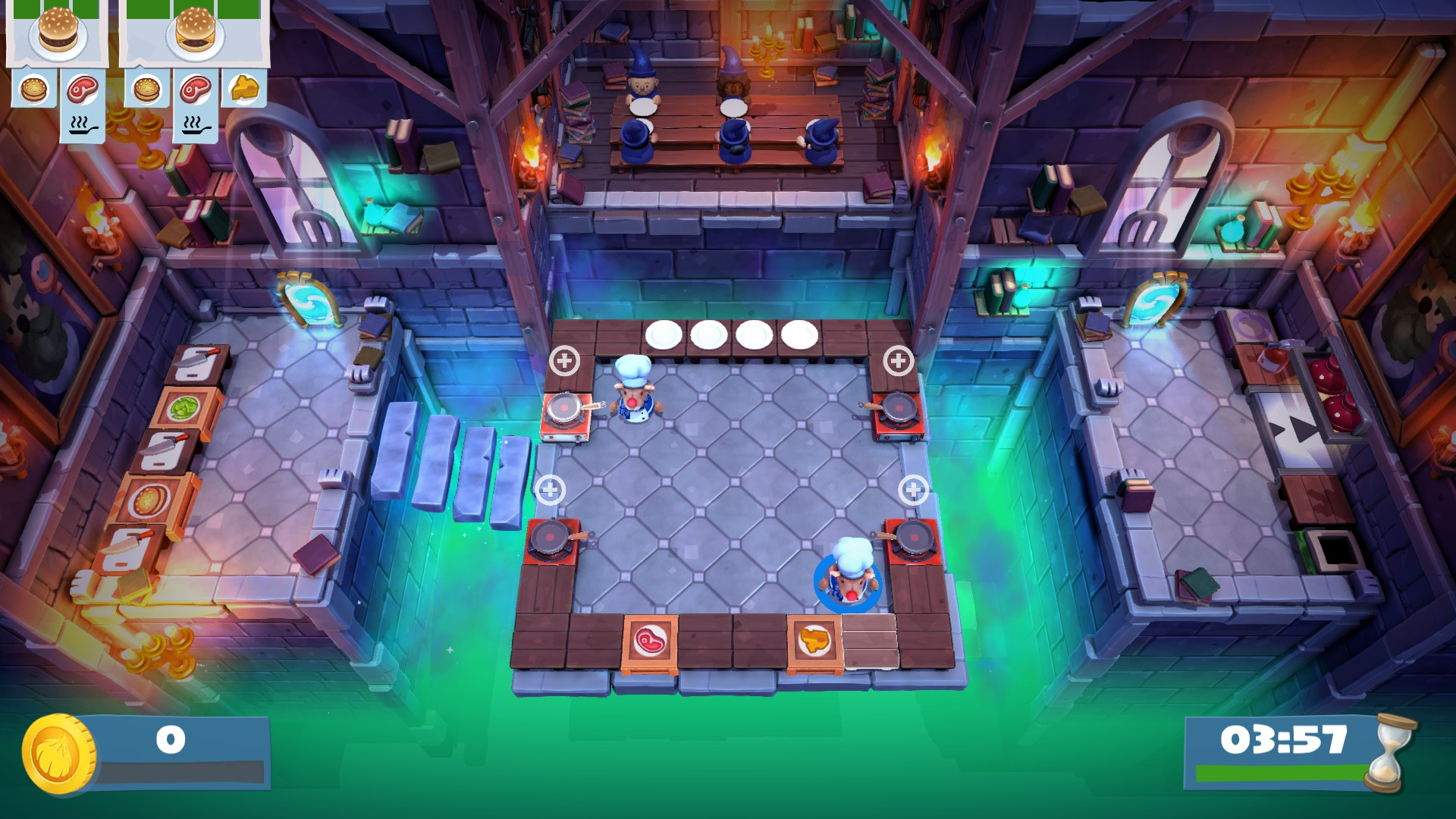
Screenshot

In the cooking simulator game Overcooked 2, teams of up to four players cooperatively prepare and cook orders in absurd restaurants. Players gather, chop, cook ingredients, combine them on plates, serve dishes, and wash dishes. Between coordinating short orders and bumping into each other's characters, the game tends to overwhelm. The game features two modes: versus mode allows two teams of two players to compete in the same kitchen to complete the most orders; arcade mode allows players to select the desired theme with a randomly generated stage. The sequel builds upon the original game, which was released in 2016, with new interactive levels, restaurant themes, chef costumes, and recipes. Some levels have moving floors and other obstacles that complicate the cooking process, including portals, moving walkways, and impassable fires. Other levels transition between settings and recipes, such as one that begins with preparing salads in a hot air balloon and ends crash-landed in a sushi kitchen. The sequel introduces ingredient tossing, such that players can throw uncooked items to another chef or pot from far away, and online multiplayer, in which teams can connect either across a local wireless network or through online matchmaking.

=== Plot ===
The game is set in the Onion Kingdom, where the player’s chefs travel across regions to stop zombie toast, known as the “Unbread.” Through the regions traveled, players encounter environments and kitchens reflecting different areas of the kingdom.

=== Downloadable Content ===
Overcooked 2 includes downloadable content introducing additional levels, chefs, and recipes. New environments and gameplay adjustments are part of these additions.

== Development ==
Overcooked 2 was released on Nintendo Switch, PlayStation 4, Windows, and Xbox One platforms on August 7, 2018. It was developed by Team17 alongside Ghost Town Games, and published by Team17. It was announced a month prior, at E3 2018. Atop the base game, the developers created cosmetic add-on content, such as a platypus character costume exclusive to the Nintendo Switch release and a pack of other character costumes as pre-order bonus.

=== Process ===
The development of Overcooked 2 utilized a "laundry list" of ideas previously cut from the first game due to time and budget constraints. Ghost Town Games described their process as "psychological experimentation," studying player behavior to ensure levels were built around distinct elements like "pinch points" or player separation. To address issues where players were left idle during map transitions, they introduced a throwing mechanic to facilitate faster cooperative play. Additionally, the team partnered with Team17, utilizing 15 additional developers to implement online multiplayer and provide technical polish that the original two-person team could not achieve alone.

=== All You Can Eat ===
Overcooked: All You Can Eat is a compilation game containing both Overcooked and Overcooked 2. It includes a remastered version of Overcooked, utilizing the Overcooked 2 game engine, as well as all downloadable content released for both games. All You Can Eat first released as launch titles for the PlayStation 5 and Xbox Series X/S on November 12, 2020, and later released on Nintendo Switch, PlayStation 4, Windows, and Xbox One on March 23, 2021, and Google Stadia on May 5, 2022.

== Reception ==
Reception

Aggregate scores
Aggregator	Score
Metacritic	PC: 81/100; NS: 81/100; PS4: 81/100; XONE: 83/100
OpenCritic	87% recommend

Review scores
Publication	Score
Destructoid	9/10
Eurogamer	Recommended
Game Informer	8/10
GameRevolution	9/10}
GameSpot	8/10
GamesRadar+	4/5
Hardcore Gamer	3/5
Nintendo Life	8/10
PC Gamer (US)	78/100
Push Square	8/10
USgamer	3.5/5
VentureBeat	85/100
VideoGamer.com	8/10

Overcooked 2 received "generally favorable" reviews, according to review aggregator website Metacritic. Fellow review aggregator OpenCritic assessed that the game received strong approval, being recommended by 87% of critics. Several reviewers noted that while it did not feel like a significant evolution of the formula established by Overcooked!, it was a strong sequel.

Jordan Devore of Destructoid called Overcooked 2 "one of the best co-op titles around" while praising the dynamic level design and frantic gameplay while taking minor issue with the basic recipes and a lack of snappy feel in the Nintendo Switch port. Johnny Chiodini of Eurogamer recommended the title, writing, "Overcooked 2 may be more of an improved recipe than a completely new menu, but it remains an excellent sequel and a delightful co-op experience", and praised the increased difficulty. In comparing the title with its predecessor, Andrew Reiner of Game Informer praised the title for its online play and for being less frustrating due to more forgiving scoring and level gating. Mitch Vogel of Nintendo Life and Stephen Tailby of Push Square praised the improvements in presentation and performance the game made over its predecessor.

Michael Leri of GameRevolution gave the game a 9 out of 10 and praised the game's ability to consistently remain fresh with teamwork-rewarding cooperative gameplay, dynamic level mechanics, and soundtrack. Kallie Plagge of GameSpot praised the throwing mechanic, writing, "The new throwing mechanic, too, adds a new dimension to both strategy and the inevitable chaos without overcomplicating things."

Sam Loveridge of GamesRadar+ criticized the lack of visual clarity during chaotic bouts of gameplay and the sluggish controls while stating, "...when you're in the midst of a level, all of the frustrations melt away, because after all this is really an experience that you aim to have with friends." Chris Schilling of PC Gamer also criticized the chaotic interface and inconsistent level gimmicks while saying that the game felt more like an expansion than a sequel.

=== Accolades ===
Year	Award	Category	Result	Ref.
2018	Game Critics Awards	Best Family/Social Game	Won	
2018	Game Critics Awards	Best Independent Game	Nominated	
2018	Golden Joystick Awards	Best Co-operative Game	Nominated	
2018	The Game Awards 2018	Best Family Game	Won	
2018	Gamers' Choice Awards	Fan Favorite Family-Friendly Multiplayer Game	Nominated	
2018	Australian Games Awards	Family/Kids Title of the Year	Nominated	
2019	National Academy of Video Game Trade Reviewers Awards	Control Design, 2D or Limited 3D	Nominated	
2019	National Academy of Video Game Trade Reviewers Awards	Game, Franchise Family	Nominated	
2019	SXSW Gaming Awards	Excellence in Multiplayer	Nominated	
2019	15th British Academy Games Awards	British Game	Nominated	
2019	15th British Academy Games Awards	Family	Nominated	
2019	15th British Academy Games Awards	Multiplayer	Nominated	
2019	Italian Video Game Awards	Best Family Game	Nominated	
2019	Develop:Star Awards	Game of the Year	Won	
2019	The Independent Game Developers' Association Awards	Best Social Game	Nominated	
2019	British Academy Children's Awards	Game	Nominated	
