= State of Decay 2 =

2018 video game

- Developer: Undead Labs
- Publisher: Xbox Game Studios
- Producers: Jesse Dunne; Patrick Hooley; Dacey Willoughby
- Designer: Geoffrey Card
- Programmers: Ben Scott; Chris Willoughby; Jason Hail
- Artist: Doug Williams
- Composers: Jesper Kyd; dreissk
- Series: State of Decay
- Engine: Unreal Engine 4
- Platforms: Windows; Xbox One
- Release: May 22, 2018
- Genre: Survival
- Modes: Single-player, multiplayer

State of Decay 2 is a 2018 action-adventure survival video game developed by Undead Labs and published by Xbox Game Studios. The game is a sequel to State of Decay and was released for Windows and Xbox One on May 22, 2018. Players are tasked with building a community, managing resources and surviving against the horde of zombies.

State of Decay 2 received mixed reviews from critics, who praised its difficulty, musical score and combat, but criticized the technical issues and the lack of depth in the survival and management mechanics. The game had over 10 million players by August 2021.

An updated version, State of Decay 2: Juggernaut Edition, was released on May 22, 2020 and overhauled the graphics and added a map. A sequel, State of Decay 3, was announced at Xbox's 2020 Games Showcase and is in development.

== Gameplay ==
State of Decay 2 is a zombie survival game, with an emphasis on scavenging for items, in which gameplay is experienced from a third-person view. The game is set in an open world environment and features cooperative gameplay with up to three other players. The player can choose from several locations to build a base, then reinforce and improve it with facilities like watchtowers, gardens, sleeping quarters, kitchens, workshops, and medical bays, to help keep survivors safe and healthy.

Part of the game is balancing the use of resources: food, medicine, ammo, construction materials, and fuel. They can be obtained by scavenging or trading with non-player characters. The player can interact with survivors outside of their group: trading with them, helping them or recruiting them. Only one survivor can be controlled at a time, though the player can ask an AI-controlled survivor to accompany them, and in certain missions, one or more AI-controlled survivors will accompany the player. Cooperative multiplayer is also available allowing to players to recruit a friend to temporarily join their game to assist them with objectives.

Each character has a fixed set of "traits" which give them advantages or flaws (such as tiring out more easily, or improving a certain skill faster). A crucial part of gameplay is working around a survivor’s disadvantages, as even flawed traits can sometimes lead to an advantageous hero bonus when the player manages to increase that survivor’s standing in the community. Except for the story-related characters, most characters can be assigned to survivor groups and be recruited. Each character also has a morale parameter, affected by game events (a near death experience, death of another character, or having accomplished a difficult task). These attitudes can affect their behaviors, sometimes requiring player intervention.

Zombies are the main threat in the game. They respawn infinitely (unless the player establishes an outpost, which prevents spawns in their vicinity), are attracted to noise, and are capable of sprinting nearly as fast as the characters. The player can choose to confront them directly, use stealth to sneak past them, or divert them using items like firecrackers. Similarly to the first game, there are special types of zombies, such as the animal-like "Ferals" or the tank-like "Juggernauts", that are more dangerous than regular zombies in one-on-one confrontations. Besides walking, the player has access to several types of cars, each with its own characteristics like maneuverability and speed. All vehicles can be damaged and destroyed when running over zombies or hitting obstacles, though, they can be repaired with toolkits which can be manufactured at the player's base or found while scavenging.

== Development and release ==
State of Decay 2 is developed by Undead Labs and published by Microsoft Studios. It was developed using Unreal Engine 4. The game was announced on June 13, 2016, at Microsoft's E3 Xbox briefing, and initially scheduled to be released in 2017 for Windows 10 and the Xbox One. At Microsoft's E3 2017 Xbox briefing, it was announced that State of Decay 2 would release in Spring 2018. The game would be available to play at no cost to Xbox Game Pass subscribers at its release. When Xbox Live Gold became "Game Pass Core" in September 2023, the game's "Juggernaut Edition" became free for the service as part of the 36 games originally put out

State of Decay was being sold as an Xbox Play Anywhere title, as well as cross-play support between Windows 10 and Xbox players.

The Collector's Edition was also released. The set includes a SteelBook case, zombie mask, a human brain SteelBook stand, an iron-on patch with the game's logo, and thumb drive with 4GB capacity – in the shape of a severed human thumb.

=== Downloadable content ===
On September 12, 2018, the Daybreak downloadable content was released. This DLC pack added a game mode in which the objective is to protect an objective whilst facing waves of increasingly difficult enemies. Rewards earned within the Daybreak game mode can be used within the standard game mode allowing access to exclusive gear and characters. On June 11, 2019, a new expansion pack for the game, Heartland, was released, featuring new missions, characters and new enemy types. The expansion is set in Trumbull Valley, the setting of the first game.

On March 13, 2020, the Juggernaut Edition was released as both a standalone game and as a free update to people who already had the original game. This version primarily featured a graphical overhaul and different lighting schemes, along with a new map named Providence Ridge, a former logging town with much more pronounced elevation changes and twisty roads.

On August 2, 2021, a new feature named Plague Territory was added. Along with new added features such as the ability to add a sidearm, Plague Territory now enables plague hearts to "claim" nearby buildings and bases in its vicinity. These areas have a higher population of plague zombies. Bases and outposts within plague territory cannot be claimed until the plague heart controlling the area is eradicated.

On September 1, 2021, the Homecoming Update was released and features a host of quality of life improvements (including a higher ammo count for one inventory slot, a revamped gun HUD, and vehicles now keep their headlights on after exiting to illuminate dark areas) along with a new playable map Trumbull Valley, remastered from the original game.

== Reception ==
Reception

Aggregate score
Aggregator	Score
Metacritic	PC: 69/100; XONE: 66/100

Review scores
Publication	Score
Destructoid	8/10
Electronic Gaming Monthly	7.5/10
Eurogamer	Avoid
Game Informer	6.5/10
GameRevolution	3/5
GameSpot	5/10
GamesRadar+	3.5/5
IGN	7.5/10
PC Gamer (US)	74/100
VideoGamer.com	6/10

State of Decay 2 received "mixed or average" reviews from critics, according to review aggregator website Metacritic.

Alessandro Barbosa of GameSpot gave State of Decay 2 a 5/10, enjoying the satisfying combat but taking issue with the lack of depth in its survival systems and the amount of bugs; he felt that "State of Decay 2 sometimes feels like a far-too-real representation of the mundane reality that comes with surviving a zombie apocalypse."

Dan Stapleton of IGN also disliked the game's bugs and lack of depth, particularly with the board-game-style management. However, he praised the combat, calling it "simple but satisfying", and the variety of zombies and the persistent fear of permanent death; he awarded it a 7.5/10.

=== Players ===
In May 2018, Microsoft announced that the game had over a million players since its release, and on June 4, 2018 that mark had exceeded 2 million players. In June 2018, State of Decay 2 exceeded 3 million players, and by August 2019 it surpassed 5 million. In August 2021, it was announced the game had surpassed 10 million players.

=== Awards ===
The game was nominated for Best Add-on/DLC for Daybreak at Gamescom 2018, and for Best Co-Operative Game and at the Xbox Game of the Year at the 2018 Golden Joystick Awards.

== Sequel ==
A sequel, State of Decay 3, was announced at Xbox's 2020 Games Showcase in July 2020.
