= Max & the Magic Marker =

2010 video game

- Developer: Press Play
- Publishers: The Games Company (Mac OS X, PC); Press Play (WiiWare), Microsoft Studios (Windows Mobile)
- Engine: Unity
- Platforms: Wii (WiiWare), Windows, Mac OS X, Windows Mobile, iOS, Nintendo DS, PlayStation 3
- Release: January 22, 2010: WiiWare; PAL: January 22, 2010; NA: March 8, 2010; JP: April 13, 2010 Windows, Mac OS X; NA: February 8, 2010 Windows Mobile October 16, 2010 iOS March 25, 2011 Remastered August 30, 2017 Nintendo DS; EU: July 30, 2011; NA: November 8, 2011 PlayStation Network; EU: September 28, 2011; NA: November 1, 2011
- Genre: Platform
- Mode: Single-player

Max & the Magic Marker is a platform game released for WiiWare, Nintendo DS, PlayStation 3, Mac OS X, Microsoft Windows, iOS, and Windows Mobile. It was developed by Press Play. The Wii version was ported to Japan and published by Marvelous Entertainment under the name Rakugaki Hero (らくがき☆ヒーロー, Rakugaki☆Hīrō) on April 13, 2010.

The protagonist is a boy named Max, who draws a monster with a special magic marker that he happened to come across. The monster comes to life, invades Max's drawings and begins wreaking havoc in them. Max must chase and get rid of the monster, with the help of the magic marker.

== Gameplay ==
Max & the Magic Marker is a platform game with gameplay elements similar to Crayon Physics where the magic marker is controlled by the mouse and is used to create physical objects such as platforms and boxes to assist Max in his adventure. The Magic Marker is used by the player to create bridges, platforms and heavy objects to help Max cross caverns, rise up on moving objects, or be propelled in the air via a seesaw.

== Reception ==
Reception

Aggregate scores
Aggregator	Score
GameRankings	(PC) 77% (iPhone) 76% (iPad, Wii) 75% (PS3) 66% (DS) 50%
Metacritic	(Wii, iPad) 76/100 (iPhone) 75/100 (PC) 71/100 (PS3) 69/100

Review scores
Publication	Score
Destructoid	6/10
Eurogamer	8/10 (Wii) 7/10
Game Informer	(Wii) 7/10
GamePro	(PC) 2.5/5
IGN	7/10 (iPhone) 6.5/10 (WinM) 5.5/10
MacLife	(Mac) 4.5/5
Macworld	(Mac) 3.5/5
Nintendo Life	(Wii) 8/10
Official Nintendo Magazine	(Wii) 84% (DS) 50%
PlayStation Official Magazine – UK	(PS3) 8/10
PC Gamer (UK)	(PC) 81%
Pocket Gamer	4/5
Push Square	(PS3) 8/10
TouchArcade	(iOS) 3.5/5
411Mania	(PC) 8/10
Teletext GameCentral	(Wii) 8/10

The Wii and iOS versions received "generally favorable reviews", while the PC version and Gold Edition received "average" reviews, according to the review aggregation website Metacritic.

GameZone gave the PC version a score of 7.5 out of 10, saying, "While I enjoyed playing Max & The Magic Marker on the PC, the overall experience felt cheapened by the fact it controlled better on the Wii and was priced higher than it should have been." Edge gave the Wii version a score of seven out of ten, saying, "Tight ink limitations force creative solutions, but once learnt, certain tricks undermine the action."

Common Sense Media gave the PC version all five stars, saying, "For less experienced gamers, the jumping feels far more difficult than necessary and adds a frustrating element to an otherwise very enjoyable game. But for those who are platform-puzzle experts, the draw-your-own-solution aspect of the game creates a refreshing change." 411Mania gave the same PC version eight out of ten, saying, "Max & the Magic Marker feels like 'Crayon Physics Deluxe: Deluxe'. The physics and drawing are spot on and it has a great art style. One of the most enjoyable games with a little boy with a giant orange mohawk as the protagonist that I have ever played!" Teletext GameCentral gave the Wii version eight out of ten, calling it "A clever mix of World of Goo and Drawn to Life that makes good use of the Wii and your own imagination."

== Sequel ==
A sequel, entitled Max: The Curse of Brotherhood, was released for download for Xbox One on December 20, 2013. Xbox 360 and Microsoft Windows versions were also announced, and released on May 21, 2014.
