= Possibility Space =

Video game studio

- Type: Private
- Industry: Video games
- Founded: 2021
- Founder: Jeff Strain; Annie Delisi Strain
- Defunct: 2024
- Headquarters: New Orleans, Louisiana, United States
- Owner: Prytania Media Corp
- Website: possibility.co

Possibility Space was a video game development studio founded in 2021 by Jeff Strain and a team of game and media industry veterans. Its primary offices were in New Orleans and had employees from several different regions. The studio was closed in 2024 without having released a single game.

== History ==
In a press release announcing the studio's launch, Strain said, “We felt this was the right time to create something new—a studio built from the ground up to embrace evolving needs and perspectives for both players and developers. […] Possibility Space [is] a modern kind of game studio, where we are creating a joyful game that’s been my dream for many years.”

The studio attempted to hire and mentor people from "underserved and overlooked communities and backgrounds".

In an interview with IGN, Strain said the studio is developing a AAA title.

On April 12, 2024, Strain fired the entire staff of Possibility Space via email, announcing the closure of the studio and cutting off employee access to resources without warning. Strain blamed "internal leaks" for the studio's closure.
