= Press Play (company) =

Danish video game developer

Press Play ApS
- Type: Subsidiary
- Industry: Video games
- Founded: 2006; 20 years ago
- Founders: Ole Teglbjærg; Rune Dittmer; Mikkel Thorsted
- Defunct: 10 March 2016; 10 years ago
- Fate: Closed by Microsoft Studios Brand; acquired by Flashbulb Games
- Successor: Flashbulb Games
- Headquarters: Copenhagen, Denmark
- Owner: Microsoft (2012–2016)
- Parent: Microsoft Studios (2012–2016)
- Website: pressplay.dk

Press Play ApS was a Danish video game development studio based in Copenhagen, Denmark. Over the course of its 10-year lifespan from 2006 to 2016, Press Play released five titles, including Max & the Magic Marker, Max: The Curse of Brotherhood, and Kalimba.

== History ==
Press Play was formed by Ole Teglbjærg, Rune Dittmer, and Mikkel Thorsted in Copenhagen in 2006. The three formed the studio after graduating from Roskilde University. They initially did contract work and internet advertising in order to fund game development. Their first game was platformer Max & the Magic Marker.

In 2012, the studio was acquired by Microsoft and made part of its Microsoft Studios portfolio. Under Microsoft, Press Play was able to expand its team and develop Max: The Curse of the Brotherhood as a reimagining of its original game. It also developed co-op platformer Kalimba, which was nominated for a BAFTA Games Award for best original property in 2015.

In 2015, the studio polled the gaming community to choose its next project. Project Knoxville, a third-person multiplayer action game, was selected over Project Karoo and Project Dwarka. The original concept for Deep Rock Galactic from Ghost Ship Games was developed at this time.

Years later, Teglbjærg would recall that after Microsoft had acquired Minecraft developer Mojang Studios in 2014, Press Play lost many of the resources and much of the support it had under Microsoft.

=== Flashbulb Games ===
On 7 March 2016, Microsoft announced it would close Press Play and cancel Knoxville. The studio had more than 35 employees at the time.

After closing, the founders of Press Play formed a new studio, called Flashbulb Games, in April 2016. In November, the new studio announced it had acquired Press Play's library of games to republish Kalimba, Tentacles: Enter the Mind, and Max: The Curse of Brotherhood under the Flashbulb name. The new company received funding from Nordisk Games.

Flashbulb went on to release Trailmakers, a sandbox vehicle building simulator, in 2018. It went on to have five million players across multiple platforms. It released the multiplayer brawler game Rubber Bandits in 2021. In November, Nordisk acquired 100% ownership of the company. Trailmakers: Pioneers, a major update of the original game, was released in 2025.

== Games ==
Title	Year	Platform(s)									
Title	Year	Android	iOS	Mac OS	Nintendo DS	PSN	Wii	Microsoft Windows	Windows Phone	Xbox 360	Xbox One
Max & the Magic Marker	2010	No	Yes	Yes	Yes	Yes	Yes	Yes	Yes	No	No
Tentacles: Enter the Dolphin	2012	Yes	Yes	No	No	No	No	No	Yes	No	No
Max: The Curse of Brotherhood	2013	No	No	No	No	Yes	No	Yes	No	Yes	Yes
Tentacles: Enter the Mind	2014	Yes	Yes	No	No	No	No	Yes	Yes	No	No
Kalimba	2014	No	Yes	Yes	No	No	No	Yes	No	No	Yes
Knoxville	Cancelled	No	No	No	No	No	No	No	No	No	Yes
Dwarka	Cancelled	No	No	No	No	No	No	No	No	No	Yes
Karoo	Cancelled	No	No	No	No	No	No	No	No	No	Yes
