= State of Decay =

- Genre: Survival horror
- Developer: Undead Labs
- Publishers: Xbox Game Studios (SOD1 & SOD2); Undead Labs (SOD3)
- Platforms: Xbox 360; Xbox One; Microsoft Windows; Xbox Series X/S; PlayStation 5
- First release: State of Decay; June 5, 2013
- Latest release: State of Decay 2 May 22, 2018

State of Decay is a series of third-person survival horror video games. The series was created by Undead Labs and published by Xbox Game Studios. To date, there are two installments in the franchise, and an upcoming third game.

== Common gameplay elements ==
State of Decay is a series of survival horror video games. All the games feature an open world environment that is infested with zombies. The core gameplay loop revolves around finding and fortifying strongholds, explore the world to rescue survivors and collect various resources such as food and equipment, and defend the base against zombie attack. The second game introduces four-player co-operative multiplayer to the franchise. Unlike many other zombie games in the market, State of Decay is not about killing zombies. Instead, the player must try to avoid them, scavenge and manage resources and interact with other survivors. According to Jeff Strain, the founder of Undead Labs, the series explores the "human element", how people interact with each other and make choices in a time of desperation and hopelessness.

== Games ==
Release timeline
2013	State of Decay
2014
2015	State of Decay: YOSE
2016
2017
2018	State of Decay 2
2019
2020	State of Decay 2: Juggernaut Edition
2021
2022
2023
2024
2025
2026
2027	State of Decay 3

=== State of Decay (2013) ===
State of Decay is the debut title for Undead Labs. Originally announced as "Class3", it was released for the Xbox Live Arcade for the Xbox 360, and Microsoft Windows in June 2013. It quickly became a commercial success, selling 250,000 copies in 2 days. An enhanced version of the game, titled State of Decay: Year-One Survival Edition (YOSE), which introduced new weapons, vehicles and characters, was released in 2015 for Windows and Xbox One.

=== State of Decay 2 (2018) ===
State of Decay 2 was the follow-up to the first game. It introduces a four-player cooperative mode, which was scrapped in the first game due to limited resources, to the franchise. It was released for the Xbox One in May 2018. While the critical reception to the game was mixed, the game was the best-selling video game in the US in its month of release, with launch sales doubling that of the first game. Enabled by the success of Xbox Game Pass, the game had more than 5 million players in 2019. An expansion, Heartland, as well as several pieces of downloadable content, were released for the game. An enhanced version of the game named the "Juggernaut Edition" which added numerous quality-of-life improvements to the game, was released in March 2020.

=== State of Decay 3 (2027) ===
Following the release of State of Decay 2, Microsoft fully acquired Undead Labs, making it a first-party studio. It is working on the third installment in the franchise, which is set to be released for PlayStation 5, Windows and Xbox Series X/S in 2027.

== Cancelled project ==
Class4 was originally intended to be a follow-up to the first game. It was envisioned to be a massively multiplayer online role-playing game. However, the concept was abandoned following the success of State of Decay, as fans of the game were requesting a more expanded and polished sequel instead of a game that was drastically different.
