= Virginia (video game) =

2016 first-person mystery video game

- Developer: Variable State
- Publisher: 505 Games
- Directors: Jonathan Burroughs; Terry Kenny
- Producer: Carlos Aguilar
- Programmer: Kieran Keegan
- Artists: Terry Kenny; Mikael Persson; Abby Roebuck; Steve James Brown; Matt Wilde; Stephen Brown
- Writers: Jonathan Burroughs; Terry Kenny; Lyndon Holland
- Composer: Lyndon Holland
- Engine: Unity
- Platforms: macOS; PlayStation 4; Windows; Xbox One
- Release: September 22, 2016
- Genre: Adventure
- Mode: Single-player

Virginia is a 2016 first-person mystery adventure video game developed by Variable State and published by 505 Games. The game follows graduate FBI special agent Anne Tarver as she investigates her first case: the disappearance of a boy in rural Virginia.

The game was directed by Jonathan Burroughs and Terry Kenny, with music composed by Lyndon Holland. Burroughs, Kenny and Holland co-wrote the script.

The game was first announced in July 2014 and originally slated for release in 2015. A game prototype was showcased at the 2014 Future of StoryTelling summit and at the EGX Leftfield Collection that year. On August 30, 2016, it was announced that video game publisher 505 Games would be publishing the game. A game demo was released on Steam to coincide with the announcement.

Virginia released on September 22, 2016, for macOS, PlayStation 4, Windows, and Xbox One.

== Gameplay ==
Players experience the game from the first-person perspective. The game features a large cast of animated characters, such as the player's FBI partner Maria Halperin.

Virginia is a first-person mystery thriller adventure game that takes place in a fictionalised Virginia in 1992. Players take on the role of Anne Tarver, a graduate FBI special agent who is assigned a partner, special agent Maria Halperin. Much of the game involves the player, as Tarver, in the company of the non-playable Halperin, travelling between locations, interacting with other characters and with objects in the environments. Scenes transition using real-time cinematic editing, with cuts and dissolves occurring as dictated by the story, to propel events forward and to juxtapose moments for dramatic effect.

== Premise ==
Set in the last days of summer 1992, the player takes the role of Anne Tarver, a rookie FBI special agent. She is assigned to investigate the disappearance of a missing boy, Lucas Fairfax, in the fictional town of Kingdom, Virginia, paired with Maria Halperin, an experienced but discredited agent. Anne's supervisor instructs her to secretly monitor Maria for any signs of distrustfulness.

Anne finds Lucas had an interest in photography and finds a nearby cave where he may have hung out. After the two narrowly escape a minor cave-in, they return to the site the next day when Maria is accosted by a young teen who takes a locket she wears containing a photo of her mother, Judith Ortega, who had also been an FBI agent. They arrest the teen, and among his possessions include some LSD, which Anne keeps a small sample for herself. As they continue to investigate, they find some of Lucas's photos that point to the abandoned observatory in town seems to be a focal point, and are denied entry when forces from the local Air Force base arrive to block access while other townspeople, including Lucas' father and the mayor arrive. Back at FBI headquarters, Anne investigates Judith and learns she had been discredited by the agency for unusual investigation methods, similar to Maria.

As they are getting gas, Maria inadvertently tips over Anne's bag and finds the secret files on her. She drives off, leaving Anne to fend for herself. She decides to search for Maria's locket, then returns to her apartment. With it empty, she enters the place through lockpicking and finds a special room that includes numerous case files from Judith's time at the agency, revealing that she had been investigating Anne's father, having discovered a conspiracy within the FBI. Anne finds Maria, returns her locket, and throws away the instructions to track Maria. In return, Maria gives her the envelope that Anne had kept the sample of LSD in, as Maria had been spying on her too.

The next morning, both are arrested and jailed by the local police, Air Force generals, and the FBI director to keep them out of the way. Anne has a vision of a future whereby ratting out on Maria would lead her to continue along a line of similar exposures within the agency, before she turns a protégé into similar tracks. Opting not to follow this route, she assures Maria has her locket and decides to take the LSD, a method that Judith had recommended at times. In her vision, she witnesses a strange ritual at the observatory by key people in Kingdom as well as the FBI director; she then briefly experiences each of them at their weakest, including when Lucas's father was caught by Lucas having an affair. She then recalls Maria's own past, seeing her bed-ridden father after becoming an FBI agent, and him given her a key to a locked box. The key had broken while she opened it, but the contents she considered too dangerous that she burned them immediately, keeping the broken key as the reminder.

The two are released the next day. Having come to a point of catharsis from the drug-induced vision, Anne leaves the broken key behind as she and Maria return home. On the way out, they spot a young man, similar to Lucas, hitchhiking his way out of town.

== Development ==
Virginia is the first game developed by Variable State, a British independent game developer founded by Jonathan Burroughs and Terry Kenny, former developers with DeepMind Technologies. Lyndon Holland joined the project early in development in the role of composer and sound designer and is responsible for creating the entirety of the game's music and Foley. Virginia is developed in the Unity game engine.

Variable State is a virtual studio; all of the team are remote workers and coordinate each morning using videotelephony.

Upon forming Variable State, Burroughs and Kenny initially pursued a range of game ideas, but met with frustration, deeming early concepts to be too ambitious. Progress resumed after the developers played Brendon Chung's Thirty Flights of Loving for the first time and found themselves inspired by its creative use of cinematic editing in the context of real-time gameplay. In combination the team's shared interest in American television and films of the 1990s, in particular FBI noir productions such as Twin Peaks, The X-Files, and Silence of the Lambs, this gave the developers a stepping off point from which they could fashion an original story.

The developers took the unusual decision to omit dialogue from the game. This was due to Burroughs' and Kenny's desire to keep the team small and agile and keep the focus on the cinematic editing, a technique that would require experimentation to get right. Spoken dialogue was perceived to be risky because of how many factors were involved in achieving quality; the writing, the choice of actors, the performance and the dialogue systems themselves. Instead of dialogue, Virginia conveys its story through the physical performances of its large cast of characters. The large animation workload required Variable State engage the help of Niamh Herrity and Aoife Doyle, Irish animators who run Pink Kong Studios animation company.

During development, Variable State expanded the Virginia development team to include programmer Kieran Keegan, the lead programmer on Kitty Powers' Matchmaker. Additional contributors included technical artist Matt Wilde, 3D artist Stephen Brown and animators Abby Roebuck, Steve James Brown and Mikael Persson. 3D artist Wayne Peters assisted in an outsourcing capacity.

== Reception ==
Reception

Aggregate score
Aggregator	Score
Metacritic	PC: 74/100; XONE: 80/100; PS4: 77/100

Review scores
Publication	Score
Edge	8/10
Game Informer	93/100
IGN	85/100
Polygon	9/10
The Telegraph	5/5

On Metacritic, Virginia holds a score of 80% on Xbox One, 77% on PlayStation 4 and 74% on PC.

The Daily Telegraph awarded it 5 stars, saying "It is the game that titles like Dear Esther, Gone Home and Firewatch have hinted at, but in a way that evolves the interactive narrative form way beyond anything we’ve seen before." TIME awarded it 4.5/5, saying "what gorgeous, reverberant moments there are in this game, empowered by its absent words and explanations." Game Informer awarded it a score of 9.25/10, saying "Virginia is a taut thriller that strikes a fine balance between storytelling and interactivity in a way that narrative-driven first-person adventure games have not accomplished since their inception."

PC Gamer awarded it a score of 72%, saying "A slick cinematic thriller, but interaction is limited and the story loses focus in the final act." Caitlin Cooke of Destructoid agreed, saying the game "sadly sacrifices the player's ability to absorb what's happening around them for the sake of cinematics" and that the story "falls apart towards the end".

== Accolades ==
Following its release, Virginia was nominated for several awards, with the writers of the game receiving the award for Best Writing in a Video Game at the 2017 Writers' Guild Awards and Virginia's composer, Lyndon Holland, receiving the BAFTA for Music at the British Academy Games Awards in 2017.

TIME, The Washington Post and The Telegraph included Virginia in their respective lists of the top 10 games of 2016. Mic included Virginia in a list of the 10 most underrated releases of 2016.

Year	Award	Category	Result	Ref.
2016	Fun & Serious Titanium Awards	Best Indie Game	Nominated	
2016	Fun & Serious Titanium Awards	Best Soundtrack	Nominated	
2016	Global Game Awards	Best Adventure	Nominated	
2016	Global Game Awards	Best Audio	Nominated	
2016	Global Game Awards	Best Indie	Nominated	
2016	Unity Awards 2016	Best Desktop / Console Game	Nominated	
2017	Independent Games Festival	Best Audio	Nominated	
2017	Independent Games Festival	Excellence in Narrative	Nominated	
2017	Independent Games Festival	Excellence in Visual Art	Nominated	
2017	Independent Games Festival	The Nuovo Award for innovation	Nominated	
2017	Writers' Guild Awards 2017	Best Writing in a Video Game	Won	
2017	13th British Academy Games Awards	British Game	Nominated	
2017	13th British Academy Games Awards	Debut Game	Nominated	
2017	13th British Academy Games Awards	Music	Won	
2017	Develop Awards 2017	New Games IP	Nominated	
2017	Develop Awards 2017	Animation	Nominated	
2017	Develop Awards 2017	Visual Design	Nominated	
2017	Develop Awards 2017	Music Design	Nominated	
2017	Develop Awards 2017	Creative Outsourcer (Pink Kong Studios)	Nominated	
