= State of Decay 3 =

Upcoming survival horror video game

- Developer: Undead Labs
- Publisher: Undead Labs
- Series: State of Decay
- Engine: Unreal Engine 5
- Platforms: PlayStation 5; Windows; Xbox Series X/S
- Release: WW: 2027
- Genre: Survival horror
- Modes: Single-player; Multiplayer

State of Decay 3 is an upcoming survival horror video game developed and published by Undead Labs. It is the third main installment in the State of Decay series and a sequel to State of Decay 2 (2018). The game was announced during the Xbox Games Showcase in 2020. Its first gameplay trailer was shown at the Xbox Games Showcase in June 2026. It is scheduled for release in 2027 for PlayStation 5, Windows, and Xbox Series X/S.

== Gameplay ==
State of Decay 3 is an open-world survival game in which players control a community of survivors after a zombie apocalypse. Players build and maintain settlements, scavenge for resources, fight zombies, recruit survivors, and make decisions about how their community develops.

The game can be played alone or in online shared world cooperative multiplayer for up to four players. In the shared world mode, players are planned to be able to build facilities, expand settlements, move story progress forward, and affect the same saved world. Players may also claim multiple settlements, with up to three bases that can be expanded over time.

The game introduces Plague Nests, which are dynamic enemy hubs that build on the Plague Hearts system from State of Decay 2. According to creative director Kevin Patzelt, Plague Nests can change their behaviour and react to player actions. The game world is planned to be larger than previous entries; Patzelt said that the playable area is "about four times the size of a single State of Decay 2 map" and that players will be able to access the entire map from the start.

Combat includes melee and ranged encounters with zombies. The sequel adds separate quick and power melee attacks, expanded enemy behaviour, and weapon crafting elements based on repurposed or modified materials. Scavenging remains a core part of the game, with dangerous areas such as Plague Nests offering greater risks and rewards.

== Development and release ==
State of Decay 3 was first announced by Microsoft and Undead Labs during the Xbox Games Showcase in 2020. Following several years with limited public updates, Undead Labs showed the game's first gameplay trailer at the Xbox Games Showcase in June 2026. In April 2026, Undead Labs revealed that the 2020 trailer only showcased the initial concept of the game. Developers said that they did not want to announce the game at that point, and only did so at the urging of Microsoft, and at the time the trailer released development on the game had not really began. Studio head Philip Holt said that, at that point, the entirety of the game "was in a Word document". Features shown in the trailer are not included in the final game.

The game is being developed in Unreal Engine 5. Patzelt said that the 2026 gameplay trailer used in-game footage rather than computer-generated imagery, and that the studio planned to show more of the game's systems after the initial gameplay reveal.

Before the gameplay reveal, Undead Labs had begun an alpha testing phase for selected players. Patzelt said in June 2026 that the studio was expanding alpha and beta testing over time.

The game is scheduled for release in 2027 for Windows, Xbox Series X and Series S, and PlayStation 5. It is planned to support Xbox Play Anywhere on Xbox consoles and PC. State of Decay 3 was originally marketed as a day‑one Xbox Game Pass title during its early Xbox Games Showcase reveals, but later reporting indicated that this is no longer contractually required. In September 2026, Matt Booty, Head of Xbox Game Studios, announced on the official Xbox Wire blog that Microsoft had divested Undead Labs. Under the terms of the transaction, all shares were sold back to the studio's founder, returning Undead Labs to independent operation. As part of the agreement, Undead Labs re-acquired the publishing rights to the game across all platforms from Xbox Game Studios. However, State of Decay 3 and other future releases from the studio are set to remain available on Xbox Game Pass as day-one catalog additions.
