= Jeff Strain =

Video game designer

Jeff Strain is an American entrepreneur, CEO, and founder of three independent video game studios, most recently Possibility Space.

In 2000, Strain cofounded ArenaNet, where he worked as an executive producer and programmer on the popular online roleplaying game Guild Wars. ArenaNet was acquired by NCSoft in 2002, and Strain went on to become President of Product Development for the company's North American and European operations.

Strain left NCSoft in 2009 and founded Undead Labs, creators of zombie survival series State of Decay. Microsoft acquired Undead Labs in 2018, and Jeff Strain left the studio shortly after in 2019. As of August 2021, State of Decay 2 had over 10 million players worldwide.

In August of 2021, Strain published an open letter, calling for full unionization in the games industry.

In 2021, Jeff founded Possibility Space, a distributed studio based in New Orleans, LA. According to a press release, Strain and his team were working on "a joyful game that's been [his] dream for many years." In an interview, Strain said the game would be a AAA title. On April 12, 2024, Strain closed the studio citing "cancellation of the publishing relationship" and an as-yet-unpublished article from Kotaku reporter Ethan Gach, which had also allegedly prompted the closure of Crop Circle Games, a related studio and part of Strain's umbrella corporation, Prytania Media, a few days earlier.

Strain previously worked as a lead programmer on Blizzard Entertainment's MMORPG World of Warcraft; he also created the StarCraft campaign editor and worked on Diablo and Warcraft III.
