= 2016 in esports =

List of events in 2016 in eSports (also known as professional gaming).

== Calendar of events ==
=== Leagues ===
Date	Game	Event	Location	Winner
January 14–March 18	League of Legends	2016 Spring European League of Legends Championship Series (EU LCS) (regular season)	EU LCS Studio – Berlin, Germany	G2 Esports
January 16–March 20	League of Legends	2016 Spring North American League of Legends Championship Series (NA LCS) Spring Split (regular season)	NA LCS Studio – Los Angeles, United States	Immortals
January 14–March 27	League of Legends	2016 League of Legends Master Series (LMS) Spring Split (regular season)	Garena e-Sports Stadium – Taipei, Taiwan	ahq e-Sports Club
January 14–April 10	League of Legends	2016 League of Legends Pro League (LPL) Spring Split (regular season)	Shanghai, China	Qiao Gu Reapers; Royal Never Give Up
January 13–April 9	League of Legends	2016 League of Legends Champions Korea (LCK) Spring Split (regular season)	Yongsan I'Park Mall e-Sports stadium – Seoul, South Korea	ROX Tigers

=== Tournaments ===
Date	Game	Event	Location	Winner(s)
January 7–10	Smite	Smite World Championship 2016	National Center for Civil and Human Rights – Atlanta, United States	Epsilon eSports
January 15–17	Super Smash Bros. Melee; Super Smash Bros. for Wii U Super Smash Bros.	GENESIS 3	San Jose Convention Center (January 15–16); City National Civic (January 17); San Jose, United States	Armada (SSB Melee); ZeRo (SSB Wii U) wario (SSB)
January 29–February 2	Counter-Strike: Global Offensive; StarCraft II: Legacy of the Void	Intel Extreme Masters Season X – Taipei	Taipei World Trade Center – Taipei, Taiwan	The Mongolz (CS:GO) sOs (Jin Air Green Wing) (SC2)
January 30–31	Killer Instinct	Killer Instinct World Cup 2016	Fountain Bleu – San Antonio, United States	Rico Suave
March 2–6	Dota 2	Shanghai Major 2016	Mercedes-Benz Arena – Shanghai, China	Team Secret
March 4–6	Counter-Strike: Global Offensive; League of Legends; StarCraft II: Legacy of the Void	Intel Extreme Masters Season X – World Championship	Spodek – Katowice, Poland	Fnatic (CS:GO); SK Telecom T1 (LoL); Polt (SC2)
March 29 – April 3	Counter-Strike: Global Offensive	MLG Major Championship: Columbus 2016	Nationwide Arena – Columbus, United States	Luminosity Gaming
April 2–17	League of Legends	EU LCS Spring Playoffs	Rotterdam, Netherlands	G2 Esports
April 2–17	League of Legends	NA LCS Spring Playoffs	Mandalay Bay Events Center – Las Vegas, United States	Counter Logic Gaming
April 13–23	League of Legends	LMS Spring Playoffs		Flash Wolves
April 13–23	League of Legends	LPL Spring Playoffs	Qizhong Forest Sports City Arena – Shanghai, China	Royal Never Give Up
April 13–23	League of Legends	LCK Spring Playoffs		SK Telecom T1
April 16–23	League of Legends	International Wildcard Invitational 2016	Palacio de los Deportes – Mexico City, Mexico	SuperMassive eSports
May 4–15	League of Legends	2016 Mid-Season Invitational	Shanghai Oriental Sports Center – Shanghai, China	SK Telecom T1
May 7-August 7	Rocket League	Rocket League Championship Series	Online (preliminaries); Avalon Hollywood – Los Angeles, United States (finals)	iBuyPower Cosmic
June 7–12	Dota 2	Manila Major 2016	Mall of Asia Arena – Manila, Philippines	OG
July 5–10	Counter-Strike: Global Offensive	ESL One Cologne 2016	Lanxess Arena – Cologne, Germany	SK Gaming
July 15–17	various fighting games	Evolution 2016	Las Vegas Convention Center (July 15–16); Mandalay Bay Events Center (July 17); Las Vegas, United States	see main article
August 3–13	Dota 2	The International 2016	KeyArena – Seattle, United States	Wings Gaming
August 15–16	Smite; Super Smash Bros. for Wii U	eGames Rio 2016	British House, Parque Lage – Jardim Botânico, Rio de Janeiro, Brazil	Ally (SSB Wii U)
September 29—October 29	League of Legends	2016 League of Legends World Championship	Bill Graham Civic Auditorium – San Francisco, United States (group stage); Chicago Theater – Chicago, United States (quarterfinals); Madison Square Garden – New York, United States (semifinals); Staples Center – Los Angeles, United States (finals)	SK Telecom 1
October 1–2	Counter-Strike: Global Offensive; Street Fighter V	ESL One New York 2016	Barclays Center – New York City, United States	Natus Vincere (CS:GO); Xiao Hai (SFV)
October 15–16	Counter-Strike: Global Offensive; League of Legends; Hearthstone	8th IeSF World Championships	Ancol Beach City Auditorium – Jakarta, Indonesia	TBD
November 4–5	Overwatch	2016 Overwatch World Cup	Anaheim Convention Center – Anaheim, United States	South Korea
December 2–3	Street Fighter V	Capcom Cup 2016	eSports Arena – Santa Ana, United States (December 2); Anaheim Convention Center – Anaheim, United States (December 3)	NuckleDu
December 7–10	Dota 2	Boston Major	Wang Theatre – Boston, United States	OG
December 10	Tekken 7: Fated Retribution	King of Iron Fist Tournament 2016 Grand Finals	Takeshiba New Pier Hall – Tokyo, Japan	Saint
December 14–18	League of Legends; Starcraft 2 Overwatch	IEM Season XI - Gyeonggi	Gyeonggi, South Korea	Innovation (SC2); Samsung Galaxy (LoL); LW Red (OW)
December 15–18	Counter-Strike: Global Offensive	ELEAGUE Major Offline Qualifier	Atlanta, United States	GODSENT, FaZe Clan, Mousesports, Optic Gaming, Team Dignitas, Team EnvyUS, Hellraisers, G2 Esports
