= Max: The Curse of Brotherhood =

2013 puzzle-platform video game

- Developers: Press Play; Flashbulb Games (PS4, NS, iOS)
- Publishers: Microsoft Studios; Wired Productions (PS4, NS); Flashbulb Games (iOS)
- Engine: Unity
- Platforms: Xbox One; Microsoft Windows; Xbox 360; PlayStation 4; Nintendo Switch; iOS
- Release: Xbox One; 20 December 2013; Microsoft Windows, Xbox 360; 21 May 2014; PlayStation 4; 8 November 2017; Nintendo Switch; 21 December 2017; iOS; 18 October 2018; Amazon Luna; 14 April 2022
- Genres: Puzzle, platformer
- Mode: Single-player

Max: The Curse of Brotherhood is a 2013 puzzle-platform video game developed by Press Play and published by Microsoft Studios. It was originally released in 2013 for Xbox One, Microsoft Windows, Xbox 360, Nintendo Switch and later on PlayStation 4. The game was announced during Microsoft's E3 2013 press event. It is a sequel to Press Play's previous work, the 2010 game Max & the Magic Marker. A sequel was planned but cancelled following the closure of Press Play in 2016.

== Story ==
Max, the protagonist of Max & the Magic Marker, arrives home from school one day and finds his younger brother Felix playing in his room and smashing his beloved toys. Being annoyed by his little brother Max searches online on the search engine website "Giggle" (a parody of Google) for a way to get rid of Felix. He immediately stumbles upon a spell which promises to make his brother disappear. Inadvertently reading the spell out loud opens up a mysterious portal from which a giant claw emerges and kidnaps his little brother Felix. Realizing the consequences of his actions, Max jumps without hesitation into the portal to rescue Felix and enters a magical and hostile world controlled by the evil lord Mustacho and his henchmen.

== Gameplay ==
In its core Max: The Curse of Brotherhood is a physics-based puzzle/platformer and set in a 2.5D environment with a free and cinematic camera. The game has 7 chapters and 20 levels in total. All levels are connected so the game feels like one long journey. Besides platforming, the gameplay twist is the magic marker which introduces a creative and open approach to how puzzles can be solved. Throughout the game the magic marker will gain different powers.

== Reception ==
Reception

Aggregate score
Aggregator	Score
Metacritic	XONE: 72/100; PS4: 67/100; NS: 73/100

Review scores
Publication	Score
Destructoid	8/10
Edge	7/10
Game Informer	6/10
GameSpot	6/10
GamesRadar+	4.5/5
GameZone	5.5/10
Hardcore Gamer	3.5/5

Max: The Curse of Brotherhood received mixed reviews on Metacritic.

GamesRadar praised the inventive and well-balanced puzzle design, gorgeous visuals and beautiful environments providing a fresh and charming experience on the platformer genre. Destructoid praised its visuals, which was considered "Pixar-esque" charming, and loved the mix of cerebral puzzles combined with thrilling action sequences in a memorable world. Edge described it as a memorable and enjoyable platformer with ingenious puzzles and steady flow of new sights. However, they remarked that the game "stretches the controls beyond their comfort zone" and criticize the limit of freedom to draw whatever and wherever you want. GameSpot loved its lush environments and attractive art design combined with an appealing story and protagonist. They found the game's puzzles initially intriguing but ultimately repetitive and predictable over the course of the game.

Game Informer wrote that the game's central conceit was a "gimmick that simply doesn't work all that well", and for that reason, they did not expect players to advance to the end of the game. They added that the Xbox One controller was not precise enough for the puzzles, though the final puzzle was praised. Kotaku did not recommend the game, which they compared to a larger version of an iPhone game. They praised the game's humor and background art, but complained that the game's drawing mechanics' use of the analog stick made it needlessly difficult at times and extended the game's length in undesirable ways. Hardcore Gamer criticized the game for not breaking any new ground and failing to utilize the features of the Kinect for the drawing mechanics, while praising its voice acting, sound effects and soundtrack. GameZone stated that it is hard to recommend the game as its mechanics could put off new players. However, they praised the visuals, calling them, "freaking gorgeous," and commended the detailed environments, which, "coupled with the brilliant lighting make it look like an interactive Pixar movie."
