= Kalimba (video game) =

2015 puzzle-platform game

- Developers: Press Play; Flashbulb Games (iOS)
- Publishers: Microsoft Studios; Flashbulb Games (iOS)
- Engine: Unity
- Platforms: Xbox One; Microsoft Windows; iOS
- Release: Xbox One; December 17, 2014; Microsoft Windows; April 22, 2015 iOS; June 30, 2017
- Genres: Puzzle, platformer
- Modes: Single-player, multiplayer

Kalimba is a puzzle-platform video game developed by Press Play and published by Microsoft Studios for the Xbox One and Windows. In the game, initially known as "Project Totem", players must move pieces of a totem pole through various levels while avoiding obstacles.

== Gameplay ==
A noble shaman on the island of Kalimba protects her people through a mystic totem pole. When an evil shaman destroys both the good shaman and the totem pole, she discovers that her spirit can control pieces of the totem and plans to use that ability to save the island's inhabitants by building a new, stronger totem pole.

The player controls two colored pieces of the totem pole simultaneously; when the player moves one piece in a given direction, the second piece copies the action. The totem pieces may pass safely through anything that matches their own color, but otherwise must avoid all enemies and pitfalls. If a piece is lost through contact with an enemy or other obstacle, both pieces are lost, but the pieces reset to the most recently passed checkpoint. As players advance, they collect items scattered throughout the level. Upon completion of the level, points are scored for each item collected, but are reduced by the number of times the pieces were lost. The completed level unlocks a totem piece that also serves to rank the player's performance in that level. Levels may be replayed in order to improve both score and time of completion.

In cooperative mode, each player controls a pair of totem pieces of the same color. Playing through a different set of levels from the single-player mode, players must work together to arrange their pieces in ways to complete the levels. Scoring and ranking are otherwise the same as the single-player version.

== Development ==
First announced in April 2014 as "Project Totem", Kalimba was developed by Press Play, a Danish gaming studio that was acquired in 2012 by Microsoft Studios. In November 2014, the name was changed to Kalimba officially and a release date of December 17, 2014 was announced for Xbox One, with a Windows PC release planned for January 2015. At the initial announcement, Press Play mentioned that the game would also be released on Xbox 360, but after the release date for Xbox One was announced, Press Play said, "while there are plans to hopefully bring Kalimba to [Xbox] 360 in the future, there's nothing concrete in the works at the moment."

In April 2015, Press Play announced the official release date of the PC version of Kalimba, which was released on Steam April 22, 2015. They further announced an update to both versions that would add two new gameplay modes along with a DLC expansion that added new single-player and co-op levels to the game. One of the new modes allows single players to speedrun the levels and compete against ghosts of other players, while the second mode introduces new challenges for co-op play. The new game modes are free to all users, and users can purchase the additional levels either individually (single-player or co-op) or in a discounted bundle; current Xbox One players can obtain the DLC at no additional charge for a limited time.

After Press Play's dissolution, Flashbulb Games purchased the entirety of its library from Microsoft; an iOS version was released on June 30, 2017.

== Reception ==
Reception

Aggregate score
Aggregator	Score
Metacritic	XONE: 81/100; PC: 81/100 iOS: 91/100

Review scores
Publication	Score
GameSpot	7/10
IGN	7.4/10

Kalimba has received generally positive reviews. Reviewers have complimented the game on its concept and the fun of playing the game cooperatively, but have said that the game's graphics and sounds are ultimately "forgettable". The game was both nominated and shortlisted for a 2015 BAFTA award in the 'Best Original Property' category.
