= Xbox Game Studios =

American video game publisher

- Logo used since 2019
- Formerly: Microsoft Games (2000–2001); Microsoft Game Studios (2001–2011); Microsoft Studios (2011–2019)
- Type: Division
- Industry: Video games
- Predecessor: Microsoft Games Group
- Founded: March 2000; 26 years ago
- Headquarters: Redmond, Washington, US
- Area served: Worldwide
- Key people: Matt Booty (interim)
- Products: See List of Xbox Game Studios video games
- Parent: Microsoft (2000–2022); Xbox (2022–present)
- Subsidiaries: See § Studios

Xbox Game Studios (previously known as Microsoft Studios, Microsoft Game Studios, and Microsoft Games) is an American video game publisher based in Redmond, Washington. It formed part of Microsoft's new Gaming division in 2022, while founded as a division of the company itself. Xbox Game Studios, alongside ZeniMax Media, Activision Blizzard, Mojang Studios, and King, are part of the Xbox division led by Asha Sharma, who is chief executive officer of the division.

The division was originally established in March 2000, spun out from Microsoft's internal Games Group, for the development and publishing of video games for Microsoft Windows. It has since expanded to include games and other interactive entertainment for the namesake Xbox platforms, other desktop operating systems, Windows Mobile and other mobile platforms, web-based portals, and other game consoles.

== History ==
=== As Microsoft Games and Microsoft Game Studios (2000–2011) ===
Microsoft Game Studios logo (2001–2011)

Early in the history of Microsoft the software company published video games like Olympic Decathlon, but Steve Ballmer reportedly persuaded Bill Gates to deemphasize them to professionalize the company's image. By the early 1990s, Microsoft published subLOGIC's Microsoft Flight Simulator and several Microsoft Entertainment Pack compilations of minigames, but was best known for MS-DOS and Microsoft Windows. In 1992, the company began increasing its focus on games. It announced Microsoft Golf for Windows, based on Access Software's Links, and expanded the games division from two to six people with the intention of commissioning more products from other developers.

Microsoft acquired FASA Interactive in 1999 for its MechWarrior game series, Access Software, and Aces Game Studio, which worked on Flight Simulator. The Games Group had also established long-term publishing deals with developers like Ensemble Studios (Age of Empires, Age of Mythology), and Digital Anvil (Starlancer). Under Microsoft, FASA Interactive was renamed FASA Studio, and Access Software became Salt Lake Games Studio.

Microsoft transitioned the Games Group into a wholly separate division named Microsoft Games around March 2000, along with other consolidation of games-related projects within Microsoft. This came alongside the public announcement of the first Xbox console, with Microsoft Games to serve as a developer and publisher of titles for both Xbox and Windows. Robbie Bach, who held executive positions in Microsoft's entertainment divisions, was named senior vice-president while Ed Fries, a member of the former Games Group and instrumental for some of its acquisitions, was named as vice-president of the new division. Shane Kim served as the division's general manager. In 2001, the division was renamed Microsoft Game Studios (MGS).

FASA Studio and Salt Lake Games Studio remained with Microsoft Game Studios. Digital Anvil and Ensemble Studios were acquired by Microsoft in 2000 and 2001, respectively. One of the first major studio acquisitions following the division's formation was Bungie in June 2000, in the midst of its development of Halo: Combat Evolved. With the acquisition, Halo, which had been planned for release on personal computers, became a Microsoft-published title as well as a launch title for the Xbox on its release in 2001. Turn 10 Studios was established in 2001 for work on the Forza series of racing games. In September 2002, Microsoft Game Studios acquired Rare, who had previously extensively developed for Nintendo platforms. In 2003, Microsoft recognized that the EA Sports label was in a far stronger position to develop sports games for the Xbox console, and among realignment steps, laid off about 78 employees within Microsoft Game Studios that were developing sports games in-house, and sold Salt Lake Games Studio, now named Indie Games to Take-Two Interactive in 2004, where it became Indie Built.

Peter Moore was named in 2003 as vice-president of Microsoft's Home and Entertainment Division, which included MGS, the Xbox division, and Microsoft's home hardware market, reporting to Bach. In addition to pulling big publishers like Electronic Arts to the Xbox platform, Moore tried to push the Xbox in Japan by courting Japanese developers with support from MGS publishing. Such games included Phantom Dust and Blinx: The Time Sweeper. Around 2004, MGS established Carbonated Games as an internal studio for the development of casual games for Microsoft's web games portal MSN Games, on the chat client MSN Messenger, and on the Xbox Live platform. Kim and Fries were instrumental for securing MGS' publishing deal with Lionhead Studios for its 2004 game Fable, which would serve as the first major role-playing game on the Xbox platform. Subsequently, in 2006, MGS acquired Lionhead Studios along with the Fable properties, as it sought to secure a Fable sequel for the upcoming Xbox 360. MGS folded the staff of Digital Anvil into the larger studio in 2005, following the release of 2003's Brute Force, and closed down the studio entirely in 2006. FASA Studio was closed three-and-a-half months after the May 2007 release of their last game, Shadowrun.

In 2007, MGS announced the opening of a European office in Reading, England, headed by general manager Phil Spencer. Moore opted to leave Microsoft in July 2007, so to move back to the San Francisco Bay area with his family and to rejoin Electronic Arts. Don Mattrick was named as his replacement as the new vice-president of the Xbox and Games Business, which included MGS. Later in 2007, Bungie amicably split from MGS to become a privately held independent company, with MGS retaining the rights to the Halo property. Bungie continued to develop two additional Halo games for MGS, Halo 3: ODST (2009) and Halo: Reach (2010). Simultaneously, MGS founded 343 Industries as an internal studio to develop future Halo games without Bungie.

In 2008, MGS disbanded Carbonated Games and announced the formation of internal studio Xbox Live Productions to develop "high-quality digital content" for Xbox Live Arcade. Microsoft as a whole announced layoffs of up to 5,000 jobs across all divisions in January 2009 due to slowing sales of personal computers as a result of the Great Recession. Within MGS, the studio had already planned to disband Ensemble Studios after the completion of Halo Wars in early 2009, while the new layoffs led MGS to also disband Aces Game Studio. Microsoft acquired Vancouver-based BigPark in May 2009, using the studio to develop some of the first games for the upcoming Kinect sensor for the Xbox 360. Later in 2009, Phil Spencer was promoted to corporate vice-president of MGS, in order to replace the retiring Shane Kim. In 2010, MGS formed a mobile gaming studio, MGS Mobile Gaming, focused on developing gaming and entertainment multimedia for Windows Phone devices. It also expanded Rare with a second studio in Digbeth, Birmingham.

=== As Microsoft Studios (2011–2019) ===
Microsoft Studios logo (2011–2019)

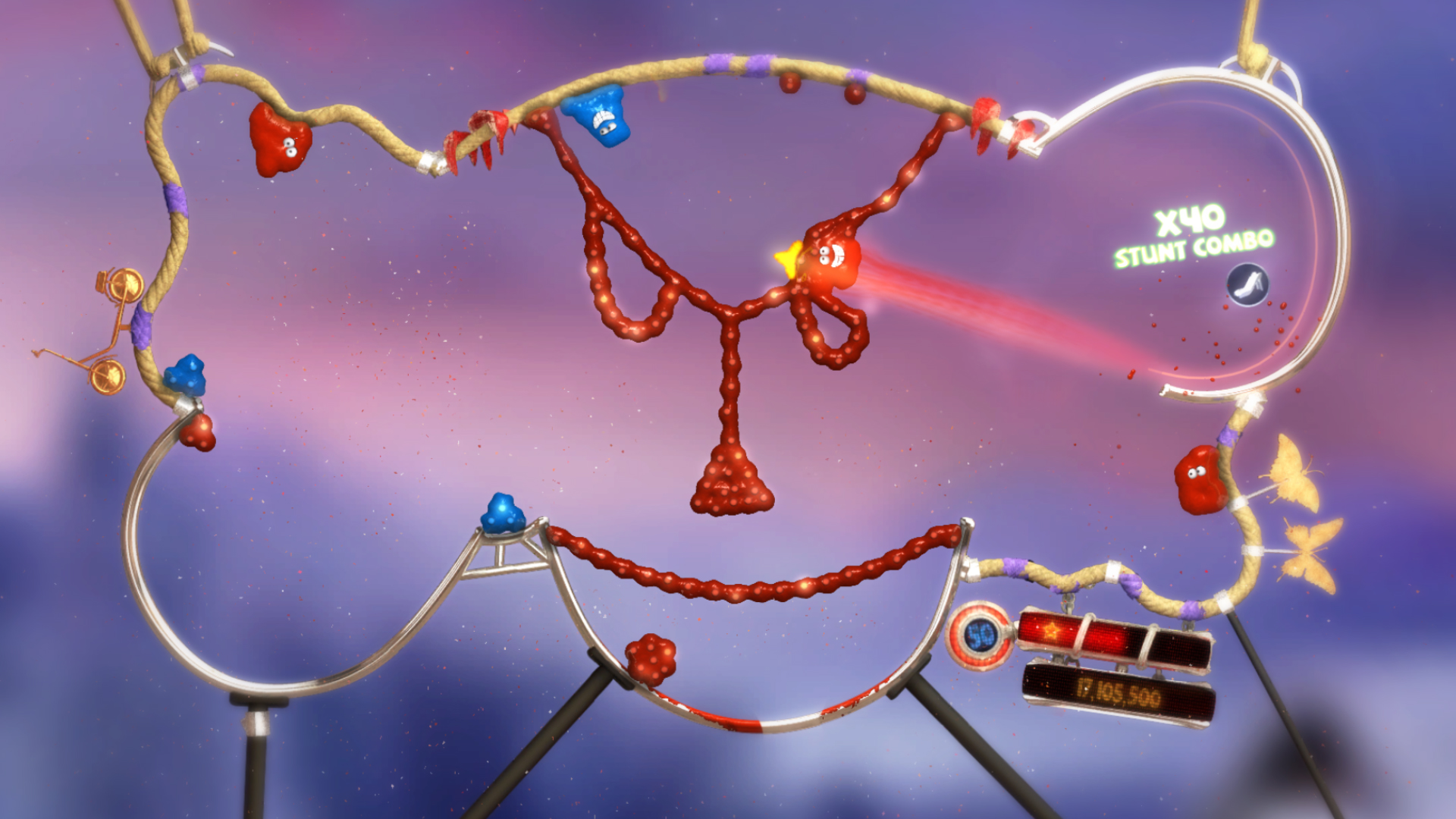
The Splatters is an Xbox Live Arcade game that was developed by a third-party studio and published by Microsoft Studios in 2012.

By the Electronic Entertainment Expo 2011 in June 2011, Microsoft Game Studios was quietly renamed to Microsoft Studios. Later in 2011, Microsoft Studios acquired Twisted Pixel Games. In early December 2011, Microsoft Studios created Microsoft Casual Games, a division to revamp its past casual games for Windows (like Windows Solitaire and MSN Games) using more up-to-date software delivery platforms.

In 2012, Phil Harrison, the former Sony worldwide studios head, joined Microsoft as head of Microsoft Studios Europe and IEB. Microsoft Studios acquired developer Press Play, known for developing Tentacles and Max & the Magic Marker. They also announced a new development studio in London, England. Later in 2012, Microsoft downsized Microsoft Game Studios Vancouver due to the cancellation of the Kinect family title Project Columbia and announced that the ongoing development of free-to-play title Microsoft Flight had been ceased due to portfolio evaluation. The reduced Vancouver studios were renamed to Black Tusk Studios and tasked with making similar franchise-building title as Halo.

In 2013, Microsoft established European studio Lift London, a studio that would create cloud-based games for tablets, mobiles and TVs. Later, it created a new "Deep Tech" team inside its Developer and Platform Evangelism (DPE) unit; the new team is charged with working with top developers outside the company to build next-generation applications on top of Microsoft platforms.

While Mattrick had overseen much of the development of Microsoft's next console, the Xbox One, he left in July 2013, prior to its release, to take over as CEO of Zynga. Mattrick was succeeded by Julie Larson-Green, who was named the president of the Devices and Studios Engineering Group, following a realignment of Microsoft's divisions, overseeing both the Xbox hardware divisions and Microsoft Studios.

==== Shifting priorities under Microsoft CEO Satya Nadella ====
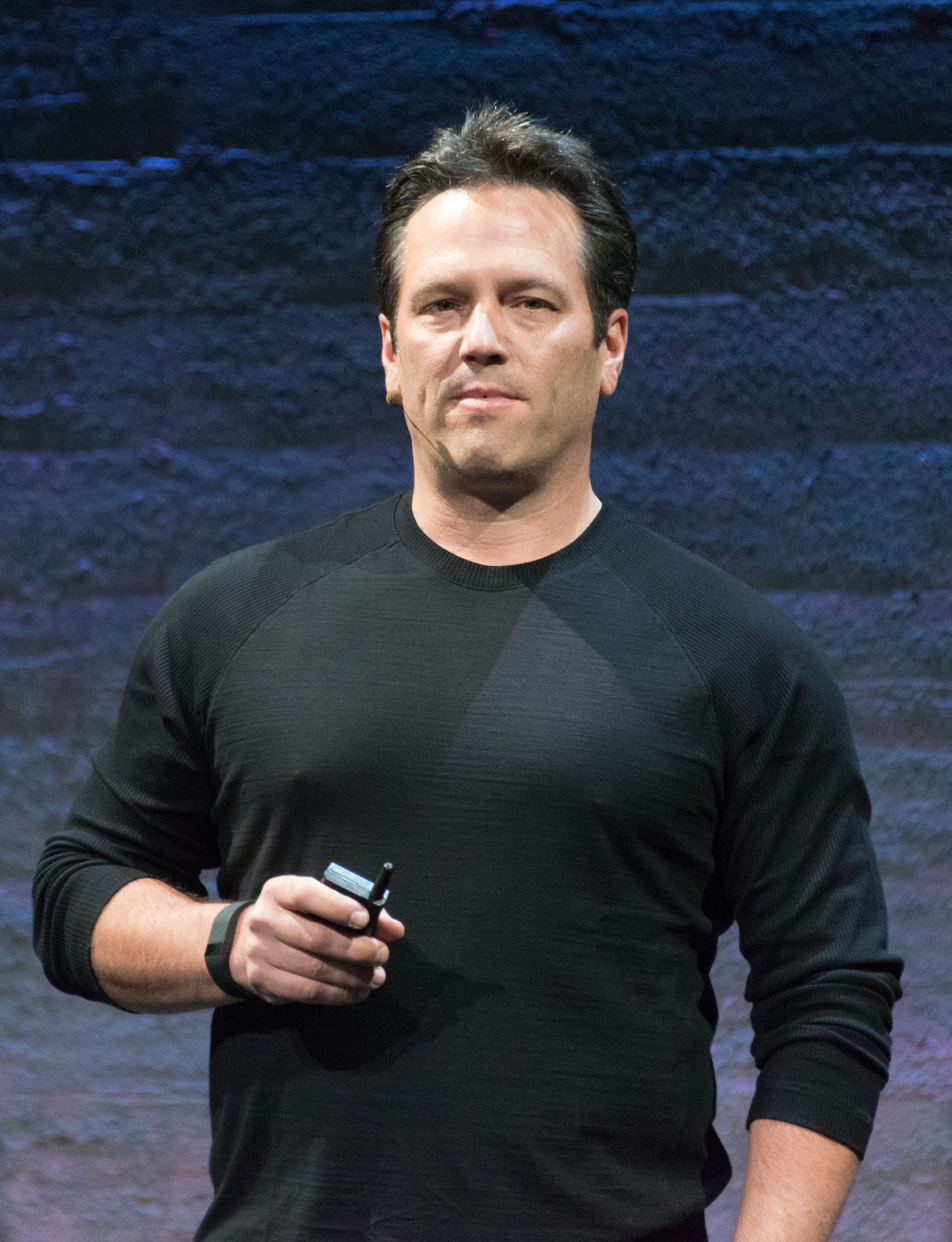
Phil Spencer, corporate vice-president of Microsoft Studios from 2014 to 2017

Satya Nadella became CEO of Microsoft in February 2014. At this time, Microsoft was facing strong competition in the consumer market, and within the gaming sector, the Xbox One (released in 2013) was more expensive than competitors and had too much focus on non-gaming functions. Under Nadella's direction, Phil Spencer was named the new head of Microsoft Studios to replace Jason Holtman, who had only been its lead for the prior six months.

In November 2014, Microsoft acquired Mojang Studios, the developers behind Minecraft, for US$2.5 billion. Upon the deal's completion, the studio's key founding personnel, Markus Persson, Jakob Porsér and Carl Manneh, departed Mojang. Microsoft Studios committed to keeping Minecraft available across multiple platforms, including rival PlayStation consoles. Matt Booty, the studio's corporate vice-president in 2020, said the acquisition of Mojang served as the template for later acquisitions, as Mojang was left to run as an "unplugged studio" with limited integration into the Microsoft corporation, minimizing the disruption of Mojang's normal day-to-day business matters nor impeding on the studio's freedom.

Additional intellectual property (IP) acquisitions by Microsoft Studios in 2014 included a publishing contract with Undead Labs for its game State of Decay, the rights to the Gears of War series from Epic Games, and the Rise of IP (Rise of Nations and Rise of Nations: Rise of Legends) from Big Huge Games. Microsoft Studios assigned Gears of War to Black Tusk Studios, which was later rebranded in 2015 as The Coalition.

In July 2014, it was announced that Xbox Entertainment Studios would be closed in the following months; the closure was completed by October 29. On March 4, 2015, Microsoft announced that it was merging UK-based studios, Lift London and Soho Productions for further games development, with the amalgam continuing to operate under the Lift London name. On March 7, Microsoft announced at the Game Developers Conference that HoloLens games were coming to Xbox One. On March 9, Microsoft announced that Kudo Tsunoda's role was expanding and that he would be the new studio team leader for studios such as Press Play, Lift London and a new internal studio called Decisive Games. Decisive Games was previously mentioned in job postings, saying that they were hiring for work on a "beloved strategy game" for Xbox One and PC, but this is the first public acknowledgement of the team's existence as a first-party studio. Twisted Pixel and Microsoft Studios agreed to split in September 2015.

Kudo Tsunoda left the Xbox division in November 2015 for the development of HoloLens and Microsoft Edge, and other projects that could improve means of human interaction, including voice and gesture. Tsunoda's role was filled by Hanno Lemke and Shannon Loftis. In 2016, Microsoft was perceived as "unifying PC and Xbox One" platforms. In March 2016, Microsoft canceled development of two major projects: Lionhead's Fable Legends and Press Play's Project Knoxville, shuttering both studios in the following months. Around the same time, changes to Microsoft Studios' website indicated that further studios—BigPark, Good Science Studio, Leap Experience Pioneers (LXP), Function Studios and State of the Art (SOTA)—had been closed, Microsoft Studios clarified that all of them had been consolidated into other Microsoft Studios teams over the past several years.

In September 2017, Spencer was promoted to the senior leadership team, gaining the title of "executive vice-president of gaming". At this point, Microsoft Studios directly reported to Nadella. In January 2018, Matt Booty was promoted from leader in the Minecraft games business to corporate vice-president of Microsoft Studios. On June 10, 2018, during the Electronic Entertainment Expo 2018, Microsoft announced the acquisitions of Ninja Theory, Playground Games, Undead Labs and Compulsion Games, as well as the opening of a new studio in Santa Monica, California, entitled The Initiative, which would be led by the former Crystal Dynamics studio head Darrell Gallagher. In November, Microsoft Studios announced further acquisitions with Obsidian Entertainment and inXile Entertainment.

=== Rebranding as Xbox Game Studios (2019–2021) ===
The studio rebranded itself on February 5, 2019, as Xbox Game Studios, as to reflect Microsoft's intent to use the Xbox brand to support gaming across all the devices it supports. At E3 2019, Xbox Game Studios announced it had acquired Double Fine, and established a new internal studio dedicated to Age of Empires headed by Shannon Loftis, bringing its total studio count to fifteen. This studio, later named World's Edge, does not directly develop any games, but oversees efforts from external studios, such as Relic Entertainment, Forgotten Empires and Tantalus Media, to assure the series is being developed in the right direction, according to creative director Adam Isgreen.

Booty has stated that with studios like Obsidian, Ninja Theory, and Double Fine, which have traditionally supported multiplatform games, it will determine if it makes sense for its future products to be treated as Microsoft-exclusive content for Xbox and Windows computers, or to allow these to be published across multiple platforms. That decision will be based on a "network effect", whether having these games on other platforms will better support the franchise and thus worthwhile for Microsoft to help dedicate resources towards it, such as it had with Minecraft. Xbox Game Studios has allowed some of the content developed by its studios or that was previously published exclusively for the Xbox and Windows systems to be released on Nintendo systems, notably the Nintendo Switch versions of Cuphead from Studio MDHR and Ori and the Blind Forest from Moon Studios, and allowing for the titular characters from Rare's Banjo-Kazooie into Super Smash Bros. Ultimate. However, the division stated that these releases were generally "existing commitments to other platforms" that it allowed studios to honor, but it otherwise has "no plans to further expand our exclusive first party games to other consoles".

Near the end of 2019, with the combined fifteen studios now under Xbox Game Studios, Booty stated that it now had more games than ever to handle, and were likely not going to acquire any additional studios in the near future, stating "we've been shifting our focus inside Xbox Game Studios from acquisition and growth, to a phase of execution and delivery". Additionally, as Microsoft started promotion of its fourth-generation of Xbox, including the Xbox Series X, Booty stated that titles developed by Xbox Game Studios in year or two following its release will not be exclusively for the new generation of consoles, but instead will support both Xbox One and the new console, with some games receiving enhanced performance when played on the new console lineup. Booty said that with the large number of studios it had recently acquired, as well as ongoing external partnerships and its Xbox Game Pass service, the Studios are able to support a "breadth of offerings in the portfolio" designed to attract a large number of players. Further, in an interview in November 2020, Phil Spencer said during an interview regarding the future of the Xbox brand that he intends to put more focus on outputting RPGs, which had to that point been underserved.

Microsoft and ZeniMax Media announced on September 21, 2020, that Microsoft planned to acquire ZeniMax and its family of studios, which include Bethesda Game Studios, Arkane Studios, id Software, MachineGames, Tango Gameworks, and ZeniMax Online Studios, for over US$7.5 billion in cash. According to Spencer, the ZeniMax acquisition was intended to give Microsoft a large library of games known around the world, and to expand the library of Xbox Game Pass and XCloud. However, during 2023 hearings regarding the Federal Trade Commission's concern over the proposed acquisition of Activision Blizzard by Microsoft, Spencer said that Sony Interactive Entertainment had made sways at Bethesda to keep Starfield as a PlayStation-exclusive, further prompting Microsoft to purchase Zenimax. Both U.S. and European Union regulatory agencies approved the acquisition by early March 2021, and the acquisition was formally completed by March 9, 2021. The total price of the deal was $8.1 billion Bethesda Softworks, the primarily publisher for all of ZeniMax's games, remained as an operational unit under Microsoft with the acquisition and retained all its current leadership. With the acquisition, future games from the studios will be exclusive to Xbox consoles, but existing commitments to other platforms (such as Arkane Studios' Deathloop and Tango Gameworks' Ghostwire: Tokyo, which are contractually exclusive to PlayStation 5 for a period of 12 months before their release on Xbox Series X and Xbox Series S) will still be honored. Spencer stated that Game Pass was also fundamental driver for the acquisition. A preliminary injunction to block the acquisition had been sought in an ongoing class-action lawsuit that ZeniMax faced over Fallout 4, with the plaintiffs in the case arguing that Microsoft could shield ZeniMax's assets from damages should it be found liable after the acquisition. The ZeniMax Board of Directors was dissolved following the Microsoft purchase.

=== Acquisition of Activision Blizzard and multiplatform initiatives (2022–2025) ===
On January 18, 2022, Microsoft announced its intent to acquire Activision Blizzard in an all-cash deal valued at $68.7 billion. Microsoft stated that this acquisition would make it the third-largest gaming company by revenue, following Tencent and Sony. With the announcement, Microsoft also announced a major change to its corporate structure, with Phil Spencer becoming CEO of the new division Microsoft Gaming, with Matt Booty leading Xbox Game Studios under it. Once approved, Activision Blizzard would then become a subdivision of Microsoft Gaming. The deal was cleared by various national regulators by October 13, 2023, with Microsoft closing the deal the same day.

During litigation on the merger with the United States Federal Trade Commission, internal documents from Microsoft c. 2020 show strong interest in re-acquiring Bungie, or acquiring Sega's game development companies, Supergiant Games, Niantic, Inc., Thunderful Group, Zynga, IO Interactive, Scopely, or Playrix as part of Xbox Game Studios, as well as publisher Square Enix to help bolster its Asian presence and mobile market share.

In January 2023, Microsoft laid off 10,000 employees, which represented about 5% of its global workforce. Included in those layoffs were many employees from 343 Industries, The Coalition, and Bethesda Game Studios. On October 26, 2023, Microsoft announced the promotion of several employees in the company, including Sarah Bond being promoted to president of Xbox, overseeing all Xbox platform, business, and hardware work, and Matt Booty promoted from president of Xbox to president of Game Content and Studios, including the new responsibility of overseeing ZeniMax and Bethesda, with Jamie Leder still running Zenimax as a limited integration entity, but now reporting to Matt. In the wake of Matt Booty's promotion, Alan Hartman, then the head of Turn 10, was subsequently promoted to head of Xbox Game Studios. On October 6, 2024, 343 Industries officially announced its rebranding as Halo Studios, additionally confirming that multiple Halo games were in development and that said projects would now use Unreal Engine 5 as opposed to the proprietary Slipspace Engine that powered Halo Infinite. On October 14, Rare creative lead Craig Duncan was announced to be succeeding Alan Hartman as head of Xbox Game Studios beginning in November 2024, with Hartman retiring after a three-decade tenure at Microsoft.

In July 2025, Microsoft Gaming performed a business restructuring ahead of the new financial year, which resulted in layoffs at Xbox Game Studios Rare, Compulsion Games, Undead Labs and Turn 10 Studios. The latter, who conceived and developed the Forza Motorsport series, was reported to have lost almost half of its workforce and was anticipated to be restructured as a support studio for Motorsport's sister series Forza Horizon and developments for the ForzaTech engine, according to former content coordinator Fred Russell. In addition, Rare's action-adventure game Everwild ceased production, while Microsoft also canceled the Perfect Dark reboot and closed its developer The Initiative simultaneously. Alongside Everwild's cancelation, Rare veteran and designer Gregg Mayles later departed the company after 36 years in October.

Over 2024 and 2025, a series of video games published by Microsoft Gaming divisions, most notably Xbox Game Studios' titles, were released on PlayStation and Nintendo consoles under an initiative to pivot focus from the Xbox series of consoles and eventually cease to produce exclusive titles for the consoles like Sega. Xbox Game Studios had also released Nintendo Entertainment System, Super Nintendo Entertainment System and Nintendo 64 video games on the Nintendo Switch Online service in 2024, all of whom were developed by Rare and in some cases, formerly published by Nintendo.

=== Refocus on Xbox exclusivity and studio lineup reset (2026) ===
Asha Sharma had replaced Spencer as the head of Microsoft Gaming in February 2026, and made a number of significant changes at that level, including renaming the division as Xbox, and refocusing efforts on enhancing the Xbox brand, re-evaluating the approach it was taking on console exclusivity. Several reports in early June 2026 suggested major changes were going to be made to the Xbox division and to Xbox Game Studios to make this segment of Microsoft's business more economical and the need to "reset the business", including layoffs and redirecting focus at Xbox Game Studios.

In wake of those reports, Duncan announced his retirement as head of Xbox Game Studios along with his chief of staff Loiuse O'Conner on June 15, 2026. The studios will be overseen by Matt Booty until a replacement is named. Jason Schreier of Bloomberg News reported the same day that multiple studios, including Compulsion Games, Double Fine, and Ninja Theory, were in negotiations for independent buyouts and separation from the division to avoid being shuttered. Microsoft announced on July 6, 2026, that as part of the reorganization, Double Fine and Compulsion Games were released from Xbox Game Studios and reverted to independent studios while retaining ownership of their games and intellectual property. Undead Labs and Ninja Theory were planned to be sold to unnamed third parties, and they were evaluating the fate of Arkane Studios, while Mojang Studios would be reporting directly to Sharma. These changes were in addition to 1600 layoffs across the Xbox division at that time with another 1600 positions to be eliminated later. Among cuts include 25% of Obsidian's staff, which also cancelled several projects including a sequel to Avowed, and instead put to develop a new Fallout game, according to Bloomberg News.

Further restructuring occurred in September 2026, with 268 layoffs. Development of Halo along with studios World's Edge and Rare were moved under the Activision division, Obsidian moved to Bethesda, and Microsoft Casual Games moved under King. In moving World's Edge, around half the studio was let go and a planned Age of Empires game cancelled. Turn 10 Studios was merged into Playground Games to focus on Forza and Fable titles. Undead Labs became independent as an employee-owned studio and retained the rights to the State of Decay franchise, while consultation began at Ninja Theory after two separate agreements to buy the studio failed.

== Studios ==
Name	Headquarters	Founded	Acquired	Notable releases
The Coalition	Vancouver	2010	—	Gears of War series (2015–present)
Halo Studios	Redmond, Washington	2007	—	Halo series (2011–2026); support team for legacy titles (2026–present)
inXile Entertainment	Tustin, California	2002	2018	Wasteland series, Clockwork Revolution
Ninja Theory	Cambridge, England	2000	2018	Heavenly Sword, Enslaved: Odyssey to the West, Hellblade series; currently in consultation for divesture or closure since July 2026
Playground Games	Leamington Spa	2010	2018	Forza series, Fable (2017–present); merged with Turn 10 Studios in September 2026.
Xbox Game Studios Publishing	Redmond, Washington	2000	—	Games in collaboration with external developers such as Killer Instinct (2013), Quantum Break, the Ori series, Tell Me Why, Ara: History Untold, Ninja Gaiden 4, Towerborne, OD and PHYSINT

=== Former ===
Name	Headquarters	Founded	Acquired	Divested	Fate	Notable releases
Aces Game Studio	—	—	—	—	Closed	Microsoft Flight Simulator series
BigPark	—	—	—	2018	Removed from Microsoft's games business	Kinect Joy Ride, Kinect Sports: Season Two, Joy Ride Turbo
Bungie	Bellevue, Washington	1991	2000	2007	Spun off	Halo series (2001–2010)
Carbonated Games	—	—	—	—	Closed	Hexic, Hexic 2, Fable II Pub Games
Compulsion Games	Montreal	2009	2018	2026	Returned to management as an independent studio	Contrast, We Happy Few, South of Midnight
Digital Anvil	Austin, Texas	1996	2000	2006	Consolidated	Brute Force, Freelancer, Starlancer
Double Fine	San Francisco	2000	2019	2026	Returned to management as an independent studio	Psychonauts series, Brütal Legend, Costume Quest series, Stacking, Keeper, Kiln
Ensemble Studios	Dallas, Texas	1994	2001	2009	Closed	Age of Empires series (1997–2007), Age of Mythology, Halo Wars
FASA Studio	Redmond, Washington	1994	2000	2007	Closed	Crimson Skies series, MechAssault series, MechWarrior series, Shadowrun
Good Science Studio	—	—	—	—	Consolidated	Kinect Adventures, Kinect Fun Labs, Kinect Star Wars
Hired Gun	—	—	—	—	Consolidated	Halo 2 PC port
Indie Games	Salt Lake City	1982	2000	2004	Sold to Take-Two Interactive	Links series
The Initiative	Santa Monica, California	2018	—	2025	Closed	Perfect Dark (cancelled)
Lift London	—	—	—	2019	Removed from Microsoft's games business	—
Lionhead Studios	Guildford	1997	2006	2016	Closed	Fable series (2004–2012), Black & White series
Microsoft Casual Games	—	2012	—	2026	Transferred to King	—
Microsoft Game Studios Japan	Chōfu	2005	—	2014	Closed	Blue Dragon series, Every Party, Infinite Undiscovery, Lost Odyssey, Magatama, Phantom Dust, Shenmue II Xbox port, True Fantasy Live Online
Microsoft Studios Victoria	—	—	—	—	Closed	—
Mojang Studios	Stockholm	2009	2014	2026	Transferred to Xbox	Minecraft series
Obsidian Entertainment	Irvine, California	2003	2018	2026	Transferred to ZeniMax Media	Fallout: New Vegas, Pillars of Eternity series, The Outer Worlds series, Grounded series
Press Play	Copenhagen	2006	2012	2016	Closed	Max: The Curse of Brotherhood, Kalimba
Rare	Twycross	1985	2002	2026	Transferred to Activision	Battletoads series, Killer Instinct series (1994–1996), Banjo-Kazooie series, Conker series, Perfect Dark series (2000–2005), Viva Piñata series, Sea of Thieves
Team Dakota	—	—	—	—	Consolidated	Project Spark
Turn 10 Studios	Redmond, Washington	2001	—	2026	Merged with Playground Games, renamed to Playground Games Redmond.	Forza Motorsport series, support for Forza Horizon series and Fable
Twisted Pixel Games	Austin, Texas	2006	2011	2015	Spun off	The Gunstringer, LocoCycle, The Maw, 'Splosion Man
Undead Labs	Seattle, Washington	2009	2018	2026	Returned to management as an independent studio	State of Decay series
WingNut Interactive	—	—	—	—	Sold to WingNut Films	Peter Jackson's joint venture game studio
World's Edge	Redmond, Washington	2019	—	2026	Transferred to Activision	Age of Empires series (2019–present), Age of Mythology: Retold
Xbox Entertainment Studios	—	2012	—	2014	Consolidated	—
Xbox Live Productions	—	—	—	—	Consolidated	—
