= List of Xbox One X enhanced games =

This is a list of Xbox One X enhanced games. These games are Xbox One games and backwards compatible Xbox 360 and Xbox games that are enhanced by console-specific updates/patches when played on an Xbox One X.

Xbox One games without an Xbox One X update/patch, including Xbox 360 and Xbox backwards compatible titles, can also take advantage of the Xbox One X's hardware. These improvements can include the following:

- Improved framerate stability
- Games utilizing a dynamic resolution will hit their max resolution more often, or at all times
- 16x anisotropic filtering
- Forced V-sync to decrease or eliminate screen tearing.
- Variable refresh rate compatibility (when used with a compatible display)

== Difference between 4K Ultra HD, HDR, and Xbox One X enhanced games ==
The game enhancement descriptions as shown in Xbox One game packaging

- Xbox One X enhanced (declaration) – Games that are said to be Xbox One X Enhanced offer one or more of the following benefits over non-Enhanced editions:

- Graphic enhancements
- Additional visual effects
- Higher framerate
- Higher resolution (up to 4K, depending on the user's TV)

- 4K Ultra HD (declaration) – 4K refers to image resolution, or the number of pixels used for each image. Games described as being 4K offer a resolution of 3840 pixels × 2160 lines, offering substantially higher resolution than 1080p HD. To view 4K games at their native resolution, the user's TV must be 4K-capable.
- HDR (High dynamic range) (declaration) – Visual dynamic range refers to the difference between the darkest and brightest information a game can show. As suggested by the term HDR some games offer darker darks and brighter brights than others, depending on the screen you view them on. HDR on Xbox has a 10-bit color range, or wide color gamut, which uses more colors for a richer, more detailed image. On Xbox, this feature also goes by the name Dolby Vision, which is used by some video apps.
- Dolby Atmos – The game supports Dolby Atmos surround sound.

== List of enhanced titles ==
There are currently 436 games on this list.

Game title	Known enhancements					Enhanced patch availability	Notes/references
Game title	4K	HDR	FPS	Dolby Atmos	Other	Enhanced patch availability	Notes/references
#Funtime	Yes	Yes					
8 to Glory: The Official Game of the PBR	Yes	Yes					
A Way Out			60		A choice of a better resolution or a higher frame rate	Available	
Aaero	Yes	Yes	60			Available	
Absolver	Yes						
Aery - Broken Memories	Yes	Yes					
Aery - Little Bird Adventure	Yes	Yes					
Aftercharge		Yes					
Age of Wonders: Planetfall	Yes		30/60		1080p @ 60 FPS or 1440p @ 30 FPS		
Agents of Mayhem			30/60		1440p	Available	
Anthem	Yes	Yes	30		CBR	Available	
AO Tennis	Yes	Yes				Available	
AO Tennis 2	Yes	Yes					
Apex Legends							
Ark: Survival Evolved		Yes	30/60		1080p @ 60 FPS or 1440p @ 30 FPS	Available	
Armed and Dangerous	Yes					Available	Original Xbox game
The Artful Escape	Yes						
ASCENDANCE - First Horizon	Yes	Yes					
Ash of Gods: Redemption							
Ashen	Yes						As seen in E3 2017 trailer
Ashes Cricket	Yes	Yes				Available	
Assassin's Creed III Remastered	Yes	Yes	30				
Assassin's Creed	Yes		30			Available	Xbox 360 game
Assassin's Creed: Origins	Yes	Yes	30	Yes	Dynamic resolution	Available	
Assassin's Creed Rogue Remastered	Yes		30			Available	
Assassin's Creed Odyssey	Yes	Yes	30			Available	
Assassin's Creed Valhalla	Yes	Yes	30		Dynamic resolution up to 4K. Higher quality textures and improved draw distances.	Available	
Assault Android Cactus	Yes		60			Available	
Astroneer	Yes					Available	
Atlas	Yes						
Attack on Titan 2							
Banjo-Kazooie	Yes		30			Available	Xbox 360 game
Banjo-Kazooie: Nuts & Bolts	Yes		30			Available	Xbox 360 game
Banjo-Tooie	Yes		30			Available	Xbox 360 game
Batman: Return to Arkham - Arkham Asylum			45				
Batman: Return to Arkham - Arkham City			30				
Battlefield 1	Yes	Yes	60	Yes		Available	
Battlefield V	Yes	Yes	60	Yes	Dynamic resolution	Available	
Battlerite							
Battletoads	Yes						
Battlezone Gold Edition	Yes						
Bayonetta			60		1440p	Port of an Xbox 360 game (The original Xbox 360 version is not enhanced)	
Bee Simulator	Yes	Yes					
Below	Yes						
Bendy and the Ink Machine	Yes						
Biomutant	Yes						
Bioshock: The Collection	Yes		60			Available	
Black							Original Xbox game
Black Desert Online	Yes	Yes					
Black Paradox	Yes						
Blair Witch	Yes	Yes					
Blast Zone! Tournament	Yes						
Bless Unleashed	Yes	Yes					
Blinx: The Time Sweeper							Original Xbox game
BloodRayne 2							Original Xbox game
Bloodstained: Ritual of the Night	Yes						
Borderlands 2	Yes	Yes	60			Available	
Borderlands 3		Yes		Yes			
Borderlands: Game of the Year Edition	Yes	Yes	60			Available	
Borderlands: The Pre-Sequel	Yes	Yes	60			Available	
Black Desert	Yes						
Brawlhalla	Yes						
Brawlout	Yes						
Breakdown							Original Xbox game
Brunswick Pro Billiards	Yes						
Bulletstorm: Full Clip Edition	Yes						
Burnout Paradise Remastered	Yes		60				
Bus Simulator 18			30		Runs at 1080p, No 4K/HDR	Yes	Patch notes 1.3.0.1 from Astragon Entertainment: Added performance/quality slider if 4K video output is detected (allows improved quality settings on PS4 Pro & Xbox One X
Call of Cthulhu							
Call of Duty: Infinite Warfare	Yes		60			Available	
Call of Duty: WWII	Yes	Yes	60			Available	
Call of Duty: Black Ops 4	Yes	Yes	60			Available	
Call of Duty: Modern Warfare 2 Campaign Remastered	Yes	Yes	60				
Call of Duty: Black Ops Cold War	Yes	Yes	60	Yes		Available	
Call of Duty: Modern Warfare	Yes	Yes	60	Yes		Available	
Call of Duty: Warzone	Yes	Yes		Yes			
Chess Ultra	Yes	Yes	60			Available	
Cities: Skylines	Yes						
Code Vein			60				
Conan Exiles	Yes					Available	
Conker: Live & Reloaded			30				Original Xbox game
Contra: Rogue Corps	Yes	Yes					
Control							
Cooking Simulator	Yes						
Crackdown	Yes		30			Available	Xbox 360 game
Crackdown 3	Yes	Yes	30	Yes	Dynamic 2160p, scales horizontally as low as 2304x2160 in rare instances.	Available	
Crash Bandicoot 4: It's About Time			60		Dynamic 1080p resolution at a consistent 60FPS, compared to the 900p 30FPS target of Xbox One.	Available	
Crash Bandicoot N. Sane Trilogy	Yes	Yes	30			Available	
Crash Team Racing Nitro-Fueled	Yes	Yes	30				
The Crew 2	Yes						
Crimson Skies: High Road to Revenge							Original Xbox game
CrossCode							
CrossfireX		Yes					
Crossout	Yes					Available	
Cuphead	Yes		60				
Cyberpunk 2077		Yes	30	Yes	Higher quality textures compared to Xbox One.		
Danger Zone	Yes					Available	
Danger Zone 2	Yes						
Dark and Light	Yes						
Dark Souls Remastered			60			Available	
Darksiders	Yes					Available	Xbox 360 game
Darksiders Genesis							
Darksiders: Warmastered Edition	Yes						
Darksiders II: Deathinitive Edition	Yes						
Darksiders III	Yes	Yes					
The Darwin Project	Yes	Yes					
Dauntless							
DayZ	Yes						
Dead or Alive 6	Yes	Yes					
Dead Rising 4		Yes	30			Available	
Dead Static Drive							
Dead to Rights							Original Xbox game
Deep Rock Galactic		Yes					
Deliver Us The Moon	Yes	Yes					
Destiny 2	Yes	Yes	30			Available	
Destroy All Humans! (2005)			30				Original Xbox game
Deus Ex: Mankind Divided		Yes	30				
Devil May Cry 5	Yes	Yes	60				
Diablo III: Ultimate Evil Edition	Yes		60		Dynamic resolution	Available	
Dirt Rally 2.0	Yes	Yes	60		Dynamic resolution	Available	
Dishonored 2	Yes		30			Available	
Dishonored: Death of the Outsider	Yes					Available	
Disneyland Adventures	Yes	Yes				Available	
Divinity: Original Sin 2 - Definitive Edition	Yes	Yes					
Donut County	Yes	Yes					
DOOM	Yes		60		Dynamic resolution	Available	
DOOM 3	Yes		60				
DOOM 64							
DOOM Eternal		Yes					
Dovetail Games Euro Fishing						Available	
Dragon Ball FighterZ			60		1800p	Available	
Dragon Ball Z: Kakarot	Yes		30				
Dynasty Warriors 9						Available	
Elden Ring		Yes	30				
The Elder Scrolls Online	Yes	Yes	30/60			Available	
The Elder Scrolls III: Morrowind			60				Original Xbox game
The Elder Scrolls IV: Oblivion	Yes		30			Available	Xbox 360 game
The Elder Scrolls V: Skyrim Special Edition	Yes		30		Up to 4K with dynamic resolution	Available	
Elex	Yes					Available	
Elite: Dangerous	Yes		30/60			Available	
Everspace	Yes					Available	
The Evil Within 2	Yes	Yes	30/60			Available	
F1 2017	Yes	Yes	60		"Other graphical improvements"	Available	
F1 2018	Yes	Yes	60			Available	
F1 2019	Yes	Yes	60			Available	
F1 2020	Yes	Yes					
Fable Anniversary	Yes				4K	Available	Xbox 360 game
Fable Fortune	Yes						
Fable II	Yes				4K		Xbox 360 game
Fable III					Resolution between 1440p and 4K		Xbox 360 game
Fallout 3	Yes		30			Available	Xbox 360 game
Fallout 4	Yes		30		4K with dynamic resolution, further draw distance and enhanced godray effects	Available	
Fallout 76	Yes	Yes	30			Available	
Far Cry 3 Classic Edition			30				
Far Cry 5	Yes	Yes	30			Available	
Far Cry New Dawn	Yes	Yes	30				
Farming Simulator 17	Yes		30			Available	
Farming Simulator 18	Yes						
Farming Simulator 19							
Fe	Yes					Available	
FIA European Truck Racing Championship	Yes						
FIFA 18	Yes	Yes	60			Available	
FIFA 19	Yes	Yes					
FIFA 20	Yes	Yes					
Final Fantasy X/X-2 HD Remaster	Yes		30				
Final Fantasy XII: The Zodiac Age			30				
Final Fantasy XIII	Yes		30		1728p (3x per axis from 576p, 9x total enhancement)	Available	Xbox 360 game
Final Fantasy XIII-2	Yes		30		4K	Available	Xbox 360 game
Final Fantasy XV	Yes	Yes	30/60	Yes	An option for enhanced visuals or 60 FPS	Available	
For Honor	Yes		30			Available	
Formula Retro Racing	Yes						
Forsaken Remastered	Yes						
Fortnite	Yes	Yes	60/30	Yes	Runs at 4K60 in Battle Royale mode and 4K30 in Save The World mode, increased texture fidelity and post processing effects.	Available	
Forza Horizon	Yes					Available	Xbox 360 game
Forza Horizon 3	Yes	Yes	30			Available	
Forza Horizon 4	Yes	Yes	30/60		An option for enhanced visuals or 60 FPS	Available	
Forza Motorsport 7	Yes	Yes	60			Available	
Full Spectrum Warrior							Original Xbox game
Fuzion Frenzy							Original Xbox game
Gears of War 2	Yes		30		4K	Available	Xbox 360 game
Gears of War 3	Yes		30		1440p. Also has SBS 3DTV support	Available	Xbox 360 game
Gears of War 4	Yes	Yes	30/60	Yes	Choice between 4K 30 FPS or dynamic resolution at 60 FPS for Campaign/Horde, and 60 FPS for Versus	Available	Higher resolution textures, fully dynamic shadows, improved reflections
Gears 5	Yes	Yes	60	Yes	60 FPS all modes except split-screen campaign (30 FPS)	Available	
Ghostbusters The Video Game Remastered	Yes						
Ginger: Beyond The Crystal							
Goat Simulator	Yes						
Grabbed by the Ghoulies	Yes					Available	Original Xbox game
Gravel		Yes				Available	
GreedFall		Yes					
GRIDD: Retroenhanced	Yes	Yes				Available	
Guacamelee! 2							
Gwent: The Witcher Card Game							
Halo 3		Yes	30		1920p	Available	Xbox 360 game
Halo 5: Guardians	Yes		60			Available	
Halo: The Master Chief Collection	Yes	Yes	60				
Halo Wars 2	Yes	Yes	30			Available	
Hand of Fate 2	Yes					Available	
Hellblade: Senua's Sacrifice	Yes	Yes	30/60			Available	
Hello Neighbor	Yes					Available	
Hexologic	Yes						
Hitman	Yes	Yes	30/60			Available	
Hitman 2	Yes	Yes	30/60			Available	
Hitman Sniper Assassin	Yes	Yes					
Hitman: Absolution HD			60				
Hitman: Blood Money HD	Yes		60				
Homefront: The Revolution		Yes	30		1800p	Available	
Hotline Miami Collection	Yes						
theHunter: Call of the Wild			30			Available	
Hunter: The Reckoning							Original Xbox game
Immortal: Unchained	Yes						
Immortals: Fenyx Rising	Yes	Yes	30		Dynamic Resolution upsampled to 4K. Higher quality textures.		
The Incredible Adventures of Van Helsing III	Yes					Available	
Indiana Jones and the Emperor's Tomb							
Injustice 2	Yes	Yes	30/60		1880x1620p	Available	Drops to 30 FPS only when using super move sequences
It Takes Two			60		Significantly improved visual fidelity in comparison to Xbox One and Xbox One S.		
Jackbox Party Pack 6							
Jade Empire							Original Xbox game
Jump Force	Yes	Yes	30				
Jurassic World Evolution	Yes		60				
Just Cause 4		Yes	30				
Kameo	Yes					Available	Xbox 360 game
Keep Talking and Nobody Explodes	Yes						
Kentucky Route Zero: TV Edition	Yes						
Killer Instinct	Yes		60			Available	
Killing Floor 2					1800p	Available	"We don't have a specific frame rate target for Xbox One X, although the game does run at higher frame rates than the base Xbox One, even at 1800p resolution. We will be using Ultra textures on Xbox One X. We are also increasing the resolution of our shadow maps and shadow draw distance."
Kingdom Come: Deliverance						Available	
Kingdom Hearts HD 1.5 + 2.5 ReMIX	Yes		60				Digital only
Kingdom Hearts HD II.8 Final Chapter Prologue	Yes		60				Digital only
Kingdom Hearts III			30/60				
L.A. Noire	Yes	Yes	30			Available	
The Last Night	Yes	Yes					
Left 4 Dead	Yes		30			Available	Xbox 360 game
Left 4 Dead 2	Yes		30			Available	Xbox 360 game
Lego DC Super-Villains		Yes	30				
Lego Harry Potter Collection	Yes		60				
Lego Marvel Super Heroes 2			30				
Life Is Strange 2						Available	
Life Is Strange: Before the Storm	Yes					Available	
Lightning Returns: Final Fantasy XIII	Yes		30		4K		Xbox 360 game
Little Misfortune	Yes						
The Long Dark							
Lumines Remastered	Yes						
Madden NFL 18	Yes	Yes				Available	
Madden NFL 19	Yes	Yes					
Madden NFL 20	Yes	Yes					
Mafia II: Definitive Edition		Yes					
Mafia III	Yes	Yes	30		4K	Available	
Mafia: Definitive Edition	Yes	Yes					
Mantis Burn Racing	Yes	Yes	60			Available	
Marble Void	Yes					Available	
Mark of the Ninja: Remastered	Yes						
Marvel Heroes	Yes						
Marvel vs. Capcom: Infinite						Available	
Marvel's Avengers	Yes	Yes	30/60				
Mass Effect: Andromeda		Yes	30		1800p		
Mega Man 11	Yes		60				
Mercenaries: Playground of Destruction							Original Xbox game
METAL GEAR SURVIVE		Yes					
Metal Wolf Chaos XD	Yes						
Metro Exodus	Yes	Yes	30				
Middle-earth: Shadow of War	Yes	Yes	30			Available	
Minecraft Dungeons	Yes						
Minion Masters	Yes						
Mirror's Edge	Yes	Yes				Available	Xbox 360 game
Monster Energy Supercross: The Official Videogame			30			Available	
Monster Energy Supercross - The Official Videogame 2		Yes					
Monster Energy Supercross: The Official Videogame 3		Yes					
Monster Hunter: World		Yes	30/60			Available	
Morphite	Yes	Yes				Available	
Mortal Kombat 11		Yes					
MotoGP 18		Yes					
MotoGP 19		Yes					
MotoGP 20		Yes					
Moving Out	Yes						
MX Unleashed	Yes						Original Xbox game
MX vs. ATV All Out	Yes					Available	
MXGP 2019		Yes					
MXGP Pro		Yes					
Narcos: Rise of the Cartels	Yes						
NBA 2K17		Yes					
NBA 2K18	Yes	Yes				Available	
NBA 2K19	Yes	Yes					
NBA 2K20	Yes	Yes					
NBA 2K21	Yes	Yes					
NBA Live 18	Yes					Available	
NBA Live 19							
Need for Speed Heat	Yes	Yes					
Need for Speed Hot Pursuit Remastered	Yes		30/60		Three modes. 4K at 30 fps, 1080p at a consistent 60 fps, or 4K targeting 60 fps.		
Need for Speed Payback			30			Available	
Neon Chrome	Yes						
New Super Lucky's Tale	Yes		60				
NHL 18	Yes					Available	
NHL 19							
NHL 20							
Nier: Automata Become as Gods Edition	Yes	Yes	60				
Nine Parchments	Yes					Available	
Ninja Gaiden Black	Yes						Original Xbox game
Ninja Gaiden II	Yes		60				Xbox 360 game
No Man's Sky	Yes	Yes	30			Available	
Observer							
Ōkami HD	Yes		30			Available	
Ooblets							
The Orange Box	Yes		30			Available	Xbox 360 game
Ori and the Will of the Wisps	Yes		60				
Outcast: Second Contact							
The Outer Worlds	Yes		30			Available	
Outlast 2	Yes					Available	
Overwatch	Yes		60	Yes		Available	
Paladins: Champions of the Realm	Yes					Available	
Panzer Dragoon Orta	Yes						Original Xbox game
Party Golf	Yes						
Path of Exile	Yes		60			Available	
Perfect Dark	Yes					Available	Xbox 360 game
Perfect Dark Zero	Yes					Available	Xbox 360 game
A Plague Tale: Innocence		Yes				Available	
Plants vs Zombies: Battle for Neighborville	Yes	Yes					
Playerunknown's Battlegrounds	Yes	Yes	30			Available	
Portal: Still Alive	Yes		30			Available	Xbox 360 game
Portal 2	Yes		30			Available	Xbox 360 game
Portal Knights	Yes					Available	
Prey			30		1440p	Available	
Prince of Persia: The Sands of Time			30				Original Xbox game
Pro Evolution Soccer 2018			60			Available	
Project Cars 2	Yes	Yes	60			Available	
Psychonauts			30				
Pumpkin Jack	Yes	Yes					
Quantum Break	Yes		30		1440p	Available	
Raiders of the Broken Planet	Yes	Yes			Improved visuals	Available	
Railway Empire	Yes	Yes				Available	
Rage 2							
Rare Replay	Yes		30/60			Available	
Real Farm						Available	
ReCore: Definitive Edition		Yes			1440p	Available	
Red Dead Redemption	Yes		30			Available	Xbox 360 game
Red Dead Redemption 2	Yes	Yes	30			Available	
Redout	Yes		60			Available	
Resident Evil 7: Biohazard	Yes	Yes	60			Available	
Resident Evil 2	Yes	Yes	60	Yes		Available	
Resident Evil 3	Yes	Yes	60				
Resident Evil: Resistance	Yes	Yes					
Return of the Obra Dinn	Yes						
RiME	Yes						
Rise of the Tomb Raider	Yes	Yes	30/60	Yes	A choice of "enriched visuals", "native 4K" or "high frame rate"	Available	
ROBLOX							
Robocraft	Yes					Available	
Rocket League	Yes	Yes					
Riverbond	Yes						
Rugby 18						Available	
Rush: A Disney / Pixar Adventure	Yes	Yes				Available	
Saints Row: The Third Remastered	Yes	Yes	60				
Samurai Shodown	Yes						
Sea of Thieves	Yes	Yes	30				
Sekiro: Shadows Die Twice		Yes	60				
Shadow of the Tomb Raider	Yes	Yes	30/60	Yes	1080p @ 60 FPS or 4K @ 30 FPS	Available	
Sid Meier's Civilization VI							
The Sims 4							
Skate 3	Yes		60			Available	Xbox 360 game
Slime Rancher	Yes	Yes				Available	
Smite						Available	
Sniper Ghost Warrior 3		Yes					
Sonic Forces			60		Some levels (not all) run at 1800p, whilst other levels run at 1080p upscaled to 1800p.	Available	
Sonic Generations	Yes		60			Available	Xbox 360 game
Sonic Mania	Yes		60		240p nearest neighbour upscaled to 4K, instead of 1080p		
Soulcalibur VI							
Soul Hackers 2	Yes						
SpongeBob SquarePants: Battle for Bikini Bottom – Rehydrated	Yes		60				
Spyro Reignited Trilogy			30			Available	
SSX 3	Yes		60			Available	Original Xbox game
Star Wars Battlefront							Original Xbox game
Star Wars Battlefront II (2005)							Original Xbox game
Star Wars: Battlefront II	Yes	Yes	60			Available	
Star Wars Jedi Knight: Jedi Academy							
Star Wars Jedi Starfighter							Original Xbox game
Star Wars Jedi: Fallen Order	Yes	Yes	30/60		1080p @ 60 FPS or 4K @ 30 FPS	Available	
Star Wars: Knights of the Old Republic			60		2560x1920	Available	Original Xbox game
Star Wars Knights of the Old Republic II: The Sith Lords							
Star Wars Republic Commando							
Star Wars: The Force Unleashed	Yes		30			Available	Xbox 360 game
Star Wars: Squadrons	Yes	Yes					
State of Decay 2	Yes	Yes	30			Available	
STEEP		Yes				Available	
Strange Brigade	Yes	Yes					
Subnautica							
Super Lucky's Tale	Yes		60	Yes		Available	
Super Night Riders	Yes					Available	
SUPERHOT	Yes						
SUPERHOT: MIND CONTROL DELETE	Yes						
The Surge	Yes	Yes				Available	
Surviving Mars	Yes					Available	
Tacoma	Yes					Available	
Team Sonic Racing	Yes						
Tennis World Tour							
The Talos Principle	Yes		30/60		60 FPS (not stable) in performance mode, 30 FPS in graphics mode	Available	
Thumper	Yes					Available	
Titanfall 2	Yes		60		60 FPS with dynamic scaling	Available	
Tom Clancy's: The Division	Yes		30			Available	
Tom Clancy's The Division 2	Yes	Yes					
Tom Clancy's Ghost Recon: Wildlands	Yes	Yes	30			Available	
Tom Clancy's: Rainbow Six Siege			60		1800p	Available	
Tony Hawk's Pro Skater 1 + 2		Yes					
Torchlight II	Yes						
Train Sim World	Yes	Yes					
Transcripted						Available	
Tropico 6	Yes	Yes					
TT Isle of Man: Ride On The Edge	Yes					Available	
EA Sports UFC 3						Available	
Unruly Heroes	Yes	Yes					
Untitled Goose Game	Yes						
The Vanishing of Ethan Carter	Yes					Available	
Valkyria Chronicles 4	Yes		60		60FPS 4K		
Vanquish	Yes		60				
Viva Piñata	Yes					Available	Xbox 360 game
Viva Piñata: Trouble in Paradise	Yes					Available	Xbox 360 game
War Thunder	Yes						
Warframe			60				
Warhammer: End Times - Vermintide	Yes		30			Available	
Watch Dogs: Legion	Yes	Yes	30		Dynamic resolution upsampled to 4K.		
We Happy Few	Yes	Yes				Available	
The Witcher 2: Assassins of Kings	Yes		30			Available	Xbox 360 game
The Witcher 3: Wild Hunt	Yes	Yes	30/60		60 FPS/dynamic res. in performance mode, 30 FPS in 4K mode	Available	
Wolfenstein II: The New Colossus	Yes		60			Available	
Wolfenstein: Youngblood	Yes		60				
World of Tanks	Yes	Yes	30		"extra bells and whistles"	Available	
WRC 7	Yes					Available	
WWE 2K18			60			Available	
WWE 2K19							
WWE 2K20	Yes	Yes					
XCOM 2							
Yakuza 0			60				
Yakuza Kiwami			60				
Yet Another Zombie Defense HD	Yes						
Yooka-Laylee and the Impossible Lair	Yes						
Zombie Army 4: Dead War	Yes	Yes					
Zoo Tycoon	Yes	Yes				Available	

== See also ==
- List of Xbox One games
- List of backward-compatible games for Xbox One and Series X
