= Dark and Light =

Dark and Light may refer to:

- Dark and Light (2006 video game), a pay-to-play MMORPG developed by NPCube
- Dark and Light (2017 video game), a "fantasy survival sandbox RPG" developed by Snail Games based on the 2006 game

== See also ==
- Black-and-white dualism, a metaphorical expression of good and evil
- Darkness and Light (disambiguation)
- Light and Darkness (disambiguation)
