= List of Xbox Live games on Windows 10 =

This is a list of Xbox Live enabled games on Windows 10 currently planned or released on Windows 10 operating systems through the Windows Store application. The first wave of Windows 10 Xbox Live games were announced on Xbox Wire in March 2015. All Xbox Live enabled games on Windows 10 are made available on the Windows Store. In order to be released on Windows 10 as an Xbox Live enabled game, the developer needs to be a member of ID@Xbox.

Xbox Live enabled titles will be identifiable in the marketplace by a green banner running across the top of the game page icon that reads "Xbox Live". Games with Cross-buy Column checked yes are part of Xbox Play Anywhere program which allows gamers to play a title on both Xbox One and Windows 10 PCs with a single digital purchase of a supported game.

== Xbox Live Games on Windows 10 ==
Playable = 150 available to purchase
Total = 211

=== List ===
Title	Genre(s)	Developer(s)	Publisher(s)	Cross buy	Cross play	Cross save	Platform(s)	Release Date	Ref.
'n Verlore Verstand	Horror	Skobbejak Games	Skobbejak Games	No	—N/a	Yes	PC, Xbox One	Mar 29, 2018	
A Walk in the Dark	Platform, Action-adventure	Flying Turtle Software	Flying Turtle Software	Yes	—N/a	Yes	PC, Xbox One	May 19, 2017	
Absolute Drift: Zen Edition	Racing	Funselektor Labs	Flippfly	No	No	Yes	PC, Xbox One	Aug 25, 2017	
Abzû	Adventure	Giant Squid	505 Games	No	No	No	PC, Xbox One	June 2, 2017	
ACA Neogeo Alpha Mission II	Shooter	Hamster	Hamster	No	No	No	PC, Xbox One	February 27, 2018	
ACA Neogeo Art of Fighting	Fighting	Hamster	Hamster	No	No	No	PC, Xbox One	December 15, 2017	
ACA Neogeo Fatal Fury	Fighting	Hamster	Hamster	No	No	No	PC, Xbox One	December 15, 2017	
ACA Neogeo Fatal Fury 2	Fighting	Hamster	Hamster	No	No	No	PC, Xbox One	February 27, 2018	
ACA Neogeo Galaxy Fight: Universal Warriors	Fighting	Hamster	Hamster	No	No	No	PC, Xbox One	February 27, 2018	
ACA Neogeo King of the Monsters	Action	Hamster	Hamster	No	No	No	PC, Xbox One	February 27, 2018	
ACA Neogeo Last Resort	Shoot 'em up	Hamster	Hamster	No	No	No	PC, Xbox One	December 15, 2017	
ACA Neogeo Metal Slug	Run and gun	Hamster	Hamster	No	No	No	PC, Xbox One	December 15, 2017	
ACA Neogeo Metal Slug 2	Run and gun	Hamster	Hamster	No	No	No	PC, Xbox One	February 27, 2018	
ACA Neogeo Nam-1975	Action, Cabal shooter	Hamster	Hamster	No	No	No	PC, Xbox One	December 15, 2017	
ACA Neogeo Over Top	Racing	Hamster	Hamster	No	No	No	PC, Xbox One	December 15, 2017	
ACA Neogeo Samurai Shodown	Fighting	Hamster	Hamster	No	No	No	PC, Xbox One	February 27, 2018	
ACA Neogeo Sengoku	Fighting, Beat 'em up	Hamster	Hamster	No	No	No	PC, Xbox One	December 15, 2017	
ACA Neogeo The King of Fighters '94	Fighting	Hamster	Hamster	No	No	No	PC, Xbox One	December 15, 2017	
ACA Neogeo The King of Fighters '95	Fighting	Hamster	Hamster	No	No	No	PC, Xbox One	February 27, 2018	
ACA Neogeo The Last Blade	Fighting	Hamster	Hamster	No	No	No	PC, Xbox One	February 27, 2018	
ACA Neogeo Turf Masters	Sports	Hamster	Hamster	No	No	No	PC, Xbox One	December 28, 2017	
ACA Neogeo World Heroes	Fighting	Hamster	Hamster	No	No	No	PC, Xbox One	December 15, 2017	
ACA Neogeo World Heroes 2	Fighting	Hamster	Hamster	No	No	No	PC, Xbox One	February 27, 2018	
ACA Neogeo Zed Blade	Shoot 'em up	Hamster	Hamster	No	No	No	PC, Xbox One	February 27, 2018	
Age of Empires: Definitive Edition	Real-time strategy	Forgotten Empires	Xbox Game Studios	—N/a	—N/a	—N/a	PC	February 20, 2018	
Age of Empires II: Definitive Edition	Real-time strategy	Forgotten Empires, Tantalus Media	Xbox Game Studios	—N/a	—N/a	—N/a	PC	TBA	
Age of Empires III: Definitive Edition	Real-time strategy	Forgotten Empires	Xbox Game Studios	—N/a	—N/a	—N/a	PC	TBA	
Age of Empires IV	Real-time strategy	Relic Entertainment	Xbox Game Studios	—N/a	—N/a	—N/a	PC	TBA	
Among Us	Party, Social deduction	Innersloth	Innersloth	Yes	Yes	—N/a	PC, Xbox One, Xbox Series X/S	2018	
Apocalypse Cow	Adventure, Platformer	Monsters	Monsters	Yes	Yes	Yes	PC, Xbox One	2018	
Arizona Sunshine	FPS	Vertigo Games	Vertigo Games	—N/a	—N/a	—N/a	Windows Mixed Reality	Nov 14, 2017	
Ark: Survival Evolved	Action-adventure, Survival	Studio Wildcard	Studio Wildcard	Yes	Yes	Yes	PC, Xbox One	Dec 14, 2017	
Ashen	Action/RPG	Aurora 44	Annapurna Interactive	Yes	—N/a	Yes	PC, Xbox One	2018	
Astroneer	Adventure	System Era Softworks	System Era Softworks	Yes	Yes	Yes	PC, Xbox One	Dec 16, 2016	
Batman: The Enemy Within	Graphic adventure	Telltale Games	Telltale Games	No	No	No	PC, Xbox One	Aug 8, 2017	
Batman: The Telltale Series	Graphic adventure	Telltale Games	Telltale Games	No	No	No	PC, Xbox 360, Xbox One	Nov 7, 2016	
Battlerite	Team Arena Brawler	Stunlock Studios	Stunlock Studios	Yes	No	No	PC, Xbox One	2018	
Beat the Game	Adventure, Music	Worm Animation	Worm Animation	TBA	TBA	TBA	PC, Xbox One	2018	
Call of Duty: Infinite Warfare	First-person shooter	Infinity Ward	Activision	No	No	No	PC, Xbox One	Nov 4, 2016	
Call of Duty 4: Modern Warfare Remastered	First-person shooter	Infinity Ward	Activision	No	No	No	PC, Xbox One	Nov 4, 2016	
Can't Drive This	Racing	Pixel Maniacs	Pixel Maniacs	Yes	Yes	Yes	PC, Xbox One	2018	
Cities: Skylines	Simulation	Tantalus Media	Paradox Interactive	No	—N/a	Yes	PC, Xbox One	May 19, 2017	
Clouds & Sheep 2	Puzzle	HandyGames	HandyGames	No	—N/a	Yes	PC, Xbox One	Nov 3, 2017	
Crackdown 3	Action-adventure, Sandbox	Sumo Digital, Reagent Games (campaign mode), Elbow Rocket (Multiplayer mode)	Xbox Game Studios	Yes	Yes	Yes	PC, Xbox One	Feb 22, 2019	
Crystal Rift	Dungeon Crawler	Psytec Games	Psytec Games	—N/a	—N/a	—N/a	PC, Windows Mixed Reality	Jan 26, 2018	
Cuphead	Run and gun, platform	Studio MDHR	Studio MDHR	Yes	—N/a	Yes	PC, Xbox One	Sep 29, 2017	
Danger Goat	Platformer, Puzzle	nDreams	nDreams	—N/a	—N/a	—N/a	Windows Mixed Reality	Dec 8, 2017	
Dead by Daylight	Survival horror	Behaviour Interactive	Behaviour Interactive	No	Yes	Yes	PC, Xbox One, Xbox Series X/S	June 14, 2016	
Dead Rising 4	Action-adventure, Sandbox	Capcom Vancouver	Xbox Game Studios	No	No	No	PC, Xbox One	Dec 6, 2016	
Deep Rock Galactic	Shooter, Adventure	Ghost Ship Games	Coffee Stain Publishing	Yes	Yes	Yes	PC, Xbox One	Early Access	
Defend the Bits VR	Action, Strategy	Playside VR	Playside VR	—N/a	—N/a	—N/a	Windows Mixed Reality	Jan 31, 2018	
Defunct	Action-Adventure	Freshly Squeezed	SOEDESCO	Yes	—N/a	Yes	PC, Xbox One	Dec 19, 2017	
Disneyland Adventures	Open World, Adventure	Asobo Studio	Xbox Game Studios	Yes	—N/a	Yes	PC, Xbox One	Oct 31, 2017	
Disney Infinity 3.0	Action-adventure, sandbox	Avalanche Software	Disney Interactive Studios	No	No	No	PC, Xbox 360, Xbox One	Oct 29, 2015	
DJMax Respect V	Rhythm	Neowiz MUCA	Neowiz Games	Yes	Yes	Yes	PC, Xbox One, Xbox Series X/S	Jul 7, 2022	
Dragon Quest Builders 2	Action/RPG, Sandbox	Square-Enix	Square-Enix	Yes	TBA	Yes	PC, Xbox One, Xbox Series X	May 4, 2021	
Enter the Gungeon	Roguelike, shoot 'em up	Dodge Roll	Devolver Digital	Yes	—N/a	Yes	PC, Xbox One	Apr 5, 2017	
Everspace	Shooter	ROCKFISH Games	ROCKFISH Games	Yes	No	Yes	PC, Xbox One	Nov 22, 2016	
Fantastic Contraption	Puzzle	Radial Games	Radial Games	—N/a	—N/a	—N/a	Windows Mixed Reality	Dec 8, 2017	
Fearful Symmetry & The Cursed Prince	Puzzle	Gamera Interactive	SOEDESCO	Yes	—N/a	Yes	PC, Xbox One	Dec 12, 2017	
Fire: Ungh's Quest	Puzzle	Daedalic Entertainment	Daedalic Entertainment	—N/a	—N/a	—N/a	PC	Mar 4, 2016	
Floor Plan: Hands-On Edition	Puzzle, Adventure	Turbo Button	Turbo Button	—N/a	—N/a	—N/a	Windows Mixed Reality	Nov 3, 2017	
FORM	Adventure	Charm Games	Charm Games	—N/a	—N/a	—N/a	Windows Mixed Reality	Oct 17, 2017	
Forza Horizon 3	Racing	Playground Games	Xbox Game Studios	Yes	Yes	Yes	PC, Xbox One	Sep 27, 2016	
Forza Horizon 4	Racing	Playground Games	Xbox Game Studios	Yes	Yes	Yes	PC, Xbox One	Oct 2, 2018	
Forza Motorsport 7	Racing	Turn 10 Studios	Xbox Game Studios	Yes	Yes	Yes	PC, Xbox One	Oct 3, 2017	
Frostpunk	Survival, Strategy	11bit studios	11bit studios	TBA	TBA	TBA	PC	2018	
Full Metal Furies	Platform	Cellar Door Games	Cellar Door Games	Yes	Yes	Yes	PC, Xbox One	Jan 17, 2018	
Gears of War: Ultimate Edition	Third-person shooter	The Coalition	Xbox Game Studios	No	No	No	PC, Xbox One	Mar 1, 2016	
Gears of War 4	Third-person shooter	The Coalition	Xbox Game Studios	Yes	Yes	Yes	PC, Xbox One	Oct 11, 2016	
Gears 5	Third-person shooter	The Coalition	Xbox Game Studios	Yes	Yes	Yes	PC, Xbox One, Xbox Series X	Sep 10, 2019	
Gears Tactics	Turn-based strategy	Splash Damage	Xbox Game Studios	—N/a	—N/a	—N/a	PC	Apr 28, 2020	
Ghostlight Manor	Puzzle	Digital Future Lab	Digital Future Lab	TBA	TBA	TBA	PC	2018	
Gimme Five	Trivia	shuboarder	shuboarder	Yes	—N/a	Yes	PC, Windows Phone	Feb 2, 2017	
God of Light: Remastered	Puzzle	Playmous	Playmous	Yes	—N/a	Yes	PC, Xbox One	Oct 19, 2017	
Graveyard Keeper	Simulation	Lazy Bears Games	tinyBuild	TBA	TBA	TBA	PC, Xbox One	2018	
Guardians of the Galaxy: The Telltale Series	Graphic adventure, Interactive movie	Telltale Games	Telltale Games	No	No	No	PC, Xbox One	Apr 18, 2017	
Gunscape	First-person shooter	Blowfish Studios	Blowfish Studios	No	No	Yes	PC, Xbox One	Apr 4, 2016	
Halo Infinite	First-person shooter	343 Industries	Xbox Game Studios	Yes	Yes	Yes	PC, Xbox One, Xbox Series X	TBA	
Halo Wars: Definitive Edition	Strategy	343 Industries, Behaviour Interactive	Xbox Game Studios	Yes	No	Yes	PC, Xbox One	Apr 20, 2017	
Halo Wars 2	Strategy	343 Industries, Creative Assembly	Xbox Game Studios	Yes	Yes	Yes	PC, Xbox One	Feb 21, 2017	
Halo: The Master Chief Collection	First-person shooter	343 Industries	Xbox Game Studios	No	Yes	Yes (limited)	PC, Xbox One	Nov 11, 2014	
Harold Halibut	Adventure	Slow Bros.	Slow Bros.	Yes	—N/a	Yes	PC, Xbox One	2018	
Headbutt Factory	Puzzle	Gemdrops	Gemdrops	—N/a	—N/a	—N/a	Windows Mixed Reality	Feb 20, 2018	
Hellblade: Senua's Sacrifice	Action, hack and slash	Ninja Theory	Ninja Theory	No	—N/a	No	PC, Xbox One	Apr 17, 2018	
Hello Neighbor	Stealth, survival horror	Dynamic Pixels	tinyBuild	Yes	—N/a	Yes	PC, Xbox One	Dec 8, 2017	
Hitchhiker	Strategy	MatthewHall3D	MatthewHall3D	—N/a	—N/a	—N/a	PC	Mar 3, 2017	
I Expect You To Die	Adventure, Puzzle	Schell Games	Schell Games	—N/a	—N/a	—N/a	Windows Mixed Reality	Feb 13, 2018	
IDARB	Platformer	Other Ocean Interactive	Other Ocean Interactive	No	Yes	No	PC, Xbox One	Mar 4, 2016	
Injustice 2	Fighting	NetherRealm Studios	Warner Bros. Interactive Entertainment	No	No	No	PC, Xbox One	Nov 14, 2017	
Iris.Fall	Adventure, Puzzle	NEXT Studio	NEXT Studio	Yes	—N/a	Yes	PC, Xbox One	2018	
Kholat	Adventure, Horror	IMGN.PRO	IMGN.PRO	No	No	Yes	PC, Xbox One	Sep 22, 2017	
Kyub	Puzzle	Ninja Egg	Ninja Egg	No	No	Yes	PC, Xbox One	Jan 17, 2017	
Little Triangle	Action, Platformer	CottonGame	Dreamoji	Yes	No	Yes	PC, Xbox One	Feb 7, 2018	
Luna	Puzzle	Funomena	Funomena	—N/a	—N/a	—N/a	Windows Mixed Reality	Oct 17, 2017	
Mages of Mystralia	Adventure	Borealys Games	Borealys Games	TBA	TBA	TBA	PC, Xbox One	2018	
Marvel vs. Capcom: Infinite	Fighting	Capcom	Capcom	Yes	Yes	Yes	PC, Xbox One	Feb 26, 2018	
Metro Exodus	Action & Adventure	4A Games	Deep Silver	TBA	TBA	TBA	PC, Xbox One	2018	
Microsoft Flight Simulator (2020 video game)	Simulation	Asobo Studio	Xbox Game Studios	Yes	Yes	Yes	PC, Xbox Series X	Aug 18, 2020	
Middle-earth: Shadow of War	Graphic adventure	Monolith Productions	Warner Bros. Interactive Entertainment	Yes	—N/a	Yes	PC, Xbox One	Oct 10, 2017	
Minecraft: Story Mode	Graphic adventure	Telltale Games	Telltale Games	No	No	No	PC, Xbox 360, Xbox One	Dec 17, 2015	
Minecraft: Story Mode - Season Two	Graphic adventure	Telltale Games	Telltale Games	No	No	No	PC, Xbox 360, Xbox One	Jul 11, 2017	
Minecraft: Windows 10 Edition	Sandbox, survival	Xbox Game Studios, Mojang	Xbox Game Studios	No	Yes	No	PC, Xbox 360, Xbox One	Jul 29, 2015	
Monster Buster: Agency	RPG	Tag of Joy	Tag of Joy	TBA	TBA	TBA	PC, Windows Phone, Xbox One	2018	
Moonlighter	Action RPG	Digital Sun Games	11bit Studios	Yes	TBA	Yes	PC, Xbox One	2018	
Nothing to Fear	Puzzle, Adventure	Dlala Studios	Dlala Studios	TBA	TBA	TBA	PC, Xbox One	2018	
Ooblets	RPG	Glumberland	Double Fine Productions	Yes	TBA	Yes	PC, Xbox One	2018	
Ori and the Blind Forest: Definitive Edition	Platform adventure, metroidvania	Moon Studios	Xbox Game Studios	No	No	Yes	PC, Xbox One	Apr 27, 2016	
Ori and the Will of the Wisps	Platform adventure, metroidvania	Moon Studios	Xbox Game Studios	Yes	—N/a	Yes	PC, Xbox One	2018	
Overdriven Reloaded: Special Edition	Shooter	TOMAGameStudio	TOMAGameStudio	Yes	—N/a	Yes	PC, Xbox One	Feb 9, 2018	
Oxenfree	Adventure	Night School Studio	Night School Studio	No	No	No	PC, Xbox One	Feb 17, 2016	
Phantom Trigger	Action & Adventure	Bread Team	tinyBuild	Yes	—N/a	Yes	PC, Xbox One	Apr 20, 2018	
Pinball FX 2 VR	Pinball	Zen Studios	Zen Studios	—N/a	—N/a	—N/a	Windows Mixed Reality	Nov 21, 2017	
Pinbrawl	Pinball, Arena	Northern Heart	Northern Heart	Yes	Yes	Yes	PC, Xbox One	2018	
Pit People	RPG, Strategy	The Behemoth	The Behemoth	No	No	No	PC, Xbox One	2018	
Poi: Windows 10 Edition	Platformer	PolyKid	PolyKid	No	No	No	PC, Xbox One	Feb 27, 2017	
Quantum Break	Action-adventure, third-person shooter	Remedy Entertainment	Xbox Game Studios	No	—N/a	Yes	PC, Xbox One	Apr 5, 2016	
Q.U.B.E 2	Puzzle	Toxic Games	Toxic Games	TBA	TBA	TBA	PC, Xbox One	2018	
Raiders of the Broken Planet	Action-adventure	MercurySteam	MercurySteam	Yes	TBA	Yes	PC, Xbox One	Sep 22, 2017	
Raining Blobs	Puzzle	Endi Milojkoski	Endi Milojkoski	Yes	—N/a	Yes	PC, Xbox One	Dec 20, 2017	
ReCore	Action-adventure	Comcept; Armature Studio	Xbox Game Studios	Yes	—N/a	Yes	PC, Xbox One	Sep 13, 2016	
Resident Evil 7	Action-adventure	Capcom	Capcom	Yes	No	Yes	PC, Xbox One	Jan 24, 2017	
Rise of Nations: Extended Edition	Real-time strategy	SkyBox Labs, Big Huge Games	Xbox Game Studios	—N/a	STEAM, WinStore	—N/a	PC	Sep 14, 2017	
Rise of the Tomb Raider	Action-adventure	Crystal Dynamics	Square Enix	No	No	No	PC, Xbox One	Jan 28, 2016	
Riptide GP: Renegade	Racing	Vector Unit	Vector Unit	Yes	Yes	Yes	PC, Xbox One	Feb 24, 2017	
Robocraft Infinity	Sandbox, Fighting	Freejam	Freejam	Yes	TBA	Yes	PC, Xbox One	Apr 11, 2018	
Rocket Riot	Shooter	Codeglue	Codeglue	Yes	—N/a	Yes	PC, Windows Phone	Oct 19, 2016	
Romancing SaGa 2 Remastered	Role-playing	Square Enix	Square Enix	Yes	—N/a	Yes	PC, Xbox One	Dec 15, 2017	
Ruiner	Shooter	Reikon Games	Devolver Digital	Yes	—N/a	Yes	PC, Xbox One	Sep 26, 2017	
Rush: A Disney Pixar Adventure	Open World, Adventure	Asobo Studio	Xbox Game Studios	Yes	—N/a	Yes	PC, Xbox One	Oct 31, 2017	
Runestone Keeper	Action & Adventure	Blackfire Games	E-Home Entertainment	Yes	—N/a	Yes	PC, Xbox One	Apr 25, 2018	
Samsara	Puzzle	Marker	Marker	Yes	—N/a	Yes	PC, Xbox One	Feb 7, 2018	
Sea of Thieves	Adventure	Rare	Xbox Game Studios	Yes	Yes	Yes	PC, Xbox One	Mar 20, 2018	
Shadow Complex: Remastered	Adventure game	Chair Entertainment	Epic Games	No	No	Yes	PC, Xbox One	May 3, 2016	
Sheltered	Action adventure	Unicube	Team17	No	No	No	PC, Xbox One	May 27, 2016	
Shovel Knight: Treasure Trove	Action, Platform	Yacht Club Games	Yacht Club Games	No	No	No	PC, Xbox One	Aug 25, 2017	
Siegecraft Commander	Tower Defense	Blowfish Studios	Blowfish Studios	No	No	Yes	PC, Xbox One	Jan 23, 2017	
Silence: The Whispering World 2	Adventure	Daedalic Entertainment	Daedalic Entertainment	Yes	—N/a	Yes	PC, Xbox One	Jan 30, 2017	
Slime Rancher	Action Adventure	Monomi Park	Monomi Park	Yes	No	No	PC, Xbox One	2018	
Snake Pass	Platformer	Sumo Digital	Sumo Digital	Yes	—N/a	Yes	PC, Xbox One	Mar 28, 2017	
Songbringer	Action RPG	Wizard Fu	Double Eleven	Yes	—N/a	Yes	PC, Xbox One	Sep 1, 2017	
Space Pirate Trainer	FPS	I-Illusions	I-Illusions	—N/a	—N/a	—N/a	Windows Mixed Reality	Oct 16, 2017	
Spheroids	Platformer	Eclipse Games	Eclipse Games	Yes	—N/a	Yes	PC, Xbox One	Jan 20, 2017	
Squadron 51	Shoot 'em up	Loomiarts	Loomiarts	Yes	—N/a	Yes	PC, Xbox One	2018	
Starbound	Action-adventure	Chucklefish	Chucklefish	TBA	TBA	TBA	PC, Xbox One	2018	
State of Decay 2	Stealth, survival horror, role-playing, third-person shooter, simulation	Undead Labs	Xbox Game Studios	Yes	Yes	Yes	PC, Xbox One	May 22, 2018	
Stealth Inc 2: A Game of Clones	Platform, stealth	Curve Studios	Curve Digital	No	No	No	PC, Xbox One	Nov 20, 2015	
Stunt Kite Masters	Simulation, Action	HandyGames	HandyGames	—N/a	—N/a	—N/a	Windows Mixed Reality	Dec 5, 2017	
Super Dungeon Bros	RPG	React Games	Wired Productions	No	No	Yes	PC, Xbox One	Aug 8, 2017	
Super Lucky's Tale	Platform	Playful Corp	Xbox Game Studios	Yes	—N/a	Yes	PC, Xbox One	Nov 7, 2017	
Superhot VR	First-person shooter	Superhot Team	Superhot Team	—N/a	—N/a	—N/a	Windows Mixed Reality	Oct 17, 2017	
Supermarket Shriek	Racing	Billy Goat Entertainment	Billy Goat Entertainment	Yes	—N/a	Yes	PC, Xbox One	2018	
Tachyon Project	Shooter	Eclipse Games	Eclipse Games	Yes	—N/a	Yes	PC, Xbox One	Jun 8, 2017	
Tacoma	Adventure	Fullbright	Fullbright	Yes	—N/a	Yes	PC, Xbox One	Dec 12, 2017	
Tee Time Golf	Sport	Barkers Crest Studio	Barkers Crest Studio	—N/a	—N/a	—N/a	PC, Windows Mixed Reality	Jan 10, 2018	
The Artful Escape of Francis Vendetti	Adventure	Beethoven and Dinosaur	Annapurna Interactive	TBA	TBA	TBA	PC, Xbox One	2018	
The Darwin Project	Arena, Survival	Scavenger Studio	Scavenger Studio	TBA	TBA	TBA	PC, Xbox One	2018	
The Escapists: The Walking Dead	Strategy	Skybound Entertainment	Team17	No	No	No	PC, Xbox One	May 4, 2016	
The Food Run	Puzzle	Battenberg Software	Battenberg Software	Yes	—N/a	Yes	PC, Windows Phone	Sep 25, 2017	
The Last Night	Adventure	Odd Tales	Raw Fury	TBA	TBA	TBA	PC, Xbox One	2018	
The Little Acre	Adventure	Pewter Game Studios	Curve Digital	TBA	TBA	TBA	PC, Xbox One	2018	
The Long Dark	Survival	Hinterland Games	Hinterland Games	Yes	—N/a	Yes	PC, Xbox One	Nov 2, 2017	
Thomas & Friends: Wonders of Sodor	Adventure, simulation	Dovetail Games	Dovetail Games	—N/a	—N/a	—N/a	PC, Xbox One	Mar 17, 2026	
The Turing Test	Puzzle	Bulkhead Interactive	Bulkhead Interactive	No	No	Yes	PC, Xbox One	Nov 28, 2016	
Thimbleweed Park	Point-and-click adventure	Terrible Toybox	Terrible Toybox	Yes	—N/a	Yes	PC, Xbox One	May 6, 2017	
The Walking Dead: A New Frontier	Graphic adventure, interactive movie	Telltale Games	Telltale Games	No	No	No	PC, Xbox One	Dec 20, 2016	
The Walking Dead: Michonne	Graphic adventure, interactive movie	Telltale Games	Telltale Games	No	No	No	PC, Xbox 360, Xbox One	Sep 7, 2016	
The Walking Dead: Season One	Graphic adventure, Interactive movie	Telltale Games	Telltale Games	No	No	No	PC, Xbox 360, Xbox One	Feb 25, 2017	
The Walking Dead: Season Two	Graphic adventure, Interactive movie	Telltale Games	Telltale Games	No	No	No	PC, Xbox 360, Xbox One	Mar 9, 2017	
The Wolf Among Us	Graphic adventure	Telltale Games	Telltale Games	No	No	No	PC, Xbox 360, Xbox One	Apr 6, 2017	
Thumper	Music, rhythm	Drool	Drool	No	—N/a	Yes	PC, Xbox One	Oct 18, 2017	
Titan Slayer	First-person shooter	COLOPL	COLOPL	—N/a	—N/a	—N/a	Windows Mixed Reality	Apr 20, 2018	
TorqueL	Platformer	FullPowerSideAttack	FullPowerSideAttack	No	—N/a	Yes	PC, Xbox One	Oct 17, 2017	
Tower 57	Shooter	11bit Studios	11bit Studios	Yes	TBA	Yes	PC, Xbox One	2018	
Train Sim World: CSX Heavy Haul	Simulator	Dovetail Games	Dovetail Games	No	No	No	PC, Xbox One	Nov 16, 2017	
Ultrawings	Simulation	Bit Planet Games	Bit Planet Games	—N/a	—N/a	—N/a	Windows Mixed Reality	Mar 16, 2018	
VALA: Vicious Attack Llama Apocalypse	Shooter	RogueCode	RogueCode	Yes	No	Yes	PC, Xbox One	Mar 16, 2018	
Virgo Vs. The Zodiac	RPG	Moonana	Moonana	Yes	—N/a	Yes	PC, Xbox One	2018	
Voodoo Vince Remastered	Platformer	Beep Games, Inc.	Beep Games, Inc.	Yes	—N/a	Yes	PC, Xbox One	Apr 18, 2017	
Wargroove	Turn Based, Tactical	Chucklefish	Chucklefish	Yes	TBA	Yes	PC, Xbox One	2018	
Wasteland 2: Director's Cut	Role-playing	inXile Entertainment	inXile Entertainment	No	No	No	PC, Xbox One	Nov 10, 2016	
Windlands	Action	Psytec Games	Psytec Games	—N/a	—N/a	—N/a	Windows Mixed Reality	Jan 5, 2018	
X-Morph: Defense	Twin-stick shooter, tower defense	EXOR Studios	EXOR Studios	No	No	No	PC, Xbox One	Jan 26, 2018	
Yooka-Laylee	3D Platformer	Playtonic Games	Team17	No	No	No	PC, Xbox One	Jun 5, 2017	
Yoku's Island Express	Pinball, Adventure	Villa Gorilla	Team17	Yes	TBA	Yes	PC, Xbox One	2018	
Zoo Tycoon: Ultimate Animal Collection	Business simulation	Asobo Studio	Xbox Game Studios	Yes	—N/a	Yes	PC, Xbox One	Oct 31, 2017	

=== Free-to-play ===
Title	Genre(s)	Developer(s)	Publisher(s)	Cross buy	Cross play	Cross save	Platform(s)	Release Date	Ref.
2020: My Country	Simulation	Game Insight	Game Insight	Yes	—N/a	Yes	PC, Windows Phone	Aug 28, 2016	
Age of Empires: Castle Siege	Strategy, Tower-defense	Smoking Gun Interactive	Xbox Game Studios	Yes	Yes	Yes	PC, Windows Phone (delisted, servers shutdown)	Aug 27, 2015	
Alto's Adventure	Endless runner	Snowman	Snowman	—N/a	—N/a	—N/a	PC	Jul 8, 2016	
Animated Puzzles Star	Puzzle	Mexond	Mexond	Yes	—N/a	Yes	PC, Windows Phone	Dec 14, 2016	
Asphalt Legends	Racing	Gameloft	Gameloft	Yes	Yes	Yes	PC, Xbox One, Xbox Series X/S	July 17, 2018 (Debut as Asphalt 9: Legends)	
Cosmo Run	Action, Adventure, Endless Runner	No Six Five	No Six Five	Yes	—N/a	Yes	PC, Windows Phone	Oct 13, 2016	
Fable Fortune	Collectible card game	Flaming Foul Studios, Mediatonic	Mediatonic	Yes	Yes	Yes	PC, Xbox One	Feb 22, 2018	
Fallout Shelter	Role playing, Simulation	Bethesda Game Studios	Bethesda Softworks	Yes	—N/a	Yes	PC, Xbox One	Feb 7, 2017	
Final Fantasy XV: Pocket Edition	RPG	Square Enix	Square Enix	—N/a	—N/a	—N/a	PC	Jun 6, 2018	
Fortnite	Survival, Battle Royale, Sandbox	Epic Games	Epic Games	Yes	Yes	Yes	PC, Xbox One, Xbox Series X/S	July 25, 2017	
Forza Motorsport 6: Apex	Racing	Turn 10 Studios	Xbox Game Studios	—N/a	—N/a	—N/a	PC (delisted)	May 5, 2016	
Gigantic	Third-person shooter	Motiga	Perfect World Entertainment	Yes	Yes	Yes	PC, Xbox One	Dec 8, 2016	
Gwent: The Witcher Card Game	Collectible card game	CD Projekt Red	CD Projekt SA	Yes	Yes	Yes	PC, Xbox One	2018	
Halo 5: Forge	First-person shooter	343 Industries	Xbox Game Studios	Yes	No	Yes	PC, Xbox One	Sep 8, 2016	
Happy Wars	Action, tactical role-playing	Toylogic	Toylogic	PC, XBO	PC, XBO	PC, XBO	PC, Xbox 360, Xbox One	Dec 15, 2016	
Heart Box	Puzzle	Rad Brothers	Rad Brothers	—N/a	No	—N/a	PC	Dec 21, 2018	
Killer Instinct	Fighting	Iron Galaxy Studios	Xbox Game Studios	Yes	Yes	Yes	PC, Xbox One	Mar 29, 2016	
Forza Street	Racing	Electric Square	Xbox Game Studios	—N/a	No	—N/a	PC	May 22, 2018	
Microsoft Mahjong	Card game	Arkadium, Microsoft Casual Games	Xbox Game Studios	Yes	—N/a	Yes	PC, Windows Phone	Oct 14, 2016	
Microsoft Bingo	Card game	Frima Studio	Xbox Game Studios	Yes	—N/a	Yes	PC, Windows Phone	Oct 7, 2015	
Microsoft Solitaire Collection	Card game	Arkadium, Microsoft Casual Games, Smoking Gun Interactive	Xbox Game Studios	Yes	—N/a	Yes	PC, Windows Phone, iOS, Android	Jul 29, 2015	
Microsoft Sudoku	Number game	Arkadium, Microsoft Casual Games	Xbox Game Studios	Yes	—N/a	Yes	PC, Windows Phone, iOS, Android	Mar 17, 2020	
Microsoft Ultimate Word Games	Card game	Behaviour Interactive	Xbox Game Studios	Yes	—N/a	Yes	PC, Windows Phone	Jun 6, 2017	
Modern Combat 5: Blackout	First-person shooter	Gameloft	Gameloft				PC, Windows Phone	July 21, 2014	
Phantom Dust HD	Action, Strategy	Code Mystics	Xbox Game Studios	Yes	Yes	Yes	PC, Xbox One	May 16, 2017	
Pinball FX 2	Pinball	Zen Studios	Zen Studios	PC, XBO	No	No	PC, Xbox 360, Xbox One	Oct 9, 2015	
Pinball FX 3	Pinball	Zen Studios	Zen Studios	Yes	Yes	Yes	PC, Xbox One	Sep 26, 2017	
T-Kara Puzzles	Puzzle	Mexond	Mexond	Yes	—N/a	Yes	PC, Windows Phone	Sep 1, 2017	
Tapping Skill Test	Action, adventure	Triangle Service	Triangle Service	—N/a	—N/a	—N/a	PC	Nov 29, 2017	
Turtle's Quest	Action, Adventure	Spike Productions	Spike Productions	—N/a	—N/a	—N/a	PC (delisted)	Sep 7, 2017	
War Planet Online: Global Conquest	Strategy	Gameloft	Gameloft	Yes	Yes	Yes	PC, Windows Phone	Sep 1, 2017	
WORLDS Builder: Farm & Craft	Simulation	JoyBits	JoyBits	—N/a	—N/a	—N/a	PC	Feb 26, 2018	

== See also ==
- List of Games for Windows – Live titles
- List of Xbox 360 games compatible with Xbox One
- List of Xbox Live games on Windows 8.x
- List of Xbox One applications
- List of Xbox One games
- List of Xbox Play Anywhere games
