= List of Xbox 360 applications =

Xbox 360 applications are non-game software applications designed to run on the Xbox 360 platform. Xbox 360 applications can either be stored on the console's hard disk drive or on a USB flash drive. Often, an Xbox Live Gold membership is also required to access some applications, as well as subscriptions correspondent to the applications. Some of these applications are country specific. (Note: Certain region specific applications, such as Sky Go, can be downloaded by overseas subscribers via an account based on the region the application is available in. Most applications are region-locked and can only be downloaded in that region.)

Note, this list is dated as the Xbox 360 Store shut down on July 29, 2024, thus these apps can no longer be downloaded, and a large majority of them no longer function as of July 2022.

== List ==
| Name | Available countries | Category | Date |
|---|---|---|---|
| Netflix (replaced by new version) | Canada, Ireland, Mexico, United Kingdom, United States, Russia, | Video | November 19, 2008 |
| Facebook (removed from store and inactive) | N/A | Social | November 17, 2009 |
| Twitter (removed from store) | N/A | Social | November 17, 2009 |
| Last.fm (removed from store) | United States, United Kingdom | Music | November 17, 2009 |
| Zune (replaced by Groove Music + Movies & TV.) | Music: United States, United Kingdom, France, Italy, Spain, Germany, Canada, Australia; Zune Music Pass: United States, United Kingdom, France, Italy, Spain, Canada, Australia; TV: United States, Canada, Movie Rental: United States, United Kingdom, France, Italy, Spain, Germany, Austria, Japan, Canada, Australia, New Zealand, Mexico; Movie Purchase: United States, United Kingdom, France, Germany, Canada, Australia, New Zealand, Japan | Video, Music | November 17, 2009 |
| Sky Player | United Kingdom | TV | October 27, 2009 |
| Vodafone Casa TV | Portugal | TV | December 17, 2009 |
| Optik TV | Canada | TV | August 4, 2010 |
| ESPN (removed from store) | United States | Video | November 1, 2010 |
| Foxtel | Australia | TV | November 1, 2010 |
| Video Kinect (rendered videoKINECT) | N/A | Social | November 1, 2010 |
| Hulu Plus (replaced by new version) | United States | Video | April 29, 2011 |
| BYUtv | United States | TV | April 22, 2014 |
| Sky Go (Note: This is the new version of Sky Player, because Sky Player was renamed as Sky Go after July 6, 2011 with the launch of some new features and limited to 2 devices registered from 4.) | United Kingdom | TV | June 7, 2011 |
| EPIX | United States | Video | December 6, 2011 |
| ESPN on Xbox Live (removed from store) | United States | Video | December 6, 2011 |
| Hulu | Japan | Video | December 6, 2011 |
| Hulu Plus (new version) | United States | Video | December 6, 2011 |
| LoveFilm | United Kingdom | Video | December 6, 2011 |
| Netflix (new version) | Brazil, Canada, Chile, Colombia, Mexico, United Kingdom, United States, Russia | Video | December 6, 2011 |
| Premium Play by (MediaSet) | Italy | Video | December 6, 2011 |
| Sky Go (SkyDE) | Germany | TV | December 6, 2011 |
| Movistar TV (Movistar) | Spain | TV | December 6, 2011 |
| TODAY (MSNBC) | United States | Video | December 6, 2011 |
| blinkbox | United Kingdom | Video | December 13, 2011 |
| iHeartRadio (Clear Channel) | United States | Music | December 13, 2011 |
| MSN | Canada, Germany, Italy, Mexico, and United Kingdom | Video | December 13, 2011 |
| MSNBC.com | United States | Video | December 13, 2011 |
| MUZU.TV | Belgium, Denmark, Finland, France, Germany, Ireland, Italy, Netherlands, Norway, Spain, Sweden and United Kingdom | Music | December 13, 2011 |
| ninemsn (inactive) | Australia | Video | December 13, 2011 |
| Rogers On Demand Online (Rogers Media) | Canada | Video | December 13, 2011 |
| SBS ON DEMAND (removed from store) | Australia | TV | December 13, 2011 |
| TMZ | Canada, United States | Video | December 13, 2011 |
| RTVE | Spain | Video | December 13, 2011 |
| Verizon Fios TV (removed from store) | United States | TV | December 13, 2011 |
| YouTube | Available in 24 countries globally | Video | December 13, 2011 |
| 4 on Demand (C4) | United Kingdom | Video | December 20, 2011 |
| ABC iview (Discontinued in 2018) | Australia | Video | December 20, 2011 |
| Dailymotion | Available in 34 countries globally | Video | December 20, 2011 |
| Demand 5 (Five) | United Kingdom (Note: Users can download Demand 5 in the United States via a UK Xbox Live Free account and accessed (and its programmes can be viewed; unlike on the website) using the native US Gold account.) | TV | December 20, 2011 |
| M6 (Astral Media) | France | TV | December 20, 2011 |
| MSN Video | France | Video | December 20, 2011 |
| UFC on Xbox Live | Canada, United States, Russia | Video | December 20, 2011 |
| Vudu (Walmart) | United States | Video | December 20, 2011 |
| Astral Media’s Disney XD (Astral Media) | Canada | Video | January 17, 2012 |
| Mediathek/ZDF | Germany | Video | January 17, 2012 |
| Real Sports (Maple Leaf Sports) | Canada | Video | January 17, 2012 |
| CinemaNow (Best Buy) | United States | Video | January 24, 2012 |
| Crackle (Sony Pictures) | Australia, Canada, United Kingdom, United States | Video | January 31, 2012 |
| Vevo | Australia, Canada, Ireland, United Kingdom, United States | Music | March 6, 2012 |
| AlloCiné | France (AlloCiné), Germany (Filmstarts), Spain (Sensacine), United Kingdom (Screenrush) | Video | March 13, 2012 |
| BBC iPlayer | United Kingdom | TV | March 20, 2012 |
| HBO Go | United States | Video | March 27, 2012 |
| MLB.TV (MLB Advanced Media) | Canada, Mexico, United States | Video | March 27, 2012 |
| Xbox Live Event Player | 2012 Revolver Golden Gods (April 7): Belgium, Canada, Denmark, Finland, Germany, Ireland, Norway, Sweden, United Kingdom, United States; Xbox E3 2012 Media Briefing (June 4): Available in all countries; Miss Teen USA 2012 (July 27): Australia, Brazil, Canada, Chile, Colombia, France, Germany, Ireland, Italy, Mexico, New Zealand, Poland, South Africa, Spain, United Kingdom, United States | Video | March 27, 2012 |
| Xfinity On Demand (Comcast) | United States | TV | March 27, 2012 |
| YOMVI (Canal+) | Spain | Video | April 3, 2012 |
| Orange TV | France | TV | April 16, 2012 |
| MLB.TV (MLB Advanced Media) | Australia, Brazil, Chile, Colombia, Czech Republic, France, Germany, India, Ireland, Italy, Netherlands, New Zealand, Poland, Russia, South Africa, Spain, Sweden, United Kingdom | Video | May 8, 2012 |
| Manga Entertainment (Starz) | United States | Video | May 16, 2012 |
| MUZU.TV | Canada, United States | Music | May 16, 2012 |
| Amazon Video (removed from store) | United States | Video | May 29, 2012 |
| Antena 3 | Spain | TV | May 29, 2012 |
| MLB.TV (MLB Advanced Media) | Hong Kong, Japan, South Korea, Singapore, Taiwan | Video | May 29, 2012 |
| MUZU.TV | Australia, New Zealand | Music | May 29, 2012 |
| Paramount Movies | United States | Video | June 12, 2012 |
| Kinect PlayFit | Available in all countries (except Russia, etc.) | Social | July 10, 2012 |
| NBC News | United States | Video | August 21, 2012 |
| Now TV | United Kingdom | TV | August 21, 2012 |
| Wuaki.tv | Spain | Video | August 29, 2012 |
| Sony Pictures | United States | Video | September 5, 2012 |
| Kinect Sesame Street TV | Australia, Canada, Hong Kong, Ireland, New Zealand, Singapore, United Kingdom, United States | Video | September 18, 2012 |
| Kinect Nat Geo TV | Australia, Canada, Hong Kong, Ireland, New Zealand, Singapore, United Arab Emirates, United Kingdom, United States | Video | September 18, 2012 |
| Fox Broadcast | United States | Video | September 25, 2012 |
| L'Oréal-The Next Level | United States | Social | October 2, 2012 |
| IGN | United Kingdom | Video | October 9, 2012 |
| GameSpot TV | Australia, Canada, Ireland, New Zealand, United Kingdom, United States | Video | October 9, 2012 |
| Internet Explorer | Available in all countries | Web Browser | October 16, 2012 |
| Groove Music | Available in all countries (except Russia, etc.) | Music | October 16, 2012 |
| Movies & TV | Available in all countries (except Russia) | Video | October 16, 2012 |
| NBA Game Time with NBA.com League Pass Broadband | United States | Video | October 22, 2012 |
| NBA Game Time | Available in all countries (except United States) | Video | October 30, 2012 |
| Mustang Customizer (Ford) | United States | Social | October 31, 2012 |
| Gol Stadium | Spain | Video | October 31, 2012 |
| WSJ Live | Australia, Austria, Belgium, Brazil, Canada, Chile, Colombia, Czech Republic, Denmark, Finland, France, Germany, Greece, Hong Kong, Hungary, India, Ireland, Italy, Japan, Korea, Mexico, Netherlands, New Zealand, Norway, Poland, Portugal, South Africa, Singapore, Slovakia, Spain, Sweden, Switzerland, Taiwan, United Kingdom, United States | Video | October 31, 2012 |
| Gulli Replay | France | Video | November 13, 2012 |
| Quickflix | Australia, New Zealand | Video | November 13, 2012 |
| Absolute Radio | United Kingdom | Music | November 21, 2012 |
| MUZU.TV | Austria, Switzerland | Music | November 21, 2012 |
| UVideos (Univision) | United States | Video | November 21, 2012 |
| Vevo | Brazil | Video | November 21, 2012 |
| Blip.TV (shutdown as of August 2015) | United States | Video | December 5, 2012 |
| IGN | Canada | Video | December 5, 2012 |
| LoveFilm | Germany | Video | December 5, 2012 |
| Rhapsody | United States | Music | December 5, 2012 |
| RTL XL | Netherlands | Video | December 5, 2012 |
| TOU.TV | Canada | Video | December 5, 2012 |
| arte | Germany, France | Video | December 11, 2012 |
| CinemaNow (Best Buy) | Canada | Video | December 11, 2012 |
| CNET | Canada, United States | Video | December 11, 2012 |
| Karaoke | Available in all countries (except Japan and United Arab Emirates) (shutdown in August 2014) | Social | December 11, 2012 |
| Maxim | United States | Video | December 11, 2012 |
| Napster | Germany, United Kingdom | Music | December 11, 2012 |
| SkyDrive (Updated to OneDrive and inactive) | Available in all countries (except Russia) | Social | December 11, 2012 |
| Sport1 | Austria, Germany | Video | December 11, 2012 |
| Vevo | Spain, Italy, France | Music | December 11, 2012 |
| Zattoo | Germany | Video | December 11, 2012 |
| Sports Picks | Available in all countries | Video | December 14, 2012 |
| AOL On | United States | Video | December 18, 2012 |
| Azteca | Mexico | Video | December 18, 2012 |
| Crunchyroll | Available in all countries (except Japan, United Arab Emirates, Slovakia, Saudi Arabia) | Video | December 18, 2012 |
| IGN | Australia, New Zealand | Video | December 18, 2012 |
| SnagFilms | United States | Video | December 18, 2012 |
| Televisa | Mexico | Video | December 18, 2012 |
| Viaplay | Denmark, Finland, Norway, Sweden | Video | December 18, 2012 |
| Vimeo | United States | Video | December 18, 2012 |
| NHL GameCenter LIVE | Available in all countries (except Denmark, Finland, Norway, Sweden) | Video | January 18, 2013 |
| Slacker Radio | Canada, United States | Music | February 26, 2013 |
| Zona Latina | United States | Video | February 26, 2013 |
| GameTrailers | Australia, Canada, Germany, Spain, France, Italy, Japan, Mexico, United Kingdom, United States (delisted) | Video | March 19, 2013 |
| Redbox Instant by Verizon | United States | Video | March 19, 2013 |
| IndieFlix | Australia, Canada, Ireland, New Zealand, United Kingdom, United States | Video | March 26, 2013 |
| PopcornFlix | United States | Video | March 26, 2013 |
| Revision3 | Canada, United Kingdom, United States | Video | March 26, 2013 |
| Toys "R" Us Movies | United States | Video | March 26, 2013 |
| WWE on Xbox Live | United States, Russia | Video | April 2, 2013 |
| CBC's Hockey Night In Canada | Canada | Video | April 11, 2013 |
| Sainsbury's | United Kingdom | | April 11, 2013 |
| Flixster | United States | Video | April 16, 2013 |
| The CW Network (removed from store) | United States | Video | April 23, 2013 |
| Pizza Hut (removed from store) | United States | Social | April 23, 2013 |
| Machinima | Available in all countries (delisted) | Video | April 30, 2013 |
| Twitch (removed from store and inactive) | United States | Video | May 14, 2013 |
| Deezer | Austria, Belgium, Czech Republic, Germany, Denmark, Finland, France, Ireland, Italy, Netherlands, Norway, Poland, Portugal, Russia, Slovakia, Spain, Sweden, Switzerland, United Kingdom (delisted) | Music | May 28, 2013 |
| OneBeat | Canada, United Kingdom, United States, Zimbabwe | Video | May 28, 2013 |
| Disney | United States | Video | June 19, 2013 |
| Comedy Central Stand-Up | United States | Video | June 30, 2013 |
| Nickelodeon | United States | Video | June 30, 2013 |
| Ameba | United States, Canada | Video | August 21, 2013 |
| Target Ticket (discontinued as of March 2015 ) | United States | Movies/TV Rental | September 25, 2013 |
| Tenplay (discontinued) | Australia | TV | September 29, 2013 |
| WeatherNation TV | Global | Live Broadcast / Weather Data / Weather Forecast | October 8, 2014 |
| Twitch | Available in all countries | Movies / TV | October 8, 2014 |
| Smosh (inactive) | United States | Entertainment | November 20, 2014 |

== See also ==
- List of Xbox One and Series X/S applications
- List of Xbox 360 games
- Xbox Live Event Player
