= List of Xbox One games =

This is a list of Xbox One games planned or released either at retail or via download. (Note: For a chronological reason, click the sort button in any of the available region's columns. Games dated November 22, 2013 (North America and Europe) and September 4, 2014 (Japan) are launch titles for the specified regions.) There are currently 3067 games on both parts of this list. (Note: This number is always up to date by this script.)

== See also ==
- List of backward-compatible games for Xbox One and Series X/S
- List of Xbox One X enhanced games
- List of Xbox One and Series X/S applications
- List of Xbox Live games on Windows 10
