= Snake Pass (video game) =

2017 video game

- Developer: Sumo Digital
- Publisher: Sumo Digital
- Designers: Phill Bennett; Bradley Davey; Sebastiaan Liese
- Programmers: Brendan Burns; Peter Harrap
- Artist: Andy Ritson
- Composer: David Wise
- Engine: Unreal Engine 4
- Platforms: Nintendo Switch, PlayStation 4, Windows, Xbox One
- Release: NA: 28 March 2017; AU: 29 March 2017; EU: 29 March 2017
- Genre: Puzzle-platform
- Mode: Single-player

Snake Pass is a puzzle-platform game developed and published by Sumo Digital for Nintendo Switch, PlayStation 4, Windows, and Xbox One. Players play as a snake traversing floating islands in themed levels. Despite being a platform game, the player cannot jump and has to slither similarly to a real snake. The game was released in North America, Europe, and Australia in March 2017.

== Gameplay ==
The main character, Noodle, navigates by coiling around objects.

Snake Pass is a 3D puzzle-platform game where players play as a coral snake named Noodle with his hummingbird sidekick named Doodle. The game has 15 levels across four themed worlds. It takes place in the fictional jungle setting of Haven Tor. The first world is themed around the jungle, the second around water, the third around lava, and the fourth around winds. Each world contains four levels, except for the final world which contains three. In each world the goal is to collect three colored gemstones called Keystones in order to reopen a portal to finish the level. In addition to the Keystones, there are 2 additional optional collectible types: Blue Whisps and gold Gatekeeper Coins. There are 20 Blue Whisps in each level, which are scattered along the critical path of the level, and five Gatekeeper Coins, which are put in more difficult-to-reach places.

The game's controls are based on snake locomotion. The player can move Noodle's head 360 degrees on a flat plane, lift it up, move Noodle forward, tighten his grip, and call Doodle to lift Noodle's tail. Moving forward in a straight line is slow, so Noodle must slither from side to side in order to gain speed. The game considers Noodle's body to be made up of many small segments, each of which is affected by physics, and so Noodle's body reacts naturally to gravity. The player must wrap Noodle's body around objects in order to stay secure and not fall, as well as to climb structures. Different worlds introduce different mechanics; in addition to bamboo structures that Noodle can wrap around to secure himself, levels can also feature bodies of water where Noodle can freely swim and dive, wind currents that can blow Noodle around, and hazards like spikes and lava pits. If Noodle is killed by a hazard or bottomless pit, he respawns at the last checkpoint, and any collectibles he obtained after passing it are returned to their original locations.

After each level is beaten, players unlock a time trial mode for speedrunning the game. After beating the game, the player will unlock Snake Vision, a new power where the player can see all the remaining collectibles in a level while Noodle remains idle, and an arcade mode for each level in which Doodle collect fruit for points under a time limit.

== Plot ==
Doodle finds that a mysterious intruder is stealing the Keystones that allow travel in the gates between the lands. She wakes Noodle and together they set off to find the intruder, traveling to the top of Haven Tor along the way. In each of the worlds they see big black feathers and a large flying figure along the way. At the end of each world, the ruler of that realm thanks Noodle and Doodle and gives them a treasure. At the end of the final realm, they see that the magpie was looking for something shiny in order to reopen a portal to take them home. In approaching the bird, the 4 gifts given to Noodle and Doodle from the ruler of each realm work as keys and reveal "the Great Shiny." It then activates the portal, which allows the bird to go home. However, it soon returns, asking for the duo's help.

== Development ==
The game is named after a road in the Peak District National Park, close to developer Sumo Digital's headquarters in Sheffield, England.

The game is built on the Unreal Engine 4 game engine. The game came about when developer Seb Liese was attempting to learn to program for the Unreal Engine. He initially created a rope but forgot to attach it to anything, and the way it fell made him think of a snake. With the encouragement of his colleagues, he fleshed out the idea and presented it in a game jam.

Initially the graphics used a more realistic style, but this, according to Liese, "genuinely creeped out" people; as such, it was changed to a more cartoony design. It was also planned that the snake would grow as he ate, similar to Snake, but this was discarded because it created significant gameplay problems, one of which was that the game would have had to be virtually redesigned for a short snake.

Snake Pass supports platform-specific enhancements. On the PlayStation 4 Pro and the Xbox One X, the game runs at a 4K resolution and it includes high dynamic range support. On the Xbox One, it supports Xbox Play Anywhere, allowing users to play on both the Xbox One and Windows 10. The original score was composed by David Wise.

== Release ==
The game was released for Nintendo Switch, PlayStation 4, Windows, and Xbox One in North America on 28 March 2017, and in Europe and Australia the following day. In August 2018, Sumo Digital announced the Nintendo Switch would receive a limited physical release, courtesy of UK-based publisher Super Rare Games.

== Reception ==
Reception

Aggregate score
Aggregator	Score
Metacritic	NS: 72/100; PC: 71/100; PS4: 69/100; XONE: 74/100

Review scores
Publication	Score
GameSpot	7/10
IGN	7.2/10
Nintendo Life	8/10
Nintendo World Report	8/10

Snake Pass received mixed reviews according to review aggregator website Metacritic. Many reviewers praised the uniqueness of the movement, but cited a steep learning curve and gameplay or technical frustrations that brought the game's quality down. IGN's Jose Otero praised the movement and overall gameplay of the game, but criticized the camera and checkpoint system.

Both Nintendo World Report's Casey Gibson and Nintendo Life's Mitch Vogel praised the game's unique gameplay, but stated it had a steep learning curve in order to learn the unconventional controls. GameSpot's Oscar Dayus enjoyed the movement and visual design of the game, but criticized difficulty spikes in the middle of the game, as well as technical complaints.

The platforming without jumping in Snake Pass inspired the theme of Game Maker's Toolkit Game Jam 2018, which was "genre without mechanic".
