= Darkness and Light =

Darkness and Light may refer to:

- Darkness and light, or black-and-white dualism, a metaphorical expression of good and evil
- Darkness and Light (film), a 1999 Taiwanese film by Chang Tso-chi
- Darkness and Light (novel), a 1989 Dragonlance novel by Paul B. Thompson and Tonya R. Carter
- Darkness and the Light, a 1942 novel by Olaf Stapledon
- Darkness and Light (John Legend album), 2016
- Darkness and Light (Keldian album), 2017
- "The Darkness and the Light" (The Flash), a television episode
- "The Darkness and the Light" (Star Trek: Deep Space Nine), a television episode

== See also ==
- Darkness → Light, a 2002 album by Elevator, a band that included Rick White
- Darkness of the Light, a 2007 Hidden Earth novel by Peter David
- Dark and Light (disambiguation)
- Light and Darkness (disambiguation)
