= Aftercharge =

- Developer(s): Chainsawesome Games
- Publisher(s): Chainsawesome Games
- Engine: Unity
- Platform(s): Xbox One, Steam
- Release: WW: January 10, 2019
- Genre(s): First-person shooter

Aftercharge was a team-based cooperative multiplayer first-person shooter game developed and published by Chainsawesome Games. It was released on January 10, 2019, for Windows and Xbox One. The game is available for a limited time on Xbox Game Pass. The first public testing phase began on Steam, and lasted through October 13–15, 2017. The game was shut down on June 30, 2021. Chainsawesome Games was later shut down in 2023.

== Gameplay ==
Aftercharge assigns players into two teams of three, pitting invisible robots against an invincible security squad in tactical skirmishes, with each player placed on either the attacking side or the defending side. The attackers take the role of invisible robots and will make their way to destroy energy extractors located on the map, which are the main objective of the game. The defenders take the role of guards (dubbed enforcers) and will attempt to shut down the robots to protect the extractors, the main objective of the gameplay. Players choose from a character pool on each side with widely different abilities and roles to vary their team's strategy. Players on a team work together to destroy or defend control points on a map in a limited amount of time.

Aftercharge features squad-based combat with two opposing teams of three players each. The attackers have to coordinate their attacks, create distractions and sneak around to destroy them while the enforcers have to cover as much ground as possible and use their abilities to spot the attackers and stop them before they can destroy all of the extractors. Players choose one of the several characters, each with their own unique abilities and roles. Once an attacker's health has been depleted, it becomes "disabled", being able to see but not act. A disabled attacker can be revived by their teammates an infinite number of times. However, a defender victory occurs if all of the attackers are disabled at once. Players also gain cosmetic rewards that do not affect gameplay, such as character and weapon skins, as they play the game.

== Reception ==
The game received over a 70% rating on Steam. On June 1st, 2021, Chainsawesome games announced that the game would no longer be playable on June 30th, 2021, due to server costs outweighing the revenue generated.
