= Dark and Light (2006 video game) =

- Developer: NPCube
- Publisher: Farlan Entertainment
- Platform: Windows
- Release: 5 June 2006
- Genre: Massively multiplayer online role-playing
- Mode: Multiplayer

Dark and Light was a pay to play fantasy MMORPG developed in Reunion Island by NPCube and published by Farlan Entertainment. It was released on June 5, 2006, to largely negative reviews. Though there was never an official announcement regarding discontinuation of service, the servers have been offline since 2008, ostensibly due to a lawsuit by VWORLD.

Snail Games acquired the rights to Dark and Light in 2008 and developed a "fantasy survival sandbox RPG", which was released as early access in 2017 with the same name.

== Gameplay ==
Dark and Light was a third-person Massively Multiplayer Online Role-Playing Game (MMORPG), set in a medieval fantasy world called Ganareth. Players could choose from 12 races, 10 of which could be either male or female (the exceptions being Half-Trolls, which were male only, and Fairies, which could only be female). There were 14 playable character classes to choose from, divided into four main archetypes: Fighter, Hunter, Healer, and Mage. Fighters were designed to have good defensive abilities and armour, and also had the ability to bring the focus enemies off of other characters and onto the fighter. They could be Warriors, Paladins, or Shadow Knights. Hunters were a support character, relying more on tactics and offensive support than on damage or defense. They could be Archers, Rangers, Bards, or Thieves. The primary purpose of Healers was to heal, as the name suggests, but they also had decent ranged damage capabilities. Healers could be Clerics, Monks, Druids, or Enchanters. Mages discarded personal safety in favour of large amounts of damage, in addition to buffing other players. Mages could be Illustionists, Necromancers, or Wizards.

Progression in Dark and Light experience points gained in three separate systems, or "axes": Combat, Crafting, and Social. Combat experience was gained through defeating enemies, crafting from creating items, and social from joining guilds and doing guild quests.

Characters had 12 different equipment slots (head, shoulders, left and right arms, gloves, chest, shirt, belt, pants, left and right thighs, and boots) in addition to two weapon slots, allowing for one ranged weapon, one or two melee weapons, or a shield. Armour was divided into 6 types: robe, cloth, leather, reinforced leather, chain mail, and plate.

Crafting was divided into "jobs", each specified by the items that that job could produce. Tanners made leather armour, tailors made cloth armour, armourers made chain and plate armour, blacksmiths made weapons, and jewelers made jewels, jewellery, and bracelets.

The world was split into Kingdoms. Each kingdom represented one of the Gods of the realm, who in turn were subordinate to Gothar: God of Gods.

The expansive game world was one of their larger selling points, offering 39,000 square kilometers (15,000 sq. mi.) of land to explore.

== Development ==
Development on Dark and Light started by NPCube in 2002. Later, under the "pressure from its investors and from the gaming community", it was released underdeveloped to retail and on the internet in 2006 after a prolonged beta testing. On August 14, 2006, the publisher, Farlan Entertainment, stated that the game was released prematurely and has experienced problems due to its early release.

Farlan Entertainment signed with SnailGame Entertainment, the distributor in China, to provide additional help with the graphics. All of the current subscribers were given a free 3-month period to play the game.

== Reception ==
Dark and Light received largely negative reviews. Common complaints were the prevalence of gameplay bugs, low quality graphics, and poor overall implementation. Many reviewers liked the expansiveness and detail of the game world. GameZone gave the game 5.3 out of 10, saying that "innovative gameplay elements are not enough to save a game that is fraught with concept flaws, lag and bugs and unfinished elements." OnRPG stated that "this game had potential (yes... HAD). The whole idea of a 15,000 square-mile world would be marvelous to behold and the possibilities are quite profound" but was still disappointed by prevalence of gameplay and graphics bugs, as well as losing gold when the character died

== Lawsuit ==
On 27 April 2007 VWORLD, LLC brought a lawsuit against NPCube and Farlan Entertainment for "software counterfeit, non-respect of the right to credit and paternity, unfair competition and parasitism." In September 2007, NPCube responded by suing VWORLD, on the grounds "of unfair competition and damage to NPCube's reputation", additionally claiming that instead of VWorldTerrain technology, they were using a technology called SCAPER, developed in-house by NPCube, and demanding €710,000 in damages.

NPCube's lawsuit against VWORLD was dismissed on 13 March 2008. Additionally, NPCube was found to be using VWorldTerrain technology, not SCAPER, and was liable for €50,000 in damages to VWORLD.
