= Light and Darkness =

Light and Darkness may refer to:

- Light and darkness, or black-and-white dualism, a metaphorical expression of good and evil
- Light and Darkness (album), a 2006 album by Perseo Miranda, or the title song
- Light and Darkness (novel), a 1916 unfinished novel by Natsume Sōseki

== See also ==
- The Light and Darkness War, a 1988–1989 comics series by Tom Veitch and Cam Kennedy
- The Light and the Dark, a 1947 Strangers and Brothers novel by C. P. Snow
- Darkness and Light (disambiguation)
