= Robocraft =

2017 video game

- Developer: Freejam Games
- Publisher: Freejam Games
- Designer: Mark Simmons
- Programmers: Edward Fowler; Brian O’Connor; Sebastiano Mandala
- Artist: Richard Turner
- Engine: Unity
- Platforms: Microsoft Windows, OS X, Linux, Xbox One
- Release: August 24, 2017
- Genres: Vehicular combat, third-person shooter
- Mode: Multiplayer

Robocraft was an online vehicular combat game developed and published by Freejam Games. The game is set on different planets, with players constructing robots to fight with and against others in battle. The game features contained garage bays in which players can build various functional vehicles with basic block-based parts, such as cubes and wheels, along with weapons that can be used for combat. The initial alpha build was released in March 2013, and gained over 300,000 players by the following year. It officially released out of beta on August 23, 2017.

A sequel, Robocraft 2, was released in early access on November 7, 2023. Months later, on February 2, 2024, Robocraft 2 was delisted from digital platforms due to receiving mostly negative reviews from players and as part of the studio's plan to rebuild the game from the ground up. On January 20, 2025, Freejam Games announced that they would be shutting down the servers for Robocraft and Robocraft 2 due to the studio's closure.

== Gameplay ==
Robocraft is a "build, drive, fight" game where players build their robots from building parts. Players have the option to play multiple game modes that offer different experiences, for example, Player Vs AI, Brawl and custom games.

=== Currency and experience ===
Robocraft uses "Robits" and "Tech Points" as its currency. Robits are used to buy parts, community-made robots or new garage slots. Items are unlocked by spending Tech Points in the tech tree. Before June 19, 2018, players could also get items from crates. After that date, they were removed and instead players could only get Robits. The more experience a player can get in a match, the more Robits they earn. Currently, no player can achieve a level over 10,000.

=== Building a robot ===
The tech tree was added on June 19, 2018, which allows players to get the different parts that they want instead of them being randomly given parts via crates. Players are given the freedom to build and customize their robots in any way they like, as long as it does not exceed their in-game CPU limit (2000). The player's CPU limit does not increase as they level up. Different chassis and hardware blocks consume different amounts of CPU. After a bot passes 2000 CPU it becomes a Megabot, which can only join Custom Games and Play vs AI gamemodes.

=== Battle Systems ===
The game features a part-based damage system. To destroy a robot, 75% of the robot's total CPU must be destroyed. When a robot part is damaged, all adjacent parts connected to it are partially damaged as well. This damage system model permits complex engineering techniques in the areas of damage distribution and redirection. For example, players can use "tri-forcing" and "rod-forcing" to intentionally choose which parts are connected to one another, thereby moving incoming damage to less important parts and allowing the most vital components of a robot to stay alive longer. When a robot part is destroyed, such as a weapon or mech leg, that part is disabled until it can be regenerated. Players can strategically aim for certain weak points on a robot to disable their weapons or make the robot harder to control.

Robots have an automatic regeneration ability that repairs them after not being damaged for 10 seconds. If a robot is damaged while auto-repairing, the 10-second timer is reset and auto-repairing stops. Some gamemodes feature a respawn mechanic, where bots that have been destroyed will be returned to the field of battle. When a bot has just respawned, it will have a spherical shield surrounding it which negates any damage done to the bot until it wears off. This respawn shield was made to discourage spawn camping.

The game also has a weapon energy system, which defines how long someone can shoot with their weapons. Different weapons consume different amounts of energy per shot. If the player's robot does not have enough energy, they must wait for their energy to refill before being able to fire their weapon again.

Previous versions of Robocraft featured a "Boost" system, which multiplied a bot's stats depending on how it is built. Movement parts would increase the speed boost depending on how many of them were used. If the bot used most of the 2000 CPU given to the player, it would have its health increased but its weapon effectiveness would be less, and vice versa. This was removed in an update due to complaints from players of the game.

=== Gamemodes ===
Robocraft features seven game modes:

- Test
- AI Bots Deathmatch
- Team Deathmatch
- Elimination
- Battle Arena
- Brawl
- Custom Game

Players can earn experience and robits in all game modes except Test and Custom Game. All multiplayer game modes are ranked. Players earn ranking points from playing in multiplayer.

==== Test ====
The Test game mode is a simulation map with rugged terrain and flat platforms. The purpose of this game mode is for players to test their robots in the absence of other robots and objectives. No experience is earned while in this game mode.

==== Play VS AI ====
Play vs AI is the same as Team Deathmatch, except that all the other robots in the player's team and the robots in the other team are AI controlled.

==== Battle Arena / League Arena ====
In Battle Arena, each team's base has a "Protonium Reactor", which must be fed energy in order to power "the Annihilator". A team's Protonium Reactor is charged gradually by capturing and defending three control points placed on the map. The speed at which energy is collected for the protonium reactor depends on how many control points that team is currently controlling. A match is won when the Annihilator reaches 100% and the enemy's base is destroyed. If the timer runs out, whichever team has the most energy will win. If both teams have the same amount of energy when the timer expires, it is considered a Draw and neither team will win.

Players can capture control points for their team by standing on them for a period of time. Each point is divided into three segments, and if an enemy interrupts a player trying to capture a point, but many segments are already captured will stay partially captured and make the point more vulnerable to future capture attempts.

Each team's reactor is protected by a "Fusion Shield". Players are healed by the Fusion Shield at their own base, which is impenetrable by enemy fire from the outside. Enemies entering your fusion shield cannot fire their weapons and will gradually take damage the longer they stay inside. The fusion shield requires a constant supply of energy to functionーif a team captures all three control points, their enemy's fusion shield will be disabled. Players can invade the enemy's protonium reactor while its shield is down and steal energy from it for use at their own reactor instead. If a team controls all three control points for an extended period of time, they will become "Dominating" and the speed at which they collect energy will be accelerated.

Occasionally, a "protonium crystal", also known as The Equalizer, will appear at the center of the map for the losing team to attack. The losing team will have 60 seconds to destroy the crystal and harvest its energy before it disappears. The winning team can fight to try to stop the losing team from destroying the crystal. If the losing team destroys the crystal, the scores between the two teams will be evened out, allowing the losing team to catch up.

==== Team Deathmatch ====
In this mode, two teams of 5 players fight with 5 second respawn times and a frag limit of 15. The first team to reach 15 frags wins. If the timer runs out before the frag limit is reached, the team with more frags wins. If both teams have the same score when the time runs out, it goes into sudden death, where the team who destroys the next robot wins.

==== Elimination ====
In Elimination, two teams of 10 players fight until the last robot standing. When a robot is destroyed, it will not respawn. Players are encouraged to bring highly durable robots that are able to heal their teammates. Whichever team gets wiped out first loses. Alternatively, a player can capture a point at the enemy's base to win the game, but this takes a very long time. If both teams are still alive when the timer runs out, it is considered a Draw and neither team wins or loses.

==== Brawl ====
Brawl consists of several changes to rules and mechanics of other gamemodes, such as slower time, lowered damage, increased player counts and limitations as to what robots players can play with. These rules are changed every so often as to not be repetitive. Once a new Brawl has started, players get a double XP bonus for their first victory.

==== Custom Game ====
Custom Games are customizable matches in which several mechanics can be changed or removed at will by the leader, as well as selecting maps and team sizes. This is the only multi-player gamemode in which Megabots are allowed.

=== Weapons ===
There are several different weapons in the game:

- Laser (a machine-gun-like weapon, has two versions: front mounted and top mounted)
- Plasma (fires a plasma grenade with an arc that explodes on impact)
- Rail (a sniper-like weapon, fires a single high-damage shot with a very low rate of fire and high accuracy)
- Nano (a healing gun with a short range that is incapable of dealing damage but in turn can heal teammates)
- Tesla (a dangerous blade which heavily damages any bot it touches)
- Aeroflak (an anti air gun that fires projectiles that only explode near flying bots and on hit the projectiles will deal more damage up to 20 times)
- Proto-Seeker (fires many small, seeking projectiles that lock onto enemies at short range at a very high rate of fire)
- Lock on Missile Launcher (after spending 2–3 seconds locking on, it fires seeking missiles that explode on impact, if losing lock on a target, the already launched missiles will continue to seek their target)
- Ion (a shotgun-like cannon that deals massive damage in a short range)
- Chain (a gatling gun/minigun like weapon that spins up for a very high rate of fire)
- Mortar (a short-range Plasma like cannon that cannot aim straight horizontally or vertically, acts like an artillery)

Almost all weapons have multiple rarity variants, each having different stats, such as requiring more weapon energy, increased damage, increased ROF, etc.

There are also Modules (Disc Shield, Blink, Weapon Energy, Electromagnetic Pulse, Windowmaker, and Ghost Modules) which have certain abilities such as deploying a large temporary impenetrable Shield, traveling certain distances in less than a second, stunning all enemies in a radius, etc.

=== Social ===
Players can friend other players or add up to 4 other players to their platoon (regardless if they have premium or not) in order to play on the same team in the same match together. Players can also join Clans, a group of players with a maximum of 50, wherein players can cooperatively earn SXP (Season Experience) awarded at the end of a match which will then be converted into Robits at the end of the Clan Season. The Robits accumulated from the clan's TXP (Total Experience) will be distributed equally to clan members, albeit those who do not contribute in it in any way wouldn't receive any amount of Robits.

== Development ==
Robocraft uses the Unity engine and Yahoo Games Network.

=== 2014 ===
A November update added EasyAntiCheat (EAC) software to the game's client, in order to counter various hacks such as zero reload time. Freejam has stated that the EAC team will focus on anti-cheating, allowing them to focus on new features. A major game update was released on December 9, adding Tank Tracks and Tesla Blades, a unique melee weapon, alongside several new features.

=== 2015 ===
On February 18, the "Dawn of the Megabots" update was released. This features a wide array of updates including new matching systems. "Megaboss" and "Challenge Mode", and rotor blades were introduced to let players construct "New helicopter style Copter Class Robots." These were all introduced alongside many new updates.

On April 30, "Respawned and Overclocked" was another large update, which completely changed the core gameplay. The robot-building remained unchanged, but the battles were given new mechanics, such as Protonium Crystals that must be destroyed instead of the previous goal of capturing the enemy base. Also added were Fusion Shields, SCU's, Fusion Towers, and Overclocking, as well as other changes such as rebalancing armor and healing.

On June 24, the controversial update "Team Orders" was released. Most restrictions found in this update were later removed in Robocraft: Unleashed due to a heated response from the player community. A new ping system was added that allowed players to send messages to teammates on the map including: "On My Way", "Danger", and "Go Here". The current Surrender Vote, Leaver Penalty, and Battle Stats Screen were first implemented in this update. This update also reduced the number of towers in Battle Arena mode from 4 to 3, to "give one team a constant advantage".

On July 28, Robocraft: Unleashed was released. This update removed a variety of build and combat restrictions implemented in the Team Orders update.

On August 27, "Legends of the Pit" became live. This update introduced the long-anticipated game mode "The Pit" currently only available in custom games.

On September 24, the update "Share, Drive, Fight" became available to all players. This update included the Community Robot Factory, a place to buy, rent, and sell robots designed by users. A single player mode was also introduced featuring AI enemy combatants.

On December 17, the update "Full Spectrum Combat" was released. This was the first update to implement The Vision proposed by FreeJam on their forums. This update included an update to the Unity 5 game engine, the ability to paint cubes, and the collapse of all armor cubes to one type (replacing the original tier system), but a variety of new armor cube shapes were introduced. In addition, up to 25 garage slots are now free for all users. Hotly debated on the forums was the removal of the Pilot seat, a notable design feature since the early days of Robocraft. The Megaseat was also converted to the Mega Module, and it is extinct from purchase forever, although players who had an existing inventory get a chance to keep it.

=== 2016 ===
On March 3, "Maximum Loadout" was released after being delayed for a week due to bug testing. The update introduces the ability to use multiple weapon types to be used on a single robot. In addition to this, the maximum pFLOP was increased to 1750 at Level 150. Firing weapons drain the power of a bot, which then regenerates over time, though it is possible to get a Weapon Energy Module which reduces this process from 10 seconds to 8. In addition to this, two new modules have been added to the game. The DSM or Disc Shield Module deploys a stationary shield, which can be fired through only by the team of the player that deployed it and has a long cooldown. In addition to this, the BLM, or Blink Module, will allow robots to warp forward a relatively long distance, at the expense of massive power consumption with short cooldown.

On April 13, the update "Ghosts in the Machine" added the Ion Distorter, a futuristic shotgun, and the Ghost Module which allows invisibility at the expense of the power meter.

On April 28, an update named "Epic Loot" switched currency and got rid of the tech tree, allowing players to buy any parts without needing to level up. Galaxy cash was removed too. The currency RP was switched to "Robits". This update also removed cube depots and introduced crates as one of the only two sources of parts in-game, the only other way to recycle weapons or other items into "Robits" and forge new weapons or items in the "cube forge".

On June 1, "Battle for Earth" was released, adding a new map based in Birmingham, Earth. This map is based on a power station, which was "New and hi tec, yet old and abandoned", with a cooling tower in ruins in the centre. This map was exclusive to a new mode called "Team deathmatch", which replaced the old Team deathmatch, renamed to "Elimination".

On June 26, "Aeroflak Sentinel & Power" update was released, adding a smaller version of the aeroflak, namely the "Aeroflak Sentinel" and changes were made to power usage.

On July 14, "Enter the Shredzone" update was released, adding a new mini-gun named "Chain Shredder" and a new module called "EMP Module" which disabled the enemy robots in a certain radius after it is activated for a certain time, when hit can't move or shoot weapons and the screen becomes less colorful. The effect lasts for 3 seconds. Diagonal rods, a new game mode called "AI Bots Death match" and a Tutorial were also added in this update.

On August 4, "Strut Your Stuff" was released, adding Struts, better-protected aerorods, and a centre of mass feature.

=== 2017 ===
On May 4, "The Windowmaker" update was released, removing all radar accessories, moved all shields to the "special" category, and added a new module called the "Window maker module", allowing the players to detect all enemies within 7.5 seconds at the cost of some energy, currently the cheapest module ever. A shrunken version of the Chain Shredder, the "Chain splitter", was also added.

On August 23, the game went into full release with the drop of 1.0. This update removed Carbon 6 weapons, all cosmetics, and some building blocks from forge. Cosmetics can only be earned by receiving them in crates. People who were a part of beta got Pilot seats as a "thank you reward". Depending on what year a player joined leading up to 1.0, they got a set number of Pilot seats and Protonium crates.

On September 19, the "Gyro Mortar" update was released.

On November 19 the "Body Builder" update was released.

=== 2019 ===
On February 12 an update which add the calculation F=MA to the game to make building was introduced, where smaller and light builds turn quickly and accelerate quickly but harder to control. Bigger and heavy builds will turn and accelerate more slowly but are easier to control, which in turn can make a bot turn faster than its weapons or that the bot turns slower than the weapons do. This was introduced along with a Progression system where players can use their Robits to buy new bays or upgrade existing bays to hold bigger bots. When a new bay is used it will have 750 CPU form the start to allow room for a small bot but can be upgraded to hold a megabot (10,000 CPU).

On March 7 an update was launched which introduced upgradable weapons which when used in battle will earn Exp or "Power" on their own. If the weapon's "power" bar is full it can be upgraded to deal more damage to up to 5 upgrades. Also along with this update all the multiplayer game-modes are ranked and a leader board was introduced to encourage players to play well. Along with this the max loadout was reduced from 5 to 3 slots.

By June 18, the development began to cease. From now on only major bugs will be fixed and the game will keep running as long as there are players. Freejam's development focus was shifted towards Robocraft 2, the sequel of Robocraft which previously went under the names of "Gamecraft" and "Techblox".

=== 2023 ===
On November 7, Robocraft 2 was released in early access after going through multiple playtests throughout the year. Upon release, the game received mostly negative reviews from players, complaining about lack of content, slow combat, underwhelming weapons, no team communications or party system and performance optimization issues amongst other complaints which the studio said they would address in following updates to the game.

=== 2024 ===
On January 22, Freejam announced that they have decided to rebuild Robocraft 2 from the ground up to be closer to the original game's 2014-2015 era with modern graphics and technology and greater variety of gameplay. On February 2, Robocraft 2 was delisted from digital platforms as part of that decision. On June 6, Freejam announced a closed playtest for the rebuilt Robocraft 2 planned for the next day. The studio did not publish any more status updates for the game since then.

=== 2025 ===
On January 8 on Discord and officially on January 20 on Steam, Freejam Games announced the imminent closure of the studio, alongside the delisting of Robocraft from digital platforms and shutting down the servers for both Robocraft and its sequel, Robocraft 2, over the course of the week. The game was delisted and the servers were shut down in the following days.

== Monetization ==
Robocraft was a free-to-play game where players can get to the end game "without even paying a cent". FreeJam operates on a "Pay To Progress Faster" model where in "Premium" memberships can be purchased which doubles the rate XP is earned. The developers often partner up with certain charities or companies to release "Bundles", which often come with cosmetics and the promoted company's logo on a "holo-flag". These bundles often come at a significant discount from how much it would cost to normally purchase the items. The addition of painting cubes has been controversial, as the colours available for free players are limited while other colors, previously available for free as tiered armour cubes, are now exclusive to Premium players, but new colours were promised for future updates. All premium players receive 3 times the recycle rate of parts. Robocraft also uses a Season rewards to which the more someone plays, a player will gain rewards where players get 2 rows. Both rows have a bar to display their progress which fills up while battling. If the bar fills up fully they get the reward shown on the rewards rows where 1 row is free of charge but the 2nd row requires a Season pass to unlock.
