= AO Tennis 2 =

2020 sports video game

- Cover of the game featuring Ashleigh Barty (left) and Rafael Nadal (right)
- Developer: Big Ant Studios
- Publisher: Nacon
- Director: Mike Merren
- Producer: Daniel Dunphuy
- Designer: Beau Barker
- Programmer: Matt Ellison
- Artist: Jacob Thomas
- Series: AO Tennis
- Platforms: Microsoft Windows; Nintendo Switch; PlayStation 4; Xbox One; Amazon Luna
- Release: Windows, Switch, PS4, Xbox One: EU: 9 January 2020; NA: 11 February 2020; Amazon Luna: US: 20 October 2020
- Genre: Sports
- Modes: Single-player, multiplayer

AO Tennis 2 is a tennis video game developed by Big Ant Studios and published by Nacon. It is the sequel to AO Tennis and holds the official license of the tennis Grand Slam Australian Open. The game was initially released on 9 January 2020 for Microsoft Windows, Nintendo Switch, PlayStation 4 and Xbox One.

== Gameplay ==
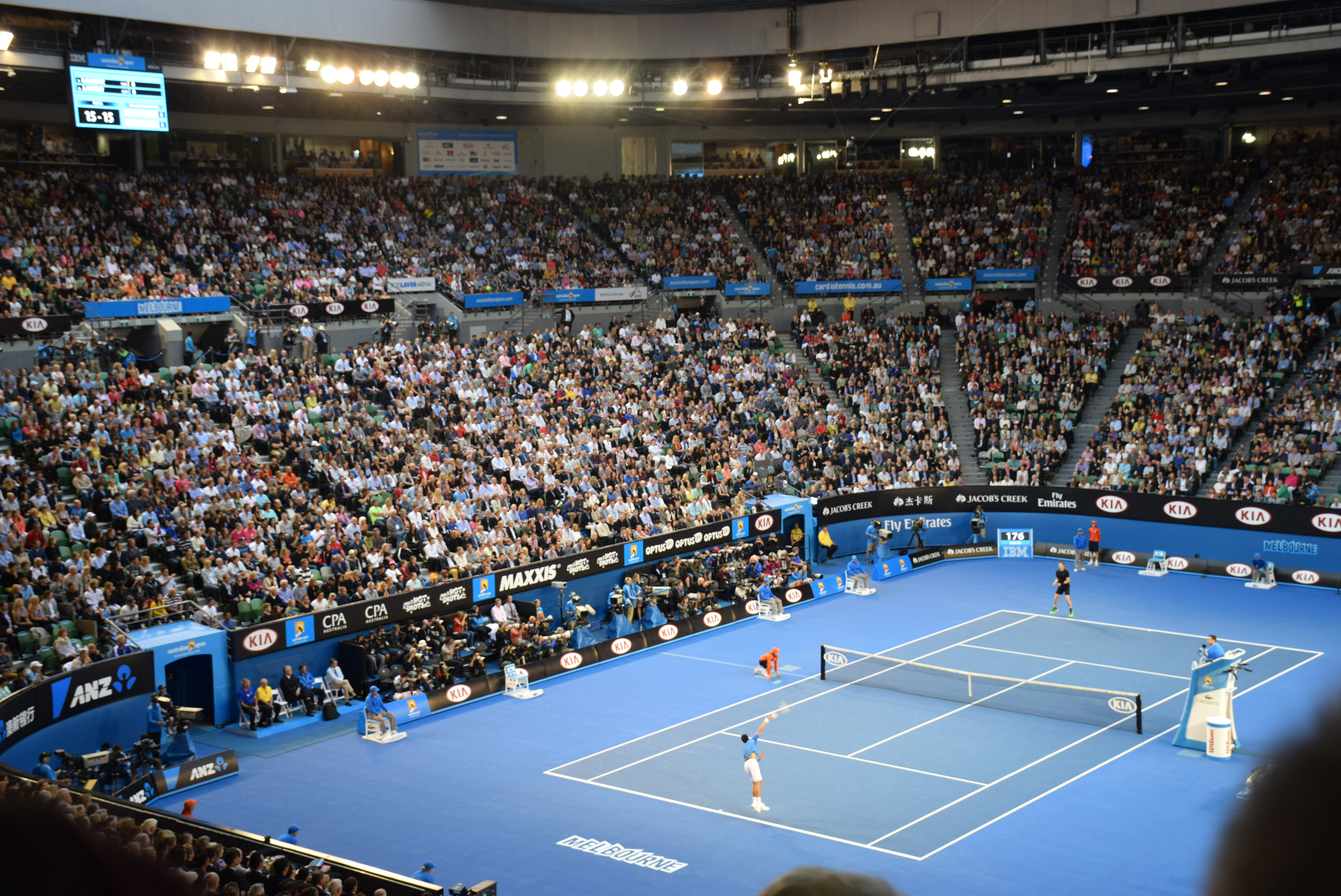
AO Tennis 2 allows players to play in the Rod Laver Arena.

AO Tennis 2 game features multiple types of tennis match. The re-designed career mode features a new managing system. Players have to earn money and experience that can be used to boost players' skills and stats. The higher level is, the better form would like to perform. While performance on court is important, how to deal with press conference, how to maintain good relationship with your team would also be critical for players' reputations and decide the quality of sponsors that players can pick up.

In addition to the solo game, the game introduces a multiplayer mode which offers up to four local players competing head-to-head. A cooperation mode is also available so that players can team up in doubles online. Like its predecessor AO Tennis, all custom players and venues sharing with the community are downloadable for the game.

== Development and release ==
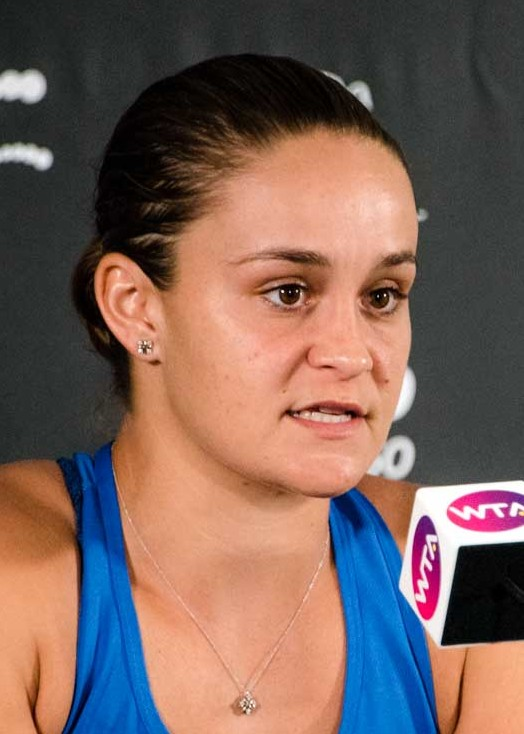
WTA World No. 1 Ashleigh Barty is one of the star players in the game.

AO Tennis 2 was revealed with a game trailer in November 2019. It is developed and published by the Australia-based video game developer Big Ant Studios, the developer of AO Tennis. It is the second video game that holds the official license of the Australian Open, which gives the game plenty star players from ATP and WTA, including Rafael Nadal, Stan Wawrinka, Angelique Kerber, Ashleigh Barty and more.

The game was released on 9 January 2020 in Europe and 11 February 2020 in North America for Microsoft Windows, Nintendo Switch, PlayStation 4 and Xbox One. In Japan, the game was made available on 14 May 2020. An official editing tool, which allows players to create their own players and stadiums and share online was available via Steam. The game was released for Amazon Luna on 20 October 2020.

== Reception ==
Reception

Aggregate scores
Aggregator	Score
Metacritic	NS: 64/100; PC: 65/100; PS4: 69/100; XONE: 69/100
OpenCritic	42% recommend

Review scores
Publication	Score
4Players	59/100
Game Informer	6.5/10
GameStar	77/100
IGN	7/10
Jeuxvideo.com	13/20
Nintendo Life	5/10
PC Games (DE)	6/10
PlayStation: The Official Magazine	7/10
Push Square	7/10

AO Tennis 2 received "mixed or average" reviews, according to review aggregator website Metacritic. Fellow review aggregator OpenCritic assessed that the game received fair approval, being recommended by 42% of critics.

The game received a 7 from IGN. The reviewer Tristan Ogilvie commented the game was "better-looking" and "smoother-playing", and approved the improvement of the series.

The highest score came from William Thompson of Hooked Gamers, who gave 8 points out of a possible 10 to the game. He praised the refined career mode, and commented "AO Tennis 2 is a heap of fun", but he felt AI players seemed to be invulnerable as they were often able to hit the ball from anywhere.

Dominic Leighton of The Sixth Axis also rated the game an 8 out of 10, summarizing the game "bright" and "likeable". He was pleased with the in-game player creator and community support, as well as the depth of the game. However, he was not happy with the weird crowd sounds and thought licensed players were far from enough either.

Brian Mazique compared the game with its predecessor AO Tennis, and said the game "has more positives than negatives", but he also mentioned the AO tennis series was not "as complete as other sports titles".

Matt Hewson of player2.net wrote a review when the game was released based on the Switch, PlayStation 4 and Xbox One versions. He rated the game "B", praising the developer Big Ant Studios learned from their last release AO Tennis. He also wrote that the game was "a deep and rewarding simulation", and felt the game was "an ace" for hardcore tennis fans.

Matt Cox wrote a review at Rock, Paper, Shotgun, commenting "it would be unfair to single out AO Tennis 2 for replicating the banality of tennis when every sports 'em up has the same conceptual flaw".

TY Sheedlo gave two stars out of five at Screen Rant, which was the lowest score the game received. He described the game was "a headache", found it too hardcore to enjoy, even with its soft-rock soundtrack. He also complained the game was "unlikely to inspire any interest in the sport on its own".
