= Muzu.tv =

Independent music video website

MUZU
- Website type: Video hosting service
- Founded: July 2008
- Headquarters: South William Street, Dublin, {{{location_country}}}
- Area served: Selected countries
- Owner: Our Digital Universe Limited
- Founders: Ciarán Bollard; Mark French
- Key people: Ciarán Bollard (CEO); Colm Harte (CTO); Keith Curley (SVP)
- Website: www.muzu.tv
- Registration: Optional
- Launched: 16 July 2008
- Current status: In liquidation

MUZU was an Irish video hosting website that hosted music videos. It offered a catalog of online music videos licensed from record labels and generated revenue through advertising.

In October 2015, the company announced its liquidation.

== Company history ==
Before the launch, Sony BMG agreed to allow more than 6,000 videos by artists, such as The Ting Tings and Kylie Minogue, to be featured on the site. An additional 2,000 hours of footage was obtained from other entities such as Cherry Red, Eagle Rock Entertainment, Hollywood Music, Ministry of Sound, Ninja Tune and Planet Rock Profiles. Converse, Heineken International, O2, Pioneer Corporation, Ray-Ban and Sony were among the earliest companies to advertise on the website. On 20 August 2008, MUZU signed a deal with ITN, which gave it access to archive footage of TV shows such as The Tube and Calendar Goes Pop.

On 16 January 2009, EMI signed a deal permitting the website to feature more than 5,000 videos. On the 19th of January 2009 the Beggars Group also signed with MUZU. Merlin Network signed an agreement with the company on the 21st of July 2009, after previously refusing both MySpace and YouTube. On the 25th of January 2010, deals with AOL Music, Bebo, and Telegraph Media Group were announced. In January 2010, MUZU agreed to provide them access to its video library in exchange for a share of advertising revenue. On the 27th of January Cooking Vinyl announced a global deal, with its founder commenting that MUZU TV was "purpose-built for the music industry, and we believe it holds great revenue potential." At the time, MUZU also provided a legal music service and had signed deals with Irish Independent, Bauer Media Audio Ireland, (known at the time as Communicorp Group), Spinner UK, Drowned in Sound, Habbo Hotel, Virtual Festivals, Mama Group, Meanfiddler, and Fly Magazine. In January 2010, Samsung Group announced that it would allow the development of a MUZU app for its televisions. In February 2010, MUZU would release a new jukebox music video feature which would face competition from a similar feature released by YouTube. In 2011, MUZU's music video collection was made available on Metacafe. Several Sony home entertainment devices would offer MUZU videos through its Sony Entertainment Network. The MUZU.TV app became available on Xbox 360s in December 2011.

By 2013, the catalogue included 130,000 music videos, concerts, interviews, and music documentaries. That year, the company claimed to have the "largest legal catalogue of music videos available on the web licensed by major record labels and the independent sector." It also partnered with Last.fm for "scrobbling." MUZU began making a profit in late 2013, with backing from Bill McCabe. In 2014, MUZU and The Guardian recorded bands such as Klaxons for a live series. After struggling to pay rights holders for some time, MUZU announced its permanent closure in October 2015.

== Awards ==
The Irish Internet Association (IIA) named Bollard and French as the 2009 Net Visionaries. IIA Chair Maeve Kneafsey presented the award at a ceremony on 21 May 2009, describing the website as "an inspiration to the current and future generations of internet entrepreneurs who know that the internet means that there are no boundaries on what we can do in Ireland, the only limit being our imagination". Bollard and French spoke at the Dublin Web Summit on internet business in Trinity College Dublin on 4 February 2010.
