= AO Tennis (video game) =

2018 video game

- Developer: Big Ant Studios
- Publisher: Big Ant Studios
- Platforms: PlayStation 4; Xbox One; iOS; Android; Microsoft Windows
- Release: iOS, Android: WW: January 5, 2018; PlayStation 4, Xbox One: PAL: January 16, 2018; WW: May 8, 2018; Microsoft Windows: WW: May 8, 2018
- Genre: Sports
- Mode: Co-op mode; multiplayer; single-player

AO Tennis is a tennis video game developed and published by Big Ant Studios for the PlayStation 4, Xbox One, Android and iOS on January 5, 2018. It is the first official licensed game of the Australian Open.

It features a career mode where the player works to become world No. #1, starting by being world No. #1500.

== Gameplay ==
The game includes licences for players including Rafael Nadal and Angelique Kerber. AO Tennis allows players to create their own athletes, sponsorship logos, clothing and stadiums to play in.

== Development ==
The game's release featured a "day one patch" that added many features.

The game's release for iOS, and Android came before the console release, which was released in time for the start for the real-world Australian Open.

In April 2018, Big Ant Studios announced AO International Tennis for a global release on May 8, 2018. AO International Tennis would be a significantly reworked and enhanced title, with significantly improved gameplay and "more than twice" the number of gameplay modes that AO Tennis had at launch. In an interview with WCCFTech, Big Ant Studios CEO, Ross Symons, said:

"It's not so much "tweaks and changes" as AO International Tennis is genuinely a new game. It's got double the gameplay modes, far greater levels of customization, and a vastly improved gameplay engine to what AO Tennis launched with. When people watch videos of AO Tennis and AO International Tennis, they'll see two very different experiences."

== Reception ==
Reception

Aggregate score
Aggregator	Score
Metacritic	Xbox One:65% PS4:49%

Review scores
Publication	Score
GameSpot	3/10
Stevivor	7/10

With most reviews written prior to the release of the "day one patch" there was a great variance in the scores given, as is shown with media aggregator website Metacritic scoring the PlayStation 4 version at 49% based on 4 reviews, while user reviews were at 88% for PlayStation 4 and 95% for Xbox. Reception for the game ranged from 3/10 to as high as 8/10 largely based on whether reviewers had downloaded the "day one patch" or not. Stevivor, having downloaded the appropriate "day one patch", was positive on the game, writing "This is definitely a game I'd recommend to tennis fans" in its 7/10 review. Fox Sports reviewed the game without downloading the "day one patch", scoring it 4/10 calling the movement "clunky", and commenting that the game's AI often "decided not to swing at the ball", "rather than us mis-hitting it". Kotaku were highly negative about the game's release, commenting on the lack of gameplay footage released before launch. but also admitted to not downloading the "day one patch", later apologising for this oversight. Kotaku called the release build of the game "rough", particularly commenting on the game's doubles action, where players were "lifeless, stiff, and unresponsive to the action around them". GameSpot scored AO Tennis 3/10, noting "bland visuals", "inconsistent" physics. GameSpot were critical of the game's graphics, referring that "each real-life pro looks wooden."

Press Start Australia, after playing AO Tennis a few weeks after launch, wrote "After 10+ updates and the last one being quite major, it's honestly quite insane to see just how far this game has come over the last few weeks."

AO International Tennis received a far more positive response from critics. The Spanish-speaking SomosXbox wrote "AO International Tennis is an interesting video game for tennis fans, the game has a nice gameplay," and scored the game 6.5/10. Forbes, in scoring the game 6.7/10, praised the customisation options, writing "All non-license sports games should emulate AO International Tennis' approach to create-a-player and create-a-stadium suites."

== Sequel ==
AO Tennis 2 was released on January 9, 2020, in Europe and February 11, 2020, in North America for PlayStation 4, Xbox One, Microsoft Windows and Nintendo Switch. It was released in Japan on May 14, 2020.
