= List of Xbox One and Series X/S applications =

This is a list of applications available on the Xbox One and Xbox Series X/S. Some applications may require subscriptions, such as a qualifying TV provider and to the respective content.

== Exclusivity ==
- Yes = Exclusive only to the Xbox One console.
- Xbox = Exclusive to Microsoft's Xbox platforms.
- Timed = Confirmed as exclusive for a certain period of time, but will become available on other platforms later.
- No = Available to more than one console of this or the previous console generation

== Extra subscription ==
- Yes = A separate subscription (from Xbox Live) to a particular service is required for use. This can be to specific television service providers as well as content providers.
- Optional = A separate subscription (from Xbox Live) to a particular service adds functionality.
- No = All features available to all application users.

== List ==
Application	Type of software	Developer(s)	Gold subscription	Extra subscription	Asia	Europe	North America
AirServer	Screen mirroring receiver	App Dynamic ehf.	No	No	Yes	Yes	Yes
Amazon Music	Music streaming	Amazon.com, Inc.	No	Optional	Yes	Yes	Yes
Amazon Prime Video	Video on demand	Amazon.com, Inc.	No	Optional	Yes	Yes	Yes
Apple Music	Music streaming	Apple Inc.	No	Yes	Yes	Yes	Yes
Apple TV	Video on demand	Apple Inc.	No	No	Yes	Yes	Yes
BBC iPlayer	Video on demand	BBC	No	No	No	Yes (only available in the UK)	No
Crackle	Video on demand	Sony	No	Optional	No	No	Yes
Crunchyroll	Video streaming	Crunchyroll, LLC	No	Yes	Yes	Yes	Yes
CTV GO	Video on demand	Bell Media	No	Yes	No	No	Yes (only available in Canada)
CW TV	Video on demand	The CW Network, LLC	No	No	No	Yes	Yes (not available in Canada)
Disney+	Video on demand	Disney	No	Yes	Yes	Yes	Yes
Dolby Access	Audio utility	Dolby Laboratories	No	Optional	Yes	Yes	Yes
EA Play	Subscription gaming service	Electronic Arts	No	Yes	Yes	Yes	Yes
ESPN	Video on demand, live broadcasting	ESPN	No	Yes	No	No	Yes (not available in Canada)
Fandango at Home	Video on demand	Fandango Media, LLC	No	No	No	No	Yes
Fubo	Live TV, sports streaming	Fubo	No	Yes	No	Yes (only available in Spain)	Yes (only available in the US and Canada)
FXNOW	Video on demand	FX Networks	No	Optional	No	No	Yes (only available in the US)
HBO Max	Video streaming	Warner Bros. Discovery	No	Yes	Yes	Yes	Yes
Hulu Plus	Video on demand	Hulu	No	Yes	Yes (only available in Japan)	No	Yes (not available in Canada)
IGN for Xbox	Gaming news, reviews	IGN Entertainment	No	No	Yes	Yes	Yes
Karaoke One	Karaoke	Lisari s.r.l.	No	Yes	Yes	Yes	Yes
カラオケ@DAM	Karaoke	DAIICHIKOSHO CO., LTD.	No	Yes	Yes (only available in Japan)	No	No
Microsoft Edge	Web browser	Microsoft Corporation	No	No	Yes	Yes	Yes
MLB.tv	Video on demand	Major League Baseball Advanced Media	No	Yes	Yes	Yes	Yes
Movies and TV	Video on demand	Microsoft	No	Yes	Yes	Yes	Yes
Netflix	Video on demand	Netflix	No	Yes	Yes	Yes	Yes
NFL	Fantasy management, Live score updates	NFL; Microsoft	No	Yes	Yes	Yes	Yes
Niconico	Video sharing service	Dwango	No	No	Yes	No	No
Nitrado	Game server hosting	marbis GmbH (Nitrado)	No	No	Yes	Yes	Yes
OneDrive	Cloud storage	Microsoft	No	Optional	Yes	Yes	Yes
Pandora	Internet radio	Pandora Media, LLC	No	Optional	No	No	Yes (only available in the US)
Paramount+	Video streaming	CBS Interactive Inc.	No	Yes	No	Yes	Yes
PeacockTV	Video streaming	Peacock TV LLC	No	Yes	No	No	Yes
Plex	Media streamer	Plex	No	Optional	Yes	Yes	Yes
PlutoTV	Video on demand	Pluto Inc	No	No	No	Yes	Yes
Simple Background Music Player	Music player	TroubleAcres Apps	No	No	Yes	Yes	Yes
SoundCloud	Music streaming	SoundCloud Global Limited $ Co KG	No	Optional	Yes	Yes	Yes
Spectrum TV	Live TV, Video on demand	Charter Communications	No	Yes	No	No	Yes (only in the US)
Spotify	Music and podcast Streaming	Spotify AB	No	Optional	Yes	Yes	Yes
Starz Play	Video streaming	Starz Entertainment, LLC	No	Yes	No	No	Yes (only available in the US and Puerto Rico)
TED	Video on demand	Sapling Foundation	No	No	Yes	Yes	Yes
Telemundo	Video on demand	NBCUniversal	No	No	No	No	Yes
TrueAchievements	Gaming companion	TrueAchievements	No	Optional	Yes	Yes	Yes
TuneIn	Internet radio	TuneIn, Inc	No	No	Yes	Yes	Yes
TV 2 Sumo	Video on demand	TV 2 (Norway)	No	Yes	No	Yes (only available in Norway)	No
Twitch	Video streaming, broadcasting	Twitch	No	Optional	Yes	Yes	Yes
UFC TV	Video on demand	Zuffa, LLC	No	Yes	Yes	Yes	Yes
Ubisoft Connect	Content delivery, game add-on	Ubisoft	No	Optional	Yes	Yes	Yes
Viaplay	Video on demand	Viaplay AB	No	Yes	No	Yes	No
VLC	Video player, LAN video streaming	VideoLAN	No	No	Yes	Yes	Yes
YouTube	Video sharing service	Google YouTube	No	Yes	Yes	Yes	Yes

== Discontinued XBOX Apps ==
- Box Plus
- Bravo Now
- Comedy Central
- CTV GO
- FXNOW / FOX NOW
- GoPro Channel
- Groove Music
- Halo Waypoint
- Internet Explorer
- Machinima
- The Mall
- MailOnX
- Mixer
- MTV
- Popcornflix
- Redbox Instant
- Reddx
- Skype
- Syfy Now
- Upload Studio
- USA NOW
- Vine
- XBOX Avatars

== See also ==
- List of Xbox 360 applications
- List of Xbox One games
- List of Xbox Series X and Series S games
- Xbox Live
