= Riptide GP: Renegade =

2016 video game

- Developer: Vector Unit
- Publisher: Vector Unit
- Platforms: PlayStation 4 Windows; Apple TV; Android TV; Android; Nintendo Switch; Xbox One
- Release: July 26, 2016
- Genre: Racing
- Modes: Single-player, multiplayer

Riptide GP: Renegade is a jet ski racing video game developed and published by Vector Unit, an American video game development company. It was first released on July 26, 2016, for PlayStation 4 and Windows.

== Development ==
Riptide GP: Renegade was first announced by San Rafael, California-based studio Vector Unit on August 13, 2015. It first released for Windows on the video game distribution platform Steam.

== Gameplay ==
The main gameplay element is the career mode in the game. The player can unlock new vehicles by participating in various events, and the progression is primarily linear. Tricks can be performed in the air and grant the player boost if successful. The game offers different events such as races, elimination events, time trials, and others.

Additionally, the game offers a multiplayer race mode with up to eight players, as well as a split screen option for local multiplayer. Game saves can be stored to the cloud on iOS devices, allowing for easier transfer of data between them.

== Reception ==
Reception

Aggregate score
Aggregator	Score
Metacritic	88/100 (iOS); 75/100 (Nintendo); 71/100 (PlayStation); 75/100 (Xbox)

Review scores
Publication	Score
Nintendo Life	7/10
Pocket Gamer	8/10
TouchArcade	4.5/5 stars
148Apps	4.5/5 stars
Cubed3	8/10
Hardcore Gamer	4/5 stars
IGN Spain	7/10
Multiplayer.it	8.5/10
PlayStation Universe	7.5/10
Vandal	7.5/10

According to the review aggregating website Metacritic, Riptide GP: Renegade received generally favorable reviews for the iOS release, and mixed or average reviews for the Nintendo and PlayStation releases.

=== iOS ===
Carter Dotson of Touch Arcade praised the challenging career mode of the game, and overall described it as an "incremental improvement" over the previous release, Riptide GP2. Campbell Bird of 148Apps wrote that the game was well polished and optimized.

Writing for Multiplayer.it, Tommaso Pugliese described the game as the best in the series. Similarly, Mark Brown of Pocket Gamer described it as the best in the series, though Brown described the in-game cutscenes as unnecessary.

=== Nintendo Switch ===
Rudy Lavaux of Cubed3 compared the game to Wave Race. One criticism Lavaux made was the lack of online multiplayer for the platform, with split screen being the only option at the time of the review. Ryan Craddock wrote a review for Nintendo Life in which he praised the online multiplayer, which was added after release. Craddock noticed few performance issues, with only minor frame rate issues.

IGN Spain's review of the article was written by Jose A. Rodríguez. He described it as the "perfect example of how to make a fun game."

=== PlayStation ===
Jeremy Peeples of Hardcore Gamer praised the variety of tracks in his review, describing them as "action-packed." He criticized the game's soundtrack as unmemorable. For PlayStation Universe, Neil Bolt described the menus as functional, and not particularly special. Bolt described the game overall as a good-value game while never being spectacular. Vandal's Ramón Varela described the game as imperfect but a good choice for a racing game. According to Varela, the soundtrack was the lowest-rated part of the game.

=== Xbox ===
Paul Acevedo of Windows Central praised the arcade-style racing and online multiplayer in the game. He criticized the sound design of the game but overall described the game as a "must-buy for arcade racing fans."
