= Dark and Light (2017 video game) =

2017 fantasy survival sandbox RPG

- Developer: Snail Games
- Publisher: Snail Games
- Engine: Unreal Engine 4
- Platform: Windows
- Release: 20 July 2017 (early access)
- Mode: Online

Dark and Light is a "fantasy survival sandbox RPG" developed for Microsoft Windows PCs by Snail Games and released as early access on 20 July 2017.

Snail Games acquired the rights to the original Dark and Light in 2008.
