= Samsara (video game) =

2018 video game

- Developer: Marker Limited
- Publisher: Marker Limited
- Producer: Alex Humphries.
- Platforms: Microsoft Windows, macOS, Xbox One, iOS, Android
- Release: 6 February 2018
- Genres: Platform Game, Puzzle Game
- Mode: Single-player

Samsara is a single-player, puzzle platform video game in which players guide the protagonist Zee and a "shadowed echo" to safety by dropping objects with different forms and behaviours into two mirrored gameplay areas separated by the surface of a pool. Samsara was released on 6 February 2018 for Microsoft Windows, macOS and Xbox One. The developer, Auckland based Marker Limited, states that versions for iOS and Android will follow shortly afterwards. Samsara is an original title from Marker, a New Zealand development studio best known for its contract work.

== Gameplay ==
Samsara was on display for the public to play at PAX Australia 2017. It was reported that the puzzles were physics-based, and involved moving the player character from one point to another, in a game world divided into two halves horizontally. The upper world was described as "real" with the lower mirrored half described as a "Stranger Things inspired Upside-Down". The gameplay video shows the player selecting and rotating blocks from the right-hand side of the play area and dropping them into the gameworld. Blocks respond to gravity, and gravity is reversed in the lower, upside-down segment of the play area.

The game comprises 77 levels across 6 realms. According to the developer Marker, blocks with different properties are introduced later in the game and more complex interaction with the environment, including thorns that wither or grow depending on the game character that passes them. Senior Producer Alex Humphries states that "the player uses very simple mechanics to solve increasingly intricate problems", stressing that "progression has been carefully tuned".

== Development ==
Marker Limited is a New Zealand-based development studio reported to have released in excess of 75 games, including contract work for Disney (Crash, Boom, Ham!) and an original word game AlphaJax. Samsara is described as being in the final stages of development.
