= Dog communication =

Communication of dogs with other dogs and as well as humans

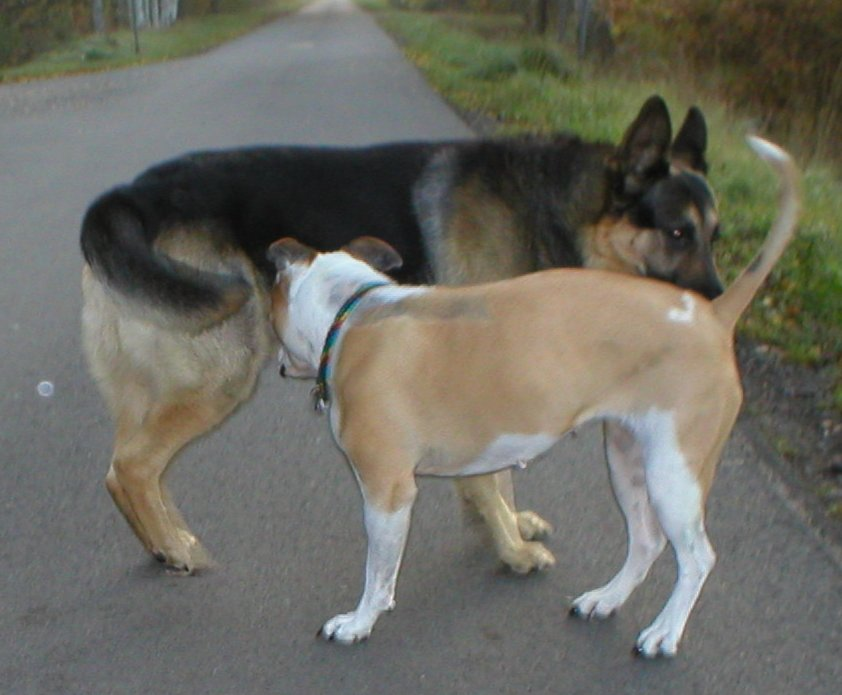
Dogs that are familiar with each other may lick each other's faces in greeting, then they begin to sniff any moist membranes where odours are strongest.

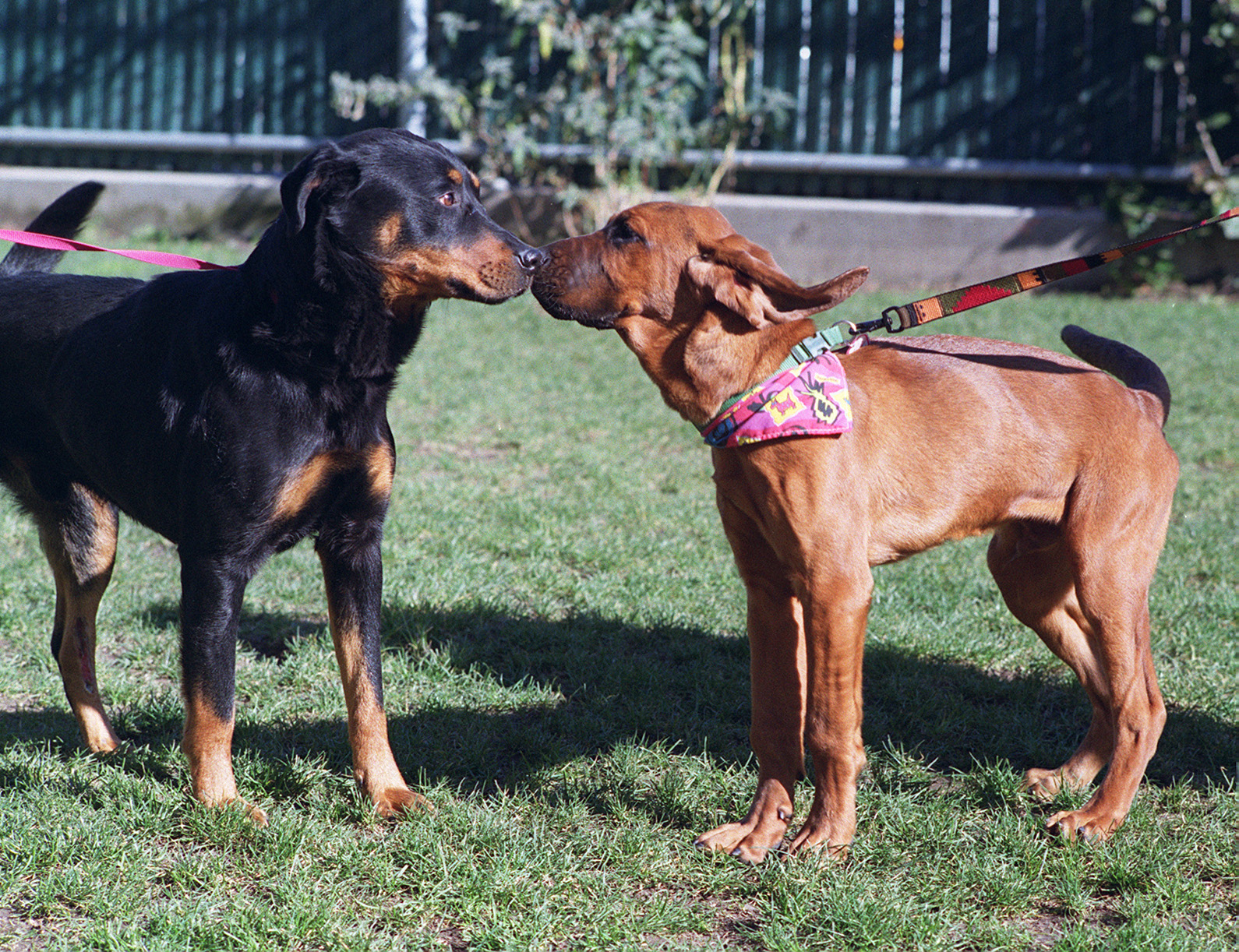
The mucus on a dog's wet nose traps particles from everything the dog has recently smelled or eaten. When dogs meet, they smell each other's noses to see what the other dog did that day and if there is any food nearby.

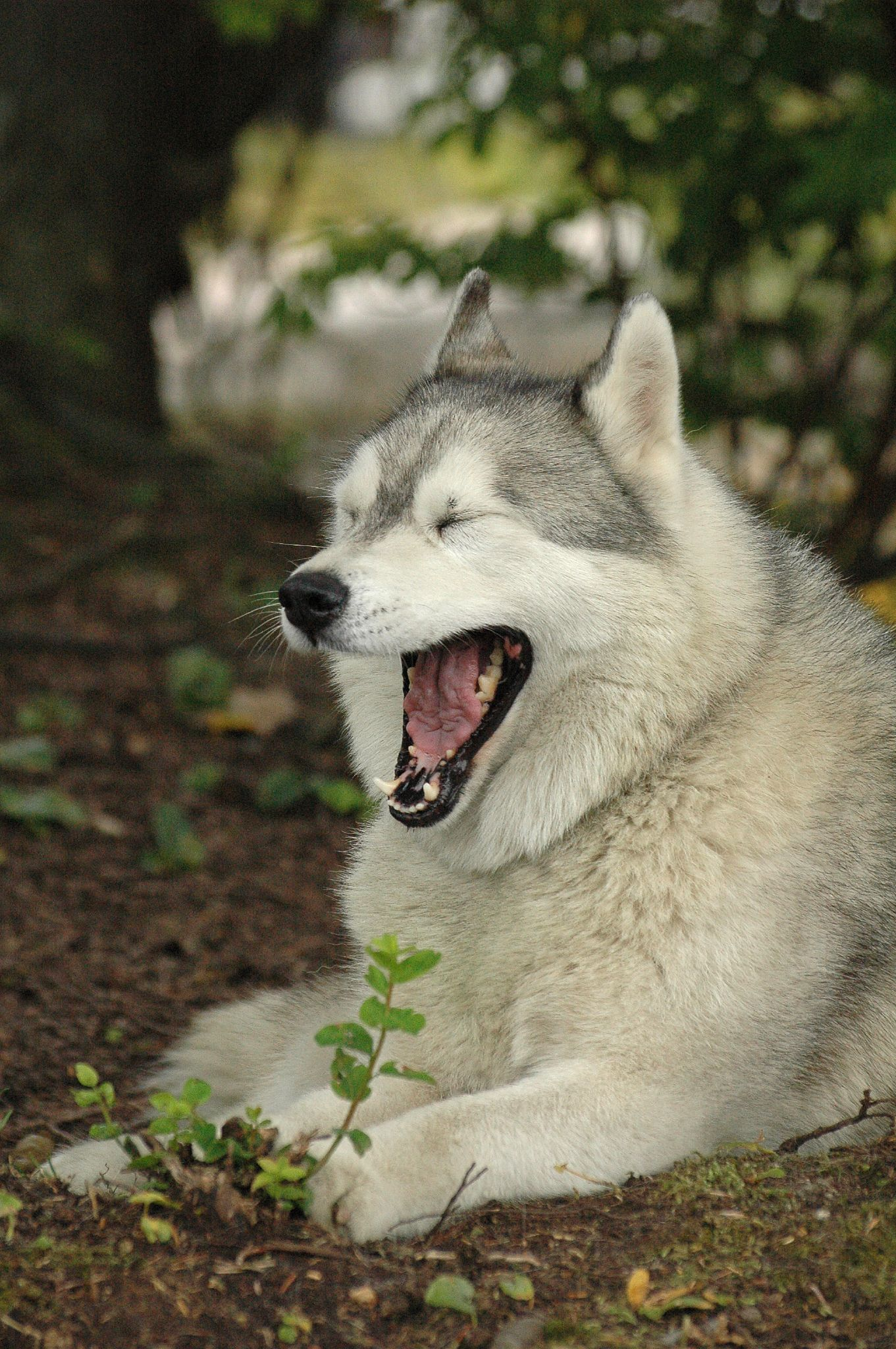
Dogs yawn when they are tired (like humans) or under stress.

Dog communication refers to the methods dogs use to transfer information to other dogs, animals, and humans. Dogs may exchange information vocally, visually, or through smell. Visual communication includes mouth shape and head position, licking and sniffing, ear and tail positioning, eye contact, facial expression, and body posture. Auditory communication can include barks, growls, howls, whines and whimpers, screams, pants and sighs. Dogs also communicate via gustatory communication, utilizing scent and pheromones.

Humans can communicate with dogs through a wide variety of methods. Broadly, this includes vocalization, hand signals, body posture and touch. The two species also communicate visually. Through domestication, dogs have become particularly adept at "reading" human facial expressions. Dogs recognise and infer emotional information from humans. When communicating with a human, their level of comprehension is generally comparable to a toddler.

== Dog–human communication ==
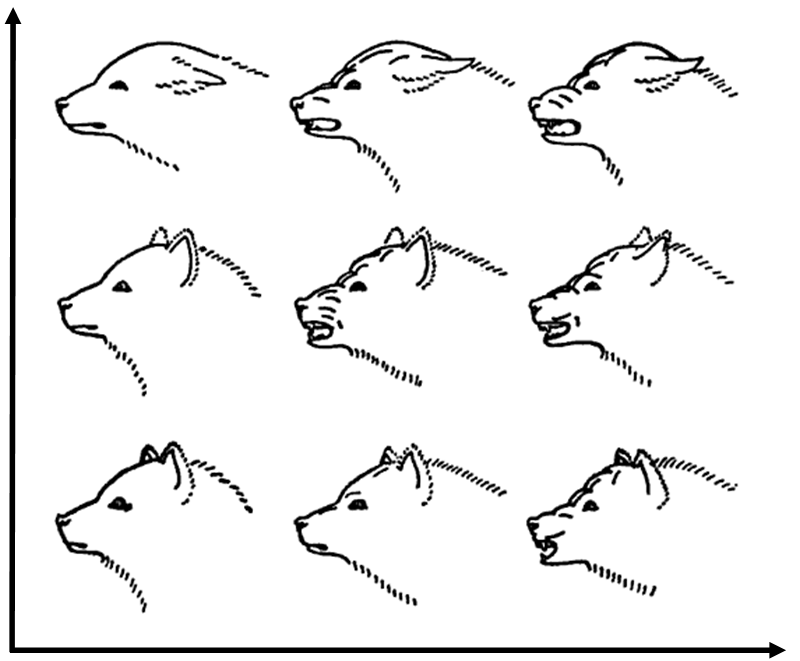
A drawing by Konrad Lorenz showing facial expressions of a dog – a communication behavior. y-axis = fear, x-axis = aggression

Dogs tend to be highly responsive to human cues, especially the direction of a gaze and the direction in which a human points. Dogs rely on the gestures of humans more than verbal cues, most importantly eye contact. Eye contact is considered an ostensive cue. A human-dog gaze helps dogs establish stronger relationships by being able to communicate better with humans, as well as other dogs. Dogs will start to act and react much like their owners do. Dogs will pick up on how their owners respond to strangers and non-friendly dogs.

Both humans and dogs are characterized by complex social lives with complex communication systems, but it is also possible that dogs, perhaps because of their reliance on humans for food, have evolved specialized skills for recognizing and interpreting human social-communicative signals. Four basic hypotheses have been put forward to account for the findings.

1. Dogs, by way of their interactions with humans, learn to be responsive to human social cues through basic conditioning processes.
2. By undergoing domestication, dogs not only reduced their fear of humans but also applied all-purpose problem-solving skills to their interactions with people. This largely innate gift for reading human social gestures was inadvertently selected via domestication.
3. Dogs' co-evolution with humans equipped them with the cognitive machinery to not only respond to human social cues but to understand human mental states; a so-called theory of mind.
4. Dogs are adaptively predisposed to learn about human communicative gestures. They come with a built-in "head start" to learn the significance of people's gestures, in much the same way that white-crowned sparrows acquire their species-typical song and ducklings imprint on their own kind.

The pointing gesture is a human-specific signal and is referential. Human infants acquire it weeks before the first spoken word. In 2009, a study compared the responses to a range of pointing gestures by dogs and human infants. The study showed little difference in the performance of 2-year-old children and dogs, while 3-year-old children's performances were higher. The results also showed that all subjects were able to generalize from their previous experience to respond to relatively novel pointing gestures. This can be explained as a joint outcome of their evolutionary history as well as their socialization in a human environment.

Most people can tell from a bark whether a dog/canine was alone or being approached by a stranger, playing or being aggressive, and able to tell from a growl how big the dog is. This is thought to be evidence of human-dog coevolution.

== Visual ==
Dogs communicating emotions through body positioning were illustrated in Charles Darwin's The Expression of the Emotions in Man and Animals published in 1872.

Examples of body positioning to communicate different emotions in dogs.

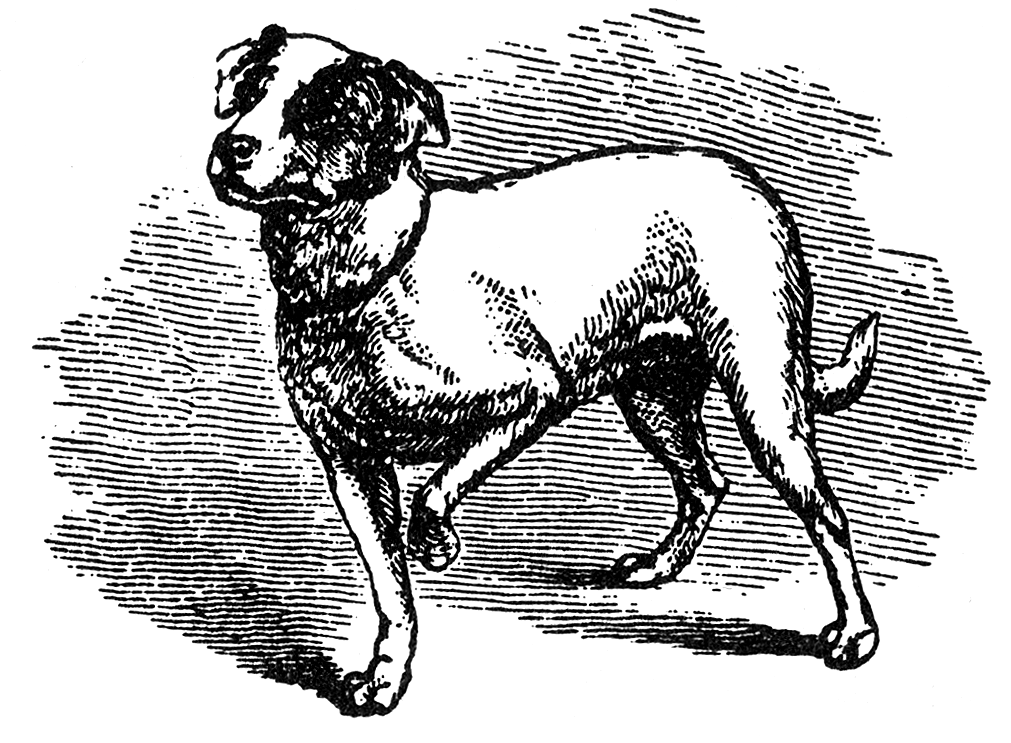
"Small dog watching a cat on a table"

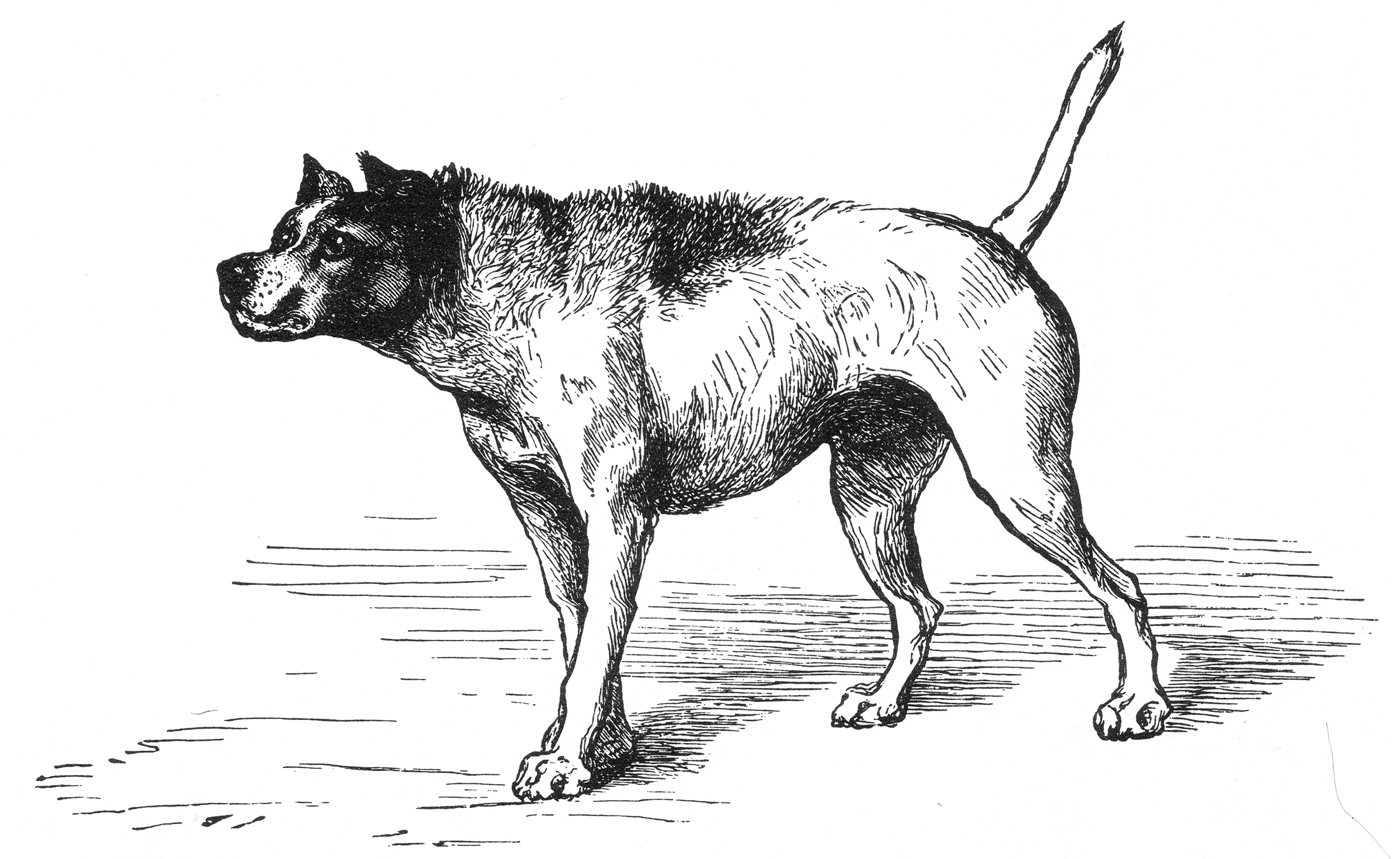
"Dog approaching another dog with hostile intentions"

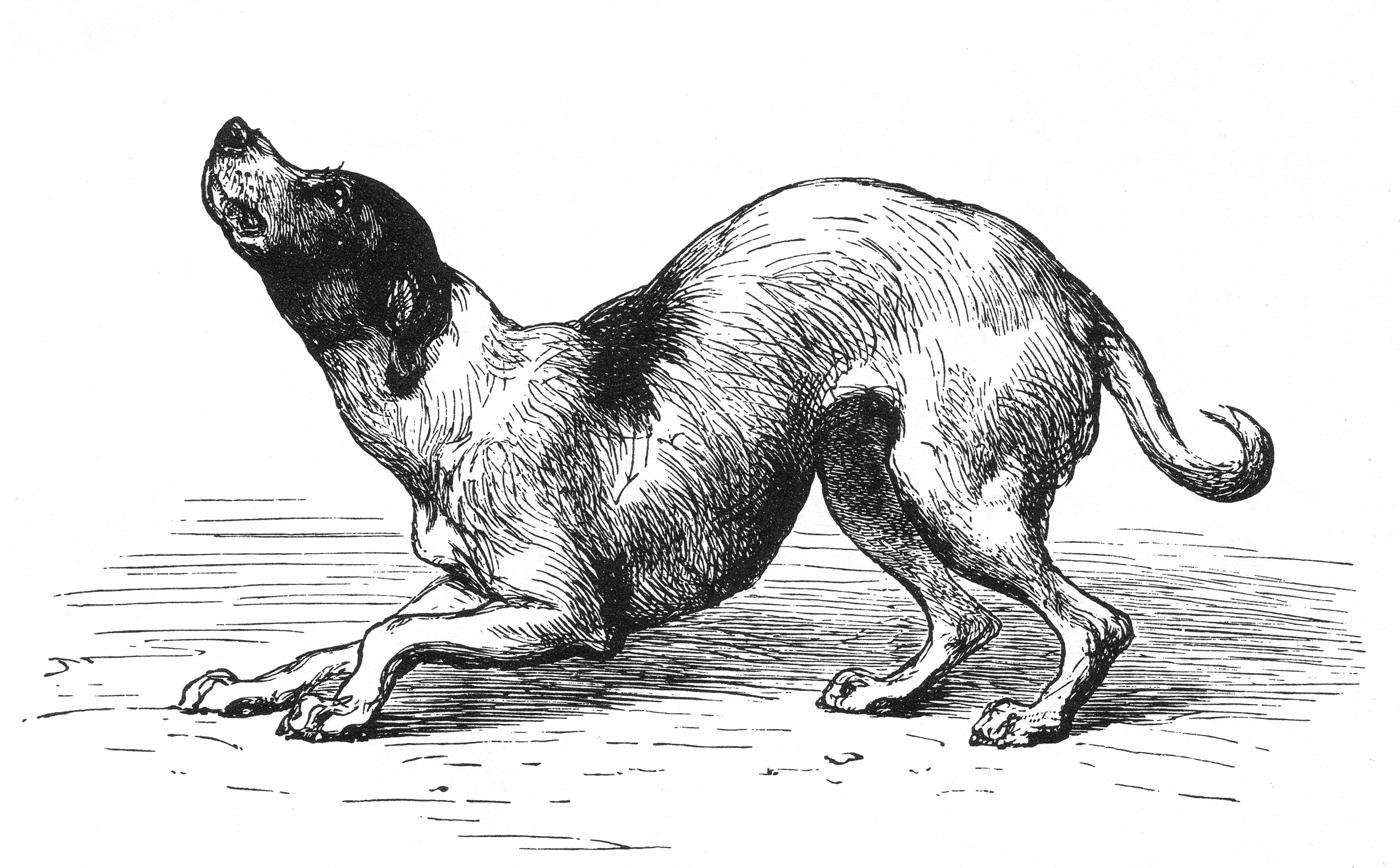
"Dog in a humble and affectionate frame of mind"

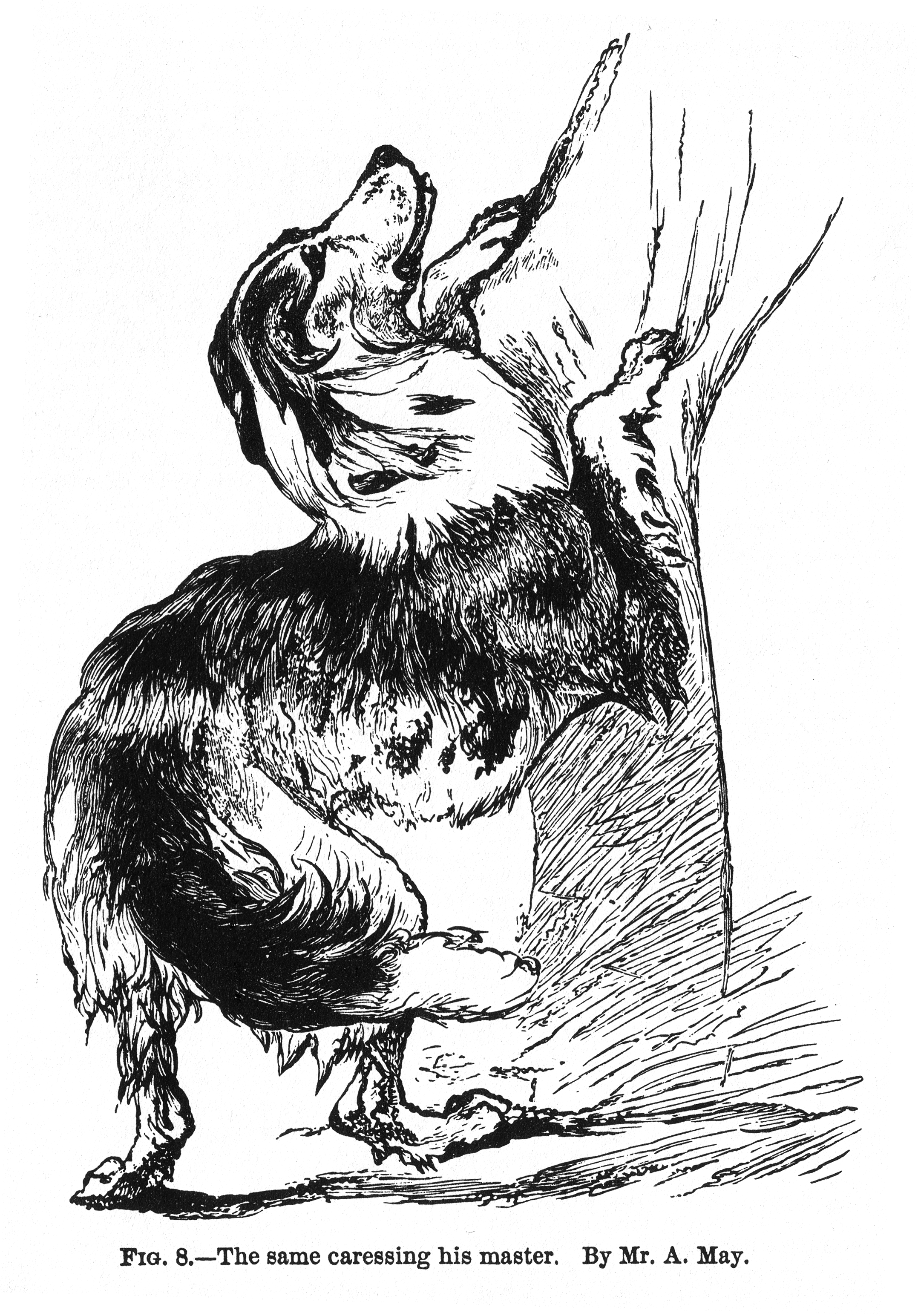
"Dog caressing his master"

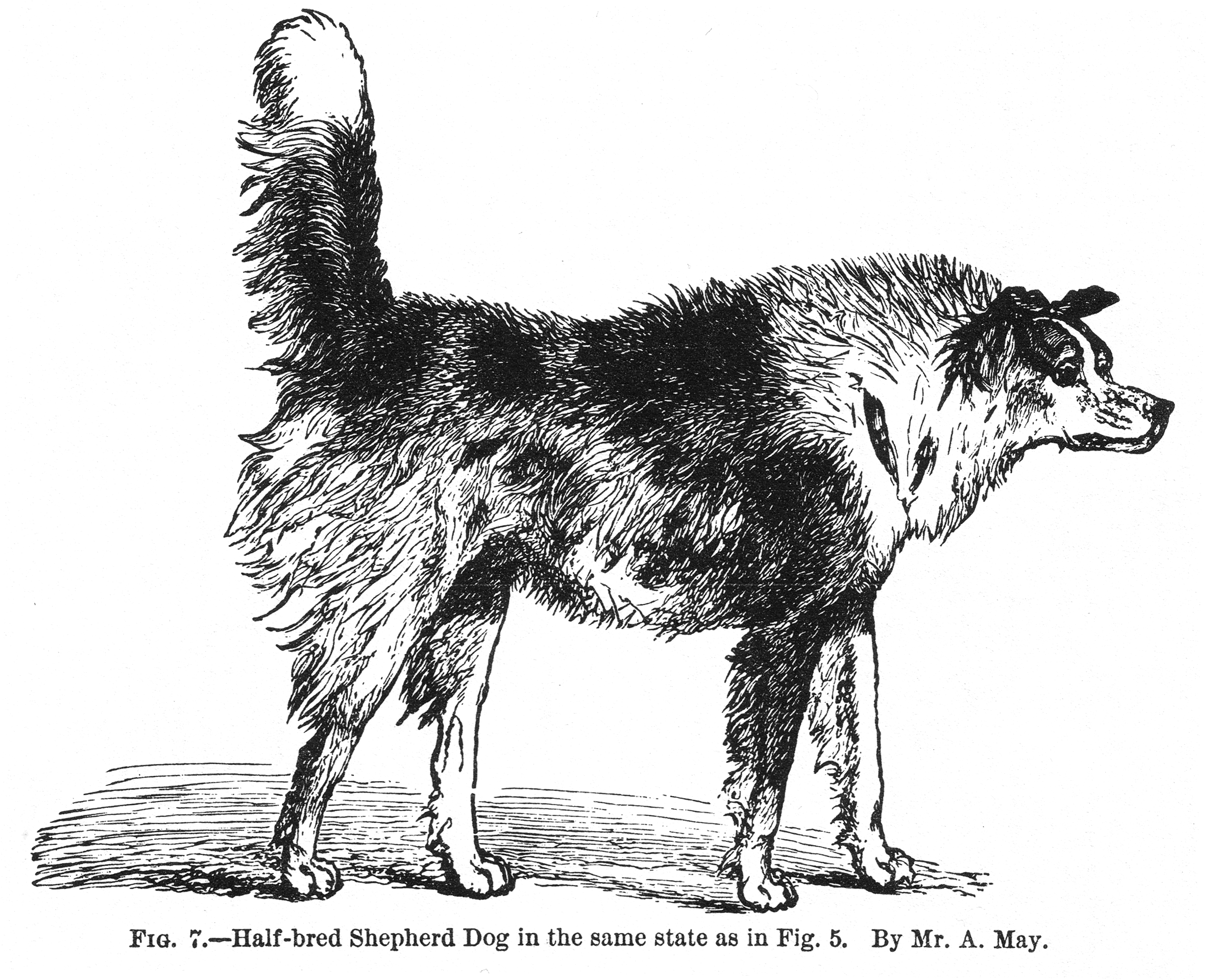
"Half-bred shepherd dog"

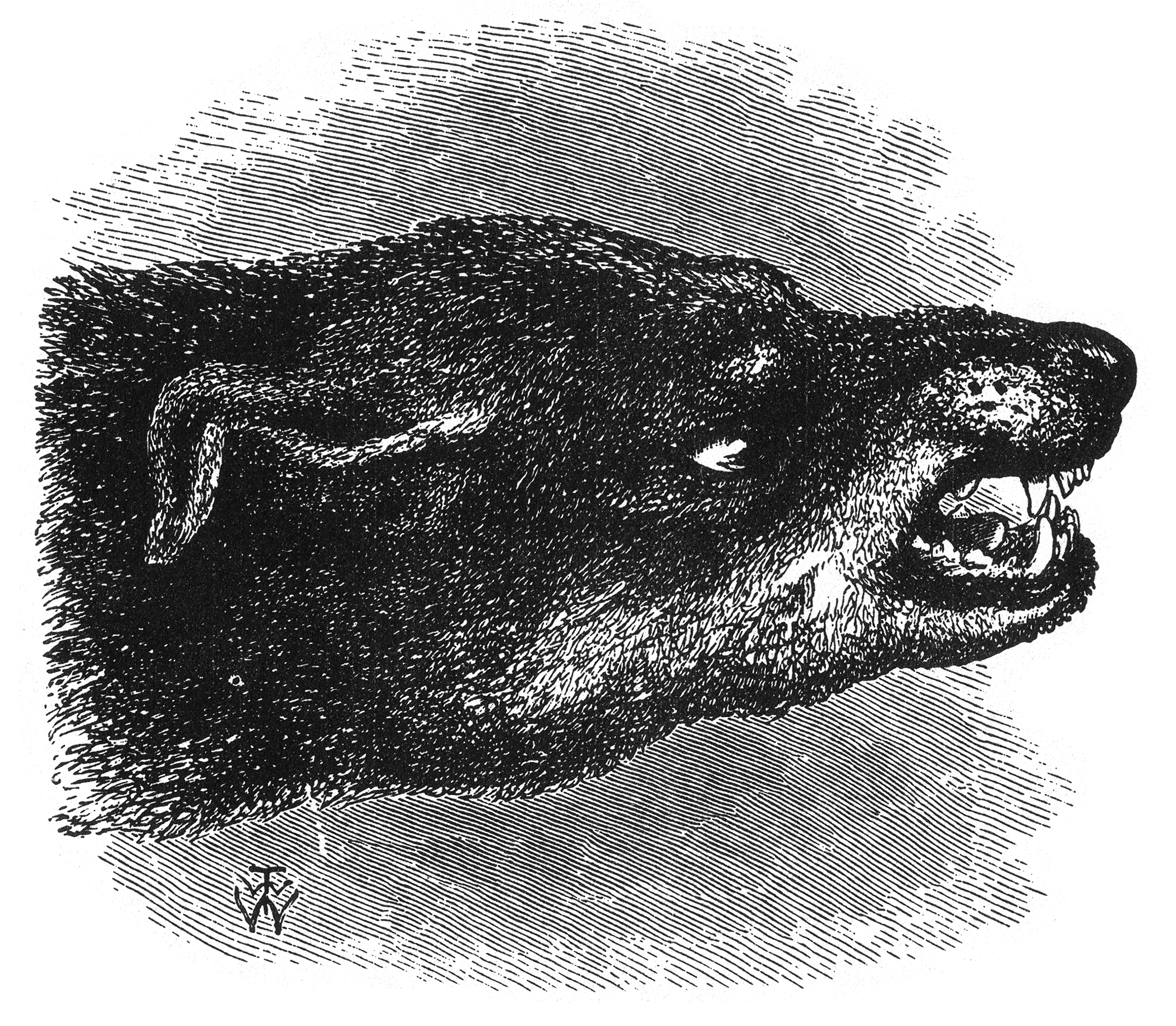
"Head of snarling dog"

In her book On Talking Terms with Dogs, Turid Rugaas identifies around 30 signals that she calls calming signals. The notion of dominance and submission is much debated. In her book, she does not use these terms to differentiate behaviour. She describes calming signals as a way for dogs to calm themselves or other humans/dogs around them. These are some of the signals she identifies:

- Licking/tongue flicks
- Sniffing the ground
- Turning away/turning of the head
- Play bow
- Walking slowly
- Freezing
- Sitting down
- Walking in a curve
- Yawning
- "Smiling"
- Wagging the tail
- Urinating
- Soft face
- Fiddling
- Lying down
- Play sneezing

By moving different parts of their bodies, whether facial expressions or postures, dogs can express a wide range of emotions and signals.

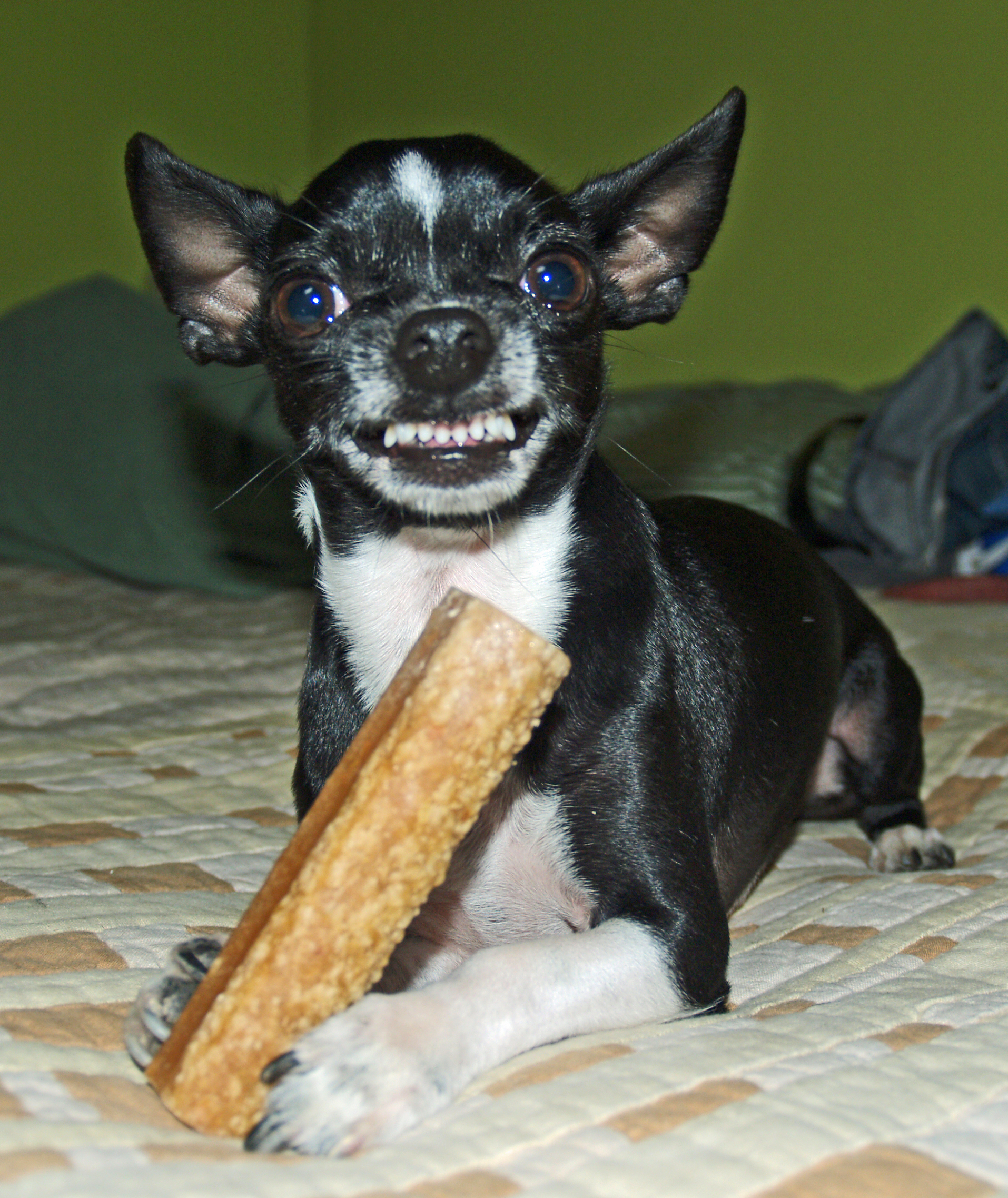
Dog with ears erect means it is alerted, and baring its teeth is a warning signal.

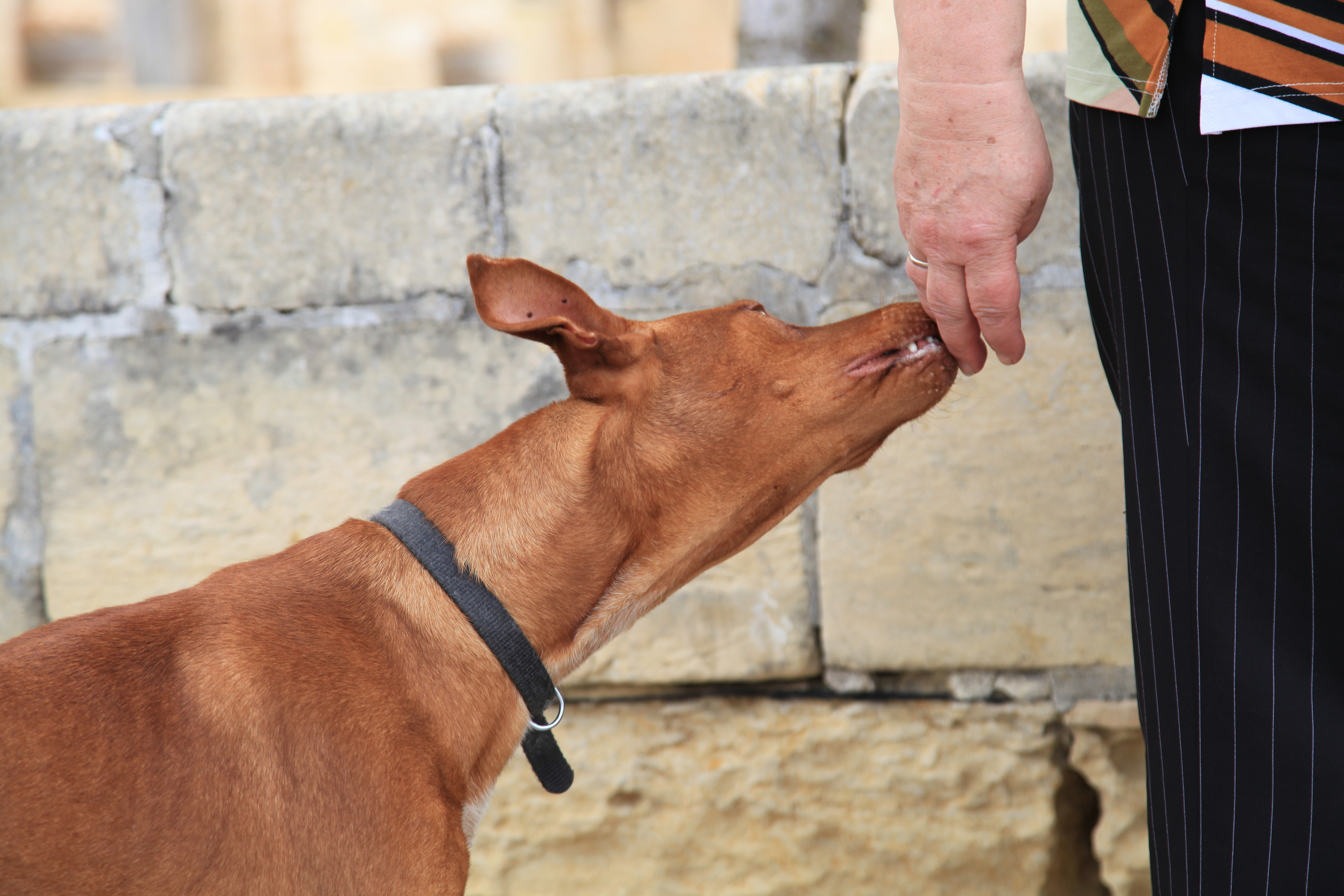
Licking can mean different things depending on the context.

=== Mouth shape ===
- Mouth relaxed and slightly open; tongue perhaps slightly visible or draped over the lower teeth – this is the sign of a content and relaxed dog.
- Mouth closed, no teeth or tongue visible. Usually associated with the dog looking in one direction, and the ears and head may lean slightly forward – shows attention, interest, or appraisal of a situation.
- Curling or pulling the lips to expose the teeth and perhaps the gums – a warning signal. The other party has time to back down, leave, or show a pacifying gesture.
- Mouth elongated as if pulled back, stretching out the mouth opening and showing the rear teeth – a submissive dog yielding to the dominant dog's threat.
- "Smiling:" a calming signal.

=== Head position ===
- A dominant or threatening dog that looks directly at another individual – a threat. It is pointing its weapons (muzzle/teeth).
- A dominant dog turning its head away from a submissive dog – a calming action, indicating that it is not going to attack.
- A less dominant dog approaching a dominant dog with its head down, and only on occasion quickly pointing its muzzle towards the higher-status dog – shows no fight is intended.
- In an alternative interpretation that does not involve dominance and submission, turning the head away is recognized as a calming signal.

=== Yawn ===
Similarly to humans, dogs yawn in an attempt to awaken. Dogs will also yawn when under stress, or as a pacifying signal when being menaced by aggression signals from another dog. Yawning, accompanied by a head turned away from the aggressor, can defuse a potentially threatening situation. It is also recognized as a calming signal.

=== Licking and sniffing ===
Licking behavior has multiple causes and meanings and should not be simply interpreted as affection. Dogs that are familiar with each other may lick each other's faces in greeting, then sniff any moist membranes where odors are strongest (i.e. mouth, nose, anal region, or urogenital region.) Mating behaviors are characterized by licking in a more vigorous manner than used during greetings. Licking can communicate information about dominance, intentions, and state of mind, and, like the yawn, is mainly a pacifying behavior. All pacifying behaviors contain elements of puppy behavior, including licking. Puppies lick themselves and their littermates as part of the cleaning process, and it appears to build bonds. Later in life, licking ceases to be a cleaning function and forms a ritualized gesture indicating friendliness. When stressed, a dog might lick the air, its own lips, or drop down and lick its paws or body. Lip-licking and sniffing are also recognized as calming signals.

=== Ears ===
Dogs' ability to move their ears is different among each breed. In addition, some ears move very little if they are artificially altered or cropped by humans.

- Ears erect or slightly forward – signals attention or alertness.
- Ears pulled back flat against the head, teeth bared – signals an anxious dog that will defend itself.
- Ears pulled back flat against the head, teeth not bared – signals submission.
- Ears pulled slightly back and slightly splayed – signals indecision, or uneasy suspicion that may become aggression.
- Ears flickering, slightly forward, then slightly back or downward – signals indecision with a submissive or fearful component.
- Ears pulled close to the head to give a "round face" – a calming signal.
- Ears pulled back in varying angles – expresses arousal.
- Ears flattened or pressed down – indicates fear, anger, or frustration.
- Ears pressed tightly to the head – expresses extreme fear.
- Ears held sideways – indicates conflicting emotions due to an unsettling situation.

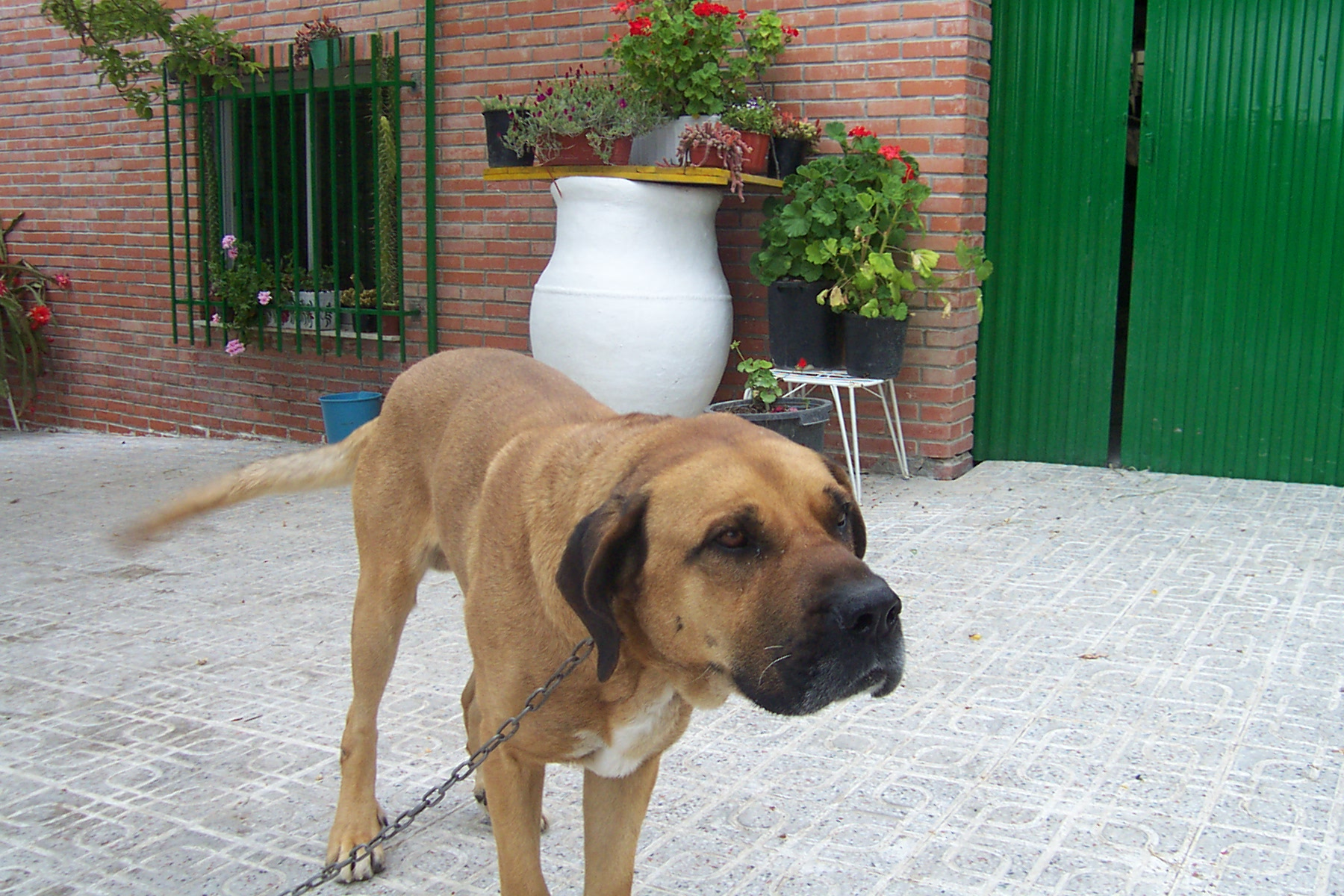
Tail held lower than the horizontal, perhaps with an occasional swishing back and forth – an unconcerned, relaxed dog

=== Eyes ===
When dogs want to threaten a perceived adversary, they will stare. In contrast, dogs will avoid eye contact if trying to decrease tension. They can communicate emotional states by having "soft" eyes or "hard" eyes. Soft eyes are used when a dog feels relaxed and not threatened. Hard eyes are used when feeling tension and unease about a potentially threatening situation. The eyes are slightly closed, the brow area is wrinkled, and their teeth may be showing. A dog should not be approached when they are communicating this way and should be removed from the high tension situation, if possible.

- Direct eye-to-eye stare – a threat, expression of dominance, or warning that an attack is about to begin.
- Eyes turned away to avoid direct eye contact – breaking off eye contact signals submission; it is also recognized as a calming signal.
- Blinking – a calming signal.

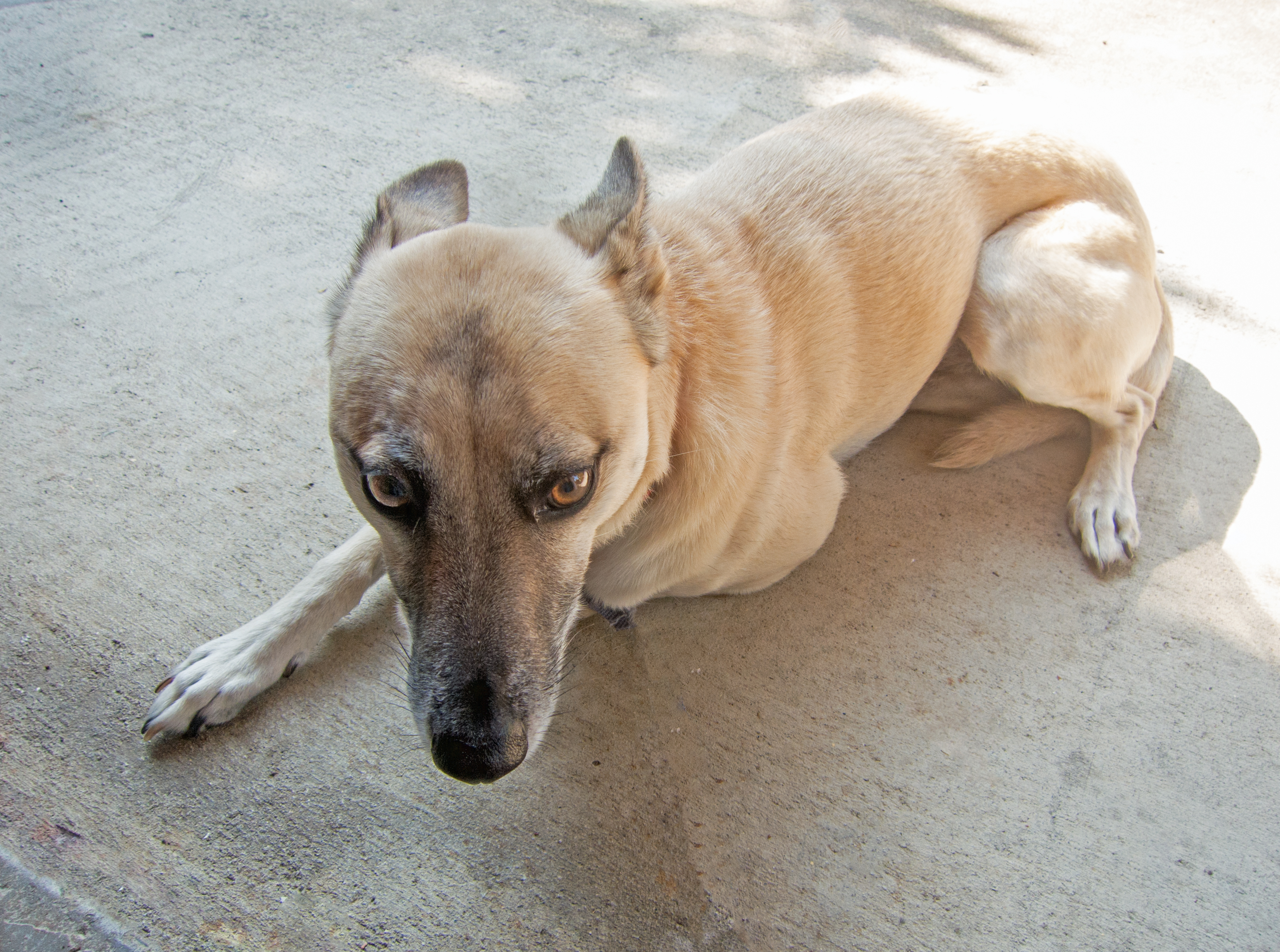
Tail between legs, lying down, ears back, body tight – a submissive dog who is worried or frightened

=== Tail ===
- Tail held high – communicates confidence, arousal, and willingness to be approached by other dogs or humans
- Tail horizontal, pointing away from the dog but not stiff – signals attentiveness.
- Tail horizontally straight out, stiff, and pointing away from the dog – displays an initial challenge that could lead to aggression if feeling threatened or anxious.
- Tail up, between the horizontal and vertical position – conveys dominance .
- Tail up and slightly curved over back – signals confidence; seen in a dominant dog that feels in control.
- Tail held lower than horizontally but still some distance off from the legs, perhaps with an occasional swishing back and forth – an unconcerned, relaxed dog.
- Tail down, near hind legs, legs straight, tail swings back and forth slowly – dog feeling unwell, slightly depressed or in moderate pain.
- Tail down, near hind legs, hind legs bent inwards to lower the body – expresses timidity, apprehension, or insecurity.
- Tail tucked between legs – expresses fear, anxiety, or nervousness; can also be a ritualized pacifying signal to fend off aggression from another dog. The expression tail between one's legs is used in English about people too.
- Tail fast wagging – excitement.
- Slight tail wag, each swing of only a small size – greeting.
- Broad tail wag – friendly.
- Broad tail wag, with wide swings that pull the hips from side to side – happy greeting.
- Slow tail wag with tail at half-mast – unsure of what to do next, insecure.
- Tail wagging is also recognized as a calming signal.
- Tail wagging to the left side of the body – the dog senses a negative situation, such as unfamiliar dogs or people.
- Tail wagging to the right side of the body – the dog feels comfortable and safe.

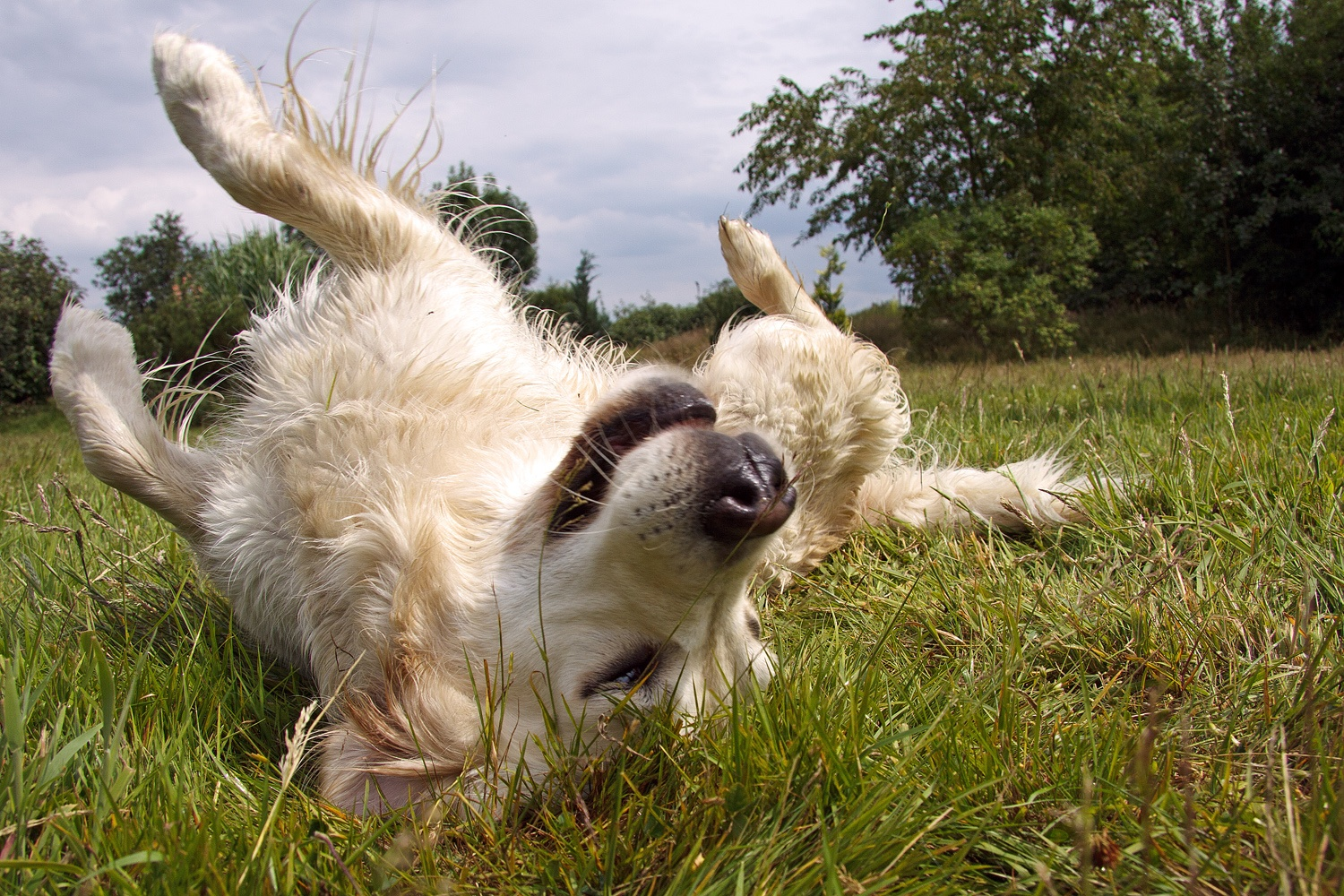
A dog rolls on its back and rubs its shoulders on the ground to display contentment

Dogs are said to exhibit a left-right asymmetry of the tail when interacting with strangers, and will show the opposite right-left motion with people and dogs they know.

Dogs' ability to move their tails can be different among different breeds due to the fact that humans can dock their tails or remove them completely. In addition, some breeds, such as the Australian Stumpy Tail Cattle Dog, are born with extremely short tails, or other breeds, such as the Pembroke Welsh Corgi, may be born without a tail altogether.

=== Body ===
Dogs' bodies alone can communicate a lot. By increasing the size and tension of their bodies and making themselves look larger, they can communicate confidence, alertness, or even threat. Actions meant to reduce the size of the body, such as lowering to the floor with tail tucked and lowered ears, can communicate stress, fear, nerves, or a desire to avoid conflicts.

- Stiff-legged, upright posture or slow, stiff-legged movement forward – dominant dog.
- Body slightly sloped forward, feet braced – challenge to a dominant dog, conflict may follow.
- Hair bristles on back of shoulders – possible aggression, may also indicate fear and uncertainty.
- Lowering the body or cringing while looking up – submission.
- Muzzle nudge – occurs when a submissive dog gently pushes the muzzle of the dominant dog, showing acceptance.
- Dog sits when approached by another, allowing itself to be sniffed – signals acceptance of dominance but does not signal weakness.
- Dog rolls on side or exposes underbelly and completely breaks off eye contact – extreme pacifying or submission signal.
- Dog sits with one front paw slightly raised – stress, social fear and insecurity. It is also recognized as a calming signal.
- Dog rolls on its back and rubs its shoulders on the ground – contentment.
- Dog crouches with front legs extended, rear body and tail up, facing its playmate directly – classic "play-bow" to commence play. It is also recognized as a calming signal.

== Auditory ==
Long-distance contact calls are common in Canidae, typically in the form of either barks (termed "pulse trains") or howls (termed "long acoustic streams"). The long-distance howling of wolves and coyotes is one way in which dogs communicate.

By the age of four weeks, the dog has developed the majority of its vocalizations. The dog is the most vocal canid and is unique in its tendency to bark in a myriad of situations. Barking appears to have little more communication functions than excitement, fighting, the presence of a human, or simply because other dogs are barking. Subtler signs such as discreet bodily and facial movements, body odors, whines, yelps, and growls are the main sources of actual communication. The majority of these subtle communication techniques are employed at a close proximity to another, but for long-range communication, only barking and howling are employed.

One study has indicated that dogs are able to tell how big another dog is just by listening to its growl. The research also shows that dogs do not, or cannot, misrepresent their size, and this is the first time research has shown animals can determine another's size by the sound they make. The test, using images of many kinds of dogs, showed a small and big dog and played a growl. Twenty of the 24 test dogs looked at the image of the appropriately sized dog first and looked at it longest.

Depending on the context, a dog's bark can vary in timing, pitch, and amplitude. It is possible that these have different meanings.

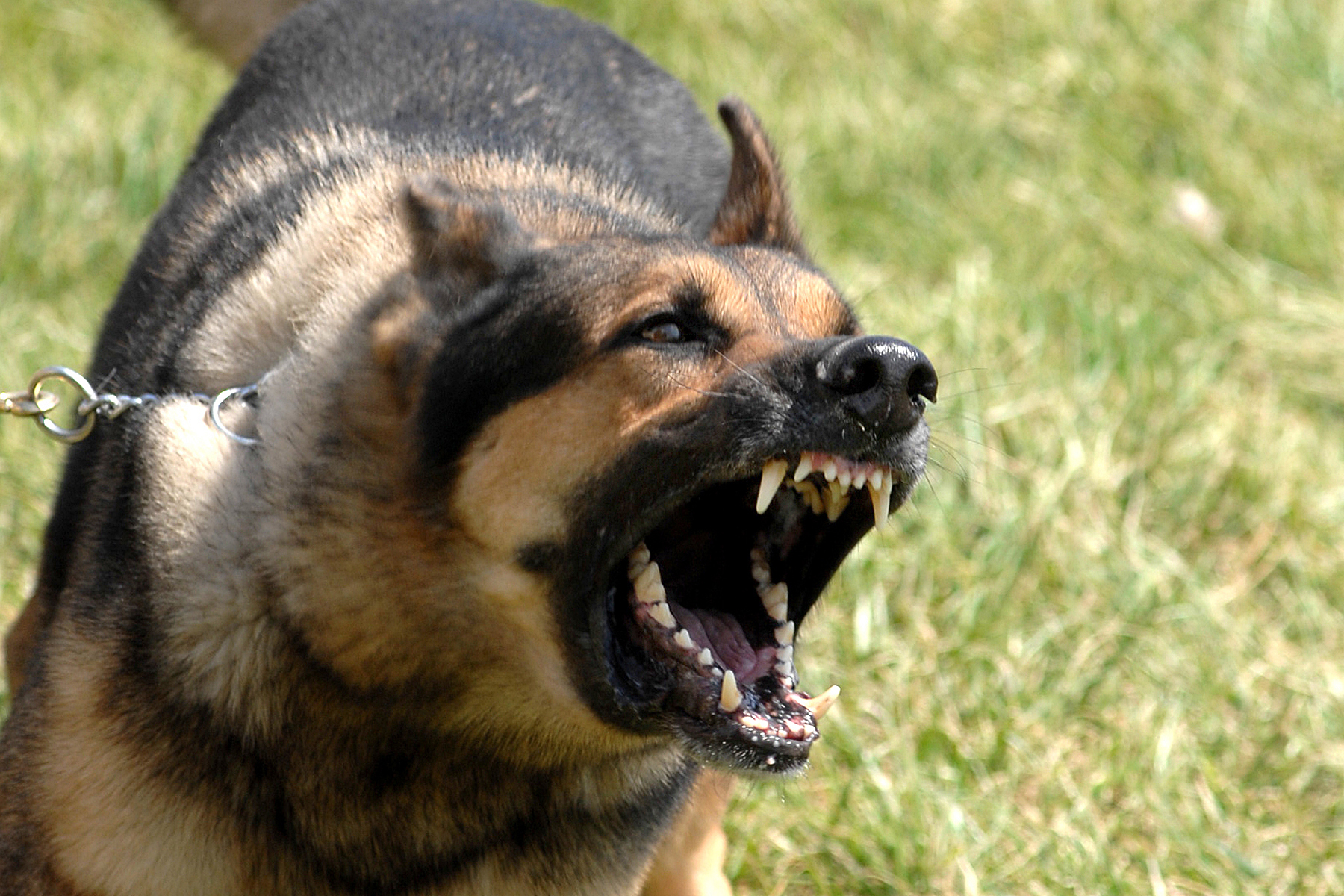
Rapid barking with a midrange pitch is the basic alarm bark.

=== Barks ===
- Barking in rapid strings of 3 or 4 with pauses in between, midrange pitch – alerting call, the dog senses something but not yet defined as a threat.
- Rapid barking, midrange pitch – basic alarm bark.
- Barking still continuously but a bit slower and lower pitch – imminent threat, prepare to defend.
- A prolonged string of barks, with moderate to long intervals between each one – lonely, in need of companionship, often exhibited when confined.
- One or two sharp, short barks of high or midrange pitch – typical greeting sound, usually replaces the alarm bark when visitor is identified as friendly or the dog feels insecure.
- Single sharp short bark, lower midrange pitch – annoyance, used by a mother dog disciplining her puppies or by a dog disturbed from its sleep.
- Single short bark, higher midrange pitch – surprised or startled.
- Stutter bark, midrange pitch – used to initiate play.
- Rising bark – indicates having fun, used during play-fighting or when the owner is about to throw an object.

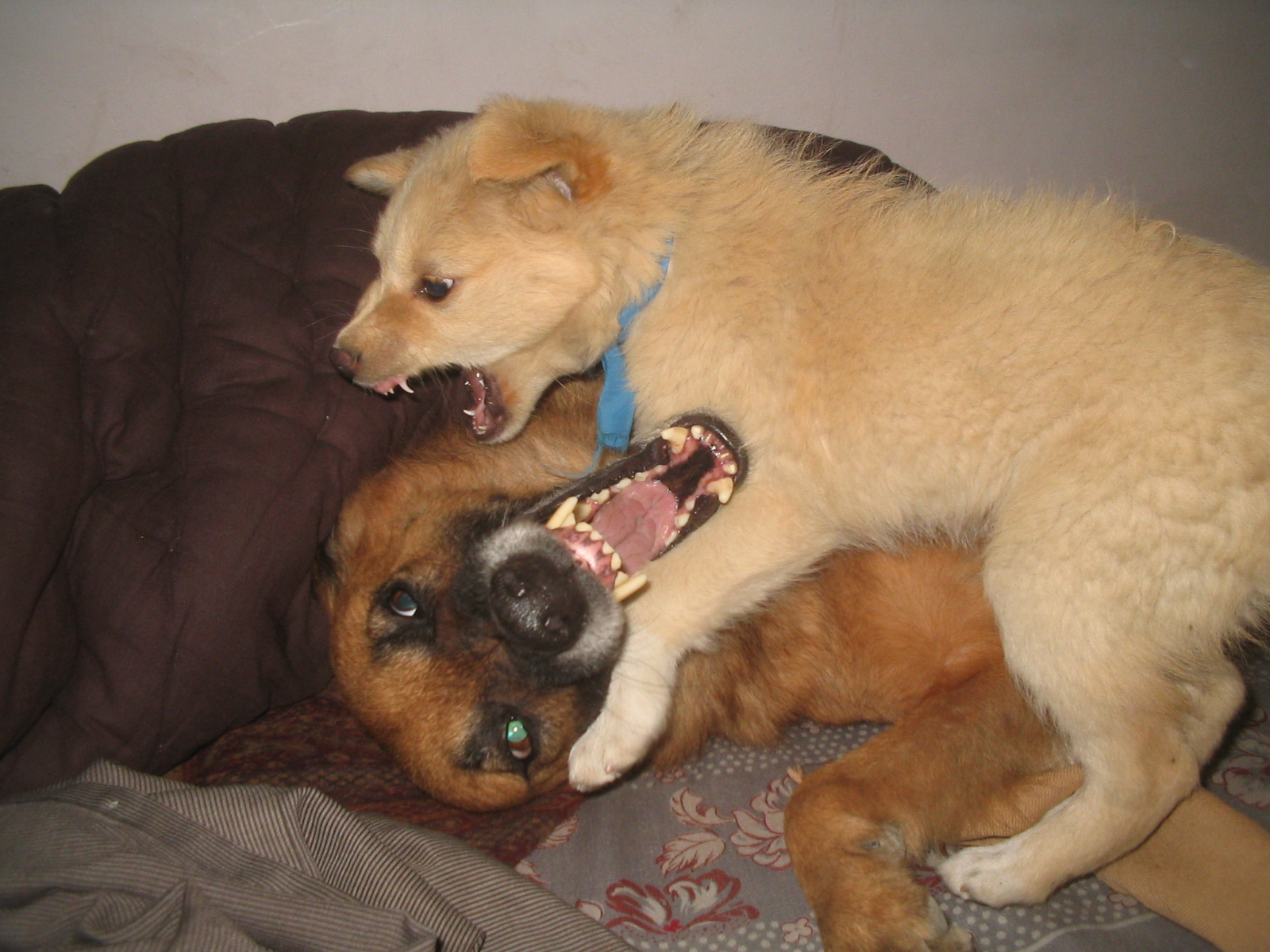
Two dogs communicating a warning; note the teeth baring and lip curl.

=== Growls ===
- Soft, low-pitched growling that seems to come from the chest – used as a threat by a dominant dog.
- Soft growling that is not so low-pitched and seems more obviously to come from the mouth – stay away.
- Low-pitched growl-bark – growl leading to a bark is both a threat and a call for assistance.
- Higher midrange-pitched growl-bark – higher pitch means less confident, frightened but will defend itself.
- Undulating growl, going from midrange to high midrange – dog is terrified, it will either defend itself or run away.
- Noisy growl, medium and higher pitch, with teeth hidden from view – can signal intense concentration, may be found during play-aggression, however knowledge of the whole body language is required for a definitive answer.

=== Howls ===
- Yip-howl – lonely, in need of companionship.
- Howling – indicates the dog is present, or indicating that this is its territory.
- Bark-howl, 2–3 barks followed by a mournful howl – dog is relatively isolated, locked away with no companionship, calling for company or a response from another dog.
- Baying – can be heard during tracking to call pack-mates to the quarry.

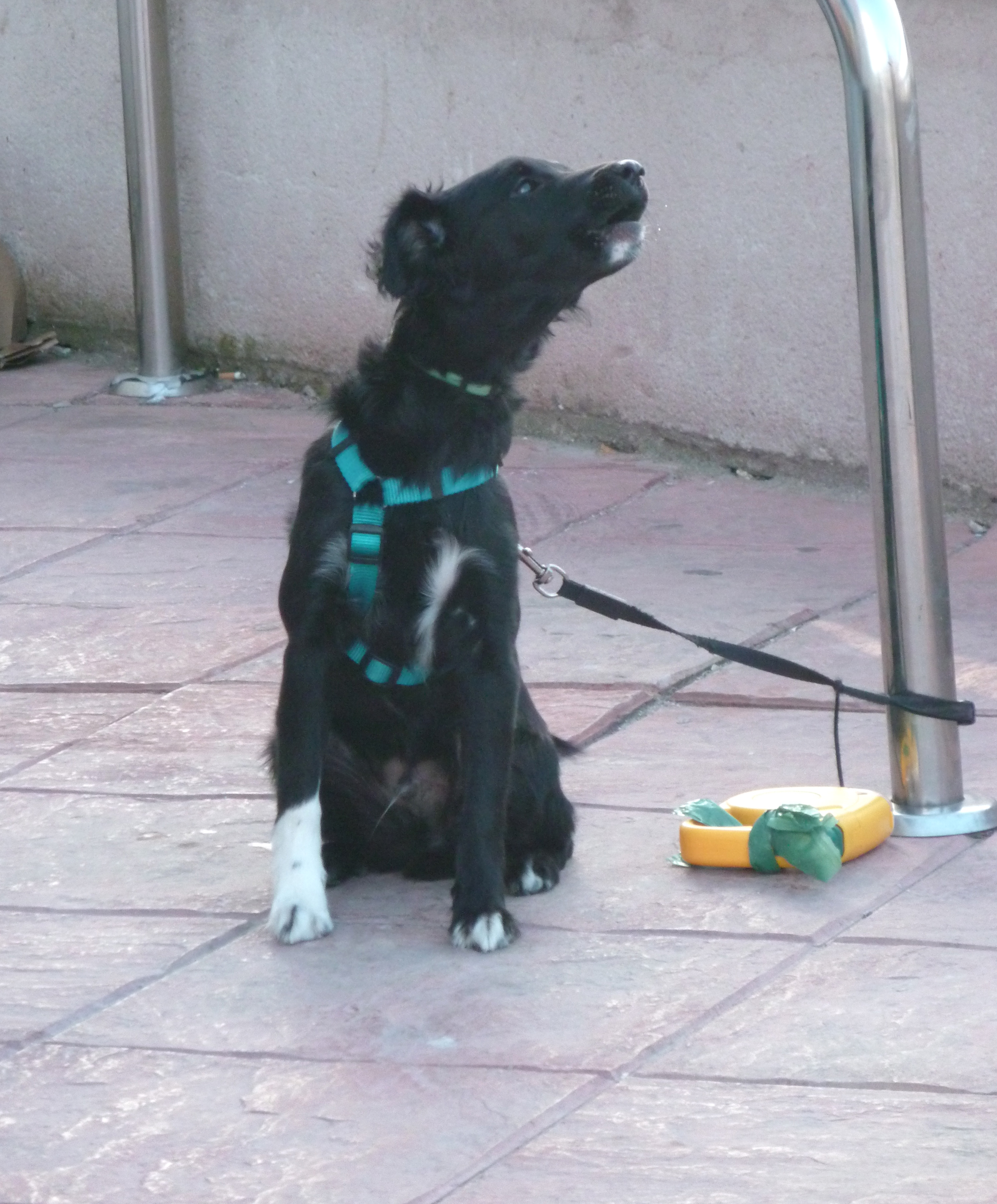
Dog howling indicates the dog is present or in its territory.

=== Whines and whimpers ===
Whining and whimpers are short, high pitched sounds designed to bring the listener closer to show either fear or submission on the behalf of the whiner or whimperer. These are also the sounds that puppies make as pacifying and soliciting sounds.

- Soft whining and whimpering – hurting or scared.
- Moan or moan-yodel, lower pitched than whines or whimpers – spontaneous pleasure or excitement.
- Single yelp or high-pitched bark – response to sudden, unexpected pain such as a too-hard play bite.
- Series of yelps – severe fear or pain.

=== Screaming ===
A yelp for several seconds in length much like a human child, then repeated – anguish or agony, a call to the pack-mates for help, is rarely heard. It could be an indication of severe injury. It is recommended to take a dog to a veterinarian immediately if they scream.

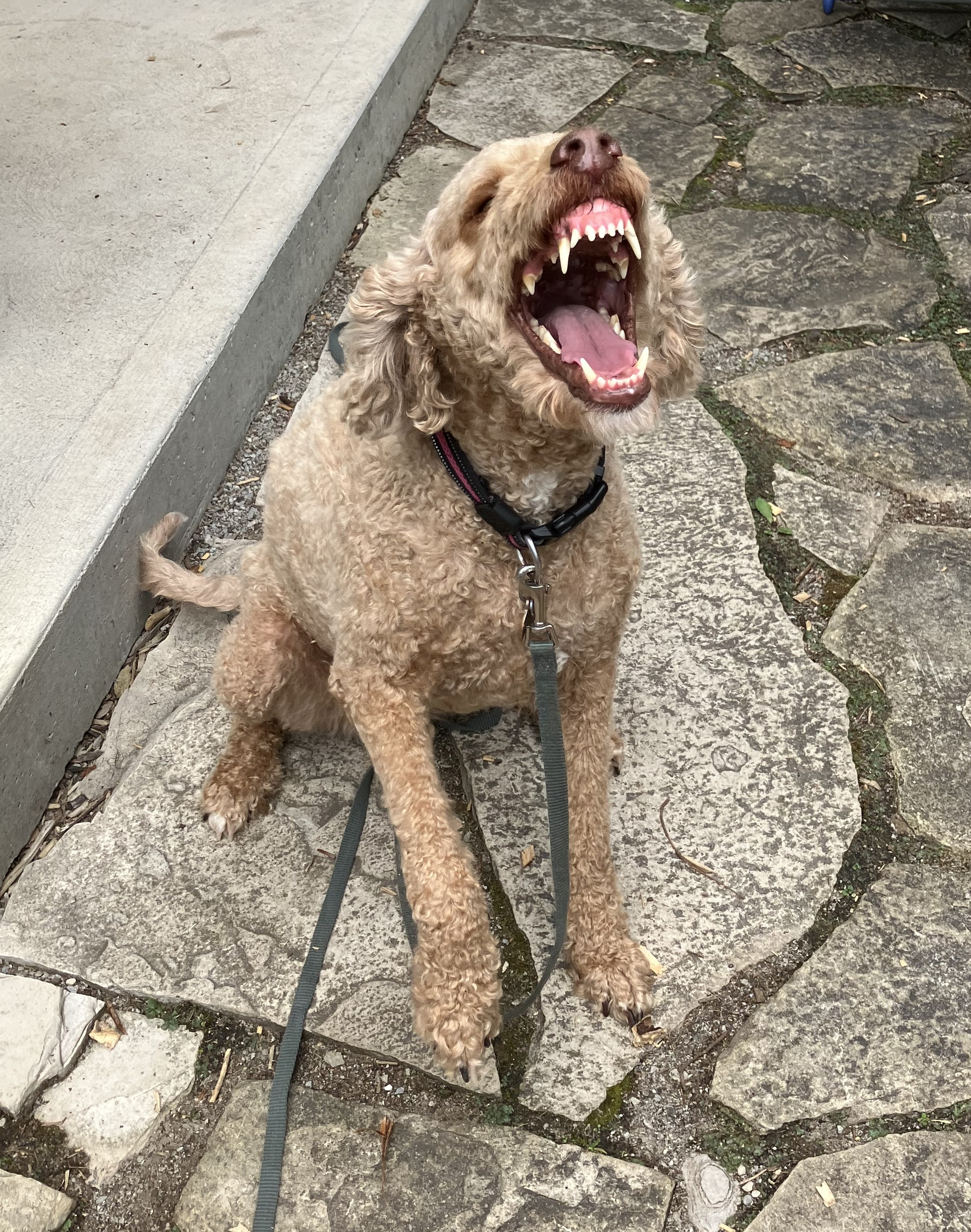
A play sneeze

=== Panting ===
Panting is an attempt to regulate body temperature. Excitement can raise the body temperature in both humans and dogs. Although not an intentional communication, if the dog pants rapidly even though it is not exposed to warm conditions or intense physical activity, then this signals excitement due to stress.

=== Sighs ===
Sighs are an expression of emotion, usually when the dog is lying down with its head on its paws. When the eyes are half-closed, it signals pleasure and contentment. When the eyes are fully open, it signals displeasure or disappointment.

=== Play sneezing ===
Play sneezing is another calming signal that dogs use to indicate that they are not being aggressive, or that they are just playing. Play sneezes are not actual sneezes, but more of an expulsion of air that resembles a sneeze, and occur frequently during play.

== Olfactory ==
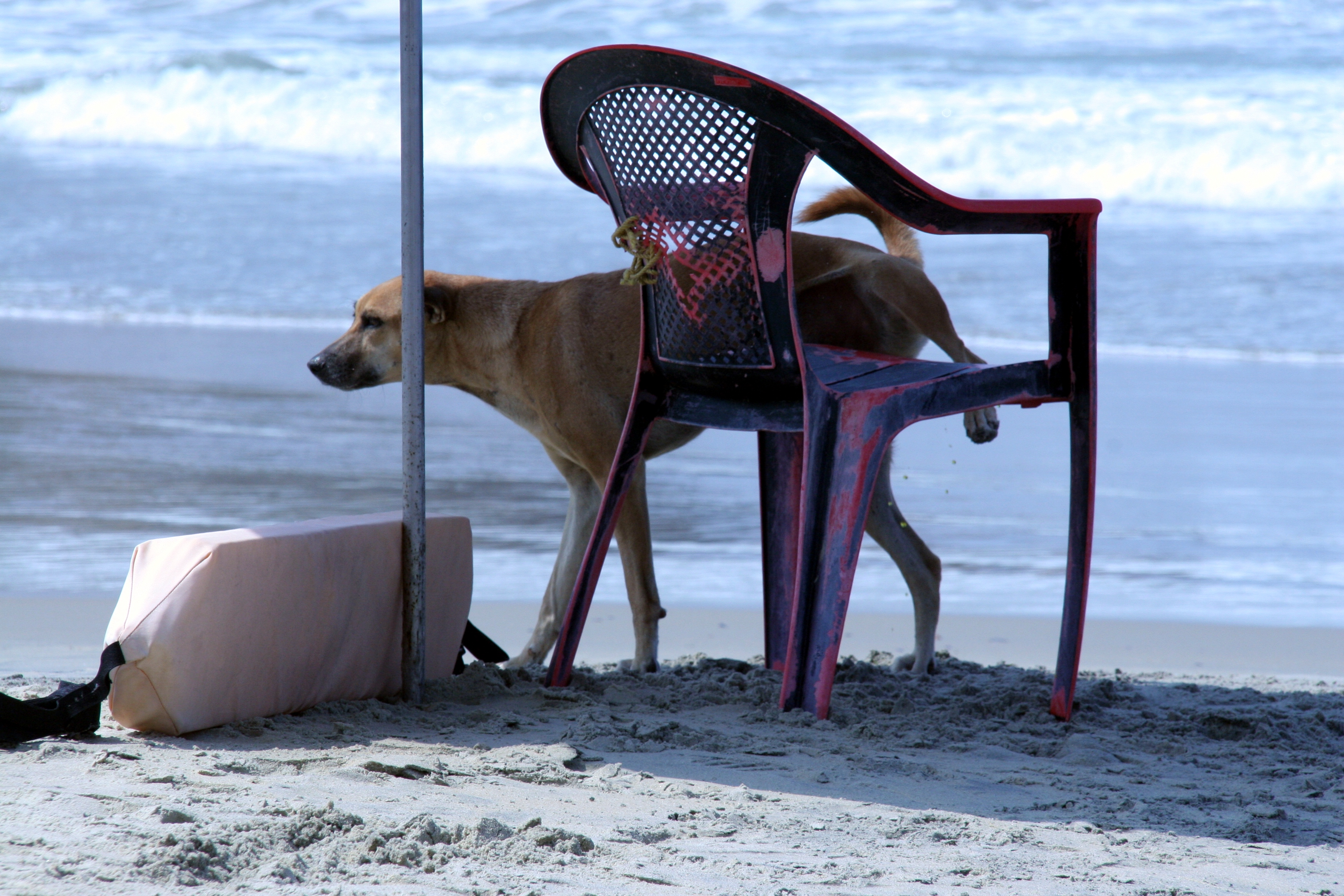
"Raised-leg urination" posture

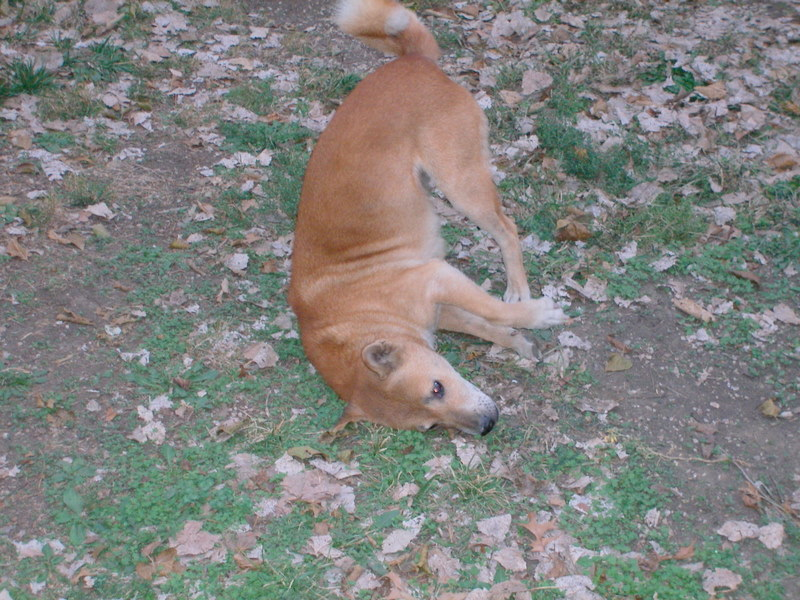
Scent rubbing

Dogs have an olfactory sense 40 times more sensitive than a human's and they commence their lives operating almost exclusively on smell and touch. Pheromones are the special scents that dogs use for communication. Pheromones are composed of natural chemicals that mediate olfactory communication with conspecifics. These pheromones that contain chemical signals serve to send information to other dogs about social status, age, sexual or reproductive status, aggressive behavior, and territorial marking. They can serve to either attract or repel other dogs.

Pheromone signals are received in the vomeronasal organ (VNO) that is included in the olfactory tract. In order for a dog to detect a stimulus, or odor, the VNO has to be opened. It is opened when a pheromone attaches to the membrane of the nervous cells in the vomeronasal organ. From the VNO, the pheromone signals are sent to the accessory olfactory bulb and transferred to the amygdala. The pheromone will finally be sent to the ventromedial hypothalamus, where the signal is perceived. The Flehmen Response is a behavior in dogs in which the upper lip curves up to reveal to their teeth; this behavior strengthens the intake of pheromones.

Chemical signals are diffused into the environment by anal secretions, pedal glands, urine and fecal deposits, body odor, and rubbing their body on certain items. This is called scent marking, when individuals leave strong smelling scents on specific areas in the environment in order to mark their territory. The scent mark contains chemical messages about the sender. For example, when a female is in estrus, she will urinate more frequently to attract a potential mate. The urine contains information about a female's reproductive status and it also conveys messages to the receiver about the female's location. The compound p-hydroxybenzoate is found in the pheromones that attract a male to a female in estrus.

The most common type of scent marking is urine-marking to identify their territory. Adult males prefer to mark vertical surfaces with urine, using the raised-leg posture. The raised-leg posture provides increased dispersal of the elevated mark, allowing the wind to carry it further. Females; however, tend to utilize a squatting posture and urinate less frequently than males. Additionally, smaller dogs can use a higher leg raise when urinating to embellish their competitive ability.

Overmarking is when an individual covers another's scent mark with its own. Both males and females practice overmarking, although it is more common in males. Overmarking is used to send information about social status and dominance. It enables dogs to find potential mates or acknowledge potential competitors. Such as males may overmark a female's urine to guard a potential mate.

Scratching the ground is a common behavior seen after urination or defecation and is another way in which chemical signals are secreted. Pheromones are excreted from the pedal glands, aiding in territorial marking or adding additional odor to the scent mark. The chances of a dog scratching the ground increases when the individual is aggressively aroused. It is also usually followed by another male counter marking with urine in order to cover the area with their own scent and more prevalent when there is a female in estrus around.

Dogs also receive information about a conspecific by sniffing particular glands. When greeting, dogs tend to be more attentive to the neck, face, inguinal, and peripheral areas. There are specific glands in these areas that produce different odors, such as glands at the corner of the mouth, in the ear pinnae, the preputial and vaginal glands, and anal glands. Dogs gain social information by sniffing particular odors secreted from these areas. Dogs can also gain information from anal secretions. All canines have two symmetric sacs on either side of the anal sphincter that produce anal secretions during defecation. These are important in marking territory and sending information about social status.

== See also ==
- Wolf communication
