= Rugaas =

Rugaas is a Norwegian surname. Notable people with the surname include:

- Bendik Rugaas (1942–2025), Norwegian librarian and politician
- Turid Rugaas (fl. 1948), Norwegian dog trainer and author
