= Turid Rugaas =

Norwegian dog trainer

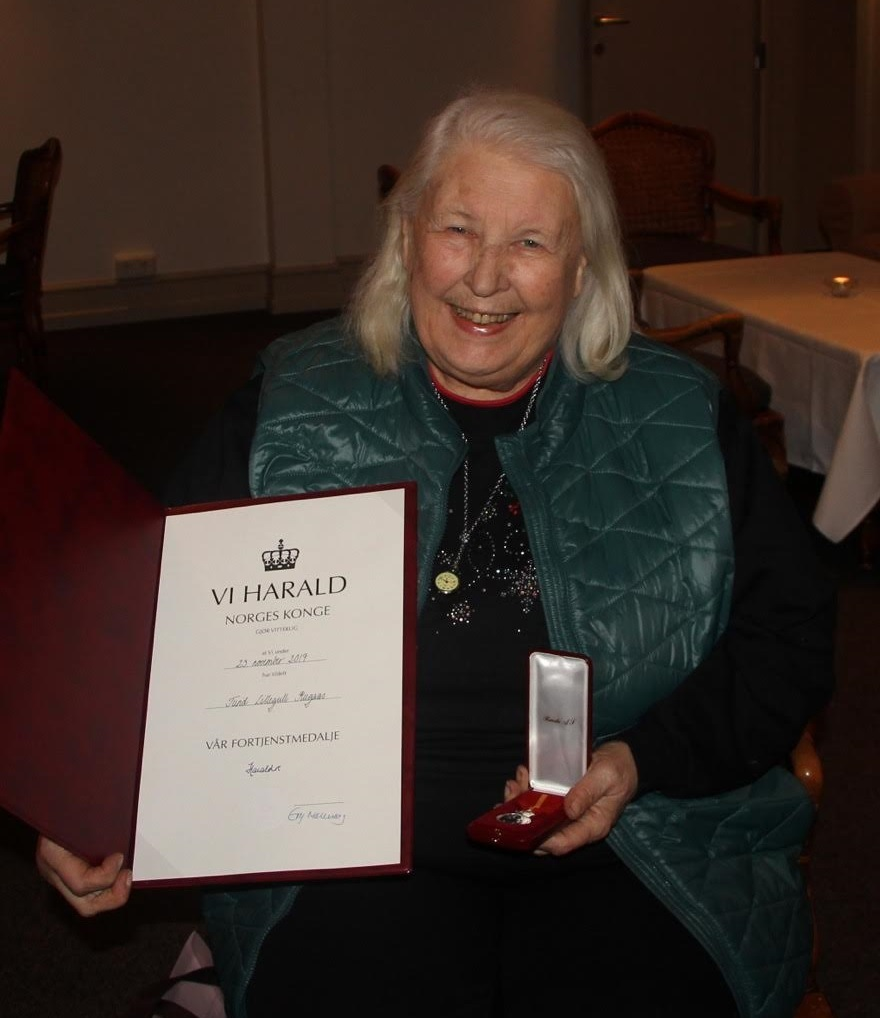
- Turid with her Badge of Honour from Norwegian King, HM King Harald VII

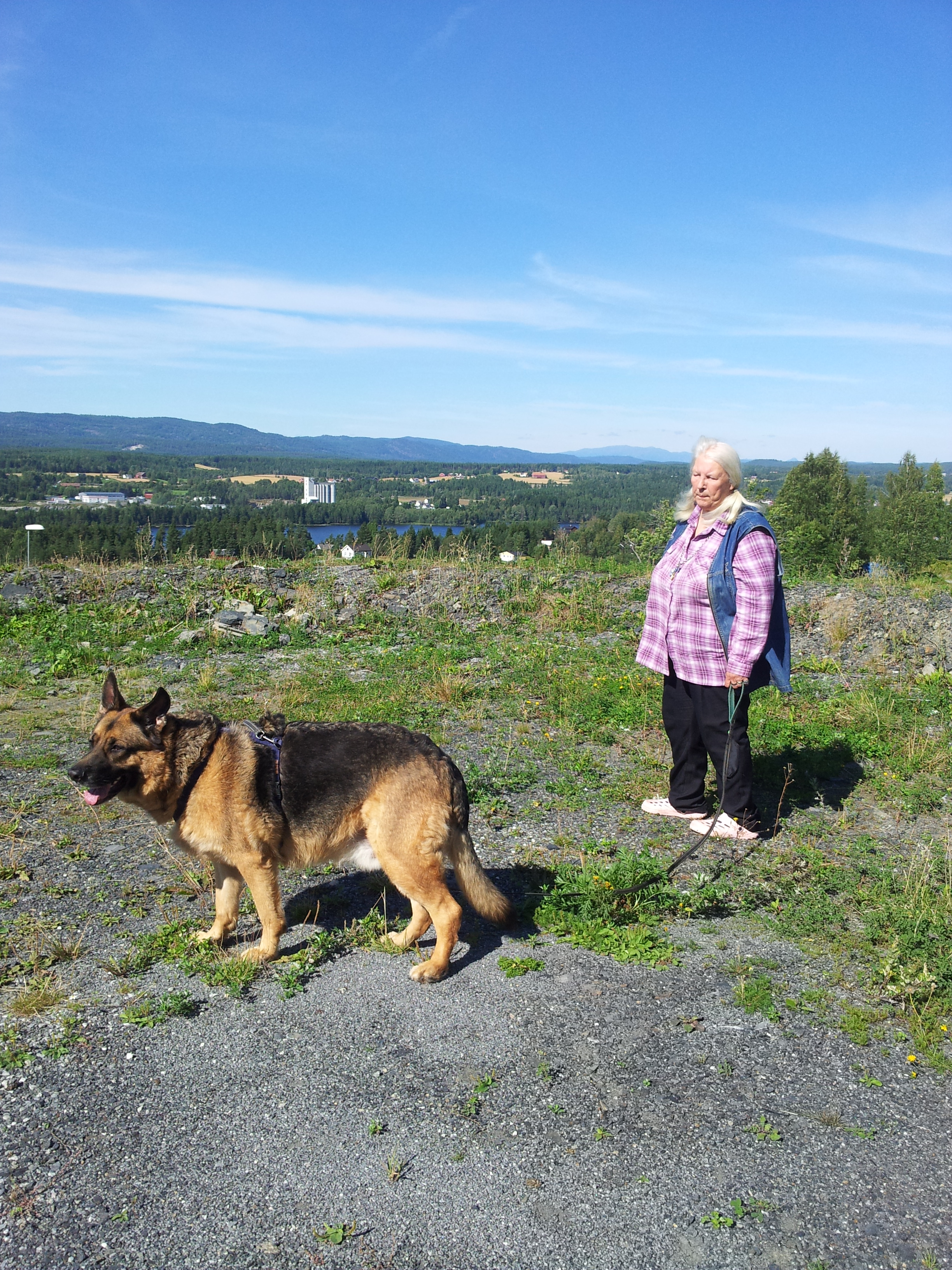
Rugaas and her dog McKenzie

Turid Rugaas is a Norwegian dog trainer. Rugaas got her first dog in 1948 and has been training since 1969. She set up her dog school Hagan Hundeskole in 1984 on her farm on overlooking the fjords of Norway. She started educating other dog trainers and giving seminars 1992. Since then conducted workshops in 12 different countries with students from 24 countries. She is now retired from actual dog training, but continues to conduct seminars and workshops internationally.

She has published several books and DVDs including the popular best seller On Talking Terms with Dogs. She has identified some 30 calming signals to explain the communication of dogs.

Rugaas is the author of several books and DVDs that have been seminal in the subject of dog communication that have since helped many dog trainers, behaviourists and ethologists understand dog language. She founded the Pet Dog Trainers of Europe (PDTE) and is the current president of the organization that is leading the concept of humane dog training in Europe. Rugaas gives talks and seminars throughout Europe, and runs summer camps.

She has released a biographical film titled A Boat Trip with Turid Rugaas.

On 27th Nov, 2017, Rugaas was awarded the King's Badge of Honour, by the Norwegian King, HM Harald V|I for her contributions over the last 40 years in the field of canine behaviour.

== Work and Methodology ==
Rugaas has been focusing on developing new methods and natural methods of training. Natural methods of training use activities that are more natural for dogs to solve behavioural problems. Natural methods of training use simple tools like Nosework, activating the cerebral cortex of a dog via his natural curiosity and using his natural social skills to develop in neural networks. Natural methods of training focus a lot on understanding dog communication and being able to communicate back with the dog. Towards this end, Rugaas observed and documented several signals that the dogs use as part of their repertoire. She called these Calming Signals.

Rugaas has helped mentor several projects that help understand dogs better in their natural environment. One such project is the Dog Pulse project that aims to measure the pulse of a dog to see if people can give calming signals to a dog and if that indeed has an effect on the reducing the heart rate of a dog and calming the dog down. It also aims to actually prove quantitatively that when a dog is giving out calming signals, the dog is indeed experiencing stress and hence elevated heart rate.

Rugaas has carried out a "pee study" looking at the nature of canine urinating patterns. She has also looked at improving methods of 'testing' dogs. Conventional methods for testing of dogs involves putting dogs through increasing scary activities till they reach a point they cannot cope and to determine how long it takes a dog to get to that point. Rugaas is working on changing these tests in Europe to instead focus on the dog's potential by allowing him to show what he is capable of in terms of problem solving, without having to scare him or confuse him.

== Countries ==
Rugaas has conducted workshops in 12 countries and seminars in several more. She has students that span 24 countries. Trainers who follow her methodology can be found in some of these countries: Norway, Sweden, Finland, Denmark, Iceland, Russia, Poland, Czech Republic, Croatia, Austria, Switzerland, Germany, Netherlands, Belgium, France, Spain (incl. Mallorca and canary Islands), Greece, Italy, USA, Canada, Australia, New Zealand, England, Scotland, Korea, Japan, Taiwan

== Photo gallery ==
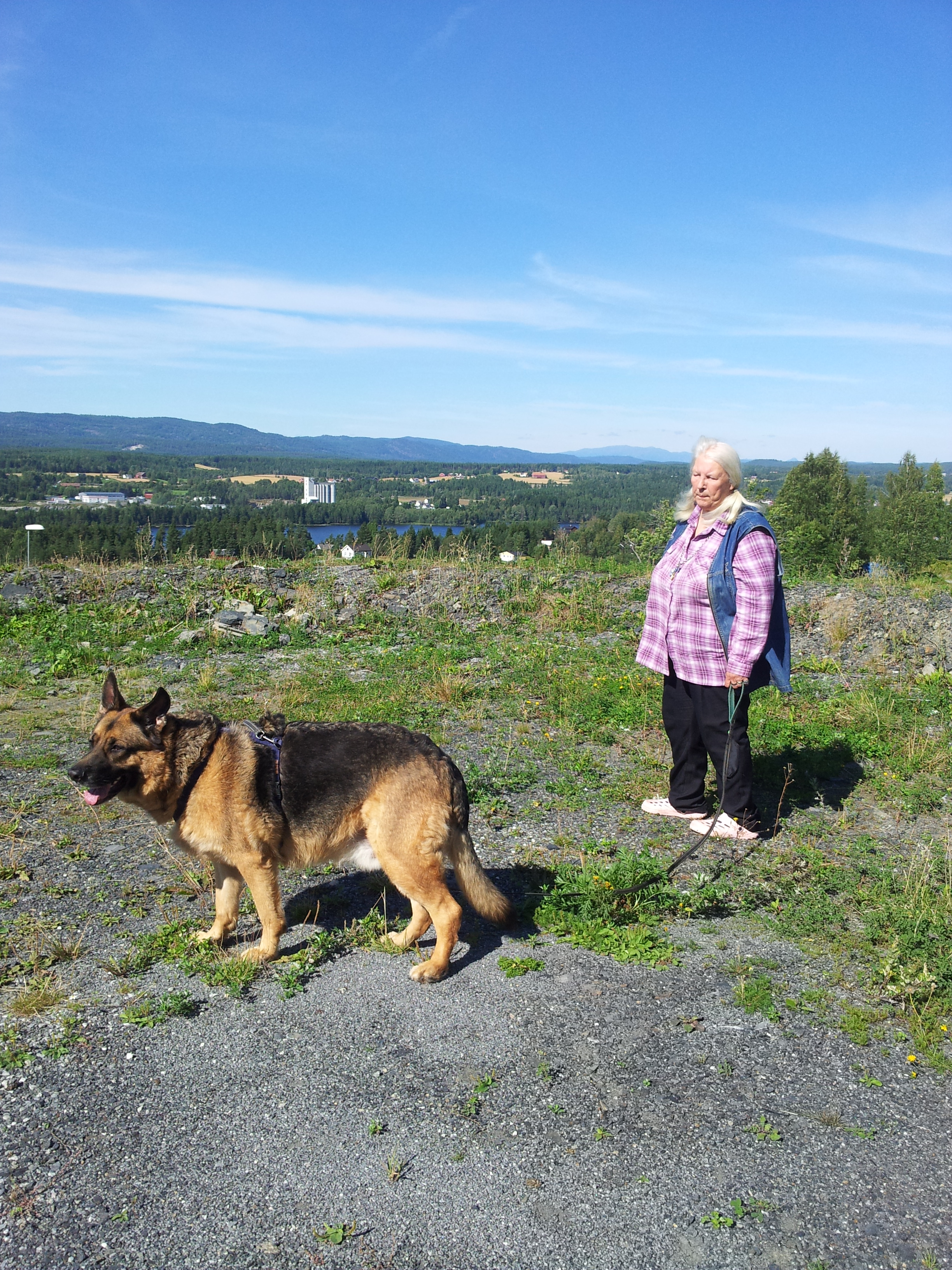
Rugaas and her dog McKenzie

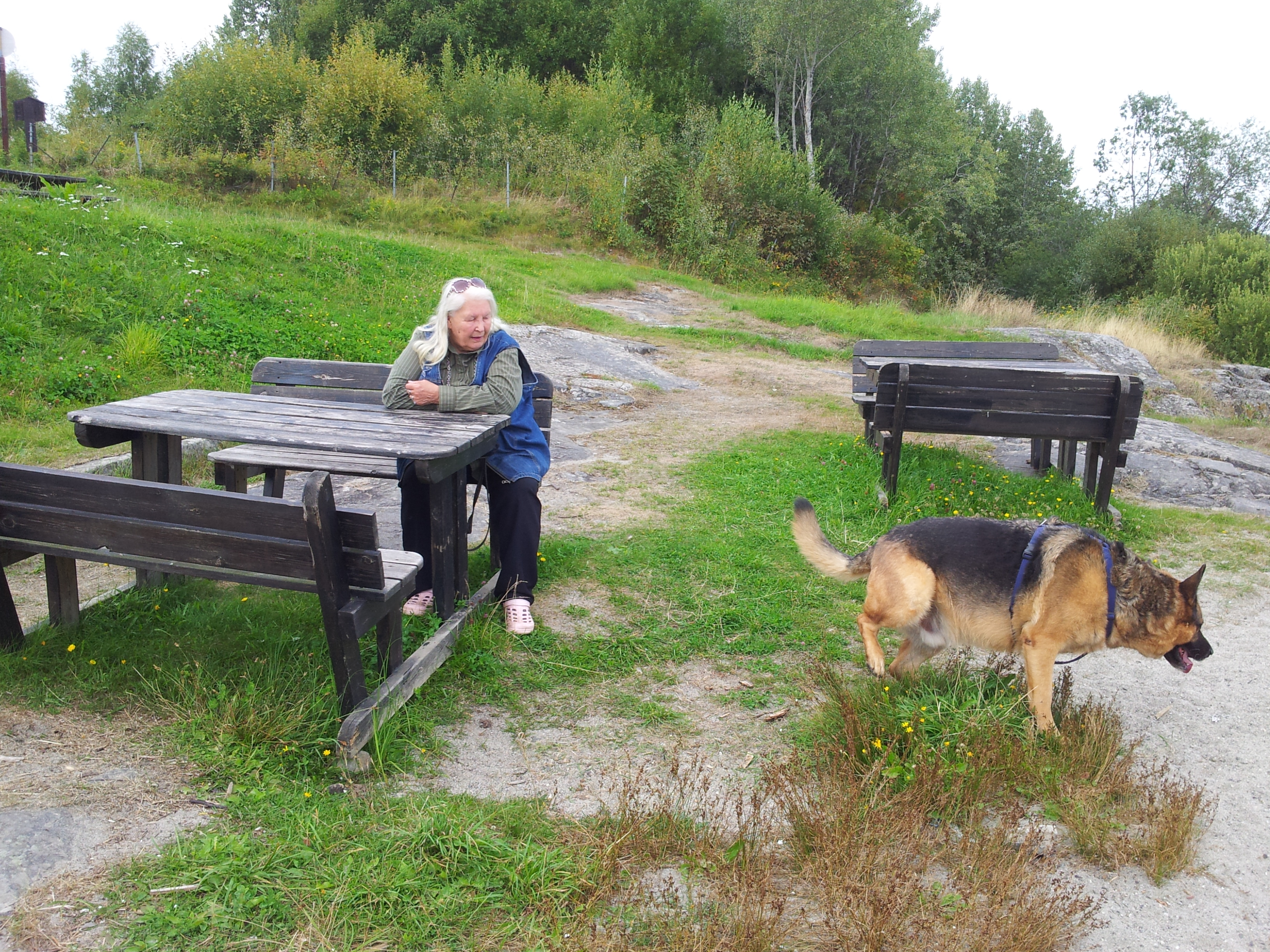
Rugaas and her dog McKenzie

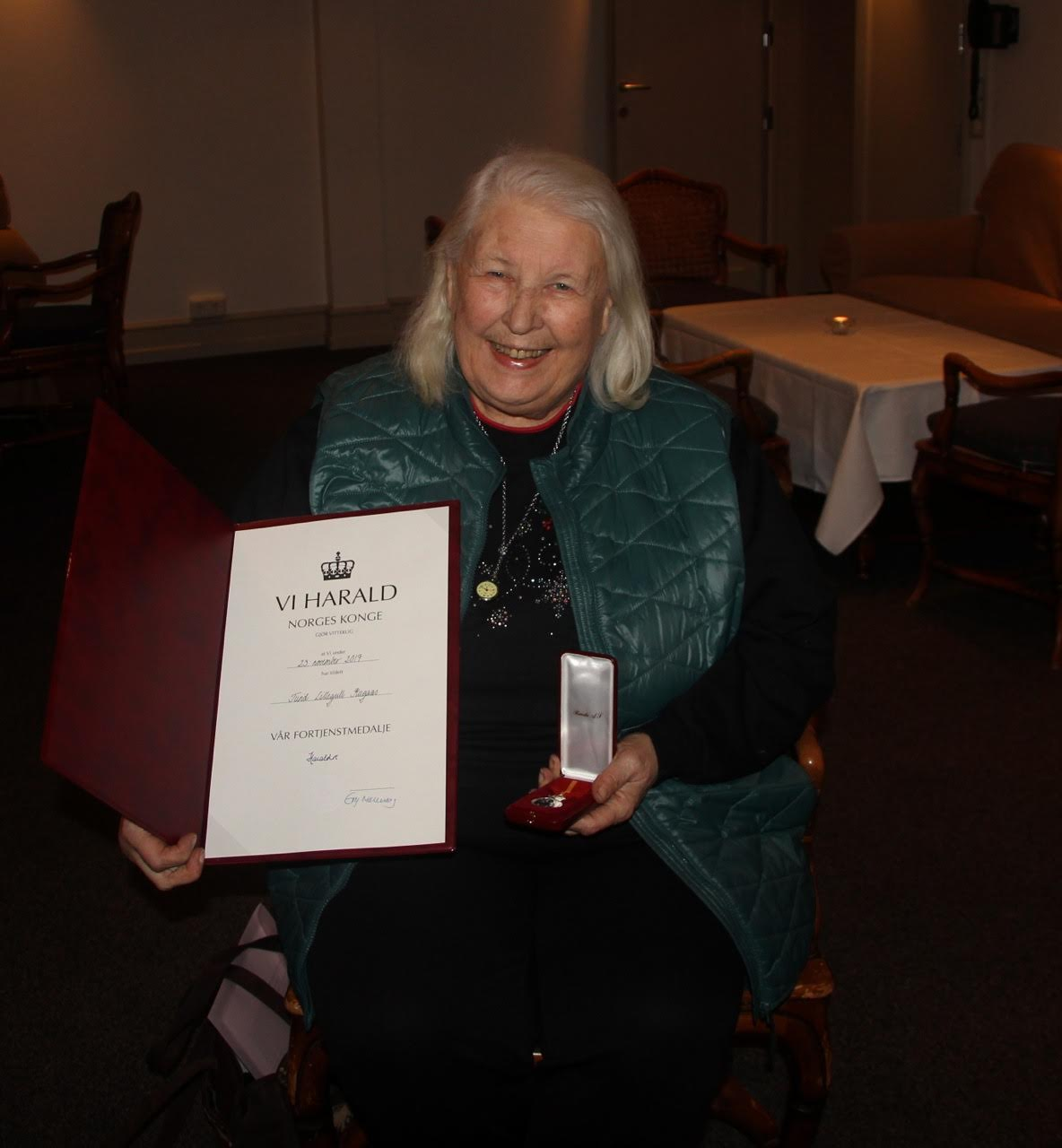
Turid with her Badge of Honour from Norwegian King, HM King Harald VII

== Bibliography ==
- On Talking Terms with Dogs: Calming Signals Dogwise Publishing, 2005. ISBN 1929242360
- My Dog Pulls. What Do I Do? Dogwise Publishing, 2005. ISBN 1929242239
- Barking: The Sound of a Language Dogwise Publishing, 2005. ISBN 1929242514
- Pet dog trainers of Europe Code of Ethics: a way to take dog training into the 21st century. In: Journal of Veterinary Behavior. Vol. 6, Issue 1. January–February 2011.

== DVDs ==
- The Wee Signs of Dogs
- Puppies
- What do I do when my dog pulls
- Search games (with Anne Lil Kvam)
- Scent Discrimination (with Anne Lil Kvam)

== Essays ==
- Calming Signals - The art of survival
- Turid, Rugaas. "About growing up". PDTE. Pet Dog Trainers of Europe.

== Recognition ==
- On 27th Nov, 2017, Rugaas was awarded the King's Badge of Honour, by the Norwegian King, HM Harald V|I for her contributions over the last 40 years in the field of canine behaviour.
