= Calming signals =

Patterns of behavior in dogs

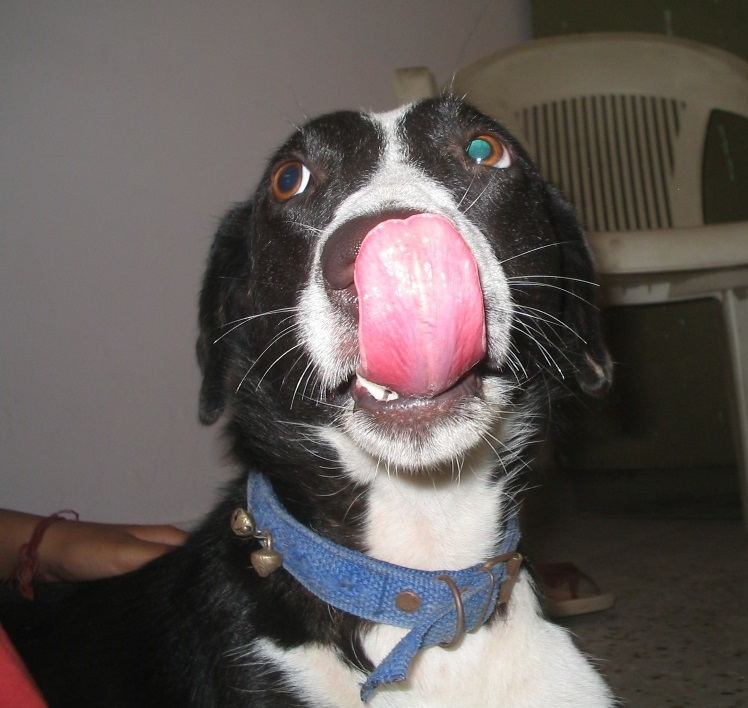
A dog displaying the lip/nose licking behavior.

Calming signals is a term conceived by Norwegian dog trainer and canine ethologist Turid Rugaas to describe the patterns of behavior in environments that cause heightened stress and when conveying their desires or intentions. The term has been used interchangeably with "appeasement signals." Calming signals, or appeasement signals, are communicative cues used by dogs to de-escalate aggressive encounters or to prevent the development of aggressive encounters completely. Calming signals are performed by one dog (the sender) and directed towards one or more individual(s) (the recipient(s)), which could be dogs or individuals of other species, such as humans. When calming signals are ignored, a dog may display warning signals of aggression, and this has the potential to escalate to outright conflict between individuals.

The domestication of dogs by humans has significantly altered the behavioral patterns observed in ancestral species, such as the wolf (C. lupis). Dogs have developed changes in body language, as well as changes in auditory and olfactory displays over the course of some 30,000 years, and many of these modified behavioral patterns, or calming signals, can differ in meaning depending on the intended signal receiver's species. Calming signals can be released by an individual voluntarily, or they can be an involuntary response to environmental stimuli as a result of stress-induced changes to body chemistry, such as the release of an odor from the body when anxious.

== History ==
In the past, studies on social behavior in wolves have been used to provide insight on social behavior patterns in domesticated dogs. Although the domesticated dog (C. familiaris) share a common ancestor with the wolves and may present certain similarities, distinct differences in morphology and in the environment in which the two species evolved can cause the transpiration of inaccurate conclusions about communication behavior patterns in domesticated dogs when applying knowledge gained by the study of wolves. Thus, the grouping of ancestral and descendant species is not found to be an appropriate method for studying calming signals in domesticated species of dogs.

The threshold for aggressive behavior in domestic dogs varies from that of wolves. Most domestic dog breeds are less likely to engage in aggressive behavior than their ancestral counterparts, and are therefore more likely to display calming signals to defuse conflict. In dog breeds that differ greatly from wolf morphology, like pugs, some visual signals will be absent or highly modified as they no longer have the physical capacity or means to convey these signals. Neoteny can also account for the loss of certain visual signals in domestic dogs and the retention of novel signals over subsequent generations.

== Types of Calming Signals ==
Dogs use visual, auditory, and olfactory indicators to communicate with both conspecifics and other species, such as humans. The majority and most well-studied calming signals are visual, and are sometimes accompanied by auditory cues (i.e. a sharp whine accompanying a yawn).

=== Examples of Visual Calming Signals ===
Examples of behaviors classified as calming signals:

- Head turning
- Softening of the eyes
- Turning away
- Lip and/or nose licking
- Freezing of the body
- Slow body movements
- Displaying a play bow
- Sitting
- Lying down
- Yawning
- Sniffing the ground
- Walking in a curve
- Wagging the tail in a low position
- Reducing body size
- Licking the recipient's mouth
- Blinking
- Smacking of the lips
- Lifting a paw

The behavioral patterns listed above have the potential to be used as calming signals, but are only classified as such in the appropriate context. For example, a dog lying down when resting would not be considered a calming signal, but a dog lying down when approached by another dog would be considered a calming signal. Thus, calming signals are context-dependent behavioral responses to a dog's environment.

Not all calming signals have the same efficacy in de-escalating aggressive encounters or conveying a dog's intention and dogs preferentially display certain calming signals over others depending on external factors such as distance between the sender and the recipient of the signal, and familiarity of the recipient to the sender. A dog is most likely to display a calming signal when it is directly interacting with another dog and when the dogs are separated by a small distance. Lip-licking is a calming signal whose use is noted to increase in frequency as the distance between the sender and the recipient decreases. However, sniffing the ground and yawning, which are both considered calming signals, are most often displayed when the distance between the sender and the recipient increases. Calming signals that are most commonly displayed by dogs overall are freezing, licking of the nose, and turning of the body away from the source of the escalation (i.e. a dog baring its teeth or growling).

== Dog-Human Interactions ==
Domestic dogs display interspecific signaling, specifically towards humans. Because domestic dogs co-inhabit the same environment as their owners/handlers, humans are their principle social partners, and there is a great level of interaction between the two. Licking of the lips and looking away are calming signal-categorized behaviors that are used by dogs in both conspecific and heterospecific interactions, and in both instances are thought to be used to appease the recipient. Lip licking is also used as a greeting behavior to establish a peaceful basis for future interactions.

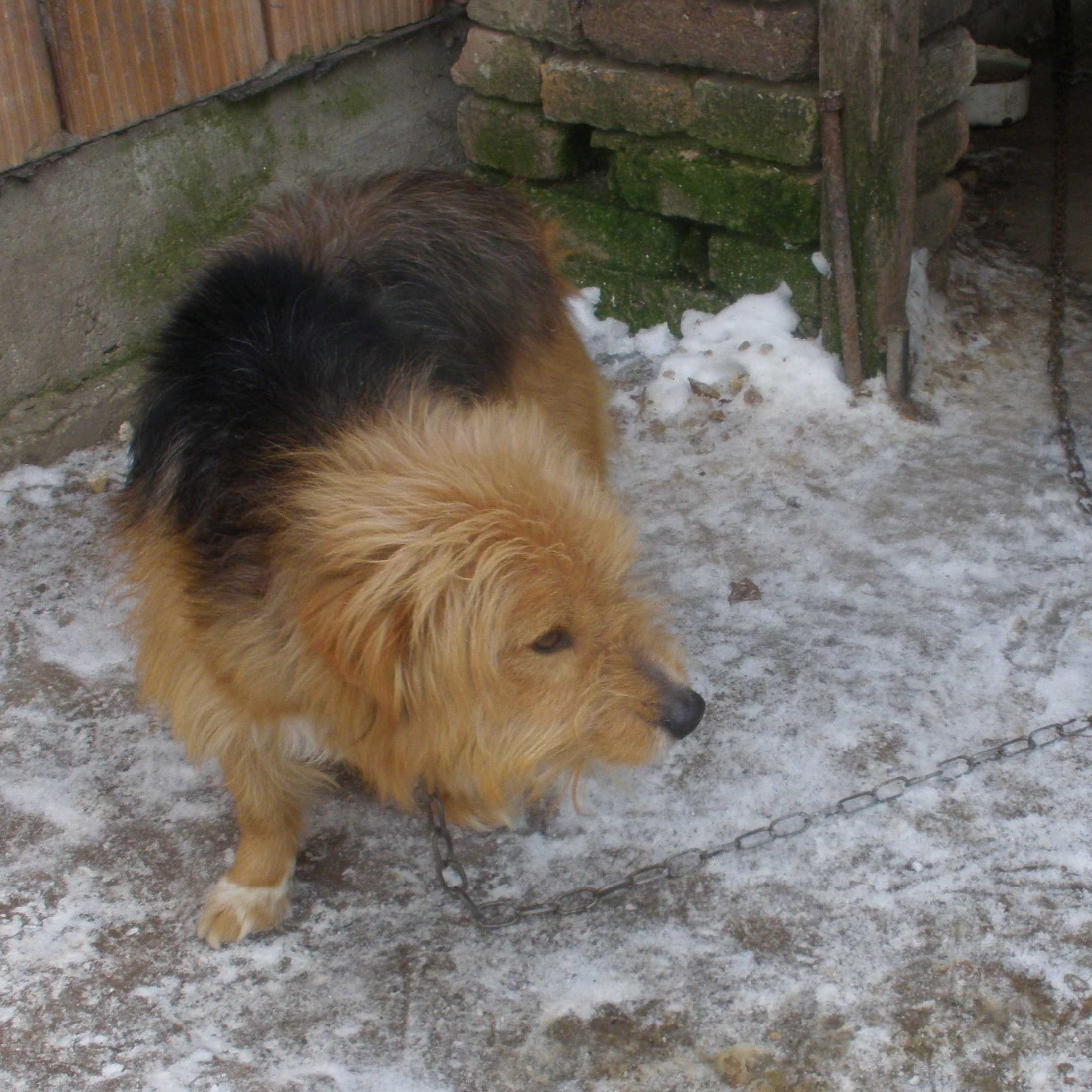
Turning the head aside,
looking away.

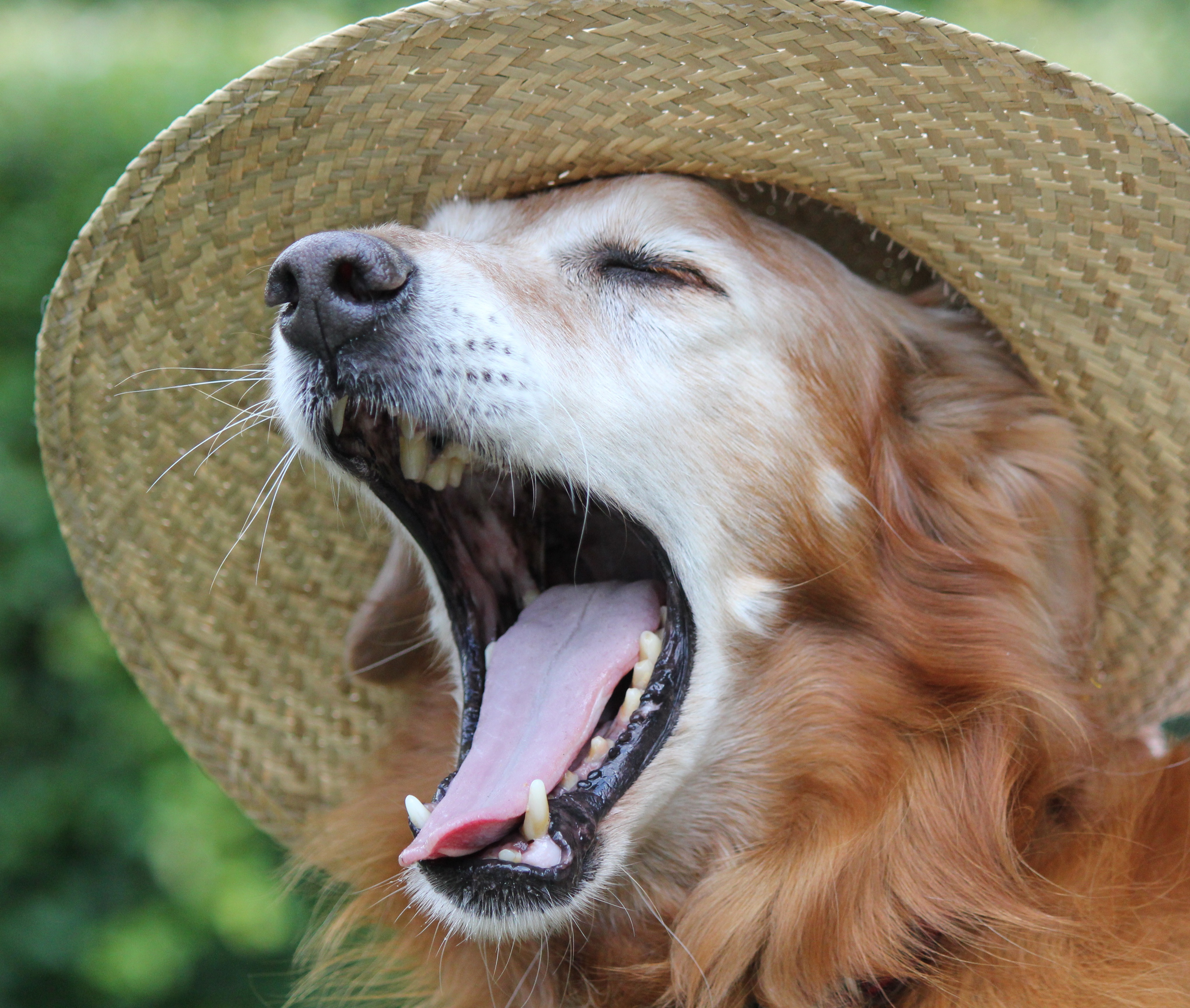
Yawning during the sensation
of an unnatural touch.

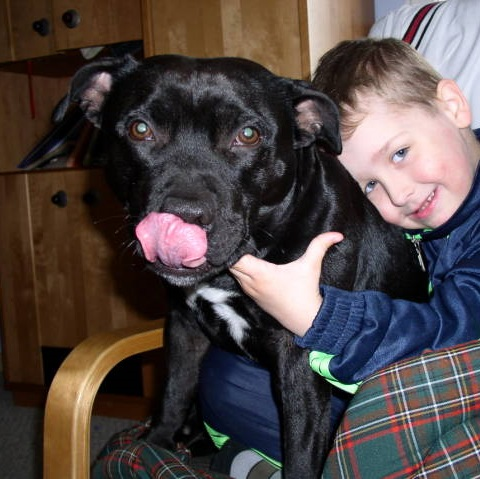
Licking the nose during an unwelcome embrace.

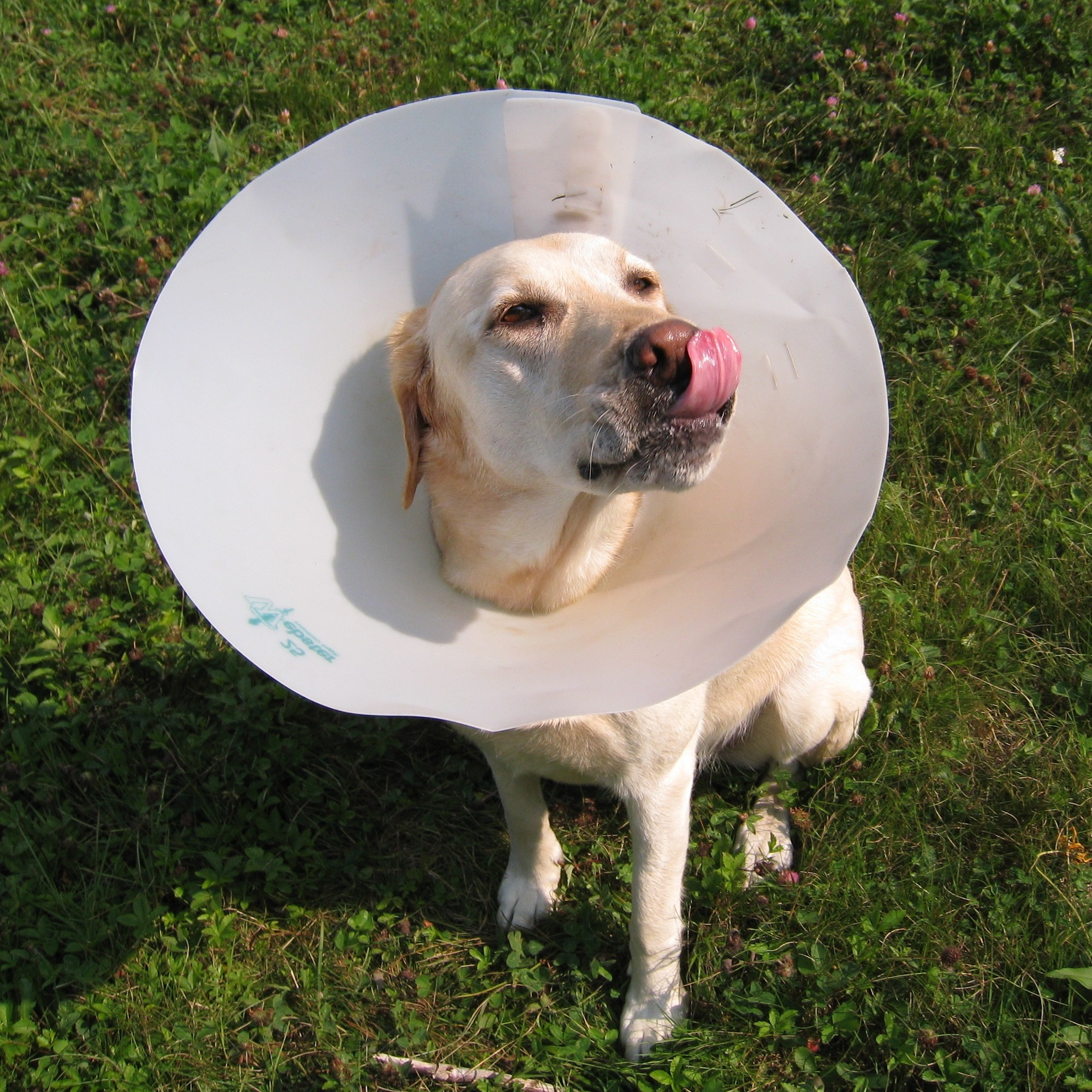
Licking the nose wearing an Elizabethan collar.

Understanding canine calming signals is crucial to experiencing positive interactions with dogs. Children under the age of six are least likely to correctly interpret auditory and visual calming signals displayed by dogs and, in the US, younger children have a greater probability of becoming victims of a dog attack. In cases where children cannot appropriately interpret and respond to calming signals, the dog-human interaction is likely to escalate, and the dog may exhibit aggressive behaviors, such as biting. Hugging can feel confusing and threatening to dogs. Therefore it is a common cause of dog bites in the face of young children.

== Conspecific Interactions ==
Calming signals are often used by dogs post-conflict to diffuse aggressive behaviors and to regain a peaceful social environment. Dogs have evolved peacemaking social mechanisms to alleviate, prevent, or resolve conflicts. Some of these behavior mechanisms are calming signals. Social groups of dogs display two types of post-conflict calming signal behavior patterns: the two opponents of the conflict display the calming signals (reconciliation), or between a third-party member of the social group and one opponent (third-party initiated post-conflict affiliation).

Familiarity and distance between two individuals affects the frequency of use of calming signals and the types of calming signals used. Calming signals are used between dogs to prevent the escalation of an agonistic encounter. Intraspecific calming signals can be voluntary, such as licking the lips, or involuntary, such as the release of odors from glands during high-stress interactions. In both cases, the recipient receives the signal, understands its meaning, and acts on this information, often taking action to mitigate the stressful environment by changing their body language or demeanor.

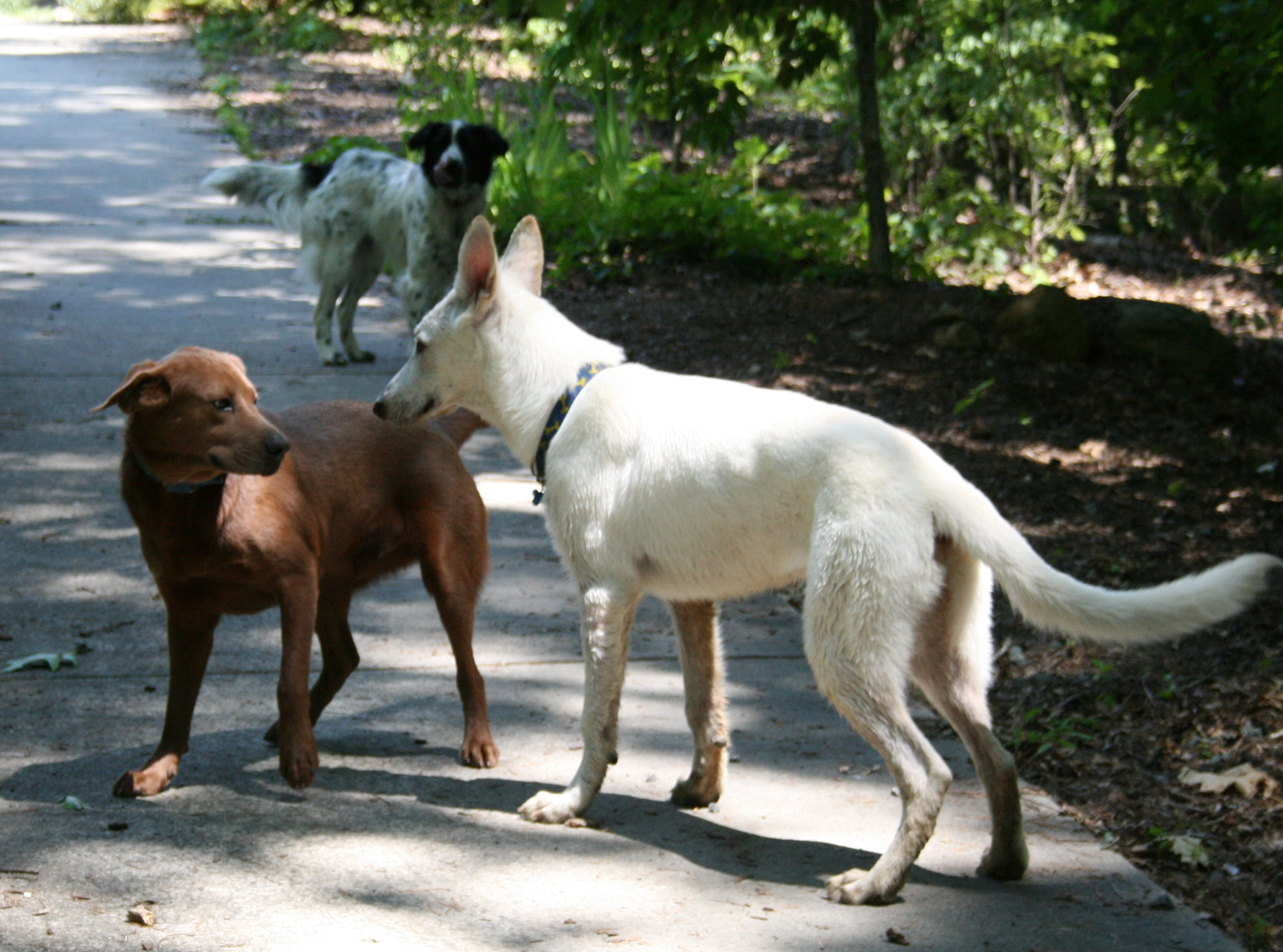
Brown dog: Softening eyes, ears back, reducing body size, lifting a paw.

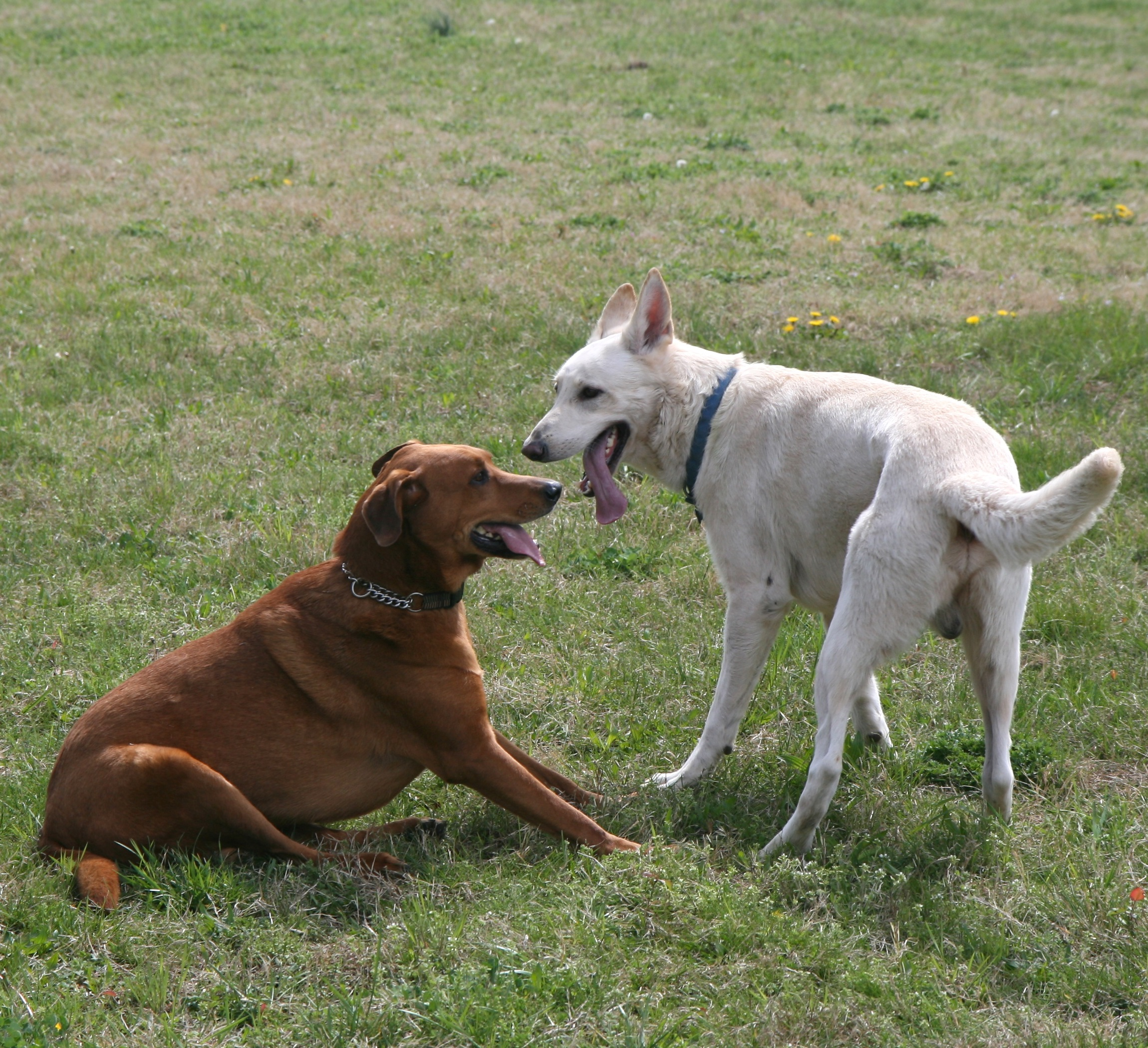
Brown dog:
Ears back, sitting.

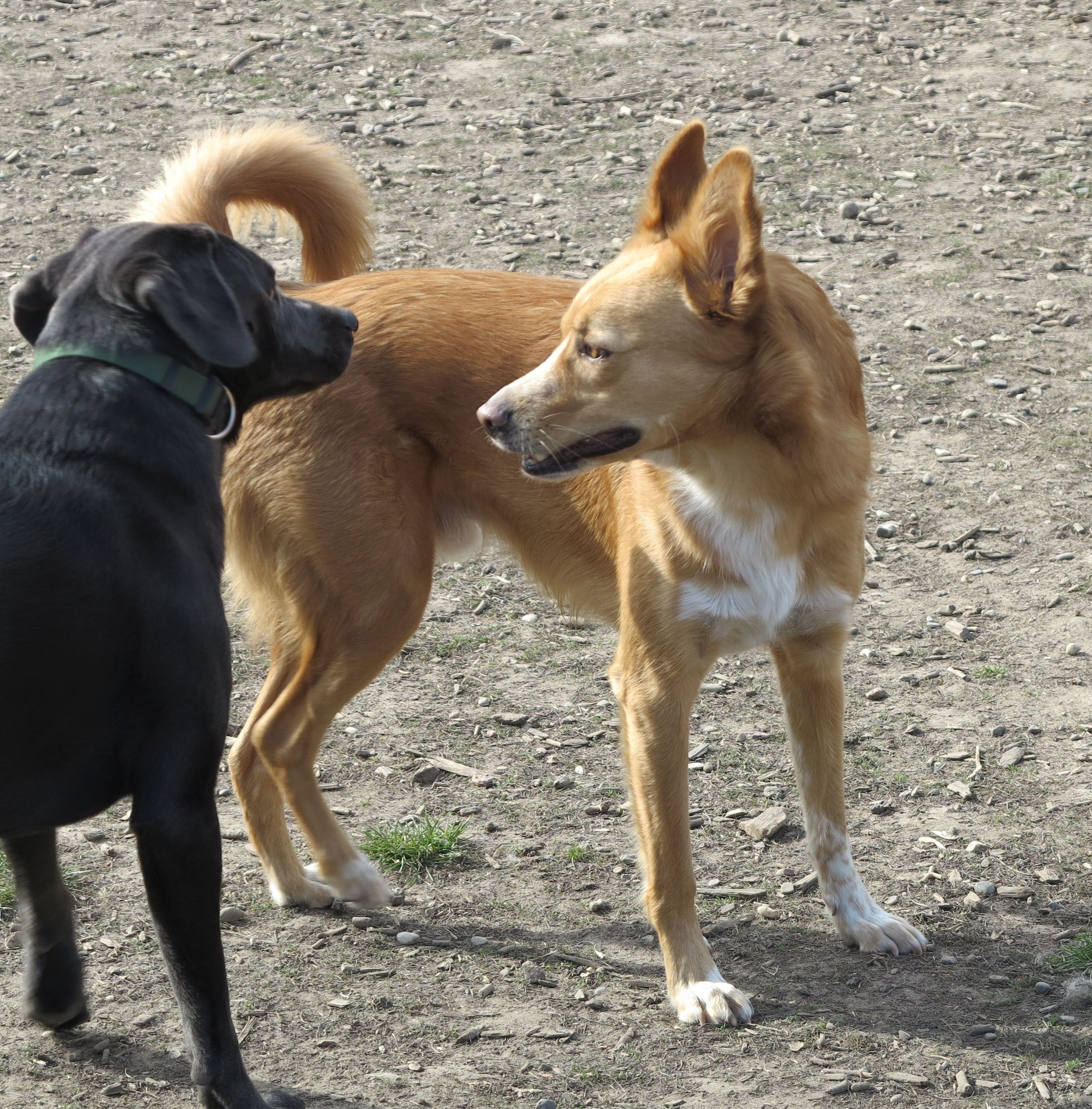
Golden dog:
freezing, showing his side.

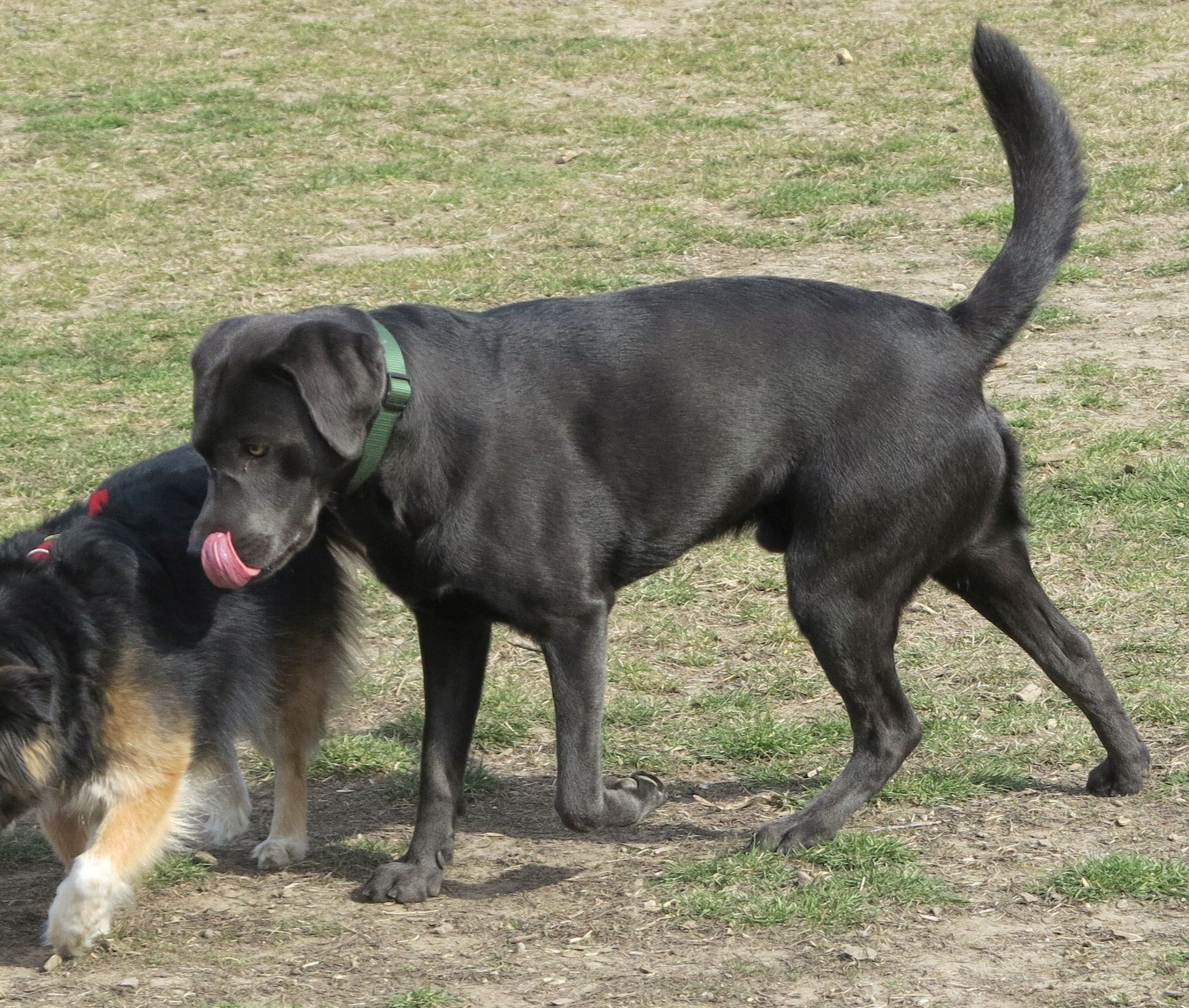
Dominant male shows peaceful intentions by licking his nose.

Calming signals are not displayed in intraspecific interactions when the level of aggression or threat exceeds the aggression threshold of the sender. In these cases, dogs are more likely to rely on submissive behaviors than calming signals. Calming signals are only useful to a dog when there is a great enough probability that the direction of the encounter can be changed to de-escalate aggression.
