= Webfishing =

2024 video game

- Developer: lamedeveloper
- Publisher: lamedeveloper
- Composers: lamedeveloper; Floombo
- Engine: Godot
- Platform: Microsoft Windows
- Release: October 12, 2024
- Genre: Fishing game
- Modes: Single-player, multiplayer

Webfishing (stylized in all caps as WEBFISHING) is an independent social fishing video game created by lamedeveloper. Originally released on itch.io in 2022, the game was remade for its Steam release on October 12, 2024. The game is described as a "multiplayer chatroom-focused fishing game" by its developer.

In Webfishing, players control an anthropomorphic animal avatar in a 3D world to catch different types of fish. Catching fish earns the player cash, either by completing quests or selling the fish, which can be used to upgrade fishing gear or buy items used to customize the avatar.

The game has been favorably compared to the Animal Crossing series. By the first week of its Steam release, it had received "overwhelmingly positive" reviews.

== Development ==
Webfishing was originally developed in 8 days in 2022 as part of Goodgis' Autumn Game jam. In its original form, the game is available for free and allows for single-player gameplay and multiplayer gameplay.

== Gameplay ==
In Webfishing, players join or host small online servers of 1–12 players where they can perform various social activities, such as fishing, metal detecting, and playing guitar. The game has been described as a sandbox. Players can earn cash by selling caught fish and completing quests, which is used to buy in-game items. In-game items include player avatar customizations and equipment upgrades.

Fishing is done through a minigame that requires the player to hold down the left mouse button to reel in a catch, occasionally clicking when prompted. Players can also purchase a "fishing buddy" that will automatically catch fish over time. Caught items are not limited just to fish, as a player may catch trash or other marine animals like snails. Caught fish and items can be of different sizes, which may be rendered in-game as appearing proportionally very large compared to the player avatar.

Aside from the standard gameplay loop of fishing to complete collections, there are several secrets in the game world, including rare fish obtained through the use of special bait or during specific events. Elements of the environment allow players to launch their avatar across the game world to access higher up locations or to more quickly reach far-off sites, which has been showcased in TikTok and Twitter videos.

An in-game guitar can be purchased that emulates the playing patterns of the real-life instrument, allowing for players to pluck individual strings, play chords, or save preset chords for ease of use. External programs and user-made mods have been created to play MIDI files through the guitar.

== Reception ==
Webfishing has received "overwhelmingly positive" reviews on Steam and has been favorably received by journalists at Rock Paper Shotgun and PC Gamer. After the first week of its release, the game had received over 3,000 reviews, with 98% of them being positive, and had a peak player count of 10,000.

Ana Diaz of Polygon praised the game, calling it the "perfect game for catching up with friends" and saying it reminded her of Club Penguin.

In response to a Steam user asking for straight representation in the game, the developer included a "straight" [sic] title with description "mhm" for 9,999 in-game dollars, making it the most expensive title in the game, with the rest of the titles being 75 in-game dollars.

=== Accolades ===
Year	Ceremony	Category	Result	Ref.
2024	The Steam Awards	Sit Back and Relax	Nominated	
