= Bow-wow Battle =

Upcoming video game

- Header of the Steam page
- Developer: M.Katsu
- Engine: Godot 4
- Platform: Windows
- Release: Early access: WW: May 1, 2026 (Windows)
- Genre: Fighting
- Modes: Single player, multiplayer

Bow-wow Battle (Japanese: ワンワンバトル, Hepburn: Wanwan Batoru) is an upcoming Japanese fighting video game developed by indie game developer M.Katsu. An early access version was released on Steam on May 1, 2026.

== Gameplay ==
Bow-wow Battle is a fighting game where the player plays as a dog and battles by barking into the microphone to push a tug of war-like gauge, which is based on the loudness and frequency of the barking.

There are multiple modes, including an online multiplayer mode, a story mode called "Dog Road" where the player fights eight different dogs, such as a puppy in a park and a legendary dog, and becomes the "Dog Path Champion". There is also a survival mode called "Crab Survival", in which the player blows away the crabs attacking with five types of items being dropped to help the player. The game also features an in-game currency called WP (Wan Points) gained from winning battles and completing daily challenges, which is automatically generated each day. The in-game currency can be used to buy dog breeds. He also added a feature, currently in beta, where the player can control a cursor by barking at the microphone with one bark to "confirm", two barks to move the cursor, and three barks to cancel.

The developer plans to add dog breeds, including pugs, huskies, and dobermanns, as well as adding a ranking system consisting of six levels ranging from "puppy" to "god dog".

== Development and release ==
It was developed by indie game developer M.Katsu. The developer said that the idea of the game came after seeing two dogs barking at each other in a park. He coded the game on Godot 4. The tug of war system of the game was based on another game he is making as a hobby, where the player presses a button to push the gauge. He incorporates the mechanics but changes the button pressing to barking. He said that he does not have experience with game development and learned programming on his own. He also said that he relies on AI tools for complex coding during development. The illustrations were also generated by AI. He also said that he was having a hard time coding the speech recognition for the barking.

The game was announced on April 7, 2026. The game was released on early access on Steam for Windows on May 1, 2026. The developer plans to fully release the game around late 2026 to early 2027.

== Reception ==
By April 12, 2026, 10,000 wishlisted the game. An X post of the gaming news website 4Gamer.net had 13 million impressions after a week of release of the early access.

Hirotaka Yamaguchi of Otakuma Keizai Shimbun praised the uniqueness of the game, adding that it is "visually appealing".
