= Action Game Maker =

Game development program

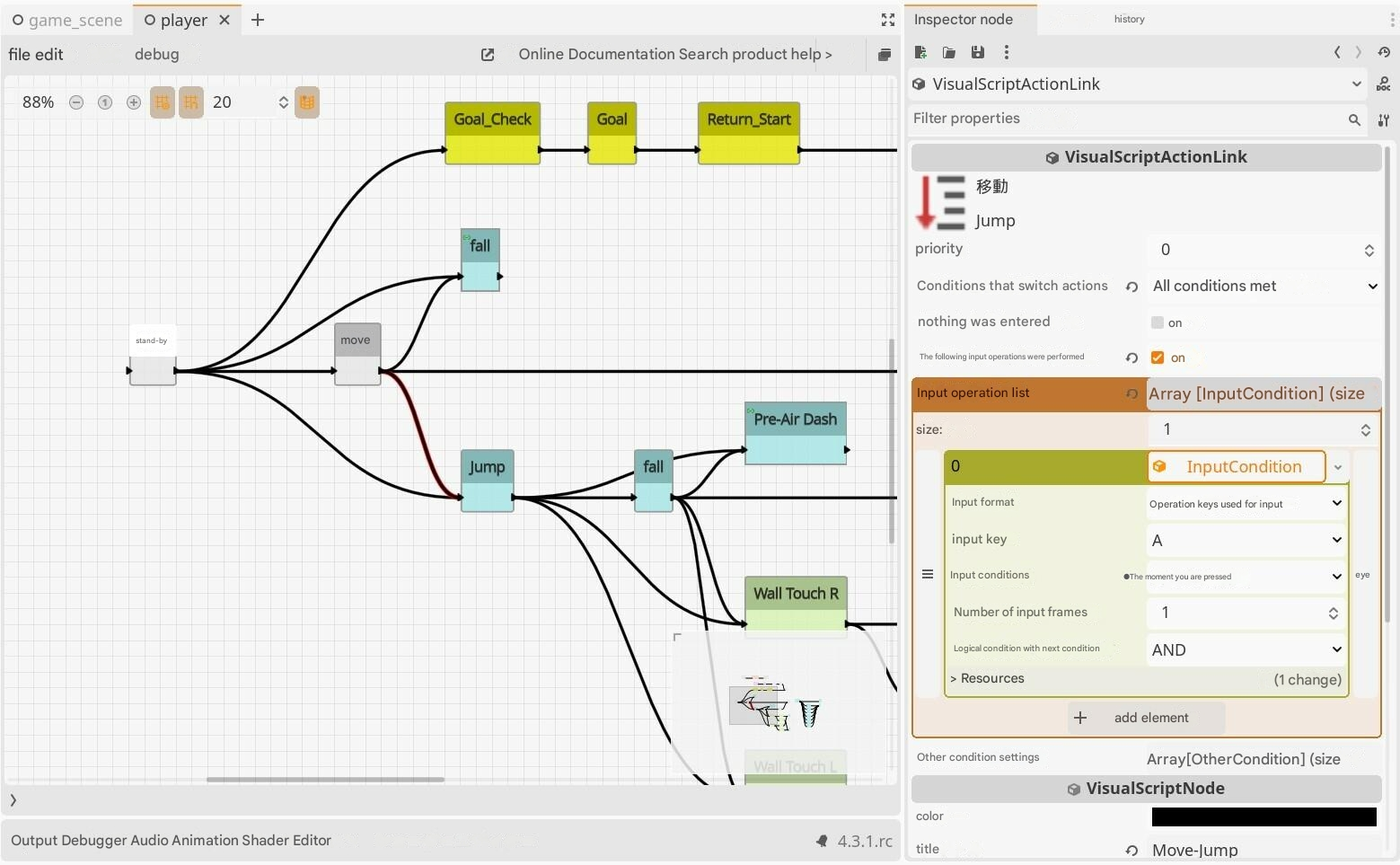
Visual scripting in Action Game Maker

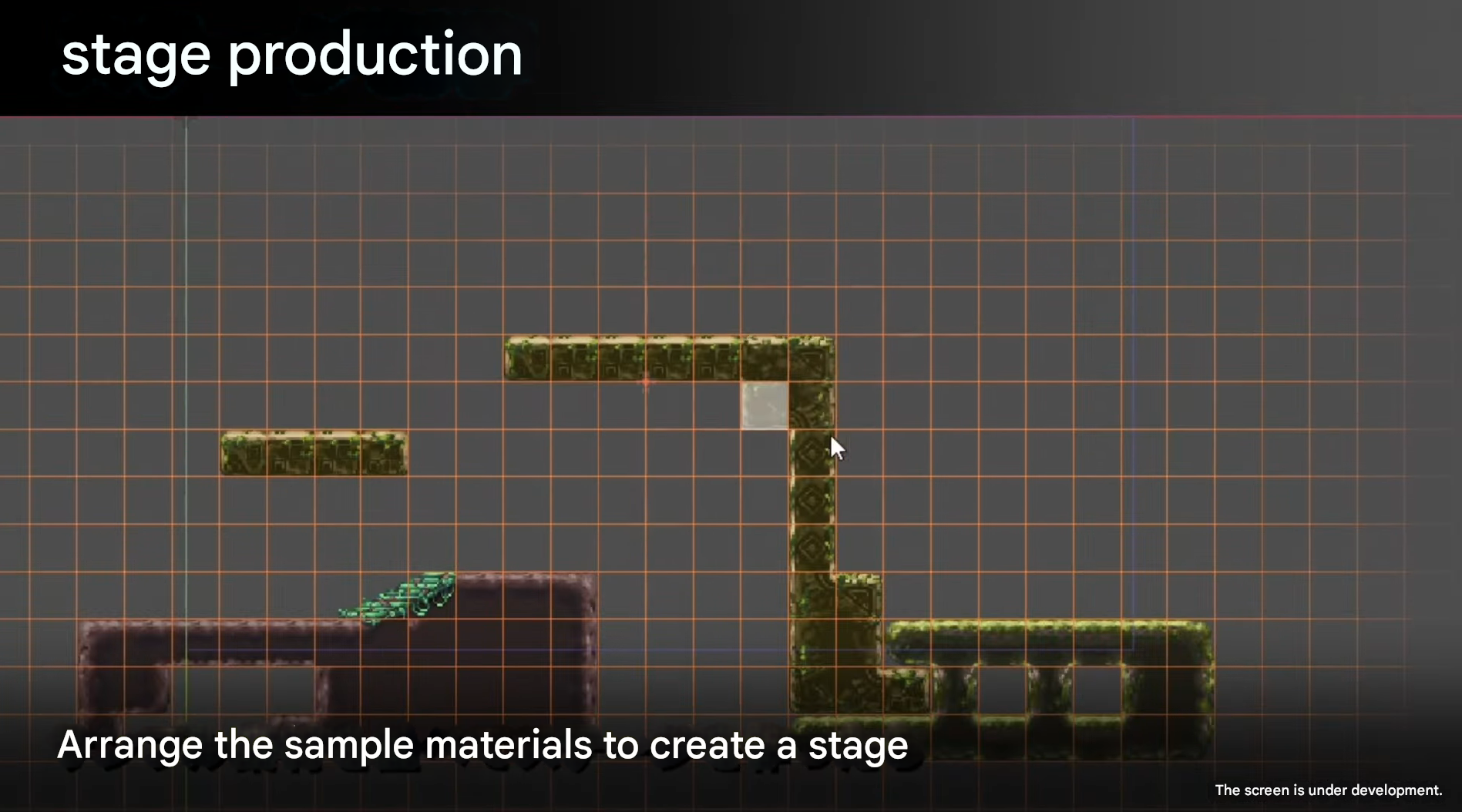
GUI in Action Game Maker

Action Game Maker is a 2D game development platform made by Gotcha Gotcha Games. It belongs to the RPG Maker series, a series of programs for developing role-playing video games (RPG's) with genre-driven varieties and machinima capabilities.

== Release Details ==
Action Game Maker was released on Steam on June 16, 2025 for Windows. It was priced at $99.99.

== Features ==
Action Game Maker uses the open-source game engine Godot. It uses a map based layout to connect "Nodes" to make games. Some scripting features are available. Action Game Maker also includes a library of pre-made assets, such as character sprites, background templates, music, and sound effects. The software has had some errors, like clunky animation systems and crashes.

The engine is built on the scripting framework of Pixel Game Maker MV and incorporates core functionality from the Godot game engine. Features such as text and gauge displays are managed through Godot’s systems, with additional tools to support both visual scripting and GDScript, giving developers the option to work through either visual- or code-based workflows.
