= Thor Vector Graphics =

Open-source C++ vector graphics engine

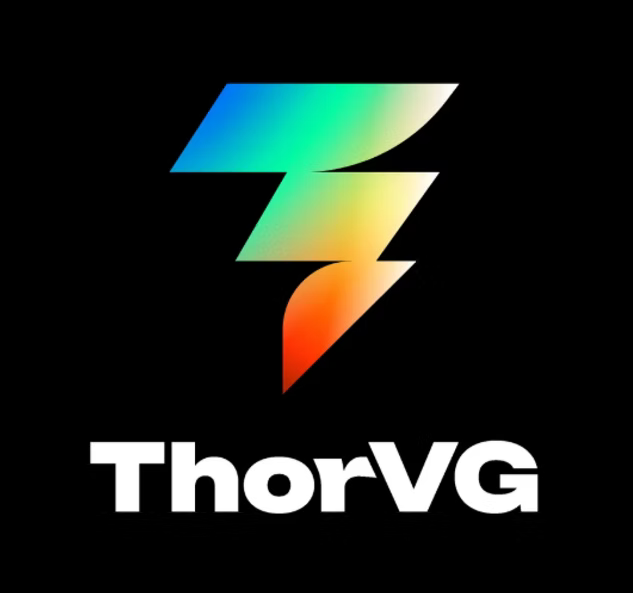
- Other names: ThorVG
- Original author: Hermet Park
- Release: 1 May 2021
- Stable release: 1.1 / 23 July 2026
- Written in: C++
- Operating system: Cross-platform
- Size: 170 kb (minimum size)
- Type: Graphics library
- License: MIT
- Website: www.thorvg.org
- Repository: github.com/thorvg/thorvg

Thor Vector Graphics (commonly abbreviated as ThorVG) is an open-source vector graphics rendering library written in C++. It supports SVG and Lottie (file format) rendering across CPU and GPU backends and is designed for portable deployment across desktop, embedded, mobile, and web platforms.

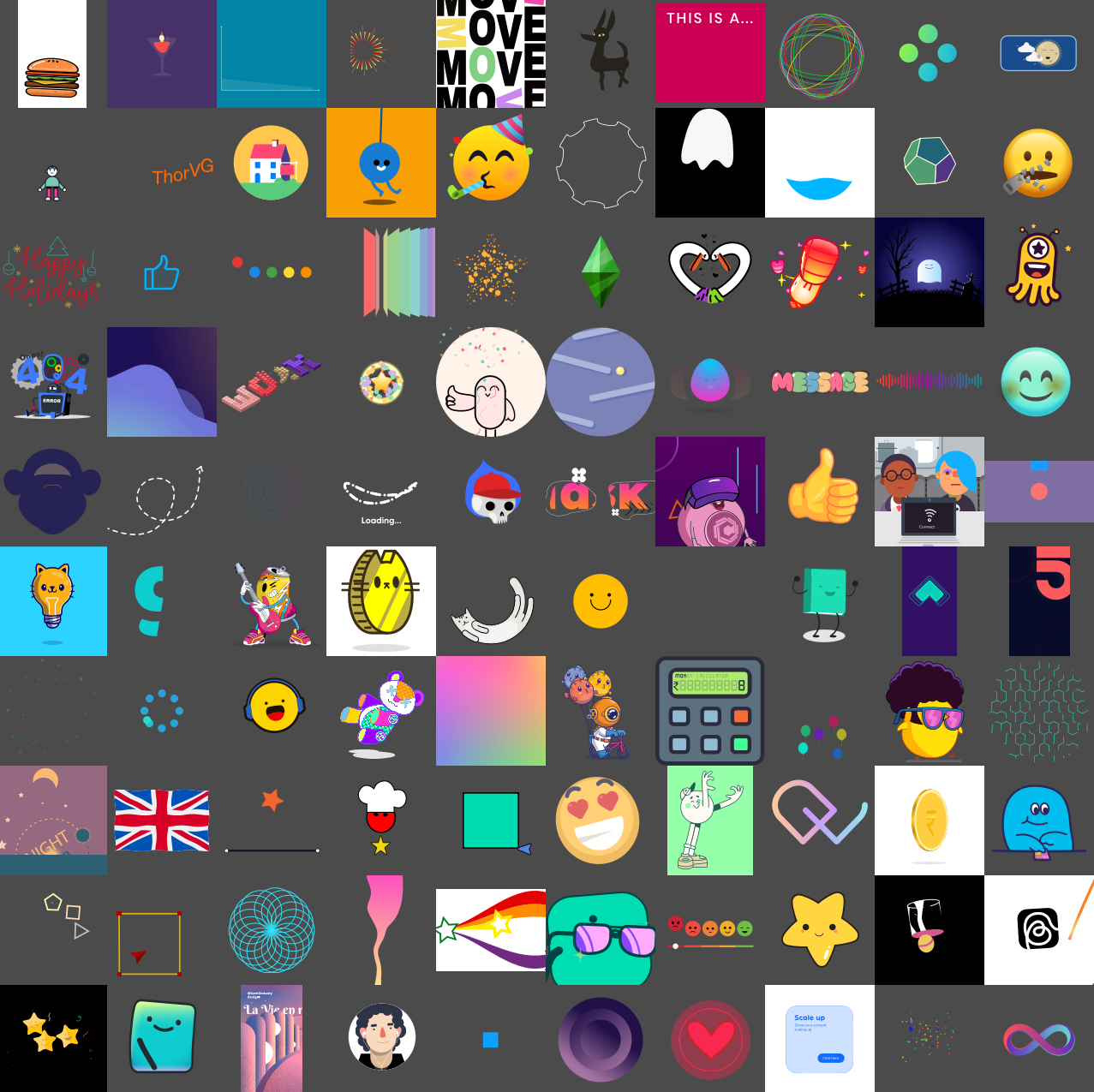
Lottie animation rendered by ThorVG

== ThorVG Adoption ==
ThorVG has been adopted by a number of open-source and commercial software projects, including the following:

- Blender (software)
- Camtasia
- Canva iOS
- dotlottie Player
- Espressif ESP-IDF
- Godot (game engine)
- LottieCreator
- LVGL
- MorphOS
- OpenVela
- SEGGER emWin
- Tizen

== History ==
- 2020 – ThorVG was initially developed by Hermet Park and released publicly in its early form.
- 2021 – With contributions from Samsung Electronics, an initial stable version was completed and integrated into the Tizen platform. In the same year, the Godot (game engine) also adopted ThorVG for vector asset rendering.
- 2022 – ThorVG's official logo was introduced, designed by Peter Vullings.
- 2023 – Support for the Lottie (file format) was added with the involvement of LottieFiles in the development. Additionally, the LVGL framework integrated ThorVG for vector rendering of UI components.
- 2024 – WebGL and WebGPU render backends were introduced. The dotLottie project adopted ThorVG as its core engine, and LottieFiles became an official sponsor of ThorVG.
- 2025 – The Lottie Creator project integrated ThorVG as its vector graphics output engine. ThorVG was also adopted as an official component in the ESP-IoT-Solution platform. In the same year, members of the Blender (software) development community discussed the potential use of ThorVG within Blender's rendering infrastructure and ThorVG has been integrated into it as a third-party library.
- 2026 - ThorVG version 1.0 was officially released, with official support for WebCanvas introduced.
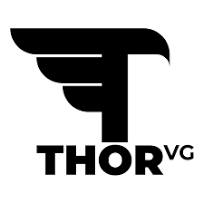
  The first version of ThorVG (2022)

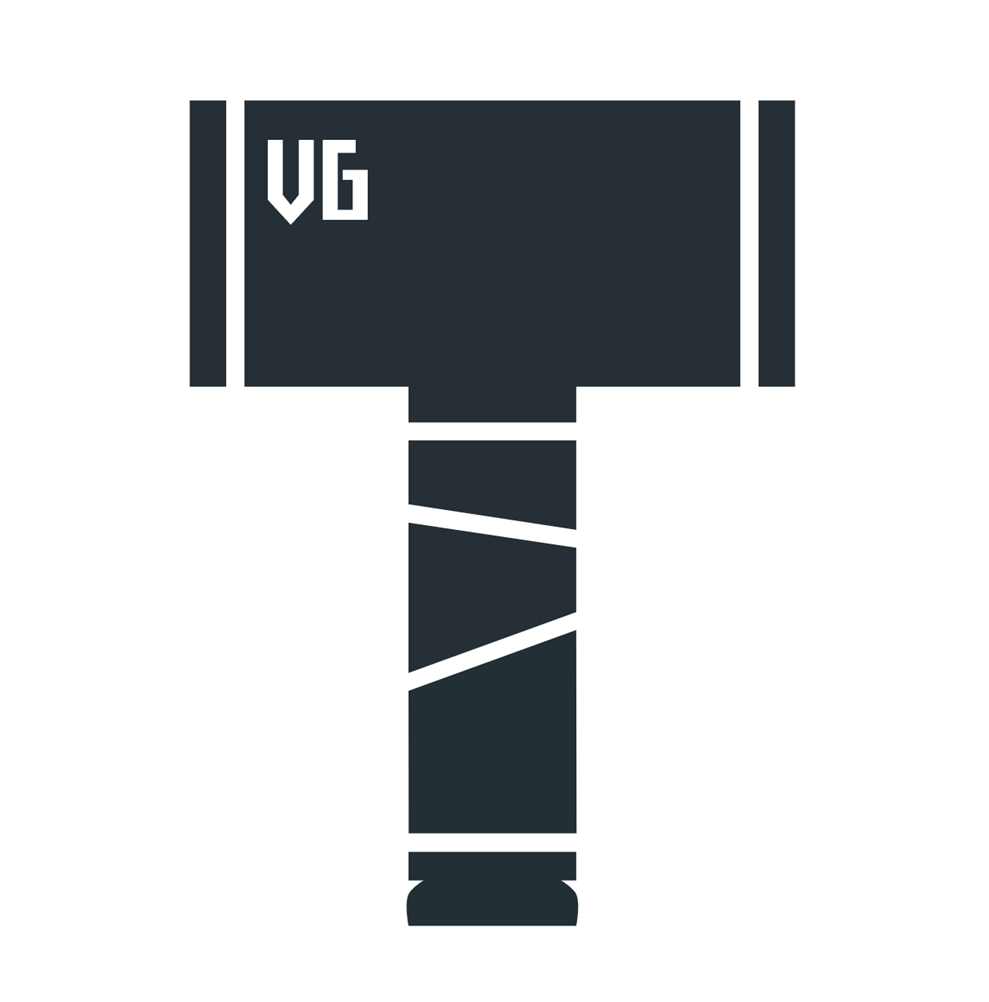
ThorVG Initial Prototype (2020)

== Reception ==
ThorVG has been discussed within the open-source and embedded graphics communities for its lightweight design and cross-platform rendering capabilities. Independent technical discussions and evaluations have appeared in developer forums and engineering publications, including articles by third-party engineering teams.

== See also ==
- Lottie (file format)
- SVG
- Vector graphics
- WebGL
- WebGPU
