= Lucid Blocks =

2026 Surreal survival sandbox indie game

- Developer: Lucy B. Locks
- Publisher: Lucy B. Locks
- Engine: Godot
- Platform: Windows
- Release: March 13, 2026
- Genres: Sandbox, survival
- Mode: Single-player

Lucid Blocks is a surrealistic and psychedelic sandbox survival video game. The game is known for its surrealistic, lucid dream-like aesthetic, with gameplay resembling Minecraft, and unique approach to its genre's standards. It was released on March 13, 2026, on Steam.

== Gameplay ==
The player explores infinite liminal procedurally generated 3D voxel environments, collecting resources, fighting monsters and taming creatures. One of the major mechanics is "apotheosis" – a crafting system which allows the player to combine materials in a certain order to get a new item or tool. Many classical video game concepts are referred to in Lucid Blocks by different names; examples include hostile enemies being referred to as "Vermins", game sessions being named "Qualia", equipment being referred as "Paraphernalia". In "Firmament", the players can share their worlds (Qualias), saving and loading them to Steam workshop. "The Tome" located in player's inventory, allows user to draw inside it with different colours and brushes, without affecting the gameplay in any way. The game also supports modding with major changes to the gameplay, but it is not yet implemented into the Steam workshop.

By using Apotheosis and killing Vermins, the player earns XP, after collecting a sufficient amount of which the player will "bloom", allowing them to choose between increasing certain stats or acquiring different unique items such as a pendant leading to a Tiamana Leyline, or a portal to a "Clonaqualia" – the player's personal dimension with nothing inside.

Player using apotheosis in one of the locations of the game by combining materials in their inventory

== Plot ==
The game contains significant motifs from Christianity, presumably taking place in purgatory, with the protagonist's mind being transported into a "withering carcass" of a "bloated, festering limbo", where their soul will remain for eternity, and the only exit to heaven is through oblivion. To progress through the story, the player needs to fill the "Rosary" by finding and beating Tiamana leylines, that will eventually lead to fighting the Final Boss, beating which ends the game.

== Development ==
Author of Lucid Blocks, who uses the name Lucy B. Locks, is a student at the Massachusetts Institute of Technology, who focuses on software that helps people understand their physical and mental health. The game originally started as a test project for Godot, but evolved into its own unique idea. The developer describes the gameplay as "an entirely new way to experience your subconscious". Many sprites for items are derived from photos of junk around the developer's house and items from a dollar store; for example, a clownfish plush toy is used when the player holds any food items in their hands.

== Reception ==
Lucid Blocks received "overwhelmingly positive" reviews on Steam. A reviewer for the Russian website VGTimes said that the game contains elements of horror. The game has been widely compared to Minecraft, as described by PC Gamer - "what if Minecraft except extremely odd, with an art style mixing 'liminal spaces' with dreamlike misty voxel worlds". The mechanic of Apotheosis was described as random, giving "nonsensical" combos by combining completely unrelated materials, but at the same time "warped and enchanting", providing a certain surprise element.
