= The Case of the Golden Idol =

2022 video game

- Developer: Color Gray Games
- Publisher: Playstack
- Designers: Andrejs Kļaviņš; Ernests Kļaviņš
- Programmer: Andrejs Kļaviņš
- Artist: Ernests Kļaviņš
- Composer: Kyle Misko
- Engine: Godot (Note: Redux update used Unity)
- Platforms: macOS; Windows; Nintendo Switch; Android; iOS; Xbox One; Xbox Series X/S; PlayStation 5
- Release: 13 October 2022: macOS, Windows; 13 October 2022; Nintendo Switch; 25 May 2023; Android, iOS; 11 June 2024; Xbox One, Series X/S; 8 July 2024; PS4, PS5; 29 July 2024
- Genre: Puzzle
- Mode: Single-player

The Case of the Golden Idol is a 2022 puzzle video game developed by Color Gray Games and published by Playstack. The game depicts a narrative spanning 40 years in the 18th century, in which players collect clues to piece together concepts, characters, and evidence to provide context to the story. It was originally released for PC and was ported to consoles and mobile platforms in 2023 and 2024.

The Case of the Golden Idol was developed by Latvian independent developers Ernests and Andrejs Kļaviņš, who aimed to create a detective game influenced by the visual presentation of 1990s adventure games. The Case of the Golden Idol was similarly inspired by the design of the 2018 game Return of the Obra Dinn by Lucas Pope, with the game receiving similar comparisons from reviewers.

The Case of the Golden Idol received praise for its use of deduction to present its narrative and distinctive visual presentation, and received awards as one of the best games of 2022. Two expansions to the game, The Spider of Lanka and The Lemurian Vampire, were released as downloadable content in 2023. The Case of the Golden Idol Redux, released as a free update in October 2024, provides several quality of life updates to the game. A sequel, The Rise of the Golden Idol, released in 2024.

== Gameplay ==
A screenshot of The Case of the Golden Idol, depicting the 'Thinking' mode of gameplay

The Case of the Golden Idol is a detective based puzzle game in which the player connects together the details of the narrative from eleven cases, placing the player at or shortly after where a central character in the narrative has met their death. Each level represents a frozen point in time, represented by the looped animation of its characters. Players resolve chapters through two modes of gameplay, with the overarching objective to correctly identify the details of the events in the chapter.

In 'Exploring' mode, the game resembles a point-and-click adventure game where an environment is presented frozen at a point in time. Players are able to investigate the scene by clicking on characters, objects, or documents to collect key words of interest, such as names, places, verbs, and items, that are collected in the bottom of the screen. While the events on screen are frozen in time, players are freely able to navigate between rooms, open the contents of containers, and see what items and documents a character has on their person, as well as any words that they have said.

In 'Thinking' mode, words of interest are used to piece together a narrative of what has occurred, through filling in blank slots against an incomplete description of events and characters. Parts of the 'Thinking' mode will differ depending on the chapter, in some cases requiring players to identify full names of characters, and in others specifying situational characteristics such as the titles of Brotherhood members, or the occupants of certain rooms. To assist the player, slots are completed in segments, with the player being notified when the words in that segment are either entirely correct, in which case the segment is locked in, or when the segment has more or less than two incorrect words allocated.

== Plot ==
The Case of the Golden Idol tells the story of the titular Golden Idol, a relic with supernatural powers, as it travels over time through the hands of the Cloudsley family to the criminal underworld, esoteric secret societies, and the political and aristocratic class. The game is organized into four chapters, spanning a period of fifty years.

In 1742, Albert Cloudsley acquires the Golden Idol on an expedition after pushing his partner, Dr. Oberon Geller, off a cliff. In 1786, his descendant, Sebastian Cloudsley, dies in an accident. Sebastian is a member of the Brotherhood, a secret society of the wealthy and political elite. His will passes the Idol to Willard Wright, a fellow member of the Brotherhood.

Edmund Cloudsley, the eldest son of the Cloudsley family, witnesses Willard use the Idol to spontaneously combust a servant and orders his loyal servant David Gorran to acquire it. David successfully retrieves the Idol but murders Willard. Walter Keene, a Brotherhood Steward, investigates the incident. Upon discovering Edmund's treachery, Walter unsuccessfully attempts to get Edmund poisoned. Edmund hides in his estate's cabin to experiment with the Idol's powers and discovers that the Idol can absorb and expel properties such as matter, temperature, and even age. Upon discovering Edmund's location, Walter recruits a band of thieves and storms the cabin but is caught by a rigged explosive vase.

After the incident, both Walter and David report that Edmund died in a chemical reaction triggered by the explosion. Walter, alongside a disguised David, goes back to the Brotherhood and endorses Lazarus Herst, a mysterious young man who helped Keene escape the authorities, to join the cult. Lazarus has possession of the Idol and uses its powers to rise up its ranks, eventually becoming the leader of the Brotherhood.

Years later, the Brotherhood, restyled as the "Order Party", becomes the dominant political movement. All party members are ranked by virtuous behavior. Using the Idol, Lazarus takes youth away from those of low rank, and bestows it upon to those of high rank. They plan to overthrow the King, who does not recognize their authority. Before they can do so, Lazarus is lured back to the Cloudsley manor after discovering the location of his past romantic interest, but is blasted and killed by a cannon. The Idol is broken from the blast.

In the epilogue, Lazarus is revealed to be Edmund after using the Idol's powers to de-age himself. Edmund convinces Walter and David to join his movement and fake his death. He planned to use the Idol to gain power and build an ideal society. Years later, the Order Party is disbanded and the defunct Idol is discarded as scrap metal.

=== The Spider of Lanka ===
Preceding the main story, The Spider of Lanka DLC is the first half of a prologue story explaining how Oberon and Albert came to possess the Idol. On the island of Lanka, Oberon and Albert execute a series of deceptions to acquire the Idol. Oberon saves the young Lemurian student Zubiri Kerra from a fight he himself orchestrates to extract details regarding the royal succession ritual, which he and Albert then leverage to sabotage the ritual, killing the island's heir apparent. Zubiri and his father, Yupik Kerra are held responsible by the Raja. In order to convince the Raja to spare his son's life, Yupik reveals the location of the Idol to him.

A few days later, Yupik meets with Oberon and shares with him too the location of the Golden Idol as thanks for saving Zubiri. This is a set-up for the Raja's guards, but Oberon evades the guards and leaves the island. The story ends with Oberon approaching Albert with a proposition to search for the Golden Idol.

=== The Lemurian Vampire ===
The Lemurian Vampire DLC completes the prologue story started by The Spider of Lanka. Following the shipwreck of the Raja's expedition for the idol, Zubiri and two other survivors arrive on Monkey Paw Island, the home of the Idol. They are welcomed in by the village on the island, and hear of a monster which terrorized the village before being banished to a tower—we later learn this so-called "tower dweller" is a voice-activated automaton employing the Idol, and is responding to villagers' incantations by draining their life.

Oberon and Albert arrive on the island. With the villagers' permission destroy the tower, exposing the tower dweller as an automaton. The Idol, however, has already been retrieved by the village councilwoman Lavu Mata, who had been using it for years to prolong her lifespan with that taken from the other villagers. Oberon seizes the Idol from Lavu and escapes the island with Albert.

In the epilogue, Zubiri replaces Lavu on the village council. Albert, feeling that Oberon is becoming too powerful, prepares to push Oberon off the cliff, leading directly into the first scene of the main story.

== Development ==
The game was developed by Latvian independent developers Ernests and Andrejs Kļaviņš, who had a decade of prior experience in the game industry. The brothers founded the studio Color Gray Games in 2021, with an objective to build prototypes for their games to see if their titles could be commercially successful. The Case of the Golden Idol was developed as the first commercial venture of the studio, and scouted for publication by publisher Playstack in late 2021.

The developers were inspired to work on the game by the genre of deduction games pioneered by The Return of the Obra Dinn and Her Story, observing a lack of similar games in the market. In response, they aimed to create an analytical detective game based on a realistically designed world. The developers pursued a visual design inspired by the pixel art of classic point-and-click adventure games of the 1990s, with Andrejs Kļaviņš stating "we want(ed) to elicit a bit of nostalgia in those who grew up playing adventure games, but put a new spin on it." Citing the desire to take a new approach, the developers pursued the 18th century as a setting due to the overuse of the 19th century, and were inspired by the art of Gustave Doré and William Hogarth as aesthetic references when illustrating the art of the game. The developers originally created the game using the Godot engine and produced its art using Aseprite. The game's soundtrack was written by Ukrainian composer Kyle Misko, who aimed to use orchestral elements to create a soundtrack evocative of the eighteenth century whilst integrating ambient and new age elements. For the downloadable content expansions, Misko used world instruments consummate with their new settings, such as Asian percussion and instruments for The Spider of Lanka and tribal elements for The Lemurian Vampire.

A demo of the game was released on Steam on 25 August 2022, in line with the Steam Next Fest event in October 2022, an event that showcases upcoming games on the platform. The full version of the game was released on 13 October 2022 for Windows and macOS, and released for the Nintendo Switch on 25 May 2023. It was also released by Netflix Games for Android and iOS on 11 June 2024. Ports for Xbox One and Xbox Series X/S were released on 8 July 2024, with versions for PlayStation 4 and PlayStation 5 releasing three weeks later on 29 July.

A sequel, The Rise of the Golden Idol, was announced at The Game Awards 2023, and released on 12 November 2024, for Windows, macOS, Nintendo Switch, PlayStation 4, PlayStation 5, Xbox Series X/S and mobile devices through Netflix. The game takes place in the 1970s in continuity with the first game.

=== Downloadable content ===
Additional cases for The Case of the Golden Idol were released as downloadable content (DLC) under the name Golden Idol Mysteries. The first release, The Spider of Lanka, was released in May 2023, adding three new cases to the game. Set before the events of the main game, The Spider of Lanka involves the travels of Albert Cloudsley and Oberon Geller to the Kingdom of Lanka. The second DLC, The Lemurian Vampire, was released in August 2023. Providing a further three cases set on Monkey Paw Island, The Lemurian Vampire follows the events of The Spider of Lanka and connects the events of the DLC to the main game, providing the origin story of the Golden Idol and the involvement of the Cloudsley family.

=== Redux ===
The Case of the Golden Idol Redux was released on 10 October 2024. This free update introduces several quality-of-life features, including a new hint system, user interface improvements (with a focus on the Steam Deck), and additional localization options. The game was also ported from the Godot engine to Unity.

== Reception ==
Reception

Aggregate score
Aggregator	Score
Metacritic	(PC) 84/100 (NS) 93/100

Review scores
Publication	Score
Adventure Gamers	3/5
Edge	8/10
Eurogamer	Recommended
Nintendo World Report	9.5/10
PC Gamer (US)	89%
The Guardian	5/5

The PC version of The Case of the Golden Idol received "generally positive" reviews, while the Switch version received "universal acclaim", according to review aggregator Metacritic. The game appeared on several year-end lists as one of the best games of 2022. IGN nominated the game as one of the best puzzle games of 2022 on the basis of its "refreshing take" on the murder mystery genre and gameplay. PC Gamer awarded the game as having the best story of the year, praising the "deep and fascinating" narrative surrounding the idol, its history and powers, and the intertwined lives of the game's characters. Polygon, rating the game as one of the best of 2022, stated the game "expertly supports you through the trial and error of detective work" and contained an "excellent payoff" and "epilogue". Simon Parkin of The New Yorker also cited the game as one of the best of the year, describing it as a "riveting detective game" and a "sophisticated, Sherlockian story about wealth and greed, delivered in a way that rewards close attention."

Critics praised the innovative use of deduction to solve the puzzles in the game, with several reviewers highlighting the experience of discovering and understanding the game's clues. Writing for The Guardian, Simon Parkin praised the game's "genuinely new and inventive forms of play" and innovative puzzles. Nicole Carpenter for Polygon highlighted the game's ability to "take the time to consider each scene in depth" and "expand past its own boundaries...leaving me thinking about its clues long after I've closed the game". Edge commended the innovative use of ancillary questions across cases and the use of misdirection and red herrings.

However, some critics noted the complex and trial-and-error guesswork of the game had occasionally inconsistent execution. Chris Livingston of PC Gamer observed some cases required "occasionally brute-forcing the final few names or detail of a case" and noted some cases "didn't entirely come together". Katharine Castle of Rock Paper Shotgun similarly observed instances where the game's leaps of logic "went one step too far" and reached a resolution through guesswork instead of deduction. Similarly, Dean Waxman of Adventure Gamers critiqued the game's "extremely obscure" clues and poor distinction between essential and secondary clues.

Critics also praised the game's narrative and writing. Alexis Ong of Eurogamer praised the humour and "witty, observational writing" in the game, remarking that it also contained a "Hogarthian flavor of political and social commentary" and "cheeky digs at the upper class disconnect with the common man." Chris Livingston of PC Gamer praised the game's "elaborate and intricate" cases, and stated "solving these murders [is] not just a fantastic series of crime-scene investigations but a highly imaginative bit of storytelling." Stefano Castagnola of IGN Italy highlighted the game's originality and progression in revealing a "more intricate story than originally seemed" filled with "no shortage of interesting revalations". In contrast, Dean Waxman of Adventure Gamers found the narrative to be heavily segmented and difficult to follow, citing the "poorly fleshed out and uninteresting" character development".

Critics also noted the distinctive visual presentation of the game, with several critics praising the game's visual style as evocative of 1990s adventure games, including those from LucasArts. Edge praised the character design as "memorably drawn" and evocative of the "ugly" personal qualities of the characters. Similarly, Stefano Castagnola of IGN Italy described the "grotesque contours" of the visual presentation as "distinctive" but unlikely to appeal to all players. Dean Waxman of Adventure Gamers felt the graphics to be dated and flat, describing the character design as "bland and unappealing".

The game received positive comparisons to the 2018 adventure game Return of the Obra Dinn as a non-linear detective game. Commenting on the demo of the game, Lucas Pope, developer of Return of the Obra Dinn, also praised the game as having "fantastic art, great mysteries, and rewarding, methodical gameplay", a remark that was noted by the developers and subsequently used to promote the game. Edge noted that both games share a "grisly mise-en-scene" and "intelligent way it seeds clues everywhere, making oblique allusions to places and people". Katharine Castle of Rock Paper Shotgun noted the game was reminiscent of Return of the Obra Dinn in its "keen eye for detail and visual flourish", although observed the game "may not be quite as nuanced". William Hughes of The A.V. Club felt The Case of the Golden Idol "asks players to go far more in-depth (than Obra Dinn), sacrificing its inspiration's breadth for case-by-case depth."

=== Awards ===
Awards and nomination received by The Case of the Golden Idol
Year	Award	Category	Result	Ref
2023	New York Game Awards	Chumley's Speakeasy Award for Best Hidden Gem	Nominated	
2023	Independent Games Festival	Seumas McNally Grand Prize	Nominated	
2023	Independent Games Festival	Excellence in Design	Won	
2023	19th British Academy Games Awards	Debut Game	Nominated	
2023	Golden Joystick Awards	Best Game Expansion (The Lemurian Vampire and Spider of Lanka)	Nominated	
