= Lottie (file format) =

File format for vector graphics animations

- Filename extensions: .json, .lot
- Internet media type: video/lottie+json
- Developed by: Hernan Torrisi
- Initial release: 2015
- Type of format: Vector animation
- Extended from: JSON, Adobe After Effects
- Extended to: dotLottie
- Website: lottie.github.io

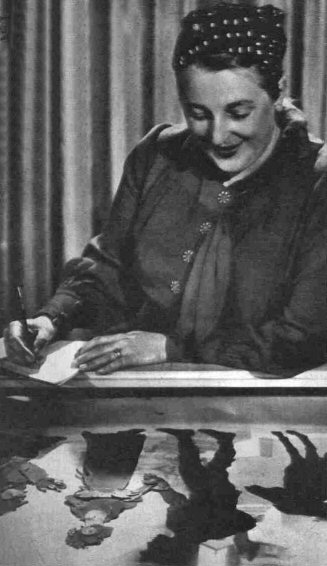
Lotte Reiniger in 1939

Lottie is a file format for vector graphics animation, and is named after Charlotte "Lotte" Reiniger, a German pioneer of silhouette animation.

== Description ==
Lottie is based in JSON but Lottie files use keys of 1–2 characters in length and are not readable by humans. It is intended as a lighter alternative to animated GIFs and APNG files for use in the web, mobile and desktop applications. Being vectorial it is independent of the device resolution. It can also include raster graphic elements. It also allows for the inclusion of interactive elements.

The different player implementations have tradeoffs between CPU, GPU and memory usage.

== History ==
2015 - Hernan Torrisi released a plugin named Bodymovin for the animation software Adobe After Effects that serialized animations as JSON to be rendered at runtime. It supported some but not all of the features of the internal format of After Effects. Additionally, Torrisi released a renderer for the format with a JavaScript-based player for modern browsers.

2017 - it was the work of engineers Brandon Withrow (iOS), Gabriel Peal (Android), and Leland Richardson (React Native) along with lead animator Salih Abdul-Karim at Airbnb that saw the creation of the first Lottie libraries to render the animations in different platforms.

Other companies have provided support for more platforms.

2018 - Microsoft and the .NET Foundation released a library for rendering Lottie on Windows.

2019 - further support for Lottie was by Qt with the release of a QML API for rendering Lottie. Later that same year, Samsung released rLottie which is a platform independent C++-based renderer for Lottie, and added Lottie support in Tizen. A Python framework to work with the format was also released this year.

2020 - dotLottie was created. This open-source file format combines multiple Lottie files and all their supporting resources into a single file.

2023 - ThorVG began to support the Lottie rendering feature.

2024 - The Lottie Animation Community was established to standardize the file format.

2024 - The npm package lottie-player, that allowed playing animations in hosting web pages, was temporarily compromised to insert code that targeted cryptocurrency holders.

== Example ==
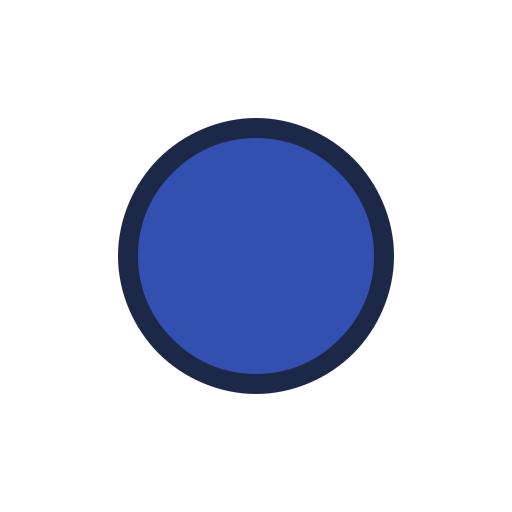

This code will produce a 512 pixel image of the above circle:

{
  "v": "5.7.1",
  "ip": 0,
  "op": 180,
  "nm": "Animation",
  "fr": 60,
  "w": 512,
  "h": 512,
  "layers": [
    {
      "ddd": 0,
      "ty": 4,
      "ind": 0,
      "st": 0,
      "ip": 0,
      "op": 180,
      "nm": "Layer",
      "ks": {
        "a": {
          "a": 0,
          "k": [256, 256]
        },
        "p": {
          "a": 0,
          "k": [256, 256]
        },
        "s": {
          "a": 0,
          "k": [256, 256]
        },
        "r": {
          "a": 0,
          "k": 0
        },
        "o": {
          "a": 0,
          "k": 100
        }
      },
      "shapes": [
        {
          "ty": "el",
          "nm": "Ellipse",
          "d": 1,
          "p": {
            "a": 0,
            "k": [256, 256]
          },
          "s": {
            "a": 0,
            "k": [256, 256]
          }
        },
        {
          "ty": "st",
          "nm": "Stroke",
          "o": {
            "a": 0,
            "k": 100
          },
          "c": {
            "a": 0,
            "k": [0.114, 0.157, 0.282]
          },
          "lc": 2,
          "lj": 2,
          "ml": 0,
          "w": {
            "a": 0,
            "k": 20
          }
        },
        {
          "ty": "fl",
          "nm": "Fill",
          "o": {
            "a": 0,
            "k": 100
          },
          "c": {
            "a": 0,
            "k": [0.196, 0.314, 0.69]
          },
          "r": 1
        }
      ]
    }
  ]
}

== The dotLottie file format ==
dotLottie
- Filename extension: .lottie
- Internet media type: video/lottie+json
- Initial release: 2020
- Type of format: Vector animation
- Container for: Lottie
- Extended from: Zip file
- Website: dotlottie.io

In 2020, the dotLottie file format was proposed as a standard way to pack Lottie files with other resources. The file is actually a zip file compressed with the deflate method. It includes a manifest file and preview images to ease the manipulation of the files.
