= Bark (sound) =

Sound mainly produced by dogs

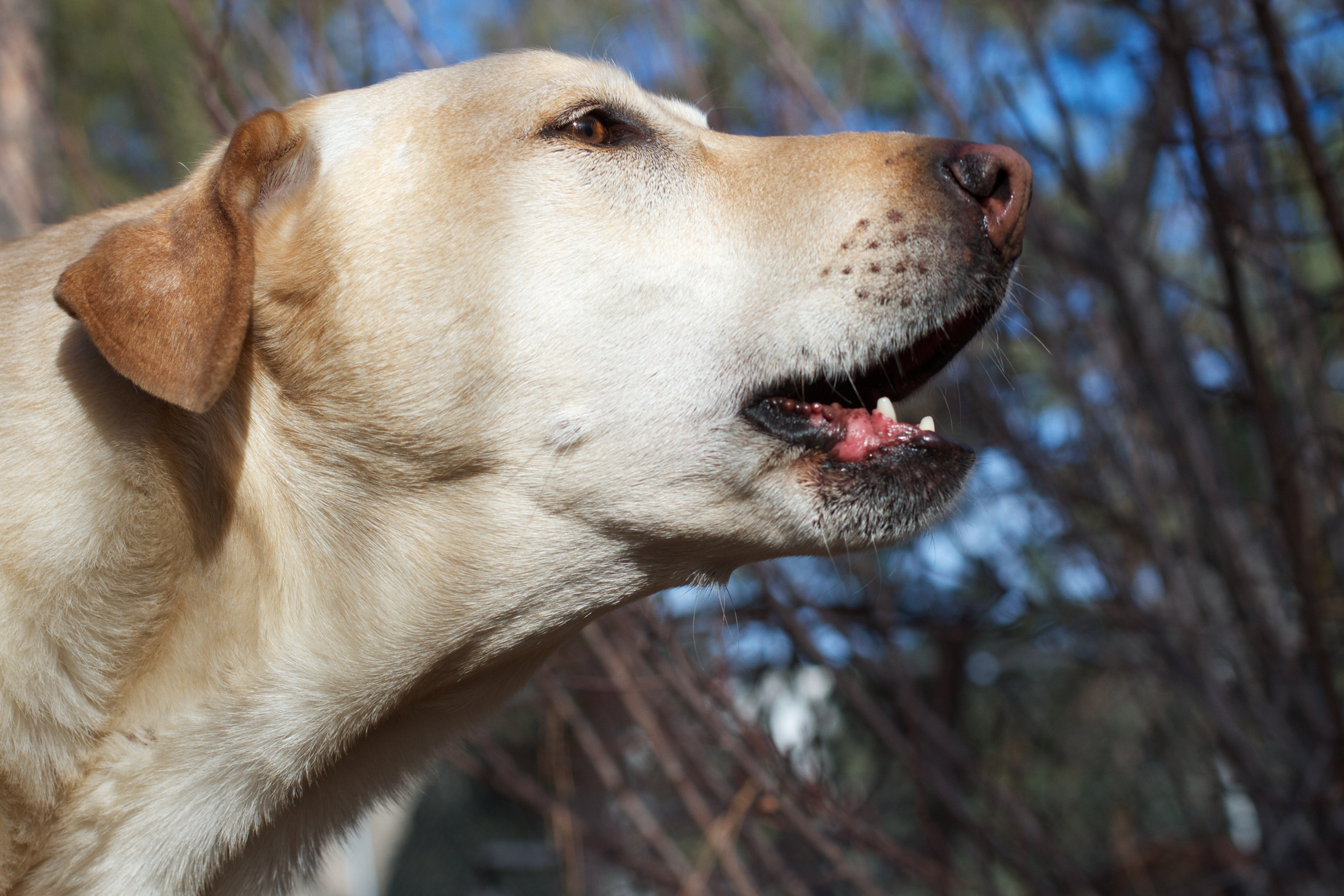
A dog barking

Moderately loud barking

A bark is a sound most often produced by dogs. Other animals that make this noise include, but are not limited to, wolves, coyotes, foxes, seals, frogs and owls. Bark is also a verb that describes the sound of many canids.

There is no precise, consistent, and functional acoustic definition for barking, but researchers classify barks according to several criteria. Researchers at the University of Massachusetts Amherst and Hampshire College have defined a bark as a short, abrupt vocalization that is relatively loud and high-pitched, changes in frequency, and often repeats rapidly in succession.

== In dogs ==
Dog barking is distinct from wolf barking. Wolf barks represent only 2.4% of all wolf vocalizations, in warning, defense, and protest. In contrast, dogs bark in many social situations, with acoustic communication in dogs being described as hypertrophic. While wolf barks tend to be brief and isolated, dog barking is often repetitive.

One hypothesis for why dogs bark more than wolves is that dogs developed vocal communication as a result of their domestication. Domestication can alter a species and affect its physical and physiological characteristics. Domesticated breeds show vast physical differences from their wild counterparts, an evolution that suggests neoteny, or the retention of juvenile characteristics in adults. The behaviour of adult dogs also shows puppy-like characteristics: dogs act submissive, whine, and bark often.

The frequency of barking in dogs compared to wolves could also be the product of the different social environments of dogs. From a young age, humans may be among a dog's primary social contacts, an environment that presents different stimuli than would be found by wolves in the wild. Intruders may frequent the boundaries of a captive dog's territory, thus triggering the bark response as a warning. Dogs also live in densely populated urban areas, allowing for more opportunities for socialization. For example, kennelled dogs may have increased barking due to a desire to facilitate social behaviour. Dogs' close relationship with humans also renders dogs reliant on humans, even for basic needs. Barking can be used as a way to attract attention, and any positive response exhibited by the owners reinforces the behaviour. For example, if a dog barks to get food and the owner feeds it, they are conditioned to continue said behaviour.

== Types ==
The purposes of barking by domestic dogs is a controversial topic. While barking is suggested to be "non-communicative", data suggests that it may indeed be a means of expression that became increasingly sophisticated during domestication. Due to the lack of consensus over whether or not dogs communicate using their barks, not much research has been done to categorize the different types of barking in dogs. Some existing research has been criticized by Feddersen-Petersen as "lack[ing] objectivity". Using sonographic methods, Feddersen-Petersen identified several distinct types of barks, then analysed them for meanings, functions, and emotions. He separated dog barks into subgroups based on said sonographic data:

Bark	Characteristics	Behavior
Infantile bark (pup yelp)	Harmonic	Emitted spontaneously in protest or as a distress call
Harmonic play bark	Mixed sounds involving "concurrent superimposition" of growls, noisy bark	After barking, play behavior was often observed.
"Christmas tree" bark	Sonogram displayed "Christmas tree" effect. There is a "sequential loss of overtones".	Seen in German Shepherds and Alaskan Malamutes.
Noisy overlappings	Short, overlapping sounds	Seen in poodles.
Pure harmonic sound		Often accompanied with play behavior.
Specific vibrato-growl		
Noisy bark		Agonistic contexts only. Seen in Alaskan Malamutes.
Play-solicited barks	Often combined with growls, other bark subunits.	Matched with play behavior
Noisy play bark	Harsh, short sound. Low-pitched, with an extremely short, sharp rise.	Associated with more harsh play-fighting seen often in American Staffordshire Terriers and Bull Terriers. "Often show[ed] changeovers to aggressive interactions."
Threat bark	Short, low-pitched sound.	
Warning bark	Short, low-pitched sound.	

Not all breeds demonstrate every subgroup of barking. Instead, there is significant variance in vocalization between different breeds. Poodles show the least of all barking subunits. Barking in wolves was observed as less diverse. For example, wolf barks are rarely harmonic, tending instead to be noisy.

There is some evidence that humans can determine the suspected emotions of dogs while listening to barks emitted during specific situations. Humans scored the emotions of dogs performing these barks very similarly and in ways that made sense according to the context. In one example, when subjects were played a recording of a dog tied alone to a tree, a situation in which one could infer that the dog would be distressed, the human listeners tended to rank the bark as having a high level of despair. Some suggest that this may be evidence that dog barks have evolved to be a form of communication with humans, since humans can determine a dog's needs by listening to their vocalizations. Further studies have found that the acoustic structure of a bark "[varies] considerably with context." These studies suggest that barks are more than just random sounds, and hold some communicative purpose.

== As noise pollution ==
=== Causes and solutions ===
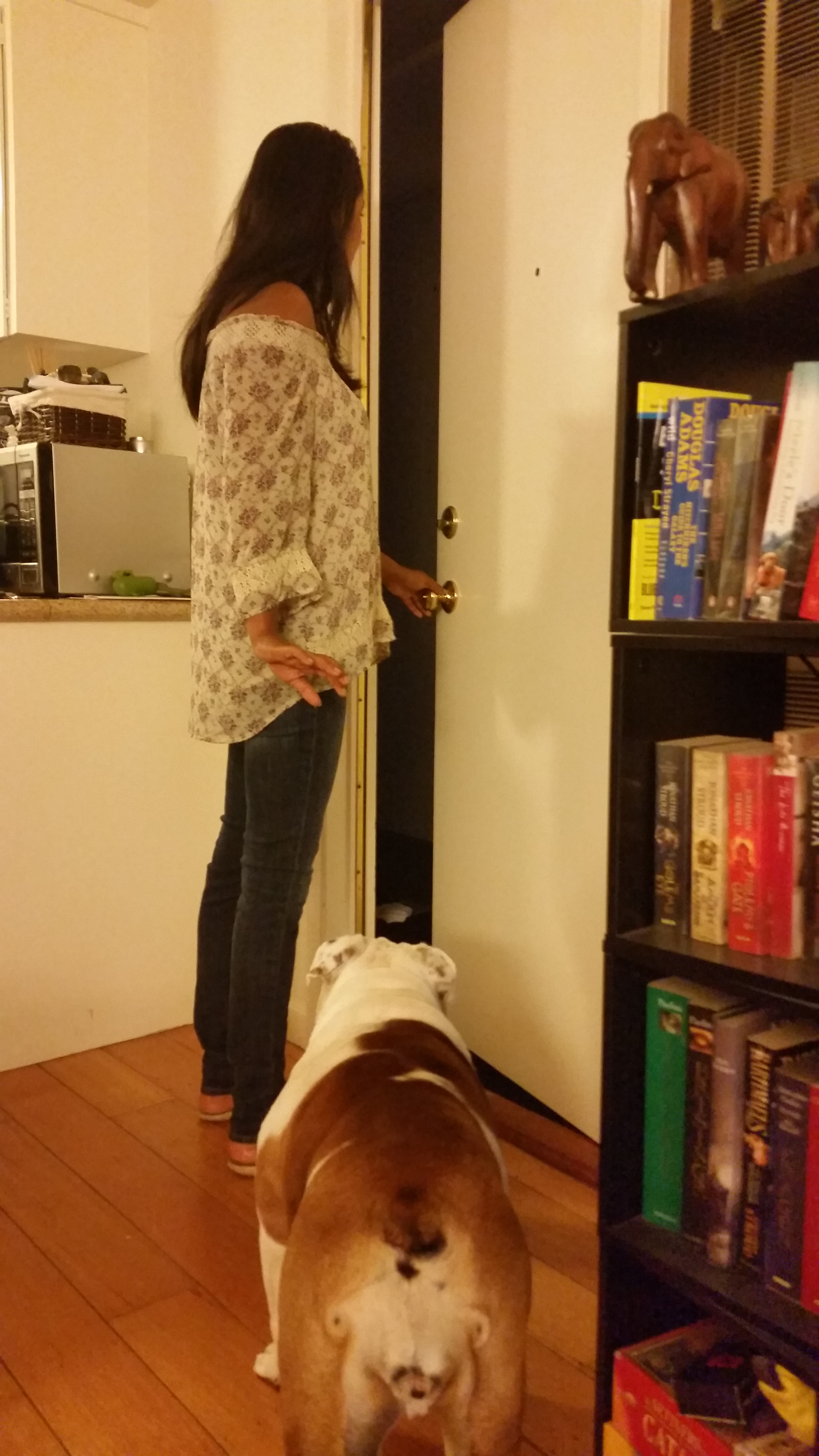
Signaling to a dog with the palm of the hand is prescribed as a way to address a dog that is alert barking.

Different kinds of barking require different approaches to reduction.

==== Common approaches ====
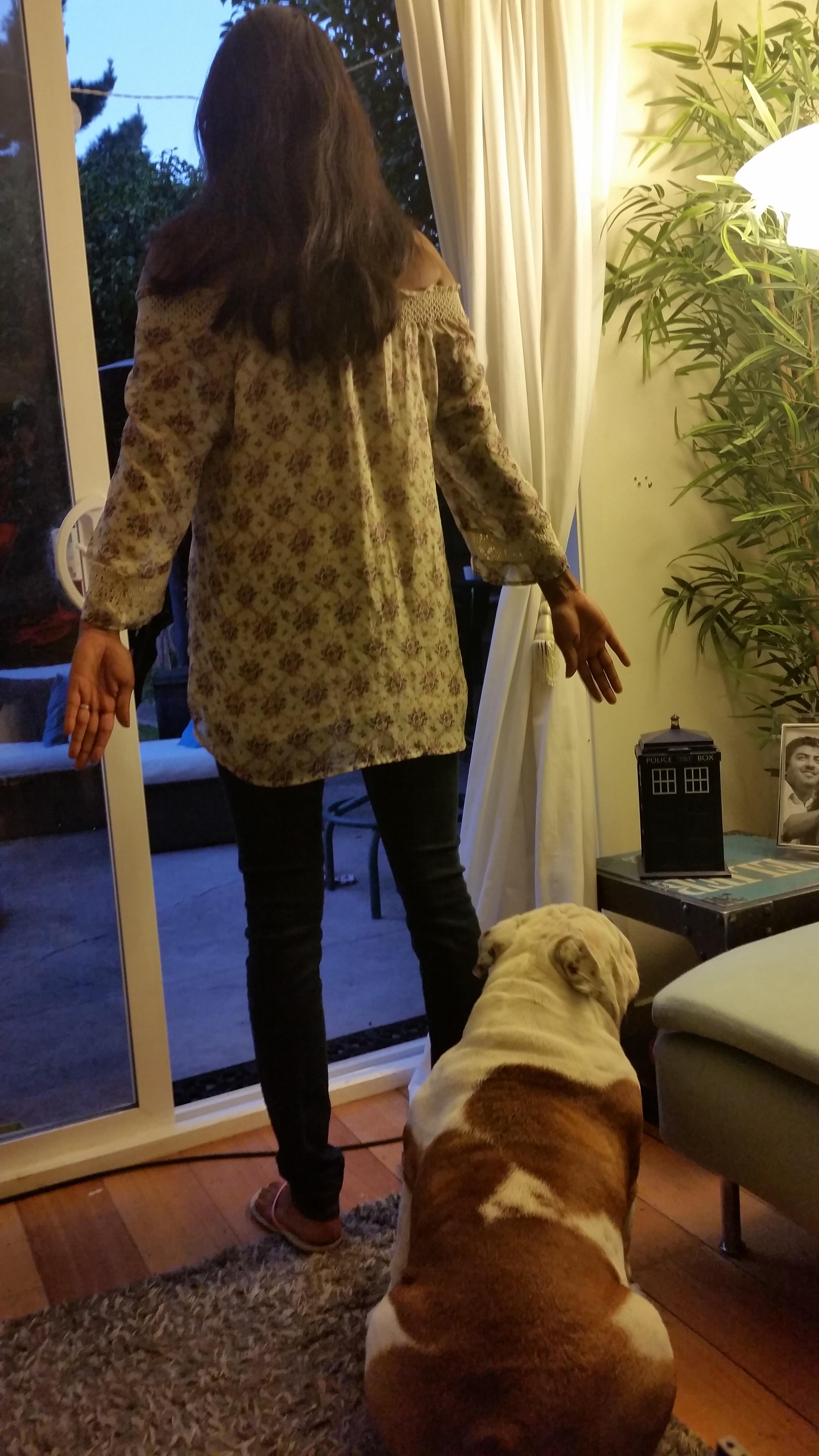
Splitting is prescribed as a way to address a dog that is alert barking.

Barking is a normal behaviour for dogs. What counts as excessive barking is a subjective idea. Excessive dog barking can be a nuisance and a common problem that dog owners or their neighbors may face. Excessive barking indicates an underlying problem, a trigger or the dog lacking exercise or mental stimulation. Reasons for excessive barking can be, among others, pain, fear, boredom, frustration, separation anxiety or territorial behaviour (warning about potential threats).

Dog owners can use positive training methods to correct excessive barking. This may be through repeated exposure to stimuli that causes barking whilst calming the dog, distraction through treats or praise as the stimulus happens, or by use of clicker training. In her 2008 book Barking: The Sound of a Language, Turid Rugaas suggests the use of hand signals and calming signals called 'splitting' to calm a barking dog.

If all other methods have been tried, a last effort is using a bark collar. These collars might release an unpleasant smell or mild to painful shock. Various bark collars have been praised and criticized; some are considered inhumane by various people and groups. Critics consider them torturous and compare their use to electrocution. However, most Societies for the Prevention of Cruelty to Animals agree that in a last resort an electric collar is better than euthanasia if it comes to an ultimatum, for a stubborn dog that will not stop any other way. Most agree that understanding the communication and retraining by reward is the most effective and humane method.

=== Surgical debarking ===
The controversial surgical procedure known as 'debarking' or 'bark softening' is a veterinary procedure for modifying the voice box so that a barking dog will make a significantly reduced noise. It is considered a last resort by some owners claiming that it is better than euthanasia, seizure, or legal problems if the matter has proven incapable of being corrected any other way.

Debarking is illegal in many European states and is opposed by animal welfare organizations.

== Breeds ==
The Huntaway is a working dog that has been selectively bred to drive stock (usually sheep) by using its voice. It was bred in New Zealand, and is bred based on ability rather than appearance or lineage.

== Naturally "barkless" dog breeds ==
Compared to most domestic dogs, the bark of a dingo is short and monosyllabic. During observations, the Australian dingo's bark has a small variability; sub-groups of bark types, common among domestic dogs, could not be found. Furthermore, just 5% of the observed vocalizations consisted of barking. Australian dingoes bark only in swooshing noises or a mixture of atonal and tonal. Also, barking is almost exclusively used for giving warnings. Warn-barking in a homotypical sequence and a kind of "warn-howling" in a heterotypical one have also been observed. The bark-howling starts with several barks and then fades into a rising and ebbing howl and is probably, similarly to coughing, used to warn the puppies and members of the pack. Dingoes also emit a sort of "wailing" sound, which they use most often when approaching a water hole, probably to warn already present dingoes. According to current knowledge, it is impossible to get Australian dingoes to bark more often by making them associate with other domestic dogs. However, Alfred Brehm reported a dingo that learned the more "typical" form of barking and knew how to use it, while its brother did not. Whether dingoes bark or bark-howl less overall is unknown.

The extinct Hare Indian dog of northern Canada was not known to bark in its native homeland, though puppies born in Europe learned how to imitate the barking of other dogs. When hurt or afraid, it howled like a wolf, and when curious, it made a sound described as a growl building up to a howl.

The Basenji of central Africa produces a yodel-like sound due to its unusually shaped larynx. This trait also gives the Basenji the nickname "Barkless Dog".

== In other animals ==
Besides dogs and wolves, other canines like coyotes and jackals can bark. Their barks are similar to those of wolves and dogs.

The warning bark of a fox is higher and more drawn out than barks of other canids.

There are non-canine species with vocalizations that may be described as barking. Because the alarm call of the muntjac resembles a dog's bark, they are sometimes known as "barking deer". Eared seals are also known to bark. Prairie dogs employ complex communication involving barks and rhythmic chirps. Various bird species produce vocalizations that include the canonical features of barking, especially when avoiding predators. Some primate species, notably gorillas, can and do vocalize in short barks.

== See also ==
- Animal communication
- Debarking
- Dog communication
- Dog training
- Growling
- Howling
- Bow-wow Battle
