= Kingdoms of the Dump =

- Developer: Roach Games
- Publisher: Roach Games
- Director: Roach
- Programmer: Solar Mongoose
- Artist: DM404
- Writer: Everdredd
- Composers: Bobby Ghostly; William Kage
- Engine: Godot v2.1
- Platforms: Windows, macOS, Linux
- Release: November 18, 2025
- Genres: Role-playing, platform
- Mode: Single-player

Kingdoms of the Dump is an independent role-playing video game developed by Roach Games. The game takes heavy inspiration from classic 16-bit JRPGs like Chrono Trigger, EarthBound, and Final Fantasy VI. Development of the game was initially funded fully out-of-pocket, with the developers working full-time as custodians; this inspired the theming of the game around garbage. The developers launched a Kickstarter campaign in July 2019 for additional funding, and it was successful. The game released on Windows, macOS and Linux via Steam on November 18, 2025.

== Gameplay ==
Kingdoms of the Dump features a turn-based battle system that employs a 3x3 grid in which the player can strategically position their party.

Kingdoms of the Dump is a role-playing game that features platforming and adventure elements. On the field, the player controls one character, but can switch between a total of six characters at will; each character has a unique ability that the player can use to explore the environment, solve puzzles, and progress. Platforming and elevation in general play a large role in the exploration of towns and dungeons. The game does not have random battles; instead, players approach enemies on the field and enter a separate battle screen. Kingdoms of the Dump features a turn-based battle system that employs a 3x3 grid in which the player can position their party around to maximize damage, avoid traps and spells, and strategize.

The game takes heavy inspiration from several 16-bit role-playing games. The battle system features timed hits, a mechanic inspired by Super Mario RPG. The player will be able to unlock an airship and be able to traverse a vast Mode 7-like world map, inspired by Final Fantasy VI. The game also uses an "oblique" EarthBound-inspired perspective, an angle the developers used to help show depth during platforming segments.

== Plot ==
The game is set in the "Lands of Fill", made up of five and a half kingdoms. The king of one of the kingdoms, Garbagia, has been "trashpicked", and a disgraced squire, Dustin Binsley, is blamed for it. He must embark on a mission across the kingdoms of the Lands of Fill to rescue the King, clear his name and uncover the evil organization trying to destroy the kingdoms. Dustin, the trashcan knight, is accompanied on his journey by his best friend Ratavia, librarian Walker Jacket, bard Lute, laundromancer Cerulean, and master of disguise Musk. Along his journey, Dustin and his party must also stop Lord 8 Ball and the Toxic Grimelin Army from destroying the Lands of Fill.

== Development and release ==
Development of Kingdoms of the Dump began in 2016 by Roach Games, made up of pseudonymous developers Roach and Everdredd. Roach had initially been working on an EarthBound fangame titled Eagleland for several years before cancelling it and assembling a new team for an original IP. Roach and Everdredd both work as custodians full-time and funded the game's development out-of-pocket until July 2019, when they launched a Kickstarter crowdfunding campaign. The campaign officially launched on July 15, 2019, with a goal of $60,000, and was successfully funded, with a final pledge count of $76,560.

Roach primarily took inspiration from several role-playing games on the SNES, including but not limited to EarthBound, Chrono Trigger, Super Mario RPG, and Final Fantasy VI. Roach and Everdredd's custodial professions inspired the theming of the game as well. The game's art was developed by DM404 using a combination of Microsoft Paint, Adobe Photoshop, and GraphicsGale.

The game's music was primarily composed by Bobby Ghostly, with guest composer William Kage handling music engineering using SNES soundfonts. Composer Hiroki Kikuta composed a guest track for the game's soundtrack as well, following the Kickstarter campaign reaching one of its stretch goals.

Kingdoms of the Dump was developed using the Godot game engine, version 2.1. The game has controller support. The game released on Windows, macOS and Linux via Steam on November 18, 2025; Roach has stated the game will not be exclusive to the Epic Games Store.
