= Brother Hai's Pho Restaurant =

2025 video game

- Developer: marisa0704
- Engine: Godot
- Platforms: Microsoft Windows, Linux
- Release: 23 October 2025
- Genre: Horror

Brother Hai's Pho Restaurant (Vietnamese: Tiệm Phở Của Anh Hai) is an indie horror video game developed by Vietnamese independent developer marisa0704 using the Godot engine. The game is inspired by Vietnamese culture, featuring elements of everyday Vietnamese life. It was released as a free, name-your-own-price title on itch.io for Windows and Linux in October 2025. The game gained significant viral popularity in Vietnam shortly after its release, leading to widespread memes, social media discussions, and even fictional check-ins on Google Maps.

== Plot ==
Players assume the role of Anh Hai, the owner of a newly opened pho restaurant in a seemingly peaceful village in Đan Phượng district, Hanoi. Starting with routine tasks like serving customers and socializing, the protagonist uncovers dark secrets in the village and confronts personal haunting pasts to survive and keep the business running.

== Development ==
The game was developed by marisa0704, an independent Vietnamese developer, as a personal project inspired by Vietnamese culture. It was created using the Godot engine and released on itch.io in 2025.

== Reception ==
It became a viral sensation in Vietnam, topping search trends and inspiring memes, fan art, and social media content. The fictional restaurant location at "No. 10 Đan Phượng" led to numerous fake Google Maps entries with high ratings. The game's cultural elements, such as references to Vietnamese daily life and memes, contributed to its success, drawing comparisons to other viral Vietnamese games like Flappy Bird.
