= Sandbox game =

Type of freeform video game encouraging creativity

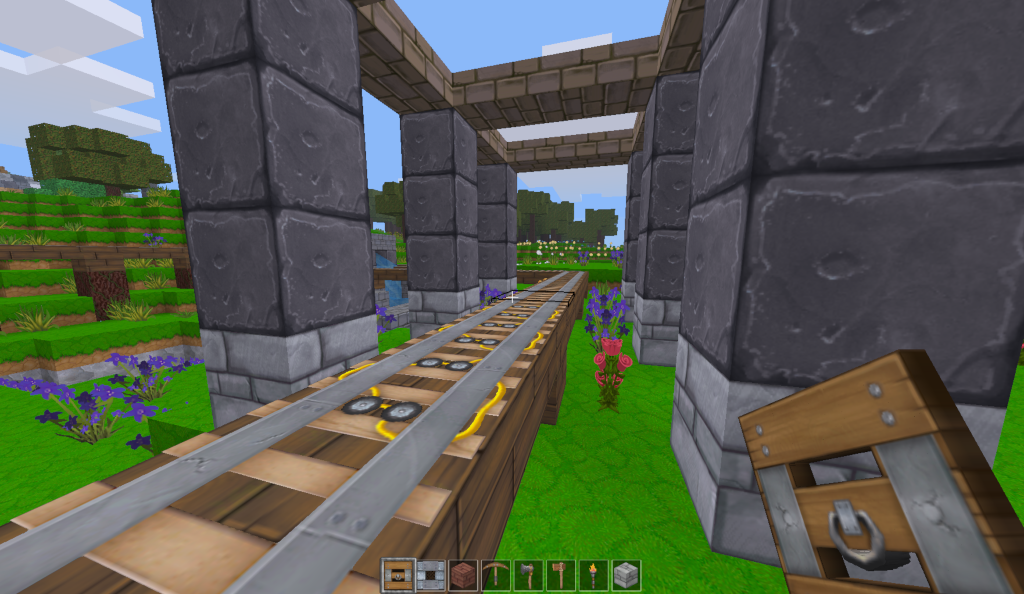
Screenshot of a player constructing minecart rails in a sandbox game in the free engine Luanti

A sandbox game is a video game that gives players broad freedom to experiment with interacting systems and pursue self-chosen goals. Sandbox design may minimize predetermined objectives or narrative progression and often supports emergent gameplay, in which complex situations arise from the interaction of comparatively simple mechanics.

Sandbox design is often combined with an open world, but the terms describe different features. An open world concerns freedom of movement through the game space, whereas a sandbox concerns freedom to experiment with the game's systems. A game can therefore be open-world without offering substantial sandbox-style interaction.

Early sandbox games took the form of space trading and combat games like Elite (1984) and city-building simulations and tycoon games like SimCity (1989). The release of The Sims and Grand Theft Auto III, in 2000 and 2001 respectively, demonstrated that games with highly detailed interacting systems that encouraged player experimentation could also be seen as sandbox games. Some sandbox games involve the ability to interact socially and share user-generated content across the Internet, as in Second Life (2003). Sandbox games Garry's Mod (2006) and Dreams (2020) allow players to use the game's systems to create new environments and modes. Minecraft (2009) is the most successful example of a sandbox game, with players able to enjoy both creative modes and more progression-driven survival modes. Roblox (2006) allows users to create their own games using the Luau programming language. Fortnite (2017) has game modes which allow players to interact competitively, or socialise.

== Terminology ==
From a video game development standpoint, a sandbox game incorporates elements of sandbox design, a range of game systems that encourage free play and creativity. Sandbox design can either describe a game or a game mode, with an emphasis on free-form gameplay, relaxed rules, and minimal goals. Sandbox design can also describe a type of game development where a designer slowly adds features to a minimal game experience, experimenting with each element one at a time. There are "a lot of varieties" of sandbox design, based on "a wide range of dynamic interactive elements". Thus, the term is used often, without a strict definition. Game designers sometimes define a sandbox as what it is not, where a game can "subtract the missions, the main campaign, the narrative or whatever formatively binds the game's progression, and you have a sandbox."

In game design, a sandbox is a metaphor for playing in a literal sandbox. Game historian Steve Breslin describes "the metaphor [as] a child playing in a sandbox ... produc[ing] a world from sand", compared to games with more fully formed content. This metaphor between the virtual and literal sandbox is noted by architectural scholar Alexandra Lange, with a sandbox describing any bounded environment that offers freedom to explore and construct. This can distinguish it from conventional ideas of a game, where the metaphorical sandbox is a "play space in which people can try on different roles and imaginary quests ... rather than a 'game' to play."

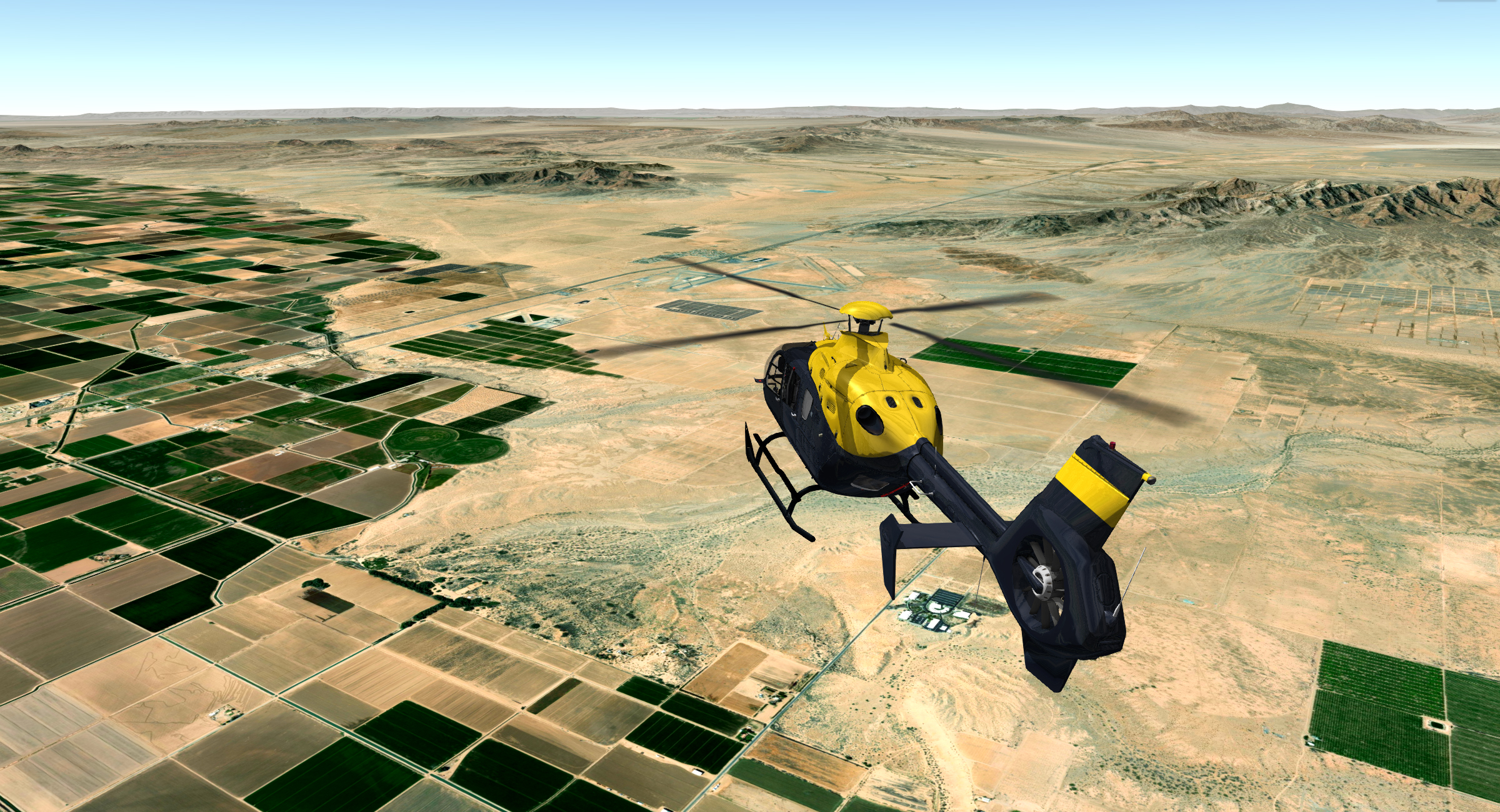
Open world flight simulator GeoFS

In describing video games, sandbox design is often associated with the open world gameplay mechanic and vice versa, but these are two disparate concepts. Open worlds are those where the player's movement in the virtual world is typically not limited by the game allowing the player to roam freely through it. Adventure on the Atari 2600 is considered an open world game as the player can explore the entire game world save for through locked gates from the start, but it is not considered to have sandbox design as the player's actions are generally restricted. Similarly, games like Microsoft Flight Simulator are also open world since the player can take their plane anywhere in the game's virtual world, but as there is no creative aspects to the game, would not be considered a sandbox.

== Characteristics ==
Sandbox design can incorporate several different game mechanics and structures, including open worlds, nonlinear storytelling, emergent behaviors, and automation of believable agents. It represents a shift away from linear gameplay. This freedom is always a question of degree, as a sandbox design "engenders a sense of player control, without actually handing over the reins entirely".

Player creativity is often included in sandbox design. When a player is allowed to use a game as a sandbox, they gain the freedom to be creative with their gameplay. A sandbox will have a combination of game mechanics and player freedom that can lead to emergent gameplay, where a player discovers solutions to challenges that may not be intended by the developers. A sandbox sometimes gives the player "transformative" power over the game world, where "the free movement of play alters the more rigid structure in which it takes shape." Will Wright describes this generative aspect of sandbox designs, leading to a measurable increase in player possibilities. John Smedley describes this type of emergent gameplay more succinctly, having seen in EverQuest "how hungry people are for sandboxes -- for building stuff". GameDeveloper.com notes the growth of player-generated content as a "particular brand of sandbox design: that game design is so fun in itself that, if properly packaged, it can well be reinterpreted as gameplay itself".

Some games offer a separate sandbox mode, where the player can use a game's creative systems with fewer constraints. "This mode has few restrictions on what he may do and offers no guidance on what he should do." For example, a sandbox mode might unlock unlimited resources, or disable enemy threats. A sandbox mode is separate from the campaign mode, without a main narrative progression. In one sense, an approach to this design is to "enable the player to continue after the main storyline has been 'won'."

Many games' tutorials utilize this type of design, since "sandboxes are game play much like the real game, but where things cannot go too wrong too quickly or, perhaps, even at all. Good games offer players, either as tutorials or as their first level or two, sandboxes." The game designers allow players to experiment in a safe environment, as "the point about open-ended/sandbox design and when they work best in teaching the player is through learning by doing".

Cohesive narratives in sandbox design can be difficult since the player can progress through the game in a non-linear manner. Some sandbox designs empower players to create their own stories, which is described as sandbox storytelling. Sandbox stories can either replace or enhance a main plot. Some games give players "pure agency by giving them tools and a sandbox", sacrificing the story in favor of player creativity. Where the game systems are reactive enough, this "does not remove the narrative, but rather transforms predetermined narrative into dynamic, responsive narrative". According to Ernest Adams, "in sandbox storytelling, the idea is to give the player a big open world populated with opportunities for interesting interactions ... in any order". Sandbox stories can also be told through shorter quests, conversations, collectables, and encounters, all of which reward players for engaging with the world. This side-content becomes an "extremely common and an excellent format for sandbox gameplay: one central campaign (itself perhaps multi-threaded), plus a large number of side-missions". In general, sandbox storytelling occurs when the player can move through the story independently of their movement through the game space.

Designers also refer to sandbox worlds and sandbox game spaces, which create the feeling of a large open world. The concept of an open world is much older than the term sandbox. Overall, "a sandbox design usually means that the game space is not divided into discrete units", which emphasizes continuity and exploration. This can sometimes overwhelm the player, which is why successful game designers draw on "urban design principles that can be used to build successful sandbox spaces". As a best practice "when creating these sandbox worlds, [designers] should divide them up into distinct areas to aid the player's navigation and orientation." Overall, a sandbox world should "provide the player with a large open set of spaces in which to play, and give him or her things to do". "The more a game's design tends towards a sandbox style, the less a player will feel obliged to follow the main quest."

Game designers often need to create more dynamic game systems to support sandbox-style gameplay. Physics systems are part of the sandbox experience of several games. The popularity of voxels has also shown another system that can create "colourful sandboxes to dismantle and reconstruct."

There is also the value of more robust artificial intelligence. GameDeveloper.com notes how "a sandbox means that the whole game becomes more of a simulation where AI plays an important role." This means that "believable and self-motivated characters have become key to sandbox play, because they produce a rich space for interactivity and greatly help establish the open-world aesthetic." Game designer John Krajewski observes for "a game that features sandbox-style play, the AI needs to provide enough different and interesting characters to interact within the world, and the size of the world doesn't have to get very big before it becomes unfeasible to hard code them all."

An open-ended sandbox experience is sometimes contrasted with goal-oriented gameplay. Sandbox design usually minimizes the importance of goals. Rather than 'winning' a game, a sandbox design allows players to 'complete' a game by exploring and actualizing all of its options. This lack of victory condition may define sandbox as not a game at all. "For many, a game needs rules and a goal to be a game, which excludes sandbox/simulators." In sandbox mode, "the game resembles a tool more than a conventional video game".

== History ==
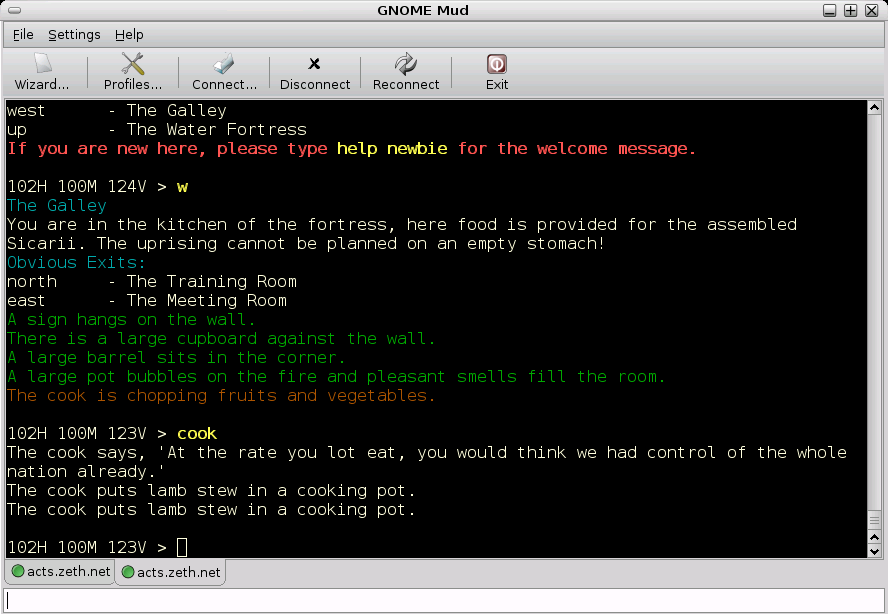
A screenshot of a MUD

Multi-user dungeons (MUDs) are early examples of the principles of sandbox games originating in 1980; users of MUDs would generally be able to gain the ability to create their content within the MUD's framework, creating opportunities to collaborate with other users. However, MUDs never gained commercial release; while they inspired the first massively multiplayer online (MMO) games like EVE Online, the creation aspects of MUDs did not carry into commercial games.

At the end of the 20th century, sandbox games were developed as a result of games moving off the arcade machines and into the home. With less concern about monetization through loss in games, designers were able to make games that were slower-paced and less stressful.

Before 2000, the bulk of what were considered sandbox games in commercial software came from two genres:

- Space trading and combat games: Elite (1984) is considered one of the first sandbox games: the player as a space pilot traveled across a randomly-generated galaxy, engaging in combat with enemies (one of the first games to use simulated 3D combat through wireframe graphics) and trading resources at various planets to improve their ship towards the best class possible, but otherwise the player has freedom towards completing this goal. Elite led to several similar trading and combat games, including The Seven Cities of Gold (1984), Sid Meier's Pirates! (1987), Star Control (1990), and Freelancer (2003).
- City-building and tycoon games: Early city-building games like Utopia (1982) were more focused on arranging city features for achieving high scores, but with SimCity (1989), Will Wright wanted to give players more freedom to create a city and see how it operates while challenging the player to manage the growth of the city against its finances. SimCity's success led to many similar city-building and other tycoon games including Railroad Tycoon (1990), SimIsle (1995), and Capitalism (1995).

Two games at the turn of the 21st century redefined the notion of what a sandbox game is.

- The Sims (2000) is a life simulation game where the player interactions with simulated humans in a house as they go about their daily lives. Life simulation games were not a new genre, but prior games such as Little Computer People (1985) had very limited artificial intelligence beyond the simulated humans, limiting the number of interactions that a player had with the simulation and making such games more curiosities. With The Sims, the simulated humans were given more detailed and believable behavior based on studies in artificial life, which led to players experimenting more with the simulated humans and exploring the simulations. In terms of defining the sandbox, The Sims was considered a freeform game, but added sets of minimal goals through the game to guide the player and encourage progression. The Sims became a best-selling title in the United States in 2000 and a long-running franchise for Electronic Arts. Further life simulation games would follow, such as Spore (2008).
- Grand Theft Auto III (2001) is an action-adventure game in which the player takes the role of a small-time crook in a large city, completing various missions for bosses for the game. This was the first game in the open world Grand Theft Auto series to be set in a three-dimensional world, prior games having been played from a top-down perspective, and the first game to include a detailed physics engine for the various interaction of objects in the world. The combination of the game's open world and physics system allowed players to explore how they could cause havoc within the game, making the game a virtual sandbox with players to toy with. In this manner, Grand Theft Auto III added the idea of emergent gameplay as a feature of sandbox games. Grand Theft Auto III succeeded The Sims as the best-selling game in the United States in 2001; In addition to its highly-successful sequels, Grand Theft Auto III led to a genre of derivative Grand Theft Auto clones focused on criminal activities such as the Saints Row series, as well as a broad range of open world, action-adventure games such as the Assassin's Creed and Far Cry series. This action game broadened expectations of a sandbox, a concept that was previously reserved for experiences like SimCity.

These two games would become a major influence on many different games and genres to come. In 2007, game designer Warren Spector noted the influence of Will Wright on numerous designers, but was surprised that there weren't more who "mimic Wright's games or his sandbox-style, saying titles in the Grand Theft Auto look-alike genre are about the closest most developers have come to doing so." This influence led to a trend, and by 2010 critics were noting that "almost every blockbuster game now contains a considerable 'sandbox' element." This trend was linked to the rise of dynamic storytelling in sandbox worlds, as well as AI that is dynamic enough to supplement scripted content.

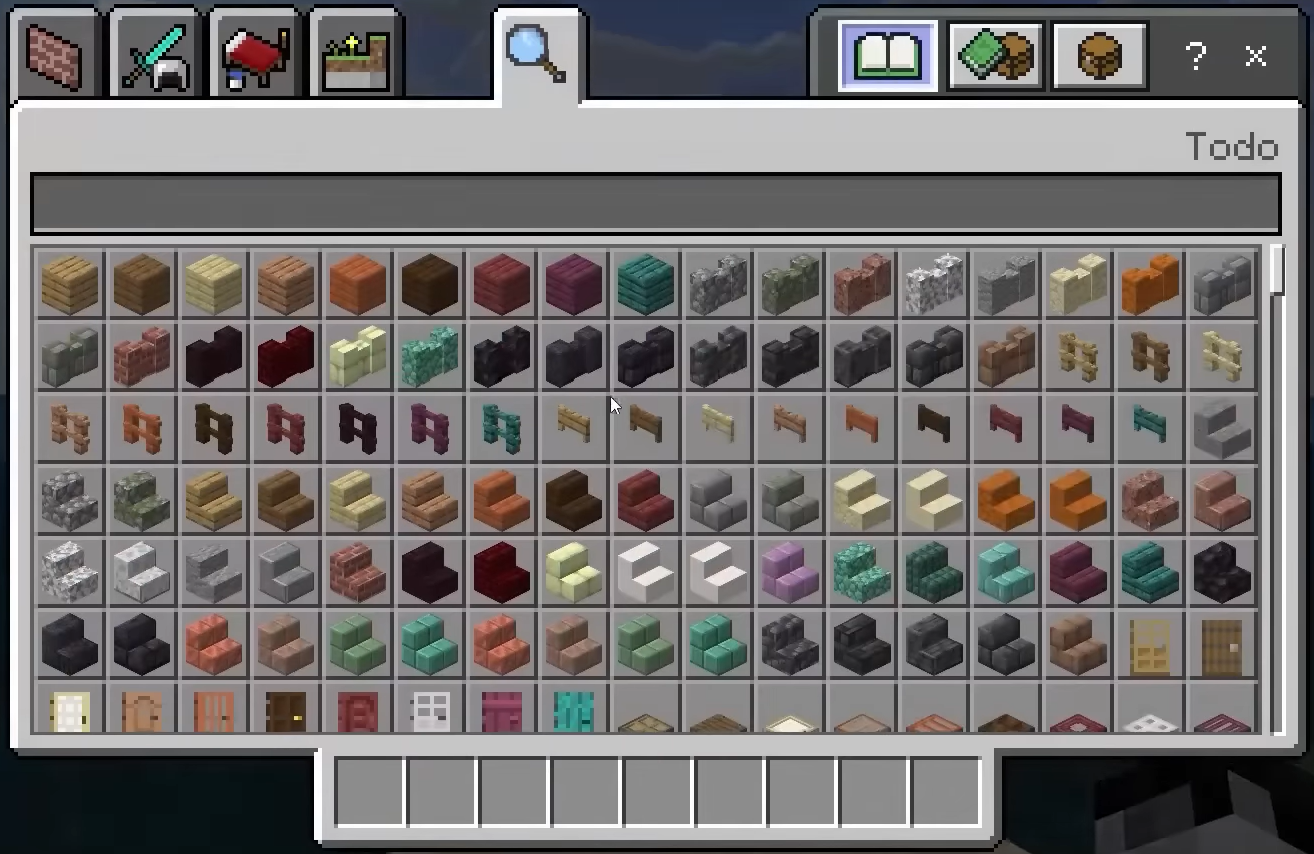
The creative mode inventory in Minecraft. In creative mode, the player has little to no restrictions and unlimited resources.

Another major shift in sandbox games came with the release of Minecraft, which was first introduced in 2009 in beta form and its first full release in 2011. At its core, Minecraft is a voxel-based survival game, where players collect resources to build tools that help them to collect better resources, and to construct shelters to protect them from hostile creatures. However, there are no limits on how players can build these structures, and using the vast array of resources available in the game, players can build nearly anything they could imagine; the game has been compared to digital Lego bricks. Players' use of Minecraft in this way led to the developers to add a dedicated "Creative Mode" that stripped the survival elements from the game so that players could build without any hazards or other artificial limits. Minecraft became a massive success, having sold more than 180 million copies by May 2019 and being the best selling personal computer game of all time. Minecraft has inspired a number of similar games, such as Allumeria and Lucid Blocks.

One pure sandbox game, aimed to offer no goals but allow players to create works to be shared with others, is Second Life (2003), a large massively multiplayer online game set in a virtual world where users could create various sections of the world as their own. The game was purposely developed as a community-driven world, so while the developers established some of the fundamentals of the in-game economies, much of how the workings and economics of the rest of Second Life's world was set by the players, which created several issues around pricing, gambling, and taxes, among other aspects. The game ultimately drew use by businesses as well, seeking to create space within it.

More recent sandbox games have been aimed at providing interactive works that can be shared with others. Garry's Mod allows players to tinker with the Source engine from Valve to make animations and games while games like LittleBigPlanet and Dreams (2019) from Media Molecule give users assets and primitive programming elements to craft games that can be shared with others.

== Influence on other genres ==
In time, sandbox design have become a mainstay in survival games, as well as a popular subset of shooters, and RPGs. Long-time series such as Metal Gear had made the "shift to an open-world sandbox design," where the game dynamically "adds more missions as the story progresses and players complete the available side-ops". Other long-running series such as Hitman were celebrated for their sandbox design. The series became influential, creating a new template of games "that echo the same emphasis on sandbox design, open-ended mission structure, and sneaking". In 2020, PC Gamer noted Mount & Blade as "a triumph of sandbox design". They observe that "because of its sandbox nature, Mount & Blade's quests are procedurally generated around many set templates," which leads to a game where "the simulation is the story".

Starting in the late 2000s, superhero games have also begun to incorporate sandbox elements. Unlike common sandbox games during that time, where players control a semi-grounded normal human, superhero sandbox games have premises that involved controlling superpowered beings in a large open-world environment. The first titles to utilize such premise were licensed superhero games such as Spider-Man 2 and Hulk: Ultimate Destruction. The release of the 2007 game Crackdown, redefined these gameplay elements by adding the ability to level up and earn new weapons and powers. The game went on to influence similar original sandbox games like the 2009 titles Infamous and Prototype. Infamous, in particular, added a morality system where the player can choose to be a superhero or a supervillain. Other established sandbox games such as Saints Row and Just Cause, also began to incorporate these gameplay in their recent titles.

== Criticism ==
Sandbox design has been criticized for providing a lack of satisfying goals for players. According to Ernest Adams, "plunking the player down in a sandbox and saying, 'have fun' isn't good enough. Especially at the beginning of a game, the player should have a clear sense of what to do next and, in particular, why." Christopher Totten observes that "sandbox elements can be mistakenly taken as fair replacements of narrative content; indeed, many games have missed their potential because they imagined that free-play would compensate for a lack of narrative. But even for our idealized child, playing around in a physical sandbox gets old pretty quick." Critics point to repetitive in-game tasks, arguing that an "overabundance of mundane events can get in the way of enjoying the sandbox." GameDeveloper.com notes that the quality of sandbox gameplay varies because "the great risk of the sandbox is that it can be boring." This is because "sand by itself is not much fun. Automated, complex, and perhaps most of all, directed responsiveness is essential to sandbox play, and the more complex and responsive the world, the more interesting the sandbox." In addition, sandbox games tend to be more expensive than other games to produce, in both money and time.

== Use in education ==
Some sandbox games have gained traction in educational settings, particularly to develop students' creativity and critical thinking skills.

Part of Microsoft's rationale for acquiring Mojang, developer of Minecraft, for US$2.5 billion in 2014 was for its potential application in science, technology, engineering, and mathematics (STEM) education, according to CEO Satya Nadella, as the game already helps to pique children's curiosity. Microsoft subsequently enhanced the MinecraftEDU version of the game into Minecraft: Education Edition (later known as Minecraft Education) that gives teachers and students numerous pre-made resources to work from. It features the ability for teachers to monitor and assist students in their work, but otherwise allows students to create and learn following several lesson plans developed by Microsoft, including within the aforementioned STEM subjects.

Research conducted during the 2018/2019 academic year suggested the educational potential of the Roblox platform. The study involved 53 students tasked to create a virtual environment using 3D models of the sculptural heritage of Santa Cruz de Tenerife. Students reported improvements in their understanding, not only of creating interactive worlds through Roblox, but also understanding of the sculptural heritage of the city.

Educators and schools leverage Roblox for their computer and programming lessons. Students learning with Roblox can use their game creation engine Roblox Studio; the creation of these games can inspire students to work creatively with various concepts.
