= The Rise of the Golden Idol =

2024 video game

- Developer: Color Gray Games
- Publisher: Playstack
- Designers: Andrejs Kļaviņš; Ernests Kļaviņš
- Programmer: Andrejs Kļaviņš
- Artist: Ernests Kļaviņš
- Composers: Paul Alexander; Kyle Misko
- Platforms: macOS; Windows; Nintendo Switch; Android; iOS; Xbox One; Xbox Series X/S; PlayStation 4; PlayStation 5
- Release: 12 November 2024: Windows, Mac, PS5, Xbox One, X/S; 12 November 2024; Nintendo Switch; 13 November 2024; Android; 15 November 2024; iOS; 19 November 2024
- Genre: Puzzle
- Mode: Single-player

The Rise of the Golden Idol is a 2024 puzzle video game developed by Color Gray Games and published by Playstack for PC and console and Netflix Games for mobile platforms. It is the sequel to the 2022 game The Case of the Golden Idol. The game received generally positive reviews. Four downloadable expansions were released over 2025: The Sins of New Wells, The Lemurian Phoenix, The Age of Restraint, and The Curse of the Last Reaper.

== Gameplay ==
Gameplay screenshot

Similar to The Case of the Golden Idol, The Rise of the Golden Idol is a puzzle video game in which players are presented with interactive scenes frozen in a point in time that depicts a murder or similar event. To complete a scene, players must interact with character dialog, objects, and texts in the scene to identify relevant keywords. These keywords are used to identify characters and complete sentences that describe the events depicted in the scene and the actions and motives of the characters. Expanding on the first game, each chapter in the game itself has one or more overarching narrative blocks that connects the event of each scene in that chapter and from earlier chapters that the player must solve to progress.

== Plot ==
The game follows the events of its predecessor, The Case of the Golden Idol, which concerned the supernatural powers of the Golden Idol, a relic of the Lemurian empire, and its use and misuse by figures in the eighteenth century. The Rise of the Golden Idol is set in the 1970s, long after the historical use of the Golden Idol has fallen into myth.

Around 1977, spiritualist Tesa Nevari gathers the pieces of the Golden Idol, but cannot assemble it properly; the OPIG Corporation, which provides her funding, seizes her offices and the Idol's parts. Oriel Toussaint, a historian and advisor to OPIG, recognizes how to assemble the Idol, but cannot ascertain its function. OPIG assembles a four-person research team dedicated to studying the Idol, consisting of research head Marie Westlake, supervisor Tim Spender, engineer Jack Nowak, and recently demoted janitor Eugene Marmot. Eugene inadvertently activates the Idol and reveals its true function, which is to transfer aspects between targets. OPIG promotes him to research head and demotes Marie, to the dismay of the other researchers. Eugene's first move is to hire Tesa as a consultant.

Further research reveals that the Idol can transfer memories between people and ancient "data disks," leading the device to be dubbed the "Information-Dispatching Optical Lens" (I.D.O.L.). Jack privately discovers that the I.D.O.L. can be modified to transfer a person's entire mind, though in the process, Oriel's mind is replaced with that of Echo Secunda, an ancient Lemurian, who disappears. After the team discovers that the I.D.O.L. works across television signals, OPIG approves a plan to use it to advertise soda during a peil game, upsetting Tesa and Jack, who wanted to use the I.D.O.L. to improve humanity. Tesa quits OPIG, while Jack experiments with the I.D.O.L. in secret. Worried about Eugene's ambition and incompetence, Marie and Tim plan to sabotage him.

During the peil game, Marie and Tim replace the advertisement with an unpleasant memory of the soda, but Jack replaces the memory with the mind of his uncle Isaac, a mathematician. Eugene learns of Marie and Tim's plot and shuts off the broadcast just as it begins, leaving only Jack's mind replaced. Tesa and a group of her followers barge into the station and destroy the I.D.O.L. Echo is caught and institutionalized, but kills a nurse and escapes. OPIG fires Marie and Tim, while Eugene takes Tim's position.

=== The Sins of New Wells ===
After Echo escapes the mental institution, he steals parts from the destroyed I.D.O.L. to create a weapon called the Disarranger that can rearrange both objects and memories. He is caught by a local gang overseen by businesswoman Hildegard Bauer, and offers to help improve the power of the Disarranger for her purposes. Bauer is attempting to gain the trust of mayor Moira Meredith by using her gang to weaken a rival one, secretly acquiring properties to start a large illegal drug empire. The rival gang learns of Hildegard's plans and send evidence to Moira, who announces a press conference. Hildegard intends to have Echo use the Disarranger on Moira just before the conference to scramble her memories, but detective Roy Samson, who has been following Echo since his escape, comes upon and disrupts the plan. Roy gives chase to Echo, who uses the Disarranger but it affects both of them. Echo and Oriel's memories become mixed up as he flees, while Roy still functions as a detective, albeit with translation help from his partner.

=== The Lemurian Phoenix ===
In 1940, Pravi Nagasai, the "first sentinel" of Lemuria and thus its highest religious authority, is murdered by his son Koi. The sentinelship passes to Koi and his brother Ori. While Koi uses his position to pursue material gain, Ori and his followers live an ascetic lifestyle near the country's sacred waterfall, which Ori believes communicates divine messages. The Lemurian government later executes two magicians for blaspheming against Pravi, leaving their son, Jamati Pirra, to swear revenge against both sentinels and Lemuria's king, Lutri.

In 1945, Jamati has become Koi's trusted aide. He is tasked with burying a dead body near the waterfall and learns that there is an alcove behind it. Jamati hides behind the waterfall and reveals Koi's patricide to Ori, convincing him to engage in a trial by ordeal where the brothers will be chained together in Koi's home, which will be set on fire. Koi agrees to the challenge, but builds a hidden bunker in his home to ensure he survives. During the trial, however, Jamati hides in the bunker and locks it, leaving both Koi and Ori to die. He is proclaimed first sentinel as a result, and in a meeting with Lutri, stabs him to death before fleeing the country.

=== The Age of Restraint ===
Ancient Lemuria is a technologically advanced society, though it adopts a "restraint policy" that prevents its territorial expansion and requires "sentinels" to confiscate any unauthorized technology. One sentinel, Heco Sift, disagrees with the restraint policy and creates a plan to use confiscated artifacts to indoctrinate the entire Lemurian population into imperialism. He successfully steals the artifacts, including the Golden Idol, with the aid of two co-conspirators, but the other sentinels follow the three. Realizing that Heco himself is being tracked, the other thieves use the Idol to transfer Heco's mind into a disk, but shortly after, they die in a teleportation accident, leaving Heco trapped in the disk. It is then revealed that Heco is actually "Echo Secunda," the Lemurian occupying Oriel Toussaint's body.

=== The Curse of the Last Reaper ===
In 1797, Captain Jacques Triton learns of a Lemurian ship from his crewman Walter Keene, and they pillage the vessel, stealing a Lemurian artifact called the Whishbloom, the scent of which transforms people into animals. Knowing that authorities will be searching their vessel at port, Triton directs some of his crew to hide the Whishbloom on a remote island, but Walter is caught smuggling the Whishbloom back onto the ship, leading the group to maroon him on the island. Walter's companion Ada Baker poisons the rest of the group, save one crewmember, Stefan Garner, who abandons her on the island. The rest of the crew, also affected by the Whishbloom, turn on each other, with only Stefan and his father Eleazar escaping with a map marking the Whishbloom's location. Back on land, Stefan transforms into a beast and kills Eleazar, leaving a stranger to pick up the map. On the island, Ada and Walter transform into animals.

In 1929, the map is discovered, and an expedition sets off to find the Whishbloom. Due to infighting and Walter's attempts to ward off the expedition, only three people are left alive by the time they find the Whishbloom. One of them, Myrtle Song, convinces another, Eliza Swann, to track the Whishbloom by scent. When the two find the Whishbloom, Eliza discovers a message from Walter explaining the Whishbloom's effects. Realizing Myrtle has betrayed her, Eliza shoots Myrtle and accepts her fate. The last crewmember, Jasper Wyles, departs the island, later returning to leave behind his fellow expeditioners' personal effects.

== Release ==
The Rise of the Golden Idol was first announced in development during The Game Awards in December 2023. The full game was released on 12 November 2024, for PlayStation 4, PlayStation 5, Windows, Xbox One and Xbox Series X/S, as well as for mobile platforms Android and iOS through Netflix.

Four downloadable content packs were released across 2025. The first, The Sins of New Wells, was released on March 4, 2025. The second, The Lemurian Phoenix, was released on May 13, 2025. The third, The Age of Restraint, was released on July 15, 2025. The fourth, The Curse of the Last Reaper, was released on September 23, 2025.

== Reception ==
Reception

Aggregate scores
| Aggregator | Score |
|---|---|
| Metacritic | 85/100 |
| OpenCritic | 92% recommend |

Review scores
| Publication | Score |
|---|---|
| Digital Trends | 4/5 |
| Eurogamer | 4/5 |
| GameSpot | 9/10 |
| GamesRadar+ | 4.5/5 |
| PC Gamer (US) | 87% |
| RPGFan | 70% |
| Shacknews | 9/10 |
| The Guardian | 4/5; 5/5 |
| Slant | 4/5 |
| Softpedia | 5/5 |

The Rise of the Golden Idol received "generally favorable" reviews according to review aggregator Metacritic, with the game receiving praise for its complex puzzle design, detective gameplay, and narrative. Fellow review aggregator OpenCritic assessed that the game received "mighty" approval, being recommended by 92% of critics.
