= Species-typical behavior =

Behavior characteristic of all or most individuals of a species

The ethological concept of species-typical behavior is based on the premise that certain behavioral similarities are shared by almost all members of a species. Some of these behaviors are unique to certain species, but to be 'species-typical' they do not have to be unique, they simply have to be characteristic of that species.

== Neuroscience ==
Species-typical behaviors are almost always a result of similar nervous systems and adaptations to the environment in organisms of the same species. They are created and influenced by a species' genetic code and social and natural environment. Hence, they are strongly influenced by evolution.

A classic example of species-typical behavior is breast crawl: the vast majority of human newborns, when placed on a reclined mother's abdomen, will find and begin to suckle on one of the mother's breasts without any assistance.

=== Brain structures ===
Species-typical behaviors are occasionally tied to certain structures of the brain. Murphy, MacLean, and Hamilton (1981) gave hamsters brain lesions at birth, which destroy certain brain structures. They discovered that while hamsters still expressed species-typical behavior without a neocortex, they lost much of their species-typical play and maternal behaviors when deprived of midline limbic convolutions. Likewise, if squirrel monkeys lose their globus pallidus, their ability to engage in certain sexual behavior (e.g. thigh-spreading, groin-thrusting) is either eliminated or impaired.

Scientists may also use stimulation to discover the role of a structure in species-typical behavior. In a 1957 experiment, physiologist Walter Hess used an electrode to stimulate a certain part of a resting cat's brainstem; immediately after the stimulation, the cat stood up and arched its back with erect hair—a species-typical behavior in which cats engage when frightened. The behavior lasted as long as the stimulation lasted and ended as soon as the stimulation ended. Later experiments revealed that even if the same part of the brain is stimulated with the same amount of energy for the same period, the intensity of the elicited behavior changes depending on the context. In 1973, behavioral physiologist Erich von Holst attached an electrode to one part of a chicken's brainstem. When briefly stimulated without any unusual environmental factors, the chicken was restless. When briefly stimulated in the presence of a human fist, the chicken reacted with a slightly threatening posture, and in the presence of a weasel, the chicken took a very threatening pose, with feathers bristling. The brainstem, in this case, elicits species-typical behavior that is appropriate to the surrounding environment.

=== Hormones and chemicals ===
The presence or density of certain chemical receptors on cranial structures such as the brainstem often determines their importance in one species-typical behavior or in other species. For example, monogamous prairie voles have a high density of oxytocin receptors (OTRs) in the nucleus accumbens, while non-monogamous meadow voles do not.

The manner in which hormones alter these receptors is an important behavioral regulator. For example, gonads affect OTRs in different rodents. In female rats, gonadal estrogen increases the level of OTR binding and, when the ovarian cycle maximizes the amount of estrogen in the bloodstream, causes OTRs to appear in ventrolateral regions of the structure called the ventromedial nucleus. This, in turn, increases the likelihood that a female rat will engage in certain species-typical sexual activity by increasing her sexual receptivity. But the effect of this regulatory mechanism differs between species; though a gonadectomy would decrease (and gonadal steroids would increase) sexual receptivity in the female rat, these things would have opposite impacts on female mice.

=== Instinct and experience ===
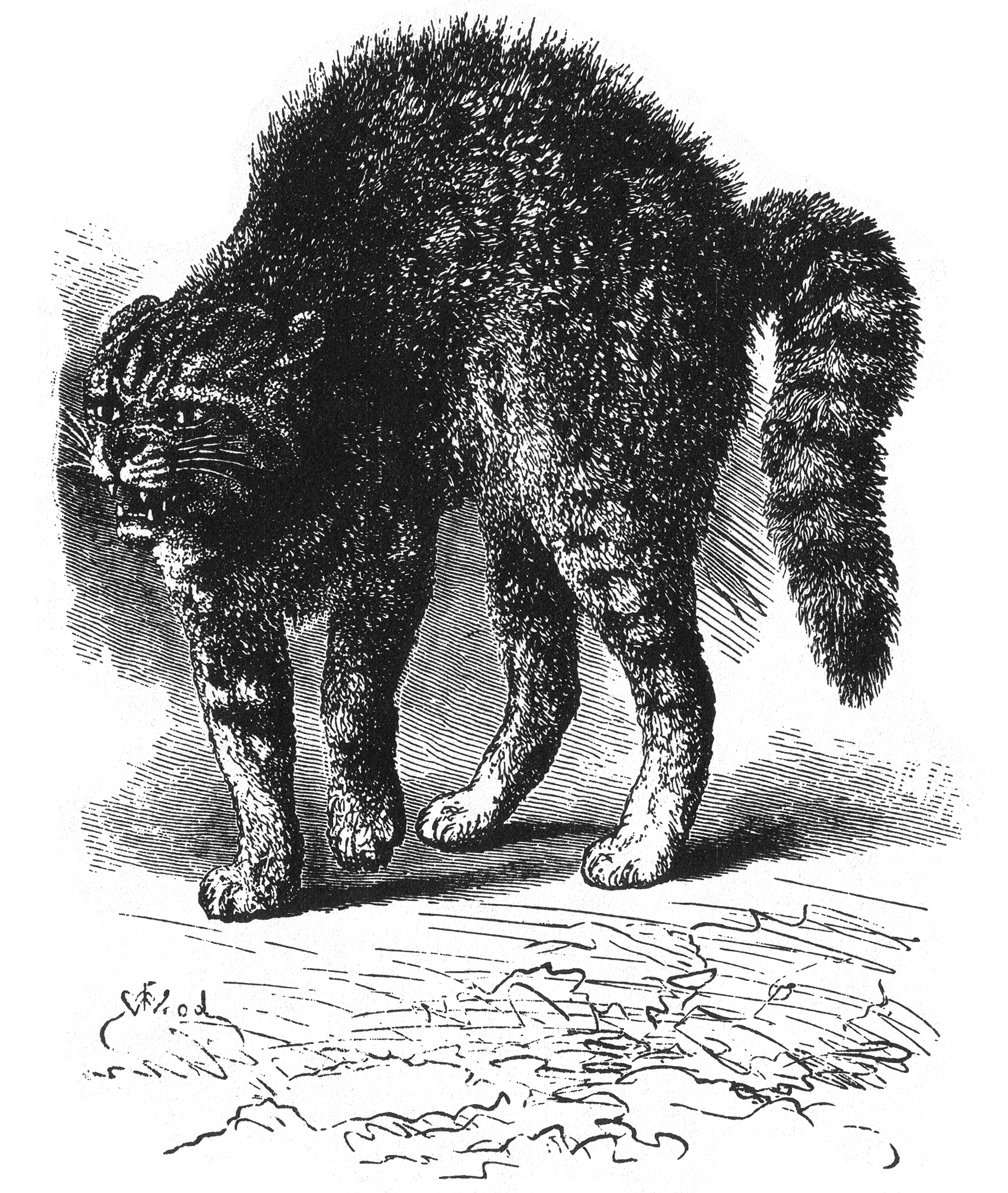
This threatening pose, illustrated here by Charles Darwin, is common among cats, but they do not learn it from one another. Instead, the perception of a certain threat activates a neural pathway with which the cat was born; the pathway causes the cat to react by arching its back, baring its teeth, and hissing. But this pre-programmed response can be altered by experience. For example, if the posture fails to deter certain threats, the cat may no longer use it in response to them.

While some species-typical behavior is learned from the parents, it is also sometimes the product of a fixed action pattern, also known as an innate releasing mechanism (IRM). In these instances, a neural network is 'programmed' to create a hard-wired, instinctive behavior in response to an external stimulus. When a blind child hears news that makes her happy, she's likely to smile in response; she never had to be taught to smile, and she never learned this behavior by seeing others do it. Similarly, when kittens are shown a picture of a cat in a threatening posture, most of them arch their backs, bare their teeth, and sometimes even hiss, even though they've never seen another cat do this. Many IRMS can be explained by the theory of evolution—if an adaptive behavior helps a species survive long enough to reproduce, such as a cat hissing to discourage an attack from another creature, then the genes that coded for those brain circuits are more likely to be passed on. A heavily studied example of a fixed action pattern is the feeding behavior of the Helisoma trivolvis (pulmonata), a type of snail. A study has shown that the intricate connections within the buccal ganglia (see nervous system of gastropods) form a central system whereby sensory information stimulates feeding in the Helisoma. More specifically, a unique system of communication between three classes of neurons in the buccal ganglia are responsible for forming the neural network that influences feeding.

A species-typical behavior can be altered by experience, as shown by experiments on Aplysia californica, a sea snail. When its gills are stimulated in a novel manner, it withdraws them into its shell for the sake of protection. This is a species-typical behavior. But after a stimulus that was once novel (e.g. a weak jet of water) has been applied repeatedly to the gills, aplysia no longer withdraws them. It has gone through habituation, a process by which the response to a stimulus becomes weaker with more exposure. This occurs because of changes in the nervous system. Neurons communicate with one another at synapses, which consist of the tip of the communicating cell (the presynaptic membrane), the tip of the receiving cell (the postsynaptic membrane), and the space in between the two (the synaptic cleft). When the presynaptic membrane is stimulated by the influx of calcium ions, it releases a chemical called a neurotransmitter, which travels over the synaptic cleft in order to bind to the postsynaptic membrane and thereby stimulate the receiving cell. During habituation, fewer calcium ions are brought into the presynaptic membrane, meaning less neurotransmitter is released, meaning that the stimulation of the receiving cell is not as strong, meaning that the action that it is supposed to stimulate will be weaker. Likewise, the number of synapses related to a certain behavior decreases as a creature habituates, also resulting in weaker reactions. And the structure of the synapse itself can be altered in any number of ways that weaken communication (e.g. decreased number of neurotransmitter receptors on the postsynaptic membrane). It is because of these processes that the species-typical behavior of aplysia was altered.

== Types ==
=== Emotional ===
These behaviors facilitated interactions between members of the same species and are central to a species' connections to the surroundings worlds. With regard to humans specifically, they are able to feel the same sorts of complex emotions that most other humans feel, and these emotions often elicit certain behaviors.

- Remorse is defined as a feeling of sadness and being sorry for something you have done. People incapable of feeling remorse are often labeled as having antisocial personality disorder (also known as dissocial personality disorder). To qualify the inability to feel or express remorse as a disorder underlines the degree to which it is species-typical. The behavioral manifestations of individuals who feel remorse range from person to person, but many individuals in a state of remorse show signs of sadness and disinhibition. They may decide to withdraw from once pleasurable activities and social interactions. An individual may become more or less likely to tell others about an action that causes remorse.
- Pride is defined as a feeling of satisfied accomplishment, and/or hubris and self-importance. People expressing pride tend to show a small smile, tilt their heads back, and even place their hands on their hips and improve posture. They also regularly choose to share their accomplishments with others. Pride - distinct from other emotions such as joy or happiness - requires a developed sense of self and is usually expressed through verbal interactions with other humans.
- Embarrassment is defined as a state of internal discomfort following a thought or action. Behavioral manifestations of embarrassment are similar to those of remorse. They often include the desire to retreat from socially intense situations where other people may remember an embarrassing incident. When alone, too, an embarrassed individual may try to avoid recollection of the incident due to feelings of shame it causes. Embarrassed individuals may also show signs of blushing due to embarrassment.

=== Feeding ===
These behaviors facilitate survival. Different species are physiologically adapted to consume different foods that must be acquired in different ways, and the manner in which they feed must correspond to these unique characteristics.

- Rodents share common species-typical feeding behaviors (also known as order-typical, since all these creatures are members of the same order, rodentia). For example, certain types of beavers, squirrels, rats, guinea pigs, hamsters, and prairie dogs all locate food by sniffing for it, grasp for food with their mouths, sit on their hindquarters to eat, and manipulate the food with their hands. But they each also have more unique feeding behaviors. For example, beavers grasp for food with their mouths, but may sometimes use a single paw to grasp and manipulate said food item. And many rodents manipulate the food with their digits in unique ways.
- A woodpecker consumes insects that can frequently be found inside trees. To access these insects, it uses a jackhammer like motion to drill into tree wood with its beak. It then reaches in and grabs the insects with its beak.
- Herons feed on aquatic creatures. In order to catch them, it wades in shallow water, searching for freshwater fish, amphibians, and the occasional reptile, and utilizing its neck and beak to spear the prey item.

=== Learning/conditioning ===
Species with complex nervous systems (esp. mammals), in addition to acting based on instinct and basic sensory stimuli, need to learn how to engage in certain activities. Because of the ways in which their nervous systems develop, they are frequently adept at learning certain behaviors at specific times in their lives.

- White-crowned sparrows are particularly adept at learning songs between the ages of fifteen and fifty days.
- A marsh wren can learn to sing over 150 bird songs, while the white-crowned sparrow can only learn a single song. Thus, the number of songs that can be sung varies between species of birds, due to relative limitations in their cognitive processing abilities.
- As the above bullet point suggests, birds have species-specific preferences for certain songs that are rooted in their genes. If a young bird is not exposed to birdsong very early in its life, but is then suddenly exposed to a variety of different bird songs, including the one typical of its species, it tends to show a preference for that one.

=== Reproduction ===
Reproduction is an activity that takes place between members of the same species. In order to interact and reproduce successfully, the members of a species must share common behaviors.

- The female fruit bat performs fellatio on a male fruit bat during copulation to increase overall copulation time. Although fellatio is a common human foreplay activity, it is less common among non-human animal species. At this point, it is unclear exactly what neurological forces motivate fruit bats to engage in fellatio during sex, although scientific researchers present various hypotheses.

But not all species-typical reproductive behaviors are about specific reproductive activity between two animals.

- Infanticide is practiced by male hippopotami, most likely in order to improve their chances of reproductive success. They tend to commit infanticide within 50 days post-parturition, especially when water sources are scarce and dominance hierarchies are challenged.

=== Sensory/motor activity ===
Different species perceive the world in different ways. The nervous systems of species develop in concert with certain anatomical features in order to produce sensory environments common to most members of that species.

- Because mantis shrimp can visually sense and process ultraviolet light, they react to it, while animals like dogs do not.
- Mayflies are able to perceive certain patterns of light polarization which suggest to them that they are above water. In response, they release their eggs, since mayfly naiads (aquatic larvae) are biologically developed to live and grow in water.
- Dogs have a scratch reflex, meaning that they reflexively scratch an irritated skin region without direction from the brain. A limb (usually their hind leg) is extended to the irritated part of the body; because this is a spinal reflex, a dog will do this even if spinal connection to the brain is severed.
- A rat tends to groom itself using the same procedure in the same order: it sits up, licks its paws, wipes its nose and then its face with its paws, and then licks the fur on its body.

=== Social activity ===
Species interact with one another, and certain species exhibit commonly held social traits.

- A panda often expresses aggressiveness by lowering its head and directing its gaze at the target of its aggression. This behavior may have developed due to the nature of the creatures that pandas tend to try to threaten—because they feel threatened by this form of intimidation, pandas regularly engage.
- Cats, ponies, lions, baboons, and many other non-human species partake in social grooming to maintain the hygiene of other individuals. Social grooming among animals can be seen as a form of conflict resolution that also builds trust among other animals who live nearby. Research has shown that grooming influences the endocrine system—it appears to be relaxing to those who participate due to the release of beta-endorphin. In addition, an increase in maternal grooming has been shown to increase the number of glucocorticoid receptors in the brains of newborn rats.

== Sources ==
- Kolb, Bryan; Whishaw, Ian Q. (2011). An Introduction To Brain and Behavior (3rd ed.). Worth Publishers. ISBN 978-1-4292-5374-1.
