= Personal grooming =

Cleaning and maintaining parts of the body

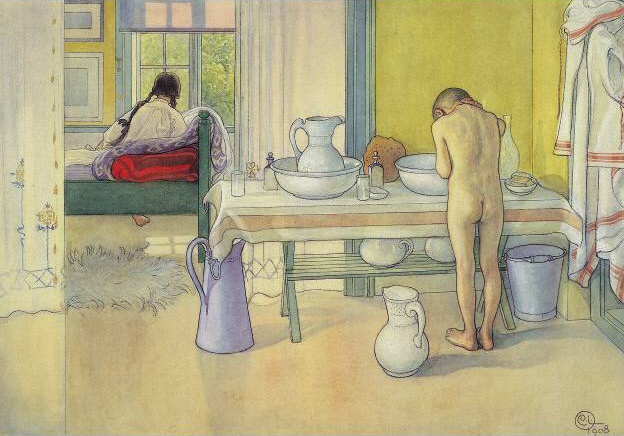
Summer Morning (at Spadarvet), by Carl Larsson, 1908

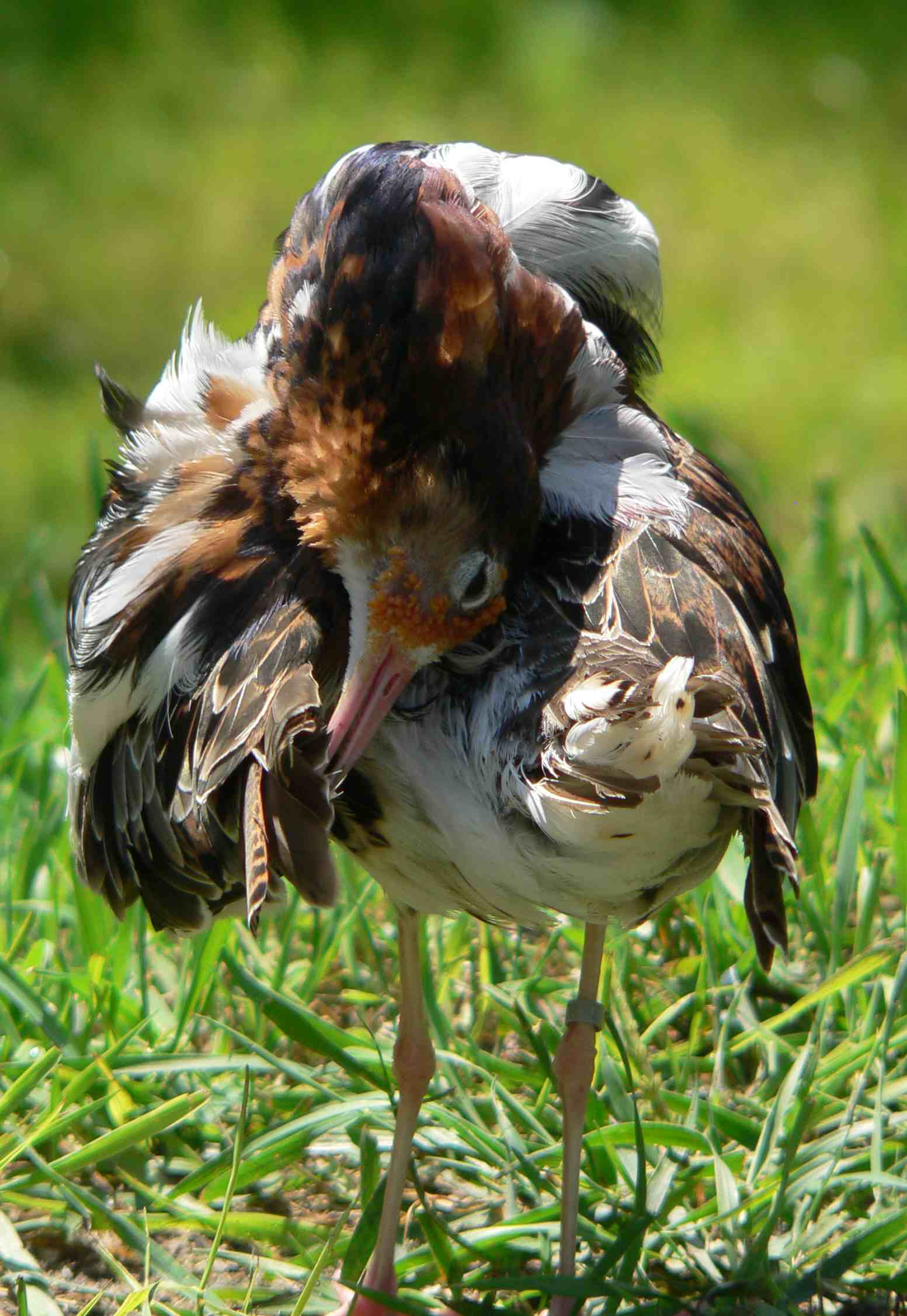
Preening male ruff

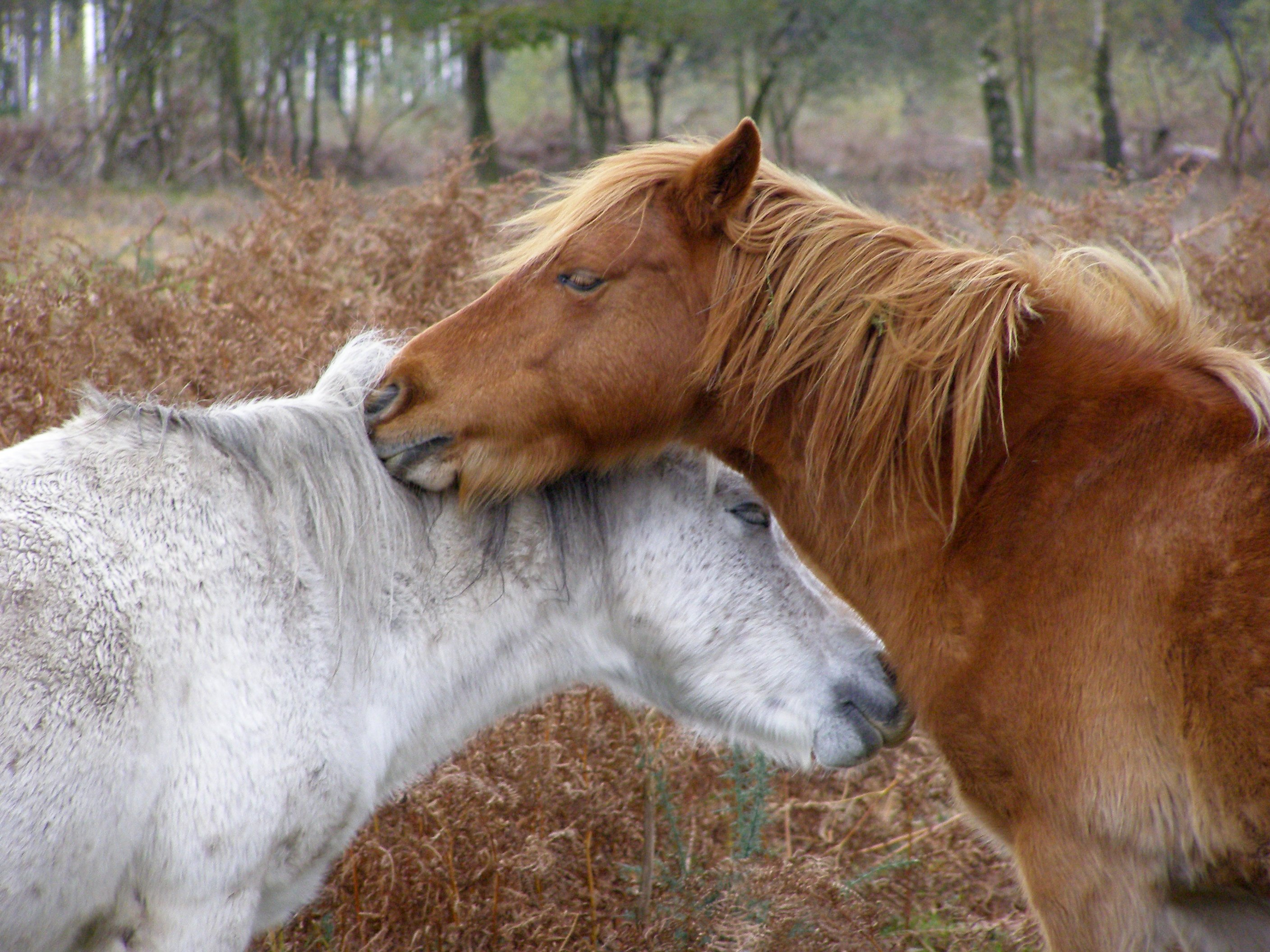
Mutually grooming ponies at Turf Hill, New Forest, U.K.

Grooming (also called preening) is the practice of cleaning and maintaining parts of the body. It is a species-typical behavior.

== In animals ==
Individual animals regularly clean themselves and put their fur, feathers or other skin coverings in good order. This activity is known as personal grooming, a form of hygiene. Extracting foreign objects such as insects, leaves, dirt, twigs and parasites is a form of grooming. Among animals, birds spend considerable time preening their feathers. This is done to remove ectoparasites, keep the feathers in good aerodynamic condition, and waterproof them. To do that, they use the preen oil secreted by the uropygial gland, the dust of down feathers, or other means such as dust-bathing or anting. During oil spills, animal conservationists that rescue penguins sometimes dress them in knitted sweaters to stop them from preening and thereby ingesting the mineral oil, which is poisonous. Monkeys may also pick out nits from their fur or scratch their rears to keep themselves clean. Cats are well known for their extensive grooming. Cats groom so often that they often produce hairballs from the fur they ingest. Many mammal species also groom their genitals after copulation. Drosophila, a genus of fly, are known to exhibit grooming behaviors that are executed in a predictable manner. Drosophila consistently begin a grooming sequence by using their front legs to clean the eyes, then the head and antennae. Using their hind legs, Drosophila proceed to groom their abdomen, and finally the wings and thorax. Throughout this sequence, Drosophila periodically rub their legs together to get rid of excess dust and debris that accumulates during the grooming process.

Grooming behaviors have been shown to be executed in a suppression hierarchy. This means that grooming behaviors that occur at the beginning of the sequence prevent those that come later in the sequence from occurring simultaneously, as the grooming sequence consists of mutually exclusive behaviors. This hierarchy does not prevent Drosophila from returning to grooming behaviors that have already been accessed in the grooming sequence. The order of grooming behaviors in the suppression hierarchy is thought to be related to the priority of cleaning a specific body part. For example, the eyes and antennae are likely executed early on in the grooming sequence to prevent debris from interfering with the function of D. melanogaster's sensory organs.

== Grooming as a social activity ==
Many social animals adapt preening and grooming behaviors for other social purposes such as bonding and the strengthening of social structures. Grooming plays a particularly important role in forming social bonds in many primate species, such as chacma baboons and wedge-capped capuchins.

== Mutual grooming in human relationships ==
In humankind, mutual grooming relates closely to social grooming, which is defined as the process by which human beings fulfill one of their basic instincts, such as socializing, cooperating and learning from each other. In research conducted by Holly Nelson (from the University of New Hampshire), individuals who chose their romantic partner reported more mutual grooming than others who focused in other types of relationships. Hence, this study hypothesized that mutual grooming related to relationship satisfaction, trust and previous experience of affection within the family. They claim that even though humans do not groom each other with the same fervor that other species do, they are groomers par excellence. Therefore, human mutual grooming plays an important role in pair bonding. In the same investigation, researchers found that individuals with more promiscuous attitudes and those who scored high on the anxiety sub-scale on an adult attachment style measure tend to groom their partners more frequently. These findings were also consistent with some of the functions of grooming: potential parental indicator, developing trust and courtship or flirtation.

A recent empirical study by Seinenu Thein-Lemelson (University of California, Berkeley) utilized an ethological approach to examine cross-cultural differences in human grooming as it pertains to caregiving behaviors. Naturalistic data was collected through video focal follows with children during routine activities and then coded for grooming behaviors. This cross-cultural comparison of urban families in Burma and the United States indicates that there are significant cross-cultural differences in rates of caregiver-to-child grooming. Burmese caregivers in the sample groomed children more often than caregivers in the United States. Additionally, children in the United States have short instances of concentrated grooming predominantly during daily activities that are structured explicitly around hygiene goals (bath time), in contrast to the Burmese child, whose grooming is distributed more evenly within and across daily activities. The Burmese parents maintained a constant vigilance with regard to risk of infection. The study is significant because it is the only study of human grooming to utilize naturalistic data.

== Gallery ==
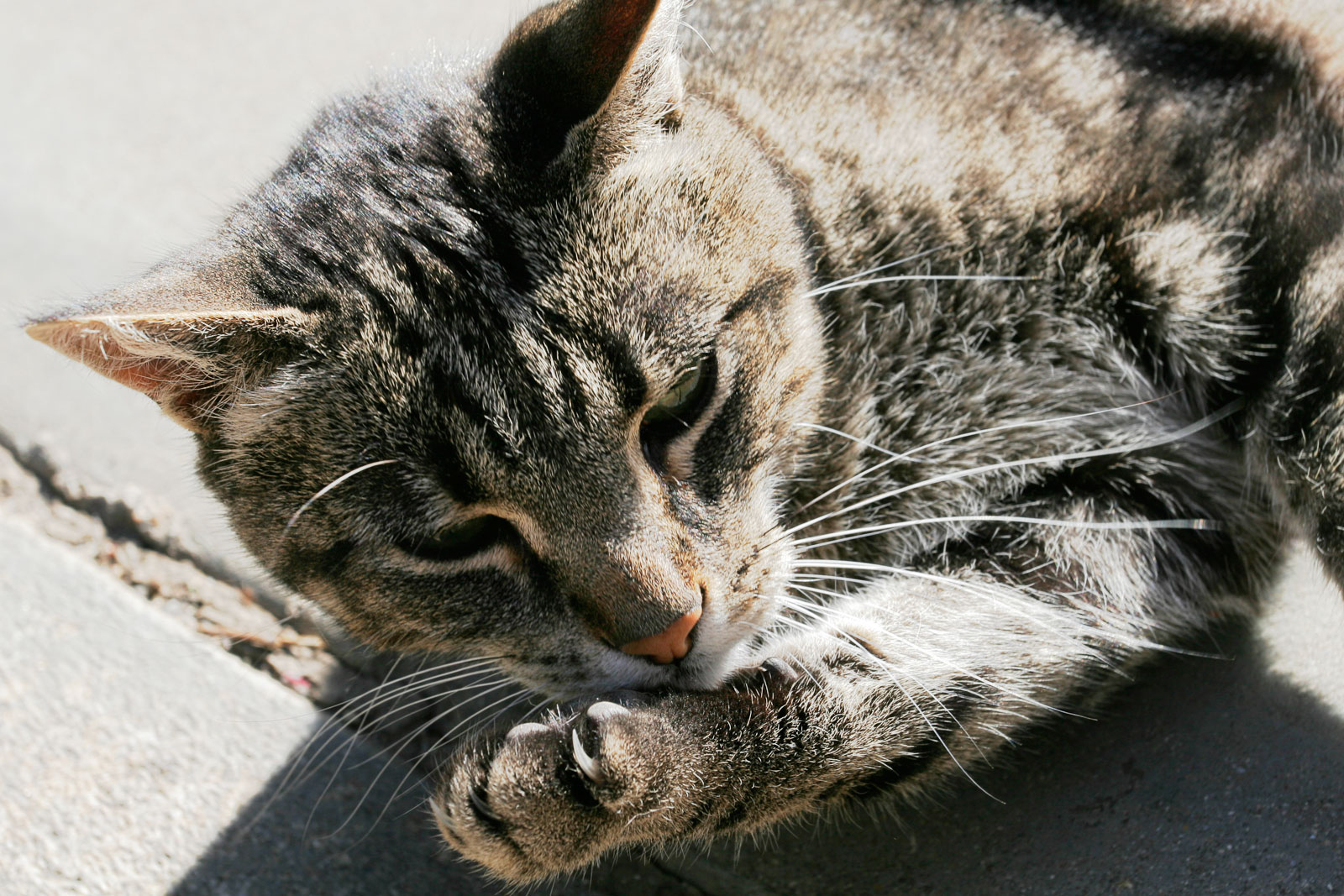
A domesticated cat grooming

A domesticated cat grooming

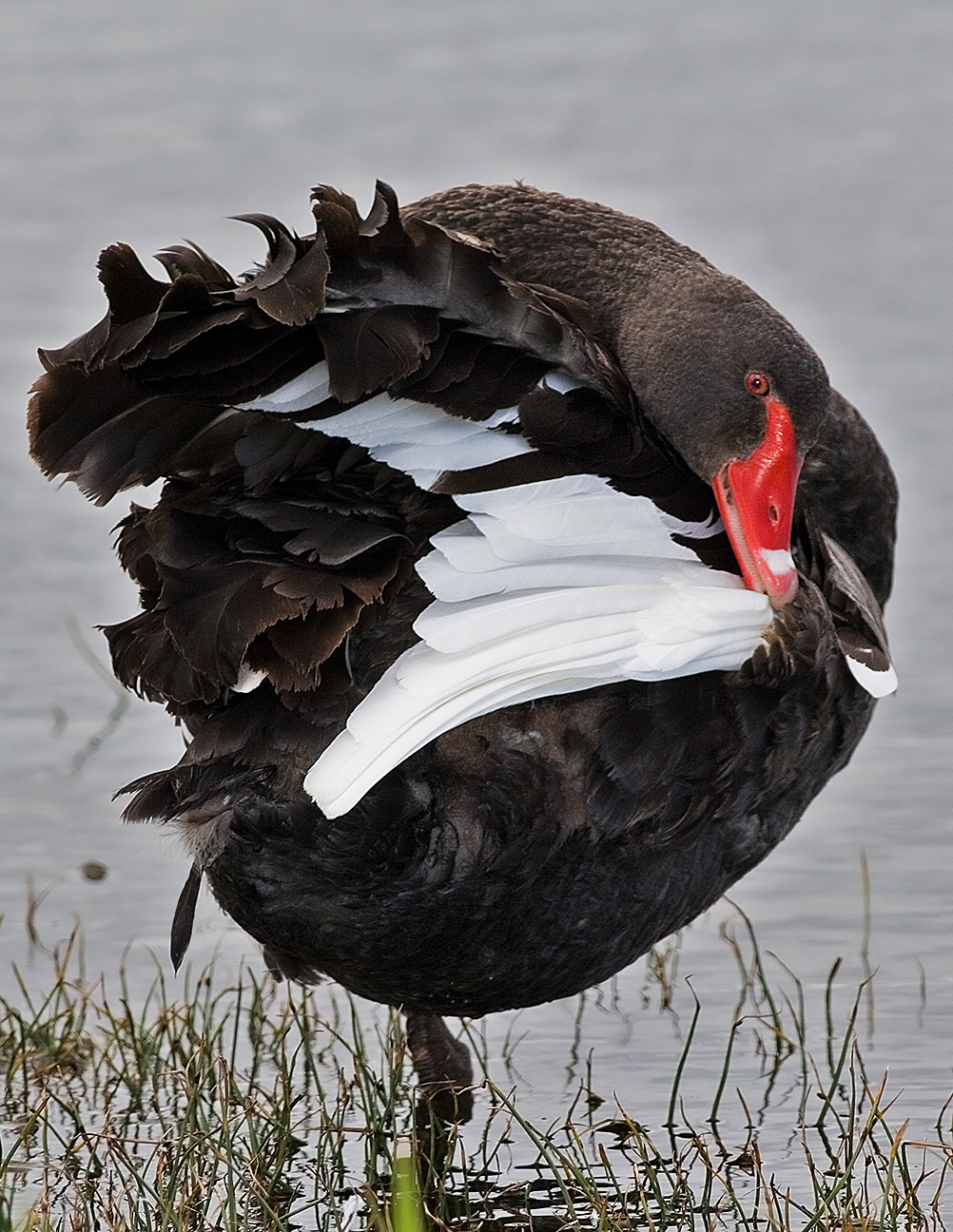
Black swan preening

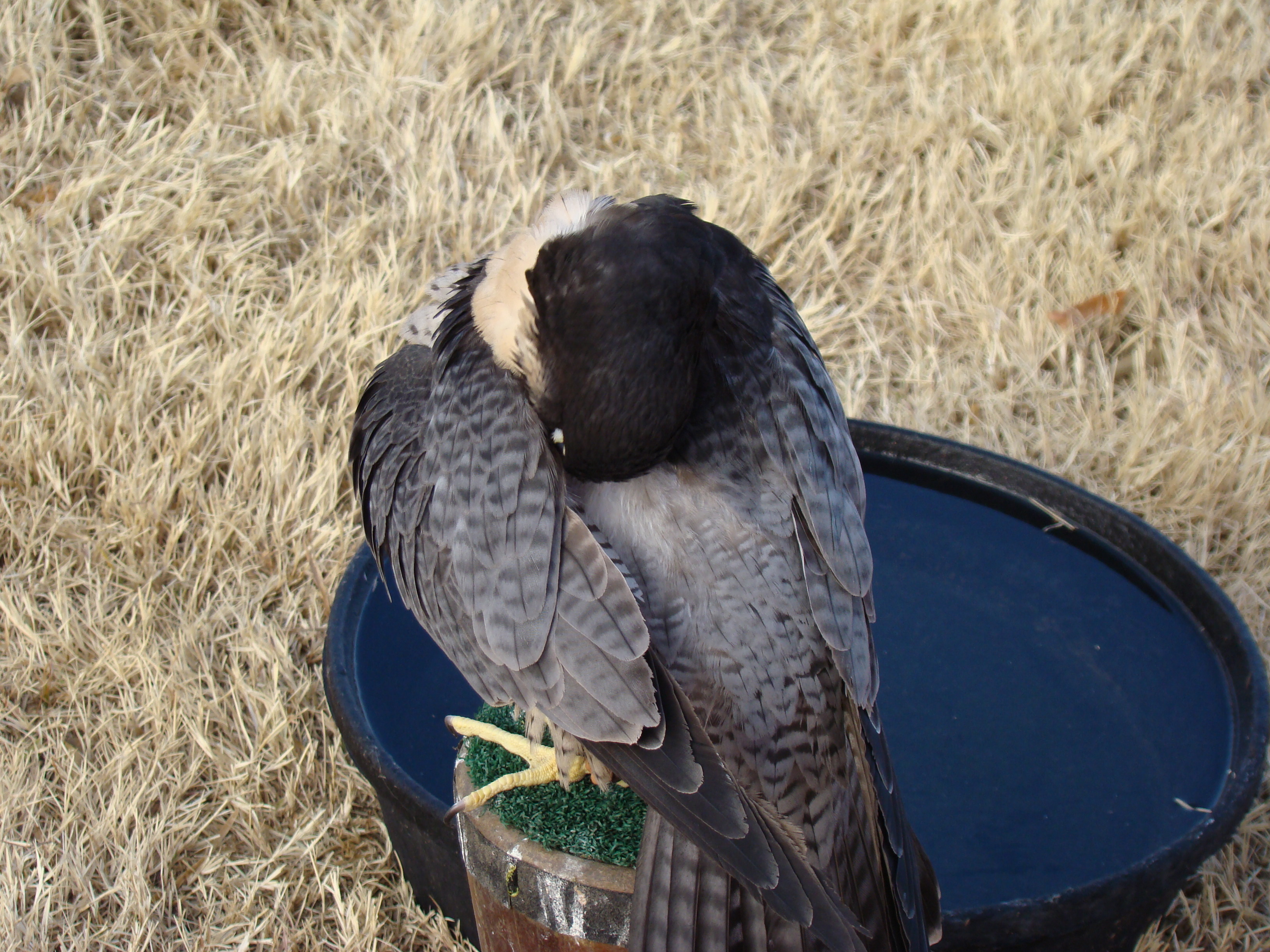
Peregrine falcon preening its feathers

A house sparrow cleans itself in moving water while a mallard preens in the background.

A flesh fly uses its legs to clean and maintain itself.

A fallow deer grooming herself

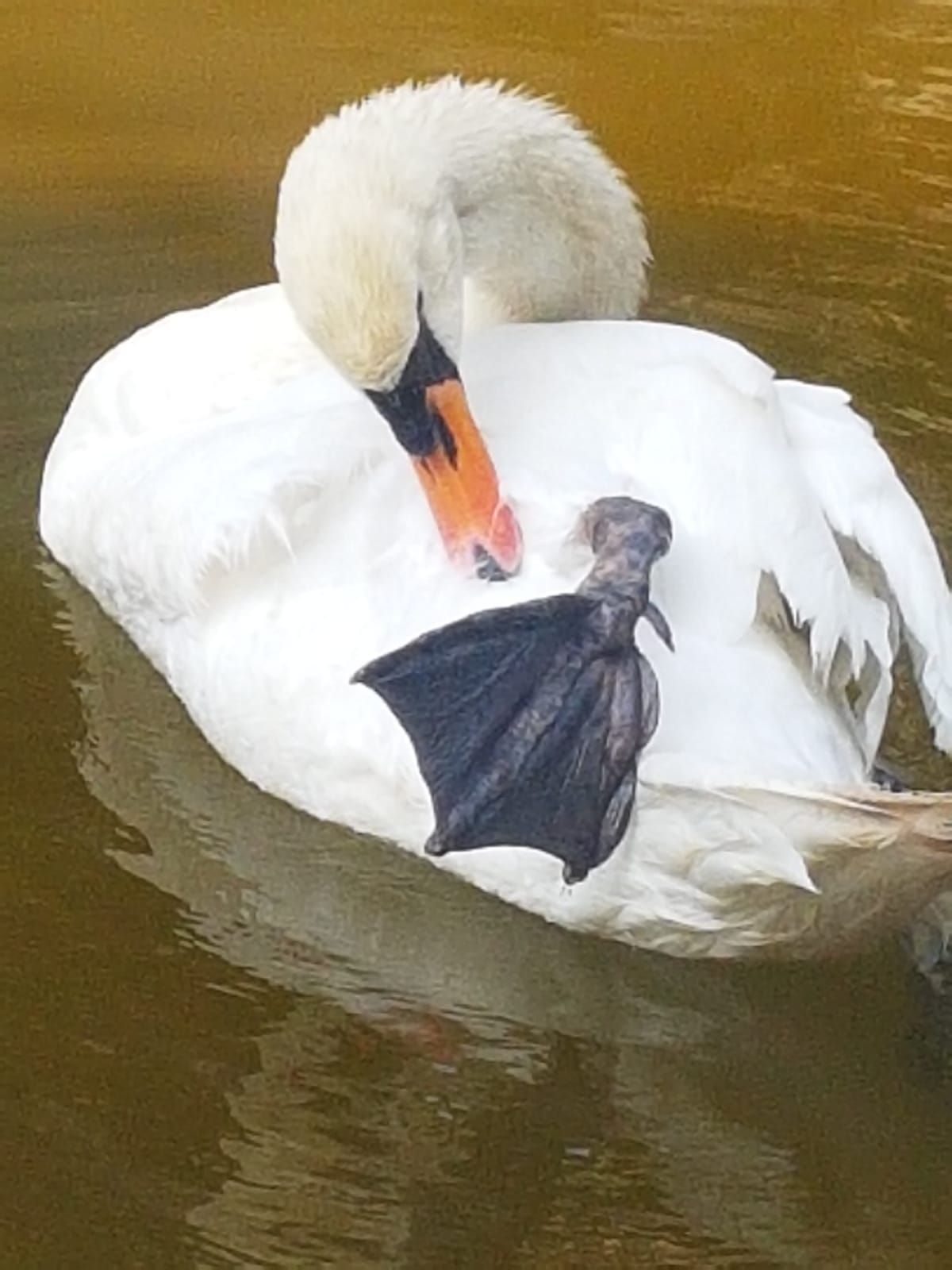
Mute swan preening

A male Southern hawker grooming himself (8x slow-motion)

== See also ==
- Comfort behaviour in animals
- Courtship display
- Dust bathing
- Self-anointing in animals
