= Snooping =

Snooping may refer to:

== Computer science ==
- Bus sniffing, also known as bus snooping
- IGMP snooping
- DHCP snooping

== See also ==
- Data-snooping bias, a concept in statistics
- Snoop (disambiguation)
- Snoopy (disambiguation)
- Sniffing (disambiguation)
