= Sniff =

Sniff may refer to:

- Sniffing (behavior), odor sampling through the nose
- Sniffle, to rapidly inhale through the nose to clear mucus (snot)
- Sniff (Moomin character), a character in the Moomin stories
- Sniff (film), a 2017 Indian Bollywood film
- Sniff (domino game), a domino game of the Fives family

== See also ==
- Sniffing (disambiguation)
