= Sniffing =

Sniffing can refer to:

- Inhalation
- Sniffing (behavior), sampling odor by inhalation of the nose
- Sniffing attack, a networking security concern

== See also ==
- Sniff (disambiguation)
