= Snoop =

Snoop may refer to:

== People with the name ==
- Snoop Conner (born 2000), American NFL player
- Snoop Dogg (born 1971), American rapper, actor, and music producer
- Snoop Minnis (born 1977), American former NFL player
- Tyler Huntley (born 1996), American NFL player; nicknamed "Snoop"
- Felicia Pearson (born 1980), American actress, rapper, author, and convicted murderer; nicknamed "Snoop", the actress who plays the eponymous character on The Wire

== Arts, entertainment, and media ==
- Snoop (The Wire), a character in the television series The Wire
- Snoop.ro, a Romanian investigative media website
- Snoop (film), an American biographical drama on Snoop Dogg

== Computing and technology ==
- Snoop (software), a utility to capture and inspect network packets, included with the Solaris operating system
- Snoop (company), a UK-based financial technology company
- Bus snooping in a microprocessor's cache coherency mechanism

== Other uses ==
- Eastern Ultralights Snoop, a family of ultralight aircraft

== See also ==
- Snooping (disambiguation)
- Snoopy (disambiguation)
