= Snoopy (disambiguation) =

Snoopy is a dog in the comic strip Peanuts by Charles M. Schulz.

Snoopy may also refer to:

- Snoopy (band), Dutch disco duo of the late 1970s
- Snoopy (artist), Quincy Delight Jones III (born 1968), a Swedish-American producer and author
- Snoopy (video game), a 1984 game by Radarsoft
- Norton Snoopy, an Australian human-powered airship
- Snoopy, Lunar Module for Apollo 10

== See also ==
- Snoop (disambiguation)
- Snooping (disambiguation)
