= Breast crawl =

Primordial movement in neonates

Breast crawl is the instinctive movement of a newborn mammal toward the nipple of its mother for the purpose of latching on to initiate breastfeeding. In humans, if the newborn is laid on its mother's abdomen, movements commence at 12 to 44 minutes after birth, with spontaneous suckling being achieved roughly 27 to 71 minutes after birth.

== Background ==
The Baby Friendly Hospital Initiative, developed by the World Health Organization and UNICEF, recommends that all babies have access to immediate skin-to-skin contact (SSC) following vaginal or Caesarean section birth. Immediate SSC after a Caesarean that used spinal or epidural anesthesia is achievable because the mother remains alert; however, after the use of general anesthesia, the newborn should be placed skin to skin as soon as the mother becomes alert and responsive.

If the mother is not immediately able to begin SSC, her partner or other helper can assist or place the infant SSC on their chest or breast. It is recommended that SSC be facilitated immediately after birth, as this is the time when the newborn is most likely to follow its natural instincts to find and attach to the breast and then breastfeed.

To find the nipple, the newborn uses a variety of sensory stimuli: visual (the sight of the mother's face and areola); auditory (the sound of its mother's voice); and olfactory (the scent of the areola, which resembles that of amniotic fluid).

== Nine stages of breast crawl ==
Newborn babies go through nine distinct stages after birth within the first hour or so:

- Birth cry: Intense crying just after birth
- Relaxation phase: Infant resting and recovering. No activity of mouth, head, arms, legs or body
- Awakening phase: Infant begins to show signs of activity. Small thrusts of head: up, down, from side-to-side. Small movements of limbs and shoulders
- Active phase: Infant moves limbs and head, is more determined in movements. Rooting activity, ‘pushing’ with limbs without shifting body
- Crawling phase: ‘Pushing’ which results in shifting body
- Resting phase: Infant rests, with some activity, such as mouth activity, sucks on hand
- Familiarization: Infant has reached areola/nipple with mouth positioned to brush and lick areola/nipple
- Suckling phase: Infant has taken nipple in mouth and commences suckling
- Sleeping phase: The baby has closed its eyes. Mother may also fall asleep.
