= Social grooming =

Behavior in social animals

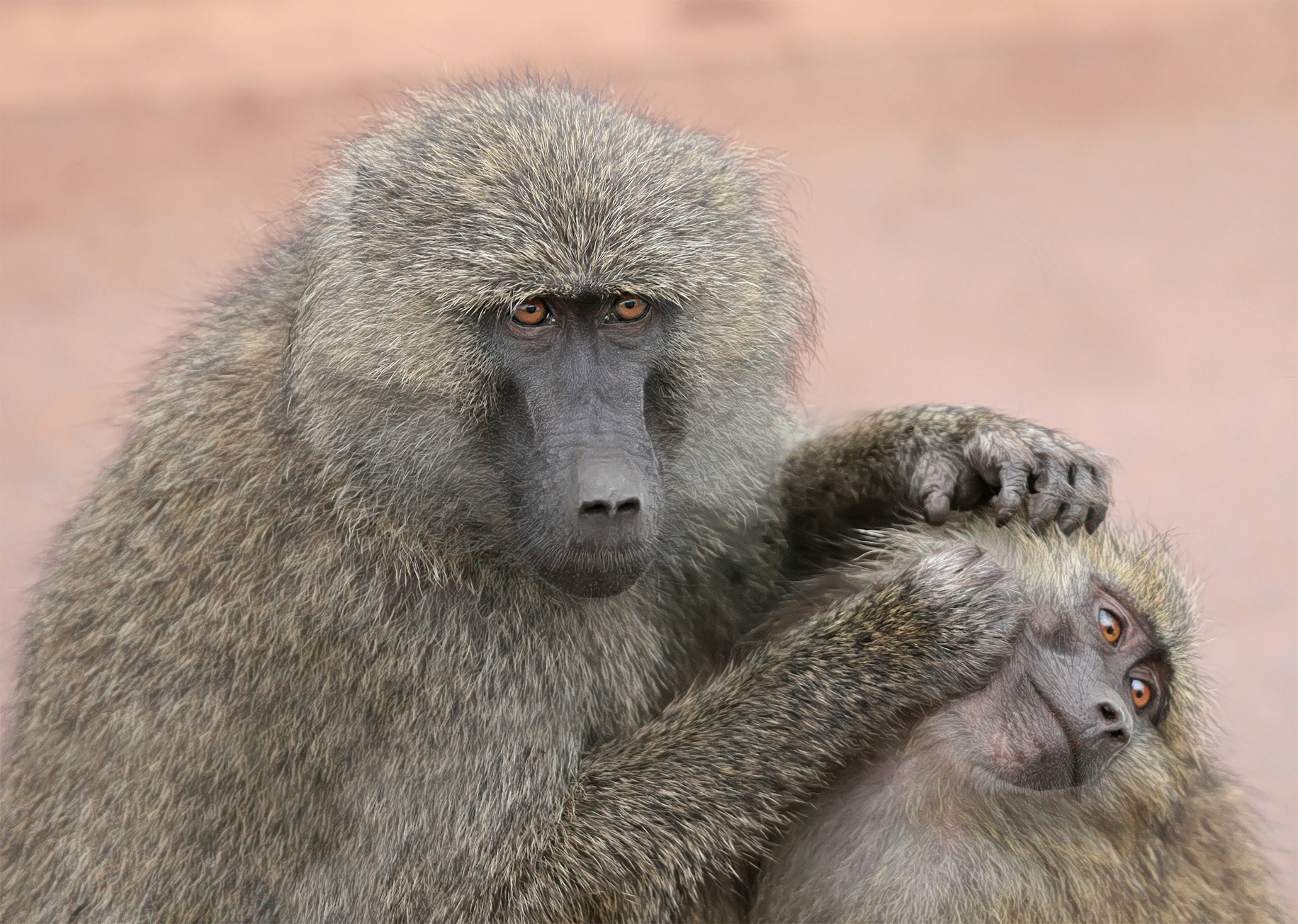
An adult olive baboon grooms a juvenile.

Two adult red wolves groom a juvenile.

A male cat grooms a female kitten.

Social grooming is a behavior in which social animals, including humans, clean or maintain one another's bodies or appearances. A related term, allogrooming, indicates social grooming between members of the same species. Grooming is a major social activity and a means by which animals that live in close proximity may bond, reinforce social structures and family links, and build companionship. Social grooming is also used as a means of conflict resolution, maternal behavior, and reconciliation in some species. Mutual grooming typically describes the act of grooming between two individuals, often as a part of social grooming, pair bonding, or a precoital activity.

== Evolutionary advantages ==
There are a variety of proposed mechanisms by which social grooming behavior has been hypothesized to increase fitness. These evolutionary advantages may come in the form of health benefits including reduction in disease transmission and stress levels, maintenance of social structures, and direct improvement of fitness as a measure of survival.

=== Health benefits ===
It is often argued as to whether the overarching importance of social grooming is to boost an organism's health and hygiene or whether the social side of social grooming plays an equally or more important role. Traditionally, it is thought that the primary function of social grooming is the upkeep of an animal's hygiene. Evidence to support this statement involves the fact that all grooming concentrates on body parts that are inaccessible by autogrooming, and that the amount of time spent allogrooming regions did not vary significantly even if the body part had a more important social or communicatory function.

Social grooming behavior has been shown to elicit an array of health benefits in a variety of species. For example, group member connection has the potential to mitigate the potentially harmful effects of stressors. In macaques, social grooming has been proven to reduce heart rate. Social affiliation during a mild stressor was shown to correlate with lower levels of mammary tumor development and longer lifespan in rats, while lack of this affiliation was demonstrated to be a major risk factor. On the other hand, it could be argued that the hygienic aspect of allogrooming does not play as important a role as the social aspect of it. Observational studies performed on 44 different primate species suggest that the number of times a species allogrooms, on average, correlates with its group size rather than with its body size. If allogrooming was required from a purely hygienic standpoint, then the larger an animal, the more and more often it would be groomed by members of its group. However, it has instead been seen that when group size increases, members ensure that they spend an appropriate amount of time grooming everyone. Hence, the fact that animals, particularly primates, groom each other more frequently than necessary from a hygienic standpoint suggests that the social aspect of allogrooming plays an equally, if not more, important role. Another point of evidence for the importance of the social aspect is that in comparison to how and how much a primate grooms itself (autogrooming), allogrooming involves longer periods of time and different techniques, some of which have connotations of being affectionate gestures.

=== Reinforcing social structure and building relationships ===
==== Creation and maintenance of social bonds ====
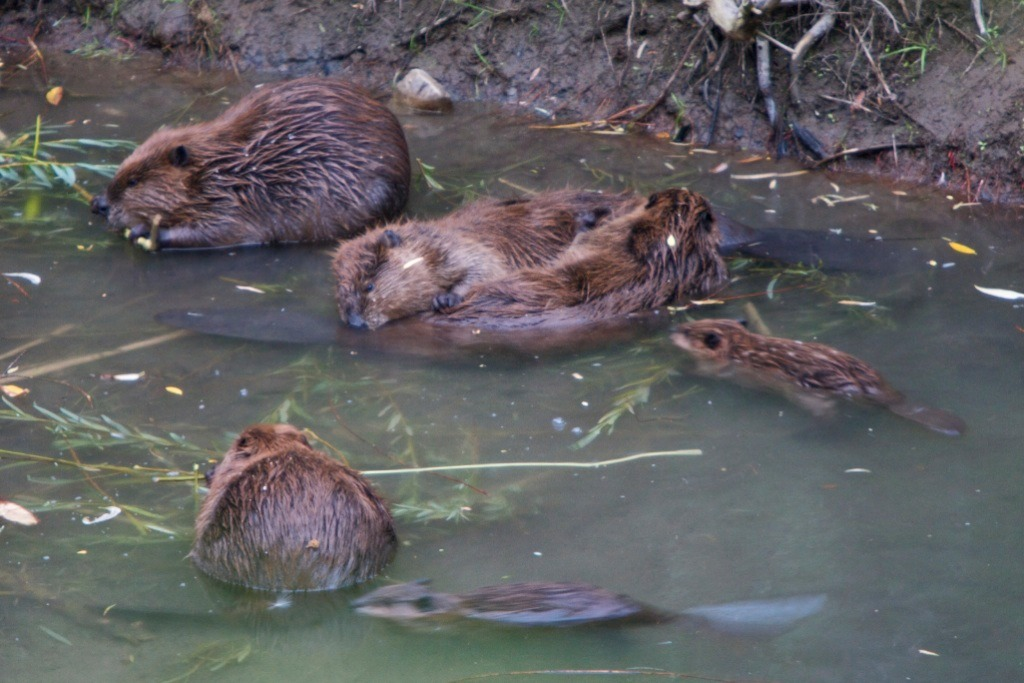
North American beaver family, with the center pair grooming one another

One of the most critical functions of social grooming is to establish social networks and relationships. In many species, individuals form close social connections dubbed "friendships" due to long periods of time spent together doing activities. In primates especially, grooming is known to have major social significance and function in the formation and maintenance of these friendships. Studies performed on rhesus macaques showed that fMRI scans of the monkeys' brains lit up more significantly at the perirhinial cortex (associated with recognition and memory) and the temporal pole (associated with social and emotional processing/analysis) when the monkeys were shown pictures of their friends' faces, compared to when they were shown less familiar faces. Hence, primates recognize familiar and well-liked individuals ("friends") and spend more time grooming them than less favoured partners. In species with a more tolerant social style, such as Barbary macaques, it is seen that females choose their grooming mates based on whom they know better rather than on social rank. In addition to primates, animals such as deer, cows, horses, voles, mice, meerkats, coatis, lions, birds, and bats also form social bonds through grooming behavior.

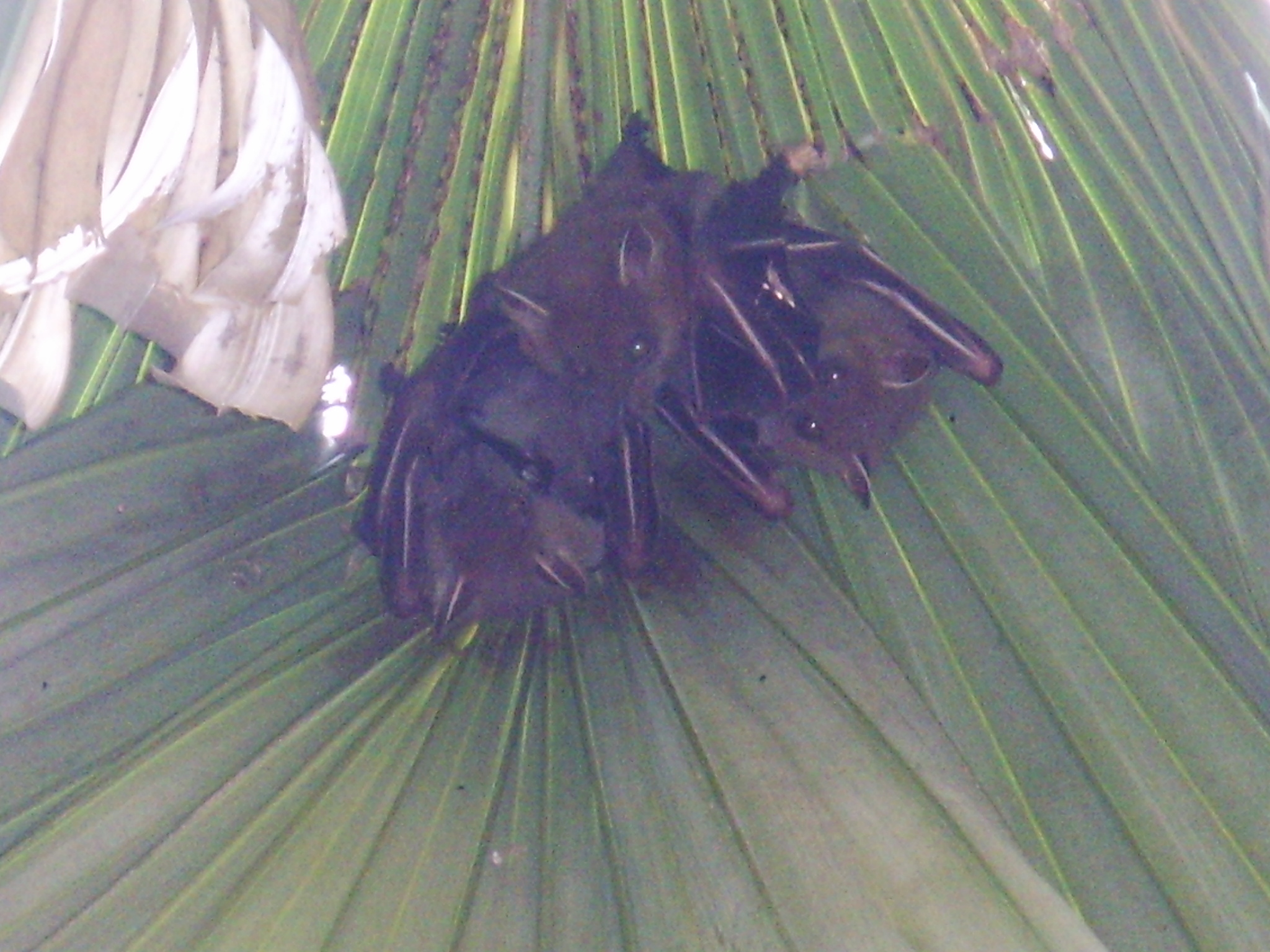
Indian short-nosed fruit bats in a tight-knit cluster

Social grooming may also serve to establish and recognize mates or amorous partners. For example, in short-nosed fruit bats, the females initiate grooming with the males just before flight at dusk. The male and his close-knit female harem release bodily secretions onto each other, which may allow them to recognize the female's reproductive status. A 2016 study by Kumar et al. chemically analyzed these secretions, concluding that they may be required in chemosensory mediated communication and mate choice. Similarly, in the less aggressive herb-field mouse, males are observed to groom females for longer durations and even allow females to not reciprocate. Since the mating demands of males are greater than those offered by females, the females use social grooming to choose mates and males use it to incite mating.

Finally, kin selection is not as important a factor as friendship or mate preference when choosing a grooming mate as previously thought. In a 2018 study of captive chimpanzees, Phelps et al. found that the animals remembered interactions that were "successful" or "unsuccessful" and used these as a basis to choose grooming mates; they chose grooming mates based on who would reciprocate rather than who would not. More importantly, if the delay between two chimpanzees grooming each other is very little, then the chimpanzees tend to "time match": i.e., the second groomer grooms the first for the same amount of time that he/she was groomed. This "episodic memory" requires a demanding amount of cognitive function and emotional recognition, and has been tested experimentally with respect to food preferences, where apes chose between tasty perishable and non-tasty non-perishable food at shorter and longer delays respectively after trying the food. Hence, apes can distinguish between different events that occurred at different times.

==== Enforcing hierarchy and social structure ====
In general, social grooming is an activity that is directed up-hierarchy—i.e., a lower ranking individual grooms a higher ranking individual in the group. In meerkats, social grooming has been shown to carry the role of maintaining relationships that increase fitness. Researchers have observed that in this system, dominant males receive more grooming while grooming others less, thereby indicating that less dominant males groom more dominant individuals to maintain relationships. In a study conducted on rhesus monkeys, it was seen that more dominant group members were "stroked" more than they were "picked at" when being groomed, compared to lower-ranking group members. From a utilitarian standpoint, stroking is a less effective technique for grooming than picking, but it is construed as being a more affectionate gesture. Hence, grooming a higher ranking individual could be done in order to placate a potential aggressor and reduce tension. Moreover, individuals closer in rank tend to groom each other more reciprocally than individuals further apart in rank.

Grooming networks in black crested gibbons have been proven to contribute to greater social cohesion and stability. Groups of gibbons with more stable social networks formed grooming networks that were significantly more complex, while groups with low stability networks formed far fewer grooming pairs.

==== Interchange of favours ====
Grooming is often offered by an individual in exchange for a certain behavioral response or action. Social grooming is critical for vampire bats especially, since it is necessary for them to maintain food-sharing relationships in order to sustain their food regurgitation sharing behavior. In Tibetan macaques, infants are seen as a valuable commodity that can be exchanged for favours; mothers allow non-mothers to handle their infants for short durations in exchange for being groomed. Tibetan macaques measure and perceive the value of the infants by noting the relative ratio of infants in the group; as the number of infants increase, their "value" decreases, and so does the amount of grooming performed by non-mothers for mothers in exchange for infant-handling.

It has been suggested that in male bonobos, grooming is exchanged in favour of some emotional component because grooming familiar individuals involves larger time differences (i.e., the duration for which each individual grooms the other is not equal) and reduced reciprocity (i.e., the likelihood of grooming the other is unpredictable). Hence, the presence of some sort of social bond between individuals results in greater "generosity" and tolerance between them.

=== Direct fitness consequences ===
Social grooming relationships have been proven to provide direct fitness benefits to a variety of species. In particular, grooming in yellow baboons (Papio cynocephalus) has been studied extensively, with numerous studies showing an increase in fitness as a result of social bonds formed through social grooming behavior. One such study, which collected 16 years of behavioral data on wild baboons, highlighted the effects that sociality has on infant survival. A positive relationship is established between infant survival to one year and a composite sociality index, a measure of sociality based on proximity and social grooming. Evidence has also been provided for the effect of sociality on adult survival in wild baboons. Direct correlations between measures of social connectedness (which focuses on social grooming) and median survival time for both female and male baboons were modeled.

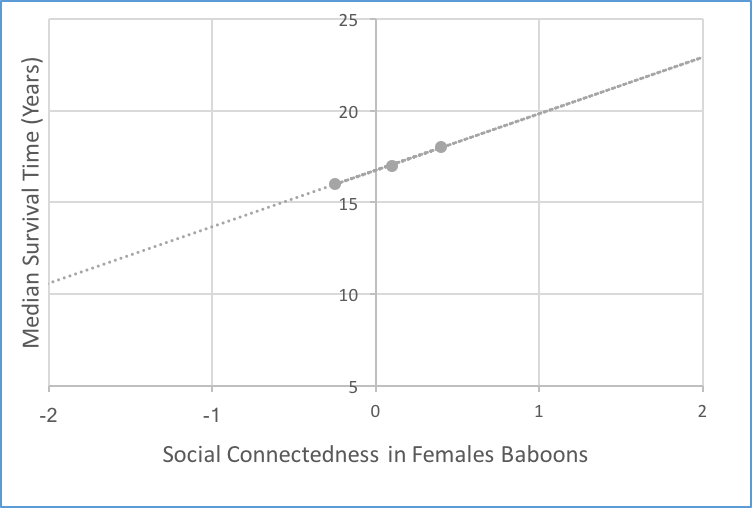
The relationship between median survival time and social connectedness in female baboons

Social bonds established by grooming may provide an adaptive advantage in the form of conflict resolution and protection from aggression. In wild savannah baboons, social affiliations were shown to augment fitness by increasing tolerance from more dominant group members and increasing the chance of obtaining aid from conspecifics during instances of within-group contest interactions. In the yellow baboon, adult females form relationships with their kin, who offer support during times of violent conflict within social groups. In Barbary macaques, social grooming results in the formation of crucial relationships among partners. These social relationships serve to aid cooperation and facilitate protection against combative groups composed of other males, which can oftentimes cause physical harm. Furthermore, social relationships have also been proven to decrease risk of infanticide in several primates.

== Altruism ==
Altruism in the biological sense refers to a behavior performed by an individual that increases the fitness of another individual while decreasing the fitness of the one performing the behavior. This differs from the philosophical concept of altruism, which requires the conscious intention to help another. As a behavior, altruism is not evaluated in moral terms, but rather as a consequence of an action for reproductive fitness. It is often questioned why the behavior persists if it is costly to the one performing it; however, Charles Darwin proposed group selection as the mechanism behind the clear advantages of altruism.

Social grooming is considered a behavior of facultative altruism—the behavior itself is a temporary loss of direct fitness (with potential for indirect fitness gain), followed by personal reproduction. This tradeoff has been compared to the Prisoner's Dilemma model, and out of this comparison came Robert Trivers' reciprocal altruism theory under the title "tit-for-tat". In conjunction with altruism, kin selection bears an emphasis on favoring the reproductive success of an organism's relatives, even at a cost to the organism's own survival and reproduction. Because of this, kin selection is an instance of inclusive fitness, which combines the number of offspring produced with the number an individual can ensure the production of by supporting others, such as siblings.

=== Hamilton's rule ===
$rB>C$

Developed by W.D. Hamilton, this rule governs the idea that kin selection causes genes to increase in frequency when the genetic relatedness (r) of a recipient to an actor multiplied by the benefit to the recipient (B) is greater than the reproductive cost to the actor (C). Thus, it is advantageous for an individual to partake in altruistic behaviors, such as social grooming, so long as the individual receiving the benefits of the behavior is related to the one providing the behavior.

=== Use as a commodity ===
It has been questioned whether some animals are instead using altruistic behaviors as a market strategy to trade for something desirable. In olive baboons, Papio anubis, it has been found that individuals perform altruistic behaviors as a form of trade in which a behavior is provided in exchange for benefits, such as reduced aggression. The grooming was evenly balanced across multiple rather than single bouts, suggesting that females are not constrained to complete exchanges with single transactions and use social grooming to solidify long-term relationships with those in their social groups.

In addition, white-handed gibbon (Hylobates lar) males were more attentive to social grooming during estrus of the females in their group. Though the behavior of social grooming itself was not beneficial to the one providing the service, the opportunity to mate and subsequent fertilization increases the reproductive fitness of those participating in the behavior. This study also found that social grooming performance cycled with that of the females ovarian cycle, similar to a courting behavior.

== Ontogeny of social grooming ==
=== General learning and reciprocation of allogrooming ===
In most cases, allogrooming is an action that is learned from an individual's mother. Infants are groomed by their mothers and mimic these actions on each other and the mothers as juveniles. This action is reciprocated on other group members (non-mother or of a different rank) more often once the individual is a fully developed adult and can follow normal grooming patterns.

=== Sex-based differences in learning ===
Male and female members of a species may differ in learning how, when, and whom to groom. In stump-tailed macaques, infant females mimic their mothers' actions by grooming their mothers more often than their male counterparts do and by grooming the same group members that their mothers groom. This mimicry is suggested to indicate identification-based observational learning in infant stump-tailed macaques, and the daughters' penchants for maternal mimicry and kin-biased grooming versus the sons' penchants for rank-biased grooming falls in line with their social roles in groups, where adult males require alliances in order to gain and maintain rank.

== Tool usage ==
In nearly all instances of social grooming, individuals use their own body parts, such as hands, teeth, or tongue, to groom a group member or infant. It is very rare to observe instances of tool usage in social grooming in non-human animals; however, a few such instances have been observed in primates. In a 1981 observational study of Japanese macaques at Bucknell University, a mother macaque was seen to choose a stone after observing several stones on the ground, and then use this stone to groom her infant. It was hypothesized that the stone was used as a distractor for the infant so that the mother could adequately clean him while his attention was occupied elsewhere. This was supported by the fact that the infant picked up the stone once the mother dropped it and allowed her to groom him while he played with it. This behavior was seen in a few other members of the colony, but not seen throughout the species. In another instance, a female chimpanzee at the Delta Regional Primate Research Center created a "toothbrush" by stripping a twig of its leaves, and used this toothbrush to groom her infant over several instances. However, both examples concern tool use in primates, which is already widely studied and scientifically backed. The wide working memory capacities and causal understanding capabilities of primates permit them to fashion and utilize tools far more extensively than other non-human animals. Apart from physical and mental constraints, perhaps a reason allogrooming animals do not use tools is because a major purpose of social grooming is social bonding and involves emotional exchanges, much of which is conveyed by touch.

== Mutual grooming ==
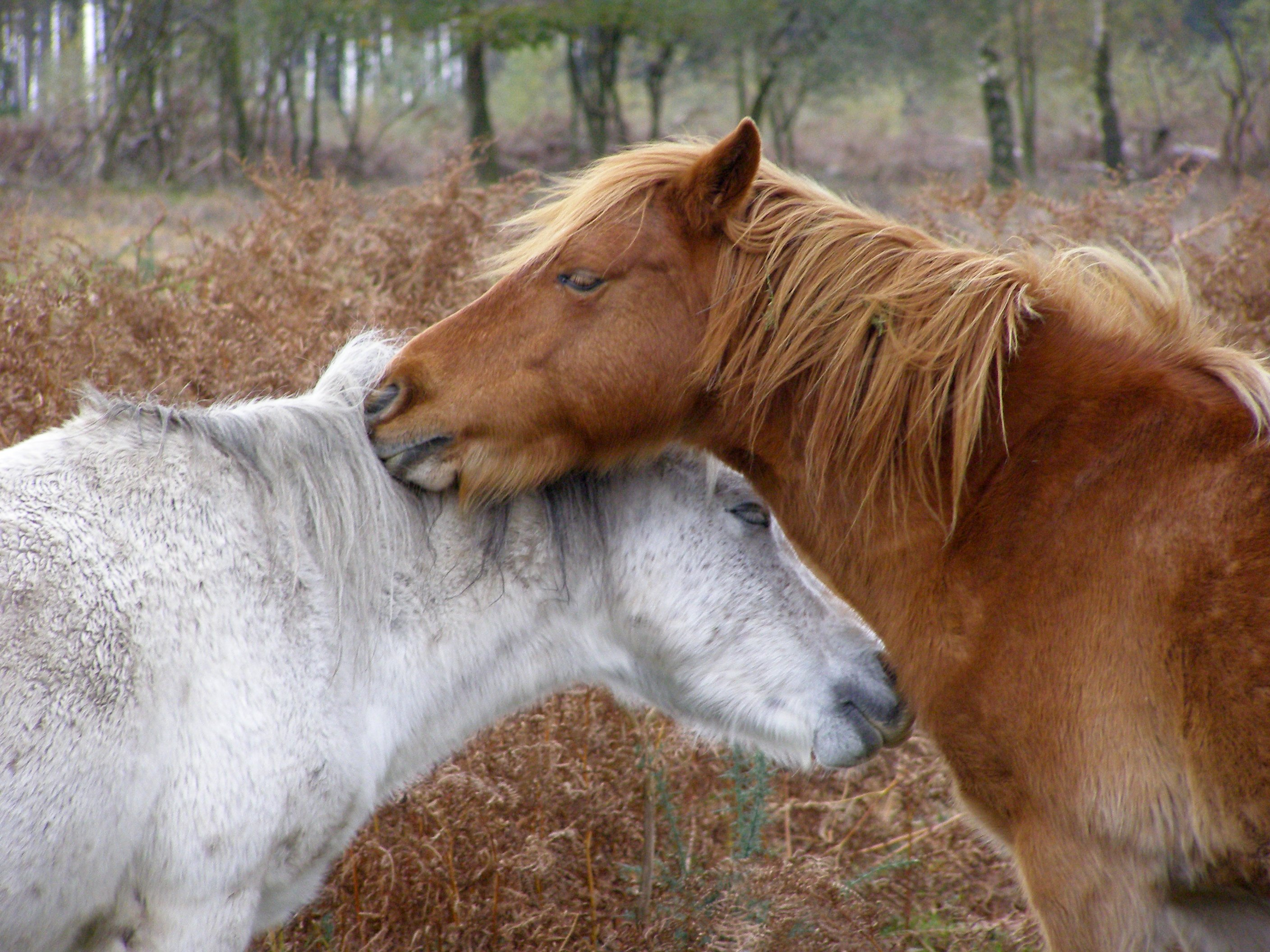
Mutual grooming in ponies

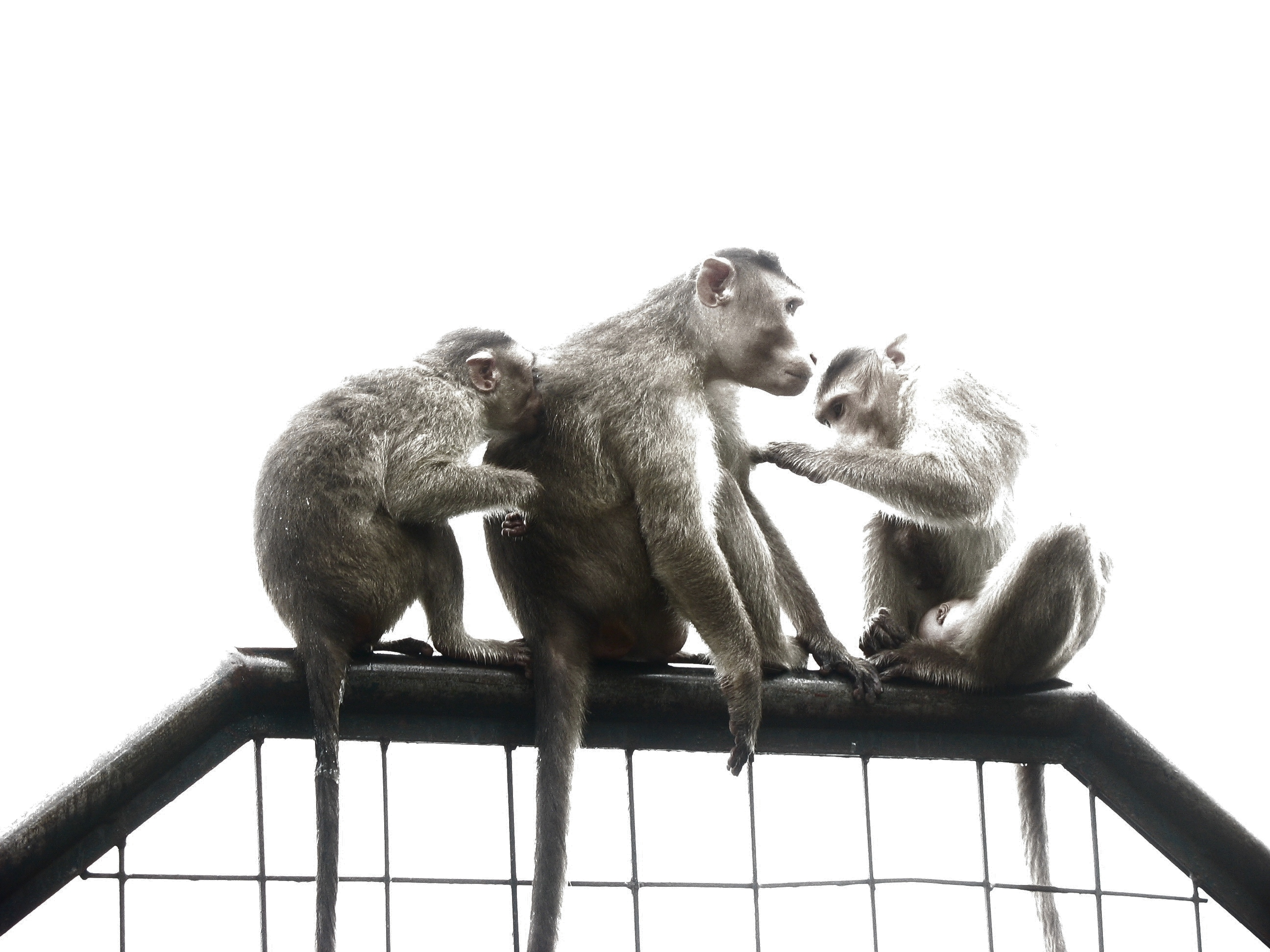
Three macaques grooming one another

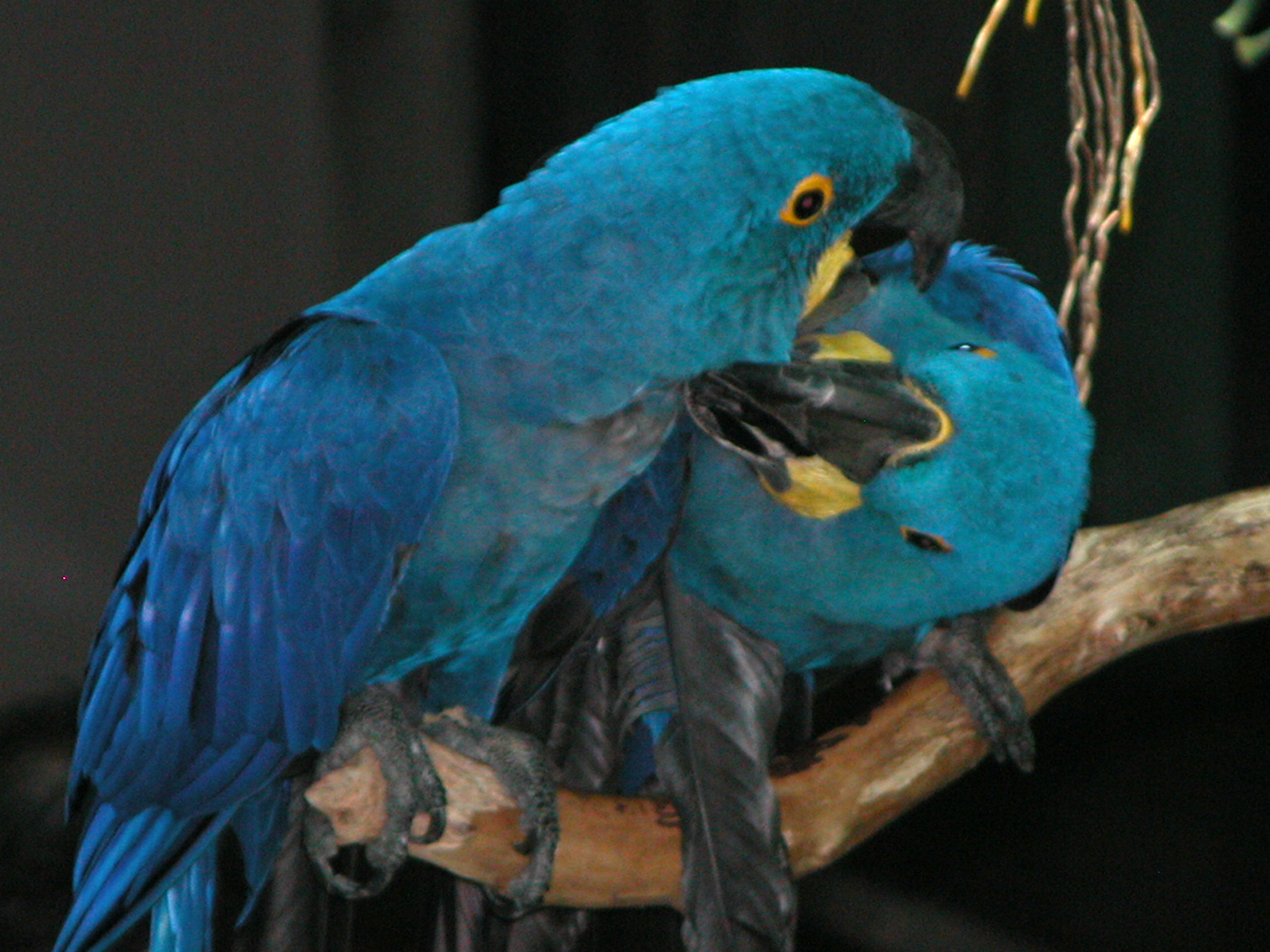
Social grooming in hyacinth macaws

Female budgerigar preening the male (video)

One lion grooming another

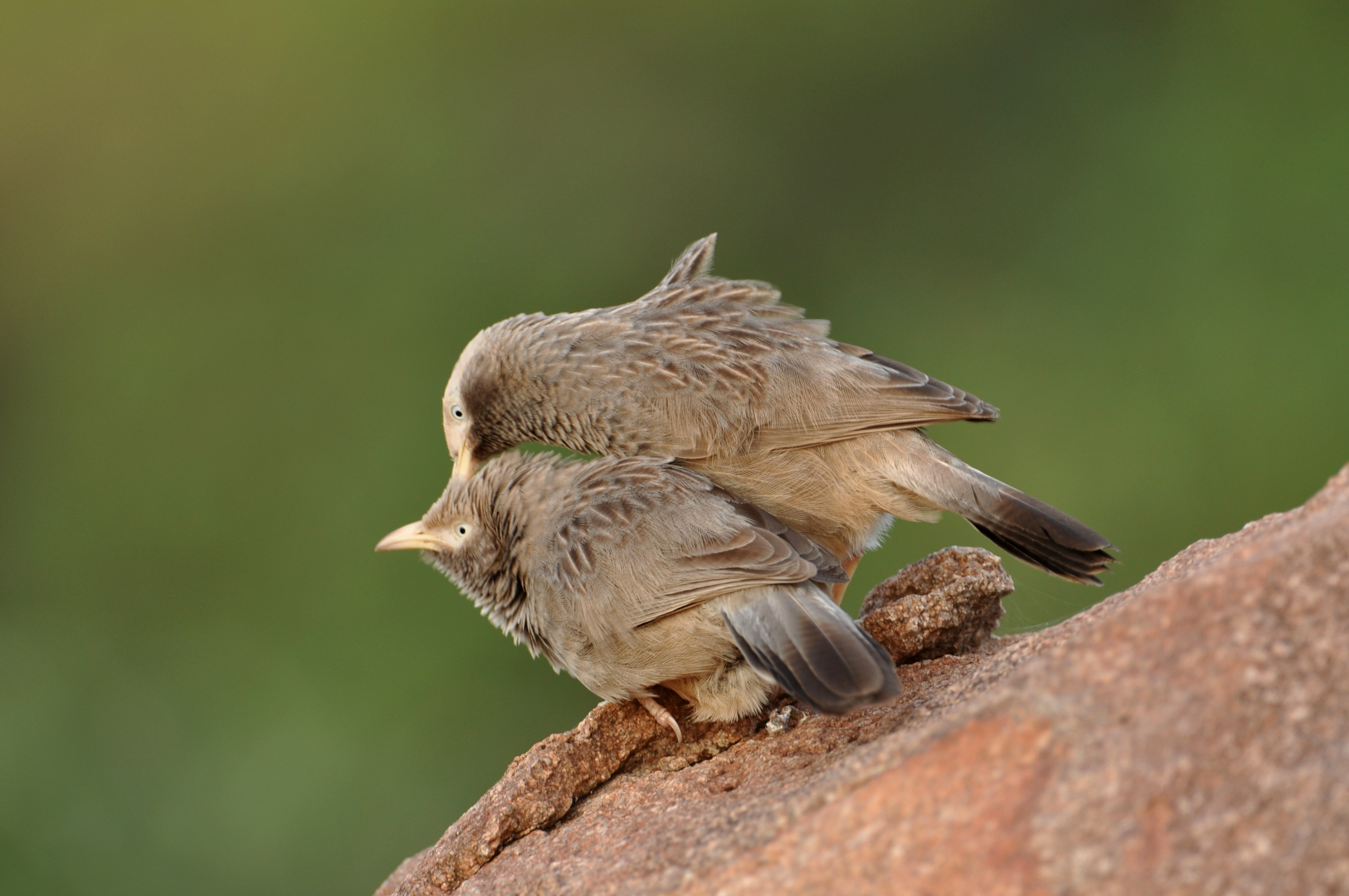
Allopreening in yellow-billed babbler

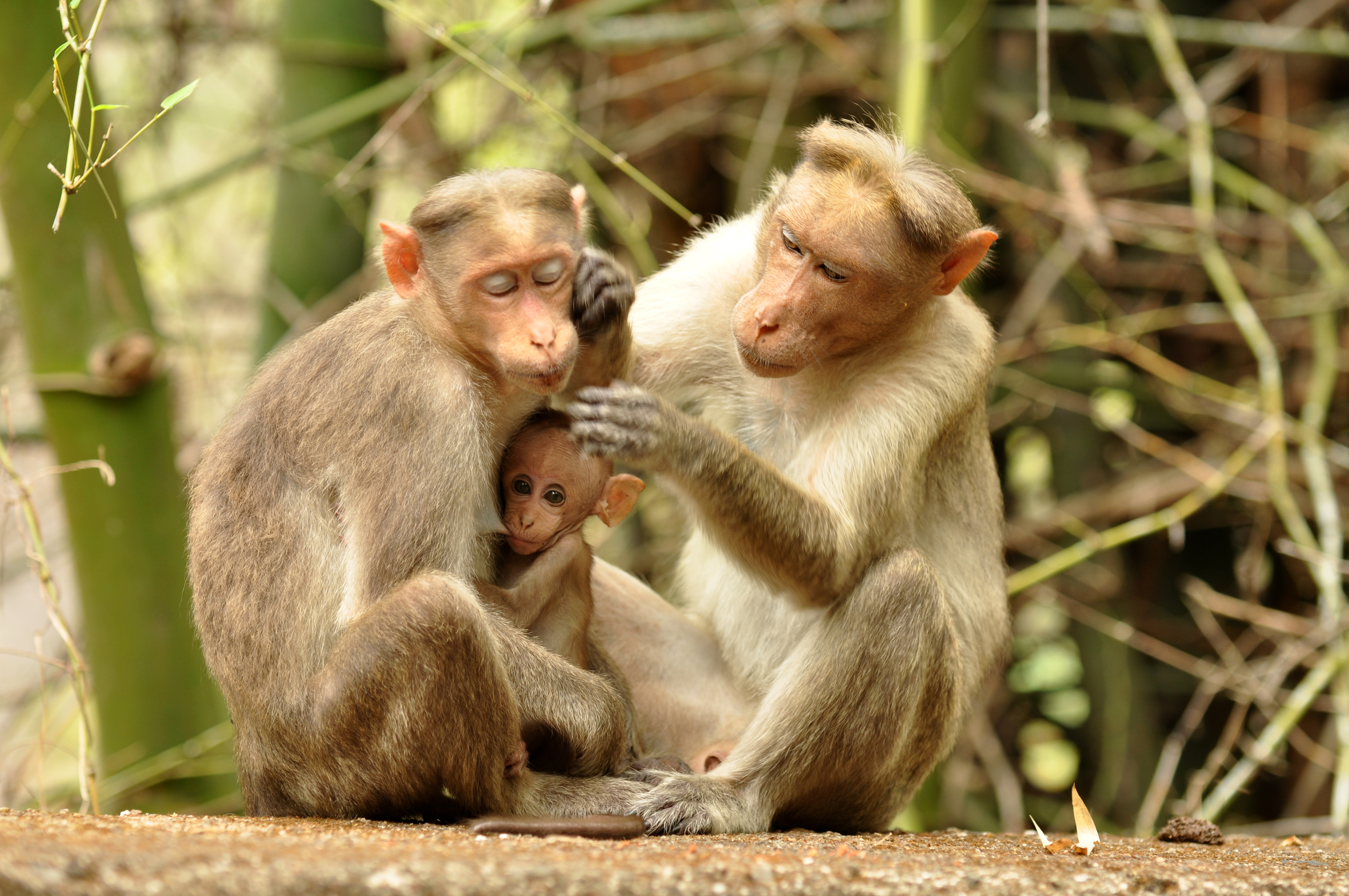
Bonnet macaque allogrooming while infant suckles

Many animals groom each other in the form of stroking, scratching, and massaging. This activity often serves to remove foreign material from the body to promote the communal success of these socially active animals. There exists a wide array of socially grooming species throughout the animal kingdom, including primates, insects, birds, and bats. While thorough research has yet to be conducted, much has been learned about social grooming in non-human animals via the study of primates. The driving force behind mammalian social grooming is primarily believed to be rooted in adaptation to consolatory behavior as well as utilitarian purposes in the exchange of resources such as food, sex, and communal hygiene.

=== Insects ===
In insects, grooming often performs the important role of removing foreign material from the body. The honey bee, for example, engages in social grooming by cleaning body parts that cannot be reached by the receiving bee. The receiving bee extends its wings perpendicular to its body while its wings, mouth parts, and antennae are cleaned in order to remove dust and pollen. This removal of dust and pollen allows for the sharpening of olfactory senses, thus contributing to the overall well-being of the group.

=== Bats ===
Recent studies have determined that vampire bats engage in social grooming much more than other types of bats to promote the well-being of the group. Facing higher levels of parasitic infection, vampire bats engage in cleaning one another as well as sharing food via regurgitation. This activity prevents ongoing infection while also promoting group success.

=== Primates ===
Japanese macaques (Macaca fuscata) grooming each other at the Jigokudani Monkey Park in Yamanouchi

Primates provide perhaps one of the best examples of mutual grooming, due to the intensive research performed regarding their varying lifestyles and the direct variation in the means of social grooming across different species. Among primates, social grooming plays a significant role in animal consolation behavior, whereby the primates engage in establishing and maintaining alliances through dominance hierarchies and pre-existing coalitions, and for reconciliation after conflicts. Primates groom socially in moments of boredom as well, and the act has been shown to reduce tension and stress. This reduction in stress is often associated with observed periods of relaxed behavior, and primates have been known to fall asleep while receiving grooming. Conflict among primates has been observed by researchers as increasing stress among the group, making mutual grooming very advantageous.

There are benefits to initiating grooming. The one that starts the grooming will in return be groomed themselves, getting the benefit of being cleaned. Research has found that primates lower on the social ladder may initiate grooming with a higher-ranking primate in order to increase their own position. It has been found that in times of higher conflict and competition, this is less likely to occur. Researchers have suggested that primates may see a need to balance the uses of grooming, swapping between its use as a means to increase social standing and its use as a means to keep oneself clean.

Grooming in primates is not only utilized for alliance formation and maintenance, but to exchange resources such as communal food, sex, and hygiene. Wild baboons have been found to utilize social grooming as an activity to remove ticks and other insects from others; in this grooming, the body areas receiving significant attention appear to be the regions where the baboons themselves cannot reach. Grooming activity in these regions is used to remove parasites, dirt, dead skin, and tangled fur in order to help keep the animal's health in good condition despite the individual's inability to reach and clean certain areas.

The time primates spend grooming increases with group size, but too-large group sizes can lead to decreased group cohesion because time spent grooming is usually impacted by other factors, which include ecological, phylogenetic, and life history. For example, the article states, "Cognitive constraints and predation pressure strongly affect group sizes and thereby have an indirect effect on primate grooming time". By analyzing past data and studies done on this topic, the authors found that a primate group greater than 40 will face greater ecological problems and, thus, time spent during social grooming is affected.

Recent studies regarding chimpanzees have determined the direct correlation of the release of oxytocin to consolatory behavior. This behavior, as well as release, has been noted in primates such as the Vervet monkey, a primate species that actively engages in social grooming from early childhood to adulthood. Vervet monkey siblings often have conflicts over grooming allocation by their mother, yet grooming remains an activity that mediates tension and is low cost for alliance formation and maintenance. This grooming occurs both between siblings and between mother and child.

Recent studies of crab-eating macaques have shown that males will groom females in order to procure sex. One study found that a female has a greater likelihood of engaging in sexual activity with a male if he has recently groomed her, compared to males who have not.

=== Birds ===
Birds engage in allopreening, which researchers believe builds pair bonds. In 2010, researchers determined the existence of a form of social grooming as a consolation behavior within ravens via a form of bystander contact, whereby observer ravens would act to console a distressed victim via contact sitting, preening, and beak-to-beak touching.

=== Horses ===
Horses engage in mutual grooming via the formation of "pair bonds" where parasites and other contaminants on the surface of the body are actively removed. This removal of foreign material is primarily performed on hard-to-reach areas, such as the neck, via nibbling.

=== Cattle ===
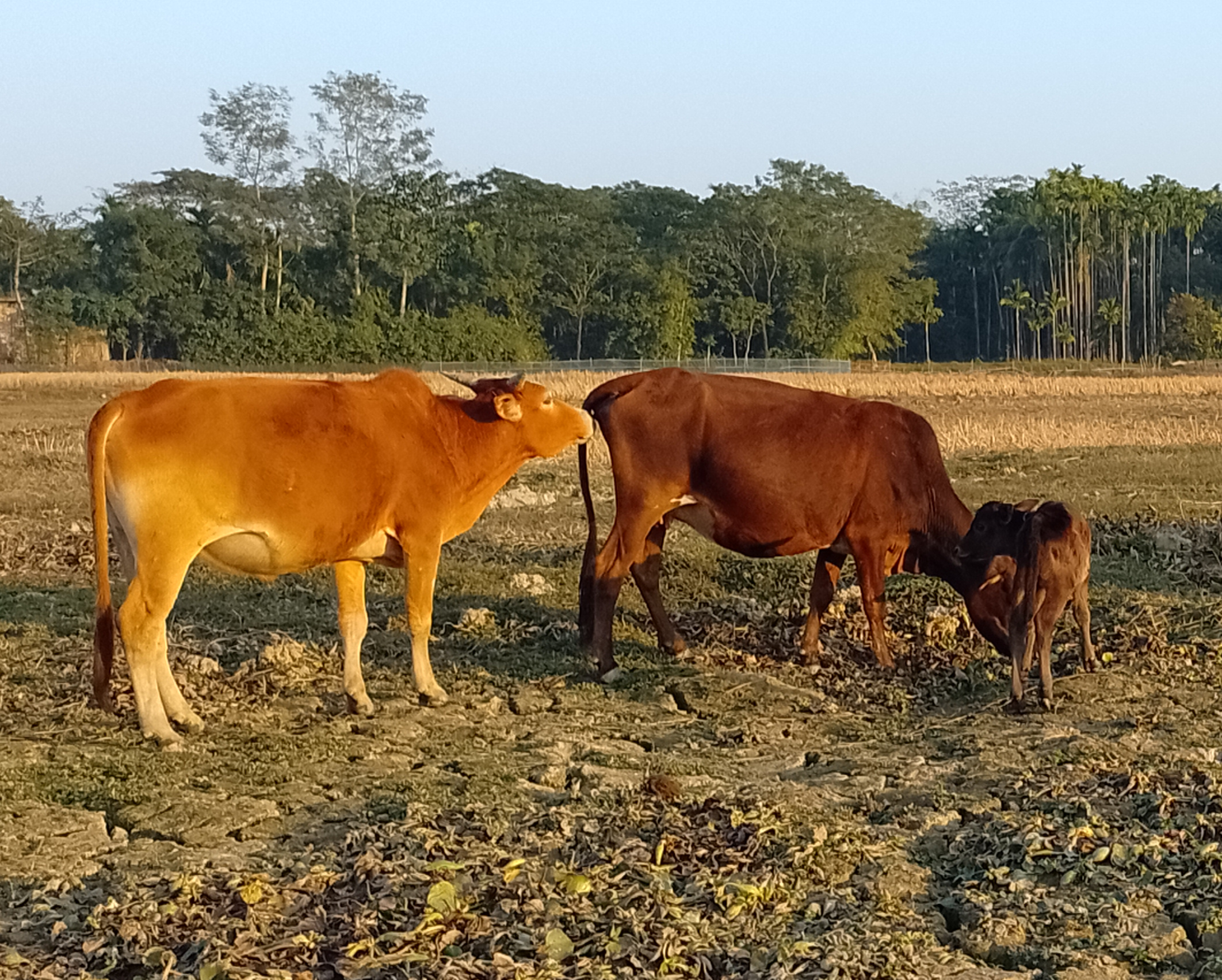

Allogrooming is a behavior commonly seen in many types of cattle, including dairy and beef breeds. The act of social licking can be seen specifically in heifers to initiate social dominance, emphasize companionship and improve hygiene of oneself or others. This behavior seen in cows may provide advantages including reduced parasite loads, social tension, and competition at the feed bunk. It is understood that social licking can provide long-term benefits such as promoting positive emotions and a relaxed environment.

== Endocrine effects ==
Social grooming has been shown to be correlated with changes in endocrine levels within individuals. Specifically, there is a large correlation between the brain's release of oxytocin and social grooming. Oxytocin is hypothesized to promote prosocial behaviors due to its positive emotional response when released. Further, social grooming also releases beta-endorphins which promote physiological responses in stress reduction. These responses can occur from the production of hormones and endorphins, or through the growth or reduction in nerve structures. For example, in studies of suckling rats, rats who received warmth and touch when feeding had lower blood pressure levels than rats who did not receive any touch. This was found to be the result of an increased vagal nerve tone, meaning they had had a higher parasympathetic nervous response and a lower sympathetic nervous response to stimuli, resulting in a lower stress response. Social grooming is a form of innocuous sensory activation. Innocuous sensory activation, characterized by non-aggressive contact, stimulates an entirely separate neural pathway from nocuous aggressive sensory activation. Innocuous sensations are transmitted through the dorsal column-medial lemniscal system.

=== Oxytocin ===
Oxytocin is a peptide hormone known to help express social emotions such as altruism, which in turn provide a positive feedback mechanism for social behaviors. For example, studies of vampire bats have shown that the intranasal injection of oxytocin increases the amount of allogrooming done by female bats. The release of oxytocin, found to be stimulated by positive touches (such as allogrooming), smells, and sounds, can provide physiological benefits for the individual; these benefits can include relaxation, healing, and digestion stimulation. Reproductive benefits have also been found: studies in rats have shown that the release of oxytocin can increase male reproductive success. Oxytocin plays an important role in maternal pair bonding, and is hypothesized to promote similar bonding in social groups as a result of positive feedback loops from social interactions.

=== Beta-endorphins ===
Grooming stimulates the release of beta-endorphins, which is one physiological reason for the relaxing effect of grooming. Beta-endorphins are found in neurons in the hypothalamus and the pituitary gland. Beta-endorphins are found to be opioid agonists. Opioids are molecules that act on receptors to promote feelings of relaxation and reduce pain. A study in monkeys found that the changes in opiate expression in the body, mirroring changes in beta-endorphin levels, influences desire for social grooming. When injected with opiate receptor blockades, which decrease the level of beta-endorphins, monkeys were observed to respond with an increased desire to be groomed; conversely, the monkeys' desire to be groomed reduced significantly when they were given morphine. However, beta-endorphin levels are difficult to measure in animal species—in contrast to oxytocin, which can be measured by sampling cerebrospinal fluid—and therefore they have not been linked as strongly with social behaviors.

=== Glucocorticoids receptors ===
Glucocorticoids are steroid hormones that are synthesized in the adrenal cortex and are a part of the group of corticosteroids. Glucocorticoids are involved in immune function, and are a part of the feedback system that reduces inflammation. They are also involved in glucose metabolism. Studies in macaques have shown that increased social stress results in glucocorticoid resistance, further inhibiting immune function. Macaques who participated in social grooming showed decreased levels of viral load, which points toward decreased levels of social stress resulting in increased immune function and glucocorticoid sensitivity. Additionally, a 1997 study concluded that an increase in maternal grooming resulted in a proportionate increase in glucocorticoid receptors on target tissue in the neonatal rat. In the study on neonatal rats, it was found that the receptor number was altered due to a change in both serotonin and thyroid-stimulating hormone concentrations. An increase in the number of receptors might influence the amount of negative feedback on corticosteroid secretion and prevent the undesirable side effects of an abnormal physiologic stress response. Social grooming can change the number of glucocorticoid receptors, which can result in increased immune function.

Studies have also shown that male baboons who participate more in social grooming show lower basal cortisol concentrations.

Faecal glucocorticoid (fGCs) is a hormone metabolite associated with stress that is seen to be present in lower levels in female baboons with stronger, well-established grooming networks. When potentially infanticidal male baboons immigrate into a group, the females' fGC levels are seen to rise, indicative of higher stress; however, females with reliable and well-established grooming partners have less of a fGC rise than those with weaker grooming networks. Hence, the social support received from a "friendship" aids baboons in stress management. Similarly, fGC levels are also seen to rise in females when a close "friend" dies; however, these rising fGC levels are seen to decrease in females that form new grooming partners, replacing their deceased friends.

=== Opioids ===
Endogenous opioids are chemical molecules produced in the brains of organisms that serve to create feelings of relaxation, happiness, and pain relief. In primates, laughter and social grooming trigger opioid release in the brain, which is thought to form and maintain social bonds. In a study performed on rhesus monkeys, lactating females with 4- to 10-week-old infants were given low doses of naloxone, an opioid antagonist that blocks the opioid receptor and inhibits the effects of endogenous opioids. In comparison to the control females, who were given saline solutions, the naloxone females groomed their infants and other members of their group less. The naloxone females were also observed to be less protective of their young, which is uncharacteristic of new mothers. This decline in social interactions upon naloxone injection suggests that opioid antagonists interfere with maternal involvement in social actions—here, social grooming. it could therefore be hypothesized that higher levels of opioids in new rhesus mothers cause increased levels of social involvement and maternal behavior, aiding the development and learning of the newborn.

== Criticism for studies quoted ==
Above all, the main criticism regarding studies concerning social grooming is that almost all of them focus on primates, and a narrow range of species within primates themselves. As a result, the literature does not provide a well-rounded idea of what the cognitive or behavioral basis for social grooming is, nor does it completely outline all of its effects, positive or negative. Even in well-studied species, it may be that not all the data relevant to social grooming has been collected. Secondly, data for most species is derived based on the members of a single group. In primates, whose behavior is highly flexible depending on the socio-environmental conditions, this poses a particular challenge. Thirdly, most studies are short-term and observational, so the direct link between social grooming and fitness or mate choice outcomes cannot be studied directly as in long-term direct or captive studies.

== See also ==
- Cleaner fish
- Cleaning symbiosis
- Community cohesion
- Licking
- Personal grooming
- Group cohesiveness
