= List of animal sounds =

List of common words used to describe animal noises and their audio recordings

Certain words in the English language represent animal sounds: the noises and vocalizations of particular animals, especially noises used by animals for communication. The words can be used as verbs or interjections in addition to nouns, and many of them are also specifically onomatopoeic.

== List of animal sounds ==
Picture	Animal	Description	Audio recording
	Alligator	bellow, hiss	Alligator bellow
	Alpaca	alarm call, cluck/click, hum, orgle, scream	
	American woodcock	meep, peent (birders)	American woodcock
	Antelope	snort	Impala
	Australian magpie	quardle-oodle-ardle-wardle-doodle	
Image of European badger (Meles Meles)	Badger	growl	Badger
	Bat	screech, squeak, eek	Bats
	Bear	roar, growl	Bear cub growl
Bäver närbild	Beaver	grunting, sighing, gnawing, whining, tooth chattering, hissing	
	Bee	buzz	Hummel bee Xylocopa pubescens (carpenter bee) offsprings
	Big cat (Tiger, Lion, Jaguar, Leopard)	roar, growl, snarl	Tiger growl Jaguar making a content "sawing" sound.
	Bison	bellow, moo, low	
	Camel	grunt	
Image of a capybara eating hay	Capybara	squeak, chatter, bark	
	Cat	mew, meow, purr, hiss, trill, chirp, chatter, caterwaul, growl, mrrp, nya	Cat meow Domestic cat purring
	Cattle	moo, low	
	Chicken	cluck, buck, crow cha-caw, bah-gawk (female) cock-a-doodle-doo (male)	Rooster crowing
	Chinchilla	squeak	
	Cicada	chirp	Cicada
	Coyote	yip, howl, yelp, whine, growl, huff, bark	
	Crab	chirp, click, creak	
	Crane	trumpet, bugle	
	Cricket	chirp	Cricket
	Crocodile	hiss, growl	
	Crow	caw, cah	Black Crow
	Curlew	pipe	
	Deer	bellow, bell (buck), bleat (doe, fawn)	Red deer
	Dog	arf, bark, boof, bay, howl, growl, snarl, moan, whine, whimper, yelp, scream, sigh, sneeze, woof, yip, yap	Dog bark
	Dolphin	click, whistle, squeal	Dolphins calling
	Donkey	hee-haw, bray	Domestic donkey brays
	Duck	quack	Mallard Duck
	Eagle	screech	Bald Eagle
	Elephant	trumpet, snort, rumble, growl, roar	Elephant trumpet
	Elk	bugle (male), bleat (calves)	Elk bellow
	Ferret	dook, hiss, squeak	
	Fish	brrp, click, blub, glub, honk	
	Fly	buzz	Bombylius major
	Fox	bark, scream, howl, snore, yip, yap, yop, gecker	Fox scream
	Frog	croak, ribbit, chirp	Pacific tree frog
	Gaur	low, moo	
	Giraffe	bleat, hum	Giraffe hum
	Goat	bleat, maa	Herd of goats bleating
	Goose	honk, hiss	Geese Honking
	Gorilla	hoot, belch, roar	
	Grasshopper	chirp	Grasshoppers chirping
	Guinea pig	wheek, purr	
	Hamster	squeak	
	Hawk	screech	Hawk screeching
	Hermit crab	chirp	
	Hippopotamus	growl, grunt, snort	
	Hornet	buzz	Hummel bee
	Horse	neigh, whinny, nicker, hoofbeats (clip-clop)	
	Hyena	laugh, whoop	Spotted Hyena
	Jackal	gecker	Black-backed jackal
	Koala	bellow, shriek	
	Laughing kookaburra	laugh	
	Lemur	chatter, whoop	
	Leopard	roar, growl, snarl	
	Linnet	chuckle	
	Lion	roar, growl, snarl	Lion roar
	Lizard	hiss	
	Locust	chirp	
	Lovebird	chirp, squack, caw, ca-dih, bababa, bahp	
	Magpie	chatter	Magpie
	Meerkat	bark	
	Monkey	scream, chatter, gecker, howl	Mantled Howler Monkey (Alouatta palliata)
	Moose	bellow	
	Mosquito	buzz, whine	
	Mouse	squeak	Pitched down to audible frequency
	Okapi	cough, bellow	
	Opossum	click, growl, hiss	
	Owl	hoot, hiss, caterwaul (barred owls), twit twoo (tawny owls)	Great horned owl
	Ox	low, moo	
	Parrot	squawk, talk	White-capped Parrot Rose-ringed Parakeet imitating human speech
	Peacock	scream, squawk, honk	Peacock
	Penguin	chirp, honk, trumpet, bray	King penguins
	Pig	oink, snort, squeal, grunt	Pig
	Pigeon	coo	Wood pigeon
	Prairie dog	bark	
	Quail	call	Call of a male common quail
	Rabbit	chirp, squeak, scream	Rabbit
	Raccoon	trill	Baby Raccoon Chatter
	Rat	squeak	
	Raven	caw, cronk	Common Raven
	River otter	blow, chatter, chirp, creek, grunt, hiccup, hiss, scream, squeak, swish, whine, whistle, chatterchirp, purr	
	Rook	caw	
	Seal	bark	New Zealand fur seal
	Seagull	squawks	
	Sheep	bleat, baa, maa, meh (lambs)	Sheep
	Snake	hiss, rattle	Rattlesnake
	Songbird	chirrup, chirp, tweet, sing, warble (larks / warblers / wrens), twitter (sparrows)	Goldfinch
	Squirrel	squeak	
	Swan	cry, trumpet, bugle	Trumpeter swan
	Tapir	squeak	
	Tokay gecko	croak	Tokay gecko mating call
	Turkey	gobble	Wild Turkey
	Turtle	grunt (mating), hiss	
	Whale	sing	Humpback whale Sperm whale
	Wild boar	growl, grumble	Wild boar
	Wildebeest	low, moo	
	Wolf	howl, growl, bay	Wolf howls
	Zebra	bray, bark, whistle, yip, nicker	

== See also ==
- Animal communication
- Animal epithet
- Animal language
- Bioacoustics
- Cat organ & piganino
- Cross-linguistic onomatopoeias § Animal sounds
- Field recording
- List of animal names
- List of onomatopoeias
- "Old MacDonald Had a Farm"
- "The Fox (What Does the Fox Say?)"
