= Snarl (disambiguation) =

A snarl is a type of facial expression.

Snarl may also refer to:

- Snarl (Transformers), several fictional robot superhero characters from the Transformers robot superhero franchise.
- Snarl (software), a notification system for the Windows operating system
- A technique of metal decoration; see snarling iron
