= Wolf communication =

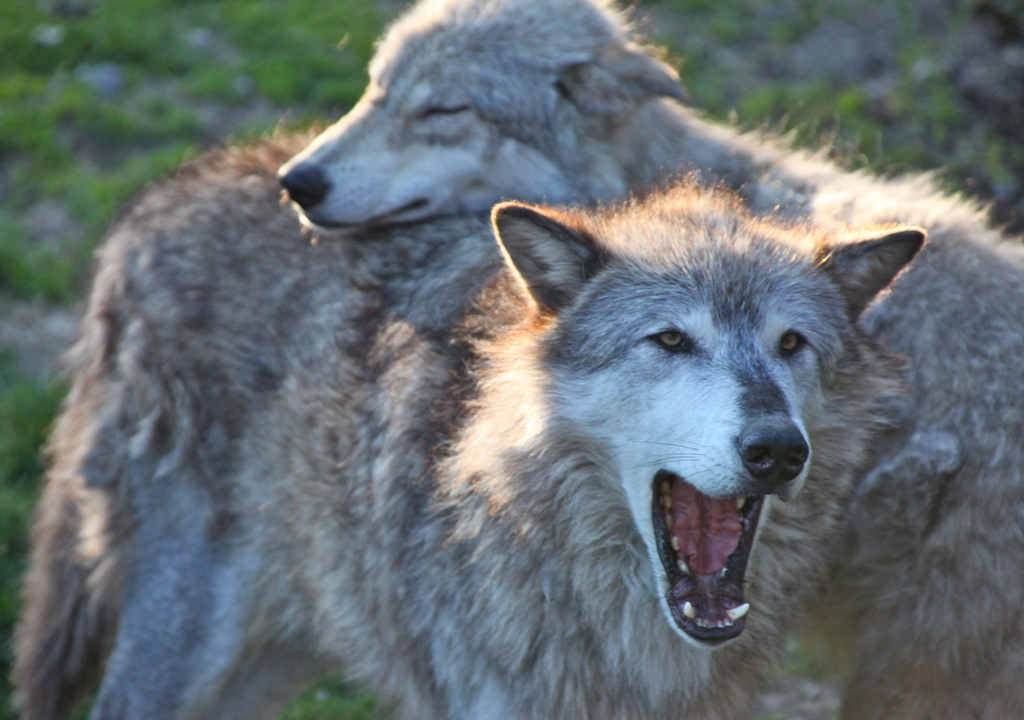
Gray wolf pair touching

Wolves communicate using vocalizations, body postures, scent, touch, and taste. Despite popular belief, wolves do not howl at the Moon; the lunar phases have no effect on wolf vocalisation. Gray wolves howl to assemble the pack, usually before and after hunts, to pass on an alarm particularly at a den site, to locate each other during a storm or while crossing unfamiliar territory, and to communicate across great distances. Other vocalisations include growls, barks and whines. Wolves do not bark as loudly or continuously as dogs do but they bark a few times and then retreat from a perceived danger. Aggressive or self-assertive wolves are characterized by their slow and deliberate movements, high body posture and raised hackles, while submissive ones carry their bodies low, sleeken their fur, and lower their ears and tail. Raised leg urination is considered to be one of the most important forms of scent communication in the wolf, making up 60–80% of all scent marks observed.

== Visual ==
The gray wolf's expressive behavior is more complex than that of the coyote and golden jackal, as necessitated by its group living and hunting habits. While less gregarious canids generally possess simple repertoires of visual signals, wolves have more varied signals that subtly inter grade in intensity. When neutral, the legs are not stiffened, the tail hangs down loosely, the face is smooth, the lips untensed, and the ears point in no particular direction. Postural communication in wolves consists of a variety of facial expressions, tail positions and piloerection. Aggressive, or self-assertive wolves are characterized by their slow and deliberate movements, high body posture and raised hackles, while submissive ones carry their bodies low, sleeken their fur and lower their ears and tail. When a breeding male encounters a subordinate family member, it may stare at it, standing erect and still with the tail horizontal to its spine. Two forms of submissive behavior are recognized: passive and active. Passive submission usually occurs as a reaction to the approach of a dominant animal, and consists of the submissive wolf lying partly on its back and allowing the dominant wolf to sniff its anogenital area. Active submission occurs often as a form of greeting, and involves the submissive wolf approaching another in a low posture, and licking the other wolf's face. When wolves are together, they commonly indulge in behaviors such as nose pushing, jaw wrestling, cheek rubbing and facial licking. The mouthing of each other's muzzles is a friendly gesture, while clamping on the muzzle with bared teeth is a dominance display.

Similar to humans, gray wolves have facial color patterns in which the gaze direction can be easily identified, although this is often not the case in other canid species. In 2014, a study compared the facial color pattern across 25 canid species. The results suggested that the facial color pattern of canid species is related to their gaze communication, and that especially gray wolves use the gaze signal in conspecific communication.

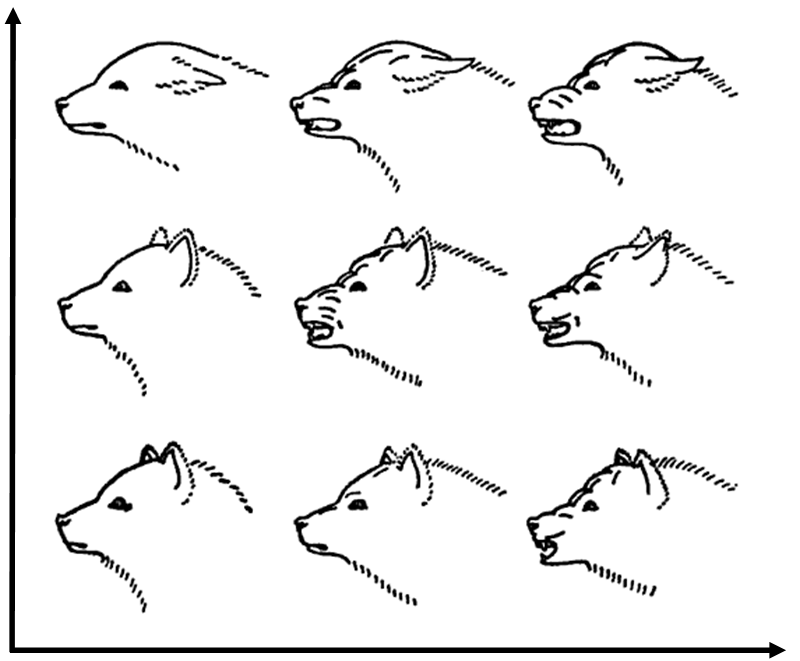
Facial expressions (Konrad Lorenz, 1952). Bottom to top: increasing fear (ears back); left to right: increasing aggression (snarl); top right: maximum of both.

Expressive characteristics of visual features used during social interactions in wolves
Feature	Aggressive	Fearful
Eyes	Direct stare Open wide	Looking away Closed to slits
Ears	Erect and forward	Flattened and turned down to side
Lips	Horizontal contraction ("agonistic pucker")	Horizontal retraction ("submissive grin")
Mouth	Opened	Closed
Teeth	Canines bared	Canines covered
Tongue	Retracted	Extended ("lick intention")
Nose	Shortened (skin folded)	Lengthened (skin smoothed)
Forehead	Contracted (bulging over eyes)	Stretched (smoothed)
Head	Held high	Lowered
Neck	Arched	Extended
Hair	Erect (bristled)	Sleeked
Body	Erect, tall	Crouched, low
Tail	Held high Quivering	Tucked under body Wagging

== Auditory ==
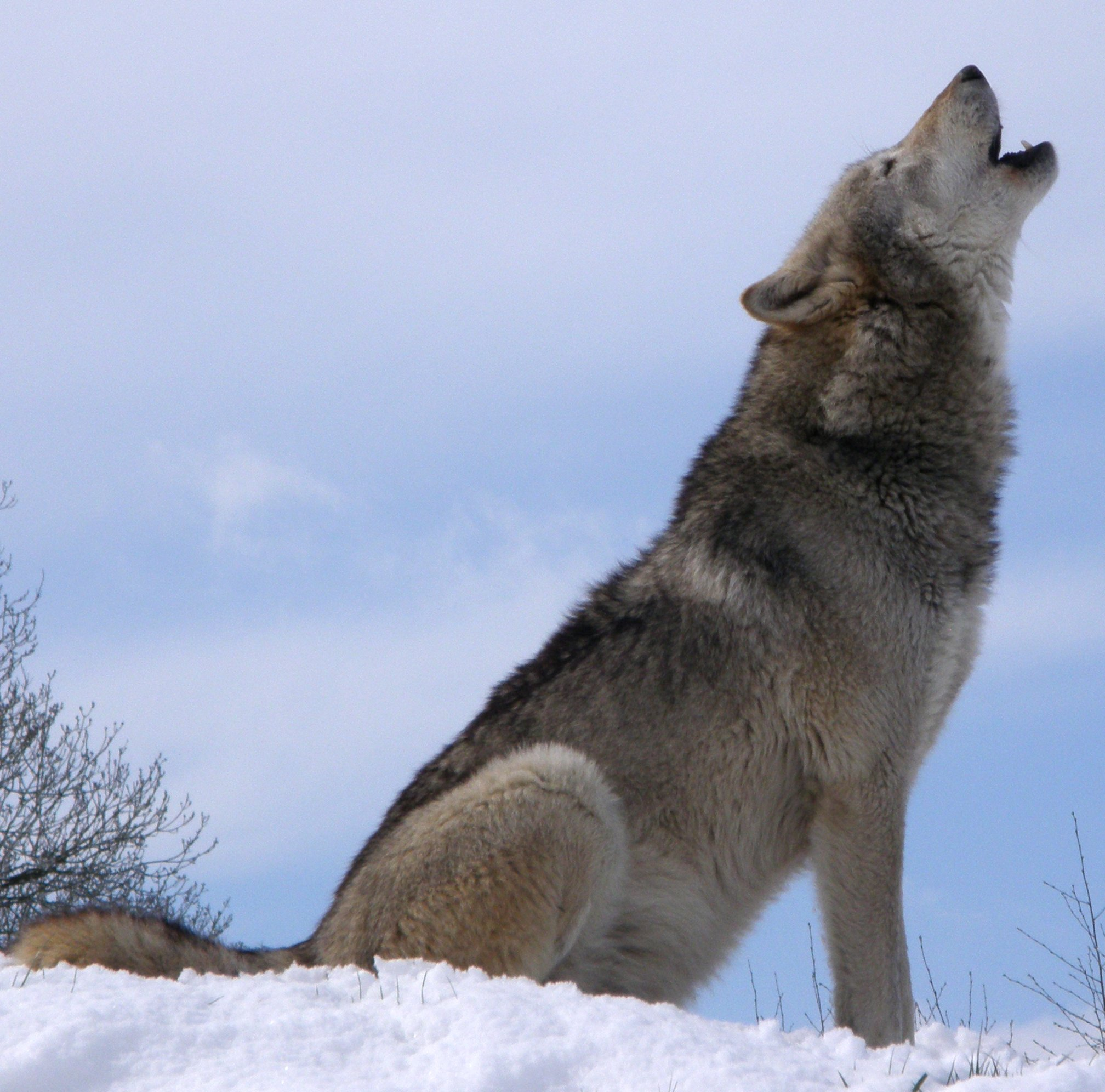
Gray wolf howling

Wolves howling

Rallying cry

Gray wolves howl to assemble the pack (usually before and after hunts), to pass on an alarm (particularly at a den site), to locate each other during a storm or unfamiliar territory and to communicate across great distances. Wolf howls can under certain conditions be heard over areas of up to 130 km^{2} (50 sq mi). Wolf howls are generally indistinguishable from those of large dogs. Male wolves give voice through an octave, passing to a deep bass with a stress on "O", while females produce a modulated nasal baritone with stress on "U". Pups almost never howl, while yearling wolves produce howls ending in a series of dog-like yelps. Howling consists of a fundamental frequency that may lie between 150 and 780 Hz, and consists of up to 12 harmonically related overtones. The pitch usually remains constant or varies smoothly, and may change direction as many as four or five times. Howls used for calling pack mates to a kill are long, smooth sounds similar to the beginning of the cry of a great horned owl. When pursuing prey, they emit a higher pitched howl, vibrating on two notes. When closing in on their prey, they emit a combination of a short bark and a howl. When howling together, wolves harmonize rather than chorus on the same note, thus creating the illusion of there being more wolves than there actually are. Lone wolves typically avoid howling in areas where other packs are present. Wolves from different geographic locations may howl in different fashions: according to Erik Zimen, the howls of European wolves are much more protracted and melodious than those of North American wolves, whose howls are louder and have a stronger emphasis on the first syllable.

Other vocalisations of wolves are usually divided into three categories: growls, barks and whines. Barking has a fundamental frequency between 320–904 Hz, and is usually emitted by startled wolves. Wolves do not bark as loudly or continuously as dogs do, but bark a few times and retreat from perceived danger. Growling has a fundamental frequency of 380–450 Hz, and is usually emitted during food challenges. Pups commonly growl when playing. One variation of the howl is accompanied by a high pitched whine, which precedes a lunging attack. Whining is associated with situations of anxiety, curiosity, inquiry and intimacy such as greeting, feeding pups and playing.

== Olfactory ==
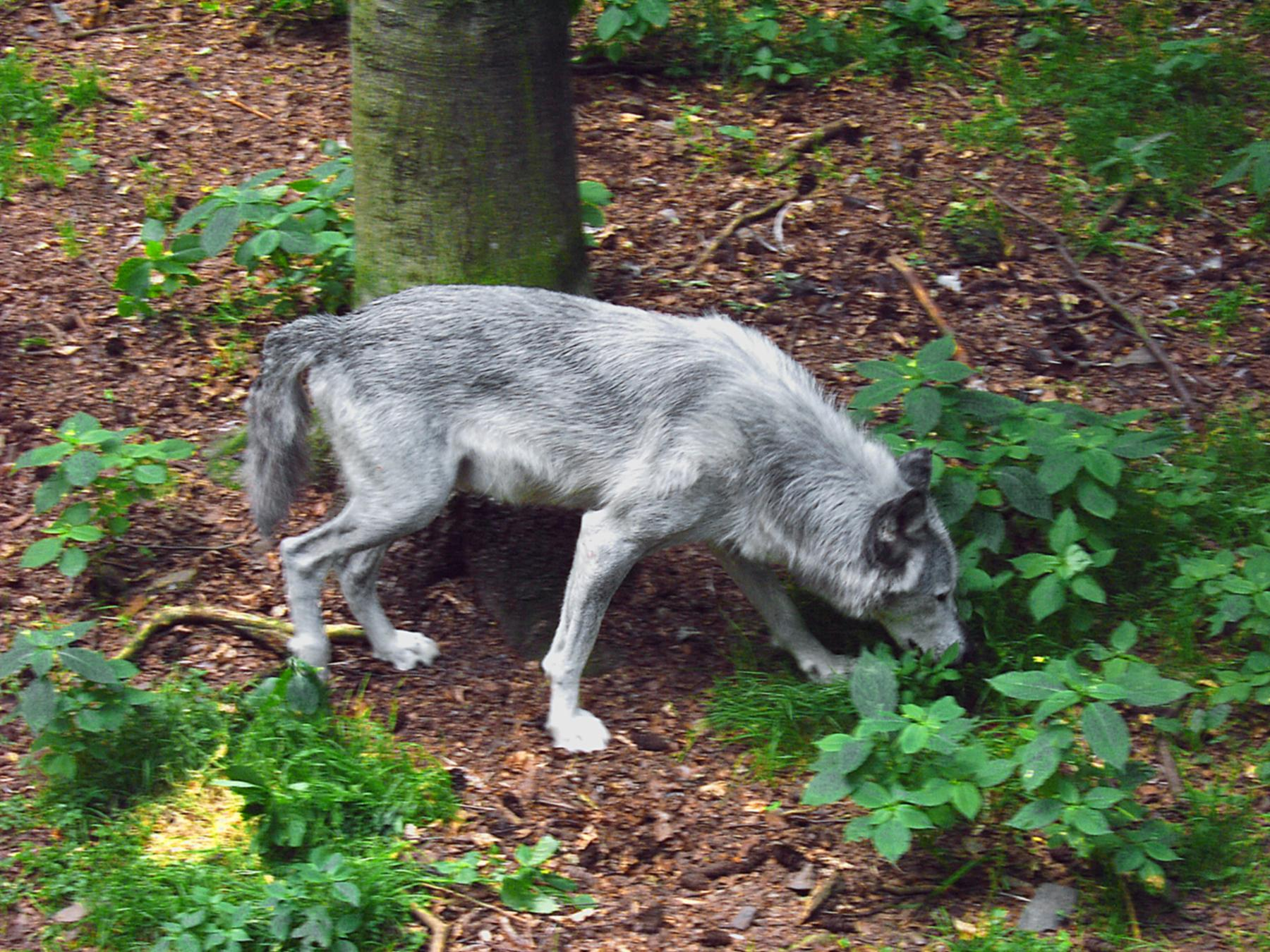
A wolf sniffing the ground

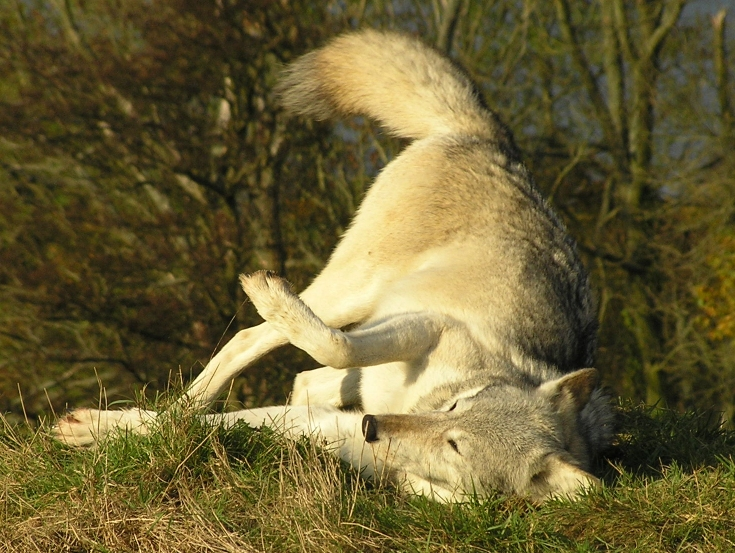
A wolf scent-rolling

Olfaction is probably the wolf's most acute sense, and plays a fundamental role in communication. The wolf has a large number of apocrine sweat glands on the face, lips, back, and between the toes. The odor produced by these glands varies according to the individual wolf's microflora and diet, giving each a distinct "odor fingerprint". A combination of apocrine and eccrine sweat glands on the feet allows the wolf to deposit its scent whilst scratching the ground, which usually occurs after urine marking and defecation during the breeding season. The follicles present on the guard hairs from the wolf's back have clusters of apocrine and sebaceous glands at their bases. As the skin on the back is usually folded, this provides a microclimate for bacterial propagation around the glands. During piloerection, the guard hairs on the back are raised and the skin folds spread, thus releasing scent.

The precaudal scent glands may play a role in expressing aggression, as combative wolves raise the base of their tails whilst drooping the tip, thus positioning the scent glands at the highest point. The wolf possesses a pair of anal sacs beneath the rectum, which contain both apocrine and sebaceous glands. The components of anal sac secretions vary according to season and sex, thus indicating that the secretions provide information related to their sex and reproductive state. The secretions of the preputial glands may advertise hormonal condition or social position, as dominant wolves have been observed to stand over subordinates, apparently presenting the genital area for investigation, which may include genital licking.

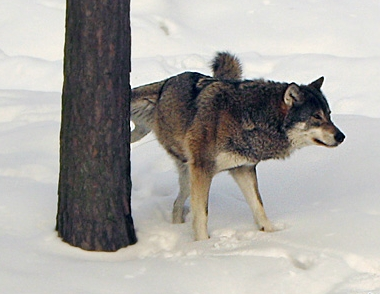
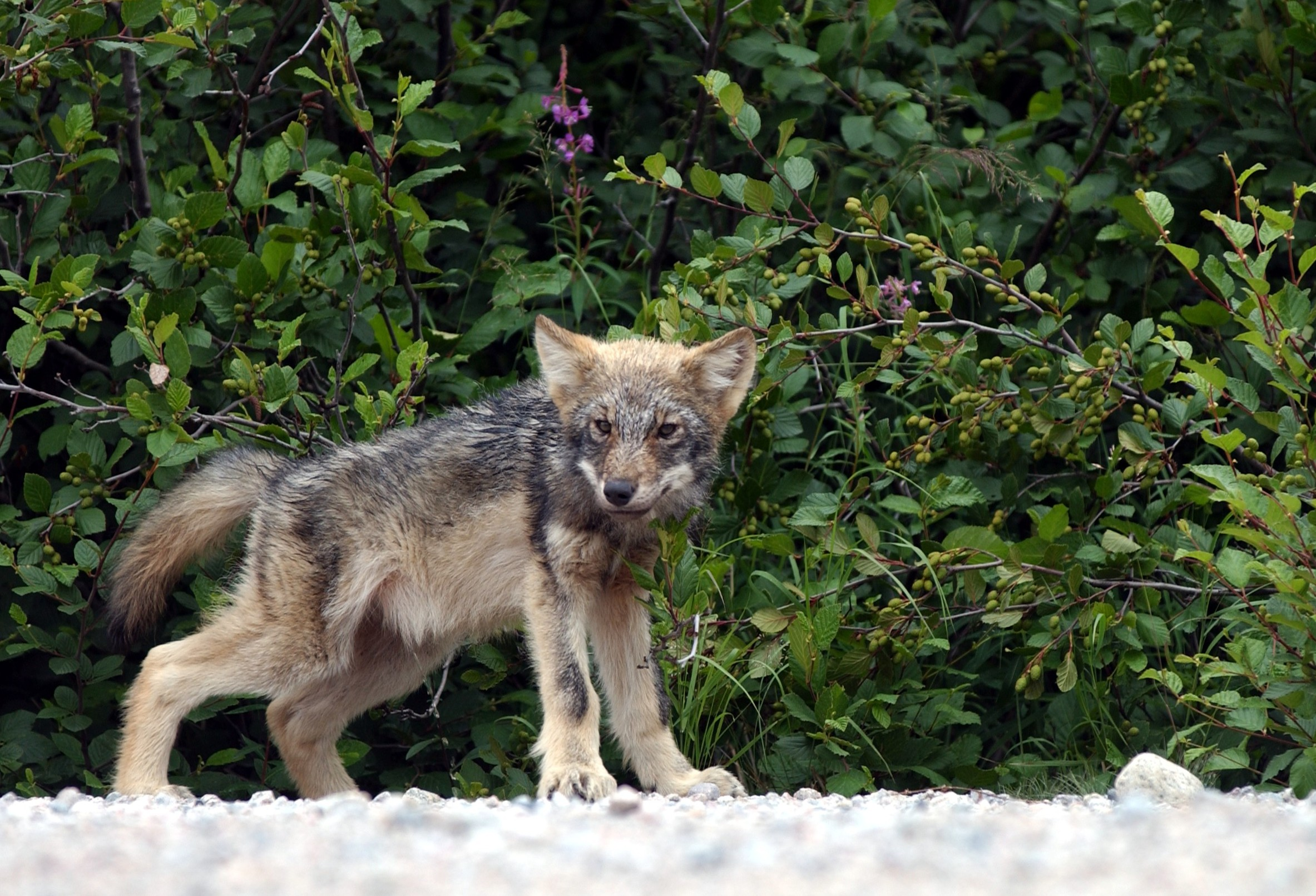
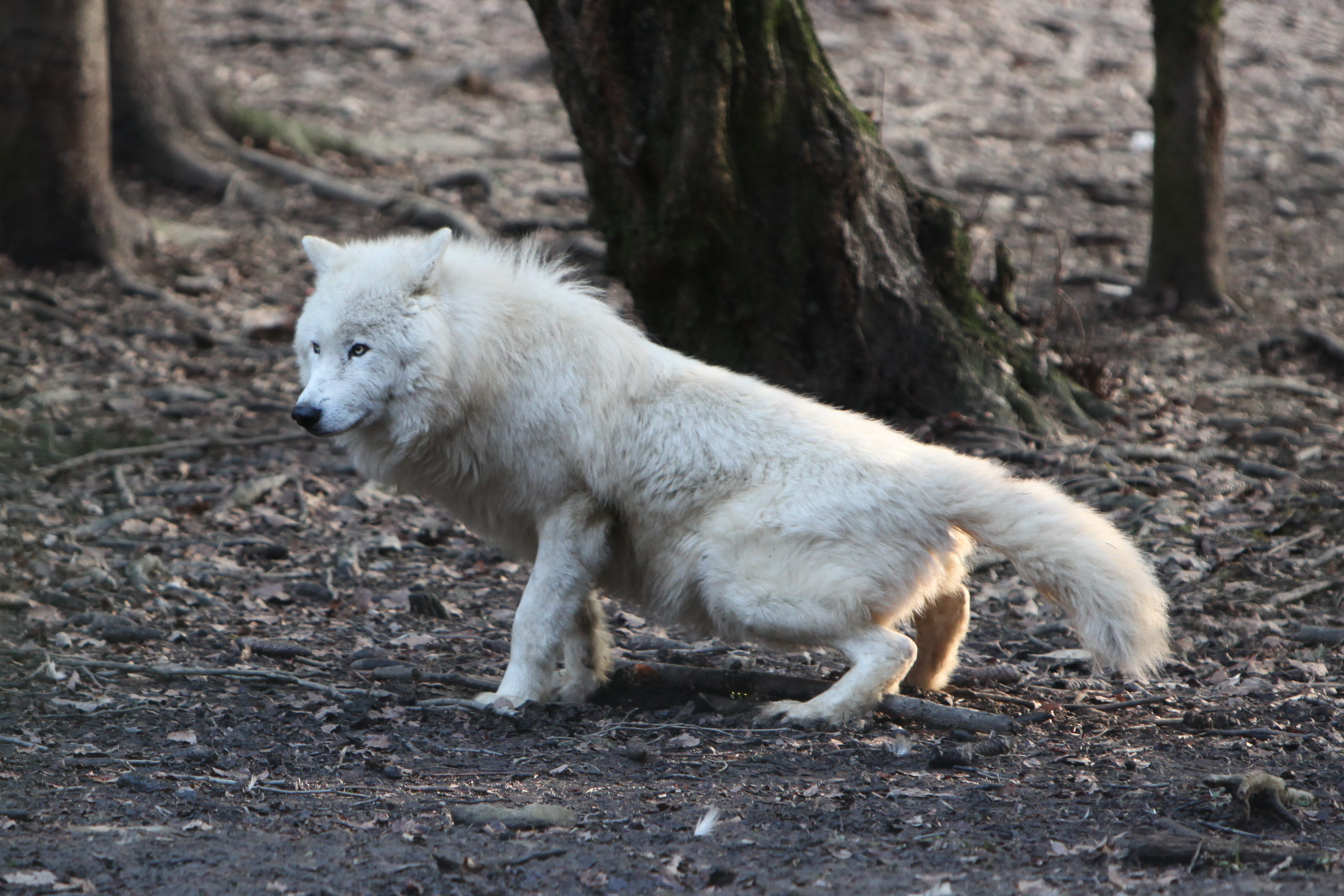
Raised-leg urination, standing urination, and squatting urination postures

During the breeding season, female wolves secrete substances from the vagina, which communicate the females' reproductive state, and can be detected by males from long distances. Urine marking is the best-studied means of olfactory communication in wolves. Its exact function is debated, though most researchers agree that its primary purpose is to establish boundaries. Wolves urine mark more frequently and vigorously in unfamiliar areas, or areas of intrusion, where the scent of other wolves or canids is present. So-called raised leg urination (RLU) is more common in male wolves than in females, and may serve the purpose of maximizing the possibility of detection by conspecifics, as well as reflect the height of the marking wolf. Only dominant wolves typically use RLU, with subordinate males continuing to use the juvenile standing posture throughout adulthood. RLU is considered to be one of the most important forms of scent communication in the wolf, making up 60–80% of all scent marks observed. Like other canids, wolves urinate on their food caches in order to identify them. Their urine contains pyrazine analogs that act as kairomones, repelling their prey.

== See also ==
- Dog communication

== Bibliography ==
- Lopez, Barry H. (1978). Of Wolves and Men. J. M. Dent and Sons Limited. ISBN 978-0-7432-4936-2.
- Mech, L. David; Boitani, Luigi, eds. (2003). Wolves: Behaviour, Ecology and Conservation. University of Chicago Press. ISBN 978-0-226-51696-7.
- Zimen, Erik (1981). The Wolf: His Place in the Natural World. Souvenir Press. ISBN 978-0-285-62411-5.
