= Roar =

Deep resonating sound produced by animals

Captive lion roaring at the Franklin Park Zoo

Captive tiger roaring at Tierpark Hagenbeck

A roar /rɔːr/ is a type of animal vocalization that is loud, deep and resonating. Many mammals have evolved to produce roars and other roar-like vocals for purposes such as long-distance communication and intimidation. These include various species of big cats, bears, pinnipeds, deer, bovids, elephants, and simians.

The anatomical basis for the ability to roar often involves modifications to the larynx and hyoid bone and enlarged internal air spaces for low-frequency vocal resonation. While roaring, animals may stretch out their necks and elevate their heads to increase the space for resonance.

== Definition ==
The definition of "roar" has varied between species. However Weissengruber et al. (2002) has given a more general description of roars as consisting of both a low pitch and low formant. They have used the roars of lions and red deer as quintessential examples of the sound. Other researchers have mentioned similar "roar-like" vocalizations where either the pitch or formant is still higher than in true roars.

== Roaring anatomy ==
Roaring mammals have evolved various means to achieve their vocalizations. A proportionally large larynx contributes to a deeper pitch. The male hammer-headed bat has a larynx that takes up most of his thoracic cavity and is half the size of his backbone. A larger larynx also has enlarged vocal cords which contributes to a deeper pitch and more massive folds leads to slower oscillation. In addition, the big cats (lion, tiger, jaguar and leopard, referred to as the "roaring cats"), have vocal cords that are square-shaped as opposed to the triangle-shaped cords of other felids; this allows them to produce a louder call with less lung pressure. The elasticity of the larynx and the length of the vocal tract affect the formant or resonance of a sound. In big cats and some male deer, specialized musculature and ligaments pull the larynx deeper in the vocal tract when roaring, lowering the vocal tract resonance.

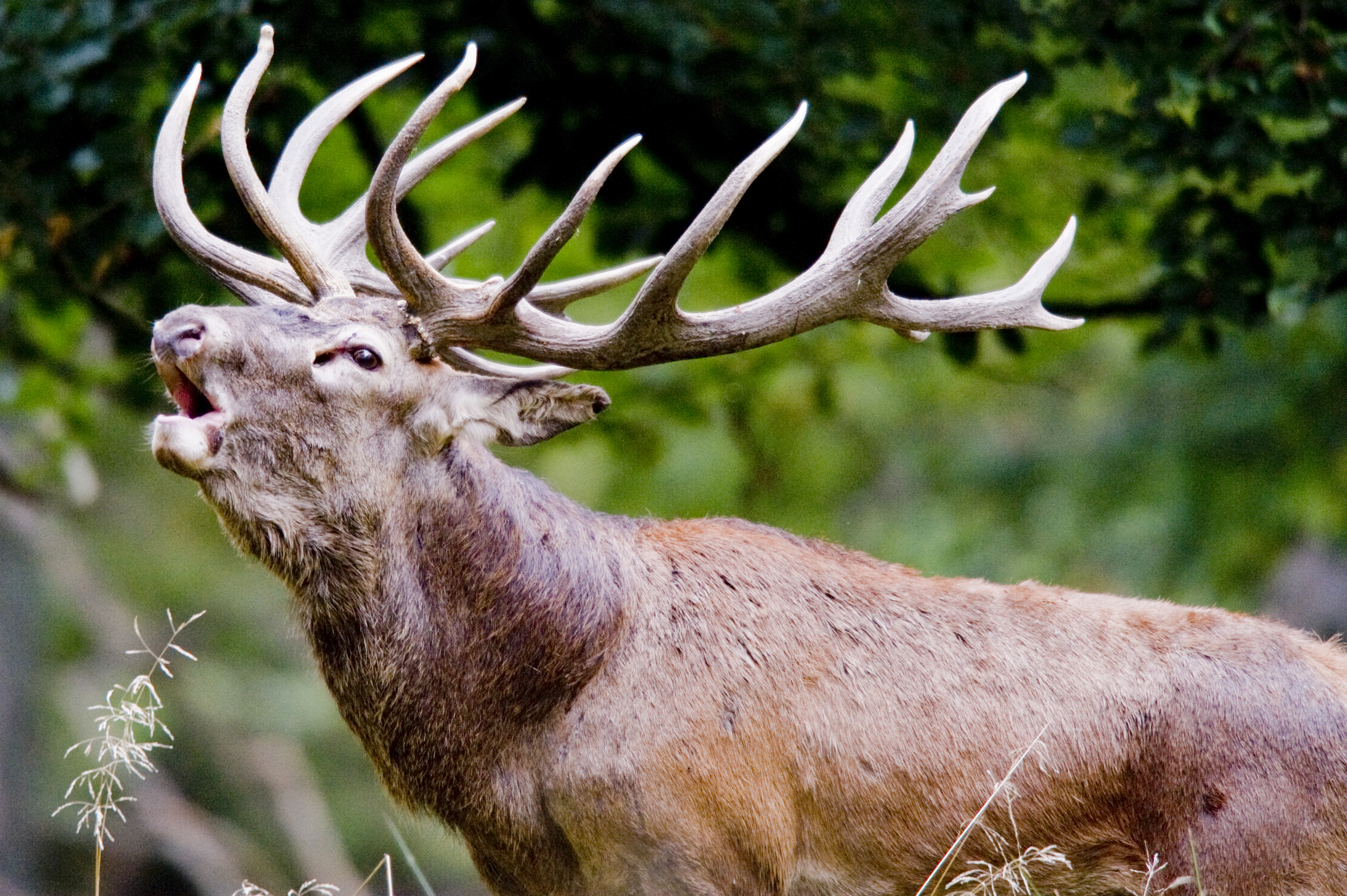
Red deer stag roaring

Red deer roar
Sound of red deer roar

Other species have evolved internal inflatable air spaces connected to the vocal tract, which play a role in vocal resonance. The male Mongolian gazelle and musk ox possess an air space (paired and two-chambered in the former) attached to the larynx, while bears have such spaces connected to the pharynx. Male howler monkeys have an unpaired rostroventral laryngeal air sac within the hyoid bulla (extension of the hyoid bone) and a pair of ventral laryngeal air spaces outside. The hammer-headed bat has a pouch in the palatine that connects to an enlarged nasopharynx region, in addition to paired cheek pouches which extend to the rostrum. Elephants possess a pharyngeal pouch associated with their larynx and hyoid apparatus, and their roars can also be modified by the nostrils in their trunks. Male elephant seals and saiga antelopes have an enlarged and inflated proboscis, which also affects resonance. Saiga nevertheless roar with their mouths closed and produce a "nasal roar".

The structure of the hyoid bone can play a role in an animal's ability to roar. The hyoid of the big cats is less ossified and more flexible than in other cats. The snow leopard also has this property, but cannot roar, as its shorter vocal folds provide little resistance to airflow. In howler monkeys, the hyoid bone is relatively large and cup-shaped, contributing to the depth and resonance of the call. Though usually airborne, some roars are emitted underwater, as in the case of the male harbor seal.

== Biological function ==
In some species, roars evolved due to sexual selection, and only one sex roars. For example, in gorillas only the adult male (silverback) has a larynx large enough and vocal cords lengthened enough to produce a full roar. Nonetheless, in other species both sexes can produce these vocalizations. In lions, where both sexes roar, the vocalization plays a role in social spacing and territorial defense. The roars ward off other lions from mistakenly entering another lion's territory. The roar of a lion is audible for up to five miles (8.0 kilometers) in human hearing, and probably further for lions.

== In popular culture ==
Metro-Goldwyn-Mayer intro from 1928 to 1956

The lion's roar is familiar to many through Leo the Lion, the iconic logo seen during the opening sequence of films published by Metro-Goldwyn-Mayer. Leo's current roar, recreated by Mark Mangini in 1982 and redone in 1994 and 1995, consists of tiger growls instead of actual lion roars. As Mangini later stated, "lions don't make that kind of ferocious noises [sic], and the logo needed to be ferocious and majestic".

== See also ==
- Animal language
- Bellow (sound)
- Growling
- Howling
- Rumble (noise)
- Snarl
