= Howling =

Animal sound

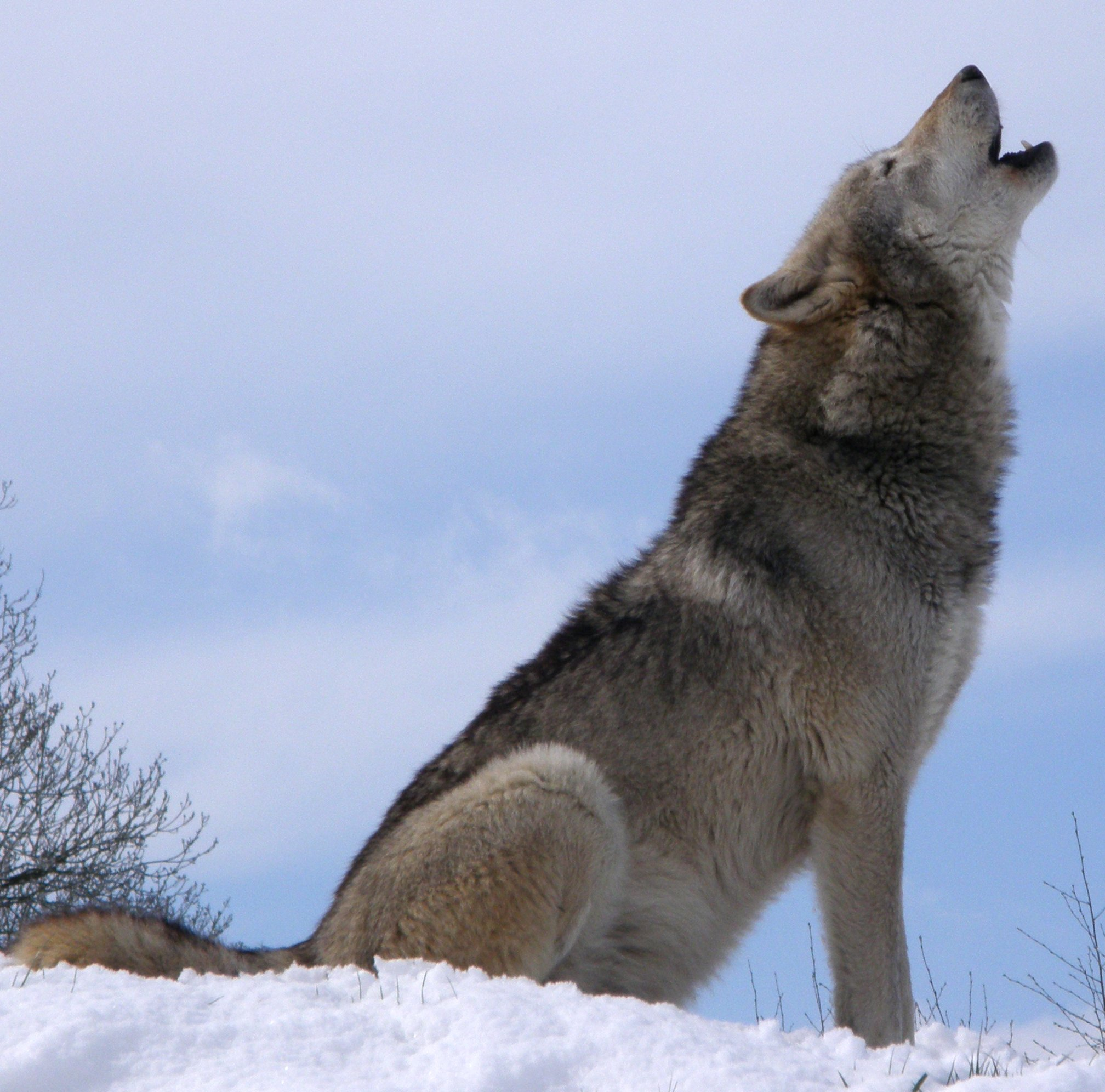
Gray wolves communicate by howling.

Howling is a vocal form of animal communication seen in most canines, particularly wolves, coyotes, foxes, and dogs, as well as cats and some species of monkeys. Howls are lengthy sustained sounds, loud and audible over long distances, often with some variation in pitch over the length of the sound. Howling animals engage in this behavior to signal their positions to one another, to call the pack to assemble, or to note their territory. The behavior is occasionally copied by humans, and has been noted to have varying degrees of significance in human culture.

== In canines ==
Wolves howling

Wolves rallying cry

Pack of coyotes howling at night

The long-distance howling of wolves and coyotes is one way in which canines communicate. Long-distance contact calls are common in Canidae, typically in the form of either barks (termed "pulse trains") or howls (termed "long acoustic streams").

Wolves howl to assemble the pack usually before and after hunts, to pass on an alarm particularly at a den site, to locate each other during a storm, while crossing unfamiliar territory, and to communicate across great distances. Under certain conditions, wolf howls can be heard over areas of up to 130 km^{2} (50 sq mi). The phases of the moon have no effect on wolf vocalization, and despite popular belief, wolves do not howl at the moon.

Wolf howls are generally indistinguishable from those of large dogs. Male wolves give voice through an octave, passing to a deep bass with a stress on "O", while females produce a modulated nasal baritone with stress on "U". Pups almost never howl, while yearling wolves produce howls ending in a series of dog-like yelps.

Howling consists of a fundamental frequency that may lie between 150 and 780 Hz, and consists of up to 12 harmonically related overtones. The pitch usually remains constant or varies smoothly and may change direction as many as four or five times. Howls used for calling pack mates to a kill are long, smooth sounds similar to the beginning of the cry of a great horned owl. When pursuing prey, they emit a higher pitched howl, vibrating on two notes. When closing in on their prey, they emit a combination of a short bark and a howl. When howling together, wolves harmonize rather than chorus on the same note, thus creating the illusion of there being more wolves than there actually are. Lone wolves typically avoid howling in areas where other packs are present. Wolves from different geographic locations may howl in different fashions: the howls of European wolves are much more protracted and melodious than those of North American wolves, whose howls are louder and have a stronger emphasis on the first syllable.

One variation of the howl is accompanied by a high pitched whine, which precedes a lunging attack. Scent marking is more effective at advertising territory than howling and is often used in combination with scratch marks.

The howling of wolves and coyotes is similar, prompting early European explorers of the Americas to confuse the animals. One record from 1750 in Kaskaskia, Illinois, written by a local priest, noted that the "wolves" encountered there were smaller and less daring than European wolves. Another account from the early 1800s in Edwards County mentioned wolves howling at night, though these were likely coyotes.

In coyotes, "bark howls" may serve as both long-distance threat vocalizations and alarm calls. The sound known as 'wow-oo-wow' has been described as a "greeting song". The group yip howl is emitted when two or more pack members reunite and may be the final act of a complex greeting ceremony. Contact calls include lone howls and group howls, as well as the previously mentioned group yip howls. The lone howl is the most iconic sound of the coyote and may serve the purpose of announcing the presence of a lone individual separated from its pack. Group howls are used as both substitute group yip howls and as responses to either lone howls, group howls, or group yip howls.

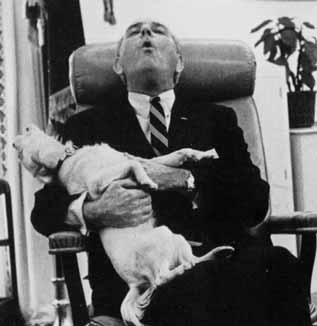
U.S. President Lyndon B. Johnson playfully howling with his dog, Yuki

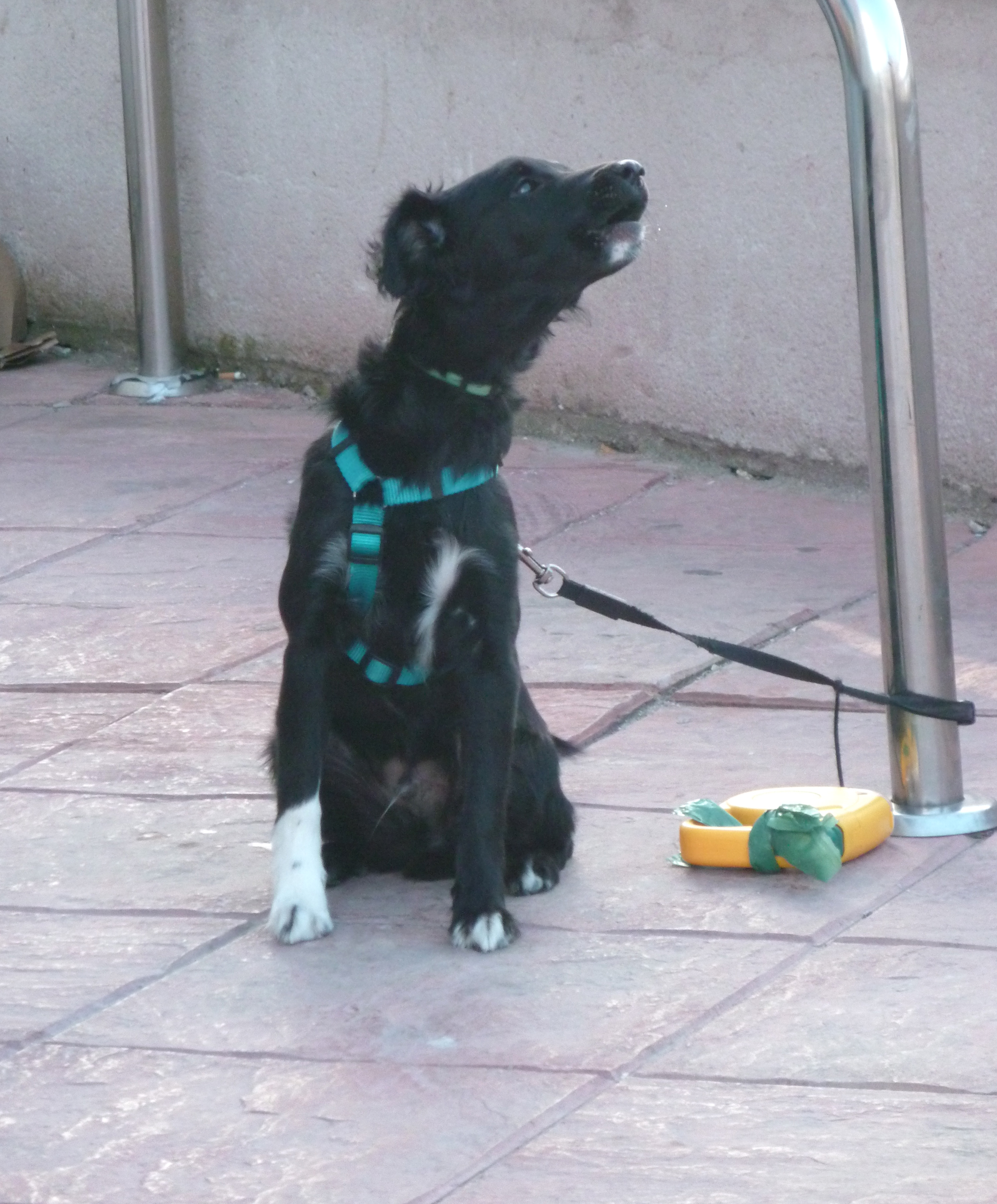
Dog howling to indicate that it is present or in its territory

Dog communication includes specific types of howls that have been identified in dogs, including:

- Yip-howl – lonely, in need of companionship.
- Howling – indicates the dog is present, or indicating that this is its territory.
- Bark-howl, 2–3 barks followed by a mournful howl – dog is relatively isolated, locked away with no companionship, calling for company or a response from another dog.
- Baying – can be heard during tracking to call pack-mates to the quarry.

The vocal repertoire of the fox, though substantial, includes fewer howling behaviors. At the age of about one month, fox kits can emit a high-pitched howl as an explosive call intended to be threatening to intruders or other cubs.

== In howler monkeys ==
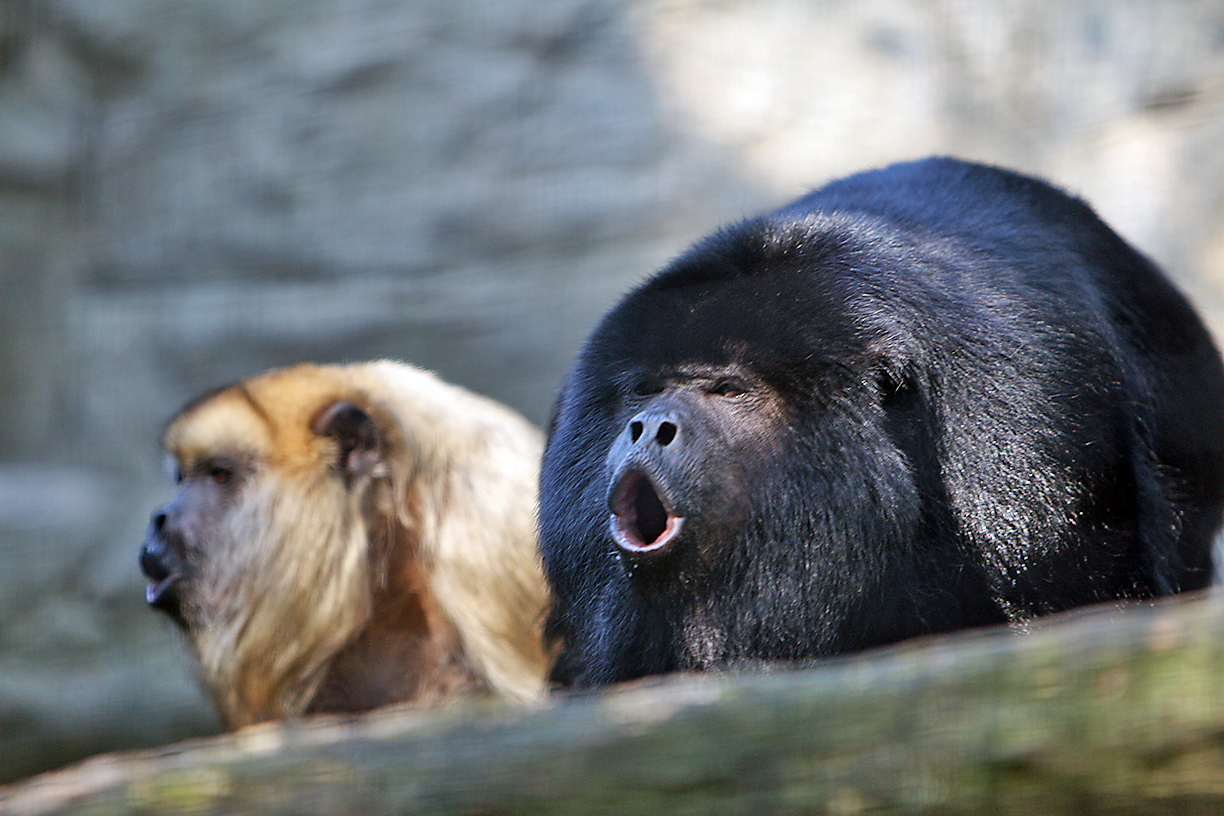
A pair of black howler monkeys (Alouatta caraya) vocalising

Howler monkey growls

Outside of canines, the howler monkey is also noted for behavior characterized as howling. As their name suggests, vocal communication forms an important part of their social behavior. They each have an enlarged basihyal or hyoid bone, which helps them make their loud vocalizations. Group males generally call at dawn and dusk, as well as interspersed times throughout the day. Their main vocals consist of loud, deep, guttural growls or "howls". Howler monkeys are widely considered to be the loudest land animals. According to Guinness Book of World Records, their vocalizations can be heard clearly for 3 mi (4.8 km). The function of howling is thought to relate to intergroup spacing and territory protection, as well as possibly to mate-guarding.

== In human culture ==
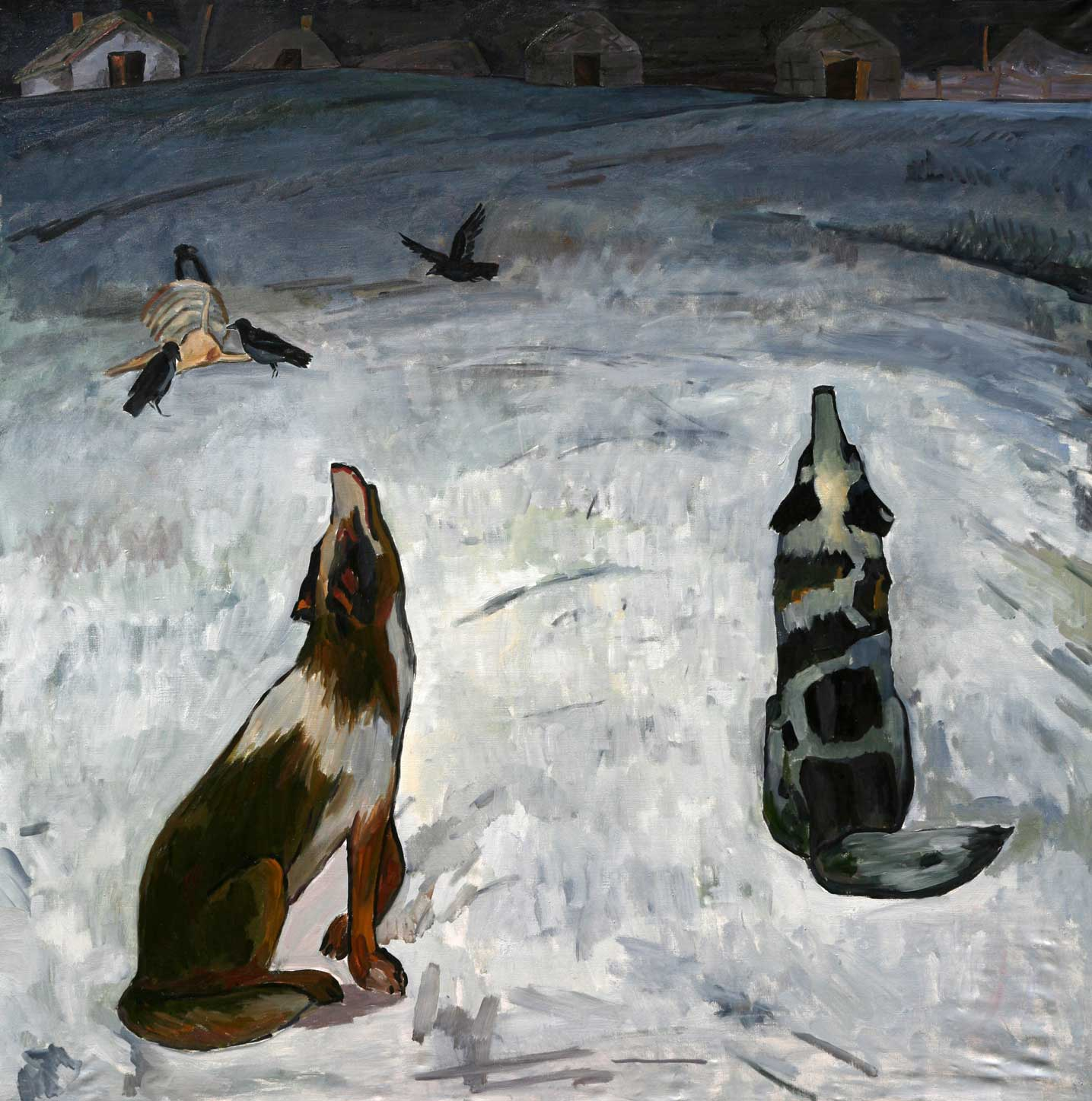
Painting of howling wolves by Ochir Kikeev (1988)

Human accounts of wolf behavior are typified by depictions of howling, and this has been incorporated into fictional and mythical representations, such as the werewolf. Virgil, in his poetic work Eclogues, wrote about a man called Moeris, who used herbs and poisons picked in his native Pontus to turn himself into a wolf. An examination of Virgil's work notes that "[t]he howling of wolves is portentous; it is cited among the baleful omens at the assassination of Julius Caesar and the advent of renewed civil strife". In prose, the Satyricon, written circa AD 60 by Gaius Petronius Arbiter, one of the characters, Niceros, tells a story at a banquet about a friend who turned into a wolf (chs. 61–62). He describes the incident as follows, "When I look for my buddy I see he'd stripped and piled his clothes by the roadside... He pees in a circle round his clothes and then, just like that, turns into a wolf!... after he turned into a wolf he started howling and then ran off into the woods." Such depictions have become a staple of modern depictions of werewolves and other monstrous dogs, leading to their central position in media such as The Howling media franchise, the 2012 Korean film, Howling, and the 2015 British film, Howl. Howling by humans has historically been associated with wildness and madness.

The howling of wolves has been described as "perhaps the most evocative sound of any wild creature", alternately beautiful and dismal, and consequently recordings of howling have sometimes been incorporated into music. Although wolves howling at the Moon is a myth, it is also one that has made its way into human imagery of wolves, as with the Three Wolf Moon t-shirt meme.

== See also ==
- Animal language
- Bark (sound)
- Growling
- Roar
- Snarl

== Bibliography ==
- Busch, R. H. (2007). Wolf Almanac, New and Revised: A Celebration Of Wolves And Their World (3rd ed.). Rowman & Littlefield. ISBN 978-1-59921-069-8.
- Coren, Stanley (2012). How To Speak Dog. New York: Simon and Schuster. ISBN 9781471109416.
- Lopez, Barry H. (1978). Of Wolves and Men. J. M. Dent and Sons Limited. ISBN 978-0-7432-4936-2.
- Mech, L. David; Boitani, Luigi, eds. (2003). Wolves: Behaviour, Ecology and Conservation. University of Chicago Press. ISBN 978-0-226-51696-7.
- Zimen, Erik (1981). The Wolf: His Place in the Natural World. Souvenir Press. pp. 217–218. ISBN 978-0-285-62411-5.
