= Erik Zimen =

Swedish behavioral scientist (1941–2003)

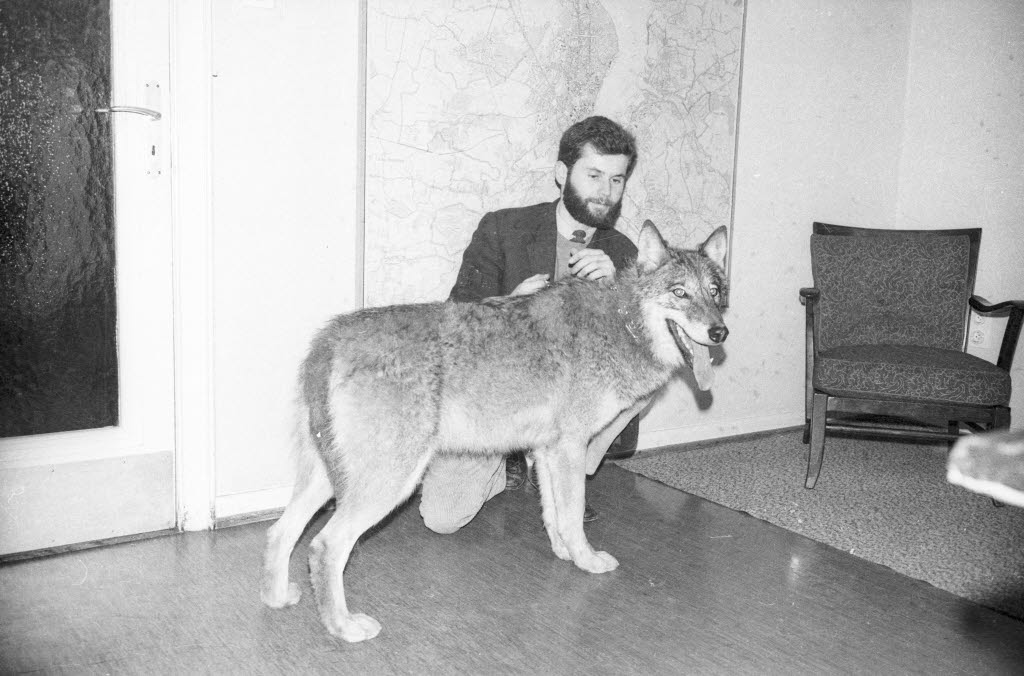
Erik Zimen with a wolf (1968)

Erik Zimen (1941–2003) was a Swedish behavioral scientist. He specialized in the behavior of wolves and dogs, carrying out his research in Bavarian forests and the Parco Nazionale d'Abruzzo, Lazio e Molise, Italy. He is best known for his book The Wolf.

Zimen's research included a study of poodle-wolf mixes, called "puwos."
