= Gecker =

Baby primates sound

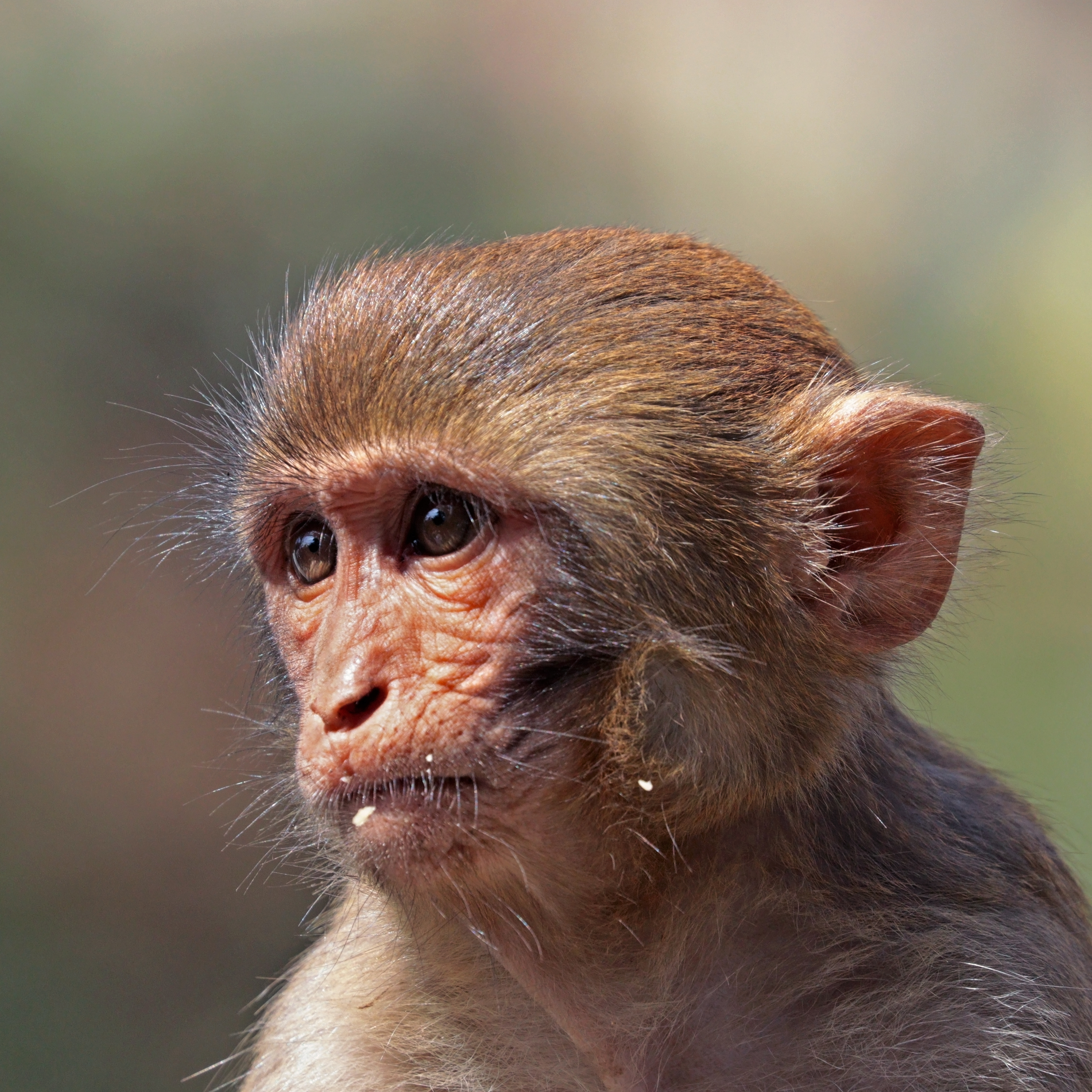
Baby Rhesus macaque in Kathmandu, Nepal

A gecker is a vocalization most often associated with infant primates. It is defined as a loud and distinct vocalization, which consists of a broken staccato noise. In 1965, Irven DeVore of the Center for Advanced Study in the Behavioral Sciences described geckering as a "single sharp yak sound", which may be repeated. It has also been characterized as "cackling." It is common in to all types of macaques, geckering is also associated with fearful jackals and mongooses. Patas monkeys have also been observed to gecker. In macaques, bickering is associated with spastic jerking of the body. Geckers are also commonly displayed in combination with grimaces.

== Prevalence ==
In macaque monkeys, geckers are the most prevalent during their first year of life. They account for approximately 40% of vocalizations that occur during the first year of the monkey's life. While they decrease in prevalence after that first year, they still remain prominent during the animal's second year, accounting for approximately 12% of the vocalizations made. It is not commonly associated with adult macaques.

== Causes ==
It has been suggested that geckers can be produced without any apparent cause. Newman has stated in his research that they "may largely be a reflection of the immature state of the central nervous systems underlying vocal expression." However, this is not the commonly held belief. Many researchers believe that the gecker is, in fact, a distress cry used by infants in response to being ignored or separated from their mothers. This behaviour is also exemplified in response to sibling births.

The finding that the rate of geckering is associated with sibling birth is associated with time spent on the mother's nipple the month prior to and after the birth of the sibling. Those infants who experienced the greatest reduction in time spent on the nipple had the highest rating of geckering after sibling birth. In addition, the time spent away from the mother was related to the level of tension that animal experienced, which increased their overall rate of geckering.

However, a 1974 study questioned this conclusion; it found that geckering seemed to be a spontaneous occurrence among infant macaques in many different situations and that older infants, which made geckers far less frequently, exhibited different behaviours in situations where they were plainly fearful. A four-year study of geckering reported in 2004 found that the vocalizations most often occurred either for no obvious reason when the infant was with its mother (31.1%) or as the mother was physically moving away from the infant (13.5%). In 49% of cases, the mother paid attention to or renewed contact with the geckering infant, which led the studiers to suggest that the purpose of geckering was to call for maternal attention.

Gecker vocalizations may also be used as a submissive display when they are paired with a grimace, as shown in patas monkeys. This combination of the gecker/grimace display is demonstrated when a lower ranking individual is in the presence of a more dominant one, such as an observer or higher-ranking monkey. A study by Jacobus and Loy showed differences in the response of receiving and giving these displays based on a dominance hierarchy. They found that monkeys who were higher in the hierarchy and deemed more dominant received the most gecker/grimace display. However, they themselves did not produce many. The opposite result was found for monkeys lower in the hierarchy. They produced this display often, but hardly received it at all, if ever. These findings suggest that the display is used to show the animal's submission under the more dominant individual and to please them.

== Sex differences ==
Studies have demonstrated that sex differences are apparent in various aspects of geckering, such as the rate and duration of geckering, responses from mothers, as well as the contexts in which they are displayed. Females have a larger range of call types that are longer in duration and displayed at a higher rate, which requires more effort on the part of the females. Male geckers, on the other hand, are much shorter and less noisy. They also start producing their geckers at a younger age than females. Due to this reason, mothers are more likely to respond positively to males as opposed to females since they typically begin responding to the males earlier than they would for a female.

In addition to responding more positively to males, mothers also tend to respond more often to the vocalizations made by males. A paper by Patel and Owren in 2007 demonstrated this large sex difference. According to their study, 47.2% of the geckers produced by males were met with an immediate response from their mothers compared to only 17.4% if the vocalization came from a female. This leads to increased vulnerability for females in comparison to their male siblings since mothers appear to favour males.

Finally, the context in which gecker vocalizations were produced differed according to sex. Males are more likely to gecker in affiliation contexts (15.4%) in which they engage in prosocial behaviour with their mothers, or in aggressive contexts (27.7%) where they are engaged in aggressive behaviour. Females are more likely to gecker in contexts in which they are following their moving mother (47.6%). This shows that males tend to gecker more frequently in contexts in which they are interacting with some other individual, while females are more likely to use geckering as a response in contexts where they are left behind.

== Examples ==
- Rhesus monkeys
- Pygmy marmosets
- Patas monkeys
- Jackals
- Mongooses
