= Snarling iron =

Metalworking tool

A snarling iron is a metal worker's tool used to drive the walls of metal vessels. "A snarler... is a worker in teapots, and may... be compared with the leaf bumper who bumps up the leaves commonly seen in metalwork". Examples have come to light in different historical contexts, as in Chanhudaro, Indus Valley Civilization.

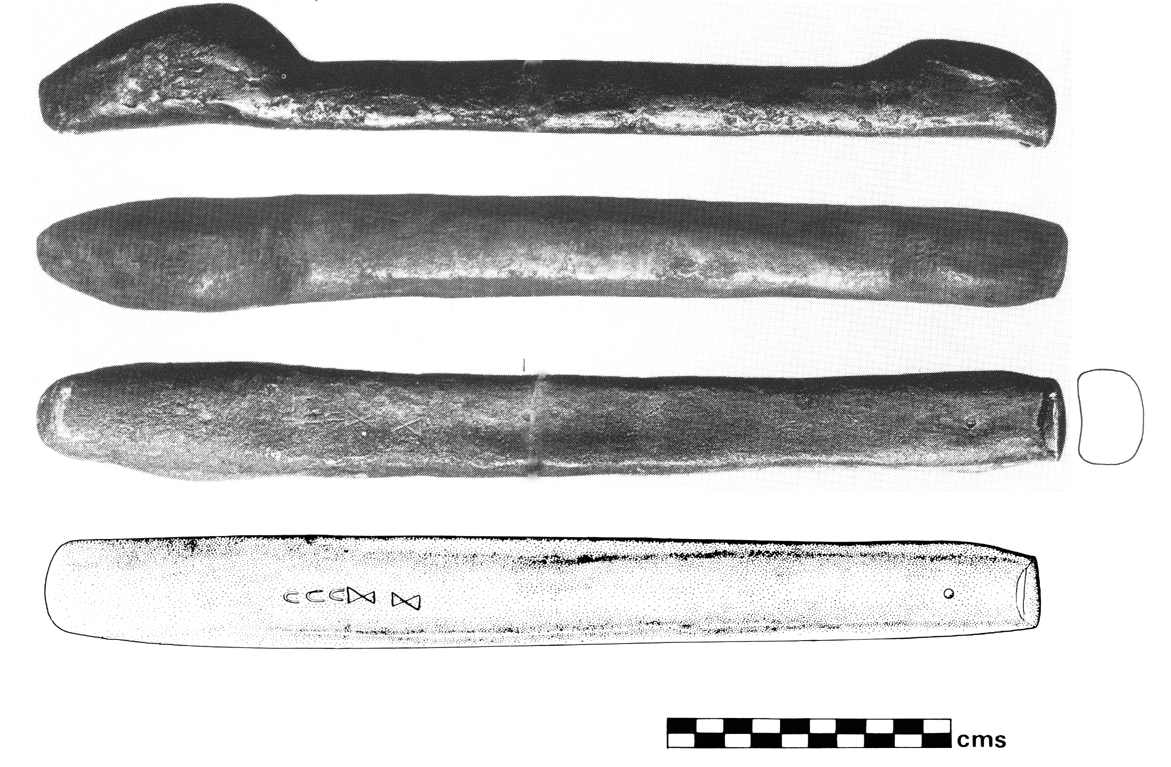
Snarling iron excavated from Chanhudaro, Purana Qila Fort, Delhi
