= Bellow (sound) =

Animal vocalization

bellowing is a type of animal vocalization

A bellow (/ˈbel.oʊ/ is a type of animal vocalization common amongst bulls and other large animals such as alligator, koala, moose, red deer, cattle, bison and rhinoceros. The bull snake bellows and hisses as a defensive sound. It bellows at first in a short period high amplitude, followed by a longer period of low amplitude before it maintains a constant sound.

== In cows ==
Another sound a cow makes is mooing, which they use to show anger, find other herds, and locate mates. Bulls bellow to show contentment.

Bugles are a form of vocalization in cattle. It is high frequency while bellows are of low frequency. The frequency of bellows and bugles depends on factors such as gender, species of cattle, and environment, with many patterns in sound production.
