= Growling =

Low, guttural vocalization

Dog growl
A growl from a dog

Growling is a low, guttural vocalization produced by animals as an aggressive warning but can also be found in other contexts such as playful behaviors or mating. Different animals will use growling in specific contexts as a form of communication. In humans, low or dull rumbling noises may also be emitted when they are discontent with something or they are angry, although this human sound is often termed "groaning" & "grunting".

Animals that growl include felines, bears, canines and crocodilians. The animals most commonly known for growling are canines, bears, and felines.

Grrr /ˈɡɹ̩ːː/ is an onomatopoeic word which imitates the growling sound of animals, often used with other related meanings. It is one of the rare pronounceable words of the English language that consists solely of consonants. Its most simple use is by children imitating animals. An example would be: "Mom!, Dad!, Look at me! I'm a polar bear! Grrr!" This word is also widely used in various titles to express growling when written.

== Growling anatomy ==
The growl is emitted from the larynx, also known as the voice box, which is located at the top of the throat. It is made up of both cartilage and soft tissue, with an opening in the center to allow the passage of air. Similar to how humans learn to speak, animals learn to growl through the vibration of their vocal cords that occurs when air enters the larynx and passes over them. Animals such as dogs tend to have a lower frequency when growling in proportion to the length of their neck, a longer neck will cause a lower frequency.

Growling usually first appears in dogs when puppies are about 24 days of age during play fights, emitting a pitch of up to 450 Hz with great variation in consistency. By 9 weeks old, puppies produce a growl of around 300 Hz, with no variation in consistency. This is the final development of the dogs' growl, which will remain consistent through its life, although may vary in pitch between individuals. In other animals, growling can occur for various reasons, the most common of which are fear, aggression, territoriality and even, in the case of alligators, mating.

== Growling in canines ==
Dogs are one of the most common animals known to growl. Dogs growl as a form of communication, most often when they are displaying signs of aggression. Dogs can also growl when they are playing with other canines/humans, growling over their possessions, when they are in pain, or during territorial displays. Human interpretation of dogs and other canines growling is often context-dependent. If the growl is isolated as an audio clip, generally humans are unable to determine if the growl is playful, angry, or otherwise. When the growl is elicited directly from the dog, humans are often able to use other physical cues, as well as the length and volume/tone of the growl, to interpret its meaning. Humans who are more frequently in the presence of canines are more accurately able to interpret the meaning of growls.

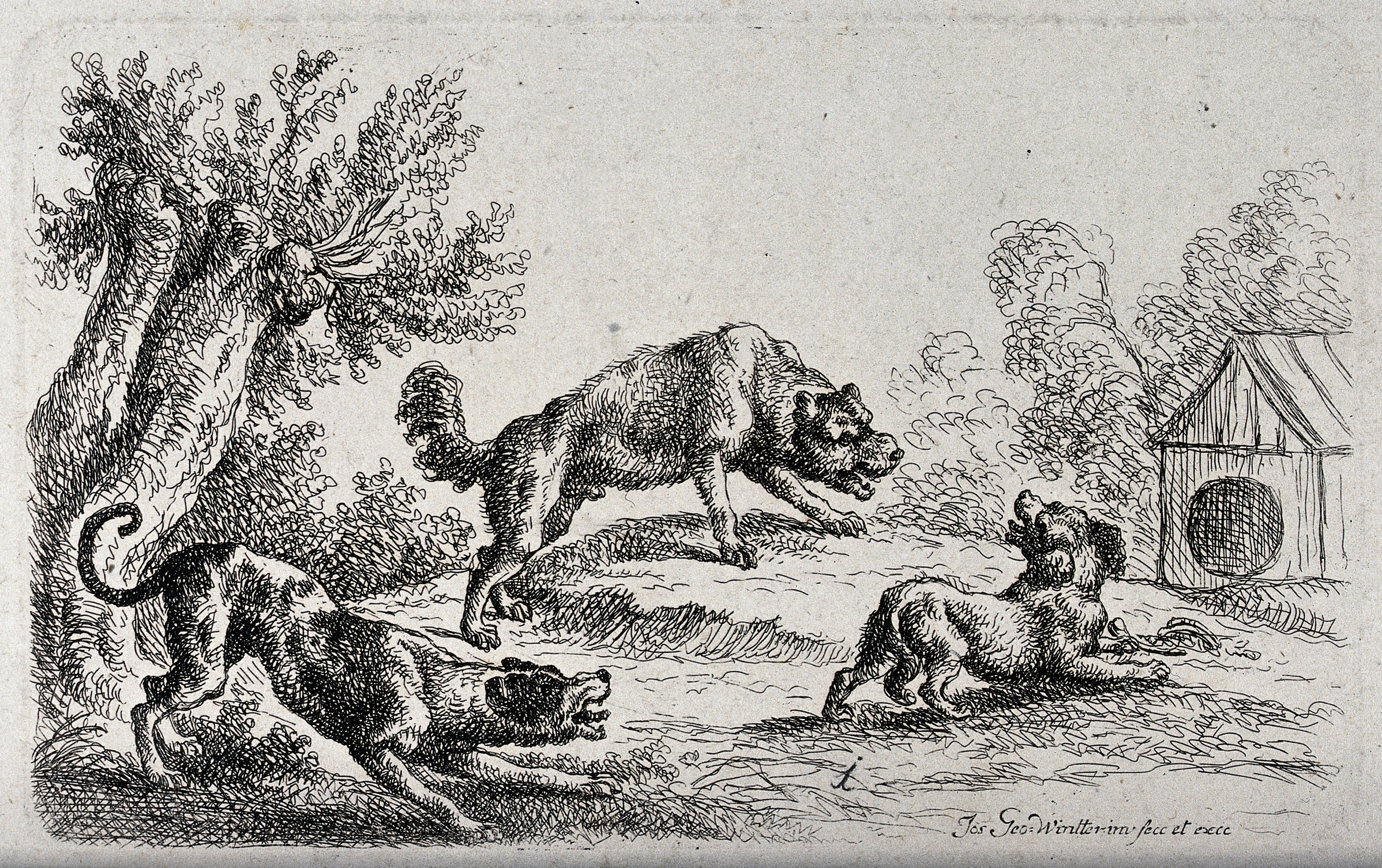
Two large dogs barking and growling at a smaller dog

Since dogs are able to distinguish between the different types of growling such as those that display food possession versus growls that are used during play, their behavior changes in response to another dog's growl. During playful interactions, dogs produce a growl which allows them to project their body size to be bigger than it actually is in order to help stimulate their playful behavior and the one they are playing with. This is in contrast to when they produce a growl that accurately projects their body size when guarding food, which is necessary because it will be more dangerous if their opponent thinks they are bigger, as this may result in more injury.

Growling in dogs is generally seen as unfavorable; there are various methods to deal with this behaviour including therapy, training and temperament testing. The therapy approach to fear-based or aggressive growling in dogs seems to work the best, having a strong emphasis on owner-dog communication and understanding, as well as a strong reward system. Food-related aggression in dogs also elicits a growling response, and often occurs in many shelter dogs. This behaviour can have an adverse effect on their adoption rates, even though there is a high probability the food-related aggression will stop in the adopted home. Proper understanding of dog growling behaviours increases the likelihood of adoption in dogs with growling problems that are housed in shelters. Weight in household dogs is something that fluctuates between owners and has effects on their aggressive behavior with, overweight dogs were more likely to be growling when around strangers or other dogs when compared to non-overweight dogs. Overweight dogs would also be more protective over their own food and more willing to steal food then non-overweight dogs, by using aggressive growling.

== Function of aggressive growling ==
Angry tiger
Tiger in a cage, growling and snarling

Food protection in canines tends to elicit a longer growl than average, and can be directed at humans, other canines, or other animals. Some fish, such as gurnards elicit a growling noise when attempting to grab prey fish, and have been shown to have a higher success rate at obtaining prey than non-growling fish. Growling in gurnards gives an advantage when there is limited food resources. This growl lasts up to 3 seconds and consists of up to 3 sound pulses, and is the only vocalization produced by this fish and is one of their two main feeding strategies.

With growling being used in aggressive behaviours in dog species, it can be used as a predictor as to whether or not an individual will engage in further aggressive behaviour. Different body sizes in domestic dogs can produce different formants, which they can use to display their size and predict the size of others. Larger dogs are able to produce formants that appear to be much lower than smaller dogs, which in contrast produce higher formants. With this information, dogs are able to judge their opponent's size relative to their own and decide on what type of action they wish to proceed with during the encounter. Larger dogs are more likely to engage in more aggressive behaviour when their conspecific is smaller than them but less likely to interact with their conspecific if it is larger than them. This pattern of behaviour also applies to smaller dogs, which are less likely to interact with any other conspecific in any way larger than them (likely due to their distinct disadvantage of body size).

In bears, almost all vocalizations can be wrongly classified as a growl. Unlike cats and dogs, bears seldom truly growl; instead the fear-moans of a trapped or treed bear are often mistaken as a threatening growl. When bears are being intentionally aggressive, as in when hunting or when threatened, they will tend to remain silent or make short blowing noises.

There is an evolutionary aspect to growling as well, with crustaceans evolving over the years in various aspects. The ghost crabs use their gastric mill, which is composed of lateral and medial teeth, to imitate the sound of growling. The growling is used while the ghost crab takes an aggressive stance, which is followed by lunging, they also use their claws to produce a similar sound that is instead used in courtship.

Cat growling and hissing

Felids such as leopards and tigers also growl to signal territorial aggression, eliciting anti-predator responses from animals such as elephants. Similar to human interpretation of growling, elephants are able to distinguish the threat level based on the individual growl and will respond accordingly; elephants will retreat from tigers, but defend against leopards. Domestic house cats also growl, sounding like "brrrrrooowwww", usually followed by the typical hissing sound. In domestic cats, growling is a warning noise, implying unhappiness, annoyance, fear or other forms of aggression, and is a signal to back off. Cats may growl, similar to dogs, in the presence of other cats or dogs to establish dominance or to indicate they do not wish to interact with that individual. There is an environmental aspect to feline aggression with domesticated cats that were in environments that are agonist with their owners, were more likely to have aggressive behavior like growling towards their owners.

== Functions of non-aggressive growling ==
Growling may also function as a type of escape from predation as well as a warning signal to other conspecifics of close by predators. The Longsnout Seahorse (Hippocampus reid) uses a form of growling when under stress in the presence of a predator. They use their low-frequency growl to warn conspecifics of the predator currently attacking it, only showing this type of growl when it is being handled. Due to the low frequency this sound produces, it only works to warn others if they are near by. This type of behaviour still works in its favor as the growl is also accompanied by body vibrations that the seahorse produces, which is likely to deter the predator when it is handling the seahorse.

In Alligators (Alligator mississippiensis), a growl may be produced by females as a response to a "Headslap" display from males. The "Headslap" often involves antagonistic interactions between males and those that do not participate in antagonistic interactions will often lunge toward a female. In response to both the lunge and "Headslap", the female will produce the growl in order to project her sex and location. The growl serves as a signal to the male that his display has been recognized and so the female produces the growl in order for the male to know her location for mating.

Although horses have been raised as farm animals for many centuries now, they still retain their instinctual responses to predators. Farm raised horses were found to still have anti-predation reactions like being alert to growls of leopards from their original ancestral home.

== See also ==
- Death growl
- Roar
- Dog attack
- Bark (sound)
- Alveolar trill
- Voiced epiglottal trill
- Voiceless epiglottal trill
- Snarl
