= Snarl =

Sound, often a growl or vicious utterance

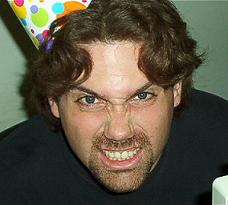
A facial expression which often accompanies a snarl

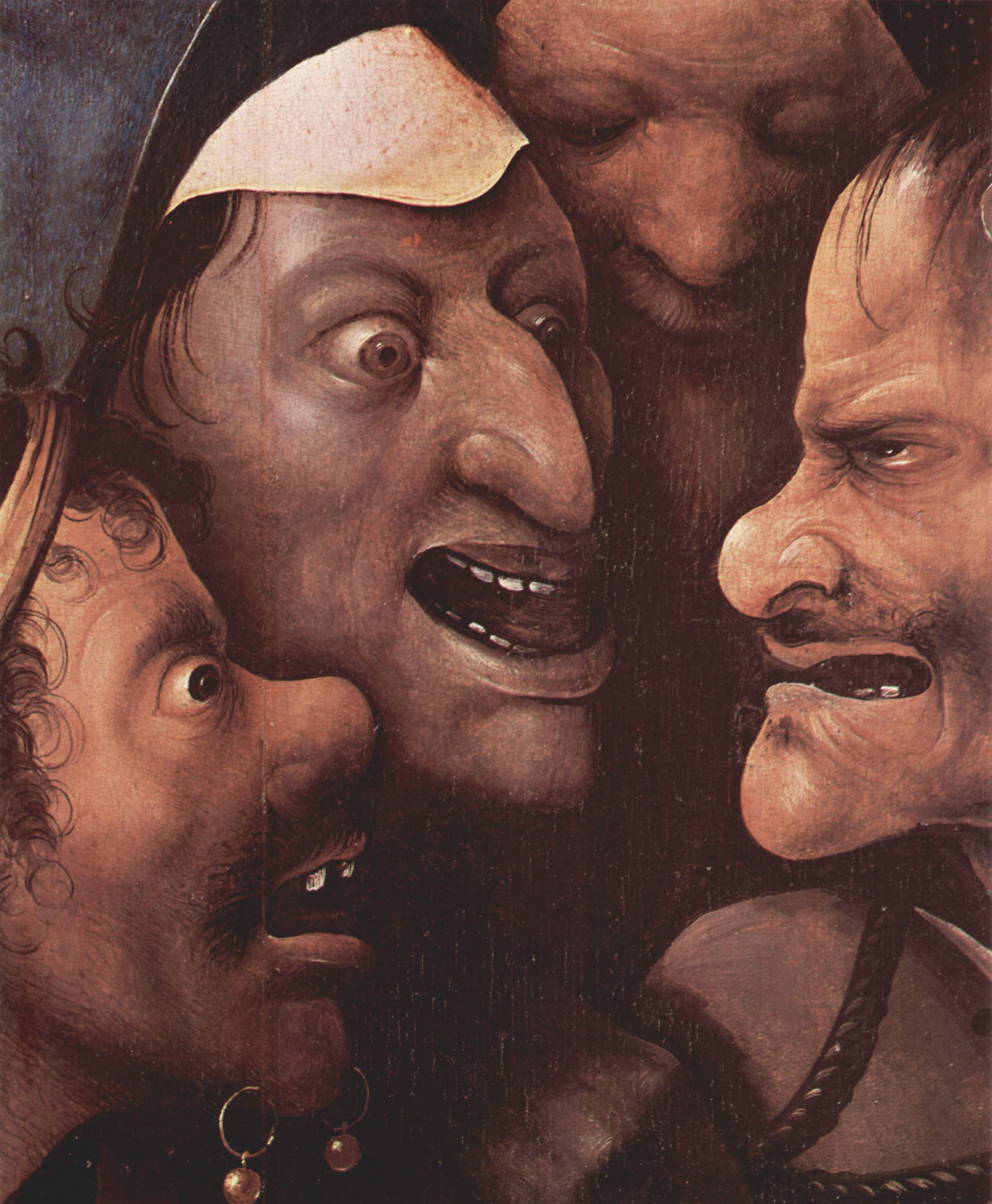
The figure on the far right has a facial expression commonly associated with snarling.

A snarl is a sound, often a growl or vicious utterance, often accompanied by a facial expression, where the upper lip is raised, and the nostrils widen, generally indicating hate, anger or pain. In addition to humans, other mammals including monkeys, rabbits and dogs snarl, often to warn others of their potential bite. In humans, snarling uses the levator labii superioris alaeque nasi muscle. The threatening vocalizations of snarling are often accompanied by or used synonymously with threatening facial expressions.

The word "snarl" is also used as an onomatopoeia for the threatening noise to which it refers, as in the 'snarl' of a chainsaw. This usage may derive from the common expression describing a dog as "growling and snarling". One literary use of "snarl" to mean a noise is in The Lord of the Rings in the encounter with the barrow-wight: "In the dark there was a snarling noise".
