= Blue Chairs =

2004 video game

- In-game screenshot
- Developer(s): Chris Klimas
- Publisher(s): Chris Klimas
- Platform(s): Microsoft Windows
- Release: WW: 2004
- Genre(s): Interactive fiction
- Mode(s): Single-player video game

Blue Chairs is an interactive fiction game by American author Chris Klimas.

== Plot ==
The piece opens at a party, where a man offers the player a bottle of a mysterious green fluid. After drinking it, the PC passes out, but is shortly awoken by a man bringing a phone message from a long-lost love. The game then explores the player's experiences of what may be a hallucination, and may be reality. Notable segments include a fantasy about being elected President in the desert, some "wine" which enhances dancing skills, and a network of tunnels hidden in the back of a freezer.

== History ==
The genre of Blue Chairs is considered to be a modern-themed interactive fiction. The designer of Blue Chairs is Chris Klimas, who developed the game using the Inform programming language designed by Graham Nelson. The game was released as freeware in 2004.

== Reception ==
Blue Chairs claimed the #2 prize at the Interactive Fiction Competition 2004, praised for its inventive style and rich storytelling. Subsequently, it received the awards for Best Game, Best Writing, and Best Story at the annual Xyzzy Awards. It was also nominated for Best Individual Puzzle, Best NPCs, and Best Individual PC. It was ranked as #34 in the 2011 edition of the Interactive Fiction Top 50 of all time. In 2016, author Adam Cadre analyzed Blue Chairs in his Radio K podcast.
