= Hunter, in Darkness =

1999 video game

Hunter, in Darkness is a 1999 interactive fiction game by Andrew Plotkin, written in Inform. It won the "Best Individual Puzzle" and "Best Setting" categories in the 1999 XYZZY Awards, and came in eighth overall in the 1999 Interactive Fiction Competition.

The game is inspired by Gregory Yob's seminal 1972 computer game Hunt the Wumpus. As in Hunt the Wumpus, the player's goal is to locate and defeat the title beast within its cave, but Hunter, in Darkness emphasizes the setting, describing the cave in much greater detail than the earlier work.

Plotkin states in the About section of the game:

This game was conceived of and fully outlined in early June of 1999.

And it was, too. All that discussion of compassless games, and mazes, and whether Hunt the Wumpus was really IF, made me giggle. I already had this on the drawing board. I didn't start any of that discussion, either -- although I contributed a few comments that I knew would turn out relevant.

The game features an experimental system of movement, being one of the few interactive fiction games where mapping is neither necessary nor useful. Instead of typing compass directions, players move between locations by following clues in their surroundings, such as sounds and locations of objects.
