= ADRIFT =

Graphical user interface for text adventures

- Original author: Campbell Wild
- Developer: Campbell Wild
- Stable release: 5.0 release 36 / September 12, 2020; 6 years ago
- Operating system: Microsoft Windows
- Available in: English
- Type: interactive fiction development and play
- License: BSD 3-Clause (BSD licenses)
- Website: www.adrift.co

ADRIFT is a graphical user interface used to create and play text adventures. The name is an acronym for "Adventure Development & Runner - Interactive Fiction Toolkit". The project was solely developed by Campbell Wild until he made it open source in 2018. Since then, only minor contributions to the main programs (Developer and Runner) have been given by others, though there have been contributions elsewhere to alternative Runners and the default Standard Library.

The toolkit consists of two programs; a developer (used to write games - known as the generator before ADRIFT 5), and a runner (used to play them), though the runner is available to download separately. In the current stable release (version 5.0.36), released in 2020, both programs only run on Microsoft Windows platforms as they are written in Visual Basic. ADRIFT started out as shareware. When ADRIFT 5 was released it became donationware until it became open source. For a while ADRIFT 5 was able to run on Linux using the Mono project but later updates did not work properly with Mono so these versions were skipped.

Coinciding with the 2011 Interactive Fiction competition, ADRIFT WebRunner was launched. This allows ADRIFT 5 games to be played online. Because the game runs server side, it allows games to be played on any device such as iPad. ADRIFT 5 went into Beta status as from 4 April 2011, where it became open for everyone to download.

Unlike many text adventure creation tools (such as TADS), the author needs little knowledge of how to program to use the ADRIFT Developer. Instead, the author is presented with a simple graphical interface with which to write their game. This allows for text adventures to be written more quickly by people who are primarily authors rather than programmers.

Two of the most critically acclaimed ADRIFT games to date are The PK Girl, which achieved 6th place in the Interactive Fiction Competition in 2002, and A Fine Day for Reaping, which took 7th place in the Interactive Fiction Competition and won the XYZZY Award for Best Story in 2007.

== Other Operating Systems ==
Because ADRIFT only natively runs on Windows, many users on other operating systems are unable to run the original software. jAsea is an open-source Java application that runs ADRIFT 4 games. It allows anyone with a Java-enabled web browser regardless of platform to play ADRIFT games. Development of jAsea was discontinued in 2004. However, SCARE is an ANSI/ISO C secondary clone of jAsea and the project has resulted in the ability to play ADRIFT games on several platforms including Linux, Windows, DOS, Macintosh and Amiga. SCARE has become a standard interpreter in most multi-interpreter programs such as Gargoyle and Fabularium. Fabularium, furthermore, comes with an ADRIFT 5 interpreter called BEBEK. Furthermore, ADRIFT 5 games can be played on Linux and Mac using a new interpreter called FrankenDrift.
