= Kaged =

Kaged is a work of interactive fiction written by Ian Finley, set in a dystopian alternative world influenced by Nineteen Eighty-Four and Kafka. It won the 2000 annual Interactive Fiction Competition, and, at least through 2008, was the only game written in TADS to win the competition since the Inform and TADS categories were combined in 1996. The game is a multimedia release with text and graphics, written in an HTML-TADS format.
