= Jim Aikin =

American writer (born 1948)

- Born: James Douglas Aikin; 1948 (age 77–78)
- Citizenship: United States
- Occupations: Editor; teacher; writer (music technology, science fiction)
- Writing career
- Notable works: Music Technology: Software Synthesizers: The Definitive Guide to Virtual Musical Instruments; Power Tools for Synthesizer Programming; Science fiction: Walk the Moons Road; The Wall at the Edge of the World
- Website: www.musicwords.net

James Douglas Aikin (born 1948) is an American science fiction writer based in Livermore, California. He is also a music technology writer, an interactive fiction writer, freelance editor and writer, cellist, and teacher. He frequently writes articles for various music industry magazines, including Electronic Musician, Keyboard Magazine, and Mix.

Aikin sold his first fiction story to Fantasy & Science Fiction where it appeared in the February 1981 issue.

== Bibliography ==
All titles listed chronologically.

=== Short works ===
- Cleaving, Amazing, November 1984
- Statues, Isaac Asimov's Science Fiction Magazine, November 1984
- Dance for the King, Omni, November 1984
- My Life in the Jungle, Fantasy & Science Fiction, February 1985
- A Place to Stay for a Little While, Isaac Asimov's Science Fiction Magazine, 1986
- Dancing Among Ghosts, Fantasy & Science Fiction, February 1988
- Run! Run!, Fantasy & Science Fiction, September 2008
- An Elvish Sword of Great Antiquity, Fantasy & Science Fiction, January 2009
- Leaving the Station, Asimov's Science Fiction, December 2009

==== Collections ====
- Beyond Armageddon (1985, "My Life in the Jungle")
- The Year’s Best Fantasy Stories 13 (1987, "A Place to Stay for a Little While")
- The Omni Book of Science Fiction 6 (1989, "Dance for the King")
- The Year’s Best Fantasy: Second Annual Collection (1989, "Dancing Among Ghosts")

=== Novels ===
- Walk the Moons Road (May 1985, ISBN 0-345-32169-3, Del Rey)
- The Wall at the Edge of the World (March 1993, ISBN 0-441-87140-2, Ace Books)

=== Interactive fiction ===
- Not Just an Ordinary Ballerina (1999)
- Last Resort (2006)
- Lydia's Heart (2007)
- Mrs. Pepper's Nasty Secret (2008, with Eric Eve)
- April in Paris (2008)
- A Flustered Duck (2009; winner of the Spring Thing)
- The Only Possible Prom Dress (2022)

=== Non-fiction works ===
- Power Tools for Synthesizer Programming (January 2004, ISBN 0-87930-773-0, Backbeat Books)
- A Player's Guide to Chords & Harmony (June 2004, ISBN 0-87930-798-6, Backbeat Books)
- Picture Yourself Playing Cello (2012, ISBN 1-4354-5868-0, Course Technology)
- Csound Power! (2013, ISBN 1-4354-6004-9, Course Technology)

=== As editor ===
- The Guide To MIDI Orchestration (3rd Edition, August 2004, ISBN 0-9646705-3-4, Musicworks Atlanta)
- Real World Digital Audio (2005-11-30, ISBN 0-321-30460-8, Peachpit Press)
