= Spring Thing =

Annual interactive fiction competition

Spring Thing is an annual competition highlighting text adventure games and other works of electronic literature, also known as interactive fiction, or IF.

The competition was founded by Adam Cadre, author of several works of interactive fiction, including Photopia and Varicella. Cadre first announced the Spring Thing in 2001, both to promote works that would be longer than those entered into the Interactive Fiction Competition, which is held every fall, and to encourage authors to submit works to the general public during other times of the year.

The competition first ran in 2002, with Cadre hosting it in both 2002 and 2003. Cadre did not host it the following year. After this year of inactivity, Greg Boettcher picked up the slack and hosted the Spring Thing from 2005 until 2013. During these years, the Thing became a mainstay of the parser IF community. Aaron A. Reed took over from Boettcher in 2014 and rebranded Spring Thing as a "festival" of interactive fiction in 2015. Reed managed the Spring Thing until 2022, when he passed off the competition to Brian Rushton, who has been organizing the event since.

As with the better-known Interactive Fiction Competition, works submitted to the Spring Thing must be released as freeware or public domain. Unlike the Interactive Fiction Competition, Spring Thing focuses on "bringing together new text games of all kinds: choice-based stories, gamebooks, hypertext fictions, visual novels, text adventures, narrative roguelikes, and wild new experiments" and does not feature rankings, but ribbons voted on by players. Entrants to the Main Garden segment of the festival may be nominated for the "Best in Show" ribbon, while all entrants are eligible for custom "Audience Award" ribbons. In the 2025 edition of the Thing, a new category was added to the Back Garden section—the New Game Plus category—with the intent of showcasing previously released games that have either been ported to a new system or else undergone significant expansion.

== List of winners to date ==
- 2002: Tinseltown Blues by Chip Hayes - the sole entrant in that year
- 2003: Max Blaster and Doris de Lightning Against the Parrot Creatures of Venus by Dan Shiovitz and Emily Short
- 2004: No competition
- 2005: Whom the Telling Changed by Aaron A. Reed
- 2006: De baron / The Baron by Victor Gijsbers
- 2007: Fate by Victor Gijsbers
- 2008: Pascal's Wager by Doug Egan
- 2009: A Flustered Duck by Jim Aikin
- 2010: No entrants
- 2011: The Lost Islands of Alabaz by Michael Gentry
- 2012: The Rocket Man from the Sea by Janos Honkonen
- 2013: Witch's Girl by Mostly Useless
- 2014: The Price of Freedom: Innocence Lost by Briar Rose
- 2015: Toby's Nose by Chandler Groover (Audience Choice and Alumni's Choice)
- 2016: Tangaroa Deep by Astrid Dalmady (Audience Choice), The Xylophoniad by Robin Johnson (Alumni's Choice)
- 2017: Bobby and Bonnie by Xavid and Niney by Daniel Spitz (tie for Audience Choice)
- 2018: Illuminismo Iniziato by Michael J. Coyne (Audience Choice and Alumni's Choice)
- 2019: Among the Seasons by Kieran Green and The Missing Ring by Felicity Drake
- 2020: 4x4 Galaxy by Agnieszka Trzaska, Hawk The Hunter by Jonathan B. Himes, and JELLY by Tom Lento and Chandler Groover
- 2021: The Weight of a Soul by Chin Kee Yong and Fish & Dagger by Grave Snail Games
- 2022: The Bones of Rosalinda by Agnieszka Trzaska and Fairest by Amanda Walker
- 2023: Protocol by 30x30 and Repeat the Ending by Drew Cook
- 2024: Social Democracy: An Alternate History by Autumn Chen and The Trials of Rosalinda by Agnieszka Trzaska
- 2025: Cut the Sky by SV Linwood and The Little Match Girl Approaches the Golden Firmament by Ryan Veeder
- 2026: Our Lady of Thorns by Joel Burton and Strings: a (bug)folk song by Tabitha & baezil

== See also ==
- Interactive Fiction Competition
- XYZZY Awards
