= Rendition (text adventure game) =

2007 video game

rendition
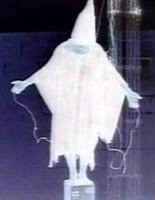
- Developer(s): nespresso
- Designer(s): nespresso
- Engine: Z-machine
- Platform(s): Z-machine
- Release: 2007
- Genre(s): Interactive fiction
- Mode(s): Single-player

Rendition is a 2007 work of interactive fiction by "nespresso", written using Inform 7 and published in z-code format, in which the player performs an interrogation of a suspected terrorist. The game describes itself as a "political art experiment in text adventure form". It was submitted to the 2007 Interactive Fiction Art Show in the "Portrait" category.

None of the seven judges at the art show reported enjoying the game, and many criticised its gameplay, though certain aspects of the game were praised. Jon Ingold stated that he stopped playing the game shortly after starting it, as he disliked the level of violence, though stated "I think this is all very powerful ... As a demonstration of the power - the impact - that a 'silly little text-game' can have, it works very well." Another judge stopped playing the game on the same grounds, though commented "in many ways this was a clever idea, a portrait of me and what I am willing to do." Another stated that whilst the game was "painful to explore, the concept [wa]s particularly well-suited to interactive fiction".

The game was subsequently chosen as game-of-the-day by playthisthing, where it was described by Emily Short thus:

It presents in a single atomic example the emotive power of complicity in gaming and interactive story-telling. When the player reaches the point of questioning his own involvement in a story, that story takes on a new significance, one which is not possible in non-interactive media.

She subsequently used the game, along with Photopia, as an example of an "approach to tragedy in interactive fiction" at the Association for Computing Machinery's Hypertext 2007 conference. It was further discussed in a lecture at Cambridge University by Jorge Nathan Matias on 5 November 2007, and was mentioned in a conference paper by Alex Mitchell and Nick Montfort for the 2009 Digital Arts and Culture Conference.
