= I-0 (video game) =

1997 interactive fiction video game

- Developer: Adam Cadre
- Engine: Z-machine
- Platform: multi-platform
- Release: 1997
- Genre: Interactive fiction

I-0, also known as Interstate Zero, is a piece of interactive fiction by American writer Adam Cadre about the adventures of a teenage girl hitch-hiking on an Interstate Highway (in this case the nonexistent Interstate 0). The main character is Tracy Valencia, a 17-year-old college student who is on her way home for Thanksgiving when her car breaks down, leaving her stranded in the middle of a scorching desert.

It won the Best Game and Best Individual Player Character awards at the 1997 Xyzzy Awards, and was a finalist for six other categories. The game was generally praised for its branching plot structure and multiple puzzle solutions. The game is available freely online.
