= Winter Wonderland (game) =

1999 video game; interactive fiction written by Laura A. Knauth

- Writer: Laura A. Knauth
- Release: 1999
- Genres: interactive fiction, children's, fantasy, seasonal

Winter Wonderland is a piece of interactive fiction written by Laura A. Knauth. The story is about the adventures of a young girl, named Gretchen, in a gentle and nonthreatening winter-themed fantasy land. It won the 1999 annual Interactive Fiction Competition.

== Awards and nominations ==
Competition	Year	Category	Rank	Score
XYZZY Awards	1999	Best Setting	Nominee	
5th Annual Interactive Fiction Competition	1999		1/37	7.41
Miss Congeniality Awards	1999		2nd Place (tie)	
