= Earth and Sky =

- Developer(s): Paul O'Brian
- Publisher(s): Self Published
- Designer(s): Paul O'Brian
- Platform(s): Z-machine, Glulx
- Genre(s): Interactive Fiction, Adventure
- Mode(s): Single-player

Earth and Sky is an interactive fiction trilogy written and produced by American author Paul O'Brian about the adventures of a brother and sister who gain superpowers while searching for their lost parents. Games in the series have won awards in the annual Interactive Fiction Competition and received an XYZZY Award.

== Earth and Sky ==
The first game begins a month after the disappearance of two scientists at the local university, Clair and Scott Colborn. After exploring their parents' lab, the playable character, Emily Colborn, and her brother Austin find that their parents had been developing suits that grant sky-themed and earth-themed superpowers. Using the suits, Emily gains the ability to fly, generate fog and shoot electric blasts. Adopting the superhero names 'Earth' and 'Sky', the siblings decide to search for their parents themselves and defend the campus from an accidentally mutated monster.

The game is entirely text based and players type commands to move through the story. The story file can be downloaded for free online and though O'Brian recommended using Frotz, Earth and Sky is compatible with several interpreter programs which are available as freeware. The game is also available for online play through O'Brian's web page.

=== Reception ===
The game received mixed reviews; it was commended for having entertaining, humorous and descriptive narratives but also criticized for its short length and use of a menu system in dialogue. Earth and Sky made its competition debut in 2001 finishing eighth at the 7th annual Interactive Fiction Competition making it the least successful game of the series.

== Another Earth, Another Sky ==
The second installment of the series continues the story with the player in control of Austin. The earth suit grants him super strength, the ability to jump high enough to go over buildings and some invulnerability to electricity. Soon after the events of the first game, the siblings follow-up on a lead and travel to Nevada. There, they discover a portal and venture through to explore an alien world in search of their parents.

Another Earth, Another Sky is longer than the first game and featured more puzzles as well as the option of using super strength to simply break through some obstacles. It was formatted utilizing Glulx to include comic style 'crash' and 'pow' images and is available online for free download.

=== Reception ===
It won the 8th Annual Interactive Fiction Competition and was second place for the Miss Congeniality Award in 2002. In the XYZZY Awards 2002, it won the XYZZY Award for Best Use of Medium and was nominated for the categories of Best Individual NPC, Best Puzzles, Best Writing and Best Game

== Luminous Horizon ==
The final game includes an optional component that offers alternate introductions based on what the player specified happened in the previous parts. It also features the ability to switch between Emily and Austin to utilize both sets of powers using the command >exchange. This changes the descriptive style allowing players to experience two different narrative perspectives.

It operates with Glulx and is available for free download with a virtual comic feelie summarizing the two previous games.

=== Reception ===
Luminous Horizon placed first in the 10th Interactive Fiction Competition in 2004 and was nominated for Best Individual PC and Best NPCs in the 2004 XYZZY Awards.

With this win, O'Brian became the first person (and as of 2022 one of only two people) to win IFComp more than once.
