= Floatpoint =

2006 video game

- Floatpoint being played in a modern interpreter.
- Developer: Emily Short
- Publisher: Self published
- Designer: Emily Short
- Engine: Glulx
- Platform: Glulx
- Release: 2006
- Genres: Interactive fiction, adventure
- Mode: Single player

Floatpoint is a 2006 work of interactive fiction written by Emily Short about a diplomat sent to an endangered colony to discuss evacuation options and terms of cohabitation. It is written in Inform 7 and won the 2006 annual Interactive Fiction Competition. Floatpoint also won 2006 XYZZY Awards for Best Settings and Best NPCs. The game was generally praised for its use of multiple endings.

== Plot ==
Through the course of play, the background to the current situation becomes clear. The colonists of Aleheart were originally exiled from Earth for engaging in prohibited genetic engineering. The colonists heavily engineer plant and animal life. The colony features plants engineered for artistic purpose. The colonists themselves are heavily genetically engineered. However, Aleheart is entering an ice age, which will likely make the planet uninhabitable within a few years.

After colonists left Earth, a plague caused massive depopulation on Earth. To help with recovery, the government of Earth wants the colonists to return.

The protagonist arrives on Aleheart expecting to be an assistant to the previous ambassador, but learns upon arrival that the previous ambassador has been dismissed and that the protagonist has been given the role. Officially the protagonist's goal is to convince the Aleheart colonists to return to Earth. This is to be done by making a formal gift to the colony's representative. Additional motivations including the colonists' desire to not return, and the reluctance of some Earth citizens to accept them give the protagonist difficult choices to make.

== Reception ==
In the 2006 Interactive Fiction Competition, Floatpoint had an average score of 8.4. That score is the highest of any Interactive Fiction Competition entry from 1999 through 2007. That score was topped in 2008 by Violet's score of 8.53.

A reviewer at Jay Is Games described Floatpoint as "a surprisingly detailed world ... with exquisite storytelling" The reviewer also described it as "well-paced" and that it "never feels stale."
