= Cryptozookeeper =

2011 interactive fiction video game

- Developer: Robb Sherwin
- Publisher: Robb Sherwin
- Designer: Robb Sherwin
- Engine: Hugo
- Platform: platform independent
- Release: 2011
- Genre: Interactive Fiction
- Mode: Single-player

Cryptozookeeper is an interactive fiction game written and self-published by American developer Robb Sherwin in 2011. Cryptozookeeper was written in the cross-platform language Hugo and runs on Windows, Macintosh OS-X, and Linux computers. Cryptozookeeper was released under a Creative Commons license and contains more than 12 hours of game play.

Cryptozookeeper combines both traditional elements of story-based interactive fiction while adding in fighting elements. In the game, players assume the character of William Ezekiel Vest and must splice together DNA samples to form a stable of fighting cryptids, all while solving puzzles in the off-kilter town of Christmas City. In an interview with BlueRenga, Sherwin described the game as "a game that lets the player assemble various DNA snippets that they pulled out in a Zork-style treasure hunt, into the various monsters of legend and cryptozoology. At the same time, I am hoping to have character interaction in the game that makes it familiar to people that have played some of my other wares."

== Gameplay ==
Cryptozookeeper is a "character-driven graphical text adventure" that requires players to enter text commands such as "go north" or "unlock door" to interact with the game. In addition to talking with the game's multiple non-player characters, players can also "Scan" the environment to obtain additional hints and information about their environment.

A large part of game involves collecting DNA samples and creating cryptids. The game includes 60 unique cryptids that can be created and trained for fighting.

== Releases ==
Cryptozookeeper was released as a free download under the Creative Commons 3.0 Attribution-Noncommercial-No Derivative Works 3.0 Unported license. The large (500 megabyte) game can be downloaded for free from multiple sources including the Internet Archive.

Additionally, for a limited time the game was available in a physical two-disc package that contained the following:

- A DVD containing:
  - A copy of the game
  - a Kindle-formatted foreword by Alex Gray
  - a game prologue story by Robb Sherwin.
  - the game's source code
  - all of the game's artwork
  - Hugo interpreters for Windows, Linux and OS-X.
- An audio Compact Disc containing new and in-game music by Bachelor Machines.
  - Speak Softly (4:25)
  - Clairvoyant by The Ambient Society, Bachelor Machines Edit (7:19)
  - Method Function, DJ Beatloaf Edit (4:54)
  - Posture Photos #4 – Counts Are Better (6:31)
  - Take My Picture (6:50)
  - The Zeroes (28:26)
  - Counts Are Better – Cryptozoology Mix (6:31)

== Reviews ==
In his review of the game, Rock, Paper, Shotgun writer Adam Smith called Cryptozookeeper "genuinely funny, creepy and clever."

Interactive fiction author and blogger Rob O'Hara referred to Christmas City (the game's setting) as "part-nightmare, part-dark comedy" and described it as a place where "the X-Files meets Nightmare on Elm Street: Part 3." In reference to the game's writing, O'Hara writes: "Like all of Robb Sherwin's games, the world of and characters within Christmas City are a conglomeration of pop culture references and technobabble. Sherwin entertains as earnestly as he offends. There are jokes about baseball and stigmata and trolls who edit Wikipedia entries. Not every joke sticks and I doubt everyone will get all the references (I know I missed some), but the ones I did get made me laugh. As with his previous games, Sherwin's strong suit continues to be his writing [...] From the text to the puzzles, Cryptozookeeper is a challenging game. It's a game that engages players on multiple cylinders. I'm guessing the subject matter, language, and puzzles may not strike a nerve with all IF gamers, but for the ones it does, Cryptozookeeper is a guaranteed good time."

Interactive Friction writer SnowBlood said Sherwin's "worlds are dark and unpleasant, yet filled with humor at every turn. His characters feel alive, with a sense that they continue to lead their lives both before and after the events in the game. It feels unlike any other text adventure, as if Sherwin has developed the game while remaining totally isolated from the modern "interactive fiction" community. This means that, for once, you are not a lonely NPC, wandering around an empty unpopulated world, finding scraps of "diaries" to uncover the backstory (because of your amnesia, natch). From the outset, you are meeting PCs, having long conversations (through a somewhat clumsy keyword-based conversation system), and many of these guys will actually join you, accompanying you for long swathes of the adventure. What's more, these characters are pretty dynamic, reacting to, and speaking about, your actions and the events going on around them. This isn't like dumb chatbots, spouting "quips" randomly and irrelevantly, this is actual conversation. Neither is it a glorified "hint system", nobody is talking about how you should be using the green key on the green door, they are far more likely to be insulting each other or the player-character. Yes, these are characters who are not necessarily "united by a common goal", but actually have antagonism towards each other. How often have you ever seen things like this in a text adventure game? It's the total opposite of the prevalent mode of "PC-Centred" game design, i.e. the world is a static toybox that only comes to life in the presence of the PC, the story progresses only through the action of the PC, and, like Zaphod Beeblebrox, the world only exists for the convenience of the PC. Sure, CRYPTOZOOKEEPER still follows this mode deep underneath, but it does a great job, better than any other text adventure I can think of, at hiding it on the surface."

SuperVerbose writer Paul O'Brian called Cryptozookeeper "the most Sherwin-esque Sherwin game I've yet seen. It's gonzo, it's funny, it's extreme, and it's shambolic, and it's all these things to the most highly refined degree I've ever seen Robb accomplish, which means it's all these things to the most highly refined degree I've ever seen anyone accomplish."

== Awards ==
In 2011, Cryptozookeeper won the following 5 categories in the XYZZY Awards:

- Best Game
- Best Writing
- Best Setting
- Best NPCs
- Best Individual NPC (Grimloft)

Cryptozookeper was also a finalist in the Best Story category.

In 2010, Cryptozookeeper won second place at IntroComp.
