= Winter Wonderland (disambiguation) =

"Winter Wonderland" is a pop standard written in 1934.

Winter Wonderland may also refer to:

== Music ==
- Winter Wonderland (Emilie-Claire Barlow album)
- Winter Wonderland (MU330 album)
- Winter Wonderland (Point of Grace album)
- Winter Wonderland (Paul Carrack album)
- "Winter Wonderland" (Shinee song), 2016
- ”Winter Wonderland”, a Thomas & Friends song written by Junior Campbell

== Other uses ==
- Winter wonderland, a type of Christmas fair held mainly in the United Kingdom
  - Hyde Park Winter Wonderland, an annual festival held in London
- Winter Wonderland (film), a 1946 American drama
- Winter Wonderland (game), a piece of interactive fiction by Laura A. Knauth
- Winter Wonderland (Portland, Oregon), annual attraction and light display
