= The Dreamhold =

The Dreamhold is an interactive fiction game by Andrew Plotkin, released in 2004. Its primary purpose is to be a tutorial to interactive fiction; because of that, the "core" of the game is relatively easy to finish.

To make it more appealing for seasoned IF players, Plotkin added an "expert mode", which can be activated early in the game and makes certain puzzles harder.

It won the 2004 XYZZY Awards for Best Puzzles and Best Use of Medium.

On June 24, 2014, the author released the source code for educational purposes.
