= Malinche Entertainment =

- Type: Private
- Industry: Video games
- Founded: 2002
- Defunct: 2015
- Headquarters: Matawan, New Jersey, U.S.
- Key people: Howard Sherman, founder
- Products: Interactive fiction including Pentari: First Light and The First Mile

Malinche Entertainment was an interactive fiction development and publishing venture founded by Howard Sherman in 1998.

== History ==
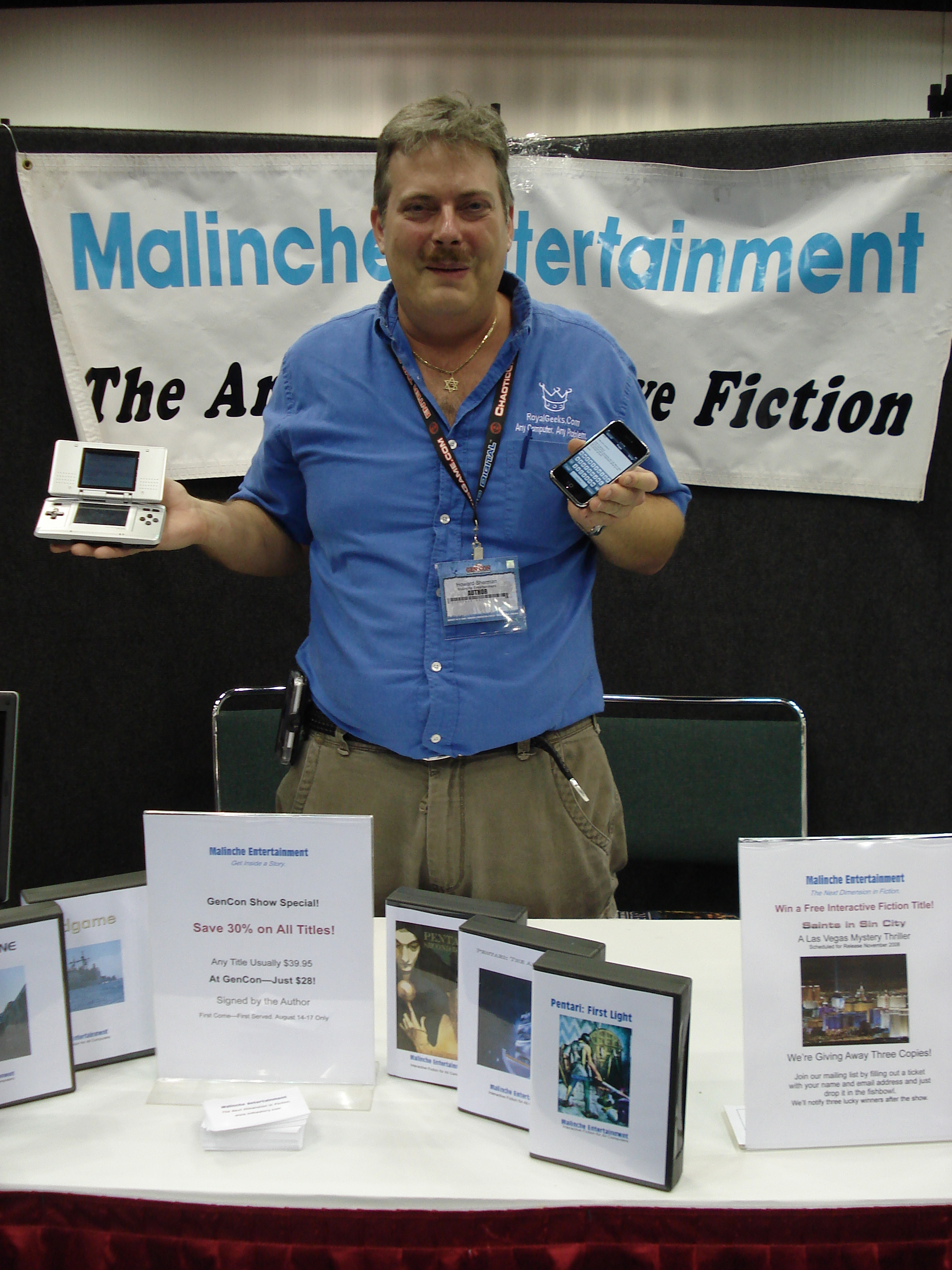
Howard Sherman representing Malinche Entertainment at Gen Con Indy 2008.

Prior to starting his own software consulting business and Malinche, Sherman was a senior vice president at national Internet service provider RMI.net overseeing two divisions while keeping close ties to the regional ISP he founded, Excaliber Internet Corp.

== Reception and criticism ==
Sherman's published games under the Malinche label include Pentari: First Light (March 2003, fantasy), Greystone (2003, murder mystery set in an asylum), Endgame (2004, suspense), The First Mile (2005, horror), and Pentari: The Apprentice (2007, fantasy). All of Malinche Entertainment's games are written by Sherman. They are written using Inform targeting the virtual Z-machine. Versions of some games were also available for iPods, using a hypertext interface. The games have also been ported to the Nintendo DS, personal digital assistants, and iOS and Android platforms.

Sherman stated that he markets his products to adventure gamers, the general fiction book market, and blind gamers.
