= 1893: A World's Fair Mystery =

2003 video game

- Developer(s): Peter Nepstad
- Publisher(s): The Illuminated Lantern
- Designer(s): Peter Nepstad
- Engine: TADS
- Release: April 24, 2003
- Genre(s): Interactive fiction
- Mode(s): Single-player

Screenshot

1893: A World's Fair Mystery is an educational work of interactive fiction by American author Peter Nepstad, written in the TADS programming language. It takes place during the Chicago World's Columbian Exposition of 1893. The exposition is recreated in detail, with archival photographs from the fair and in-depth descriptions detailing each of the few hundred locations.

An early text-only version won the 2002 XYZZY Award for Best Setting, and 1893 was declared runner-up for Games' Best RPG/Adventure 2004.

== Plot ==
During the 1893 World's Colombian Exposition, eight diamonds have been stolen from the exhibition pavilion of the fictional Kimberly Diamond Mining Company. Among them is one of the largest diamonds in the world that the mining company had bestowed to Queen Victoria, who then gave it to the exposition as a loan. The player assumes the role of a detective who investigates the case. The theft soon develops into a kidnapping case, and the player even has to investigate a murder.

== Reception ==
Specialist magazine Adventure Gamers pointed out that among all game genres only adventures enabled the player to retrospectively participate in historic events. Editor Evan Dickens praised an entertaining and well-written narrative and an authentic reconstruction of the exposition, but criticized that the open world game world that is accessible to the player from the beginning on might overexert inexperienced players. As a whole Dickens rated 1893 as "one of the most phantastic adventure games" he had ever played. Just Adventure noted a "solid story" that Nepstad had weaved across his reconstruction of the exhibition. Editor Ricardo Pautassi praised the interface and the characters of the game but criticized that the large open game world makes the player lose the overview over where to find certain items to solve the puzzles.
