= Savoir-Faire =

Video game

Savoir-Faire is a piece of interactive fiction written by Emily Short, about a magician in 18th-century France searching his aristocratic adoptive father's house. It won the Best Game, Best Story, Best Individual Player Character and Best Puzzles awards at the 2002 Xyzzy Awards, and was a finalist for four other categories. Puzzles in the game require the player to make "leap[s] of inference" between objects with similar functions. The game was generally praised for its unique use of magical powers (based on weaving links between similar objects, so that anything that happens to one happens to both) and its high-quality implementation. A mini-game follow-up, Damnatio Memoriae, was released in 2006.
