= Text Adventure Development System =

Programming language and IDE for interactive fiction

TADS
- Paradigm: prototype-based, domain-specific
- Designed by: Michael J. Roberts
- Developer: Michael J. Roberts
- First appeared: 1988; 38 years ago
- Stable release: Version 3.1.3 / May 16, 2013; 13 years ago
- Typing discipline: Strong typing, type inference
- OS: Amiga, BeOS, MS-DOS, Windows, Unix-like (Linux, Mac OS X)
- License: TADS 2 Freeware source code
- Website: www.tads.org

Text Adventure Development System (TADS) is a prototype-based domain-specific programming language and set of standard libraries for creating interactive fiction (IF) games.

== History ==
The original TADS 1 was released by High Energy Software as shareware in 1988, and was followed by TADS 2 not long after. From the late 1980s to early 1990s, free development tools such as TADS and Inform enabled amateur communities to create interactive fiction. In the mid-1990s, TADS was a top development tool for interactive fiction. At the time, it was a more improved tool for parsing and world building than existing systems like AGT (Adventure Game Toolkit).

TADS 2 syntax is based on C, with bits of Pascal. TADS 2 has been maintained and updated at regular intervals by its creator, Michael J. Roberts, even after it became freeware in July 1996. Graham Nelson, creator of Inform, describes Inform and TADS as the "only two systems... widely used" in the last half of the 1990s, and TADS has been called "The second most commonly used IF programming language today". Multimedia TADS, introduced in 1998, allows games to display graphics, animation and play sounds, if the platform supports it.

In 2006, TADS received a major overhaul with the release of TADS 3, which is a complete rewrite of the TADS engine, only retaining the platform-dependent code to ease porting. TADS 3 uses a language with a syntax that resembles C++ and Java. It has many new features, such as efficient dynamic objects (with automatic garbage collection), structured exceptions, native UTF-8 strings, and many useful function classes.

TADS 3 has been ported to MS-DOS, Mac, and Unix.

== TADS games ==
Games written in TADS are compiled to a platform-independent format that can be played on any computer for which a suitable virtual machine (VM) exists. Such virtual machines exist for several platforms, and in this respect, TADS closely follows the example of the original Infocom Z-machine, as well as modern languages such as Java and C#.

Whereas the TADS 1 and 2 VMs had to parse the commands entered by the player, before sending the results on to the game, TADS 3 employs a more general-purpose virtual machine, where the command-parsing is done by the game code itself, akin to Inform. The rationale for this is that it is easier to customize the parser.

=== Notable games developed in TADS 2 ===
- Uncle Zebulon's Will, by Magnus Olsson (1995). It won the TADS category at the inaugural 1995 Interactive Fiction Competition and was included on Activision's 1996 commercial release of Classic Text Adventure Masterpieces of Infocom.
- The Frenetic Five vs. Sturm und Drang, the first game in the "Frenetic Five" series by Neil deMause (1997). The game won a XYZZY Award for Best NPCs that year.
- Worlds Apart by Suzanne Britton (1999). Winner of XYZZY Award for Best Story and finalist in seven other XYZZY Award categories in 1999, the game features a huge amount of detailed worldbuilding.
- Kaged by Ian Finley (2000). Winner of the 2000 annual Interactive Fiction Competition.
- 1893: A World's Fair Mystery by Peter Nepstad (2002). The game is one of a handful to be released commercially in recent years, garnering attention from the New York Times and the Associated Press. It also won the 2002 XYZZY Award for Best Setting.

=== Notable games developed in TADS 3 ===
- Max Blaster and Doris de Lightning Against the Parrot Creatures of Venus by Dan Shiovitz and Emily Short (2003). Winner of the 2003 Spring Thing; a somewhat unusual example of multiple player characters (or PCs).
- The Elysium Enigma by Eric Eve (2006). Eve was awarded XYZZY Award for Best Game, XYZZY Award for Best Individual NPC, and took third place in the 2006 annual Interactive Fiction Competition.

== See also ==
- Interactive fiction#Development systems, lists software similar to TADS
- Inform The other leading IF development system
- Hugo The Hugo development system
