= Andrew Plotkin =

American programmer and writer (born 1970)

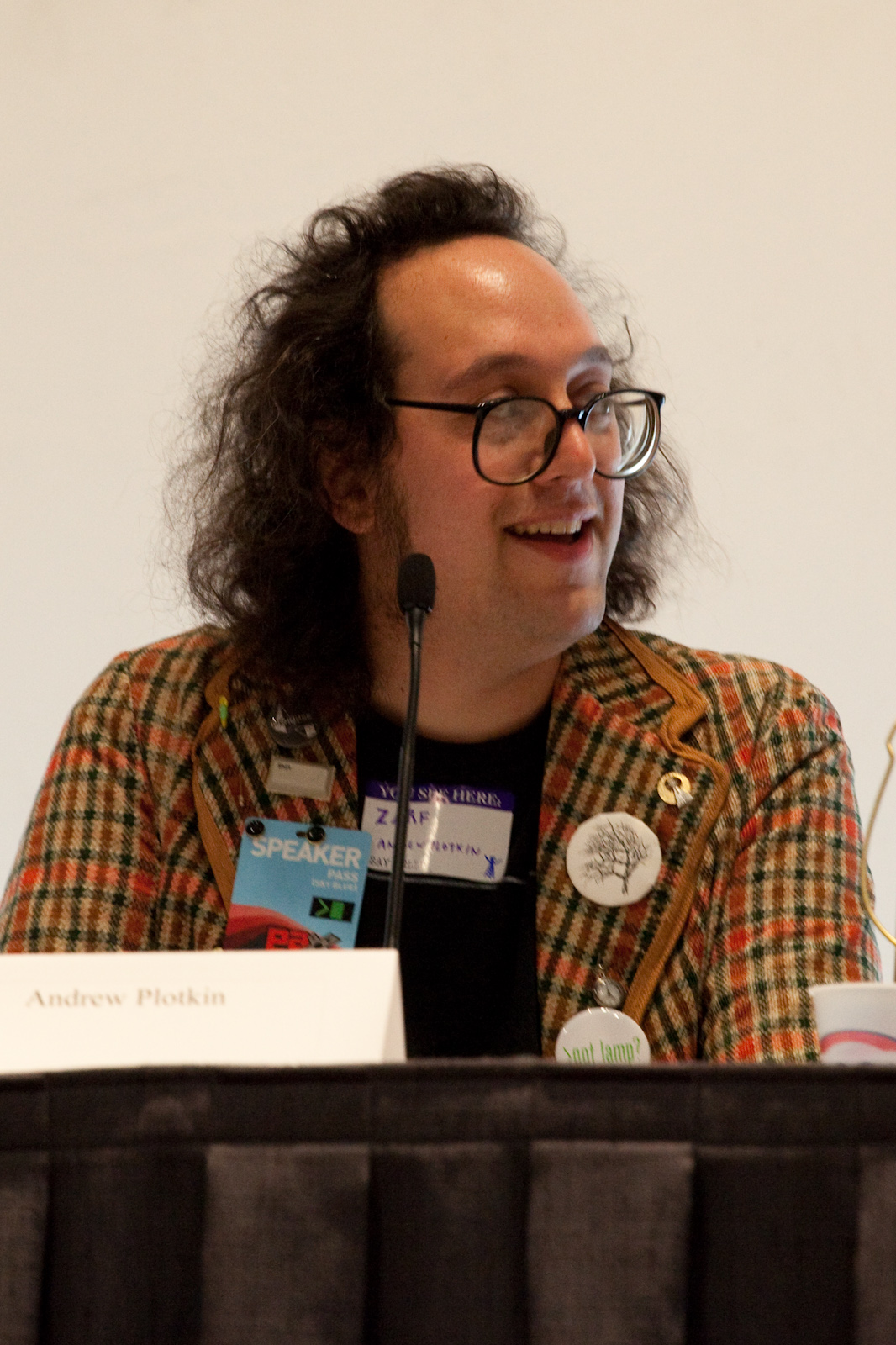
- Plotkin in 2010
- Born: May 15, 1970 (age 55); Syracuse, New York
- Other name: Zarf
- Occupations: interactive fiction writer, programmer
- Known for: System's Twilight (1994), Spider and Web (1998)
- Website: www.eblong.com/zarf

Andrew Plotkin (born May 15, 1970), also known as Zarf, is an American programmer and writer. He is a central figure in the modern interactive fiction (IF) community. Having both written a number of award-winning games and developed a range of new file formats, interpreters, and other utilities for the design, production, and running of IF games, Plotkin is widely recognised for both his creative and his technical contributions to the homebrew IF scene.

== Interactive fiction ==
Plotkin was one of the earliest writers to use Graham Nelson's Inform development system, and one of the first since Infocom's heyday to explore the boundaries of interactive fiction as an artistic medium. Many later authors cite him as a primary influence. He has won many awards within the community, and is frequently interviewed for magazine articles about interactive fiction.

Plotkin has also made major technical contributions to the interactive fiction medium, designing the Blorb archive format, the Glk I/O platform, and the Glulx virtual machine, and implementing Glulx Inform and several interactive fiction interpreters for the Macintosh and X. The Glk API has made possible the creation of "universal translator" interpreters such as Gargoyle, a single program capable of running all interactive fiction formats.

As of 2007, Plotkin holds two XYZZY Award-related records: for most XYZZYs won in one year (5, with Spider and Web) and for most XYZZYs won in total: 18. His most influential games are:

- Freefall (1995; Tetris clone – possibly the first so-called Z-machine abuse)
- A Change in the Weather (1995; winner of the 1995 IF Comp's Inform division)
- So Far (1996; winner of many XYZZY Awards that year, including for Best Game)
- The Space Under the Window (1997)
- Spider and Web (1998; winner of many XYZZY Awards that year, including for Best Game)
- Hunter, in Darkness (1999; winner of the XYZZY Awards for Best Individual Puzzle and Best Setting)
- Shade (2000; winner of the XYZZY Award for Best Setting)

Other Andrew Plotkin games include:

- Lists and Lists (1996), an introductory course in the Scheme programming language
- The Dreamhold (2004), a general IF tutorial game
- Delightful Wallpaper (2006; sixth place in IF Comp and winner of Miss Congeniality)
- Dual Transform (2010)
- Hoist Sail for the Heliopause and Home (2010)

More recently, he was featured on CNN Money for successfully raising over $31,000 using Kickstarter for development of a new interactive fiction piece called Hadean Lands for the iPhone and release of the resulting iPhone game framework as open source. Plotkin was also featured prominently in the 2010 interactive fiction documentary, GET LAMP.

On June 24, 2014, Plotkin released the source code for several of his games for educational purposes.

== Other work ==
He wrote the former shareware puzzle game System's Twilight. Plotkin appears as a character in Being Andrew Plotkin, an interactive fiction game by J. Robinson Wheeler based in part on the film Being John Malkovich.

While a student at Carnegie Mellon University, Plotkin was one of the early members of the Carnegie Mellon KGB. He created the organization's signature "Capture the Flag with Stuff" game, which is now played by several hundred students every semester.

In 1997, Plotkin developed a rethemed version of Dmitry Davidoff's social game Mafia, replacing the "mafia" characters with werewolves. Plotkin's version of the game subsequently became popular at universities and conferences in the United States, with a set of cards being produced by Looney Labs.

He has also made contributions to the Icehouse community, both in designing the game Branches & Twigs & Thorns, and the creation of several custom sets of pieces. During 2006 he was involved in the open source on-line game platform Volity and has created, or assisted in the creation of, on-line versions of the pyramid game Treehouse and other Looney Labs titles to showcase the platform.

In 2019 he created and co-chaired with Adri Mills NarraScope, a games conference focusing on interactive narrative, adventure games, and interactive fiction.
