= 9:05 =

2000 video game

- Developer: Adam Cadre
- Release: 2000
- Genre: Interactive fiction
- Mode: Single player

9:05 is an interactive fiction game developed by Adam Cadre in 2000. The story follows a man who wakes up and gets a call telling him to go to work, and it follows branching paths. The game is commonly used as a gateway to text adventure games because of its short length and overall simplicity and is used by English as a second language (ESL) teachers to help students attain mastery of English.

== Gameplay ==
The game uses a text input system to allow the user to control the actions of the player character (e.g. using "Open door" as a command to instruct the character to open a door). The entire game is text-based and takes around five minutes to finish.

=== Plot ===
In the fictional town of Las Mesas, the player character wakes up in a bedroom to a phone ringing next to him at 9:05 AM. On the phone, someone screams that he must come to work or he will be fired. The character changes out of his soiled clothes and, after cleaning up and passing through a living room described as lacking in luxuries, gets into a car. Arriving at the office of Loungent Technologies, he sits in a cubicle and fills out a form. When he goes to turn in the form to Matthew Bowman, the boss who had been on the phone earlier, Bowman does not recognize him, and the character is apprehended by security guards. The game ends with a news anchor reporting that the character is actually a burglar who killed Brian Hadley, the true homeowner, the previous night. He hid Hadley's body under the bed and stashed some of his valuables in the trunk of the car, then fell asleep in the victim's bedroom and tried to assume his career the next morning. The anchor says that the character likely will be seeking an insanity plea as the game states he has been sentenced to life imprisonment.

Using the knowledge of the character's real role in the story on subsequent playthroughs, the player can look underneath the bed to find Hadley's corpse, look in the car from outside to find the technological valuables from the living room in the trunk, and choose to flee in the car by freeway instead of going to the office. If the player chooses not to escape by freeway and instead continues down the city street, the character will die in a collision with another car attempting to take the onramp. If the player does none of the above for a certain number of turns, the character will die of internal injuries from a non-descript conflict the previous night.

== Development ==
The game was created by Adam Cadre in response to a Usenet thread about straightforward vs. oblique writing in interactive fiction. Cadre has written that the use of 9:05 as an introduction to interactive fiction "is pretty nifty, but is certainly not what I intended; I was just participating in an obscure doctrinal dispute".

== Reception ==
9:05 is commonly cited as an effective entry point to interactive fiction, and many critics have ranked it among the best interactive fiction games ever created. Jay Is Games's Jay Bibby called the game "enjoyable and surprising" and thought that it would be perfect for a casual audience. Rock, Paper, Shotgun's Adam Smith felt that it was a great entrypoint to interactive fiction. PC Gamer's Richard Cobbett praised the game for keeping the protagonist's true identity a secret until the end, showing how "toying with a single preconception can make for something incredibly clever". In Anastasia Salter's book on Adventure games, she calls 9:05 subversive and praises how it defies the player's expectations. In the book Writing for Video Games, 9:05 was listed as the second-most notable interactive fiction game.

English as a second language (ESL) teachers and classes use 9:05 as a way to teach the English language. Multiple lesson plans use 9:05 as a way for ESL students to contextualize verbs in a simple and engaging story. An ESL teacher in Portugal felt that 9:05's easy vocabulary and story made it simpler for students to engage with the material and use it after leaving school.
