= Xyzzy (computing) =

Term in computing

In computing, Xyzzy is sometimes used as a metasyntactic variable or as a video game cheat code. Xyzzy comes from the Colossal Cave Adventure computer game, where it is the first "magic word" that most players encounter (others include "plugh" and "plover").

== Origin ==
Modern usage is primarily from one of the earliest computer games, Colossal Cave Adventure, in which the player explores a cave with many rooms, collecting the treasures found there. By typing "xyzzy" at the appropriate time, the player could move instantly between two otherwise distant points. As Colossal Cave Adventure was both one of the first adventure games and one of the first interactive fiction pieces, hundreds of later interactive fiction games included responses to the command "xyzzy" in tribute.

The origin of the word "xyzzy" has been the subject of debate. According to Ron Hunsinger, the sequence of letters "XYZZY" has been used as a mnemonic to remember the process for computing cross products. Will Crowther, the author of Colossal Cave Adventure, states that he was unaware of the mnemonic, and that he "made it up from whole cloth" when writing the game.

== Usage ==
=== Operating systems ===
Xyzzy has been implemented as an undocumented no-op command on several operating systems; in the 16-bit version of CLI in Data General's AOS/VS, for example, it would typically respond "Nothing happens", just as the game did if the magic were invoked at the wrong spot or before a player had performed the action that enabled the word. The 32-bit version of CLI, in AOS/VS II, would respond "Twice as much happens". On several computer systems from Sun Microsystems, the command "xyzzy" is used to enter the interactive shell of the U-Boot bootloader. Early versions of Zenith Z-DOS (a re-branded variant of MS-DOS 1.25) had the command "xyzzy" which took a parameter of "on" or "off". Xyzzy by itself would print the status of the last "xyzzy on" or "xyzzy off" command.

When booting a Cr-48 from developer mode, when the screen displays the "sad laptop" image, typing "xyzzy" produces a joke Blue Screen of Death.

According to Brantley Coile, the Cisco PIX firewall had a xyzzy command that simply said "Nothing happens." He also put the command into the Coraid VSX to escape the CLI and get into the shell. It would announce "Foof! You are in a directory. There are files here." The new California Coraid management made the developers change the string to "/exportmode" and get rid of the "Foof!" message. Since regaining ownership of the Coraid software, the command is being returned to the system and now, in VSX release 8, the response is ">>Foof!<< You are in a debris room."

=== Application programs ===
Within the low-traffic Usenet newsgroup alt.xyzzy, the word is used for test messages, to which other readers (if there are any) customarily respond, "Nothing happens" as a note that the test message was successfully received. In the Internet Relay Chat client mIRC and Pidgin, entering the undocumented command "/xyzzy" will display the response "Nothing happens". The string "xyzzy" is also used internally by mIRC as the hard-coded master encryption key that is used to decrypt over 20 sensitive strings from within the mirc.exe program file.

A "deluxe chatting program" for DIGITAL's VAX/VMS written by David Bolen in 1987 and distributed via BITNET took the name xyzzy. It enabled users on the same system or on linked DECnet nodes to communicate via text in real time. There was a compatible program with the same name for IBM's VM/CMS.

xYzZY is used as the default boundary marker by the Perl HTTP::Message module for multipart MIME messages, and was used in Apple's AtEase for workgroups as the default administrator password in the 1990s.

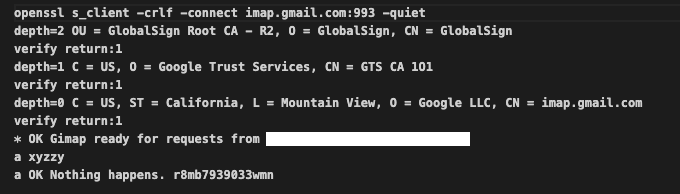
A command-line example demonstrating IMAP connection to Gmail

Gmail supports the command XYZZY when connected via IMAP before logging in. It takes no arguments, and responds with "OK Nothing happens."

Entering "*xyzzy*" into the search box in Google Messages for Android enables its debug menu system.

The Hewlett-Packard 9836A computer with HPL 2.0 programming language has XYZZY built into the HPL language itself with the result of "I see no cave here." when used. The same message is returned from HP 3458A and HP 3245A instruments when queried with XYZZY via the HPIB.

In most versions of the Ingres dbms, select xyzzy('') returns "Nothing happens." However, select xyzzy('wim') returns "Nothing happens to Wim". The xyzzy() function has been part of the Ingres product since at least version 5 (late 1980s), but was removed from the main codeline sometime in the early 2000s. While talking to one of the members of the Ingres development team, Wim de Boer, at that time the secretary of the Ingres Users Group Nederland (IUGN), mentioned the removal of this Easter egg. This developer, who was a frequent speaker at the events organised by the IUGN, managed to put the function back into the product and—especially for Wim—added handling for the 'wim' value of the parameter.

=== Other computer games and media ===
The popular Minesweeper game under older versions of Microsoft Windows had a cheat mode triggered by entering the command xyzzy, then pressing the key sequence shift and then enter, which turned a single pixel in the top-left corner of the entire screen into a small black or white dot depending on whether or not the mouse pointer is over a mine. This easter egg was present in all Windows versions through Windows XP Service Pack 3, but under Windows 95, 98 and NT 4.0 the pixel was visible only if the standard Explorer desktop was not running. The easter egg does not exist in versions after Windows XP SP3.

In the game Zork, typing xyzzy and pressing enter produces the response: "A hollow voice says 'fool'". The command commonly produces a humorous response in other Infocom games and text adventures, leading to its usage in the title of the interactive fiction competition, the XYZZY Awards.

In the 1994 game Road Rash, if the user were to enter "xyzzy" in the main menu, they could access several cheats such as nitrous refills, oil refills, etc.

In the 2022 game Return to Monkey Island the code is written on a sign at the entrance of a cave labyrinth. Ripping the sign off and using it in the cave, which leads to reading it, lets the protagonist, Guybrush Threepwood, return to the entrance of the cave.
