= Vespers (video game) =

2005 video game

Vespers is an interactive fiction game written in 2005 by Jason Devlin, that placed first at the 2005 Interactive Fiction Competition. It also won the XYZZY Awards for Best Game, Best NPCs, Best Setting, and Best Writing.

== Summary ==
Vespers is set in a 15th-century Italian monastery as a horror-themed morality game in which the player's decisions influence the ending. The moral implications of these decisions are often subtle and unethical actions are often encouraged by the game.

== Awards ==
Vespers has won the following awards:

- 1st place, rec.arts.int-fiction competition 2005
- Finalist, Best Individual PC, Xyzzy Awards 2005
- Winner, Best NPCs, Xyzzy Awards 2005
- Winner, Best Setting, Xyzzy Awards 2005
- Winner, Best Writing, Xyzzy Awards 2005
- Winner, Best Game, Xyzzy Awards 2005
- Finalist, Best Individual NPC, Xyzzy Awards 2005
- Finalist, Best Puzzles, Xyzzy Awards 2005
- Finalist, Best Story, Xyzzy Awards 2005

== Remake ==
Vespers3D was a planned but eventually cancelled adaptation of the game created using the Torque Game Engine. The written text interface was carried over from the original but the remake team are adding 3D animated graphics, voice acting and music. While a vertical slice or demo version neared completion around 2013, the project was cancelled before a commercial or full public release.
