= Zenobi =

UK video game developer

- Genre: Software
- Founded: 1986
- Founder: John Wilson
- Headquarters: Cutgate, Rochdale, Greater Manchester, United Kingdom
- Website: http://www.zenobi.co.uk/

Zenobi was a video game company that was known for its interactive fiction. The company was started by John Wilson in 1986 and continued in various forms until 2013. The company produced and published adventure games for the ZX Spectrum (along with the Atari ST) range of home computers, operating as a commercial entity from 1986 to 1997, selling the titles by mail-order. Zenobi's titles included adaptations of Jack the Ripper, Bored of the Rings, The Wonderful Wizard of Oz and Dr Jekyll and Mr Hyde. Emulator images were also available for PC and Amiga users. In its later years Zenobi concentrated on emulator users and produced numerous compilation CDs and DVDs.

On September 1, 2018, after a thirty-year hiatus, a Zenobi adventure game written by John Wilson, Ramsbottom Smith and the Quest For the Yellow Spheroid, was released for the ZX Spectrum.

John Wilson produced games for various platforms under the moniker Pension Productions until his death in 2021.
