= Lost Pig =

2007 video game

- Lost Pig being played in a modern interpreter.
- Developer(s): Admiral Jota
- Publisher(s): Self published
- Designer(s): Admiral Jota
- Engine: Z-machine
- Release: 2007
- Genre(s): Interactive Fiction, Adventure
- Mode(s): Single player

Lost Pig is a comedic work of interactive fiction about an orc retrieving an escaped pig. It was created by Admiral Jota and released as freeware. It took first place in the 2007 Interactive Fiction Competition with an average score of 8.27. Lost Pig won best game, best writing, best individual non-player character, and best individual player character in the 2007 XYZZY Awards. Lost Pig finished with 18.7% of the votes for the Audience Award in the interactive fiction category in the 2008 Jay Is Games Best of Casual Gameplay awards, placing it second after Violet.

The game has been described as "hilarious" by reviewers for The Onion A.V. Club and Jay Is Games. Emily Short described it as "superbly crafted," "insanely responsive," and recommended it to new players of interactive fiction, noting, "The polish is so thorough that it avoids the sorts of parser frustrations that usually catch novice players off-guard...." A GameSetWatch review noted that "After only a few minutes of play, however, it becomes pleasingly obvious how much effort has gone into creating Grunk’s world." The reviewer for Jay Is Games called Lost Pig "...stuffed to the rafters with personality."

The game's protagonist is Grunk, an orc who works at a farm. A pig under his care has escaped, and the game begins with Grunk looking for the pig. Chasing the pig, Grunk soon falls into an underground complex. To win the game, the player must get Grunk to capture the pig and find a way out of the complex.

As interactive fiction, the player types English commands into the game and the game responds in English. However, the protagonist, Grunk, speaks broken English. This means that the game's responses are frequently in broken English. A reviewer for The Onion A.V. Club notes that the broken English is "clever but never too cute" and that "[Grunk's] observations make a certain sense—and his matter-of-fact reporting has an awesome clarity...."
