= Varicella (video game) =

1999 video game

- Developer: Adam Cadre
- Publisher: Self published
- Designer: Adam Cadre
- Engine: Z-machine
- Platform: Z-machine
- Release: 1999
- Genre: Interactive fiction
- Mode: Single player

Varicella is a 1999 work of interactive fiction by Adam Cadre, distributed in z-code format as freeware. It is set in an alternate history which features roughly modern technology mixed with Renaissance-style principalities and court politics. The characters of Varicella use contemporary language from their home in a Renaissance castle, continuing the contrast between old and new. The player character is Primo Varicella, palace minister in Piedmont, who has to get rid of several rivals for the regency following the death of the king. He was inspired by the Machiavellian protagonist of Profit, but given even more despicable antagonists (just as variola is more virulent than varicella), thus making players willing to go along with his schemes. The international situation in the game is described in passing: Piedmont is part of a loose confederation of kingdoms that make up a Carolingian League and is engaged in a war against the Republic of Venice.

It won four XYZZY Awards in 1999 including the XYZZY Award for Best Game, and was nominated for another four. The game was discussed academically by Nick Montfort and Stuart Moulthrop in their 2003 paper Face It, Tiger, You Just Hit the Jackpot: Reading and Playing Cadre's Varicella, and by Dr. Wendy Morgan in her 2003 paper Touching (on) Character: New Engagements in New Media Narratives. Cadre himself claimed in a January 2002 interview that it was the best game he had written up to that point:

"Photopia has made more of a mark, I suppose, but Photopia is a short story; Varicella is a world. There are so many things to see and do… it's definitely the game of mine that I'm hoping that future pieces I might create will most resemble, in structure if not in content."

== Characters ==
- The main character Primo Varicella, the Palace Minister at the Palazzo del Piemonte. (Varicella is the technical name for chicken pox, while "Primo" can be translated from the Italian as "first", as he is the eldest brother)
- War Minister Klaus Wehrkeit is one of Varicella's rivals hiding in Piedmont, had recently been fighting the Venetians. If the player does nothing in the interactive fiction, Wehrkeit will arrive around 3 o'clock and kill Varicella. ("Wehrkeit" might be translated from German as "defenseness")
- Another rival, Christ Minister Pierre Bonfleche, is the tutor of the young Prince Charles. He is planning an invasion of Piedmont by the Avignese forces.
- Interior Minister Variola Modo is the scientist of the palace working with green slime in an underground lab. ("Variola" is the technical term for smallpox)
- Coffers Minister Argento Rico is another of Varicella's rivals, but does not appear that prominently in the storyline. He still needs to be killed. ("Argento" is Italian for "silver", while "Rico" means "rich")
- Your fifth rival is Prince Louis, an alcoholic who is found passed out on the garden bench.
- Sierra is the informant of the palace. If Varicella has money, some extra information can be gained from her.
- A character discovered later is Princess Charlotte, who is locked away within the palace due to her perceived insanity. She has been hidden away since the death of her fiancé, Varicella's youngest brother Terzio (from the Italian "terzo", meaning third).
- Marco Pulisci, the ambassador to Song dynasty, is deemed a non-threat by Varicella due to Hangzhou's distance from Piedmont.
