= Jeremy Freese =

American sociologist

- Born: Jeremy Jay Freese; March 15, 1971 (age 54)
- Education: University of Iowa; Indiana University Bloomington
- Known for: Violet
- Scientific career
- Fields: Sociology
- Institutions: Northwestern University; Stanford University
- Thesis: What Should Sociology Do about Darwin?: Evaluating Some Potential Contributions of Sociobiology and Evolutionary Psychology to Sociology (2000)
- Doctoral advisor: Brian Powell
- Website: www.boydetective.net

Jeremy Jay Freese (born March 15, 1971) is an American sociologist and author.

== Work life ==
Freese is a professor of sociology at Stanford University, where he is also the co-leader of the Health Disparities Working Group in the Stanford Center for Population Health Sciences. He previously served as professor of sociology at Northwestern University from 2007 to 2015, where he chaired the Department of Sociology from 2010 to 2013 and served as Ethel and John Lindgren Professor of Sociology from 2013 to 2015.

== Video game design ==
In 2008, he created the interactive fiction computer game Violet, which won the 2008 Interactive Fiction Competition and multiple awards.

== Blogging ==
Freese began blogging in 2003. In 2007, he was one of four sociologist bloggers profiled in the American Sociological Association's magazine Footnotes.
