= Stellar Agent =

1991 video game

- Developer(s): Robert Kraus
- Publisher(s): Better Games
- Release: 1991
- Genre(s): Adventure

Stellar Agent is a 1991 video game published by Better Games and designed by Robert Kraus.

== Gameplay ==
Stellar Agent is a text only adventure game in which the player selects actions from numbered menus, with screen divided by sections including "Location," "Description," and "Current Situation". It is a science fiction spy game with various options on-screen for each location. The game uses a menu-driven interface instead of a parser.

== Reception ==
Computer Gaming World said that "Robert A. Kraus has attempted to recapture the glory days of old [...] Stellar Agent puts the player square in a science-fiction spy adventure that is both enjoyable to read and play."

Charles Ardai reviewed the game for Computer Gaming World, and stated that "unpolished as it is, Stellar Agent also recalls the best of the early adventure game era: ingenious logic puzzles; multi-stage death traps; a robust and shameless mixing of science fiction, high fantasy and anything else that caught the designer's fancy; and, best of all, the anything-goes atmosphere of discovery and fun that characterized such classics as Starcross and the original Adventure." Ardai called the game "really no more than a collection of puzzles which are loosely strung together" but noted that the puzzles were "fine examples of their type and, to the delight of this puzzle-hungry player, there are a ton of them. Some of them are the kind of puzzle one doesn't see too often any more."

The PC Games Bible said that the game "Contains a few rough edges but remains an enjoyable adventure with some tough puzzles that are always logical."
