= Slouching Towards Bedlam =

2003 video game

- Developers: Daniel Ravipinto, Star Foster
- Publisher: Self-published
- Designers: Daniel Ravipinto, Star Foster
- Engine: Z-machine
- Platform: Z-machine
- Release: 2003
- Genres: Interactive fiction, adventure
- Mode: Single player

Slouching Towards Bedlam is an interactive fiction game that won the first place in the 2003 Interactive Fiction Competition. It is a collaboration between American authors Daniel Ravipinto and Star Foster. Slouching Towards Bedlam was finalist for eight 2003 XYZZY Awards, winning four: Best Game, Setting, Story, and Individual NPC (for the protagonist's cybernetic assistant, Triage). The game takes place in a steampunk Victorian era setting. Its title is inspired by a line from "The Second Coming", a poem by W. B. Yeats.

== Summary ==
The player character awakens in an office in Bedlam Asylum. From context it appears that the character is Doctor Xavier, a doctor at the Asylum. The Doctor, however, has no memory of his past. After investigation, it becomes clear that a now deceased patient, Cleve Anderson, has infected the player character with a mental virus known as the "Logos". The virus spreads by spoken language, taking the form of a glossolalic babble uttered by the vector. The patient tried to stop the spread of the virus by not speaking to others, not realizing that the player character (in the back-plot) was secretly listening in on the patient. Part of the result of being infected with the virus is that the character recognizes and has access to some ability to control time, as represented by the normally meta-game commands "undo", "save", "restore", and "restart". Throughout the game the player is given cryptic messages that come from the Logos. Investigation can optionally reveal that a secret society accidentally released the Logos while experimenting with magic.

The game has five distinct endings. There are three endings in which the virus is stopped; either by having the player character commit suicide before interacting with any other people (Ending A), by having the player character kill any characters he interacted with before committing suicide (Ending D), or by having the player character kill any characters he interacts with then waiting (Ending E). The virus's end is explained in the endgame for Ending E: the player character goes home and cuts out his own tongue – and asks all his written works to be destroyed, afraid that the Logos will reproduce by writing. There are two endings in which the virus spreads: the player character can willfully transmit the virus over a wireless broadcast (Ending C), quickly spreading it across the world, or the player character can simply infect several other people who will slowly spread the virus (Ending B). Each ending comes with an appendix that provides additional information on it.

== Authors ==
Slouching Towards Bedlam was Daniel Ravipinto's second publicly released game after 1996's Tapestry. Ravipinto works professionally as a computer programmer. Co-author Star Foster was a newcomer to writing Interactive Fiction. Foster worked professionally in marketing. She died in December 2006. The two both lived in Philadelphia and met there. They collaborated on design and development. The programming was done by Ravipinto.
