= Violet (video game) =

- Violet being played in a modern interpreter.
- Developer(s): Jeremy Freese
- Publisher(s): Jeremy Freese
- Designer(s): Jeremy Freese
- Engine: Z-machine
- Release: 2008
- Genre(s): Interactive Fiction, Adventure
- Mode(s): Single player

Violet is a work of interactive fiction by American author Jeremy Freese. It is a one-room puzzle game.

== Plot ==
The protagonist of Violet is a graduate student trying to write 1,000 words for his dissertation. The protagonist's girlfriend, Violet, threatens to leave otherwise. The protagonist faces a stream of distractions, including a window with a view of the campus, and a computer with access to blogs and webcomics. In the course of the game, the protagonist must "reconsider—and risk wrecking—" his career and relationship.

== Reception ==
A reviewer for The A.V. Club described the puzzles as "smart but logical" and "fit[ting] thematically into the story." The reviewer also called out the ability to disable "'heteronormativity,' so you can play as Violet’s girlfriend" as something that makes the game "Worth playing for". A second review also observes this option, noting that at least one puzzle changes based on the choice.

A writer for Jay Is Games called out Violet for "succeed[ing] in the difficult task of capturing the intricacies of a dynamic relationship." The writer also praised the game for succeeding at engaging the player at "the core emotional level", again noting how difficult this is. Emily Short, in a review on Jay Is Games, noted the strength of the implementation, pointing to the breadth of "interesting responses even to silly or unexpected actions." Short felt that the characters were "seemingly-real" and "their problem is plausible and serious."

== Wins and awards ==
It took first place in the 2008 Interactive Fiction Competition with an average score of 8.53. That score is the highest of any Interactive Fiction Competition entry from 1999 through 2012.

Violet was selected as the best interactive fiction game for 2008 by both the Jay Is Games staff and audience.

Violet took 35.1% of the vote in the Jay Is Games audience award, compared to 18.7% for the second-place winner, Lost Pig.

Violet won four awards in the 2008 XYZZY Awards: Best game, writing, individual puzzle ("Disconnecting the Internet in Violet/Getting rid of the key in Violet"), and individual NPC (Violet, the eponymous character).
