= Photopia =

1998 video game

- Developer: Adam Cadre
- Publisher: Self published
- Designer: Adam Cadre
- Engine: Z-machine
- Platforms: Z-machine, glulx
- Release: 1998
- Genres: interactive fiction, adventure
- Mode: Single player

Photopia is a piece of literature by Adam Cadre rendered in the form of interactive fiction, and written in Inform. It has received both praise and criticism for its heavy focus on fiction rather than on interactivity. It won first place in the 1998 Interactive Fiction Competition. Photopia has few puzzles and a linear structure, allowing the player no way to alter the eventual conclusion but maintaining the illusion of non-linearity.

== Development ==
Adam Cadre has stated that Photopia was heavily influenced by The Sweet Hereafter, a film that prominently features a babysitter and a bus crash.

He submitted Photopia to the 1998 Interactive Fiction Competition pseudonymously. He felt that his previous game I-0 would inspire certain expectations in players, since in that game the playable character is a young college student who could be instructed to undress. Years later, he dropped the pretense that there was a real "Opal O'Donnell" who had submitted Photopia for him, stating: "it started to bother me that v1.0 of the Phaq had lies in it."

== Reception ==
At the 1998 XYZZY Awards, the game won in the Best Writing and Best Story categories, and was nominated for Best Game, Best NPCs, Best Individual Puzzle, Best Individual NPC, and Best Use of Medium. In 1999, XYZZYnews gave the game a positive review, calling it an "amazing piece of work". In 2007, Emily Short described the game as "hugely influential" and "ground-breaking." In 2012, while reviewing Winter Lake's Rat Chaos, Short hyperlinked Photopia as a game that "plays with agency not in the usual ways [...] discovering you have none."

In 2015, the game won first place in the Interactive Fiction Database's "Interactive Fiction Top 50 of all time" contest.
