= XYZZY Awards =

Annual awards for works of interactive fiction

The XYZZY Awards are the annual awards given to works of interactive fiction, serving a similar role to the Academy Awards for film. The awards were inaugurated in 1997 by Eileen Mullin, the editor of XYZZYnews. Any game released during the year prior to the award ceremony is eligible for nomination to receive an award. The decision process takes place in two stages: members of the interactive fiction community nominate works within specific categories and sufficiently supported nominations become finalists within those categories. Community members then vote among the finalists, and the game receiving a plurality of votes is given the award in an online ceremony.

Since 1997, the XYZZY Awards have become one of the most important events within the interactive fiction community. Together with events like the Interactive Fiction Competition and Spring Thing, the XYZZY Awards provide opportunities for the community to encourage and reward the creation and development of new works within a genre that is no longer commercially lucrative.

The name of the awards comes from the magic word "xyzzy" causing teleportation from the popular early text adventure game Adventure.

== Awards ==
The awards have been presented in the following categories.

=== Best game ===
The game which is the most enjoyable as a whole; other awards recognize merit in particular qualities.

- 1996: So Far by Andrew Plotkin
- 1997: I-0 by Adam Cadre
- 1998: Spider and Web by Andrew Plotkin
- 1999: Varicella by Adam Cadre
- 2000: Being Andrew Plotkin by J. Robinson Wheeler
- 2001: All Roads by Jon Ingold
- 2002: Savoir-Faire by Emily Short
- 2003: Slouching Towards Bedlam by Daniel Ravipinto and Star Foster
- 2004: Blue Chairs by Chris Klimas
- 2005: Vespers by Jason Devlin
- 2006: The Elysium Enigma by Eric Eve
- 2007: Lost Pig by Admiral Jota
- 2008: Violet by Jeremy Freese
- 2009: Blue Lacuna by Aaron A. Reed
- 2010: Aotearoa by Matt Wigdahl
- 2011: Cryptozookeeper by Robb Sherwin
- 2012: Counterfeit Monkey by Emily Short
- 2013: Coloratura by Lynnea Glasser
- 2014: 80 Days by inkle and Meg Jayanth
- 2015: Birdland by Brendan Patrick Hennessy
- 2016: Superluminal Vagrant Twin by C.E.J. Pacian
- 2017: The Wizard Sniffer by Buster Hudson
- 2018: Bogeyman by Elizabeth Smyth
- 2019: Crème de la Crème, by Hannah Powell-Smith; and Zozzled, by Steph Cherrywell (tie)
- 2020: Vampire: The Masquerade — Night Road by Kyle Marquis
- 2021: What Heart Heard Of, Ghost Guessed by Amanda Walker
- 2022: According to Cain by Jim Nelson

=== Best writing ===
A game which rises above the others in the quality of its descriptive text.

- 1996: So Far by Andrew Plotkin
- 1997: Sunset Over Savannah by Ivan Cockrum
- 1998: Photopia by Adam Cadre
- 1999: For a Change by Dan Schmidt
- 2000: Metamorphoses by Emily Short
- 2001: Fallacy of Dawn by Robb Sherwin
- 2002: The Moonlit Tower by Yoon Ha Lee
- 2003: Narcolepsy by Adam Cadre
- 2004: Blue Chairs by Chris Klimas
- 2005: Vespers by Jason Devlin
- 2006: Delightful Wallpaper by Andrew Plotkin
- 2007: Lost Pig by Admiral Jota
- 2008: Violet by Jeremy Freese
- 2009: Alabaster by Emily Short et al.
- 2010: Hoist Sail for the Heliopause and Home by Andrew Plotkin
- 2011: Cryptozookeeper by Robb Sherwin
- 2012: Howling Dogs by Porpentine
- 2013: their angelical understanding by Porpentine
- 2014: With Those We Love Alive by Porpentine and Brenda Neotenomie
- 2015: Birdland by Brendan Patrick Hennessy
- 2016: Take by Katherine Morayati
- 2017: Eat Me by Chandler Groover
- 2018: Bogeyman by Elizabeth Smyth; Animalia by Ian Michael Waddell (tie)
- 2019: Crème de la Crème by Hannah Powell-Smith
- 2020: Jolly Good: Cakes and Ale by Kreg Segall
- 2021: Sting by Mike Russo
- 2022: The Absence of Miriam Lane by Abigail Corfman

=== Best story ===
The game with the deepest or most original story.

- 1996: Tapestry by Daniel Ravipinto
- 1997: Babel by Ian Finley
- 1998: Photopia by Adam Cadre
- 1999: Worlds Apart by Suzanne Britton
- 2000: My Angel by Jon Ingold
- 2001: All Roads by Jon Ingold
- 2002: Savoir Faire by Emily Short
- 2003: Slouching Towards Bedlam by Daniel Ravipinto and Star Foster
- 2004: Blue Chairs by Chris Klimas
- 2005: Beyond by Mondi Confinanti (Roberto Grassi, Paolo Lucchesi, and Alessandro Peretti)
- 2006: The Traveling Swordsman by Mike Snyder
- 2007: A Fine Day for Reaping by James Webb
- 2008: Nightfall by Eric Eve
- 2009: Blue Lacuna by Aaron A. Reed
- 2010: The Warbler's Nest by Jason McIntosh
- 2011: The Play by Deirdra Kiai.
- 2012: Howling Dogs by Porpentine
- 2013: Solarium by Alan DeNiro
- 2014: 80 Days by inkle and Meg Jayanth
- 2015: Birdland by Brendan Patrick Hennessy
- 2016: Foo Foo by Buster Hudson
- 2017: The Wizard Sniffer by Buster Hudson
- 2018: Bogeyman by Elizabeth Smyth
- 2019: Crème de la Crème by Hannah Powell-Smith; Turandot by Victor Gijsbers (tie)
- 2020: A Rope of Chalk by Ryan Veeder
- 2021: What Heart Heard Of, Ghost Guessed by Amanda Walker
- 2022: Fairest by Amanda Walker

=== Best setting ===
The most original or best-described locations.

- 1996: Small World by Andrew D. Pontious
- 1997: A Bear's Night Out by David Dyte
- 1998: Anchorhead by Michael Gentry
- 1999: Hunter, in Darkness by Andrew Plotkin
- 2000: Shade by Andrew Plotkin
- 2001: All Roads by Jon Ingold
- 2002: 1893: A World's Fair Mystery by Peter Nepstad
- 2003: Slouching Towards Bedlam by Daniel Ravipinto and Star Foster
- 2004: The Fire Tower by Jacqueline A. Lott
- 2005: Vespers by Jason Devlin
- 2006: Floatpoint by Emily Short
- 2007: Varkana by Maryam Gousheh-Forgeot
- 2008: Nightfall by Eric Eve
- 2009: Blue Lacuna by Aaron A. Reed; The King of Shreds and Patches by Jimmy Maher (tie)
- 2010: Aotearoa by Matt Wigdahl
- 2011: Cryptozookeeper by Robb Sherwin
- 2012: Counterfeit Monkey by Emily Short
- 2013: Robin & Orchid by Ryan Veeder and Emily Boegheim
- 2014: Hadean Lands by Andrew Plotkin
- 2015: Sunless Sea by Failbetter Games
- 2016: Cactus Blue Motel by Astrid Dalmady
- 2017: 1958: Dancing With Fear by Victor Ojuel
- 2018: Cannery Vale by Hanon Ondricek
- 2019: Heretic's Hope by Grim Baccaris
- 2020: Jolly Good: Cakes and Ale by Kreg Segall
- 2021: The Weight of a Soul by Chin Kee Yong
- 2022: Prism by Eliot M.B. Howard

=== Best puzzles ===
The most well-crafted, clever, and appropriate puzzles.

- 1996: So Far by Andrew Plotkin
- 1997: The Edifice by Lucian P. Smith
- 1998: Spider and Web by Andrew Plotkin
- 1999: The Mulldoon Legacy by Jon Ingold
- 2000: Ad Verbum by Nick Montfort
- 2001: First Things First by J. Robinson Wheeler
- 2002: Savoir Faire by Emily Short
- 2003: Gourmet by Aaron A. Reed
- 2004: The Dreamhold by Andrew Plotkin
- 2005: Distress by Mike Snyder
- 2006: Delightful Wallpaper by Andrew Plotkin
- 2007: Suveh Nux by David Fisher
- 2008: Gun Mute by C. E. J. Pacian
- 2009: Earl Grey by Rob Dubbin and Adam Parrish
- 2010: Aotearoa by Matt Wigdahl
- 2011: PataNoir by Simon Christiansen
- 2012: Counterfeit Monkey by Emily Short
- 2013: Coloratura by Lynnea Glasser
- 2014: Hadean Lands by Andrew Plotkin
- 2015: Sub Rosa by Joey Jones and Melvin Rangasamy
- 2016: 16 Ways to Kill a Vampire at McDonalds by Abigail Corfman
- 2017: The Wand by Arthur DiBianca
- 2018: Junior Arithmancer by Mike Spivey
- 2019: Zozzled by Steph Cherrywell
- 2020: The Impossible Bottle by Linus Åkesson
- 2021: Grooverland by Mathbrush
- 2022: The Bones of Rosalinda by Agnieszka Trzaska

=== Best NPCs ===
Appropriate, amusing, and well-written casts of non-player characters.

- 1996: Kissing the Buddha's Feet by Leon Lin
- 1997: The Frenetic Five vs. Sturm und Drang by Neil deMause
- 1998: Once and Future by G. Kevin Wilson
- 1999: Varicella by Adam Cadre
- 2000: Being Andrew Plotkin by J. Robinson Wheeler
- 2001: Pytho's Mask, by Emily Short
- 2002: Lock & Key by Adam Cadre
- 2003: City of Secrets by Emily Short
- 2004: Sting of the Wasp by Jason Devlin
- 2005: Vespers by Jason Devlin
- 2006: Floatpoint by Emily Short
- 2007: Child's Play by Stephen Granade
- 2008: Everybody Dies by Jim Munroe
- 2009: Broken Legs by Sarah Morayati
- 2010: Aotearoa by Matt Wigdahl
- 2011: Cryptozookeeper by Robb Sherwin
- 2012: Guilded Youth by Jim Munroe
- 2013: Ollie Ollie Oxen Free by Carolyn VanEseltine
- 2014: Creatures Such As We by Lynnea Glasser
- 2015: Birdland by Brendan Patrick Hennessy
- 2016: Cactus Blue Motel by Astrid Dalmady; Foo Foo by Buster Hudson (tie)
- 2017: The Wizard Sniffer by Buster Hudson
- 2018: Animalia by Ian Michael Waddell
- 2019: Zozzled by Steph Cherrywell
- 2020: Jolly Good: Cakes and Ale by Kreg Segall
- 2021: Lady Thalia and the Seraskier Sapphires by E. Joyce and N. Cormier
- 2022: Lady Thalia and the Rose of Rocroi by E. Joyce and N. Cormier

=== Best individual puzzle ===
The most inspired, well-crafted, and intriguing puzzle.

- 1996: Opening the gate, in So Far by Andrew Plotkin
- 1997: The language puzzle, in The Edifice by Lucian P. Smith
- 1998: Getting out of the chair, in Spider and Web by Andrew Plotkin
- 1999: The maze, in Hunter, in Darkness by Andrew Plotkin
- 2000: The whole game, in Rematch by Andrew Pontious
- 2001: Deciphering the language, in The Gostak by Carl Muckenhoupt
- 2002: Setting the traps, in Lock & Key by Adam Cadre
- 2003: The purple room, in The Recruit by Mike Sousa
- 2004: The time puzzle, in All Things Devours by "half sick of shadows"
- 2005: Following the murderer, in Beyond by Mondi Confinanti (Roberto Grassi, Paolo Lucchesi, and Alessandro Peretti)
- 2006: Navigating the mansion in Delightful Wallpaper by Andrew Plotkin
- 2007: Identifying the killer, in An Act of Murder by Christopher Huang
- 2008: Disconnecting the Internet/getting rid of the key in Violet by Jeremy Freese
- 2009: Finding out how the goggles work in Byzantine Perspective by Lea Albaugh
- 2010: Crossing the river in Aotearoa by Matt Wigdahl
- 2011: The hat mystery (also in Doctor M, Last Day of Summer, and Playing Games) in Cold Iron by Andrew Plotkin
- 2012: Surviving the fall in Bigger Than You Think by Andrew Plotkin
- 2013: Creating the meat monster in Coloratura by Lynnea Glasser
- 2014: The sequence of time-travel in Fifteen Minutes by Ade McT
- 2015: Understanding how the RPS cannon works in Brain Guzzlers from Beyond! by Steph Cherrywell
- 2016: Customizing the robot in The Mary Jane of Tomorrow by Emily Short
- 2017: Getting past the dragon in The Wizard Sniffer by Buster Hudson
- 2018: Solving your murder in Erstwhile by Maddie Fialla and Marijke Perry
- 2019: Inspiring the artist in Zozzled by Steph Cherrywell
- 2020: Leaving the house in The Impossible Bottle by Linus Åkesson
- 2021: The hair swap in The Libonotus Cup by Nils Fagerburg
- 2022: The escape room in The Little Match Girl 2: Annus Evertens by Ryan Veeder

=== Best individual NPC ===
A particularly well-implemented and well-written non-player character.

- 1996: The burin, in Frobozz Magic Support by Nate Cull
- 1997: Bob, in She's Got a Thing for a Spring by Brent VanFossen
- 1998: The interrogator, in Spider and Web by Andrew Plotkin
- 1999: Miss Sierra, in Varicella by Adam Cadre
- 2000: Galatea, in Galatea by Emily Short
- 2001: Yahoweh Porn, in Fallacy of Dawn by Robb Sherwin
- 2002: Boldo, in Lock & Key by Adam Cadre
- 2003: Triage, in Slouching Towards Bedlam by Daniel Ravipinto and Star Foster
- 2004: Audrey, in Necrotic Drift by Robb Sherwin
- 2005: The storyteller, in Whom the Telling Changed by Aaron A. Reed
- 2006: Leela, in The Elysium Enigma by Eric Eve
- 2007: The gnome, in Lost Pig by Admiral Jota
- 2008: Violet in Violet by Jeremy Freese
- 2009: Snow White in Alabaster by Emily Short et al.
- 2010: Dr Sliss in Rogue of the Multiverse by C. E. J. Pacian
- 2011: Grimloft in Cryptozookeeper by Robb Sherwin
- 2012: New Rat City in Rat Chaos by Winter Lake
- 2013: Captain Verdeterre in Captain Verdeterre’s Plunder by Ryan Veeder
- 2014: The Empress in With Those We Love Alive by Porpentine and Brenda Neotenomie
- 2015: Bell Park in Birdland by Brendan Patrick Hennessy
- 2016: The robot (variously-named) in The Mary Jane of Tomorrow by Emily Short
- 2017: Squire Tuck in The Wizard Sniffer by Buster Hudson
- 2018: The bogeyman in Bogeyman by Elizabeth Smyth
- 2019: Turandot in Turandot by Victor Gijsbers
- 2020: The parrot in The Magpie Takes the Train by MathBrush; Kingfisher in Vain Empires by Thomas Mack, Xavid (tie)
- 2021: Liz in Sting by Mike Russo
- 2022: Computerfriend in Computerfriend by Kit Riemer

=== Best individual PC ===
A particularly well-defined and well-written player character.

- 1997: Tracy Valencia, in I-0 by Adam Cadre
- 1998: The employee, in Little Blue Men by Michael Gentry
- 1999: Primo Varicella, in Varicella by Adam Cadre
- 2000: Rameses Alexander Moran, in Rameses by Stephen Bond
- 2001: The Kissing Bandit, in The Tale of the Kissing Bandit by J. Robinson Wheeler
- 2002: Pierre, in Savoir Faire by Emily Short
- 2003: The player character in Episode in the Life of an Artist by Peter Eastman
- 2004: Julia, in Sting of the Wasp by Jason Devlin
- 2005: Wendy Little, in Tough Beans by Sara Dee
- 2006: The player character in Delightful Wallpaper by Andrew Plotkin
- 2007: Grunk, in Lost Pig by Admiral Jota
- 2008: Hardy the Bulldog in Snack Time! by Renee Choba
- 2009: Lottie Plum in Broken Legs by Sarah Morayati
- 2010: Anthony Saint Germain in Death Off the Cuff by Simon Christiansen
- 2011: Mentula Macanus in Mentula Macanus: Apocolocyntosis by Adam Thornton
- 2012: Alexandra in Counterfeit Monkey by Emily Short
- 2013: The Aqueosity in Coloratura by Lynnea Glasser
- 2014: The PC in the uncle who works for nintendo by michael lutz
- 2015: Bridget in Birdland by Brendan Patrick Hennessy
- 2016: BEL/S in Open Sorcery by Abigail Corfman
- 2017: Fred Strickland in Will Not Let Me Go by Stephen Granade
- 2018: The Magpie in Alias 'The Magpie' by J. J. Guest
- 2019: Hazel Greene in Zozzled by Steph Cherrywell
- 2020: The doppelganger in Doppeljobs by Lei
- 2021: Marid in The Weight of a Soul by Chin Kee Yong
- 2022: Bell Park in The Grown-Up Detective Agency by Brendan Patrick Hennessy

=== Best use of medium ===
The category had no specific criteria given to voters; many chose to interpret this award as a recognition of particularly daring interpretations of the limits and abilities of interactive fiction, especially as regards the relationship between the player, narrator, and player character. This award was retired in 2010, when Best Implementation and Best Use of Innovation were introduced as replacements.

- 1997: The Tempest by Graham Nelson
- 1998: Spider and Web by Andrew Plotkin
- 1999: Aisle by Sam Barlow
- 2000: shrapnel by Adam Cadre
- 2001: The Gostak by Carl Muckenhoupt
- 2002: Earth and Sky 2: Another Earth, Another Sky by Paul O'Brian
- 2003: ASCII and the Argonauts by J. Robinson Wheeler
- 2004: The Dreamhold by Andrew Plotkin
- 2005: Mystery House Possessed by Emily Short
- 2006: The Baron by Victor Gijsbers
- 2007: Deadline Enchanter by Alan DeNiro
- 2008: The Moon Watch by Paolo Maroncelli and Alessandro Peretti
- 2009: Blue Lacuna by Aaron A. Reed

=== Best implementation ===
Introduced in 2010 along with Best Use of Innovation, to replace the Best use of Medium award. It recognizes "completeness of implementation, excellence in parser messages, etc".

- 2010: Aotearoa by Matt Wigdahl
- 2011: Six by Wade Clarke
- 2012: Counterfeit Monkey by Emily Short
- 2013: Trapped in Time by Simon Christiansen
- 2014: Hadean Lands by Andrew Plotkin
- 2015: Midnight. Swordfight. by Chandler Groover
- 2016: Superluminal Vagrant Twin by C.E.J. Pacian
- 2017: Eat Me by Chandler Groover
- 2018: Cragne Manor by Ryan Veeder et al.
- 2019: Ryan Veeder's Authentic Fly Fishing by Ryan Veeder
- 2020: The Impossible Bottle by Linus Åkesson
- 2021: The Libonotus Cup by Nils Fagerburg; The Weight of a Soul by Chin Kee Yong (tie)
- 2022: According to Cain by Jim Nelson

=== Best use of innovation ===
Introduced in 2010 along with Best Implementation, to replace the Best use of Medium award. It recognizes the "most innovative game".

- 2010: Aotearoa by Matt Wigdahl
- 2011: Kerkerkruip by Victor Gijsbers
- 2012: First Draft of the Revolution by Emily Short, Liza Daly, and Inkle Studios
- 2013: 18 Cadence by Aaron A. Reed
- 2014: Hadean Lands by Andrew Plotkin
- 2015: Laid Off from the Synesthesia Factory by Katherine Morayati
- 2016: The Ice-Bound Concordance by Aaron A. Reed and Jacob Garbe
- 2017: Harmonia by Liza Daly
- 2018: I. A. G. Alpha by Serhii Mozhaiskyi
- 2019: AI Dungeon by Nick Walton
- 2020: The Impossible Bottle by Linus Åkesson
- 2021: 4×4 Archipelago by Agnieszka Trzaska; Excalibur by J.J. Guest, G.C. Baccaris, and Duncan Bowsman; The Last Night of Alexisgrad by Milo van Mesdag (tie)
- 2022: The Bones of Rosalinda by Agnieszka Trzaska.

=== Best technological development ===
Recognizes "interpreters, authoring systems, libraries, utilities, and so on".

- 2010: Quixe, online Glulx interpreter by Andrew Plotkin
- 2011: TADS 3.1
- 2012: Vorple, user interface toolkit for Inform
- 2013: Twine 1.4
- 2014: Twine 2; Inform 7 6L02 (tie)
- 2015: Raconteur by Bruno Dias
- 2016: Ink
- 2017: Vorple for Glulx
- 2018: Dialog
- 2019: AI Dungeon
- 2020: Adventuron
- 2021: Gruescript by Robin Johnson
- 2022: Inform 7 build 10.1.0

=== Best supplemental materials ===
Outstanding non-game content ("feelies") created to accompany specific games. Eligibility is based on the year when the supplemental materials were released, regardless of the year of release of the game.

- 2010: Creating Interactive Fiction with Inform 7 (Aaron A. Reed)
- 2011: PDFs and screencast tutorials for Kerkerkruip
- 2012: Feelies for Muggle Studies
- 2013: Multimedia – Dominique Pamplemousse in "It's All Over Once the Fat Lady Sings!"

=== Best use of multimedia ===
- 2014: 80 Days by inkle and Meg Jayanth
- 2015: Secret Agent Cinder by Emily Ryan
- 2016: The Ice-Bound Concordance by Aaron A. Reed and Jacob Garbe
- 2017: Harmonia by Liza Daly
- 2018: Bandersnatch by Charlie Brooker
- 2019: Dull Grey by Provodnik Games; Heretic's Hope by Grim Baccaris (tie)
- 2020: Crocodracula: The Beginning by Ryan Veeder, Harrison Gerard
- 2021: Fish & Dagger by grave snail games
- 2022: Gent Stickman vs Evil Meat Hand by AZ / ParserCommander
