= Interactive Fiction Competition =

Annual competition for interactive fiction

The Interactive Fiction Competition (also known as IFComp) is one of several annual competitions for works of interactive fiction. It has been held since 1995. It is intended for fairly short games, as judges are only allowed to spend two hours playing a game before deciding how many points to award it, but longer games are allowed entry. The competition has been described as the "Super Bowl" of interactive fiction.

Since 2016 it is operated by the Interactive Fiction Technology Foundation (IFTF).

== Organization ==
In 2016, operation of the competition was taken over by the Interactive Fiction Technology Foundation.

The lead organizer 2014–2017 was Jason McIntosh, and in 2018 it was Jacqueline Ashwell.

== Categories ==
Although the first competition had separate sections for Inform and TADS games, subsequent competitions have not been divided into sections and are open to games produced by any method, provided that the software used to play the game is freely available.

In addition to the main competition, the entries take part in the Miss Congeniality contest, where the participating authors vote for three games (not including their own). This was started in 1998 to distribute that year's surplus prizes; this additional contest has remained unchanged since then, even without the original reason for its existence.

There is also a 'Golden Banana of Discord' side contest; the distinction is given to the entry with scores with the highest standard deviation.

== Eligibility ==
The competition differs from the XYZZY Awards, as authors must specifically submit games to the Interactive Fiction Competition, but all games released in the past year are eligible for the XYZZY Awards. Many games win awards in both competitions.

== Judging ==
Anyone can judge the games. Because anyone can judge and participate in the competition, there is a rule that "All entries must cost nothing for judges to play".

== Rules ==
The competition has rules for judges, authors and everyone to ensure that everyone agrees on the purpose, scope, and spirit of the competition.

== Prizes ==
Anyone can donate a prize. Almost always, there are enough prizes donated that anyone who enters will get one.

== Winners ==
The following is a list of first place winners to date:

- 1995: Tie: A Change in the Weather by Andrew Plotkin and Uncle Zebulon's Will by Magnus Olsson
- 1996: The Meteor, the Stone and a Long Glass of Sherbet by Graham Nelson
- 1997: The Edifice by Lucian P. Smith
- 1998: Photopia by Adam Cadre
- 1999: Winter Wonderland by Laura A. Knauth
- 2000: Kaged by Ian Finley
- 2001: All Roads by Jon Ingold
- 2002: Another Earth, Another Sky by Paul O'Brian
- 2003: Slouching Towards Bedlam by Star Foster and Daniel Ravipinto
- 2004: Luminous Horizon by Paul O'Brian
- 2005: Vespers by Jason Devlin
- 2006: Floatpoint by Emily Short
- 2007: Lost Pig by Admiral Jota (writing as Grunk)
- 2008: Violet by Jeremy Freese
- 2009: Rover's Day Out by Jack Welch and Ben Collins-Sussman
- 2010: Aotearoa by Matt Wigdahl
- 2011: Taco Fiction by Ryan Veeder
- 2012: Andromeda Apocalypse by Marco Innocenti
- 2013: Coloratura by Lynnea Glasser
- 2014: Hunger Daemon by Sean M. Shore
- 2015: Brain Guzzlers from Beyond! by Steph Cherrywell
- 2016: Detectiveland by Robin Johnson
- 2017: The Wizard Sniffer by Buster Hudson
- 2018: Alias "The Magpie" by J. J. Guest
- 2019: Zozzled by Steph Cherrywell
- 2020: Tie: The Impossible Bottle by Linus Åkesson and Tavern Crawler by Josh Labelle
- 2021: And Then You Come to a House Not Unlike the Previous One by B.J. Best
- 2022: The Grown-Up Detective Agency by Brendan Patrick Hennessy
- 2023: Dr Ludwig and the Devil by SV Linwood
- 2024: The Bat by Chandler Groover
- 2025: Detritus by Ben Jackson

Only two competitors have won more than once: Paul O'Brian, winning in 2002 and 2004, and Steph Cherrywell, winning in 2015 and 2019.

== Reception ==
A reviewer for The A.V. Club said of the 2008 competition, "Once again, the IF Competition delivers some of the best writing in games." The 2008 competition was described as containing "some real standouts both in quality of puzzles and a willingness to stretch the definition of text adventures/interactive fiction."

== See also ==
- Spring Thing
- XYZZY Awards
