= British Academy Games Award for British Game =

Video game award

- Awarded for: The best British game of the year, across all genres and platforms. Creative control and overall development must be led by a British development studio
- Country: United Kingdom
- Presented by: BAFTA
- First award: 2013
- Currently held by: Atomfall
- Website: www.bafta.org/games

The British Academy Games Award for British Game is an award presented annually by the British Academy of Film and Television Arts (BAFTA). It is given in honour of "the best British game of the year, across all genres and platforms. Creative control and overall development must be led by a British development studio.". The first ceremony to introduce the award was the 9th British Academy Games Awards in 2013, and was received by Fireproof Games' The Room.

Since its inception, the award has been given to four games, all from separate developers and publishers. As developers, Playground Games have been nominated the most times on five occasions. As publishers, both Sony Computer Entertainment and Warner Bros. Interactive Entertainment share the most nominations with four occasions each.

The current holder of the award is Atomfall, developed and published by Rebellion Developments, which won at the 22nd British Academy Games Awards in 2026.

== Winners and nominees ==
In the following table, the years are listed as per BAFTA convention, and generally correspond to the year of game release in the United Kingdom.

Table key
Indicates the winner

Year	Game	Developer(s)	Publisher(s)	Ref.
2012 (9th)	The Room	Fireproof Games		
2012 (9th)	Need for Speed: Most Wanted	Criterion Games	Electronic Arts	
2012 (9th)	Forza Horizon	Playground Games	Microsoft Studios	
2012 (9th)	Dear Esther	The Chinese Room		
2012 (9th)	Super Hexagon	Terry Cavanagh		
2012 (9th)	Lego The Lord of the Rings	Traveller's Tales	Warner Bros. Interactive Entertainment	
2013 (10th)	Grand Theft Auto V	Rockstar North	Rockstar Games	
2013 (10th)	DmC: Devil May Cry	Ninja Theory	Capcom	
2013 (10th)	Gunpoint	Suspicious Developments		
2013 (10th)	Lego Marvel Super Heroes	Traveller's Tales	Warner Bros. Interactive Entertainment	
2013 (10th)	The Room Two	Fireproof Games		
2013 (10th)	Tearaway	Tarsier Studios, Media Molecule	Sony Computer Entertainment Europe	
2014 (11th)	Monument Valley	ustwo Games	ustwo Studio	
2014 (11th)	80 Days	Inkle	Inkle and Profile Books	
2014 (11th)	Alien: Isolation	The Creative Assembly	Sega	
2014 (11th)	Forza Horizon 2	Playground Games	Microsoft Studios	
2014 (11th)	Geometry Wars 3: Dimensions	Lucid Games	Sierra Entertainment	
2014 (11th)	Lumino City	State of Play Games		
2015 (12th)	Batman: Arkham Knight	Rocksteady Studios	Warner Bros. Interactive Entertainment	
2015 (12th)	Everybody's Gone to the Rapture	The Chinese Room, Santa Monica Studio	Sony Computer Entertainment	
2015 (12th)	Tearaway Unfolded	Tarsier Studios, Media Molecule	Sony Computer Entertainment	
2015 (12th)	Until Dawn	Supermassive Games	Sony Computer Entertainment	
2015 (12th)	Her Story	Sam Barlow		
2015 (12th)	Prison Architect	Introversion Software		
2016 (13th)	Overcooked	Ghost Town Games	Team17	
2016 (13th)	Batman: Arkham VR	Rocksteady Studios	Warner Bros. Interactive Entertainment	
2016 (13th)	Forza Horizon 3	Playground Games	Microsoft Studios	
2016 (13th)	No Man's Sky	Hello Games	Hello Games	
2016 (13th)	Planet Coaster	Frontier Developments		
2016 (13th)	Virginia	Variable State	505 Games	
2017 (14th)	Hellblade: Senua's Sacrifice	Ninja Theory		
2017 (14th)	Monument Valley 2	ustwo games		
2017 (14th)	Reigns: Her Majesty	Nerial	Devolver Digital	
2017 (14th)	The Sexy Brutale	Cavalier Game Studios	Tequila Works	
2017 (14th)	Sniper Elite 4	Rebellion Developments		
2017 (14th)	Total War: Warhammer II	Creative Assembly	SEGA	
2018 (15th)	Forza Horizon 4	Playground Games	Microsoft Studios	
2018 (15th)	11-11: Memories Retold	DigixArt, Aardman, and Bandai Namco Entertainment Europe	Bandai Namco Entertainment Europe	
2018 (15th)	Red Dead Redemption 2	Rockstar Games		
2018 (15th)	The Room: Old Sins	Fireproof Games		
2018 (15th)	Overcooked 2	Ghost Town Games and Team17	Team17	
2018 (15th)	Two Point Hospital	Two Point Studios	Sega	
2019 (16th)	Observation	No Code	Devolver Digital	
2019 (16th)	Dirt Rally 2.0	Codemasters		
2019 (16th)	Heaven's Vault	Inkle		
2019 (16th)	Knights and Bikes	Foam Sword	Double Fine Presents	
2019 (16th)	Planet Zoo	Frontier Developments		
2019 (16th)	Total War: Three Kingdoms	Creative Assembly	Sega	
2020 (17th)	Sackboy: A Big Adventure	Sumo Digital	Sony Interactive Entertainment	
2020 (17th)	Dreams	Media Molecule	Sony Interactive Entertainment	
2020 (17th)	F1 2020	Codemasters		
2020 (17th)	Fall Guys	Mediatonic	Devolver Digital	
2020 (17th)	The Last Campfire	Hello Games		
2020 (17th)	Röki	Polygon Treehouse	United Label	
2021 (18th)	Forza Horizon 5	Playground Games	Xbox Game Studios	
2021 (18th)	Alba: A Wildlife Adventure	Ustwo Games		
2021 (18th)	Death's Door	Acid Nerve	Devolver Digital	
2021 (18th)	Fights in Tight Spaces	Ground Shatter	Mode 7 Games	
2021 (18th)	Overboard!	Inkle Studios		
2021 (18th)	Sable	Shedworks	Raw Fury	
2022 (19th)	Rollerdrome	Roll7	Private Division	
2022 (19th)	OlliOlli World	Roll7	Private Division	
2022 (19th)	Citizen Sleeper	Jump Over the Age	Fellow Traveller	
2022 (19th)	Total War: Warhammer III	Creative Assembly	Sega	
2022 (19th)	Two Point Campus	Two Point Studios	Sega	
2022 (19th)	Vampire Survivors	Poncle		
2023 (20th)	Viewfinder	Sad Owl Studios	Thunderful Group	
2023 (20th)	Cassette Beasts	Bytten Studios	Raw Fury	
2023 (20th)	Dead Island 2	Dambuster Studios	Plaion	
2023 (20th)	Disney Illusion Island	Dlala Studios	Disney	
2023 (20th)	Football Manager 2024	Sports Interactive	Sega Europe	
2023 (20th)	Warhammer Age of Sigmar: Realms of Ruin	Frontier Developments		
2024 (21st)	Thank Goodness You're Here!	Coal Supper	Panic Inc.	
2024 (21st)	A Highland Song	Inkle		
2024 (21st)	Lego Horizon Adventures	Guerrilla Games	Studio Gobo	
2024 (21st)	Paper Trail	Newfangled Games		
2024 (21st)	Senua's Saga: Hellblade II	Ninja Theory	Xbox Game Studios	
2024 (21st)	Still Wakes the Deep	The Chinese Room	Secret Mode	
2025 (22nd)	Atomfall	Rebellion Developments		
2025 (22nd)	Citizen Sleeper 2: Starward Vector	Jump Over the Age	Fellow Traveller	
2025 (22nd)	Mafia: The Old Country	Hangar 13	2K	
2025 (22nd)	Monument Valley 3	Ustwo Games		
2025 (22nd)	PowerWash Simulator 2	FuturLab		
2025 (22nd)	Two Point Museum	Two Point Studios	Sega	

== Multiple wins and nominations ==
=== Developers ===
The following developers received two or more British Game nominations:

Nominations	Developer
5	Playground Games
4	Inkle
3	Fireproof Games
3	Media Molecule
3	Ninja Theory
3	The Chinese Room
3	ustwo
2	Frontier Developments
2	Hello Games
2	Rocksteady Studios
2	Roll7
2	Tarsier Studios
2	Traveller's Tales

=== Publishers ===
The following publishers received two or more British Game nominations:

Nominations	Publisher
6	Sony Interactive Entertainment
4	Devolver Digital
4	Warner Bros. Interactive Entertainment
3	Fireproof Games
3	Microsoft Studios
2	Codemasters
2	Frontier Developments
2	Rockstar Games
2	Xbox Game Studios
