= 11th British Academy Games Awards =

Game award ceremony in 2015

- Date: 12 March 2015
- Location: Tobacco Dock
- Hosted by: Rufus Hound
- Best Game: Destiny
- Most awards: Monument Valley and The Last of Us: Left Behind (2)
- Most nominations: Alien: Isolation (6)

The 11th British Academy Video Games Awards ceremony, presented by the British Academy of Film and Television Arts (BAFTA), honored video games of 2014 and took place on 12 March 2015 at the Tobacco Dock in London, beginning at 7:00pm (GMT). During the ceremony, BAFTA presented awards in 16 categories. The ceremony, broadcast live on streaming website Twitch, was hosted by comedian Rufus Hound.

Monument Valley and The Last of Us: Left Behind won two awards each, while Destiny won the Best Game award. Other winners included Alien: Isolation, Far Cry 4, Hearthstone: Heroes of Warcraft, League of Legends, Lumino City, Minecraft, Never Alone, OlliOlli, The Vanishing of Ethan Carter and Valiant Hearts: The Great War.

== Winners and nominees ==
The nominees for the 11th British Academy Video Games Awards were announced on 10 February 2015 at 10:30am (GMT). Alien: Isolation received the most nominations with six total; Far Cry 4 and Monument Valley tied for second with five nominations each, followed by 80 Days, Destiny, Mario Kart 8 and Middle-earth: Shadow of Mordor with four each.

The winners were announced during the awards ceremony on 12 March 2015. Destiny's win for Best Game was the fourth BAFTA win for developer Bungie, but their first outside of the Halo series. Ashley Johnson won the award for Performer for the second consecutive year for her portrayal of Ellie in The Last of Us: Left Behind.

=== Awards ===
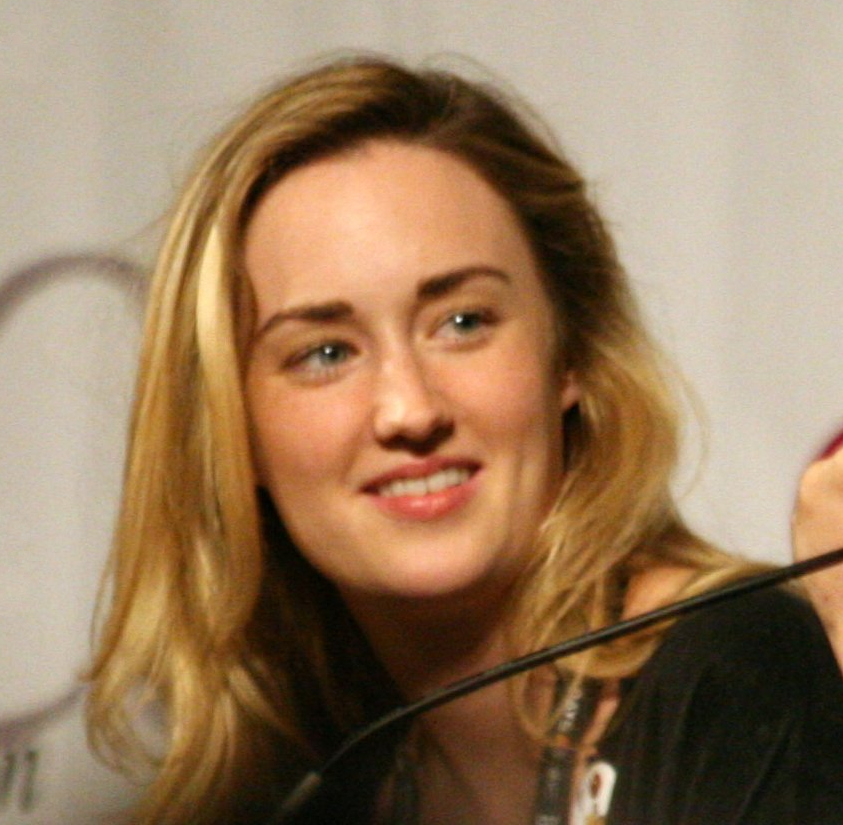
Ashley Johnson, winner of the Performer award.

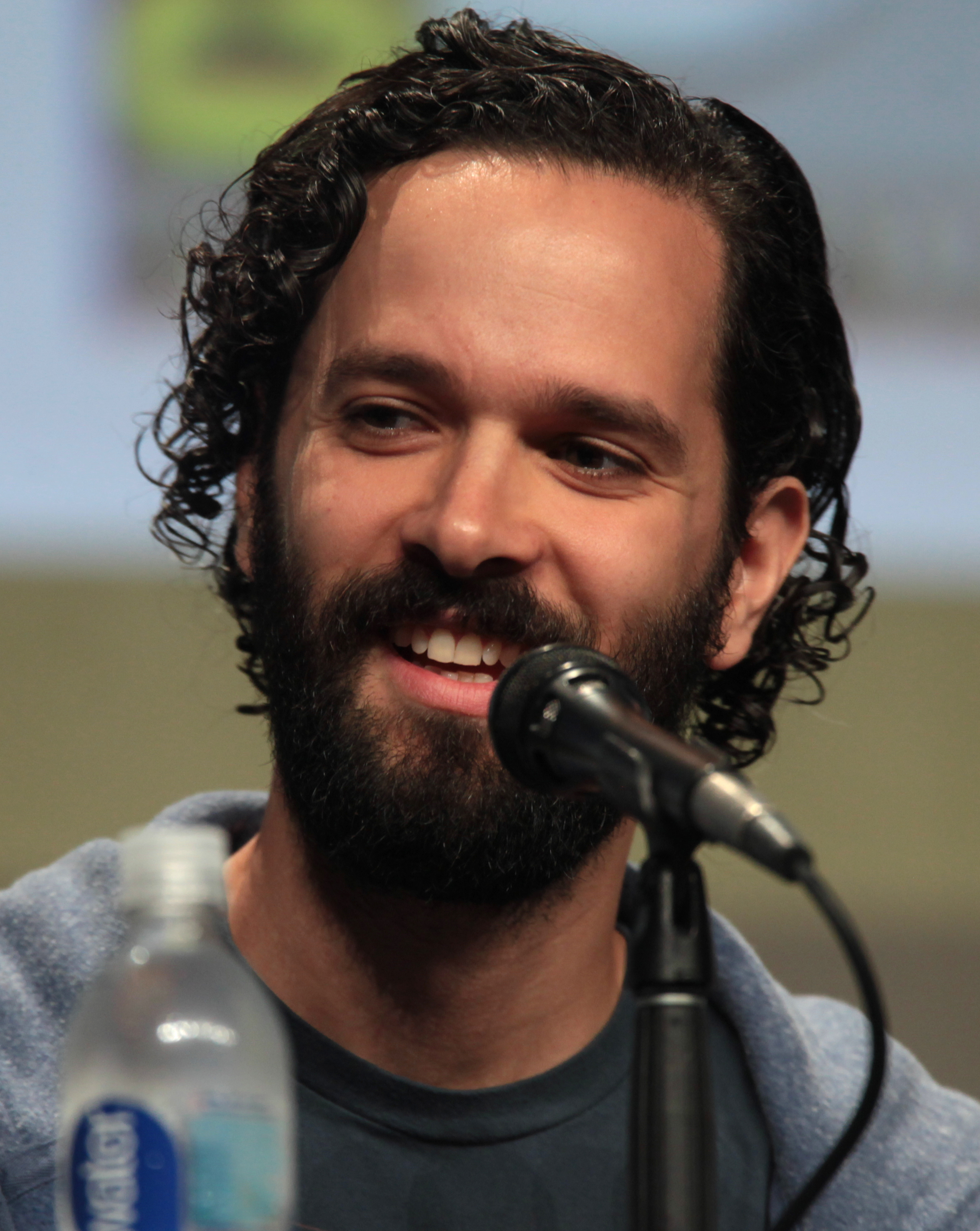
Neil Druckmann, winner of the Story award.

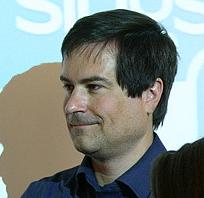
David Braben, winner of the Fellowship award.

Winners are shown first in bold.

**Artistic Achievement**: **Lumino City – State of Play Games/State of Play Games**; Assassin's Creed Unity – Ubisoft/Ubisoft; Far Cry 4 – Jean-Alexis Doyon, David Wilkinson and Scott Mitchell, Ubisoft/Ubisoft; Hohokum – Honeyslug and Santa Monica Studio/Sony Computer Entertainment Europe; Monument Valley – ustwo Games/ustwo Studio; Valiant Hearts: The Great War – Paul Tumelaire, Ghislain Avrillon and Laurent Labouille, Ubisoft/Ubisoft	**Mobile & Handheld**: **Monument Valley – ustwo Games/ustwo Studio**; 80 Days – Joseph Humfrey and Jon Ingold, Inkle/Inkle and Profile Books; Hearthstone: Heroes of Warcraft – Blizzard Entertainment/Blizzard Entertainment; Hitman Go – Daniel Lutz, Square Enix Montréal/Square Enix; Threes! – Asher Vollmer, Greg Wohlwend and Jimmy Hinson, Sirvo/Sirvo; The Walking Dead: Season Two – Telltale Games/Telltale Games
**Audio Achievement**: **Alien: Isolation – The Creative Assembly/Sega**; The Banner Saga – Austin Wintory, Michael Theiler and Peret Von Sturmer, Stoic Studios/Versus Evil; Call of Duty: Advanced Warfare – Sledgehammer Games/Activision; Fantasia: Music Evolved – Disney Interactive Studios and Harmonix Music Systems/Disney Interactive Studios; Mario Kart 8 – Nintendo/Nintendo; The Sailor's Dream – Simogo/Simogo	**Multiplayer**: **Hearthstone: Heroes of Warcraft – Blizzard Entertainment/Blizzard Entertainment**; Call of Duty: Advanced Warfare – Sledgehammer Games/Activision; Destiny – Bungie/Activision; Mario Kart 8 – Nintendo/Nintendo; Minecraft: Console Editions – Mojang/4J Studios/Microsoft Studios; Titanfall – Steve Fukuda, Richard Baker and Vince Zampella, Respawn Entertainment/Electronic Arts
**Best Game**: **Destiny – Bungie/Activision**; Alien: Isolation – The Creative Assembly/Sega; Dragon Age: Inquisition – BioWare/Electronic Arts; Mario Kart 8 – Nintendo/Nintendo; Middle-earth: Shadow of Mordor – Monolith Productions/Warner Bros. Interactive Entertainment; Monument Valley – ustwo Games/ustwo Studio	**Music**: **Far Cry 4 – Cliff Martinez, Tony Gronick and Jerome Angelot, Ubisoft/Ubisoft**; Alien: Isolation – The Creative Assembly/Sega; The Banner Saga – Stoic Studios/Versus Evil; Fantasia: Music Evolved – Disney Interactive Studios and Harmonix Music Systems/Disney Interactive Studios; Middle-earth: Shadow of Mordor – Monolith Productions/Warner Bros. Interactive Entertainment; The Sailor's Dream – Simogo/Simogo
**British Game**: **Monument Valley – ustwo Games/ustwo Studio**; 80 Days – Joseph Humfrey and Jon Ingold, Inkle/Inkle and Profile Books; Alien: Isolation – The Creative Assembly/Sega; Forza Horizon 2 – Playground Games/Microsoft Studios; Geometry Wars 3: Dimensions – Lucid Games/Sierra Entertainment; Lumino City – State of Play Games/State of Play Games	**Original Property**: **Valiant Hearts: The Great War – Yoan Fanise, Paul Tumelaire and Simon Choquet, Ubisoft/Ubisoft**; Kalimba – Press Play/Microsoft Studios; Monument Valley – ustwo Games/ustwo Studio; Sunset Overdrive – Insomniac Games/Microsoft Studios; Titanfall – Steve Fukuda, Richard Baker and Vince Zampella, Respawn Entertainment/Electronic Arts; The Vanishing of Ethan Carter – Adrian Chmielarz, Andrzej Poznanski and Michal Kosieradzki, The Astronauts/The Astronauts, Nordic Games
**Debut Game**: **Never Alone – Upper One Games/E-Line Media**; The Banner Saga – John Watson, Alex Thomas and Arnie Jorgensen, Stoic Studios/Versus Evil; CounterSpy – Dynamighty/Sony Computer Entertainment Europe; Hitman Go – Daniel Lutz, Square Enix Montréal/Square Enix; Shovel Knight – Yacht Club Games/Yacht Club Games; The Vanishing of Ethan Carter – Adrian Chmielarz, Andrzej Poznanski and Michal Kosieradzki, The Astronauts/The Astronauts, Nordic Games	**Performer**: **Ashley Johnson –** **The Last of Us: Left Behind as Ellie**; Adam Harrington – The Wolf Among Us as Bigby Wolf; Kevin Spacey – Call of Duty: Advanced Warfare as Jonathan Irons; Logan Cunningham – Transistor as Transistor; Melissa Hutchison – The Walking Dead: Season Two as Clementine; Troy Baker – Far Cry 4 as Pagan Min
**Family**: **Minecraft: Console Editions – Mojang/4J Studios/Microsoft Studios**; The Lego Movie Videogame – TT Games/Warner Bros. Interactive Entertainment; LittleBigPlanet 3 – Pete Smith, Paul Porter and Darius Sardeghian, Sumo Digital and XDev Studios Europe/Sony Computer Entertainment Europe; Mario Kart 8 – Nintendo/Nintendo; Skylanders: Trap Team – Toys for Bob and Vicarious Visions/Activision; Twelve a Dozen – Bossa Studios/Bossa Studios	**Persistent Game**: **League of Legends – Riot Games/Riot Games**; Destiny – Bungie/Activision; EVE Online: Phoebe – CCP Games/CCP Games; RuneScape – Jagex/Jagex; World of Warcraft: Warlords of Draenor – Blizzard Entertainment/Blizzard Entertainment; World of Tanks – Wargaming/Wargaming
**Game Design**: **Middle-earth: Shadow of Mordor – Monolith Productions/Warner Bros. Interactive Entertainment**; Alien: Isolation – The Creative Assembly/Sega; Destiny – Bungie/Activision; Far Cry 4 – Jean-Alexis Doyon, David Wilkinson and Scott Mitchell, Ubisoft/Ubisoft; Hearthstone: Heroes of Warcraft – Blizzard Entertainment/Blizzard Entertainment; Threes! – Asher Vollmer, Greg Wohlwend and Jimmy Hinson, Sirvo/Sirvo	**Sport**: **OlliOlli – John Ribbins, Simon Bennett and Tom Hegarty, Roll7/Roll7**; FIFA 15 – EA Sports/Electronic Arts; Football Manager 2015 – Sports Interactive/Sega; Forza Horizon 2 – Playground Games/Microsoft Studios; Madden NFL 15 – EA Sports/Electronic Arts; Trials Fusion – Kim Lahti, Antti Ilvessuo and Karri Kiviluoma, Ubisoft/Ubisoft
**Game Innovation**: **The Vanishing of Ethan Carter – Adrian Chmielarz, Andrzej Poznanski and Michal Kosieradzki, The Astronauts/The Astronauts, Nordic Games**; 80 Days – Joseph Humfrey and Jon Ingold, Inkle/Inkle and Profile Books; Alien: Isolation – The Creative Assembly/Sega; Lumino City – State of Play Games/State of Play Games; Middle-earth: Shadow of Mordor – Monolith Productions/Warner Bros. Interactive Entertainment; Titanfall – Steve Fukuda, Richard Baker and Vince Zampella, Respawn Entertainment/Electronic Arts	**Story**: **The Last of Us: Left Behind – Neil Druckmann, Naughty Dog/Sony Computer Entertainment Europe**; 80 Days – Joseph Humfrey, Jon Ingold and Meg Jayanth, Inkle/Inkle and Profile Books; Broken Age – Tim Schafer, Double Fine Productions/Double Fine Productions; Far Cry 4 – Mark Thompson, Lucien Soulban and Li Kuo, Ubisoft/Ubisoft; Never Alone – Upper One Games/E-Line Media; The Wolf Among Us – Telltale Games/Telltale Games

=== BAFTA Fellowship Award ===
- **David Braben**

=== BAFTA Ones to Watch Award ===
- **Chambara – Overly Kinetic**

=== Games with multiple nominations and wins ===
==== Nominations ====
Nominations	Game
6	Alien: Isolation
5	Far Cry 4
5	Monument Valley
4	80 Days
4	Destiny
4	Mario Kart 8
4	Middle-earth: Shadow of Mordor
3	The Banner Saga
3	Call of Duty: Advanced Warfare
3	Hearthstone: Heroes of Warcraft
3	Lumino City
3	Titanfall
3	The Vanishing of Ethan Carter
2	Fantasia: Music Evolved
2	Forza Horizon 2
2	Hitman Go
2	The Last of Us: Left Behind
2	Minecraft: Console Editions
2	Never Alone
2	The Sailor's Dream
2	The Walking Dead: Season Two
2	The Wolf Among Us
2	Threes!
2	Valiant Hearts: The Great War

==== Wins ====
Awards	Game
2	Monument Valley
2	The Last of Us: Left Behind

== Presenters and performers ==
The following individuals presented awards or performed musical numbers.

=== Presenters (in order of appearance) ===
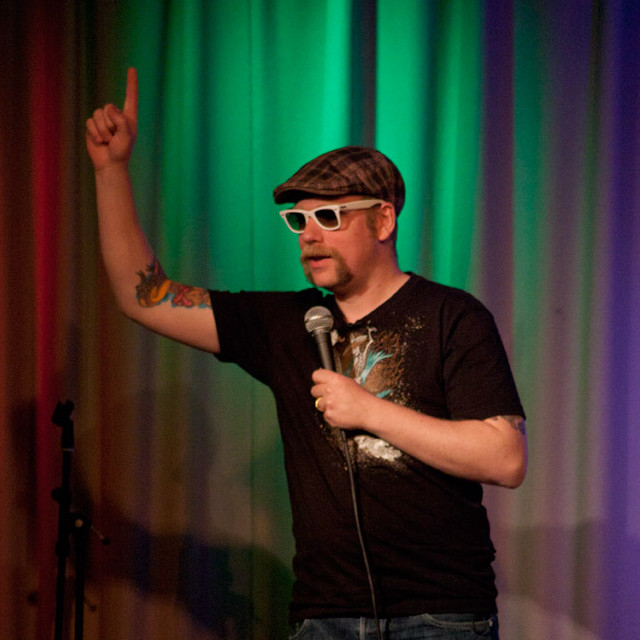
Rufus Hound hosted the 11th British Academy Video Games Awards.

Name(s)	Role
Rufus Hound	Announcer for the 11th British Academy Video Games Awards
Riva Taylor; David Arnold	Presenters of the award for Music
Georgia May Foote	Presenter of the award for Persistent Game
Martin Hollis	Presenter of the award for Story
Mike Bithell	Presenter of the award for Original Property
Linford Christie	Presenter of the award for Sport
Rob Beckett	Presenter of the award for Mobile & Handheld
Andrea Deck	Presenter of the award for Artistic Achievement
Dan Krull; Katy Hill	Presenters of the award for Audio Achievement
Alix Wilton Regan	Presenter of the award for British Game
Andy Akinwolere	Presenter of the award for Family
Chet Faliszek	Presenter of the award for Game Innovation
Dan Middleton	Presenter of the Ones to Watch Award to Chambara
Tim Schafer	Presenter of the award for Game Design
Alex Brooker	Presenter of the award for Multiplayer
Jo Twist	Presenter of the award for Debut Game
Maimie McCoy	Presenter of the award for Performer
Ian Livingston	Presenter of the Fellowship Award to David Braben
Dynamo	Presenter of the award for Best Game

=== Performers ===
Riva Taylor was the only performer at the 11th British Academy Video Games Awards, performing "Earth to Earth", a song written specifically for the event, to open the ceremony.

== Critical reviews ==
The ceremony received generally mixed to positive reception from media publications. Paul Tassi of American business magazine Forbes claimed that the British Academy Video Games Awards "might be [his] favorite show worldwide right now", praising the "sheer breadth and diversity of their award categories, and what they choose to honor". Tassi went on to praise winning games such as The Vanishing of Ethan Carter (Game Innovation) and League of Legends (Persistent Game). Oliver Cragg of newspaper The Independent welcomed the strong presence of "creative indie titles" at the ceremony. A review written by GameCentral for newspaper Metro, however, went as far as to state that "we're not sure we agree with any of the awards, except for Alien Isolation and David Braben", criticising "nonsense" such as a win for Minecraft, which was originally released years previously.

The majority of negative reactions to the ceremony related to Destiny winning the BAFTA for Best Game. Adam Rosser of BBC Radio 5 Live explained that "There was an audible ripple of surprise in the press room as Destiny took the best game Bafta", noting that the game had been "criticised in many quarters for ... suffering from a sparsely populated game world and repetitive gameplay". Some commentators supported the result, however: GamesRadar+, who named Destiny their game of the year, claimed that "it's good to see Bungie's masterpiece getting the attention it deserves". Entertainment Weekly's Jonathon Dornbush concluded that "despite its flaws, Destiny has demonstrated why it's tough to put the game down, and may be worth revisiting for those who initially wrote the game off", while Forbes writer Paul Tassi claimed that Dragon Age: Inquisition was arguably the "definitive" game of the year.

Arguably one of the most surprising results was in the Sports category, where independent title OlliOlli beat out many bigger releases such as FIFA 15. Matt Kamen of Wired described this as a "shocking win", and Mark Langshaw of Digital Spy similarly dubbed it "a shock".
