= Rollerdrome =

2022 video game

- Developer: Roll7
- Publisher: Private Division
- Director: Paul Rabbitte
- Producer: Drew Jones
- Designer: Andreas Yiannikaris
- Artist: Antoine Dekerle
- Composer: Electric Dragon
- Engine: Unity
- Platforms: Windows; PlayStation 4; PlayStation 5; Xbox Series X/S
- Release: Windows, PS4, PS5; 16 August 2022; Xbox Series X/S; 28 November 2023
- Genre: Action
- Mode: Single-player

Rollerdrome is an 2022 action video game that was developed by Roll7. The game is set in a dystopia in 2030 and follows Kara Hassan, who must compete in a deadly tournament known as the "Rollerdrome", in which she must fight enemies in an arena using firearms while roller skating. The game mixes roller skating with third-person shooting, requiring players to perform acrobatics to reload firearms. As players progress, they unlock more weapons and fight more-challenging opponents. While the game can only be played solo, at the end of each stage, players' performance is rated and can be shared online via a leaderboard.

Roll7 did not conceptualize the game internally; it originated as a side project of developer Paul Rabbitte, who created the concept during a game jam. Rabbitte described the original concept for the game as a mix between Tony Hawk's and Doom. After meeting in 2019, Roll7 and Rabbitte agreed to collaborate, and Rabbitte joined the studio as creative director. Development took two years and the developers spent the first year determining the core gameplay, which shifted from a linear structure to an arena shooter. The retro-futuristic setting was inspired by 1970s fiction like Rollerball and the visual style drew from ligne claire comic art, particularly from the works of Moebius and Hergé.

Publisher Private Division announced Rollerdrome in June 2022, and the game was released for Windows, PlayStation 4 and PlayStation 5 in August that year, and for Xbox Series X and Series S in November 2023. It received generally positive reviews upon release, with critics praising the gameplay and art style, though some criticized the game's narrative. The game attracted more than one million players by March 2024, and was selected as the best British Game at the 19th British Academy Games Awards. It was the final video game developed by Roll7 before it closed in 2024, and the publishing rights were transferred to 2K in 2025.

== Gameplay ==
Rollerdrome combines roller-skating gameplay with third-person shooting mechanics.

In 2030, in a dystopia controlled by mega-corporations, players control Kara Hassan as she competes in "Rollerdrome", a deadly sport created by the Matterhorn Corporation. Contestants, known as "House Players", must fight enemies using firearms while roller skating in an arena.

Rollerdrome is played from a third-person perspective. Players skate through stages while dodging incoming attacks and briefly slowing time to aim weaponry. They start the game with a pair of dual pistols and gradually unlock more-powerful weapons, such as grenade launchers, shotguns, and a long-range laser. They also face increasingly challenging enemies, each with distinct strengths and weaknesses. All weapons share an ammunition pool, and ammunition is refilled by performing roller-skating stunts and tricks. Health is restored by acquiring pick ups dropped by defeated enemies.

Players can advance to the next stage provided they survive all enemy encounters and complete gameplay challenges, such as eliminating enemies while performing certain tricks. Each stage has optional challenges that players can attempt. Damaging hostile opponents, chaining consecutive enemy takedowns and performing tricks contributes to a score multiplier, and players' performance can be shared online through an online leaderboard. The game also features assist options, such as infinite ammo and increased health, to make the game easier. After completing the game, players unlock the "Out for Blood" campaign, which increases the difficulty by making all enemy variants available from the start, and each deals more damage to the player character.

== Development ==
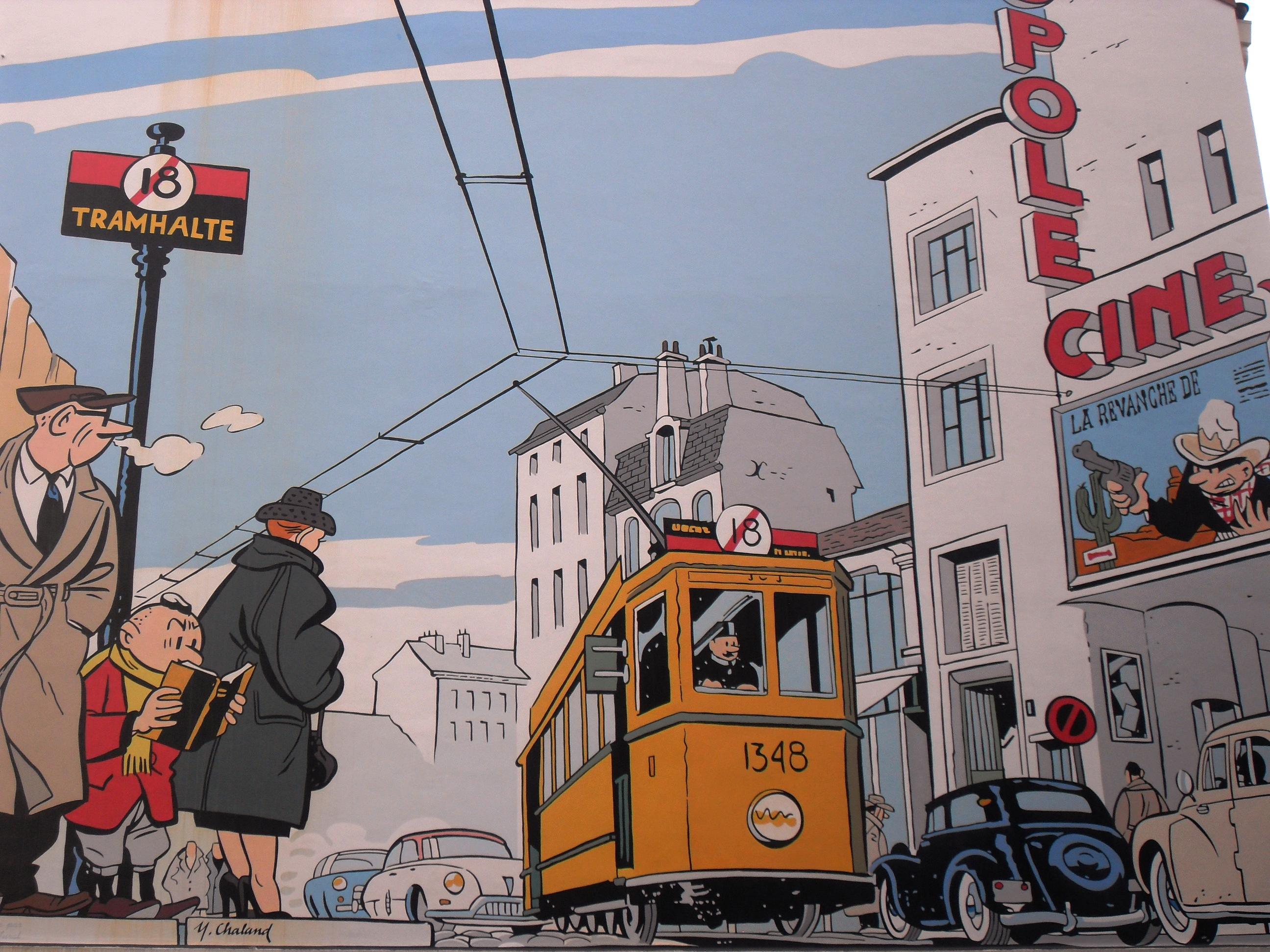
The art team drew inspiration from the Ligne Claire style while creating the game.

Rollerdrome started as a side project of game designer Paul Rabbitte, who devised it during a game jam hosted by Game Maker's Toolkit in 2017. Rabbitte wanted to develop a combat-focused game that emphasized constant movement, blending elements of Tony Hawk's Pro Skater and modern Doom games. Following the game jam's "Dual Purpose Design" theme, he created a system where players charge their weapons by performing roller-skating tricks, bridging combat and traversal through a single mechanic. Several publishers were intrigued by the project but hesitated to sign it because Rabbitte was the game's sole developer. In 2019, Roll7, the studio behind the OlliOlli skateboarding game series, met with Rabbitte and formed an in-house team to develop the game. Rabbitte then joined the studio as a creative director to finish it. Roll7 developed the game concurrently with OlliOlli World; while the games did not share a core development team, some technical art and quality assurance staff worked on both projects, and the two games share the same rendering engine.

Development of Rollerdrome took two years, and the team used the first year to determine the core gameplay. They decided Rollerdrome would be mainly a shooter, though the skating mechanics would complement the gunplay. To help maintain momentum in both skating and combat, the developers chose to prevent player characters from falling when they fail to perform a trick. The project was originally designed as a linear game similar to OlliOlli but several months into development, but Andreas Yiannikaris, the game's lead designer, decided to turn it into an arena shooter after being impressed by another prototype made by Rabbitte. Early iterations of arenas were large and open, which made performing stunts and creating set pieces difficult. As a result, the team had to redesign the game's map, extending the development cycle. According to Roll7, the maps were designed without sharp corners; instead, to maintain momentum, every arc and loop directs players back toward the center. The game's levels were designed to grow progressively more challenging without disrupting player movement. To maintain this flow, some weapons automatically lock onto enemies so players never have to slow down to aim. Rabbitte compared the combat to chess, noting that each weapon has unique advantages and drawbacks players must consider. Several gameplay mechanics, such as melee combat, were removed. According to Drew Jones, the game's lead producer, the gameplay of Rollerdrome was designed to be challenging to complement its narrative, as the player character is a "totally fresh competitor in an aggressive, brutal blood sport".

According to Jones, the team drew on "a wealth of fantastic inspiration from the 1970s", citing Rollerball and The Running Man as examples. Rollerdrome features a stylized, cel-shaded visual style because the team believed a simple art direction would preserve gameplay readability and prevent players from feeling overwhelmed. To fit the game's dystopian theme, locations were inspired by brutalist architecture. The art team also drew inspiration from the Ligne Claire style, particularly the works of Moebius and Hergé. According to lead artist Antoine Dekerle, the fast pace of the game prompted the art team to keep the visual design "clean, efficient, and straight to the point" using a palette of four or five colors per stage. High-contrast colors were frequently applied to ensure character and object outlines remained clearly visible to players. Electric Dragon served as the game's composers, who created an original soundtrack inspired by the works of Tangerine Dream and Giorgio Moroder, and music from the 1970s.

Roll7 and publisher Private Division announced Rollerdrome on 2 June 2022, during Sony's State of Play event. It was released for Windows, PlayStation 4 and PlayStation 5 on 16 August 2022. It was released for Xbox Series X and Series S on 28 November 2023, and was added to Xbox Game Pass on the same day. After Take Two Interactive's sale of Private Division and the dissolution of Roll7 in 2024, the publishing rights to Rollerdrome were transferred to 2K. As a result of the transition, the game was removed from Steam from February to May 2025.

== Reception ==
Reception

Aggregate scores
| Aggregator | Score |
|---|---|
| Metacritic | PC: 81/100; PS5: 79/100 |
| OpenCritic | 78% recommend |

Review scores
| Publication | Score |
|---|---|
| Eurogamer | Essential |
| Game Informer | 8.5/10 |
| GameSpot | 8/10 |
| GamesRadar+ | 3.5/5 |
| IGN | 9/10 |
| PC Gamer (US) | 94/100 |
| The Guardian | 3/5 |

According to review aggregator Metacritic, Rollerdrome received "generally favorable reviews" upon release. OpenCritic determined that 78% of critics recommended the game. The game won the "British Game" category at the 19th British Academy Games Awards, and was nominated for "Best Indie Game" at the 2022 Golden Joystick Awards. The game exceeded one million players by 19 March 2024.

Jonathon Dornbush of IGN said Rollerdrome provides a good balance between skating and shooting. He added that despite both occurring simultaneously, neither overwhelms the player because the developers made some "smart concessions" to the gameplay, noting how some weapons automatically lock on to enemies as players are moving. He also praised the ammunition refill system for being "creative", saying the overall gameplay falls into "a rhythm that was almost zenlike in its flow". Sam Greer, writing for PC Gamer, described Rollerdrome as his favorite action game since Devil Daggers, describing the game as "stylish" and "evocative". He enjoyed the game's progression, which encourages players to use new tactics as new enemies are introduced. Chris Tapsell from Eurogamer wrote that Roll7 combines two distinct genres with "total mastery", applauded the game's replay value, and said the game's four levels can be played "infinitely". In a more critical review, Jon Bailes from GamesRadar+ said later levels fail to challenge players to fight creatively, and that the game artificially increases the difficulty by simply increasing the number of enemies in a fight. Tom Regan from The Guardian was frustrated by the game's difficulty and disliked that it forces players to replay "thematically repetitive" levels to progress.

Greer praised the game's art style, comparing it to that of Sable. He also said the game's color palette is "highly readable" and complements gameplay that becomes progressively more "chaotic and explosive". Praising the arenas, he wrote that each stage raises "the spectacle from stadium battles to all out battlefields". Tapsell also praised the animation and art style, comparing it favorably to magazines and the works of Jean Giraud. Andrew Reiner, writing for Game Informer, wrote that the game has "comic-book visuals that leap off the screen", and said he enjoyed the dystopian and retrofuturistic setting. Greer liked the game's setting and appreciated that its quieter moments offer players greater insight into the world, but several critics said the overall narrative is insubstantial, with Bailes describing it as an "afterthought", and Phil Hornshaw from GameSpot describing it as "disappointingly inconsequential". He observed the game's over-reliance on environmental storytelling and said the story is just "tantalizing enough to leave you wishing there was more". Despite initially feeling the seriousness of the narrative does not mesh well with the action gameplay, Grayson Morley, writing for Polygon, recognized the story as "a commentary on the capacity of violent entertainment to dull our senses to the violence in our actual lives".
