= Overboard =

Overboard may refer to:

- Man overboard, a situation where a person goes over the side of a ship or boat into the water, possibly needing rescue

== Media ==
=== Films ===
- Overboard (1987 film), a 1987 movie starring Goldie Hawn and Kurt Russell
- Overboard (2018 film), a remake of the 1987 film, starring Anna Faris and Eugenio Derbez

=== Music ===
- Overboard (a cappella), an all-male a cappella group from New England
- "Overboard", a 2010 song by Justin Bieber featuring Jessica Jarrell from My World 2.0
- "Overboard", a 2022 song by Enrico Rava from 2 Blues for Cecil

=== Other uses in media ===
- Overboard (comic strip), a comic strip about a group of pirates
- Overboard! (1997 video game), a pirate-themed video game published by Psygnosis
- Overboard! (2021 video game), a visual novel video game developed and published by Inkle
