= Not a Hero =

2015 video game

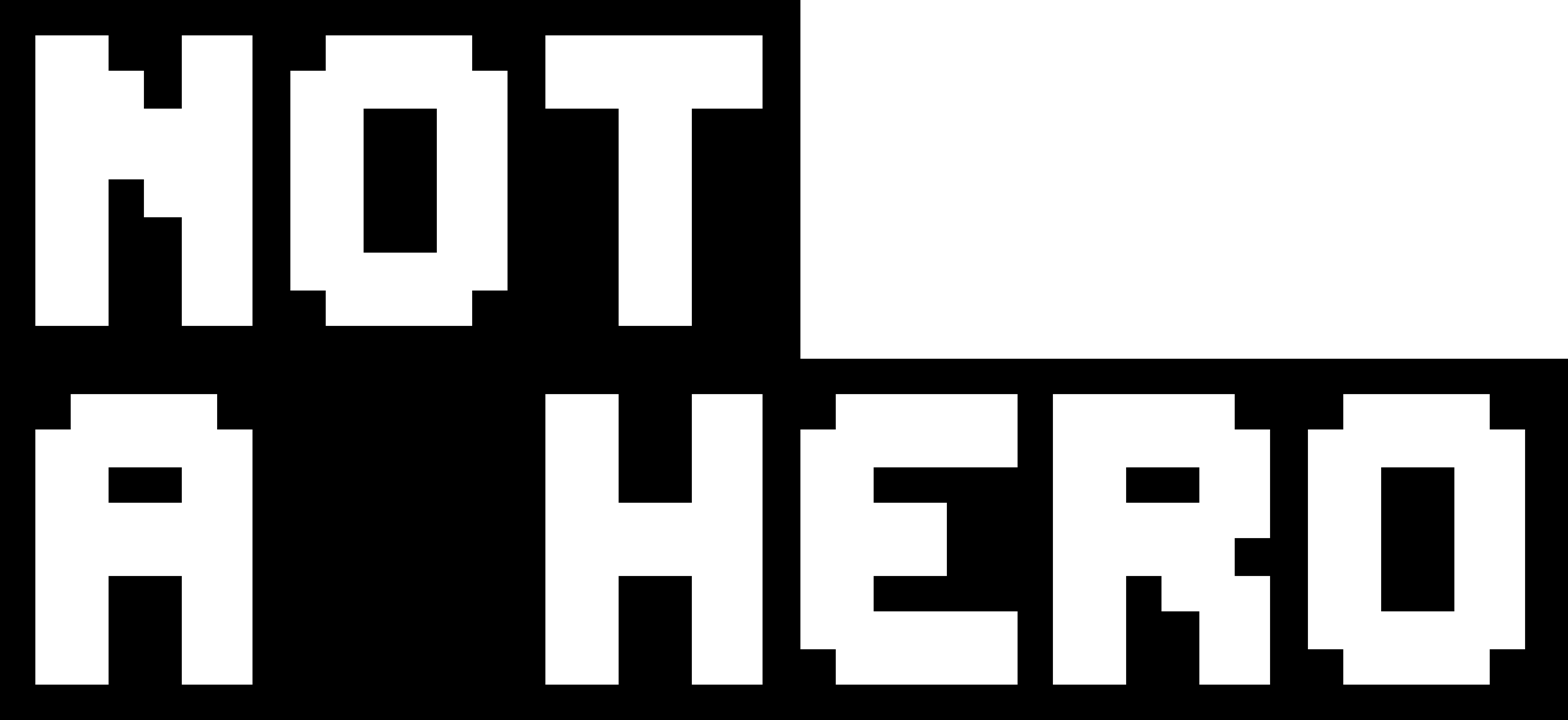
- Developer: Roll7
- Publishers: Devolver Digital; Team17 (Xbox One)
- Director: John Ribbins
- Producers: Simon Bennet; Tom Hegarty
- Designer: John Ribbins
- Artist: Jake Hollands
- Engine: Clickteam Fusion 2.5
- Platforms: Android, Microsoft Windows, OS X, Linux, PlayStation 4, Xbox One, Nintendo Switch
- Release: Microsoft Windows; 14 May 2015; OS X, Linux; 1 October 2015; Android; 17 December 2015; PlayStation 4; 2 February 2016; Xbox One; 24 May 2016; Nintendo Switch; 2 August 2018
- Genre: Shooter
- Mode: Single-player

Not a Hero is a 2015 shooter video game developed by Roll7 and published by Devolver Digital for Windows. It was released on OS X and Linux on 1 October 2015 and PlayStation 4 on 2 February 2016, with the PlayStation Vita version being cancelled. A Super Snazzy Edition, including a new extra campaign, was released on Xbox One by Team17 in May 2016, and on Nintendo Switch by Devolver Digital in August 2018.

== Plot ==
The anthropomorphic, purple rabbit BunnyLord has travelled back in time from 2048 to be elected as mayor to save the world as it is known from total destruction and alien invasion. During his candidateship, he needs to show the citizens why he should be elected and sets up freelance anti-heroes to clean up crime in the city under his name.

== Gameplay ==
Not a Hero is a 2D side-scrolling cover-based shooter presented in a pixel art style. Players can choose one of nine protagonists at the start of each level, each with their own twists on the mechanics of the game. The player is equipped with a primary weapon that can be upgraded temporarily or for the rest of the level with various upgrades found on the map. The player can pick up special weapons, such as deployable turrets or, more bizarrely, exploding cats. The player is unable to jump but can slide, and is able to use this to take cover against objects in the game world or tackle enemies, leaving them open to an execution. The player can only sustain a few hits, but health is regenerated quickly.

The objectives of each level vary, but they amount to accomplishing different tasks to promote BunnyLord's mayoral campaign, such as killing all criminals on the level, rescuing hostages or destroying drug production - each level also has three minor objectives to complete, with some randomness used to generate these. The game also boasts dynamic mid-level events, such as an attacking SWAT team or a helicopter gunship.

The nine protagonists, in order of unlocking, include: Steve, a cockney assassin who wields a fast-reloading pistol; Cletus, a supposedly-Scottish hillbilly who uses a shotgun to blow enemies backwards and shoot doors open; Samantha, a fast Welsh woman who can reload and fire while moving; Jesus, a hip-thrusting SMG-wielder, can run fast and execute enemies while moving; Mike, a rapidly-moving alcoholic from St. Helens, with a powerful sawed-off shotgun; Stanley, a slow-moving and slow-reloading paramilitary soldier with a high-capacity rifle; Clive, a bumbling spy who can shoot and run, as well as shoot two guns at each side of the screen; Ronald Justice, a deranged superhero wielding a hammer and pistol and Kimmy, who can use a katana in conjunction with her SMG. Each have various modifiers upon their normal gameplay mechanics such as movement speed.

== Development ==
Not a Hero was originally created under the title Ur Not a Hero by John Ribbins as a free indie game to accomplish his game list of ideas he made in 2012, which also included OlliOlli. Ur Not a Hero was released to on The Daily Click under the user name butterfingers on 10 January 2013. Although Not a Hero mostly relies on Ur Not a Hero, its mechanics are based on three games from John Ribbins' list: the cover-based shooter aspect, and with that the major aspect, comes from Ur Not a Hero, the indoor level design comes from his game Jeffrey Archer and BunnyLord's randomly generated sentences and sounds are from his game Hackathor. Roll7 later developed the game further, partnering up with ISO-Slant, a Clickteam Fusion add-on to make a 2D game appear 2¼D and to make one able to look around it using ISO-Slant glasses. This port was arranged by Roll7's artist Jake Hollands, making Not a Hero the first game to use ISO-Slant technology. The visual style developed for the game is a bright pixel art. In an interview, lead artist Hollands stated "I learned to create pixel art in the week before my interview at Roll7 and got much better at it whilst working on Not a Hero, but don't plan to return to it - I think that outside of a nostalgic choice there should be a good reason to use it".

The game was later picked up by Devolver Digital, who had previously published OlliOlli on Windows and mobile. A Twitter account based on BunnyLord was created to voice comical opinions on contemporary politics to market the game. On 21 April 2015, Not a Hero was announced to be hacked by the game's antagonists, only to reveal a playable demo. On 1 May 2015, Roll7 announced that the game's release would be delayed one week, due to Jake Hollands wanting the game to run at 60 frames per second, as all previous versions had run at 30 FPS. A later update, which was built using the Chowdren runtime for Clickteam Fusion 2.5 by MP2 Games, introduced builds for OS X and Linux on 30 September 2015. On 12 January 2016, it was announced that Not a Hero would be released for PlayStation 4 on 2 February 2016, with the PlayStation Vita version being officially cancelled later that day.

A port to the Xbox One, subtitled Super Snazzy Edition, was released by Team17 in May 2016, and on Nintendo Switch by Devolver Digital in August 2018; it includes a new campaign where BunnyLord is the playable character.

== Reception ==
Reception

Aggregate score
Aggregator	Score
Metacritic	(PC, XOne) 75/100 (PS4) 74/100 (NS) 70/100

Review scores
Publication	Score
Destructoid	(PC) 7/10
GameRevolution	(PC) 7/10
GameSpot	(PC) 7/10
GameTrailers	(PC) 7.8/10
Nintendo Life	(NS) 8/10
Nintendo World Report	(NS) 7/10
PlayStation Official Magazine – UK	(PS4) 7/10
Official Xbox Magazine (UK)	(XOne) 7/10
Polygon	(PC) 6.5/10
Push Square	(PS4) 7/10
Retro Gamer	(PC) 7/10
Shacknews	(PC) 8/10
The Telegraph	(PC) 4/5
USgamer	(PC) 3.5/5
Digital Spy	(PC) 4/5
The Escapist	(PC) 2.5/5

The PC and Xbox One versions received "generally favourable reviews", while the PlayStation 4 and Switch versions received "mixed or average reviews", according to the review aggregation website Metacritic.

Eurogamer gave the PC version an average review, saying, "Not a Hero isn't perfect, but it does enough to confirm that Roll7 is a developer to watch." EGMNow gave the PlayStation 4 version seven out of ten, saying, "The explosion-happy, pixel-art world of Not a Hero can be fun for short bursts. However, its inability to take anything seriously—paired with an intense objective system—leaves it somewhere in the middle."

Digital Spy gave the PC version a score of four stars out of five, calling it "An interesting and, importantly, fun game with enough going for it to keep you coming back, trying out new and different things and generally helping out in one of the most violently dodgy election campaigns ever seen." Metro gave the PC and PlayStation 4 versions seven out of ten, calling them both "A fun, funny, and wonderfully gory 2D shooter, but it's not quite as tightly designed as OlliOlli and certainly lacks the same longevity." However, The Escapist gave the same PC version two-and-a-half stars out of five, saying, "Not A Hero isn't a game for everyone. It's flawed [and] repetitive, but [it] works so well when it works."
