= OlliOlli2: Welcome to Olliwood =

2015 video game

- Developer: Roll7
- Publishers: Roll7; Devolver Digital (PC, Android, Switch); Team17 (Xbox One)
- Engine: PhyreEngine
- Platforms: Android; Linux; Microsoft Windows; OS X; PlayStation 4; PlayStation Vita; Xbox One; Nintendo Switch
- Release: PlayStation 4, PlayStation Vita; NA: 3 March 2015; PAL: 4 March 2015; Microsoft Windows, OS X, Linux; 11 August 2015; Android; 2 October 2015; Xbox One; 24 May 2016; Switch; 14 February 2019
- Genre: Sports
- Modes: Single-player, multiplayer

OlliOlli2: Welcome to Olliwood is a skateboarding video game developed and published by Roll7 for the PlayStation 4 and PlayStation Vita. The game was announced on 25 September 2014 as the sequel to the critically acclaimed OlliOlli, and was released on 3 March 2015 in North America and on 4 March 2015 in the PAL region. OlliOlli2 was released free to PlayStation Plus members. The game was ported to PC by BlitWorks and published by Devolver Digital, releasing it for Microsoft Windows, OS X, and Linux on 11 August 2015.

On 22 February 2016, OlliOlli2 was released for Android on the Google Play Store. On 9 April 2016, it was announced that Roll7 cooperated with Spanish publisher and distributor Badland Games to bring OlliOlli and OlliOlli2: Welcome to Olliwood to retail stores, delivered as OlliOlli: Epic Combo Edition for PlayStation 4. The game was later ported to Xbox One under the title OlliOlli2: XL Edition on 24 May 2016. A collection of both games released for Nintendo Switch on 14 February 2019, titled OlliOlli: Switch Stance. A sequel, OlliOlli World, was released in 2022.

== Reception ==
Reception

Aggregate score
Aggregator	Score
Metacritic	(PS4) 86/100 (Vita) 85/100 (XOne) 83/100 (PC) 82/100

Review scores
Publication	Score
Destructoid	(PS4) 9/10
Game Informer	(PS4) 8/10
GameRevolution	(XOne) 7/10
GameSpot	(PS4) 8/10
GameZone	9/10
IGN	(PS4) 9/10
PlayStation Official Magazine – UK	(PS4) 9/10
Official Xbox Magazine (UK)	(XOne) 8/10
PCGamesN	(PC) 9/10
Pocket Gamer	(Vita) 4.5/5
Polygon	(PS4) 9/10
Push Square	(PS4) 8/10
Retro Gamer	(Vita) 83%
USgamer	(PC) 4.5/5
Digital Spy	(PS4) 4/5
Metro	(Vita) 8/10

The game received "favourable" reviews on all platforms according to the review aggregation website Metacritic.

Over 1 million people have downloaded the game as of 27 March 2015.
