= Anchorhead =

1998 video game

- Developer: Michael S. Gentry
- Publisher: Self-published
- Designer: Michael S. Gentry
- Engine: Z-machine
- Platform: Z-machine version 8
- Release: 1998
- Genres: Interactive fiction, adventure, horror
- Mode: Single player

Anchorhead is a Lovecraftian horror interactive fiction game, originally written and published by Michael S. Gentry in 1998. The game is heavily inspired by the works and writing style of H.P. Lovecraft, particularly the Cthulhu Mythos.

Anchorhead takes place in a fictional New England town of the same name, where the unnamed protagonist and her husband, a professor and aspiring writer, have relocated to in order to take possession of his ancestral family home. Through historical investigation of the town and her husband's family, the protagonist uncovers a conspiracy to perform a ritual that will summon a Great Old One and put the planet in jeopardy. The protagonist must stop the ritual from occurring and save her husband. The game story takes place across three days, with the first two corresponding to whole days and the third day divided into a number of segments. There is no time limit in the first two days; each day ends when the player has completed a required task or tasks. Only during the third day does the game impose constraints on the number of turns a player can take to solve the necessary puzzles.

Anchorhead was hailed by critics and players as one of the best interactive fiction games available due to its complex and intricate backstory and well-written dialogue and descriptions. In the 1998 XYZZY Awards, Anchorhead received the award for Best Setting, and was also nominated for Best Game.

== Plot ==
The game is played through the perspective of an unnamed woman whose husband, Michael, suddenly inherits a large mansion in Anchorhead, Massachusetts, from family that he wasn't aware existed. The previous owner, Edward Verlac, killed his wife and daughter before taking his own life under mysterious circumstances. The game itself is split into 4 "days", each of which contains a set of puzzles that are required before the advancement of the next. On arriving in town, the car breaks under strange circumstances, stranding them in town without contact with the outside world. Croesus Verlac, the family's founder, has been possessing many of his male heirs in sequence, and begins to possess Michael. Croesus is attempting to summon a Great Old One named Ialdabaoloth, who takes the corporeal form of a multi-tentacled comet and is heading towards Earth at alarming rate. The protagonist sabotages Croesus' machine to summon Ialdabaoloth, saving the world. An epilogue shows that the protagonist is pregnant, raising concern that Croesus may attempt to possess her child if it is a son.

== Development ==
Anchorhead was written by Michael Gentry, who was living in Austin, Texas, in the Inform 6 programming language. Development took approximately a year, with several weeks dedicated to designing the game map and writing the story, "at least six solid hours of coding every day," and an additional three months dedicated to debugging. Gentry based the two main characters on himself and his wife. The game heavily draws elements from Lovecraftian literature, specifically The Dunwich Horror, The Music of Erich Zann, and The Festival, as well as direct references, such as the Miskatonic River and the city of Arkham.

In 2006, Gentry announced a rewrite of Anchorhead in Inform 7 preliminarily titled Anchorhead: the Director's Cut Special Edition, where the main goal is to "be just as evocative as the original, while allowing more room for the reader's imagination." Gentry also stated that some technological limitations encountered in Inform 6 would be addressed and NPC characters would be more interactive, thanks to the language's relatively easy declaration of relationships between the game objects. Gentry released the source code for the first five rooms in this edition on May 17, and a playable demo was released on December 15.

The rewrite was released in 2018 as Anchorhead: the Illustrated Edition. This version features revised and polished prose, redesigned puzzles, and new puzzles and backstory, along with 51 black and white illustrations by Carlos Cara Àlvarez. Unlike previous versions, the Illustrated Edition is a commercial release, available for purchase only.

== Reception ==
Anchorhead has received critical acclaim. Praise for the game was often directed towards its attention to detail in its descriptions, which built an imaginative and convincing game world; though some criticism was directed towards its puzzles in the later half of the game, which for some meant resorting to a walkthrough. Gregory W. Kulczycki stated that the game was "the most intelligent, polished and captivating piece of interactive fiction I have played to date." Kulczycki praised the "excellent" writing, which had a "refreshing attention to detail," feeling that playing Anchorhead was "like reading a good book;" and the puzzles, although not particularly difficult, helped "build a richer environment for the player." However, Kulczycki felt that the frequent game saves due to easy death in the last chapter began to "distract from the natural flow of the story." Emily Short called Anchorhead a "deeply beautiful piece," stating that the game had a "masterful build-up of setting and mood unparalleled by almost every other game I have ever played," particularly focusing on the scenery descriptions that made the environment "oppressively real." Short described the structure of the game play as "natural and immersive," feeling that none of the puzzles during the first half of the game were tacked on or redundant, though she "would have preferred a trifle less emphasis on timed puzzles in the later part of the game." Terrence Bosky also called Anchorhead "a well-written, wonderfully designed adventure game," stating that it "works brilliantly as a Lovecraft pastiche, never entering the realm of parody." Bosky however disliked the over-dependence on nearly all the items, expressing that "it would have been nice not having to lug everything around."

In the 1998 XYZZY Awards, the game won Best Setting and was a finalist for five other awards, including Best Game. It is (2023) listed as the #2 game in the Interactive Fiction Database Top 100.
