= Expelled! =

Visual novel video game

- Developer: Inkle
- Publisher: Inkle
- Engine: Unity
- Platforms: Windows, Nintendo Switch, iOS, Mac
- Release: March 12, 2025
- Genre: Visual novel
- Mode: Single-player

Expelled! is a 2025 visual novel developed and published by Inkle. It was released on March 12, 2025, for Nintendo Switch, iOS, and Windows.

== Gameplay ==
The gameplay of Expelled! has been compared to Inkle's previous game Overboard!. The player must avoid Verity being expelled from school.

== Plot ==
Verity Amersham, a student at a boarding school in 1922, is being framed for attempted murder.

== Reception ==
Reception

Aggregate scores
Aggregator	Score
Metacritic	(PC) 82/100 (NS) 85/100
OpenCritic	92% recommend

Review scores
Publication	Score
Eurogamer	4/5
PC Gamer (US)	80/100
RPGFan	92/100
The Guardian	4/5

Expelled! received "generally favorable" reviews, according to the review aggregation website Metacritic. Fellow review aggregator OpenCritic assessed that the game received "mighty" approval, being recommended by 92% of critics.
