= IFTF =

IFTF may refer to:

- Institute for the Future, a US–based not-for-profit think tank established in 1968 as a spin-off from the RAND Corporation to help organizations plan for the long-term future
- Interactive Fiction Technology Foundation, a nonprofit charitable organization founded in June 2016 working to maintain, improve, and preserve tools and services used in the creation and distribution of interactive fiction
