= Laser League =

2018 video game

- Developer: Roll7
- Publisher: 505 Games
- Directors: John Ribbins; Simon Bennett
- Producer: Tom Hegarty
- Programmer: Richard Ogden
- Artist: Paul Edwards
- Composers: Alan Myson; Ital Tek
- Platforms: PlayStation 4, Windows, Xbox One
- Release: May 10, 2018
- Genre: Sports
- Mode: Multiplayer

Laser League was a futuristic sports video game by Roll7. Two teams of one, two or three players compete to outlast their opponents by setting up moving lasers in an arena. The game was released in early access during 2017, and officially released for PlayStation 4, Windows, and Xbox One platforms in 2018.

== Release ==
An early access version of Laser League was released for Windows on February 8, 2018, following several closed and open beta iterations. The full version of Laser League was released for Windows, PlayStation 4, and Xbox One on May 10, 2018.

On August 24, 2018, Roll7 transferred Laser League development responsibilities to their publisher, 505 Games.

== Reception ==
=== Critical ===
Reception

Aggregate score
Aggregator	Score
Metacritic	PC: 78/100; PS4: 82/100; XONE: 81/100

Review scores
Publication	Score
Destructoid	8/10
Electronic Gaming Monthly	4/5
Game Informer	8.75/10
GameRevolution	8/10
Push Square	8/10

Laser League received positive reviews from critics. On Metacritic, the game holds scores of 78/100 for the PC version based on 5 reviews, 82/100 for the PlayStation 4 version based on 27 reviews, and 81/100 for the Xbox One version based on 11 reviews.

=== Accolades ===
Year	Award	Category	Result	Ref
2017	Game Critics Awards	Best Independent Game	Nominated	
2018	Golden Joystick Awards	Best Indie Game	Nominated	
2018	Golden Joystick Awards	Best Competitive Game	Nominated	
2019	D.I.C.E. Awards	Online Game of the Year	Nominated	
2019	National Academy of Video Game Trade Reviewers Awards	Game, Original Sports	Won	
2019	The Independent Game Developers' Association Awards	Best Action and Adventure Game	Nominated	
