= Down the rabbit hole =

English language idiom

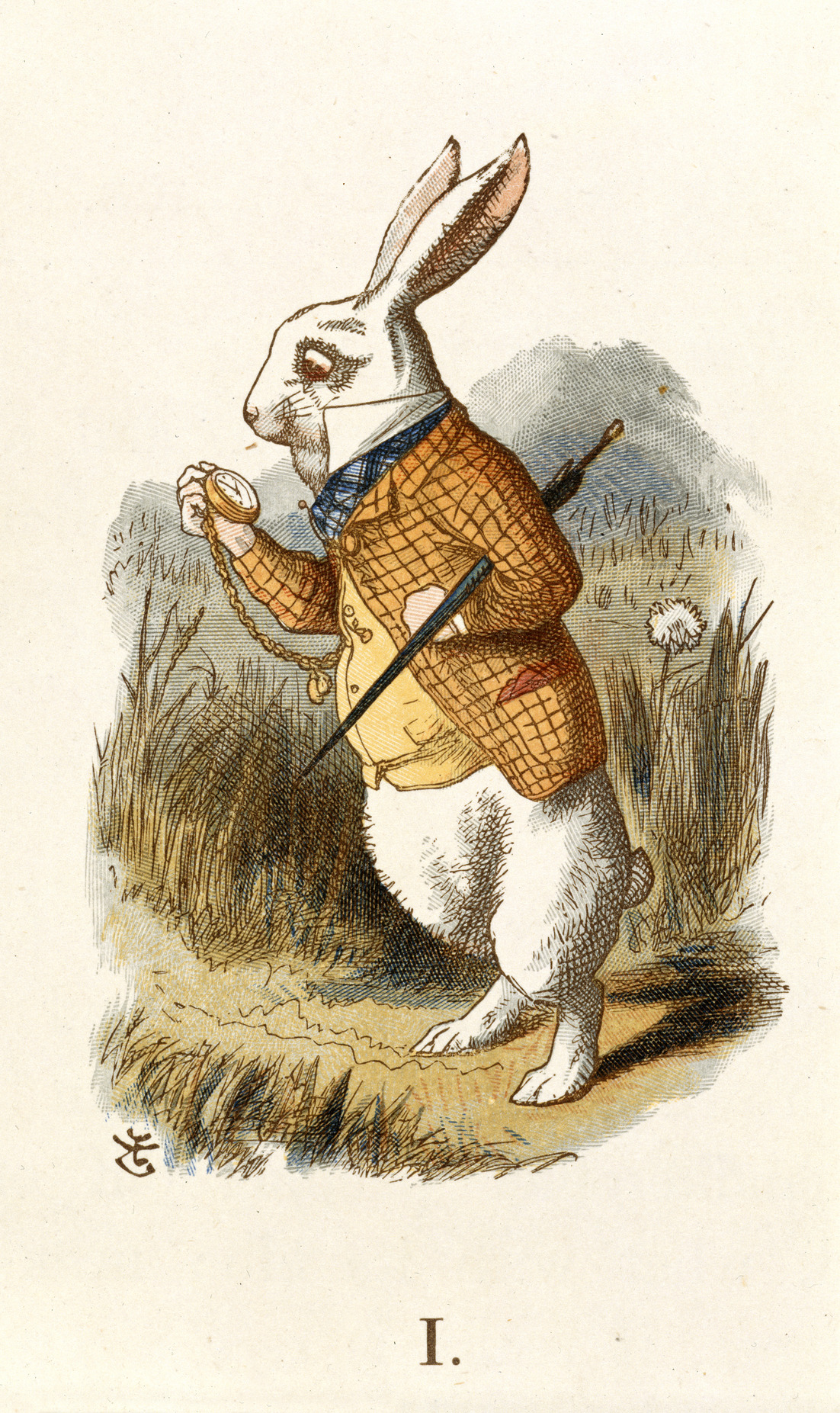
Rabbit from Alice's Adventures in Wonderland.

"Down the rabbit hole" is an English-language idiom or trope which refers to getting deep into something, or ending up somewhere strange. Lewis Carroll introduced the phrase as the title for chapter one of his 1865 novel Alice's Adventures in Wonderland, after which the term slowly entered the English vernacular. The term is usually used as a metaphor for distraction. In the 21st century, the term has come to describe a person who gets lost in research or loses track of time while using the internet.

== Etymology ==
In 1865, Lewis Carroll introduced the idiom in the novel Alice's Adventures in Wonderland. The chapter one title was, "Chapter One – Down the Rabbit Hole". Alice follows a white rabbit with pink eyes because she saw the rabbit checking a pocket watch. She chases the rabbit, and it bounds into a rabbit hole. Alice falls into the rabbit hole, and it is a long fall, which leads her to "Wonderland". In the novel, after the fall, the main character ends up in a world in which the rules of our shared reality do not apply.

In the 21st century, the term has come to mean a person ended up somewhere mentally rather than physically. Usually, a person uses the term when they describe having spent too much time on something or getting too involved. With the advent of the internet, the term has taken on the meaning of getting lost in a topic or researching one topic and ending up in another. It has become a metaphor for distraction. It has come to mean that someone has become interested in something, usually by accident; and often the subject does not deserve the amount of attention that a person gives. People who are interested in conspiracy theories are anecdotaly referred to as falling into "rabbit holes."

== English language uses ==
The idiom is often used to describe a person who is researching a topic on the internet or exploring new things on the web. Many websites are designed to keep users engaged. Websites which are most successful at keeping a user's attention are described as "rabbit holes". The term often has a positive connotation: falling down a rabbit hole often suggests that a person engaged in a guilty pleasure. It has also come to mean that a person ended up in a strange or difficult situation; "A complexly bizarre or difficult state or situation conceived of as a hole into which one falls or descends".

The idiom is also used to describe drug use, and the experience of an addict. The term can also be used to describe an individual's psychedelic experience.

=== Pop culture ===
In the movie The Matrix, Morpheus offers Neo the red pill and says, "You stay in Wonderland, and I show you how deep the rabbit hole goes." The Jefferson Airplane 1967 song "White Rabbit" refers to Alice and Wonderland.

== See also ==
- Analysis paralysis
- Comprehension of idioms
- Dead metaphor
- English-language idioms
- Red pill and blue pill
- Tunnel vision (metaphor)
- Wiki rabbit hole
