= Interactive Fiction Database =

Video games database

The Interactive Fiction Database (IFDB) is a database of metadata and reviews of interactive fiction, founded in 2007.

In November 2023, the database contained 12,969 game listings, 12,784 member reviews, 51,762 member ratings, and 17,040 registered members. Some games can be played in the web browser using links on the IFDB web site.

== History ==
The database was founded by Michael J. Roberts in 2007. Previously, the interactive fiction community had relied on sites like Baf’s Guide, which was a website cataloguing wokrs in the interactive fiction archive, which did not include commercially produced games or games that the author had not uploaded to the archive. IFDB expanded the number and diversity of works because users could contribute information about any interactive fiction, including out-of-print works, student projects and commercial games. Features like an RSS feed, rankings and user-curated lists also made it easier to discover works by new authors.

The IFDB is currently (2023) maintained by the IFDB committee of the Interactive Fiction Technology Foundation (IFTF).

== Top games ==
The top 10 games on the IFDB Top 100 list, using an IMDb style Bayes estimator to calculate weighted ratings based on all IFDB ratings, were (as of 2023):

1. Counterfeit Monkey, by Emily Short
2. Anchorhead, by Michael Gentry
3. Hadean Lands, by Andrew Plotkin
4. Superluminal Vagrant Twin, by C.E.J. Pacian
5. 80 Days, by inkle and Meg Jayanth
6. Open Sorcery, by Abigail Corfman
7. Worldsmith by Ade McT
8. The Wizard Sniffer, by Buster Hudson
9. Will Not Let Me Go, by Stephen Granade
10. Eat Me, by Chandler Groover

== See also ==
- Interactive Fiction Competition
- Spring Thing
- XYZZY Awards
