= TR-49 =

2026 video game

- Developer: Inkle
- Director: Jon Ingold
- Artist: Anastasia Wyatt
- Composer: Laurence Chapman
- Engine: Godot
- Platforms: iOS; macOS; Windows; Nintendo Switch
- Release: iOS, macOS, Windows; January 21, 2026; Nintendo Switch; April 7, 2026
- Mode: Single-player

TR-49 is a 2026 puzzle video game developed by Inkle for iOS, macOS, Windows, and Nintendo Switch. The player explores the database of a mysterious computer-like machine in an effort to find and delete a particular document to save the world. It is a detective game which has been described as using a Wikipedia rabbit hole as a gameplay mechanic. The game was met with generally favorable reception upon release. In particular, the game's complex themes and meta-narrative concept drew commentary by reviewers.

== Gameplay ==
The player almost exclusively interacts via the interface of the enigmatic computer-like machine, which accepts codes as input. It organises documents using a letter and number system in the XX-00 format. Usually the first two digits correspond with the author's name, while the latter two correspond with the year of publication. As an example, an excerpt from Jane Austen's Pride and Prejudice (1813) is present in the database under the code JA-13.

The player's goal is to navigate the machine, find one particular document, and delete it. In order to do this, the player must read documents, follow links and make inferences about publication dates and authors to locate new documents. Discerning the title of a document will unlock further information and reduce character scrambling. The texts themselves are tied into the game's meta-narrative. The machine also contains a small Choose Your Own Adventure-style game retained within the library, which becomes relevant in the late game. Clicking the microphone button will play out conversations between the player (Abbi) and Liam, who is acting as a guide and can offer hints and background story. The game is about four to five hours in length.

== Plot ==
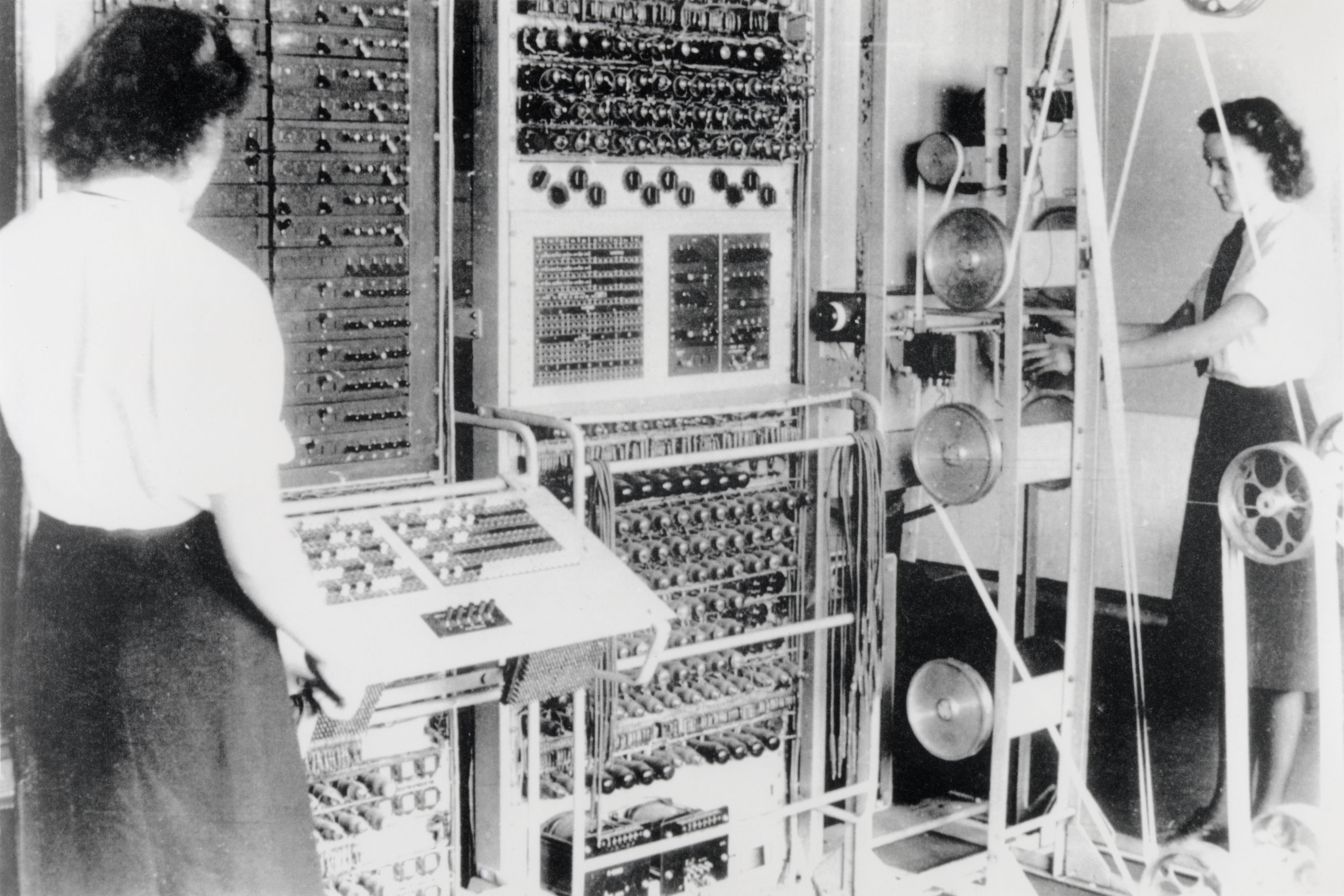
The machine was originally built to assist wartime code-breaking efforts at Bletchley Park

Abbi awakens immured in the basement of a church, alone but for a mysterious computer-like machine. She begins operating it at the radioed instruction of Liam, a researcher in the building above- with him imploring her to find a particular document. Over the course of working with the machine she learns that it has been "fed" many books and journals over the course of the preceding decades, and contains works which are now unavailable elsewhere. Liam withholds certain information from Abbi, insisting only that she find one particular book inside the machine's database.

Abbi learns of the concept of "revisions", alternate realities that are created by the human acts of reading, and believing texts. The machine's processing method- the way it analyses and stores the books within it- has warped reality to the extent that an extreme group called The Church of Rampaging Christ is now capable of resurrecting the dead and has turned the above world into an authoritarian dystopia. Abbi's goal is to remove the book Endpeace which grants them this power.

Her search leads Abbi to investigate the engineers who built the machine. Liam is killed by a church official above, but the assailant is unable to make it down into the walled-off basement. It is revealed that Abbi herself is one of the machine's programs (AB81) rather than a human. In addition to deleting Endpeace several alternate endings are available depending on choices made in the game's finale. The machine can be outright destroyed, or altered to remove its reality-bending capabilities. Abbi may also disable her own program, which leaves Endpeace intact.

== Reception ==
Reception

Aggregate scores
| Aggregator | Score |
|---|---|
| Metacritic | (PC) 83/100 (NS) 71/100 |
| OpenCritic | 92% recommend |

Review score
| Publication | Score |
|---|---|
| PC Gamer (US) | PC: 88/100 |

According to the review aggregation website Metacritic, the PC version of TR-49 received generally favorable reviews from critics, while the Nintendo Switch version received "mixed or average" reviews from critics. Fellow review aggregator OpenCritic assessed that the game received strong approval, being recommended by 92% of critics.

PC Gamer referred to the game as "a terrific mystery machine", praising the voice acting, narrative, and innovative game play. It was favourably compared to earlier detective works like Her Story by Kotaku, which described it as an "extraordinary demonstration of a mastery of language". Ars Technica was positive about the game's fairly short runtime, acknowledging that if the game had been longer the amount of information would have been untenable.

Criticism was generally focused on the limited soundtrack and repetitive button prompts to trigger voiceover from Liam. Kotaku journalist John Walker found Liam's interruptions annoying, as the microphone button would flash up typically when he was attempting to concentrate on a puzzle. PC Gamer pointed out that it was easy it was to brute-force solutions, as the game lacked the mechanic seen in Return of the Obra Dinn where three pieces of correct information were required to lock in answers- something that was becoming increasingly commonplace in the niche by 2026. Polygon suggested the brute-forcing may have been designed for, but could become tedious in the late game.

Some reviewers read the way the machine is fed existing works as a commentary on generative AI, which similarly requires a large corpus of training data. The Guardian instead compared the game's themes to those of the Chilean author Benjamín Labatut, particularly his historiographic metafiction book When We Cease to Understand the World. Polygon commented that the Orwellian approach to information within the machine was a harrowingly strong commentary on the online information space in the 2020s, affected by disinformation and intimidation of journalists. The Irish Independent came to the same conclusions, adding that "we can't be sure whether it's offering a lesson from the past or a prophecy for the future."
