= Counterfeit Monkey =

2012 video game

Counterfeit Monkey is a 2012 interactive fiction espionage game by Emily Short.

== Plot and gameplay ==
The game is set in Anglophone Atlantis, the world's greatest center for linguistic manipulation, and where the danger of the shifting reality has resulted in a police state run by language pedants trying to restrict language in order to keep an orderly reality. The state had become independent in 1822 by shooting a depluralizing cannon at attacking ships to make it one ship, and then shot that ship.

The player has been merged with another person. They are equipped with one full-alphabet "letter remover" and are tasked with getting off the island and thwarting the bureaucrats. Other tools are "homonym paddles" and an "umlaut puncher".

Short identified three categories of puzzles:

- Knowing which original object to change and the type of transformation (smaller or bigger) but not the name of the target object
- Knowing the target object but not the original object
- Knowing the target object's intended use (for example "a thing that makes noise", "a thing that is blue")

Transformations can be completed by several steps, removing one letter at a time but only as long as each step results in an actual word.

== Development and release ==
The game was inspired by Leather Goddesses of Phobos and expands on that game's T-puzzle.

It was developed in Inform 7 and is licensed under the CC BY-SA 4.0 license.

Short said of the game that it has merciful design (with an optional hard-mode) with multiple solutions and achievements for esoteric solutions.

It was first released in 2012 and the latest release was in February 2023.

== Reception and awards ==
Rock Paper Shotgun appreciated the joy of "gazing on your environment with the knowledge that it can be linguistically reshaped" and that puzzles had multiple solutions thus making success feeling personalized, ending the review with "With over eight hours of delicious wordplay, Counterfeit Monkey is a powerful start to interactive fiction in 2013.".

GameTrailers gave the game a score of 9.4, summarizing the game as "consistently surprising and adroit, engaged with its own core without drowning in witty self-referential winks [...] Successful, smart, and fun". They wrote about it that "Counterfeit Monkey [is] a delight, displacing the age-old 'guess the verb' mentality and challenging you to excise your inventory to perfect noun", and appreciated the ease of navigation and the conversation system. They wrote further that "Beyond the novelty of language, the game resonates with its setting and story, a mixture of Orwell and Steampunk, but not quite either, with a dash of modern allusions making this crazy world seam real." Of the design they wrote "while the game doesn't sport polygons or physics, it's a complex piece of code".

The Short Game, in their 192:nd episode, called it the best reviewed free game they had ever covered. They noted how the appreciation for the game had increased further over the years since its release and said that "anyone who pays attention to the scene has realized [it's] one of the games that will totally truly stand the test of time and is a true classic in the medium." and very influential. They praised the game's tutorial, the flexible and intuitive parser, and how the game was intended to be approachable for players new to interactive fiction while the central mechanics was described as unique, mind-blowing, and explored in great depth. Raygan Kelly referred to the saying "the dev-team thought of everything" and added that he had never played a game where that were more true. He appreciated how Short, even when an option was not allowed, had something funny or clever to say about it and with a wink of "Yes, I see you! I see what you're trying, and I like it." Kelly said the game succeeded in striking a balance with the massive city where the player never felt lost and that the huge inventory did not feel overwhelming. Instead these were aspects that made the player feel free. Other highlighted descriptions for the game are "word play puzzle game", "crossword puzzle on steroids", "scrabble tiles for real life", "first-person-parser-shooter", and a "portal for the English language".

The game won "Best game" in the 2012 XYZZY Awards, is (2023) listed #1 in the Interactive Fiction Database top 100, and was voted #1 in a member vote in 2023.
