= Learning pathway =

Learning pathway is the chosen route taken by a learner through a range of (commonly) e-learning activities, which allows them to build knowledge progressively. With learning pathways, the control of choice moves away from the tutor to the learner. "The sequence of intermediate steps from preconceptions to target model form what Scott (1991) and Niedderer and Goldberg (1995) have called a learning pathway. For any particular topic, such a pathway would provide both a theory of instruction and a guideline for teachers and curriculum developers".

Interactive courseware aids learners to access information and tools by which they can construct personalized transitions between the information to be accessed and their own cognitive structures. The process of navigation enables learners to experience the content of interactive courseware. Learning pathways also reveal the learning trails while learners traverse any interactive environment. Since learners have unique knowledge structures based upon their experiences and abilities, the ways that they choose to access, interact, and interrelate messages in interactive courseware also vary. Studies on pathways help us to explore and explain human behaviors during learning processes.

Another well-known definition of a learning path comes from the Learning Paths methodology for employee training developed by Jim Williams and Steve Rosenbaum. It uses a performance improvement approach and defines a learning path as the ideal sequence of learning activities that helps employees reach job proficiency in the shortest possible time. In this methodology, a learning path is created for the entire job role. By viewing learning as a complete process rather than a one-time event, it helps eliminate time, waste, and variability in training—leading to better results and lower costs. Learning paths have been shown to reduce time to proficiency by 30 to 50%.

== See also ==
- Learning management system
- Wiki rabbit hole
