= Wiki rabbit hole =

Navigating between topics while browsing wikis

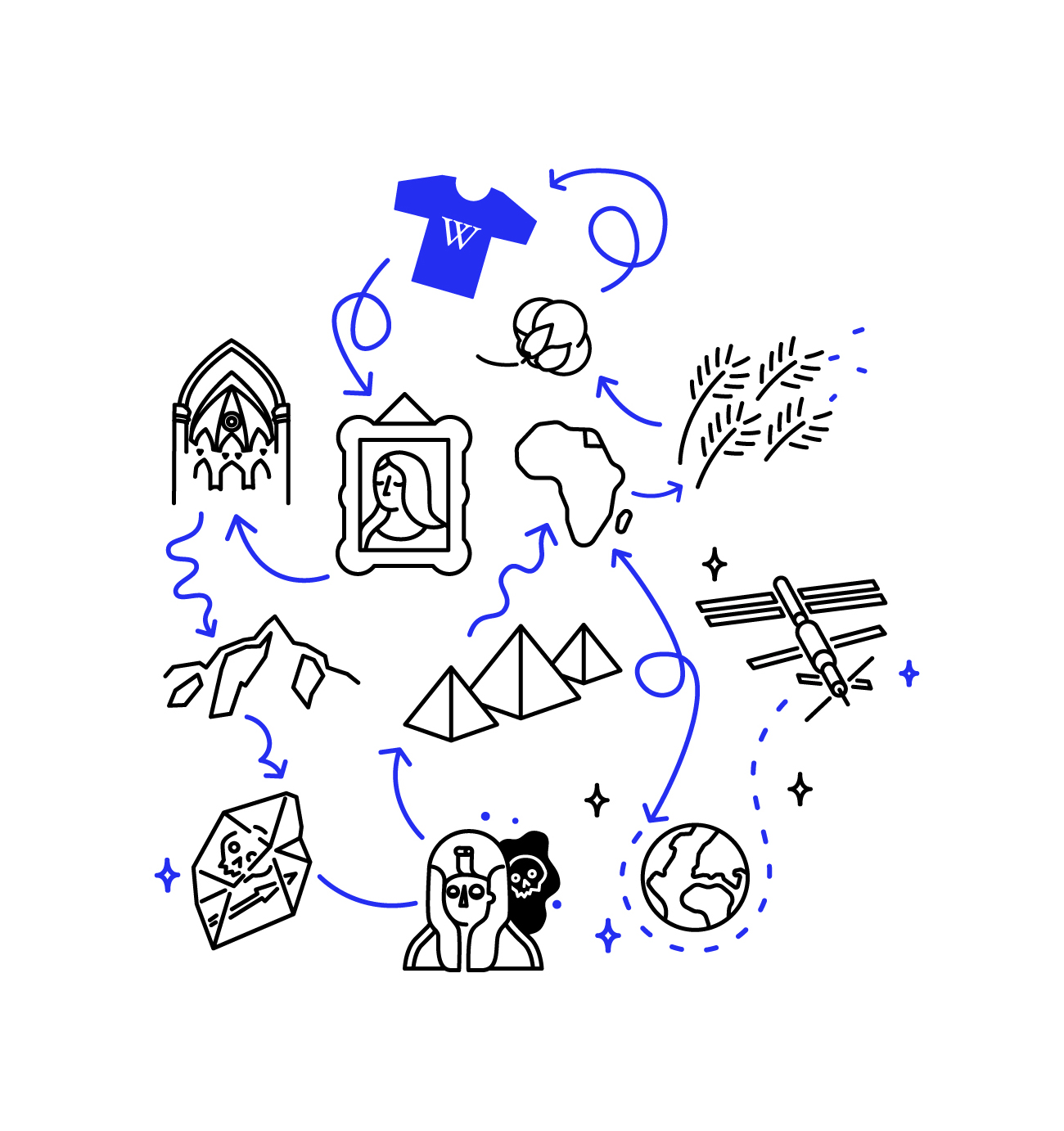
Illustration of a wiki rabbit hole for a T-shirt

The wiki rabbit hole (or wiki black hole), also called a wiki walk, is the learning pathway which a reader travels by navigating from topic to topic while browsing Wikipedia (through hyperlinks in articles) and other wikis. The metaphor of a rabbit hole comes from Lewis Carroll's 1865 novel Alice's Adventures in Wonderland, in which Alice begins an adventure by following the White Rabbit into his burrow. The black hole metaphor comes from the idea that the reader is powerfully sucked into a hole from which they cannot escape.

After learning or studying outside of Wikipedia, many people go to the online encyclopedia to learn more about the same topic, and then proceed to topics progressively further removed from where they started. Films based on historical people or events often spur viewers to explore Wikipedia rabbit holes.

Data visualizations showing the relationships between Wikipedia articles demonstrate pathways that readers can take to navigate from topic to topic. The Wikimedia Foundation publishes research on how readers enter rabbit holes. Rabbit hole browsing behavior happens in various languages of Wikipedias.

Wikipedia users have shared their rabbit hole experiences as part of Wikipedia celebrations as well as on social media. Some people go to Wikipedia for the fun of seeking a rabbit hole. Exploring the rabbit hole can be part of wikiracing. The 2026 detective game TR-49 has been described as using a Wikipedia rabbit hole as a gameplay mechanic.

== See also ==
- Wikipedia philosophy phenomenon
