= Galatea (video game) =

2000 video game

- Developer: Emily Short
- Publisher: Self published
- Designer: Emily Short
- Writer: Emily Short
- Engine: Z-machine
- Platform: Z-machine
- Release: 2000
- Genre: Interactive fiction
- Mode: Single-player

Galatea is an interactive fiction video game by Emily Short featuring a modern rendition of the Greek myth of Galatea, the sculpture of a woman that gained life. It took "Best of Show" in the 2000 IF Art Show and won a XYZZY Award for Best non-player character. The game displays an unusually rich approach to non-player character dialogue and diverts from the typical puzzle-solving in interactive fiction: gameplay consists entirely of interacting with a single character in a single room.

Galatea is licensed under the Creative Commons BY-NC-ND 3.0 US license.

== Gameplay ==
The opening screen of the game, awaiting the player's input

Galatea alters the typical interactive fiction game mechanics by concentrating instead on the player's interactions with a single non-player character (NPC), the eponymous Galatea. Much of the interest of the piece derives from the ambiguous nature of the player–NPC dialogue: the form of the conversation and, indeed, the nature of Galatea herself shift depending on the focus the player places on certain aspects of the character's personality. Numerous endings are possible. Gameplay centers around the developing dialogue between Galatea and the player when asking about topics in the previous conversation. Two commands, "think about" and "recap", are provided to keep track of what has already been said; the former is also used to advance the storyline, as the player character draws conclusions about the story as it has unfolded to that point. The game also encourages using sensory commands ("touch", "listen to", "look at"), adding immersion to the experience.

== Plot ==
Galatea is loosely based on the myth of Pygmalion, who carved the sculpture of a woman. In the myth, he falls in love with the statue, named Galatea or Elise in different versions, and the goddess Venus brings her to life.

The story begins at the opening of an exhibition of artificial intelligences. The player, alone, discovers Galatea displayed on a pedestal with a small information placard. She is illuminated by a spotlight and wears an emerald dress. Seeing the player about to turn away, Galatea says, "They told me you were coming." From this point, the story may proceed in a number of ways depending on the player's words and actions.

=== Multilinear interactive fiction ===
Short describes this as "multilinear interactive fiction": while interactive fiction in general allows the player to find their own way through the story, this leads in most cases to a single ending (or at least a single desired 'correct' ending). With Galatea, Short presents a story with around 70 different endings and hundreds of possible ways of reaching them.

The plot is thus designed to appear open-ended with the development of the story entirely dependent on what the player decides to talk or ask about or what actions they choose to perform. Thus the original author and the player share in the creation of a work of fiction.

== Development ==
In interviews, Emily Short has explained that Galatea arose out of her efforts to develop advanced dialog coding for interactive fiction engines. Although code for simple conversational programs like ELIZA have existed since the 1960s, and limited dialog options have existed in interactive fiction since the 1970s, Short's efforts to develop chatterbot-like dialog required her to produce a simple test case scenario to test NPC interaction. Thus the single-room, single-occupant Galatea was a natural result.

Development of the game progressed organically with Short engaging in test runs and drafting new dialog options for every conversational dead-end that arose. The game's multiple endings also arose in a similar fashion although Short had intended that there be multiple endings from the start. Although the nature of the game's development as well as its minimalist final form has led to questions regarding whether it is really a game and not just an experimental conversational program, Short has suggested that to her the definition of interactive fiction requires nothing more than a world model and a parser, and "anything you can cook up with those features counts as IF." Short has acknowledged the helpful influence of the close-knit IF community and the "atmosphere in which experimentation is valued" as leading to the success of her works like Galatea.

== Reception ==
Galatea was well received, achieving critical acclaim from interactive fiction reviewers and literary scholars. The game is considered to aspire to a new level of art in interactive fiction, and thereby to have revolutionized the genre, establishing its author, Emily Short, as one of the key figures in the modern interactive fiction scene. Fellow award-winning IF author, Adam Cadre has called Galatea "the best NPC ever"—a view that was echoed by Joystiq's John Bardinelli. Cadre also describes the game as an example of an alternative kind of puzzle where "interactivity comes in deciding where to go, what to see, what to say. Rather than having to open gates along a path, you discover that they're all open at first, but stepping through one causes others to close."

Galatea was described in 2007 by Indiegames.com as a "fascinating journey." In a 2009 article, Rock, Paper, Shotgun praised the depth and detail of the game, the complexities of the character design and its "masterful balance between intricacy and simplicity", and "Galatea's emotional turmoil" that is "encoded sweetly into the subtext of what's going on. By simply interacting in a logical manner, you learn more about this character than any cut-scene or info-dump could ever hope to convey." This was reiterated in a 2010 1UP.com article that listed Galatea as #2 in its "Top 5 Introductory Interactive Fiction Games" feature, describing it as intriguingly replayable, and as a "surprisingly rich game for its apparent minimalism". In 2011, PC Gamer highlighted Galatea as an example of the artistic and literary aspects of the interactive fiction genre.

The titular character, Galatea, has been compared to the 2007 Portal character GLaDOS due to similarities in the personalities of the characters.

== See also ==
- Cybertext
- Façade, a similar open-ended drama
- Aisle, a single-move interactive fiction
