= Heaven's Vault =

2019 adventure video game

- Developer: Inkle
- Publisher: Inkle
- Designers: Jon Ingold, Joseph Humfrey
- Programmer: Joseph Humfrey
- Artist: Laura Dilloway
- Writer: Jon Ingold
- Composer: Laurence Chapman
- Engine: Unity
- Platforms: Microsoft Windows, PlayStation 4, Nintendo Switch
- Release: PlayStation 4, Windows: WW: April 16, 2019; Nintendo Switch: WW: January 28, 2021
- Genre: Adventure game
- Mode: Single-player

Heaven's Vault is a 2019 archaeological science-fiction adventure game released by Inkle for Microsoft Windows and PlayStation 4 on April 16, 2019, and for Nintendo Switch on January 28, 2021.

== Gameplay ==
Gameplay screenshot.

In Heaven's Vault, the player takes the role of an archaeologist called Aliya Elasra who has a robotic companion called Six. The game follows the course of their adventure as they 'sail' between the moons of the Nebula searching for a missing roboticist called Janniqi Renba.

The player has to decipher and learn the hieroglyphic language of the Ancients, a lost civilization. This involves finding and collecting inscriptions from ancient artifacts, sites and ruins and translating and discussing texts with other characters.

The developers say that over a thousand words written in Ancient, the game's fictional language, can be found and say that its pictorial glyphs are inspired by Ancient Egyptian and Chinese writing systems.

The player can choose their own route through the story and around the Nebula as it employs a non-linear approach to narrative storytelling, allowing the player to make choices that impact the plot.

== Development ==
Following the release of 80 Days, Inkle had met with potential media partners for a collaboration for their next game. One of these was BBC who suggested several possible intellectual properties that Inkle could work on. This included Doctor Who, and over eight months they developed a prototype called The Daedelus Effect where the player could explore the TARDIS and play a mini game similar to Super Hexagon to simulate traveling in the TARDIS. This required updating their internal game engine support having 2D characters moving about a 3D environment. Though they did not hear back on this prototype from the BBC, Inkle decided to use the effort as a basis for a new game, resulting in Heaven's Vault.

== Reception ==
Reception

Aggregate score
Aggregator	Score
Metacritic	PC: 76/100; PS4: 71/100

Review scores
Publication	Score
Eurogamer	Recommended
Game Informer	8/10
GameSpot	6/10
PC Gamer (US)	88/100
PC World	4.5/5

On its release, Heaven's Vault was met with "generally favourable" reviews from critics for Microsoft Windows, with an aggregate score of 76/100, and "mixed or average reviews" with an aggregate score of 71/100 for PlayStation 4 on Metacritic.

== Music ==
Laurence Chapman composed the soundtrack for the game. Chapman recruited Brookspeare Music for recording the strings. He also added subtle synth pads as a reminder that Heaven's Vault is a science fiction game. Richard Brooker from Brookspeare Music also mixed the soundtrack.

== Novelisation ==
In 2021, Inkle published two tie-in novels for the game, Heaven's Vault - I. The Loop and Heaven's Vault - II. The Vault. A third tie-in novel, Heaven's Vault - III. The Flood was published in 2025 and the fourth, The Rising Light, completing the story, has been announced for 2026. Written by Jon Ingold, Heaven's Vault's writer, the books also follow the story of Aliya and Six, but feature a different plot to the game.

== Accolades ==
Year	Award	Category	Result	Ref
2019	The Independent Game Developers' Association Awards	Best Role-Playing Game	Nominated	
2019	2019 Golden Joystick Awards	PC Game of the Year	Nominated	
2020	Writers' Guild of Great Britain Awards	Best Writing in a Video Game	Nominated	
2020	New York Game Awards	Off Broadway Award for Best Indie Game	Nominated	
2020	NAVGTR Awards	Game, Special Class	Nominated	
2020	MCV/Develop Awards	Gameplay Innovation of the Year	Nominated	
2020	MCV/Develop Awards	Narrative Innovation of the Year	Nominated	
2020	Independent Games Festival Awards	Excellence in Narrative	Won	
2020	16th British Academy Games Awards	British Game	Nominated	
