= Jon Ingold =

British writer of interactive fiction

- Born: 1981 (age 44–45); England
- Occupation: Writer
- Writing career
- Notable works: Overboard!, Over the Alps, Heaven's Vault, 80 Days
- Website: www.inklestudios.com

Jon Ingold (born 1981) is a British author of interactive fiction and co-founder of inkle, where he co-directed and co-wrote 80 Days, and wrote Heaven's Vault and Overboard!. His interactive fiction has frequently been nominated for XYZZY Awards and has won on multiple occasions, including Best Game, Best Story and Best Setting awards for All Roads in 2001. Ingold's works are notable for their attention to the levels of knowledge that the player and player character have of the in-game situation, with the effect often depending on a player who understands more than the character or vice versa. Ingold has also written a number of plays, short stories and novels.

== Biography ==
Ingold began writing interactive fiction as a teenager, after searching online for information on Infocom and discovering the Inform programming language. He published his first major work, The Mulldoon Legacy (1999), just before starting a Mathematics degree at the University of Cambridge. It was only a month later that he could view the Usenet newsgroup devoted to interactive fiction; he later recalled, "it's still one of the most startling moments of my life when I loaded up rec.games.int-fiction and there were Mulldoon posts everywhere". Ingold continued to write IF during the university holidays and also reviewed films for a student newspaper. A trip to Venice provided the setting for his All Roads (2001).

After graduating from Cambridge, Ingold worked as a mathematics teacher in London. He later co-founded the company inkle, which has created several award-winning interactive stories, as well as the Inklewriter web tool for interactive fiction and the open-source ink scripting language. Ingold told Gamasutra that he had found potential players of interactive fiction were frustrated by the parser interface, which led him and his colleagues to develop Inklewriter as a non-parser-based alternative.

inkle has produced several games which have won numerous awards, including multiple IGF awards for narrative.

== Interactive fiction ==
The protagonist of Ingold's Fail-Safe (2000) is the only living person on a damaged starship, who makes a distress call and asks for instructions. Commands entered by the player are treated as delivered to him within the story, collapsing the distinction usually made in IF between the parser/narrator and the player character. Out-of-story actions such as saving progress are disabled and little text is displayed to the player apart from the survivor's dialogue, features which Jay Is Games reviewer John Bardinelli praised as contributing to the game's immersiveness.

In All Roads (2001), the narrative viewpoint shifts between a number of characters in Renaissance Italy, as if a separate entity is controlling each of them in turn. The player is challenged not just to solve character-specific puzzles, but to understand the logic behind the changes of character. The game was the first ever to win both the Interactive Fiction Competition (taking first place out of fifty-one entries in 2001) and the XYZZY Award for Best Game. It also received the XYZZY Awards for Best Story and Best Setting. The Electronic Literature Organization anthologised All Roads in the first volume of its Electronic Literature Collection. English professor Alf Seegert has used it as a case study in how interactive fiction can "generate presence", commending Ingold's integration of puzzles into the narrative.

Dead Cities (2007) was Ingold's contribution to the "H. P. Lovecraft Commonplace Book Project", a collection of interactive fiction based on Lovecraft's unpublished notes that was assembled for an exhibition at the Maison d'Ailleurs in Yverdon-les-Bains (Switzerland). It won Best in Show among the three English-language entries. Interactive fiction author Emily Short wrote a favourable review, calling the game "strange and challenging, evocative and opaque like Lovecraft's own stories". However, Eliza Gauger's review for Destructoid criticised the parser as inadequate and the writing and pacing as inferior to those of Ecdysis, another contribution to the Project.

In Make It Good (2009), the player controls a police detective investigating a murder in a house. Reviewers considered that this premise was inspired by Infocom's mysteries such as Deadline (1982), but that Ingold's detective was distinguished by his moral ambiguity and concealment of information from the player. Emily Short commented that the distancing of the player from the protagonist brought out the "alienation and cynicism of genre noir". John Bardinelli called Make It Good "a superb piece of interactive fiction on many levels", praising its active non-player characters and challenging puzzles. Graham Smith felt that it was "probably the best text adventure about being an alcoholic detective" and enjoyed the way the game's complexity make it feel more like a story and less like a puzzle.

Ingold was the writer for Textfyre's The Shadow in the Cathedral (2009), a steampunk adventure story that was one of the few commercially published interactive fictions of the 2000s. In a column for GameSetWatch, Emily Short described the game's prose as an important element in its worldbuilding.

=== All Roads ===
All Roads is a 2001 interactive fiction game by Jon Ingold that placed first at the 2001 Interactive Fiction Competition. It also won the XYZZY Awards for Best Game, Best Setting and Best Story and was nominated for Best Individual Puzzle and Best Writing. The game is story-oriented and features few puzzles, though in a sense is one big puzzle, since the player's goal is to decipher the meaning of the game after completing it.

== Bibliography ==
Games

- TR-49 (Writer, director; 2026)
- Expelled! (Writer, Game Director; 2025).
- The Forever Labyrinth (Writer, Game Director; 2024). Published by Google Arts & Culture.
- A Highland Song (Writer; 2023). Nominated for 3 IGF awards, for Audio, Narrative, and Grand Prize.
- Overboard! (Writer, Game Director; 2021). Winner of the Writer's Guild of Great Britain award for Best Writing in a Videogame. Nominated for 2 IGF awards, for Best Design and Best Narrative.
- Pendragon. (Writer, Game Director; 2020).
- Over the Alps. (Writer, with Katharine Neil; 2019). Winner of the Writer's Guild of Great Britain award for Best Writing in a Videogame.
- Heaven's Vault (Writer, Narrative Director; 2019). Nominated for the Writer's Guild of Great Britain award for Best Writing in a Videogame. Winner of IGF for Excellence in Narrative. Nominated for a BAFTA for Best British Game.
- 80 Days (Co-writer, with Meg Jayanth, Narrative Director; 2014). Winner of the Writer's Guild of Great Britain award for Best Writing in a Videogame. Winner of IGF for Excellence in Narrative. Nominated for 4 BAFTAs.
- Sorcery! (Writer, Narrative Director; 2012–2015).

Interactive fiction

- Break-In (1999; Z-code). Finalist at XYZZY Awards 1999 for Best Individual Puzzle.
- The Mulldoon Legacy (1999; Z-code). Winner at XYZZY Awards 1999 for Best Puzzles; also, a finalist for Best Individual Puzzle, Best NPCs, Best Setting, Best Story, and Best Game.
- Fail-Safe (2000; Z-code). Finalist at XYZZY Awards 2000 for Best Individual NPC.
- My Angel (2000; Z-code). IF Comp 2000: 6th place. Winner at XYZZY Awards 2000 for Best Story; also a finalist for Best Writing and Best Individual NPC.
- Large Machine (2001; Z-code).
- All Roads (2001; Z-code). IF Comp 2001: 1st place. Winner at XYZZY Awards 2001 for Best Setting, Best Story, and Best Game; also a finalist for Best Individual Puzzle and Best Writing.
- The Mulldoon Murders (2002; Z-code).
- Till Death Makes a Monk-Fish Out of Me! (with Mike Sousa; 2002; TADS 2). IF Comp 2002: 2nd place. Finalist at XYZZY Awards 2002 for Best Individual Puzzle, Best Story, Best Writing, and Best Game.
- Insight (2003; Z-code).
- Dead Cities (19-Jun-2007; Glulx). HP Lovecraft: The Commonplace Book Project 2007: Awarded Best in Show. XYZZY Awards 2007: Finalist for Best Story.
- Make It Good (13-Apr-2009; Z-code 8), nominated for 5 XYZZY Awards including Best Game.
- Klockwerk: The Shadow in the Cathedral (with Ian Finley; Glulx), published by Textfyre.inc. Nominated for 5 XYZZY Awards including Best Game.

Novels

Ingold converted the Heaven's Vault game into two novels in 2021, and then added two additional novels in 2025 and 2026 to complete the story.

- Book 1: The Loop
- Book 2: The Vault
- Book 3: The Flood
- Book 4: The Rising Light

Short stories

Jon Ingold has published short fiction in several issues of Interzone magazine:

- The History of Poly-V No. 227, Mar/10 Apr
- Over Water No. 228, May/10 Jun
- Sleepers No. 234, May/11 Jun
- The Fall of the City of Silver No. 236, Sep/11 Oct

Technical credits

- Co-designer of ink, and authoring system for branching narratives.
- Creator of Adventure Book, which is an authoring system for Choose Your Own Adventure games.
