= Emily Short =

Interactive fiction writer

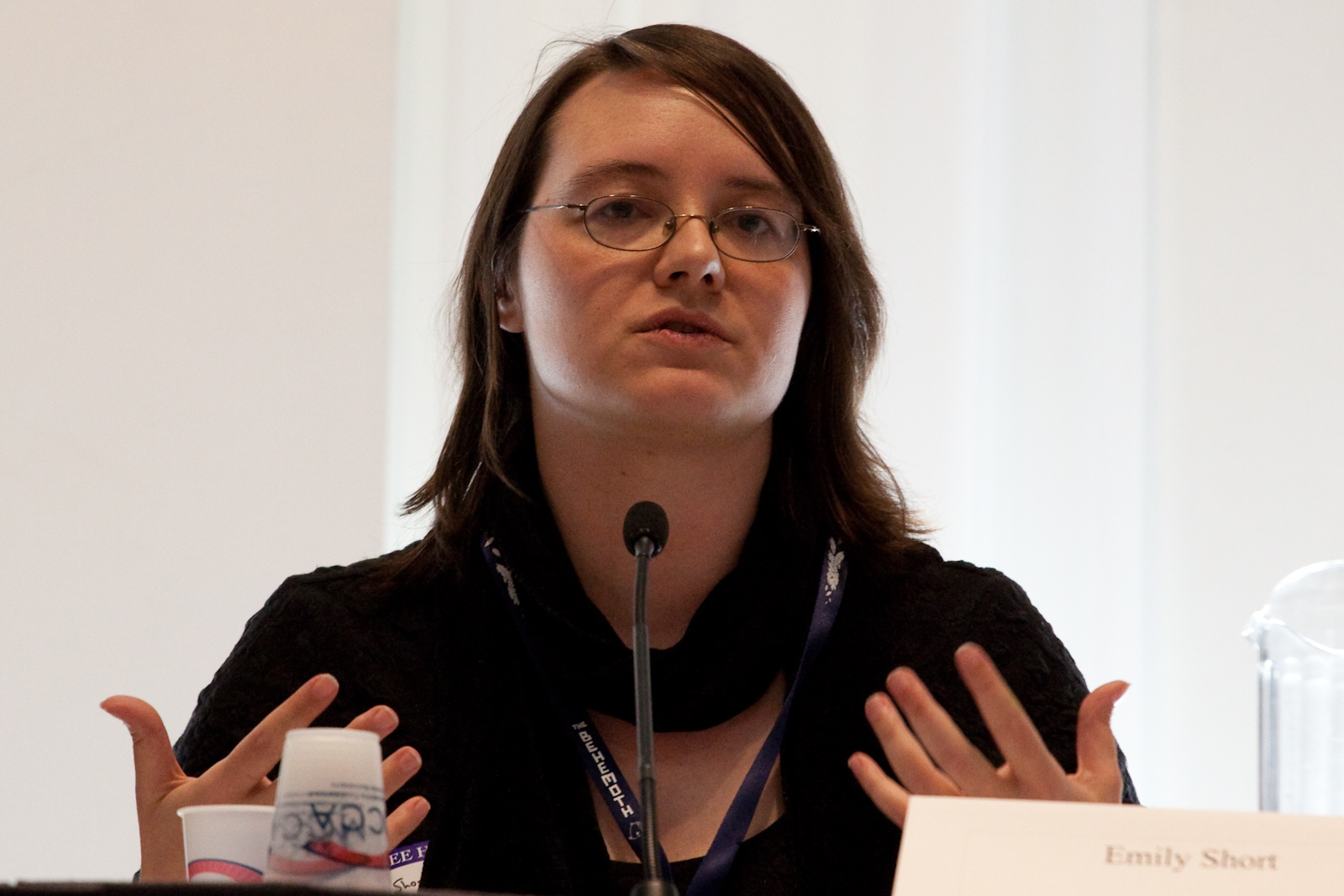
- Emily Short in 2010
- Known for: Galatea; Counterfeit Monkey
- Spouse: Graham Nelson
- Website: emshort.blog

Emily Short is an interactive fiction (IF) writer. From 2020 to 2023, she was creative director of Failbetter Games, the studio behind Fallen London and its spinoffs.

She is known for her debut game Galatea (2000) and her use of psychologically complex non-player characters (NPCs).

Short has been called "a visionary in the world of text-based games for years," and is the author of over forty works of IF. She wrote the chapters "Challenges of a Broad Geography" and "NPC Conversation Systems" for the 2011 The IF Theory Reader.

She wrote a regular column on IF for Rock Paper Shotgun.

== Career ==
In June 2011, Emily Short, with Richard Evans, co-founded Little TextPeople, which explored the emotional possibilities of interactive fiction. It was acquired in early 2012 by Linden Lab. In 2014, Short was let go by Linden Lab, ending the project she was working on, Versu. Around that time, she started the Oxford and London Interactive Fiction Group.

In September 2016, Short was hired by Spirit AI, a roughly 15 person company working on machine learning and natural language processing. She joined its board of directors in 2018, and was later named Chief Product Officer.

In January 2020, Short joined the 12 person Failbetter Games as creative director. She announced her departure from the studio in January 2024.

Short is one of the members of the advisory board for Interactive Fiction Technology Foundation (IFTF).

== Interactive fiction ==
=== Works ===
A number of Short's works have won acclaim at the XYZZY Awards, an annual popular-choice award for interactive fiction. Her work has been described by reviewers in terms that range from "mesmerizing" to "frustrating". Her 2003 work City of Secrets was originally commissioned by a San Francisco synth-pop band, but after they left the project, she completed it on her own.

Of over 11,000 games in the Interactive Fiction Database in July 2021, Short's game Counterfeit Monkey held the top spot in the IFDB Top 100. In addition to this, another five of Short's games, Savoir-Faire, City of Secrets, Bronze, Metamorphoses and Bee qualified into the top 100.

=== Tools ===
While many of Short's early games were written in Inform, she later experimented with a variety of formats. One such format was Versu, an engine for plot-heavy and story-rich interactive fiction that Short helped develop, and which was later scrapped by Linden Lab, the company owning the engine. Other formats include Varytale, for which she developed the game Bee, and a custom engine by Liza Daly (with help from the company inkle) for the game First Draft of the Revolution. Both formats use an interactive fiction engine based on hyperlinks.

Short wrote most of the 300+ programming examples in the documentation and created two full-length demo games for release with Graham Nelson's interactive fiction development system, Inform 7.

=== Selected IF works ===
Selected IF works
Association	Year	Category	Work	Result	Ref.
XYZZY Awards	2000	Best individual NPC	Galatea	Won	
XYZZY Awards	2000	Best Writing	Metamorphoses	2nd Place	
XYZZY Awards	2002	Best Game, Best Puzzles, Best Story, Best Individual PC	Savoir-Faire	Won	
XYZZY Awards	2003	Best NPCs	City of Secrets	Won	
XYZZY Awards	2006	Best Settings, Best NPCs	Floatpoint	Won	
XYZZY Awards	2012	Best Game, Best Setting, Best Puzzles, Best Individual PC, Best Implementation	Counterfeit Monkey	Won	
IF Artshow	2000	Best of Show	Galatea	Won	
Interactive Fiction Competition	2000	N/A	Metamorphoses	2nd Place	
Interactive Fiction Competition	2006	N/A	Floatpoint	Won	
Games Magazine	2004	Best RPG/Adventure	City of Secrets	2nd Place	

== See also ==
- Electronic literature
- Cybertext
