= Overboard! (2021 video game) =

Visual novel video game

- Developer: Inkle
- Publisher: Inkle
- Platforms: Windows, Nintendo Switch, iOS, Android, Mac
- Release: June 2, 2021
- Genre: Visual novel
- Mode: Single-player

Overboard! is a 2021 visual novel game developed and published by Inkle. It was released on June 2, 2021, for Nintendo Switch, iOS, and Windows.

== Gameplay ==
In Overboard!, the player must prevent other passengers from finding out that Veronica has murdered her husband. Throughout the eight-hour journey, the player can visit various areas throughout the ship and talk with the other passengers. The player can choose their own responses; this affects the game's ending as the story progresses.

== Plot ==
Veronica Villensey murders her husband on a boat during a trip to New York. The ending changes based on the player's choice.

== Development ==
Overboard! is Inkle's sixth game after 80 Days and Heaven's Vault.

== Reception ==
Reception

Aggregate scores
Aggregator	Score	
Aggregator	NS	PC
Metacritic	86/100	81/100
OpenCritic	96%	96%

Review scores
Publication	Score	
Publication	NS	PC
Adventure Gamers		5/5
Nintendo Life	9/10	
Nintendo World Report	9/10	
NME		4/5
RPGFan	88/100	
The Guardian	5/5	
Multiplayer.it	7.8/10	

On the aggregator website Metacritic, Overboard! has received a "generally favorable" rating for the Nintendo Switch and PC ports. On OpenCritic, the game has a 96% approval rating.

The game was well received. It won the "Delight and Fun" award at the Apple Design Awards 2022.
