= Interactive Fiction Technology Foundation =

The Interactive Fiction Technology Foundation (IFTF) is a nonprofit charitable organization founded on June 30, 2016, working to maintain, improve, and preserve the tools and services used in the creation and distribution of interactive fiction.

== Activities ==
Since 2016, IFTF has operated the Interactive Fiction Competition (IFComp), an annual competition for new works from independent creators which has been running since 1995.

Since 2017, IFTF has operated the Interactive Fiction Archive (IF Archive), an archive preserving the history of interactive fiction, which has been operating since 1992. The IF Archive contains websites and documents valuable to the IF community, including the "Inform 6" website and standards such as "the Treaty of Babel", the Z-machine, and its successor Glulx.

Since 2019, IFTF has supported the Interactive Fiction Community Forum (IntFiction) at intfiction.org, serving as a center for interactive fiction community discussion since 2006. 2019 also saw the establishment of NarraScope, an annual conference on narrative games.

Since 2021, IFTF has operated the Interactive Fiction Database (IFDB), a database of metadata and reviews of interactive fiction, which was founded by Michael J. Roberts in 2007.

Since 2022, IFTF has supported the Interactive Fiction Wiki (IFWiki), a community-maintained resource for the history and culture of interactive fiction, which was originally set up by David Cornelson in 2004.

IFTF supports and hosts the Twine software, initially created by Chris Klimas in 2009.

== Organization ==
The President of the Board of Directors is Justin Bortnick. Prior board members include Jason McIntosh, Judith Pintar and Andrew Plotkin.

Among the members of the advisory board are Jon Ingold, Max Gladstone, Nick Montfort, Brian Moriarty, Jim Munroe, Graham Nelson.
