= A Highland Song =

2023 video game

- Developer: Inkle
- Engine: Unity
- Platforms: Windows; macOS; Nintendo Switch
- Release: 5 December 2023
- Genres: Adventure, Platformer
- Mode: Single-player

A Highland Song is an adventure game by Inkle. It was released for Microsoft Windows and Nintendo Switch on 5 December 2023.

== Gameplay ==
The player controls Moira McKinnon, a teenager running away from her family home.

== Synopsis ==
Moira lives with her mother near the Scottish Highlands. She receives a letter from her uncle Hamish asking her to visit him at the coast.

== Development ==
The game was developed and published by British studio Inkle. A Highland Song was announced on 11 February 2022. It was released for Microsoft Windows and Nintendo Switch on 5 December 2023.

== Reception ==
TechRadar said its environment creates an immersive atmosphere and contains compelling musical segments, but it is short and occasionally frustrating.

The game was nominated for the Seumas McNally Grand Prize, excellence in audio, and excellence in narrative awards at the 2024 Independent Games Festival.
