= Lumino City =

2014 puzzle video game

- Developer: State of Play Games
- Publishers: State of Play Games (iOS), Noodlecake Studios (Android)
- Platforms: OS X, Windows, iOS, Android
- Release: OS X, Windows; 3 December 2014 iOS; 29 October 2015; Android; 12 April 2017
- Genres: Puzzle, adventure
- Mode: Single-player

Lumino City is a puzzle adventure video game developed and published by State of Play Games. The game was released for OS X and Windows in December 2014, for iOS in October 2015., and Android for 12 April 2017. It is a sequel to Lume.

== Gameplay ==
Lumino City is a puzzle adventure video game.

== Development and release ==
Lumino City was developed by State of Play Games. It is a sequel to Lume. Lumino City was released OS X and Windows on 3 December 2014, for iOS on 29 October 2015. and for Android on 12 April 2017 but the Android version was published by Noodlecake Studios

== Reception ==
Reception

Aggregate score
Aggregator	Score
Metacritic	iOS: 75/100; PC: 70/100

Review score
Publication	Score
TouchArcade	iOS: 4/5

At the 2015 Independent Games Festival, Lumino City was nominated for "Excellence in Visual Art". During the 18th Annual D.I.C.E. Awards, the Academy of Interactive Arts & Sciences nominated Lumino City for "Outstanding Achievement in Game Direction". At the 11th British Academy Games Awards, Lumino City won in the "Artistic Achievement" category; it was also nominated in the categories of "British Game" and "Game Innovation". The game received a nomination in the "Most Innovative" category at the 2016 Games for Change Awards.
