= Roll7 =

British video game developer

Rollingmedia Limited
- Trade name: Roll7
- Type: Subsidiary
- Industry: Video games
- Founded: 2008; 18 years ago
- Founders: Simon Bennett; Tom Hegarty; John Ribbins
- Defunct: 2024; 2 years ago
- Headquarters: London, England
- Key people: Simon Bennett (co-studio head); Tom Hegarty (creative director); John Ribbins (co-studio head)
- Products: OlliOlli series; Not a Hero; Laser League; Rollerdrome
- Number of employees: 55 (2023)
- Parent: Private Division (2021–2024)

Rollingmedia Limited (trade name: Roll7) was a British video game developer based in London. Founded in 2008 by Simon Bennett, Tom Hegarty, and John Ribbins, the company initially developed educational games on a contract basis before shifting to original intellectual properties in 2012. Roll7's OlliOlli, first released in 2014 for the PlayStation Vita, became highly successful and landed the company a publishing deal. Roll7 later developed OlliOlli2: Welcome to Olliwood (2015), Not a Hero (2015), Laser League (2018), and Rollerdrome (2022). Since May 2015, all employees were remote workers. Roll7 became a subsidiary of Private Division since November 2021, until the studio's closure in 2024.

== History ==
Roll7 was founded by friends Simon Bennett and Tom Hegarty, alongside creative director John Ribbins. They had been working together at their "youth multimedia training company" RollingSound when the British television network Channel 4 commissioned the production of a video game for its anti-knife crime season "Disarming Britain". They decided to produce games under a sister venture to RollingSound, establishing Roll7 in 2008. Their game for Channel 4, titled Dead Ends, was released on 25 June 2008. Roll7 continued creating educational games on a contract basis. One such project was Focus Pocus, a game for children with ADHD, which Neurocog Solutions released for NeuroSky's MindWave headset in February 2012. The studio expressed its desire to develop original intellectual properties but devised that it needed to save up funds first. An iOS game, Gets to the Exit, was released in July 2012. Although receiving favourable reviews, it was a commercial failure.

With the intent of creating games for consoles and personal computers, Roll7 began developing several prototype games in 2012. They met with James Mardsen, the manager of the indie game studio FutureLab, in July that year. Mardsen advised them to discuss these prototypes with Shahid Ahmad, a senior business development manager for Sony. At the time, Ribbins was working on an iOS prototype of a skateboarding game titled OlliOlliOlli, which he pitched to Ahmad upon Hegarty's request. After playing the game for roughly half an hour, Ahmad requested the game be brought to Sony's PlayStation Vita platform. While developing the game, Roll7 consisted of five people. The company released it as OlliOlli for the PlayStation Vita in January 2014. The game became a surprise success and won the BAFTA award for the best sports game in March 2015. This success led to a publishing deal with Devolver Digital and the eventual release of a sequel, OlliOlli2: Welcome to Olliwood, in March 2015. During this time, the team grew to seven members. Another Roll7 game, Not a Hero, was published by Devolver Digital in May that year. This project was largely developed by five freelancers who worked remotely. Bennett described this process as "thoroughly enjoyable" and, consequently, Roll7 shut down its Deptford offices in late May 2015 and shifted all company operations to remote work.

Also in 2015, Roll7 began working with the publisher 505 Games on a game that would be "much bigger" than Roll7's forgone games and supported by the UK Games Fund. This was later announced as Laser League and released in May 2018. In August of that year, Roll7 transferred all development duties for Laser League to 505 Games, citing that it had to take a break from game development.

The studio released RunMe, a free puzzle video game largely developed by Ribbins, in April 2020. In July of that year, Roll7 signed with Private Division for a "flow state" game. The two companies announced OlliOlli World in April 2021, expecting to release it later that year. In November, Private Division's parent company, Take-Two Interactive, acquired Roll7 and made it part of the publishing label. Being part of Private Division allowed the studio to stop seeking publishers for each project as it could stick to one partner with similar values.

In May 2024, Bloomberg reported that Take-Two planned to close Roll7, along with Intercept Games. However, Take-Two CEO Strauss Zelnick denied both studios' closures that same month. In the end, Roll7 was confirmed to be shut down after Take-Two sold Private Division to Haveli Investments in November of that year.

== Operations ==
Roll7 operated with via work from home with a few work days in its London offices per month and regular employee meetups elsewhere. The studio claimed to provide a "no-crunch culture" and encouraged employees not to work overtime. As of February 2023, Roll7 employed 55 people.

== Games developed ==
Year	Title	Platform(s)	Publisher(s)
2008	Dead Ends	Windows	Channel 4
2009	Invaders Reloaded	Windows	Roll7
2009	Thinky Thunky Party!	Windows	Roll7
2010	Zombie Pop!	macOS, Windows	Roll7
2010	Man.Up	macOS, Windows	Roll7
2011	Focus Pocus	Android, iOS, macOS, Windows	Neurocog Solutions
2012	Gets to the Exit	Android, iOS	Roll7
2013	OlliOlli	Android, Linux, macOS, Nintendo 3DS, Nintendo Switch, PlayStation 3, PlayStation 4, PlayStation Vita, Wii U, Windows, Xbox One	Roll7, Devolver Digital, Curve Digital
2015	OlliOlli2: Welcome to Olliwood	Android, Linux, macOS, Nintendo Switch. PlayStation 4, PlayStation Vita, Windows, Xbox One	Roll7, Devolver Digital, Team17
2015	Not a Hero	Android, Linux, macOS, Nintendo Switch. PlayStation 4, Windows, Xbox One	Devolver Digital, Team17
2018	Laser League	PlayStation 4, Windows, Xbox One	505 Games
2020	RunMe	Windows	Roll7
2022	OlliOlli World	Nintendo Switch, PlayStation 4, PlayStation 5, Windows, Xbox One, Xbox Series X/S	Private Division
2022	Rollerdrome	PlayStation 4, PlayStation 5, Windows, Xbox Series X/S	Private Division
