= Sorcery! (video game) =

- Developer: Inkle
- Publishers: No Gravity Games (NS, PS4, XBO)
- Platforms: iOS, Android, Microsoft Windows, OS X, Nintendo Switch, PlayStation 4, Xbox One
- Release: May 2, 2013 - September 22, 2016: Part 1; iOS May 2, 2013 Android March 12, 2014 Windows, OS X February 2, 2016 Part 2; iOS November 6, 2013 Android June 11, 2014 Windows, OS X February 2, 2016 Part 3; Android, iOS April 23, 2015 Windows, OS X April 5, 2016 Part 4; Android, iOS, Windows, OS X September 22, 2016 Complete Collection; Nintendo Switch, PS4, Xbox One June 23, 2022
- Genres: Interactive fiction, Adventure, Role-playing
- Mode: Single-player

Steve Jackson's Sorcery! is a series of interactive fiction adventure video games developed by Inkle, based on the gamebook series of the same name by Steve Jackson. Part 1: The Shamutanti Hills was first released on May 2, 2013, and the series concluded with Part 4: The Crown of Kings on September 22, 2016. The games were originally developed for iOS, but have since been ported to Android, Microsoft Windows, OS X, Nintendo Switch, PlayStation 4, and Xbox One.

== Gameplay ==
The games are text-based fantasy quests based on Steve Jackson's choose-your-own-adventure novels, and incorporate visual and interactive elements not present in the gamebooks. They also contain expanded content vis-à-vis the original gamebooks - the first entry, The Shamutanti Hills, featuring the fewest such expansions; the last The Crown of Kings, the most. Additions include a different combat mechanic that includes turn-by-turn energy, the inclusion of your spirit animal, and spelling out names of spells from a star sky. The third entry, The Seven Serpents, significantly expands the adventure by adding a whole new layer where the map is explored in two intertwined time lines.

== Release ==
The first entry Sorcery!: The Shamutanti Hills was released by Inkle in May 2013 on the iOS App Store and was a 'Game of the Year' finalist for TouchArcade, Mashable, and Gamezebo. The subsequent iOS releases were Sorcery! 2: Kharé - The Cityport of Traps in October 2013, Sorcery! 3: The Seven Serpents in April 2015, and Sorcery! 4: The Crown of Kings in September 2016.

The Shamutanti Hills was released on Android on March 12, 2014. Khare: The Cityport of Traps was released in 2014, The Seven Serpents was released in 2015, and The Crown of Kings released in 2016.

The first and second parts of Sorcery! were released as a single volume onto PC and Mac through Steam in February 2016. Sorcery! 3 and Sorcery! 4 were released in April and September 2016 respectively.

== Critical reception ==
=== Sorcery! ===
Reception

Aggregate score
Aggregator	Score
Metacritic	iOS: 85/100; PC: 69/100

Review score
Publication	Score
TouchArcade	iOS: 4.5/5

The game's innovative style of gameplay was lauded upon launch from outlets such as Hardcore Gamer, writing: "Sorcery! is one of the best games that this reviewer has played on the iPhone and iPad, offering a plethora of options and an excellent story." IGN gave similar praise, adding: "Sorcery! relies on the often-ignored power of strong writing, and it's better for doing so." It has a Metacritic score of 85 out of 100 based on 13 critic reviews.

=== Sorcery! 2 ===
Reception

Aggregate score
Aggregator	Score
Metacritic	iOS: 88/100; PC: 69/100

Review score
Publication	Score
TouchArcade	iOS: 4.5/5

The series's second entry had a noticeably similar aesthetic to the first, with Slide to Play mentioning how "Sorcery! 2 isn't doing much different", and MacLife making it a point to say "Sorcery 2 continues the adventure with very little iteration, but it's built on a strong foundation that remains charming." Other critics agreed noted that the game was still different enough to be worth it to returning fans, with 148Apps's review reading: "Building upon the success of its predecessor, Sorcery! 2 is a gripping and well told story of intrigue and adventure, amongst some great game features." It has a Metacritic score of 88 out of 100 based on 10 critic reviews.

=== Sorcery! 3 ===
Reception

Aggregate score
Aggregator	Score
Metacritic	iOS: 90/100

Review score
Publication	Score
TouchArcade	iOS: 5/5

After a longer break in between entries, the series's third game is perhaps best summarized with TouchArcade's review: "Sorcery! 3 is easily the biggest and most robust gamebook inkle has produced to date. It offers all of the strengths of the previous chapters and builds a ton of improvements on top of them ... it's hard to imagine how they're going to top this for the concluding chapter, but I guess we'll find out whenever it's ready." Gamezebo once more had praise for the Sorcery! series, remarking that "this is once again a seminal moment in interactive fiction." It has a Metacritic score of 90 out of 100 based on 10 critic reviews.

=== Sorcery! 4 ===
Reception

Aggregate score
Aggregator	Score
Metacritic	iOS: 89/100

Review score
Publication	Score
TouchArcade	iOS: 4.5/5

Upon release of what is thus far the series's concluding entry, critics still found Sorcery! 4 iterative and fresh with Rock, Paper, Shotgun calling it "utterly fantastic" and "a towering triumph". Richard Cobbett characterized the game in the same light, proclaiming Sorcery! 4 to be "easily the most crazily advanced, ambitious CYOA ever put to page or screen". It has a Metacritic score of 89 out of 100 based on 7 critic reviews.
