= OlliOlli World =

2022 video game

- Developer: Roll7
- Publisher: Private Division
- Director: John Ribbins
- Producer: Dan Croucher
- Designer: Craig Thomas
- Programmer: Andrew Brechin
- Artist: Paul Abbott
- Writer: Lizz Lunney
- Engine: Unity
- Platforms: Nintendo Switch; PlayStation 4; PlayStation 5; Windows; Xbox One; Xbox Series X/S
- Release: 8 February 2022
- Genre: Sports
- Mode: Single-player

OlliOlli World is a 2022 skateboarding video game developed by Roll7 and originally published by Private Division. The third game in the OlliOlli series, the game was released for Nintendo Switch, PlayStation 4, PlayStation 5, Windows, Xbox One, and Xbox Series X/S in February 2022. The game received positive reviews by critics.

== Gameplay ==
OlliOlli World is a 2D-platforming skateboarding game. The game takes place in Radlandia, where the player can interact with the game's characters, and take on side quests. To get high scores, the player is required to chain together tricks in order to get combos. The player can ride walls and grind on rails to increase their score. OlliOlli World introduces elements new to the franchise, such as quarter pipes and branching paths. The game has a hand-drawn art style, in contrast to the pixel art of previous entries.

== Development ==
The game was developed by British developer Roll7. One focus of development was making the game more accessible to newcomers, while still retaining high level play. The developers commented on the switch to 3D, saying, "OlliOlli and OlliOlli 2 are awesome games but there's things in the physics that we always wanted to do that we were never able to make work. There were ramps that we wanted to put in, huge launches and angles that were impossible when we were essentially doing pixel art".

The studio had previously considered making a 3D OlliOlli, but gained inspiration for it on a prototype that let the player skate forwards and backwards. Another focus was making failed landings less punishing. Roll7 replaced the previous penalty of failing the level with a loss of speed alongside breaking the player's combo. John Ribbins, the creative director of the game, says that the hand-drawn art style was inspired by Jet Set Radio and comic books.

OlliOlli World was announced during Nintendo's April Indie World presentation. It was then later released on February 8, 2022, with Private Division serving as its publisher. Two expansions for OlliOlli World were made available after its release: the VOID Riders expansion was released in June 2022, and the Finding the Flowzone expansion was released in November 2022.

After Take Two Interactive's sale of Private Division and Roll7's dissolution in 2024, the publishing rights to the game were transferred to 2K.

== Reception ==
Reception

Aggregate score
Aggregator	Score
Metacritic	NS: 87/100; PC: 87/100; PS5: 84/100; XSXS: 85/100

Review scores
Publication	Score
Destructoid	8.5/10
Game Informer	8/10
GameRevolution	9/10
GameSpot	9/10
GamesRadar+	4.5/5
IGN	9/10
Nintendo Life	9/10
Nintendo World Report	9.5/10
PC Gamer (US)	87/100
PCGamesN	9/10
Push Square	8/10
Shacknews	8/10
The Guardian	4/5
VideoGamer.com	7/10
Pure Xbox	9/10

OlliOlli World received "generally favorable" reviews, according to review aggregator Metacritic.

Polygon praised the title for allowing player creativity, "The thing I love about skateboarding is how it lets me be creative with my body... OlliOlli World's wacky environments explode this fantasy to the nth degree". The Verge liked the new surreal world in comparison on to the previous games, "the fantasy universe really adds life to the franchise, which was previously full of drab, utilitarian urban environments". Despite criticizing the writing as having a "how do you do fellow kids" feel, The Guardian enjoyed the visuals and game feel, saying "intricate stage backgrounds make this fantastical world come alive... this kingdom of eye-popping pinks, giant donuts and hipster animals blends together to create something wonderfully warm and relaxing". Game Informer liked the stage design, especially the multiple routes the player could take through it, "Each level's various explorable paths also means you can replay them to discover new experiences and combo opportunities. Often, I immediately revisited a level to see how other routes stacked up and what challenges I could find there".

=== Accolades ===
Year	Award	Category	Result	Ref
2022	Golden Joystick Awards	Best Audio	Nominated	
2022	The Game Awards 2022	Best Sports/Racing Game	Nominated	
2023	26th Annual D.I.C.E. Awards	Sports Game of the Year	Won	
2023	23rd Game Developers Choice Awards	Social Impact Award	Nominated	
2023	23rd Game Developers Choice Awards	Best Visual Art	Honorable mention	
2023	19th British Academy Games Awards	British Game	Nominated	
