= Inkle (company) =

English video game company

- Type: Privately held
- Industry: Video games
- Founded: November 2011
- Founder: Jon Ingold, Joseph Humfrey
- Headquarters: Cambridge, United Kingdom
- Website: inklestudios.com

Inkle is a video game development company based in Cambridge, United Kingdom, that specialises in interactive narrative, i.e. text-focused computer video games. They have created games such as 80 Days and Sorcery!, a recreation of Steve Jackson’s Sorcery! gamebook series.

Inkle has also created inklewriter, a tool for creating interactive fiction that was online from 2012 until 2018. inklewriter was subsequently revived as free and open-source software in 2019.

== History ==
Inkle was founded in November 2011 by Jon Ingold and Joseph Humfrey. Their first project was an interactive, choice-based version of Mary Shelley's novel Frankenstein, written by gamebook author Dave Morris and published by Profile Books. It received mixed reactions, being described by Laura Miller in Salon as "maybe the best interactive fiction yet" and earning a Kirkus Reviews “Best of 2012” star, while The Guardian described it as “digital butchery”, noting its “bewildering” format and how, despite being billed as “interactive”, users cannot change how the base story plays out.

In May 2013 they released the first game in a fantasy series, Sorcery!, based on gamebooks by famous UK games designer Steve Jackson. The adaptation was widely praised, with IGN calling it “a prime example of what can happen when traditional storytelling gets along with contemporary game design”. The first sequel followed in November 2013 and was substantially larger in scope, with the final two installments published in April 2015 and September 2016.

They have collaborated with Penguin Books on two apps. “Poems by Heart” is a memorisation game intended to help readers learn poetry and was chosen as one of Kirkus Reviews' Best Books of 2013. In the same year they worked with author Kelley Armstrong on The Cainsville Files, a visual-novel style interactive prequel to her Cainsville book series.

Gamasutra named them one of their top 10 developers of 2014, saying their game 80 Days “set an exciting bar for what mainstream interactive fiction could look like... without sacrificing sophistication and depth for accessibility”. The New York Times cited it an example of successful interactive storytelling while The Telegraph called it “one of the best branching narratives ever created” and “one of the best books of 2014”.

Pendragon, a “narrative roguelike” game based on Arthurian legend, was released in fall 2020.

Inkle subsequently announced the development of A Highland Song, a 'rhythm survival story' that retained narrative elements but departed further from their text-based roots.

=== Authoring tools ===
In 2012, Inkle created inklewriter, an online tool for creating interactive fiction. It was used in schools and was awarded a “Best Website for Teaching and Learning” award by the American Association of School Librarians in 2013. It was also used by some game developers, such as Stoic Studios, to aid in development of their game The Banner Saga. In August 2018, Inkle closed inklewriter, citing lack of time to resolve its issues, but it was later released as free-to-use open-source software.

Instead, Inkle promotes ink, a scripting language for interactive fiction, and a specialised editor, inky. The language is available under the open-source MIT license and can be integrated in game engines such as Unity using open-source plugins. Inky is a freely available, open-source editing software for use with Ink. Ink is suited for crafting dialogue trees and branching narratives.

== Games ==
Year	Title	Genre(s)	Platform(s)	Ref.
2012	Frankenstein	Interactive novel	iOS	
2013	Sorcery! Part 1: The Shamutanti Hills	Text/Graphic adventure	iOS, Android, Microsoft Windows, macOS	
2013	Sorcery! Part 2: Kharé: Cityport of Traps	Text/Graphic adventure	iOS, Android, Microsoft Windows, macOS	
2014	80 Days	Interactive fiction	iOS, Android, Microsoft Windows, macOS, Nintendo Switch	
2015	Sorcery! Part 3: The Seven Serpents	Text/Graphic adventure	iOS, Android, Microsoft Windows, macOS	
2016	Sorcery! Part 4: The Crown of Kings	Text/Graphic adventure	iOS, Android, Microsoft Windows, macOS	
2019	Heaven's Vault	Adventure	Microsoft Windows, PlayStation 4, Nintendo Switch	
2020	Pendragon	Strategy/Adventure	Microsoft Windows, macOS	
2021	Overboard!	Visual novel/Murder mystery	Microsoft Windows, iOS, macOS, Nintendo Switch	
2023	A Highland Song	Adventure/Rhythm	Microsoft Windows, macOS, Nintendo Switch	
2024	The Forever Labyrinth	Adventure	Web-based	
2025	Expelled!	Visual novel/Murder mystery	Microsoft Windows, iOS, macOS, Nintendo Switch	
2026	TR-49	Narrative deduction / Audio drama	Microsoft Windows, iOS, macOS	
