= OlliOlli =

2014 video game

- Developer: Roll7
- Publishers: Roll7; Devolver Digital (PC, Android); Curve Digital Deep Silver (3DS, Wii U, Xbox One, Switch)
- Platforms: Windows, OS X, Linux, PlayStation 3, PlayStation 4, PlayStation Vita, Xbox One, Wii U, Nintendo 3DS, Android, Nintendo Switch
- Release: Vita: NA: 21 January 2014; PAL: 22 January 2014; Windows, OS X, Linux: WW: 22 July 2014; PS3, PS4: NA: 26 August 2014; EU: 27 August 2014; Android: WW: 23 December 2014; 3DS, Wii U: NA: 5 March 2015; EU: 20 March 2015; Xbox One: WW: 6 March 2015; Switch: WW: 14 February 2019
- Genre: Sports
- Mode: Single-player

OlliOlli is a skateboarding video game developed and published by Roll7. It was released for PlayStation Vita on 21 January 2014 in North America, and on 22 January 2014 in Europe.

The game received a port for Microsoft Windows, OS X and Linux, developed by General Arcade and published by Devolver Digital, a port for PlayStation 3 and PlayStation 4, developed by BlitWorks and again published by Roll7, a port for Xbox One, Wii U, and Nintendo 3DS, developed by Carbon and published by Curve Digital, and a port for Android, developed by BlitWorks and published by Devolver Digital. A collection of both games released for Nintendo Switch on 14 February 2019, titled OlliOlli: Switch Stance.

A sequel, OlliOlli2: Welcome to Olliwood, was announced for PlayStation Vita and PlayStation 4 on 25 September 2014, and was released on 3 March 2015 in North America, and on 4 March 2015 in Europe. Another sequel, OlliOlli World, was released for Nintendo Switch, PlayStation 4, PlayStation 5, Xbox One, Xbox Series X/S and Microsoft Windows on 8 February 2022.

On 9 April 2016, it was announced that Roll7 cooperated with Spanish publisher and distributor Badland Games to bring OlliOlli and OlliOlli2: Welcome to Olliwood to retail stores, delivered as OlliOlli: Epic Combo Edition for PlayStation 4.

== Gameplay ==
OlliOlli features two-dimensional levels and a very basic control scheme, using only the "X" button, shoulder buttons, and left analog stick. The player combines tricks performed with attempting to land perfectly, and failing to do so results in the game awarding only a fraction of the points that would have been earned with a perfect landing. Each level has 5 achievements to perform, and once complete unlocks a harder level. As there are no checkpoints, falling at any point in a level forces the player to reattempt the level.

== Development ==
OlliOlli was developed by Roll7 and was originally intended to be released for iOS devices. In an interview with Gamasutra, Roll7 founder John Ribbins cites a conversation with James Marsden, creator of Velocity as the reason he took the game to Sony. After pitching the game to Shahid Ahmad, Senior Business Development Manager for Sony Computer Entertainment Europe (SCEE), Ribbins decided to drop iOS and develop OlliOlli exclusively for the PlayStation Vita. The use of physical controls over touch-screen controls allowed Roll7 to add additional mechanics to the gameplay, including the perfect landing system and the unlockable "RAD" mode. The game was delayed from its planned December 2013 release into 2014 due to an issue with the "Daily Grind" system.

== Reception ==
Reception

Aggregate score
Aggregator	Score
Metacritic	82/100 (Wii U); 79/100 (VITA); 78/100 (XONE); 78/100 (PC)

Review scores
Publication	Score
Destructoid	9.5/10
Edge	8/10
Electronic Gaming Monthly	8.5/10
Eurogamer	9/10
GameSpot	8/10
Hardcore Gamer	4/5
IGN	7.7/10
Polygon	8.5/10
The Escapist	3/5

OlliOlli received "generally favorable" reviews, according to review aggregator Metacritic. Writing for Destructoid, Ian Bonds gave the game a 9.5/10, and praised "the sweetspot of "simple to control" and "just difficult enough" to keep you playing without tearing your hair out". On Eurogamer, reviewer Simon Parkin rated the game a 9/10, and wrote "Elegant, understated and yet with the capacity for wild showboating, OlliOlli is a Twitch classic" The Escapist reviewer James Stephanie Sterling was more critical of the game, giving it a 3/5 and noting her frustration at times, writing "While playing this sidescrolling skateboard game, I was tempted to crack the Vita over my knee on multiple occasions".

OlliOlli won GameSpot's inaugural Game of the Month award in January 2014. It was also nominated for GameSpot's 2015 PlayStation Vita Game of the Year. At the 2014 National Academy of Video Game Trade Reviewers (NAVGTR) awards OlliOlli won Game, Original Sports and was nominated for Control Design, 2D or Limited 3D.
