= 80 Days (2014 video game) =

2014 video game

- App Store icon
- Developer: Inkle
- Publisher: Inkle
- Directors: Joseph Humfrey; Jon Ingold
- Artists: Jaume Illustration; Joseph Humfrey; Alan Dukes
- Writers: Meg Jayanth; Jon Ingold
- Composer: Laurence Chapman
- Platforms: iOS; Android; Windows; Mac; Nintendo Switch
- Release: iOS; July 31, 2014; Android; December 15, 2014; Windows, Mac; September 29, 2015; Switch; October 1, 2019
- Genres: Interactive fiction, Adventure
- Mode: Single-player

80 Days is an interactive fiction game developed and published by Inkle for iOS on July 31, 2014, and Android on December 15, 2014. It was released for Microsoft Windows and OS X on September 29, 2015. It employs branching narrative storytelling, allowing the player to make choices that impact the plot.

== Gameplay and plot ==
The player makes choices that impact the direction the story takes.

The plot is loosely based on Jules Verne's 1873 novel Around the World in Eighty Days. The year is 1872 and Monsieur Phileas Fogg has placed a wager at the Reform Club that he can circumnavigate the world in eighty days or less. The game follows the course of this adventure, as narrated by Phileas Fogg's manservant Passepartout, whose actions and decisions are controlled by the player.

After leaving London on an underwater train to Paris or a mail carriage to Cambridge, the player can choose their own route around the world, travelling from city to city. Each city and journey contains unique narrative content. The developers estimate that on one complete circumnavigation of the globe players will see approximately 2% of the game's 750,000 words of textual content.

In their role as valet, the player must manage their finances, their master's health, and time, as well as buying and selling items in different markets around the globe. The choices made by the player in story sections can also have a large impact on how the journey proceeds.

The game has several secrets, easter eggs and hidden endings, as well as several references to Verne's works, including Twenty Thousand Leagues Under the Seas and From the Earth to the Moon. The game is partly inspired by the steampunk genre, featuring such elements as sapient mechanical transport, hovercraft, submersibles and a city that walks on four gigantic legs.

== Reception ==
Reception

Aggregate score
Aggregator	Score
Metacritic	88/100 (iOS); 84/100 (PC, NS)

Review scores
Publication	Score
GameSpot	8/10 (NS)
Gamezebo	4/5 (iOS)
IGN	8/10 (iOS)
Nintendo Life	8/10 (NS)
Nintendo World Report	9/10 (NS)
PC Gamer (UK)	91% (PC)
Pocket Gamer	4.5/5 (iOS)
RPGFan	90% (iOS); 85% (PC)
The Telegraph	5/5 (iOS)
TouchArcade	4.5/5 (iOS)
National Post	8.5/10 (iOS)
Slant Magazine	4/5 (PC)

The game received "generally favorable reviews" on all platforms according to the review aggregation website Metacritic. Phill Cameron of The Daily Telegraph described the iOS version as "one of the finest examples of branching narrative yet created". AppleNApps said of the same iOS version, "The story is absolutely superb with the little twists, and nuances on the classic to keep you constantly engaged to press onwards." Pocket Gamer said, "It's rich with ideas, brilliantly written, and creates a world that you'll want to visit over and over again." Gamezebo said that the iOS version "has a solid amount of depth to it, [and] a great story...It's a challenge – but an intelligent one."

The iOS version was ranked #10 in Time's 2014 Game of the Year list. Despite being a game, The Telegraph newspaper also named it as "one of the best novels of 2014". The lead writer, Meg Jayanth, won a Writers' Guild of Great Britain award for her work on the project.

The game received four BAFTA nominations in 2015, for Best British Game, Best Story, Best Mobile Game and Game Innovation. It won the award for "Excellence in Narrative" at the 2015 IGF Awards, and was nominated for Excellence in Design and the Seumas McNally Grand Prize, both of which went to Outer Wilds. During the 18th Annual D.I.C.E. Awards, the Academy of Interactive Arts & Sciences nominated 80 Days for "Mobile Game of the Year".

The game was featured in the British Library's Digital Storytelling Exhibit, 2023.

As of 2025 it is listed as the #5 game in the Interactive Fiction Database Top 100.

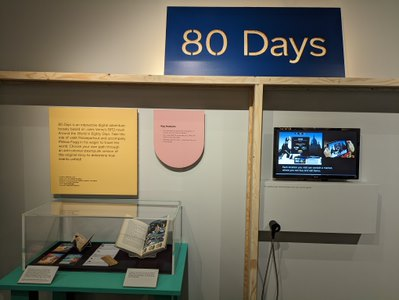
80 Days exhibited at the British Library's Digital Storytelling Exhibit in 2023
