= List of text-based computer games =

The following list of text-based games is not to be considered an authoritative, comprehensive listing of all such games; rather, it is intended to represent a wide range of game styles and genres presented using the text mode display and their evolution across a long period.

== On mainframe computers ==
Years listed are those in which early mainframe games and others are believed to have originally appeared. Often these games were continually modified and played as a succession of versions for years after their initial posting. (For purposes of this list, minicomputers are considered mainframes, in contrast to microcomputers, which are not.)

Title	Year Created	Creator	Notes
BBC	1961	John Burgeson	Baseball simulator
The Sumerian Game	1964	Mabel Addis, William McKay	The first edutainment game.
Unnamed American football game	1968 or before	Unknown	For the Dartmouth Time-Sharing System. One of "many games" in library of 500 programs.
The Sumer Game	1968	Doug Dyment	AKA Hamurabi
Highnoon	1970	Christopher Gaylo	
Baseball	1971	Don Daglow	
Oregon Trail	1971	Don Rawitsch	
Star Trek (strategy game)	1971	Mike Mayfield	
Star Trek (script game)	1972	Don Daglow	
Hunt the Wumpus	1973	Gregory Yob	
TREK73	1973	William K. Char, Perry Lee, and Dan Gee	
Cornell U. Hockey	1973	Charles Buttrey	
Wander	1974	Peter Langston	
dnd	1975	Gary Whisenhunt and Ray Wood	
Dungeon	1975	Don Daglow	
Colossal Cave Adventure	1976	Will Crowther	The original adventure game
Dukedom	1976	Vince Talbot	
Empire	1977	Walter Bright	
Mystery Mansion	1977	Bill Wolpert	
Zork	1977	Tim Anderson, Marc Blank, Bruce Daniels and Dave Lebling	
Acheton	1978	Jon Thackray, David Seal and Jonathan Partington	Adventure game originally hosted on Cambridge University's Phoenix mainframe
Decwar	1978	Hysick, Bob and Potter, Jeff	
MUD	1978	Roy Trubshaw and Richard Bartle	The first multi-user dungeon. See List of MUDs for later examples.
Battlestar	1979	David Riggle	
Brand X	1979	Peter Killworth and Jonathan Mestel	AKA Philosopher's Quest
HAUNT	1979	John Laird	
Martian Adventure	1979	Brad Templeton and Kieran Carroll	
New Adventure	1979	Mark Niemiec	
FisK	1980	John Sobotik and Richard Beigel	Text based adventure game
Hezarin	1980	Steve Tinney, Alex Shipp and Jon Thackray	
Kingdom of Hamil	1980	Jonathan Partington	Adventure game originally hosted on Cambridge University's Phoenix mainframe
Monsters of Murdac	1980	Jonathan Partington	Adventure game originally hosted on Cambridge University's Phoenix mainframe
Quondam	1980	Rod Underwood	Adventure game originally hosted on Cambridge University's Phoenix mainframe
Rogue	1980	Michael Toy, Glenn Wichman, and Ken Arnold	
LORD	1981	Olli J. Paavola	Based on The Lord of the Rings
Star Trader	1982	Bretten Au, Kevin Ryan, Kent Beck, Ron Lumsden, and James Walters	A space game originally hosted on University of Oregon's mainframe computer
Avon	1983	Jonathan Partington	Shakespearean adventure game originally hosted on Cambridge University's Phoenix mainframe
Castle	1983	Barry Wilks	
Dunnet	1983	Ron Schnell	
Fyleet	1986	Jonathan Partington	Adventure game originally hosted on Cambridge University's Phoenix mainframe
Crobe	1987	Jonathan Partington	Adventure game originally hosted on Cambridge University's Phoenix mainframe
Nidus	1987	Adam Atkinson	
Quest of the Sangraal	1987	Jonathan Partington	Adventure game originally hosted on Cambridge University's Phoenix mainframe
Spycatcher	1989	Jonathan Partington and Jon Thackray	Adventure game originally hosted on Cambridge University's Phoenix mainframe; released commercially by Topologika Software as Spy Snatcher

== On personal computers ==
=== Commercial text adventure games ===
These are commercial interactive fiction games played offline.

Title	Year Created	Creator	Notes
Adventureland	1978	Scott Adams of Adventure International	series
Zork I: The Great Underground Empire	1980	Tim Anderson, Marc Blank, Bruce Daniels and Dave Lebling	series
C.I.A Adventure	1980	Hugh Lampert of CLOAD	
Softporn Adventure	1981	On-Line Systems	
Madness and the Minotaur	1981	for Spectral Associates	
The Hobbit	1982	Philip Mitchell and Veronika Megler of Beam Software	
Valhalla	1983	Legend	
Time and Magik	1983	Level 9	
Forbidden Quest	1983	Pryority Software	
Valley of the Minotaur	1983	Nicolas van Dyk of Softalk	
The Wizard of Akyrz	1983	Brian Howarth of Mysterious Adventures and Cliff J. Ogden for Adventure International	
The Biz	1984	Chris Sievey of Virgin Games	Music band simulator for the ZX Spectrum
High Stakes	1984	Angelsoft	
The Hitchhikers Guide to the Galaxy	1984	Douglas Adams and Steve Meretzky of Infocom	
Mindwheel	1984	Robert Pinsky for Synapse Software	
Zyll	1984	Marshal W. Linder and Scott B. Edwards for IBM	
The Pawn	1985	Magnetic Scrolls	
A Mind Forever Voyaging	1985	Steve Meretzky of Infocom	
Brimstone	1985	James Paul for Synapse	
Essex	1985	Bill Darrah for Synapse	
Hampstead	1985	Peter Jones and Trevor Lever for Melbourne House	
Bored of the Rings	1985	Delta 4	
Mind Wheel	1985	Brøderbund Software	
Heavy on the Magick	1986	Gargoyle Games	
Breakers	1986	Rodney R. Smith for Synapse	
Terrormolinos	1986	Peter Jones and Trevor Lever for Melbourne House	
Amnesia	1987	Thomas M. Disch	The only entirely non-graphical text adventure ever published by Electronic Arts
Braminar	1987		
Dodgy Geezers	1987	Peter Jones and Trevor Lever for Melbourne House	
Enchanted Castle	1987	Michael R. Wilk	
Gnome Ranger	1987	Level 9	
Jacaranda Jim	1987	Graham Cluley	
Nord and Bert Couldn't Make Head or Tail of It	1987	Jeff O'Neill for Infocom	
Sherlock: The Riddle of the Crown Jewels	1987	Bob Bates for Infocom	
Shadows of Mordor	1987	Melbourne House	
Knight Orc	1987	Level 9	
The Guild of Thieves	1987	Magnetic Scrolls	
Fish!	1988	Magnetic Scrolls	
Ingrid's Back	1988	Level 9	
Corruption	1988	Magnetic Scrolls	
Dr. Dumont's Wild P.A.R.T.I.	1988	Michael and Muffy Berlyn	
Avalon	1989	Yehuda Simmons	A MUD, notable for its pioneering introduction of various innovations such as plotted quests, real estate, banking and distinct skills
The Hound of Shadow	1989	for Eldritch Games	
Humbug	1990	Graham Cluley	
Islands of Danger	1990	Carr Software	
Danger! Adventurer at Work!	1991	Simon Avery	
Spy Snatcher	1992	Jonathan Partington and Jonathan Thackray for Topologika	

=== Miscellaneous games ===
Title	Year Created	Creator	Notes
Wizard's Castle	1978	Joseph R. Power	
Aliens	1982	Yahoo Software	Space Invaders clone for Kaypro.
CatChum	1982	Yahoo Software	Pac-Man clone for Kaypro.
Ladder	1982	Yahoo Software	Donkey Kong clone for Kaypro.
Text Train	1982	Bert Kersey, Beagle Bros Software	
Snipes	1983	SuperSet	
Sleuth	1983	Eric N. Miller	
Beast	1984	Dan Baker, Alan Brown, Mark Hamilton and Derrick Shadel	
Manor	1986	Leon Baradat	Based on Hammurabi, Kingdom, and Dukedom for Apple II
Kingdom of Kroz	1987	Scott Miller of Apogee Software	
Mtrek	1987	Chuck Peterson of UCSC	
ZZT	1991	Tim Sweeney of Epic MegaGames	
Curses!	1993	Graham Nelson	
MegaZeux	1994	Alexis Janson of Software Visions	Supports editing the character set to allow for more advanced graphical capabilities than most text mode games.
Jigsaw	1995	Graham Nelson	
Chibot Ultra Battle	1999		
PAEE	1999	Enrique D. Bosch	
For a Change	1999	Dan Schmidt	
Shade	2000	Andrew Plotkin	
Shrapnel	2000	Adam Cadre	

== Online games ==
=== Play-by-email games ===
These are play-by-email games played online.

Title	Year Created	Creator
Lords of the Earth	1983	
Quantum Space	1989	
Atlantis PbeM	1993	
Eressea PbeM	1996	

=== BBS door games ===
These are BBS door games played online.

Title	Year Created	Creator
TradeWars 2002	1987	Gary Martin for Martech Software
Legend of the Red Dragon	1989	Seth Able Robinson

=== Text-Based Browser Multiplayer Games ===
Torn City (2003) is played in a web browser and involves multiplayer components: it is based mainly around text and has very limited graphical elements.

== See also ==
- List of graphic adventure games
