= Phoenix (computer) =

IBM mainframe computer

Coordinates: 52.20362°N 0.12023°E

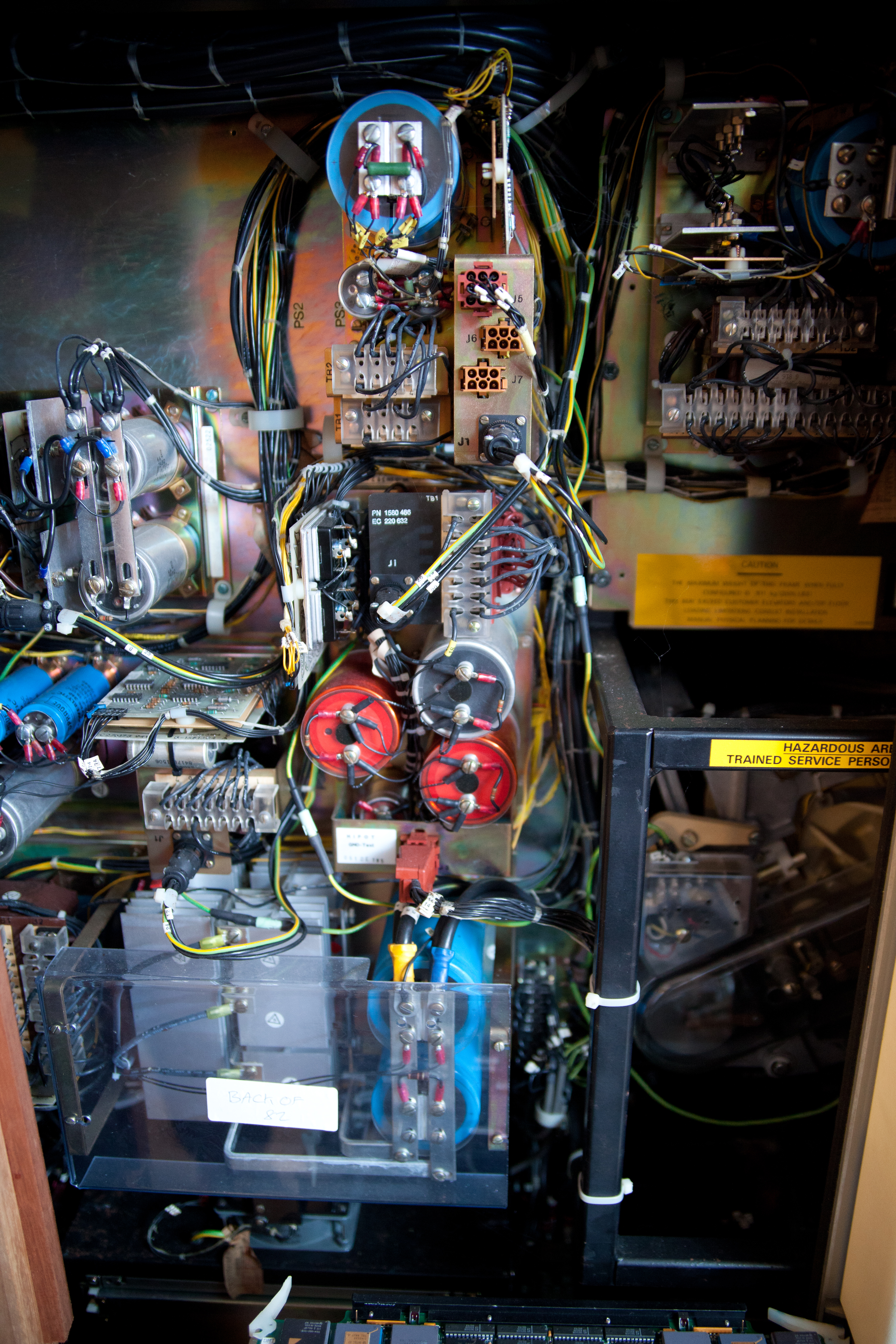
Parts of the power supply for the Phoenix computer at the Jim Austin Collection Near York.

Phoenix (February 1973 – 30 September 1995) was an IBM mainframe computer at Cambridge University's Computer Laboratory. "Phoenix/MVS" was also the name of the computer's operating system, written in-house by Computer Laboratory members. Its DNS hostname was phx.cam.ac.uk.

== Hardware ==
The Phoenix system was an IBM 370/165. It was made available for test purposes to 20 selected users, via consoles in the public console room, in February 1973. The following month, the Computing Service petitioned the Computer Board for an extra mebibyte of store, to double the amount of storage that the machine had. The petition was accepted and the extra store was delivered in September 1973.

== Communications ==
The IBM-supplied Telecommunications Access Method (TCAM) and communications controller were replaced in 1975 by a system, called Parrot, that was created locally by the staff of the Computer Laboratory, comprising their own software and a PDP-11 complex. Their goal in doing so was to provide a better user interface than was available with a standard IBM system, alongside greater flexibility, reliability, and efficiency. They wanted to support 300 terminals. The initial system, supplied in 1972, comprised the PDP-11 emulating an IBM 2703 transmission control unit, which TCAM communicated with just as though it were a 2703. The PDP-11 was used instead of a bank of 2703s because for a projected 300 terminals a bank of 2703s was not scalable, too expensive, and inadequate for the Computing Service's needs, since it required paper tape readers and card punches as well. Even this solution proved to be unsatisfactory, and in 1975 TCAM was replaced by Parrot, with 200 terminals connected to the PDP-11, of which 80 could be simultaneously active. For full technical details of Parrot, see the technical report by Hazel and Stoneley.

== Software ==
The staff were motivated to write their own system software for the IBM installation as a result of their dissatisfaction with IBM's own interactive command interpreter TSO. The initial product of their efforts was a Phoenix command interpreter which completely replaced the TSO command interpreter and was also available as a language for controlling batch job submissions through the use of a single IBM JCL command to invoke the Phoenix command interpreter. The Phoenix command interpreter was based on that of the Titan Multiple Access System which had inline input files and was in service from 1967.

Steve Bourne, who wrote the Bourne Shell for Unix, was at Cambridge in the 1960s and early 1970s. It seems likely that some of the Bourne Shell's constructs in Unix also derived from the Titan command interpreter.

GEC's OS4000 JCL was based on the Phoenix command interpreter.

== Upgrades ==
By 1973 Phoenix had a thousand megabytes of disk space. In 1982 it was upgraded to an IBM 3081D, and in 1989 to an IBM 3084Q.

== Decommissioning ==
The system was decommissioned 24 years after its installation, on 30 September 1995 at 09:17 (by its own clock).

== Help command ==
Phoenix/MVS is remembered for the responses that it gave to its HELP command. One such was the response to the command HELP GOD, to which Phoenix/MVS would reply "Deities must be invoked directly and not via Phoenix MVS."

== Games ==
Interactive fiction games developed on Phoenix using the Acheton system
Game	Year	Authors' names (Phoenix login names in parentheses)
Acheton	1978	Jon Thackray (JGT1), David Seal (DJS6), and Jonathan R. Partington (JRP1)
Murdac	1982	Jonathan R. Partington
Avon	1982	Jonathan R. Partington
Brand X	1979	Jonathan Mestel (AJM8) and Peter Killworth (PDK1)
Hamil	1982	Jonathan R. Partington
Quondam	1980	Rod Underwood (RU10)
Hezarin	1980	Steve Tinney, Alex Shipp, and Jon Thackray
Xeno	1989	Jonathan Mestel
Fyleet	1985	Jonathan R. Partington
Crobe	1986	Jonathan R. Partington
Sangraal	1987	Jonathan R. Partington
Nidus	1987	Adam Atkinson (AJFA1)
Parc	1983	John Rennie (JR26)
Xerb	unknown	Andrew Lipson (ASL1)
Spycatcher	circa 1988	Jonathan R. Partington and Jon Thackray

One recreational activity on Phoenix was the playing of interactive fiction games. Because the games were large and demanded significant machine resources whilst running, they were generally played outside of prime time, when research palled. (The exit message of one game, Fyleet written by Jonathan Partington in 1985, was "Well go and do some work then".) Other games were Advent (a.k.a. Colossal Cave), Zork (a.k.a. Dungeon), and Acheton.

Acheton was created by two Cambridge graduate students, Jon Thackray and David Seal, in 1978–1979, and expanded over the ensuring two years with the aid of Jonathan Partington. It was written with the aid of a game assembler, which, unlike the contemporary ZIL game assembler from Infocom, was freely available for use by all users of Phoenix between 1980 and 1995.

Several large early British games developed on Phoenix were sold commercially for microcomputers by Acornsoft and, later, Topologika. This was comparable to Infocom's contemporaneous commercialisation of the MIT mainframe game Zork. Many of these games were subsequently translated by Graham Nelson to run on the Z-Machine.

The commercial release of Brand X was Philosopher's Quest.

== Bulletin board ==
Phoenix also hosted a lively bulletin board named GROGGS, which fostered the community spirit amongst the machine's users. After Phoenix was decommissioned, GROGGS migrated to a Unix system, and survived until August 2020. A second, more structured bulletin board, ZINQUE, was popularly held to stand for 'Zinque Is Not Quite Unix Either'.

== Wake ==
Phoenix inspired great affection in its users, to such an extent that a wake was held on 1 September 1995 to mourn its passing. A University newsgroup called "ucam.phx.nostalgia" was also created for reminiscences.

== Current location ==
The IBM 3084 was taken out by Prof. Jim Austin after it was shut down. It is now on display at the Computer Sheds computer museum in East Yorkshire, UK.
