= List of people from Lake Charles, Louisiana =

Among the notable people from Lake Charles, Louisiana are:

== Art ==
- Lynda Benglis, sculptor, born in Lake Charles
- Nancy de Grummond, art historian

== Business ==
- G. Lawrence Blankinship Sr. (1913–2005), civic leader and African-American businessman
- Caroline Boudreaux, businesswoman and social entrepreneur
- Christopher Catrambone (b. 1981), Businessman and Humanitarian, founder of Migrant Offshore Aid Station
- William Dore, businessman
- David Filo, billionaire; born in Wisconsin but raised partly in Moss Bluff; co-creator of the Internet portal Yahoo!

== Entertainment ==
- Chris Ardoin, zydeco accordionist and singer
- Blackberri, drag queen
- Sean Patrick Flanery, actor; starred in The Boondock Saints and The Dead Zone television series; born in Lake Charles
- Paul Groves, opera singer
- Ha*Ash, American pop country duo composed of sisters Hanna Nicole (b. 1985) and Ashley Grace (b. 1987)
- Bob Hilton, host of game shows including Truth or Consequences; briefly the announcer for The Price is Right; began his career at KPLC TV
- Zachary Levi, actor, title character in the NBC series Chuck; born in Lake Charles
- Nellie Lutcher, jazz singer, gained some national popularity in the late 1940s and 50s; recorded for Capitol Records
- Mike Murdock, singer-songwriter, televangelist and pastor
- Van Dyke Parks, Mississippi-born composer, singer, musician, and actor; grew up in Lake Charles
- Nic Pizzolatto, writer and producer best known for creating the crime drama True Detective
- Eddie Shuler, founder of Goldband Records; recorded swamp pop, Cajun, and other genres of southern music
- Lucinda Williams, singer-songwriter born in Lake Charles

== Law ==
- Donald Ellsworth Walter, U.S. District Judge for the United States District Court for the Western District of Louisiana; U.S. attorney for the Western District 1969–1977, based in Shreveport; attorney formerly in private practice in Lake Charles

== Literature and journalism ==
- Andre Dubus, author and essayist; born in Lake Charles; educated at McNeese State University
- Tony Kushner, Pulitzer Prize-winning playwright

== Politics ==
- Mark Abraham, state representative for Calcasieu Parish, effective 2016
- James W. Bryan (1834–1897), Louisiana state legislator and mayor of Lake Charles
- Edward M. Carmouche (1921–1990), chairman of the Louisiana Democratic Party, 1966–1968; ally of U.S. President Lyndon B. Johnson
- A. C. Clemons (1921–1992), trucking executive in Jefferson Davis Parish; first Republican member of the Louisiana State Senate since Reconstruction
- Mike Danahay, Democratic state representative for Calcasieu Parish since 2008; sales representative in Lake Charles; graduate of McNeese State University
- Lether Frazar, president of McNeese State University; Lieutenant Governor of Louisiana under Earl Kemp Long, 1956–1960; namesake of the McNeese library
- Harry Hollins, state representative for Calcasieu Parish, 1964–1980
- Sam Houston Jones (b. 1897), 46th Governor of Louisiana born in Merryville, Louisiana; died in 1978 in Lake Charles, where he is interred at Prien Pines Cemetery
- Jesse Knowles, businessman, civic leader, state legislator representing Calcasieu Parish; survivor of the World War II Bataan Death March
- Willie Mount, mayor of Lake Charles (1993–1999)
- Rupert Richardson (1930–2008), African-American civil rights activist and civil rights leader who served as president of the National Association for the Advancement of Colored People (NAACP) from 1992 to 1995
- Victor T. "Vic" Stelly (1941–2020), former state representative; author of the Stelly Plan
- George H. Wells (1833–1905), Northern-born Confederate States of America officer; practiced law in Lake Charles; served in the Louisiana State Senate, 1878–1880

== Science and medicine ==
- Michael E. DeBakey, heart surgeon; first person to successfully implant an artificial heart (1963); member of the Health Care Hall of Fame; recipient of the United Nations Lifetime Achievement Award, the Presidential Medal of Freedom with Distinction, and the National Medal of Science; originator of the M.A.S.H. unit concept; born in Lake Charles; graduate of Lake Charles High School
- Dominic Gorie, astronaut from Lake Charles

== Sports ==
- Terry Burrows, Major League Baseball pitcher; played for the Texas Rangers, Milwaukee Brewers and San Diego Padres
- JT Chargois, Major League Baseball pitcher
- Casey Daigle, baseball pitcher in the Houston Astros organization; husband of softball star Jennie Finch; graduated from Sulphur High School
- Alvin Dark, World Series champion baseball shortstop and manager
- Frank Tritico, American football coach
- Nate Livings, former NFL offensive lineman
- Joe Dumars, former player and current general manager for the Detroit Pistons; played for McNeese State University before going on to have a successful NBA career; named MVP of the 1989 NBA finals; elected to the Basketball Hall of Fame in 2006
- Ray Fontenot, Major League Baseball pitcher, 1983–1986, for the New York Yankees, Chicago Cubs, and Minnesota Twins
- Terry Fontenot, general manager of the Atlanta Falcons
- Matt Forte, starting running back and 2nd round-pick of the Chicago Bears; MVP of the 2008 Senior Bowl
- Garrett Nussmeier, quarterback for the LSU Tigers
- Johnnie Gray, retired NFL safety, played for the Green Bay Packers
- Nickie Hall, former professional athlete in the Canadian Football League
- Mike Heinen, professional golfer; has played on the PGA Tour and Nationwide Tour; former winner of the PGA Shell Houston Open
- Brian Johnson, champion track-and-field athlete; college coach
- Charlie Joiner, retired NFL football player
- Ralph Waldo Emerson Jones (b. 1905), president and baseball coach at Grambling State University, 1936–1977; born in Lake Charles
- Eddie Kennison, retired NFL player, active 1996–2008; graduated from Washington-Marion High School
- Ted Lyons, baseball Hall of Famer who pitched for the Chicago White Sox; born in Lake Charles
- Tommy Mason, former professional football player, first overall pick of 1961 NFL draft by the Minnesota Vikings
- Chad Ogea (b. 1970), pitcher, Major League Baseball (1994–1999), for the Cleveland Indians and Philadelphia Phillies, best known for his performance in the 1997 World Series
- Trey Quinn, professional athlete with the Jacksonville Jaguars of the NFL
- Herbert H. Ramsay (1887–1939) golf administrator and president of the United States Golf Association
- Justin Vincent, former professional football player in the NFL
- Ken Winey (born 1962), former professional athlete in the Canadian Football League
