= Castle of Riddles =

1983 video game

- Developer: Peter Killworth
- Publisher: Acornsoft
- Platforms: Acorn Electron, BBC Micro
- Release: BBC: EU: 1983; Electron: EU: 1984
- Genre: Interactive fiction
- Mode: Single-player

Castle of Riddles is a text adventure released by Acornsoft for the BBC Micro (in 1983) and Acorn Electron (1984) home computers. The game was written by Peter Killworth and was one of a series of text adventures written for, or ported to the BBC Micro by the same author (others including Countdown to Doom and Philosopher's Quest).

Unlike Killworth's other Acornsoft adventures, Castle of Riddles was not updated and reissued by Topologika so it became unavailable after 1985 when Acorn Computers (parent company of Acornsoft) pulled out of the games publishing market. Some of the puzzles however were included in the Topologika version of Philosopher's Quest.

== Plot ==
Opening scene of the game

The player takes the role of a 'professional adventurer' who is 'down to his last silver piece.' He is hired by a wizard whose castle has been taken over by a warlock. The warlock has also found the wizard's Magic Ring of Power which must be returned.

The player navigates the castle, solves puzzles, collects treasures, and avoids booby traps set by the warlock in order to recover the magic ring for the wizard. The castle has three main areas: one has a well and three bears, one has a maze and a shooting gallery, and one has a corridor of doom.

At various moments in the game, the adventurer is asked to answer a riddle. They may also encounter enemy NPCs that need to be dispatched. Treasures that the adventurer collects can be deposited in a safe and kept as payment.

== Gameplay ==
Castle of Riddles is a text-based adventure game. As with all such games, only text is used. The player must use a simple 'verb-noun' format (e.g. 'Go North', 'Get lamp') to control the game. The game responds by displaying text that describes results of the player's actions and/or locations and objects that their character can see.

Points are awarded for picking up treasure and again for depositing it in the safe and completing certain tasks. The maximum possible score is 250. To complete the game, players must collect the following 12 treasures: tiara, necklace, figurine, case, portrait, coin, sculpture, diamond, brooch, clock, mink, and cushion.

To answer the final password, players must solve six riddles. Players have a lamp, which must be used sparingly, as it has enough power to complete the adventure and not more.

== Reception ==
Reception

Review score
Publication	Score
Personal Computer News	3/5 stars

Roger Tiplady, writing in Personal Computer News, recommended the game for those that had a lot of time to devote to it.

CASA gave the game a 7/10, highlighting the quality of the game's puzzles and commenting on the ease of accidentally soft-locking the game.
