= Chalendar =

Chalendar or de Chalendar is a French surname. Notable people with the surname include:

- Isabelle Chalendar, French mathematician
- Pierre-André de Chalendar (born 1958), French businessman
- Roland Chalendar, mayor of Saint-Sauveur-la-Sagne
