= Magic mushroom (disambiguation) =

A magic mushroom is a psilocybin mushroom, a fungus that contain the hallucinogens psilocybin.

Magic mushroom may also refer to:

- Amanita muscaria and other amanita mushrooms

== Music ==
- The Magic Mushrooms, a 1960s psychedelic rock band

== Video games ==
- Magic Mushrooms (video game), a 1985 video game published by Acornsoft
- Magic mushroom (Mario), in older games, i.e. Super Mario Bros. (1985, NES), a Super Mushroom was called a "Magic Mushroom"

== See also ==
- Hallucinogenic mushroom
