= Snapper (video game) =

1982 video game

- Original version with Pac-Man type characters
- Publisher: Acornsoft
- Designer: Jonathan Griffiths
- Platforms: Acorn Atom, Acorn Electron, BBC Micro
- Release: 1982
- Genre: Maze
- Mode: Single player

Snapper is a maze game published by Acornsoft. The game is a video game clone of Namco's arcade game Pac-Man (1980). Two versions of Snapper were initially made, with the BBC Micro version made by Jonathan Griffiths, and one written by Hugo Tyson for the Acorn Atom.

The BBC Micro version was developed by Griffiths after the team agreed upon developing home computer versions of their favourite arcade games. After the BBC Micro version was released, it was re-released with different graphics to have the characters appear different than those in the original Pac-Man game.

== Gameplay ==
As in Pac-Man, bonus items such as fruit sometimes appear in the center of the screen. The highest-scoring bonus item is an acorn, a reference to the publishers. When Snapper is killed, it shrinks and turns into small lines pointing in all directions.

The main difference in gameplay between Pac-Man and Snapper is the behavior of the ghosts (or monsters). In Pac-Man, each ghost has its own personality and follows set patterns for each level. The red ghost also travels at double speed after a certain number of dots are eaten. In Snapper, the monsters begin each level by patrolling their corners a set number of times before breaking from their route to chase the Snapper. The time before breaking the route is reduced for each level until on later levels, the monsters chase Snapper almost immediately. The only real difference between the monsters is the corner they patrol and how soon they break from their route (e.g. the red ghost is always the first). Also, in Pac-Man, the main character slows when eating dots (so ghosts can catch up to him) but this does not happen in Snapper. These changes lead to a game which is much easier in the early levels but gets progressively more difficult so games tend to last longer.

== Development ==
Snapper was published by Acornsoft. Acornsoft was the software division of Acorn Computers and was founded in 1980. Like many of the early games for the company, they Snapper was a video game clone of other arcade games. In the 1970s and early 1980s, video game clones of popular arcade games were rampant, and this growth of clones was followed on home computers. These clones often copied gameplay and had similar names to their original influences.

Two versions of Snapper were made. Prior to the version made by Jonathan Griffiths, there was one written by Hugo Tyson for the Acorn Atom. The later version of Snapper was coded by Griffiths who was working for the game's publisher Acornsoft, a company he joined in September 1981. Prior to working on Snapper While working at Tescos and attending school, he taught himself BASIC programming and later taught himself to code in 6502 assembler. Griffiths sent off some games he developed for the Acornsoft and was offered a job.

At Acornsoft, three of the programmers decided to write versions of their favourite arcade games with the idea of getting as close to the original as possible within the limitations of the screen size. The other programmers made Monsters, a clone of Space Panic (1980) and Planetoid a homage to Defender (1981).

The game was developed in machine code. To make these games, the three first developed a sprite editor followed by a multi-file assembler as the source code for these games would not fit the available random-access memory (RAM). The three programmers worked as a team to develop parts of Snapper, such as coding of the maze in the game. The maze layout in Snapper is reminiscent of that in Pac-Man, but adjusted to fit the scale of the screen for the BBC Micro. Griffiths said the most difficult thing in developing the game was accounting for a dot being eaten as dots in the corners of the maze would not always register as being collected. This led to the game's code not knowing that a level was finished making it impossible to progress.

== Release ==
Later Acorn Electron version with the redesigned characters.

Snapper was released in 1982. Versions of Snapper were released released for the BBC Micro and Acorn Atom. It was re-released by Superior Software after it bought Acornsoft in late 1985.

Initially, Snapper's visuals were more similar to the original Pac-Man (1980), but the graphics had to be changed to make sure the game was not visually the same as the original. Griffiths said he could not recall who was threatening legal action, but said that changes were made in response to the game, making the Snapper have small legs and a green hat and the ghosts being changed to appear more human-like while maintaining their roving eyes.

== Reception ==
John Vaux in Acorn User reviewed three maze games: Bridgeman, Munchyman and Snapper saying that the latter title was "certainly the best on all counts." Vaux complimented that the characters move smoothly and at good speed and that "was more to the game" in Snapper than the other titles.

From retrospective reviews, Peter Connors of Personal Computer Games described it as "the best BBC version of that all-time classic Pac-Man." Darran Jones of Retro Gamer described Snapper as being an excellent maze game that played as good as it looks while saying its repetitive gameplay won't be for everyone. Jones also complimented the fast-paced and the game's tight controls. Griffiths attributed these qualities to programming the games to making it in machine code which led to benefits in speed and memory efficiency.

Reflecting on the game in an interview published in 2016, Griffiths said he had a great deal of pleasure knowing people still enjoyed Snapper, while saying "mostly though, unless you're at least 40, you'd never have heard of my games."
