= Podd =

1984 video game

- Developer: ASK
- Publisher: Acornsoft
- Designer: Don Walton
- Platforms: BBC Micro, Acorn Electron
- Release: 1984
- Genre: Educational
- Mode: Single-player

Awaiting user input

Podd is an educational game for the BBC Micro and Acorn Electron published by Acornsoft in 1984. The main character, Podd, teaches verbs, performing an appropriate animation when a recognised word is typed.

== Gameplay ==
The object of the game is to find the 120 verbs that Podd recognizes. Several words are mapped to one animation (e.g. "walk", "hike", "stroll", etc.), and children who realise this will be able to guess more words by thinking of synonyms for the words that have already been discovered.
