= Fundraising in the 2016 United States presidential election =

Fundraising plays a central role in many presidential campaigns, and is a key factor (others include endorsements/messaging/visits/staffers) in determining the viability of candidates. Money raised is applied for the salaries of non-volunteers in the campaign, transportation, campaign materials, media advertisements and other contingencies. Under United States law, officially declared candidates are required to file campaign finance details with the Federal Election Commission (FEC) at the end of every calendar month or quarter. Summaries of these reports are made available to the public shortly thereafter, revealing the relative financial situations of all the campaigns.

However, because of relatively recent changes to campaign finance laws (especially Citizens United v. FEC and McCutcheon v. FEC among others), the fundraising by nominally independent committees will be especially important in 2015 and 2016, perhaps outstripping money raised by the officially declared campaigns. Candidates not currently holding elected office, including Martin O'Malley, Jeb Bush, Scott Walker, and Rick Santorum made their official campaign announcements relatively later than is usual in presidential elections, instead concentrating on their fundraising vehicles, which can collect unlimited sums. By contrast, other candidates including Ted Cruz, Rand Paul, and Marco Rubio were some of the earliest candidates to announce, because as sitting federal Senators they are constrained by campaign-finance limits with regard to nominally independent groups whether or not they are officially declared. All three of these candidates have leadership PACs; many of the nominally independent outside groups are also 501(c)(3) and/or 501(c)(4) organizations, which are legally distinct from 527 organizations (which themselves have many variations). Many campaigns are using at least two or three or four legal entities for fundraising; some campaigns, such as those of Ben Carson, Ted Cruz, and Rick Perry, are utilizing multiple fundraising vehicles of the same (legal) category, to permit donors more fine-grained control over how their money is utilized. Outside spending is expected to play a much larger role in 2016, than it did in 2012, which was the first presidential election after the landmark 2010 decision.

As of July 2015, early fundraising totals for the candidates in the 2016 race have ranged from the millions of dollars to over a hundred million dollars. According to Republican National Committee member Henry Barbour of Mississippi, although some candidates will raise over $50 million during the course of 2015, in order to be competitive candidates will need to raise at least $10 million to $15 million during the course of 2015 (prior to the caucus and primary elections in early 2016). As of July 2015, candidates for the Democratic Party who have already raised at least $10 million include Hillary Clinton and Bernie Sanders, with Martin O'Malley coming in a distant third with approximately $2 million. Also as of July 2015, candidates for the Republican Party who have already raised at least $10 million include Jeb Bush, Ted Cruz, Marco Rubio, Rick Perry, Rand Paul, John Kasich, Chris Christie, and Ben Carson. Numbers for Scott Walker were not yet disclosed as of mid-July. Coming in 9th place and above (or 8th place and above if Walker is elided) was Bobby Jindal with ~$9m, Mike Huckabee with ~$8m, and Carly Fiorina with ~$5m. Finally, although Donald Trump raised ~$2m dollars from his campaign-announcement in mid-June through the end of the reporting period on June 30, 2015, he has a personal net worth in the billions of dollars, and has stated he will self-finance his campaign.

== 4th Quarter 2015 ==
Selected campaign-specific finance information through December 31, 2015, according to the FEC.

Republicans 2015q4

Candidate	Money Raised	Itemized	Loans Received	Money Spent	Cash On Hand	Money Transfers (from other accounts)	Total Debt	Refunds
Ben Carson	$22,627,101.70	%	$	$27,331,988.58	$6,567,647.25	$	$0.00	$
Ted Cruz	$20,519,558.79	%	$	$15,563,668.37	$18,734,794.46	$	$862,619.59	$
Marco Rubio	$14,194,453.68	%	$	$14,771,849.55	$10,398,592.91	$	$0.00	$
Donald Trump	$13,576,294.86	%	$	$6,866,742.86	$6,964,324.88	$	$12,620,297.41	$
Jeb Bush	$7,107,370.17	%	$	$9,788,641.23	$7,589,858.03	$	$155,989.19	$
John Kasich	$3,193,731.54	%	$	$3,333,575.92	$2,537,300.60	$	$0.00	$
Chris Christie	$2,950,344.25	%	$	$3,210,633.55	$1,126,158.09	$	$61,917.77	$
Carly Fiorina	$2,853,044.05	%	$	$3,917,931.25	$4,484,307.21	$	$0.00	$
Rand Paul	$2,077,407.36	%	$	$2,931,491.38	$1,270,071.50	$	$248,367.72	$
Lindsey Graham	$866,499.29	%	$	$1,983,690.88	$534,117.54	$	$0.00	$
Mike Huckabee	$703,945.74	%	$	$1,332,112.32	$133,244.38	$	$49,471.33	$
Bobby Jindal	$284,266.62	%	$	$545,205.63	$0.00	$	$0.00	$
Rick Santorum	$247,627.45	%	$	$431,233.58	$42,919.79	$	$167,401.36	$
George Pataki	$102,077.26	%	$	$129,111.92	$19,332.33	$	$20,000.00	$

Democrats 2015q4

Candidate	Money Raised	Itemized	Loans Received	Money Spent	Cash On Hand	Money Transfers (from other accounts)	Total Debt	Refunds
Hillary Clinton	$38,092,325.12	%	$	$33,109,849.90	$37,977,647.61	$	$978,863.24	$
Bernie Sanders	$33,559,367.73	%	$	$32,374,323.69	$28,304,765.54	$	$0.00	$
Martin O'Malley	$1,502,107.92	%	$	$2,138,652.30	$169,442.45	$	$535,477.30	$
Jim Webb	$68,020.12	%	$	$177,943.85	$206,841.61	$	$0.00	$

Key:	Withdrew prior to end of quarter

== 3rd Quarter 2015 ==
Selected campaign-specific finance information through September 30, 2015, according to the FEC.

Republicans 2015q3

Candidate	Money Raised	Itemized	Loans Received	Money Spent	Cash On Hand	Money Transfers (from other accounts)	Total Debt	Refunds
Ben Carson	$20,767,266.51	%	$	$14,240,044.51	$11,272,534.13	$	$25,000.00	$
Jeb Bush	$13,384,832.06	%	$	$11,465,513.30	$10,271,129.09	$	$404,737.38	$
Ted Cruz	$12,218,137.71	57%	$0	$6,966,829.60	$13,778,904.04	$28,495	$0.00	$79,259
Scott Walker	$7,376,470.56	%	$	$6,393,957.13	$982,513.43	$	$161,133.45	$
Carly Fiorina	$6,791,308.76	%	$	$2,232,773.15	$5,549,194.41	$	$0.00	$
Marco Rubio	$5,724,784.46	78%	$1,437	$4,607,861.17	$10,975,988.78	$34,201	$75,902.33	$163,672
John Kasich	$4,388,168.30	%	$	$1,711,488.32	$2,676,679.98	$	$0.00	$
Chris Christie	$4,208,984.49	%	$	$2,822,537.10	$1,386,447.39	$	$246,346.89	$
Donald Trump	$3,926,511.65	%	$	$4,159,474.93	$254,772.88	$	$1,804,747.23	$
Lindsey Graham	$2,582,819.11	%	$	$1,052,657.62	$1,651,309.13	$	$0.00	$
Rand Paul	$2,509,251.63	%	$	$4,546,611.25	$2,124,155.52	$	$365,359.11	$
Mike Huckabee	$1,241,737.51	%	$	$1,365,797.56	$761,410.96	$	$133,104.20	$
Bobby Jindal	$579,438.39	%	$	$832,214.02	$260,939.01	$	$0.00	$
Rick Santorum	$387,985.42	%	$	$393,477.76	$226,525.92	$	$67,350.89	$
Rick Perry	$287,199.29	%	$	$1,126,558.82	$44,553.59	$	$0.00	$
George Pataki	$153,513.89	%	$	$347,563.59	$13,570.55	$	$20,000.00	$

Democrats 2015q3

Candidate	Money Raised	Itemized	Loans Received	Money Spent	Cash On Hand	Money Transfers (from other accounts)	Total Debt	Refunds
Hillary Clinton	$29,921,653.91	%	$	$25,776,617.14	$32,995,172.39	$	$647,245.10	$
Bernie Sanders	$26,216,430.38	%	$	$11,258,446.55	$27,119,721.50	$	$0.00	$
Martin O'Malley	$1,282,820.92	%	$	$1,790,970.11	$805,986.83	$	$20,607.50	$
Jim Webb	$696,972.18	%	$	$380,206.84	$316,765.34	$	$0.00	$

Key:	Withdrew prior to end of quarter

== 2nd Quarter 2015 ==
Campaign-specific finance information through June 30, 2015, according to the FEC as of the quarterly filing deadline (July 15, 2015). Information on fundraising via affiliated super PACs is filed semi-annually, with a deadline of July 31, 2015 for the super PAC fundraising of January 1, 2015 through June 30, 2015. As of July 19, affiliated entities of the campaigns for Ben Carson, Martin O'Malley, and Rand Paul are still pending.

Democrats 2015q2

Candidate	Money Raised	Itemized	Loans Received	Money Spent	Cash On Hand	Money Transfers (from other accounts)	Total Debt	Refunds
Hillary Clinton	$47,549,949.64	82.7%	$0.00	$18,699,814.02	$28,850,135.62	$0.00	$574,147.67	$496,075.76
Bernie Sanders	$15,247,353.43	23.9%	$0.00	$3,085,615.76	$12,161,737.67	$1,500,000.00	$0.00	$132,668.88
Martin O'Malley	$	%	$	$	$	$	$	$

Republicans 2015q2

Candidate	Money Raised	Itemized	Loans Received	Money Spent	Cash On Hand	Money Transfers (from other accounts)	Total Debt	Refunds
Ted Cruz	$10,043,380.09	60.5%	$0.00	$5,450,051.61	$8,527,595.93	$0.00	$618,006.57	$49,486.00
Ben Carson	$8,469,048.33	32.8%	$0.00	$5,416,772.63	$4,745,312.13	$0.00	$0.00	$11,850.84
Mike Huckabee	$2,004,462.73	70.8%	$0.00	$1,118,991.72	$885,471.01	$0.00	$11,334.25	$7,150.00
Carly Fiorina	$1,704,703.74	57.2%	$0.00	$714,044.94	$990,658.80	$0.00	$0.00	$5,575.00
Jeb Bush	$	%	$	$	$	$	$	$
Bobby Jindal	$	%	$	$	$	$	$	$
Lindsey Graham	$	%	$	$	$	$	$	$
Marco Rubio	$8,872,907	%	$	$3,079,705	$9,859,065	$	$	$
George Pataki	$	%	$	$	$	$	$	$
Rick Perry	$	%	$	$	$	$	$	$
Rand Paul	$	%	$	$	$	$	$	$
Rick Santorum	$	%	$	$	$	$	$	$

== 1st Quarter 2015 ==
Campaign-specific finance information through March 30, 2015, according to the FEC as of the quarterly filing deadline (April 15, 2015). Information on fundraising via affiliated super PACs is filed semi-annually, with a deadline of July 31, 2015 for the super PAC fundraising of January 1, 2015 through June 30, 2015.

Democrats 2015q1

None had officially declared, prior to the FEC deadline.

Republicans 2015q1

Candidate	Money Raised	Itemized	Loans Received	Money Spent	Cash On Hand	Money Transfers (from other accounts)	Total Debt	Refunds
Ted Cruz	$4,305,780.46	55.5%	$0.00	$371,513.01	$3,934,267.45	$250,012.93	$0.00	$0.00
Ben Carson	$2,173,193.77	29.3%	$25,000	$480,157.34	$1,693,036.43	$0.00	$25,000	$0.00

Key:	Withdrew prior to end of quarter

Independents

== See also ==
- Invisible/Money primary
- Foster Friess and William Dore, megadonors who backed Santorum'12
- Sheldon Adelson, megadonor who backed Gingrich'12
