= The Meteor, the Stone and a Long Glass of Sherbet =

1996 video game

- Game being played in a modern interpreter.
- Developer(s): Graham Nelson
- Publisher(s): Self published
- Designer(s): Graham Nelson
- Engine: Z-machine
- Platform(s): Z-machine
- Release: 1996
- Genre(s): Interactive Fiction, Aventure
- Mode(s): Single player

The Meteor, the Stone and a Long Glass of Sherbet is a 1996 work of interactive fiction by Graham Nelson, distributed in z-code format as freeware. It won the 1996 Interactive Fiction Competition after being entered pseudonymously under the name "Angela M. Horns" (an anagram of "Graham Nelson"). The game is set in the Zork universe created by Infocom, or a copy of that universe. Nelson has described the connection to the Zork universe as "tenuous." Sherbet uses a similarly light-hearted style to the original Zork games. The game resembles a traditional Zork-style dungeon-crawl, with some additional twists.
