= Business Games =

- Developer: AJ Reeve
- Publisher: Acornsoft
- Platforms: Acorn Electron, BBC Micro
- Release: 1983: BBC; 1984: Electron
- Genres: Business simulation, Educational

Business Games is a collection of two business simulation games for the BBC Micro published in 1983 by Acornsoft. An Acorn Electron version followed in 1984. The included games are Stokmark and Telemark.

== Gameplay ==
=== Stokmark ===
Stokmark is a simulation of the stock market. Up to eight players take turns to either buy or sell shares in a choice of four companies. As well as the price, players are given the price-to-earnings ratio and dividend yield. Prices change instantly when transactions are made (usually based on the standard supply and demand principle although there is a random element). After each round a news story is displayed which affects the value of certain shares. After every four rounds, players are awarded dividends on the shares they hold and are ranked on their total current value (of both cash and shares). The object of the game is to make the largest amount of profit.

=== Telemark ===
Telemark is a four player game where each player has to make decisions based on the manufacturing of televisions. This includes whether to build or extend factories, spend on improving management or marketing, and setting the price. When the player enters their price, it is not displayed on the screen so other players do not know what their competitors are charging until the end of each round. The game introduces terms and reports such as market share, overheads, profit and loss accounts and balance sheets. The instruction booklet provides detailed instructions on working out the break-even point as well as blank worksheets to be filled out by the players. The winner is the player who has made the most profit after a set number of rounds or the first player to gain more than half the market share for televisions.

== Release ==
Business Games was released in 1983 as part of Acornsoft's Education range which was aimed at schools as well as home users. As it only requires 16k RAM, it runs on the BBC Micro Model A as well as the Model B. It was also released for the Acorn Electron in 1984. The instructions recommend the games for teaching business and economic studies but the Acorn Electron version in particular was well known among home users, as it was often included with the Acornsoft software packs bundled with Electrons in 1984 and 1985.

== Reception ==
The package was reviewed by Ken Garrett for The Micro User which was largely positive. Stokmark was described as "a well-presented and useful introduction to some investment terms" but also "rather repetitive". He claimed Telemark is "a good game and to be properly appreciated must be played seriously".
