= Gigabyte (virus writer) =

Virus writer

Kimberley Vanvaeck, also known by her online moniker Gigabyte, is a virus writer from Belgium known for a long-standing dispute which involved the internet security firm Sophos and one of its employees, Graham Cluley. Vanvaeck wrote several viruses, including Quis, Coconut and YahaSux (also called Sahay). She also created a Sharp virus (also called "Sharpei"), credited as being the first virus to be written in C#.

Vanvaeck's dispute with Cluley began after he made several comments concerning the gender of virus writers. This prompted Vanvaeck to write several viruses, that specifically targeted Cluley which were stated to be written as proof-of-concept rather than releasing them in the wild.
