= Jonathan Partington =

English mathematician

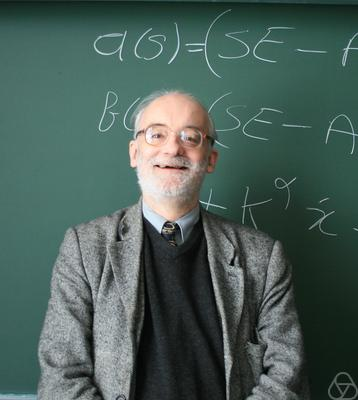
- Born: 4 February 1955 (age 71); Norwich, England
- Education: University of Cambridge
- Known for: Operator theory, Complex Analysis, Control theory
- Scientific career
- Fields: Mathematics
- Workplaces: University of Leeds
- Doctoral advisor: Béla Bollobás

Jonathan Richard Partington (born 4 February 1955) is an English mathematician who is Emeritus Professor of pure mathematics at the University of Leeds.

== Education ==
Professor Partington was educated at Gresham's School, Holt, and Trinity College, Cambridge, where he completed his PhD thesis entitled "Numerical ranges and the Geometry of Banach Spaces" under the supervision of Béla Bollobás.

== Career ==
Partington works in the area of operator theory and complex analysis, sometimes applied to control theory, and is the author of several books in this area. He was formerly editor-in-chief of the Journal of the London Mathematical Society, a position he held jointly with his Leeds colleague John Truss.

Partington's extra-mathematical activities include the invention of the March March march, an annual walk starting at March, Cambridgeshire. He is also known as a writer or co-writer of some of the earliest British text-based computer games, including Acheton, Hamil, Murdac, Avon, Fyleet, Crobe, Sangraal, and SpySnatcher, which started life on the Phoenix computer system at the University of Cambridge Computer Laboratory. These are still available on the IF Archive.

== Books ==
- Partington, Jonathan R. (24 February 1989). An Introduction to Hankel Operators. Cambridge University Press. doi:10.1017/cbo9780511623769. ISBN 978-0-521-36611-3.
- Partington, Jonathan R. (1997). Interpolation, identification, and sampling. Oxford: Clarendon Press. ISBN 0-19-850024-6. OCLC 36681729.
- Partington, Jonathan R. (15 March 2004). Linear Operators and Linear Systems. Cambridge University Press. doi:10.1017/cbo9780511616693. ISBN 978-0-521-83734-7.
- Chalendar, Isabelle; Partington, Jonathan R. (18 August 2011). Modern Approaches to the Invariant-Subspace Problem. Cambridge University Press. doi:10.1017/cbo9780511862434. ISBN 978-0-511-86243-4.
