= Ron Schnell =

American chief technology officer

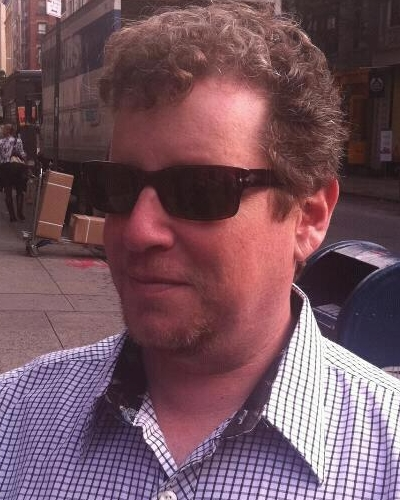
- Ron Schnell in 2011
- Born: November 10, 1966 (age 59); New York City
- Other names: Ronnie Schnell, Ronald Steven Schnell
- Education: Syracuse University
- Known for: speaking at NYU (age 14), co-founder of Mail Call, CTO of Paul'16
- Website: www.driver-aces.com/ronnie.html

Ronald Steven Schnell (born November 10, 1966) is an American computer programmer in Weston, Florida. He was co-founder of Mail Call in 1997 and the chief technology officer of Rand Paul's 2016 presidential campaign.

== Life and work ==
Schnell began programming in 1975 (age nine), on the IBM 360 mainframe. In 1981, he tested and spoke about SETL (for VAX minicomputers) at NYU's Courant Institute. In 1982, Schnell wrote a chat program for Telenet called NET-TALK, while at the Maryland timesharing company Dialcom; this led to helping test the BBC Micro. Schnell wrote the text adventure game DUNNET in 1983 for MacLisp (Note: http://www.driver-aces.com/ronnie.html#dunnet) and 1992 for Emacs Lisp. After high school, Schnell attended Syracuse University from 1984 through 1986, (Note: http://www.driver-aces.com/ronnie.html#university) and was a DJ on WJPZ-FM

Between late 1986 and throughout the 1990s, Schnell was a Unix kernel consultant. (Note: http://www.driver-aces.com/ronnie.html#unix) He moved to the west coast, and founded his first startup in 1990, Secure Online Systems. He co-founded Mail Call in 1997 in Florida; the product used IVR and back-end text-to-speech (subscribers could call a toll-free number, and check their email via the telephone—Mail Call was before the invention of the smartphone). From 2002 to 2005, Schnell was a divisional vice president at Equifax. Schnell was general manager of The Technical Committee in Seattle, a court-mandated computer-software-nonprofit that monitored Microsoft's compliance with a federal court ruling.

Starting in 2013, Schnell became an adjunct professor of Computer Security at Nova Southeastern University. In 2015, Schnell also became CTO of the Rand Paul presidential campaign; he hosted a hackathon in San Francisco during July 2015. Schnell designed the app (Note: Released in September 2015; works on most iOS v8+ and also Android v2.3.3+ smartphones.) for Paul'16 (featuring a hidden game, vote feedback, donations, and virtual-selfies).

== Personal life ==
Schnell was married in 1994, and has two children. Schnell's home automation system, which he helped specify, was profiled in 1998. Schnell plays Segway polo, and in 2007 co-founded the Polo Bears team.
