= Labyrinth (1984 video game) =

- Developer(s): Michael Mathison
- Publisher(s): Acornsoft
- Platform(s): BBC Micro
- Release: 1984
- Genre(s): Action-adventure
- Mode(s): Single-player

Labyrinth is an action-adventure game published in 1984 by Acornsoft for the BBC Micro. Its author, Michael Mathison, describes it as:

an amalgam of what I'd seen and liked visually and I wanted to make something like an 'arcade' version of an adventure game - with lots of creatures and lots of running around shooting at things but also with some simple puzzle elements.

== Gameplay ==
Labyrinth consists of a complex labyrinth made up of multiple levels. Each level is made up of a number of rooms, with the player only able to see a single room at any one time. Doorways are provided allowing the player to move between rooms.

Each level contains two special rooms: the "Gate Room," and the "Key Room". The Gate Room contains the doorway to the next level which is barred by a deadly forcefield. The Key Room contains a magical crystal which will remove the forcefield, and is generally the most well-guarded and dangerous room in the level.

Rooms are populated with a variety of monsters which become more dangerous as the player progresses through the game as they move more quickly, shoot at the player, or lay poisonous mushrooms. The player can choose to avoid the various monsters (though they may well follow the player through the labyrinth), or try to kill them by shooting at them (though some monsters are invulnerable in this way and reflect the shots back), or squash them with a "boulder" that the player is able to push around with them as they travel (trickier and more risky than shooting and therefore scores more points). Colliding with a monster will kill it but causes the player to lose health, often leading to the player's death.

Different types of fruit are scattered throughout the labyrinth, which will increase the player's health when eaten. The player slowly loses health at all times while in the Labyrinth, and will eventually die if they don't progress through the game.

== Legacy ==
In 1987 the game was reissued on Superior Software's Acornsoft Hits compilation.
