= Eressea (video game) =

1996 video game

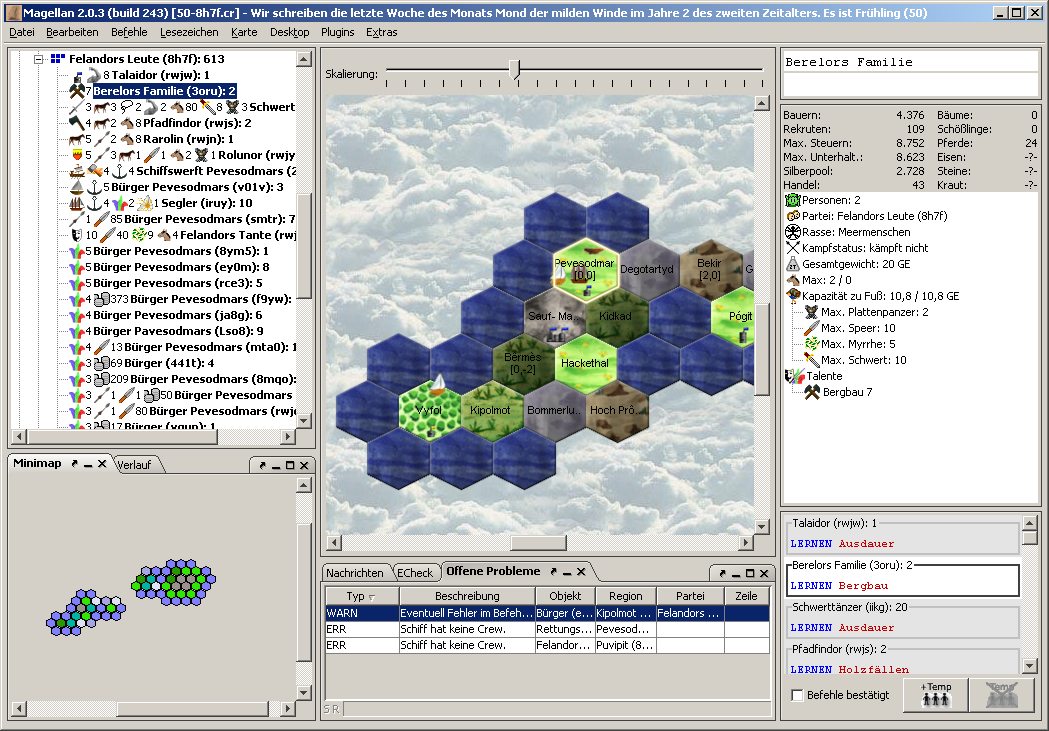
- Screenshot of the game
- Developer(s): Eressea
- Designer(s): Enno Rehling, Christian Schlittchen, Katja Zedel
- Platform(s): Cross-platform, E-mail
- Release: August 27, 1996
- Genre(s): Turn-based strategy
- Mode(s): Multi player

Eressea is an open-ended multi-player computer moderated fantasy turn-based strategy game world for any number of players. Players interact with the game via email. As of August 2006, the game has over 900 players, and has had weekly turns since August 27, 1996.

== Gameplay ==
The game world is populated by many races and monsters. It consists mainly of player-populated islands separated by oceans, and players control a growing number of units of a given race to build empires, armies and fleets.

Like most open-ended games, Eressea has no declared objective, it cannot be "won". It is possible to start playing even now, years into the game, and while some players have been playing their empire for many years, several new ones join every turn. Playing is free, although signups for German players (who make up 80% of the population of Eressea) have now been tied to a donation for an animal conservation charity.

== Development ==
The game was originally based on a very early version of Atlantis, but has been developed since 1996 independently of the original. The game is internationalized with support for English- and German-language play.
