= HAUNT =

- Developer: John E. Laird
- Platforms: DEC-10, DEC-20
- Release: 1979
- Genre: Text adventure
- Mode: Single-player

Haunt was a straightforward but engagingly irreverent text-based mainframe computer game. It was created in OPS4 language in 1979 by John E. Laird.

In Haunt, the player explores a haunted house and encounters clues (flight speed of an African swallow), wacky creatures (rampaging moose), and random elements (the bus) as s/he tries to find treasure and escape the house alive.

The game ran on DEC-10 & DEC-20 mainframes running TOPS-10 or TOPS-20. According to the author, copies exist somewhere in Carnegie Mellon University's archive; although Laird considered rewriting it in an updated language, that did not happen. On his personal website, Laird wrote "I'm afraid that Haunt is really dead."

In 1998 the source code of the partly ported version was given to the Interactive Fiction Archive for publication.

Laird is now a professor at University of Michigan. As he describes: "It violated most, if not all, of the design guidelines for good interactive fiction in that you could get killed much too easily, the puzzles were way too obscure (many based on Saturday morning cartoons from my youth), but it had a certain charm."

== See also ==
- List of text-based computer games
