= Ocean Modelling =

Peer-reviewed scientific journal published by Elsevier

- Discipline: Physical oceanography, ocean modeling
- Language: English
- Edited by: Fangli Qiao, Joanna Staneva

Publication details
- History: 1999–present
- Publisher: Elsevier
- Frequency: Bimonthly
- Open access: Hybrid

Standard abbreviations
- ISO 4: Ocean Model.

Indexing
- ISSN: 1463-5003 (print); 1463-5011 (web)
- LCCN: 00248164
- OCLC no.: 43323816

Links
- Journal homepage; Online archive

Ocean Modelling is a peer-reviewed scientific journal published by Elsevier. It covers research on ocean modeling. The journal was established in 1999 as the successor to a newsletter of the same name, with Peter Killworth as its founding editor.

== Scope and content ==
The journal publishes research on all aspects of ocean modeling. Its subjects include models of ocean circulation, surface waves, tides, sea ice, marine ecosystems, biogeochemical processes, sediments, climate models, and Earth system models; and the technology of model development, such as data assimilation, high-performance computing, and artificial intelligence. It also accepts laboratory experiments and studies that combine models with observations. Its articles are research papers, reviews, short communications, and brief perspective papers.

In 2008 Elsevier gave the journal's main objective as "to provide rapid communication between those interested in ocean modelling, whether through direct observation, or through analytical, numerical or laboratory models". The journal also welcomed work on interactions between physical and biological or biogeochemical processes, and on the influence of the ocean and the atmosphere on each other.

== See also ==
- List of earth and atmospheric sciences journals
- List of ocean circulation models
