= Music Box (software) =

- Developer(s): Topologika
- Initial release: 1995
- Operating system: RISC OS
- Platform: Acorn Archimedes
- License: Proprietary commercial software

Music Box is educational software which teaches about computer-generated music. At the 1995 BETT Educational Computing & Technology Awards, the software won Gold in the primary category.
