= Peter Killworth =

English scientist

- Born: Peter D. Killworth; 27 March 1946; Birmingham, England
- Died: 28 January 2008 (aged 61); Southampton, England
- Education: Trinity College, Cambridge (1969); Trinity College, Cambridge (1972) PhD
- Occupations: Scientist, writer, pioneering author, professor
- Known for: Oceanography; Social Network theory

Professor Peter D. Killworth (27 March 1946 – 28 January 2008) was an English scientist known for his work on oceanography and on the study of social networks. A prolific writer, he published more than 160 scientific papers over the course of his career. He was also known for his work as a pioneering author of text interactive fiction games during the early 1980s.

Peter Killworth died in 2008 from motor neurone disease.

== Oceanography ==
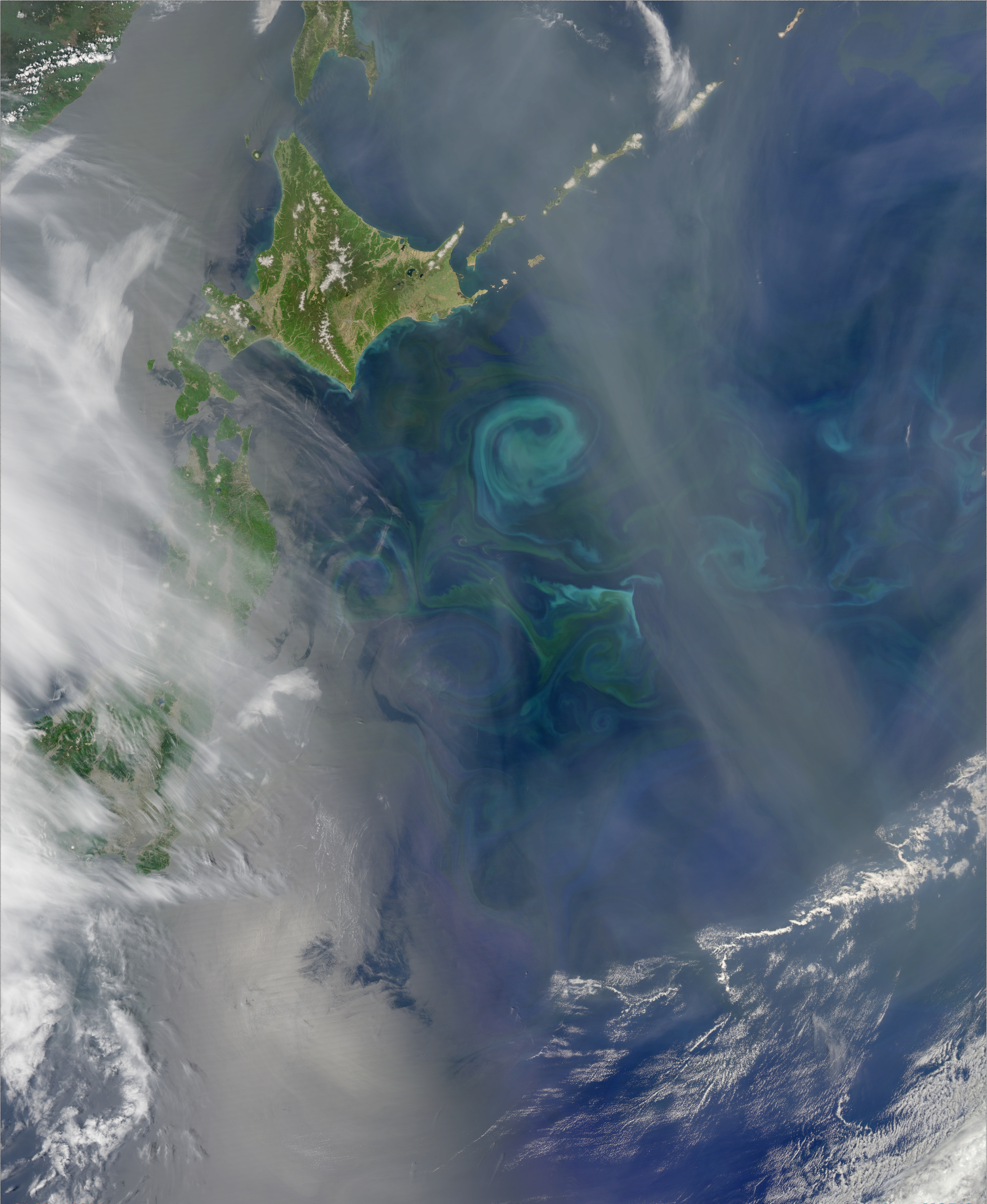
When two currents (in this case the Oyashio and Kuroshio currents) collide, they create eddies – modelling this sort of event was a key part of Peter Killworth's career.

The major part of Peter Killworth's career was spent as an oceanographer, using applied mathematics to understand ocean dynamics. He had varied interests across the whole of physical oceanography, including the study of ice, polynyas, Rossby waves, instabilities and eddies. He completed his doctorate in Numerical studies in Dynamical Oceanography at Trinity College, Cambridge University in 1972. After a year conducting research in California, he returned to Cambridge to work with his former PhD supervisor, Adrian Gill and spent the next twelve years at the Department of Applied Mathematics and Theoretical Physics, the latter part of this being spent as a Research Fellow of Clare Hall. He maintained close ties to the US during this period, including teaching at the Woods Hole Oceanographic Institution.

In 1985 he moved to Oxford to join the Robert Hooke Institute, also serving as a Research Fellow of Wolfson College, and later as a Fellow of St Cross College. In Oxford he "built and led a research team at the forefront of numerical ocean modelling". With the closure of the Institute, by then the NERC Oceanography Unit, he moved to Southampton in 1995 to build up a team at the Southampton Oceanography Centre, now the National Oceanography Centre, Southampton, focusing on ocean process modelling. During these years he established the journal Ocean Modelling, which rapidly became one of the leading oceanographic journals, achieving the highest impact factor of any physical oceanographic journal in 2005.

Killworth's work was marked by several awards, including a Fellowship from the American Geophysical Union in 2000; the Fridtjof Nansen Medal from the European Geophysical Society in 2002; and the Stommel Research Medal from the American Meteorological Society in 2008 for his "many important contributions to ocean modelling and theoretical oceanography". After his death in 2008, the UK National Oceanography Centre established the Peter Killworth Memorial Fund to "provide an annual award to students to support their research, studies and professional development" and "to honour Peter's commitment to fostering and encouraging the careers of budding scientists."

== Social networks ==
The small world theory model.

Killworth was also known for his work on social networks, applying mathematical modelling to anthropological empirical research. His work in this area began in 1972, when he met American anthropologist H. Russell Bernard, whilst both men were working at the Scripps Institution of Oceanography in California. Bernard had been conducting research on an oceanographic ship, examining how different social actors interrelated and knew one another. Killworth proposed applying the 'Baltimore traffic problem algorithm' to the research challenges this presented. Over the next few years, the partnership would work extensively on the so-called "small world", examining differences in the answers to questions such as "how many people does the average person think they know?" and "how many people does the average person really know?"

Killworth's interest in social networks increasingly focused on answering challenging questions about issues on which responses from individuals in questionnaires could not be trusted or were unlikely to be reliable, and where direct empirical data was lacking – "apparently uncountable populations". He was keen to stress the practical implications of this sort of anthropology, highlighting that before "we decide how much money to spend on a social problem, we need to know how big the problem is. It may not matter to anyone but scientists whether the typical American knows 290 people or 2,900, but it matters a lot if we can tell whether populations like the homeless are increasing or decreasing." Killworth was proud of his modelling's contribution to accurately measuring key issues such as the real size of the HIV+ community, or the number of rape victims in given communities.

One academic outcome from this work was a challenge to Dunbar's number theorem. Dunbar's number theorem suggests a theoretical cognitive limit to the number of people with whom one can maintain stable social relationships. These are relationships in which an individual knows who each person is, and how each person relates to every other person. Dunbar's number is not derived from systematic observation of the number of relationships that people living in the contemporary world have. Killworth and his associates did a number of field studies in the United States that came up with an estimated mean number of ties – 290 – that is roughly double Dunbar's estimate. This was not an average of study averages or a theoretical hypothesis but a repeated finding. In 1997, Killworth and Bernard formed the keynote speakers at the International Network for Social Network Analysis annual "Sunbelt" meeting, presenting on this accumulated work.

Although perhaps best known for his work with Bernard, Killworth also conducted a range of work with social network researchers Chris McCarty, Gene Shelley and Gene Johnsen.

== Software design ==
During the late 1970s and early 1980s, the Department of Applied Mathematics and Theoretical Physics in Cambridge was the centre of much early interactive fiction text adventure software in the UK, using the Phoenix computer system there. Peter Killworth wrote the groundbreaking mainframe computer game Brand X with fellow mathematician Jonathan Mestel. With the software arm of Acorn Computers based just around the corner from his Cambridge department, it was not long before Acornsoft acquired the rights to Brand X, which was released commercially for the BBC Micro computer as Philosopher's Quest. Other games followed, including Castle of Riddles, Countdown to Doom, Return to Doom and Last Days of Doom, the latter games released through Topologika. Killworth described these games as "unashamed puzzlefests, you can die in lots of (hopefully funny) ways – but undo will cure that – and it's very easy to get stuck." Killworth published a book on the writing and theory of text adventure games in 1984.

Killworth also turned his hand to other programming applications, and "worked on top RISC OS graph plotting program Tau after taking over the software from original author Tim Birks. He was also a frequent contributor to the ongoing design of the EasiWriter and TechWriter packages, published by Icon Technology.

== Other interests ==
Peter Killworth was also a keen amateur magician, and a member of the Cambridge University Pentacle Club for many years. He authored the Paul Daniels' Magic Show release under the Acornsoft Graphics brand for the BBC Micro computer in 1984, which provided a range of magical illusions to be conducted using early micro-computers.
