= Caroline Boudreaux =

American businesswoman

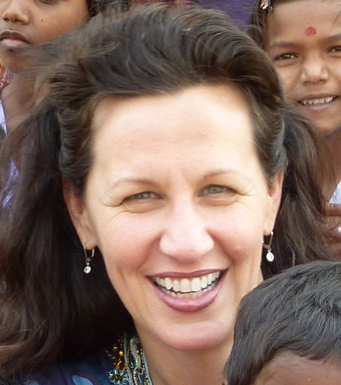
- Caroline Boudreaux in 2010
- Born: Lake Charles, Louisiana, U.S.
- Education: Louisiana State University
- Occupation: Social entrepreneur
- Known for: Miracle Foundation founder
- Awards: Humanitarian Award from the UN's Austin chapter

Caroline Boudreaux is an American businesswoman and social entrepreneur. In 2000, she left her career in TV advertising to found Texas-based international nonprofit Miracle Foundation.

== Early life and education ==
Boudreaux was born in Lake Charles, Louisiana. Her father worked as a pharmacist in the family store and her mother was a social worker. She earned a Bachelor of Science in psychology from Louisiana State University and planned to be a therapist. In 1992, she moved to Austin after applying to graduate school at the University of Texas at Austin but was not accepted.

== Miracle Foundation ==
After working for nine years as an account executive at a Fox TV station in Austin, Boudreaux felt dissatisfied with her life. Asking God to reveal her purpose, Boudreaux promised she would act once it was shown to her. She had quit her job and was traveling with a friend Mother's Day 2000 when they visited an orphanage in Choudwar, India, where they saw over 100 children without enough food, care, or sanitary living conditions. It was there she met a one year old girl who seemed to especially need emotional attention, so she picked her up and sang her a lullaby. She then realized she wanted to improve the lives of children living in these orphanages. Returning to Austin in the Fall of 2000 to work towards that goal, she initially depleted her savings until members of her community gave her some advice and help.

The nonprofit she founded, The Miracle Foundation, began as an international adoption agency but shifted focus after Boudreaux discovered widespread corruption in India and the limited impact with only about 20 children adopted a year. With millions of orphans in India, she realized the greatest need was among those not eligible for adoption and committed to improving their lives in orphanages. Working with an Indian partner to build orphanages, she used Maslow’s Hierarchy of Needs as a framework to ensure children received food, clean water, proper healthcare, vaccinations, education, and emotional support.

In 2009, Boudreaux hired as the foundation's COO high-tech entrepreneur Elizabeth Davis, who questioned why the foundation was building new orphanages when it could partner with existing ones. Inspired by the UN Convention on the Rights of the Child, they developed a set of child rights and used them as benchmarks to create measurable standards for orphanage care. The foundation supports the partner orphanages with resources like accounting tools and training, room, and board for Indian women who serve as house mothers. A key goal was reducing the child-to-caregiver ratio while fostering a family-like environment by grouping mixed-age boys and girls with one house mother.

As of 2017, the Miracle Foundation supported 25 orphanages in India and other parts of the developing world, and partnered with 169 organizations serving over 7,500 children. Boudreaux said that her NGO’s biggest challenge is reaching enough people, which depends on raising enough money. The foundation launched a Mother's Day campaign on social media in 2017 to encourage people to donate in honor their mother. She notes that demonstrating the measurable impact of donations helps build donor trust and encourages contributions.

== Awards and recognition ==
- Recognized as one of 200 Young Global Leaders at the World Economic Forum in Davos, Switzerland
- Received the Humanitarian Award by the United Nations' Austin chapter in 2017
- Named a Global Visionary by UBS in 2017

== Personal life ==
Boudreaux is married and lives in New York City.
