= Graham Cluley =

British security blogger (born 1969)

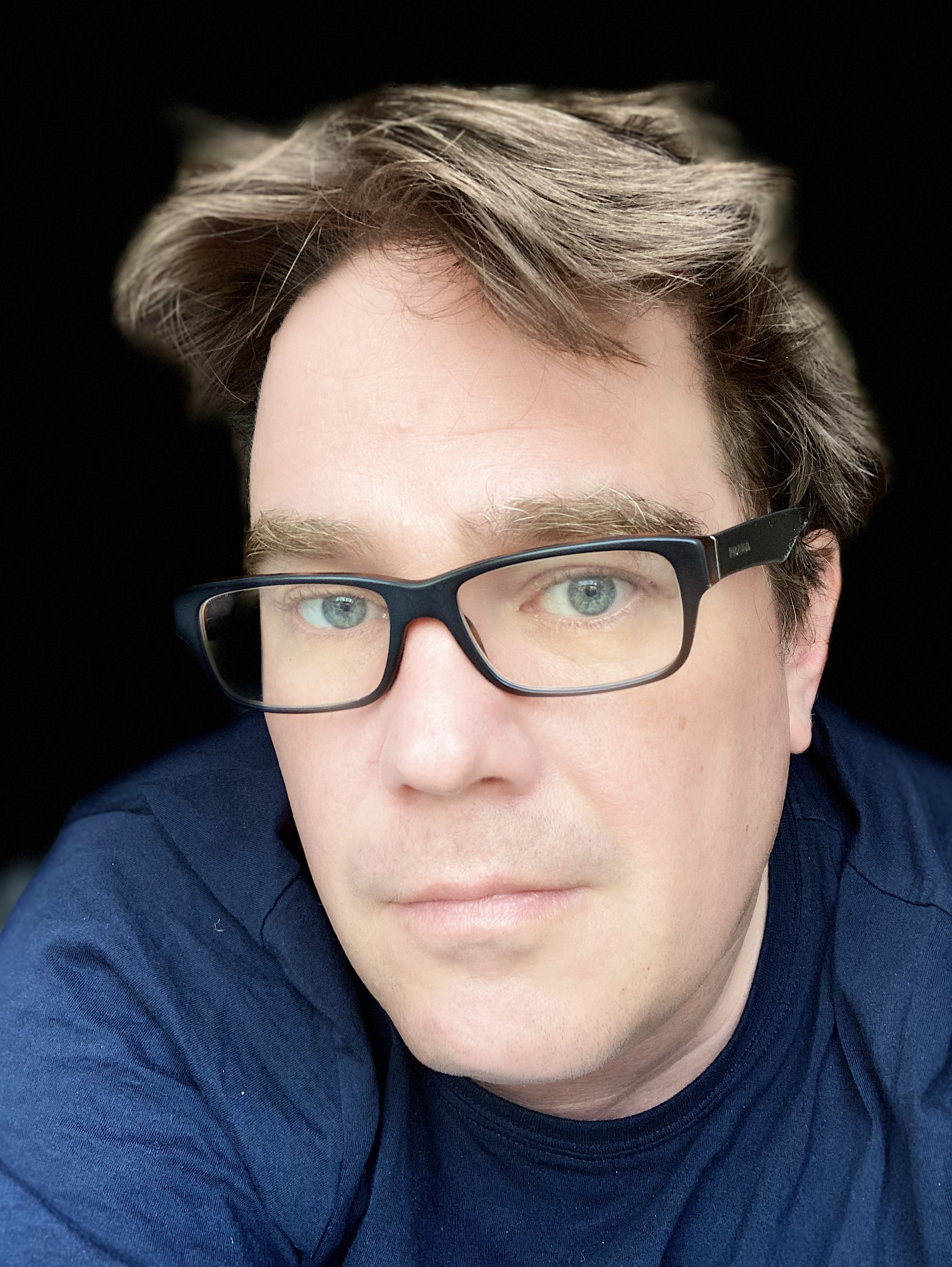
- Occupations: Technology consultant, security blogger, author
- Website: grahamcluley.com

Graham Cluley (born 8 April 1969) is a British security blogger and the author of grahamcluley.com, a daily blog on the latest computer security news, opinion, and advice.

Cluley started his career in the computer security industry as a programmer at British anti-virus firm S&S International (later known as Dr Solomon's Software), where he wrote the first Windows version of Dr Solomon's Anti-Virus Toolkit.

From 1999 to 2013, Cluley was a Senior Technology Consultant at Sophos and also acted as the Head of Corporate Communications, spokesperson and editor of Sophos's Naked Security site.

In 2009 and 2010, Computer Weekly named Cluley Twitter user of the year.

In April 2011, Cluley was inducted into the InfoSecurity Europe Hall of Fame.

Graham Cluley and Carole Theriault are the co-hosts of the weekly Smashing Security podcast.

His war of words with the virus-writer 'Gigabyte' generated an amount of media attention in its own right.

== Public speaking ==
Cluley has given talks about computer security for some of the world's largest companies, worked with law enforcement agencies on investigations into hacking groups, and regularly appears on TV and radio explaining computer security threats.

== Computer games ==
Before entering the computer security industry, Cluley achieved notoriety for two interactive fiction PC games: Jacaranda Jim (1987) and Humbug (1990). Both games were independently distributed as shareware, with Cluley advertising in computer magazines and sending them out on 3½ and 5¼-inch disks. As an incentive, tips and maps were sent out to players who had sent in their registration fees. Both were praised as "shareware masterpieces" in PC Review. Cluley later entered his games into the public domain, and they are now available for download or in-browser play from his website.

=== Jacaranda Jim ===
Cluley wrote Jacaranda Jim while studying computing at Guildford College of Technology. He began developing the game in 1987, borrowing liberally from an earlier unreleased game named Herbie. The game "took about 6 months to write, and was finished by April 1988". The game, which was written in Pascal, was then ported to the PC platform with the help of Alex Bull, another student at Guildford. The premise of the game, as presented in promotional materials, is:

Following an attack on his cargo-ship by a crack squad of homicidal beechwood armchairs, space cadet Jacaranda Jim is forced to crashland into the strange world of Ibberspleen IV. "Luckily", Jim is rescued from the burning wreckage by the mysteriously smug creature, Alan the Gribbley. Can you help Jim escape back to the safety of Earth?

In its original incarnation, the game was named Derek the Troll in honour of its central character, based upon one of Cluley's lecturers. When Cluley's maths lecturer questioned the lampooning of one her colleagues, the character was renamed "Alan the Gribbley" – inspired by one of Cluley's fellow students, "a failed accountant with vaguely homicidal tendencies" – and the game itself rechristened Jacaranda Jim.

Jacaranda Jim was well-reviewed, with Sue Medley writing in computer gaming magazine Zero that "Jacaranda Jim is well worth trying and will certainly give you some sleepless nights before you solve it!"

A sequel called The Case of Spindle's Crotchet was planned and partially completed, but never released. Some of the content from this game, including "a lot of ideas and jokes," were included in Cluley's next game, Humbug.

=== Humbug ===
Humbug is Cluley's second and final text adventure computer game, first distributed as shareware with the February 1991 issue of PC Plus. In a 1992 interview in SynTax magazine, Cluley estimated that the game "took about a year to write." The premise of this game, as presented in promotional materials, is:

You, Sidney Widdershins, are sent to your Grandad's for the Christmas holidays. Lurking in the shadows is Grandad's evil neighbour – Jasper Slake. Jasper, a particularly sadistic dentist, is after Grandad's crumbling manor.

While maintaining the playful tone of its predecessor, Humbug is considerably more difficult than Jacaranda Jim, with one contemporary reviewer noting that it "is not, perhaps, an adventure for novices". A quite extensive review of Humbug was written in 2018 by Joe Pranevich on The Adventure Gamer. Pranevich noted that the game has "more charm than it has any right to have," but that "it's also quite difficult".

=== Later games ===
Cluley went on to produce two graphical games: a Tetris clone called Blox (1990) and a Pacman-based game called Wibbling Wilf (1991). As of 2009, Blox was on display in the computer museum at Bletchley Park.
