= Countdown to Doom =

1982 video game

- Acorn Electron Cover art
- Developer: Peter Killworth
- Publishers: Acornsoft; Topologika
- Platforms: Acorn Electron, BBC Micro, Amstrad CPC, Amstrad PCW, Atari ST, RISC OS, RM Nimbus, IBM PC, ZX Spectrum
- Release: 1982
- Genre: Interactive fiction
- Mode: Single-player

Countdown to Doom is a text adventure game written by Peter Killworth for the BBC Micro and published by Acornsoft in 1982. It is set on the planet Doomawangara, which is coyly shortened to "Doom". An Acorn Electron version was released in 1984 but only as a ROM cartridge for the Plus 1 expansion. This was the only game released exclusively as a ROM cart for the Electron. There are two sequels, both published by Topologika: Return to Doom and Last Days of Doom.

Topologika rereleased Countdown to Doom in 1987, expanding the scope of the game by about 50%. It was published for the BBC Micro, Acorn Electron, ZX Spectrum, IBM PC compatibles, Amstrad CPC, Amstrad PCW, Atari ST, and RM Nimbus. A RISC OS version was published in a compilation with Return to Doom and Philosopher's Quest.

== Plot ==
The player's spaceship crash-lands on Doom's inhospitable surface and they emerge from the wreckage to realise that, unless they can locate the necessary spare parts, their ship will corrode away in a mere 400 time units.
