= Isabelle Chalendar =

French mathematician

Isabelle Chalendar is a French mathematician whose research interests include functional analysis, complex analysis, operator theory, and the theory of semigroups. She is a professor of mathematics and head of the mathematics department at Gustave Eiffel University, a member of the university's Laboratoire d'analyse et de mathématiques appliquées (LAMA), and also holds affiliations with Université Paris Est Marne-la-Vallée (UPEM), Paris-East Créteil University (UPEC), and the French National Centre for Scientific Research (CNRS).

== Education and career ==
Chalendar received her Ph.D. in 1996 from the University of Bordeaux 1, with the dissertation Autour du probleme du sous-espace invariant et theorie des algebres duales on the invariant subspace problem supervised by Bernard Gustave Chevreau.

She was maître de conférences at the Camille Jordan Institute of Claude Bernard University Lyon 1, before moving to her present position at Gustave Eiffel University. She was named the department's gender equality officer in 2016, and head of the department in 2022.

== Selected publications ==
Chalendar is coauthor of the book Modern Approaches to the Invariant-Subspace Problem (with Jonathan Partington, Cambridge University Press, 2011).

Her work with Partington on phase retrieval, in their paper "Phase retrieval on circles and lines" (Canadian Mathematical Bulletin, 2024) was given the 2025 G. de B. Robinson Award of the Canadian Mathematical Society.
