= Jigsaw (video game) =

1995 interactive fiction computer game

- Jigsaw (online version) (Note: "Jigsaw"an online version of the game which can be played in a web browser)
- Developer: Graham Nelson
- Publisher: Self published
- Designer: Graham Nelson
- Programmer: Graham Nelson
- Engine: Z-machine
- Platforms: Z-machine for PCs, plus later browser
- Release: 1995
- Genres: time-travel romance, Interactive Fiction, Adventure
- Mode: Single player

Jigsaw is an interactive fiction (IF) game, (Note: Laurel Halbany. "XYZZYnews Game Reviews: Jigsaw, release 1".) written by Graham Nelson in 1995.

The game begins on New Year's Eve of 1999, with the player discovering a time machine enabling them to travel throughout the twentieth century (including voyage of the Titanic, discovery of penicillin, codebreaking of the enigma machine during World War II, opening of the Suez Canal, and the recording of Abbey Road) to ensure history unfolds 'correctly' despite the activities of 'Black', a character who starts out as an antagonist but becomes the player's love interest. 'Black' has no explicitly stated gender, allowing players to choose that for themselves.

Jigsaw contains references to other interactive fiction games, including Trinity. Features of the game include attention to detail, and a romantic relationship between the player's character and another central character whose gender is never revealed (allowing the player to project the gender of their choice onto both).

Jigsaw has been described as "acclaimed," "epic...notable," and as "[perhaps] one of the most fun educational games in existence". The gameplay is challenging.

== See also ==
- Carmen Sandiego (1985+ educational videogame series)
- Trinity (video game) (1986 game by Infocom that is referenced in Jigsaw)
- Curses (video game) (1993 game by Nelson which has some linkage to Jigsaw)
- Forrest Gump (1994 movie where the protagonist appears at the scene of many major historical events)
