= Spy Snatcher =

1988 video game

- Developers: Jonathan Partington; Jon Thackray
- Publisher: Topologika
- Platforms: Acorn Electron, BBC Micro, Amstrad CPC, Amstrad PCW, Atari ST, RISC OS, Nimbus, IBM PC, ZX Spectrum
- Release: 1988
- Genre: Interactive fiction
- Mode: Single-player

Spy Snatcher is a floppy disk-based text adventure released by Topologika Software in 1988. It was the last professional text adventure to be released on the BBC Micro and Acorn Electron. It was also released for ZX Spectrum (+3 disk only), RISC OS, PC, Amstrad CPC, Amstrad PCW, Atari ST and Nimbus.

== Plot ==
The secret plans for the Sonic Macrothrodule have been leaked to foreign powers by a mole. The player plays as an agent of MI7 and has only an hour to solve the puzzle and reveal the mole.
