= Magic Mushrooms (video game) =

1985 video game

- Developers: Richard Clay; Tim Dobson; Neil Raine
- Publisher: Acornsoft
- Platforms: BBC Micro, Acorn Electron
- Release: 1985
- Genre: Platform
- Mode: Single-player

Magic Mushrooms is a platform game published in 1985 by Acornsoft for the Acorn Electron and BBC Micro home computers. It includes a built-in level editor.

== Gameplay ==
The objective is to guide Murphy, a beer-bellied man with a large nose, and remove all the magic mushrooms that populate the levels.

The screen has a series of green bricks on a black background. To move, the player can use the left, right and jump buttons, as well as climb ladders. Once Murphy has gathered all the mushrooms, the player must use the level's exit platform before time runs out.

There are some obstacles in the player's route: wobbly platforms which make Murphy less stable on his feet, conveyor belts which can send the character backwards or slow them, ice platforms which make Murphy slide in one direction until he reaches the end of it, glass which disintegrates under his feet, and finally some enemies that look like mutant tomatoes.
