= G. Lawrence Blankinship Sr. =

American businessman

- Born: September 8, 1913; Lake Charles, Louisiana
- Died: December 28, 2005 (aged 92)
- Occupations: Pharmacist, business owner
- Years active: 1944–2005
- Known for: Blankinship Distributors

G. Lawrence Blankinship Sr. (1913–2005) was an African-American businessman and civic leader from Kansas City. He served as the chairman of the Kansas City Black Economic Union for more than 14 years.

== Life ==
Blankinship was born on September 8, 1913, in Lake Charles, Louisiana, to Mattie G. Blankinship and Lee Blankinship and was the youngest of three children and the only son. He moved to Kansas City in his teens and graduated from Lincoln High School. He later attended Kansas City College of Pharmacy and was told by an instructor that several white students in his class objected to his presence because he was black.

He married Opal C. Blankinship in 1953 and they had two children, Adrian and G. Lawrence Blankinship Jr.

Blankinship died on December 28, 2005, at age 92.

== Career ==
In April 1944, he founded Blankinship & Meyers Jobbers together with Fred Meyers, a fellow manager within the Crown Drug Store chain. The company was a wholesale supplier of African American beauty products.

In 1947, Meyers decided to leave the newly formed company for personal health reasons, and the company became Blankinship Distributors Inc. Blankinship went on to supply hundreds of sales outlets, primarily drugstores, with hair care and cosmetic products developed for the burgeoning African American markets.
