= Curses (video game) =

- Curses being played in a modern interpreter.
- Developer: Graham Nelson
- Publisher: Self published
- Designer: Graham Nelson
- Engine: Z-machine
- Platform: Z-machine
- Release: 1993
- Genres: Interactive Fiction, Adventure
- Mode: Single player

Curses is an interactive fiction computer game created by Graham Nelson in 1993. Appearing in the beginning of the non-commercial era of interactive fiction, it is considered one of the milestones of the genre.

Writing for The New York Times, Edward Rothstein described the game as "acclaimed."

== Plot ==
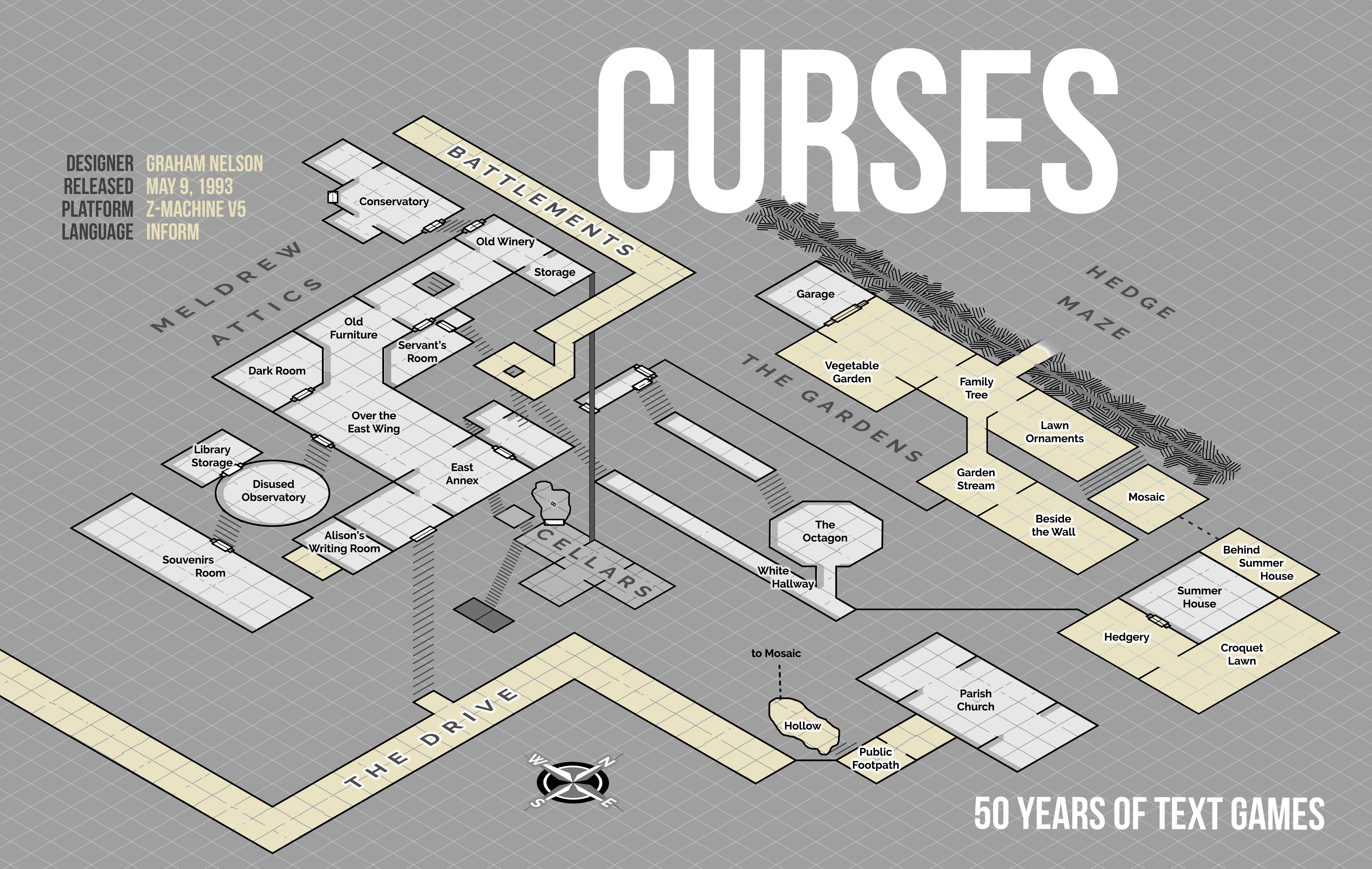
A map of Curses world by Aaron A. Reed from 50 Years of Text Games project

The player plays the part of the current owner of Meldrew Hall. In the course of searching the attic for an old tourist map of Paris, the protagonist steps into a surreal adventure to uncover a centuries-old curse that has been placed on the Meldrew family. The goal of the game is to find the missing map, and thus annul the curse.

== Development ==
Curses was originally developed on an Acorn Archimedes using Acorn C/C++, before Nelson moved to his Inform programming language, which was simultaneously released. It was the first non-test game developed in the language. It is distributed without charge as a Z-Code executable. The Inform source code is not publicly available.

== Innovations ==
Curses contains some innovations that contribute to its appeal.

- Managing the player's inventory by automatically placing items in a container to make room for an object needed in hand (such as placing an item in the rucksack when reading an entry in a book), eliminating the tedium of having to manually drop one item before picking up another.
- Commands places and objects, displaying all the locations visited and all the objects seen during the game.

== See also ==
- Jigsaw, another Graham Nelson game, from 1995
