= Dunnet (video game) =

1982 video game

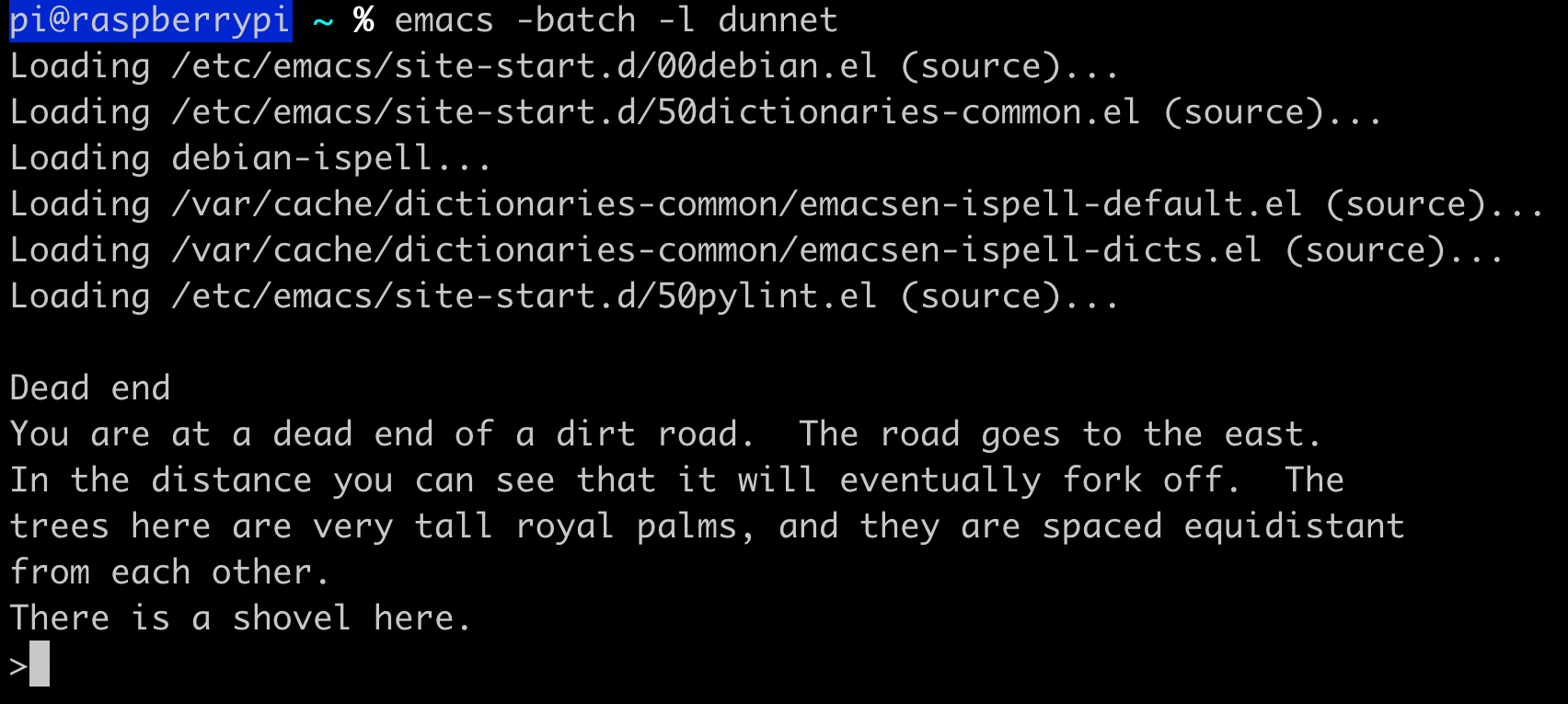
- The first scene of Dunnet
- Developer: Ron Schnell
- Release: 1982; 43 years ago
- Genre: Text adventure

Dunnet is a surreal, cyberpunk text adventure written by Ron Schnell, based on a game he wrote in 1982. The name is derived from the first three letters of dungeon and the last three letters of ARPANET. It was first written in Maclisp for the DECSYSTEM-20, then ported to Emacs Lisp in 1992. Since 1994 the game has shipped with GNU Emacs; it also has been included with XEmacs.

The game has been recommended to writers considering writing interactive fiction.

== Plot ==
The game starts out with the player standing at the end of a dirt road, but it turns to the surreal when players realize that they are actually walking around inside a Unix system, and teleporting themselves around the Arpanet. There are many subtle jokes in this game, and there are multiple ways of ending the game. Throughout the game the player moves through different areas and rooms trying to collect treasure to earn points.

== Legacy ==
Dunnet is playable on any operating system with the Emacs editor. Emacs comes with most Unices, including macOS (prior to version 10.15 Catalina) and distributions of Linux. Several articles targeted to Mac OS X owners have recommended it as an easter egg as a game that can be run in Terminal.app. It can be run by running emacs -batch -l dunnet in a shell or the key sequence M-x dunnet within Emacs, the former being the preferred and official way to run it. Dunnet was used as a benchmark in the effort to port Emacs Lisp to Guile, progressing from running standalone games to running the entire Emacs system in less than a person-year of work.
