= Acornsoft =

Former software division of Acorn Computers

- Type: Privately held company
- Industry: Software industry
- Founded: 1980; 46 years ago
- Founders: David Johnson-Davies; Hermann Hauser; Chris Curry
- Defunct: 2013; 13 years ago
- Headquarters: Cambridge, England
- Key people: David Johnson-Davies; Tim Dobson; Chris Jordan
- Products: Application software; Educational software; Video games
- Owner: Acorn Computers
- Parent: Acorn Network Computer
- Website: www.acornsoft.com

Acornsoft was the software arm of Acorn Computers, and a major publisher of software for the BBC Micro and Acorn Electron. As well as games, it also produced a large number of educational titles, extra computer languages and business and utility packages – these included word processor VIEW and the spreadsheet ViewSheet supplied on ROM and cartridge for the BBC Micro/Acorn Electron and included as standard in the BBC Master and Acorn Business Computer.

== History ==
Acornsoft was formed in late 1980 by Acorn Computers directors Hermann Hauser and Chris Curry, and David Johnson-Davies, author of the first game for a UK personal computer and of the official Acorn Atom manual "Atomic Theory and Practice". David Johnson-Davies was managing director and in early 1981 was joined by Tim Dobson, Programmer and Chris Jordan, Publications Editor.

While some of their games were clones or remakes of popular arcade games (e.g. Hopper is a clone of Sega's Frogger, Snapper is Namco's Pac-Man, Arcadians is Namco's Galaxian), they also published a number of original titles such as Aviator, Elite, and Revs. Acornsoft also published text adventures by authors such as Peter Killworth, including Philosopher's Quest (previously titled Brand X) and Countdown to Doom.

As a result of the publication of a method to circumvent copy protection measures employed by Acornsoft titles, a High Court injunction against Computing Publications - publisher of Personal Computer World - was granted to Acorn Computers "requiring all copies of the January 1984 issue of PCW to be withdrawn from sale", with the article concerned being regarded as inciting readers to "duplicate computer programs". This injunction was subsequently lifted as a consequence of an out-of-court settlement between the parties involving a damages payment of £65,000 plus costs to Acorn "to meet Acorn's expenses in developing a new locking device". The article's author, Guy Kewney, and the magazine's editor, Jane Bird, argued that printing a software routine showing how to save Acornsoft cassette software to disk was a service to the magazine's readers. The cost of printing the magazine issue concerned was estimated at £100,000.

Acornsoft became a subsidiary within Acorn Computer Group, distinct from Acorn Computers who were responsible for the development of Acorn's microcomputer systems, but Acornsoft ceased to operate as a separate company upon the departure of David Johnson-Davies in January 1986. Past this date, Acorn Computers used the Acornsoft name on office software it released in the VIEW family for the BBC Master series. In 1986 Superior Software was granted a licence to publish some Acornsoft games and re-released many, individually and as compilations such as the Play It Again Sam and Acornsoft Hits series. By agreement, the Acornsoft name was also used on the packaging of some of the subsequent Superior games. Superior chose not to take on Acornsoft's text adventure games, most of which were released in updated versions by Topologika along with some sequels from the same authors.

In 1997, Acorn sought to revive the Acornsoft brand for new software releases, such as upgrades to RISC OS, programming tools, a new Web browser, multitasking movie playback (using Acorn Replay), and Java for RISC OS. A stated objective was to demonstrate that a "wide range of innovative software at competitive prices" was available for RISC OS, with support also being potentially offered to third-party software producers. Acornsoft products themselves would be supported by marketing, including advertising, and the provision of press review samples.

== Branding ==
Loading screen for LISP

Acornsoft titles extended their consistent branding to the software's loading screens.

== Select titles ==
- Acheton – A text adventure
- Arcadians – A Galaxian clone
- Aviator – A Spitfire flight simulator. With aliens...
- Black Box & Gambit - 2 board game type games which were the winning entries of a 'design a game' competition on ITV's The Saturday Show. Black Box was a licensed version of the Waddingtons game of the same name developed by Ben Finn who would go on to co-write Sibelius. Gambit was created by the Oliver Twins and their first commercially released game
- Bouncer – A Q*bert clone
- Business Games – An educational package
- Carousel – A Carnival clone
- Castle of Riddles – A text adventure
- Countdown to Doom – A text adventure; first in a trilogy (although sequels Return to Doom and Last Days of Doom were not published by Acornsoft)
- Crazy Tracer – An Amidar clone
- Creative Graphics – A series of graphical demonstrations of the BBC Micro's visual capabilities, with user editable code
- Drogna – Strategy game based on a section of the BBC TV game show The Adventure Game
- Elite – A 3D space battle and trading game
- Firebug – A platform and ladders game
- Free Fall – Survival game set in an out of control space station
- Gateway to Karos – A text adventure
- Graphs and Charts – Graphical mathematical modelling
- Hopper – A Frogger clone
- JCB Digger – A scrolling 2D dig-em-up
- Kingdom of Hamil – A text adventure
- Labyrinth – A 2D maze based shoot-em-up
- Magic Mushrooms – A platform and ladders game with built-in level editor
- Meteor Mission – A Lunar Rescue clone
- Meteors – An Asteroids clone
- Missile Base – A Missile Command clone
- Monsters – A Space Panic clone
- Philosopher's Quest – A text adventure
- Planetoid – A Defender clone originally released as Defender
- Revs – A Formula Three racing car simulation
- Rocket Raid – A Scramble clone
- Snapper – A Pac-Man clone
- Sphinx Adventure – A text adventure
- Starship Command – A 2D space battle game
- Super Invaders – A Space Invaders clone
- Volcano – A game in which you rescue people from the other side of an active volcano with a helicopter

== Acornsoft Games range ==
Including all arcade, text adventure and board games. All games were compatible with the BBC Micro Model B. Games followed by Model A & B were compatible with both machines. Games followed by Electron were also released separately for the Acorn Electron. Games are listed by their catalogue numbers which are roughly the order of release of the BBC versions.

- G01 Philosopher's Quest (BBC 1982, Electron 1984)
- G02 Defender (BBC 1982) deleted for legal reasons and later re-released as Planetoid
- G02 Aviator (BBC 1983) released with G26-G28 but re-used the deleted Defender's number
- G03 Monsters (BBC 1982, Electron 1983)
- G04 Snapper (BBC 1982, Electron 1983)
- G05 Rocket Raid (BBC 1982)
- G06 Arcade Action (BBC Model A & B 1982) 4 games: Invaders, Breakout, Dodgems and Snake
- G07 Sphinx Adventure (BBC 1982, Electron 1984)
- G08 Cube Master (BBC 1982)
- G09 JCB Digger (BBC 1983)
- G10 Chess (BBC 1982, Electron 1983)
- G11 Maze (BBC 1982, Electron 1984)
- G12 Sliding-Block Puzzles (BBC 1982)
- G13 Meteors (BBC 1982, Electron 1983)
- G14 Arcadians (BBC 1982, Electron 1984)
- G15 Planetoid (BBC 1982, Electron 1984)
- G16 Super Invaders (BBC 1982)
- G17 Castle of Riddles (BBC 1982, Electron 1984)
- G18 Missile Base (BBC 1982)
- G19 Countdown to Doom (BBC 1982, Electron ROM Cartridge 1984)
- G20 Draughts & Reversi (BBC Model A & B 1983, Electron 1983)
- G21 Snooker (BBC 1983, Electron 1984)
- G22 Starship Command (BBC 1983, Electron 1983)
- G23 Hopper (BBC 1983, Electron 1984)
- G24 Carousel (BBC 1983)
- G25 Kingdom of Hamil (BBC 1983)
- G26 Crazy Tracer (BBC 1983, Electron 1984)
- G27 Drogna (BBC 1983)
- G28 Free Fall (BBC 1983, Electron 1984)
- G29 Meteor Mission (BBC 1984)
- G30 Gateway to Karos (BBC 1983)
- G31 Boxer (BBC 1984, Electron 1984)
- G32 Tetrapod (BBC 1984)
- G33 Volcano (BBC 1984)
- G34 Black Box & Gambit (BBC 1984)
- G35 Bouncer (BBC 1984)
- G36 The Seventh Star (BBC 1984)
- G37 Acheton (BBC 1984)
- G38 Elite (BBC 1984, Electron 1984)
- G39 Firebug (BBC 1984, Electron 1984)
- G40 Quondam (BBC 1984)
- G41 Labyrinth (BBC 1984)
- G42 Go (BBC 1984, Electron 1984)
- G43 Revs (BBC 1985)
- G44 Revs 4 Tracks (BBC 1985) extra tracks for the main game
- G45 Elite original BBC Micro 6502 Second Processor version
- G46 Magic Mushrooms (BBC 1985, Electron 1985)
- G47 Elite enhanced (BBC 1986) incl. 6502 Second Processor and Master 128 versions

There are also a number of completed but unreleased games that have found their way into the public domain such as Crazy Balloon, Hellforce and Bandit that date from around 1983.

== Acornsoft Education range ==
Acornsoft produced a wide range of educational titles aimed at many different age groups.

- E01 Algebraic Manipulation (BBC Model A & B 198?)
- E02 Peeko-Computer (BBC Model A & B 198?, Electron 1984)
- E03 Business Games (BBC Model A & B 198?, Electron 1984) 2 games: Stokmark and Telemark
- E04 Tree of Knowledge (BBC 198?, Electron 1983)
- E05 Word Hunt (BBC 198?, Electron 1984)
- E06 Word Sequencing (BBC Model A & B 198?, Electron 1984)
- E07 Sentence Sequencing (BBC 198?, Electron 1984)
- E08 Number Balance (BBC 198?, Electron 1984)
- E09 Missing Signs (BBC Model A & B 198?, Electron 1984)
- E?? Speed and Light (BBC 198?)
- E?? Density and Circuit (BBC 198?)
- E12 Chemical Analysis (BBC 198?)
- E13 Chemical Simulations (BBC 198?)
- E14 Chemical Structures (BBC 198?)
- E15 Jars (BBC 198?)
- E16 Temperature Control Simulation (BBC 1983)
- E17 The Examiner (BBC 198?)
- E18 Spooky Manor (BBC 198?)
- E19
- E20
- E21
- E22 Talkback (BBC 1984, Electron 1984)
- E23 Workshop (BBC 1984, Electron 1984)
- E24 ABC (BBC 1984)

Acornsoft also published and distributed a range of educational software developed by ASK (Applied Systems Knowledge) that were widely used in schools running BBC Micros. These included Podd (find out which actions a red blobby character can perform (e.g. jump, smile, dance), Squeeze (a two player strategy game of squeezing shapes onto a board) and Cranky (solve maths problems to repair a living calculator). These titles were part of the Acornsoft catalogue but used a different code (XBE?? – all other Acornsoft titles began with S so the Education range on BBC Micro cassettes would be SBE??). They ran on both the BBC Micro Model B and Acorn Electron.

The Ivan Berg Software range was also mainly educational but had its own distinct code (XBX??). This included the 6 Grandmaster Quizzes (Theatre, Crime & Detection, Music, History, Science Fiction and Royal), relationship aids "..I Do" Your Guide to a Happy Marriage and The Dating Game and GCE/CSE revision guides (Mathematics, Biology and English).

Acornsoft also distributed other ranges of educational programs developed by companies such as ICL, Good Housekeeping and Bourne but they are not considered part of the official catalogue.

== Acornsoft Business range ==
Acornsoft produced a range of office software for home and business use.

- B01 Desk Diary (BBC 198?, Electron 1984)
- B02 Forecast (BBC 198?)
- B03 VIEW (BBC 198?, Electron ROM cartridge 1984)
- B04 VIEW Printer Drivers (BBC 198?)
- B05 Personal Money Management (BBC 198?, Electron 1983)
- B06 Database (BBC 1983, Electron 1984)
- B07 ViewSheet (BBC 1984, Electron ROM cartridge 1984)
- B08 Invoicing (BBC 1984)
- B09 Mailing (BBC 1984)
- B10 Accounts Receivable (BBC 1984)
- B11 Stock Control (BBC 1984)
- B12 Order Processing (BBC 1984)
- B13 Accounts Payable (BBC 1984)
- B14 Purchasing (BBC 1984)
- B15 Hi-View (BBC 19??)
- B26 P-System (BBC with 6502 Second Processor)

The series continues but mainly with add-on products for the VIEW word processor such as ViewIndex (an automatic index generator) and ViewSpell (spell-checker) as well as newer versions.

View Professional (1987) was a combined wordprocessor, spreadsheet and database similar to PipeDream on the Z88.

Although primarily a programming language suite, Acornsoft released its P-System product featuring UCSD Pascal and Fortran 77 compilers as part of its business range. Developed by TDI for Acornsoft, the product required a 6502 second processor and disc system, preferably with two drives. Despite the £299 price, various tools including an assembler and linker were omitted from the product, these being made available in a separate Advanced Development Toolkit from TDI.

== Acornsoft Languages range ==
Acorn systems came with a version of the BBC BASIC programming language as standard but Acornsoft also produced a wide range of other languages that could be loaded in by cassette or disc or in some cases, supplied in ROM form.

- L01 FORTH (BBC 1982, Electron 1983)
- L02 LISP (BBC 1982, Electron 1983, Electron ROM cartridge 1984)
- L03 BCPL (BBC 1983)
- L04 Microtext (BBC 1983)
- L05 6502 Development System (BBC 1985)
- L06 Logo (BBC 1983, Electron ROM cartridge 1985)
- L07 Turtle Graphics (BBC 1983, Electron 1984)
- L08 S-Pascal (BBC 1983, Electron 1984)
- L09 LISP Demonstrations (BBC 1984)
- L10 BCPL Calculations Package (BBC 198?)
- L11
- L12 BCPL Stand Alone Generator (BBC 1983)
- L13 FORTH – ROM version (BBC 1984)
- L14 LISP – ROM version (BBC 1982)
- L15
- L16
- L17 PROLOG Micro (BBC 1985)
- L18 ISO-Pascal (BBC 1984, Electron ROM cartridge 1985)
- L19 COMAL (BBC 1984).
- L20
- L21
- L22 BASIC Editor (BBC 1985)
- L23 Termulator (BBC 1987)
- L24 ISO-Pascal Stand Alone Generator (BBC 198?)

The relative performance of some of Acornsoft's languages was evaluated using a benchmark based on the Takeuchi function, Tak by former Acornsoft managing director, David Johnson-Davies, noting that "it is difficult to imagine a language that performs badly on Tak being much use for anything", illustrating a diversity amongst these language implementations in terms of readability, speed and generated code size. A follow-up article expanded the comparison to other language implementations such as Oxford Pascal, Z80 versions of BBC BASIC, Turbo Pascal and Small-C.

== Acornsoft Graphics range and more ==
The graphics range was used to demonstrate the graphical power of the Acorn computers but only three titles were made available. The X?? code was then used for other types of software.

- X01 Creative Graphics (BBC 198?, Electron 1983)
- X02 Graphs & Charts (BBC 198?, Electron 1983)
- X03 Picture Maker (BBC 1983, Electron 1984)
- X04 Shirley Conran's Magic Garden (BBC 1983)
- X05 Collector's Catalogue (BBC 198?)
- X06 Membership Manager (BBC 198?)
- X07 One To Nine (BBC 198?)
- X08 Hooked on Numbers (BBC 1983)
- X09
- X10 Complete Cocktail Maker (BBC 198?, Electron 1984)
- X11 Paul Daniels' Magic Show (BBC 198?, Electron 1984)
- X12 100 Programs for the BBC Micro (BBC 198?)
- X13 Linkword French (BBC 1984)
- X14 Linkword Italian (BBC 1984)
- X15 Linkword Spanish (BBC 1984)
- X16 Linkword German (BBC 1984)
- X17 Watch Your Weight (BBC 198?, Electron 1984)
- X18 Me & My Micro (Electron 1984)

The range took on various themes including Creative Sound (X26).
