= Atlantis PbeM =

Atlantis is a free open-ended multi-player computer moderated fantasy turn-based strategy game for any number of players. It is played via email. The game world is populated by many races and monsters. Players may attempt to carve out huge empires, become master magicians, intrepid explorers, rich traders or any other career that comes to mind and interact with other players in trade, war and alliances. There is no declared winner of the game, players set their own objectives, and one can join at any time.

== History ==
Russell Wallace developed the initial version and ran the first game, Atlantis 1.0 in 1993. Geoff Dunbar continued the legacy, first with the extensive playtest of Atlantis 2.0, and then the commercial game Atlantis 3.0. In 1999 Atlantis 4.0 was created by Geoff Dunbar and released under terms of GNU GPL. "AtlantisDev" Yahoo Group was formed sometime after that and Joseph Traub became the maintainer of the code. Atlantis 4.0 was later expanded on by various contributors from the AtlantisDev group.

Since 2011 development uses Git. Currently several developers contribute to server code on GitHub.

Server version history
Version	Release date	Maintainer	Notes
1.0	Apr 1993	Russell Wallace	Written in C.
1.1	Nov 1993	Jim Cotugno	
2.0	Jan 1995	Geoff Dunbar	Rewritten from scratch in C++ by Geoff Dunbar based on 2.0 rules by Russell Wallace.
3.0	Jun 1996	Geoff Dunbar	
4.0.1	Jan 1999	Geoff Dunbar	First version released under GNU GPL.
4.0.2	Mar 1999	Geoff Dunbar	
4.0.3	Apr 1999	Geoff Dunbar	
4.0.4	Jun 1999	Geoff Dunbar	
4.0.5	Feb 2001	Joseph Traub	Added version control by CVS.
4.0.6	Apr 2001	Joseph Traub	
4.0.7	May 2001	Joseph Traub	
4.0.8	Jul 2001	Joseph Traub	
4.0.9	Nov 2001	Joseph Traub	
4.0.10	Dec 2001	Joseph Traub	
5.0.0	Jul 2002	Joseph Traub	
5.1.0	Jun 2011	Loriaki	Version control moved from CVS to SourceForge SVN.
5.2.0	Jul 2019	Stephen Baillie	Version control moved from SVN to Git at Aug 2011.
5.2.1	Sep 2019	Artem Trytiak	
5.2.2	Sep 2019	Artem Trytiak	
5.2.3	Oct 2019	Artem Trytiak	
5.2.4	Oct 2019	Artem Trytiak	
5.2.5	Dec 2022	Artem Trytiak	

== Software ==
- Atlantis 5 server source code. The project's GitHub repository
- Atlantis Little Helper open source GUI client
- Atlantis Crystal Ball free GUI client
- Atlantis Advisor GUI client
- AtlaClient GUI client

== Running Games ==
- Atlantis New Origins. Recurring game using version 5.2.5 with updates. 3 days / week initially moving to 2 days / week turns after about turn 20. Most recent game (v7) started at 9 Sep 2024.
- Twilight Atlantis (Miskatonic 5). Version 4.2 game with 3 days / week turns.
