= Topologika =

Former British independent educational software publisher

Topologika Software Ltd
- Industry: Software development
- Founded: 1983; 43 years ago in Stilton, Cambridgeshire
- Founder: Brian Kerslake
- Defunct: June 2013
- Headquarters: Brighton, Sussex, United Kingdom
- Website: topologika.co.uk

Topologika Software Ltd was an independent British publisher of educational software. Established in Stilton, Cambridgeshire in 1983, the company spent most of its life in Penryn, Cornwall before moving to Brighton, Sussex. The company was dissolved at the end of June 2013. Its educational software continues to be sold by distributors REM via, and is still supported by Topologika's founder Brian Kerslake. One of the educational software products was Music Box.

Many of its early products were interactive fiction adventure games taken on after Acornsoft was sold to Superior Software who only continued to release their arcade games. Two of its first releases were Countdown to Doom and Philosopher's Quest, written by Peter Killworth. The versions produced by Topologika were large scale improvements upon the originals.

The complete list of adventure games produced by Topologika was as follows:

- Acheton
- Avon
- Countdown to Doom
- Giant Killer
- Hezarin
- Kingdom of Hamil
- Monsters of Murdac
- Philosopher's Quest
- Return to Doom
- Sellardore Tales
- Spy Snatcher
- Stig of the Dump
- The Last Days of Doom

Topologika has itself now ceased publishing interactive fiction other than as an element of its range of educational software which now includes Marshal Anderson's interactive fiction on CD and for VLEs (Sellardore Tales and Stig of the Dump) and Peter Killworth's maths adventure GiantKiller.
