= William Dore =

American businessman and political donor

William "Bill" J. Dore
- Born: July 15, 1942 (age 84); New Iberia, Louisiana
- Education: McNeese State University
- Occupation: Businessman
- Employer: Doré Energy Corporation
- Known for: Political donations

William "Bill" Jude Doré (born 1942) is an American businessman and political donor. He is the former chairman and chief executive officer of Global Industries, Ltd., an offshore construction and subsea services company that he developed into an international marine contractor before its acquisition in 2011. Doré has also been active in philanthropic and political causes, including contributions to federal political campaigns and the establishment of a Louisiana scholarship program through the Horatio Alger Association of Distinguished Americans.

== Personal life and education ==
Doré was born in New Iberia, Louisiana. He is the oldest of five children of Elaine Therese (née Ackal) Doré and Advance ("Eddie") Doré, a second-generation Lebanese immigrant.

Doré attended McNeese State University on a track and field scholarship; he studied Education and earned a bachelor's and master's degrees in 1966.

Doré and his wife Kay split their time between Lake Charles, Louisiana, and Mountain Brook, Alabama.

== Career ==
Doré's career began as an insurance salesman while he was attending college. After college Dore moved to New Orleans, earning real estate and securities licenses.

In 1973, Doré purchased Global Divers & Contractors, Inc., a near-bankrupt rental equipment company with only three employees, and began expanding its operations. Through a series of acquisitions during the 1970s, 1980s, and 1990s, he built the business into Global Industries, Ltd., an offshore construction and subsea services firm operating in the Gulf of Mexico and international markets.

By 2006, Global Industries (traded under symbols GLBL and GQO) employed more than 6,000 people and reported revenues exceeding $1 billion. Doré retired as chief executive in 2006, and as chairman in 2007. In 2011, the French engineering company Technip acquired Global Industries in a transaction valued at more than $1 billion.

He has previously served on the board of Founders Advisors, a Birmingham, Alabama based merger, acquisition & strategic advisory firm.

== Political activities ==
Doré was a major supporter of Rick Santorum's 2012 presidential campaign, donating $2.25 million to the Red, White and Blue Fund, Santorum's Super PAC. Dore has given money to both Democrats and Republicans, supporting Bobby Jindal, Charles Boustany, and Mary Landrieu.

== Philanthropy ==
Doré established the Horatio Alger Louisiana Scholarship Program through the Horatio Alger Association of Distinguished Americans and has donated more than $7 million for Louisiana scholarships. The Horatio Alger Association of Distinguished Americans awarded him the Horatio Alger Award in 2000.
