= Graham Nelson =

British mathematician, programmer and writer of interactive fiction (born 1968)

- Born: 1968 (age 56–57)
- Occupation(s): Mathematician, poet, game designer
- Spouse: Emily Short

Graham A. Nelson (born 1968) is a British mathematician, poet, and the creator of the Inform design system for creating interactive fiction (IF) games. He has authored several IF games, including Curses (1993) and Jigsaw (1995).

== Education ==
In 1994, Nelson received a Ph.D. in mathematics from the University of Oxford under the supervision of Simon Donaldson.

== Writing ==
Nelson co-edited Oxford Poetry and in 1997 received an Eric Gregory Award from the Society of Authors for his poetry. As of 2004 he was managing editor of Legenda, the imprint of the Modern Humanities Research Association (MHRA).

== Interactive fiction ==
Nelson is the creator of the Inform design system for creating interactive fiction (IF) games. He has also authored several IF games, including Curses (1993) and Jigsaw (1995), using the experience of writing Curses in particular to expand the range of verbs that Inform is capable of understanding.

== Personal life ==
Nelson is married to IF writer Emily Short.

== Games ==
=== Written ===
- Curses (1993, Z-code)
- Deja Vu (1993, Z-code)
- Balances (1994, Z-code)
- Jigsaw (1995, Z-code)
- The Meteor, the Stone and a Long Glass of Sherbet (as "Angela M. Horns", 1996, Z-code), for IF Comp 1996 (1st place). Was a finalist for Best Individual Puzzle, Best Puzzles, Best Writing, and Best Game at the XYZZY Awards 1996
- The Tempest (1997, Z-code), for IF Comp 1997 (25th place). Winner of Best Use of Medium at the XYZZY Awards 1997.
- Time and Dwarves (1998, Inform source code). Demo code for Inform programmers.
- Ruins (as "Angela M. Horns", 2001)
- The Reliques of Tolti-Aph (2006, Z-code)

=== Ported ===
- Adventure
- Adventureland
- Crobe
- Fyleet
- Quest for the Sangraal

== Other works ==
- (1995) "The Craft of the Adventure" (2nd ed)
- (1997) Singularities, with Polly Clark and Tim Kendall. Oxford: Hubble Press. ISBN 0-9531989-0-1. Anthology of poetry
- (2001) Inform Designers Manual (4th ed), with Gareth Rees. Placet Solutions, ISBN 0-9713119-0-0
