= Cultist Simulator =

2018 video game

- Developer: Weather Factory
- Publisher: Humble Bundle (Note: Published for iOS, Android, and Nintendo Switch by Playdigious)
- Engine: Unity
- Platforms: Linux; macOS; Windows; Android; iOS; Switch
- Release: Linux, macOS, Windows; 31 May 2018; Android, iOS; 2 April 2019; Nintendo Switch; 2 February 2021
- Genre: Simulation
- Mode: Single-player

Cultist Simulator is a card-based simulation video game developed by indie studio Weather Factory and published by Humble Bundle. It was released for Windows, macOS and Linux computer systems in May 2018, with mobile versions published by Playdigious and released in April 2019. A port for Nintendo Switch was released in February 2021.

In a 1920s Lovecraftian horror setting, the player amasses and expends human and nonhuman followers alongside occult texts and tools, in discovering and then pursuing any of a number of wildly differing paths to immortality, while carefully avoiding deaths arising from starvation, despair, madness, or the attention of powerful adversaries. The game is experienced through an array of playing cards moved about on a tabletop, with cards occasionally pulled from a map representing a transcendent reality accessible in dreams.

Success requires partial familiarization with an intricate "Secret Histories" mythology invented for this game and for connected Weather Factory projects Book of Hours and tabletop RPG "The Lady Afterwards." Reviewers praised the game's writing, while others criticized its pacing.

== Gameplay ==
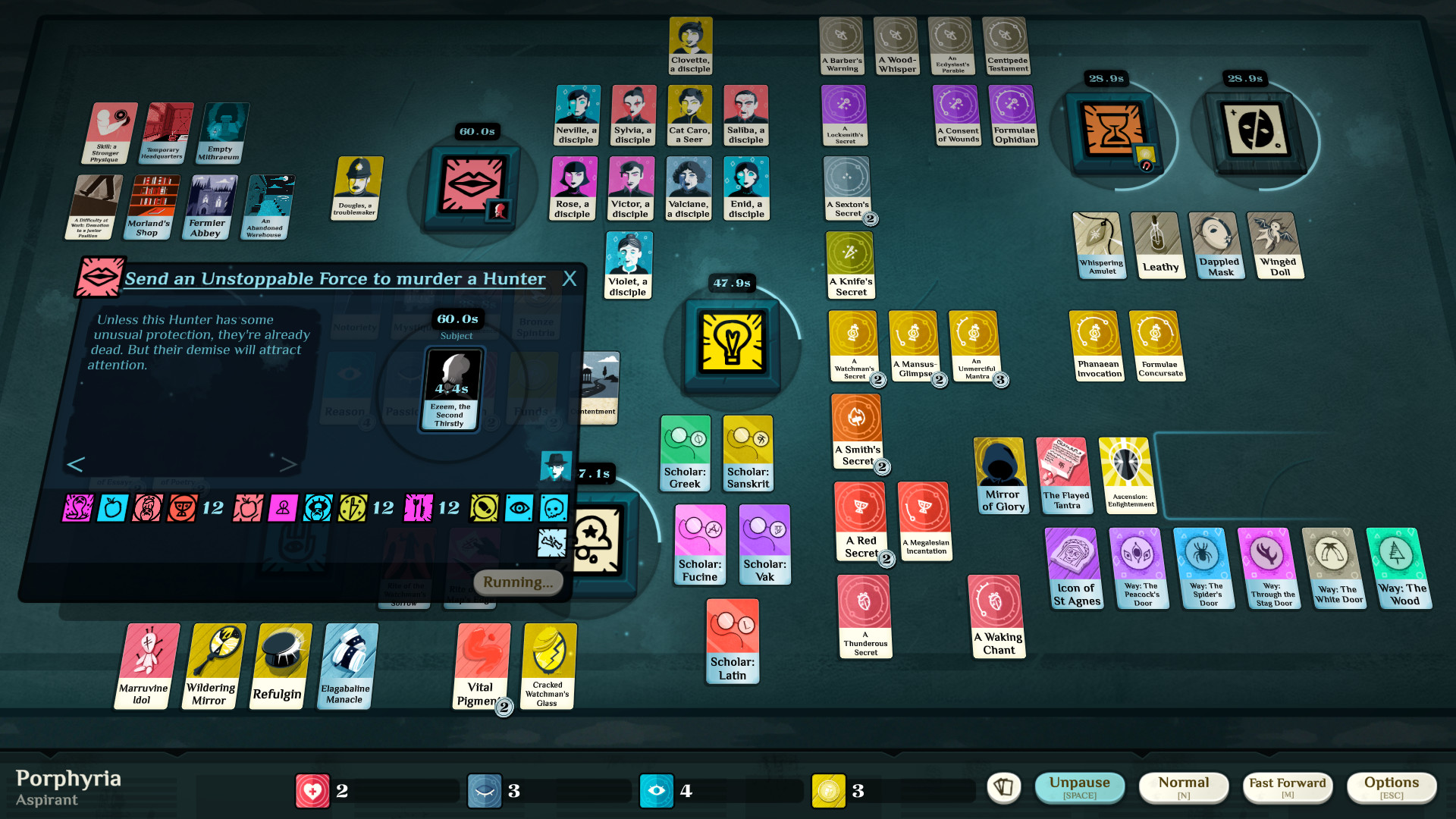
Screenshot towards the latter stages of the game

Cultist Simulator is a narrative-driven simulation game that has the player take on the role of a citizen in one of several 1920s European capitals, chiefly one resembling London. The player's actions may lead to their creating an illegal cult in pursuit of semi-divinity for themselves or others. The game's mechanics are presented as a combination of playing cards and timed "verb" boxes/action buttons in which the cards are placed. Cards can represent human and nonhuman NPCs, player character attributes such as health, passion or reason, language proficiencies, occult books and scraps of lore, rituals, day jobs, occult influences obtained from dream, obsessions, cities, excavation sites, magical tools and ingredients, currencies, etc. Player choices involve combining these cards within different "verb" boxes with varying, complex outputs. The player drops cards into verbs which may respond by demanding more cards if not directly pulling them from the table, both before and after the player commits the inserted cards starting a timer for when output cards can be collected. The initial, default "Aspirant" character begins with only a "Work" verb and two cards: a menial job and the health needed to work one shift of it. After the timer the player collects a temporarily exhausted Health card, the job, and cards representing some funds.

As the game progresses, new action buttons can appear. Some of these are beneficial, adding more options that players can do, such as Study, Talk, Explore, or Dream. Other action buttons are a detriment to the player's progress. For example, players will eventually get an action button that reflects the passage of their character's time in the game, which will automatically consume wealth cards; should the player have no wealth cards when this action's timer completes, they will gain Hunger cards, which leads to a chain of cards and action buttons that can lead to the death of the character. Some cards, often generated by action buttons, also have timers attached, either which they will burn out, or may revert to a different card type. The game takes place in real-time, but the player has the option of pausing the game to review cards and actions, and to place or collect cards from the board. The game ultimately has many different parallel victory and failure conditions, both based on "sane" and "insane" routes that the player's character may uncover.

== Plot ==
The game lacks a central plot structure that the player follows. Instead, the lore of the game is revealed through a variety of explorations to different ruins, reading of found books, and other methods. In order to accomplish this, the player can learn to speak a variety of languages such as Latin or Sanskrit to help decode knowledge found.

During the course, the player is confronted by two factions, the "Hunters" of the Suppression Bureau, which hunt the player, and "Rivals", which are other cults hunting for the same secrets and power. The player will have to deal with both groups throughout the game. If the player character dies in a run, the game restarts and the new player character is likely to be investigating the conditions for the death of the previous player character.

== Development ==
Weather Factory is an independent game studio created by Alexis Kennedy, who previously had founded Failbetter Games. Failbetter had developed several gothic and Lovecraftian horror story-driven games, including Fallen London. Kennedy split from Failbetter and founded Weather Factory in 2016, looking for a more hands-on role in designing and writing than his management-focused role at Failbetter. Cultist Simulator represented the studio's first game and an experimental title that they could produce quickly with minimal costs. Humble Bundle published the game.

The use of card-driven narrative systems was already something Kennedy was familiar with through Fallen London. Kennedy said that a card-based approach helped to make concepts tangible and allowed players to organize the cards as they saw best fit. Cultist Simulator represented the most minimalist take Kennedy could take with the card-based concept, since cards represented a vast vocabulary of terms within the game. While Kennedy provided user interface elements to help the player understand where to place cards, much of the strategy and reasoning was something he wanted players to discover for themselves. Kennedy did this to both mimic crafting systems in other role-playing games, and to create the Lovecraftian feel to the game. Kennedy said the player "will be able to mesh together an understanding of this very deep, very complicated lore in the same way that the scholars of Lovecraft are actually doing in fiction."

Kennedy announced the project in September 2016, providing a free simplified web-driven version of how the game would play, and with plans to use Kickstarter to raise funds for an anticipated October 2017 release date. Kennedy launched the Kickstarter in September 2017 and pushed the release date into May 2018; the Kickstarted succeeded in obtaining £82,000 of its target £30,000 fundraising goal. The game was released on 31 May 2018 for Microsoft Windows, macOS, and Linux systems.

Kennedy extended Cultist Simulator through downloadable content following the Paradox Interactive model. The first such content, "The Dancer", was released on 16 October 2018. A free update released on 22 January 2019 includes an extended end-game, where the player is challenged to take their successful cult leader and elevate them into a godlike state. Two additional DLC packs, "Priest" and "Ghoul" were released in May 2019, alongside the Cultist Simulator: Anthology Edition which includes the game and all DLC content in a single package. In May 2020, a DLC named "Exile" was released, which traded the base game's lore-researching and cult-building mechanics for flight across a map of 1920s Eurasia and North Africa from close pursuit by occult gangsters.

Published by Playdigious, ports for iOS and Android and were released on 2 April 2019. A port for Nintendo Switch titled Cultist Simulator: Initiate Edition was released on 2 February 2021.

== Reception ==
Reception

Aggregate scores
Aggregator	Score
Metacritic	PC: 71/100; NS: 65/100
OpenCritic	50% recommend

Review scores
Publication	Score
Nintendo World Report	7/10
PC Gamer (US)	8.5/10
RPGFan	90/100
TouchArcade	4.5/5
VentureBeat	90/100

Cultist Simulator received "mixed or average" reviews from critics, according to the review aggregation website Metacritic. Fellow review aggregator OpenCritic assessed that the game received strong approval, being recommended by 50% of critics.

TouchArcade enjoyed the visual style of the game, saying it beautifully evoked "the early 20th century aesthetic of the game’s narrative". Nintendo World Report felt it could take too long to make meaningful progress, and it was easy to make a mistake that would reset it. PC Gamer liked how the trial and error gameplay could lead to experimentation, "each failure comes with a bit more knowledge of how the game works and how to avoid whichever disaster befell you the last time". Eurogamer praised the writing, saying it evoked a feeling of "a protean clutch of riddles, scholarly marginalia, back-alley rumours and pointed epithets".

According to Alexis Kennedy, Cultist Simulator's sales surpassed 35,000 units within six days of release, which caused the game to break even and generate a profit in its first week. Its sales were similar in volume to those of Sunless Sea over the same period.

Cultist Simulator won the award for "Best Emotional Game Design" at the Emotional Game Awards 2018. It was nominated in the "Debut Game" and "Game Innovation" categories for the 15th British Academy Games Awards, and won the awards for "Best Game Design" and "Best Innovation" at the Develop:Star Awards, whereas its other nomination was for "Best Narrative".
