= Book of Hours (video game) =

2023 video game

- Developer: Weather Factory
- Publisher: Weather Factory
- Series: Secret Histories
- Engine: Unity
- Platforms: Linux; macOS; Windows
- Release: 17 August 2023
- Genres: Indie; RPG; Simulation
- Mode: Single-player

Book of Hours is a narrative RPG developed and published by indie studio Weather Factory. It was released for Linux, macOS, and Windows computer systems on 17 August 2023.

In a 1930s library of occult knowledge off the coast of Cornwall, the player assumes the role of a librarian and repairs the expansive building, organizing books and tending to the house. The player crafts tools and unveils mysteries hidden in the volumes of the library's collection and its very walls, serving the needs of patrons in search of hidden knowledge and influencing the events of the hidden world around them. This game uses a similar card system to its predecessor Cultist Simulator with less focus on the perils of the occult world and with a cozier environment and tone.

With more than 180,000 words at launch, the game elaborates on the complex world and narratives of the Secret Histories franchise it shares with Cultist Simulator, TTRPG The Lady Afterwards, and upcoming CRPG Travelling at Night.

== Gameplay ==
Screenshot of reading a book towards the middle of the gameplay progression

Book of Hours is a narrative-driven simulation game that focuses on the player character's role as a solitary librarian, restoring, exploring, and organizing the "Hush House," a grand centuries-old library off the coast of Cornwall. The primary gameplay loop consists of recruiting residents of the small village surrounding the library to assist in repairing the dilapidated rooms, cataloguing and organizing the collection found within, and reading the collection to understand more of the occult world and thus enable the librarian to explore further into the house.

Contrary to its roguelike predecessor, Book of Hours places an emphasis on being less challenging and punishing. The player rarely encounters threats, with challenge arising from increasingly difficult stat requirements to progress.

== Plot ==
The game lacks a central plot, but follows the librarian uncovering the "Hush House", the library and main setting, while they serve patrons from the outside world. Though affairs in the game world change and influence the needs of the player's guests, the player rarely learns the details of these events.

In the House of Light DLC, the patrons and events beyond the library are expanded on. The player can host dinner parties with guests and make conversation to learn more and interact with guests to help conclude an affair.

== Development ==
Weather Factory is an independent game studio created by Alexis Kennedy, who previously had founded Failbetter Games. Failbetter had developed several gothic and Lovecraftian horror story-driven games, including Fallen London. Kennedy split from Failbetter and founded Weather Factory in 2016, looking for a more hands-on role in designing and writing than his management-focused role at Failbetter.

The concept for Book of Hours originally came in the context of an expansion for the studio's successful debut game Cultist Simulator, and eventually expanded in a standalone game. Book of Hours was officially announced on 31 May 2019 on the one-year anniversary of Cultist Simulator. The game was intended to receive a crowdfunding campaign on Kickstarter in September 2019, but would be put on hold shortly before the launch due to a PR concern. The game was released on 17 August 2023 on Windows, macOS, and Linux systems.

A paid DLC titled HOUSE OF LIGHT was released on 26 September 2024.

== Reception ==
Though Book of Hours received less critical acclaim compared to its predecessor, reviews it received were generally positive, with reviewers highlighting the flavorful setting and artwork. Despite this, reviewers noted the game's complexity and difficulty, with mechanics and lore sometimes being obtuse without the context of Cultist Simulator.

In a retrospective blog post, developer Alexis Kennedy stated it was the most successful game of his and Weather Factory cofounder Lottie Bevan's careers.
