= Mask of the Rose =

- Developer: Failbetter Games
- Publisher: Failbetter Games
- Engine: Unity
- Platforms: Linux; macOS; Nintendo Switch; Windows
- Release: macOS, Switch, Windows, Linux; June 8, 2023
- Genre: Visual novel
- Mode: Single-player

Mask of the Rose is a 2023 visual novel developed by Failbetter Games and is set in the same universe as Fallen London, Sunless Sea, and Sunless Skies. It has elements of detective games and dating sims. Mask of the Rose was released in June 2023 for Linux, macOS, Switch, and Windows.

== Gameplay ==
Gameplay screenshot.

In 1862, bats cause London to be pulled underground. Lovecraftian monsters enter London, the dead rise, and Queen Victoria refuses to leave her palace. Mask of the Rose is a prequel to Fallen London and its spinoff games, Sunless Sea and Sunless Skies. It is a visual novel that can be optionally played as a dating sim. Players can date various characters or act as a matchmaker to them. Players can customize their character, and the choices they make, such as what clothes they wear, affect how non-player characters perceive them. Besides the dating elements, players can investigate a false accusation of murder made against one of their friends. During their investigation, players can assemble motives and evidence, then question people based on them. Players' actions advance time, and the game ends when time runs out.

== Development ==
Failbetter Games crowdfunded Mask of the Rose in February 2021, and it reached its goal in the first day. It was developed in Unity, using Ink for the dialogue. Failbetter previously used StoryNexus, a dialogue system that they designed themselves. For Mask of the Rose, they wanted middleware that was more appropriate for short lines of dialogue. It had to be delayed for two months after Failbetter added additional features and needed time for more playtesting. Mask of the Rose was released on June 8, 2023.

== Reception ==
Mask of the Rose has a "fair" rating on OpenCritic, and 60% of the surveyed critics recommended it. Though Rock Paper Shotgun's reviewer enjoyed Mask of the Rose, she was disappointed by the dating sim elements and said most of her relationships "totally fizzled out". PC Gamer praised the writing and characters but said the rest of the game "never fully gels together". Eurogamer called it "incredibly ambitious" and said this can work against it, too, because they felt the game does not make it clear enough what players should be doing.

== See also ==
- Fallen London
- Sunless Sea
- Sunless Skies
