= Alexis Kennedy =

Video game developer (born 1972)

- Born: 1972 (age 53–54)
- Occupations: Video game writer, designer
- Spouses: Ana Avalon (m. 2008; div. 2015) Lottie Bevan (m. 2022)
- Writing career
- Notable works: Fallen London; Sunless Sea; Cultist Simulator

Alexis Kennedy (born 1972) is a British video game writer, designer and entrepreneur. His video game work includes Fallen London, Sunless Sea and Cultist Simulator. Kennedy founded Failbetter Games in 2009, where he worked as its chief narrative officer and creative lead until 2016. He co-founded Weather Factory, an independent game studio in London in 2017.

== Career ==
=== Failbetter Games ===
In 2009, Kennedy developed the browser game Fallen London. He founded the company Failbetter Games in January 2010. Failbetter initially developed browser-based interactive fiction, including Fallen London and a platform called Story Nexus for other interactive fiction. The company later developed narrative PC and mobile games, starting with Sunless Sea and an iOS port of Fallen London. Early in 2016, Kennedy opened Fundbetter, an initiative at Failbetter to fund promising narrative games and interactive fiction projects. As of May 2016, Fundbetter had announced five funded projects.

In June 2016, Kennedy announced that he was leaving the company to do more creative, than managerial, work through freelancing. He sold his majority shareholder stake in Failbetter for 60 percent of the company's cash, rather than 60 percent of its value, to help the company operate without issue.

=== Freelance work ===
In August 2016, Kennedy began work on a piece of standalone downloadable content (DLC) for Paradox Interactive's Stellaris. In December 2016, the DLC was announced as an "interactive cosmic horror novelette" called Horizon Signal.

In September 2016, Kennedy said that he was working with the Dragon Age team in BioWare for an unannounced project as a freelance writer. He also worked on an unspecified research and development project with Telltale Games.

=== Weather Factory ===
In 2017, Kennedy co-founded a game studio called Weather Factory with Lottie Bevan, a former producer at Failbetter, to make experimental games. The company used an open development process to create Cultist Simulator. Kennedy released an alpha version and a Kickstarter campaign to complete it was funded within one day. The game was released on 31 May 2018, with iOS and Android capability the next year. It was nominated for best debut game and game innovation at the British Academy Games Awards. Kennedy reported in February 2019 that Cultist Simulator had grossed more than $1.76 million in sales.

In 2019 he announced work on a game based on placing the player in charge of an occult library called Book of Hours, set in the same universe as Cultist Simulator. Book of Hours released on August 17, 2023.

== Personal life ==
Kennedy's father was the pilot Hugh Kennedy, who died under unusual circumstances. On several occasions, Kennedy has spoken about how the traumatic and unusual nature of his father's and brother's deaths have influenced his work.

Kennedy runs Weather Factory out of the spare bedroom of his home in London with his wife and fellow Failbetter alumni Lottie Bevan.

== Misconduct allegations ==
In August 2019, Kennedy was accused by Meg Jayanth, a writer on Sunless Sea, and Olivia Wood, a writer at Failbetter, of crossing "professional boundaries" with multiple women, including direct reports. He denied the allegations, describing them as a "malicious misrepresentation", and stating that he was filing a police complaint. In response to the allegations, three of the five projects participating in Weather Factory's mentorship program withdrew from it. Failbetter Games, in a statement on Twitter, said that "We believe and stand with everyone who has come forward to speak out about Alexis Kennedy tonight." Alexis Kennedy denied the allegations and suggested third-party mediation, with the cost split between him and Failbetter Games. In 2023, after a legal case on validity of the sale of his Failbetter shares, Kennedy and Failbetter settled their ongoing disputes.

== Works ==
- Fallen London, 2009 (original developer, lead writer)
- Machine Cares!, 2012 (creative director)
- Dragon Age: The Last Court, 2014 (creative director)
- Sunless Sea, 2015 (creative director, lead writer)
- Stellaris: Horizon Signal, 2017 (writer, designer)
- Cultist Simulator, 2018 (design, writing, coding)
- Sunless Skies, 2019 (initial concept)
- Book of Hours, 2023
- Travelling at Night, 2026
