= Thirsty Suitors =

2023 video game

- Developer: Outerloop Games
- Publisher: Annapurna Interactive (Note: Mobile version published by Netflix.)
- Director: Chandana Ekanayake
- Producers: Sunny Dube; Chandana Ekanayake; Anne-Marie Weber
- Designers: Sunny Dube; Anna Krasner; Justin LaLone; Sadie Lee; Aung Zaw Do
- Programmers: Ben Glous; Anna Krasner; Justin LaLone
- Artists: Chandana Ekanayake; Lisa Fleck; Aleasha Ford; Darran Hurlbut; Emma Koch
- Writers: Meg Jayanth; Chandana Ekanayake; Nadie Sharmmas; Leigh Alexander; Sunny Dube; Sadie Lee; Phillip Russell; Cassandra Khaw
- Composer: Ramsey Kharroubi
- Engine: Unity
- Platforms: Windows; Nintendo Switch; PlayStation 4; PlayStation 5; Xbox One; Xbox Series X/S; Android; iOS
- Release: November 2, 2023; Android, iOS; TBA
- Genres: Adventure, dating sim, role-playing
- Mode: Single-player

Thirsty Suitors is an adventure video game developed by Outerloop Games and published by Annapurna Interactive. The game is about a young woman, Jala, who returns to her hometown for her sister's wedding and must navigate her relationships with her family and former paramours. The game was released on November 2, 2023, for Nintendo Switch, PlayStation 4, PlayStation 5, Windows, Xbox One and Xbox Series X/S. Ports to Android and iOS published by Netflix were in development but ultimately abandoned.

Thirsty Suitors received generally positive reviews from critics.

== Gameplay ==
The player can engage in various game modes, including skateboarding, cooking minigames, and character conversations which function like turn-based battles. To build Jala's personality, the game's daydream sequence at the start lets players build her "Thirstsona" by making narrative choices based on what Jala is around her Thirstsona by three classes; Heartbreaker, Star, or Bohemian.

For the turn-based battles, players need to choose from taunts, attacks, skills and items that ties back to the game's story, either flirt your opponent to weaken them or enrage them by their thirsty mood. The more you fight from Jala's run-ins with her exes, the more backstory from her on the choices you make Jala from her Thirstsona. When you level up, your rank around your Thirstsona will choose around the three classes by what status you are in.

== Plot ==
The game opens with Jala leaving a three-year relationship with her girlfriend and moving back in with her parents, after cutting off all contact with them. She is accompanied by an imaginary coping mechanism named The Narrator that is based on her sister Aruni. After being dropped off at the diner, she runs into Sergio, her first boyfriend from elementary school. The two battle, but ultimately come to terms with their relationship and become friends. Sergio drives Jala home, then calls together a meeting with Diya, Irfan, Bruno, Andile, and Tyler, all of whom have had romantic relationships with Jala in the past, and informs them all that Jala is back in town.

The next day Jala learns from her parents that Aruni is getting married at the end of the month. Jala also learns that Paati, her grandmother, will be coming to town for the wedding. Jala attempts to find Aruni to talk to her, but Aruni is avoiding her. A mysterious text causes Jala to check out the skate park, where she learns that a cult has started up based around a man named Soundie, who wears a bear mascot costume and is fighting to keep the park from being sold. Soundie wants Jala to join the cult, but decides to put her through tests first. Tyler is attempting to gather information on Soundie, and Jala and Tyler start working together.

Over the next few days Jala is confronted by Diya, Irfan, Bruno, and Andile, all of whom are upset with how Jala treated them when they were dating. Jala manages to beat and reconcile with each one, except Bruno, who chooses to leave town instead. At the same time, Jala battles the various members of Soundie's cult, hoping to get them to leave in the process. After she defeats them all, Soundie reveals that she has only made their fate in the cult stronger, and that he plans to use the fact that the mayor's daughter is in the cult to blackmail the mayor into giving up their position and putting himself in charge. Tyler becomes upset that Jala has ruined her investigation and stops talking to her again.

While Jala is cooking with her mother, The Narrator becomes frustrated at her inability to confront people and forces Jala to lash out at her mom. The two have an argument, but ultimately come to an understanding. Jala's mother forces her and Aruni to finally meet, and the two talk and also reconcile. That night, it's revealed that Aruni was the one who convinced Sergio to gather together Jala's exes, and points out that Tyler is the only one who has yet to forgive Jala and encourages her to try. The next day Jala and Tyler get into a fight, and once again, The Narrator attempts to force Jala to lash out. However, Tyler can hear The Narrator as well, and the two ultimately become friends again despite The Narrator's efforts. Tyler warns Jala that The Narrator is a dangerous coping mechanism, and Jala chooses to banish it.

Right before the wedding, Paati finally arrives. She demands Jala cooks for her, and during the cooking, the two get into a fight. Paati initially defeats Jala, but she is able to call on her family and friends to help her out. Ultimately, Jala convinces Paati to finally forgive her mother for leaving India, and the family manages to work things out.

In a post-credits scene, Jala, her family, and her exes are all hanging out at the diner together. Jala talks to her exes, and imagines what life could have been like with each one. Finally, Jala goes to leave the diner, unsure of what her future will hold but excited to find out.

== Development ==
The game was developed by Seattle-based Outerloop Games, who previously released Falcon Age in 2019. The studio began their development process by selecting three ideas for games to present to others in the video games industry in a pitch deck; the idea which later became Thirsty Suitors received the most positive attention. Co-founder and creative director of Outerloop, Chandana Ekanayake, noted that most of the individuals to whom Outerloop pitched the game were middle-aged white men, which caused Ekanayake to change his pitching strategy. This change involved focusing on the dearth of South Asian narratives in games, and highlighting successful media with such stories, such as the film Bend it Like Beckham and the television show Never Have I Ever.

After deciding to move forward with the idea behind Thirsty Suitors exclusively, Outerloop eventually secured financing from Annapurna Interactive. Outerloop increased its headcount to fourteen to develop the game. The game was announced in December 2021. Early gameplay footage was shown in June 2022. On July 28, 2022, the game was announced to be scheduled for release on Microsoft Windows, Nintendo Switch, PlayStation 4, PlayStation 5, Xbox One, and Xbox Series X/S, with a demo releasing on Steam the same day. In June 2023, it was announced that the game would release on November 2, 2023.

== Reception ==
Reception

Aggregate scores
Aggregator	Score
Metacritic	PC: 80/100; PS5: 74/100; XSXS: 77/100; NS: 78/100
OpenCritic	79/100; 70% Critics Recommend

Review scores
Publication	Score
Digital Trends	3.5/5
Eurogamer	4/5
GamesRadar+	4/5
IGN	8/10
PC Gamer (US)	84/100
Push Square	8/10
Shacknews	8/10

The game received "generally favorable reviews" according to review aggregator website Metacritic. 79% of critics recommend the game on OpenCritic.

Sanya Ahmed of IGN praised its story that while it can feel like it rushed at times, its pressure of a judgmental family and reconciling with exes through exaggerated battles makes the game very worthwhile. Eurogamer's Kaan Serin enjoyed the game as "a confident swing that takes commonplace romantic mishaps and turns them into epic, queer spectacles."

A review from WIRED praised the game being wildly creative as a hilarious and refreshing game made for the South Asian community, brimming with its cultural heritage and features good food loving families but does not paper over the bad from the challenges related to Jala's LGBTQ+ identity. The Escapist reviews the game as stylish and coherent by its artwork and with the music, animation and effects all supporting this though.

Nicole Carpenter from Polygon wrote about the game being a maximalist in both its visuals and mechanics with no shortage of sincerity tied up in there. Kyle LeClair from Hardcore Gamer reviews the game for its "well-crafted RPG mechanics and satisfying combat, but its gleefully wild and colorful style and superb dialogue and characters are truly its biggest strength."

Siobhán Casey's Rock Paper Shotgun praised the game as a breezy, janky RPG with emotional maturity that is "downright exciting to play something that, in place of overblown fantasy worldbuilding, is more interested in reflecting cultures, demographics, and relatable struggles that rarely get a spotlight in mainstream games."

=== Accolades ===
Awards and nominations
Year	Ceremony	Category	Result	Ref.
2024	13th New York Game Awards	Herman Melville Award for Best Writing in a Game	Nominated	
2024	27th Annual D.I.C.E. Awards	Outstanding Achievement for an Independent Game	Nominated	
2024	27th Annual D.I.C.E. Awards	Outstanding Achievement in Character (Jala)	Nominated	
2024	27th Annual D.I.C.E. Awards	Outstanding Achievement in Story	Nominated	
2024	Game Developers Choice Awards 2024	Social Impact Award	Honorable mention	
2024	20th British Academy Games Awards	Game Beyond Entertainment	Nominated	
