= Erin Morgenstern =

American novelist

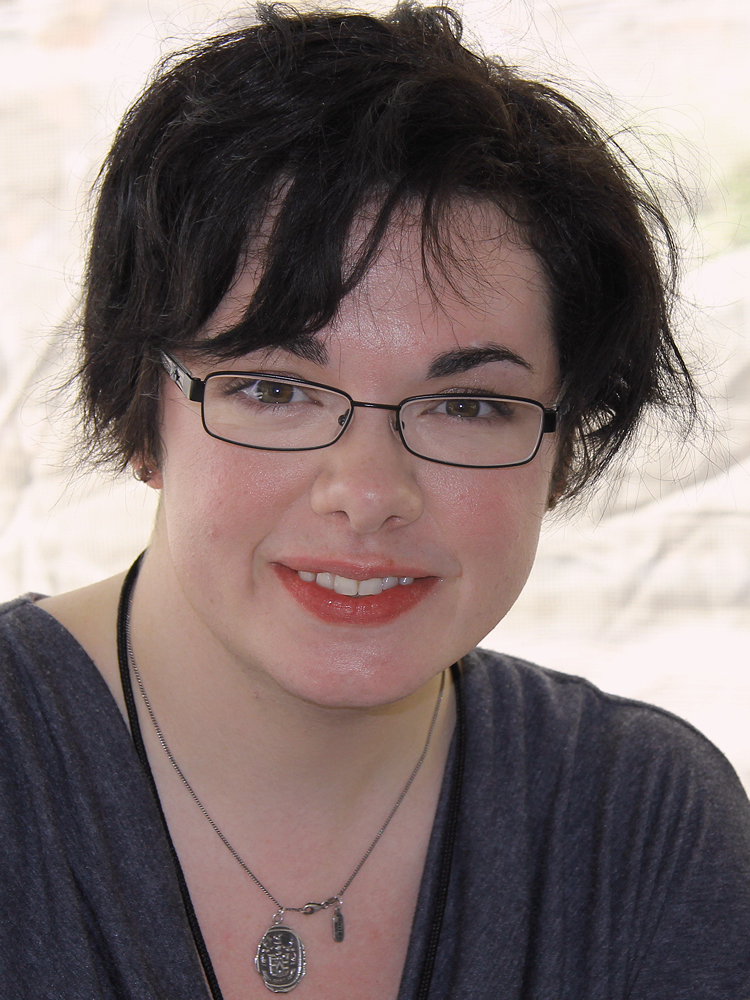
- Morgenstern at the 2011 Texas Book Festival
- Born: July 8, 1978 (age 48)
- Education: Smith College (BA)
- Occupation: Novelist
- Writing career
- Genre: Fantasy
- Notable work: The Night Circus
- Notable awards: Locus Award for Best First Novel
- Website: erinmorgenstern.com

Erin Morgenstern (born July 8, 1978) is an American multimedia artist and the author of two fantasy novels. The Night Circus (2011) was published in more than a dozen languages by 2013 and won the annual Locus Award for Best First Novel. She is a 2012 recipient of an Alex Award. Her second book, The Starless Sea, was published in 2019.

== Life ==
Erin Morgenstern was raised in Marshfield, Massachusetts, and studied theater and studio art at Smith College in Northampton, Massachusetts, graduating in 2000. In addition to writing, she paints, mostly in acrylics, including the Phantomwise tarot deck. She signed with Inkwell Management in May 2010 after being rejected by thirty literary agents, and sold her debut novel to Doubleday in September 2010; The Night Circus was published in September 2011. She has participated in National Novel Writing Month since 2003, and first wrote about what would become The Night Circus in November 2005. Morgenstern has since moved to New York City.

== The Night Circus ==
Morgenstern's debut novel, The Night Circus, was published in September 2011. It is a phantasmagorical fairy tale of magic and romance set in an ahistorical late 19th century London. The book has drawn comparison with the Harry Potter series, as well as the works of Neil Gaiman, Ray Bradbury, Susanna Clarke, and Steven Millhauser; it is not aimed at young adults, but has been recommended for teens. The first printing runs to 175,000, and the rights have been sold in 30 countries; Summit Entertainment has contracted the film rights. Jim Dale, who narrates the American edition Harry Potter audiobooks, also narrates the audiobook of The Night Circus. Harvill Secker, the UK publisher for The Night Circus, contracted Failbetter Games to create an interactive browser-based puzzle game to accompany the book.

In an interview with the School Library Journal, Morgenstern describes the short, self-contained chapters as reflecting the myriad tents of the circus, and the black and white with a splash of red motif as showing dangerous passion simmering just below the surface.

The Night Circus won an Alex Award from the American Library Association, the 2012 Locus Award for Best First Novel, and spent seven weeks on The New York Times Best Seller list.

== The Starless Sea ==
On November 8, 2018, it was announced that Doubleday would publish a new novel by Morgenstern titled The Starless Sea. Entertainment Weekly described The Starless Sea as a "sweeping new novel interweaving romantic and fantastical elements." The book was released on November 5, 2019.
