= The Starless Sea =

2019 novel by Erin Morgenstern

- First edition (UK)
- Author: Erin Morgenstern
- Language: English
- Genre: Speculative fiction Metafiction
- Publisher: Doubleday (US); Harvill Secker (UK)
- Publication date: November 5, 2019
- Publication place: United States
- ISBN: 978-0-385-54121-3

The Starless Sea is a 2019 speculative fiction novel by Erin Morgenstern. It is her second book, following the best-selling The Night Circus, which was published in 2011. The novel reached number three on The New York Times Best Seller list, and was also a Los Angeles Times and Sunday Times bestseller.

== Summary ==
The Starless Sea is told through a non-linear structure built around a number of overlapping embedded narratives; Each of the six books of the novel (apart from book IV) intersperses the linear primary narrative with excerpts from an in-universe text that the characters read through and analyze in step with the reader.

The frame narrative follows Zachary Ezra Rawlins, a graduate student who comes across a mysterious book titled Sweet Sorrows in his university library. Sweet Sorrows appears to be a fantastical short fiction collection, describing a book-filled labyrinth called the Harbor on the shores of an underground Starless Sea, but Zachary instead discovers one of the stories to be a perfect description of an experience he had as a child, despite the book having been published before it happened. Zachary had discovered a lifelike painting of a door on a wall and considered attempting to open it, but dismissed the door as graffiti and returned the next day to find it painted over. Zachary traces evidence of the Starless Sea to an exclusive literary costume party in New York. He meets a storyteller named Dorian, who recounts a story of the embodiment of Fate being torn apart by a parliament of owls after she falls in love with Time.

Dorian warns Zachary that an organization called the Collector's Club is targeting him to retrieve Sweet Sorrows, confirming the Sea's existence. Dorian recruits Zachary to steal a fairy tale collection titled Fortunes and Fables from the club, however Zachary's ruse is discovered on his way back to Dorian. Dorian explains that Mirabel, another party-goer, is responsible for painting functional doorways leading to the Harbor as he and Zachary attempt to escape through one in Central Park, only for the club to catch up and capture Dorian just as Zachary travels through. Now in the Harbor described by Sweet Sorrows, Zachary finds it to be deserted apart from Mirabel, an acolyte named Rhyme, and Mirabel's lover, a seemingly ageless harbor-master called the Keeper. Mirabel and Zachary free a drugged Dorian, narrowly escaping the club's leader, Allegra.

Zachary explores the harbor as Dorian recovers. He finds the Starless Sea itself had actually receded as the Harbor's population had dwindled over time, and receives mysterious notes instructing him to find a "man lost in time" mentioned in Sweet Sorrows. He finds a third book, The Ballad of Simon and Eleanor, which describes two residents of the Sea who lived generations apart, but met and fell in love through a temporal anomaly in the Harbor. The two conceived a child, revealed to be Mirabel, before both set out into the depths of the Harbor to find one another again after the anomaly was sealed. Allegra is revealed to have been Mirabel's adoptive mother before she was overwhelmed by apocalyptic visions of the Harbor's destruction and founded the Collector's Club to protect it.

Dorian and Zachary study the texts together, concluding that Simon is the man lost in time Zachary must find before theorizing that Mirabel and the Keeper are actually Fate and Time from Dorian's fairy tale. Allegra suddenly appears in an attempt to close all doors to the Sea from within, causing an earthquake that plunges both her and Dorian into the caverns below the Harbor. Mirabel leads Zachary into the caverns below, revealing the Harbors to have been built on top of one another as the Sea rose over time. Mirabel admits to her identity as Fate, having reincarnated countless times after her initial death, but insists she can only indirectly influence events and that Zachary must choose his actions for himself. They are separated by a swarm of owls and Zachary is rescued by Simon, who describes Zachary's story as a literal presence that has now followed him down, further dooming the already crumbling Harbor.

Dorian survives the fall when he lands in the Starless Sea, revealed to be a vast ocean of honey, and is rescued by Eleanor, now a proficient sailor. Allegra is found to have been killed on impact, and Eleanor drops Dorian off at an inn described in Fortunes and Fables. There, the characters from the collection hand him a living human heart recovered from Fate when she was first torn apart, and warn him against mysterious spirits and hallucinations that haunt the depths. Dorian battles his way past an array of illusions to find Zachary, only to accidentally slay him. In purgatory, Zachary negotiates a meeting with Mirabel, who thanks him for finding Simon and fulfilling his fate. Dorian resurrects Zachary by replacing his heart with Fate's as he, Zachary, and Simon are picked up by Eleanor's ship and ascend upward. The Harbor is flooded with honey and destroyed.

Zachary's old friend Kat secretly journals her efforts to find Zachary after his disappearance, eventually realizing the Sea's existence for herself. She declines an offer from Allegra to join the Collector's Club, but agrees to drop her investigation to keep the Sea secret. Kat moves on with her studies and career, only to receive notes directing her to a mysterious door in an abandoned building. Mirabel, Rhyme, and the Keeper reunite outside as Kat opens the door, revealing a new Harbor recreated atop the old.

== Reception ==
Leigha McReynolds, reviewing for LA Review of Books, praised the ambition and structure of The Starless Sea, describing the plot as rewarding to unravel but requiring readers to have great tolerance for its use of metafiction. McReynolds noted the focus on philosophy and metatext over a conventional plot structure, expressing difficulty with categorizing the novel in a specific genre and concluding that "it may not have given me all that I wanted, but it did give me something I appreciate."

The Guardian review by Natasha Pulley describes The Starless Sea as a novel that rejects traditions and conventions of world building; a that rejects older stories to make up its own. Pulley describes the myriad images, snippets of backstories, and tales within tales as "assuredly beautiful", but recognizes that "there is no logic that binds these lovely set piece tableaux. Nobody explains why the Starless Sea is honey, or how a honey sea isn’t full of dead flies. The novel reads like panel after panel of mythic illustrations: it expects a certain acceptance of unlikely images". She writes that some readers might find this approach infuriating, while asserting that this is because it challenges deep-seated conventions of the fantasy genre. She further maintains that The Starless Sea demands to be read on its own terms, not those set in those different times and places readers have come to recognize: "Rather than a traditional fantasy novel, this is an artificial myth in its own right, soldered together from the girders of skyscrapers – a myth from and for the US, rather than inherited from older nations. Like any myth, it refuses to decode its own symbols. A reader might find this deliberate vagueness either uplifting or maddening, but the novel’s scope and ambition are undeniable."

Lyndsay Faye, in her New York Times book review, finds the pastiche that is The Starless Sea to be unrewarding. She doesn't find the main character compelling, but does praise Morgenstern's style, which "especially in the frequent Grimm-esque interludes, employs aggressively simple children’s literature syntax to describe outlandish settings that are either opulent or decaying. Her skill at rendering these spaces is remarkable, the smells of smoke and honey wafting through stone corridors and nameless cats slinking along secret passageways.... But a cigar is never just a cigar, and it’s impossible to settle in without being bludgeoned by mystique." But she finds the crippled by "numbingly vague expostulation" and "pseudo-philosophical sentences". Faye concludes: "The Starless Sea flounders as a novel. As an ode to an aesthetic, however, it is marvelous, rife with stags carrying lit candles on their antlers, fallen cherry blossoms and story-sculptors who put their chronicles in clouds. 'I’m not sure I’m following the metaphors anymore,' Zachary objects. He won’t be alone. But for those swept away by the romance of its imagery, The Starless Sea will provide hours of honey-drenched bliss."

Adrienne Martini, in Locus Magazine, describes how "Morgenstern takes great glee in subverting expectations for what a story needs to contain in this, um, story," explaining that the difficulty in describing or following the novel's plot narrative is because The Starless Sea is less about the narrative plot, and more about the philosophical underpinnings of stories themselves. She concludes that "Like any story, The Starless Sea has a beginning and an ending. It also has a middle – a lot of middle. Morgenstern crams about a billion ideas – including but not limited to game design, folk tales, cocktails, and bees – into the endless-feeling middle. Some of them open up her tale in interesting ways; some don’t live up to their promises. She takes a big, admirable swing but doesn’t completely connect. Still, it’s a book full of beautiful moments, even if they don’t all work in concert."

Amal El-Mohtar, however, writes for NPR that The Starless Sea made her feel like "a child falling into a story again," finding the narrative twists and turns exciting, and making her feel like she was "playing a puzzle game, being guided through a beautiful labyrinth of harbours and honey and bees." Because of this regard for the conceptual, she is disappointed by the more conventional villain-driven narrative that develops later in the book, taking it to its denouement. Her overall review, however, is unabashedly positive: "What did work for me, deeply and wholesomely and movingly, was the whole affect of the book, its warmth, its helpless love of storytelling and beautiful, polished fables. It's a book that's a pleasure to dwell in, a delicious experience to dip in and out of.... When I finished it, I was uncertain of my thoughts about the whole; the next night, when I realized there was nothing left of it to read, I felt lost and sad."

Kirkus praised The Starless Sea as "high-wire feat of metatextual derring-do... with mystery and passion inscribed on every page," citing the novel's ambition and prose. Booklist offered positive reviews from Leah von Essen and Colleen Regan, the latter praising the use of multiple narrators in the audiobook adaptation.

== Awards ==
- Dragon Award for Best Fantasy Novel (2020)
- Locus Award nominee for Best Fantasy Novel (2020)
- Goodreads Choice Award nominee for Fantasy (2019)
