= The Night Circus =

2011 fantasy novel by Erin Morgenstern

- Front cover of the first edition
- Author: Erin Morgenstern
- Audio read by: Jim Dale
- Language: English
- Genre: Magical realism Fantasy
- Publisher: Doubleday
- Publication date: 2011
- Publication place: United States
- Media type: Print (hardcover)
- Pages: 387 pp (first edition)

The Night Circus is a 2011 speculative fiction novel by Erin Morgenstern. It was originally written for the annual writing competition National Novel Writing Month (NaNoWriMo) over the span of three competitions. The novel has a nonlinear narrative written from multiple viewpoints.

== Synopsis ==
The Night Circus is a fairy tale set near an ahistorical Victorian London in a wandering, magical circus that only opens at night and closes at dawn. Called Le Cirque des Rêves (The Circus of Dreams), it features exhibitions such as illusionists, fortune-tellers, and attractions that defy the laws of physics and reality. The circus has no set schedule, appearing and disappearing in random cities and towns without warning. The circus is powered by real magic, with performers frequently pulling off feats that seem impossible to spectators. In addition to showcasing the world's best magical talent, the circus acts as a sparring ground for the protégés of two powerful magicians. The world-class illusionist Hector Bowen (better known by his stage name of Prospero the Enchanter) and the enigmatic Mr. A. H.— (also known as Alexander) agree to each raise and train a young magician, who will eventually face off against the other in a battle of wills and magic. Neither protégé is given the identity of their competitor. This secretive conflict by proxy is referred to as the "game." Hector forces his daughter, Celia Bowen, to perfect her own illusionary skills through rigorous and often cruel training methods. Meanwhile, Mr. A. H.— trains his orphan ward, Marco Alisdair, to create fantastical scenes that exist only in the mind of his magic's target.

When Celia and Marco come of age, both having developed into talented magicians, they are separately recruited to join the Circus of Dreams. Celia uses her magic to entertain crowds and maintain the circus's complex network of tents and otherworldly exhibits. Meanwhile, Marco works as the assistant to the circus's producer, which prevents him from directly traveling with the circus. As the game continues, Celia and Marco suspect that their competitor is working within the Circus of Dreams. They each construct exhibitions for the circus that showcase their powers, hoping this will let them win the game. Marco also starts a romantic relationship with the circus's fortune-teller, but he and Celia eventually fall in love after having learned that they are each other's competitor. However, other performers begin to grow suspicious of the circus's powers: they age extremely slowly and never seem permitted to leave the circus or have their acts fail. Tensions within the ensemble rise when one of the circus's initial investors dies under mysterious circumstances and acts begin to go wrong. When a spectator is accidentally stabbed in an exhibition, Celia resolves to end the game as quickly as possible, while also preserving the circus and those involved with it.

Celia learns from her father that the game will continue until one of the participants is unable to go on or dies. She also learns the circus contortionist, Tsukiko, participated in a previous installment of the game, winning only when her opponent committed suicide. After Celia and Marco's negotiations with Hector and Mr. A. H.— to end the competition fail, Marco comes up with a plan to use Tsukiko to entrap himself in the ever present bonfire, the source of the circus's power, which would end the contest, thus sparing the circus and its ensemble from further harm. Just as she is about to cast the spell, Celia rushes in to save him, which rips the two lovers from reality and binds them to the circus as incorporeal spirits. This triggers the Circus of Dreams to self-destruct, which is only stopped when Celia and Marco magically bind it to Bailey Clarke, a circus devotee. This arrangement restores the circus's spirit and saves it from ruin. With Celia and Marco both existing only as ghosts, the contest is declared complete via stalemate. Poppet and Widget, twin performers who were born and raised in the circus, negotiate the release of the remaining circus properties from its former producer and Mr. A. H.—. The book ends with the revelation that Poppet, Widget, Bailey, and the circus still exist in the modern day, having been preserved for over a century.

== Reception ==
The Night Circus has been compared to Harry Potter and Twilight, as well as to Neil Gaiman, Something Wicked This Way Comes, and Jonathan Strange & Mr Norrell.

Ron Charles writing for The Washington Post compares Morgenstern's imagery to Steven Millhauser's, albeit with "more playful and more dramatic surrealism". Olivia Laing writing for The Observer compares the book to an "eminently intriguing cabinet of curiosities" with an intricate but unmoored setting and colorful but clockwork characters. Laura Miller writing for Salon likewise praises the "aesthetic fantasia with all the trimmings" but not the plot itself. Sarah Stegall writing for SFScope praises the vivid imagery, predicting that it should be nominated for literary awards. Richard Peabody writing for the Washington Independent Review of Books describes the narrative as nonlinear, with frequent shifts in points of view, tangential vignettes, and short almost cinematic chapters. Stacey D'Erasmo writing for The New York Times Book Review criticizes the lack of specificity of the imagery, describing the experience as being "continually told how magical the circus and its denizens are without ever being truly surprised, entranced or beguiled."

The Night Circus was a candidate for the 2011 Guardian First Book Award. It won an Alex Award from the American Library Association in 2012. The novel spent seven weeks on The New York Times Best Seller list, reaching number two on the hardcover fiction list.

== Associated media ==
An audiobook version of The Night Circus is read by Jim Dale.

The UK publisher, Harvill Secker, contracted Failbetter Games, creators of Fallen London, to create a puzzle game to accompany the book. The site went live on September 1, 2011, two weeks before the book was published. The game has since been moved to the Storynexus site and modified to remove the aggressive social promotion that the original included.

The film and TV rights to The Night Circus were optioned by Summit Entertainment, and a film is being produced by David Heyman and Jeff Clifford under Heyday Films. Moira Buffini was hired in February 2012 to write the screenplay. In February 2019, it was announced that Geremy Jasper would direct the film adaptation for Lionsgate.
