= Meg Jayanth =

British video game writer

Meghna Jayanth
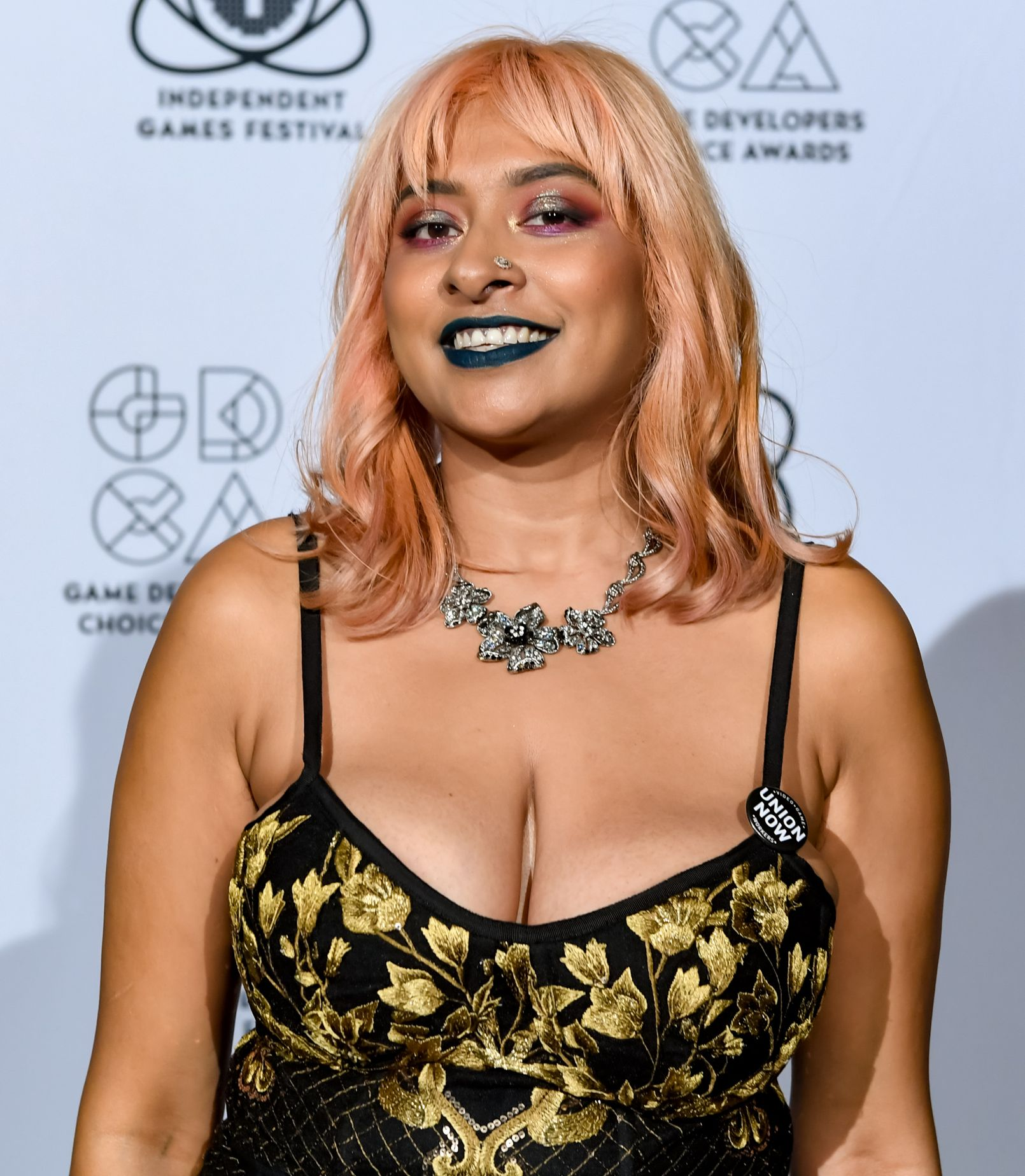
- Jayanth at the 2019 Independent Games Festival
- Born: 6 February 1987 (age 39)
- Occupation: Writer
- Known for: 80 Days
- Notable work: Sunless Sea; Horizon Zero Dawn

Meghna Jayanth (born 6 February 1987) is a video game writer and narrative designer. She is known for her writing on 80 Days and Sunless Sea. Jayanth worked at the BBC before becoming a freelance writer, and has also written for The Guardian on women and video games.

== Early life ==
Meghna Jayanth was born on 6 February 1987. While growing up, Jayanth lived in Bangalore, London, and Saudi Arabia, attending a total of 12 different schools. Her first gaming experiences included Disney's Aladdin, SimTower, and Civilization II. Jayanth studied English literature at the University of Oxford, where she directed The Oxford Revue, following which she worked at the BBC in the department responsible for commissioning video games.

Jayanth first became interested in writing for video games via online text-based roleplaying games in which she built worlds and characters. The first playable game she wrote was Samsara, a choice-based narrative game set in Bengal in 1757, which she has yet to finish. Jayanth is particularly interested in writing stories which explore "unexpected perspectives and unheard voices", including under-represented people and cultures.

== Career ==
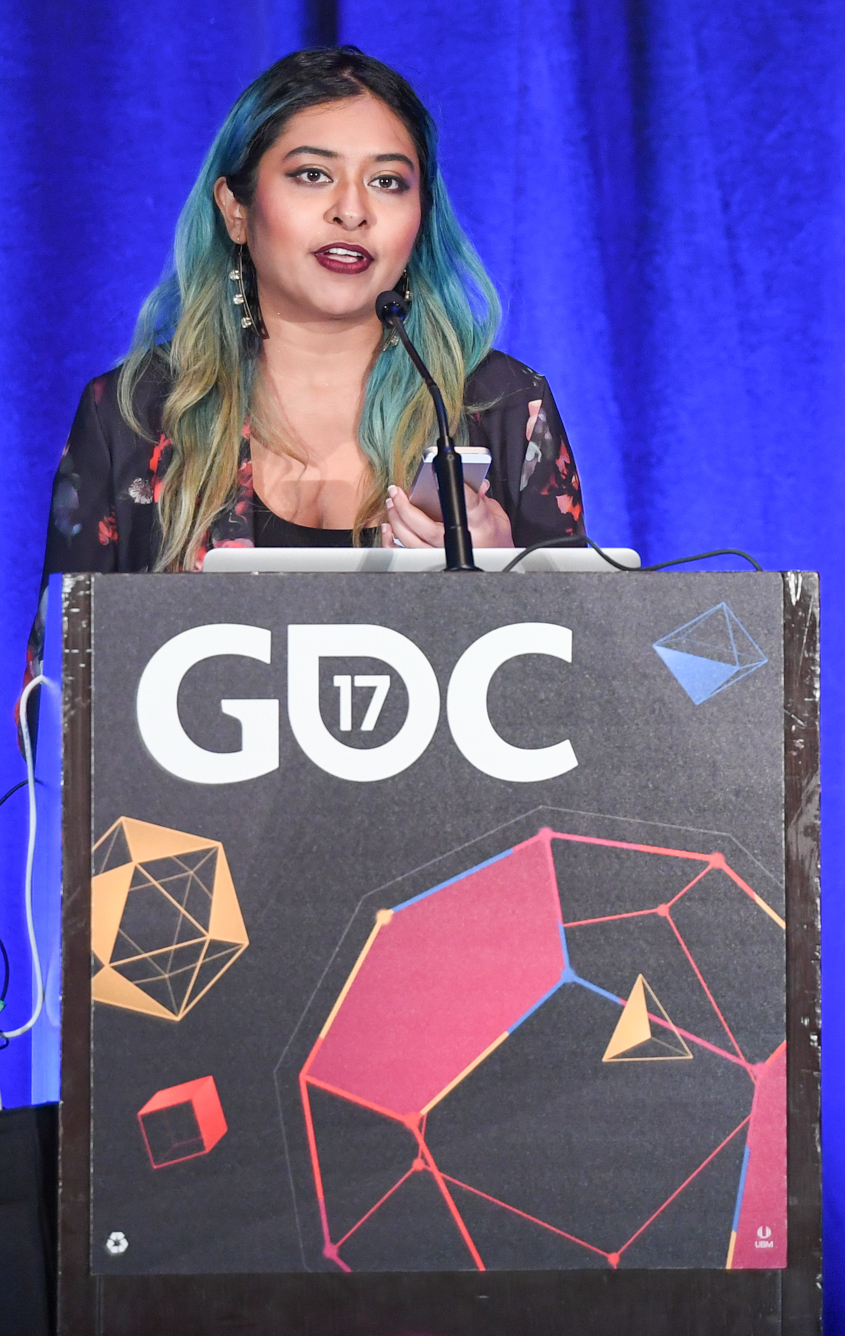
Meg Jayanth speaking at the 2017 Game Developers Conference

Jayanth was the writer of 80 Days, for which she wrote a total of more than 750,000 words, contributed to the writing for Horizon Zero Dawn, and was a writer for Sunless Sea. In addition to other accolades, 80 Days was nominated for a BAFTA Game Award for Story in 2014, and Meg won the UK Writers' Guild Award for Best Writing in a Video Game.

In 2019 Jayanth hosted the Independent Games Festival awards, where she used her opening speech to encourage the video game industry to reject hatred and create a welcoming and safe environment. In May of that year, she announced the formation of a "boutique narrative label" called Red Queens alongside Leigh Alexander.

Jayanth worked on Boyfriend Dungeon, Sable, and All Will Rise.

== Works ==
- 80 Days
- Horizon: Zero Dawn
- Sunless Sea
- Boyfriend Dungeon
- Falcon Age
- Sable
- Thirsty Suitors
- All Will Rise
