= Falcon Age =

2019 video game

- PlayStation 4 cover art
- Developer: Outerloop Games
- Publisher: Outerloop Games
- Director: Chandana Ekanayake
- Designer: Chandana Ekanayake
- Programmers: Ben Golus; Justin LaLone
- Artists: Chandana Ekanayake; Aung Zaw Oo; Darran Hurlbut
- Writers: Chandana Ekanayake; Meg Jayanth; Cassandra Khaw; Aung Zaw Oo; Justin LaLone
- Composers: Rob Pearsall, Jeffrey Pierce
- Engine: Unity
- Platforms: Microsoft Windows; PlayStation VR; Oculus Quest; Nintendo Switch
- Release: PlayStation VR; April 9, 2019; PC; September 6, 2019; Oculus Quest; September 3, 2020; Nintendo Switch; October 8, 2020
- Genre: Adventure
- Mode: Single-player

Falcon Age is a virtual reality first person adventure video game for Windows, PlayStation 4, Oculus Quest, and Nintendo Switch, developed and published by Outerloop Games. Initially released on PlayStation VR on April 9, 2019, it was also released on Nintendo Switch and Steam in October 2020.

== Gameplay ==
Players take the role of Ara who has been wrongfully thrown in jail on a dying colony planet with its culture destroyed, resources depleted, and turned into a desert by robotic machines. Starting in her cell, you pass the time by befriending a young falcon and escape together to reclaim their freedom and drive off the invaders. Players get to bond with their bird companion to dress up or hunt various animals for precious materials, which can be used for crafting snacks for your falcon to buff, heal and strengthen up its skills.

== Development ==
Developer Outerloop Games is based in Seattle. The idea around the project came from Chandana Ekanayake who worked on games like Monday Night Combat, Supreme Commander, Enter the Matrix and Elder Scrolls and co-founded his company Outerloop Games. Powered by the Unity engine, it started off as a VR prototype after seeing a YouTube clip of a giant golden eagle attacking a mountain goat. 80 Days writer Meg Jayanth was brought on to help flesh out the story concept of the game before Cassandra Khaw joined in later from his work on Where the Water Tastes Like Wine.

== Reception ==
Reception

Aggregate scores
Aggregator	Score
Metacritic	PS4: 70/100; NS: 65/100
OpenCritic	69/100

Review scores
Publication	Score
Easy Allies	7/10
GameSpot	8/10
IGN	8/10
Nintendo Life	6/10
Push Square	8/10

The game received “mixed or average reviews" according to review aggregator website Metacritic. 69% of critics recommend the game on OpenCritic.

Jonathon Dornbush of IGN praises about its charming adventure from how they established a strong foundational system when it comes to exploring and fighting with your falcon, while presenting an intriguing sparse world that explores some meaningful concepts. GameSpot's Calum Marsh praised the game over its responsive mechanics making falconry exhilarating but dislikes dialogue sounds being sloppy and sometimes jarringly out of place.

A review on VICE praised the developers to make a game about resisting colonialism at its strongest when it avoids the frustrating gameplay loops and leans into building up the culture and history of its world.

== Awards ==
Year	Award	Category	Result	Ref
2019	XR Awards	VR Game of the Year	Nominated	
