= Sunless Skies =

2019 role-playing video game

- Developer: Failbetter Games
- Publisher: Failbetter Games
- Programmers: Barry Hemans; Liam McDonald
- Writers: Chris Gardiner; Cash de Cuir; James Chew; Olivia Wood
- Engine: Unity
- Platforms: Linux; macOS; Windows; Nintendo Switch; PlayStation 4; Xbox One
- Release: Linux, macOS, Windows; 31 January 2019; Switch, PS4, Xbox One; 19 May 2021
- Genre: Role-playing
- Mode: Single-player

Sunless Skies is a role-playing video game developed by Failbetter Games. Partially funded by a Kickstarter campaign, the game entered early access in 2017 and released in January 2019, and has been described as a "Gothic horror roleplay game". Sunless Skies is a direct sequel to 2015's Sunless Sea and incorporates similar elements and setting.

== Gameplay ==
Sunless Skies is an exploration and narrative focused role-playing video game. The game is played from a top-down perspective. Players navigate the game world via an upgradeable interstellar locomotive, and can interact with various narratives both brief and long that may have positive or negative rewards. While traveling, the locomotive may have to fight off other hostile locomotives or otherworldly creatures. If the player's locomotive is destroyed or their character is otherwise killed, they must begin anew, but some of the previous character's possessions may be passed to the next and certain narrative events remain completed. With each player character, the world map is also rearranged and re-obscured, forcing the player to rediscover locations.

== Synopsis ==
Sunless Skies is set in the same Victorian era-inspired world as Fallen London and Sunless Sea. The game is set ten years after the events of Sunless Sea, after the subterranean city of London opened a gateway known as the Avid Horizon and gained access to outer space, here called the High Wilderness, where stars are godlike beings who exert power through their light and unspeakable terrors lurk in the dark. The New British Empire has spread to multiple stars and even built an artificial star of its own, the Clockwork Sun, and Queen Victoria has assumed the throne of a dead star and attained mastery over the properties of time itself. The player assumes the role of a crewmember on a ramshackle locomotive who inherits captaincy of the vessel and a strange black box after the previous captain is mortally wounded. The player is free to pursue the mystery of the box, embark on a career as a trader and retire wealthy, fight in a war between the Empire and rebellious colonists, or seek out answers to a dangerous question: why are the stars dying?

== Development ==
The game was announced at the 2016 EGX expo. In February 2017, the studio launched a crowdfunding campaign on Kickstarter to raise funds for the game's development. Failbetter estimated the total cost of the game's development to be £330,000. They set a funding goal of only £100,000 - explaining the discrepancy by committing to using profits from their existing projects to close the gap. In the event, the project raised £377,000.

The game was developed on the Unity game engine and Failbetter's own narrative platform StoryNexus.

Failbetter CEO Paul Arendt noted that they didn't want a sequel to just be Sunless Sea 2 with bigger ships. Taking the Victorian setting into space appealed to them. The development team cited the science fiction and planetary romance works of authors C. S. Lewis, H. G. Wells, and Leigh Brackett as influences along with Art Nouveau and the 1999 game Planescape: Torment.

=== Release ===
The game was scheduled to be released in early access in May 2017 with a full release in May 2018, for Linux, macOS, Windows-based personal computers. It was initially delayed to September 2018, then lastly to January 2019.

=== Sovereign Edition ===
Failbetter announced on 19 October 2019 that the final update for Sunless Skies would be Sunless Skies: Sovereign Edition, a definitive version of the game containing all previous content in addition to several new narrative events and gameplay improvements. Owners of the PC version of the game will receive the Sovereign Edition update for free, and the full game with all post-launch updates included will be released simultaneously on PlayStation 4, Xbox One, and Nintendo Switch. The Sovereign Edition was originally planned to release in the first half of 2020, but it was later delayed to a window of August/September 2020 before being delayed again indefinitely due to persistent performance issues with the console ports. On 29 January 2021, Failbetter stated that the earliest possible release window for the Sovereign Edition would be March 2021, but stressed this was not a firm date. On 28 April 2021, Failbetter set a tentative release date for the Sovereign Edition for 19 May, cautioning that this could still be delayed if the certification processes for console versions encountered unexpected issues. Sunless Skies: Sovereign Edition was released on 19 May 2021.

== Reception ==
Reception

Aggregate score
Aggregator	Score
Metacritic	87/100

Review scores
Publication	Score
GameSpot	8/10
PC Gamer (US)	90/100
PCGamesN	9/10

Upon the game's release in January 2019, Sunless Skies was praised by critics, receiving a Metacritic score of 87, indicating 'generally favourable' reviews. PC Gamer called it "A game that gives you a clutch of weird and wonderful tales to tell, even when you fail miserably", while praising the game's replayability and writing. GameSpot, however, criticized the game for repetitive early storylines and uninteresting combat gameplay.

=== Accolades ===
While in development, the game was nominated for "Writing or Narrative Design" at the 2018 Develop Awards. After release, it was nominated for "Best Narrative", "Best Original IP", and "Game of the Year" at the Develop:Star Awards; for the "Creativity Award", "Best Game by a Small Studio", and "Best Role Playing Game" at The Independent Game Developers' Association Awards; for "Best Storytelling", "Best Indie Game", and "PC Game of the Year" at the Golden Joystick Awards; for the Off Broadway Award for Best Indie Game at the New York Game Awards, and for "Game, Franchise Role Playing" at the NAVGTR Awards.
