= Sunless Sea =

2015 video game

- Developer: Failbetter Games
- Publisher: Failbetter Games
- Director: Alexis Kennedy
- Programmers: Liam Welton; Liam McDonald
- Artist: Paul Arendt
- Writers: Alexis Kennedy; Chris Gardiner; Richard Cobbett; Emily Short; Meg Jayanth; Amal El-Mohtar
- Composers: Maribeth Solomon; Brent Barkman
- Engine: Unity
- Platforms: Linux, Windows, OS X, iOS, PlayStation 4, Nintendo Switch, Xbox One
- Release: Windows; 6 February 2015; PlayStation 4; 28 August 2018; Nintendo Switch; 23 April 2020; Xbox One; 24 April 2020
- Genre: Roguelike
- Mode: Single-player

Sunless Sea is a survival/exploration role-playing video game with roguelike elements developed by Failbetter Games. The game was released on 6 February 2015 for Windows and OS X following a successful Kickstarter campaign to crowdfund the project. The game takes place in the universe of Failbetter's browser adventure game Fallen London, in which Victorian-era London has been moved beneath the Earth's surface to the edge of the Unterzee, a vast underground ocean. On 11 October 2016, the game's first downloadable content Zubmariner was released, which allows players to explore beneath the surface of the "zee". A sequel, Sunless Skies, was announced in September 2016. It surpassed its funding goals on Kickstarter and was released on 31 January 2019.

== Gameplay ==
The player takes on the role of an Unterzee steamship captain, whose background and ambitions are customisable. The player can win by achieving their chosen ambition, such as becoming Fallen London's most celebrated explorer or amassing enough wealth to retire. Resources to achieve these ends are acquired by discovering new locations, trading goods across the Unterzee, battling ships and "zee monsters", and completing "storylet" quests. There are several roguelike gameplay elements, such as partially randomised maps and permanent character death, but subsequent characters can inherit some of their predecessor's possessions, and a player may create a will to ensure lodging and wealth for their successors.

The actual gameplay consists of two modes: the player controlling the movement of the ship on the map with combat taking place in the same mode, and a story mode where the player is presented with several choices (sometimes accompanied by a skill challenge) in a card-like format. The ship movement is quite slow. This, accompanied by the music, creates an atmosphere of tension.

The Unterzee has multiple islands, with each island having its own storylet quests. To progress in the quests, the player has to provide an item or complete a skill check. To acquire the items, the player usually must travel to different islands or defeat sea beasts. A skill check takes one of the player's five skills (Hearts, Iron, Pages, Mirrors, and Veils) and based on the value of the skill gives the player a chance to pass the test. Passing the tests often rewards the player with items, while failing them may harm the player and prevent them from trying again for a period of time.

Several bits of writing and settings in the game are literary allusions – for instance, the very premise of a subterranean "Sunless Sea" is a reference to the poem Kubla Khan by Samuel Taylor Coleridge, which is further reflected by the existence of a Khanate and an "Abora Gate".

== Development ==
On 3 September 2013, Failbetter Games launched a Kickstarter campaign to crowdfund Sunless Sea with a funding goal of £60,000. The project was successfully funded, receiving around £100,000 from over 4000 backers. On 13 May 2014, the studio launched a Greenlight campaign to release the game on Steam. The game was approved 15 days later. On 17 June, the game was soft launched on the developer's website, a Steam early access build was later released on 1 July. The game officially launched on 6 February 2015.

A PlayStation 4 version, that includes the Zubmariner expansion, was released in August 2018 and a Nintendo Switch version, also including the Zubmariner expansion, was released on 23 April 2020. The Xbox One version was released the next day, on the 24th of April 2020.

== Reception ==
Reception

Aggregate score
Aggregator	Score
Metacritic	PC: 81/100 iOS: 89/100; PS4: 74/100; NS: 73/100

Review scores
Publication	Score
Eurogamer	10/10
Game Informer	8/10
GameSpot	6/10
IGN	8.3/10
TouchArcade	4.5/5

Sunless Sea received mostly positive reviews from professional critics on launch, with the writing and setting being the most highly praised aspects of the game. Aggregate review website Metacritic assigned score of 81/100.

IGN awarded it 8.3 out of 10 saying "Sunless Sea gives you a wonderful world to explore that's packed with memorable written vignettes and danger."

The game won Rock, Paper, Shotgun's award for best game writing of 2014, and was nominated for a Writer's Guild of Great Britain Best Writing in Videogames Award in 2015.

GameSpot awarded it a score of 6 out of 10, saying "Sunless Sea is an ambitious work that attempts to capture the sheer kinetic thrill of discovery in a bottle without the inevitable entropy of player completion depleting it, and falls well short."

As of 25 February 2015, the game had sold 100,000 copies. According to director Alexis Kennedy, sales had risen to 350,000 units by June 2018.
