= Failbetter Games =

British video game developer

Failbetter Games Ltd
- Type: Private
- Industry: Video games
- Founded: October 2009; 17 years ago
- Founders: Alexis Kennedy; Paul Arendt
- Headquarters: London, United Kingdom
- Key people: Chris Gardiner; Emily Short; Adam Myers; Hannah Flynn
- Products: Fallen London; Sunless Sea; Sunless Skies
- Number of employees: 17
- Website: www.failbettergames.com

Failbetter Games Ltd is a British video game developer and interactive fiction studio based in London.

== History ==
Founded in 2009 by Alexis Kennedy and Paul Arendt, Failbetter is chiefly known for its Fallen London Victorian Gothic franchise (comprising, to date, the Fallen London and Silver Tree browser games and the Sunless Sea, Sunless Skies and Mask of the Rose video games), which has garnered a cult following. In June 2025, they announced a new game, Mandrake, in development for PC. Failbetter was also commissioned by BioWare to build a browser-game prologue for Dragon Age: Inquisition, and by UK publisher Harvill Secker to create a puzzle game to accompany The Night Circus. The studio has consistently won acclaim for the quality of its writing, world-building and storytelling.

In 2016, Alexis Kennedy left Failbetter, citing a desire to work with a variety of other studios and work on his own smaller, more experimental projects.

In February 2017, Failbetter ran a successful Kickstarter for a sequel to Sunless Sea, Sunless Skies, raising almost half a million dollars. However, December that same year Failbetter unexpectedly laid off four members of staff, citing the under-performance of the Sunless Sea iPad port, and poor sales of their Sunless Skies in early access.

Failbetter was subsequently the target of an extensive but inconclusive investigative report by Eurogamer, which cited Kennedy and other unnamed staff in claiming poor management and a 'toxic' culture had developed since Kennedy's departure.

GamesIndustry.biz awarded Failbetter Games for being one of the best places to work in the games industry in the UK in 2017, 2019, 2020, 2021 and in the education category in 2022.

On 8 June 2023 Failbetter released a romantic visual novel set in the Fallen London universe called Mask of the Rose, which is a prequel to the other games in the franchise.

== Games developed ==
Year	Title	Platform(s)
2009	Fallen London	Android, Browser, iOS
2012	Tales of Fallen London: The Silver Tree	Browser
2014	Dragon Age: The Last Court	Browser
2015	Sunless Sea	iOS, Linux, Microsoft Windows, Nintendo Switch, OS X, PlayStation 4
2016	Zubmariner	Linux, Microsoft Windows, OS X
2019	Sunless Skies	Linux, macOS, Microsoft Windows, Xbox One, PlayStation 4, Nintendo Switch
2023	Mask of the Rose	Linux, macOS, Microsoft Windows
TBA	Mandrake	Linux, macOS, Microsoft Windows
