= Fallen London =

2009 video game

- Developer: Failbetter Games
- Publisher: Failbetter Games
- Directors: Alexis Kennedy; Emily Short
- Artist: Paul Arendt
- Engine: Storynexus
- Platform: Browser
- Release: October 2009
- Genre: Adventure
- Mode: Single-player

Fallen London, originally Echo Bazaar, is a browser-based interactive narrative game developed by Failbetter Games and set in "Fallen London", an alternative Victorian London with gothic overtones. The franchise subsequently expanded to other games, including Sunless Sea, its sequel Sunless Skies, and the visual novel Mask of the Rose.

The game has been running continuously since October 2009. In June 2018, the website received a major graphical update, with a page redesign as well as better scaling across devices.

== Setting ==
London is stolen from the surface into the Neath—a vast cavern beneath the earth. The city's streets twisted into a labyrinth centred on the Echo Bazaar, which serves as the centre of commerce and covets stories of love. While London retains a monarch, a parliament, and a mayor, the true power lies with the Masters of the Bazaar—cloaked inhuman beings who oversee domains of trade and enact mysterious agendas. Even physical laws lose their supremacy beyond the sunlight; clocks and maps can no longer be trusted, rats and cats gain the power of speech, and death is often a temporary inconvenience, although at the cost of never seeing sunlight again.

While the industry, poverty, and high-class society of Victorian London remain, its strict social mores have been disrupted by strange new factions roaming its streets. Hell maintains an embassy in the city and trades in souls, to the consternation of the church. Artists and academics explore new possibilities unimaginable before the fall. Urchins, criminals, and revolutionaries hide from constables in the rooftops while hidden conflicts unfold below in shadows and reflections. Across the vast ocean of the Unterzee lies the Khanate empire, the impenetrable Elder Continent, and the screaming island of Polythreme, home of the Clay Men.

== Gameplay ==
Players escape from prison and begin living in London. Players explore the city and try various activities, plumbing the vices and secrets of Fallen London. They have no living expenses, and though players may choose a profession for a periodic income, they can publish a newspaper, serve out repeated prison sentences and feed deliverymen to a man-eating plant.

Every action a player takes comes from an action bank that replenishes at a rate of one action per 10 real-time minutes. Paid subscriptions increase the size of the action bank from twenty to forty, enabling longer play sessions.

Stats are used to track the player character's abilities and their position in the questlines; a character may accumulate hundreds. Four of these are the character's main attributes (Watchful, Shadowy, Dangerous, Persuasive) which are constantly used for succeeding in actions, though failure may also increase one of four menace qualities. If any menace rises too high, the character is removed to a side location (such as Disgraced exile in the Tomb-Colonies for Scandal) to work it off.

The game can be "won" in a sense by completing one of four "ambitions", but can also be lost. A quest for "Seeking Mr. Eaten's Name", about destructive obsession, requires the player to damage their character repeatedly until its completion leaves the character permanently unplayable. This quest is entirely opt-in, and the game warns against playing it.

== Development ==
Alexis Kennedy began solo development of Fallen London as an amateur project in June 2009, creating the setting, building the site and writing the initial content. He had originally intended the game to be an entirely text-based experience, but quickly realised that art would enhance the project, and recruited a friend, Paul Arendt.

"Paul came on board because I wanted to write and code but I can't draw," says Kennedy. The original plan was to pay Arendt outright for his illustration work. "I said, 'I want to pay you as I want this to be a professional thing.' He said, 'Cut me in for a percentage,' and I said, 'Sure, that's great! I don't need to give you any money now! But you realise we're probably not going to make any actual money out of it?'" He claps his hands together. "We've been on salary for three years now, so... so that worked out."

The site launched initially in October 2009 as an entirely free site, and introduced free-to-play elements in January 2010. Kennedy and Arendt recruited a number of other friends to write additional content, and over the years, the writing of Fallen London became a collective endeavour.

Fallen London is built on Failbetter's StoryNexus engine. Kennedy has explained that creating StoryNexus was the original motivation behind the creation of Fallen London. The company's plan was to develop StoryNexus as an open platform, but later described StoryNexus as a "failure".

Exceptional Stories are produced both by Failbetter and by external writers as paid content for subscribers.

== Release ==
Fallen London was released in 2009 as a browser game. An iOS and Android version was released in 2016, but was retired in 2018.

== Reception ==
Reception

Aggregate score
Aggregator	Score
Metacritic	iOS: 77/100

Review score
Publication	Score
TouchArcade	iOS: 4.5/5

Fallen London has received positive reviews, with much praise going to its writing and worldbuilding. Dan Zuccarelli of Gamezebo, calling the game "one of the best browser games [they'd] ever played", pointed to the game's "compelling but not overwhelming" story as its main feature. Rock, Paper, Shotgun's Adam Smith wrote in favour of its writing style along with its "inventive setting", "dripping with lore". He noted how most of the discovery comes from the player working things out for themselves.

In a review of the game as Echo Bazaar in Black Gate, Vito Excalibur called it "a fantastic diversion". Alana Joli Abbott for Black Gate also reviewed Fallen London and said "I do enjoy dabbling in the game, and I suspect that eventually, I will attain that enviable rank of Person of Some Importance. The world is extremely cool — and eerie — and I'm curious to know what happened to make London fall."

Emily Short found it "almost entirely about setting". She gave credit to the quality of the game's prose and its "reasonably consistent" worldbuilding, though thought the game could be used for "something plottier". Short noted the "grinding" in the game, but found the daily time investment to play the game small enough to overlook its gameplay's "slightness". However, Short subsequently went on to become a writer for the game, and in late 2019 joined Failbetter as creative director.

The game won The Escapist "Best Browser-Based Game" award for the year 2009.

== Spin-off media ==
Sunless Sea and its sequel, Sunless Skies, are roguelike spin-offs of Fallen London.

On 22 September 2018, Failbetter Games released Skyfarer RPG, a rules light, highly narrative indie pen-and-paper role-playing game to accompany Sunless Skies.

Tales of Fallen London: The Silver Tree, a prequel to Fallen London, was released on 23 October 2012. The Silver Tree is also a browser-based choose-your-own-adventure game, but occurs roughly five hundred years before the time of Fallen London and focuses on the events surrounding the fall of the Fourth City, Karakorum, capital of the Mongol Empire. A tabletop game titled Knife & Candle (named for the competitive sport within the setting that combines elements of tag and a free-for-all murder spree) was in development, but John Harper stated that the game "didn't come together".

In 2023, Failbetter released a romantic visual novel set in the Fallen London universe called Mask of the Rose, which serves as a prequel to the other games in the franchise.

In 2025, Failbetter licensed tabletop game developers Magpie Games to create an official roleplaying game for Fallen London, which raised $1 million on Kickstarter.
